= Family Jewels (video compilation) =

Video by AC/DC
- Released: 28 March 2005; 10 November 2009 (disc 3)
- Recorded: April 1975 – February 2009
- Genre: Hard rock
- Length: 150:00
- Label: Albert; Epic

Family Jewels is a compilation DVD by the hard rock band AC/DC, featuring the group's music videos, live clips and promotional videos from 1975 to 2008. It was released by Albert Productions and Epic Music Video on 28 March 2005. The first disc contains videos from the Bon Scott era (1975–1980), such as the band's first TV appearance and a performance on television ten days before Scott died. The second disc contains material from the Brian Johnson era up to 1991.

The third disc was released on 10 November 2009 as part of the Backtracks box set. It is included in both the Deluxe and Standard Edition. This DVD picks up from where the original 2DVD Family Jewels set leaves off (1991), Family Jewels Disc Three begins with "Big Gun" the theme song to the motion picture Last Action Hero. Also on this disc are three music videos from the Ballbreaker album, three from Stiff Upper Lip and two from Black Ice. There are also several songs from the original Family Jewels set that actually had more than one promotional clip. The third disc also contains these videos, which appear on DVD for the first time.

The compilation is certified 10× Platinum by the RIAA for sales in excess of 1,000,000 (RIAA Video Longform Platinum = 100,000). The UK magazine Classic Rock awarded Family Jewels the title of 'DVD of the year' in 2005.

== Track listing ==
=== Disc one ===
All songs by Bon Scott, Angus Young and Malcolm Young except where noted.

1. "Baby, Please Don't Go" (Williams)
  - Filmed live on ABC's Countdown in April 1975.
2. "Show Business" (live)
  - Filmed on 16 June 1975.
3. "High Voltage"
  - High Voltage promo clip filmed on 16 June 1975.
4. "It's a Long Way to the Top (If You Wanna Rock 'n' Roll)"
  - Countdown promo clip filmed on 23 February 1976.
5. "T.N.T."
  - Filmed live on ABC's Countdown in early 1976.
6. "Jailbreak"
  - Countdown promo clip filmed in March 1976.
7. "Dirty Deeds Done Dirt Cheap"
  - Filmed live on ABC's Countdown on 5 December 1976.
8. "Dog Eat Dog"
  - Filmed for ABC's Countdown on 3 April 1977.
9. "Let There Be Rock"
  - Let There Be Rock promo clip filmed in July 1977.
10. "Rock 'n' Roll Damnation"
  - Powerage studio version promo clip using footage filmed live at the Glasgow Apollo on 30 April 1978.
11. "Sin City" (live)
  - Filmed for ABC's The Midnight Special on 06 September 1978.
12. "Riff Raff" (live)
  - Filmed on 30 April 1978 at the Glasgow Apollo.
13. "Fling Thing/Rocker" (live)
  - Filmed on 30 April 1978 at the Glasgow Apollo. "Fling Thing" was rejected for the band's first live album (see If You Want Blood You've Got It)
14. "Whole Lotta Rosie" (live)
  - Filmed on 28 October 1978 on BBC's Rock Goes to College. (10 November, University of Essex, Colchester, Essex, according to the Rock Goes to College article)
15. "Shot Down in Flames"
16. "Walk All Over You"
17. "Touch Too Much"
18. "If You Want Blood (You've Got It)"
  - The above four tracks are Highway to Hell promo clips filmed in July 1979.
19. "Girls Got Rhythm"
20. "Highway to Hell"
  - The above two tracks were filmed live on TVE1's Aplauso on 9 February 1980, 10 days before Bon Scott's death.

=== Disc two ===
All songs by Brian Johnson, Angus Young and Malcolm Young except where noted.

1. "Hells Bells"
2. "Back in Black"
3. "What Do You Do for Money Honey"
4. "Rock and Roll Ain't Noise Pollution"
  - The above four tracks are Back in Black promo clips filmed in July 1980.
5. "Let's Get It Up" (live)
  - Filmed on 21 December 1981.
6. "For Those About to Rock (We Salute You)" (live)
  - Filmed on 17 & 18 November 1983.
7. "Flick of the Switch"
8. "Nervous Shakedown"
  - The above two tracks are Flick of the Switch promo clips filmed in October 1983.
9. "Fly on the Wall"
10. "Danger"
11. "Sink the Pink"
12. "Stand Up"
13. "Shake Your Foundations"
  - The above five tracks are from the Fly on the Wall home video filmed in June 1985.
14. "Who Made Who"
  - Who Made Who promo clip filmed on 27 & 28 February 1986.
15. "You Shook Me All Night Long"
  - Who Made Who promo clip filmed on 10 & 12 June 1986.
16. "Heatseeker"
  - Blow Up Your Video promo clip filmed on 3 & 4 December, 1987.
17. "That's the Way I Wanna Rock 'n' Roll"
  - Blow Up Your Video promo clip filmed on 7 March 1988.
18. "Thunderstruck" (Young, Young)
  - The Razors Edge promo clip filmed on 17 August 1990.
19. "Moneytalks" (Young, Young)
  - The Razors Edge promo clip filmed on 6 November 1990.
20. "Are You Ready" (Young, Young)
  - The Razors Edge promo clip filmed on 18 March 1991.

=== Disc three ===
(only released in Backtracks box set)

All songs by Angus Young and Malcolm Young except where noted.

1. "Big Gun"
  - Last Action Hero promo clip filmed on 6 May 1993.
2. "Hard as a Rock"
  - Ballbreaker promo clip filmed on 22 August 1995.
3. "Hail Caesar"
4. "Cover You in Oil"
  - The above two videos are Ballbreaker promo clips filmed in November 1995.
5. "Stiff Upper Lip"
  - Stiff Upper Lip promo clip filmed on 14 & 15 March 2000.
6. "Satellite Blues"
7. "Safe in New York City"
  - The above two videos are Stiff Upper Lip promo clips filmed in May 2000.
8. "Rock 'n' Roll Train"
  - Black Ice promo clip filmed on 15 August 2008.
9. "Anything Goes"
  - Black Ice promo clip filmed on 27 February 2009.
10. "Jailbreak" (Young, Young, Scott)
  - Albert Productions promo clip filmed in early 1976.
11. "It's a Long Way to the Top (If You Wanna Rock 'n' Roll)" (Young, Young, Scott)
  - Countdown promo clip (City Park version) filmed on 23 February 1976.
12. "Highway to Hell" (Young, Young, Scott)
  - Highway to Hell promo clip filmed in July 1979.
13. "You Shook Me All Night Long" (Young, Young, Johnson)
  - Back in Black promo clip filmed in July 1980.
14. "Guns for Hire" (Young, Young, Johnson)
  - Flick of the Switch promo clip filmed in October 1983.
15. "Dirty Deeds Done Dirt Cheap" (live) (Young, Young, Scott)
16. "Highway to Hell" (live) (Young, Young, Scott)
  - The above two tracks are Live promo clips filmed on 17 August 1991.

Bonus Features

1. "The Making of "Hard as a Rock"
2. "The Making of "Rock 'n' Roll Train"

== Charts ==
Chart (2005)	Peak position
Australian DVDs Chart	1
Austrian Music DVDs Chart	1
Belgian (Flanders) Music DVDs Chart	1
Belgian (Wallonia) Music DVDs Chart	3
Danish Music DVDs Chart	1
Dutch Music DVDs Chart	10
Finnish Music DVDs Chart	1
Greek DVDs Chart	2
Hungarian DVDs Chart	2
Irish Music DVDs Chart	1
Italian Music DVDs Chart	1
New Zealand Music DVDs Chart	1
Norwegian Music DVDs Chart	1
Spanish Music DVDs Chart	2
Swedish DVDs Chart	1
US Music Videos Chart	1

== Certifications ==
Region	Certification	Certified units/sales
Australia (ARIA)	10× Platinum	150,000^{^}
Austria (IFPI Austria)	Gold	5,000^{*}
Belgium (BRMA)	Gold	25,000^{*}
Canada (Music Canada)	5× Platinum	50,000^{^}
Denmark (IFPI Danmark)	Platinum	40,000^{^}
Finland (Musiikkituottajat)	Platinum	14,803
France (SNEP)	2× Platinum	40,000^{*}
Germany (BVMI) video	7× Gold	175,000^{^}
Germany (BVMI) album	Gold	100,000^{‡}
New Zealand (RMNZ)	2× Platinum	10,000^{^}
Spain (Promusicae)	Platinum	25,000^{^}
Sweden (GLF)	Gold	10,000^{^}
Switzerland (IFPI Switzerland)	2× Platinum	12,000^{^}
United States (RIAA)	10× Platinum	500,000^{^}
^{*} Sales figures based on certification alone.^{^} Shipments figures based on certification alone.^{‡} Sales+streaming figures based on certification alone.
