= Backtracks (AC/DC album) =

2009 box set by AC/DC

Box set by AC/DC
- Released: 10 November 2009
- Recorded: November 1974 – 17 June 2003
- Genres: Hard rock; blues rock; rock and roll
- Label: Columbia
- Producer: AC/DC

AC/DC chronology
Black Ice (2008)	Backtracks (2009)	Iron Man 2 (2010)

Professional ratings
Aggregate scores
Source	Rating
Metacritic	(71/100)
Review scores
Source	Rating
Allmusic	3.5/5 stars
The Austin Chronicle	4/5 stars
Billboard	(favorable)
BLARE Magazine	4/5 stars
The Guardian	2/5 stars
The Phoenix	3/4 stars
PopMatters	(Deluxe) (Standard)
Q	4/5 stars
The Rolling Stone Album Guide	3.5/5 stars
Uncut	2/5 stars

Backtracks is a box set by the Australian hard rock band AC/DC. It was announced on 29 September 2009 and was released on 10 November 2009 (the Deluxe Edition was shipped out early, before the scheduled release date, due to overwhelming fan reaction and anticipation). This is a collection of the band's studio and live rarities together in one boxset. There are two editions: a Deluxe Edition and a Standard Edition. All tracks have been remastered to match the sound of the 2003 album remasters and many songs appear on CD for the first time. It is the band's second box set of rarities, following the Bonfire release in 1997.

The Deluxe Edition (available only through acdc.com) includes three CDs, two DVDs, one LP, a 164-page hard-back coffee table book and collectible merchandise reproductions all housed in an operating 1 watt guitar amplifier. One CD includes rare studio tracks including A-sides (such as the "Who Made Who" 12" A-side and "Big Gun"), B-sides, and UK and Australian-only releases, while the other two CDs document live tracks which have appeared on singles, EPs and promo or soundtrack albums over the years. Part three of the Family Jewels DVD series is included and also the entire 2003 Circus Krone, Munich, Germany, gig on DVD.

The Standard Edition (released as a smaller "budget" version for those who could not afford the steep price of the Deluxe Edition) includes two CDs and one DVD. CD One contains highlights of Studio Rarities, while CD two contains highlights of Live Rarities. The DVD is Family Jewels Disc Three.

== Contents ==
Guitar amplifier

The 12"x12"x4" (30 cm*30 cm*10 cm) exterior box is designed to resemble a vintage AC/DC guitar amplifier and also has the original logo that was spray-painted onto the rear of Angus and Malcolm Young's speaker cabinets in 1975. The "head" of the amp has a handle that lifts the top off to reveal the contents housed within. The head is also a working guitar amplifier. It is a one watt amplifier and is considered to be a collector's item.

164-page booklet

The booklet features 164 pages of rare and unseen photos spanning 1974-2009 plus full-size re-prints of original press releases, tour itineraries, tour books, test pressing labels and advertisements. Rare photography includes never-before-seen shots of the band recording at the Albert Music studio on King Street in Sydney with producers Harry Vanda and George Young in 1977. There are also unpublished live shots from all over the world.

Original memorabilia reproductions

The memorabilia includes the very first piece of merchandise for AC/DC, a 2-inch button stating, "I Do it For AC/DC". It features an early shot of Angus Young on the front. Also part of this is a sticker, again an early part of AC/DC merchandise, with Angus' school hat on the front with AC/DC logo on the cap. There is a "Lock Up Your Daughters" Tour Flyer, King Street Studio Track Sheet for "Dirty Deeds Done Dirt Cheap" Multitracks, a Bon Scott Temporary Tattoo, "Moneytalks" 100 Dollar Bill, AC/DC Guitar Pick, set of three 20 cm by 25 cm art lithographs and a 60 cm by 90 cm, 1977 "Let There Be Rock" European Tour Poster.

== Track listing ==
=== CD one – Studio Rarities ===
Studio Rarities collects AC/DC's studio rarities, many of the songs on CD for the first time. These are all of the songs that the band recorded throughout their career that appeared on Australian-only LP releases, movie soundtracks, 7" and 12" single releases, and CD "tour editions", etc. 12 of the 18 tracks are completely unique songs that have all been remastered to match the sound quality of the rest of the Columbia Records AC/DC catalog reissues. The other 6 tracks are the original versions of songs previously only available on the original Australian albums. Although "Rocker" and "High Voltage" are credited as being the original Australian versions, they fade out at the end; the versions on the original Australian LPs did not fade out but ended abruptly. "Dirty Deeds Done Dirt Cheap" and "Ain't No Fun (Waitin' 'Round To Be A Millionaire)" were already previously released in their full original Australian lengths on the 1994 international Atco reissue of Dirty Deeds, however, the 2003 Columbia remasters used the shorter versions again. When AC/DC's catalog (except the Australian releases) became available on iTunes in November 2012, the original un-cut versions of "Rocker" and "High Voltage" finally saw worldwide release on the digital version of Backtracks, although the fades is still present on Youtube.

==== Disc one ====
All tracks are written by Angus Young, Malcolm Young and Bon Scott, except where noted.

No.	Title	Writer(s)	Original release	Length
1.	"High Voltage" (deluxe edition only)		T.N.T. (Australian-only release) (1975)	4:18
2.	"Stick Around"		High Voltage (Australian release) (1975)	4:40
3.	"Love Song"		High Voltage (Australian release) (1975)	5:15
4.	"It's a Long Way to the Top (If You Wanna Rock 'n' Roll)" (deluxe edition only)		T.N.T. (Australian-only release) (1975)	5:16
5.	"Rocker" (deluxe edition only)		T.N.T. (Australian-only release) (1975)	2:55
6.	"Fling Thing"	A. Young, M. Young	Jailbreak (7" single) (1976)	2:00
7.	"Dirty Deeds Done Dirt Cheap" (deluxe edition only)		Dirty Deeds Done Dirt Cheap (Australian release) (1976)	4:11
8.	"Ain't No Fun (Waitin' Round to Be a Millionaire)" (deluxe edition only)		Dirty Deeds Done Dirt Cheap (Australian release) (1976)	7:30
9.	"R.I.P. (Rock in Peace)"		Dirty Deeds Done Dirt Cheap (Australian release) (1976)	3:35
10.	"Carry Me Home"		Dog Eat Dog (7" single) (1977)	3:58
11.	"Crabsody in Blue"		Let There Be Rock (original UK and Australian release) (1977)	4:43
12.	"Cold Hearted Man"		Powerage (original UK and European LP pressings) (1978)	3:35
13.	"Who Made Who Special Collector's Mix" (deluxe edition only)	A. Young, M. Young, Brian Johnson	Who Made Who (12" single) (1986)	4:50
14.	"Snake Eye"	A. Young, M. Young, Johnson	Heatseeker (12", CD single) (1988)	3:16
15.	"Borrowed Time"	A. Young, M. Young, Johnson	That's the Way I Wanna Rock 'n' Roll and Moneytalks (12" and CD single) (1988)	3:45
16.	"Down on the Borderline"	A. Young, M. Young, Johnson	Moneytalks (Australian 7", 12" and CD single) (1990)	4:15
17.	"Big Gun"	A. Young, M. Young	Big Gun, Last Action Hero (7", 12" and CD single; official movie soundtrack) (1993)	4:20
18.	"Cyberspace"	A. Young, M. Young	Safe in New York City CD single , Stiff Upper Lip (Australian bonus CD) (2001)	2:58

=== CDs two and three – Live Rarities ===
CD 2 and 3 has a collection of the band's live rarities from singles, CD promos, compilations and other oddities. All the songs have been remastered from the original source.

==== Disc two ====
All tracks are written by Angus Young, Malcolm Young and Bon Scott, except where noted.

No.	Title	Writer(s)	Original release	Length
1.	"Dirty Deeds Done Dirt Cheap" (Live at the Festival of Sydney, Haymarket, Australia, 30 January 1977)		Long Live the Evolution (compilation LP) (1977)	5:02
2.	"Dog Eat Dog" (Live at the Apollo Theatre, Glasgow, Scotland, 30 April 1978)		Whole Lotta Rosie (7" single) (1978)	4:30
3.	"Live Wire" (Live at the Hammersmith Odeon, London, 2 November 1979)		Touch Too Much (7" single) (1980)	5:05
4.	"Shot Down in Flames" (Live at the Hammersmith Odeon, London, 2 November 1979)		Touch Too Much (12" single) (1980)	3:39
5.	"Back in Black" (Live at the Capital Centre, Landover, MD, 21 December 1981)	A. Young, M. Young, Brian Johnson	Let's Get It Up (12" single) (1982)	4:21
6.	"T.N.T." (Live at the Capital Centre, Landover, MD, 20 December 1981)		Let's Get It Up (12" single) (1982)	3:58
7.	"Let There Be Rock" (Live at the Capital Centre, Landover, MD, 21 December 1981 – This is not the 12" version as stated in the booklet, there's a 3-minute edit)		For Those About to Rock (7" single) (1982)	7:30
8.	"Guns for Hire" (Live at the Joe Louis Arena, Detroit, MI, 18 November 1983)	A. Young, M. Young, Johnson	Who Made Who (7" and 12" single) (1986)	5:21
9.	"Sin City" (Live at the Joe Louis Arena, Detroit, MI, 18 November 1983 – deluxe edition only)		Nervous Shakedown (12" single) (1984)	5:30
10.	"Rock and Roll Ain't Noise Pollution" (Live at the Joe Louis Arena, Detroit, MI, 18 November 1983)	A. Young, M. Young, Johnson	Nervous Shakedown (12" single) (1984)	4:15
11.	"This House Is on Fire" (Live at the Joe Louis Arena, Detroit, MI, 18 November 1983)	A. Young, M. Young, Johnson	Nervous Shakedown (12" single) (1984)	3:25
12.	"You Shook Me All Night Long" (Live at the Joe Louis Arena, Detroit, MI, 18 November 1983)	A. Young, M. Young, Johnson	You Shook Me All Night Long (12" single) (1986)	3:30
13.	"Jailbreak" (Live at the Reunion Arena, Dallas, TX, 12 October 1985)		Shake Your Foundations (12" single) (1986)	13:22
14.	"Shoot to Thrill" (Live at Castle Donington, Leicestershire, England, 17 August 1991 – deluxe edition only)	A. Young, M. Young, Johnson	Dirty Deeds Done Dirt Cheap (CD single) (1992), 5 Titres Inedits en Concert (French 5-track CD) (1992)	5:30
15.	"Hell Ain't a Bad Place to Be" (Live at Castle Donington, Leicestershire, England, 17 August 1991 – deluxe edition only)		Highway to Hell (live) CD maxi single, Live (Japanese version), 5 Titres Inedits en Concert (French 5-track CD) (1992)	4:37

==== Disc three ====
All tracks on the deluxe edition only, except where noted

All tracks are written by Angus Young, Malcolm Young and Bon Scott, except where noted.

No.	Title	Writer(s)	Original release	Length
1.	"High Voltage" (Live at Castle Donington, Leicestershire, England, 17 August 1991)		Highway to Hell (CD maxi single) (1992)	9:25
2.	"Hells Bells" (Live at Castle Donington, Leicestershire, England, 17 August 1991)	A. Young, M. Young, Johnson	Highway to Hell (CD maxi single) (1992)	5:57
3.	"Whole Lotta Rosie" (Live at Castle Donington, Leicestershire, England, 17 August 1991)		Hail Caesar (CD single) (1995)	4:45
4.	"Dirty Deeds Done Dirt Cheap" (Live at Castle Donington, Leicestershire, England, 17 August 1991)		Dirty Deeds Done Dirt Cheap (CD single) (1992)	5:00
5.	"Highway to Hell" (Live at the Tushino Airfield, Moscow, 28 September 1991 – standard edition also)		5 Titres Inedits en Concert (French 5-track CD) (1992)	4:00
6.	"Back in Black" (Live at the Tushino Airfield, Moscow, 28 September 1991)	A. Young, M. Young, Johnson	5 Titres Inedits en Concert (French 5-track CD) (1992), Big Gun (CD single) (1993)	4:10
7.	"For Those About to Rock" (Live at the Tushino Airfield, Moscow, 28 September 1991 – standard edition also)	A. Young, M. Young, Johnson	Big Gun (CD single) (1993)	6:50
8.	"Ballbreaker" (Live at the Plaza de Toros de Las Ventas, Madrid, 10 July 1996)	A. Young, M. Young	Stiff Upper Lip (CD single, Australian bonus CD) (2001)	4:40
9.	"Hard as a Rock" (Live at the Plaza de Toros de Las Ventas, Madrid, 10 July 1996)	A. Young, M. Young	3 Live Tracks (No Bull promo CD single) (1996), Stiff Upper Lip (CD single, Australian bonus CD) (2001)	4:50
10.	"Dog Eat Dog" (Live at the Plaza de Toros de Las Ventas, Madrid, 10 July 1996)		3 Live Tracks (No Bull promo CD single) (1996)	4:46
11.	"Hail Caesar" (Live at the Plaza de Toros de Las Ventas, Madrid, 10 July 1996)	A. Young, M. Young	3 Live Tracks (No Bull promo CD single) (1996)	5:25
12.	"Whole Lotta Rosie" (Live at the Plaza de Toros de Las Ventas, Madrid, 10 July 1996)		Satellite Blues CD single, Stiff Upper Lip (Australian bonus CD) (2001)	5:27
13.	"You Shook Me All Night Long" (Live at the Plaza de Toros de Las Ventas, Madrid, 10 July 1996)	A. Young, M. Young, Johnson	Private Parts (official movie soundtrack) (1997)	3:58
14.	"Safe in New York City" (Live at the America West Arena, Phoenix, AZ, 13 September 2000 – standard edition also)	A. Young, M. Young	Safe in New York City (American promo CD single) (2000)	3:55

=== Family Jewels Disc Three (DVD) ===
This DVD picks up where the original 2DVD Family Jewels set leaves off (1991), Family Jewels Disc Three begins with "Big Gun" the theme song to the motion picture Last Action Hero which is included on Studio Rarities and is the first time on any AC/DC album. Also on this disc it has three music videos from the Ballbreaker album, three from Stiff Upper Lip and the most recent clips for "Rock 'n' Roll Train" and "Anything Goes" from the AC/DC album Black Ice. There are also several songs from the original Family Jewels set that actually had more than one promotional clip. On this are the alternate versions of those songs and are on DVD for the first time.

==== Disc three ====
1. "Big Gun"
2. "Hard as a Rock"
3. "Hail Caesar"
4. "Cover You in Oil"
5. "Stiff Upper Lip"
6. "Satellite Blues"
7. "Safe in New York City"
8. "Rock 'n' Roll Train"
9. "Anything Goes"

Bonus videos

1. "Jailbreak"
2. "It's a Long Way to the Top (If You Wanna Rock 'n' Roll)"
3. "Highway to Hell"
4. "You Shook Me All Night Long"
5. "Guns for Hire"
6. "Dirty Deeds Done Dirt Cheap (live)
7. "Highway to Hell" (live)

==== Bonus features ====
1. "The Making of "Hard as a Rock"
2. "The Making of "Rock 'n' Roll Train"

=== "Live at the Circus Krone" 17 June 2003 ===
2003 marked AC/DC's induction into the Rock and Roll Hall of Fame to European dates with The Rolling Stones, with the band making several high-profile public appearances (including the SARS concert in Toronto for 500,000 people). One run of shows found the band returning to their roots and playing clubs and theaters where fans were treated to sweaty, stripped-down shows and even playing some rarities they hadn't played in years. This DVD show from Munich is available only on the Deluxe Edition.

==== Live at the Circus Krone DVD ====
1. Introduction
2. "Hell Ain't a Bad Place to Be"
3. "Back in Black"
4. "Stiff Upper Lip"
5. "Shoot to Thrill"
6. "Thunderstruck"
7. "Rock 'n' Roll Damnation"
8. "What's Next to the Moon"
9. "Hard as a Rock"
10. "Bad Boy Boogie"
11. "The Jack"
12. "If You Want Blood (You've Got It)"
13. "Hells Bells"
14. "Dirty Deeds Done Dirt Cheap"
15. "Rock and Roll Ain't Noise Pollution"
16. "T.N.T."
17. "Let There Be Rock"
18. "Highway to Hell"
19. "For Those About to Rock (We Salute You)"
20. "Whole Lotta Rosie"

=== Rarities 180 Gram LP ===
The 12 unique studio rarities from CD 1 presented on 180 gram audiophile vinyl, mastered specifically for LP.

==== Side A ====
1. "Stick Around"
2. "Love Song"
3. "Fling Thing"
4. "R.I.P (Rock in Peace)"
5. "Carry Me Home"
6. "Crabsody in Blue"

==== Side B ====
1. "Cold Hearted Man"
2. "Snake Eye"
3. "Borrowed Time"
4. "Down on the Borderline"
5. "Big Gun"
6. "Cyberspace"

== Charts ==
=== Weekly charts ===
Chart (2009)	Peak position
Australian Albums (ARIA)	16
Austrian Albums (Ö3 Austria)	31
Belgian Albums (Ultratop Flanders)	55
Belgian Albums (Ultratop Wallonia)	34
Canadian Albums (Nielsen Soundscan)	50
German Albums (Offizielle Top 100)	10
Italian Albums (FIMI)	83
Spanish Albums (Promusicae)	18
Swedish Albums (Sverigetopplistan)	16
Swiss Albums (Schweizer Hitparade)	24
UK Albums (OCC)	134
US Billboard 200	39
US Top Hard Rock Albums (Billboard)	6
US Top Rock Albums (Billboard)	14

=== Year-end charts ===
Chart (2009)	Position
Australian Albums (ARIA)	90
