= Plug Me In =

2007 DVD box set by AC/DC

Video by AC/DC
- Released: 16 October 2007
- Recorded: 1975–2003
- Genre: Hard rock
- Length: 380:45
- Labels: Albert; Columbia; Columbia Music Video; Serpent

Plug Me In is a DVD box set released on 16 October 2007 by Australian hard rock group AC/DC. It includes rare performances of the band. The standard two-disc set contains one disc of performances from the Bon Scott era and one from the Brian Johnson era. The three-disc set includes Between the Cracks, featuring performances from both eras. The performance of "Shoot to Thrill" from the Summit, Houston, TX, October 1983 is on both disc two and three.

In November 2008, Plug Me In won Classic Rock Roll of Honour Awards for DVD of the Year.

Professional ratings
Review scores
Source	Rating
Allmusic	4.5/5 stars

== Track listing ==
=== Disc One: Bon Scott era ===
Live King of Pop Awards Australia; 10 October 1975)

1. "High Voltage"

Live (Bandstand" Channel 9, Australia; 21 February 1976)

1. "It's a Long Way to the Top (If You Wanna Rock 'n' Roll)"

Live St. Albans High March '76

1. "School Days" (St. Albans High School, Australia; 3 March 1976)
2. "T.N.T." (St. Albans High School, Australia; 3 March 1976)

Live at London July '76

1. "Live Wire" ("Super Pop / "Rollin' Bolan", London, England; 13 July 1976)
2. "Can I Sit Next to You Girl" ("Super Pop" / "Rollin' Bolan", London, England; 13 July 1976)

Live Sydney December '76

1. "Baby, Please Don't Go" (Myer Music Bowl, Melbourne; 5 December 1976)

Live at the Hippodrome October'77

1. "Hell Ain't a Bad Place to Be" ("Sight & Sound, in Concert" (BBC2), Golders Green Hippodrome, London, England; 29 October 1977)
2. "Rocker" ("Sight & Sound, in Concert" (BBC2), Golders Green Hippodrome, London, England; 29 October 1977)

Live at the Apollo Theatre April'78

1. "Rock 'n' Roll Damnation" (Apollo Theatre, Glasgow; 30 April 1978)
2. "Dog Eat Dog" (Apollo Theatre, Glasgow; 30 April 1978)
3. "Let There Be Rock" (Apollo Theatre, Glasgow; 30 April 1978)

Live at Colchester October'78

1. "Problem Child" ("Rock Goes To College" (BBC2), Colchester, England; 28 October 1978)
2. "Sin City" ("Rock Goes To College" (BBC2), Colchester, England; 28 October 1978)
3. "Bad Boy Boogie" ("Rock Goes To College" (BBC2), Colchester, England; 28 October 1978)

Live at Countdown July '79

1. "Highway to Hell" ("Countdown" (ABC), Arnhem, the Netherlands; 13 July 1979)
2. "The Jack" ("Countdown" (ABC), Arnhem, the Netherlands; 13 July 1979)
3. "Whole Lotta Rosie" ("Countdown" (ABC), Arnhem, the Netherlands; 13 July 1979)

==== Bonus Features ====
1. Band Interview at Sydney Airport - "Countdown" (ABC); 1 April 1976
2. Band Interview - Covent Garden, London, England; 16 July 1976
3. "Baby, Please Don't Go" - Circus Krone, Munich, Germany; 29 September 1976
4. "Problem Child" - Sidney Myer Music Bowl, Melbourne; 5 December 1976
5. Radio 3XY Promo: "Dirty Deeds Done Dirt Cheap" - Melbourne, Australia; December 1976
6. Bon Scott Interview - Countdown (ABC), London, England; 1 November 1977
7. "Rock 'n' Roll Damnation" - Top of the Pops (BBC1), London, England; 8 June 1978
8. Band Interview & Concert Highlights - "Australian Music to the World", Atlanta, Georgia, USA; 11 August 1978
9. Super 8 Bootleg Film of Concert Clips - Théatre de Verdure, Nice, France; 14 December 1979

=== Disc Two: Brian Johnson era ===
1. "Shot Down in Flames" (Nippon Budokan, Tokyo; 5 February 1981)
2. "What Do You Do for Money Honey" (Nippon Budokan, Tokyo; 5 February 1981)
3. "You Shook Me All Night Long" (Nippon Budokan, Tokyo; 5 February 1981)
4. "Let There Be Rock" (Nippon Budokan, Tokyo; 5 February 1981)
5. "Back in Black" (Capital Centre, Landover, Maryland; 20 December 1981)
6. "T.N.T." (Capital Centre, Landover, Maryland; 20 December 1981)
7. "Shoot to Thrill" (The Summit, Houston, TX; 30 October 1983)
8. "Guns for Hire" (Joe Louis Arena, Detroit, Michigan; 17 November 1983)
9. "Dirty Deeds Done Dirt Cheap" (Joe Louis Arena, Detroit, Michigan; 17 November 1983)
10. "Flick of the Switch" (Capital Centre, Landover, Maryland; 12 December 1983)
11. "Bedlam in Belgium" (Capital Centre, Landover, Maryland; 12 December 1983)
12. Montage: Coup Victims Memorial Service "Hells Bells" / "Back in Black" (Tushino Airfield, Moscow; 28 September 1991)
13. "Highway to Hell" (Tushino Airfield, Moscow; 28 September 1991)
14. "Whole Lotta Rosie" (Tushino Airfield, Моscow; 28 September 1991)
15. "For Those About to Rock (We Salute You)" (Tushino Airfield, Moscow; 28 September 1991)
16. "Gone Shootin'" (VH1 Studio B, London, England; 5 July 1996)
17. "Hail Caesar" (Entertainment Center, Sydney; 14 November 1996)
18. "Ballbreaker" (Entertainment Center, Sydney; 14 November 1996)
19. "Rock and Roll Ain't Noise Pollution" (Entertainment Center, Sydney; 14 November 1996)
20. "Hard as a Rock" (Stade de France, Paris; 22 June 2001)
21. "Hells Bells" (Stade de France, Paris; 22 June 2001)
22. "Ride On" (Stade de France, Paris; 22 June 2001)
23. "Stiff Upper Lip" (Circus Krone, München; 17 June 2003)
24. "Thunderstruck" (Circus Krone, München; 17 June 2003)
25. "If You Want Blood (You've Got It)" ("Toronto Rocks" Downsview Park, Toronto; 30 July 2003)
26. "The Jack" ("Toronto Rocks" Downsview Park, Toronto; 30 July 2003)
27. "You Shook Me All Night Long" ("Toronto Rocks" Downsview Park, Toronto; 30 July 2003)

==== Bonus features ====
1. "Ballbreaker Tour" intro film - "Beavis and Butt-Head"; 1996
2. Brian and Angus Interview & "Hells Bells" Live - Countdown (ABC), Forest National Brussels; 25 January 1981
3. Angus Young and David Lee Roth Interview - Whistle Test (BBC 2), Castle Donington Park; 18 August 1984
4. Rehearsal for "Gone Shootin'" - VH1 Studio B, London, England; 5 July 1996
5. Angus and Malcolm Young with The Rolling Stones "Rock Me Baby" - Licks Tour, Festwiese, Leipzig, Germany; 20 June 2003

=== Disc Three: Between the Cracks ===
1. "She's Got Balls" (St. Albans High School, Australia, March 1976)
2. "It's a Long Way to the Top" (St. Albans High School, Australia, March 1976)
3. "Let There Be Rock" (Sight & Sound In Concert, London, October 1977)
4. "Bad Boy Boogie" (Apollo Theatre, Glasgow, April 1978)
5. "Girls Got Rhythm" (Top Pop, 1979)
6. "Guns for Hire" (Band rehearsals 1983)
7. "This House Is on Fire" (Joe Louis Arena, Detroit, MI, November 1983)
8. "Highway to Hell" (Point Theatre, Dublin, June 1996)
9. "Girls Got Rhythm" (Entertainment Center, Sydney, November 1996)
10. "Let There Be Rock" (Stuttgart 2000)
11. Angus Statue Intro (Stiff Upper Lip Tour Film 2001)

==== Live at the Summit in Houston, 1983 ====
1. "Guns for Hire"
2. "Shoot to Thrill"
3. "Sin City"
4. "This House Is on Fire"
5. "Back in Black"
6. "Bad Boy Boogie"
7. "Rock and Roll Ain't Noise Pollution"
8. "Flick of the Switch"
9. "Hells Bells"

== Memorabilia (Collector's Edition only) ==
- AC/DC Live at Circus Krone Entry Reproduction
- AC/DC 1981 For Those About to Rock Tour Guest Pass Reproduction
- AC/DC Live at St. Albans High School Entry Reproduction
- AC/DC 1981 Back in Black Tour Entry Reproduction
- AC/DC 1983 Flick of the Switch Tour Working Personnel Pass Reproduction
- AC/DC 1978 Powerage Tour at "The Apollo" Entry Reproduction
- AC/DC Back in Black Tour "Back in London" Access All Areas Pass Reproduction
- AC/DC Highway to Hell Tour Poster Reproduction

== Bonus CD ==
Most music stores had a Plug Me In bonus CD with "Dog Eat Dog" from Glasgow in 1978 and "Back in Black" from Moscow in 1991. Best Buy in the US had a limited edition Plug Me In bonus CD with three live songs and Wal-Mart in the US had an exclusive Plug Me In bonus CD with five live songs.

=== Track listing ===
==== Standard Bonus CD ====
1. "Dog Eat Dog" (Live, Apollo, Glasgow, 30 April 1978)
2. "Back in Black" (Live, Tushino Airfield, Moscow, 28 September 1991)

==== Best Buy Bonus CD ====
1. "Rock 'n' Roll Damnation" (Live, Apollo, Glasgow, 30 April 1978)
2. "Dirty Deeds Done Dirt Cheap" (Live, Joe Louis Arena, Detroit, 18 November 1983)
3. "Thunderstruck" (Live, Circus Krone, Munich, 17 June 2003)

==== Wal-Mart Bonus CD ====
1. "Problem Child" (Live, Melbourne, 5 December 1976)
2. "Let There Be Rock" (Live, Apollo, Glasgow, 30 April 1978)
3. "Guns for Hire" (Live, Joe Louis Arena, Detroit, 18 November 1983)
4. "For Those About to Rock (We Salute You)" [Live, Tushino Airfield, Moscow, 28 September 1991)
5. "Stiff Upper Lip" (Live, Circus Krone, Munich, 17 June 2003)

== Charts ==
Chart (2007–2008)	Peak position
Australian DVDs Chart	1
Austrian Music DVDs Chart	3
Belgian (Flanders) Music DVDs Chart	1
Belgian (Wallonia) Music DVDs Chart	2
Danish Music DVDs Chart	1
Dutch Music DVDs Chart	6
German Albums Chart	3
Irish Music DVDs Chart	1
Italian Music DVDs Chart	2
New Zealand Music DVDs Chart	1
Norwegian Music DVDs Chart	2
Spanish Music DVDs Chart	1
Swedish DVDs Chart	1
Swiss Music DVDs Chart	2
US Music Videos Chart	1

== Certifications ==
Region	Certification	Certified units/sales
Australia (ARIA)	7× Platinum	105,000^{^}
Austria (IFPI Austria)	Gold	5,000^{*}
Canada (Music Canada)	3× Platinum	30,000^{^}
France (SNEP)	3× Platinum	60,000^{*}
Germany (BVMI) video	2× Platinum	100,000^{^}
Germany (BVMI) album	Gold	100,000^{‡}
New Zealand (RMNZ)	2× Platinum	10,000^{^}
Spain (Promusicae)	Platinum	25,000^{^}
Switzerland (IFPI Switzerland)	Platinum	6,000^{^}
United States (RIAA)	5× Platinum	166,665^{^}
^{*} Sales figures based on certification alone.^{^} Shipments figures based on certification alone.^{‡} Sales+streaming figures based on certification alone.

== Notes ==
- Plug Me In 5.1 was mixed by Mike Fraser.
- Plug Me In reached #1 on the ARIA DVD Chart, and has achieved 5× platinum status in Australia.
