= If You Want Blood You've Got It =

1978 live album by AC/DC

Live album by AC/DC
- Released: 13 October 1978
- Recorded: 30 April 1978
- Venues: The Apollo, Glasgow
- Genres: Hard rock; blues rock
- Length: 52:42
- Labels: Albert; Atlantic
- Producers: Harry Vanda; George Young

AC/DC chronology
Powerage (1978)	If You Want Blood You've Got It (1978)	Highway to Hell (1979)

Singles from If You Want Blood
- 1. "Whole Lotta Rosie (Live)" Released: 10 November 1978

If You Want Blood You've Got It (written as just If You Want Blood) is the first live album by Australian hard rock band AC/DC, and their only live album released during Bon Scott's lifetime. It was originally released in the UK and Europe on 13 October 1978, in the US on 21 November 1978, and in Australia on 27 November 1978. The album was re-released in 1994 on Atco Records and in 2003 as part of the AC/DC Remasters series.

== Background ==
The album was released six months after the band's previous studio album Powerage. A 'best-of' package called 12 of the Best had been in the works, but the project was scrapped in favour of a live album. It was recorded during the 1978 Powerage tour and contains songs from T.N.T., Dirty Deeds Done Dirt Cheap, Let There Be Rock, and Powerage. It is the last Bon Scott-era AC/DC album produced by Harry Vanda and George Young, who also produced the band's first five studio releases.

In his 1994 Bon Scott memoir Highway to Hell, author Clinton Walker observes, "Live albums, which tended to be double or triple sets in which songs short in their studio versions were stretched out into extended tedium, were for some reason popular in the seventies. If You Want Blood reversed this tradition... it boasted a blunt ten tracks and, allowing nothing extraneous, got straight to the point, that being raging AC/DC rock and roll."

A concert at the Apollo Theatre in Glasgow, Scotland on 30 April 1978 was used for the live tracks. The concert is also remembered for the encore, when AC/DC came back on stage dressed in the Scottish football strip, paying homage to Scott's and the Young brothers' homeland.

"This gig summed up what made AC/DC so special live: the energy, the rapport with the crowd and the way those simple yet classic songs took on another life. You hear all of this on If You Want Blood. It's a great reminder of how remarkable the band and their fans were that night." – Tom Russell, DJ

"Dog Eat Dog", performed on the night, was removed from the album release, while the encore – "Fling Thing/Rocker" – was edited, removing "Fling Thing" and cutting out Angus's extended solo, as he did a walk around the audience (with an early version of a wireless guitar lead). This part of the band's concert theatrics later accompanied "Let There Be Rock"; "Rocker" has been performed only a few times since Bon Scott's passing in 1980. The live "Dog Eat Dog" was released as the b-side of the single "Whole Lotta Rosie" in November 1978, but only in Australia. It was rereleased worldwide in 2009 on the two (standard) and three (collectors) CD boxed set compilation Backtracks, featuring Australian-only songs not released internationally at the time, and live b-Sides from 7" and 12" singles. The encores "Fling Thing" and "Rocker" (with a complete guitar solo) appeared only on footage of the concert by a Dutch TV station played at the time, but were eventually released on the Family Jewels DVD.

According to the 2006 book AC/DC: Maximum Rock & Roll, the album title was an extension of Scott's response – at the Day on the Green festival in July 1978 – when a journalist asked what they could expect from the band. The singer replied, "Blood." The cover art is from a shoot with Atlantic Records' staff photographer Jim Houghton after the show at Boston's Paradise Theater on 21st August 1978, the idea for which came from Atlantic's art director Bob Defrin. The front cover depicts Angus Young being impaled on stage with a guitar during a performance, while the back depicts a bloodied Young lying facedown on the same stage, though deserted.

A song titled "If You Want Blood (You've Got It)" appeared on the next album: the band's US chart breakthrough, Highway to Hell.

== Reception ==
Professional ratings
Review scores
Source	Rating
AllMusic	3.5/5 stars
Blender	5/5 stars
Collector's Guide to Heavy Metal	9/10
The Encyclopedia of Popular Music	3/5 stars
MusicHound Rock	4.5/5 stars
The Rolling Stone Album Guide	3/5 stars
Spin Alternative Record Guide	5/10

In a 1992 interview with Metal Hammer at the time of the band's second live release, Malcolm Young admitted, "I personally still prefer the old album. We were young, fresh, vital and kicking ass." Greg Prato of AllMusic notes, "While most other rock bands of the era were busy experimenting with disco or creating studio-perfected epics, AC/DC was one of the few specializing in raw and bluesy hard rock, as evidenced by 1978's live set, If You Want Blood You've Got It." Eduardo Rivadavia of Ultimate Classic Rock enthuses, "Other concert records may boast more songs, more Top 40 hits or even more crowd-pleasing gimmicks. But very few can challenge the sheer excitement and reckless abandon captured on AC/DC’s terrific concert document." Carlo Twist of Blender magazine praised the album, saying that "They were always a mighty live act, and this is the sound of AC/DC in Europe just prior to 1979's U.S. breakthrough. The audience's hysteria regularly cuts through the amps, as they howl along to singer Bon Scott's tale of sexually transmitted disease ("The Jack") and punctuate guitarist Angus Young's staccato riffing on "Whole Lotta Rosie." Imagine a punk-rock Chuck Berry played at nosebleed volume." Canadian journalist Martin Popoff called If You Want Blood You've Got It "an obligatory live album hastily rushed out to capitalize on the band's growing stature", but praised "its refreshing brevity and an amphetamine-supercharged retooling of 'Rocker'".

The album was listed at No. 2 on Classic Rock magazine's readers' poll of "50 Greatest Live Albums Ever".

== Concert footage ==
The entire Glasgow concert was filmed but the complete footage has never been released. Eventually, "Riff Raff" and "Fling Thing/Rocker" segments were made available on the DVD AC/DC Family Jewels, released in 2005. Video footage was also used from the show on Family Jewels using the "Rock 'n' Roll Damnation" studio version audio track promotional clip. Segments from the concert (the songs "Rock 'n' Roll Damnation", "Dog Eat Dog" and "Let There Be Rock") were made available on the DVD Plug Me In, released in 2007 (the latter 2 were also released on YouTube in 2013). "Bad Boy Boogie" was included on the bonus disc on the three-disc edition of Plug Me In.

== Track listing ==
All tracks are written by Angus Young, Malcolm Young and Bon Scott.

Side one
No.	Title	Origin album	Length
1.	"Riff Raff"	Powerage	5:59
2.	"Hell Ain't a Bad Place to Be"	Let There Be Rock	4:10
3.	"Bad Boy Boogie"	Let There Be Rock	7:29
4.	"The Jack"	T.N.T.	5:48
5.	"Problem Child"	Dirty Deeds Done Dirt Cheap	4:40

Side two
No.	Title	Origin album	Length
6.	"Whole Lotta Rosie"	Let There Be Rock	4:05
7.	"Rock 'n' Roll Damnation"	Powerage	3:41
8.	"High Voltage"	T.N.T.	5:05
9.	"Let There Be Rock"	Let There Be Rock	8:33
10.	"Rocker"	T.N.T.	3:24
Total length:			52:44

=== Original concert setlist ===
All songs written by Angus Young, Malcolm Young, and Bon Scott except "Fling Thing", which is a Scottish traditional song.

No.	Title	Length
1.	"Riff Raff"
2.	"Problem Child"
3.	"Hell Ain't a Bad Place to Be"
4.	"Rock n Roll Damnation"
5.	"Bad Boy Boogie"
6.	"Dog Eat Dog"
7.	"The Jack"
8.	"High Voltage"
9.	"Whole Lotta Rosie"
10.	"Let There Be Rock"
11.	"Fling Thing"
12.	"Rocker"

Notes

- The song "Gimme a Bullet" was played during sound-check, according to the Official Apollo Theatre website setlist for the show.
- "Fling Thing" is the b-side to the original Australian only single of "Jailbreak", but is actually the traditional Scottish folk song "The Bonnie Banks o' Loch Lomond". The band played it live in Australia and Scotland as a staple part of the encores in the early years, and is replayed on the 1991 album AC/DC Live 2 CD Collectors edition from the Glasgow concert on the Razors Edge World Tour (though this time it is just called "Bonny") and it was re-released in its original form, for the first time since 1976, on the Backtracks boxed set.
- This version of "Fling Thing / Rocker (reprise)" - as it was the encore for the concert - is on the Family Jewels DVD, with some of the other songs from this concert, but the entire show has never been seen in its entirety since an original broadcast by a Dutch TV station around the same era.

== Personnel ==
- Bon Scott – lead vocals
- Angus Young – lead guitar
- Malcolm Young – rhythm guitar, backing vocals
- Cliff Williams – bass guitar, backing vocals
- Phil Rudd – drums

Production

- Producers: Harry Vanda, George Young
- Sound: Mike Scarfe (MHA AUDIO)

== Charts ==
Chart performance for If You Want Blood You've Got It
Chart (1978–2024)	Peak position
Australian Albums (Kent Music Report)	37
Dutch Albums (Album Top 100)	7
German Albums (Offizielle Top 100)	73
Swiss Albums (Schweizer Hitparade)	29
UK Albums (Official Charts)	13
UK Rock & Metal Albums (Official Charts)	17
US Billboard 200	113

== Certifications ==
Region	Certification	Certified units/sales
Australia (ARIA)	3× Platinum	210,000^{^}
France (SNEP)	Gold	100,000^{*}
Germany (BVMI)	Platinum	500,000^{^}
Spain (Promusicae)	Gold	50,000^{^}
Switzerland (IFPI Switzerland)	Gold	25,000^{^}
United Kingdom (BPI)	Gold	100,000^{^}
United States (RIAA)	Platinum	1,000,000^{^}
^{*} Sales figures based on certification alone.^{^} Shipments figures based on certification alone.
