= List of AC/DC tribute albums =

This is a list of tribute albums (and individual covers) of the Australian hard rock band AC/DC. Due to AC/DC's worldwide popularity, many musicians have made tribute albums to the band. These albums have been made by a variety of different artists from across several different genres, such as bluegrass music and death metal. AC/DC's influence has also meant that their individual songs have also been frequently covered by other artists.

== Tribute albums ==
Title	Artist(s)	Released	Notes
Welcome to Rock'n'Roll Hell: A Tribute to AC/DC & Motörhead	Various	1989	Covers of AC/DC & Motörhead songs. Artists featured include; Jingo de Lunch, Slawheads, What... For, The Angels and Bellybutton & The Knockwells.
Fuse Box - The Alternative Tribute	Various	1995	Artists featured include; Frenzal Rhomb, Don Walker, Nitocris, The Meanies, Ed Kuepper and Spiderbait.
Thunderbolt: A Tribute to AC/DC	Various	1996	Artists featured include; Zakk Wylde, Sebastian Bach, Joe Lynn Turner, Jack Russell, John Corabi and Lemmy Kilmister.
Covered in Black: An Industrial Tribute to the Kings of High Voltage	Various	1997	Covers of AC/DC songs in an industrial style. Artists featured include; Electric Hellfire Club, Genitorturers, Die Krupps, Spahn Ranch, and Godflesh.
Hell Ain't a Bad Place to Be: A Tribute to AC/DC	Various	1999	Artists featured include; REO Speedealer, Zeke, Supersuckers, Fuckemos and Electric Frankenstein.
A Hillbilly Tribute to AC/DC	Hayseed Dixie	2000	Features bluegrass covers of various AC/DC songs.
4,5 Volt: AC/DC Tribute Album	Various	2000	Artists featured include; Anima Soundsystem, Budapest Underground, Zeus and Dyas, and FreshFabrik.
What's Next to the Moon	Mark Kozelek	2001	Covers of AC/DC songs from the Bon Scott-era done in a folk ballad style.
Back in Baroque... The String Tribute to AC/DC		2003	A classical version of Back in Black.
The Rock-A-Billy Tribute to AC/DC	Full Blown Cherry	2004	Covers of AC/DC songs in a rockabilly style.
Graveyard Classics 2	Six Feet Under	2004	Cover of the Back in Black album done in a death metal style.
Thunder Tracks Tribute to AC/DC	Various Japanese artists	2008	
AC/DC tribute band Bedlam In Belgium	AC/DC	2012	Full AC/DC tribute show

== Individual covers ==
Many different musicians have covered AC/DC's songs, proving the band's influence on many different artists from across numerous music genres, as the list shows:

Artist(s)	Song(s) covered	Album/single	Released	Notes
The Party Boys	"Let There Be Rock", "High Voltage"	No Song Too Sacred, The Party Boys	1984, 1987	
Beastie Boys	"Sampled Back In Black on track Rock Hard"	Single	1985	
Guns N' Roses	"Whole Lotta Rosie"	"Welcome to the Jungle" single, Live from the Jungle	1987, 1988	Has also been played as part of Guns N' Roses' concerts.
John Farnham	"It's a Long Way to the Top (If You Wanna Rock 'n' Roll)"	Age of Reason	1988	
Exodus	"Overdose", "Dirty Deeds Done Dirt Cheap"	Fabulous Disaster, Tempo of the Damned respectively.	1988, 2004 respectively	
Bruce Dickinson	"Sin City"	Tattooed Millionaire	1990	
Hard Ons with Henry Rollins	"Let There Be Rock"	Single	1991	
Sam Kinison (Featuring Slash)	"Highway To Hell"	Leader of the Banned	1990	
Brothers	"Back In Black"	Back In Black (1993) Two For The Price Of One (1994)	1993	
Acid Drinkers	"Whole Lotta Rosie"	Fishdick	1994	
Eläkeläiset	"Let There Be Rock" (as "Olkoon humppa")	Humppakäräjät	1994	
Annihilator	"Live Wire"	In Command	1996	
A.N.I.M.A.L	Highway to Hell	Usa Toda tu Fuerza	1999	
Quiet Riot	"Highway to Hell"	Alive and Well	1999	
Mark Kozelek	"Rock 'n' Roll Singer", "You Ain't Got a Hold on Me", "Bad Boy Boogie"	Rock 'n' Roll Singer	2000	The songs are sung in a folk ballad style.
Six Feet Under	"T.N.T."	Graveyard Classics	2000	
The Offspring	"Sin City"	Million Miles Away single.	2001	
Twisted Sister	"Sin City"	Twisted Forever	2001	
Joan Jett	"Dirty Deeds Done Dirt Cheap"	The Hit List / The Jett Age (Japanese Promo)	2001	
Iced Earth	"Highway to Hell", "It's a Long Way to the Top (If You Wanna Rock 'n' Roll)"	Tribute to the Gods	2002	
Illdisposed	"Beating Around the Bush"	Retro	2002	
Living Colour	"Back in Black"	Collideøscope	2003	
Shakira	"Back in Black"	Live & Off the Record	2004	
Synthetik FM featuring Fr/action	"Dirty Deeds Done Dirt Cheap"	Elektrokuted: 17 Metal and Rock classics revisited	2004	
The Dandy Warhols	"Hells Bells"	Come on Feel the Dandy Warhols	2004	
Graveyard BBQ	"Dirty Deeds Done Dirt Cheap"	Graveyard BBQ Greatest Hits Volume II	2007	
Richard Cheese	"You Shook Me All Night Long"	Viva la Vodka	2009	
Accept	"I'm A Rebel"	I'm A Rebel	1980	
Agression	"Touch Too Much"	For Those About to Rawk: A Punk Tribute to AC/DC	2002	
Angry Samoans	"Highway To Hell"	For Those About to Rawk: A Punk Tribute to AC/DC	2002	
Big & Rich	"You Shook Me All Night Long"	Between Raising Hell and Amazing Grace	2007	
Scott Ian and Dee Snider	"Walk All Over You"	Single	2010	
Loaded Dice	"Whole Lotta Rosie"	Rock n Roll Train A Tribute to ACDC	2011	
Coverheads	What You Do For Money Honey	Rock Cinco Estrellas	2012	
Anthrax	"T.N.T."	Anthems	2013	
Halestorm	"Shoot to Thrill"	ReAniMate 2.0: The CoVers EP	2013	
Massive	"If You Want Blood (You Got It)"	Four On The Floor (EP)	2014	
Ninna & Michelle	"You shook me all night long"	Tre Apor feat. Ulf on the box (EP)	2014	
Halestorm	"Mistress For Christmas"	Non-album single	2016	
Angus	"Dirty Deeds Done Dirt Cheap"	Dirty Deeds Done Dirt Cheap (single)	2019	
Angus	"Shoot to Thrill"	Shoot to thrill (single)	2020	
