= Stiff Upper Lip (album) =

2000 studio album by AC/DC

Studio album by AC/DC
- Released: 28 February 2000
- Recorded: September – November 1999
- Studio: The Warehouse (Vancouver)
- Genres: Hard rock; blues rock
- Length: 46:57
- Labels: Albert; East West; Elektra
- Producer: George Young

AC/DC chronology
Bonfire (1997)	Stiff Upper Lip (2000)	Black Ice (2008)

Singles from Stiff Upper Lip
- 1. "Stiff Upper Lip" Released: 21 January 2000 (UK); 2. "Safe in New York City" Released: 28 February 2000 (Aus.); 3. "Satellite Blues" Released: 8 January 2001 (Aus.)

Professional ratings
Review scores
Source	Rating
AllMusic	4/5 stars
Blender	2/5 stars
The Encyclopedia of Popular Music	3/5 stars
Entertainment Weekly	C+
Kerrang!	4/5 stars
NME	9/10
Now	2/5 stars
Q	4/5 stars
Rolling Stone	3/5 stars

Stiff Upper Lip is the fourteenth studio album by the Australian hard rock band AC/DC. It was released on 28 February 2000. The album was produced by George Young, older brother of Malcolm and Angus Young. It was the last AC/DC album that George produced before his death in 2017.

The album was re-released in the US in April 2007 as part of the AC/DC Remasters series. It was re-released in the UK in 2005.

== Background ==
The Young brothers began writing songs for what would become Stiff Upper Lip in the summer of 1997 in London and the Netherlands, with Malcolm on guitar and Angus on drums. By February 1998 the songs were completed. The band had planned on recording a new album with Canadian record producer Bruce Fairbairn, who had produced the enormously successful The Razors Edge and AC/DC Live, but Fairbairn died in May 1999.

The Youngs turned to their older brother George, who had produced 1988's Blow Up Your Video as well as the band's early albums with Harry Vanda, and Mike Fraser, who had co-produced 1995's Ballbreaker, with Rick Rubin, to complete Stiff Upper Lip.

== Recording ==
The album was recorded and mixed at Bryan Adams' Warehouse Studios in Vancouver, British Columbia, Canada between September and November 1999. 18 songs were recorded in all. In 2000, bassist Cliff Williams remarked to VH1's Behind the Music: "It's a killer album. It was a very easy-to-record album in as much as Malcolm and Angus had everything ready to go, so we basically just had to come along and perform as best we could."

According to Arnaud Durieux's memoir AC/DC: Maximum Rock & Roll, Malcolm takes a rare guitar solo on "Can't Stand Still", while Angus does the backing vocals on "Hold Me Back". The album delves even deeper into the band's blues roots than its predecessor Ballbreaker and features a remarkably clean sound. In an interview with Alan Di Perna of Guitar World, singer Brian Johnson commented on working with George Young:

In the past he's always worked with Harry [Vanda]. Not detracting from Harry, but it was kinda streamlined this time. You had no one to answer to or discuss things with except Malcolm or Angus. We were working pretty hard this time actually, from about 11 in the morning until one the next morning sometimes. Saturdays as well. It was good, though. George always had a game plan. I hate it when you're hanging around waiting for the next decision. George always had it all worked out.

== Composition ==
Angus Young explained in interviews that the album title occurred to him when he was stuck in traffic and began ruminating on how vital lips were in rock and roll culture, citing icons Elvis Presley and Mick Jagger, and carried a certain sneering defiance. He noted that he had contributed to this tradition himself:

There was a bit of that and also with us there's always been a bit of humour, too. Even when we started, I used to always say, "I've got bigger lips than Jagger and I've got bigger lips than Presley when I stick them out." Actually, if you look on the Highway to Hell album, there's my lip stuck up there like this [curls his lip]. I remember when I was a kid I saw an early black-and-white movie of Brigitte Bardot and she had those pouting lips and you go, "Well, yeah! I like what she's serving!"

Songs reportedly recorded for the album that went unreleased were: "Let It Go", "R.I.P. It Up", "Whistle Blower", "Rave On" and "The Cock Crows".

== Release ==
The album cover features a bronze statue of Angus, mimicked on tour in the form of a prop that was several storeys high. The three singles from it were the title track "Stiff Upper Lip", "Safe in New York City", and "Satellite Blues". In Australia, New Zealand and Europe, a two-disc tour edition of Stiff Upper Lip was released by Albert Productions in January 2001. This includes Stiff Upper Lip plus a disc comprising: "Cyberspace", the B-side of "Safe in New York City", five live tracks from 1996's No Bull, as well as three videos, for each of the singles.

The video for the title track – directed by Andy Morahan, – starts with the band driving down the street in a red 1997 Hummer H1 and being caught in a traffic jam. They pull into a back alley, get out, and begin to play the song on the street. The song that the band listens to before the car jam is "It's a Long Way to the Top (If You Wanna Rock 'n' Roll)", released when the late Bon Scott was a member.

In the wake of the 9/11 terrorist attacks, the song "Safe in New York City" was included in the 2001 Clear Channel memorandum, a list of "lyrically questionable" songs. Six other AC/DC songs made the list: "Dirty Deeds Done Dirt Cheap," "Shot Down in Flames," "Shoot to Thrill," "Hell's Bells," "T.N.T.," and "Highway to Hell".

In a May 2000 interview with Alan Di Perna for Guitar World – just over a year prior to the tragedy – Angus Young was asked if he really felt safe in New York City: "That song is a little tongue in cheek. Last time I was in New York, that's all people were talking about: how safe it was, how it was gonna be such a great place to live. For me, New York has always been a city of unpredictability. You can never guess what's going to happen next."

== Reception ==
Stiff Upper Lip rose to #7 on the U.S. Billboard chart and peaked at #12 in the United Kingdom. It hit #1 in Finland, Sweden, Germany, and Austria. It was better received by critics than Ballbreaker but was considered lacking in new ideas.

== Track listing ==
All tracks are written by Angus Young and Malcolm Young.

Stiff Upper Lip track listing
No.	Title	Length
1.	"Stiff Upper Lip"	3:34
2.	"Meltdown"	3:41
3.	"House of Jazz"	3:56
4.	"Hold Me Back"	3:59
5.	"Safe in New York City"	3:59
6.	"Can't Stand Still"	3:41
7.	"Can't Stop Rock 'n' Roll"	4:02
8.	"Satellite Blues"	3:46
9.	"Damned"	3:52
10.	"Come and Get It"	4:02
11.	"All Screwed Up"	4:36
12.	"Give It Up"	3:54
Total length:		46:57

=== 2001 deluxe edition disc 2 ===
No.	Title	Length
1.	"Cyberspace" (Non LP Track)	2:59
2.	"Back in Black (Live – Plaza de Toros, Madrid, 1996)" (Young, Young, Johnson)	3:41
3.	"Hard as a Rock (Live – Plaza de Toros, Madrid, 1996)"	4:51
4.	"Ballbreaker (Live – Plaza de Toros, Madrid, 1996)"	4:41
5.	"Whole Lotta Rosie (Live – Plaza de Toros, Madrid, 1996)" (Young, Young, Bon Scott)	5:27
6.	"Let There Be Rock (Live – Plaza de Toros, Madrid, 1996)" (Young, Young, Scott)	11:53
7.	"Stiff Upper Lip" (Music video)	3:50
8.	"Safe in New York City" (Music video)	4:01
9.	"Satellite Blues" (Music video)	3:55

== Stiff Upper Lip Live ==
Stiff Upper Lip Live

Video by AC/DC
- Released: 4 December 2001
- Recorded: 14 June 2001
- Venues: Olympiastadion, Munich, Germany
- Genres: Hard rock, blues rock
- Length: 140 min.
- Labels: Albert; Elektra; Warner Vision
- Director: Nick Morris
- Producer: Rocky Oldham

Stiff Upper Lip Live is the name of the live video released on 4 December 2001 by AC/DC, recorded on 14 June 2001 at the Olympiastadion in Munich, Germany, on their Stiff Upper Lip World Tour. The track listing is as follows:

1. "Stiff Upper Lip" (Young, Young)
2. "You Shook Me All Night Long" (Young, Young, Johnson)
3. "Problem Child" (Young, Young, Scott)
4. "Thunderstruck" (Young, Young)
5. "Hell Ain't a Bad Place to Be" (Young, Young, Scott)
6. "Hard as a Rock" (Young, Young)
7. "Shoot to Thrill" (Young, Young, Johnson)
8. "Rock and Roll Ain't Noise Pollution" (Young, Young, Johnson)
9. "What Do You Do for Money Honey" (Young, Young, Johnson)
10. "Bad Boy Boogie" (Young, Young, Scott)
11. "Hells Bells" (Young, Young, Johnson)
12. "Up to My Neck in You" (Young, Young, Scott)
13. "The Jack" (Young, Young, Scott)
14. "Back in Black" (Young, Young, Johnson)
15. "Dirty Deeds Done Dirt Cheap" (Young, Young, Scott)
16. "Highway to Hell" (Young, Young, Scott)
17. "Whole Lotta Rosie" (Young, Young, Scott)
18. "Let There Be Rock" (Young, Young, Scott)
19. "T.N.T." (Young, Young, Scott)
20. "For Those About to Rock (We Salute You)" (Young, Young, Johnson)
21. "Shot Down in Flames" (Young, Young, Scott)
- Mastered in 5.1 by Ted Jensen at Sterling Sound, NYC

=== Notes ===
- There was an original newsflash that was used for the European tour, but an alternate one was used instead for the film after the September 11 attacks. However, the original newsflash was made available on the Bonus disc of the 2007 DVD Plug Me In.

== Personnel ==
AC/DC

- Angus Young – lead guitar, backing vocals on "Hold Me Back"
- Malcolm Young – rhythm guitar, lead guitar on "Can't Stand Still", backing vocals
- Brian Johnson – lead vocals
- Cliff Williams – bass guitar, backing vocals
- Phil Rudd – drums

Additional personnel

- George Young – production
- Mike Fraser – engineering and mixing
- Dean Maher – assistant engineering
- George Marino – mastering
- Alli Truch – artwork

== Charts ==
=== Weekly charts ===
Weekly chart performance for Stiff Upper Lip
Chart (2000)	Peak position
Australian Albums (ARIA)	3
Austrian Albums (Ö3 Austria)	1
Belgian Albums (Ultratop Flanders)	17
Belgian Albums (Ultratop Wallonia)	10
Canadian Albums (Billboard)	5
Dutch Albums (Album Top 100)	36
Finnish Albums (Suomen virallinen lista)	1
French Albums (SNEP)	2
German Albums (Offizielle Top 100)	1
Hungarian Albums (MAHASZ)	6
Irish Albums (IRMA)	46
New Zealand Albums (RMNZ)	12
Norwegian Albums (VG-lista)	6
Swedish Albums (Sverigetopplistan)	1
Swiss Albums (Schweizer Hitparade)	2
UK Albums (Official Charts)	12
UK Rock & Metal Albums (Official Charts)	3
US Billboard 200	7

=== Year-end charts ===
Year-end chart performance for Stiff Upper Lip
Chart (2000)	Position
Australian Albums (ARIA)	76
Austrian Albums (Ö3 Austria)	24
Belgian Albums (Ultratop Flanders)	91
Canadian Albums (Nielsen SoundScan)	77
European Albums (Music & Media)	27
German Albums (Offizielle Top 100)	16
Swiss Albums (Schweizer Hitparade)	19
US Billboard 200	151

== Certifications ==
Certifications and sales for Stiff Upper Lip
Region	Certification	Certified units/sales
Argentina (CAPIF)	Gold	30,000^{^}
Australia (ARIA)	3× Platinum	210,000^{^}
Austria (IFPI Austria)	Gold	25,000^{*}
Canada (Music Canada)	2× Platinum	200,000^{‡}
Finland (Musiikkituottajat)	Gold	27,417
France (SNEP)	2× Gold	200,000^{*}
Germany (BVMI)	3× Gold	450,000^{^}
Spain (Promusicae)	3× Platinum	300,000^{^}
Sweden (GLF)	Gold	40,000^{^}
Switzerland (IFPI Switzerland)	Platinum	50,000^{^}
United Kingdom (BPI)	Gold	100,000^{‡}
United States (RIAA)	Platinum	1,000,000^{^}
Summaries
Europe (IFPI)	Platinum	1,000,000^{*}
^{*} Sales figures based on certification alone.^{^} Shipments figures based on certification alone.^{‡} Sales+streaming figures based on certification alone.
