= Dirty Deeds =

Dirty Deeds may refer to:

- Dirty Deeds (2002 film), starring Bryan Brown and Toni Collette
- Dirty Deeds (2005 film), starring Milo Ventimiglia and Lacey Chabert
- Dirty Deeds, a book in the Hardy Boys series

== See also ==
- Dirty Deeds Done Dirt Cheap, a 1976 album by AC/DC
  - "Dirty Deeds Done Dirt Cheap" (song), a 1976 song by AC/DC, covered by Joan Jett
