= Bonfire (AC/DC album) =

1997 box set by AC/DC

Box set by AC/DC
- Released: 17 November 1997
- Recorded: March 1975 – May 1980
- Venues: Livesaver, Bondi; Pavillon de Paris, Paris
- Studios: Albert (Sydney); Atlantic (New York City); NBC (Burbank); Criteria (Miami); Roundhouse (London); Compass Point (Nassau)
- Genre: Hard rock
- Length: 230:46
- Labels: Albert; East West
- Producers: Harry Vanda; George Young; Robert John "Mutt" Lange

AC/DC chronology
| Ballbreaker (1995) | Bonfire (1997) | Stiff Upper Lip (2000) |

Professional ratings
Review scores
| Source | Rating |
|---|---|
| Allmusic | 3.5/5 stars |
| The Encyclopedia of Popular Music | 4/5 stars |
| NME | 8/10 stars |
| Uncut | 4/5 stars |
| Vox | 5/5 stars |

Bonfire is a five-disc box set by Australian rock band AC/DC, released in 1997, and remastered with a release in Digipak format in 2003. It was originally conceived to mark what would have been the 50th birthday of Bon Scott, the band's previous lead vocalist, who died of alcohol-related misadventure in 1980. The release includes the two disc soundtrack for the film Let There Be Rock, a live recording from the Atlantic Records studio in New York, some previously unreleased early material and a remastered version of the 1980 Back in Black album.

== Overview ==
The album was originally released in 1997 with the CDs all packaged individually in jewel cases, complete with full artwork. The original issue also features a poster, a backstage pass, keyring and a few other extras depending on the region. When the album was reissued in 2003, it was packaged in a large digipak, similar to a longbox, which featured either four- or five-disc trays. The four-tray versions contained the remastered Back in Black in its own case with booklet. All versions of the box feature a large book full of liner notes and rare pictures of the band, mostly from before Scott's death.

The box set was the subject of some derision from AC/DC fans for its limited content and select few rarities. AC/DC defended the release, stating that there was very little recorded by Scott that was not already released.

The Australian version is slightly different; Let There Be Rock: Live in Paris became a single disc album by removing two tracks, "Walk All Over You" and "T.N.T.", which were added to the Volts album instead, creating a four disc boxset.

== Track listing ==
=== Live from the Atlantic Studios ===
Recorded live on 7 December 1977 at the Atlantic Recording Studios, New York, New York.

All tracks are written by Angus Young, Malcolm Young and Bon Scott.

| No. | Title | Length |
|---|---|---|
| 1. | "Live Wire" (T.N.T.) | 6:16 |
| 2. | "Problem Child" (Dirty Deeds Done Dirt Cheap) | 4:40 |
| 3. | "High Voltage" (T.N.T.) | 5:57 |
| 4. | "Hell Ain't a Bad Place to Be" (Let There Be Rock) | 4:14 |
| 5. | "Dog Eat Dog" (Let There Be Rock) | 4:42 |
| 6. | "The Jack" (T.N.T.) | 8:37 |
| 7. | "Whole Lotta Rosie" (Let There Be Rock) | 5:11 |
| 8. | "Rocker" (T.N.T.) | 5:33 |
| Total length: | | 45:38 |

=== Let There Be Rock: The Movie - Live in Paris ===
Recorded live on 9 December 1979 at the Pavillon de Paris, Paris, France.

All tracks are written by Angus Young, Malcolm Young and Bon Scott.

Disc one
| No. | Title | Length |
|---|---|---|
| 1. | "Live Wire" (T.N.T.) | 8:04 |
| 2. | "Shot Down in Flames" (Highway to Hell) | 3:39 |
| 3. | "Hell Ain't a Bad Place to Be" (Let There Be Rock) | 4:31 |
| 4. | "Sin City" (Powerage) | 5:25 |
| 5. | "Walk All Over You" (Highway to Hell) | 5:07 |
| 6. | "Bad Boy Boogie" (Let There Be Rock) | 13:21 |

Disc two
| No. | Title | Length |
|---|---|---|
| 1. | "The Jack" (T.N.T.) | 6:05 |
| 2. | "Highway to Hell" (Highway to Hell) | 3:31 |
| 3. | "Girls Got Rhythm" (Highway to Hell) | 3:20 |
| 4. | "High Voltage" (T.N.T.) | 6:32 |
| 5. | "Whole Lotta Rosie" (Let There Be Rock) | 4:55 |
| 6. | "Rocker" (T.N.T.) | 10:45 |
| 7. | "T.N.T." (T.N.T.) | 4:14 |
| 8. | "Let There Be Rock" (Let There Be Rock) | 7:34 |
| Total length: | | 79:02 |

=== Volts ===
A compilation of some alternative versions of songs recorded for the albums Let There Be Rock and Highway to Hell, and some songs previously released.

All tracks are written by Angus Young, Malcolm Young and Bon Scott, except where noted.

| No. | Title | Writer(s) | Length |
|---|---|---|---|
| 1. | "Dirty Eyes" (first title and lyrics to the riffs of "Whole Lotta Rosie") | | 3:21 |
| 2. | "Touch Too Much" (same title as the track on Highway to Hell with other lyrics and music) | | 6:34 |
| 3. | "If You Want Blood (You've Got It)" (first recording of the track) | | 4:28 |
| 4. | "Back Seat Confidential" (Bon's first title and lyrics to the riffs that ended up as "Beatin' Around the Bush") | | 5:24 |
| 5. | "Get It Hot" (same title as the track on Highway to Hell with other lyrics and music) | | 4:17 |
| 6. | "Sin City" (live 1978 from The Midnight Special) | | 4:58 |
| 7. | "She's Got Balls" (live 1977 from The Bondi Lifesaver, Sydney) | | 7:57 |
| 8. | "School Days" (from T.N.T. (Australian Release)) | Chuck Berry | 5:24 |
| 9. | "It's a Long Way to the Top (If You Wanna Rock 'n' Roll)" (from T.N.T. (Australian Release) (slightly longer version than the one in High Voltage) | | 5:15 |
| 10. | "Ride On" (from Dirty Deeds Done Dirt Cheap, followed by brief interviews) | | 5:47 (10:03) |
| Total length: | | | 57:12 |

=== Back in Black ===
All tracks are written by Angus Young, Malcolm Young and Brian Johnson.

| No. | Title | Length |
|---|---|---|
| 1. | "Hells Bells" | 5:13 |
| 2. | "Shoot to Thrill" | 5:18 |
| 3. | "What Do You Do for Money Honey" | 3:36 |
| 4. | "Given the Dog a Bone" | 3:32 |
| 5. | "Let Me Put My Love into You" | 4:15 |
| 6. | "Back in Black" | 4:16 |
| 7. | "You Shook Me All Night Long" | 3:30 |
| 8. | "Have a Drink on Me" | 3:59 |
| 9. | "Shake a Leg" | 4:06 |
| 10. | "Rock and Roll Ain't Noise Pollution" | 4:16 |
| Total length: | | 42:11 |

== Charts ==
Chart performance for Bonfire
| Chart (1997) | Peak position |
|---|---|
| Australian Albums (ARIA) | 21 |
| French Albums (SNEP) | 56 |
| German Albums (Offizielle Top 100) | 71 |
| Swedish Albums (Sverigetopplistan) | 60 |
| US Billboard 200 | 90 |

== Certifications ==
Certifications for Bonfire
| Region | Certification | Certified units/sales |
|---|---|---|
| United States (RIAA) | Platinum | 1,000,000^{^} |
^{^} Shipments figures based on certification alone.
