= Love at First Feel =

1977 single by AC/DC

Single by AC/DC

from the album Dirty Deeds Done Dirt Cheap
- B-side: "Problem Child"
- Released: January 1977
- Recorded: September 1976
- Studio: Vineyard (London)
- Genre: Hard rock
- Length: 3:13
- Label: Albert
- Songwriter(s): Angus Young; Malcolm Young; Bon Scott
- Producer(s): Harry Vanda; George Young

AC/DC singles chronology
"Dirty Deeds Done Dirt Cheap" (1976)	"Love at First Feel" (1977)	"Dog Eat Dog" (1977)

"Love at First Feel" is a song by Australian hard rock band AC/DC. It is the second track of the international version of their album Dirty Deeds Done Dirt Cheap, released in November 1976, and was written by Angus Young, Malcolm Young, and Bon Scott. The international version was not released in the United States until 1981.

"Love at First Feel" was not included on Dirty Deeds Done Dirt Cheap's original Australian edition, released in September 1976, making it one of only two tracks from international AC/DC albums not available on the band's Australian albums. (The other is "Cold Hearted Man", released on European pressings of Powerage.) Conversely, several songs that are available on Australian AC/DC albums did not see overseas release until more than thirty years later. However, "Love at First Feel" was released in Australia as a single in January 1977, with "Problem Child" as its B-side, which peaked in the Kent Music Report Singles Chart Top 100.

Singer and songwriter Mark Kozelek does a cover of this track on his album of AC/DC covers entitled What's Next to the Moon.

French band Trust, who supported AC/DC on their Paris date in the fall of 1978, re-worked "Love at First Feel" with French lyrics for their 1978 single, "Prends Pas Ton Flingue" b/w "Paris by Night". The song later became the title track of their 1988 live album, Paris by Night.

== Personnel ==
- Bon Scott – lead vocals
- Angus Young – lead guitar
- Malcolm Young – rhythm guitar, backing vocals
- Mark Evans – bass
- Phil Rudd – drums

== Charts ==
Chart (1977)	Peak position
Australia (Kent Music Report)	63
