= Safe in New York City =

2000 single by AC/DC

Single by AC/DC

from the album Stiff Upper Lip
- B-side: "Cyberspace" "Back in Black" (live)
- Released: 28 February 2000
- Recorded: September – October 1999
- Studio: The Warehouse (Vancouver)
- Genre: Hard rock
- Length: 3:59
- Label: East West; Elektra
- Songwriter(s): Angus Young; Malcolm Young
- Producer(s): George Young

AC/DC singles chronology
"Stiff Upper Lip" (2000)	"Safe in New York City" (2000)	"Satellite Blues" (2001)

Music video
- "Safe In New York City" on YouTube

"Safe in New York City" is a song by Australian rock band AC/DC, from their 2000 album Stiff Upper Lip. The song, which was written by members and brothers, Angus and Malcolm Young, was released as a single on 28 February 2000. It was co-produced by their older brother George and the band. It reached No. 21 on the US Billboard Mainstream Rock chart.

The video to the song, directed by Andy Morahan, shows the band playing a busy tunnel in the city, surrounded by armed police officers. The promo CD single contained a live version of the song, which was recorded on 13 September 2000 at the America West Arena in Phoenix, Arizona. This live version was later re-released nine years later on the box set Backtracks.

The track gained poignancy after the September 11 attacks on the World Trade Center in New York City. The song was included in the Clear Channel memorandum, which is a list of songs Clear Channel deemed "questionable" to play so soon after the attacks. Angus Young said that although originally the lyrics were meant to make fun of Rudy Giuliani's claim that he had cleaned up Manhattan: "to me New York is a city where you can never predict what's coming next."

== Single track listing ==
All tracks are written by Angus Young, Malcolm Young; unless otherwise indicated

No.	Title	Length
1.	"Safe in New York City" (LP Version)	3:59
2.	"Cyberspace" (Non LP Track)	2:57
3.	"Back in Black" (A. Young, M. Young, Brian Johnson) (Recorded live at Plaza De Toros, Madrid))	4:07

== Personnel ==
- Brian Johnson – lead vocals
- Angus Young – lead guitar
- Malcolm Young – rhythm guitar
- Cliff Williams – bass guitar
- Phil Rudd – drums
- Producer – George Young, AC/DC
