= Whole Lotta Rosie =

1977 single by AC/DC

Single by AC/DC

from the album Let There Be Rock
- B-side: "Dog Eat Dog"
- Released: 20 May 1977 (Netherlands) (Note: Dutch Top 40 magazine); August 1977 (Germany)
- Recorded: 1977
- Genre: Hard rock; rock and roll
- Length: 5:20
- Label: Atlantic
- Songwriters: Angus Young; Bon Scott; Malcolm Young
- Producers: Harry Vanda; George Young

AC/DC singles chronology
"Let There Be Rock" (1977)	"Whole Lotta Rosie" (1977)	"Rock 'n' Roll Damnation" (1978)

Alternative cover
- Cover of AC/DC's 1978 single

"Whole Lotta Rosie" is a song by Australian hard rock band AC/DC. It is the eighth and final track on the band's fourth Australian album, Let There Be Rock, released in Australia in March 1977, and was written by Angus Young, Malcolm Young, and Bon Scott. It is also the eighth and final track on the international version of the album, released in June the same year.

It was released as a single in a few countries in 1977, backed by "Dog Eat Dog". In 1978, the live version from If You Want Blood You've Got It, which had been recorded in Glasgow on 30 April 1978, was also released as a single in October 1978.

== Composition ==
The song is about an obese Tasmanian woman, Rosie, with whom the singer (Bon Scott) had a one-night stand at the Freeway Gardens Motel in North Melbourne. In addition to pointing out the woman's size, the singer finds her to be one of the most talented lovers he has ever experienced.

The song's first verse reveals Rosie's substantial physical measurements (42"-39"-56"), and that she weighs nineteen stone, or 266 pounds (121 kg). On the Live from the Atlantic Studios disc, however, Scott describes the titular woman as "... a Tasmanian devil ... weighs 305 pounds (138 kg)...," a measurement that differs from the "nineteen stone" lyric.

In 1998, speaking to Vox magazine, Angus Young remembered:

We'd been in Tasmania and after the show [Bon Scott] said he was going to check out a few clubs. He said he'd got about 100 yards down the street when he heard this yell: 'Hey! Bon!' He looked around and saw this leg and thought: 'Oh well!' From what he said, there was this Rosie woman and a friend of hers. They were plying him with drinks and Rosie said to him: 'This month I've slept with 28 famous people,' and Bon went: 'Oh yeah?!' Anyway, in the morning he said he woke up pinned against the wall, he said he opened one eye and saw her lean over to her friend and whisper: '29!' There's very few people who'll go out and write a song about a big fat lady, but Bon said it was worthy.

In 2021, the woman the song was written about was identified by British-Australian AC/DC biographer Jesse Fink as Rosemaree (or stylized as Rose-Maree) Garcia, an Australian sex worker who saw Scott for some time before he went to England. Rosie was indeed born in Launceston, Tasmania, lived in St Kilda and died in the Melbourne suburb of Prahran in 1979, aged 22.

In 2023, Fink released the first known photograph of Rosie Garcia.

== Early version ==
The song's main riff was also featured on an earlier recording with different lyrics, titled "Dirty Eyes", which saw official release on Volts, part of the Bonfire box set. "Dirty Eyes" features a different chord progression in the chorus, as well as a slower tempo than "Rosie".

In September 1976, "Dirty Eyes" was first recorded by AC/DC, along with "Carry Me Home" and "Love at First Feel" for a possible EP. This recording is possibly the version that was later issued on the Bonfire boxed set. The EP was scrapped, leaving "Love at First Feel" as a fill-in for the upcoming International Dirty Deeds Done Dirt Cheap album and "Carry Me Home" as a b-side. In the following months, "Dirty Eyes" was recrafted into "Whole Lotta Rosie," and recorded during the Let There Be Rock sessions of January–February 1977.

When the song was released as a single in 1978 it was heavily edited, making the song considerably shorter. A big part of the guitar solo was left out as well as the characteristic guitar-band duel.

== Live recordings and performances ==
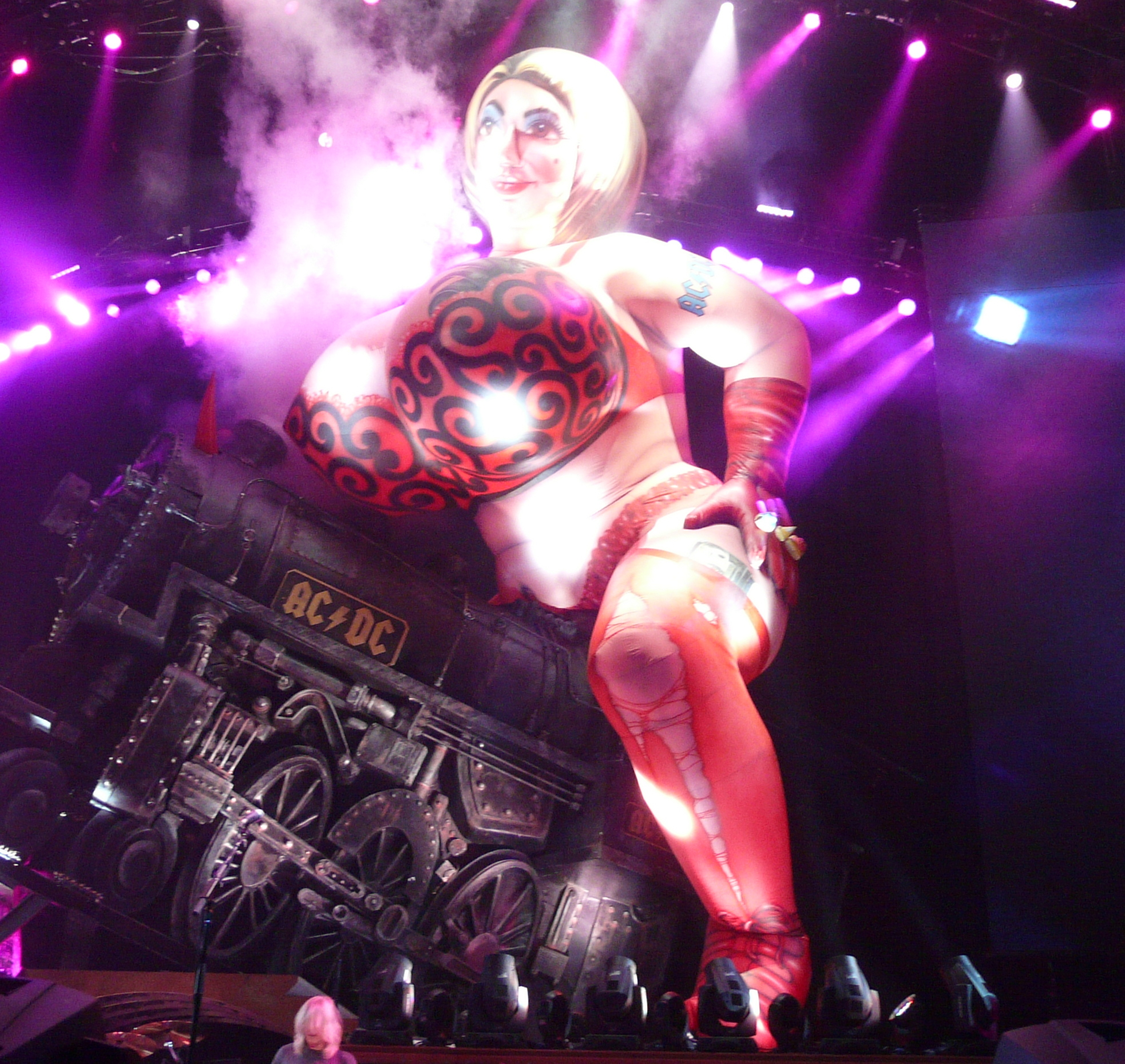
"Rosie" on the 2008 Black Ice Tour

One of AC/DC's most popular songs, "Whole Lotta Rosie" has been included on each of the band's official live albums: three with Scott: 1978 If You Want Blood You've Got It (short version which misses the second guitar solo), Live from the Atlantic Studios, Let There Be Rock: The Movie – Live in Paris, the latter two released in 1997 as part of the Bonfire (1997) box set, and also four with Brian Johnson (released on 1992 Live, 1992 Live: 2 CD Collector's Edition, the tour edition of 2000 Stiff Upper Lip, and also on 2012 Live at River Plate). The only other song that appears on all these releases is "The Jack". A live video of "Whole Lotta Rosie" is also featured on the 2005 DVD Family Jewels, from a 1978 performance on the BBC's TV concert series Rock Goes to College, on which Scott refers to Rosie as the "biggest, fattest woman who ever fornicated."

The song was first played live in February 1977, with the 15 February 1977 Perth Entertainment Centre show being the earliest known performance (and possibly the very first time the song was played live since it was not played at the other few shows before. Bootlegs of the Perth show and the few shows before exist). Since then, the song has been played at almost every AC/DC concert.

When the song is performed live, the crowd will usually shout "Angus!" in between each of the opening riffs. This has its origins in the version heard on If You Want Blood You've Got It.

The latest live performances of "Whole Lotta Rosie" were accompanied by a giant, inflatable "Rosie" as seen on the Live at Donington video. The inflatable Rosie was first used on the 1990/91 "The Razors Edge" tour. In March 2005, Q magazine placed the live version from If You Want Blood ... at number 16 in its list of the 100 Greatest Guitar Tracks.

Rosie was seen (at the same table as Brian Johnson) during the cartoon intro video that was played on the Black Ice World Tour. The song was also used in Brian Johnson's audition as Scott's successor.

== Covers ==
"Whole Lotta Rosie" was covered by Guns N' Roses, who included it on the 1987 UK vinyl singles of "Welcome to the Jungle" and the 1988 Live from the Jungle EP. It has also been played as part of Guns N' Roses' concerts.

Australian psychedelic band Electric Hippies recorded a cover in 1995 for the Fuse Box alternative tribute album.

It was also covered by W.A.S.P. on the American version of the 1996 Still Not Black Enough album.

The Japanese power metal band Galneryus released a cover of it, on their 2007 Voices from the Past EP, which is an EP of 5 cover songs.

Another cover version, by Steel Panther, was released in 2010 on The Metal Forge Volume Two (A Tribute To AC/DC) by Metal Hammer.

Bullet for My Valentine also released a cover of the song as a bonus track on their 2013 album Temper Temper.

== In other media ==
A live version of this song is included on AC/DC Live: Rock Band Track Pack.

== Track listing ==
1977 7-inch single (Netherlands: Atlantic ATL 109 92)

1. "Whole Lotta Rosie" (Young, Young, Scott) – 3:33 edit
2. "Dog Eat Dog" (Young, Young, Scott) – 3:35

1977 7-inch single (Germany: Atlantic 109 92)

1. "Whole Lotta Rosie" (Young, Young, Scott) – 4:00 edit
2. "Dog Eat Dog" (Young, Young, Scott) – 3:35

1978 7-inch Live single (UK: Atlantic HM 4)

1. "Whole Lotta Rosie" (Young, Young, Scott) – 3:35
2. "Hell Ain't a Bad Place to Be" (Young, Young, Scott) – 4:30

== Personnel ==
- Bon Scott – lead vocals
- Angus Young – lead guitar
- Malcolm Young – rhythm guitar
- Mark Evans – bass
- Phil Rudd – drums
- Producers: Harry Vanda, George Young

== Charts ==
=== Weekly charts ===
Chart (1978)	Peak position
Belgium (Ultratop 50 Flanders)	12
Netherlands (Dutch Top 40)	3
Netherlands (Single Top 100)	5
Chart (1980)	Peak position
UK Singles (OCC)	36
Chart (2012)	Peak position
UK Singles (OCC)	68

=== Year-end charts ===
Chart (1978)	Position
Belgium (Ultratop Flanders)	82
Netherlands (Dutch Top 40)	26
Netherlands (Single Top 100)	47

== Certifications ==
Region	Certification	Certified units/sales
Canada (Music Canada)	Gold	40,000^{‡}
New Zealand (RMNZ)	Gold	15,000^{‡}
United Kingdom (BPI) Sales since 2011	Silver	200,000^{‡}
^{‡} Sales+streaming figures based on certification alone.
