= Dirty Deeds Done Dirt Cheap (song) =

1976 single by AC/DC

Single by AC/DC

from the album Dirty Deeds Done Dirt Cheap
- B-side: "R.I.P. (Rock in Peace)"
- Released: 5 October 1976 (Aus); 18 February 1977 (UK)
- Recorded: 1976
- Studio: Albert (Sydney)
- Genre: Hard rock; Heavy metal
- Length: 4:11
- Label: Albert
- Songwriters: Angus Young; Bon Scott; Malcolm Young
- Producers: Harry Vanda; George Young

AC/DC singles chronology
"Jailbreak" (1976)	"Dirty Deeds Done Dirt Cheap" (1976)	"Love at First Feel" (1977)

Dirty Deeds Done Dirt Cheap" is a hard rock song by the Australian band AC/DC. Written by group members Angus Young, Malcolm Young, and Bon Scott, it was recorded for the title track of their album Dirty Deeds Done Dirt Cheap, released in September 1976.

It was also released as a single – first in Australia in October 1976 with "R.I.P. (Rock in Peace)" as its B-side, and then in the UK in February 1977 as a maxi-single with "Big Balls" and "The Jack" as its B-sides. Once the Dirty Deeds album was finally released in the US in 1981 the "Dirty Deeds..." single was released there (backed by "Highway To Hell"), where it reached number four on the then-new Mainstream Rock Tracks chart.

The song ranked No. 24 on VH1's 40 Greatest Metal Songs and in 2009 it was named the 31st best hard rock song of all time also by VH1.

It features a backing vocal consisting of a heavy breathing sound, made on the downbeat during verses. It also features the title in a spoken-word style at the end of the chorus; plus a scream at the end of the song. The full-length recording (approximately 4:11) has the title of the song chanted four times starting at 3:09, but on the more common edited version (approximately 3:51) the chant is heard only twice.

== Composition ==
The song's narrator, a hitman, invites people experiencing problems to either call his phone number or visit him at his home, at which point he will perform assorted unsavoury and violent acts to resolve said problems for bargain-basement prices. Situations in which he offers assistance include those involving lewd high school headmasters and significant others who are either adulterous or who persistently find fault with their partners. As detailed by the song, the "dirty deeds" performed at low cost include:

- Concrete shoes
- Cyanide
- TNT
- Neckties
- Contracts
- High voltage

Two of the services offered share names with AC/DC's first two Australian albums, T.N.T. and High Voltage. They are also the names of songs that appeared on Australia's T.N.T. and the international version of High Voltage.

The song is written in E minor.

== Influences ==
The phrase "Dirty Deeds Done Dirt Cheap" is an homage to the cartoon Beany and Cecil, which Angus Young watched when he was a child. One of the cartoon's characters was named Dishonest John, who carried a business card that read: "Dirty Deeds Done Dirt Cheap. Holidays, Sundays, and Special Rates." “It was Angus that came up with the song title…" Malcolm Young told Mark Blake. "It was based on a cartoon character that had the phrase as his calling card."

== Use in popular culture ==
The song was the namesake for the Stand in the manga JoJo's Bizarre Adventure: Steel Ball Run, used by Funny Valentine.

It was used in the background of Captain Boomerang's introduction in the 2016 film Suicide Squad.

The song was featured uncredited in the second episode of Koala Man, and also in the first episode of Off Campus.

== Controversy ==
In 1981, Norman and Marilyn White of Libertyville, Illinois filed a $250,000 lawsuit in Lake County, Illinois Circuit Court against Atlantic Records and its distributors because, they alleged, their telephone number was included in the song, resulting in hundreds of prank phone calls. Their attorney told the Chicago Tribune that the song's 36-24-36 digits were followed by a "hey!", which to his clients sounded like an "8", thus creating the couple's phone number.

== Chart history ==
Chart (1976)	Peak position
Australia (Kent Music Report)	29
New Zealand Singles Chart	34

Chart (1980–81)	Peak position
UK singles chart	47
US Mainstream Rock	4

== Certifications ==
Region	Certification	Certified units/sales
Canada (Music Canada)	3× Platinum	240,000^{‡}
Mexico (AMPROFON)	Gold	30,000^{‡}
New Zealand (RMNZ)	Platinum	30,000^{‡}
Spain (Promusicae)	Gold	30,000^{‡}
United Kingdom (BPI)	Silver	200,000^{‡}
United States (RIAA)	2× Platinum	2,000,000^{‡}
^{‡} Sales+streaming figures based on certification alone.

== Personnel ==
- Bon Scott – lead vocals
- Angus Young – lead guitar
- Malcolm Young – rhythm guitar, backing vocals
- Mark Evans – bass guitar
- Phil Rudd – drums
- Producers: Harry Vanda, George Young

== Live recordings ==
"Dirty Deeds Done Dirt Cheap" (live)

Single by AC/DC

from the album AC/DC Live
- B-side: "Shoot to Thrill" (live)
- Released: February 1993
- Recorded: 23 April 1991
- Venue: NEC (Birmingham)
- Genre: Hard rock
- Length: 5:02
- Label: ATCO
- Songwriters: Bon Scott; Angus Young; Malcolm Young
- Producer: Bruce Fairbairn

AC/DC singles chronology
"Highway to Hell" (live) (1992)	"Dirty Deeds Done Dirt Cheap" (live) (1993)	"Big Gun" (1993)

Music video
- "Dirty Deeds Done Dirt Cheap" (AC/DC Live) on YouTube

"Dirty Deeds Done Dirt Cheap" has only been included on one official AC/DC live album, 1992's Live, sung by Scott's replacement Brian Johnson. This live version was released as a single. A video clip for the single was released containing footage from the Live at Donington home video, as well as other old clips mixed in the video. This video clip was later released on the DVD Family Jewels Disc 3, as part of the 2009 box set Backtracks.

An earlier version with Bon Scott, recorded live in Sydney (Haymarket) at the Festival of Sydney on 30 January 1977, was released on an Australian only radio 2JJ compilation album titled Long Live The Evolution. This live version was later released on Backtracks.

In 2007 on the Plug Me In three track bonus CD from Best Buy, a live version from Detroit, Michigan, (Joe Louis Arena) 17 or 18 November 1983 was released.

== Joan Jett cover ==
"Dirty Deeds"

Single by Joan Jett

from the album The Hit List
- B-side: "Pretty Vacant"
- Released: January 1990
- Genre: Rock
- Length: 3:18
- Label: Chrysalis; Blackheart
- Songwriters: Angus Young; Bon Scott; Malcolm Young

Joan Jett singles chronology
"Little Liar" (1988)	"Dirty Deeds" (1990)	"Love Hurts" (1990)

American singer-songwriter Joan Jett recorded the song, shortening the title to "Dirty Deeds", and included it on her LP, The Hit List, in early 1990. It was released as a single, backed by a cover of the Sex Pistols' "Pretty Vacant", and charted internationally.

=== Charts ===
Chart (1990)	Peak position
Australia (ARIA)	59
Canada Top Singles (RPM)	81
New Zealand (Recorded Music NZ)	14
UK Singles (Official Charts)	69
US Billboard Hot 100	36
US Mainstream Rock Airplay (Billboard)	23
US Cash Box Top 100	42
