= Let There Be Rock (song) =

1977 single by AC/DC

- Australian record label

Single by AC/DC

from the album Let There Be Rock
- B-side: "Problem Child"
- Released: 30 September 1977 (UK); 31 October 1977 (Aus)
- Recorded: 1977
- Studio: Albert (Sydney)
- Genre: Hard rock
- Length: 6:10
- Label: Albert; Atlantic
- Songwriters: Angus Young; Malcolm Young; Bon Scott
- Producers: Harry Vanda; George Young

AC/DC singles chronology
"Dog Eat Dog" (1977)	"Let There Be Rock" (1977)	"Whole Lotta Rosie" (1978)

Music video
- "Let There Be Rock" on YouTube

"Let There Be Rock" is a song by Australian hard rock band AC/DC. It is the third and title track of their album Let There Be Rock, released in March 1977, and was written by Angus Young, Malcolm Young, and Bon Scott.

It was also released as a single, with a B-side of "Problem Child", in 1977.

== Composition ==
The song provides an encapsulated, fictionalised version of the history of rock 'n' roll. Building on a line from the Chuck Berry song "Roll Over Beethoven": "... tell Tchaikovsky the news", "Let There Be Rock" reveals that Tchaikovsky did in fact receive the message and subsequently shared it with the masses, resulting in the rise of rock 'n' roll.

Following rock's birth, rock bands appeared everywhere, musicians found fame (while businesses made money off their efforts), and millions of people learned how to play electric guitar. The third and final verse speaks of a "42-decibel" rock band playing good, loud music in an establishment called "The Shaking Hand". This is usually changed to "92-decibel" in live versions of the song. After the final verse, the song ends with an extended solo by Angus Young, which consists mainly of tremolo picking, string bends, and hammer-ons.

== Live recordings ==
"Let There Be Rock" has been included on four of the band's six official live albums: If You Want Blood You've Got It (sung by Bon Scott, 1978), Live: 2 CD Collector's Edition (sung by Scott's replacement Brian Johnson, 1992), Let There Be Rock: The Movie (Scott, 1979), released in 1997 as part of the Bonfire box set, Stiff Upper Lip Tour Edition (Johnson, 2001), recorded from Plaza De Toros in Madrid from 1996, and Live At River Plate (Johnson, 2012), with the last recorded during AC/DC's Black Ice World Tour at River Plate Stadium in Buenos Aires on 4 December 2009.

Live performances of the song often go into a section not included on the studio version, with Angus Young performing an extended solo without accompaniment.

It is the final song played in Let There Be Rock: The Movie and at the immediate conclusion the words "To Bon" appear on the screen. On recent tours, the song has concluded the regular set before the band reappears for encores.

== Music video ==
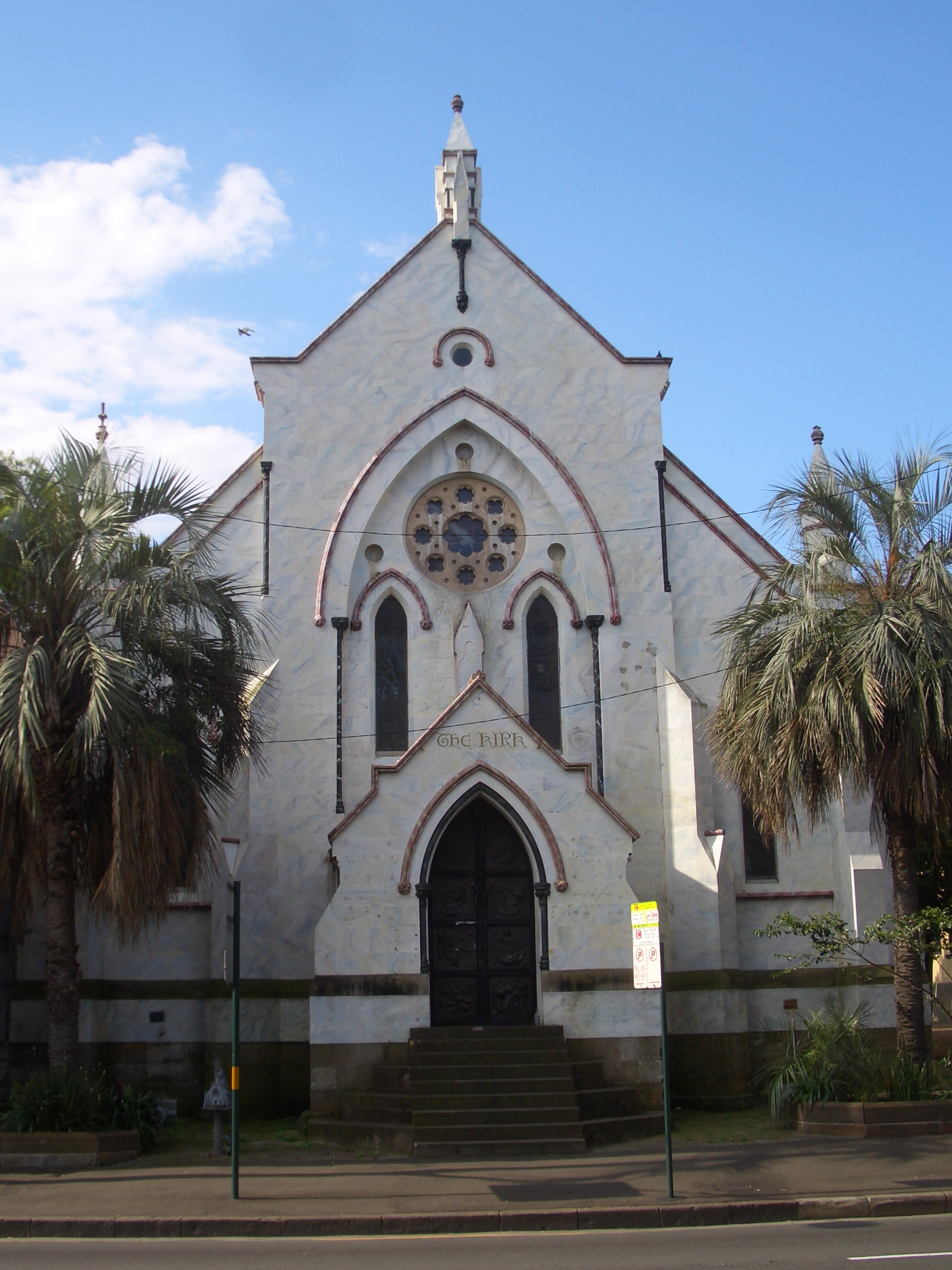
The Kirk in Surry Hills, Sydney, the filming location of the music video

The music video for "Let There Be Rock" was filmed in July 1977. It was recorded in the Kirk Gallery church in Surry Hills, Sydney and featured Bon Scott, Angus Young, Malcolm Young, Phil Rudd, and Cliff Williams, who replaced Mark Evans as the band's bassist shortly after the Let There Be Rock album was released. This marked one of Williams' first public appearances with AC/DC. Scott was dressed as a priest and the rest of the band as altar boys, with Angus Young wearing a halo prop on his head. Towards the end of the video it shows Angus, and the rest of the band jamming while he plays the guitar. In an alternate ending of the video, the colors are morphed and the camera zooms in on the stained glass window. According to an interview with the Young brothers, Scott injured himself in the final jump from the podium. In the video and studio recording, Scott also sings the pre-chorus incorrectly, introducing 'sound' before 'light.' This is corrected during live performances of the song.

== Critical reception ==
"Let There Be Rock" is widely considered one of the band's best songs. The Guardian ranked the song number four on its list of the 40 greatest AC/DC songs, and the British rock magazine Kerrang! ranked the song number three on its list of the 20 greatest AC/DC songs.

== Appearances in popular culture ==
The song was also alluded to in the Drive-By Truckers song of the same name from 2001's Southern Rock Opera. The song specifically mentions Bon Scott, Randy Rhoads, as well as making references to other deceased rock stars such as members of Lynyrd Skynyrd and Phil Lynott of Thin Lizzy fame.

== Cover versions ==
- The British thrash metal band Onslaught released a cover version of this song on their 1987 EP with the same title and again on their 1989 album In Search of Sanity. The In Search of Sanity version peaked at number 50 on the UK Singles Chart.
- The Australian punk rock group the Hard-Ons recorded a cover version featuring Henry Rollins on lead vocals, and released it as a single in 1991. The song peaked at number 65 on the ARIA Charts in July 1991.
- The Serbian funk rock band Deca Loših Muzičara released a cover version of the song in 1997.

== Personnel ==
- Bon Scott – vocals
- Angus Young – lead guitar
- Malcolm Young – rhythm guitar
- Mark Evans – bass
- Phil Rudd – drums

=== Production ===
- Producers: Harry Vanda, George Young

== Charts ==
Chart (1977/78)	Peak position
Australian (Kent Music Report)	82

== Certifications ==
Region	Certification	Certified units/sales
Canada (Music Canada)	Gold	40,000^{‡}
^{‡} Sales+streaming figures based on certification alone.
