= Rock 'n' Roll Damnation =

1978 single by AC/DC

Single by AC/DC

from the album Powerage
- B-side: "Cold Hearted Man" (Aus) "Sin City" (UK) "Kicked in the Teeth" (US)
- Released: 26 May 1978 (UK)
- Recorded: March 1978
- Studio: Albert (Sydney)
- Genre: Hard rock
- Length: 3:37 (album version); 3:05 (single version)
- Label: Albert; Atlantic
- Songwriters: Angus Young; Malcolm Young; Bon Scott
- Producers: Harry Vanda; George Young

AC/DC singles chronology
"Whole Lotta Rosie" (1978)	"Rock 'n' Roll Damnation" (1978)	"Highway to Hell" (1979)

Music video
- "Rock 'n' Roll Damnation" on YouTube

"Rock 'n' Roll Damnation" is a single by the Australian rock band AC/DC, and the first track on their Powerage album, released in 1978. The single version is an abbreviated version of the album track, with a time of 3:05, as opposed to the album track's length of 3:37. The album track "Sin City" was the B-side in the UK, Germany, Belgium, and Japan. In the US, Canada, and the Netherlands, it was "Kicked in the Teeth," also from the album. In Australia, however, the B-side was "Cold Hearted Man," which appeared on the initial UK and European pressings of the album, and was eventually removed when "Rock 'n' Roll Damnation" was added (see below).

== Song details ==
Written by Angus Young, Malcolm Young and Bon Scott, it was played live by the band during the Powerage tour, and was also played live during the 2003 world tour, sung by Brian Johnson, Scott's replacement since his death in 1980. It also appeared on the 1978 live album If You Want Blood You've Got It. The song was also featured on the soundtrack album for Iron Man 2.

"Rock 'n' Roll Damnation" was the final track recorded during the Powerage sessions, after the record company persuaded the band to go back into the studio and come up with a radio-friendly single that could garner some airplay. The move found some success, giving the band its first charting single in the UK where it peaked at #24. The song features handclaps and maracas and does not have a traditional guitar solo, unlike most other AC/DC songs.

Record World said the song "has a monster guitar hook and rocks harder than just about anything around."

On the first pressing of the UK version of Powerage, "Rock 'n' Roll Damnation" does not appear; side 1 opens with "Gimme a Bullet". Some later UK and European pressings tacked the single version of "Rock 'n' Roll Damnation" on as the opening track of the album. Eventually the full version of the song became the standard.

"Cold Hearted Man," which had appeared on initial UK and European pressings, was removed from the album around the time that "Rock 'n' Roll Damnation" was added. However, a 10-track LP including both songs does exist in (at least) the UK (catalog number K 50483 (SD19180), which is identical to the 9-track version), Germany (ATL 50 483), and Portugal (ATL 50483 SD 19180).) These versions contain the single version of "Rock 'n' Roll Damnation" and have a fade out for "Riff Raff" (UK Cassette Versions had the full version of "Riff Raff" up until the 1994 remasters).

== Personnel ==
- Bon Scott – vocals
- Angus Young – lead guitar
- Malcolm Young – rhythm guitar, backing vocals
- Cliff Williams – bass guitar, backing vocals
- Phil Rudd – drums

== Charts ==
Chart (1978)	Peak position
Australia (Kent Music Report)	83
Belgium (Ultratop 50 Flanders)	21
Netherlands (Single Top 100)	18
UK Singles (OCC)	24
