= Powerage =

1978 studio album by AC/DC

Studio album by AC/DC
- Released: 5 May 1978
- Recorded: September 1976 (Note: Track 9 (European)); February – March 1978 (Note: All tracks except track 9 (European))
- Studios: Albert (Sydney); Vineyard (London)
- Genres: Hard rock; blues rock; heavy metal
- Length: 39:47
- Labels: Albert; Atlantic
- Producers: Harry Vanda; George Young

AC/DC chronology
Let There Be Rock (1977)	Powerage (1978)	If You Want Blood You've Got It (1978)

Singles from Powerage
- 1. "Rock 'n' Roll Damnation" Released: 26 June 1978 (Aus)

Powerage is the fifth studio album by Australian hard rock band AC/DC, released on 5 May 1978 in the United Kingdom and 25 May 1978 in the United States, by Albert Productions and Atlantic Records. This was the band's first album to feature Cliff Williams on bass guitar, and it was also the first AC/DC album not to have a title track (aside from the Australia-only High Voltage album) and the first worldwide not to be released with a different album cover. Powerage was re-released in 2003 as part of the AC/DC Remasters series.

== Background ==
After a 12-date European tour opening for Black Sabbath in April, bassist Mark Evans was fired from AC/DC on 3 May 1977. In the AC/DC memoir AC/DC: Maximum Rock & Roll, former manager Michael Browning states, "I got a call one day from Malcolm and Angus. We were in London, I went to their apartment and they told me they wanted to get rid of Mark. Him and Angus didn't see eye to eye. They used to have a sort of tit-for-tat thing going, but nothing that I would have ever thought was going to be gig-threatening." According to Browning, the Young brothers were seriously considering Colin Pattenden of Manfred Mann's Earth Band fame. Browning feared that Pattenden was too old and didn't fit the band's image, so he instead pushed for Cliff Williams, who had previously played with Home and Bandit. Williams, who could also sing background vocals, passed the audition and was asked to join the band. In a 2011 interview with Joe Bosso that appears on MusicRadar, Evans reflected on his ousting from the group:

"With Angus and Malcolm, they were put on this earth to form AC/DC. They're committed big-time. And if they feel your commitment is anything less than theirs, well, that's a problem. Angus was intense. He was AC/DC 100 percent. His work ethic was unbelievable. When I was with him, he expected everybody to be just like him, which is pretty impossible... At the time, Malcolm said something about them wanting a bass player who could sing, but I think that was a smokescreen. I don't know if there was any one reason. It's just the way it went down. I felt the distance growing between me and Angus and Malcolm. When I was fired, it wasn't so much a surprise as it was a shock. There was a lot of tension in the band at the time. We'd just been kicked off a Black Sabbath tour, and this was right when a trip to the States was cancelled because the record company rejected the Dirty Deeds Done Dirt Cheap album. So it was a hard period."

The band finally toured America for the first time in the summer of 1977, focusing on smaller markets at first but eventually playing CBGB in New York City and the Whisky a Go Go in Los Angeles. In December, they played a set in front of a small audience at Atlantic Recording Studios in New York City which was broadcast live over Radio WIOQ in Philadelphia and hosted by Ed Sciaky. The promotional album, Live from the Atlantic Studios, was later released on the 1997 Bonfire box set. In early 1978, the band returned to Sydney to record their next album.

== Recording and composition ==
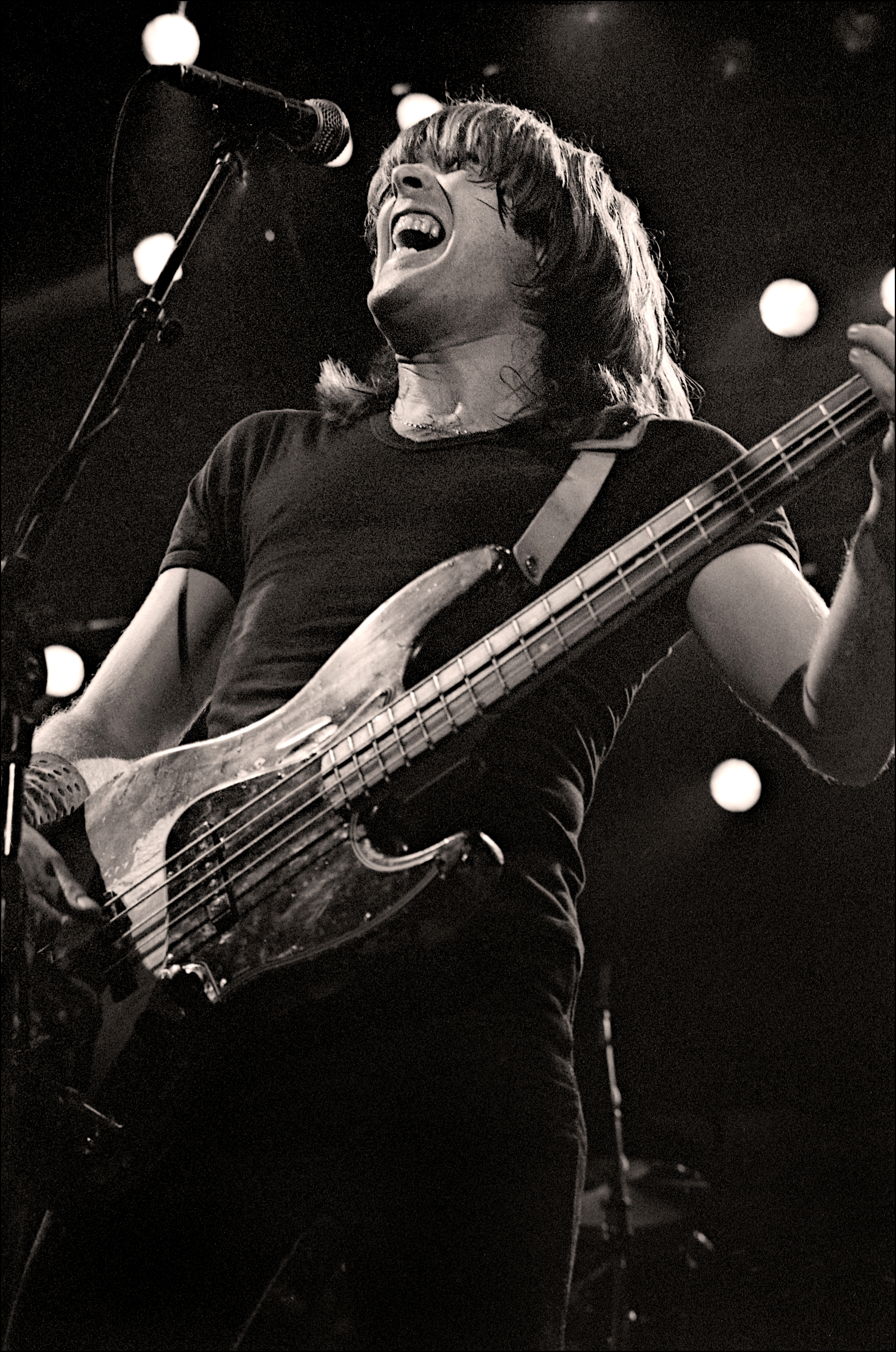
Powerage is the first AC/DC album to feature bassist Cliff Wiliams.

According to the Murray Engleheart book AC/DC: Maximum Rock & Roll, several songs that appeared on Powerage were started in July 1977 during the band's first rehearsals with Williams at Albert Studios, including "Kicked in the Teeth", "Up to My Neck in You", an early version of "Touch Too Much" (which later appeared on the follow-up album Highway to Hell), and possibly "Riff Raff". The Powerage sessions officially got going in January 1978 and stretched over a period of about eight weeks. Atlantic Records executives in the United States complained that the album did not contain a radio-friendly single, so with the first pressings of Powerage ready to go in the UK, the band complied and recorded "Rock 'n' Roll Damnation". The song, which features handclaps and maracas and does not have a traditional guitar solo, was released in Britain at the end of May and reached No. 24, the best performance yet by an AC/DC single. However, Powerage was ultimately the final Bon Scott-era studio album the band recorded with the team of Harry Vanda and George Young, who had produced all of the band's albums up to that point (George was the older brother of Angus and Malcolm; he and Vanda had enjoyed their own pop success with the Easybeats in the 1960s), the feeling from Atlantic being that a more commercial producer might do wonders for the band's profile in the lucrative American market.

Biographer Clinton Walker wrote in his 1994 Scott memoir Highway to Hell, "'Gimme a Bullet' was perhaps Bon's most accomplished piece of writing to date, in which his penchant for hardcase metaphors finds even more genuine pathos and humour than it had before." "What's Next to the Moon", with its allusions to Casey Jones and Clark Kent, as well as the elusive "Gone Shootin'" and the unapologetic "Down Payment Blues" ("I know I ain't doin' much, but doin' nothin' means a lot to me"), clearly show that Scott's writing, much like the band's sound, had evolved from the novelties of the group's early albums. "Bon was a street poet – he described it as 'toilet wall' poetry," former AC/DC manager Michael Browning explained to Peter Watts of Uncut in 2013. "That was unknown. They signed a singer and got a lyricist, as well." "Sin City", which the band performed frequently in concert, explores the seductive charms and dangers of Las Vegas, while "Kicked in the Teeth" addresses a two-faced woman with "two-faced lies". In an interview with Bass Frontiers, Cliff Williams recalls the sessions fondly: "The guys had already been in the studio for a while and we went in to do what turned out to be the Powerage album. Great work environment. Albert Studios there in Sydney was a great little rock and roll room... Great producers. Obviously a lot of chemistry there being brothers. Just a real fiery, energetic work environment. And we had about three weeks to do it, 'cause that's about all the money we had... It was really a tremendous experience."

== Releases ==
Many of AC/DC's early albums were altered for release in other markets, and this practice continued with Powerage, although it was the first LP to be released nearly simultaneously in both Australian and international markets and the first to use just one cover image for both.

== Reception ==
Professional ratings
Review scores
Source	Rating
AllMusic	3.5/5 stars
Classic Rock	4.5/5 stars
Collector's Guide to Heavy Metal	10/10
The Encyclopedia of Popular Music	3/5 stars
The Globe and Mail	D
Mojo	4/5 stars
MusicHound Rock	4.5/5 stars
The Rolling Stone Album Guide	2.5/5 stars
Spin Alternative Record Guide	3/10

While initial sales were somewhat disappointing, Powerage surpassed its predecessor, Let There Be Rock, by reaching No. 133 on Billboard's Pop Albums chart in the US, eventually achieving platinum certification. Eddie Van Halen and Keith Richards have stated that Powerage remains their favourite AC/DC record. The album is also Guns N' Roses' guitarist Slash and Aerosmith's guitarist Joe Perry's favourite album by the band, citing it as a major influence. The album has remained a favourite of Malcolm Young, who was quoted in AC/DC: Maximum Rock & Roll as saying, "I know a lot of people respect it. A lot of real rock and roll AC/DC fans, the real pure rock and roll guys. I think that's the most under-rated album of them all." It's also drummer Phil Rudd's favorite record the band did with Bon Scott.

Contemporary reviews were mixed. The Detroit Free Press called AC/DC "another late '70s boogie band making strides toward commercial clout [who] pumps out heavy metal with a reasonable amount of panache". The Cheshire Observer wrote that "the LP captures better than ever the fresh, aggressive style, the compelling high voltage rock". The Sydney Morning Herald determined that the band "were our first punk rockers, but thank heaven they are not our best or last... They have been emulated and surpassed by their students".

Modern reviews are equally polarized. AllMusic stated that while "it is the most uneven of" AC/DC's 1970s material, the album still contained a "few genuine classics", specifically mentioning "Down Payment Blues" and "Up to My Neck in You". Edwin Faust of Stylus Magazine considers Powerage "AC/DC's best album... because it isn't simply about sex, drinking and tongue-in-cheek Satanism", but shows a band "growing up". In 1994, Bon Scott biographer Clinton Walker opined in his book Highway to Hell that "altogether, Powerage just seemed to lack the uncompromising coherence and relentless body and soul that was its predecessor's greatness." Band biographer Jesse Fink cites the album as containing "their best ever collection of songs" and deems it "a high point creatively for the three Youngs, an album arguably superior to the commercially successful Mutt Lange circuitbreakers that followed, Highway to Hell and Back in Black."

In 2005, Powerage was ranked number 325 in Rock Hard magazine's book The 500 Greatest Rock & Metal Albums of All Time. Kerrang! magazine listed the album at No. 26 among the "100 Greatest Heavy Metal Albums of All Time".

== Track listing ==
=== Original European LP release ===
All tracks are written by Angus Young, Malcolm Young and Bon Scott.

Side one
No.	Title	Length
1.	"Rock 'n' Roll Damnation"	3:06
2.	"Gimme a Bullet"	3:20
3.	"Down Payment Blues"	5:40
4.	"Gone Shootin'"	5:22
5.	"Riff Raff"	5:14

Side two
No.	Title	Length
6.	"Sin City"	4:40
7.	"Up to My Neck in You"	4:12
8.	"What's Next to the Moon"	3:42
9.	"Cold Hearted Man"	3:32
10.	"Kicked in the Teeth"	3:58

Notes

- Initial editions of the European (UK) LP release featured a different mix of the album. It had a 'harder' sound than the later version, with small variations in vocals, guitar tracks, or both, and occasionally extra sections and longer or shorter fades. Some versions omitted "Rock 'n' Roll Damnation" from the track list, but all included "Cold Hearted Man", albeit in a different sequence than on subsequent pressings. For vinyl variations containing "Rock 'n' Roll Damnation", the single version was used, with "Riff Raff" having a fade-out to accommodate the extra time on Side A. The bluesy coda on "Down Payment Blues" is also excluded from this version. UK cassette versions had this mix, with the single version of "Rock 'n' Roll Damnation" and no fade on "Riff Raff", until the 1994 remasters.
- The album was later remixed for the American market, with the new mix replacing the original European mix, and becoming the global standard. This mix is still used on all AC/DC Powerage CD releases today.

=== Australian/US and all CD releases ===
All tracks are written by Angus Young, Malcolm Young and Bon Scott.

Side one
No.	Title	Length
1.	"Rock 'n' Roll Damnation"	3:37
2.	"Down Payment Blues"	6:04
3.	"Gimme a Bullet"	3:21
4.	"Riff Raff"	5:12

Side two
No.	Title	Length
5.	"Sin City"	4:45
6.	"What's Next to the Moon"	3:32
7.	"Gone Shootin'"	5:06
8.	"Up to My Neck in You"	4:13
9.	"Kicked in the Teeth"	3:54
Total length:		39:47

Notes

- Some cassette copies, such as the original Canadian issue, had an alternate track listing. For example, "Sin City" was the first song on side 1, while "Rock 'n' Roll Damnation" was the first song on side 2. All other tracks appear in the order of the original Australian/US release.

== Personnel ==
=== AC/DC ===
- Bon Scott – lead vocals
- Angus Young – lead guitar
- Malcolm Young – rhythm guitar, backing vocals
- Cliff Williams – bass guitar, backing vocals
- Phil Rudd – drums

=== Additional personnel ===
- Mark Evans – bass guitar (on "Cold Hearted Man")

Note

The Youngs: The Brothers Who Built AC/DC book claims that George Young played bass on all tracks, but Cliff Williams denied this in a 2020 interview.

=== Production ===
- Harry Vanda – producer
- George Young – producer
- Mark Opitz – engineer
- Bob Defrin – art direction
- Jim Houghton – photography

== Charts ==
Chart (1978)	Peak position
Australian Albums (Kent Music Report)	22
Dutch Albums (Album Top 100)	15
Swedish Albums (Sverigetopplistan)	19
UK Albums (Official Charts)	26
US Billboard 200	133

Chart (2024)	Peak position
German Albums (Offizielle Top 100)	26
Swiss Albums (Schweizer Hitparade)	32
UK Rock & Metal Albums (Official Charts)	9

== Certifications ==
Region	Certification	Certified units/sales
Australia (ARIA)	3× Platinum	210,000^{^}
Canada (Music Canada)	Gold	50,000^{‡}
France (SNEP)	Gold	100,000^{*}
Germany (BVMI)	Gold	250,000^{^}
Spain (Promusicae)	Gold	50,000^{^}
Switzerland (IFPI Switzerland)	Gold	25,000^{^}
United Kingdom (BPI)	Gold	100,000^{*}
United States (RIAA)	Platinum	1,000,000^{^}
^{*} Sales figures based on certification alone.^{^} Shipments figures based on certification alone.^{‡} Sales+streaming figures based on certification alone.
