= Dirty Deeds Done Dirt Cheap =

1976 studio album by AC/DC

- Original Australian cover

Studio album by AC/DC
- Released: 20 September 1976
- Recorded: July 1975 (Note: Track 4 (international)); December 1975 – March 1976 (Note: All tracks except tracks 2 and 4 (international)); September 1976 (Note: Track 2 (international))
- Studio: Albert (Sydney) (Note: All tracks except track 2 (international)): Vineyard (London)
- Genres: Hard rock; blues rock
- Length: 42:24 (Australia); 39:59 (international)
- Labels: Albert; Atlantic
- Producers: Harry Vanda; George Young

AC/DC chronology
High Voltage (1976)	Dirty Deeds Done Dirt Cheap (1976)	Let There Be Rock (1977)

Alternative cover art
- International cover, designed by Hipgnosis; Released 1976 (UK), 1981 (US)

Singles from Dirty Deeds Done Dirt Cheap
- 1. "Jailbreak" Released: 14 June 1976 (Aus); 2. "Dirty Deeds Done Dirt Cheap" Released: 5 October 1976 (Aus)

Dirty Deeds Done Dirt Cheap is the third studio album by Australian hard rock band AC/DC, originally released only in Europe, Australia and New Zealand in 1976. The album was not released in the United States until 1981, more than one year after lead singer Bon Scott's death. This was also AC/DC's first album in its entirety to be recorded with the same lineup, rather than including at least one track recorded with a different bassist or drummer.

== Background ==
AC/DC began recording Dirty Deeds Done Dirt Cheap in December 1975 at Albert Studios with Harry Vanda and George Young (elder brother of guitarists Malcolm and Angus) producing. In April 1976, the band went on their first tour of the UK, where "It's a Long Way to the Top (If You Wanna Rock 'n' Roll)" was released as a single. According to the book AC/DC: Maximum Rock & Roll, Vanda and Young travelled to the UK to record several songs with the band at Vineland Studios for a scheduled EP, which was eventually scrapped. "Carry Me Home" later appeared in 1977 as a B-side to "Dog Eat Dog", while "Dirty Eyes" remained unreleased and was later reworked into "Whole Lotta Rosie" for 1977's Let There Be Rock. Only "Love at First Feel" was used for Dirty Deeds, but not for the Australian release. A song titled "I'm a Rebel" was recorded at Maschener Studios as well, with music and lyrics written by another elder Young brother, Alex Young. This song was never released by AC/DC, and remains in Albert Productions' vaults. German band Accept later released it as a single, and named their second album after it. High Voltage was released in the US in 1976. However, hampered by visa problems and a lack of interest from Atlantic Records in the US, the band returned to Australia to finish their third album.

Cover art for the Australian version was assembled by Richard Ford at EMI Studios, Sydney, Australia.

Also according to AC/DC: Maximum Rock & Roll, years later, Stephen King convinced the band to do the soundtrack for his film Maximum Overdrive (the soundtrack released as Who Made Who) by putting "Ain't No Fun" on the record player and singing along to the entire song line-for-line in order to prove how much of a fan he was of their music.

The motel featured on the cover of the international release of the album was the Imperial 400 Motel, located at 6826 Sunset Boulevard, Los Angeles, until it was closed down in 1982 and subsequently fell under an assortment of ownerships.

== Composition ==
The title track would become one of the band's most famous songs. Its narrator invites people experiencing problems to either call him on 36-24-36, an actual phone number in Australia in the 1960s (then properly formatted as FM 2436 – 36 translated to FM on the rotary dial or keypad), or visit him at his home, at which point he will perform assorted unsavoury acts to resolve said problems. Situations in which he offers assistance include those involving lewd high school headmasters, and significant others who either are adulterous or persistently find fault with their partners. The term "Dirty Deeds Done Dirt Cheap" is an homage to the cartoon Beany and Cecil, which Angus watched when he was a child. One of the cartoon's characters was named Dishonest John, and carried a business card that read, "Dirty deeds done dirt cheap. Special rates for Sundays and holidays." On the Live on Donington DVD, Malcolm and Angus explained that the concept of the album was to base it as a Bogartian mystery scenario. This was also backed by author Dave Rubin, who stated in his book Inside Rock Guitar: Four Decades of the Greatest Electric Rock Guitarists that Bogart's movies served as the basis for the album.

In 1981, after the album was released in the U.S., Norman and Marilyn White of Libertyville, Illinois filed a $250,000 lawsuit ($873,683 in 2025) in Lake County, Illinois Circuit Court against Atlantic Records and its distributors because, they alleged, their telephone number was included in the song, resulting in hundreds of prank phone calls. Their attorney told the Chicago Tribune that the song's 36-24-36 digits were followed by what to his clients sounded like an "8", thus creating the couple's phone number.

Another fan favorite from the album is "Ride On". Atypically for an AC/DC song, it has a sad, slow blues feel and features Bon Scott's reflective lyrics and restrained, soulful delivery. The lyrics concern a man remembering the mistakes he has made in a relationship while drinking. It has frequently been cited as one of AC/DC's best songs. The track is also significant for Angus Young's guitar solo. AC/DC biographer Murray Engleheart observes in his 2006 band memoir: "Overall, Dirty Deeds Done Dirt Cheap was rougher than T.N.T. and highlighted the difficulties of recording between increasingly demanding touring commitments. Songs like 'Ain't No Fun,' 'RIP,' 'Jailbreak,' and particularly the lonely resignation of 'Ride On,' were almost character studies of Bon and had a sense of impatience... breaking free and just plain loneliness." "Ride On" was covered by the French band Trust on their self-titled 1979 debut album, after they supported AC/DC live in Paris in the autumn of 1978. Scott jammed the song with Trust at Scorpio Sound Studios in London on 13 February 1980, six days before his death in that city. A recording of this later surfaced on the bootleg Bon Scott Forever Volume 1. In an interview with Anthony O'Grady of RAM in August 1976, Scott stated that "Ride On" was "about a guy who gets pissed around by chicks... can't find what he wants." In the same 1976 RAM interview, Scott revealed that "Squealer" was about a sexual encounter with a virgin. In concert, Scott would often introduce "Problem Child" as being about Angus. "Ain't No Fun (Waiting 'Round to be a Millionaire)" is one of the few AC/DC songs that has cursing, with Scott shouting on the fade, "Hey Howard, how ya doin' friend, my next door neighbour? Oh yeah, get your fuckin' jumbo jet off my airport!" The rhythm of "There's Gonna Be Some Rockin'" is very similar to that of "The Seventh Son" by Willie Dixon.

Record World said of "Problem Child" that the group "rocks hard, but with a sure melodic touch and satisfyingly raunchy guitar work."

== International releases ==
A modified international edition was released on Atlantic on 17 December 1976, although the label was unhappy with its vocals and production. (According to bassist Mark Evans, band manager Michael Browning told him he assumed Bon Scott would be fired as a result.) The band even teetered on the brink of being dropped. "The Atlantic A&R department [in the US] said, 'We're sorry, but this album actually doesn't make it,'" recalled Phil Carson, who had signed the band. "'We're not gonna put it out and we're dropping the band'… So I went to [Atlantic executive] Nesuhi (Ertegun) and showed him the sales figures that we'd got for High Voltage. They were not awe-inspiring but, considering we'd only paid $25,000 ($139,574 in 2025) for the album, this was not so bad… Nesuhi backed me up and I re-signed the band at that point. I managed to claw it back in. Thank God."

As biographer Murray Engleheart observes in his book AC/DC: Maximum Rock & Roll, the band had not even toured the States yet, a market the band longed to conquer:

The tough rock acts only got what little airwave attention they did because they'd built up a fanbase through years on the road. AC/DC hadn't had the opportunity to marshal troops through touring the U.S., and at the time there was no way something as raw and gritty as Dirty Deeds was going to make it onto American radio playlists by itself. It was a brutally simple catch-22 ... Americans were said to have trouble understanding Bon, and if the people working with the band couldn't make out the lyrics, how was his voice going to work on the all-important U.S. radio networks?

Following the American success of Highway to Hell in late 1979, copies of the album began to appear as imports in the US. Some of these were the original Australian edition on Albert Productions; however, Atlantic also pressed the international version in Australia, and many of these were also exported to the US. Strong demand for both versions (in the wake of the huge success of Back in Black) led the US division of Atlantic to finally authorize an official US release in March 1981. It went straight to No. 3 on the Billboard album charts.

However, the release was also poorly timed, considering that AC/DC had successfully reinvented itself with a new singer, Brian Johnson. The band was working on a new album, which would ultimately become For Those About to Rock We Salute You, released later that same year; the US release of Dirty Deeds was widely seen as damaging the momentum for that album, which it outsold. The band was forced to add songs from Dirty Deeds to its setlist on its subsequent tour, also taking the focus away from their new album.

In the book The Youngs: The Brothers Who Built AC/DC, author Jesse Fink quotes Phil Carson as saying that the release of Dirty Deeds was "one of the most crass decisions ever made by a record-company executive", blaming A&R man Doug Morris and his New York City cohorts:

At the time, Doug's argument was purely financial. Back in Black had already sold over five million copies. Because of those numbers, Doug told me Dirty Deeds would sell at least 2 million. I told him he was right about that, but that it would also create a new sales plateau for AC/DC ... God knows how many albums For Those About to Rock would have sold had Doug waited for that to come out.

The international release had significant variations from the original album. "Jailbreak" (which had preceded the LP's release in Australia and the UK) and "R.I.P. (Rock in Peace)" were jettisoned in favor of "Rocker" (from the 1975 Australian album T.N.T.) and "Love at First Feel". "Jailbreak" did not see a release in the United States, Canada, and Japan until October 1984 as part of the international '74 Jailbreak EP. A promo-only single, with "Show Business" as its B-side, was released to radio stations in the US at the time. "Love at First Feel" is one of only two tracks from international AC/DC albums not to be available on the band's Australian albums (the other is "Cold Hearted Man", released on European pressings of Powerage); however, "Love at First Feel" was released in Australia as a single in January 1977, with "Problem Child" as its B-side, which peaked in the Kent Music Report Singles Chart Top 100. The international release of Dirty Deeds also contains "Big Balls", one of the band's most infamous compositions, that finds Scott, a deceptively clever lyricist, using double entendres by using ballroom and costume parties to obviously reference his own testicles. AC/DC had mined this territory before on "The Jack" and would again later on songs like "Given the Dog a Bone", but "Big Balls" could be their funniest attempt at sexual innuendo, although the song was controversial in its day and drew the ire of some critics who mistook the band's sense of humor for crude perversity. Dirty Deeds Done Dirt Cheap also led to more AC/DC appearances on Australia's Countdown music programme, following those in support of High Voltage and T.N.T. These appearances included a live performance of the album's title track, as well as a music video for "Jailbreak".

Two songs on the international album were edited from the full-length versions on the original Australian album. The full-length "Dirty Deeds Done Dirt Cheap" has the title of the song chanted four times, starting at 3:09, but on the edited version the chant is heard only twice. "Ain't No Fun (Waiting Round to Be a Millionaire)" lasted 7:29 on the Australian album but was faded out early to 6:57 on the international version. This means they trim off the Chuck Berry licks and title chanting to the end; however, both these full-length versions were restored on the 1994 Atco Records remastered CD of the international album. The most recent 2003 CD edition by Epic Records goes back to the edited versions, as originally on the 1976 and 1981 international vinyl editions. The uncut versions of both songs were released on the 2009 box set Backtracks. On the original version of "Rocker", included on the Australian T.N.T. album, the song lasts 2:55 and cuts out abruptly as the guitar riff hits its peak. Conversely, all international editions of the Dirty Deeds Done Dirt Cheap album have a slightly shorter version where the song fades out at 2:50 before the cut. "Squealer" appears to be longer by thirteen seconds on the international version; this is due to it having a bumper of silence at the end, as it is the final track on the record. "Ride On" has a four-second difference (longer on the international version) which appears to be from a minor speed issue, although the last guitar slide can be heard better on the shorter Australian version.

== Reception ==
Professional ratings
Review scores
Source	Rating
AllMusic	5/5 stars
Blender	3/5 stars
Christgau's Record Guide	C+
Classic Rock	4.5/5 stars
Collector's Guide to Heavy Metal	8/10
The Encyclopedia of Popular Music	3/5 stars
Rolling Stone	3/5 stars
Spin Alternative Record Guide	6/10

Dirty Deeds Done Dirt Cheap has been certified 6× platinum both in Australia and in the US, selling at least six million copies, becoming the third-highest-selling album by AC/DC in the US after Highway to Hell (7× platinum) and Back in Black (25× platinum). AllMusic stated that "it captured the seething malevolence of Bon Scott... encouraged by the maniacal riffs of Angus and Malcolm Young" and that there was a "real sense of danger to this record." Greg Kot of Rolling Stone commented: "the guitars of brothers Angus and Malcolm Young bark at each other, Phil Rudd swings the beat even as he's pulverizing his kick drum, and Scott brings the raunch 'n' wail. The subject matter is standard-issue rock rebellion; Scott pauses only once to briefly contemplate the consequences of his night stalking in 'Ride On'."

== Track listing ==
=== Australian version ===
All tracks are written by Angus Young, Malcolm Young, and Bon Scott.

Side one
No.	Title	Length
1.	"Dirty Deeds Done Dirt Cheap"	4:12
2.	"Ain't No Fun (Waiting 'Round to Be a Millionaire)"	7:31
3.	"There's Gonna Be Some Rockin'"	3:18
4.	"Problem Child"	5:47

Side two
No.	Title	Length
5.	"Squealer"	5:15
6.	"Big Balls"	2:38
7.	"R.I.P. (Rock in Peace)"	3:35
8.	"Ride On"	5:54
9.	"Jailbreak"	4:41
Total length:		42:24

=== International version ===
All tracks are written by Angus Young, Malcolm Young, and Bon Scott.

Side one
No.	Title	Length
1.	"Dirty Deeds Done Dirt Cheap"	3:52
2.	"Love at First Feel"	3:13
3.	"Big Balls"	2:38
4.	"Rocker"	2:52
5.	"Problem Child"	5:47

Side two
No.	Title	Length
6.	"There's Gonna Be Some Rockin'"	3:18
7.	"Ain't No Fun (Waiting 'Round to Be a Millionaire)"	6:58
8.	"Ride On"	5:54
9.	"Squealer"	5:15
Total length:		39:59

Notes

- "Dirty Deeds Done Dirt Cheap" was shortened from its original length on the Australian version of the album for the international release.
- "Love at First Feel" was a new track not previously available in Australia. It was later released there as a single.
- "Big Balls" faded out on the original international LP release.
- "Rocker" originally appeared on the Australian T.N.T. in a slightly longer version without the fade-out.
- "Problem Child" was included on the international release in its original Australian form, whereas the international version of Let There Be Rock contained a shortened version of the song without the extended ending.
- "Ain't No Fun (Waiting Round to Be a Millionaire)" was also shortened from its original length on the Australian version of the album for the international release.

The 1994 remastered international Atco CD release of the album included the full-length Australian versions of "Dirty Deeds Done Dirt Cheap", "Big Balls", "Rocker", and "Ain't No Fun (Waiting Round to Be a Millionaire)". They were later reverted to the shortened versions for the 2003 Epic remastered versions of the album with "Big Balls" remaining in its longer version. The 2009 boxed set Backtracks Deluxe Edition featured the full-length original Australian versions of "Dirty Deeds Done Dirt Cheap" and "Ain't No Fun (Waiting Round to Be a Millionaire)", but not "Rocker", which is nevertheless billed as the original Australian version. This was later fixed on the 2012 iTunes release.

== Personnel ==
AC/DC

- Bon Scott – lead vocals
- Angus Young – lead guitar
- Malcolm Young – rhythm guitar, backing vocals
- Mark Evans – bass guitar
- Phil Rudd – drums

Production

- George Young – production, bass guitar on track 3
- Harry Vanda – production
- Kettle Art Productions – cover concept & design (Australia)
- Hipgnosis – sleeve design & photos (International)

== Charts ==
=== Weekly charts ===
Chart (1976–1978)	Peak position
Australian Albums (Kent Music Report)	5
Swedish Albums (Sverigetopplistan)	50

Chart (1981)	Peak position
New Zealand Albums (RMNZ)	20
US Billboard 200	3

Chart (2008)	Peak position
Australian Albums (ARIA)	28

Chart (2024)	Peak position
German Albums (Offizielle Top 100)	19
Greek Albums (IFPI)	12
Swiss Albums (Schweizer Hitparade)	25
UK Rock & Metal Albums (Official Charts)	13

=== Year-end charts ===
Year-end chart performance for Dirt Deeds Done Dirt Cheap
Chart (2002)	Position
Canadian Metal Albums (Nielsen SoundScan)	90

== Certifications ==
Region	Certification	Certified units/sales
Australia (ARIA) Australian release	6× Platinum	420,000^{^}
Canada (Music Canada)	2× Platinum	200,000^{‡}
Germany (BVMI)	Platinum	500,000^{^}
New Zealand (RMNZ)	Gold	7,500^{‡}
Spain (Promusicae)	Gold	50,000^{^}
Switzerland (IFPI Switzerland)	Gold	25,000^{^}
United Kingdom (BPI)	Gold	100,000^{*}
United States (RIAA)	7× Platinum	7,000,000^{‡}
Yugoslavia	—	69,562
^{*} Sales figures based on certification alone.^{^} Shipments figures based on certification alone.^{‡} Sales+streaming figures based on certification alone.
