= Dog Eat Dog (AC/DC song) =

1977 single by AC/DC

Single by AC/DC

from the album Let There Be Rock
- B-side: "Carry Me Home"
- Released: 21 March 1977
- Recorded: 1977
- Studio: Albert (Sydney)
- Genre: Hard rock
- Length: 3:37
- Label: Albert
- Songwriters: Angus Young; Malcolm Young; Bon Scott
- Producers: Harry Vanda; George Young

AC/DC singles chronology
"Love at First Feel" (1977)	"Dog Eat Dog" (1977)	"Let There Be Rock" (1977)

Music video
- "Dog Eat Dog" (from Plug Me In) on YouTube

"Dog Eat Dog" is a song by Australian hard rock band AC/DC. It is the second track of their album Let There Be Rock, released in 1977, and was written by Angus Young, Malcolm Young, and Bon Scott.

It was released as a single in Australia, and included the non-album track "Carry Me Home" on the B-side, which was later released on Backtracks.

AC/DC played "Dog Eat Dog" on their Black Ice World Tour until early 2010 when they dropped it from the set list and added "High Voltage".

The song's lyrics were inspired by the band's anger towards Atlantic Records.

== Personnel ==
- Bon Scott – lead vocals
- Angus Young – lead guitar
- Malcolm Young – rhythm guitar, backing vocals
- Mark Evans – bass guitar
- Phil Rudd – drums

== Production ==
- Producers: Harry Vanda, George Young

== Charts ==
Chart (1977)	Peak position
Australian (Kent Music Report)	60
