= Let There Be Rock =

1977 studio album by AC/DC

- International cover

Studio album by AC/DC
- Released: 21 March 1977 (Note: It was released on 21 March 1977 in Australasia, and was released internationally on 25 July 1977.)
- Recorded: December 1975–March 1976 (Note: Track 5 (international)); January–February 1977 (Note: All tracks except track 5 (international))
- Studio: Albert (Sydney)
- Genres: Hard rock; blues rock
- Length: 40:06 (Australia); 41:01 (international)
- Labels: Albert (Australia); Atlantic (UK & Europe); ATCO (US)
- Producers: Harry Vanda; George Young

AC/DC chronology
Dirty Deeds Done Dirt Cheap (1976)	Let There Be Rock (1977)	Powerage (1978)

Alternative cover art
- Original Australian cover

Singles from Let There Be Rock
- 1. "Dog Eat Dog" Released: 21 March 1977 (Aus); 2. "Whole Lotta Rosie" Released: 20 May 1977 (NL) (Note: Dutch Top 40 magazine); 3. "Let There Be Rock" / "Problem Child" Released: 30 September 1977 (UK) (Note: A and B-side reversed in the United States)

Let There Be Rock is the fourth studio album by Australian rock band AC/DC. It was originally released on 21 March 1977 in Australasia, through Albert Productions label. A modified international edition was released on 25 July 1977, through Atlantic Records. It was the last AC/DC album to feature Mark Evans on bass.

== Background ==
In late 1976 AC/DC were in a slump. "It was very close to being all over", manager Michael Browning said. "Things were progressing very well in London and Europe. We'd been through a whole thing with the Marquee where they broke all the house records. We'd done the 'Lock Up Your Daughters' UK tour and the Reading Festival. It was all shaping up really well." "In the middle of the tour, I get a phone call saying Atlantic Records in America didn't like the Dirty Deeds album", said Browning. "That, in fact, they were going to drop the group from the label. And that's when things got really bad."

"There was always a siege mentality about that band. But once we all found out that Atlantic had knocked us back the attitude was: 'Fuck them! Who the fuck do they think they are?' So from that point onwards it was: 'Fuck, we'll show them!' We were seriously fucking pissed off about it. It didn't need to be discussed. We were going to go in and make that album and shove it up their arse!"

— Mark Evans

Angus Young said, "Our brother George asked us what kind of album we wanted to make and we said it would be great if we could just make a lot of guitar riffs, because we were all fired up after doing all this touring."

== Artwork ==
The Australian cover features the fingers of guitarist Chris Turner of the Australian band Buffalo. "There was a bloke called Colin Stead, who was in Buffalo for about ten minutes," Turner recalled. "He was also the centrefold photographer for Playboy. He phoned me up and said he was doing the album cover for Let There Be Rock, but AC/DC were out of town, so could I help out? He wanted a flash guitar run up and down the neck. Apparently, when he saw it, Angus said, 'He's got fat fingers, hasn't he?'"

The cover of the international version, released in July 1977, marked the first appearance of the band's now iconic logo, designed by Gerard Huerta. The photograph used for the international cover was taken at a concert on 19 March 1977 at the Kursaal Ballroom, Southend, Essex, UK, by rock photographer Keith Morris.

== Reception ==
Professional ratings
Review scores
Source	Rating
AllMusic	4.5/5 stars
Classic Rock	4.5/5 stars
Collector's Guide to Heavy Metal	10/10
The Encyclopedia of Popular Music	4/5 stars
MusicHound Rock	4/5 stars
The Rolling Stone Album Guide	2.5/5 stars
Spin Alternative Record Guide	5/10

Reception to Let There Be Rock was extremely positive; according to AllMusic AC/DC played "sweaty, dirty, nasty rock" and the band had "rarely done that kind of rock better than they did" on Let There Be Rock. In 2001, Q magazine named Let There Be Rock as one of the 50 Heaviest Albums of All Time. Cashbox said "Heavy metal is their special forte and there is plenty of voltage displayed on this electrified disc." Julian Marszalek of The Quietus described the album as "a stepping stone from the glam rock and toilet wall poetry of its predecessors to the gelling and building of their sound" achieved on their masterpiece Powerage, concluding that Let There Be Rock contains "perfect music for adolescents with rampant hormones and for those who view arrested development as a lifestyle option rather than an affliction."

Eduardo Rivadavia of AllMusic enthuses, ""Let There Be Rock" sees AC/DC's religious-like respect for the simple art of making rock & roll brought to its logical conclusion: a veritable gospel to the glory of rock, canonized here in hymn-like worship. The near-epic title track to what is widely regarded as the best Bon Scott-era album, the song is a holy testimony, bringing good news to all those who believe in the healing power of rock & roll -- amen! Oh yeah, it also kicks unholy ass!" David Fricke of Rolling Stone wrote of the album in a 2008 cover story, "AC/DC's early albums were perfectly frenetic, but inconsistent. Their second U.S. LP was almost all killer. Scott sings 'Bad Boy Boogie' and 'Problem Child' like he's the enfant terrible...Angus' solos are true white heat." In 2006, AC/DC biographer Murray Engleheart wrote that Let There Be Rock "elevated AC/DC to the status of an album band, something that had previously been the exclusive domain of the likes of The Rolling Stones, The Who and Led Zeppelin." In 2000, Angus Young recalled to Guitar World that producer Mutt Lange once told him "of all the many albums we'd done with my brother George and his partner, Harry Vanda, the one Mutt wished he would have done, where he was envious of George, was Let There Be Rock." Band biographer Jesse Fink writes, "Wherever AC/DC ended up in the annals of rock history, this album would stand for all time as an expression of their unrivaled might as a guitar band."

== Track listing ==
=== Australian version ===
All tracks are written by Angus Young, Malcolm Young and Bon Scott.

Side one
No.	Title	Length
1.	"Go Down"	5:17
2.	"Dog Eat Dog"	3:35
3.	"Let There Be Rock"	6:06
4.	"Bad Boy Boogie"	4:27

Side two
No.	Title	Length
5.	"Overdose"	6:09
6.	"Crabsody in Blue"	4:44
7.	"Hell Ain't a Bad Place to Be"	4:14
8.	"Whole Lotta Rosie"	5:24
Total length:		40:06

=== International version ===
Side one
No.	Title	Length
1.	"Go Down"	5:31
2.	"Dog Eat Dog"	3:35
3.	"Let There Be Rock"	6:06
4.	"Bad Boy Boogie"	4:27

Side two
No.	Title	Length
5.	"Problem Child"	5:25
6.	"Overdose"	6:09
7.	"Hell Ain't a Bad Place to Be"	4:14
8.	"Whole Lotta Rosie"	5:24
Total length:		41:01

Notes

- For the original Australian vinyl release a different version of "Go Down" was used. This version has an early fade-out, changing the length of the song to only 5:17.
- Track 5, "Problem Child", was originally released on Dirty Deeds Done Dirt Cheap in 1976. This is a shortened version of the original, missing the reprise coda.
- For the original vinyl release, in all markets other than the US, Canada, South Africa and Japan, "Crabsody in Blue" was featured instead of "Problem Child".

== Personnel ==
AC/DC

- Bon Scott – lead vocals
- Angus Young – lead guitar
- Malcolm Young – rhythm guitar, backing vocals
- Mark Evans – bass guitar
- Phil Rudd – drums, percussion

Production

- Harry Vanda – producer
- George Young – producer
- Mark Opitz – engineer
- Michael Fraser – mastering supervisor
- Al Quaglieri – mastering supervisor
- George Marino – mastering
- Eugene Nastasi – digital assembly
- Bob Defrin – art direction
- Richard Ford – artwork
- Gerard Huerta – cover lettering
- Murray Engleheart – liner notes

== Charts ==
Chart (1977–1981)	Peak position
Australian Albums (Kent Music Report)	19
Dutch Albums (Album Top 100)	10
New Zealand Albums (RMNZ)	42
Swedish Albums (Sverigetopplistan)	29
UK Albums (Official Charts)	17
US Billboard 200	154

Chart (2003)	Peak position
Norwegian Albums (VG-lista)	37

Chart (2024)	Peak position
German Albums (Offizielle Top 100)	40
Scottish Albums (Official Charts)	40
Swiss Albums (Schweizer Hitparade)	17

== Certifications ==
Region	Certification	Certified units/sales
Australia (ARIA)	5× Platinum	350,000^{^}
Canada (Music Canada)	Gold	50,000^{‡}
France (SNEP)	Gold	100,000^{*}
Germany (BVMI)	Platinum	500,000^{^}
Spain (Promusicae)	Gold	50,000^{^}
United Kingdom (BPI)	Gold	100,000^{*}
United States (RIAA)	2× Platinum	2,000,000^{^}
^{*} Sales figures based on certification alone.^{^} Shipments figures based on certification alone.^{‡} Sales+streaming figures based on certification alone.
