= List of AC/DC members =

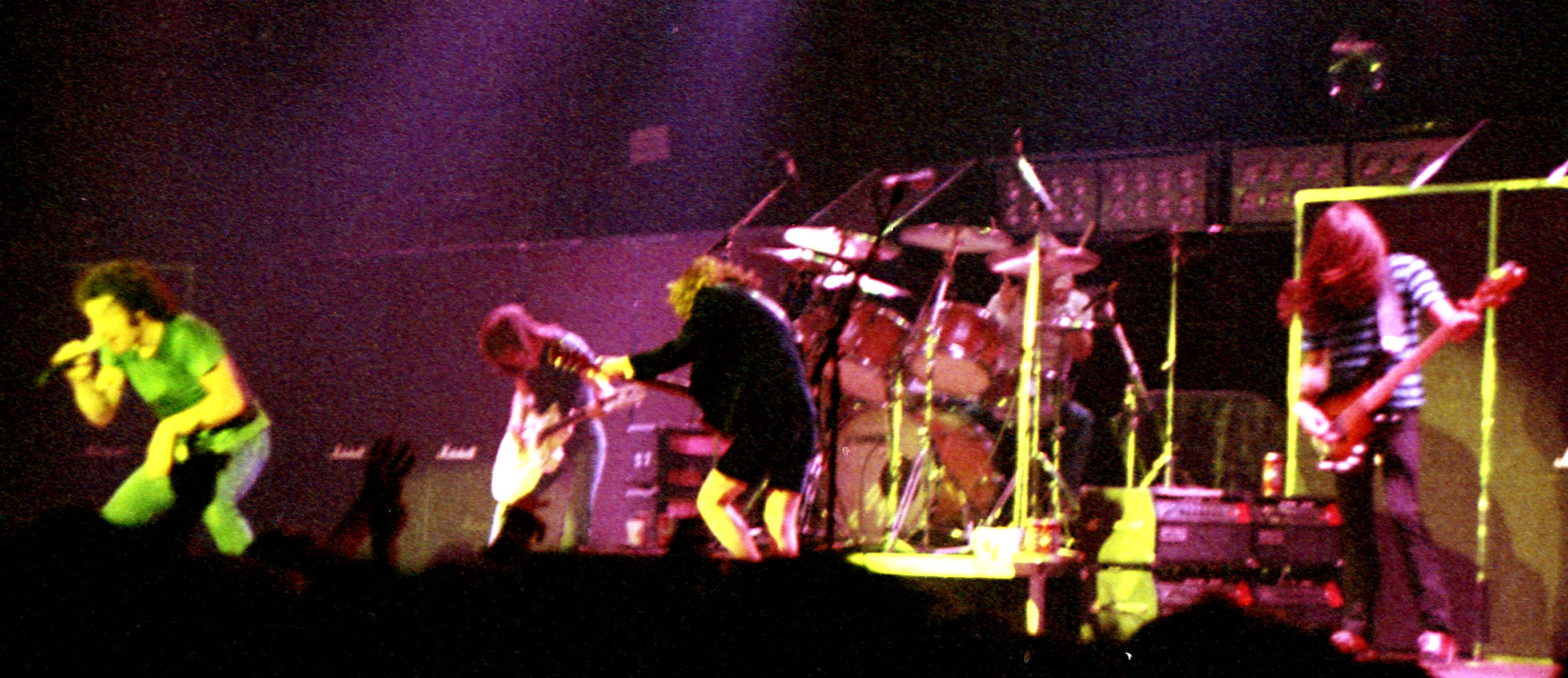
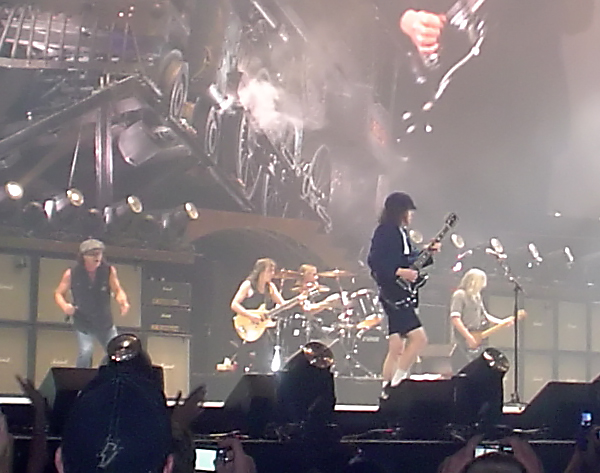
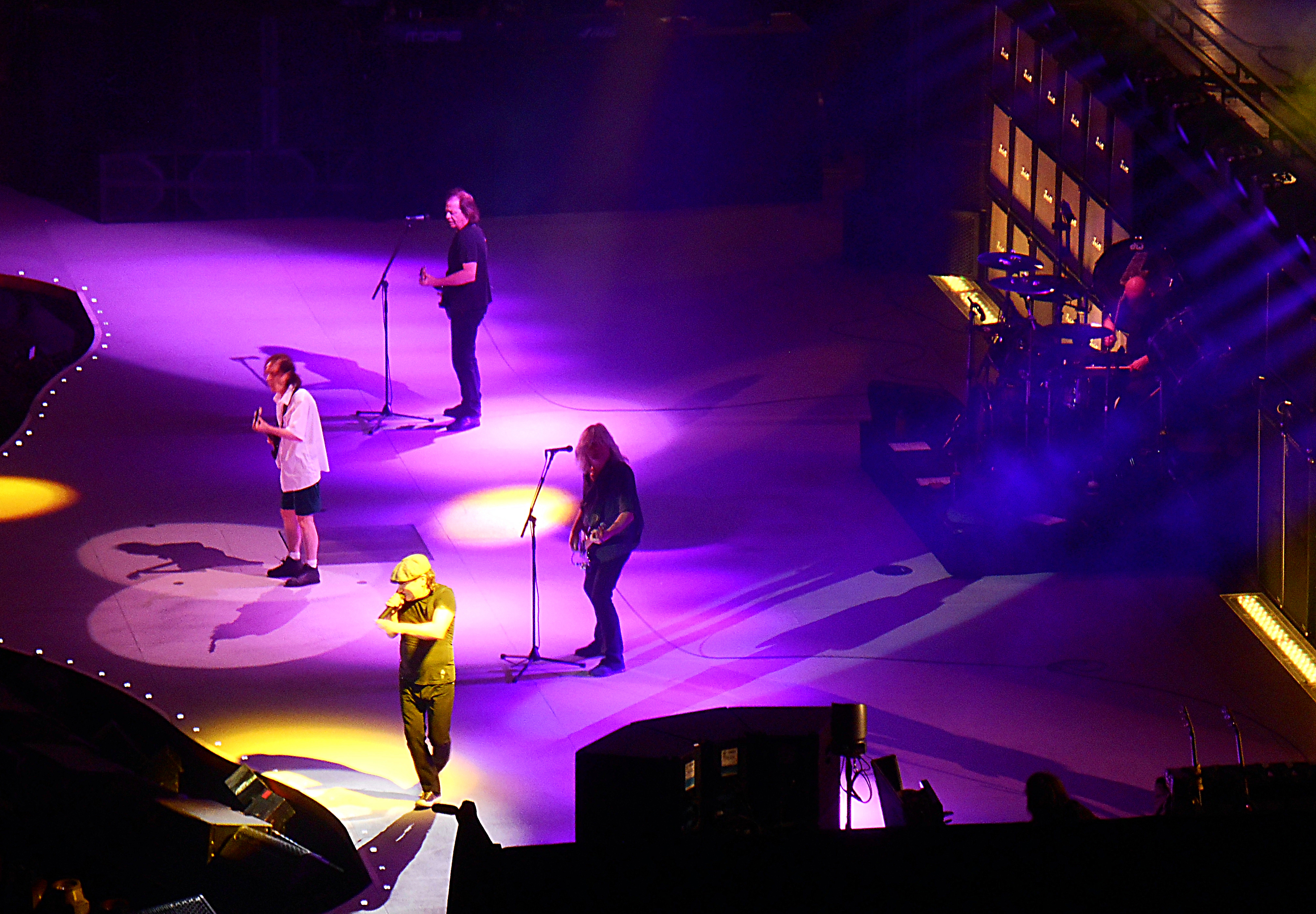
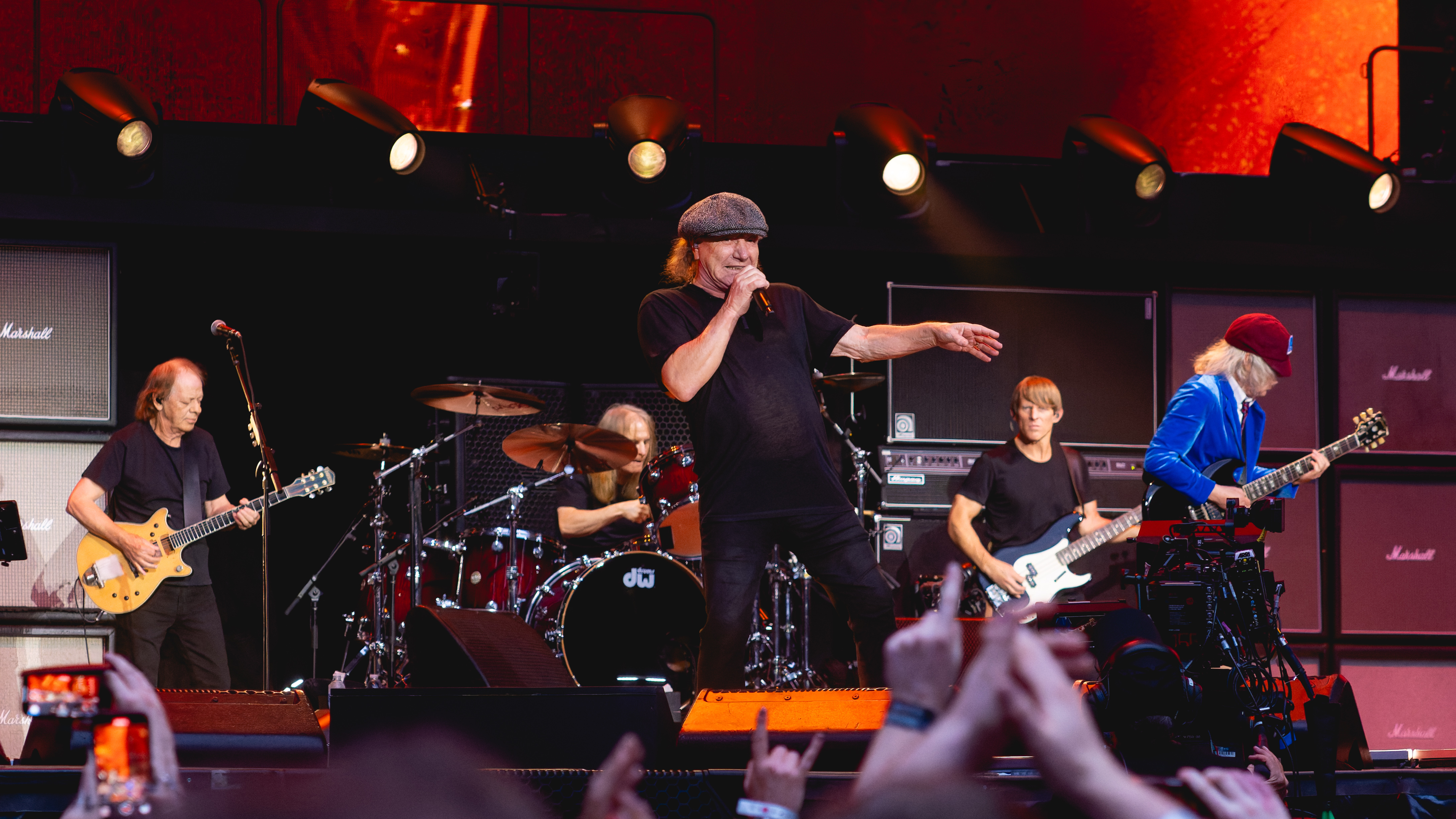
Members of AC/DC performing live in 1980, 2009, 2016, and 2024.

AC/DC are an Australian rock band from Sydney. Formed in November 1973, the group originally consisted of vocalist Dave Evans, lead guitarist Angus Young, rhythm guitarist Malcolm Young (his older brother), bassist Larry Van Kriedt and drummer Colin Burgess. The band's current touring lineup features Angus Young, vocalist Brian Johnson (from 1980 to 2016, and since 2018), rhythm guitarist Stevie Young (nephew of Angus and Malcolm Young, a member since 2014), as well as touring musicians Matt Laug (drums) and Chris Chaney (bass guitar).

== History ==
AC/DC formed in November 1973 by brothers Malcolm and Angus Young, with drummer Colin Burgess (ex-the Masters Apprentices), bass guitarist Larry Van Kriedt and vocalist Dave Evans. The group recorded single "Can I Sit Next to You, Girl" in January–February 1974 at EMI Studios in Sydney, with older brother George Young and Harry Vanda as the producers – both were former members of the Easybeats and Marcus Hook Roll Band. A week after this session Burgess was fired, followed shortly thereafter by Van Kriedt, his recorded bass lines for the January session being re-recorded by George. Their replacements, Neil Smith on bass and Noel Taylor on drums, lasted six weeks, replaced in turn by Rob Bailey and Peter Clack, respectively.

In September 1974, Bon Scott, a vocalist previously with the Valentines (1966–1970) and Fraternity (1971–1973), joined AC/DC after his former bandmate Vince Lovegrove introduced him to George during their stopover in Adelaide. Scott had worked as a driver for the group in that city until an audition promoted him to lead singer. Scott also had experience as a songwriter and drummer. Both Bailey and Clack were fired in January 1975, with Paul Matters taking over bass duties briefly before being fired in turn and replaced temporarily by George or Malcolm for live duties. Meanwhile, on drums, Ron Carpenter and Russell Coleman had brief tenures before Phil Rudd (ex-Buster Brown) joined in that month. Bassist Mark Evans was enlisted in March 1975, setting the line-up, which lasted two years. In mid-1977, Mark Evans was fired – he ascribed disagreements with Angus and Malcolm as a contributing factor. He was replaced on bass guitar by Cliff Williams, (ex-Home and Bandit).

In February 1980, after the release of Highway to Hell (1979), Scott died to acute alcohol poisoning. The band briefly considered quitting, but encouraged by the insistence from Scott's parents that he would have wanted them to carry on, they decided to continue and sought a new vocalist, to which vocalist Brian Johnson (ex-Geordie) was officially announced as the lead singer of AC/DC on 1 April 1980. In April 1983, following an altercation with Malcolm Young and ongoing problems with substance abuse, Rudd was fired from AC/DC. In April 1988, following the Blow Up Your Video World Tour shows across Europe, Malcolm announced that he was taking time off touring, principally to deal with his alcoholism. Angus and Malcolm's nephew, Stevie Young, temporarily replaced Malcolm on guitar. In 1989, Wright left the group to work on American heavy metal band Dio's fifth studio album Lock Up the Wolves (1990); he was replaced by session veteran Chris Slade. Angus and Malcolm invited Rudd to several jam sessions during 1994; he was rehired to replace Slade.

On 23 September 2014, AC/DC members confirmed that Malcolm had officially retired from performing, due to his early onset dementia. He died on 18 November 2017 aged 64, due to the dementia. On 6 November 2014, Rudd was charged with threatening to kill, possession of methamphetamine and possession of cannabis, following a police raid on his home. AC/DC's remaining members issued a statement clarifying that Rock or Bust World Tour would continue, but did not indicated whether or not Rudd would participate, or whether he was still a member. At a charity signing before the Grammy Awards, the band were photographed together with Slade. It was later confirmed that he had rejoined for the Grammys and upcoming tour. Shortly thereafter, the band's web site removed Rudd as their drummer and replaced him with Slade.

On 7 March 2016, the band announced that the final ten dates of the second North American leg of the tour would be rescheduled as Johnson's doctors had ordered him to stop touring immediately: he risked complete deafness if he persisted. The ten cancelled dates were to be rescheduled, "likely with a guest vocalist" later in the year, leaving Johnson's future in touring with the group uncertain. On 16 April 2016, Guns N' Roses front man Axl Rose was announced as said guest vocalist for the remainder of their 2016 tour dates. Williams indicated he was leaving AC/DC during an interview with Gulfshore Life's Jonathan Foerste on 8 July 2016, "It's been what I've known for the past 40 years, but after this tour I'm backing off of touring and recording. Losing Malcolm, the thing with [Rudd] and now with [Johnson], it's a changed animal. I feel in my gut it's the right thing." At the end of the Rock or Bust World Tour, he released a video statement confirming his departure.

After completing the tour in 2016, AC/DC went on hiatus. Over the next few years, speculation grew that former members Johnson and Rudd were back and working with the band again. A fan living near the Warehouse Studio, Vancouver claimed to have observed them in the outdoor area of the studio from an apartment window. The rumors have been confirmed to be true two years later, as on 30 September 2020, they announced the return of Johnson, Williams and Rudd to the line-up alongside Angus and Stevie, reuniting the Rock or Bust line-up. On 9 September 2023, one month before their scheduled show on the Power Trip festival, AC/DC revealed that Williams was part of the line-up after coming out of retirement, and American drummer Matt Laug, who had previously played for Slash's Snakepit and Alice Cooper, replaced Rudd. The Power Up Tour was announced on 12 February, with former Jane's Addiction bassist Chris Chaney replacing Williams.

== Members ==
=== Current ===
Image	Name	Years active	Instruments	Release contributions
	Angus Young	1973–present	lead guitar; occasional backing vocals	all AC/DC releases
	Phil Rudd	1975–1983; 1994–2015; 2018–present (not touring since 2023)	drums; percussion	all AC/DC releases from T.N.T. (1975) to Flick of the Switch (1983), and since Ballbreaker (1995)
	Cliff Williams	1977–2016; 2018–present (not touring since 2024)	bass guitar; backing vocals	all AC/DC releases since Powerage (1978)
	Brian Johnson	1980–2016; 2018–present	lead vocals	all AC/DC releases since Back in Black (1980)
	Stevie Young	1988 (touring); 2014–present	rhythm guitar; backing vocals	All AC/DC releases since Rock or Bust (2014)

=== Former ===
Image	Name	Years active	Instruments	Release contributions
	Malcolm Young	1973–2014 (died 2017)	rhythm guitar; backing vocals; occasional lead guitar and bass guitar	all AC/DC releases from "Can I Sit Next to You, Girl" (1974) to Live at River Plate (2012)
	Colin Burgess	1973–1974; 1975; (died 2023)	drums	"Can I Sit Next to You, Girl/ Rockin' In The Parlour" (1974). Returned to fill in for Rudd temporarily in 1975, for live performances only
	Larry Van Kriedt	1973–1974; 1975	bass guitar	none – live performances only
	Dave Evans	1973–1974	lead vocals	"Can I Sit Next to You, Girl/ Rockin' In The Parlour" (1974)
	Neil Smith	1974 (died 2013)	bass guitar	none – live performances only
	Ron Carpenter	1974	drums	none – live performances only
	Russell Coleman	1974	drums	none – live performances only
	Noel Taylor	1974	drums	none – live performances only
	Rob Bailey	1974–1975	bass guitar	High Voltage (1975)
	Peter Clack	1974–1975	drums	High Voltage (1975) – "Baby, Please Don't Go" only
	Bon Scott	1974–1980 (until his death)	lead vocals	all AC/DC releases from High Voltage (1975) to Highway to Hell (1979)
	Paul Matters	1975 (died 2020)	bass guitar	none – live performances only
	Mark Evans	1975–1977	bass guitar	all AC/DC releases from T.N.T. (1975) to Let There Be Rock (1977)
	Simon Wright	1983–1989	drums; percussion	all AC/DC releases from Fly on the Wall (1985) to Blow Up Your Video (1988)
	Chris Slade	1989–1994; 2015–2016	drums; percussion	all AC/DC releases from The Razors Edge (1990) to "Big Gun" (1993)

=== Others ===
Image	Name	Years active	Instruments	Notes
	Mick Sheffzick	1973	bass guitar	Before formation, he was recruited by Malcolm alongside Burgess, but was eventually replaced by Van Kriedt.
	George Young	1974–1975 (died 2017)	bass guitar; backing vocals; rhythm guitar; drums	George Young, who was primarily a guitarist, filled in on bass on several occasions during the band's early shows, amid frequent lineup changes. He also played bass on a number of tracks on High Voltage (1975).
	Tony Currenti	1974	drums	Played drums on seven songs for High Voltage (1975) plus the "High Voltage" single as a session musician before Rudd joined.
	Denis Loughlin	1974 (died 2019)	lead vocals	Loughlin, the band's manager at the time, would occasionally substitute for Dave Evans during early shows.
	Bruce Howe	1975	bass guitar, backing vocals	Howe, Bon Scott's former bandmate in Fraternity, performed bass a number of times with the group.
	Paul Gregg	1991	bass guitar, backing vocals	Gregg replaced Cliff Williams for several shows on the US leg of the Razors Edge World Tour due to illness.
	Bob Richards	2014	drums	Substituted for Phil Rudd on the "Play Ball" and "Rock or Bust" music video.
	Axl Rose	2016	lead vocals	Filled in for the last two legs of the Rock or Bust World Tour, due to Johnson's hearing problems.
	Matt Laug	2023–present	drums	Fill in for Phil Rudd for the Power Trip Festival, and the Power Up Tour.
	Chris Chaney	2024–present	bass guitar; backing vocals	Fill in for Cliff Williams for the Power Up Tour.

== Lineups ==
Period	Members	Releases
November 1973 – February 1974 (First line-up as AC/DC)	Dave Evans – lead vocals; Angus Young – lead guitar; Malcolm Young – rhythm guitar, backing vocals; Larry Van Kriedt – bass guitar; Colin Burgess – drums	none
February 1974	Dave Evans – lead vocals; Angus Young – lead guitar; Malcolm Young – rhythm guitar, backing vocals; Larry Van Kriedt – bass guitar; George Young – drums (substitute)	none
February 1974	Dave Evans – lead vocals; Angus Young – lead guitar; Malcolm Young – rhythm guitar, backing vocals; George Young – bass guitar (substitute); Colin Burgess – drums	"Can I Sit Next to You, Girl" (1974)
February 1974	Dave Evans – lead vocals; Angus Young – lead guitar; Malcolm Young – rhythm guitar, backing vocals; Larry Van Kriedt – bass guitar; Ron Carpenter – drums	none
February 1974	Dave Evans – lead vocals; Angus Young – lead guitar; Malcolm Young – rhythm guitar, backing vocals; Larry Van Kriedt – bass guitar; Russell Coleman – drums	none
February–April 1974	Dave Evans – lead vocals; Angus Young – lead guitar; Malcolm Young – rhythm guitar, backing vocals; Neil Smith – bass guitar; Noel Taylor – drums	none
April–September 1974	Dave Evans – lead vocals; Angus Young – lead guitar; Malcolm Young – rhythm guitar, backing vocals; Rob Bailey – bass guitar; Peter Clack – drums	none
September–November 1974	Bon Scott – lead vocals; Angus Young – lead guitar; Malcolm Young – rhythm guitar, backing vocals; Rob Bailey – bass guitar; Peter Clack – drums	High Voltage (1975)
November 1974	Bon Scott – lead vocals; Angus Young – lead guitar; Malcolm Young – rhythm guitar, backing vocals; Rob Bailey – bass guitar; Tony Currenti – drums (substitute)	High Voltage (1975)
November 1974	Bon Scott – lead vocals; Angus Young – lead guitar; Malcolm Young – rhythm guitar, backing vocals; George Young – bass guitar (substitute); Tony Currenti – drums (substitute)	High Voltage (1975)
November 1974 – January 1975	Bon Scott – lead vocals; Angus Young – lead guitar; Malcolm Young – rhythm guitar, backing vocals; Rob Bailey – bass guitar; Peter Clack – drums	none
January–February 1975	Bon Scott – lead vocals; Angus Young – lead guitar; Malcolm Young – rhythm guitar, backing vocals; Larry Van Kriedt – bass guitar; Phil Rudd – drums	none
February 1975	Bon Scott – lead vocals; Angus Young – lead guitar; Malcolm Young – rhythm guitar, backing vocals; George Young – bass guitar (substitute); Phil Rudd – drums	none
February–March 1975	Bon Scott – lead vocals; Angus Young – lead guitar; Malcolm Young – rhythm guitar, backing vocals; Paul Matters – bass guitar; Phil Rudd – drums	none
March 1975	Bon Scott – lead vocals; Angus Young – lead guitar; Malcolm Young – rhythm guitar, backing vocals; George Young – bass guitar (substitute); Phil Rudd – drums	none
March 1975 – May 1977	Bon Scott – lead vocals; Angus Young – lead guitar; Malcolm Young – rhythm guitar, backing vocals; Mark Evans – bass guitar; Phil Rudd – drums	T.N.T. (1975); Dirty Deeds Done Dirt Cheap (1976); Let There Be Rock (1977)
May 1977 – February 1980	Bon Scott – lead vocals; Angus Young – lead guitar; Malcolm Young – rhythm guitar, backing vocals; Cliff Williams – bass guitar, backing vocals; Phil Rudd – drums	Powerage (1978); If You Want Blood You've Got It (1978); Highway to Hell (1979); AC/DC: Let There Be Rock (1980); Live from the Atlantic Studios (1997)
February–March 1980	Angus Young – lead guitar; Malcolm Young – rhythm guitar, backing vocals; Cliff Williams – bass guitar, backing vocals; Phil Rudd – drums	none
April 1980 – April 1983	Brian Johnson – lead vocals; Angus Young – lead guitar; Malcolm Young – rhythm guitar, backing vocals; Cliff Williams – bass guitar, backing vocals; Phil Rudd – drums	Back in Black (1980); For Those About to Rock We Salute You (1981); Flick of the Switch (1983)
July 1983 – May 1988	Brian Johnson – lead vocals; Angus Young – lead guitar; Malcolm Young – rhythm guitar, backing vocals; Cliff Williams – bass guitar, backing vocals; Simon Wright – drums	Fly on the Wall (1985); Who Made Who (1986); Blow Up Your Video (1988)
May–November 1988	Brian Johnson – lead vocals; Angus Young – lead guitar; Stevie Young – rhythm guitar, backing vocals (substitute); Cliff Williams – bass guitar, backing vocals; Simon Wright – drums	none
November 1988 – November 1989	Brian Johnson – lead vocals; Angus Young – lead guitar; Malcolm Young – rhythm guitar, backing vocals; Cliff Williams – bass guitar, backing vocals; Simon Wright – drums	none
November 1989 – August 1994	Brian Johnson – lead vocals; Angus Young – lead guitar; Malcolm Young – rhythm guitar, backing vocals; Cliff Williams – bass guitar, backing vocals; Chris Slade – drums	The Razors Edge (1990); AC/DC Live (1992); Live at Donington (1992); "Big Gun" (1993)
August 1994 – April 2014	Brian Johnson – lead vocals; Angus Young – lead guitar; Malcolm Young – rhythm guitar, backing vocals; Cliff Williams – bass guitar, backing vocals; Phil Rudd – drums	Ballbreaker (1995); No Bull (1996); Stiff Upper Lip (2000); Stiff Upper Lip Live (2001); Black Ice (2008); Live at River Plate (2012)
April 2014 – February 2015	Brian Johnson – lead vocals; Angus Young – lead guitar; Stevie Young – rhythm guitar, backing vocals; Cliff Williams – bass guitar, backing vocals; Phil Rudd – drums	Rock or Bust (2014)
February 2015 – April 2016	Brian Johnson – lead vocals; Angus Young – lead guitar; Stevie Young – rhythm guitar, backing vocals; Cliff Williams – bass guitar, backing vocals; Chris Slade – drums	none
April–September 2016	Axl Rose – lead vocals (touring); Angus Young – lead guitar; Stevie Young – rhythm guitar, backing vocals; Cliff Williams – bass guitar, backing vocals; Chris Slade – drums	none
Band on hiatus September 2016 – August 2018
August 2018 – September 2023	Brian Johnson – lead vocals; Angus Young – lead guitar; Stevie Young – rhythm guitar, backing vocals; Cliff Williams – bass guitar, backing vocals; Phil Rudd – drums	Power Up (2020)
September 2023 – February 2024	Brian Johnson – lead vocals; Angus Young – lead guitar; Stevie Young – rhythm guitar, backing vocals; Cliff Williams – bass guitar, backing vocals; Matt Laug – drums (touring)	none
February 2024 – present	Brian Johnson – lead vocals; Angus Young – lead guitar; Stevie Young – rhythm guitar, backing vocals; Chris Chaney – bass guitar, backing vocals (touring); Matt Laug – drums (touring)	none
