= High Voltage (1976 album) =

1976 international studio album by AC/DC

Studio album by AC/DC
- Released: 14 May 1976
- Recorded: November 1974 (Note: Tracks 7 and 8); March 1975 (Note: Track 9); May 1975 (Note: Tracks 3); July 1975 (Note: Tracks 1, 2, 4–6)
- Studio: Albert (Sydney)
- Genre: Hard rock; blues rock
- Length: 44:23
- Label: Atlantic; ATCO
- Producer: Harry Vanda; George Young

AC/DC chronology
T.N.T. (1975)	High Voltage (1976)	Dirty Deeds Done Dirt Cheap (1976)

Alternative cover
- Original European cover

Singles from High Voltage
- 1. "It's a Long Way to the Top" Released: April 1976 (UK); 2. "High Voltage" Released: October 1976 (UK)

High Voltage is the first internationally released album by Australian hard rock band AC/DC. It contains tracks compiled from their first two previous Australia-only issued albums: High Voltage and T.N.T. (both released in 1975).

Originally released on 14 May 1976 in the UK by Atlantic Records and on 28 September 1976 in the US by ATCO Records, High Voltage was a commercial success, selling three million units in the US alone. However, the album was initially panned by some critics upon its release, including a review by Rolling Stone magazine's Billy Altman that called it an "all-time low" for the hard rock genre. It was re-released in 2003 as part of the AC/DC Remasters series.

== Background ==
In December 1975, Atlantic Records' UK head Phil Carson signed AC/DC to a worldwide deal. The group's first two albums, High Voltage and the harder driving T.N.T., had been hits in their native Australia – the single "It's a Long Way to the Top (If You Wanna Rock 'n' Roll)" peaked at #5 – and now plans were made for the band to tour England in 1976. The group had already recorded their next single "Jailbreak" (for which they had shot a music video) and had already begun recording their third LP Dirty Deeds Done Dirt Cheap when, in April 1976, they flew out on their first British tour. The international release only included two tracks from the Australian High Voltage release – "She's Got Balls" and "Little Lover" – with the rest of the songs taken from T.N.T. The band arrived in the UK in the midst of the fledgling punk movement, spearheaded by bands like the Sex Pistols and the Damned. AC/DC was never really part of the movement, but got misidentified as such by some observers, as guitarist Angus Young recalled to Guitar World's Alan Di Perna in 1993:

At that time… we were giving punk music a good name. Because that was the word they used to describe us – punk band. They'd get the wrong idea. We weren't punk, but they'd put us on the same bill as punk bands. And they sure got a shock when they started spitting at us and we spat back. We were never ones for getting slumped under a tag or filed under A, B, or C. We started as a rock and roll band. That's what we play – what we do best. We never claimed to be anything else.

In 2010 Malcolm Young concurred, telling Mojo's Phil Alexander, "Punk rock was just a fashion. … It didn't change the music; it changed the fashion, and that's basically all it is." In a 1977 interview with ABC's Countdown, Bon Scott insisted, "We're pulling bigger crowds than they are. I mean, we've got our following here. It's not new wave, it's not punk, it's just people who like our band. We honestly thought that the punk and the new wave thing might spoil it a bit for us but it hasn't at all. It was a big fad, just like anything else, a big fad for a while. … The main thing about it is it gave rock music a real kick in the guts."

== Recording ==
"It's a Long Way to the Top (If You Wanna Rock 'n' Roll)" was edited down from an extended jam by producer George Young (older brother of guitarist Malcolm Young and Angus) and the inclusion of the bagpipes was his idea to add an extra dynamic to the track. Singer Bon Scott had played in a pipe band in his teens, so George suggested he play bagpipes on the song, not realizing that Scott had been a drummer, not a piper. Regardless, Scott – who knew how to play the recorder – learned the instrument and went on to play them on stage with the band for several years. In Murray Engleheart's book AC/DC: Maximum Rock & Roll, former manager Michael Browning states that the bagpipes became the bane of Scott's existence: "I think they probably put more pressure on him than anything I can think of! They invariably never worked. It's a hard instrument to time to guitars, because you're pumping them and they kind of kick in when the bag's full – very difficult to time to guitars." The chanting in "T.N.T." was also George Young's idea, added after he heard Angus ad-libbing the "oi" chant to himself, and suggested he record it.

The production team of George Young and Harry Vanda was crucial in the development of AC/DC's sound. Vanda was a bandmate of Young's in The Easybeats and the pair were the main songwriters of The Easybeats' later hits, including their international hit "Friday on My Mind". In the 1994 book Highway to Hell: The Life and Times of AC/DC Legend Bon Scott, Chris Gilbey, who was the promotion man at Albert Productions at the time, recalls to author Clinton Walker, "The great thing George and Harry taught me, as a producer, was that if you got a good rhythm track, you've got the beginnings of a record. If you don't, you've got nothing." In the same memoir Michael Browning confirms, "George and Harry's most important criterion was rhythm, the whole thing had to just feel right. If you listen to those records today, they feel good."

== Composition ==
AC/DC's second album T.N.T. was a breakthrough for the band composition-wise and sound-wise, containing more of the twin-guitar assault that the band would become famous for, and this may explain why only two songs were included from the glam rock – leaning 1975 debut. "She's Got Balls" (about Scott's ex-wife Irene) was the first song that Scott and the Young brothers put together, while "Little Lover" had been a song Malcolm had been tinkering with since he was about 14 and had been originally titled "Front Row Fantasies" (Scott claimed to have written the song about Angus). "Can I Sit Next to You Girl" predated Scott's involvement in the band, having been recorded as a single with former vocalist Dave Evans; it features a different arrangement and slightly different lyrics from the original version. It also runs almost a minute longer. In 1993, Angus Young shared the origins of the title track with Vic Garbarini of Guitar For the Practicing Musician: "I remember sitting home one night before going into the studio and playing around with some chords, and I suddenly thought, let's try playing...A...C...D...C. Sounded good. And then I thought AC/DC...power..."High Voltage"! I sang the chorus part to my brother in the studio and he thought it sounded great." Lyrically, the LP features Bon Scott chronicling both the good and the bad about the rock and roll lifestyle, warning aspiring musicians that "it's harder than it looks" ("It's a Long Way to the Top") but also defiantly telling the moral majority to "stick your moral standards 'cause it's all a dirty lie" ("Rock 'n' Roll Singer"). In 1994 biographer Clifton Walker observed that Scott was "virtually encapsulating his entire life" in both songs. The lyrics of "The Jack" (sometimes titled "(She's Got) The Jack") were developed by Scott who was inspired by a letter Malcolm Young received during a tour of Adelaide. The letter, from a woman in Melbourne, implied that Malcolm had given her a venereal disease, although he claims that when he got tested, he was clean. Scott's original lyrics were far more explicit than those heard on the album, which he deliberately toned down in case the song got played on radio. The bravado-driven "Live Wire", which was also sexually suggestive, would be the band's show-opener for several years.

== Releases ==
The international release of High Voltage also had two different album covers from the original: one featured a picture of Angus Young as he appeared on the cover of the German single for "It's a Long Way to the Top (If You Wanna Rock 'n' Roll)". An alternative cover was used on the international version's European release. Most editions of the international album have a version of "It's a Long Way to the Top" that is shorter than the original album version. The full length version is 5:10, while the edited version shortens the last chorus causing the track to fade out early at 5:01. Vinyl editions of the international album contain the edited version. The 1994 remastered CD on Atco Records replaced the edited version of the track with the full length version. The 2003 remastered CD on Epic Records reverted it back to the edited version.

=== Uses in pop culture ===
The track "T.N.T." is used in Tony Hawk's Pro Skater 4.

The High Voltage Arc in the seventh part of JoJo's Bizarre Adventure: Steel Ball Run by Hirohiko Araki is a reference to this album and song.

The album sleeve was used as a prop in a first-season episode of The Cosby Show, titled "The Younger Woman". In the story, the fictional musician named with the album is "Clyde", and is described on the album cover as "sticking his tongue out," which is an accurate description of Angus Young's actual expression on the cover, although the album and band's names in the upper left corner are both stylistically covered up.

== Reception ==
Professional ratings
Review scores
Source	Rating
AllMusic	4.5/5 stars
Blender	4/5 stars
Classic Rock	4.5/5 stars
Collector's Guide to Heavy Metal	8/10
The Encyclopedia of Popular Music	2/5 stars
The Great Rock Discography	8/10
Rolling Stone	3/5 stars
Spin Alternative Record Guide	4/10

The album received mixed reviews when it was released in the United States. Billboard listed it in its "Recommended LPs" column, calling it a cross between Led Zeppelin and the Sensational Alex Harvey Band. However, the album was trashed by Billy Altman in his infamous review for Rolling Stone: "Those concerned with the future of hard rock may take solace in knowing that with the release of the first U.S. album by these Australian gross-out champions, the genre has hit its all-time low. Lead singer Bon Scott spits out his vocals with a truly annoying aggression which, I suppose, is the only way to do it when all you seem to care about is being a star so that you can get laid every night. Stupidity bothers me. Calculated stupidity offends me." Initially they had given the album two stars, but in recent years have warmed up to it and given it three stars out of five, (which means in their terms, "Good: a record of average worth, but one that might possess considerable appeal for fans of a particular style.")

Retrospective reviews have been more positive. AllMusic's review by Stephen Thomas Erlewine praised Angus Young's "monster riffs" which appear to be easy but give the music its strength and this allows Scott to be "somebody who never hid the notion that lurking behind the door are some bad, dangerous things, but they're also fun, too." Classic Rock magazine meanwhile praised the albums' production as well as the unique usage of bagpipes in a rock song and the quality of Bon's lyricism, hailing it overall as "an international debut to savour." Canadian journalist Martin Popoff appreciated High Voltage's "party intent" and remarked how the album "evokes an exposed simplicity that begs its fans to take over, and that's the magic of the band." Reviewing its 1994 remastered reissue, John Reed of Record Collector writes that although High Voltage and Dirty Deeds Done Dirt Cheap owed much to Aerosmith, the Rolling Stones and Status Quo, it is AC/DC's "wickedness and irreverence that wins through" on both records.

== Track listing ==
All tracks are written by Angus Young, Malcolm Young and Bon Scott except where noted.

Side one
No.	Title	Length
1.	"It's a Long Way to the Top (If You Wanna Rock 'n' Roll)"	5:12
2.	"Rock 'n' Roll Singer"	5:04
3.	"The Jack"	5:53
4.	"Live Wire"	5:50

Side two
No.	Title	Writer(s)	Length
5.	"T.N.T."		3:35
6.	"Can I Sit Next to You Girl"	A. Young; M. Young	4:12
7.	"Little Lover"		5:40
8.	"She's Got Balls"		4:52
9.	"High Voltage"		4:04
Total length:			44:23

Notes

- Published by J. Albert & Son Pty Ltd.
- Tracks 7 & 8 were previously released on the band's first Australian studio album High Voltage in February 1975. The rest were previously released on the band's second Australian studio album T.N.T. in December 1975.

== Personnel ==
AC/DC

- Bon Scott – lead vocals, bagpipes on "It's a Long Way to the Top (If You Wanna Rock 'n' Roll)"
- Angus Young – lead guitar
- Malcolm Young – rhythm guitar, lead guitar on "Little Lover", backing vocals
- Mark Evans – bass guitar (1–6)
- Phil Rudd – drums (1–6)

Additional personnel

- George Young – bass guitar (9)
- Rob Bailey – bass guitar (7–8)
- Tony Currenti – drums (7–9)

Production

- Harry Vanda – producer
- George Young – producer
- Michael Putland – cover art
- Dave Field – cover art (European version)
- Gerard Huerta – cover lettering
- Richard Ford – artwork

== Charts ==
Chart (1981–1982)	Peak position
US Billboard 200	146

Chart (2015)	Peak position
Australian Albums (ARIA)	13
Spanish Albums (Promusicae)	90
Swedish Albums (Sverigetopplistan)	58
Swiss Albums (Schweizer Hitparade)	67

Chart (2024)	Peak position
German Albums (Offizielle Top 100)	12
Swiss Albums (Schweizer Hitparade)	18
UK Rock & Metal Albums (OCC)	10

== Certifications ==
Region	Certification	Certified units/sales
Canada (Music Canada)	2× Platinum	200,000^{‡}
Denmark (IFPI Danmark)	Gold	10,000^{‡}
France (SNEP)	Gold	100,000^{*}
Germany (BVMI)	Platinum	500,000^{^}
Italy (FIMI)	Platinum	50,000^{‡}
Spain (Promusicae)	Gold	50,000^{^}
Switzerland (IFPI Switzerland)	Platinum	50,000^{^}
United Kingdom (BPI)	Gold	100,000^{*}
United States (RIAA)	4× Platinum	4,000,000^{‡}
^{*} Sales figures based on certification alone.^{^} Shipments figures based on certification alone.^{‡} Sales+streaming figures based on certification alone.
