= '74 Jailbreak =

EP by AC/DC
- Released: 18 October 1984
- Recorded: November 1974; January 1976
- Studio: Albert (Sydney)
- Genres: Hard rock; blues rock
- Length: 24:22
- Label: Atlantic
- Producers: Harry Vanda; George Young

AC/DC chronology
Flick of the Switch (1983)	'74 Jailbreak (1984)	Fly on the Wall (1985)

Professional ratings
Review scores
Source	Rating
AllMusic	3/5 stars
Collector's Guide to Heavy Metal	7/10

'74 Jailbreak is the only EP by Australian rock band AC/DC, released on October 18, 1984. It is composed of five tracks that had previously been released only in Australia. Despite the EP's title, the song "Jailbreak" was actually recorded in 1976 and was originally released that year on the Australian version of the Dirty Deeds Done Dirt Cheap album. The EP's four other tracks were originally released on the Australian version of the band's debut album, High Voltage, recorded in 1974 and released early the following year.

"Jailbreak" was released as a single with accompanying music video at the same time as the EP. '74 Jailbreak was later re-released worldwide in 2003 as part of the AC/DC Remasters series.

== Track listing ==
All tracks are written by Angus Young, Malcolm Young and Bon Scott, except where noted.

Side one
No.	Title	Length
1.	"Jailbreak"	4:40
2.	"You Ain't Got a Hold on Me"	3:31
3.	"Show Business"	4:46
Total length:		12:57

Side two
No.	Title	Writer(s)	Length
4.	"Soul Stripper"	A. Young, M. Young	6:25
5.	"Baby, Please Don't Go"	Big Joe Williams	5:00
Total length:			11:25 24:22

== Personnel ==
AC/DC

- Bon Scott – lead vocals
- Angus Young – lead guitar (tracks 1 & 5), rhythm guitar
- Malcolm Young – rhythm guitar, lead guitar (tracks 2–4), backing vocals
- Mark Evans – bass guitar on "Jailbreak"
- Rob Bailey – bass guitar on all but "Jailbreak"
- Phil Rudd – drums on "Jailbreak"
- Peter Clack – drums on "Baby, Please Don't Go"

Session members

- Tony Currenti – drums on tracks 2–4
- George Young – production, backing vocals
- Harry Vanda – production

== Charts ==
2024 chart performance for '74 Jailbreak
Chart (2024)	Peak position
Swiss Albums (Schweizer Hitparade)	58

== Certifications ==
Region	Certification	Certified units/sales
United States (RIAA)	Platinum	1,000,000^{^}
^{^} Shipments figures based on certification alone.
