= It's a Long Way to the Top (If You Wanna Rock 'n' Roll) =

1975 single by AC/DC

Single by AC/DC

from the album T.N.T.
- B-side: "Can I Sit Next to You Girl"
- Released: 8 December 1975 (AUS); 1976 (International); 15 April 1976 (UK)
- Recorded: 1975
- Studio: Albert (Sydney)
- Genre: Hard rock
- Length: 5:15
- Label: Albert
- Songwriters: Angus Young; Malcolm Young; Bon Scott
- Producers: Harry Vanda; George Young

AC/DC singles chronology
"High Voltage" (1975)	"It's a Long Way to the Top (If You Wanna Rock 'n' Roll)" (1975)	"T.N.T." (1976)

"It's a Long Way to the Top (If You Wanna Rock 'n' Roll)" (also simply titled "It's a Long Way to the Top") is a song by Australian hard rock band AC/DC. It is the first track of the group's second album T.N.T., released only in Australia and New Zealand on 8 December 1975, and was written by Angus Young, Malcolm Young and Bon Scott. The song combines bagpipes with hard rock instrumentation; in the middle section of the song there is a call and response between the bagpipes and guitar. The original recording is in B-flat major, but it was played live in A major.

Record World said that it shows "a firm grasp on rock dynamics" and sounds "like a cross between the Stones and the Easybeats."

The song is also the first track on the internationally released High Voltage (April 1976).

The full version of the song is also on the Volts CD of the Bonfire box set, released in 1997.

Despite being one of the band's most popular songs, AC/DC chose to retire the song from live performance out of respect for Scott following his death.

In January 2018, as part of Triple M's "Ozzest 100", the 'most Australian' songs of all time, "It's a Long Way to the Top (If You Wanna Rock 'n' Roll)" was ranked number 5.

== Lyrics ==
"It's a Long Way to the Top" (1975)
The second single of High Voltage demonstrates a combination of the bagpipes with more traditional rock instruments while the lyrics discuss the perils of being in a rock band.

The song chronicles the hardships endured by a rock band on tour, such as being robbed, assaulted, and cheated by a greedy agent. However, the band accepts these hardships as natural on the path to stardom, saying that "It's a long way to the top/If you wanna rock 'n' roll".

== Bagpipes ==
While jamming on new songs in the studio, co-producer George Young (the older brother of Angus and Malcolm) recalled that Bon Scott had once been in a pipe band and encouraged the band to experiment with incorporating bagpipes into the song. Scott left the studio that day and returned with a set of bagpipes purchased at a Park Street music store at what was an extortionately high price (AU$479) at the time. Bassist Mark Evans would later muse that the amount "would have bought two Strats". Simply putting the pipe-set together proved tricky, and it became apparent Scott had never played the instrument before, having in fact been a drummer in the aforementioned pipe band. Nonetheless, Scott taught himself to play well enough to record and perform the song (initially with the help of tape loops).

However, playing the song live was made difficult by the fact that the whole band would have to tune to the drone pipe. Thus the song, though iconic of the band's early repertoire, was probably played live no more than 30 times. The last occasion was likely in 1976, following an incident where Scott set down the pipe-set at the corner of a stage and they were destroyed by fans. Subsequent (relatively rare) live performances employed a recording of the song's bagpipe track or an extended guitar solo by Angus Young.

== Personnel ==
- Bon Scott – lead vocals, bagpipes
- Angus Young – lead guitar
- Malcolm Young – rhythm guitar, backing vocals
- Mark Evans – bass guitar
- Phil Rudd – drums
- Harry Vanda, George Young – producers

== Music video ==
The music video for "It's a Long Way to the Top (If You Wanna Rock 'n' Roll)", was filmed on 23 February 1976 for the Australian music television program Countdown. It featured the band and the members of the Rats of Tobruk Pipe band on the back of a flatbed truck travelling on Swanston Street in Melbourne. The video was directed by Paul Drane. David Olney was the cameraman and had a budget of $380. The video was uploaded to YouTube on 24 May 2010, and it amassed over 38 million views.

Three other videos for the song exist. One version, filmed the same day as the truck version, features the group miming the song on a stage in Melbourne's City Square in front of an audience.

== Popularity ==
In May 2001, Australasian Performing Right Association (APRA) celebrated its 75th anniversary by naming the Best Australian Songs of all time, as decided by a 100-member industry panel. "It's a Long Way to the Top (If You Wanna Rock 'n' Roll)" was ranked as the ninth song on the list. In 2010 it was ranked no. 3 in Triple M's Ultimate 500 Rock Countdown in Melbourne. The top five were all AC/DC songs. It was inducted into the National Film and Sound Archive's Sounds of Australia in 2012.

The song was also used in the comedy movie School of Rock (2003), both AC/DC's version and in a performance by the film's cast, and during Only the Brave (2017).

Since 2023, the song has been used as an introduction to Metallica's live performances.

== Charts ==
=== Weekly charts ===
Chart (1975–76)	Peak position
Australian (Kent Music Report)	9

=== Year-end charts ===
Chart (1976)	Position
Australia (Kent Music Report)	80

== Certifications ==
Region	Certification	Certified units/sales
Canada (Music Canada)	2× Platinum	160,000^{‡}
Italy (FIMI)	Gold	50,000^{‡}
New Zealand (RMNZ)	Platinum	30,000^{‡}
United Kingdom (BPI)	Gold	400,000^{‡}
United States (RIAA)	Platinum	1,000,000^{‡}
^{‡} Sales+streaming figures based on certification alone.

== Connection to ACDC Lane ==
On 1 October 2004 Melbourne's Corporation Lane was officially renamed "ACDC Lane" in honour of the band (street names in the City of Melbourne cannot contain the "/" character). This change was made in part because the music video for "It's a Long Way to the Top (If You Wanna Rock 'n' Roll)" was filmed on Melbourne's Swanston Street, near ACDC Lane. The Melbourne City Council's vote to rename the street was unanimous. Bagpipers played "It's a Long Way to the Top (If You Wanna Rock 'n' Roll)" at the official renaming ceremony.
