= T.N.T. (song) =

1976 single by AC/DC

Single by AC/DC

from the album T.N.T.
- B-side: "Rocker"
- Released: 1 March 1976
- Recorded: 1975
- Studio: Albert (Sydney)
- Genre: Hard rock
- Length: 3:35
- Label: Albert
- Songwriters: Angus Young; Malcolm Young; Bon Scott
- Producers: Harry Vanda; George Young

AC/DC singles chronology
"It's a Long Way to the Top (If You Wanna Rock 'n' Roll)" (1975)	"T.N.T." (1976)	"Jailbreak" (1976)

"T.N.T." is a song recorded in 1975 by Australian hard rock band AC/DC, taken from their Australian album T.N.T. and the international version of High Voltage. It was released as a single in 1976 and was written by Bon Scott, Angus Young and Malcolm Young. It peaked at No.19 on the Australian Kent Music Report Singles Chart. The song's title is a reference to the explosive chemical TNT.

A slightly modified line from the song, "Lock up your daughters", was used as the title of AC/DC's first headlining tour of Great Britain in 1976 after the band's move from Melbourne, Australia, to London, earlier that year. "T.N.T." later appeared on Live and the Live: 2 CD Collector's Edition, with Brian Johnson, Cliff Williams, and Chris Slade providing vocals, bass, and drums, respectively.

In January 2018, as part of Triple M's "Ozzest 100", the 'most Australian' songs of all time, "T.N.T." was ranked number 81.

== Personnel ==
- Bon Scott – lead vocals
- Angus Young – lead guitar, backing vocals
- Malcolm Young – rhythm guitar, backing vocals
- Mark Evans – bass guitar
- Phil Rudd – drums
- Harry Vanda – producer
- George Young – producer

== Charts ==
Chart (1976–1977)	Peak position
Australia (Kent Music Report)	19

== Certifications ==
Region	Certification	Certified units/sales
Brazil (Pro-Música Brasil)	Gold	30,000^{‡}
Canada (Music Canada)	5× Platinum	400,000^{‡}
Denmark (IFPI Danmark)	Gold	45,000^{‡}
Germany (BVMI)	Platinum	600,000^{‡}
Italy (FIMI)	Platinum	70,000^{‡}
Mexico (AMPROFON)	Diamond	300,000^{‡}
New Zealand (RMNZ)	3× Platinum	90,000^{‡}
Portugal (AFP)	Gold	20,000^{‡}
Spain (Promusicae)	Platinum	60,000^{‡}
United Kingdom (BPI)	Platinum	600,000^{‡}
United States (RIAA)	3× Platinum	3,000,000^{‡}
^{‡} Sales+streaming figures based on certification alone.

== Covers ==
- American death metal band Six Feet Under recorded a cover version of the song for their album Graveyard Classics.

== Anthrax version ==
"T.N.T."

Song by Anthrax

from the EP Anthems
- Released: 19 March 2013
- Genre: Heavy metal
- Length: 3:37
- Label: Megaforce; Nuclear Blast
- Songwriters: Angus Young; Malcolm Young; Bon Scott
- Producers: Anthrax; Jay Ruston; Rob Caggiano

The Anthrax cover of this song was released on their 2013 covers EP Anthems. They debuted the song live 21 February 2013 at The HiFi in Brisbane, Australia ahead of Soundwave. Later on their tour in the US, Slash and Kirk Hammett (at separate gigs) joined them for this song.

== In popular culture ==
- The song is used for the Calgary Flames' goal song.
- The song was played in commercials for the 2004 film Napoleon Dynamite.
- The song appears on the soundtrack and the intro to the 2002 skateboarding video game Tony Hawk's Pro Skater 4.
- After the September 11 attacks, the song was included on a widely circulated Clear Channel employee's list of potentially upsetting songs.
- The song is featured in the 2006 film Talladega Nights: The Ballad of Ricky Bobby.
- TNT's NASCAR coverage NASCAR on TNT used the song as its theme music from 2010 to 2014.
- It appears in a 2023 commercial for Wal-Mart.
- The Fremantle Football Club in the AFL play the song after every home game victory.
- The Northwestern Wildcats football team plays the song after every home game turnover.
- Teddy Swims included the song in his pre-game entertainment set at the 2025 NRL Grand Final in Sydney on 5 October 2025.
- The song is before every game with Luleå Hockey.
- The song is played during UFC fighter Jack Della Maddalena’s walk to the Octagon.
