= High Voltage (song) =

1975 single by AC/DC

Single by AC/DC

from the album T.N.T.
- B-side: "Soul Stripper" (AUS) "Live Wire" (UK)
- Released: 23 June 1975
- Recorded: March 1975
- Studio: Albert (Sydney)
- Genre: Hard rock
- Length: 4:20
- Label: Albert
- Songwriters: Angus Young; Malcolm Young; Bon Scott
- Producers: Harry Vanda; George Young

AC/DC singles chronology
"Baby, Please Don't Go" (1975)	"High Voltage" (1975)	"It's a Long Way to the Top (If You Wanna Rock 'n' Roll)" (1975)

Music video
- "High Voltage" on YouTube

"High Voltage" is a song by Australian hard rock band AC/DC. It was first released in Australia as a single in July 1975, though it is the eighth track of their second Australian album T.N.T., the release itself was issued as a stand alone single. The song was written by Angus Young, Malcolm Young and Bon Scott, and peaked at #48 on the UK Singles Chart in 1980.

In January 2018, as part of Triple M's "Ozzest 100", the 'most Australian' songs of all time, "High Voltage" was ranked number 95.

== Background ==
"High Voltage" shares its name with the band's first Australian and international albums. It is the ninth and final track on the international version, released in May 1976. "High Voltage" was also released as a single in the UK and various countries in Europe in 1976.

Although Phil Rudd is erroneously credited with recording the song, the drums were actually recorded by a session drummer Tony Currenti, not long after recording sessions for the debut album High Voltage.

"High Voltage" is one of AC/DC's most popular songs, and has been included on four of the band's five official live releases: If You Want Blood You've Got It (sung by Bon Scott, 1978), Live: 2 CD Collector's Edition (sung by Scott's replacement Brian Johnson, 1992), Live from the Atlantic Studios (Scott, 1977), and Let There Be Rock: The Movie – Live in Paris (Scott, 1979) – the latter two being released in 1997 as part of the Bonfire box set.

In concerts, this song has evolved into a call and response with the crowd. The bridge where Scott sings 'I said high, I said high', has been extended with Scott (and later Brian Johnson) repeating the word 'high' in increasing loudness and high pitch, to which the crowd responds with "high" louder also. That is followed by a backing rhythm for several minutes while Angus Young improvises on the guitar.

During the 2010 Black Ice World Tour, images of Scott were projected onto the stage screens during the performance of the song's chorus to commemorate the 30th anniversary of his death.

== Personnel ==
AC/DC

- Bon Scott – lead vocals
- Angus Young – lead guitar
- Malcolm Young – rhythm guitar, backing vocals

Additional musicians

- George Young – bass guitar, backing vocals
- Tony Currenti – drums (uncredited)

== Production ==
- Producers – Harry Vanda, George Young

== Charts ==
=== Weekly charts ===
Chart (1975)	Peak position
Australian (Kent Music Report)	10

=== Year-end charts ===
Chart (1975)	Peak position
Australia (Kent Music Report)	70
