= T.N.T. (album) =

1975 studio album by AC/DC

Studio album by AC/DC
- Released: 1 December 1975
- Recorded: March 1975 (Note: Tracks 8 and 9): May 1975 (Note: Tracks 3); July 1975 (Note: Tracks 1, 2, 4–7)
- Studio: Albert (Sydney)
- Genres: Hard rock; blues rock; rock and roll
- Length: 41:55
- Label: Albert
- Producers: Harry Vanda; George Young

AC/DC chronology
High Voltage (Australasia only) (1975)	T.N.T. (1975)	High Voltage (international) (1976)

Singles from T.N.T.
- 1. "High Voltage" Released: 23 June 1975; 2. "It's a Long Way to the Top (If You Wanna Rock 'n' Roll)" Released: 8 December 1975; 3. "T.N.T." Released: 1 March 1976

T.N.T. is the second studio album by Australian hard rock band AC/DC, released only in Australia and New Zealand on 1 December 1975. This was the band's first release with bassist Mark Evans and drummer Phil Rudd, although the last two tracks feature George Young and Tony Currenti, both of whom previously appeared on High Voltage.

== Recording ==
After the success of the single "Baby, Please Don't Go" and the album High Voltage, AC/DC returned to Albert Studios in Sydney to record their second LP with producers George Young and Harry Vanda. George was the older brother of guitarists Malcolm Young and Angus Young and had enjoyed his own success in the group the Easybeats. T.N.T. marked a change in direction from AC/DC's debut album, High Voltage, which was released on 17 February 1975; whereas High Voltage featured some experimentation with the styles of its songs and had a variety of personnel filling multiple roles, T.N.T. saw the band fully embrace the formula for which they would become famous: hard-edged, rhythm and blues-based rock and roll. They also simplified their personnel system and would use it from then on out, which was Angus strictly playing lead guitar, Malcolm Young playing rhythm guitar, and the drummer and bassist being the only ones to play drums and bass guitar respectively on the albums. In Murray Engleheart's book AC/DC: Maximum Rock & Roll, producer Harry Vanda states, "I suppose there might have been one or two tracks on the first album, a few things that they were experimenting with, which probably later on they wouldn't have done anymore. So I suppose you could say that T.N.T was the one that really pulled the identity; like, this is AC/DC, there's no doubt about it, that's who it's going to be and that's how it's going to stay."

In Clifton Walker's 1994 book Highway to Hell: The Life and Times of AC/DC Legend Bon Scott, bassist Mark Evans speaks about the band's creative process during this period:

Malcolm and Angus would come up with riffs and all that, and then we'd go into the studio. Malcolm and George would sit down at the piano and work it out. Malcolm and Angus would have the barest bones of a song, the riff and different bits, and George would hammer it into a tune. Bon would be in and out when the band was recording backing tracks. Once the backing track was done, he would literally be locked in the kitchen there at Alberts, and come out with a finished song.

"It's a Long Way to the Top (If You Wanna Rock 'n' Roll)" was edited down from an extended jam by producer George Young and the inclusion of the bagpipes was his idea to add an extra dynamic to the track. Singer Bon Scott had played in a pipe band in his teens, so George suggested he play bagpipes on the song, not realizing that Scott had been a drummer, not a piper. Regardless, Scott – who knew how to play the recorder – learned the instrument and went on to play them on stage with the band up until 1976, when he set the bagpipes down on the corner of the stage and they were destroyed by fans. For the next three years, whenever they played the song live, Angus would play an extended guitar solo. Chanting in "T.N.T." was also George Young's idea, added after he heard Angus ad-libbing the "oi" chant to himself, and suggested he record it.

== Composition ==
T.N.T. contains some of the band's best-known songs, including the title track, "It's a Long Way to the Top", "The Jack", and "Rocker." Seven of the album's nine songs were written by the Young brothers and Scott, while "Can I Sit Next to You Girl" predated Scott's involvement in the band, having previously been recorded as a single with former vocalist Dave Evans. It features a different arrangement and slightly different lyrics from the original version. It also runs almost a minute longer. "School Days" is a cover version of a Chuck Berry song, a major influence on both Young brothers. "High Voltage" was the first song written and recorded for the album, the title inspired by that of the previous album. In 1993, Angus Young shared the origins of the title track with Vic Garbarini of Guitar For the Practicing Musician: "I remember sitting home one night before going into the studio and playing around with some chords, and I suddenly thought, let's try playing...A...C...D...C. Sounded good. And then I thought AC/DC...power..."High Voltage"! I sang the chorus part to my brother in the studio and he thought it sounded great." Issued as the first single before the T.N.T. sessions began, many fans thought it was from High Voltage. Chris Gilbey of Albert Productions later claimed this caused a late surge in that album's sales. Lyrically, the LP features Bon Scott chronicling both the good and the bad about the rock and roll lifestyle, warning aspiring musicians that "it's harder than it looks" ("It's a Long Way to the Top") but also defiantly telling the moral majority to "stick your moral standards 'cause it's all a dirty lie" ("Rock 'n' Roll Singer"). In 1994, biographer Clifton Walker observed that Bon was "virtually encapsulating his entire life" in both songs. The lyrics of "The Jack," sometimes titled "(She's Got) The Jack," were developed by Scott, who was inspired by a letter Malcolm Young received during a tour of Adelaide. The letter, from a woman in Melbourne, implied that Malcolm had given her a venereal disease, although he claims that when he got tested, he was clean. Scott's original lyrics were far more explicit than those heard on the album, which he deliberately toned down in case the song got played on radio. The bravado-driven "Live Wire," which was also sexually suggestive, would be the band's show-opener for several years.

Almost right from the beginning, the band was taken to task in some quarters for their "smutty" lyrics, as Angus acknowledged to Guitar World's Tom Beaujour in 1998:

I believe that the politically correct term is "sexist." Intellectuals like to put a tag on it and say, "these guys are out-and-out sexist." I've always found there's a two-sided thing when it comes to lyrics: someone can call a song "Sexy Motherfucker," and be accepted, and yet we've been writing all songs all these years, and while there may be the rare "fuck" in the lyrics there somewhere, it's all been quite clean cut. Still, people just make the assumption that we're five guys who've just got our dicks in mind. People have frequently commented that for all the notoriety and things we got involved in, we could have capitalized on our reputation and said, "Oh yeah, we're a piece of nasty work." But why bother?

T.N.T. also led to more AC/DC appearances on Australia's Countdown music program, following those in support of the Australian High Voltage album. These appearances included a live performance of the song "T.N.T.", as well as a music video for "It's a Long Way to the Top (If You Wanna Rock 'n' Roll)". Filmed on 23 February 1976, the video featured the band's then-current lineup, along with members of the Rats of Tobruk Pipe Band, on the back of a flat-bed truck travelling on Swanston Street in Melbourne. On 1 October 2004, Melbourne's Corporation Lane was renamed AC/DC Lane as a tribute to AC/DC, with the decision being based in part on this video.

== Releases ==
T.N.T. was originally released by Albert Productions, and has never been reissued by another label. Furthermore, it is the only Australian AC/DC studio album for which there is no international counterpart. However, seven of its nine songs comprise the international version of High Voltage, released in May 1976. The other two, "Rocker" and "School Days", saw worldwide release as part of Dirty Deeds Done Dirt Cheap's international version (1976/1981) and the Bonfire box set (1997) respectively.

Two singles were released from the album – "It's a Long Way to the Top (If You Wanna Rock 'n' Roll)" (December 1975) and "T.N.T." (March 1976). T.N.T. was released in a gatefold sleeve, with the inside depicting the various members on mock-ups of police identification cards, listing apparent aliases and partially obscured personal details including birthdates (only Bon Scott's is readily visible).

The original 1975 LP release featured longer versions of "Can I Sit Next to You Girl", "High Voltage" and "Rocker" compared to the versions heard on later CD releases:

- "Rocker" fades out at 2:52, however on a 1981 LP reissue, the song goes on for a few more seconds before cutting out abruptly at 2:55 as the riff hits its peak (possibly due to the recording tape running out before the song was originally supposed to end).
- "High Voltage" originally finished with a sustained guitar note followed by a single hit of the snare drum which also serves as a segue that leads directly into "School Days". This version was retained for the 1986 CD release, however the 1995 remastered CD release contains the version heard on the international High Voltage album release, which has the song fade out before hitting the sustained note. This was how the original single release ended.
- The versions of these songs included on the Deluxe Edition of the 2009 box set Backtracks are credited as being the original Australian versions. However, the songs still fade out albeit later than their international counterparts instead of keeping the original edits. When AC/DC's catalogue (except the Australian releases) became available on iTunes in November 2012, the original uncut versions of "Rocker" and "High Voltage" finally saw worldwide release on the digital version of Backtracks.

== Critical reception ==
Professional ratings
Review scores
Source	Rating
AllMusic	4/5 stars
The Encyclopedia of Popular Music	2/5 stars

Eduardo Rivadavia of AllMusic calls T.N.T. "a stellar album in its own right, and especially crucial in that it marked AC/DC's definitive break with their now seemingly heretical glam rock inclinations, in order to embrace the blue collar hard rock that would forever after be their trademark."

== Track listing ==
All tracks are written by Angus Young, Malcolm Young and Bon Scott except where noted.

Side one
No.	Title	Length
1.	"It's a Long Way to the Top (If You Wanna Rock 'n' Roll)"	5:14
2.	"Rock 'n' Roll Singer"	5:04
3.	"The Jack"	5:53
4.	"Live Wire"	5:49

Side two
No.	Title	Writer(s)	Length
5.	"T.N.T."		3:35
6.	"Rocker"		2:55
7.	"Can I Sit Next to You, Girl"	A. Young; M. Young	4:12
8.	"High Voltage"		4:20
9.	"School Days"	Chuck Berry	5:22
Total length:			41:55

== Personnel ==
AC/DC

- Bon Scott – lead vocals, bagpipes on "It's a Long Way to the Top (If You Wanna Rock 'n' Roll)"
- Angus Young – lead guitar
- Malcolm Young – rhythm guitar, backing vocals
- Mark Evans – bass guitar (1–7)
- Phil Rudd – drums, percussion (1–7)

Session musicians and production

- George Young – bass guitar (8–9), production
- Harry Vanda – production
- Tony Currenti – drums (8–9)
- Richard Ford – artwork

== Charts ==
=== Weekly charts ===
Chart (1975–1981)	Peak position
Australian Albums (Kent Music Report)	2
New Zealand Albums (RMNZ)	35

=== Year-end charts ===
Chart (1976)	Position
Australia (Kent Music Report)	15

== Certifications ==
Region	Certification	Certified units/sales
Australia (ARIA)	9× Platinum	630,000^{^}
Mexico (AMPROFON)	Platinum+Gold	90,000^{‡}
^{^} Shipments figures based on certification alone.^{‡} Sales+streaming figures based on certification alone.
