= High Voltage (1975 album) =

1975 studio album by AC/DC

Studio album by AC/DC
- Released: 17 February 1975
- Recorded: November 1974
- Studio: Albert (Sydney)
- Genres: Hard rock; blues rock; rock and roll
- Length: 39:51
- Label: Albert
- Producer: Vanda & Young

AC/DC chronology
High Voltage (1975)	T.N.T. (1975)

Singles from High Voltage
- 1. "Love Song (Oh Jene)" / "Baby, Please Don't Go" Released: 3 March 1975

High Voltage is the debut studio album by Australian hard rock band AC/DC, released only in Australia and New Zealand, on 17 February 1975. Their first international release in 1976 would also be named High Voltage, though with a radically different track list.

== Background ==
In November 1973, guitarists Malcolm Young and Angus Young formed AC/DC and recruited bassist Larry Van Kriedt, vocalist Dave Evans, and Colin Burgess, ex-Masters Apprentices drummer. Soon the Young brothers decided that Evans was not a suitable frontman for the group; they felt he was more of a glam rocker like Gary Glitter. The band had recorded only one single with Evans, "Can I Sit Next To You Girl", with "Rockin' in the Parlour" as the B-side. In September 1974, Ronald Belford "Bon" Scott, an experienced vocalist and friend of producer George Young, replaced Dave Evans after friend Vince Lovegrove recommended him. The addition of Scott redefined the band; like the Young brothers, Scott had been born in Scotland before emigrating to Australia in his childhood, and loved rock and roll, especially Little Richard. Scott had played in the Valentines, the Spektors and Fraternity. In a 2010 interview with Mojo's Sylvie Simmons, Angus Young recalled that Scott "moulded the character of AC/DC... Everything became more down to earth and straight ahead. That's when we became a band."

== Recording ==
Vanda & Young produced the album at Albert Studios in Sydney, Australia. George Young was Angus and Malcolm's older brother and also played bass guitar on several songs on the album. Harry Vanda was a bandmate of George's in the Easybeats, and the pair wrote the band's later hits, including their international smash "Friday on My Mind". When George Young heard what his younger siblings were up to, he was quite impressed, telling VH1's Behind the Music in 2000, "All of a sudden the kid brothers were still the kid brothers... but my God, they knew how to play. There was no sort of, 'Do they have it or don't they have it?' It was obvious that they had something." AC/DC were still developing their sound when High Voltage was recorded in November 1974, and singer Bon Scott and the Young brothers were backed by a rhythm section different from the Mark Evans/Phil Rudd combination, which would feature on their next three full-length studio recordings. Rob Bailey and Peter Clack were the band's bassist and drummer, respectively, at the time. Although Murray Engleheart writes in his book AC/DC: Maximum Rock N Roll that bass guitar duties were shared by Malcolm and older brother George, who also played live with the band infrequently, as well as Bailey, Tony Currenti has revealed that he mostly recorded alongside Bailey and that George played bass on "Stick Around", "Love Song" and the song "High Voltage". Clack played drums on "Baby, Please Don't Go", while the rest of the tracks were recorded by Currenti. AC/DC biographer Jesse Fink laments Currenti's lack of recognition, noting that his name "doesn't bob up anywhere on the Australian or international releases of High Voltage, TNT, '74 Jailbreak, Backtracks or any other releases on which his playing may or may not have appeared." Malcolm and Angus traded-off lead guitar parts on "Soul Stripper" and "Show Business," and Malcolm played the solo on "Little Lover." In the book Highway to Hell: The Life and Times of AC/DC Legend Bon Scott, author Clinton Walker quotes Angus Young: "It was actually recorded in ten days in between gigs, working through the night after we came off stage and then through the day. I suppose it was fun at the time, but there was no thought put into it."

== Composition ==
While the songs on High Voltage showcase a glam rock influence that the band would soon discard in favour of a more riff-based hard rock sound, the foundation for the band's songwriting structures are clearly evident. As Angus told Benjamin Smith of VH1 in 2014, "I think the '60s was a great time for music, especially for rock and roll. It was the era of the Beatles, of the Stones, and then later on the Who and Led Zeppelin. But at one point in the '70s it just kind of became... mellow. When Malcolm put the band together, it was obvious what was missing at the time: another great rock band. So it was basically a reaction to that, because the music at that point had just turned into that soft, melodic kind of period, and that seemed to be all over the world. For us, it was a pretty easy choice, especially because Malcolm and myself – we’re two guitarists – so from the get-go, it was going to be a guitar band." The Young brothers and Scott wrote six of its eight songs, with "Soul Stripper" credited to the Young brothers alone. "Soul Stripper" evolved from an unrecorded song called "Sunset Strip", also written by Malcolm and Dave Evans. "Soul Stripper" is similar in theme and structure to "Squealer," a song included on Dirty Deeds Done Dirt Cheap in 1976. "Baby, Please Don't Go" is a cover version of a Big Joe Williams song and was chosen as the LP's first single, leading to the group's third appearance on Australia's Countdown music program. The band's appearance included the now-legendary live performance of "Baby, Please Don't Go" featuring Scott dressed as a blonde schoolgirl. "Love Song" evolved from an unrecorded song called "Fell in Love", also written by Malcolm and Dave Evans. This earlier version had different lyrics, and Scott added the finished lyrics heard on the album. In 1994, Bon Scott biographer Clinton Walker speculated that the uncharacteristically maudlin lyric to "Love Song" was likely a leftover from Scott's previous band Fraternity. "Love Song" was released as the album's first single (under the title "Love Song (Oh Jene)") and was backed with "Baby, Please Don't Go", but radio preferred the flip. "She's Got Balls" (about Scott's ex-wife Irene) was the first song that Scott and the Young brothers put together, while "Little Lover" had been a song Malcolm had been tinkering with since he was about 14 and had been originally titled "Front Row Fantasies" (Scott, who wrote the song about Angus, mentions glam rock star Gary Glitter by name in the song).

== Releases ==
High Voltage was originally released on Albert Productions only in Australia and New Zealand, and has never been reissued by another label in this format. The international version of High Voltage, which was issued on Atlantic Records in 1976, has a different cover art and track listing, with only "She's Got Balls" and "Little Lover" appearing overseas. "Baby Please Don't Go", "Soul Stripper", "You Ain't Got a Hold on Me" and "Show Business" were later released on '74 Jailbreak in 1984. "Stick Around" (about Scott's inability to hold onto a lover for more than one night) and "Love Song" have been released on Backtracks in 2009. The title and artwork were the suggestion of Chris Gilbey of Albert Productions. In the 1994 Scott biography Highway to Hell, Gilbey explains that he came up with the concept of "an electricity substation with a dog pissing against it. It's so tame now, but back then we thought it was pretty revolutionary."

Most of the original LP and Cassette releases contain an error to the writing credits for "Baby, Please Don't Go" with credit going to Broonzy (Big Bill Broonzy). Broonzy recorded a cover of the song in 1952, but it was in fact "Big" Joe Williams who wrote the song in 1935. The error was corrected on all CD releases.

In 2025, High Voltage and TNT were released in those formats internationally for the first time, as merch on the band's Power Up Tour.

== Reception ==
Professional ratings
Review scores
Source	Rating
AllMusic	3.5/5 stars

AllMusic deems this version of AC/DC "a very young band who were still coming into their own at the time, and that process of self-discovery is what makes the original version of High Voltage both the most inconsistent and unique of all the Bon Scott albums."

== Track listing ==
All tracks are written by Angus Young, Malcolm Young and Bon Scott except where noted.

Side one
No.	Title	Writer(s)	Length
1.	"Baby, Please Don't Go"	Big Joe Williams	4:50
2.	"She's Got Balls"		4:52
3.	"Little Lover"		5:40
4.	"Stick Around"		4:39

Side two
No.	Title	Writer(s)	Length
5.	"Soul Stripper"	A. Young; M. Young	6:25
6.	"You Ain't Got a Hold on Me"		3:31
7.	"Love Song (Oh Jene)"		5:14
8.	"Show Business"		4:46
Total length:			39:51

Notes

- "Baby Please Don't Go", "Soul Stripper", "You Ain't Got a Hold on Me" and "Show Business" were later included on the international release of '74 Jailbreak.
- "She's Got Balls" and "Little Lover" were later included on the international version of High Voltage.
- "Stick Around" and "Love Song" were never officially released internationally in album form. They were eventually included in the 2009 boxed set Backtracks.

== Personnel ==
AC/DC

- Bon Scott – lead vocals
- Angus Young – lead guitar, rhythm guitar
- Malcolm Young – rhythm guitar, backing vocals, lead guitar (3, 5–6, 8)
- Rob Bailey – bass guitar (1–3, 5–6, 8)
- Peter Clack – drums (1)

Session musicians and production

- George Young – production, bass guitar (4, 7) backing vocals
- Harry Vanda – production, backing vocals
- Tony Currenti – drums (2–8)
- Richard Ford – artwork

== Charts ==
Chart (1975)	Peak position
Australian Albums (Kent Music Report)	14

== Certifications ==
Region	Certification	Certified units/sales
Australia (ARIA)	5× Platinum	350,000^{^}
^{^} Shipments figures based on certification alone.
