= Can I Sit Next to You, Girl =

1974 single by AC/DC

Single by AC/DC
- B-side: "Rockin' in the Parlour"
- Released: 22 July 1974
- Recorded: January – February 1974
- Studio: EMI (Sydney)
- Genre: Hard rock; glam rock
- Length: 3:05
- Label: Albert
- Songwriters: Malcolm Young; Angus Young
- Producers: Harry Vanda; George Young

AC/DC singles chronology
"Can I Sit Next to You, Girl" (1974)	"Baby, Please Don't Go" (1975)

"Can I Sit Next to You, Girl" is the debut single by Australian hard rock band AC/DC, issued on 22 July 1974. On 26 August 1974, the song peaked at number 50 in Australia. This version has lead vocals performed by Dave Evans prior to his being replaced by Bon Scott, as well as drums by ex-Masters Apprentices member Colin Burgess, and bass guitar by ex-The Easybeats member George Young (older brother of band cofounders Malcolm Young & Angus Young; co-producer). Originally, AC/DC's first bassist, Larry Van Kriedt, played the bass parts, but George recorded his own over them later. In 1975, after Scott joined, the group re-arranged and re-recorded the song as the seventh track on their Australia-only album T.N.T., released in December 1975, and as the sixth track on the international version of High Voltage, released in May 1976. The title of this version of the song removed the comma, becoming "Can I Sit Next to You Girl".

== Recordings ==
Written by Malcolm and Angus Young, it was AC/DC's first original song. The Evans version was released as a single in Australia, and the band performed the song with Evans on the TV show Countdown. The musical arrangement of Evans' version is different from Scott's and it has never been officially released outside Australia (though it is now widely available on the internet, on sites like YouTube.)

== Video ==
The song's performance on The Last Picture Show was made into a music video, released only in Australia in 1974. Peter Clack (drums) and Rob Bailey (bass) appeared in the video, even though they were not featured on the recording. While Angus sports his soon-to-be-iconic schoolboy uniform in the video, the rest of the band present a Glam rock visual image with satins and brightly coloured costumes more reminiscent of T. Rex than of later heavy rock imagery.

== Personnel ==
=== "Can I Sit Next to You, Girl" (1974) ===
- Dave Evans – lead vocals
- Angus Young – lead guitar
- Malcolm Young – rhythm guitar, backing vocals
- George Young – bass guitar, production, backing vocals
- Colin Burgess – drums

=== "Can I Sit Next to You Girl" (1975) ===
- Bon Scott – lead vocals
- Angus Young – lead guitar
- Malcolm Young – rhythm guitar, backing vocals
- Mark Evans – bass guitar
- Phil Rudd – drums

== Charts ==
Chart (1974)	Peak position
Australian (Kent Music Report)	50
