= Larry Van Kriedt =

American-born Australian jazz musician (born 1954)

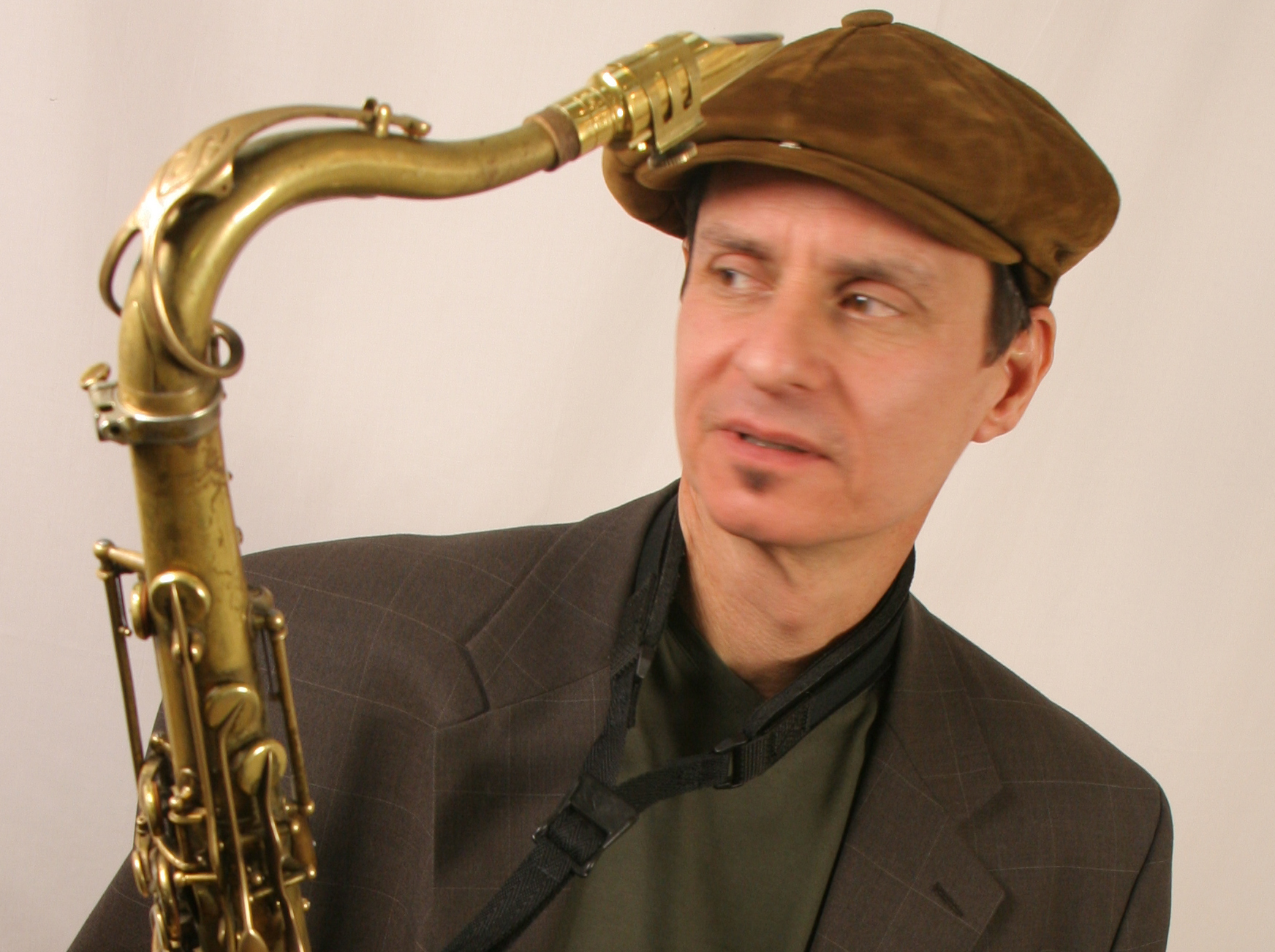
- Van Kriedt in 2006

Background information
- Born: Lawrence Alton Van Kriedt; 4 July 1954 (age 72); San Francisco, California, U.S.
- Genres: Jazz, rock
- Occupations: Musician, songwriter
- Instruments: Saxophone, bass guitar, guitar, vocals
- Years active: 1963—present
- Formerly of: AC/DC; Non Stop Dancers; Afram; The LPs
- Website: twitter.com/LarryVanKriedt

Lawrence Alton Van Kriedt (born 4 July 1954) is an American-Australian jazz musician. He is known for being the original bassist for the hard rock band AC/DC from November 1973. He joined Malcolm Young (rhythm guitar), Angus Young (lead guitar), Dave Evans (lead vocals) and Colin Burgess (drums). Van Kriedt was replaced in February 1974. Van Kriedt also plays saxophone and guitar, and sings.

== Early life ==
Lawrence Alton Van Kriedt, was born on 4 July 1954 to David Norman (1922–1994) and Margot Joan Van Kriedt (née MacNeil, 1927–2019) in San Francisco and grew up as the second eldest of four children. His father was a jazz musician who composed, arranged, played and recorded with Dave Brubeck, Paul Desmond, and Stan Kenton.

Van Kriedt's life has been centred on music, particularly jazz. He began playing the double bass at age 9, the guitar at 12, and added saxophone and vocals at 15. He studied jazz, harmony, composition, and musical arrangement with his father. In August 1969, at age 15, the Van Kriedt family emigrated to Sydney, New South Wales via SS Oriana. He associated with Angus and his older brother, Malcolm Young. Van Kriedt is described as being an accomplished jazz-influenced guitarist during this period.

== AC/DC ==
In November 1973 he was asked to join a new rock band, AC/DC by Malcolm Young. Shortly after, lead singer Dave Evans, drummer Colin Burgess and guitarist Angus Young joined. On 31 December 1973 the band performed their first live show. Four months later the band recorded the single "Can I Sit Next to You, Girl", although shortly afterwards Van Kriedt was replaced, and his bass lines were re-recorded by George Young (one of the older brothers of Malcolm and Angus). After this, he was replaced by Neil Smith. AC/DC employed a succession of bass players over the following months.

In January 1975 after Rob Bailey was fired, Paul Matters joined the group as bassist for live shows but his tenure was short-lived, being replaced by Mark Evans in March 1975. Until Axl Rose joined as a guest vocalist in 2016, Van Kriedt had been the only member in the group's history to be born in the US.

== Other bands ==
Van Kriedt created his own band called Non Stop Dancers with Kevin Jones (guitar, vocals), Jane Stewart (keyboards), Karen Steains (bass), and Brett Van Kriedt (drums). They released one full-length album, Surprise Surprise, in 1984.

== Personal life ==
From 1997 to 1999, he lived in Morocco, working there as a musician with his band Afram doing radio, television and concerts such as the first Gnawa Festival in Essaouira in 1998, and raising money for the charity, B.A.Y.T.I. After leaving Morocco he travelled the world busking, that is, playing jazz on the street from London to Provence to Sydney. This was when he started making backing tracks of jazz standards.

In 2002, Van Kriedt pioneered the first online downloadable jazz playalong backing track e-business, Jazzbacks.com.

In 2007, he worked with Paul Agbakoba in The LPs.
