= Paul Matters =

Australian musician (1952–2020)

- Born: 14 October 1952; Toronto, New South Wales, Australia
- Died: 14 October 2020 (aged 68) Toronto, New South Wales, Australia
- Genres: Rock
- Occupation: Musician
- Instrument: Bass guitar
- Years active: 1968–1975
- Formerly of: AC/DC, Armageddon

Paul Matters (14 October 1952 – 14 October 2020) was a bassist for the Australian rock band AC/DC in 1975, joining the group after the recording of their debut album High Voltage. He was fired by lead singer Bon Scott several weeks after joining the group and replaced by Mark Evans.

== Career ==
Born in Toronto, New South Wales, Matters was the bassist of Newcastle band Armageddon until parting ways with the group in 1974 over what drummer Les Gully described to AC/DC biographer Jesse Fink as "musical differences". Matters was hired by AC/DC and performed live on tour in Melbourne, Adelaide, and Sydney, but had not taken part in the recording of the group's debut album, which was recorded before his recruitment, and was then sacked from the group.

According to Gully, Matters "didn't fit the values of the Young [brothers] oligarchy. ... He didn't really fit, had strong opinions and sensitivity, and played just what he liked." Matters only gave one press interview following his sacking by AC/DC in 1975, to Fink for the book Bon: The Last Highway, in which he claimed that he was "a bit lazy" and "a bit cranky" but did not have enough money to eat: "I didn't have any food in my stomach. They [management] didn't give us any money to buy food or anything."

Matters quit music after his departure from AC/DC in 1975. He lived on a disability pension for the rest of his life.

== Death ==
Matters died of heart disease in his hometown of Toronto on 14 October 2020, his 68th birthday.
