= Jailbreak (AC/DC song) =

1976 single by AC/DC

- Cover of the 1980 UK single reissue

Single by AC/DC

from the album Dirty Deeds Done Dirt Cheap and the EP '74 Jailbreak
- B-side: "Fling Thing" (Aus and UK); "Show Business" (US)
- Released: 14 June 1976
- Recorded: January 1976
- Studio: Albert (Sydney)
- Length: 4:36
- Label: Albert
- Songwriters: Angus Young; Malcolm Young; Bon Scott
- Producer: Vanda & Young

AC/DC singles chronology
"T.N.T." (1976)	"Jailbreak" (1976)	"Dirty Deeds Done Dirt Cheap" (1976)

"Jailbreak" is a song by Australian hard rock band AC/DC. It is the ninth and final track of their third Australian album Dirty Deeds Done Dirt Cheap, released in September 1976. The song was not released in North America until 1984. It was written by Angus Young, Malcolm Young, and Bon Scott.

== Releases ==
It was first released as a single in Australia and the UK in mid-1976, with the non-album track "Fling Thing" as its B-side. The single was re-issued in the UK in 1980 with a picture sleeve.

As "Jailbreak" was only included on the Australian version of Dirty Deeds Done Dirt Cheap, and not on its international counterpart, it did not see a release in the United States, Canada, and Japan until October 1984 as part of the international '74 Jailbreak EP. And as a US single, with "Show Business" as its B-side.

== Live recordings ==
"Jailbreak" was included on the 1992 AC/DC live album Live: 2 CD Collector's Edition, sung by Scott's replacement Brian Johnson. This live recording also features extended guitar solos by Angus Young. Another version, recorded in Dallas in 1985, also sung by Johnson, was included on the 12" version of the "Shake Your Foundations" single. The full 13:22 version was later included in the 2009 Backtracks compilation album.

The version from the show featured on Live at Donington is included in the AC/DC Live: Rock Band Track Pack.

== Video ==
The music video for "Jailbreak" was filmed in March 1976 for the Australian music program Countdown. Filming was directed by Paul Drane in a quarry in the Melbourne suburb of Albion, near Sunshine. The video featured the band's then-current lineup playing the song. Angus Young is dressed in what he later described as "little convict pajamas", Bon Scott and Phil Rudd are dressed in blue prisoner uniform covered with typical Australian broad arrow, and Malcolm Young and Mark Evans are dressed as guards.

Additionally, the band acts out the section of the song that details the protagonist's escape from prison. The film shows the prisoners (Scott, Angus and Rudd) doing hard labour under watch of the prison guards (Malcolm and Evans). Later, the prisoners manage to blow open the gates to the prison. Rudd and Angus are able to escape, but Scott is shot in the back by the guards as he attempts to do the same. The video is dubbed with the studio track from the Dirty Deeds Done Dirt Cheap album.

"Jailbreak" is one of the first videos to make use of explosives and fake blood. Drane is quoted as saying, "We didn't really know how much [explosive] we were going to need to make the doors fly open, and I had a couple of guys from props with sticks, trying to push the doors apart, so the hinges are not really there...It was the first time we'd had access to anything like this, these exploding blood packs."

This video was featured on AC/DC's Family Jewels DVD. An alternate video, which features the band simply playing on a stage, was also filmed which is available in the Backtracks box set.

== Personnel ==
- Bon Scott – lead vocals
- Angus Young – lead guitar
- Malcolm Young – rhythm guitar, backing vocals
- Mark Evans – bass guitar
- Phil Rudd – drums

== Charts ==
=== Weekly charts ===
Weekly chart performance for "Jailbreak"
Chart (1976)	Peak position
Australian (Kent Music Report)	10

=== Year-end charts ===
Year-end chart performance for "Jailbreak"
Chart (1976)	Position
Australia (Kent Music Report)	63
