= Darwin 1942 (film) =

- Written by: Margaret Drane; Paul Drane; Alan Hopgood
- Directed by: Paul Drane
- Starring: John Stanton
- Country of origin: Australia
- Original language: English

Production
- Producers: Margaret Drane; Paul Drane
- Running time: 90 minutes
- Production company: Paul Drane Productions

Original release
- Release: 1986

Darwin 1942 is a 1986 Australian TV movie about the bombing of Darwin.
