= Rabbit (Australian band) =

Australian rock band

- Also known as: The Cherries; The Heroes
- Origin: Newcastle, New South Wales, Australia
- Genres: Glam rock; hard rock
- Years active: 1973–1977
- Label: CBS
- Past members: Jim Porteus; Phil Screen; Mark Tinson; Greg Douglas; Dave Evans; David Hinds; Barry Lytten

Rabbit (originally, The Cherries) were an Australian glam rock band from Newcastle, who formed in 1973 by Jim Porteus on bass guitar, Phil Screen on drums and Mark Tinson on guitar and vocals. In October 1974 they were joined by Dave Evans (ex-AC/DC) on lead vocals. The group relocated to Sydney and released two albums, Rabbit (1975) and Too Much Rock n Roll (1976), before disbanding in late 1977. Porteus, Screen and Tinson returned to Newcastle where they formed a hard rock band, Heroes, with Peter de Jong on guitar and vocals. They issued a self-titled album in October 1980 and disbanded in 1982.

== History ==
The Cherries were formed in 1973 in Newcastle as a glam rock band by Jim Porteus on bass guitar, Phil Screen on drums and Mark Tinson on lead guitar and vocals. They were renamed as Rabbit and played a mixture of originals and cover versions by Alice Cooper, the Who and the Sweet. Vocalist Greg Douglas joined early in 1974 and was replaced in October of that year by Dave Evans, the founding singer from hard rockers, AC/DC. Evans had seen the group performing "at Chequers nightclub in Sydney and was impressed with their confronting stage presence."

According to Australian musicologist Ian McFarlane, Rabbit played "a thumping brand of commercial glam-boogie (somewhere between US groups like Kiss and Brownsville Station) and the members decked themselves out in bare-chested silk blouses, spandex leggings and stack-heeled boots... The climax of the band's shows came with [Screen's] spectacular fire-breathing displays." The group relocated to Sydney, where they signed with CBS Records Australia. Rabbit's debut single, "Lady La Di Da", was a cover version of a track by a Swedish group, New Quidesty Blaise (a.k.a. NQB), which was written by that band's guitarist-vocalist, Elisabeth Åhlander. A music video was supplied to promote the track. Its B-side, "Marvel Man", was co-written by Evans and Tinson.

They followed with their self-titled debut album in 1975. Their second single, "Running Bear", appeared in December of that year. David Hinds (ex-Marshall Brothers) joined the line-up on lead guitar in 1976. The band were described as frenetic and violently hedonistic. Ahead of their second album, Too Much Rock n Roll (October 1976), they issued two more singles, "Wildfire" (May) and the title track (August) – both appeared on the top 100 of the Kent Music Report singles chart. The album reached the top 60 on the Kent Music Report albums chart.

Tinson and Screen left the band early in 1977; Barry Lytten joined as drummer and Tinson was not replaced. A cover version of Paul Revere & the Raiders' 1969 hit "Let Me" was released by Rabbit as a single in July 1977. Evans left the group in October and soon after Rabbit disbanded. Porteus, Screen and Tinson formed a hard rock group, Heroes, back in Newcastle, which released their self-titled album in October 1980; they broke up in 1982. Hinds had joined a Sydney-based hard rock group, Finch in 1977. After Heroes had split, Screen and Tinson both joined Swanee and then were members of the Tex Pistols. Evans was a member of numerous other bands: Dave Evans and the Line-Ups, Hot Cockerel, David Evans and Thunder Downunder, and Surprise Party.

== Former members ==
- Jim Porteus – bass guitar (1973–77)
- Phil Screen – drums, percussion (1973–77)
- Mark Tinson – lead and rhythm guitar, vocals (1973–77)
- Greg Douglas – lead vocals (1973–74)
- Dave Evans – lead vocals (1974–77)
- David Hinds – lead guitar (1976–77)
- Barry Lytten – drums (1977)

== Discography ==
=== Studio albums ===
List of albums, with Australian chart positions
| Title | Album details | Peak chart positions |
| Title | Album details | AUS |
|---|---|---|
| Rabbit | Released: 1975; Format: LP; Label: CBS Records Australia (SBP 234748) | - |
| Too Much Rock n Roll | Released: 1976; Format: LP; Label: CBS Records Australia (SBP 234866) | 53 |

=== Singles ===
List of singles, with Australian chart positions
| Year | Title | Peak chart positions | Album |
| Year | Title | AUS | Album |
|---|---|---|---|
| 1974 | "Lady La Di Da"/"Marvel Man" | - | Rabbit |
| 1975 | "Running Bear"/"Lets Go Rockin' Rollin' Tonight" | - | Rabbit |
| 1976 | "Wildfire"/"Bad Girls" | 86 | Too Much Rock 'n' Roll |
| 1976 | "Too Much Rock n Roll"/"Shake That Thing" | 64 | Too Much Rock 'n' Roll |
| 1977 | "Let Me"/"Kiss Me Goodnight" | - | Non-album single |
