= Peter Clack =

Australian drummer

- Born: 19 April 1953 (age 73); Australia
- Genres: Rock
- Occupations: Musician, songwriter
- Instrument: Drums
- Years active: Late 1960s–current

Peter Clack is an Australian drummer who was an early member of hard rock band AC/DC. In April 1974 he joined Malcolm Young (rhythm guitar), Angus Young (lead guitar), Dave Evans (lead vocals) and Rob Bailey (bass guitar). He appears in early video footage of AC/DC, the Last Picture Show Theatre video of "Can I Sit Next to You, Girl". Clack was a member of the band during the recording of their debut album High Voltage but most of the drum parts were recorded by session man Tony Currenti. Clack continued with AC/DC until January 1975 when he was sacked along with Bailey, Clack's permanent replacement was Phil Rudd.

Prior to joining AC/DC, Clack had played with Bailey in Flake. Peter was the drummer of the Allan Hessey Big Band. As of November 2011, he played with Melbourne-based band Raw Sylke.
