= Tony Currenti =

Australian drummer of Italian descent

Antonino Currenti
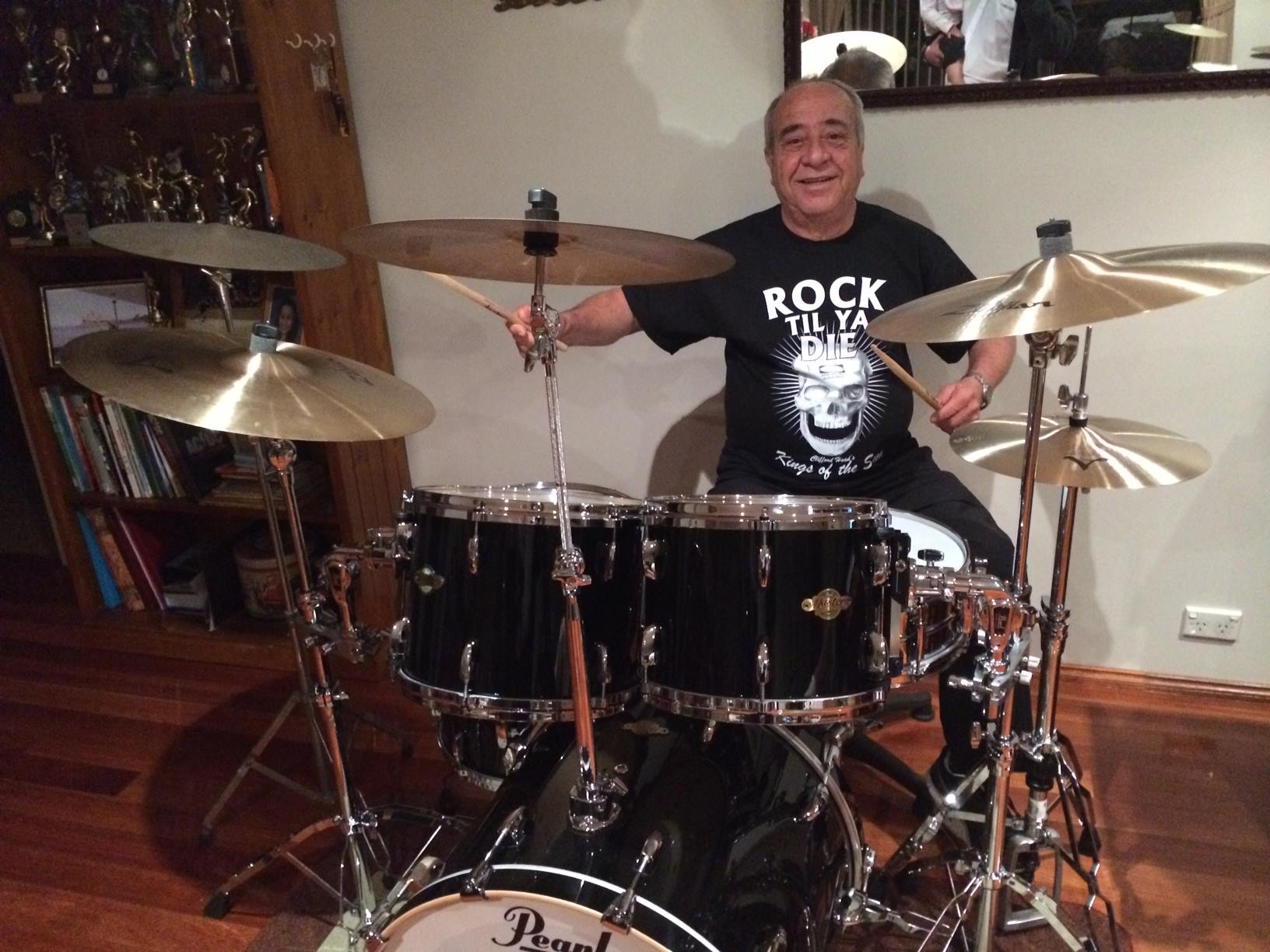
- Currenti in May 2014

Background information
- Born: 26 June 1951 (age 75); Fiumefreddo di Sicilia, Catania, Italy
- Origin: Sydney
- Genres: Australian rock; hard rock; rock 'n' roll
- Occupation: Musician
- Instrument: Drums
- Years active: 1969–77; 2014–present
- Labels: EMI; Alberts

Antonino "Tony" Currenti (born 26 June 1951) is an Australian rock drummer of Italian descent, best known as a session drummer for Australian hard rock band AC/DC (1975 debut album High Voltage, the "High Voltage" single, and 1984 album '74 Jailbreak) and various Vanda & Young projects – including Stevie Wright (international hit "Evie") and John Paul Young (hit singles "Yesterday's Hero" and "I Hate the Music").

== Early life ==
Currenti was born on 26 June 1951 on the Italian island of Sicily. He migrated to Australia on SS Galileo Galilei in August 1967 with his parents, brother and sister at the age of 16, with no knowledge of English. After two years, his parents got homesick and went back to Italy. Currenti, at that time 18 years old, played in a band around Sydney and thought he had a future in music, so he decided to stay.

When Currenti was five years old, his dad bought him a piano accordion. He learnt to play drums by bashing his accordion and whatever chairs he could find with spoons. Currenti bought his first set of drums after he got his first pay packet in Australia. It was a second-hand Premier drum kit. Currenti later purchased a white Ludwig drum kit with which he did all the session work in the 70s.

== Early career ==
=== First bands ===
In 1968, while walking down King St. in Newtown, Currenti noticed a band rehearsing in a hall near a church. They had no drummer, so he "played drums" on the chairs and thereafter was asked to join the band. After a few weeks of playing in the church band, Currenti joined another band, Tin Soldiers, which performed on the TV program New Faces. After the performance on New Faces, guitarist Norm Group and Currenti formed a new band called Inheritance.

=== Inheritance and the first recording contract ===
After working in and around Sydney (they scored a residence at The Groove Room, which lasted for circa 12 months), record label EMI signed Inheritance to a recording contract. In 1969, Inheritance recorded their first single called "Kookie".

The band was later joined by two female musicians and changed their name to Grapevine, which had a six-month residence at Jonathan's nightclub in Sydney. After that residency ended, the two female members left the band, and the band was forced to change its name after they found out another group had registered it. Around 1971, the band met with Harry Vanda and George Young who suggested the band's handsome Greek-born singer assume the name "Jackie Christian".

In 1972, they recorded a cover version of The Who's "Join Together", which was released as Grapevine featuring Jackie Christian with B-side called "That's Life".

=== Jackie Christian & Flight ===
The band adopted the new name Jackie Christian & Flight. The first single, recorded under the Jackie Christian handle, was "Rosy" (with "You Chose a Fine Time" as a B-side) and released in 1972. In 1974, the band released two songs penned and produced by Vanda & Young, namely "Love" and "The Last Time I Go to Baltimore". "Love" was chosen as an A-side and a single was released on the Alberts label. Polydor released it under the name Jackie Christian & Target in Canada.

Flight also recorded another Vanda & Young song called "Love Fever", but the producers did not like Jackie Christian's vocals and eventually gave the song to Ray Burgess, who recorded verses over Jackie Christian & Flight's track (which included backing vocals). The single was released by Burgess in July 1975 and reached the Australian Kent Music Report top 30.

== Session work for Vanda & Young ==
=== AC/DC ===
It was during this time in early 1974 that George Young approached Currenti and asked if he would record with his two younger brothers in a band called AC/DC. The album was called High Voltage and Tony played drums on all tracks but one ("Baby, Please Don't Go" was recorded by Peter Clack), including the later single "High Voltage" (which appeared on the T.N.T. album and the international release of High Voltage). After recording the album, Currenti was asked to join the group but declined for two reasons; one, Currenti was loyal to his current band Jackie Christian & Flight, and two, he was an Italian citizen with an Italian passport which did not allow him to tour freely in England or Europe with the band without being called up for military service.

=== Stevie Wright ===
Several months later, Jackie Christian & Flight split up and Currenti stayed on with Vanda & Young as a session musician, which included working with Stevie Wright on an album called Black Eyed Bruiser in 1975 (Tony was drummer on all but two tracks) and even his international number one hit "Evie" (specifically Part Three "I'm Losing You") released the previous year.

=== John Paul Young ===
For the following 12 to 18 months, Currenti worked for bands such as The 69ers and a little known band called Winter. He recorded tracks for John Paul Young including hit singles "Yesterday's Hero" (1975) and "I Hate the Music" (1976). It has been rumoured he played on Young's biggest hit, "Love Is In The Air", though this has not been confirmed or denied by Currenti.

=== Compilations ===
"Love" by Jackie Christian & Flight features on two compilations: The Vanda & Young Story Volume 1 (Albert Productions/Drum, 1976) and Their Music Goes 'Round Our Heads (Columbia, 1992). Currenti's drumming on Ray Burgess's "Love Fever" also appears on the latter album as well as "Whopper" (Polydor, 1976). Currenti's drumming on John Paul Young's "Yesterday's Hero" appears on the compilation Sharpies: 14 Aggro Aussie Anthems From 1972 To 1979 (Sharps Rock Records, 2013).

=== Other Recordings ===
Currenti has made guest appearances on albums by Stinger (Germany) and Simon Chainsaw (Australia).

== Life outside the music business ==
In early 1979, after getting married, Currenti decided to leave the music industry and open his own pizzeria in Hurlstone Park, Sydney. He now runs Tonino's Penshurst Pizzeria in Penshurst, Sydney.

Currenti was rediscovered by Australian writer Jesse Fink who interviewed him for his book The Youngs: The Brothers Who Built AC/DC. Following the release of the book in 2013, Currenti started playing the drums again and gained popularity among AC/DC fans. Currenti completed a number of tours of the UK and Europe with various AC/DC tribute bands and received civic honours in his hometown of Fiumefreddo di Sicilia in Sicily. Currenti typically plays all the songs he recorded with AC/DC but also Bon Scott-era songs such as "Gimme a Bullet", "Highway to Hell" and "It's a Long Way to the Top".

In May 2016, Currenti was a special guest for the unveiling of a fan-funded statue of Bon Scott at the 10th Annual Bonfest in Kirriemuir, Scotland, alongside former AC/DC bassist Mark Evans and Bon Scott friend and author Mary Renshaw. Currenti had known Scott before he joined AC/DC.

In July 2015, he announced on his Facebook page a maiden tour of Italy with tribute band Overdose74. In Italy, he also performed with tribute bands Bon Scott Experience, Black Ice and Back In Hell. While in Europe, Currenti visited Germany and made a guest appearance on the album Disadvantaged by Stinger. Currenti was a special guest performer in the Bon But Not Forgotten series of concerts in Sydney and Melbourne in July 2017 to celebrate the 71st birthday of Bon Scott. The 2017 touring show, a tribute to Bon Scott, featured Currenti, James Morley, Mark Evans, Filippo Olivieri, Skenie and Simon Wright. Currenti, Morley and Wright backed up for the 2018 reprise but Evans, Olivieri and Skenie did not. Their places were taken by other musicians.

In 2021, Currenti stepped back from touring commitments due to pandemic travel restrictions but continues to play concerts in Sydney, Australia. He played a farewell tour in the UK in 2023.
