= Paul Drane =

Australian television producer-director

Paul Drane is an Australian television producer-director. He was initially known as studio director of the Australian TV pop show Countdown from 1975 to 1977. During this period, he directed several music videos (promotional film clips) made especially for Countdown, including the original clips for the AC/DC hits "It's a Long Way to the Top" and "Jailbreak".

His award-winning Countdown video for Supernaut's "I Like It Both Ways" gave viewers an early taste of visual effects in music videos. These were achieved without the benefit of (yet to be invented) high-end CGI, but improvised with use of video feed-back by pointing the cameras at monitors to create looping, distortion effects. With its blend of live action and 2D visual imagery, the award-winning video was an early glimpse of the rapid advances that lay ahead.

In addition to the Countdown live performances, Drane independently produced and directed many Australian music videos during the 70s (Skyhooks, John Paul Young, AC/DC, Cold Chisel, Little River Band, Marcia Hines) and full concerts by local and international artists.

In 1978 he produced and directed the independent music documentary, 'Australian Music to the World', based on the original radio series by Vince Lovegrove. Filmed worldwide, the program featured interviews and performances by artists including AC/DC (live in Atlanta), Peter Allen, Helen Reddy and the Little River Band.

The following year Drane produced and directed the documentary special "The Prophecies of Nostradamus" for Australian Seven television network. Hosted by actor, John Waters, the program set a ratings record, with unprecedented reaction the following day, prompting the network to schedule a repeat run two weeks later.

This program was sold to Warner Bros. in the United States in 1980. Repackaged for worldwide release, it was narrated by Orson Welles and titled The Man Who Saw Tomorrow.

Throughout his lengthy career Paul Drane has maintained his passion for music, and in particular live music on television. This has given rise to classic televised concerts from artists including Split Enz, INXS, and Paul Kelly, and iconic musical moments such as Stevie Wright's "Evie" at the Sydney Opera House.

Since 2005, Drane has directed RocKwiz for SBS One and continues to make music videos and television content.

== Select Credits ==
- Countdown (1975–77)
- Australian Music to the World (1978)
- The Prophecies of Nostradamus (1979)
- Nightmoves live concerts
- Concert of the Decade
- Marcia Hines Music
- Royal Command Performance for HRH Prince Charles
- Darwin 1942 (1986)
- Under the Southern Cross
- Crowded House Live at the State Theatre
- INXS - A Simple Truth (Concert for the Kurds)
- RocKwiz (2005 - ongoing)
- Music videos:
