= Rob Bailey (musician) =

Australian musician

- Born: 1953 (age 72–73); Australia
- Genre: Rock
- Occupations: Musician, singer, songwriter
- Instrument: Bass guitar
- Years active: 1968–present
- Formerly of: AC/DC; Flake; Acid Road; Natural Gas; Rudy and the Aardvarks; Company of Men

Rob Bailey is an Australian musician who was an early bassist with the hard rock band AC/DC. He joined the group in April 1974, with Malcolm Young (rhythm guitar), Angus Young (lead guitar), Dave Evans (lead vocals) and Peter Clack (drums). Bailey left in January 1975.

== Career ==
Bailey played bass guitar in Flake in 1973, Acid Road, Rudy and the Aardvarks, and Natural Gas. The latter group supported The Rolling Stones' Australian tour in 1972 and 1973.

From April 1974 until January 1975, Bailey was a regular member of the Australian hard rock band AC/DC's rhythm section. He appeared in early video footage of AC/DC, the Last Picture Show Theatre video of "Can I Sit Next To You Girl". In August 1974, AC/DC, with Bailey, supported Lou Reed on his Rock'n'Roll Animal tour of Australia. Bailey was a band member during the recording of their debut album and while it is considered that he played on the album High Voltage (released in February 1975), the credit for bass guitar on the album was given to George Young. After Bailey's departure, AC/DC did not have a regular bass guitarist until Mark Evans in March 1975; during that time the position was filled variously by Larry Van Kriedt, Malcolm Young, his older brother George Young, and occasionally by Paul Matters.

Bailey has performed with Wayne Green and Brett Keyser (ex-Innocent Bystanders) as Company of Men in Western Australia, supported by The Dingoes. Robert Bailey has 3 daughters, Nadine, Claire, and Laura. Laura, born in 1991, also plays bass guitar.
