= Dave Evans (singer) =

Welsh-Australian singer (born 1953)

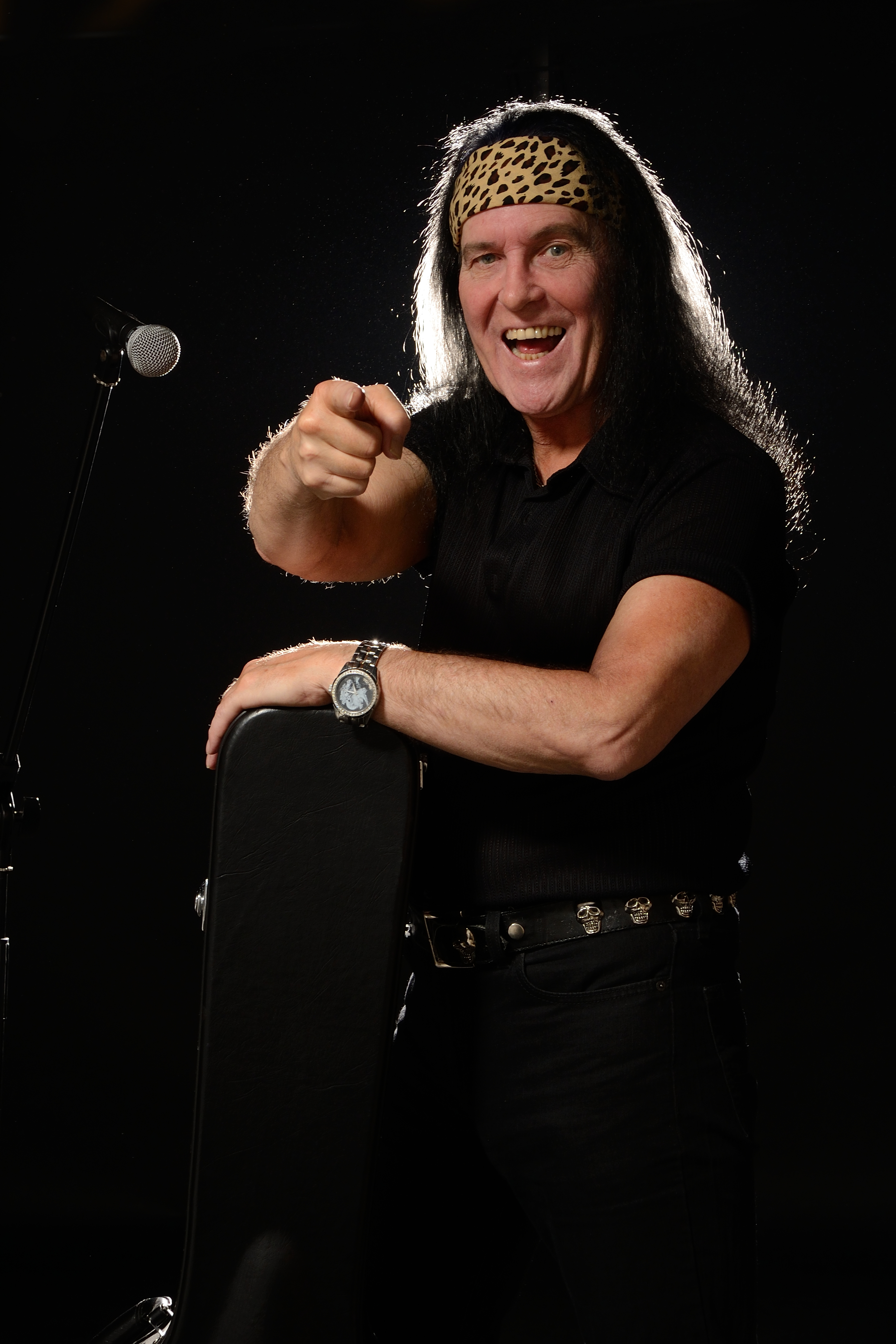

Background information
- Born: July 20, 1953 (age 73); Carmarthen, Wales
- Genres: Rock, hard rock
- Occupation: Singer
- Years active: 1973–present
- Formerly of: AC/DC; Rabbit; The Badasses; The Hot Cockerels; Thunder Down Under; The Apprentices

Dave Evans (born July 20, 1953) is a Welsh-born Australian singer. He was the original lead singer for the Australian hard rock band AC/DC in 1973–1974 and sang on their debut single shortly before being replaced by Bon Scott. Evans then went on to join the band Rabbit, who were active into the early 1980s. He resumed a solo career shortly after the year 2000.

== Early life ==
Evans was born in the Welsh town of Carmarthen, and his family moved to Australia when he was five years old. They settled in the Queensland city of Townsville, and later moved to Charters Towers, where he formed his first band at the age of seventeen. He later moved to Sydney.

== AC/DC ==
Evans was one of several members of AC/DC before the band matured and began playing all-original music, along with Colin Burgess and Larry Van Kriedt. He was a member of the band from its inception in November 1973 until September 1974 before officially being replaced by Bon Scott in October 1974. During his time with AC/DC, Evans recorded one single, a Young/Young composition ("Can I Sit Next to You, Girl"/ "Rocking in the Parlour") which was released in Australia and New Zealand. A low-budget promotional video for the single was also shot. It peaked nationally at number 50 on the Aria (Kent) charts. The song was later re-recorded with Bon Scott.

The band replaced Evans with Scott while changing their sound from glam rock to harder blues rock. Evans has cited jealousy and a physical altercation with the manager during a heavy national tour as the reason for his dismissal, and has also said in interviews that the early history of AC/DC is unjustly ignored.

Former AC/DC manager Michael Browning wrote in his memoir Dog Eat Dog of Evans: "No disrespect to Dave, but they wouldn't have made it with him as singer. He could sing OK, but he didn't have the character Bon brought into the band. The character, the sense of humour, the swagger. They were never going to go as far as they went with Dave out front. Bon was the real deal."

== After AC/DC ==
After AC/DC, Evans joined Newcastle (New South Wales) band Rabbit, replacing original singer Greg Douglas. Rabbit released six singles and two albums between 1975 and 1977 with the second album, Too Much Rock N Roll, released in Europe and Japan. Evans left Rabbit in October 1977. His other bands included "Dave Evans & Hot Cockerel" and "Dave Evans Thunder Down Under", which released one self-titled album through Reaction Records.

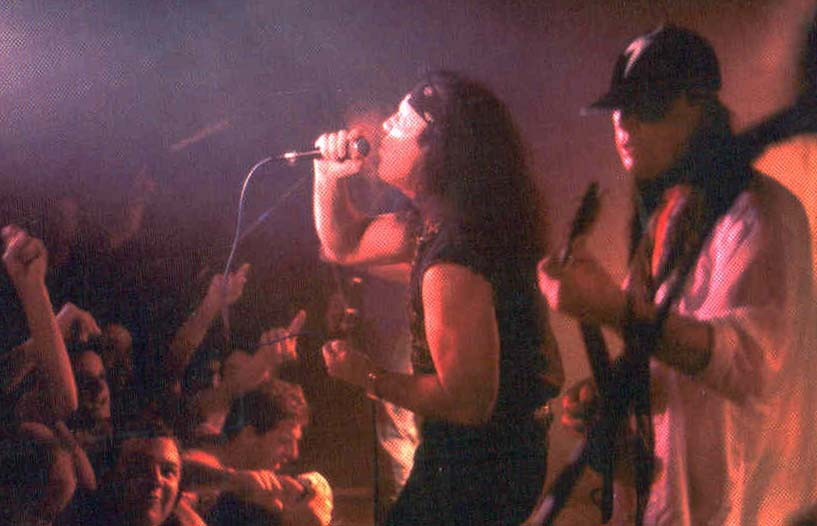
Evans singing with Rohan Moran

Evans also released a live recording, A Hell of a Night, which was a memorial gig for Bon Scott. It was recorded on the 20th anniversary of Scott's death, with Melbourne AC/DC tribute band Thunderstruck. Since then he has released six solo studio albums. On 7 September 2026, Evans announced that he would be releasing his seventh studio album, Justice, on 2 October, his first in 19 years.

== Discography ==
With AC/DC

- "Can I Sit Next to You, Girl" / "Rockin' in the Parlour" (1974) (single)

With Rabbit

- Rabbit (1975)
- Too Much Rock'n'Roll (1976)
- Defenders of Rock (2025)

With Thunder Down Under

- David Evans and Thunder Down Under (1986)

Solo

- A Hell of a Night (2000)
- Sinner (2004)
- Judgement Day (2008)
- Nothing to Prove (2014) – EP
- What About Tomorrow (2014) – EP
- Wild (2017) – EP
- Lightning & Thunder Live Latin American Tour (2019)
- Live (2020)
- Live on Fox Sports (2021) – EP
- Justice (2026)

Compilations

- Icons of Classic Rock Dave Evans (2011)
- Badass Greatest Hits (2021)

With Blood Duster

- "Sellout" – from the album Blood Duster (2003)

With John Nitzinger

- Revenge (2013) (album)

Singles

- "Bad Ass Boy" (2020)
- "We Don't Dance to Your Song (Live)" (2020)
- "Who's Gonna Rock Me?" (2021)
- "Rockin' in the Parlour (Live)" (2021)
- "Reach for the Sky (AlRock Live Sessions)" (2021)
- "Guitarman" (2022)
- "Heartbreak Hotel" (2022)
- "Loup Garou" (2026)
