= Mark Evans (musician) =

Australian bassist (born 1956)

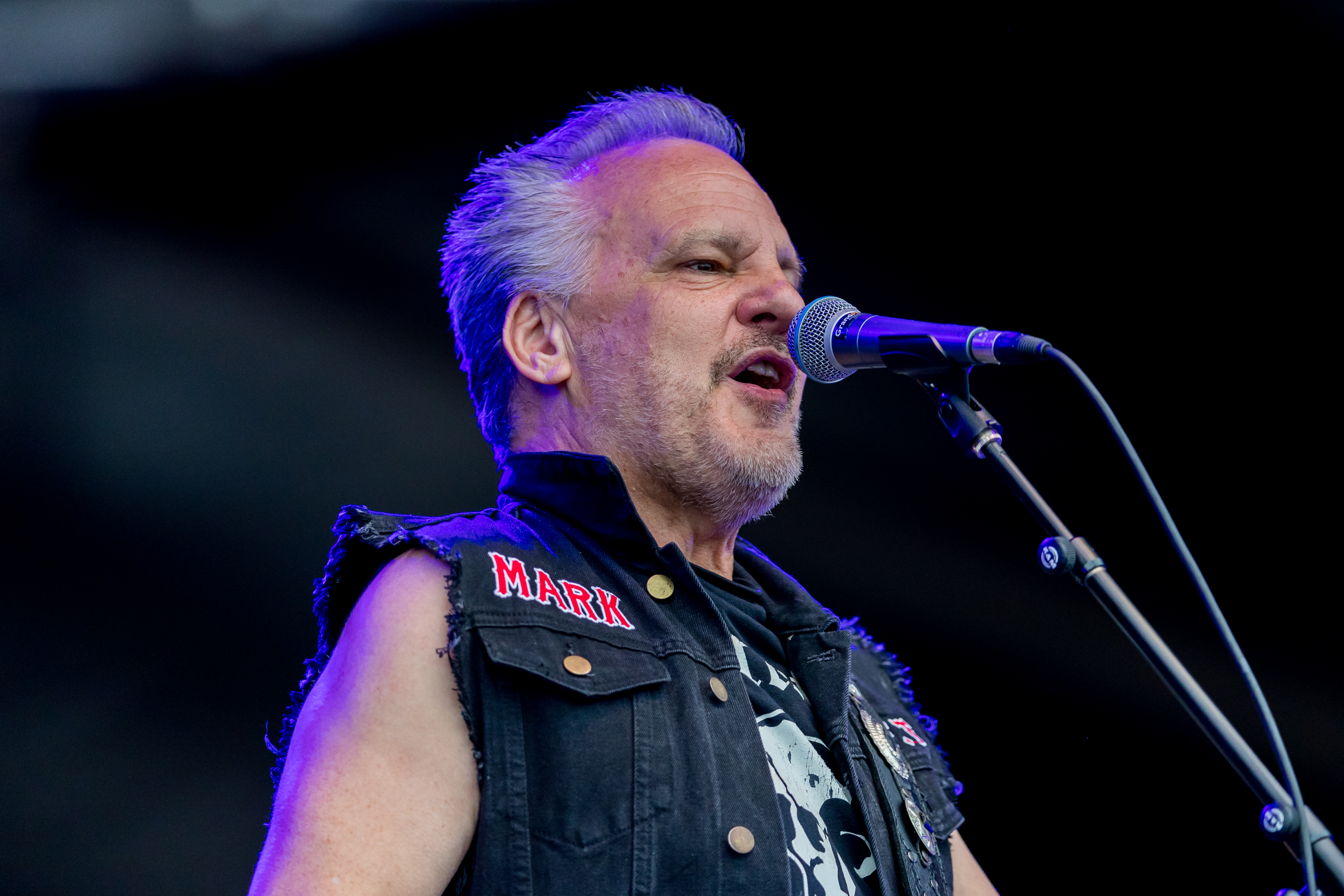
- Evans performing with Rose Tattoo in 2022

Background information
- Born: Mark Whitmore Evans; 2 March 1956 (age 70); Melbourne, Australia
- Genres: Rock, hard rock, blues
- Occupation: Musician
- Instruments: Bass guitar, guitar
- Years active: 1972–present

Mark Whitmore Evans (born 2 March 1956) is an Australian musician, the current bass guitarist for rock band Rose Tattoo, and also a member of hard rock band AC/DC from March 1975 to June 1977. His playing featured on their albums T.N.T, High Voltage, Dirty Deeds Done Dirt Cheap and Let There Be Rock. Evans has played for numerous other groups, sometimes on lead guitar, including Finch (a.k.a. Contraband), Cheetah, Swanee, Heaven and The Party Boys. Evans' autobiography, Dirty Deeds: My Life Inside/Outside of AC/DC was released in December 2011.

== Biography ==
Evans was born on 2 March 1956 and raised in Melbourne, Victoria. He was originally a guitarist, and early in 1975 he was introduced to hard rockers AC/DC at the Station Hotel, Melbourne, by his friend and the band's roadie, Steve McGrath. AC/DC formed in 1973 and released their debut album, High Voltage, in early 1975. At the time, Malcolm Young was playing bass guitar in a four-piece line-up alongside his brother Angus Young on lead guitar, Phil Rudd on drums and Bon Scott on vocals. Evans had been working as a clerk in the pay section of the Postmaster-General's Department when he auditioned for AC/DC and joined in March on bass guitar, allowing Malcolm to switch back to rhythm guitar.

Evans learned all the songs from the original version of High Voltage overnight and did not meet Scott until the next gig. In April, with Evans, AC/DC's first TV appearance was on pop music series Countdown. They played "Baby, Please Don't Go" (see Family Jewels) with Scott dressed as a school-girl. Evans appeared in several promotional videos, including the "It's a Long Way to the Top (If You Wanna Rock 'n' Roll)" and "Jailbreak" film clips. His playing is featured on their early albums T.N.T (1975), High Voltage (international version, 1976), Dirty Deeds Done Dirt Cheap (1976) and Let There Be Rock (1977); and only on the titletrack of the EP '74 Jailbreak (1984).

In May 1977, after the recording of Let There Be Rock, Evans was sacked from AC/DC due to "musical differences" and personality clashes with Angus. He was replaced by Cliff Williams. Scott stated in an interview in 1977 that one reason for replacing Evans was that Williams had several more years' experience playing bass guitar. Also, Malcolm Young said to Evans that they needed a bass player who could sing (to enhance the backing vocals). At the time, Evans stated, "Both me and the band are better for it". Neither of the Young brothers has aired their views on the split, but the CEO of Epic Records, Richard Griffiths, who worked as a booking agent for AC/DC in the mid-1970s, stated, "[Y]ou knew Mark wasn't going to last, he was just too much of a nice guy". Evans' last gig with the band was in Sweden on 22 April 1977 supporting Black Sabbath.

=== After departing AC/DC ===
After his departure from AC/DC, Evans played in a number of bands including hard rockers, Finch (a.k.a. Contraband), from June 1977 to 1979. This was followed by short stints with Cheetah in 1980 and Swanee in 1982. Evans joined the heavy metal group Heaven briefly in September 1983 on guitar as a replacement for Mick Cocks (ex-Rose Tattoo) following the recording of their "Where Angels Fear to Tread" album, but he left by July 1984. Evans featured in promo videos for "Rock School" and "Where Angels Fear to Tread". The group had some high-profile support slots, including opening for Mötley Crüe on their 'Shout at the Devil' tour, Kiss on their 1983-84 'Lick It Up' tour, their first without make-up, as well as the Ian Gillan led Black Sabbath. Evans has performed with ex-Buffalo singer Dave Tice in various bands, Headhunter, Dave Tice Band and Tice & Evans. He was a member of The Party Boys in the early 1990s. Dave Tice and Mark Evans release their latest recording 'Brothers In Arms' through Lungata Records and MGM Distribution 27 October 2011.

When, in November 2002, the Rock and Roll Hall of Fame announced that AC/DC were to be inducted in 2003, ex-members Mark Evans and Bon Scott were both on the list; however six weeks later Evans' name was dropped without explanation. In January 2003, Peter Holmes, writing for The Sun-Herald, said that Evans was devastated by the reversal. Paul Cashmere of Undercover noted that eight of the twenty-eight songs in AC/DC's 2000–2001 Stiff Upper Lip Tour setlist were originally recorded with Evans, Cashmere could not understand why the nomination was withdrawn "despite Mark's front-line position in the band's most important period". According to AllMusic's Eduardo Rivadavia, Evans was "cruelly denied induction into the Rock & Roll Hall of Fame, in 2003, along with his former band mates". This situation may be linked to the long legal battle that Mark Evans waged against AC/DC, and which was finally settled out of court.

Mark Evans' autobiography, Dirty Deeds: My Life Inside/Outside of AC/DC was released in North America in December 2011 by Bazillion Points.

In August 2017, it was announced that Evans had officially joined Rose Tattoo as their permanent bassist. He recorded with Rose Tattoo on their 2020 release Outlaws.

== Selected discography ==
- AC/DC – TNT (1975)
- AC/DC – High Voltage (1976)
- AC/DC – Dirty Deeds Done Dirt Cheap (1976)
- AC/DC – Let There Be Rock (1977)
- AC/DC – '74 Jailbreak (1984)
- AC/DC - Who Made Who (1986)
- AC/DC - Bonfire (1997)
- Finch – Nothing to Hide (1978)
- Contraband – Contraband (1979)
- Dave Tice & Mark Evans – Brothers in Arms (2011)
- Rose Tattoo - Outlaws (2020)
