= Malcolm Young =

Australian guitarist (1953–2017)

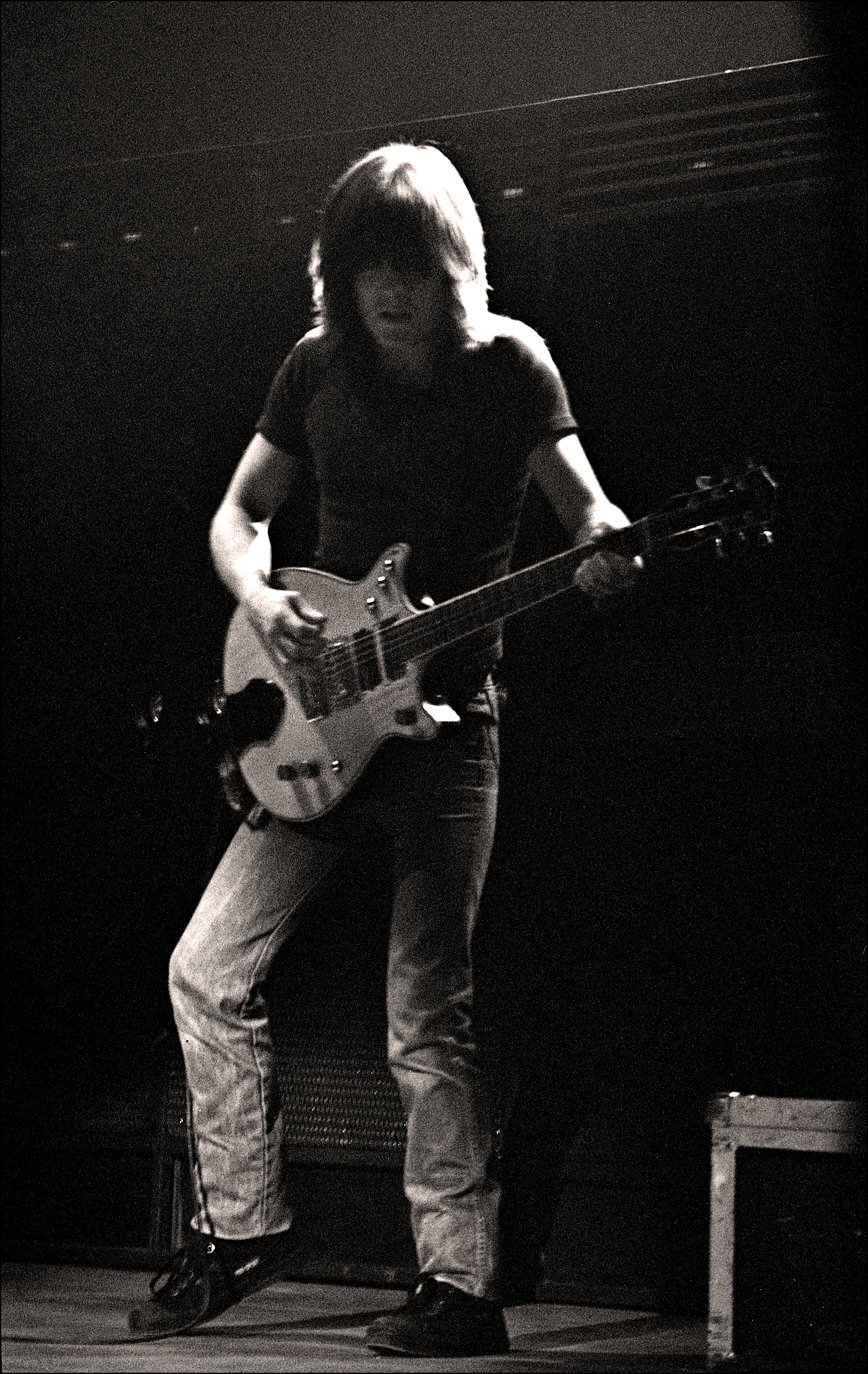
- Young performing in 1982

Background information
- Born: Malcolm Mitchell Young; 6 January 1953; Glasgow, Scotland
- Died: 18 November 2017 (aged 64) Elizabeth Bay, New South Wales, Australia
- Genres: Hard rock; blues rock; rock and roll
- Occupations: Musician; songwriter
- Instruments: Guitar; vocals
- Years active: 1969–2014
- Formerly of: AC/DC; Marcus Hook Roll Band
- Website: acdc.com

Malcolm Mitchell Young (6 January 1953 – 18 November 2017) was an Australian musician who was a founding member of the hard rock band AC/DC. Young was a rhythm guitarist, songwriter, and backing vocalist in the band. Except for a brief absence in 1988, Young was a member of AC/DC from its formation in 1973 until his retirement in 2014. As a member of AC/DC, Young was inducted into the Rock and Roll Hall of Fame in 2003. In 2023, Rolling Stone named Young and his younger brother and fellow AC/DC member Angus Young the 38th-best guitarists of all time.

== Early life ==
Malcolm Mitchell Young was born on 6 January 1953 in Glasgow, Scotland. Young's father, William Young (1911–1985), lived with his family at 6 Skerryvore Road in the Cranhill district of Glasgow. William Young worked as a machine and saw operator in an asbestos and cement business; served in World War II as a flight engine mechanic in the Royal Air Force; and later worked as a yard man and as a postman. He married Margaret (1913–1988; maiden name also Young), who was a housewife.

The "big freeze" of 1963 was one of the worst winters on record in Scotland, with snow 8 feet (2.4 m) deep. A TV advertisement shown in Scotland at that time offered assisted travel for families to start a new life in Australia. Fifteen members of the Young family left Scotland in late June 1963, including fifth son George (1946–2017) and younger brothers Malcolm and Angus (b. 1955). Another elder brother, Alex (1938–1997), who was a member of Tony Sheridan's backup group The Bobby Patrick Big Six, stayed in Europe and was later a member of London-based group Grapefruit.

Malcolm Young later detailed the family's musical background as follows: "All the males in our family played, Stevie, the oldest played accordion, Alex and John were the first couple to play guitar, and being older it was sort of passed down to George, then myself, then Angus."

Initially staying at Villawood Migrant Hostel (a site later turned into Villawood Immigration Detention Centre) in Nissen huts, George Young met and became friends with another migrant, Harry Vanda. The Young family then moved into a semi-detached house at 4 Burleigh Street in the Sydney suburb of Burwood.

== Career ==
Both Angus and Malcolm Young were in a band with their brother George and his musical partner Harry Vanda called the Marcus Hook Roll Band. The project released an album in Australia called Tales of Old Grand-Daddy. Malcolm Young played guitar on the 1974 release "Evie" by Stevie Wright, written and produced by Vanda and Young. The song is 11 minutes long and has three parts. Young played the guitar solo in Part One of the song. Malcolm Young was in a short lived Newcastle-based band The Velvet Underground (not the well-known 1960s band).

Malcolm Young was 20 when he and younger brother Angus formed AC/DC in 1973. Angus was on lead guitar, Malcolm on rhythm guitar, Colin Burgess on drums, Larry Van Kriedt on bass guitar and Dave Evans on vocals. Malcolm Young was also a songwriter and backing vocalist in the band. "Can I Sit Next To You Girl", their first single, was later re-recorded with Bon Scott as their vocalist. They decided upon the name AC/DC after seeing the letters "AC/DC" on the back of their sister Margaret's sewing machine. In 1975 AC/DC had moved to Melbourne.

In early 1977 they returned to Britain and began a European tour with Black Sabbath. While Bon Scott and Ozzy Osbourne quickly became friends, some other members of the two bands did not get on so well. In one incident, Young alleged that Geezer Butler pulled a knife on him, although Butler has since refuted that.

Towards the end of 1977, bassist Mark Evans was fired; Evans cited disagreement with Angus and Malcolm as a contributing factor. He was replaced by Cliff Williams.

Guitar Player magazine has stated that the secret to Young's guitar technique was playing open chords through a series of Marshall amplifiers, set to low volume without high gain. This is contrary to a common practice for many rhythm guitarists who use loud and overdriven power chords. In an interview with Guitar World, Angus Young described Malcolm has "the band's foundation", with hard-hitting right hand picking style devoted to each song's groove, subtle variations in the chord structure and knowing when to temporarily stop playing to enhance the song. Malcolm preferred unusually thick guitar strings made by Gibson Guitar (gauge .012-.058).

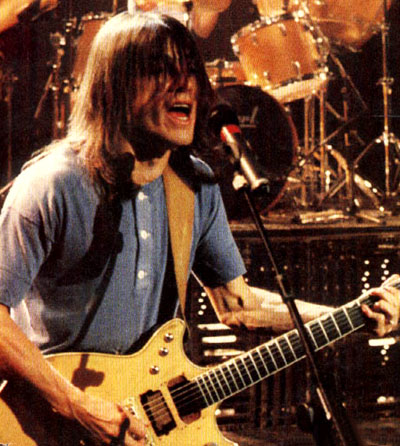
Young in the 1990s

In 1988, Young missed the majority of AC/DC's Blow Up Your Video World Tour to address alcohol abuse issues. He eventually became sober and returned to the band. During his absence he was replaced by his nephew, Stevie Young.

Playing guitar in AC/DC from 1973 until his last live gig with the band in June 2010, Malcolm Young toured the world with few breaks on a 37-year run with the band. He continued to write songs in AC/DC until he left the band in 2014, being replaced once again by his nephew Stevie.

In an interview with Guitar Player about Young's songwriting credits in Rock or Bust, Angus said:

Mal kept doing what he could until he couldn't do it anymore, but I have all the material he was working on. There were a lot of riffs, ideas, and bits of choruses. I'd fill things in to see if we had a song. Every album we've ever done has been that way. There was always a bit from the past, a bit from what we had that was brand new, and, sometimes, just an old idea that either Malcolm or myself had worked on but we never finished. The songwriting process didn't really change, except for the fact that Mal wasn't physically there. So when it came to writing and putting stuff together, I had Stevie [Young] there with me. You see, Malcolm was always a great organizer. He always kept track of the stuff we were writing together. He'd record it, date it, make notes. My records — if you can call them that — are always chaotic. So, this time, Stevie helped me organize a lot of what was there.

During production of their album Power Up, a source inside the band leaked that they were working with tracks from as far back as 2003 that Malcolm had recorded.

== Personal life, illness and death ==
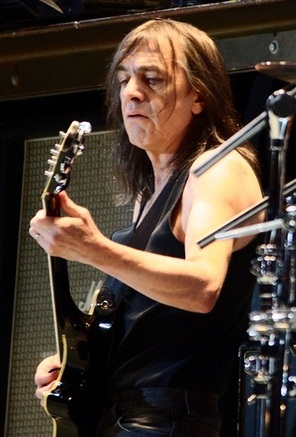
Young performing in 2010

Young was married to his wife, Linda. The Youngs had two children: Ross and Cara.

Young sought treatment for alcoholism in 1988.

At the conclusion of the Black Ice World Tour in 2010, Young was diagnosed with lung cancer. It was treated at an early stage, so surgery was successful and the cancer was removed. He also had an unspecified heart problem and a pacemaker.

In April 2014, Young became seriously ill and was unable to continue performing. On 16 April 2014, AC/DC released a note stating that Young would be "taking a break from the band due to ill health". On 24 September 2014, the band's management announced that Young was officially retiring and would not be rejoining AC/DC. Stevie Young filled in for Malcolm on the band's 2015 Rock or Bust World Tour and eventually became his full-time replacement.

On 26 September 2014, The Sydney Morning Herald reported that Young had been diagnosed with dementia and had been admitted to a nursing home where he could receive full-time care. In subsequent interviews, Angus stated that his brother had been experiencing lapses in memory and concentration before the Black Ice project and had been receiving treatment during the Black Ice World Tour, which ended in 2010. Angus also stated that Young was rehearsing AC/DC's songs repeatedly before every concert just to remember how they went. He added that AC/DC would continue according to his brother's wishes and standards.

Young died from dementia on 18 November 2017 at the age of 64, at Lulworth House in Elizabeth Bay. His funeral was held at St Mary's Cathedral, Sydney, on 28 November. Young's elder brother George died a few weeks before he did, on 22 October 2017.

== Legacy and influence ==
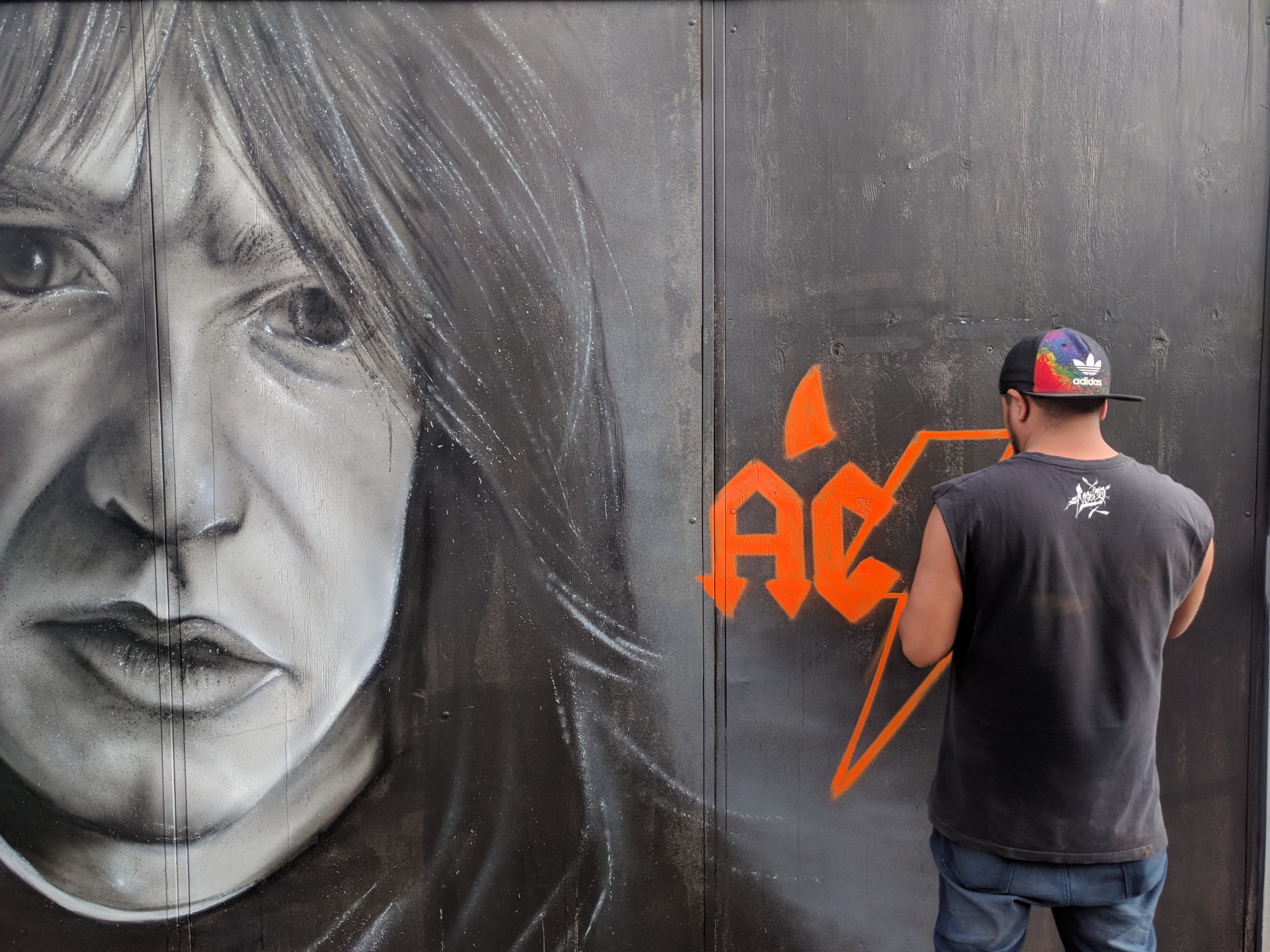
A street artist painting a Young portrait one day after Malcolm died

Influenced by 1950s rock and roll and blues-based rock guitarists of the 1960s and 1970s, Young was regarded as a leading rock exponent of rhythm guitar.

Dave Mustaine of Megadeth stated in a 2004 interview that he considered himself, Young, Rudolf Schenker of Scorpions, and James Hetfield of Metallica to be the best rhythm guitarists in the world.

As a member of AC/DC, Young was inducted into the Rock and Roll Hall of Fame in 2003.

On the day of Young's passing, several of the biggest names in rock and metal sent out tributes to him. Those artists included Eddie Van Halen, Ozzy Osbourne, Black Sabbath, Lars Ulrich of Metallica, Guns N' Roses, Dave Mustaine of Megadeth, Billy Idol, Paul Stanley of Kiss, Joe Walsh, Joe Satriani, Def Leppard, Scott Ian of Anthrax, Foo Fighters, Alice Cooper, Muse, and Vince Neil and Nikki Sixx of Mötley Crüe and many more. Many of these artists covered an AC/DC song at their concerts on the day of or around the time of Young's passing as part of their tribute, including Cheap Trick, Foo Fighters and Guns N' Roses.

In 2023, Rolling Stone named Young and his younger brother and fellow AC/DC member Angus Young the 38th-best guitarists of all time.

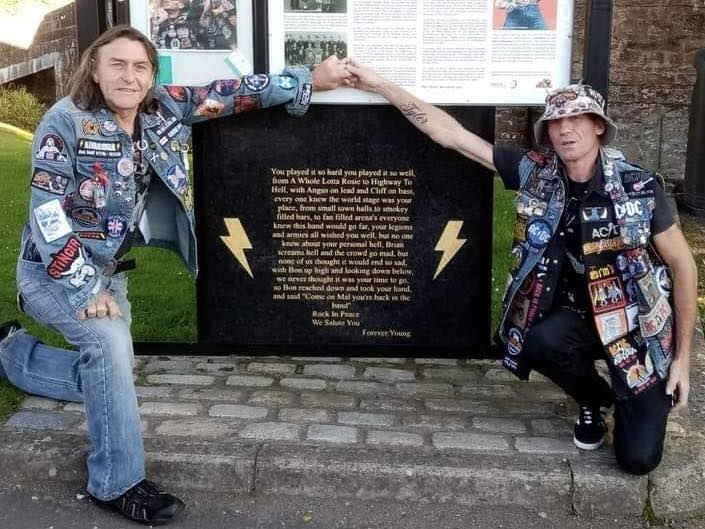
Creator David "Forever Young" Aberdeen and friend Carl "Kirrie-Mal" Cardus at the unveiling of the plaque in May 2018.

A memorial plaque to Young, designed and commissioned by a lifelong fan shortly after Mal’s death, stands beside the statue of his late bandmate Bon Scott in Kirriemuir, Scotland. The plaque was unveiled in May 2018, just two years after the unveiling of the statue, during the twelfth Bonfest, an annual music festival celebrating the band and their enduring legacy.

== Awards and nominations ==
=== APRA Awards ===
The APRA Awards are presented annually from 1982 by the Australasian Performing Right Association (APRA), "honouring composers and songwriters". They commenced in 1982.

Year	Nominee / work	Award	Result
1995	"Big Gun" – Angus Young, Malcolm Young	Most Played Australian Work Overseas	Won
2001	"It's a Long Way to the Top (If You Wanna Rock 'n' Roll)" – Bon Scott, Angus Young, Malcolm Young	Ten Best Australian Songs	Ninth
2006	"Highway to Hell" – Bon Scott, Angus Young, Malcolm Young	Most Played Australian Work Overseas	Nominated
2007	"Highway to Hell" – Bon Scott, Angus Young, Malcolm Young	Most Played Australian Work Overseas	Nominated
2009	"Highway to Hell" – Bon Scott, Angus Young, Malcolm Young	Most Played Australian Work Overseas	Won
2010	"Rock 'n' Roll Train" – Angus Young, Malcolm Young	Most Played Australian Work Overseas	Won
2010	Angus Young, Malcolm Young	Songwriters of the Year	Won
2011	"Highway to Hell" – Bon Scott, Angus Young, Malcolm Young	Most Played Australian Work Overseas	Won
2015	"Play Ball" – Angus Young, Malcolm Young	Song of the Year	Shortlisted
2015	"Rock or Bust" – Angus Young, Malcolm Young	Song of the Year	Shortlisted
2022	"Shot in the Dark"	Most Performed Rock Work	Won
2022	"Realize" – Angus Young, Malcolm Young	Song of the Year	Shortlisted
