= Black Ice World Tour =

2008–2010 concert tour by AC/DC

- Tour by AC/DC
- Poster to the concerts in London and Glasgow, UK
- Location: Asia; Europe; North America; Oceania; South America
- Associated album: Black Ice
- Start date: 26 October 2008
- End date: 28 June 2010
- Legs: 8
- No. of shows: 168
- Supporting acts: The Answer; Redwood; Amajlija; Mundo Cão; The Vicious Five; Cafe Bertrand; Skambankt; Blake; The Floor Is Made of Lava; Bullet; Drive Like Maria; The Subways; The Blizzards; Anvil; Mustang; Jonathan Tyler & the Northern Lights; Megaphone; Mill Muertos; Nasi; Héroes Del Asfalto; Las Pelotas; The Checks; Shihad; Calling All Cars; Wolfmother; Rival Sons; Shaman's Harvest; Broken Spurs; Black Frog; The Last Vegas; Konkourent; Down; Iris; Le Vibrazioni; Maurizio Soliberi; Boon; Kaiser Franz Josef; Volbeat; Accept; Dżem; Audrey Horne; Zero Nine; Hardcore Superstar; Black City; Krokus
- Box office: $441.6 million (Note: $651.99 million in 2025 dollars.)

AC/DC concert chronology
- Club Dates/Rolling Stones Tour (2003); Black Ice World Tour (2008–2010); Rock or Bust World Tour (2015–2016)

The Black Ice World Tour was a concert tour by the Australian rock band AC/DC, in support of their fifteenth studio album Black Ice, which was released on 20 October 2008. This tour had 8 legs around the world lasting more than 20 months starting on 26 October 2008 in Wilkes-Barre, Pennsylvania and finishing on 28 June 2010 in Bilbao, Spain.

== Background ==
=== Overview ===
The tour was the band's first since the Stiff Upper Lip World Tour in 2000 and 2001.

"It never gets boring," declared Johnson. "They're just the best rock band – and, just to listen to them every night, it gets me. Every time they kick in, you think, 'What the fuck?!' You're on again and you're thinking, 'This is ridiculous! I'm still grooving!'"

=== History ===
The tour began with a North American leg, kicking off in Wilkes-Barre, Pennsylvania in late October and continuing until late December. The initial leg was met with unprecedented demand, with 18 record sell-outs across the continent. A second North American leg commenced in January 2009, ultimately culminating later in the month in Nashville, Tennessee.

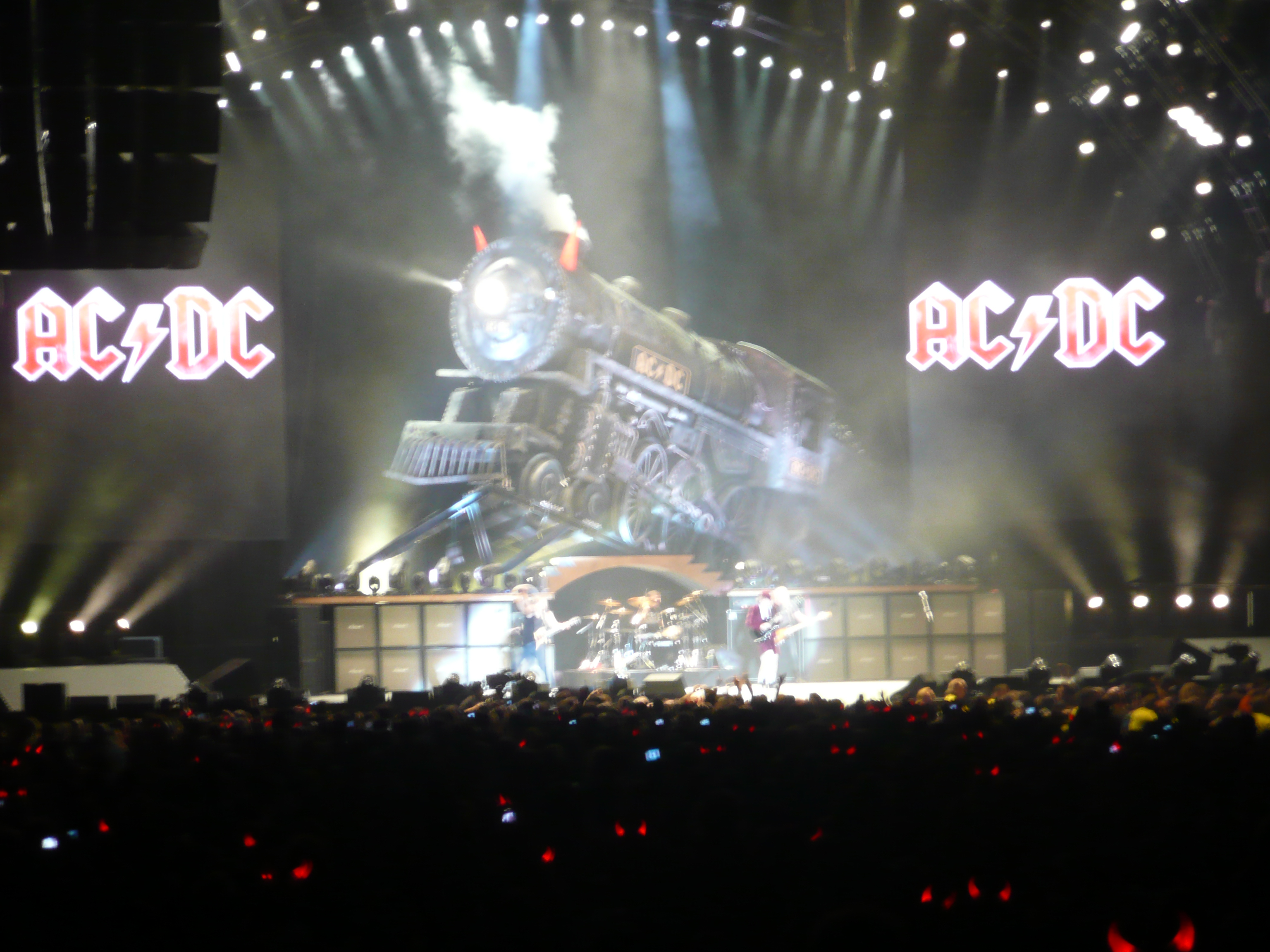
AC/DC performing at Rogers Centre in Toronto on 7 November 2008.

In February 2009, the group began their first round of European shows, beginning in Oslo and wrapping up in Birmingham, U.K. in April. One of two dates scheduled in Antwerp, Belgium was cancelled after lead singer Brian Johnson fell ill. On 29 March, the concert in Zürich, Switzerland was postponed due to undisclosed "technical difficulties" and was rescheduled for 6 April.

In May 2009, the band commenced a second European leg – all in outdoor stadiums and venues – beginning in Leipzig, Germany and ended the following month in Glasgow, Scotland.

In July 2009, the band started a third leg of North America, playing a mix of outdoor and indoor venues. The tour reached many Canadian markets that had been missed on the previous two legs. A fourth leg, which included dates in Mexico and Puerto Rico, followed in October and November. The initial six dates on the leg were postponed after Johnson underwent a medical procedure which subsequently required rest. Five of these shows were ultimately rescheduled for spring 2010; one date to be held in Phoenix, Arizona was cancelled due to a "scheduling conflict".

To Classic Rock in July 2009, Brian Johnson remarked: "We were talking about the end of the tour and I said, 'We're finishing in May and that's me done!' But Malcolm said, 'What are you talking about? We're not gonna let you retire!'"

In November and December 2009, the band headed to South America, playing shows in Brazil and Argentina. The concerts in Buenos Aires were filmed for the DVD Live at River Plate, to be released on 10 May 2011. Footage was also used in the video for "Shoot to Thrill", on the Iron Man 2 soundtrack, along with another video with footage and audio from the Buenos Aires shows of "Highway to Hell" which is also featured in the Iron Man 2 soundtrack. Earlier in November, it was falsely reported that a group of fans had issued a complaint to the band, criticising the setlist; it was merely a request to mix up the current touring setlist.

In January 2010, the group began a round of dates in New Zealand, subsequently reaching their native Australia in February. The Australian shows were the fastest selling concerts in the history of the country, with extra dates added in most markets due to demand. In early February, Johnson responded to the internet fans who had asked for a setlist change, saying "Fuck them", and that the stage show was too complicated for them to change songs easily. Following the Australian tour, which ended in Perth, Western Australia, the group played three shows in Japan.

On the Oceania tour leg from 28 January 2010 – 8 March 2010, "High Voltage" was played in tribute to Bon Scott around the 30th anniversary of his death. Scott appeared on the screen during the chorus.

In April 2010, the band returned to the United States to play the five shows rescheduled from October 2009. Later that month, Iron Man 2 – soundtrack to the film of the same name – was released. It comprised a host of the group's hits and lesser-known songs from early to recent years, and debuted at number four on the Billboard 200 album chart.

In May 2010, the band commenced a third leg of Europe, which included an appearance at the Download Festival in the U.K. "The reports that AC/DC believe their record-breaking fourth appearance at the Donington site to be their own gig, rather than part of the festival, is compounded by the fact that they've brought their own stage," remarked Classic Rock. "In Brian Johnson's grunted banter between songs there's no reference to this being anything other than another AC/DC gig, but another AC/DC gig these days is better than almost anything else you're gonna see."

In Oslo in late May, the group were forced to cut their set short due to the local curfew, after an aircraft malfunction caused a delay to the band's arrival. "For Those About to Rock (We Salute You)" was omitted from the setlist for the first time since 30 July 2003. The tour wrapped up in Bilbao, Spain at Estadio San Mamés in late June.

The tour won the "Major Tour of the Year" award at the 2009 Pollstar Concert Industry Awards. The tour was also nominated in the "Top Tour" and "Top Draw" categories at the 2009 Billboard Touring Awards. According to Billboard, the tour "has clearly tapped into a demand for AC/DC, resulting from the band's eight-year absence from touring, and takes its place as one of the band's most successful tours."

By the tour's culmination, the group had played over 160 shows to approximately 4.9 million people. It was one of history's highest grossing concert tours, grossing $441.6 million, third behind The Rolling Stones' A Bigger Bang Tour, which grossed $558.3 million in the mid-2000s, and U2's 360° Tour, which grossed $736.1 million in 2011. It dropped to fourth place after Roger Waters' The Wall Live tour when the latter ended in 2013.

== Set list ==
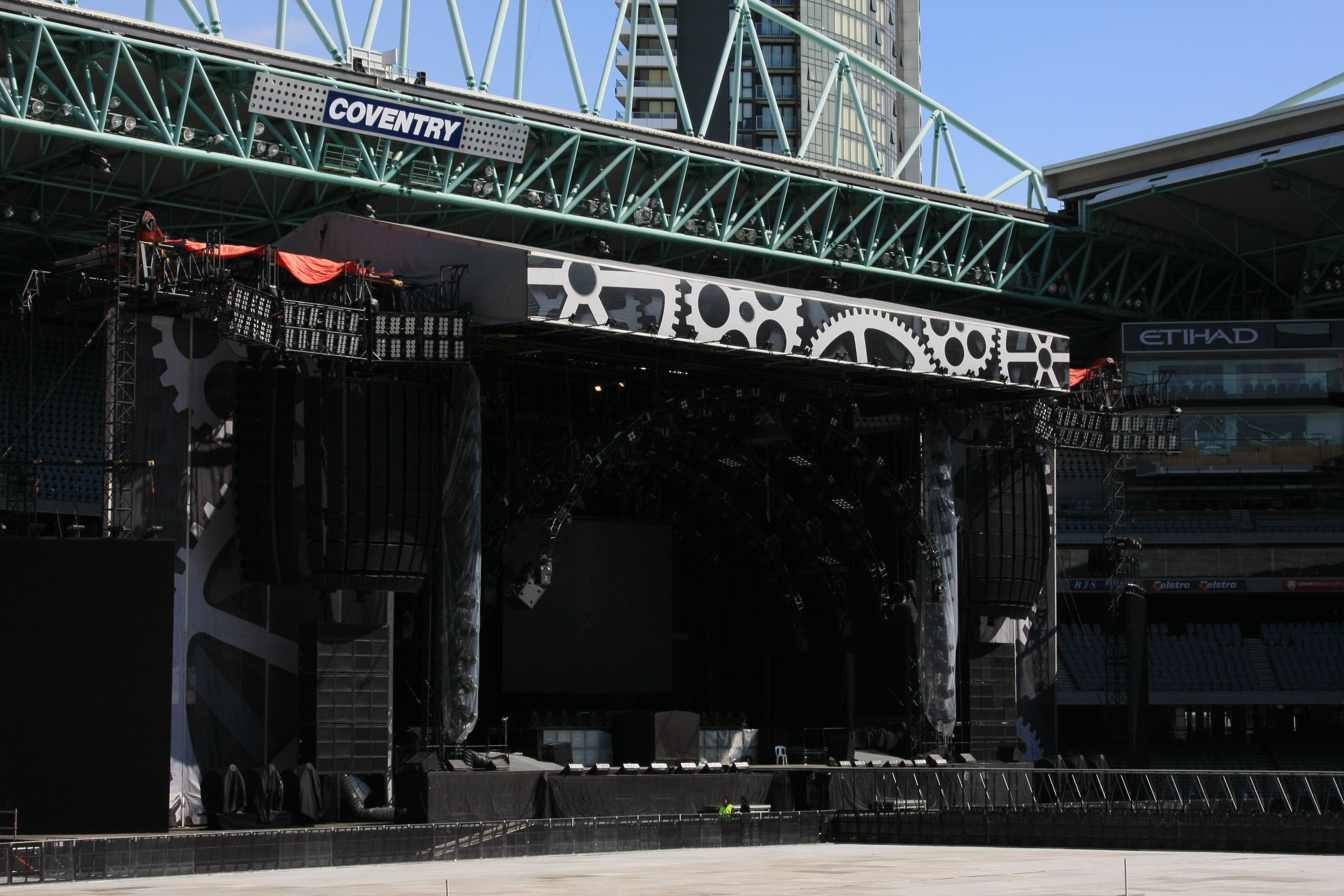
A shot of the touring stage taken in between a three show run at Etihad Stadium in Melbourne, Australia on 14 February 2010.

1. "Rock 'n' Roll Train"
2. "Hell Ain't a Bad Place to Be"
3. "Back in Black"
4. "Big Jack"
5. "Dirty Deeds Done Dirt Cheap"
6. "Shot Down in Flames"^{[a]}
7. "Thunderstruck"
8. "Black Ice"^{[f]}
9. "The Jack"
10. "Hells Bells"
11. "Shoot to Thrill"^{[b]}
12. "War Machine"^{[f]}
13. "Dog Eat Dog"^{[c]}
14. "Anything Goes"^{[e]}
15. "High Voltage"^{[d]}
16. "You Shook Me All Night Long"
17. "T.N.T."
18. "Whole Lotta Rosie"
19. "Let There Be Rock"

Encore

20. "Highway to Hell"
21. "For Those About to Rock (We Salute You)"^{[f]}

Notes

- a. Played on all dates from 20 February 2009 to 28 June 2010 (excl. 30 May 2010 in Oslo).
- b. Omitted on 28 October 2008 in Wilkes-Barre.
- c. Played on all dates from 13 May 2009 to 6 December 2009.
- d. Played on all dates in Oceania from 28 January 2010 to 8 March 2010 in tribute to Bon Scott around the 30th anniversary of his death, and on 11 June 2010 at Donington Park during the Download Festival 2010.
- e. Played on all dates from 28 October 2008 to 24 October 2009.
- f. Omitted on 30 May 2010 in Oslo.

== Tour dates ==
List of 2008 concerts
Date (2008)	City	Country	Venue	Opening act	Attendance	Revenue
26 October (Note: This show on 26 October 2008 was a final dress rehearsal, and has been attended by contest winners.)	Wilkes-Barre	United States	Wachovia Arena	—N/a	13,500 / 13,500	—N/a
28 October	Wilkes-Barre	United States	Wachovia Arena	The Answer	13,500 / 13,500	$920,000
30 October	Rosemont	United States	Allstate Arena	The Answer	27,770 / 27,770	$2,485,415
1 November	Rosemont	United States	Allstate Arena	The Answer	27,770 / 27,770	$2,485,415
3 November	Indianapolis	United States	Conseco Fieldhouse	The Answer	14,458 / 14,458	$1,314,215
5 November	Auburn Hills	United States	The Palace of Auburn Hills	The Answer	15,189 / 15,189	$1,276,091
7 November	Toronto	Canada	Rogers Centre	The Answer	45,000 / 45,000	$4,477,500
9 November	Boston	United States	TD Banknorth Garden	The Answer	13,718 / 13,718	$1,255,040
12 November	New York City	United States	Madison Square Garden	The Answer	28,136 / 28,136	$2,465,450
13 November	New York City	United States	Madison Square Garden	The Answer	28,136 / 28,136	$2,465,450
15 November	Washington, D.C.	United States	Verizon Center	The Answer	14,931 / 14,931	$1,381,117
17 November	Philadelphia	United States	Wachovia Center	The Answer	15,402 / 15,402	$1,424,685
19 November	East Rutherford	United States	Izod Center	The Answer	20,000 / 20,000	$1,790,000
21 November	Columbus	United States	Value City Arena	The Answer	13,704 / 18,325	$1,226,508
23 November	St. Paul	United States	Xcel Energy Center	The Answer	15,419 / 15,419	$1,380,001
25 November	Denver	United States	Pepsi Center	The Answer	12,000 / 12,000	$1,074,000
28 November	Vancouver	Canada	General Motors Place	The Answer	14,000 / 14,000	$1,393,000
30 November	Tacoma	United States	Tacoma Dome	The Answer	21,460 / 21,460	$1,920,670
2 December	Oakland	United States	Oracle Arena	The Answer	28,502 / 28,502	$2,565,180
4 December	Oakland	United States	Oracle Arena	The Answer	28,502 / 28,502	$2,565,180
6 December	Inglewood	United States	The Forum	The Answer	28,594 / 28,594	$2,673,539
8 December	Inglewood	United States	The Forum	The Answer	28,594 / 28,594	$2,673,539
10 December	Phoenix	United States	US Airways Center	The Answer	14,004 / 14,712	$1,352,852
12 December	San Antonio	United States	AT&T Center	The Answer	14,491 / 14,491	$1,235,229
14 December	Houston	United States	Toyota Center	The Answer	13,317 / 13,317	$1,178,626
16 December	Atlanta	United States	Philips Arena	The Answer	16,090 / 16,090	$1,268,752
18 December	Charlotte	United States	Time Warner Cable Arena	The Answer	15,125 / 15,125	$1,360,148
20 December	Sunrise	United States	BankAtlantic Center	The Answer	14,388 / 14,388	$1,276,696
21 December	Tampa	United States	St. Pete Times Forum	The Answer	15,218 / 15,218	$1,347,033

List of 2009 concerts
Date (2009)	City	Country	Venue	Opening act	Attendance	Revenue
5 January	Cleveland	United States	Quicken Loans Arena	The Answer	20,500 / 20,500	$1,875,750
7 January	Pittsburgh	United States	Mellon Arena	The Answer	12,937 / 13,118	$1,145,063
9 January	Toronto	Canada	Rogers Centre	The Answer	45,350 / 45,350	$3,414,693
11 January	Cincinnati	United States	U.S. Bank Arena	The Answer	11,864 / 12,004	$1,053,863
13 January	St. Louis	United States	Scottrade Center	The Answer	14,394 / 14,394	$1,276,091
15 January	Omaha	United States	Qwest Center	The Answer	14,591 / 14,591	$1,305,895
17 January	Fargo	United States	Fargodome	The Answer	21,692 / 21,692	$1,870,334
19 January	St. Paul	United States	Xcel Energy Center	The Answer	15,499 / 15,499	$1,387,161
21 January	Kansas City	United States	Sprint Center	The Answer	15,000 / 15,000	$1,387,500
23 January	Dallas	United States	American Airlines Center	The Answer	14,521 / 14,521	$1,253,179
26 January	Tulsa	United States	BOK Center	The Answer	17,000 / 17,000	$1,555,500
28 January	North Little Rock	United States	Alltel Arena	The Answer	11,858 / 11,858	$953,327
30 January	Memphis	United States	FedExForum	The Answer	13,673 / 13,673	$1,155,086
31 January	Nashville	United States	Sommet Center	The Answer	14,476 / 14,476	$1,263,441
18 February	Oslo	Norway	Telenor Arena	The Answer	22,100 / 22,100	$1,387,217
20 February	Stockholm	Sweden	Ericsson Globe	The Answer	27,000 / 27,000	$1,844,100
22 February	Stockholm	Sweden	Ericsson Globe	The Answer	27,000 / 27,000	$1,844,100
25 February	Paris	France	Palais omnisports de Paris-Bercy	The Answer	33,000 / 33,000	$2,758,140
27 February	Paris	France	Palais omnisports de Paris-Bercy	The Answer	33,000 / 33,000	$2,758,140
1 March	Antwerp	Belgium	Sportpaleis	The Answer	16,279 / 16,279	$1,157,604
5 March	Leipzig	Germany	Messehalle	The Answer	16,700 / 16,700	$1,390,108
7 March	Düsseldorf	Germany	ISS Dome	The Answer	12,488 / 12,488	$1,039,501
9 March	Oberhausen	Germany	König Pilsener Arena	The Answer	11,545 / 11,545	$961,005
11 March	Bremen	Germany	AWD-Dome	The Answer	11,764 / 11,764	$979,235
13 March	Rotterdam	Netherlands	Sportpaleis van Ahoy	The Answer	9,700 / 9,700	$666,293
15 March	Dortmund	Germany	Westfalenhalle	The Answer	12,254 / 12,254	$1,020,022
17 March	Prague	Czech Republic	O_{2} Arena	The Answer	14,000 / 14,000	$1,045,520
19 March	Milan	Italy	Mediolanum Forum	The Answer	23,000 / 23,000	$1,817,000
21 March	Milan	Italy	Mediolanum Forum	The Answer	23,000 / 23,000	$1,817,000
23 March	Budapest	Hungary	Budapest Sportaréna	The Answer	14,400 / 14,400	$999,282
25 March	Frankfurt	Germany	Festhalle Frankfurt	The Answer	13,079 / 13,079	$1,088,695
27 March	Munich	Germany	Olympiahalle	The Answer	11,136 / 11,136	$926,960
31 March	Barcelona	Spain	Palau Sant Jordi	The Answer	17,880 / 17,880	$1,330,203
2 April	Madrid	Spain	Palacio de los Deportes	The Answer	15,911 / 15,911	$1,189,202
4 April	Bilbao	Spain	Bizkaia Arena	The Answer	16,320 / 16,320	$1,206,635
6 April (Note: Originally scheduled for 29 March 2009.)	Zürich	Switzerland	Hallenstadion	Redwood	12,500 / 12,500	$858,625
14 April	London	England	The O_{2} Arena	The Answer	36,383 / 37,310	$2,155,362
16 April	London	England	The O_{2} Arena	The Answer	36,383 / 37,310	$2,155,362
18 April	Dublin	Ireland	The O_{2}	The Answer	12,060 / 12,060	$979,364
21 April	Manchester	England	Manchester Evening News Arena	The Answer	15,000 / 15,000	$812,250
23 April	Birmingham	England	LG Arena	The Answer	11,800 / 11,800	$638,970
13 May	Leipzig	Germany	Zentralstadion	The Answer	51,000 / 51,000	$4,758,810
15 May	Munich	Germany	Olympiastadion	The Answer	70,000 / 70,000	$6,531,700
17 May	Gelsenkirchen	Germany	Veltins-Arena	The Answer	58,000 / 58,000	$5,411,980
19 May	Cologne	Germany	Müngersdorfer Stadion	The Answer	45,724 / 45,724	$4,266,506
22 May	Hockenheim	Germany	Hockenheimring	The Answer	90,000 / 90,000	$8,397,900
24 May	Vienna	Austria	Ernst-Happel-Stadion	The Answer	60,000 / 60,000	$5,488,800
26 May	Belgrade	Serbia	Partizan Stadium	The Answer; Amajlija	32,716 / 45,000	$2,363,549
28 May	Athens	Greece	Olympiakó Stádio	The Answer	45,000 / 73,997	$5,100,750
3 June	Lisbon	Portugal	Estádio José Alvalade	Mundo Cão; The Vicious Five	51,500 / 51,500	$3,537,535
5 June	Madrid	Spain	Vicente Calderón Stadium	The Answer	55,000 / 55,000	$4,093,100
7 June	Barcelona	Spain	Estadi Olímpic Lluís Companys	The Answer	64,196 / 64,376	$5,906,138
9 June	Marseille	France	Stade Vélodrome	The Answer; Cafe Bertrand	57,000 / 57,000	$5,123,160
12 June	Saint-Denis	France	Stade de France	The Answer; Cafe Bertrand	78,000 / 78,000	$6,123,000
15 June	Oslo	Norway	Valle Hovin	The Answer; Skambankt	40,000 / 40,000	$4,136,860
17 June	Helsinki	Finland	Helsinki Olympic Stadium	The Answer; Blake	44,522 / 44,522	$4,640,928
19 June	Copenhagen	Denmark	Parken Stadium	The Answer; The Floor Is Made of Lava	48,869 / 48,869	$5,363,954
21 June	Gothenburg	Sweden	Ullevi Stadion	The Answer; Bullet	56,568 / 56,568	$4,518,232
23 June	Amsterdam	Netherlands	Amsterdam Arena	The Answer; Drive Like Maria	50,541 / 50,541	$4,361,233
26 June	London	England	Wembley Stadium	The Answer; The Subways	70,000 / 70,000	$5,209,400
28 June	Naas	Ireland	Punchestown Racecourse	The Answer; The Blizzards	69,354 / 69,354	$6,826,792
30 June	Glasgow	Scotland	Hampden Park	The Answer; The Subways	52,000 / 52,000	$3,571,880
28 July	Foxborough	United States	Gillette Stadium	The Answer; Anvil	46,500 / 46,500	$3,162,000
31 July	East Rutherford	United States	Giants Stadium	The Answer; Anvil	46,673 / 53,567	$3,266,661
2 August	Albany	United States	Times Union Center	The Answer	—	—
6 August	Moncton	Canada	Magnetic Hill Concert Site	Anvil; The Answer	70,000 / 90,000	$12,044,900
8 August	Montreal	Canada	Stade Olympique	The Answer	53,049 / 53,049	$4,234,534
10 August	Ottawa	Canada	Scotiabank Place	The Answer	14,071 / 14,071	$1,290,639
14 August	Chicago	United States	United Center	The Answer	12,995 / 14,381	$1,163,053
16 August	Auburn Hills	United States	The Palace of Auburn Hills	The Answer	11,920 / 15,100	$938,248
18 August	Grand Rapids	United States	Van Andel Arena	The Answer	10,124 / 10,788	$895,896
22 August	Winnipeg	Canada	Canad Inns Stadium	The Answer	41,536 / 41,536	$3,665,372
24 August	Regina	Canada	Mosaic Stadium at Taylor Field	The Answer	41,271 / 41,271	$3,531,449
26 August	Edmonton	Canada	Commonwealth Stadium	The Answer	55,838 / 55,838	$4,764,061
29 August	Vancouver	Canada	BC Place Stadium	The Answer	47,021 / 47,021	$4,122,831
31 August (Note: Originally scheduled for 30 August 2009.)	Tacoma	United States	Tacoma Dome	The Answer	19,906 / 19,906	$1,781,587
2 September	San Jose	United States	HP Pavilion at San Jose	The Answer	—	—
4 September	Fresno	United States	Save Mart Center at Fresno State	The Answer	—	—
6 September	San Diego	United States	San Diego Sports Arena	The Answer	11,033 / 11,258	$965,379
8 September	Anaheim	United States	Honda Center	The Answer	12,123 / 12,892	$1,080,749
16 October	Washington, D.C.	United States	Verizon Center	The Answer	11,258 / 14,048	$1,010,930
18 October	Buffalo	United States	HSBC Arena	The Answer	—	—
21 October	Philadelphia	United States	Wachovia Center	The Answer	8,546 / 15,134	$744,907
23 October	Atlanta	United States	Philips Arena	The Answer	10,416 / 12,469	$832,481
25 October	Greensboro	United States	Greensboro Coliseum	The Answer	13,681 / 14,934	$923,101
28 October	New Orleans	United States	New Orleans Arena	The Answer	8,613 / 17,000	$770,864
30 October	Jacksonville	United States	Jacksonville Veterans Memorial Arena	The Answer	9,778 / 10,550	$792,307
2 November	Dallas	United States	American Airlines Center	The Answer	9,241 / 13,214	$742,313
4 November	Oklahoma City	United States	Ford Center	The Answer	8,027 / 11,775	$686,376
6 November	Austin	United States	Frank Erwin Center	The Answer	11,500 / 11,500	$1,029,250
8 November	Houston	United States	Toyota Center	The Answer	11,115 / 12,895	$653,958
12 November	Mexico City	Mexico	Foro Sol	Mustang	50,853 / 53,536	$2,766,306
15 November	El Paso	United States	Don Haskins Center	Jonathan Tyler & the Northern Lights	—	—
19 November	Orlando	United States	Amway Arena	Megaphone	17,740 / 17,740	$1,605,470
21 November	San Juan	Puerto Rico	José Miguel Agrelot Coliseum	Mil Muertos	18,500 / 18,500	$1,655,750
27 November	São Paulo	Brazil	Estádio do Morumbi	Nasi	69,354 / 69,354	$6,928,7000
2 December (Note: This concert was recorded as part of concert film Live at River Plate.)	Buenos Aires	Argentina	River Plate Stadium	Héroes Del Asfalto; Las Pelotas	170,630 / 191,649	$9,202,394
4 December (Note: This concert was recorded as part of concert film Live at River Plate and live album Live at River Plate.)	Buenos Aires	Argentina	River Plate Stadium	Héroes Del Asfalto; Las Pelotas	170,630 / 191,649	$9,202,394
6 December	Buenos Aires	Argentina	River Plate Stadium	Héroes Del Asfalto; Las Pelotas	170,630 / 191,649	$9,202,394

List of 2010 concerts
Date (2010)	City	Country	Venue	Opening act	Attendance	Revenue
28 January	Wellington	New Zealand	Westpac Stadium	The Checks; Shihad	60,400 / 60,400	$6,253,709
30 January	Wellington	New Zealand	Westpac Stadium	The Checks; Shihad	60,400 / 60,400	$6,253,709
4 February	Auckland	New Zealand	Western Springs Stadium	The Checks; Shihad	49,963 / 49,963	$5,484,920
11 February	Melbourne	Australia	Etihad Stadium	Calling All Cars; Wolfmother	184,469 / 184,469	$23,356,091
13 February	Melbourne	Australia	Etihad Stadium	Calling All Cars; Wolfmother	184,469 / 184,469	$23,356,091
15 February	Melbourne	Australia	Etihad Stadium	Calling All Cars; Wolfmother	184,469 / 184,469	$23,356,091
18 February	Sydney	Australia	ANZ Stadium	Calling All Cars; Wolfmother	213,045 / 213,045	$25,665,711
20 February	Sydney	Australia	ANZ Stadium	Calling All Cars; Wolfmother	213,045 / 213,045	$25,665,711
22 February	Sydney	Australia	ANZ Stadium	Calling All Cars; Wolfmother	213,045 / 213,045	$25,665,711
25 February	Brisbane	Australia	Queensland Sport and Athletics Centre	Calling All Cars; Wolfmother	90,039 / 90,039	$10,374,709
27 February	Brisbane	Australia	Queensland Sport and Athletics Centre	Calling All Cars; Wolfmother	90,039 / 90,039	$10,374,709
2 March	Adelaide	Australia	Adelaide Oval	Calling All Cars; Wolfmother	41,569 / 41,569	$5,396,590
6 March	Perth	Australia	Subiaco Oval	Calling All Cars; Wolfmother	97,907 / 97,907	$12,363,928
8 March	Perth	Australia	Subiaco Oval	Calling All Cars; Wolfmother	97,907 / 97,907	$12,363,928
12 March	Saitama	Japan	Saitama Super Arena	—N/a	32,000 / 32,000	$3,332,800
14 March	Saitama	Japan	Saitama Super Arena	—N/a	32,000 / 32,000	$3,332,800
16 March	Osaka	Japan	Osaka Dome	—N/a	36,000 / 36,000	$3,749,400
9 April (Note: Originally scheduled for 3 October 2009.)	Las Vegas	United States	MGM Grand Garden Arena	Rival Sons	13,500 / 13,500	$1,268,730
11 April (Note: Originally scheduled for 8 October 2009.)	Kansas City	United States	Sprint Center	Shaman's Harvest	12,000 / 18,000	$1,098,000
13 April (Note: Originally scheduled for 6 October 2009.)	Louisville	United States	Freedom Hall	Broken Spurs	16,000 / 16,000	$1,464,000
15 April (Note: Originally scheduled for 14 October 2009.)	Milwaukee	United States	Bradley Center	Black Frog	20,000 / 20,000	$2,088,000
17 April (Note: Originally scheduled for 10 October 2009.)	Des Moines	United States	Wells Fargo Arena	The Last Vegas	15,000 / 15,000	$1,357,500
14 May	Sofia	Bulgaria	Vasil Levski Stadium	Konkourent	60,000 / 60,000	$7,015,800
16 May	Bucharest	Romania	Piața Constituției	Down; Iris	60,000 / 70,000	$6,623,400
19 May	Udine	Italy	Stadio Friuli	Le Vibrazioni; Maurizio Solieri	46,487 / 46,487	$3,832,634
22 May	Wels	Austria	Flugplatz	Boon; Kaiser Franz Josef; Volbeat	82,000 / 82,000	$7,689,140
25 May	Hanover	Germany	Messegelände	Accept; Boon	80,000 / 80,000	$7,556,800
27 May	Warsaw	Poland	Bemowo Airport	Dżem	63,303 / 70,000	$4,120,923
30 May	Oslo	Norway	Valle Hovin	Audrey Horne	40,000 / 40,000	$4,403,739
1 June	Tampere	Finland	Ratina Stadion	Zero Nine	32,475 / 32,475	$3,137,809
3 June	Stockholm	Sweden	Olympiastadion	Hardcore Superstar	31,790 / 31,790	$2,859,735
5 June	Horsens	Denmark	CASA Arena Horsens	Black City	30,000 / 30,000	—
8 June (Note: Originally scheduled to take place at Letzigrund, Zurich.)	Bern	Switzerland	Stade de Suisse	Krokus	42,000 / 45,000	$5,902,680
10 June (Note: This concert was part of Download Festival.)	Leicestershire	England	Donington Park	—N/a	90,000 / 110,000	$17,667,000
13 June (Note: Originally scheduled for 10 July 2009.)	Stuttgart	Germany	Cannstatter Wasen	—N/a	60,981 / 60,981	—
15 June	Nice	France	Stade Charles-Ehrmann	—N/a	40,000 / 56,000	—
18 June	Saint-Denis	France	Stade de France	—N/a	78,000 / 78,000	$6,123,000
20 June	Dresden	Germany	Ostragehege	—N/a	70,000 / 70,000	—
22 June	Berlin	Germany	Olympiastadion	—N/a	65,958 / 65,958	—
26 June	Seville	Spain	Estadio Olímpico de Sevilla	—N/a	50,435 / 60,000	$4,143,863
28 June	Bilbao	Spain	San Mamés Stadium	—N/a	41,759 / 42,387	$3,345,137
Total						$

=== Cancelled dates ===
List of concerts, showing date, city, country, venue, and reason for cancellation
Date	City	Country	Venue	Reason
29 November 2008	Seattle	United States	KeyArena	—N/a
3 March 2009	Antwerp	Belgium	Sportpaleis	Brian Johnson falling ill
10 July 2009	Stuttgart	Germany	Cannstatter Wasen	Schedule changes
4 September 2009	Los Angeles	United States	Staples Center	—N/a
1 October 2009	Phoenix	United States	Talking Stick Resort Arena	Brian Johnson resting from a medical procedure
December 2009	Lima	Peru	National Stadium of Peru	Stadium unavailability
2 December 2009	Santiago	Chile	Estadio Nacional Julio Martínez Prádanos	Logistics not meeting the band's production requirements
30 May 2010	Tallinn	Estonia	Song Festival Grounds	—N/a

== Personnel ==
- Brian Johnson – lead vocals
- Angus Young – lead guitar, backing vocals on "Dirty Deeds Done Dirt Cheap" and "T.N.T"
- Malcolm Young – rhythm guitar, backing vocals
- Cliff Williams – bass guitar, backing vocals
- Phil Rudd – drums

== See also ==
- List of highest-grossing concert tours
- List of most-attended concert tours
