= Partizan Stadium =

Association football and track and field athletics stadium in Belgrade, Serbia

- JNA; Humska (supporters) ("The Temple of Football")
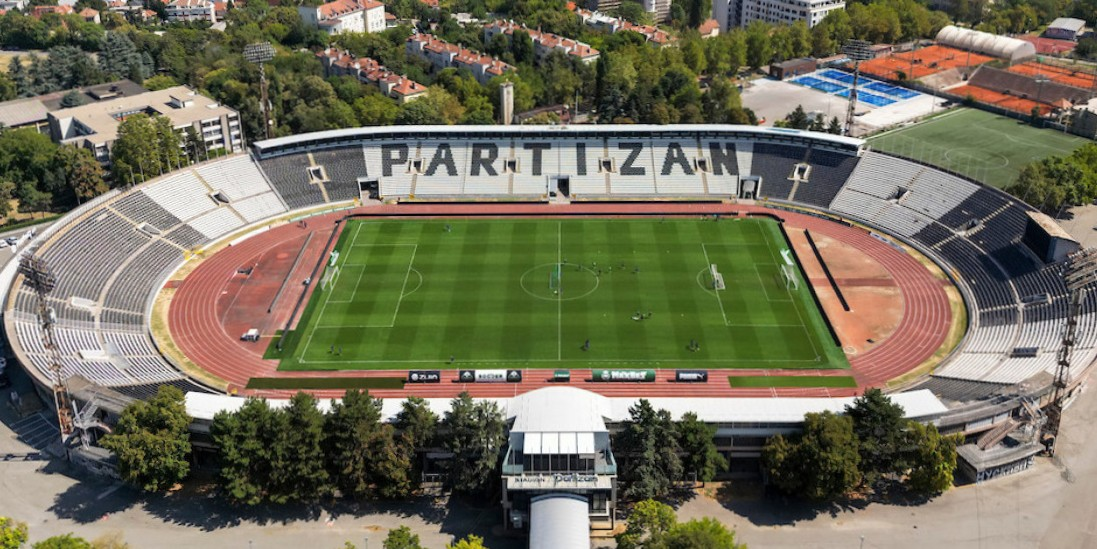
- UEFA

- Location within Belgrade
- Full name: Partizan Stadium
- Former names: JNA Stadium (1951–1989)
- Location: Autokomanda, Belgrade, Serbia
- Coordinates: 44°47′19.48″N 20°27′32.75″E
- Owner: Partizan Belgrade
- Operator: Partizan Belgrade
- Capacity: 29,775; 40,000 (concerts)
- Type: UEFA Category 3 Stadium
- Surface: GrassMaster
- Scoreboard: LED
- Field size: 105 m × 68 m (344 ft × 223 ft)

Construction
- Built: 1948–1951
- Opened: 22 December 1951
- Renovated: 1998, 2010, 2014, 2015
- Architect: Mika Janković

Tenants
- Partizan Belgrade (1949–present); Red Star Belgrade (1960–1963); Serbia national football team: Major sporting events hosted; 1962 European Athletics Championships; 2009 Universiade Football; 2027 UEFA European Under-21 Championship

The Partizan Stadium (Serbian: Стадион Партизан / Stadion Partizan) is a football and track-and-field stadium in Autokomanda, Belgrade, Serbia. The home ground of FK Partizan, it was formerly known as JNA Stadium (Stadion JNA / Стадион ЈНА) after the Yugoslav People's Army (JNA), which it is still colloquially known as by fans in the former SFR Yugoslavia.

Its current capacity is 29,662, having previously held 50,000 people before conversion to an all-seater stadium.

== History ==
Construction of the stadium was started after World War II, on the site of BSK Stadion, which was a 25,000-seat stadium that hosted the Yugoslavia national team as well as BSK Beograd. The stadium was built with the help of the Yugoslav People's Army, in the period between 1948 and 1951. Although the stadium was not completely finished, the first match was Yugoslavia against France on 9 October 1949, which ended 1–1. The ground was officially opened on Yugoslav People's Army Day, on 22 December 1951.

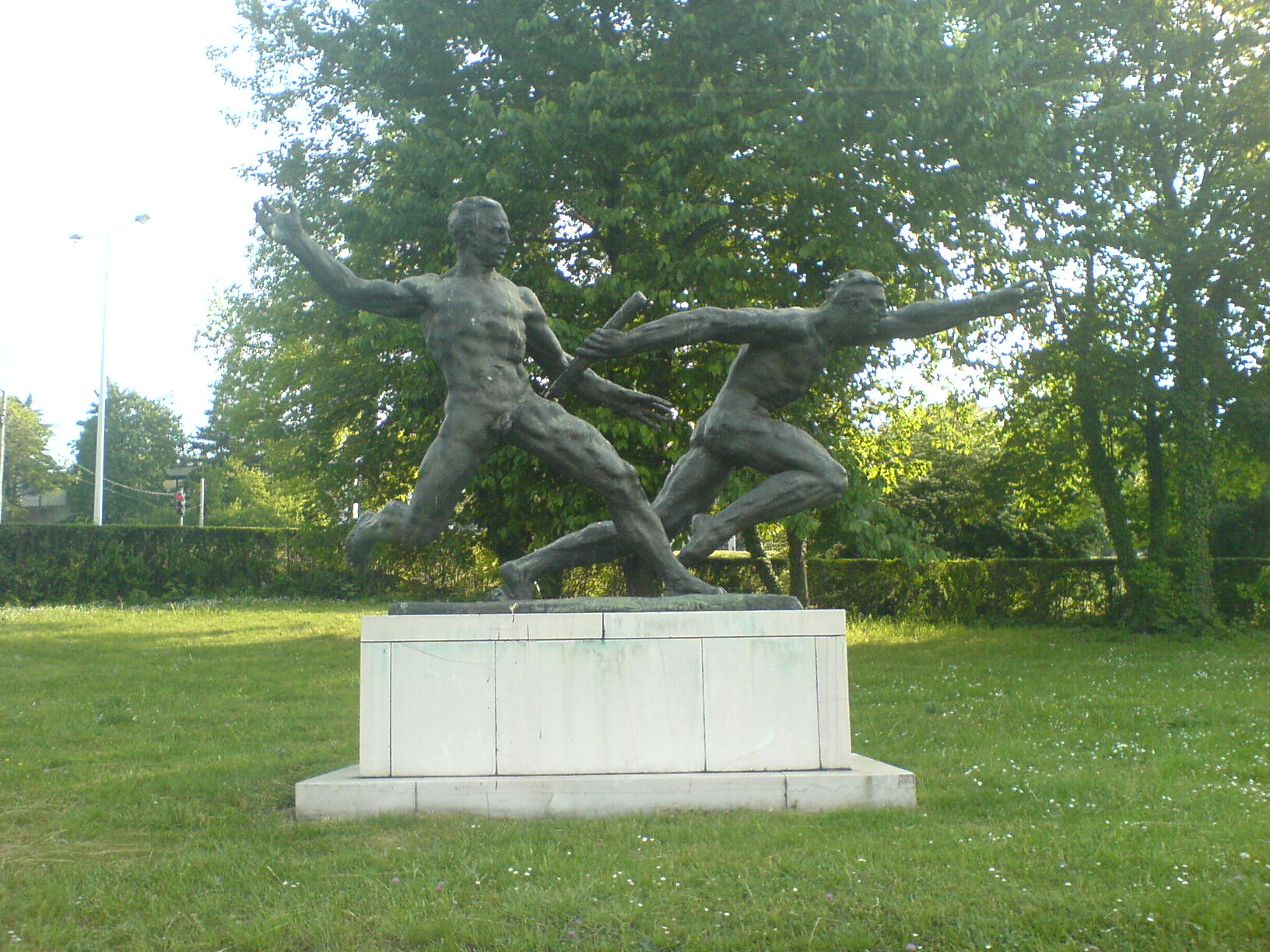
Monument to relay carriers near Partizan Stadium

From 1957 to 1987 the stadium was the site of the annual Youth Day parade. Every year on 25 May the Relay of Youth was held in the Socialist Federal Republic of Yugoslavia. Participants carried a baton with a birthday message to President Josip Broz Tito. The Relay of Youth was a symbolic relay race which started in Tito's birth town Kumrovec and went through all major towns and cities of the country, ending in Belgrade at the JNA Stadium. On 1 April 1957, the stadium received its first electronic scoreboard. It was used for the first time in a match between Partizan and Vardar Skopje on 30 November 1957.

The stadium was a site of the 7th European Athletics Championship which was held from 12 to 16 September 1962.

In April 1989, Partizan Belgrade purchased the stadium from the Yugoslav People's Army, and thus became the owner. The name of the stadium were officially changed to Partizan Stadium. The Partizan Stadium had a 50,000 capacity before the new UEFA security regulations came into effect. There were 15,924 seats, 33,000 standing places and 585 box seats. It was renovated in 1998, and has had a capacity of 29,775 since.

The stadium hosted Partizan in their first-ever UEFA Champions League, the 2003-04 edition. In the qualifiers they eliminated Bobby Robson's Newcastle United; losing 0–1 in Belgrade, but in the rematch at St James' Park they won with Ivica Iliev's goal in regular time and reached the group stages after a penalty shoot-out. Despite being drawn in a tough group with Real Madrid (the previous year's semi-finalist), Porto (the winner of the 2002–03 UEFA Cup and the eventual winner of the competition) and Marseille (the eventual runners-up of the 2003–04 UEFA Cup)., the stadium proved a tough ground for the opposition and the team did not lose a home game, playing out a 0–0 draw with Real Madrid's famous Galácticos, which included players such as Zinedine Zidane, Ronaldo, Luís Figo, Roberto Carlos, Raúl and David Beckham; a 1–1 draw with Porto, led by coach José Mourinho; and Marseille, with its superstars Fabien Barthez and Didier Drogba, while playing some inspired football in the away matches at Madrid (0–1), Marseille (0–3) and Porto (1–2).

In September 2010, the Partizan Stadium was reorganized in a few places for the UEFA Champions League. Due to UEFA stadium standards, the fences on the eastern and western stands were shortened from 2.25m to 0.70m. The football pitch was extended by 1 square meter. New, modern goal-posts were mounted, and brand new media boxes were constructed on top of the western stand. Partizan's Champions League game against Arsenal on 20 September 2010 was almost postponed due to two of the stadium's floodlights failing. However, one of them was fixed and the referee, Wolfgang Stark gave consent for the match to be played with only 3 floodlights.

In March 2012, the old scoreboard was replaced with a new LED display after 55 years of service. On 7 September 2012, Partizan Belgrade announced a sponsorship agreement between the Carlsberg Group and the club, which also included the placement of black and white chairs across the whole stadium.

== Structures and facilities ==
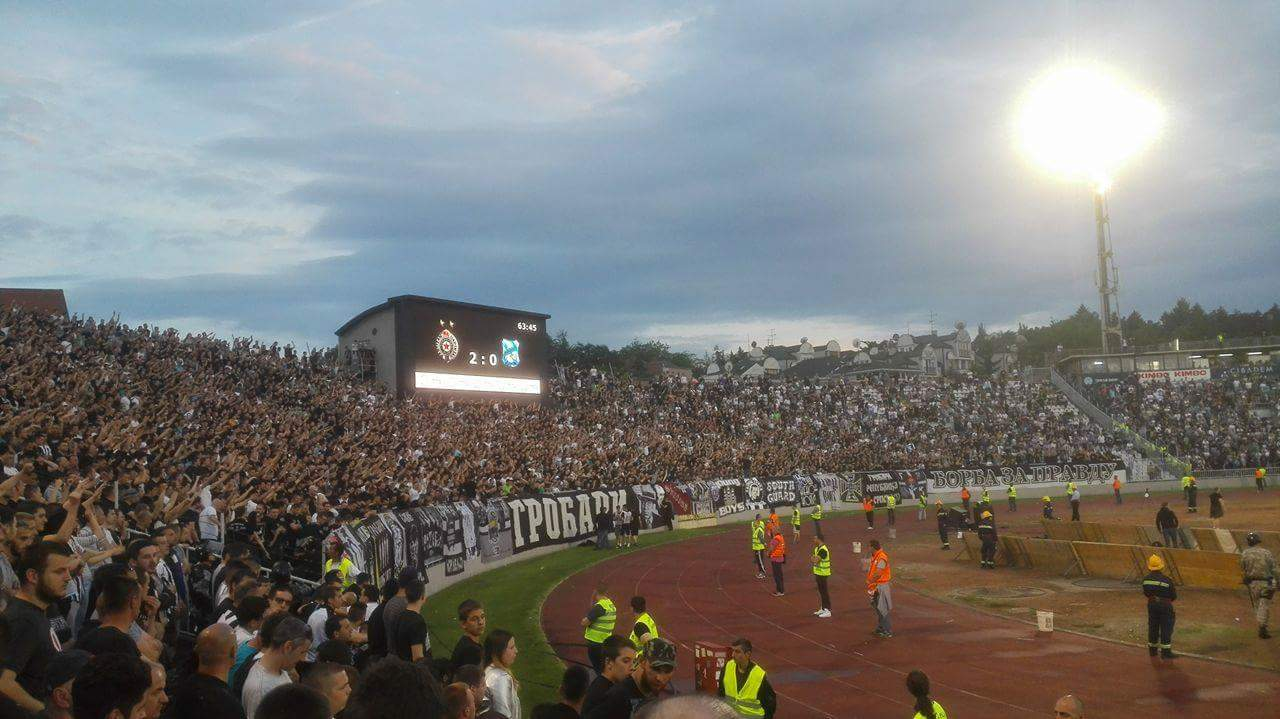
Grobari at the south stand.

The Partizan Stadium has 29,775 seats split between four stands: the south, north, west and east. The stands have a height of 21 metres (69 ft) and a span of 236 metres (774 ft) in length (north-south) and 150 metres (490 ft) in width (east-west). There are 30 rows of seats and 30 entry and exit gates for spectators. The playing field measures 105 by 68 metres (344 ft × 223 ft), and is illuminated at 1,400 lux (Philips). The stadium has athletic trace, two grass fields, a training court with locker rooms, press center and restaurant. Within the stadium complex is also 18 tennis courts, boxing hall, shooting range, gym, medical center and commercial area.

== Proposed new stadium ==
In 2006, the current stadium was to be redesigned by Swiss firm Mob Lab. The capacity of the new Partizan stadium would have been approximately 38,000 seats with a modern business park filled with hotels, office buildings, tennis courts and multiplex cinema.

== Other uses ==
Beside sport events, the stadium is also a place for various concerts and shows. The stadium facilities and acoustics meet demands of local artists and international superstars.

- Bijelo Dugme headlined a day-long event, called "Rock spektakl '79", at the stadium on 22 September 1979. Other acts to appear on the day were YU grupa, Galija, Siluete, Generacija 5, Parni Valjak, Suncokret, Prljavo Kazalište, Tomaž Domicelj, Obećanje Proljeća, Metak, Revolver, Prva Ljubav, Senad od Bosne, Opus, Čisti Zrak, Aerodrom, Peta Rijeka, Formula 4, Mama Rock, Kako, Rok Apoteka, Kilo i po, and Crni Petak.
- Metallica performed at the stadium during their Madly in Anger with the World Tour on 15 June 2004, with Van Gogh as the opening act, in front of approximately 25,000 people.
- AC/DC performed at the stadium during their Black Ice World Tour on 26 May 2009, with Amajlija and The Answer as their opening acts, in front of 32,716 people.

== See also ==
- SC Partizan-Teleoptik

== Gallery ==
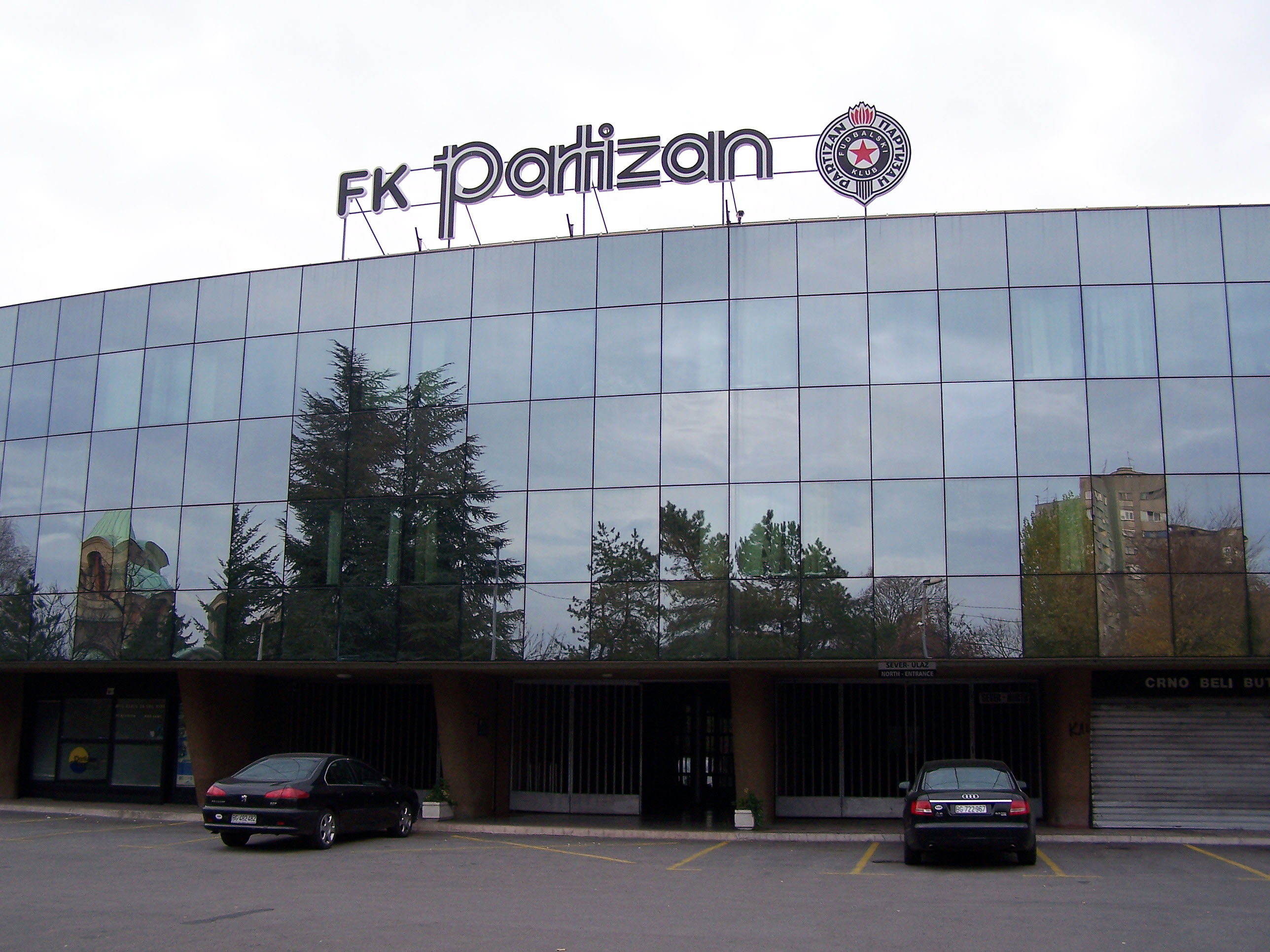
Front of the northern stand

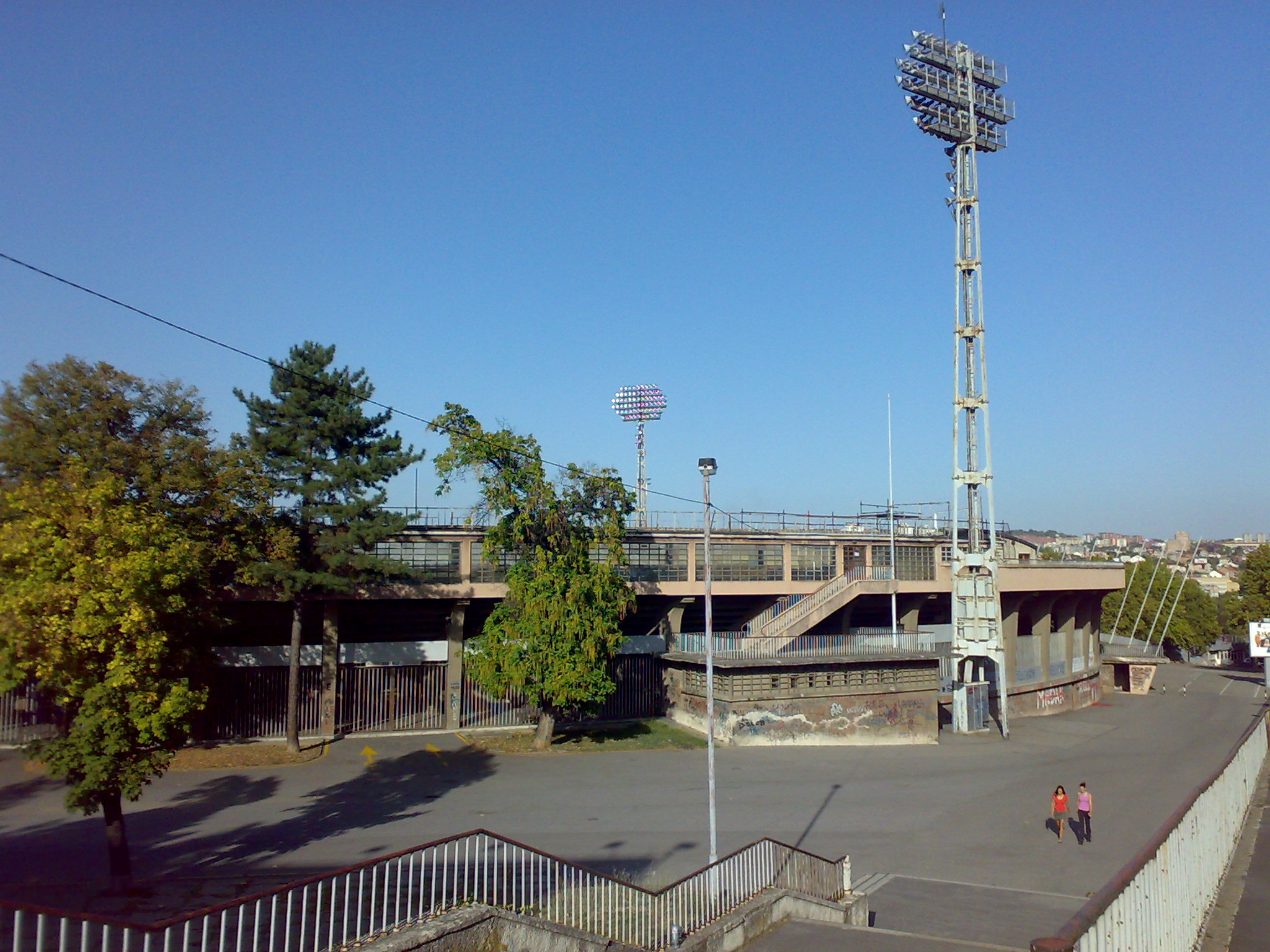
Front of the southern stand

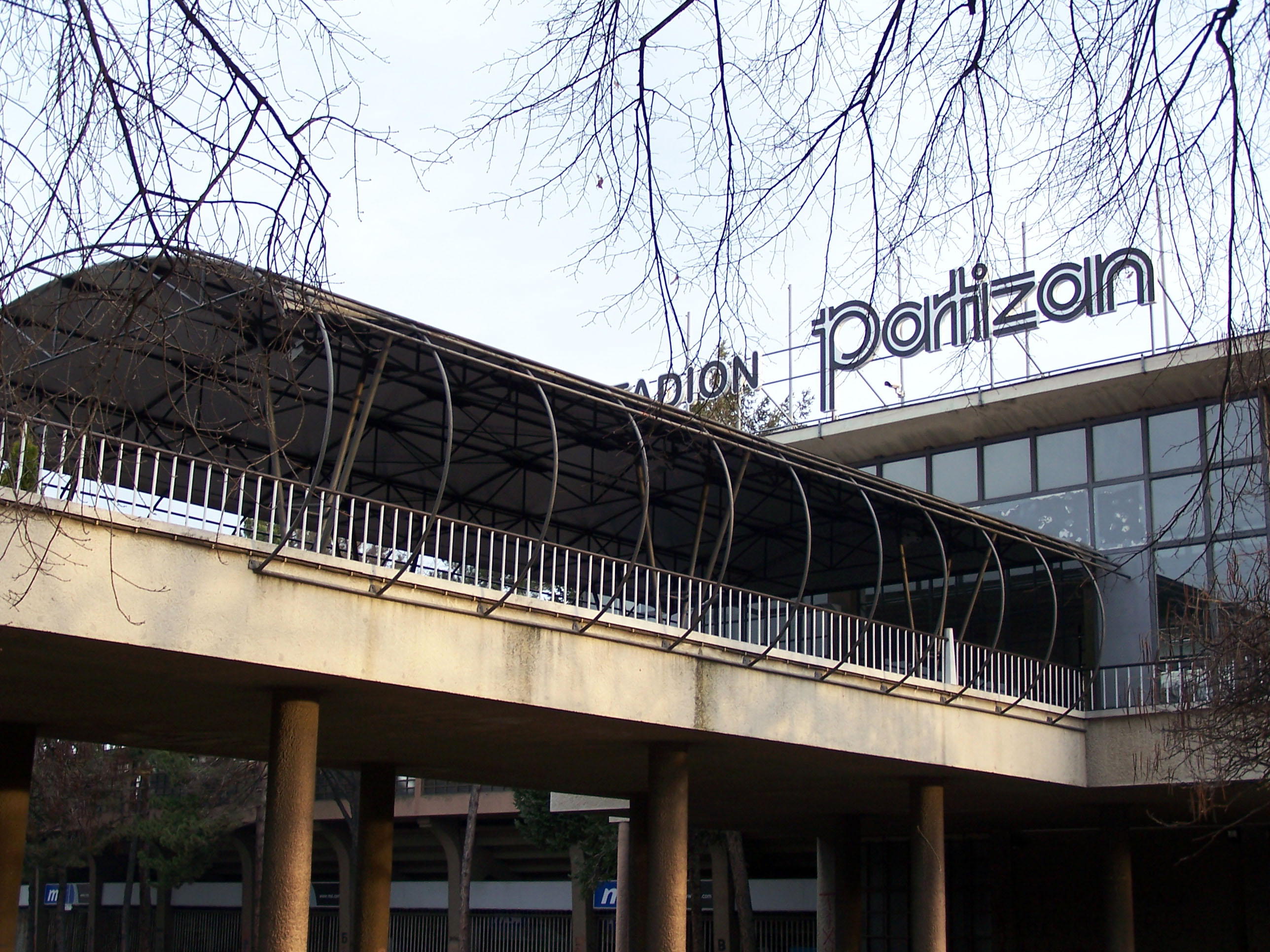
Main Entrance

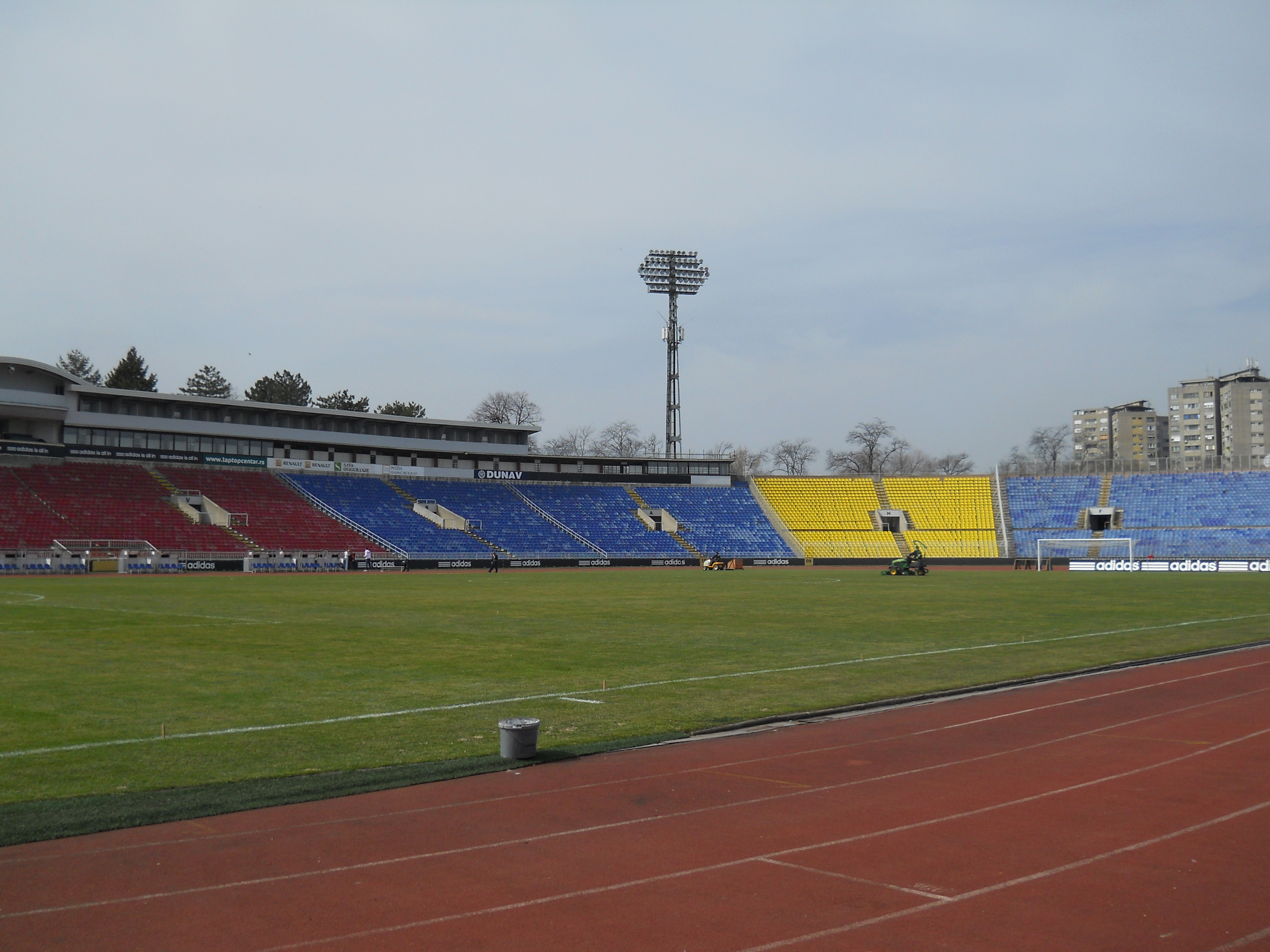
Western and northern stand

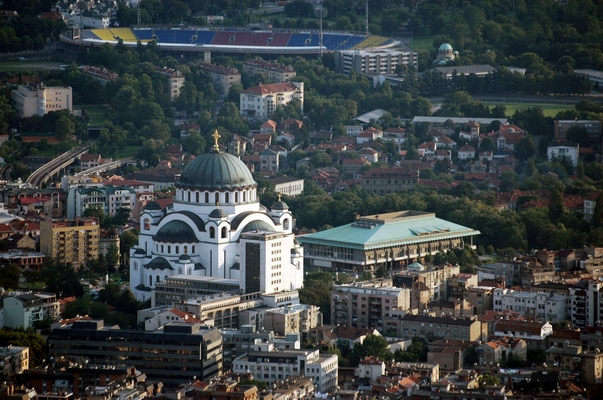
Cathedral of Saint Sava and Partizan Stadium

Preceded by Olympic Stadium; Stockholm	European Athletics Championships; Main Venue; 1962	Succeeded by Népstadion; Budapest
