= Black Ice (album) =

2008 studio album by AC/DC

Studio album by AC/DC
- Released: 17 October 2008
- Recorded: 3 March – 25 April 2008
- Studio: The Warehouse (Vancouver)
- Genre: Hard rock
- Length: 55:38
- Label: Columbia
- Producer: Brendan O'Brien

AC/DC chronology
Stiff Upper Lip (2000)	Black Ice (2008)	Backtracks (2009)

Singles from Black Ice
- 1. "Rock 'n' Roll Train" Released: 28 August 2008; 2. "Big Jack" Released: 18 December 2008; 3. "Anything Goes" Released: 25 February 2009; 4. "Money Made" Released: 5 July 2009

Black Ice is the fifteenth studio album by the Australian rock band AC/DC. First released in Europe on 17 October 2008 and released internationally on 20 October 2008, it was produced by Brendan O'Brien. It marked the band's first original recordings since Stiff Upper Lip (2000), with the eight-year gap being the longest between AC/DC's successive studio albums. The album was the band's final studio release to feature founding rhythm guitarist Malcolm Young, who left the band in September 2014 after being diagnosed with dementia, and died three years later.

The album's development was delayed because bass guitarist Cliff Williams sustained an injury and the band changed labels from Elektra Records to Sony Music. The first composing sessions between guitarists/brothers Angus and Malcolm Young were in London in 2003. Recording happened during March and April 2008 at The Warehouse Studio in Vancouver, British Columbia, Canada. O'Brien tried to recapture the rock sound of the band's early work, as opposed to the blues orientation of Stiff Upper Lip, with suggestions such as adding "soul crooning" to Brian Johnson's singing. The songs were mostly recorded live in the studio; engineer Mike Fraser used only sparse overdubs and effects to keep the tracks as close to the originals as possible.

Black Ice was released exclusively in physical formats, as the group did not sell its music digitally at the time. Wal-Mart received exclusive rights to distribute the album in North America. Its release was promoted with an extensive marketing campaign, which included displays of AC/DC memorabilia. The four singles issued from the album were, "Rock 'n' Roll Train", "Big Jack", "Anything Goes", and "Money Made". Black Ice peaked at number one in 29 countries, including Australia, Canada, the United Kingdom, Germany and the United States. It was the second best-selling record of 2008, behind Coldplay's Viva La Vida or Death and All His Friends and had shipped 6 million copies worldwide by December. Critical reviews were generally positive, praising the music and its resemblance to the classic AC/DC sound, although some critics found the work too long and inconsistent. The track "War Machine" won the Best Hard Rock Performance category at the 52nd Annual Grammy Awards. The album itself was nominated for many awards, including the Grammy, Brit, Juno and ARIA Music Awards; and was supported by a world tour between 2008 and 2010.

== Background and production ==
Black Ice is AC/DC's fifteenth studio album release in Australia and their fourteenth international release. The band took a break after finishing the Stiff Upper Lip World Tour in 2001, and resumed performing in 2003, with eight presentations that included AC/DC's induction into the Rock and Roll Hall of Fame and they opened three concerts for The Rolling Stones' Licks Tour. During those two years, guitarists Angus Young and Malcolm Young wrote music separately, then met in a London studio to work on new songs.

The production of Black Ice was delayed for several reasons. AC/DC left their label Elektra Records, signed a deal with Sony Music and changed labels within Sony from Epic Records to Columbia Records. Bass guitarist Cliff Williams suffered an injury to his hand in 2005 and was unable to play for 18 months. While Williams was recovering, the Young brothers perfected the songs they had written. Angus revealed that there was no pressure from Sony for the band to release a new album, as the label was releasing DVDs and remasters of the AC/DC catalogue, and thus the group "could afford to sit back and say we'll do another album when we think we've got all the goods." In a 2004 interview, vocalist Brian Johnson said that Angus had written harder riffs than those on Stiff Upper Lip and that he would be writing song lyrics for the first time since the band's 1988 album Blow Up Your Video, but his input would end up minimal, with all tracks on Black Ice credited to the Youngs. Johnson explained that the brothers had done most of the lyrical job, and his collaboration was that he "helped with melody and just filling in gaps that I thought needed filling in".

While producer Robert John "Mutt" Lange expressed an interest in working again with AC/DC, his schedule did not allow this. When the Young brothers called Columbia Records' president Steve Barnett to announce the making of a new album, Barnett recommended producer Brendan O'Brien. Angus said the band had considered talking to O'Brien since the 1990s, as "he seemed to us a very competent professional" and because he and the band would benefit from working with a producer they had not worked with before.

On 3 March 2008, recording started at The Warehouse Studio in Vancouver, where Stiff Upper Lip was recorded, and lasted for eight weeks. Engineer Mike Fraser, who has mixed all AC/DC albums since The Razors Edge, said they recorded in batches of three songs to "keep things interesting" and to avoid overextended sessions. According to Fraser, the band had not rehearsed the songs before entering the studio. Despite "a couple of tweaks in the writing, sparkling up the choruses a bit better" during the recording, the compositions were mostly complete. Still, the Young brothers had new ideas during production, including the song "Anything Goes", which was written when the studio sessions were nearly finished. The songs were mostly recorded live in the studio; the instruments and backing vocals were recorded in the live room, and the lead vocals were recorded in both the control room and an overdubbing booth. The performances were first recorded with analogue equipment, as Fraser considers that tape conveys "the sound of rock & roll", and then digitised for mixing and overdubs. Fraser avoided altering the original recordings – "I used Pro Tools purely as a tape machine" – with no effects on the bass and rhythm guitar, sparse delay and reverb effects on the vocals and other instruments, and overdubs only for the lead guitar and vocals.

The first title considered for the album was Runaway Train. Malcolm suggested using a photograph of the 1895 Montparnasse derailment for the cover, but reconsidered after he found that American rock band Mr. Big had used it for their album Lean Into It (1991). According to Angus, Runaway Train was rejected because it had been used by many musicians, including Elton John and Eric Clapton ("Runaway Train"); and Tom Petty ("Runaway Trains"), and he "wanted something unique, new, different". So he suggested Black Ice, which refers to gigs played during winter in Scotland. He said, "it rolled off the tongue" and it reminded him of "radio warnings up north of black ice." Angus was inspired to write the eponymous song by a similar warning heard on his car radio during production.

== Composition ==
The AC/DC music that I remember most is Highway to Hell and Back in Black, which I view as pop songs done in a very heavy ferocious way. Angus and Malcolm were writing songs that had a lot of hooks and my only job was to make a record that made people say, "I've missed AC/DC, and I'm glad they're back."

— Brendan O'Brien

With Black Ice, Brendan O'Brien tried to recapture the rock sound of AC/DC's early work on albums such as Highway to Hell and Dirty Deeds Done Dirt Cheap. He thought the previous studio album, Stiff Upper Lip, was blues-influenced. O'Brien tried to focus on the choruses, which he felt were the best part of the AC/DC songs, and encouraged the band to emphasise the "hooky, melodic side" of its song-writing, which Angus complimented, since he had "never been great with harmonies". Mike Fraser said the band aimed "towards The Razors Edge era, a little bit more up-tempo stuff." O'Brien made suggestions about the band's performance, got Angus to play slide guitar on "Stormy May Day", and told Johnson to swap some screaming for "soul crooning" as Johnson was a soul singer. Johnson was worried that the rest of the band would think this did not suit the band's style of hard rock and roll, but the band was quite receptive. Because of the highly demanding singing style, Johnson only recorded his vocals for one hour a day. The rhythm section continues the basic structure from other AC/DC records; Cliff Williams played bass lines of eighth notes, and Phil Rudd's drumming was a consistent 4/4 time, mostly on his snare, kick drum and hi-hat cymbal. Both musicians expressed contentment with their roles in the band; Rudd said, "I'm not repressing skills. Most drummers are scared to try this", and Williams admitted he plays "the same thing in every song, for the most part", but added "in AC/DC's music, the song is more important than any individual's bit in it".

"Rock 'n' Roll Train"
Sample of the album's lead single, "Rock 'n' Roll Train". The song is centred around guitar riffs and elemental drum beats, and features harmonic backing vocals during the chorus.

Angus said that when composing with Malcolm they share ideas to make each track "work together" to form a complete album, and Johnson added "these songs belong together. It's about five boys having a damn good time in a studio." With 15 songs and a running time of over 55 minutes, Black Ice has the longest running time of any AC/DC studio record. Malcolm said that "about 60 or 70 song ideas" were developed. Angus said that the first attempt to sequence the album resulted in a track list comprising eleven songs, "but as the days went by each band member voted for a new track, and then another, and other one" so they decided to include all the recorded tracks.

Most of the album's tracks are about rock and roll itself–Angus stated, "Certain songs just seem to come to life when you add that phrase". However, other themes served as inspiration. "Money Made" is a criticism on how, according to Angus, in the US "everything is money these days". "War Machine" was based on a documentary on Hannibal, which led to the conclusion that the military has not changed since Ancient Rome. "Wheels" tells about Johnson's passion for motorcars. He described the album's release as the "best one we've done", he felt that while Back in Black was great for its time, Black Ice shows the band's versatility. Angus also said he admired the album's diversity, saying "It is sufficiently varied to please people in varied moods".

== Release and promotion ==
On 18 August 2008, Columbia Records announced that Black Ice would be released on 20 October in the US, and began accepting pre-orders. "Rock 'n' Roll Train" was issued as the first single from the album on 28 August; "Big Jack" and "Anything Goes" followed in some markets, and "Money Made" was an airplay single in Australia and the United Kingdom. The track "Spoilin' for a Fight", was used by the WWE as the theme song for its 2008 Survivor Series event, and "War Machine" would later be included in both a trailer for 2010's Iron Man 2 and the film's soundtrack album, in addition to serving as one of the theme songs for WrestleMania XXV.

The CD version was also available in a hardcover, deluxe edition with a 30-page booklet containing exclusive new illustrations, studio and live photographs of the group and lyrics. A limited edition steel-box version, containing the CD, a 20-page colour booklet, a DVD featuring the "Rock 'n' Roll Train" video and a making of documentary, a large AC/DC flag, five stickers and a Gibson guitar pick, was issued in Germany and the United Kingdom in December. The album was released as a double LP on two 180-gram discs in a gatefold package featuring the standard red lettering artwork on the front. The LP was sold through the official website and through independent record shops in the US. An unknown number of copies of the vinyl version were incorrectly pressed; side 1B had tracks from The Clash's Live at Shea Stadium. Black Ice was not issued digitally as the band refused to sell their tracks separately. Angus declared, "If we were on iTunes, we know a certain percentage of people would only download two or three songs from the album – and we don't think that represents us musically." However, the entire album was leaked online a week before the official release. Rumours spread that Sony Music tried to control leaks by releasing fake tracks on peer-to-peer websites.

Wal-Mart created special stands in their shops to promote AC/DC's Black Ice in North America.

In North America, Wal-Mart made a deal for the exclusive distribution of Black Ice, though a few independent music shops ordered copies of the album from foreign outlets. Angus declared that the band chose Wal-Mart because the company is the biggest physical music retailer in America, which they believed to be "the best alternative to iTunes". He also said, "There aren't as many record stores these days, and Wal-Marts are all over America. New York and Los Angeles and Chicago may be covered, but in the heartland of America, Wal-Mart may be the only gig in town." Wal-Mart created over 3000 "Rock Again AC/DC Stores" with displays showcasing the band's albums, branded clothing, the No Bull DVD, the video game AC/DC Live: Rock Band, and products from sponsors. Gary Severson, a Wal-Mart senior vice president, said that AC/DC was one of the rare artists whose loyal fan-base allowed them to display other merchandise along with the music. In October, MTV, Wal-Mart and Columbia created "AC/DC Rock Band Stores" in cities without regular Wal-Mart retail locations–New York's Times Square and Los Angeles. "Black Ice" trucks were dispatched on the streets of these cities after the release, playing tracks and making stops each day to sell merchandise. Advertising agency Arnold Worldwide was awarded both Best Activity Generating Brand Volume by the Marketing Agencies Association, and Best Retail/Co-Marketing Campaign by Promo Magazine for Black Ice's marketing campaign.

A digital version of Black Ice was made available on iTunes, along with the rest of AC/DC's catalogue, on 19 November 2012.

=== Tour ===
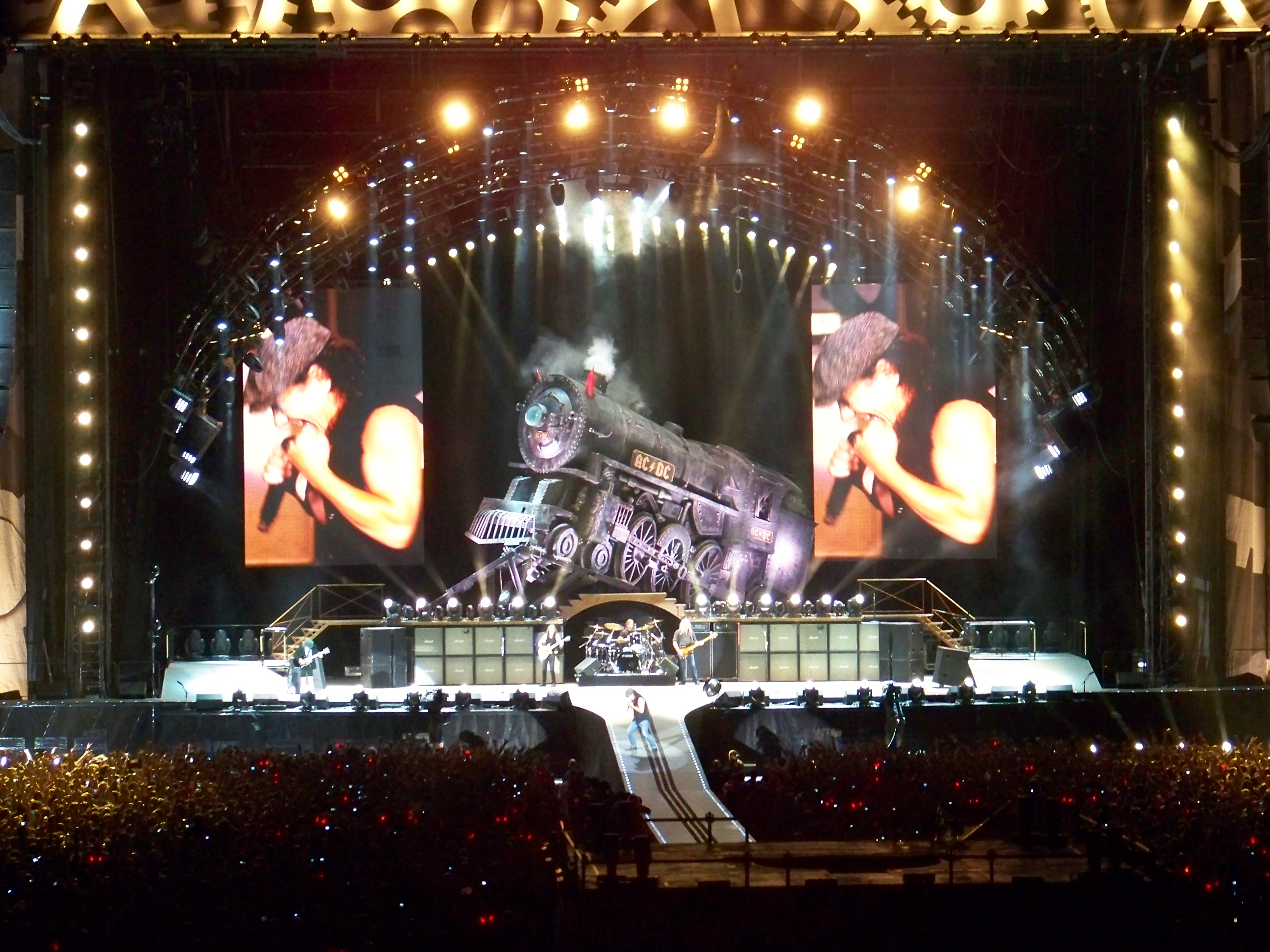
AC/DC on-stage, Black Ice World Tour, Madrid, Spain, 5 June 2009

To promote Black Ice, AC/DC launched the Black Ice World Tour on 28 October 2008 in Wilkes-Barre, Pennsylvania. Two days earlier, they had held a dress rehearsal in the same city. The tour lasted for 168 shows in 11 legs, with the last in Bilbao, Spain, on 28 June 2010.

Mark Fisher, who had worked on the Stiff Upper Lip World Tour, designed the stage. The set's centrepiece was a full size locomotive, weighing 3500 kg, that was inspired by the working title Runaway Train and the track "Rock 'n' Roll Train". Five songs from Black Ice were included on the tour's set list; "Rock 'n' Roll Train", "Big Jack", "Black Ice", "War Machine", and "Anything Goes".

The Black Ice World Tour was AC/DC's most successful, grossing $441.6 million, making it the fourteenth highest-grossing concert tour of all-time. Three concerts in December 2009 at the River Plate Stadium in Buenos Aires were released as the DVD Live at River Plate on 10 May 2011.

== Packaging ==
The cover art of Black Ice was drawn by Joshua Marc Levy, art director for Columbia and a longtime fan of the band who volunteered for the project among "many people at Sony who desired to work on it". There are four different covers; the standard edition has a red logo, the deluxe edition has a blue logo, and two variants to the regular design include yellow or white logos. Angus said the options were not to deliver the message that fans would need to purchase all covers. He said, "We know most people will only purchase the record once, in their colour of choice. For me, it's not relevant. What matters is that fans enjoy it. Music is the essence."

After working with the cover for the album, provisionally titled Runaway Train, Levy went on vacation and travelled with Pearl Jam on their 2008 tour. After a concert in Washington D.C., Levy came up with the idea "to do it all graphic black on black" and sketched what would become the yellow artwork. The record company liked it and requested he do two more in the same style, which became the red and white versions. During the promotional photography sessions, Levy made the deluxe edition art. The tracks on the album did not have much influence on the artwork as Levy had heard "maybe 5 songs at that point", but he found it curious that his artwork fit the title track "Black Ice", which was not among the tracks he had heard. Levy said that since the album had many similarities with Back in Black – "Black" in the title, dark covers, and AC/DC resurfacing with a sound based on the band's early work – the art was "like a time travel, which is why there are so many psychedelic drawings". The artwork's resemblance to a train, echoing lead single "Rock N' Roll Train", was a coincidence, given Levy "never thought of it that way". Atop the image there is a cog with an image of Angus with his fist in the air resembling the statue on Stiff Upper Lip, because Levy "just thought it was great as a continuing icon." The photographs for the booklet and promotional photography were taken by music photographer Guido Karp, in August 2008 in London.

== Critical reception ==
Professional ratings
Aggregate scores
Source	Rating
Metacritic	69/100
Review scores
Source	Rating
AllMusic	3/5 stars
The A.V. Club	A−
Entertainment Weekly	B−
The Guardian	3/5 stars
IGN	7.2/10
Mojo	4/5 stars
The Observer	4/5 stars
PopMatters	8/10
Rolling Stone	3.5/5 stars
Spin	7/10

Critical reviews of Black Ice were generally favourable according to Metacritic, which provided a normalised rating of 69 out of 100 based on 24 reviews from mainstream critics. Most reviewers complimented the album's sound, with The Village Voice's Richard Bienstock considering that Brendan O'Brien's production restored a sonority closer to the Vanda and Young produced 1970s albums and effective choruses like those with "Mutt" Lange, and Aaron Burgess of The A.V. Club finding Black Ice the most inspired AC/DC album since The Razors Edge while sounding "harder, hungrier, and more relevant than anything on contemporary radio."

"There's a sense of purpose to this new album that far outstrips its predecessor, Stiff Upper Lip," wrote Paul Eliott in a 7/10 review for Classic Rock. "It sounds bigger and better. It has more energy, more vibe. There's more craft to it, stronger songs, catchier hooks. It is, in short, their best album since… well, the one after Back in Black."

A common argument was that Black Ice succeeded because AC/DC did not want to change the style that succeeded in previous albums. Bernard Zuel of The Sydney Morning Herald declared that "almost all of [the tracklist] could have appeared on any AC/DC album of the past 28 years". Chris Jones of the BBC said the band's "almost platonic form of rock 'n' boogie that was hand built to last" remains because they "have no reason to tinker with a formula that was well-nigh perfect to begin with". Writers such as Spin's David Marchese and The Observer's Peter Kimpton complimented the band's attempts at "some new sonic tricks", such as the slide guitar of "Stormy May Day" and the quieter "Decibel".

However, some reviewers found the album inconsistent, overly long or formulaic. Black Ice was described as a retread of other AC/DC albums without the same inspiration, with Spence D. of IGN declaring that "the band sounds tight, but very few of the songs actually resonate with that sense of classicism found on much of their earlier efforts", The Austin Chronicle's Austin Powell feeling that despite "a few cheap thrills" the album lacked "the urgent indecency and iron force that defined the Bon Scott era", and AllMusic's Stephen Thomas Erlewine considering that after "Big Jack" the tracks went into a "too-comfortable groove, fueled by too-tight rhythms and guitars that sound loud but not beefy". Many complained about the lack of variation, made more flagrant by the long track list. Entertainment Weekly's reviewer Clark Collis wrote that "even 2000's fairly monochromatic Stiff Upper Lip had more varied material", Brian Hiatt of Rolling Stone felt that Black Ice "feels longer than its 55 minutes, thanks to a stretch of throwaway rockers", and Robert Forster of The Monthly thought that a shorter running time would "maximise the album's impact", given he found the first four songs and the title track the best for sounding more diverse, while the other tracks were let down by poor songwriting and a "numbing predictability".

== Commercial performance ==
Black Ice made history by debuting at number one on album charts of 29 countries, and is Columbia Records' biggest debut album since Nielsen SoundScan began tracking sales data for Billboard in March 1991. Black Ice was the second best-selling album worldwide in 2008, behind Coldplay's Viva La Vida or Death and All His Friends. As of December 2008, it had shipped six million copies worldwide, and earned sales certifications in 24 countries, with multi-platinum status in eight, platinum in twelve more, and gold in the four remaining.

On the first day of its US release, 20 October 2008, Black Ice sold over 193,000 units. By 28 October, Black Ice debuted at number one on the US Billboard 200 albums chart, selling over 784,000 copies in its first week, the second highest one-week sales of an album in the US of 2008, behind Lil Wayne's Tha Carter III. It was AC/DC's second release to top the US charts, after For Those About to Rock We Salute You (1981) and became the biggest debut ever by a mainstream hard rock album. As of 31 December 2008, the album had sold 1.915 million copies in the US, according to Nielsen SoundScan, and was certified 2× Platinum by the RIAA. Black Ice also debuted at number one on the ARIA Album Charts, selling over 90,000 units, and the UK Album charts, with 110,000 copies sold. It was their first number one in the UK since Back in Black (1980). In Canada, Black Ice debuted at number one and sold 119,000 copies in its first week, making it the best-selling album debut in Canada in 2008. The album held the top spot in Canada for three consecutive weeks, with sales of over 200,000 copies. In Germany, Black Ice became the 14th best-selling album of the 2000s, with sales of 1 million copies and being certified 5 times platinum.

Black Ice was ranked 41st on Rolling Stone's Top 50 Albums of 2008 list, 29th on a similar list by Q magazine, 17th on Kerrang!'s Top 20 Albums of the Year and 3rd in UGO's list of the 11 Best Metal Albums of 2008. At the ARIA Music Awards of 2009, Black Ice won in the categories of Best Rock Album and Highest Selling Album; it was nominated for Album of the Year and AC/DC were nominated for Group of the Year. It was nominated for Best International Album at the Juno Awards and the Brit Awards. It won the 2009 Classic Rock Roll of Honour Award for Album of the Year. At the 51st Grammy Awards in 2009, "Rock 'n' Roll Train" was nominated for Best Rock Performance by a Duo or Group with Vocal, and at the 2010 ceremony, Black Ice was nominated for Best Rock Album and the track "War Machine" won the Best Hard Rock Performance category. At the APRA Awards of 2010 Angus and Malcolm won Songwriters of the Year, and "Rock 'n' Roll Train" won Most Played Australian Work Overseas.

== Track listing ==
All tracks are written by Angus Young and Malcolm Young.

Black Ice track listing
No.	Title	Length
1.	"Rock 'n' Roll Train"	4:21
2.	"Skies on Fire"	3:34
3.	"Big Jack"	3:57
4.	"Anything Goes"	3:22
5.	"War Machine"	3:09
6.	"Smash 'n' Grab"	4:06
7.	"Spoilin' for a Fight"	3:17
8.	"Wheels"	3:28
9.	"Decibel"	3:34
10.	"Stormy May Day"	3:10
11.	"She Likes Rock 'n' Roll"	3:53
12.	"Money Made"	4:15
13.	"Rock 'n' Roll Dream"	4:41
14.	"Rocking All the Way"	3:22
15.	"Black Ice"	3:25
Total length:		55:38

== Personnel ==
Credits adapted from the album's liner notes, and Sound on Sound.

AC/DC

- Brian Johnson – lead vocals
- Angus Young – lead guitar
- Malcolm Young – rhythm guitar, backing vocals
- Cliff Williams – bass guitar, backing vocals
- Phil Rudd – drums

Production

- Brendan O'Brien – production, backing vocals
- Mike Fraser – engineering, mixing
- Eric Mosher – engineering assistance
- Billy Bowers – additional engineering
- Richard Jones – equipment technician
- Geoff Banks – equipment technician
- Rick St. Pierre – equipment technician
- George Marino – mastering
- Guido Karp – photography
- Joshua Marc Levy – art direction, design, illustrations (containing vector graphics by You Work For Them, LLC)

== Charts ==
=== Weekly charts ===
Chart performance for Black Ice
Chart (2008)	Peak position
Argentine Albums (CAPIF)	1
Australian Albums (ARIA)	1
Austrian Albums (Ö3 Austria)	1
Belgian Albums (Ultratop Flanders)	1
Belgian Albums (Ultratop Wallonia)	1
Canadian Albums (Billboard)	1
Czech Albums (ČNS IFPI)	1
Danish Albums (Hitlisten)	1
Dutch Albums (Album Top 100)	3
Finnish Albums (Suomen virallinen lista)	1
French Albums (SNEP)	1
German Albums (Offizielle Top 100)	1
Greek Albums (IFPI Greece)	1
Hungarian Albums (MAHASZ)	1
Irish Albums (IRMA)	1
Italian Albums (FIMI)	1
Japanese Albums (Oricon)	3
Mexican Albums (AMPROFON)	3
New Zealand Albums (RMNZ)	1
Norwegian Albums (VG-lista)	1
Polish Albums (ZPAV)	1
Portuguese Albums (AFP)	2
Scottish Albums (Official Charts)	1
Slovenian Albums (IFPI)	1
Spanish Albums (Promusicae)	1
Swedish Albums (Sverigetopplistan)	1
Swiss Albums (Schweizer Hitparade)	1
UK Albums (Official Charts)	1
UK Rock & Metal Albums (Official Charts)	1
US Billboard 200	1
US Top Rock Albums (Billboard)	1

=== Year-end charts ===
2008 year-end chart performance for Black Ice
Chart (2008)	Position
Australian Albums (ARIA)	3
Austrian Albums (Ö3 Austria)	5
Belgian Albums (Ultratop Flanders)	10
Belgian Albums (Ultratop Wallonia)	14
Belgian Alternative Albums (Ultratop Flanders)	6
Canadian Albums (Billboard)	5
Danish Albums (Hitlisten)	6
Dutch Albums (Album Top 100)	30
European Albums (Billboard)	17
Finnish Albums (Suomen viralinen lista)	2
French Albums (SNEP)	8
German Albums (Offizielle Top 100)	7
Greek Albums (IFPI)	32
Greek Foreign Albums (IFPI Greece)	7
Hungarian Albums (MAHASZ)	6
Irish Albums (IRMA)	20
Italian Albums (FIMI)	19
New Zealand Albums (RMNZ)	12
Spanish Albums (PROMUSICAE)	25
Swedish Albums (Sverigetopplistan)	4
Swiss Albums (Schweizer Hitparade)	3
UK Albums (OCC)	25
US Billboard 200	15
US Top Rock Albums (Billboard)	5

2009 year-end chart performance for Black Ice
Chart (2009)	Position
Australian Albums (ARIA)	37
Austrian Albums (Ö3 Austria)	7
Belgian Albums (Ultratop Flanders)	27
Belgian Albums (Ultratop Wallonia)	34
Belgian Alternative Albums (Ultratop Flanders)	12
Canadian Albums (Billboard)	13
Danish Albums (Hitlisten)	44
Dutch Albums (Album Top 100)	63
European Albums (Billboard)	7
French Albums (SNEP)	57
German Albums (Offizielle Top 100)	13
Italian Albums (FIMI)	68
Spanish Albums (PROMUSICAE)	45
Swedish Albums (Sverigetopplistan)	88
Swiss Albums (Schweizer Hitparade)	26
UK Albums (OCC)	198
US Billboard 200	31
US Top Rock Albums (Billboard)	11

=== Decade-end chart ===
2000–2009 decade-end chart performance for Black Ice
Chart (2000–2009)	Position
Australian Albums (ARIA)	36

== Certifications and sales ==
Region	Certification	Certified units/sales
Argentina (CAPIF)	2× Platinum	80,000^{^}
Australia (ARIA)	5× Platinum	350,000^{^}
Austria (IFPI Austria)	3× Platinum	60,000^{*}
Belgium (BRMA)	2× Platinum	60,000^{*}
Brazil (Pro-Música Brasil)	2× Platinum	120,000^{‡}
Canada (Music Canada)	5× Platinum	341,000
Denmark (IFPI Danmark)	4× Platinum	80,000^{‡}
Finland (Musiikkituottajat)	2× Platinum	49,660
France (SNEP)	2× Platinum	400,000^{*}
Germany (BVMI)	5× Platinum	1,000,000^{^}
Greece (IFPI Greece)	Platinum	15,000^{^}
Hungary (MAHASZ)	2× Platinum	12,000^{^}
Ireland (IRMA)	2× Platinum	30,000^{^}
Italy 2008 sales	—	150,000
Italy (FIMI) sales since 2009	Gold	30,000^{*}
Japan	—	54,064
Netherlands (NVPI)	Platinum	60,000^{^}
New Zealand (RMNZ)	2× Platinum	30,000^{^}
Poland (ZPAV)	Platinum	20,000^{*}
Portugal (AFP)	Gold	10,000^{^}
Russia (NFPF)	Platinum	20,000^{*}
Spain (Promusicae)	Platinum	80,000^{^}
Sweden (GLF)	2× Platinum	80,000^{^}
Switzerland (IFPI Switzerland)	4× Platinum	120,000^{^}
United Kingdom (BPI)	Platinum	500,993
United States (RIAA)	2× Platinum	2,000,000^{^}
Summaries
Europe (IFPI)	2× Platinum	2,000,000^{*}
Worldwide	—	6,000,000
^{*} Sales figures based on certification alone.^{^} Shipments figures based on certification alone.^{‡} Sales+streaming figures based on certification alone.

== Release history ==
Release dates and formats for Black Ice
Country	Date	Format	Label	Ref.
Europe	17 October 2008	CD; double LP	Columbia	
Australia	18 October 2008	CD	Albert	
United Kingdom	20 October 2008	CD; double LP	Columbia	
United States	20 October 2008	CD; double LP	Columbia	—N/a
Japan	22 October 2008	CD	Sony Japan	
United Kingdom	1 December 2008	CD (limited edition steel-box)	Columbia	
Germany	5 December 2008	CD (limited edition steel-box)	Columbia	
Various	19 November 2012	Digital download (iTunes exclusive)	Columbia	
