= Live at River Plate =

AC/DC: Live at River Plate
- DVD cover
- Directed by: David Mallet
- Based on: Black Ice World Tour
- Produced by: Rocky Oldham; Dione Orrom
- Starring: Brian Johnson; Angus Young; Malcolm Young; Cliff Williams; Phil Rudd
- Edited by: David Mallet; Nick Morris; Juliet Santini
- Music by: AC/DC
- Production company: Serpent Productions
- Distributed by: Columbia Music Video
- Release date: 10 May 2011
- Running time: 111 minutes
- Country: Australia
- Language: English

Live at River Plate is a live concert film documenting AC/DC’s Black Ice World Tour. The DVD includes footage from three concerts performed in December 2009 at the Estadio Antonio Vespucio Liberti in Buenos Aires, Argentina, which is the home stadium of Argentine football club River Plate. It was directed by David Mallet, with Rocky Oldham as producer. The recording of the concerts required the use of 32 HD cameras; a company called Serpent Productions was responsible for filming and then producing the footage of the concerts. It was also the band’s last live album to feature rhythm guitarist Malcolm Young, before his retirement from touring due to dementia five years later and his death in 2017.

== Release ==
On 13 April, the Teatro de Colegiales in Buenos Aires had an advance showing of the film for an estimated thousand people. The official world premiere of the film was on 6 May at the Hammersmith Apollo theater in London.

Live at River Plate was released on DVD and Blu-Ray on 10 May 2011. In addition to the live footage, interviews with band members, road crew personnel and fans are included. The film debuted at the number one spot for music DVDs in seventeen countries, selling 19,000 copies in the United States during its first week on sale. In Brazil it achieved platinum status in just two weeks, selling 40,000 copies. The double CD version was released in November 2012. On 7 December 2012 an edited hour-long version was shown on BBC Four.

== Film setlist ==
1. "Rock 'n' Roll Train"
2. "Hell Ain't a Bad Place to Be"
3. "Back in Black"
4. "Big Jack"
5. "Dirty Deeds Done Dirt Cheap"
6. "Shot Down in Flames"
7. "Thunderstruck"
8. "Black Ice"
9. "The Jack"
10. "Hells Bells"
11. "Shoot to Thrill"
12. "War Machine"
13. "Dog Eat Dog"
14. "You Shook Me All Night Long"
15. "T.N.T."
16. "Whole Lotta Rosie"
17. "Let There Be Rock"
18. "Highway to Hell"
19. "For Those About to Rock (We Salute You)"

== Charts ==
=== Year-end charts ===
Chart (2011)	Position
Australian Music DVDs Chart	2
Belgian (Flanders) Music DVDs Chart	10
Belgian (Wallonia) Music DVDs Chart	5
Dutch Music DVDs Chart	19
German Albums Chart	37
Irish Music DVDs Chart	6

== Certifications ==
Region	Certification	Certified units/sales
Australia (ARIA)	5× Platinum	75,000^{^}
Austria (IFPI Austria)	Gold	5,000^{*}
Finland (Musiikkituottajat)	Gold	6,265
France (SNEP)	Diamond	60,000^{*}
Germany (BVMI)	3× Platinum	150,000^{^}
Germany (BVMI) album	2× Platinum	400,000^{‡}
Ireland (IRMA)	Gold	2,000^{^}
New Zealand (RMNZ)	Gold	2,500^{^}
Poland (ZPAV)	Gold	5,000^{*}
Spain (Promusicae)	Gold	10,000^{^}
United Kingdom (BPI)	Platinum	300,000^{^}
^{*} Sales figures based on certification alone.^{^} Shipments figures based on certification alone.^{‡} Sales+streaming figures based on certification alone.

== Album ==
On 13 September 2012, AC/DC announced a live album called Live at River Plate, containing all of the songs from the DVD and set and was released on 19 November 2012 in both 3 red vinyl set and 2-CD set formats.
