= Iron Man 2 (soundtrack) =

2010 film score and compilation soundtrack album

Iron Man 2 is a soundtrack album for the 2010 film of the same name consisting of music by Australian hard rock band AC/DC. It was released on April 19, 2010.

Iron Man 2: Original Motion Picture Score, a film score album featuring music composed and conducted by John Debney, was released on July 20, 2010.

== Iron Man 2 ==
Iron Man 2

Soundtrack album by AC/DC
- Released: April 19, 2010
- Genres: Hard rock; heavy metal
- Length: 70:15
- Label: Columbia
- Producers: Robert John "Mutt" Lange; George Young; Harry Vanda; Malcolm Young; Angus Young; Bruce Fairbairn; Brendan O'Brien

AC/DC chronology
Backtracks (2009)	Iron Man 2 (2010)	Live at River Plate (2012)

=== Background and release ===
The album of AC/DC songs was announced on January 26, 2010, and released on April 19 in the United Kingdom, the next day in the United States, and on April 23 in Australia. It consists of fifteen tracks originally released on ten different albums (Note: Eight albums, plus two different editions of Powerage (the version of "Rock 'n' Roll Damnation" on Iron Man 2 is the full-length version originally released on the Australian and U.S. editions of Powerage, which did not include "Cold Hearted Man", which was originally released on the European edition of Powerage, which included the abbreviated single version of "Rock 'n' Roll Damnation").) between 1975 and 2008, with the music drawn almost equally from the Bon Scott and Brian Johnson eras of AC/DC. Some of the material was remixed by Mike Fraser for possible inclusion in the film, but, of the songs included on the album, only "Shoot to Thrill" and "Highway to Hell" were ultimately featured in the film, while "Thunderstruck", "War Machine", and "The Razors Edge" were used in trailers and commercials; "Back in Black" had been featured in Iron Man (2008).

Like the soundtrack album for Stephen King's 1986 film Maximum Overdrive, which is titled Who Made Who and also exclusively features music by AC/DC, Iron Man 2 has been seen as, not a greatest hits collection, but a compilation album that contains both hits and lesser known tracks. Unlike Who Made Who, however, there are no new songs on Iron Man 2. Of the use of the band's music in the film, Steve Barnett, co-chairman of Columbia Records, said: "Jon Favreau's vision and passion for AC/DC's music blend seamlessly into this incredible film. The music really underscores the high energy and excitement of the film."

=== Music videos ===
A new music video for "Shoot to Thrill" was released on January 26, 2010. It features exclusive footage from the film Iron Man 2, as well as live concert footage of AC/DC performing the song in River Plate Stadium in Buenos Aires in late 2009. The concert footage was later featured in the concert film Live at River Plate (2011).

Upon the album's release, a music video for "Highway to Hell" was released. It features footage from the film Iron Man 2 alongside footage and live audio of AC/DC performing the song in River Plate Stadium in late 2009.

=== Reception and chart performance ===
Professional ratings
Review scores
Source	Rating
AllMusic	2.5/5 stars
BBC	(favorable)
Kerrang!	3.5/5 stars

Stephen Thomas Erlewine of the online music database AllMusic gave the album a mixed review, writing that "this is good guts-and-guitar music, its only flaw being that it plays it totally safe...unless you stop to consider that it might be a bit of a risk to pitch a collection of 30-year-old music to the teenage audience of Iron Man 2." The BBC gave the album a positive review, stating: "Younger listeners might find it all a bit clichéd, but remember: AC/DC are the originators, their imitators responsible for diluting the package's potency. For those about to rock, raise another salute to your enduringly enthralling forefathers."

The album debuted at No. 1 on the UK Albums Chart upon its release, giving AC/DC their third No. 1 album in the U.K. after Back in Black (1980) and Black Ice (2008). In the U.S., it sold 76,000 copies in its first week of release and debuted at No. 4 on the Billboard 200, becoming the band's eighth top-10 release on the chart. It reached the top of the Billboard Mainstream Rock Albums chart and stayed there for five consecutive weeks.

=== Track listing ===
No.	Title	Writer(s)	Producer(s)	Length
1.	"Shoot to Thrill"	Angus Young; Malcolm Young; Brian Johnson	Robert John "Mutt" Lange	5:17
2.	"Rock 'n' Roll Damnation"	A. Young; M. Young; Bon Scott	Harry Vanda; George Young	3:37
3.	"Guns for Hire"	A. Young; M. Young; Johnson	AC/DC	3:26
4.	"Cold Hearted Man"	A. Young; M. Young; Scott	Vanda; G. Young	3:34
5.	"Back in Black"	A. Young; M. Young; Johnson	Lange	4:16
6.	"Thunderstruck"	A. Young; M. Young	Bruce Fairbairn	4:53
7.	"If You Want Blood (You've Got It)"	A. Young; M. Young; Scott	Lange	4:37
8.	"Evil Walks"	A. Young; M. Young; Johnson	Lange	4:23
9.	"T.N.T."	A. Young; M. Young; Scott	Vanda; G. Young	3:34
10.	"Hell Ain't a Bad Place to Be"	A. Young; M. Young; Scott	Vanda; G. Young	4:15
11.	"Have a Drink on Me"	A. Young; M. Young; Johnson	Lange	3:57
12.	"The Razors Edge"	A. Young; M. Young	Fairbairn	4:23
13.	"Let There Be Rock"	A. Young; M. Young; Scott	Vanda; G. Young	6:07
14.	"War Machine"	A. Young; M. Young	Brendan O'Brien	3:10
15.	"Highway to Hell"	A. Young; M. Young; Scott	Lange	3:28

Deluxe Edition bonus DVD
No.	Title	Writer(s)	Length
1.	"Shoot to Thrill" (Iron Man 2 video, 2010)	A. Young; M. Young; Johnson
2.	"The Making of "Shoot to Thrill" Music Video"
3.	"Highway to Hell" (live at River Plate Stadium, Buenos Aires, Argentina, December 2009)	A. Young; M. Young; Scott
4.	"Rock 'n' Roll Damnation" (live at The Apollo, Glasgow, April 1978)	A. Young; M. Young; Scott
5.	"If You Want Blood (You've Got It)" (promo clip, 1979)	A. Young; M. Young; Scott
6.	"Back in Black" (live at Plaza de Toros de Las Ventas, Madrid, July 1996)	A. Young; M. Young; Scott
7.	"Guns for Hire" (live at Joe Louis Arena, Detroit, Michigan, November 1983)	A. Young; M. Young; Johnson
8.	"Thunderstruck" (live at Donington Park, England, August 1991)	A. Young; M. Young
9.	"Let There Be Rock" (live at Plaza de Toros de Las Ventas, Madrid, July 1996)	A. Young; M. Young; Scott
10.	"Hell Ain't a Bad Place to Be" (live at Circus Krone, Munich, June 2003)	A. Young; M. Young; Scott

=== Personnel ===
- Angus Young – lead guitar
- Malcolm Young – rhythm guitar, backing vocals
- Brian Johnson – lead vocals (tracks 1, 3, 5, 6, 8, 11, 12, 14)
- Bon Scott – lead vocals (tracks 2, 4, 7, 9, 10, 13, 15)
- Cliff Williams – bass guitar, backing vocals (tracks 1–3, 5–8, 11, 12, 14, 15)
- Mark Evans – bass guitar (tracks 4, 9, 10, 13)
- Phil Rudd – drums (tracks 1–5, 7–11, 13–15)
- Chris Slade – drums (tracks 6, 12)

=== Charts ===
==== Weekly charts ====
Chart (2010)	Peak position
Australian Albums (ARIA)	2
Austrian Albums (Ö3 Austria)	1
Belgian Albums (Ultratop Flanders)	1
Belgian Albums (Ultratop Wallonia)	2
Canadian Albums (Billboard)	1
Danish Albums (Hitlisten)	3
Dutch Albums (Album Top 100)	5
Finnish Albums (Suomen virallinen lista)	5
German Albums (Offizielle Top 100)	1
Greek Albums (IPFI)	1
Hungarian Albums (MAHASZ)	2
Irish Albums (IRMA)	1
Italian Albums (FIMI)	3
Mexican Albums (AMPROFON)	7
New Zealand Albums (RMNZ)	1
Norwegian Albums (VG-lista)	1
Polish Albums (OLiS)	5
Portuguese Albums (AFP)	6
Russian Albums (2M)	4
Scottish Albums (Official Charts)	1
Spanish Albums (Promusicae)	2
Swedish Albums (Sverigetopplistan)	1
Swiss Albums (Schweizer Hitparade)	1
UK Albums (Official Charts)	1
US Billboard 200	4
US Top Rock Albums (Billboard)	1
US Soundtrack Albums (Billboard)	1

==== Year-end charts ====
Chart (2010)	Position
Australian Albums (ARIA)	44
Austrian Albums (Ö3 Austria)	12
Belgian Albums (Ultratop Flanders)	21
Belgian Albums (Ultratop Wallonia)	34
Canadian Albums (Billboard)	45
Danish Albums (Hitlisten)	16
German Albums (Offizielle Top 100)	38
New Zealand Albums (RMNZ)	24
Russian Albums (2M)	40
Spanish Albums (PROMUSICAE)	40
Swedish Albums (Sverigetopplistan)	16
Swiss Albums (Schweizer Hitparade)	20
UK Albums (OCC)	39
US Billboard 200	65
US Top Rock Albums (Billboard)	11
US Soundtrack Albums (Billboard)	8

Chart (2011)	Position
US Soundtrack Albums (Billboard)	22

Chart (2015)	Position
Belgian Albums (Ultratop Wallonia)	198

Chart (2016)	Position
Belgian Albums (Ultratop Wallonia)	185

=== Certifications ===
Region	Certification	Certified units/sales
Australia (ARIA)	Platinum	70,000^{^}
Austria (IFPI Austria)	Gold	10,000^{*}
Brazil (Pro-Música Brasil)	Gold	20,000^{‡}
Finland (Musiikkituottajat)	Platinum	24,433
France (SNEP)	Gold	50,000^{*}
Germany (BVMI)	3× Gold	300,000^{‡}
Greece (IFPI Greece)	Gold	3,000^{^}
Hungary (MAHASZ)	Platinum	6,000^{^}
Ireland (IRMA)	Platinum	15,000^{^}
Italy (FIMI)	Platinum	60,000^{*}
Mexico (AMPROFON)	Gold	30,000^{^}
New Zealand (RMNZ)	Gold	7,500^{^}
Poland (ZPAV)	Gold	10,000^{*}
Russia (NFPF)	Gold	5,000^{*}
Sweden (GLF)	Platinum	40,000^{‡}
Switzerland (IFPI Switzerland)	Platinum	30,000^{^}
United Kingdom (BPI)	2× Platinum	600,000^{‡}
United States (RIAA)	Gold	500,000^{^}
^{*} Sales figures based on certification alone.^{^} Shipments figures based on certification alone.^{‡} Sales+streaming figures based on certification alone.

== Iron Man 2: Original Motion Picture Score ==
Iron Man 2: Original Motion Picture Score

Film score by John Debney
- Released: July 20, 2010
- Genre: Film score
- Length: 72:01
- Label: Columbia / Marvel Music
- Producer: John Debney

John Debney chronology
Predators (2010)	Iron Man 2: Original Motion Picture Score (2010)	Machete (2010)

=== Background ===
All of the songs on the film score soundtrack were composed by John Debney, except for "Make Way for Tomorrow Today", which was used for the Stark Expo in the film. It was composed by Richard M. Sherman as an homage to "There's a Great Big Beautiful Tomorrow", a song he and his brother Robert wrote for a Disney attraction at the 1964 New York World's Fair.

=== Reception ===
Professional ratings
Review scores
Source	Rating
AllMusic	3.5/5 stars
Filmtracks	2/5 stars
Movie Music UK	3.5/5 stars

James Christopher Monger from Allmusic wrote that Debney "had to contend with a near constant barrage of classic AC/DC songs when putting together his score". He called "I Am Iron Man" "a rousing, heroic, old-fashioned blast of all American guts and glory that sounds ripped (in a good way) from an old A-Team episode", and continued that "Antagonist Ivan Vanko's theme is appropriately muscular and Russian sounding, while action cues are beefy and peppered with bursts of distorted guitar (presumably a nod to Angus Young's omnipresent riffage), resulting in a score that's more than worthy of its narcissistic, heavily armored protagonist."

=== Track listing ===
All music is composed by John Debney, except for "Make Way for Tomorrow" and its "Expo Version", composed by Richard M. Sherman.

No.	Title	Length
1.	"Ivan's Metamorphosis"	5:47
2.	"House Fight V1"	5:47
3.	"Making Pepper CEO"	1:08
4.	"Senate / Ivan Creates Drones"	3:37
5.	"Make Way for Tomorrow – Expo Version"	0:53
6.	"Rhodey Dons Suit"	0:56
7.	"Dying Hero"	1:51
8.	"Natalie Intro"	1:03
9.	"Monaco Drive"	0:41
10.	"Mayhem in Monaco"	7:25
11.	"Jailhouse Talk"	2:24
12.	"Ivan Escapes"	1:42
13.	"Gun Show"	2:10
14.	"Tony Discovers Dad's Secret"	4:09
15.	"Sledgehammer V2"	2:39
16.	"Nick Fury"	1:29
17.	"New Element / Particle Accelerator"	6:14
18.	"Sledgehammer"	1:07
19.	"New RT / To the Expo"	1:43
20.	"Black Widow Kicks Ass"	2:11
21.	"Iron Man Battles the Drones"	8:00
22.	"Ivan's Demise / The Kiss"	5:05
23.	"Thor"	0:39
24.	"I Am Iron Man"	1:30
25.	"Make Way for Tomorrow Today"	1:51

== Additional music ==
Music featured in the film, but not included in either soundtrack album:

- "Should I Stay or Should I Go" by The Clash – plays when Tony Stark starts up his workshop computers
- "The Magnificent Seven" by The Clash – plays while Tony and Happy are sparring
- "California Love" by 2Pac, Dr. Dre & Roger Troutman – plays briefly during Tony's birthday party
- "Another One Bites the Dust" by Queen – plays during the fight between Stark and Lt. Col. James Rhodes
- "It Takes Two" by Rob Base and DJ E-Z Rock – plays during the fight between Stark and Rhodes
- "Robot Rock" by Daft Punk – plays during the fight between Stark and Rhodes
- "Pick Up the Pieces" by Average White Band – plays while Justin Hammer makes his stage entrance
- "Groove Holmes" by The Beastie Boys – plays when Stark is sitting in the "Randy's Donuts" sign
- A medley of the following American patriotic songs can be heard during Justin Hammer's presentation: "The Caissons Go Rolling Along", "Anchors Aweigh", "The U.S. Air Force", and "In The Halls of Montezuma"
