= Shoot to Thrill =

Song by AC/DC

Song by AC/DC

from the album Back in Black
- Released: 25 July 1980
- Recorded: April – May 1980
- Studio: Compass Point (Nassau)
- Genre: Hard rock
- Length: 5:17
- Label: Albert; Atlantic
- Songwriters: Angus Young; Malcolm Young; Brian Johnson
- Producer: Robert John "Mutt" Lange

Back in Black track listing
- 10 tracks Side one: 1. "Hells Bells"; 2. "Shoot to Thrill"; 3. "What Do You Do for Money Honey"; 4. "Given the Dog a Bone"; 5. "Let Me Put My Love into You"; Side two: 6. "Back in Black"; 7. "You Shook Me All Night Long"; 8. "Have a Drink on Me"; 9. "Shake a Leg"; 10. "Rock and Roll Ain't Noise Pollution"

Music video
- "Shoot to Thrill" (Iron Man 2 version) on YouTube

"Shoot to Thrill" is a song by Australian hard rock band AC/DC. It is the second track on the 1980 album Back in Black. This song is also the second track of AC/DC Live and AC/DC Live: 2 CD Collector's Edition, and is included on the Iron Man 2 soundtrack.

== Music video ==
On 26 January 2010, a new music video for "Shoot to Thrill" was released with exclusive footage from the film Iron Man 2. The live concert footage used in the video was filmed in December 2009 at a concert in Buenos Aires, Argentina at the Estadio Monumental, from which the Live at River Plate DVD was filmed.

== Live recordings ==
"Shoot to Thrill (live)"

Single by AC/DC

from the album Live at River Plate
- B-side: "War Machine (live)"
- Released: 16 April 2011
- Recorded: December 2009
- Venue: River Plate Stadium, Buenos Aires
- Genre: Hard rock
- Length: 5:47
- Label: Columbia
- Songwriters: Angus Young; Malcolm Young; Brian Johnson
- Producer: AC/DC

AC/DC singles chronology
| "Money Made" (2009) | "Shoot to Thrill (live)" (2011) | "Play Ball" (2014) |

Several different live recordings of "Shoot to Thrill" have been released officially. One version, recorded from the Razors Edge World Tour, was released on the 1992 Live album. Another version, recorded from the 1991 Donington show, was released on the deluxe edition of the 2009 box set Backtracks. Another performance, recorded at River Plate Stadium in Buenos Aires in December 2009, was released as a limited edition 7-inch single (backed with a live performance of "War Machine" from the aforementioned show) for Record Store Day 2011, promoting the live DVD Live at River Plate, which was released in May 2011.

== Meaning ==
When explaining his lyrical inspiration for the song, lead singer and then-songwriter Brian Johnson recalled reading a British article about a neighbourhood pusher who made daily rounds (almost like a milkman) throughout the London suburbs, selling narcotics to bored, lonely and depressed housewives. These substance-affected homemakers would then peruse the local clubs and bars, seeking out torrid, extra-marital relationships.

Lead guitarist Angus Young has commented that the song's "break-down", which occurs soon after the main solo (a muted and repeating three chord sequence of A Major triad, G Major triad, and a D power chord leading up to a bombastic outro-solo), was inspired by the trio gun-battle climax from Sergio Leone's classic, Italian western The Good, the Bad and the Ugly. In this seminal scene, gun-fighters Clint Eastwood, Lee Van Cleef, and Eli Wallach stare one another down in the centre of a Civil-War cemetery for minutes-on-end to an eventual shoot-out. Young said this sequence in the song was designed to mirror the actual soundtrack selection "Il Triello" by composer Ennio Morricone. Both compositions feature a slow quiet build-up, increasing in tension to a thunderous, cataclysmic finale.

== Personnel ==
AC/DC

- Brian Johnson – vocals
- Angus Young – lead guitar
- Malcolm Young – rhythm guitar
- Cliff Williams – bass guitar
- Phil Rudd – drums

Production

- Robert John "Mutt" Lange – producer
- Tony Platt – engineer
- Benji Armbrister – engineer
- Jack Newber – engineer
- Brad Samuelsohn – mixing
- Bob Ludwig – mastering

== Charts ==
| Chart (1981) | Peak position |
|---|---|
| US Billboard Top Tracks | 60 |
| Chart (2012) | Peak position |
| US Billboard Hot Digital Songs | 75 |

== Certifications ==
| Region | Certification | Certified units/sales |
|---|---|---|
| Brazil (Pro-Música Brasil) | Gold | 30,000^{‡} |
| Canada (Music Canada) | 3× Platinum | 240,000^{‡} |
| Denmark (IFPI Danmark) | Gold | 45,000^{‡} |
| Italy (FIMI) | Gold | 35,000^{‡} |
| Mexico (AMPROFON) | 3× Platinum+Gold | 210,000^{‡} |
| New Zealand (RMNZ) | Platinum | 30,000^{‡} |
| Spain (Promusicae) | Gold | 30,000^{‡} |
| United Kingdom (BPI) | Gold | 400,000^{‡} |
| United States (RIAA) | 2× Platinum | 2,000,000^{‡} |
^{‡} Sales+streaming figures based on certification alone.

== Cover versions ==
The song has also been recorded by Halestorm on their EP Reanimate 2.0: The Covers.

== Uses in media ==
This song has been used in several film and television programs including:

- Two commercials for Call of Duty: Modern Warfare 3
  - Live-action commercial with Jonah Hill and Sam Worthington.
  - In-game footage commercial
- Promotion for the film XXX: State of the Union.
- TV promotion for the Will Ferrell movie Talladega Nights: The Ballad of Ricky Bobby.
- The song appeared in the film adaption of The Dukes of Hazzard
- In the intro of TV Argentine program, Caiga Quien Caiga
- It appears in the first Iron Man 2 trailer and during the opening scenes of the movie. It is later reprised in 2012's The Avengers as a signature theme for Iron Man, playing when he joins Captain America in the fight against Loki in Stuttgart, Germany. The latter film's soundtrack was originally set to contain a cover of the song performed by Canadian rock band Theory of a Deadman, but it was removed for unknown reasons.
- In the intro of the Brazilian version of the TV program, CQC, Custe o Que Custar
- The live version was one of the two AC/DC theme songs to World Wrestling Entertainment's 25th Anniversary of WrestleMania event. The other was "War Machine" from Black Ice.
