= Big Jack (song) =

2008 single by AC/DC

Single by AC/DC

from the album Black Ice
- Released: 19 December 2008
- Recorded: March – April 2008
- Studio: The Warehouse (Vancouver)
- Genre: Hard rock
- Length: 3:57
- Label: Columbia
- Songwriters: Angus Young; Malcolm Young
- Producer: Brendan O'Brien

AC/DC singles chronology
"Rock 'N Roll Train" (2008)	"Big Jack" (2008)	"Anything Goes" (2009)

Audio video
- "Big Jack" on YouTube

"Big Jack" is a song by Australian hard rock band AC/DC. It is the second single and the third track on the band's album, Black Ice. This song was number 53 on Rolling Stone's list of the 100 Best Songs of 2008. The song was also featured in an episode of CSI: Miami entitled "Divorce Party". It is rumored the song was inspired by a man Angus hung out with in Memphis while on the Stiff Upper Lip tour.

It is also one of the songs from the album "Black Ice" that was played on the Black Ice World Tour that commenced in October 2008 and ended in June 2010.

== Digital amplification methods ==
Malcolm Young has stated that he recorded his guitar part in the song (and the following track on the album, "Anything Goes") using Amplitube amp modeling software.

== Track listing ==
- Promo CD:
1. "Big Jack" – 3:57

== Personnel ==
- Brian Johnson – lead vocals
- Angus Young – lead guitar
- Malcolm Young – rhythm guitar, backing vocals
- Cliff Williams – bass guitar, backing vocals
- Phil Rudd – drums, percussion

== Chart performance ==
Chart (2009)	Peak position
Canadian Hot 100	83
US Mainstream Rock	10
