= Amajlija =

Serbian and Yugoslav rock band

- Origin: Novi Sad, Serbia
- Genres: Hard rock; pop rock
- Years active: 1979–present
- Labels: Diskoton, PGP-RTB, PGP-RTS, Komuna Belgrade
- Members: Bogoljub Banjac; Dejan Starčević; Zoran Marjanović; Petar Banjac; Danijel Banjac; Igor Sakač
- Past members: Boško Plaćkov; Predrag Čoka; Slobodan Većkalov; Tomislav Milei; Petar Krsić; Zoran Bojčevski; Vojislav Vilić; Zoran Gerić; Zoran Petrić; Zoran Aničić; Slobodan Većkalov; Julije Dondo; Zoran Marjanović; Miroslav; Ljubenković

Amajlija (Serbian Cyrillic: Амајлија; transl. Amulet) is a Serbian and Yugoslav rock band formed in Novi Sad in 1979. Led by vocalist and guitarist Bogoljub "Čombe" Banjac, Amajlija reached the peak of popularity in the late 1980s and early 1990s with their melodic hard rock sound.

== History ==
The band was formed in 1979 by Bogoljub "Čombe" Banjac (vocals), Boško "Čvaja" Plaćkov (bass guitar), Predrag "Čole" Čoka (drums)— all three being former members of the band 'Oćeš-Nećeš (Want It or Not)— Slobodan "Veća" Većkalov (guitar) and Tomislav "Čvaja" Milei (rhythm guitar). Initially, the band performed cover versions of songs by The Rolling Stones, Riblja Čorba and Azra, and slowly prepared their own material. The band had rehearsals at the Zlatibor construction firm barracs, where, in late 1979, they had their debut live appearance. The band earned their first fee playing at a party organized by the Novi Sad Union of the Deaf People.

During 1980 the band rehearsed intensely and performed occasionally, mostly at elementary school dances. In the same year, the band was joined by contortionist Petar "Pera Gumeni" Krsić, whose primary role in the band was of a showman. In 1981, on the invitation by Radio Novi Sad producer Jovan Adamov, the band recorded four demo songs. The following year, the band performed at the Subotica Youth Festival. The band had another lineup change, the new members becoming Zoran Bojčevski (bass guitar) and Vojislav "Voja Ušar" Vilić (solo guitar), and then went on a hiatus, as a part of the members had to serve their mandatory stint in the Yugoslav People's Army.

The band continued their activity in 1985, in the lineup featuring Banjac, Većkalov, Čoka and Vilić, this time with Banjac on vocals and rhythm guitar and Većkalov switching to bass guitar. At a studio in Bukovac the band recorded material consisting of ten songs, intending to release them, which did not happen due to the low quality of the recordings. In the same year, the band performed as an opening act on the Bajaga i Instruktori Yugoslav tour. Due to the positive reaction by the audience and Bajaga i Instruktori themselves, the band also performed on the Bajaga i Instruktori 1986 tour, during which, due to a quarrel, the band disbanded.

In June 1987, Banjac, as guitarist and vocalist, reformed Amajlija with bass guitarist Zoran "Gera" Gerić and drummer Zoran "Petrija" Petrić. The band performed on numerous youth work actions and as an opening act on the Vojvodina tours of the bands Film, Kerber and Griva. However, Banjac decided to disband the band and record the material for Amajlija's debut album alone, with the help of guitarist Zoran "Anka" Ančić, who also produced the album, and sound engineer Milan Ćirić, a former Čista Proza member. The album Samo ti (Only You) was released in 1989 through Diskoton and brought the minor hits "Požuri druže" ("Hurry Up, Comrade") and "Dobar drug" ("Good Friend"). In order to promote the album, Banjac formed the new Amajlija lineup, consisting of himself, Zoran Aničić (guitar), Slobodan Većkalov (bass guitar), Dejan Starčević (keyboard), Julije Dondo (drums) and the band's old collaborate Petar Krstić.

The band's following album, Zašto si tako blesava i luda (Why Are You so Weird and Crazy), also produced by Aničić, was released in 1990 through PGP-RTB. Since Aničić decided to devote himself completely to a career as a producer, Većkalov switched to playing guitar, and the new bassist became the former Arena member Zoran "Zobma" Marjanović. While previous Amajlija album was more hard rock-oriented, Zašto si tako blesava i luda presented the band with a more pop rock sound, with the songs "To je bio dan" ("That Was the Day"), "Čeznem da te zeznem" ("I Wanna Screw You Up"), and "Veruj u ljubav" ("Believe in Love") becoming the album's biggest hits. The songs were composed by Banjac, and the lyrics were written by Banjac and Predrag Srbljanin, Banjac's former high school teacher. After the album release, the new band members became Miroslav "Kića" Maletić (solo guitar), and former Love Hunters member Milan "Mićko" Ljubenković (drums).

Amajlija's third album, Vruće + hladno (Hot + Cold), was recorded in London in 1991 by Banjac, Većkalov and Aničić only. With the album the band returned to hard rock sound. British disc jockey Andy Kershaw appeared on the album as a guest, playing acoustic guitar. The album's biggest hits were the title track and the acoustic ballad "Ume biti gadno" ("It Can Get Nasty"), which the band had considered not to release at all. Due to the intense live performances after the album release, including the 1992 and 1993 Gitarijada festival in Zaječar, Vruće + hladno became the band's greatest commercial success.

The band's fourth studio album, Čista zabava, čist rock 'n' roll (Pure Entertainment, Pure Rock 'n' Roll) was released through PGP-RTB successor PGP-RTS. The album, was produced by Bajaga i Instruktori member Saša Lokner, who also played keyboards on the album recording. It featured electronic music elements, resulting in negative album critics. However, the tracks "Dala si mi" ("You Gave Me") and the cover of Đorđe Balašević song "Prva ljubav" ("First Love"), due to their frequent radio broadcasts, became hits and the band got the opportunity to perform at the Music Festival Budva. After the album release, on 13 May 1994, the band held a large open air concert at Novi Sad's Danube Park handball playground.

In 1995, the band recorded the album Nikad više kao pre (Never Again Like Before), produced by Nenad "Japanac" Stefanović, who also wrote the music arrangements. Nikad više kao pre was Amajlija's first album on which all the instruments were played by members of the band. The album was recorded in Novi Sad Dum Dum studio and released in 1996. After the album release, the band had numerous live appearances, mainly at the Novi Sad club Zeppelin, and the Ujvideki Sinhaz theatre. The band also performed at the 1995 and 1996 Novi Sad Koncert godine (Concert of the Year) festivals. In 1998, Većkalov left the band, being replaced by Miroslav Maletić, but, soon after, the band went on hiatus and started performing occasionally only, mostly in clubs. In 1999, the band performed at the Štrand festival with Banjac's son Petar on drums for the first time. He would continue to occasionally perform with the band in the following years, until 2006, when he would become a full-time member of the group.

The band continued their activity in the mid-2000s, with Bogoljub Banjac's cousin Danijel Banjac on second guitar and Petar Banjac on drums. On 5 July 2008, the band performed as an opening act for Status Quo at the Rock Bastion Festival in Novi Sad. They released their fifth studio album, Prosula si sake na kimono (You Spilled Sake on Your Kimono), in 2009 through Komuna record label. The album featured a cover of the song "Tulsa Time", entitled "Žene" ("Women"), the re-recorded version of the song "Dobar drug", and the bonus track "Kišne kapljice" ("Rain Drops"), recorded with the tamburitza orchestra Zorule. On 26 May 2009, Amajlija performed, alongside The Answer, as the opening act for AC/DC on the concert held at Partizan Stadium in Belgrade.

In 2013, both Čoka and Većkalov returned to the band. Simultaneously with Amajlija, Većkalov performed with the band Rakila, recording the 2015 album Pokreni se (Move Yourself) with the group. In 2017, Amajlija released the single "MamuTi" (the title being a word play, as in Serbian "Mamuti" means "Mammoths", and "Mamu ti" means "[Fuck] your mother") on their official YouTube channel. In 2019, the band released the single "Veruj" ("Believe Me").

Amajlija's forming member Slobodan "Veća" Većkalov died on 5 July 2020.

== Discography ==
=== Studio albums ===
- Samo ti (1989)
- Zašto si tako blesava i luda (1990)
- Vruće + hladno (1992)
- Čista zabava, čist rock 'n' roll (1993)
- Nikad više kao pre (1996)
- Prosula si sake na kimono (2009)
