= Rock 'n' Roll Train =

2008 single by AC/DC

Single by AC/DC

from the album Black Ice
- B-side: "War Machine"
- Released: 28 August 2008
- Recorded: March – April 2008
- Studio: The Warehouse (Vancouver)
- Genre: Hard rock
- Length: 4:21
- Label: Columbia
- Songwriters: Angus Young; Malcolm Young
- Producer: Brendan O'Brien

AC/DC singles chronology
"Satellite Blues" (2000)	"Rock 'n' Roll Train" (2008)	"Big Jack" (2008)

Music video
- "Rock 'N Roll Train" on YouTube

"Rock 'n' Roll Train" is a song by the Australian hard rock band AC/DC. It is the first track on the album Black Ice to receive radio airplay. The band released a 7-inch vinyl single that featured the song "Rock 'n' Roll Train" on Side A, and "War Machine" on Side B. The 7-inch single came in a sleeve with its own unique artwork. The 7-inch vinyl was also made available in the United States through some independent record shops.

As with the success of the Black Ice album, the single was released to huge success. It was used in many television advertisements, more often being used as ESPN sports bumpers. It hit No. 1 on the U.S. Billboard Hot Mainstream Rock Tracks, staying there for three weeks. The song was also the first by AC/DC to chart on Billboard Alternative Songs chart.

"Rock 'n Roll Train" has been a staple of the band's live concert performances since it was released in 2008 although it was removed from the setlist halfway during the Power Up Tour in 2025. Due to its popularity among fans, AC/DC has performed it over 250 times as of December 2024, making it one of the group's top thirty most-played pieces (above earlier released tracks with related titles such as "It's a Long Way to the Top (If You Wanna Rock 'n' Roll)" and "Rock 'n' Roll Damnation").

== Background ==
Originally composed with the title "Runaway Train", the song was first heard by fans on 15 August 2008, at the shooting of its music video in Black Island Studios in London.

The song is notable for the novel way it was leaked online when one Scottish fan at the video shoot memorized the riff and sung it on YouTube, with other YouTubers adding vocals and further guitar parts. Angus Young initially conceived the song, and his brother Malcolm Young created the backing vocal harmony of the chorus ("Running right off the track"). The song is also centered around guitar riffs and elemental drum beats.

On 27 August 2008, close to midnight, the single was uploaded to AC/DC's official website and AC/DC's MySpace. It made its worldwide radio debut on 28 August at 17:00 New Zealand time on The Rock radio station. Many Australian stations played the song straight after their 4:00 pm news services. The song later made its way onto classic rock radio stations Planet Rock, Absolute Radio Classic Rock, Radio Caroline, radio2XS and Rock Radio in the UK. The song made its North American debut on 28 August on CKQB-FM in Ottawa, Ontario, Canada. "Rock 'n' Roll Train" debuted at number one on the Canadian rock chart for the week ending 5 September.

On 30 August 2008, the first Saturday of the U.S. college football season, the song was played extensively on ESPN and ABC college football broadcasts as intro and bumper music, along with other AC/DC songs "Thunderstruck" and "For Those About to Rock (We Salute You)". It was also played on a promo for CBS's Criminal Minds. It peaked at number one on the U.S. Billboard Hot Mainstream Rock Tracks chart. In November 2008 the song became AC/DC's first song to enter the U.S. dance chart as a result of several white label remixes being played in clubs.

Throughout the month of November, the World Wrestling Entertainment website featured the music video for "Rock 'N' Roll Train", as well as the song "Spoilin' for a Fight", which was the theme to the Survivor Series 2008.

The song was used to open shows on the Black Ice tour. A cartoon was played on the giant video screen above the stage; at the end of this cartoon a life-sized train came crashing out onto the stage. It is at this point that the band came out on stage and proceeded to play the song.

The song "Rock 'N' Roll Train" was also used in an episode of Knight Rider titled "Knight to King's Pawn".

== Track listing ==
1. "Rock 'n' Roll Train" – 4:21
2. "War Machine" – 3:09

== Music video ==
On 15 August 2008, AC/DC filmed the music video to accompany the song in London, where 150 contest winners and their guests were present. The video premiered on 19 September on the band's official website.

On 23 October 2008, the band released the music video online in ASCII art in a Microsoft Excel spreadsheet format – the first music video to be produced in such format.

The video also featured clips of the short film London to Brighton in Four Minutes.

== Awards ==
In 2009, "Rock 'n' Roll Train" was nominated for a Grammy award for Best Rock Performance by a Duo or Group with Vocal. It also won an APRA Award for Most Played Australian Work Overseas. In 2018 "Rock 'n' Roll Train" was voted number 6 by Absolute Radio listeners in their "Song of our Decade" poll.

== Chart performance ==
Chart (2008)	Peak position
Canada (Canadian Hot 100)	45
Hungary (Editors' Choice Top 40)	35
Japan (Japan Hot 100)	44
U.S. Billboard Mainstream Rock Tracks	1
U.S. Billboard Modern Rock Tracks	25
U.S. Billboard Hot Dance Club Play	30

== Certifications ==
Region	Certification	Certified units/sales
Brazil (Pro-Música Brasil)	Platinum	60,000^{‡}
Canada (Music Canada)	Platinum	80,000^{‡}
New Zealand (RMNZ)	Gold	15,000^{‡}
^{‡} Sales+streaming figures based on certification alone.
