= Cosmo Wilson =

Lighting designer and rock band director

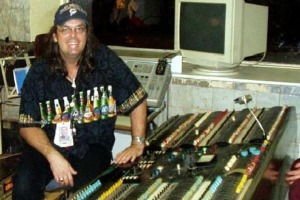
- Wilson in 2006
- Born: Charles B. Wilson; February 18, 1961 (age 65); Orlando, Florida, U.S.
- Known for: Stage lighting

Charles B. "Cosmo" Wilson (born February 18, 1961) is an American concert lighting designer and director for rock bands, active since 1986.

He has worked with over 40 acts including AC/DC, Aerosmith, Black Sabbath, Emerson, Lake & Palmer, Foreigner, INXS, Iron Maiden, Judas Priest, Meat Loaf, Mötley Crüe, The Rolling Stones, Ronnie James Dio, David Lee Roth, Scorpions, and Rod Stewart. He was a touring road crew member from 1986 and toured with The Cure, Genesis, Barbara Mandrell, INXS, Crowded House, and various other acts before becoming a director and designer.

He worked on the Rolling Stones "Steel Wheels" 1989 tour as lighting crew chief before moving up to lighting director in February 1990, where he spent the next 7 months touring Japan and Europe with both "Urban Jungle" and "Steel Wheels" shows. He has worked with AC/DC since 1990, directing over 700 shows since then, including 1991's "Monsters of Rock" stadium tour, which finished in Moscow on September 28, 1991 at Tushino airfield, where it was estimated that there were over 1.6 million fans in attendance, and was described as the first free outdoor Western rock concert in Soviet history.

Wilson also toured with AC/DC in 1990-1991 on their Razors Edge World Tour, in 1996 on their Ballbreaker World Tour, in 2000–2001 on their Stiff Upper Lip World Tour, and in 2008–2010 on their Black Ice World Tour, which lasted from October 2008 through June 2010, and played 168 shows in 29 countries with over 5 million fans in attendance, and at the time, was the second highest-grossing tour in history. He also toured with AC/DC in 2015–2016 on their Rock or Bust World Tour, and in 2024-2026 on their Power Up World Tour.

In April 1992, working alongside Designer Patrick Woodroffe, he directed and operated the lighting for The Freddie Mercury Tribute Concert for AIDS Awareness, which celebrated the life and legacy of Freddie Mercury and raised money for AIDS research. The tribute concert, which took place at Wembley Stadium for an audience of 72,000, featured a wide variety of guests including Robert Plant (of Led Zeppelin), Roger Daltrey (of The Who), Extreme, Elton John, Metallica, David Bowie, Annie Lennox, Tony Iommi (of Black Sabbath), Guns N' Roses, Elizabeth Taylor, George Michael, Def Leppard, Seal and Liza Minnelli. It was broadcast live to 76 countries and had an estimated viewing audience of 1 billion people.

In 2002, he traveled with the Scorpions, working together with the German lighting designer Lars Wulff, on the most extensive rock & roll tour of the old Soviet Union ever undertaken at the time. They played 20 cities over the course of 6 weeks on a tour stretching from Ekaterinburg in the West to Vladivostok in the East.

He also has credit for several live concert films, the Rolling Stones Steel Wheels At the Max (1991) IMAX movie, The Freddie Mercury Tribute Concert for AIDS Awareness (1992), Emerson, Lake & Palmer's Welcome Back (1992), Black Sabbath's The Last Supper (1999), five films for AC/DC - Live at Donington (1991), No Bull (1996), Stiff Upper Lip Live (2001), Live at the Circus Krone (2003), and Live at River Plate (2009), Dio's Holy Diver Live DVD (2006), Scorpions' Live At Wacken Open Air 2006 (2007), Foreigner's Alive & Rockin (2007), and Aerosmith's Aerosmith Rocks Donington (2015).

He has worked extensively with lighting designer Patrick Woodroffe since 1989 as co-designer, lighting director, and programmer on several of Woodroffe's shows, including AC/DC, Black Sabbath and the Rolling Stones. Prior to becoming a lighting designer, Cosmo worked as a backline technician for such bands as Joan Jett and the Blackhearts, Mink DeVille, D.L. Byron and Falcon Eddy, and musicians such as Ricky Byrd, Willy DeVille, Joan Jett, Thommy Price, Robert Sarzo and Johnny Thunders.

Cosmo is a two-time Parnelli Award recipient, winning Lighting Director of the Year 2015, and again, 10 years later in 2025, a Tour Link Top Dog Award for Lighting Director of the Year for AC/DC in 2016 and Aerosmith in 2017, and the "Live Production Summit Pinnacle Awards" for both Lighting Director of the Year and Lighting Designer of the Year in 2020, 2023, 2024 and 2025, and Lighting Designer of the Year in 2026.

In 2022, he was selected to be a Jury member for the LIT Design Awards.

He is currently working with AC/DC on their Power Up World Tour.

== Work ==
- AC/DC (1990–present)
- Aerosmith (2012–2023)
- American Idols LIVE! Tour 2003 (2003)
- American Idols LIVE! Tour 2004 (2004)
- Black Crowes (1991)
- Blondie (2022)
- Caitlyn Smith (2021)
- Black Sabbath (1998–1999)
- David Lee Roth (1994)
- Def Leppard (2013–2014, 2016)
- Emerson, Lake & Palmer (1992–1993)
- Foreigner (1995, 1997, 1999, 2000, 2006–2016)
- The Freddie Mercury Tribute Concert (1992)
- Gloria Estefan (1997)
- Godsmack (2003)
- Guns N' Roses (1987)
- Hollywood Vampires (2018, 2023)
- Iron Maiden (2005)
- Jason Bonham (1993, 1994, 2006–2008)
- Joe Perry (2018, 2023)
- John Secada (1997)
- Journey (2022)
- Judas Priest (2019, 2022-2024)
- Keith Emerson Band (2004)
- The Kill (1998)
- Mötley Crüe (1998–1999)
- M People (1997)
- Meat Loaf (2008)
- Mudvayne (2001)
- Rod Stewart (1993–1994)
- Roger McGuinn (1987)
- The Rolling Stones (1989–1990)
- Ronnie James Dio (1997, 2002, 2005)
- Scorpions (1997–2006)
- Slash featuring Myles Kennedy and the Conspirators (2022)
- Spinal Tap (1992)
- Steel Pulse (1988)
- Steven Tyler (2016–2025)
- Tamyra Gray (2004)
- Twisted Sister (2005)
- Tyler Bryant & the Shakedown (2016-2017)
- Van Halen (2013)
- Whitesnake (2003, 2018)
- 82nd Airborne Division All-American Band and Chorus Holiday Concerts (2020, 2021)
