= Ballbreaker (disambiguation) =

Ballbreaker is an album by AC/DC.

Ballbreaker or Ballbreakers may also refer to:

- "Ballbreaker" (song), by AC/DC
- Ballbreaker World Tour, a 1996 AC/DC concert tour
- Ball Breaker, in the manga story Steel Ball Run
- Ball Breakers, the 17th of season 3 of Beavis and Butthead
