= Stiff upper lip (disambiguation) =

Stiff upper lip is a colloquial expression referring to fortitude in the face of adversity.

Stiff upper lip may also refer to:

== Music ==
- "Stiff Upper Lip" (Gershwin song), a 1937 song by George and Ira Gershwin
- Stiff Upper Lip (album), a 2000 album by AC/DC
  - "Stiff Upper Lip" (AC/DC song), the title song from the album
  - Stiff Upper Lip World Tour, a 2000–2001 concert tour
  - Stiff Upper Lip Live, a 2000 DVD
- Stiff Upper Lip, a song by Mr Hudson from his 2009 album Straight No Chaser

== Film ==
- Stiff Upper Lips, a 1997 British comedy film

== See also ==
- Stiff Upper Lip, Jeeves, a 1963 novel by P. G. Wodehouse
