= Circus Krone Building =

- Kronebau
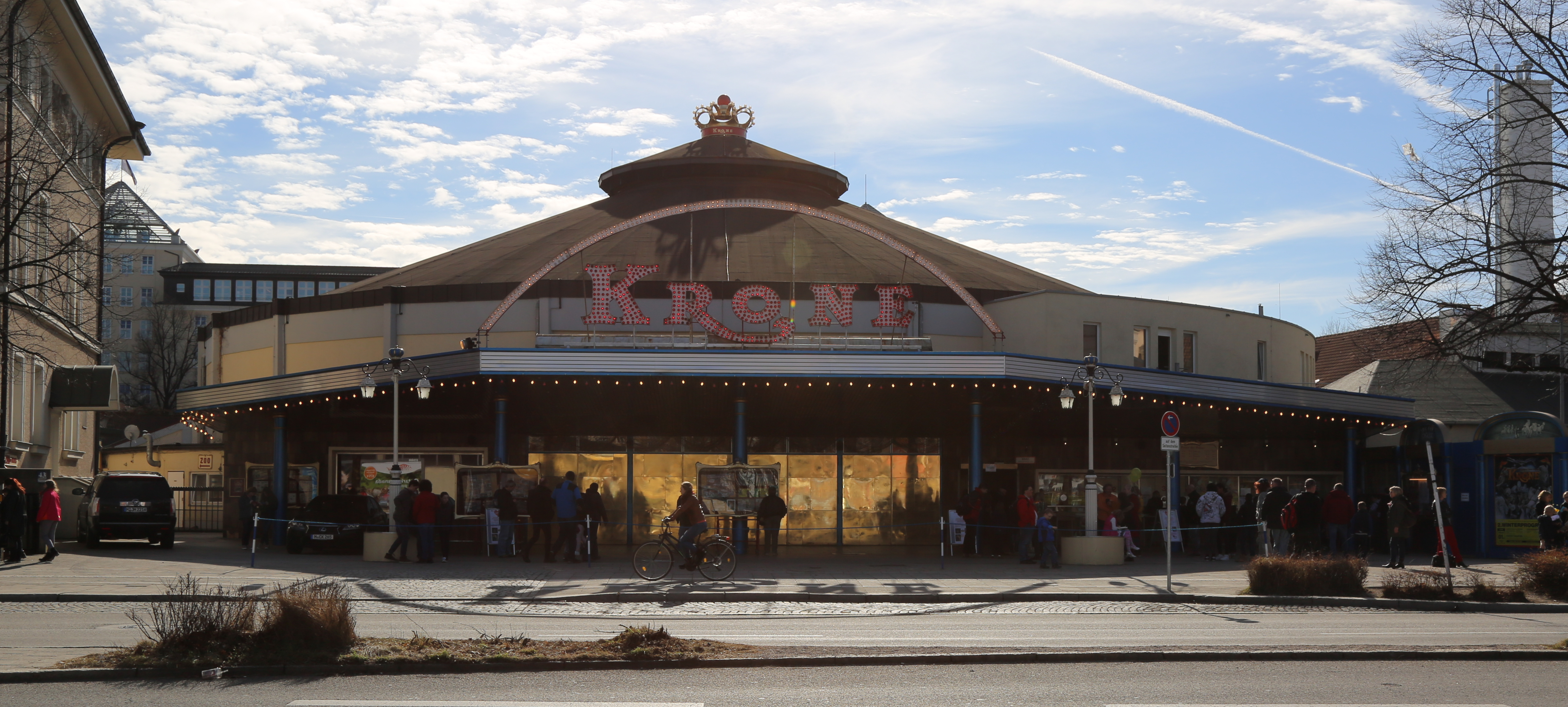
- Circus Krone Building viewed from the front
- Interactive map of the Circus Krone Building area

General information
- Type: Multi-purpose venue
- Location: Maxvorstadt, Munich, Germany, Marsstraße 43
- Coordinates: 48°08′43″N 11°33′01″E
- Opened: 1962
- Owner: Circus Krone

Other information
- Seating capacity: 3,000

Website
- https://bau.circus-krone.com/

Circus Krone Building refers to three circus buildings that have, and currently exist at the same location on the Marsstraße in the Maxvorstadt district of Munich, Germany. These buildings consist of the original Circus Krone Building, its temporary replacement, and the current permanent building.

The original Circus Krone Building was a 4,000-seat wooden circus arena completed in 1919. It was the headquarters and permanent circus building of Circus Krone. Beyond being used for circus performances, the Circus Krone Building was rented to various civic, political, and religious organisations to host meetings and speeches. It was rented numerous times to the Nazi Party, of which included Adolf Hitler delivering seven speeches in the building between 1920 and 1930. In December 1944, as a consequence of strategic bombing during World War II, the building was destroyed during a bombardment by the Allies of World War II.

After the conclusion of World War II in 1945, a temporary wooden structure with 1,800 seats was built such that Circus Krone could continue its circus show performances.

The third and current Circus Krone Building, opened in 1962, is a 3,000-seat multi-purpose venue built using reinforced concrete infrastructure and brick walls. It continues to serve as the headquarters and permanent circus building of Circus Krone, which is considered as "Europe's most famous traditional circus". Circus Krone occupies the building for its winter circus program every year traditionally from December until the beginning of April. For the remaining months of the year, the Circus Krone Building is rented out as a multi-purpose venue for entertainment and corporate events, including concerts, cabarets, musicals, comedy shows, television recordings, company presentations, and press conferences.

== History ==
=== Original building ===
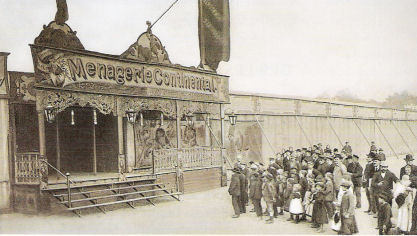
Menagerie Continental

The origins of the original Circus Krone Building date back to 1900, when Carl Krone inherited his father's travelling menagerie, 'Menagerie Continental', which performed year-round across Europe. By 1905, Krone and his wife, Ida Ahlers, had developed the menagerie into a circus show, establishing it as Circus Krone. Deciding to permanently locate their circus in Munich, Germany, the couple commissioned the Circus Krone Building to be built on the Marsstraße in the Maxvorstadt district of the city. The construction of the Circus Krone Building was completed in 1919, featuring a wooden circus arena with 4,000 seats. Besides being used by Circus Krone for their circus shows, the building also hosted numerous events organised by the Nazi Party. Adolf Hitler delivered 7 scheduled speeches in the Circus Krone Building between 1920 and 1930. During World War II, Circus Krone performances continued despite air raid alarms disrupting many of the shows. In December 1944, the original Circus Krone Building was destroyed during an air raid by the Allies of World War II.

=== Temporary building ===
Shortly after the conclusion of the war in 1945, a temporary wooden structure with 1,800 seats was constructed. This was at the request of the U.S. occupation forces of Allied-occupied Germany who wanted to present a circus show to their general from World War II, George S. Patton. This allowed Circus Krone to continue their circus show until the company and building were confiscated from the Krone family in 1946 by the American governors as part of their effort in dividing Germany so that it would not be able to regain its former strength. The Krone family was given back Circus Krone and the Circus Krone Building in 1948, and resumed its winter circus show program.

=== Current building ===
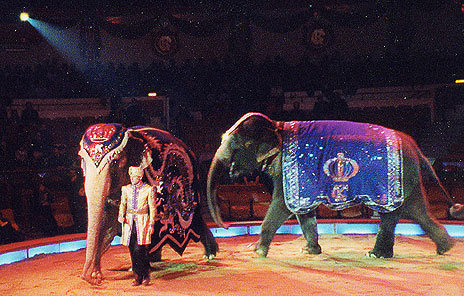
Elephants Mala and Delhi with their Swedish stablemaster Dan Koehl in maharaja clothing, in Circus Krone Building, Munich (Christmas 2001).

A new permanent building, the current Circus Krone Building, was opened in 1962 at the same location on Marsstraße in the Maxvorstadt district of Munich. It was commissioned by Frieda Sembach-Krone, the daughter of Carl Krone and Ida Ahlers, and her husband, Carl Sembach. Frieda Sembach-Krone inherited Circus Krone from her father after his death in 1943. The building, which has 3,000 seats, was built using reinforced concrete infrastructure and brick walls. It continues to be occupied by Circus Krone for their winter circus program every year. Circus Krone's current winter program begins on Christmas Day and concludes at the beginning of April the following year. It is divided into 3 distinctive themes that run for one month each.

For the remaining months of the year, Circus Krone operates as a travelling circus which performs in multiple cities across Europe. This makes the Circus Krone Building available to be rented out to third parties who host a variety of events, ranging from concerts to corporate functions. Since its opening in 1962, the third and current Circus Krone Building has hosted both local and visiting performers and events.

== Design ==
=== Original building ===
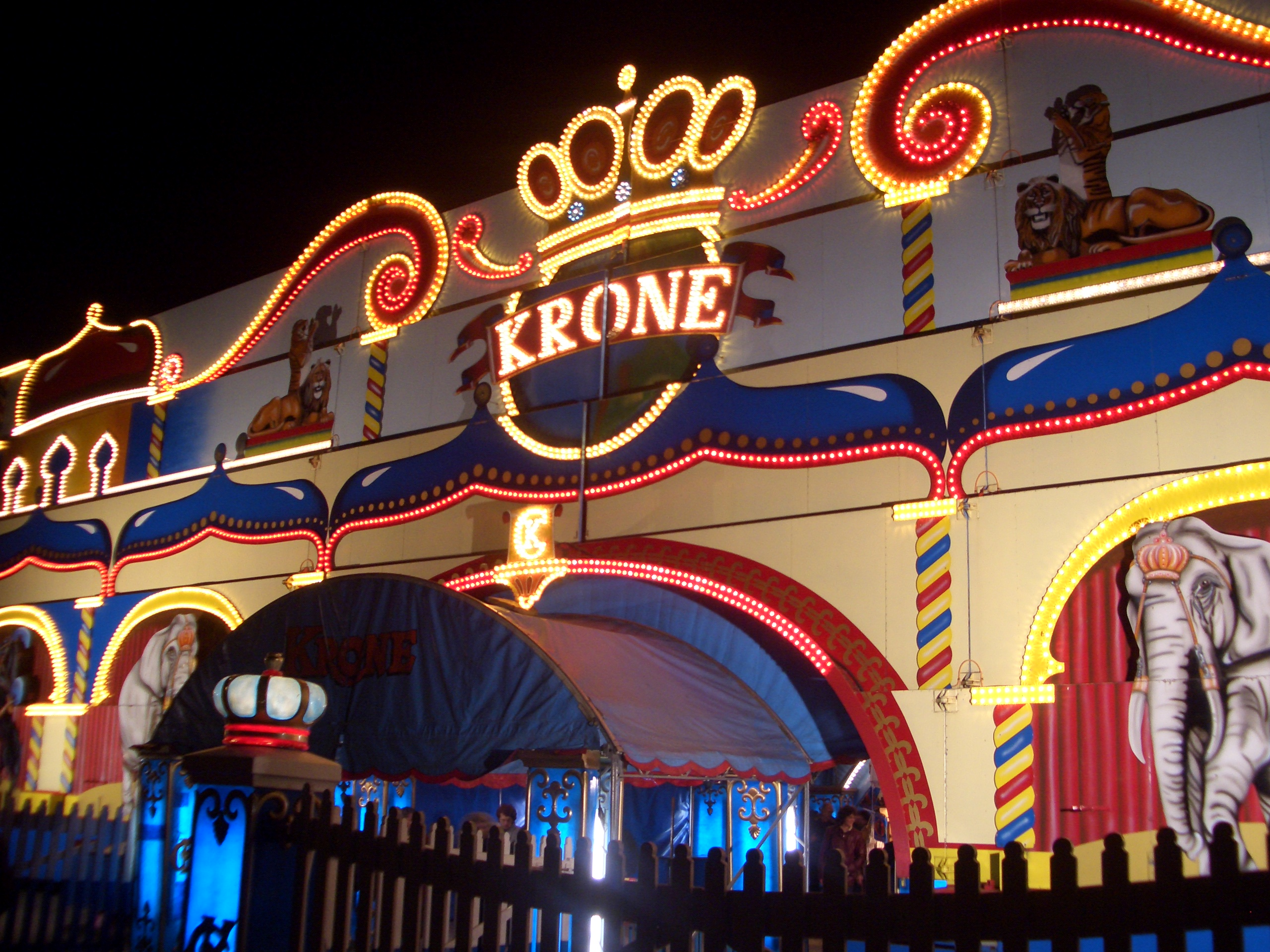
The current Circus Krone Building at night

The original Circus Krone Building was constructed entirely using wood, featuring a wooden circus arena with 4,000 seats. Beside the circus arena was a series of wooden annexes built to house the animals which were used in the circus shows.

=== Temporary building ===
The temporary Circus Krone Building that was built following the destruction of the original building featured a wooden structure with 1,800 seats.

=== Current building ===
The current Circus Krone Building consists of a permanent 3,000-seat performance arena as well as a series of annexes used to house Circus Krone's animals, rehearsal space, administrative offices, and dressing rooms. These annexes consist of 330 trailers, baggage and equipment vehicles, and stables. The Circus Krone Building venue also consists of infrastructure including workshops, kitchens, fire service, and waste disposal system. In terms of the performance arena, it was constructed using 4 steel masts, 4 steel lattice auxiliary masts, 12 square poles, 120 Rondel poles, and 250 iron anchors, with a permanently darkened roof.

== Performers and events ==
=== Original building ===
The original Circus Krone Building, from its opening in 1919 until its destruction in 1944, was used by its owner, Circus Krone, every year to perform their circus show during the winter months. When the winter program concluded, Circus Krone would convert into a travelling circus, touring multiple cities around Europe to present their summer program for the remaining months of the year. During the circus' absence, the Circus Krone Building was rented for various events, providing an avenue of income for Circus Krone to offset the costly nature of its international tours.

After World War I formally concluded with the signing of the Treaty of Versailles, Germany was required to accept sole responsibility for the damage caused in the war and pay reparations to the Allies of World War I. The burden of the reparations required resulted in economic and social disorder throughout the post-World War I years. During that time, the Circus Krone Building hosted meetings and speeches for civic, political, and religious organisations. Among these included the Nazi Party, in which leading figures of the party delivered speeches in the building. Adolf Hitler delivered 7 scheduled speeches in the Circus Krone Building between 1920 and 1930. In 1933, the Nazi Party organised a mass rally at the Circus Krone Building which senior members of the party spoke at, including Hans Frank, Hanns Kerrl, Roland Freisler, and Julius Streicher. Lawyers in Munich were invited to view the rally. On Nov. 8, 1944, the building was the site of the last official commemoration of the 1923 Beer Hall Putsch, most of Munich's beer halls having been wrecked by Allied bombing.

=== Temporary building ===
The temporary Circus Krone Building which was opened in 1945 allowed Circus Krone to resume its performances at the request of the U.S. occupation forces. The circus shows continued until 1946, when U.S. occupation forces confiscated Circus krone and the Circus Krone Building from the Krone family. Upon restoring the company and building back to the Krone family in 1948, the winter circus show program resumed in the Circus Krone Building.

On 18 April 1958, Hans Werner Richter delivered a speech in the Circus Krone Building on behalf of the Committee against Atomic Armaments.

The Big Show, a 1961 film starring Esther Williams and Cliff Robertson was filmed in the Circus Krone Building.

=== Current building ===
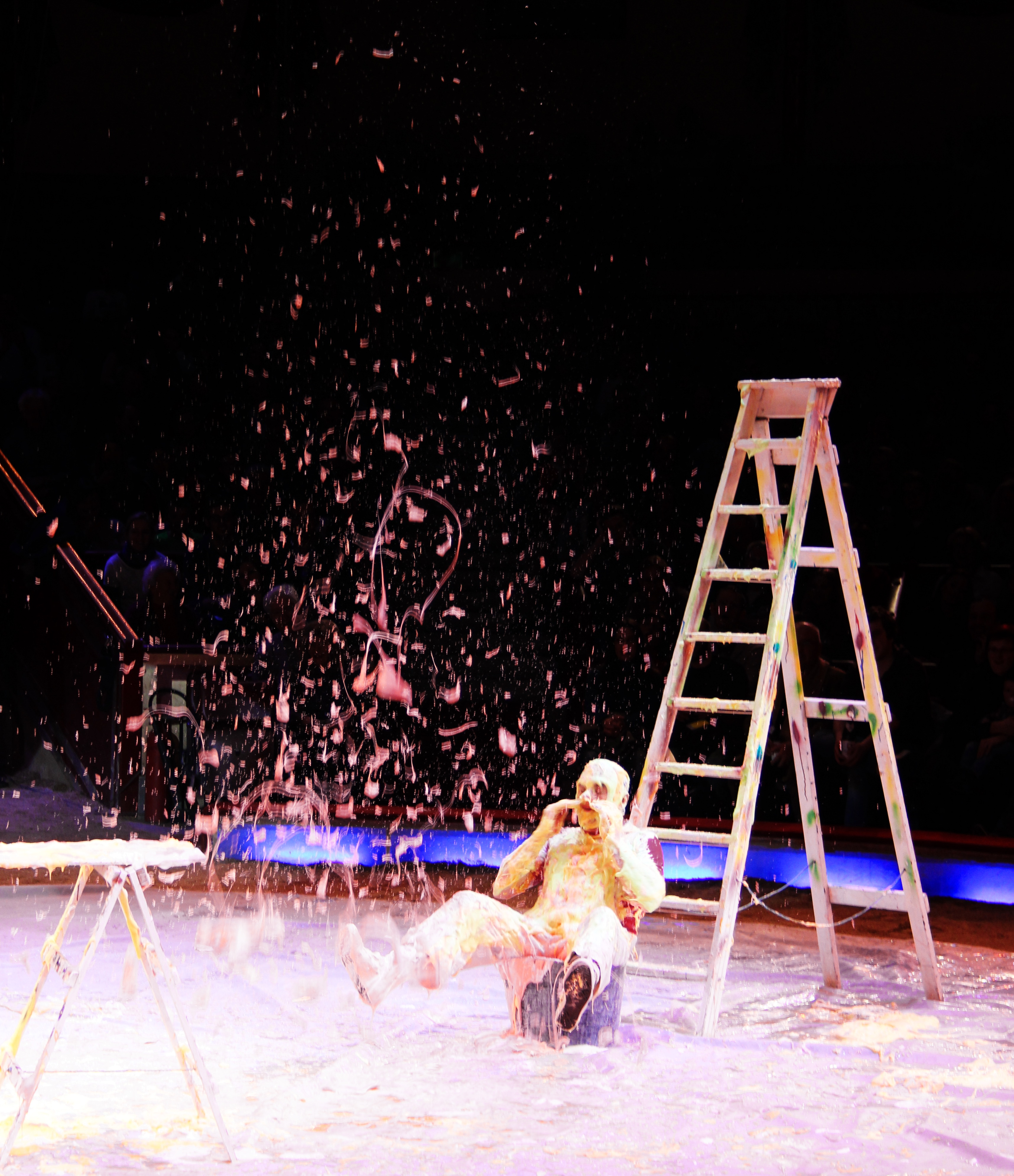
A Circus Krone performance

Unchanged from the original building, the current Circus Krone Building is occupied every year in the winter season by its owner, Circus Krone, to perform their winter circus program. The current iteration of the program features 3 parts, each with its own theme, that runs for one month each from Christmas Day until the beginning of April the following year. Also unchanged is Circus Krone's summer program where the circus tours Europe, performing in multiple cities. As such, the Circus Krone Building continues to be rented to third parties to host a variety events, including concerts, cabarets, musicals, comedy shows, television and film recordings, company presentations, and press conferences.

From 1959 until 2008, the Circus Krone Building hosted the annual televised German gala, Stars in der Manege. The television show was a charity fundraiser in which celebrities such as film stars and sports personalities were invited to perform circus acts with Circus Krone's animals.

In 1965, two episodes of The Ed Sullivan Show were filmed in the Circus Krone Building. Sullivan stated that one of the reasons for hosting his show in a circus was that "Circus show ratings far exceed most others. They are wonderful for my audience".

The Rolling Stones performed in the Circus Krone Building during two of their tours. On 14 September 1965, the Rolling Stones performed 2 shows in the Circus Krone Building as part of The Rolling Stones 4th European Tour 1965. More recently, on 8 June 2003, the Rolling Stones performed in the Circus Krone Building as part of their Licks Tour.

The Beatles performed two shows on 24 June 1966 in the Circus Krone Building as part of The Beatles' 1966 tour of Germany, Japan and the Philippines, with segments from the concerts filmed and broadcast. These concerts were the first stage of their 1966 world tour. The final leg of the world tour, The Beatles' 1966 US tour, was the last tour The Beatles performed.

AC/DC headlined in the Circus Krone Building during three of their tours. For their 1976 Rainbow European Tour, AC/DC performed in the Circus Krone Building on 29 September 1976. The band returned to the Circus Krone Building on 24 November 1979, for a concert as part of their 1979 Highway to Hell European Tour. More recently, AC/DC performed in the Circus Krone Building on 17 June 2003, as part of the Club Dates/Rolling Stones Tour.

Muhammad Ali appeared as a guest on Episode 3 of the third season of Am laufenden Band, which aired on 22 May 1976. This episode of the German television game show was filmed in the Circus Krone Building. On May 23, 1976, the weigh-in for Muhammad Ali vs. Richard Dunn, was conducted in the Circus Krone Building. Moments after Muhammad Ali stepped off the scales, the wooden stage of the Circus Krone Building collapsed, resulting in Ali and 25 other people falling through the hole which had opened in the floor. No serious injuries were reported, although three members of Ali's entourage were treated at a hospital.

On 16 November 2013, Jamie Cullum performed a concert to a sold-out audience in the Circus Krone Building. Following his concert, Cullum was condemned by animal rights groups for his decision to perform in the venue on the grounds that the building's owner, Circus Krone, continues to exhibit animals in their circus shows when they perform in the building in the winter season. Cullum responded via a spokesman, who said, "I can confirm that no animals featured in his performance and that he does not condone the use of live animals as a form of entertainment."
