= List of Lake Brantley High School alumni =

This list contains notable people associated with Lake Brantley High School in Altamonte Springs, Florida, including alumni and current and former faculty.

== Alumni ==
- Dee Brown (graduated 1996), professional football player
- Wendy Bruce, 1992 Olympic bronze medalist (team) for gymnastics
- Chris DiMarco (graduated 1986), professional golfer, 2005 Masters runner-up
- Patrick DiMarco (graduated 2007), professional football player
- Nick Franklin (graduated 2009), baseball player, currently plays for Los Angeles Angels
- John Gast, baseball player
- Tion Green, professional football player
- Matt Heafy, lead singer and rhythm guitarist of metal band Trivium
- Michael Johnson, musician
- Sinclaire Johnson (graduated 2016), track & field athlete who competes for Union Athletics Club
- Hunter Kemper (graduated 1994), Olympic triathlete
- Adam Kluger (student for one year, then transferred), CEO of The Kluger Agency
- Kam Lee, death metal vocalist
- Felipe López (graduated 1998), professional baseball player
- Kara Monaco (graduated 2001), Playboy Playmate of the Year 2006, contestant on Big Brother 14 on CBS (2012)
- John Mooney (graduated 2016), professional basketball player
- Mandy Moore, pop singer, actress
- Parc Jae-jung, South Korean singer, songwriter
- Rick Rozz, musician
- Drew Seeley (graduated 2000), actor, musician
- Josh Segarra, actor, musician
- Steven Sinofsky (graduated 1983), executive at Microsoft
- Travis Smith, former drummer of metal band Trivium
- Rob Thomas, lead singer of Matchbox Twenty
- Jason Varitek (graduated 1990), retired professional baseball player, 3-time All-Star, 2-time World Series champion
- Jonny Venters, professional baseball player
- Logan Warmoth, baseball player, Toronto Blue Jays
- Jemile Weeks (graduated 2005), professional baseball player
- Rickie Weeks (graduated 2000), baseball player, currently with Tampa Bay Rays
- Charlie "Cosmo" Wilson (attended 1976–77 and 1978–79), concert lighting designer
- Graham Zusi (graduated 2005), soccer player, currently plays for Sporting Kansas City
