= Club Dates/Rolling Stones Tour =

2003 concert tour by AC/DC and the Rolling Stones

- Tour by AC/DC
- Poster to the concert in Hockenheim, Germany
- Location: Europe; North America
- Start date: 11 March 2003
- End date: 21 October 2003
- No. of shows: 8
AC/DC concert chronology
| Stiff Upper Lip World Tour (2000–2001) | Club Dates/Rolling Stones Tour (2003) | Black Ice World Tour (2008–2010) |

The AC/DC Club Dates/Rolling Stones Tour was a series of concerts done by the Australian hard rock band AC/DC. The band was a support act for the Rolling Stones' Licks Tour in Germany, but also performed together in Toronto, Canada.

== Background ==
The band performed an exclusive show in New York City at the Roseland Ballroom on 11 March 2003 as part of a contest. Following the exclusive performance, AC/DC joined the Rolling Stones on the Licks Tour in Germany as an opening act. As part of the Molson Canadian Rocks for Toronto program for a benefit concert, AC/DC joined to support Rolling Stones on the lineup. The show in Toronto was the largest outdoor ticketed event in Canada, and its gross was in the 9 million range, drawing in 489,176 people. After the benefit concert, AC/DC performed in London, England on 21 October 2003 at the Hammersmith Apollo, which sold out in four minutes.

== Set list ==
=== AC/DC with the Rolling Stones ===
1. "Hell Ain't a Bad Place to Be"
2. "Back in Black"
3. "Dirty Deeds Done Dirt Cheap"
4. "Thunderstruck"
5. "If You Want Blood (You've Got It)"
6. "Hells Bells"
7. "Bad Boy Boogie"
8. "The Jack"
9. "T.N.T."
10. "Highway to Hell"
11. "Whole Lotta Rosie"
12. "You Shook Me All Night Long"
13. "Let There Be Rock"
14. "Rock 'N Roll Damnation" (omitted on 13 June 2003)
15. "For Those About to Rock (We Salute You)" (omitted on 30 July 2003)

=== Club dates (AC/DC Headline) ===
1. "Hell Ain't a Bad Place to Be"
2. "Back in Black"
3. "Stiff Upper Lip"
4. "Gone Shootin'" (omitted on 17 June 2003, "Shoot to Thrill" played instead)
5. "Thunderstruck"
6. "Rock 'n' Roll Damnation"
7. "What's Next to the Moon"
8. "Hard as a Rock"
9. "Bad Boy Boogie"
10. "The Jack"
11. "If You Want Blood (You've Got It)"
12. "Hells Bells"
13. "Dirty Deeds Done Dirt Cheap"
14. "Rock and Roll Ain't Noise Pollution"
15. "Shoot to Thrill"
16. "T.N.T."
17. "Highway to Hell"
18. "Whole Lotta Rosie"
19. "You Shook Me All Night Long" (omitted on 17 June 2003)
20. "Let There Be Rock" (omitted on 11 March 2003)
21. "For Those About to Rock (We Salute You)" (omitted on 11 March 2003)

== Tour dates ==
List of 2003 concerts, showing date, city, country, venue and headline of the tour
| Date | City | Country | Venue | Headline |
|---|---|---|---|---|
| 11 March 2003 | New York City | United States | Roseland Ballroom | AC/DC Headline |
| 9 June 2003 | Berlin | Germany | Columbiahalle | AC/DC Headline |
| 13 June 2003 | Oberhausen | Germany | O-Vision Zukunftspark | Rolling Stones Date |
| 17 June 2003 (Note: This concert has been filmed. This resulted in the video album Live at the Circus Krone.) | Munich | Germany | Circus Krone | AC/DC Headline |
| 20 June 2003 | Leipzig | Germany | Festwiese | Rolling Stones Date |
| 22 June 2003 | Hockenheim | Germany | Hockenheimring | Rolling Stones Date |
| 30 July 2003 (Note: This concert was part of the Molson Canadian Rocks for Toronto.) | Toronto | Canada | Downsview Park | Rolling Stones Date |
| 21 October 2003 | London | England | Carling Apollo | AC/DC Headline |

== Personnel ==
- Brian Johnson – lead vocals
- Angus Young – lead guitar
- Malcolm Young – rhythm guitar, backing vocals
- Cliff Williams – bass guitar, backing vocals
- Phil Rudd – drums
