= No Bull =

Video by AC/DC
- Released: 19 November 1996 (VHS); 16 October 2000 (DVD); 9 September 2008 (Blu-ray)
- Recorded: 10 July 1996
- Venues: Plaza de Toros de Las Ventas (Madrid, Spain)
- Genre: Hard rock
- Length: 123:39
- Labels: EastWest (original); Columbia Music Video (re-release)
- Director: David Mallet
- Producer: Rocky Oldham

No Bull is a live video released by AC/DC in November 1996, filmed on Super 16mm at Madrid's Plaza de Toros de Las Ventas on 10 July 1996 during the Ballbreaker World Tour. It was directed by David Mallet, produced by Rocky Oldham, mixed by Mike Fraser, and edited by David Gardener and Simon Hilton; production company was Serpent Films.

The show, involving a crane, a large model of "Rosie" and a finale with half a dozen blazing cannons, features 20 live tracks spanning their then 23-year career. It features four tracks from the Ballbreaker album, as well as other classic songs by the band.

On 8 September 2008 a director's cut edition entitled No Bull: The Director's Cut was released in the DVD and Blu-ray formats. This features the original concert as well as three new extra features.

== Track listing ==
1. "Back in Black"
2. "Shot Down in Flames"
3. "Thunderstruck"
4. "Girls Got Rhythm"
5. "Hard as a Rock"
6. "Shoot to Thrill"
7. "Boogie Man"
8. "Hail Caesar"
9. "Hells Bells"
10. "Dog Eat Dog"
11. "The Jack"
12. "Ballbreaker"
13. "Rock and Roll Ain't Noise Pollution"
14. "Dirty Deeds Done Dirt Cheap"
15. "You Shook Me All Night Long"
16. "Whole Lotta Rosie"
17. "T.N.T."
18. "Let There Be Rock"
19. "Highway to Hell"
20. "For Those About to Rock (We Salute You)"
- All songs written by Young, Johnson, and Young, except: "Thunderstruck", "Hard as a Rock", "Boogie Man", "Hail Caesar" and "Ballbreaker" by Young, Young; "Shot Down in Flames", "Girls Got Rhythm", "Dog Eat Dog", "The Jack", "Dirty Deeds Done Dirt Cheap", "Whole Lotta Rosie", "T.N.T.", "Let There Be Rock" and "Highway to Hell" by Young, Scott, and Young.

== Personnel ==
- Brian Johnson - lead vocals
- Angus Young - lead guitar, backing vocals on "Dirty Deeds Done Dirt Cheap" and "T.N.T."
- Malcolm Young - rhythm guitar, backing vocals
- Cliff Williams - bass guitar, backing vocals
- Phil Rudd - drums

== Special features ==
- Dolby Digital 5.0 Surround Sound
- Dolby Digital Stereo
- "Hard as a Rock" Promo
- "The Making of Hard as a Rock" documentary with interviews with Angus Young and Brian Johnson
- Lyrics, Subtitles and Close Captioning

=== Director's Cut ===
Stereo and 5.1 Surround Sound newly mixed and mastered for DVD

- Brand new hi-def transfer and re-edit for DVD
- Angus' cam versions in:
  - "Shoot to Thrill"
  - "Hail Caesar"
  - "Rock and Roll Ain't Noise Pollution"
  - "You Shook Me All Night Long"
- Bonus Tracks - Rare Performances from the Ballbreaker World Tour:
  - "Cover You in Oil" - from Gothenburg, Sweden
  - "Down Payment Blues" - from Daytona Beach, Florida
- Full catalog discography.

== Certifications ==
Region	Certification	Certified units/sales
Australia (ARIA)	6× Platinum	90,000^{^}
Austria (IFPI Austria)	Gold	5,000^{*}
Canada (Music Canada)	3× Platinum	30,000^{^}
France (SNEP)	2× Platinum	40,000^{*}
Germany (BVMI)	Gold	25,000^{^}
New Zealand (RMNZ)	Platinum	5,000^{^}
Spain (Promusicae)	Gold	10,000^{^}
United Kingdom (BPI)	Platinum	50,000^{*}
United States (RIAA)	5× Platinum	500,000^{^}
^{*} Sales figures based on certification alone.^{^} Shipments figures based on certification alone.

== Notes ==
- Audio versions of "Back in Black," "Hard as a Rock," "Ballbreaker," "Whole Lotta Rosie," and "Let There Be Rock" are available on the Australian Stiff Upper Lip Tour Edition, and also as b-sides of each "Stiff Upper Lip" single.
- Audio versions of "Hard as a Rock," "Dog Eat Dog", "Ballbreaker," "Whole Lotta Rosie," and "You Shook Me All Night Long" are available on the Deluxe Edition of Backtracks.
- The first releases of No Bull in the U.K. included a limited edition CD single with live versions of "Hard as a Rock," "Hail Caesar," and "Dog Eat Dog."
