= Foreigner: Alive & Rockin (video) =

Alive & Rockin'

Video by Foreigner
- Released: October 16, 2007
- Recorded: Balingen, Germany on 23 June 2006
- Genre: Rock
- Length: 100:00
- Label: E-M-S

Alive & Rockin is a live video of Foreigner that features nine of the group's 16 hits. It was recorded at the Bang Your Head!!! festival in Balingen, Germany, for the band's 30th anniversary in 2006.

== Track listing ==
1. "Intro"
2. "Double Vision"
3. "Head Games"
4. "Dirty White Boy"
5. "Cold As Ice"
6. "Starrider"
7. "Urgent"
8. "Feels Like the First Time"
9. "Juke Box Hero / Whole Lotta Love"
10. "Hot Blooded"

== Personnel ==
- Mick Jones - Guitars
- Kelly Hansen - Vocals
- Jason Bonham - Drums
- Jeff Jacobs - Keyboards
- Thom Gimbel - Guitars, Saxophone, Flute
- Jeff Pilson - Bass

== Bonus features ==
1. "Interviews with Jason Bonham, Mick Jones and Kelly Hansen"
2. "Foreigner TV - out and about with the fans when Foreigner play live"
