= Stiff Upper Lip World Tour =

2000–2001 concert tour by AC/DC

- Tour by AC/DC
- Poster to the concert in Gothenburg, Sweden
- Location: Asia; Europe; North America; Oceania
- Associated album: Stiff Upper Lip
- Start date: 1 August 2000
- End date: 8 July 2001
- Legs: 6
- No. of shows: 143

AC/DC concert chronology
- Ballbreaker World Tour (1996); Stiff Upper Lip World Tour (2000–2001); Club Dates/Rolling Stones Tour (2003)

The Stiff Upper Lip World Tour was a concert tour by the Australian hard rock band AC/DC in support of their fourteenth studio album, Stiff Upper Lip, which was released on 28 February 2000. This tour had 6 legs around the world lasting 11 months starting on 1 August 2000 in Grand Rapids, Michigan finishing on 8 July 2001 in Cologne, Germany.

== Background ==
The tour began on 1 August 2000 at the Van Andel Arena in Grand Rapids, United States. The stage show featured a 40-foot bronze Angus statue with horns which was featured on the cover of the band's fourteenth studio album, Stiff Upper Lip. During the show, the statue released smoke out of its mouth with fire coming out of the head of its guitar. The Munich, Germany show on 14 June was filmed for Stiff Upper Lip Live.

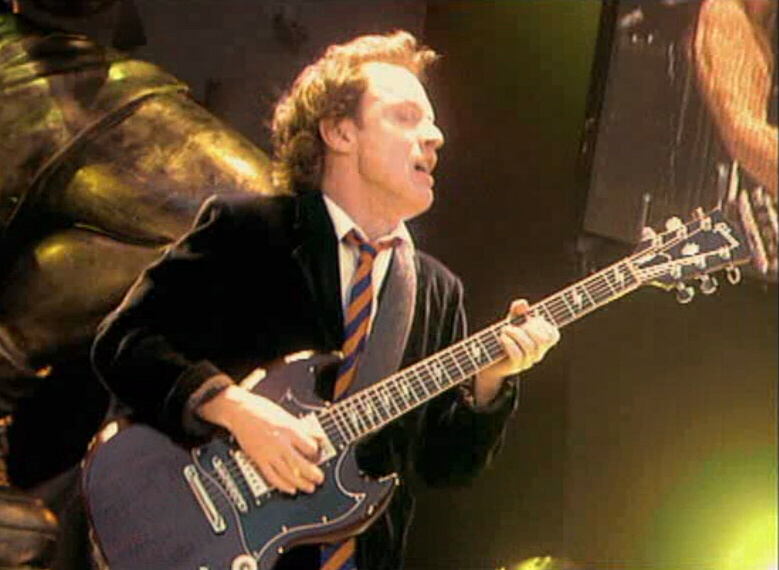
Angus Young performing at Olympiastadion in Munich, Germany

A fan was fatally injured at the 14 October show in Ghent, Belgium when he fell several metres onto a concrete floor. In Phoenix, Arizona, a "fan" chucked two bottles of beer at Angus Young and was brought out of the concert by security during the breakdown of "Bad Boy Boogie".

== Reception ==
Dale Martin, a reporter for the Victoria Advocate described the Alamodome show he attended as a triumphant return for the band, with fans welcoming them in full force - even as the audience got on their feet for the band's opening song, "You Shook Me All Night Long". He described the concert as "intense", detailing that Angus Young was his usual hyperactive self, as well as noting on the stage theatrics that were kept to a minimum, featuring a 30-foot high statue of Angus to remind the audience of his popularity. He noted that while the older fans were satisfied with the older material being performed, the younger audience were more familiar with the new material the band performed that night.

== Set list ==
The set list for the tour featured the band's classic songs, but did not feature as many songs off of the new album.

1. "Stiff Upper Lip"
2. "You Shook Me All Night Long"
3. "Problem Child" or "Shot Down in Flames"
4. "Thunderstruck"
5. "Hell Ain't a Bad Place to Be"
6. "Hard as a Rock"
7. "Shoot to Thrill"
8. "Rock and Roll Ain't Noise Pollution"
9. "Safe in New York City" or "Sin City" or "What Do You Do for Money Honey"
10. "Bad Boy Boogie"
11. "Hells Bells"
12. "Meltdown" or "Get It Hot" or "Satellite Blues" or "Up to My Neck in You"
13. "The Jack"
14. "Back in Black"
15. "Dirty Deeds Done Dirt Cheap"
16. "Highway to Hell"
17. "Whole Lotta Rosie"
18. "Let There Be Rock"

Encore

19. "T.N.T."
20. "For Those About to Rock (We Salute You)"
21. "Ride On"

== Tour dates ==
List of 2000 concerts, showing date, city, country, venue and opening act
Date	City	Country	Venue	Opening act
1 August 2000	Grand Rapids	United States	Van Andel Arena	Slash's Snakepit
3 August 2000	Auburn Hills	United States	The Palace of Auburn Hills	Slash's Snakepit
4 August 2000	Cleveland	United States	Gund Arena	Slash's Snakepit
6 August 2000	Pittsburgh	United States	Mellon Arena	Slash's Snakepit
8 August 2000	Boston	United States	FleetCenter	Slash's Snakepit
10 August 2000	Toronto	Canada	Air Canada Centre	Slash's Snakepit
11 August 2000	Toronto	Canada	Air Canada Centre	Slash's Snakepit
12 August 2000	Ottawa	Canada	Corel Centre	Slash's Snakepit
14 August 2000	Quebec City	Canada	Colisée Pepsi	Slash's Snakepit
15 August 2000	Montreal	Canada	Molson Centre	Slash's Snakepit
17 August 2000	Atlanta	United States	Philips Arena	Slash's Snakepit
19 August 2000	Bristow	United States	Nissan Pavilion	Slash's Snakepit
20 August 2000	Philadelphia	United States	First Union Center	Slash's Snakepit
22 August 2000	Wilkes-Barre	United States	First Union Civic Arena	Slash's Snakepit
24 August 2000	East Rutherford	United States	Continental Airlines Arena	Slash's Snakepit
25 August 2000	New York City	United States	Madison Square Garden	Slash's Snakepit
27 August 2000	Indianapolis	United States	Conseco Fieldhouse	Slash's Snakepit
29 August 2000	Cincinnati	United States	Firstar Center	Slash's Snakepit
30 August 2000	Milwaukee	United States	Bradley Center	Slash's Snakepit
31 August 2000	Tinley Park	United States	New World Music Theatre	Slash's Snakepit
2 September 2000	Minneapolis	United States	Target Center	Slash's Snakepit
3 September 2000	Kansas City	United States	Kemper Arena	Slash's Snakepit
5 September 2000	St. Louis	United States	Kiel Center	Slash's Snakepit
7 September 2000	Dallas	United States	Reunion Arena	Slash's Snakepit
8 September 2000	Houston	United States	Compaq Center	Slash's Snakepit
9 September 2000	Biloxi	United States	Mississippi Coast Coliseum	Slash's Snakepit
11 September 2000	San Antonio	United States	Alamodome	Slash's Snakepit
13 September 2000	Phoenix	United States	America West Arena	Slash's Snakepit
14 September 2000	Paradise	United States	Thomas & Mack Center	Slash's Snakepit
16 September 2000	San Bernardino	United States	Blockbuster Pavilion	Slash's Snakepit
17 September 2000	San Diego	United States	San Diego Sports Arena	Slash's Snakepit
19 September 2000	San Jose	United States	San Jose Arena	Slash's Snakepit
20 September 2000	Oakland	United States	The Arena in Oakland	Slash's Snakepit
22 September 2000	Sacramento	United States	ARCO Arena	Slash's Snakepit
14 October 2000	Ghent	Belgium	Flanders Expo	Slash's Snakepit
15 October 2000	Amnéville	France	Galaxie Amnéville	Slash's Snakepit
18 October 2000	Stuttgart	Germany	Schleyerhalle	Slash's Snakepit
19 October 2000	Stuttgart	Germany	Schleyerhalle	Slash's Snakepit
21 October 2000	Munich	Germany	Olympiahalle	Slash's Snakepit
22 October 2000	Munich	Germany	Olympiahalle	Slash's Snakepit
24 October 2000	Frankfurt	Germany	Festhalle Frankfurt	Slash's Snakepit
25 October 2000	Frankfurt	Germany	Festhalle Frankfurt	Slash's Snakepit
27 October 2000	Berlin	Germany	Velodrom	Slash's Snakepit
28 October 2000	Oberhausen	Germany	Oberhausen Arena	Slash's Snakepit
29 October 2000	Cologne	Germany	Kölnarena	Slash's Snakepit
31 October 2000	Paris	France	Palais Omnisport de Paris Bercy	Slash's Snakepit
1 November 2000	Paris	France	Palais Omnisport de Paris Bercy	Slash's Snakepit
3 November 2000	Oslo	Norway	Oslo Spektrum	Slash's Snakepit
4 November 2000	Gothenburg	Sweden	Scandinavium	Slash's Snakepit
5 November 2000	Stockholm	Sweden	Globen Arena	Slash's Snakepit
7 November 2000	Helsinki	Finland	Hartwall Areena	Slash's Snakepit
8 November 2000	Turku	Finland	Elysee Arena	Slash's Snakepit
11 November 2000	Leipzig	Germany	Messehallen	Slash's Snakepit
12 November 2000	Leipzig	Germany	Messehallen	Slash's Snakepit
13 November 2000	Utrecht	Netherlands	Prins Van Oranjehal	Slash's Snakepit
15 November 2000	Cologne	Germany	Kölnarena	Slash's Snakepit
16 November 2000	Hanover	Germany	Preussag Arena	Slash's Snakepit
18 November 2000	Zürich	Switzerland	Hallenstadion	Slash's Snakepit
19 November 2000	Zürich	Switzerland	Hallenstadion	Slash's Snakepit
21 November 2000	Vienna	Austria	Wiener Stadthalle	Slash's Snakepit
22 November 2000	Vienna	Austria	Wiener Stadthalle	Slash's Snakepit
24 November 2000	Dortmund	Germany	Westfalenhallen	Slash's Snakepit
25 November 2000	Riesa	Germany	WS Arena	Slash's Snakepit
28 November 2000	Birmingham	England	NEC Arena	Slash's Snakepit
30 November 2000	Sheffield	England	Sheffield Arena	Slash's Snakepit
1 December 2000	Manchester	England	Manchester Evening News Arena	Slash's Snakepit
2 December 2000	Glasgow	Scotland	S.E.C.C. Arena	Slash's Snakepit
4 December 2000	London	England	Wembley Arena	Slash's Snakepit
5 December 2000	London	England	Wembley Arena	Slash's Snakepit
10 December 2000	Madrid	Spain	Palacio de los Deportes	Slash's Snakepit
11 December 2000	Madrid	Spain	Palacio de los Deportes	Slash's Snakepit
12 December 2000	Madrid	Spain	Palacio de los Deportes	Slash's Snakepit
14 December 2000	Barcelona	Spain	Palau Sant Jordi	Slash's Snakepit

List of 2001 concerts, showing date, city, country, venue and opening act
Date	City	Country	Venue	Opening act
19 January 2001	Perth	Australia	Burswood Dome	The Living End
20 January 2001	Perth	Australia	Burswood Dome	The Living End
24 January 2001 (Note: Originally scheduled for 23 January 2001.)	Adelaide	Australia	Adelaide Entertainment Centre	The Living End
27 January 2001	Hobart	Australia	TCA Ground	The Living End
30 January 2001	Sydney	Australia	Sydney Entertainment Centre	The Living End
31 January 2001	Sydney	Australia	Sydney Entertainment Centre	The Living End
1 February 2001	Sydney	Australia	Sydney Entertainment Centre	The Living End
3 February 2001	Canberra	Australia	Exhibition Park	The Living End
5 February 2001	Boondall	Australia	Brisbane Entertainment Centre	The Living End
6 February 2001	Boondall	Australia	Brisbane Entertainment Centre	The Living End
8 February 2001	Sydney	Australia	Sydney Entertainment Centre	The Living End
9 February 2001	Sydney	Australia	Sydney Entertainment Centre	The Living End
11 February 2001	Melbourne	Australia	Rod Laver Arena	The Living End
12 February 2001	Melbourne	Australia	Rod Laver Arena	The Living End
14 February 2001	Melbourne	Australia	Rod Laver Arena	The Living End
15 February 2001	Sydney	Australia	Sydney Entertainment Centre	The Living End
19 February 2001	Yokohama	Japan	Yokohama Arena	—N/a
20 February 2001	Yokohama	Japan	Yokohama Arena	—N/a
23 February 2001	Osaka	Japan	Osaka Castle Hall	—N/a
18 March 2001	Sunrise	United States	National Car Rental Center	Wide Mouth Mason
20 March 2001	Orlando	United States	TD Waterhouse Centre	Wide Mouth Mason
21 March 2001	Tampa	United States	St. Pete Times Forum	Wide Mouth Mason
23 March 2001	Nashville	United States	Gaylord Entertainment Center	Wide Mouth Mason
24 March 2001	Memphis	United States	Pyramid Arena	Wide Mouth Mason
26 March 2001	North Little Rock	United States	Alltel Arena	Wide Mouth Mason
28 March 2001	Greenvile	United States	BI-LO Center	Wide Mouth Mason
29 March 2001	Greensboro	United States	Greensboro Coliseum	Wide Mouth Mason
31 March 2001	Charlotte	United States	Charlotte Coliseum	Wide Mouth Mason
1 April 2001	Raleigh	United States	Raleigh Entertainment & Sports Arena	Wide Mouth Mason
3 April 2001	Fairborn	United States	Ervin J. Nutter Center	Wide Mouth Mason
4 April 2001	Columbus	United States	Nationwide Arena	Wide Mouth Mason
6 April 2001	Cleveland	United States	Gund Arena	Wide Mouth Mason
8 April 2001	Chicago	United States	United Center	Wide Mouth Mason
9 April 2001	St. Paul	United States	Xcel Energy Center	Wide Mouth Mason
11 April 2001	Denver	United States	Pepsi Center	Wide Mouth Mason
12 April 2001	West Valley City	United States	E Center	Wide Mouth Mason
14 April 2001	Inglewood	United States	Great Western Forum	Wide Mouth Mason
16 April 2001	Long Beach	United States	Long Beach Arena	Wide Mouth Mason
17 April 2001	Sacramento	United States	ARCO Arena	Wide Mouth Mason
18 April 2001	Portland	United States	Rose Garden Arena	Wide Mouth Mason
20 April 2001	Tacoma	United States	Tacoma Dome	Wide Mouth Mason
22 April 2001	Vancouver	Canada	General Motors Place	Wide Mouth Mason
23 April 2001	Vancouver	Canada	General Motors Place	Wide Mouth Mason
25 April 2001	Edmonton	Canada	Skyreach Centre	Wide Mouth Mason
26 April 2001	Calgary	Canada	Pengrowth Saddledome	Wide Mouth Mason
28 April 2001	Winnipeg	Canada	Winnipeg Arena	Wide Mouth Mason
29 April 2001	Fargo	United States	Fargodome	Wide Mouth Mason
4 May 2001	Boston	United States	FleetCenter	Buckcherry
5 May 2001	Philadelphia	United States	First Union Spectrum	Buckcherry
8 May 2001	New York City	United States	Madison Square Garden	Buckcherry
9 May 2001 (Note: Originally scheduled for 7 May 2001.)	Albany	United States	Pepsi Arena	Buckcherry
11 May 2001 (Note: Originally scheduled for 1 May 2001.)	Madison	United States	Kohl Center	Wide Mouth Mason
12 May 2001 (Note: Originally scheduled for 2 May 2001.)	Detroit	United States	Joe Louis Arena	Wide Mouth Mason
8 June 2001	Milton Keynes	England	National Bowl	Megadeth; Queens of the Stone Age; The Offspring
10 June 2001	Hockenheim	Germany	Hockenheimring	Buddy Guy; Die Toten Hosen; Megadeth
12 June 2001	Prague	Czech Republic	Strahov Stadium	Rammstein
14 June 2001	Munich	Germany	Olympiastadion	Brings; Cane
16 June 2001	Klettwitz	Germany	Lausitzring	Die Toten Hosen; Megadeth
17 June 2001	Hanover	Germany	Niedersachsenstadion	Megadeth; Brings
20 June 2001	Zürich	Switzerland	Letzigrund	Megadeth; The Offspring
22 June 2001	Saint-Denis (Note: Billed as Paris.)	France	Stade de France	The Offspring; Pure Rubbish
24 June 2001	Gothenburg	Sweden	Ullevi	Megadeth; LOK; Hardcore Superstar
26 June 2001	Helsinki	Finland	Olympiastadion	George Thorogood & The Destroyers; Jim Suhler
29 June 2001	Nuremberg	Germany	Frankenstadion	The Black Crows; Die Toten Hosen
1 July 2001	Hamburg	Germany	Trabrennbahn Bahrenfeld	The Black Crows; George Thorogood & The Destroyers
4 July 2001	Turin	Italy	Stadio delle Alpi	Gotthard; Hardcore Superstar
6 July 2001	Basel	Switzerland	St. Jakob-Park	Krokus; Nikki Costa
8 July 2001	Cologne	Germany	Müngersdorfer Stadion	Die Toten Hosen; Cane

=== Box office score data ===
List of box office score data with date, city, venue, attendance, gross, references
Date	City	Venue	Attendance	Gross	Ref(s)
13 September 2000	Phoenix, United States	America West Arena	11,405 / 12,000	$512,087	
18 March 2001	Sunrise, United States	National Car Rental Center	13,349 / 14,157	$534,555	
21 March 2001	Tampa, United States	Ice Palace	13,144 / 15,087	$498,836	
23 March 2001	Nashville, United States	Gaylord Entertainment Center	14,312 / 14,312	$634,923	
24 March 2001	Memphis, United States	The Pyramid	12,237 / 14,000	$519,265	
26 March 2001	North Little Rock, United States	Alltel Arena	9,587 / 12,000	$402,855	
29 March 2001	Greensboro, United States	Coliseum	12,557 / 13,503	$490,555	
31 March 2001	Charlotte, United States	Coliseum	16,882 / 16,882	$661,855	
1 April 2001	Raleigh, United States	Entertainment and Sports Arena	9,598 / 13,805	$393,340	
4 April 2001	Columbus, United States	Nationwide Arena	14,239 / 14,239	$570,416	
6 April 2001	Cleveland, United States	Gund Arena	16,316 / 16,316	$687,975	
8 April 2001	Chicago, United States	United Center	14,178 / 14,178	$624,540	
9 April 2001	Saint Paul, United States	Xcel Energy Center	14,484 / 16,500	$615,420	
11 April 2001	Denver, United States	Pepsi Center	12,853 / 12,853	$563,425	
12 April 2001	West Valley City, United States	E Center	10,520 / 10,520	$466,650	
14 April 2001	Inglewood, United States	Great Western Forum	13,909 / 13,909	$554,105	
16 April 2001	Long Beach, United States	Arena	10,187 / 10,187	$487,654	
19 April 2001	Portland, United States	Rose Garden	13,722 / 13,722	$601,740	
20 April 2001	Tacoma, United States	Dome	19,504 / 19,504	$858,860	
29 April 2001	Fargo, United States	Fargodome	21,494 / 21,494	$887,598	
5 May 2001	Philadelphia, United States	First Union Spectrum	13,526 / 13,526	$556,620	
9 May 2001	Albany, United States	Pepsi Arena	10,397 / 11,682	$468,665	
11 May 2001	Madison, United States	Kohl Center Arena	11,262 / 11,577	$466,905	

== Personnel ==
- Brian Johnson – lead vocals
- Angus Young – lead guitar
- Malcolm Young – rhythm guitar, backing vocals
- Cliff Williams – bass, backing vocals
- Phil Rudd – drums
