= Ballbreaker World Tour =

1996 concert tour by AC/DC

- Tour by AC/DC
- Poster to the concert in Berlin, Germany
- Location: Europe; North America; Oceania; South America
- Associated album: Ballbreaker
- Start date: 12 January 1996
- End date: 30 November 1996
- Legs: 5
- No. of shows: 155

AC/DC concert chronology
- Razors Edge World Tour (1990–1991); Ballbreaker World Tour (1996); Stiff Upper Lip World Tour (2000–2001)

The Ballbreaker World Tour was a concert tour played by the Australian hard rock band AC/DC, in support of their thirteenth studio album Ballbreaker, which was released on 26 September 1995. This tour had 5 legs around the world lasting 11 months starting on 12 January 1996 in Greensboro, North Carolina finishing on 30 November 1996 in Christchurch, New Zealand.

== Background ==
This was Phil Rudd's first tour with the group since he rejoined in 1994. The band started the tour in North America, followed by a European leg and an Australian leg at the end of the tour. The band also performed in South America, playing to audiences of 65,000 in Brazil, Chile and Argentina.

A video was played at the beginning of each concert featuring Beavis and Butt-Head. Each concert began with a large wrecking ball dropping down from a 38-foot crane and 'destroying' part of the stage which was a cement wall behind the drum riser, forming a gap in the stage, from which the band would emerge to open the show with "Back in Black". The sound system for the tour carried more than 50,000 watts. Each show would conclude with "For Those About to Rock", which featured six working cannons.

The Wildhearts supported on the second European and third US legs. "It turned from majesty to comedy to tragedy all in one month," shuddered mainstay Ginger. "We got there [the US] and took full advantage of the welcome that America affords a young band, which is as much drugs and alcohol as we could get our hands on – and then, inevitably, we started fighting with each other… I love AC/DC. They turn up, do their job and go. You tour for years and years and you don't do that by hanging out and partying all the time… We managed five dates."

== Reception ==
Brian Gnatt from the Michigan Daily, gave the Detroit performance a positive review. He opened his review, stating that despite the band's ages, they had a lot of untapped energy as they did 22 years ago. Gnatt praised the sound, stating that the guitar licks were as fresh as the day they were recorded as well as Brian Johnson's vocals - stating that they sounded good as ever despite the weakness of his voice on the Ballbreaker album. Also praising the performance of the band, Gnatt stated that it outshone all of the antics on stage, while also stating that Angus Young looked to be having fun while performing to screaming fans.

Dale Martin from the Victoria Advocate had also given the band's performance a positive review. He opened his review, noting that the band thrives on simplicity and is a constant in the music world. The audience at the show as more subdued and expressed many approval, with the audience singing "You Shook Me All Night Long" until they lost their voices. Martin noted on the setlist changes in which the band performed all phases of their career. When Angus Young began his guitar solo, Martin said it lasted forever and that he was all over the place until he disappeared and reappeared on top of a burly security guard. He concluded his review, stating that fans at the end of the show were in awe and probably a little deaf, with sound reading decibels coming in at 129.

== Opening acts ==
- The Poor
- The Wildhearts
- Joe Satriani
- Sepultura

== Tour dates ==
List of 1996 concerts
Date (1996)	City	Country	Venue
12 January	Greensboro	United States	Greensboro Coliseum
13 January	Charlotte	United States	Charlotte Coliseum
15 January	Columbia	United States	Carolina Coliseum
17 January	Memphis	United States	Pyramid Arena
18 January	Birmingham	United States	BJCC Arena
20 January	St. Petersburg	United States	Thunderdome
21 January	Miami	United States	Miami Arena
22 January	Daytona Beach	United States	Ocean Center
23 January	Atlanta	United States	The Omni
25 January	Houston	United States	The Summit
26 January	Austin	United States	Frank Erwin Center
27 January	San Antonio	United States	Alamodome
3 February	Oakland	United States	Oakland–Alameda County Coliseum Arena
4 February (Note: Originally scheduled for 2 February.)	San Jose	United States	San Jose Arena
5 February	Sacramento	United States	ARCO Arena
7 February	Portland	United States	Rose Garden Arena
8 February	Vancouver	Canada	General Motors Place
9 February	Vancouver	Canada	General Motors Place
10 February	Tacoma	United States	Tacoma Dome
12 February	San Diego	United States	San Diego Sports Arena
13 February (Note: Originally scheduled for 30 January.)	Anaheim	United States	Arrowhead Pond
14 February (Note: Originally scheduled for 29 January.)	Phoenix	United States	America West Arena
16 February	Mexico City	Mexico	Palacio de los Deportes
17 February	Mexico City	Mexico	Palacio de los Deportes
21 February (Note: Originally scheduled for 1 February.)	Inglewood	United States	Great Western Forum
2 March	Minneapolis	United States	Target Center
3 March	Rockford	United States	Rockford MetroCentre
5 March	Milwaukee	United States	Bradley Center
7 March	Indianapolis	United States	Market Square Arena
8 March	Evansville	United States	Roberts Municipal Stadium
9 March	Chicago	United States	United Center
11 March	Louisville	United States	Freedom Hall
13 March	Landover	United States	USAir Arena
14 March	Philadelphia	United States	CoreStates Spectrum
15 March	New York City	United States	Madison Square Garden
17 March	East Rutherford	United States	Continental Airlines Arena
18 March	Portland	United States	Cumberland County Civic Center
19 March	Boston	United States	FleetCenter
21 March	Montreal	Canada	Montreal Forum
22 March (Note: Originally scheduled for 23 March.)	Toronto	Canada	SkyDome
24 March	Fairborn	United States	Ervin J. Nutter Center
25 March	Pittsburgh	United States	Civic Arena
27 March	Auburn Hills	United States	The Palace of Auburn Hills
28 March	Auburn Hills	United States	The Palace of Auburn Hills
30 March	Cleveland	United States	Gund Arena
31 March	Cleveland	United States	Gund Arena
1 April	St. Louis	United States	Kiel Center
2 April	Kansas City	United States	Kemper Arena
4 April	Dallas	United States	Reunion Arena
20 April	Oslo	Norway	Oslo Spektrum
21 April	Stockholm	Sweden	Globen Arena
23 April	Helsinki	Finland	Helsinki Ice Hall
25 April	Copenhagen	Denmark	Forum Copenhagen
26 April	Gothenburg	Sweden	Scandinavium
29 April	Kiel	Germany	Ostseehalle
30 April	Berlin	Germany	Deutschlandhalle
1 May	Leipzig	Germany	Messehalle
3 May	Utrecht	Netherlands	Prins Van Oranjehal
4 May	Frankfurt	Germany	Festhalle Frankfurt
5 May	Frankfurt	Germany	Festhalle Frankfurt
7 May	Dortmund	Germany	Westfalenhalle
8 May	Dortmund	Germany	Westfalenhalle
10 May	Stuttgart	Germany	Schleyerhalle
11 May	Zürich	Switzerland	Hallenstadion
12 May	Geneva	Switzerland	Geneva Arena
14 May	Bolzano	Italy	PalaOnda
15 May	Bologna	Italy	PalaDozza
16 May	Rome	Italy	PalaLottomatica
17 May	Milan	Italy	Filaforum
19 May	Vienna	Austria	Wiener Stadthalle
21 May	Mannheim	Germany	Maimarkthalle
22 May	Mannheim	Germany	Maimarkthalle
23 May	Liévin	France	Stade Couvert Régional
24 May	Paris	France	Palais Omnisports de Paris-Bercy
25 May	Paris	France	Palais Omnisports de Paris-Bercy
27 May	Munich	Germany	Olympiahalle
28 May	Munich	Germany	Olympiahalle
29 May	Prague	Czech Republic	Prague Sports Hall
1 June	Glasgow	Scotland	SECC Arena
2 June	Aberdeen	Scotland	AECC Arena
3 June	Newcastle upon Tyne	England	Newcastle Arena
17 June	Birmingham	England	NEC Arena
19 June	Manchester	England	MEN Arena
21 June	London	England	Wembley Arena
22 June	London	England	Wembley Arena
26 June	Dublin	Ireland	Point Theatre
28 June	Ghent	Belgium	Flanders Expo
29 June	Nancy	France	Zénith de Nancy
30 June	Lyon	France	Halle Tony Garnier
2 July	Barcelona	Spain	Palau Sant Jordi
3 July	Barcelona	Spain	Palau Sant Jordi
6 July	Lisbon	Portugal	Estádio do Restelo
9 July (Note: Originally scheduled for 4 July.)	Madrid	Spain	Plaza de Toros de Las Ventas
10 July	Madrid	Spain	Plaza de Toros de Las Ventas
11 July	Madrid	Spain	Plaza de Toros de Las Ventas
13 July	Bordeaux	France	Parc des Expositions
1 August	Wantagh	United States	Jones Beach Amphitheater
2 August	Hartford	United States	Meadows Music Theater
3 August	Buffalo	United States	Buffalo Memorial Auditorium
6 August	Winnipeg	Canada	Winnipeg Arena
8 August	Edmonton	Canada	Northlands Coliseum
10 August	Calgary	Canada	Olympic Saddledome
12 August	Seattle	United States	KeyArena
13 August	Portland	United States	Rose Garden Arena
15 August	Mountain View	United States	Shoreline Amphitheatre
16 August	Paradise	United States	Thomas & Mack Center
17 August	Irvine	United States	Irvine Meadows Amphitheatre
19 August	Denver	United States	McNichols Sports Arena
21 August	St. Louis	United States	Riverport Amphitheater
22 August	Oklahoma City	United States	Myriad Convention Center
24 August	New Orleans	United States	Lakefront Arena
26 August	Murfreesboro	United States	Murphy Center
27 August	Lexington	United States	Rupp Arena
28 August	Knoxville	United States	Thompson–Boling Arena
30 August	West Palm Beach	United States	Coral Sky Amphitheater
31 August	Jacksonville	United States	Jacksonville Coliseum
1 September	North Charleston	United States	North Charleston Coliseum
3 September	Winston-Salem	United States	Lawrence Joel Veterans Memorial Coliseum
6 September	Philadelphia	United States	CoreStates Spectrum
7 September	Albany	United States	Knickerbocker Arena
8 September	Worcester	United States	Worcester Centrum
10 September	Charleston	United States	Charleston Civic Center
12 September	Cincinnati	United States	Riverbend Music Center
13 September	Columbus	United States	Polaris Amphitheater
14 September	Tinley Park	United States	New World Music Theater
11 October	Curitiba	Brazil	Pedreira Paulo Leminski
12 October	São Paulo	Brazil	Estádio do Pacaembu
18 October	Buenos Aires	Argentina	River Plate Stadium
19 October	Buenos Aires	Argentina	River Plate Stadium
22 October	Santiago	Chile	Velódromo Estadio Nacional
2 November	Perth	Australia	Burswood Dome
5 November	Adelaide	Australia	Adelaide Entertainment Centre
7 November	Melbourne	Australia	Centre Court
8 November	Melbourne	Australia	Centre Court
9 November	Melbourne	Australia	Centre Court
11 November	Brisbane	Australia	Brisbane Entertainment Centre
13 November	Sydney	Australia	Sydney Entertainment Centre
14 November	Sydney	Australia	Sydney Entertainment Centre
15 November	Sydney	Australia	Sydney Entertainment Centre
17 November	Sydney	Australia	Sydney Entertainment Centre
18 November	Brisbane	Australia	Brisbane Entertainment Centre
21 November	Darwin	Australia	Marrara Oval
24 November	Cairns	Australia	Cairns Showgrounds
27 November	Auckland	New Zealand	Ericsson Stadium
30 November	Christchurch	New Zealand	Queen Elizabeth II Park

=== Cancelled dates ===
List of cancelled dates, showing date, city, country, venue and reason of cancellation
Date (1996)	City	Country	Venue	Reason
22 March	Quebec City	Canada	Colisée de Québec	—N/a
18 June	Birmingham	England	NEC Arena	—N/a
10 September	College Park	United States	Bryce Jordan Centre	—N/a

=== Box office score data ===
List of box office score data with date, city, venue, attendance, gross, references
Date (1996)	City	Venue	Attendance	Gross	Ref.
12 January	Greensboro, United States	Coliseum	15,899	$375,487	
13 January	Charlotte, United States	Coliseum	15,870	$387,982	
17 January	Memphis, United States	The Pyramid	16,463	$356,992	
18 January	Birmingham, United States	BJCC Arena	10,005 / 10,704	$245,123	
20 January	St. Petersburg, United States	Thunderdome	12,583 / 15,000	$293,974	
23 January	Atlanta, United States	Omni Arena	12,994	$331,347	
25 January	Houston, United States	Summit	13,433	$315,975	
27 January	San Antonio, United States	Alamodome	15,237	$361,482	
7 February	Portland, United States	Rose Garden	15,626 / 17,000	$355,740	
10 February	Tacoma, United States	Dome	19,397	$443,469	
13 February	Anaheim, United States	Arrowhead Pond	10,503 / 11,400	$241,742	
14 February	Phoenix, United States	America West Arena	12,737	$314,109	
16–17 February	Mexico City, Mexico	Sports Palace	29,304 / 31,218	$595,105	
2 March	Minneapolis, United States	Target Center	15,010	$367,745	
9 March	Chicago, United States	United Center	15,725	$393,125	
11 March	Louisville, United States	Freedom Hall	16,404	$390,138	
15 March	New York City, United States	Madison Square Garden	13,656	$461,770	
19 March	Boston, United States	FleetCenter	15,033	$428,441	
27–28 March	Auburn Hills, United States	Palace	32,887	$822,175	
30–31 March	Cleveland, United States	Gund Arena	35,082	$860,430	
4 April	Dallas, United States	Reunion Arena	15,671	$352,515	

== Personnel ==
- Brian Johnson – lead vocals
- Angus Young – lead guitar
- Malcolm Young – rhythm guitar, backing vocals
- Cliff Williams – bass, backing vocals
- Phil Rudd – drums
