= Hard as a Rock =

1995 single by AC/DC

Single by AC/DC

from the album Ballbreaker
- B-side: "Caught with Your Pants Down"
- Released: 18 September 1995
- Studio: Ocean Way (Los Angeles)
- Length: 4:31
- Label: Albert Productions; EMI
- Songwriters: Angus Young; Malcolm Young
- Producer: Rick Rubin

AC/DC singles chronology
| "Big Gun" (1993) | "Hard as a Rock" (1995) | "Hail Caesar" (1996) |

Music video
- "Hard as a Rock" on YouTube

"Hard as a Rock" is a song by the Australian hard rock band AC/DC, released in September 1995 as the first single from their 13th studio album, Ballbreaker. The song reached number one in Finland and number four in Norway whilst entering the top 20 in Australia, New Zealand, and Sweden. In the United States, it became AC/DC's second number-one hit on the Billboard Album Rock Tracks chart, after "Big Gun" in 1993.

Performances of the track have been included on three of AC/DC's live concert DVDs. These include No Bull (of which an audio version is found on the Australian tour edition of Stiff Upper Lip), Stiff Upper Lip Live and Live at the Circus Krone, which is featured in the Deluxe Edition of the 2009 boxset Backtracks. A live version recorded during the band's Stiff Upper Lip World Tour in 2001 at the Stade de France in Paris appears on the 2007 Plug Me In three-disc DVD. It is also featured on the 2012 film Battleship, along with "Thunderstruck".

== Critical reception ==
Pan-European magazine Music & Media noted upon the release of the single, "Like their inbetweenie 'Big Gun', it's produced by fan Rick Rubin, which marks a return to the original dry blues rock sound after a "pompous" period with Bruce Fairbairn." Music journalist Paul Moody of the British publication NME wrote, "What can Angus and co mean? 'Hard as a Rock' finds the DC, deliriously, back to the sort of form that made them high priests of gonzo rock several million years ago. Angus clunks out the sort of riff Billy Duffy spent ten years looking for in The Cult. 'Uncle' Brian Johnson starts howling the title in a manner not dissimilar to a castrated wildebeest and, erm, that's it, full throttle to the brain-scrambled mega-orgy of your choice. Not quite as testicle-crunchingly mega as 'Highway to Hell' or ultra-subtle 'live fave' 'The Jack', but no worries."

== Music video ==
The music video for "Hard as a Rock" was directed by British director David Mallet, and set at the Bray Studios in Windsor, Berkshire. Many fans gathered to be a part of this video, and can be seen in front of the stage, and also seen behind the bars which surrounds the stage the band plays on. Also, in the video, lead guitarist Angus Young is seen playing his Gibson SG on a wrecking ball, which destroys a building. Angus Young had stated in the documentary that he had a fear of heights when doing this before. The video can be seen on the 2000 DVD version of No Bull (which also includes the documentary on how the video was made) and the Backtracks box set.

== Track listings ==
- CD single
1. "Hard as a Rock" – 4:30
2. "Caught with Your Pants Down" – 4:14
- 7-inch single
1. "Hard as a Rock" (LP version) – 4:30
2. "Caught with Your Pants Down" (LP version) – 4:14

== Personnel ==
- Brian Johnson – lead vocals
- Angus Young – lead guitar
- Malcolm Young – rhythm guitar, backing vocals
- Cliff Williams – bass guitar, backing vocals
- Phil Rudd – drums, percussion

== Charts ==
=== Weekly charts ===
| Chart (1995) | Peak position |
|---|---|
| Australia (ARIA) | 14 |
| Belgium (Ultratop 50 Wallonia) | 30 |
| Canada Top Singles (RPM) | 27 |
| Europe (Eurochart Hot 100) | 11 |
| Finland (Suomen virallinen lista) | 1 |
| France (SNEP) | 26 |
| Germany (Media Control) | 25 |
| Ireland (IRMA) | 28 |
| Netherlands (Dutch Top 40 Tipparade) | 16 |
| Netherlands (Single Top 100 Tipparade) | 7 |
| New Zealand (RIANZ) | 16 |
| Norway (VG-lista) | 4 |
| Sweden (Topplistan) | 19 |
| Switzerland (Schweizer Hitparade) | 28 |
| UK Singles (Official Charts) | 33 |
| US Album Rock Tracks (Billboard) | 1 |

=== Year-end charts ===
| Chart (1995) | Position |
|---|---|
| Europe (Eurochart Hot 100) | 97 |
| US Album Rock Tracks (Billboard) | 38 |

| Chart (1996) | Position |
|---|---|
| US Mainstream Rock Tracks (Billboard) | 70 |

== Release history ==
| Region | Date | Format(s) | Label(s) | Ref. |
|---|---|---|---|---|
| United States | 12 September 1995 | Rock radio | EastWest | |
| Australia | 18 September 1995 | CD; cassette | Albert Productions; EMI | |
| United Kingdom | 18 September 1995 | 7-inch vinyl; CD | EastWest | |
| United States | 7 November 1995 | Contemporary hit radio | EastWest | |

== See also ==
- 1995 in music
- Hard rock music
