= Stiff Upper Lip (AC/DC song) =

2000 single by AC/DC

Single by AC/DC

from the album Stiff Upper Lip
- B-side: "Hard as a Rock" (live); "Ballbreaker"
- Released: 8 February 2000
- Studio: The Warehouse (Vancouver, British Columbia, Canada)
- Length: 3:34
- Label: Albert Productions; EMI
- Songwriters: Angus Young; Malcolm Young
- Producer: George Young

AC/DC singles chronology
"Cover You in Oil" (1996)	"Stiff Upper Lip" (2000)	"Safe in New York City" (2000)

Music video
- "Stiff Upper Lip" on YouTube

"Stiff Upper Lip" is a song by Australian rock band AC/DC, composed by Angus and Malcolm Young. It was released on 8 February 2000 as the lead single from their 14th studio album, Stiff Upper Lip (2000). The song gave the band their third number-one single on the US Billboard Mainstream Rock Tracks chart, and it entered the top five on the airplay charts of Poland and Spain.

== Music video ==
The music video, directed by Andy Morahan, starts with the band driving down the street in a red 1997 Hummer H1 when they get caught in a traffic jam. They then pull into a back alley, get out of the car, and begin to play the song on the street. The song that the band was listening to before the car jam was "It's a Long Way to the Top (If You Wanna Rock 'n' Roll)", a song released when the late Bon Scott was a member of the band. Lady Gaga made a cameo pre-fame.

== Track listing ==
1. "Stiff Upper Lip" – 3:34
2. "Hard as a Rock" (live) – 4:48
3. "Ballbreaker" (live) – 4:38

== Personnel ==
- Brian Johnson – lead vocals
- Angus Young – lead guitar
- Malcolm Young – rhythm guitar, backing vocals
- Cliff Williams – bass guitar, backing vocals
- Phil Rudd – drums

== Charts ==
=== Weekly charts ===
Weekly chart performance for "Stiff Upper Lip"
Chart (2000)	Peak position
Finland (Suomen virallinen lista)	18
Poland Airplay (Music & Media)	1
Scottish Singles Sales (Official Charts)	57
Spain Airplay (Music & Media)	4
UK Singles (Official Charts)	65
UK Rock & Metal (Official Charts)	3
US Bubbling Under Hot 100 (Billboard)	15
US Mainstream Rock Airplay (Billboard)	1

=== Year-end charts ===
Year-end chart performance for "Stiff Upper Lip"
Chart (2000)	Position
US Mainstream Rock Tracks (Billboard)	12

== Certifications ==
Certifications and sales for "Stiff Upper Lip"
Region	Certification	Certified units/sales
Canada (Music Canada)	Gold	40,000^{‡}
^{‡} Sales+streaming figures based on certification alone.

== Release history ==
Release dates and formats for "Stiff Upper Lip"
Region	Date	Format(s)	Label(s)	Ref.
United States	8 February 2000	Mainstream rock; active rock radio	EastWest	
United Kingdom	3 April 2000	CD	EMI	
Japan	24 January 2001	CD	Elektra	
