= Ballbreaker =

1995 studio album by AC/DC

Studio album by AC/DC
- Released: 25 September 1995
- Recorded: February – May 1995
- Studio: Ocean Way (Los Angeles)
- Genres: Hard rock; blues rock
- Length: 49:11
- Labels: Albert; East West
- Producer: Rick Rubin

AC/DC chronology
AC/DC Live (1992)	Ballbreaker (1995)	Bonfire (1997)

Singles from Ballbreaker
- 1. "Hard as a Rock" Released: 4 September 1995; 2. "Hail Caesar" Released: 19 February 1996; 3. "Cover You in Oil" Released: 3 June 1996

Ballbreaker is the thirteenth studio album by Australian hard rock band AC/DC. It was released on 25 September 1995 and was re-released in 2005 as part of the AC/DC Remasters series.

== Background ==
Ballbreaker marked the return of drummer Phil Rudd, who had played with AC/DC from 1975 to 1983. Rudd had left during the Flick of the Switch sessions due to drug problems and his incompatibility with Malcolm Young. According to Arnaud Durieux's book AC/DC: Maximum Rock & Roll, Rudd attended AC/DC's show in Auckland in November 1991 and, after a friendly meeting with the band backstage, made an "open-ended pitch" to rejoin if anything changed with the band's current drummer Chris Slade. Durieux reports that the band eventually invited Rudd to rejoin and he accepted in August 1994, much to the chagrin of Slade, who had been recording demos with the band in London. Slade told Rock Hard France in June 2001 that he was so disappointed and disgusted that he did not touch his drum kit for three years. Slade would eventually rejoin the band for their performance at the 57th Annual Grammy Awards Ceremony and the 2015 Rock or Bust World Tour following Rudd's legal issues involving illegal drug possession and threatening to kill his former personal assistant, both of which forced him out of the band a second time.

Ballbreaker is the only AC/DC album produced by Rick Rubin. Rubin had been a long-time fan of the band; former AC/DC engineer Tony Platt recalls overhearing the producer working with the Cult on their 1987 LP Electric:

Rick Rubin was recording the Cult in Studio A and we [Platt and the studio engineers] stood in the airlock just outside the studio. A snatch of Highway to Hell would get played and then a snatch from Back in Black and then a snatch of Led Zeppelin, and we thought, "What the hell's going on there?" [A studio assistant] said, "Well, he's getting the guitar sounds from Back in Black, the drum sound from Highway to Hell and the voice sound from Led Zeppelin!" Literally, as he was mixing he was getting a guitar sound on the Cult and then comparing it directly with the guitar sound that he wanted to get from Back in Black. The same with all the other instruments.

Rubin's first assignment with AC/DC had been "Big Gun", which appeared on the soundtrack for the Arnold Schwarzenegger movie Last Action Hero. The song was a hit, becoming Billboard's number 1 rock track and hit number 5 on the Canadian charts.

== Recording ==
The album took five months to record. Production started at the Record Plant Studios in New York City, but the band became dissatisfied with the sound there and moved to Los Angeles' Ocean Way Studios. Getting the right drum sound at the Record Plant had proved impossible, with Rubin even isolating the drums in a tent in the studio and lining the walls and ceiling with material to soak up the extra sound the room generated. Although the band was immediately satisfied with the Ocean Way Studios, Rubin and Malcolm Young clashed over the album's direction, with Rubin demanding as many as 50 retakes on some songs, and rumours persist that Rubin was often absent from the studio and left the band to their own devices while he reportedly saw to the recording of the Red Hot Chili Peppers' One Hot Minute album at the same time. In a 1995 interview with Guitar World, Young played down the tension between him and Rubin, although he did admit to Le Monde in October 2000, "Working with him was a mistake." Mike Fraser was also credited for recording, engineering and mixing the album. Marvel Comics contributed to Ballbreaker's cover art.

== Composition ==
"Burnin' Alive" was written about the cult followers in Waco, Texas, who were burnt to death in 1993 during a raid by the authorities, while "Hard as a Rock", the album's first single, dated back to the Who Made Who sessions. The music video for "Hard as a Rock" was directed by David Mallet and was set at the Bray Studios in Windsor, Berkshire. In the video, which is reminiscent of the Mallet-directed "Thunderstruck" from 1990, lead guitarist Angus Young is seen playing his Gibson SG on a wrecking ball, which destroys a building. "Cover You in Oil" features a typically licentious lyric ("I see a young girl in the neighbourhood...I must confess I'd like to run my hands up and down her legs..."). "The Furor" and "Hail Caesar" also see the band making an uncharacteristic dip into social commentary. Malcolm Young stated in an interview:

I think: stand up and be counted. If there's anyone that takes it like we want to promote a Nazi regime or something, these people are usually the ones that want to promote a total Christian regime. I don't like this politically correct thing on the planet at the moment, to be honest with you. I don't mind it if it doesn't interfere with you on the street, but the day they screw around with your cigarettes and everything else - and there's a lot of cigarettes smoked in AC/DC in all that music you hear - it might not be the same if it was all gone. I just don't like being told what to do, basically like anyone.

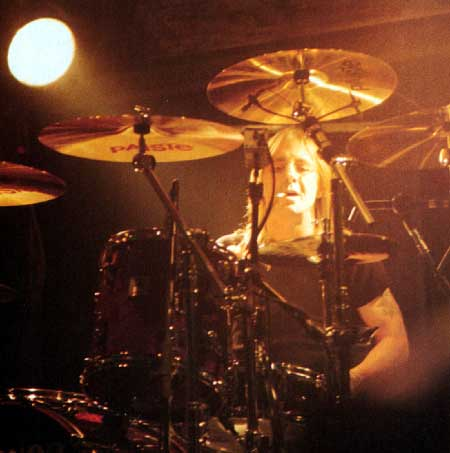
Phil Rudd performs at the Tacoma Dome in Tacoma on 12 August 1996

== Reception ==
Professional ratings
Review scores
Source	Rating
AllMusic	3/5 stars
The Encyclopedia of Popular Music	3/5 stars
Entertainment Weekly	B
Rolling Stone	2/5 stars
Select	4/5 medals

The initial shipments of Ballbreaker, outside of Japan and Australia, were 2.5 million copies. In AC/DC's native Australia, Ballbreaker topped the ARIA Charts and was certified gold on release day, with 35,000 units sold. The album reached the top 10 in many countries, including number 4 in the US, number 6 in the UK, and topping the Finland, Sweden and Switzerland charts. It is currently certified 2× platinum by the RIAA in the US, for sales in excess of two million.

Jancee Dunn of Rolling Stone awarded the album two out of five stars, writing, "Their longevity can be credited to two factors: nostalgia and the fact that AC/DC still view the world through the mind of a horny 15-year-old. God knows there's more than enough of them to go around."

AllMusic's Stephen Thomas Erlewine notes, "Although 'Hard as a Rock' comes close, there aren't any songs as immediately memorable as any of their '70s classics, or even 'Moneytalks.' However, unlike any record since Back in Black, there are no bad songs on the album."

Ultimate Classic Rock stated: "With the Young brothers' songwriting confidence restored by their recent chart revival, Rudd's inimitable percussive prowess making AC/DC sound like themselves once again, and Rubin's almost religious commitment to unearthing the band's authentic '70s sound (even hunting down rare, surviving Marshall valve amplifiers – not digital), Ballbreaker had all the makings of an AC/DC purist's dream-come-true, plus a little something for almost everyone."

== Track listing ==
All tracks are written by Angus Young and Malcolm Young.

Ballbreaker track listing
No.	Title	Length
1.	"Hard as a Rock"	4:31
2.	"Cover You in Oil"	4:32
3.	"The Furor"	4:10
4.	"Boogie Man"	4:07
5.	"The Honey Roll"	5:34
6.	"Burnin' Alive"	5:05
7.	"Hail Caesar"	5:14
8.	"Love Bomb"	3:14
9.	"Caught with Your Pants Down"	4:14
10.	"Whiskey on the Rocks"	4:35
11.	"Ballbreaker"	4:31
Total length:		49:11

== Personnel ==
AC/DC

- Brian Johnson – lead vocals
- Angus Young – lead guitar
- Malcolm Young – rhythm guitar, backing vocals
- Cliff Williams – bass guitar, backing vocals
- Phil Rudd – drums, percussion

Production

- Produced by Rick Rubin
- Co-Produced by Mike Fraser
- Pre-production Engineer: Noel Rafferty
- Recorded, engineered and mixed by Mike Fraser
- Assistant recording engineers: Mark Dernley, Steve Holroyd, Brandon Harris, Kyle Bess, Rory Romano
- Mastered by George Marino
- Album art: David McMacken

== Charts ==
=== Weekly charts ===
Chart (1995–2008)	Peak position
Australian Albums (ARIA)	1
Austrian Albums (Ö3 Austria)	2
Belgian Albums (Ultratop Wallonia)	3
Canada Top Albums/CDs (RPM)	4
Dutch Albums (Album Top 100)	28
Finnish Albums (Suomen virallinen lista)	1
German Albums (Offizielle Top 100)	4
Hungarian Albums (MAHASZ)	12
Japanese Albums (Oricon)	194
Norwegian Albums (VG-lista)	4
New Zealand Albums (RMNZ)	2
Swedish Albums (Sverigetopplistan)	1
Swiss Albums (Schweizer Hitparade)	3
UK Albums (Official Charts)	6
UK Rock & Metal Albums (Official Charts)	1
US Billboard 200	4

=== Year-end charts ===
Chart (1995)	Position
Australian Albums (ARIA)	47
Austrian Albums (Ö3 Austria)	39
Belgian Albums (Ultratop Wallonia)	89
German Albums (Offizielle Top 100)	42
Swiss Albums (Schweizer Hitparade)	37
US Billboard 200	162

Chart (1996)	Position
US Billboard 200	147

== Certifications ==
Region	Certification	Certified units/sales
Argentina (CAPIF)	Gold	30,000^{^}
Australia (ARIA)	3× Platinum	210,000^{^}
Austria (IFPI Austria)	Gold	25,000^{*}
Canada (Music Canada)	Gold	50,000^{‡}
Finland (Musiikkituottajat)	Gold	38,732
France (SNEP)	Platinum	300,000^{*}
Germany (BVMI)	Gold	250,000^{^}
New Zealand (RMNZ)	Platinum	15,000^{^}
Spain (Promusicae)	Platinum	100,000^{^}
Sweden (GLF)	Gold	50,000^{^}
Switzerland (IFPI Switzerland)	Gold	25,000^{^}
United Kingdom (BPI)	Gold	100,000^{*}
United States (RIAA)	2× Platinum	2,000,000^{^}
^{*} Sales figures based on certification alone.^{^} Shipments figures based on certification alone.^{‡} Sales+streaming figures based on certification alone.
