= Nervous Shakedown =

1984 single by AC/DC

Single by AC/DC

from the album Flick of the Switch
- B-side: "Rock And Roll Ain't Noise Pollution" (live); Brain Shake (Aus)
- Released: 27 July 1984 (UK)
- Recorded: April 1983
- Studio: Compass Point (Nassau)
- Genre: Hard rock
- Length: 4:25
- Label: Albert; Atlantic
- Songwriters: Angus Young; Malcolm Young; Brian Johnson
- Producer: AC/DC

AC/DC singles chronology
"Flick of the Switch" (1983)	"Nervous Shakedown" (1984)	"Danger" (1985)

Music video
- "Nervous Shakedown" on YouTube

"Nervous Shakedown" is the fourth song on the AC/DC album Flick of the Switch, released in 1983. It was written by Angus Young, Malcolm Young and Brian Johnson. It charted in the UK at No. 35, staying on the charts for five weeks. It also reached No. 20 in Ireland.

== Releases and videos ==
"Nervous Shakedown" was released as a maxi-single or EP in 1984. The songs included on this release are: A1. "Nervous Shakedown"; A2. "Rock And Roll Ain't Noise Pollution" (live Detroit '83); B1. "Sin City" (live Detroit '83); B2. "This House Is on Fire" (live Detroit '83).

Two videos were made for the track. The first video was filmed on the same set and in the same format as the videos for "Flick of the Switch" and "Guns For Hire". However, another version was filmed which features the group on stage at the Joe Louis Arena in Detroit, MI, during a before-show rehearsal.

== Reception ==
Muriel Gray at Smash Hits said, "We've heard it all before. AC/DC are competent at churning out this nonsense, but they should start acting the age they look."

== Personnel ==
- Brian Johnson – lead vocals
- Angus Young – lead guitar
- Malcolm Young – rhythm guitar, backing vocals
- Cliff Williams – bass guitar, backing vocals
- Phil Rudd – drums

== Charts ==
Chart (1984)	Peak position
UK Singles (Official Charts)	35
Uruguay (AP)	4
