= Let's Get It Up =

1982 single by AC/DC

- Single sleeve as issued in the UK

Single by AC/DC

from the album For Those About to Rock (We Salute You)
- B-side: "Snowballed" (US); "Back in Black" (live) (UK)
- Released: 29 January 1982 (UK)
- Recorded: 1981
- Genre: Hard rock; blues rock
- Length: 3:54
- Label: Atlantic
- Songwriters: Angus Young; Malcolm Young; Brian Johnson
- Producer: Robert John "Mutt" Lange

AC/DC singles chronology
"Rock and Roll Ain't Noise Pollution" (1980)	"Let's Get It Up" (1982)	"For Those About to Rock (We Salute You)" (1982)

Music video
- "Let's Get It Up" on YouTube

Original US cover

"Let's Get It Up" is a song by Australian hard rock band AC/DC, first released on their 1981 album For Those About to Rock We Salute You, and later as its first single.

Singer Brian Johnson summarised the track to Kerrang!'s Sylvie Simmons as "Filth, pure filth. We're a filthy band."

Live versions of "Back in Black" and "T.N.T.", released as B-sides on the UK's version of the single, were both recorded in Landover, Maryland, in December 1981. "T.N.T." only appeared on the 12-inch edition.

== Reception ==
When reviewing the song in the context of For Those About to Rock, Kurt Loder wrote: "It may seem difficult to take a droolflecked runt dressed in schoolboy shorts seriously as a guitarist, but if you listen closely to Angus Young's serpentine solo in 'Let's Get It Up', you'll hear his unabashed blues roots shining through."

Record World called it a "cracking rocker with its celebratory chorus."

== Chart positions ==
=== Weekly charts ===
Chart (1982)	Peak position
Australia (Kent Music Report)	73
Canada Top Singles (RPM)	9
German Singles Chart	33
Sweden (Sverigetopplistan)	18
US Billboard	44
US Mainstream Rock (Billboard)	9

=== Year-end charts ===
Chart (1982)	Position
Canada Top Singles (RPM)	85

== Single track listing ==
1. "Let's Get It Up" – 3:56
2. "Back in Black" (Recorded live Friday, December 4th, 1981) – 4:01
3. "T.N.T." (Recorded live Friday, December 4th, 1981) – 3:55
4. "Love Hungry Man" - 4:52
5. "Shoot to Thrill" - 5:45
6. "Snowballed" - 3:23
7. "Night Prowler" - 7:00
