= For Those About to Rock (We Salute You) =

1982 single by AC/DC

Single by AC/DC

from the album For Those About to Rock We Salute You
- B-side: "Let There Be Rock" (live) "T.N.T." (live) (US)
- Released: 25 June 1982
- Recorded: 1981
- Genre: Hard rock
- Length: 5:43
- Label: Atlantic
- Songwriters: Angus Young; Malcolm Young; Brian Johnson
- Producer: Robert John "Mutt" Lange

AC/DC singles chronology
"Let's Get It Up" (1981)	"For Those About to Rock (We Salute You)" (1982)	"Guns for Hire" (1983)

Music video
- "For Those About to Rock (We Salute You)" on YouTube

"For Those About to Rock (We Salute You)" is a song by the Australian hard rock band AC/DC. The song was first released on AC/DC's eighth studio album For Those About to Rock We Salute You in 1981, and later as a single in 1982. The single's B-side contains an edited live version of "Let There Be Rock", recorded in Landover, Maryland, in late 1981. The video to "For Those About to Rock (We Salute You)" was filmed at that same concert.

The song was later included on AC/DC's first soundtrack album, Who Made Who, released in 1986 for the Stephen King film Maximum Overdrive.

== Inspiration ==
The title and central lyric of the song are based on an ancient salute used by Roman prisoners to be executed in the Colosseum, "Ave, Caesar, morituri te salutant" ("Hail Caesar, those who are about to die salute you").

In February 2021, speaking to Zane Lowe on Essentials Radio on Apple Music 1, Angus Young revealed that the inspiration behind the song was British poet, novelist and classicist Robert Graves. Young explained to Lowe that the song's title was originally inspired by a twist on a line by Graves.

"For Those About To Rock, it came out with Malcolm and myself, it was a combination," Young explained, revealing how he wrote "a little guitar thing" in the intro to the song, and Malcolm "had this little guitar chordal progression." "So the two of us worked on that and we came up with the verse idea of it," Young explained. "And the funny thing is, when we got to the chorus, we were going, "Okay, what are we going to sing on this?" And for me, I just thought, well, sometimes I go back [to] something I've read somewhere, and there was the writer Robert Graves, I believe his name was, I think he had a book out or a story he had put in one of the papers, because he did a lot of history stuff. And I had read it and it was, "For those about to die," and he went into a day in the Coliseum or somewhere in Rome at the time and the thing that the gladiators did. And I thought, "That might fit." So it was a case of, if I can come up with a way of singing something that can sing into it. I think at first Malcolm thought, "Wait. What is he on?" And I'm going, "Well, for those about to ..." And I got it in, I got it all in, "For those about the rock." So that kicked off that."

Angus Young later said that the inspiration for the cannons came from a very different source than the song. The band was cutting the first recordings of the song on the same day as Prince Charles and Princess Diana's televised wedding. Angus recalled that "someone had the wedding on in the next room ... we were playing that part of the song when the cannons were going off and we paused a second and went 'hmmm ... that actually sounds pretty good.'" This coincidence also led to a cannon being featured on the cover of the album and single, as well as life-sized Napoleonic cannons becoming a regular stage prop at AC/DC concerts. The cannons fired in the song are mixed with exploding fireworks. However the actual takes were recorded later the next month as the mobile truck used to record the album (Mobile One) was being used to record Peter Gabriel's 4th eponymous album during the marriage of Charles and Diana.

== Reception ==
Record World said that "Brian Johnson's vocal sounds like a wildcat in heat and the crazed guitar assault calls to mind a pack of hungry wolves on the prowl."

== Live performances ==
AC/DC have closed their concerts with the track since the tour for the album in 1981/82. The only times when they have not closed with it are when they rarely have played an additional encore, or due to the show being cut short for technical reasons. At a European show in 1984, the cannons setting off caused the sound systems to shut down multiple times during the song resulting in them having to pause the song to resolve this.

== Personnel ==
- Brian Johnson – lead vocals
- Angus Young – lead guitar
- Malcolm Young – rhythm guitar, backing vocals
- Cliff Williams – bass guitar, backing vocals
- Phil Rudd – drums

== Charts ==
Chart (1982)	Peak position
US Mainstream Rock (Billboard)	4
UK Singles (Official Charts)	15

== Certifications ==
Region	Certification	Certified units/sales
Canada (Music Canada)	Platinum	80,000^{‡}
New Zealand (RMNZ)	Gold	15,000^{‡}
^{‡} Sales+streaming figures based on certification alone.

== TISM version ==
"For Those About to Rock"

Single by TISM
- Released: 17 November 2020
- Recorded: May 1995
- Studio: Platinum Studios, South Yarra
- Genre: Alternative rock
- Length: 4:50
- Label: genre b. goode/DRW Entertainment
- Songwriters: Angus Young, Malcolm Young, Brian Johnson, Lord Byron; arr. TISM

TISM singles chronology
"Everyone Else Has Had More Sex Than Me" (2005)	"For Those About to Rock" (2020)	"Mistah Eliot - He Wanker" (2021)

Australian alternative rock band TISM had recorded a version of "For Those About to Rock" in 1995, allegedly for an AC/DC tribute compilation. For unknown reasons, the compilation was scrapped and the track remained unreleased, apart from three snippets leaked at some point during the 2000s. That version of the song incorporated verses from Lord Byron's "So, We'll Go No More a-Roving".

The song was finally released as a single on 17 November 2020. Its B-side, "Let's Hang Around the Shopping Centre", is a demo recorded in October 1998.

== See also ==
- Cannon § In popular culture
