= Guns for Hire (disambiguation) =

Guns for Hire may refer to:

- "Guns for Hire", a song by AC/DC
- Guns for Hire (film), 1932 film
- "Chapter 22: Guns for Hire", an episode of The Mandalorian
