= Flick of the Switch (song) =

1984 single by AC/DC

Single by AC/DC

from the album Flick of the Switch
- B-side: "Badlands"
- Released: March 1984 (US)
- Recorded: April 1983
- Studio: Compass Point (Nassau)
- Genre: Hard rock
- Length: 3:13
- Label: Atlantic
- Songwriter(s): Angus Young; Malcolm Young; Brian Johnson
- Producer(s): AC/DC

AC/DC singles chronology
"Guns for Hire" (1983)	"Flick of the Switch" (1984)	"Nervous Shakedown" (1984)

Music video
- "Flick of the Switch" on YouTube

"Flick of the Switch" is a single by the Australian rock band AC/DC, from the album Flick of the Switch, released in 1983. It was written by Angus Young, Malcolm Young, and Brian Johnson.

It was released as a single only in certain territories, mainly Australia, Canada and the United States.

== Music video ==
The music video for the song "Flick of the Switch" was done in a similar format to the music videos for the album Back in Black. The video shows the band playing the song inside of what was later revealed to be a closed up airplane hangar, surrounded by flight cases with the AC/DC logo painted on them. Some versions of the video start with a short clip from a rehearsal tape of the band that shows Angus practicing dance moves for his onstage striptease while one of the band members, presumably Brian Johnson, sings in the background and the rest of the band laugh. However, the video on the Family Jewels DVD removes this.

Said Malcolm Young later of the simple approach to the video, "We basically told the film crew, 'We'll be playing – you film. Walk around the band – do whatever the fuck you want. We just want it done today'."

Drummer Phil Rudd had left the band by the time the video was recorded, and his replacement Simon Wright is featured instead.

== Personnel ==
- Brian Johnson – vocals
- Angus Young – lead guitar
- Malcolm Young – rhythm guitar
- Cliff Williams – bass guitar
- Phil Rudd – drums
