= Flick of the Switch =

1983 studio album by AC/DC

Studio album by AC/DC
- Released: 19 August 1983
- Recorded: April – May 1983
- Studio: Compass Point (Nassau)
- Genre: Hard rock
- Length: 37:02
- Label: Albert; Atlantic
- Producer: AC/DC

AC/DC chronology
For Those About to Rock We Salute You (1981)	Flick of the Switch (1983)	'74 Jailbreak (1984)

Singles from Flick of The Switch
- 1. "Guns for Hire" Released: September 1983; 2. "Flick of the Switch" Released: March 1984 (US); 3. "Nervous Shakedown" Released: July 1984 (UK)

Flick of the Switch is the ninth studio album by Australian hard rock band AC/DC. The album was deemed a commercial disappointment after it failed to match the sales figures of the band's two previous releases, 1980's Back in Black and 1981's For Those About to Rock, and its release represented the beginning of the band's commercial decline. The third AC/DC album to feature lead vocalist Brian Johnson, the album is also the last to feature drummer Phil Rudd before his return on Ballbreaker (1995). The album was re-released in 2003 as part of the AC/DC Remasters series.

== Recording ==
AC/DC returned to Compass Point Studios in the Bahamas to record their ninth album, the same studio where they had recorded Back in Black with Robert John "Mutt" Lange in 1980. Lange had produced AC/DC's three previous releases but this time the band chose to produce themselves. On the recorded commentary on the album for the Live at Donington DVD, the band members state that the album was an attempt to make the band raw again, and were happy with the result. In the book AC/DC: Maximum Rock & Roll, AC/DC engineer Tony Platt recalls:

There was a genuine desire to get back to the basics with Flick of the Switch. There was a general kind of consensus that we needed to find some way of moving on a little bit. You know the Johnny Winter version of Muddy Waters' 'Mannish Boy?' Where they're all shouting in the background? Basically what Mal had said was that he wanted to try and get that feeling of being in a room with it all happening. I don't think it really worked entirely.

The album is notable for its "dry" sound, with very little of the polish that is evident on their previous effort For Those About to Rock We Salute You. In a 1984 interview, Angus Young said of the LP, "We wanted this one as raw as possible. We wanted a natural, but big, sound for the guitars. We didn't want echoes and reverb going everywhere and noise eliminators and noise extractors."

However, the album's birth was a troubled one; after having problems with Malcolm as well as drugs and alcohol, drummer Phil Rudd was fired midway through the album's recording sessions, although he had completed his drum parts. According to Murray Engleheart's band memoir AC/DC: Maximum Rock & Roll, Rudd had been struggling for some time; tour manager Ian Jeffrey recalls getting a phone call from a strung-out Rudd at four in the morning when the band was playing in Nebraska on the Back in Black tour and finding the drummer in his hotel room in a state of disorientated agitation. Eventually Rudd broke down crying and begged Jeffrey, "Don't tell Malcolm." Jeffrey also reveals that Malcolm punched the drummer after he showed up two hours late for the band's show at Long Island's Nassau Coliseum and was unable to play the last song of the encore. "It was an absolutely stupid thing that finished it, but it had been brewing for a long, long time," Jeffrey remembers. "He got into drugs and got burned out," Malcolm later explained to KNAC.com in August 2000. Former Procol Harum drummer B.J. Wilson was hired to help complete the recording if needed, but his contributions were not used. Platt later recalled to band biographer Jesse Fink, "It wasn't a happiest of albums. There were all sorts of tensions within the band. They were all pretty knackered by that point. It was the album that copped the backlash, really." The drum position was eventually filled by future Dio drummer Simon Wright after more than 700 auditions were held in the US and UK. Simon Kirke of Free and Bad Company fame, and Paul Thompson of Roxy Music were two of the drummers auditioned. Wright appeared in the videos for "Flick of the Switch", "Nervous Shakedown", and "Guns for Hire". A second video for "Nervous Shakedown" was also shot at a pre-show rehearsal at Joe Louis Arena in Detroit. He also toured for the album, and is seen in the pro-shot video recordings from that period.

The songs on Flick of the Switch contain much of the outlaw bravado ("Guns for Hire", "Badlands") and sexual innuendo ("Rising Power", "Deep in the Hole") that fans had come to expect from the Australian rockers. The song "Bedlam in Belgium" was inspired by the band's appearance at Kontich when a riot nearly broke out when police tried to close down the show after the band allegedly ignored a strict 11 p.m. curfew. On tour in support of the album, "Guns for Hire" was the set opener. The tour resulted in more upheaval in the band's inner circle when Malcolm, frustrated by mixed reviews for Flick of the Switch and dwindling audience numbers in certain cities, fired tour manager Ian Jeffrey. In his Bon Scott memoir Highway to Hell, author Clinton Walker observes:

...when the band reemerged in August 1983, with the album Flick of the Switch, they found they weren't able to just pick up where they'd left off. The production credit the album bore, to Malcolm and Angus themselves, was merely the tip of the iceberg of a purging the pair had effected throughout the entire band and its infrastructure. It's a classic syndrome: the successful campaigner who fears his own troops. But Malcolm and Angus never trusted anyone anyway. They sacked practically everybody: Mutt Lange, who had artistically engineered their breakthrough; drummer Phil Rudd; Peter Mensch, who had himself usurped Michael Browning, even de-facto photographer Robert Ellis was ousted. The replacement of Rudd by Englishman Simon Wright meant that there wasn't an Australian-born member left in the band.

== Album cover ==
The Flick of the Switch cover is a simple, pencil-drawn picture of Angus Young hanging from a giant power switch, illustrated by artist Brent Richardson, that Young had sketched out to reflect the simple, raw approach of the album. Atlantic Records hated it. Angus had wanted the album graphics to be embossed the same way that Back in Black had been but, according to Ian Jeffrey, Atlantic did not want to spend the money because they believed the album contained no hit singles.

== Reception ==
Professional ratings
Review scores
Source	Rating
AllMusic	2/5 stars
Blender	2/5 stars
Collector's Guide to Heavy Metal	10/10
The Encyclopedia of Popular Music	2/5 stars
Rolling Stone	3/5 stars

Recorded shortly after their 1982 European tour at the beginning of 1983, the album was originally released with little promotion in the US on 19 August 1983. The album reached No. 4 in UK and No. 15 in the US, and has been certified platinum by the RIAA. In his original Rolling Stone review, David Fricke noted, "Produced by the band, Flick of the Switch isn't quite the monster blowout that 1980's Back in Black was, and the Youngs' retooling of old riffs for new hits also teeters on self-plagiarism at times." Canadian journalist Martin Popoff considered the album "the blinding furious peak of the Brian Johnson era", where AC/DC recaptured "the raw edge lost during the Mutt Lange years... even if the songs were starting to relive past glories". Steve Huey of AllMusic was of the same opinion, writing that "as perhaps indicated by the record's idiotic original title, the utterly generic I Like to Rock, AC/DC seemed to be running out of ideas at an alarming rate, and their record sales began to reflect that fact." Malcolm Young later said of the LP, "It was thrown together real quick. I wouldn't say it's a great album..."

Cash Box said of the title track that it "blasts off in suitable fashion with a basic hard rock guitar riff from Angus Young followed by Brian Johnson’s just-as-basic hard rock squeals" and the rest of the song follows in kind, consistent with the song's lyrics that "with a flick of the switch she’ll blow you sky high."

== Track listing ==
All tracks are written by Angus Young, Malcolm Young and Brian Johnson.

Side one
No.	Title	Length
1.	"Rising Power"	3:43
2.	"This House Is on Fire"	3:23
3.	"Flick of the Switch"	3:13
4.	"Nervous Shakedown"	4:27
5.	"Landslide"	3:57

Side two
No.	Title	Length
6.	"Guns for Hire"	3:24
7.	"Deep in the Hole"	3:19
8.	"Bedlam in Belgium"	3:52
9.	"Badlands"	3:38
10.	"Brain Shake"	4:00
Total length:		37:02

== Personnel ==
AC/DC

- Brian Johnson – lead vocals
- Angus Young – lead guitar
- Malcolm Young – rhythm guitar, backing vocals
- Cliff Williams – bass guitar, backing vocals
- Phil Rudd – drums

Production

- AC/DC – production, cover design
- Tony Platt – engineering, mixing
- Barry Harris, Benjamin Armbrister, Gary Helman – assistant engineers
- Bob Ludwig – mastering at Masterdisk, New York

== Charts ==
Chart performance for Flick of the Switch
Chart (1983)	Peak position
Australian Albums (Kent Music Report)	3
Austrian Albums (Ö3 Austria)	9
Canada Top Albums/CDs (RPM)	12
Dutch Albums (Album Top 100)	10
Finnish Albums (Suomen virallinen lista)	3
German Albums (Offizielle Top 100)	6
New Zealand Albums (RMNZ)	8
Norwegian Albums (VG-lista)	4
Swedish Albums (Sverigetopplistan)	8
Swiss Albums (Schweizer Hitparade)	28
UK Albums (OCC)	4
US Billboard 200	15

== Certifications ==
Region	Certification	Certified units/sales
Australia (ARIA)	3× Platinum	210,000^{^}
France (SNEP)	Gold	100,000^{*}
Germany (BVMI)	Gold	250,000^{^}
United Kingdom (BPI)	Gold	100,000^{^}
United States (RIAA)	Platinum	1,000,000^{^}
^{*} Sales figures based on certification alone.^{^} Shipments figures based on certification alone.
