= Guns for Hire =

1984 single by AC/DC

Single by AC/DC

from the album Flick of the Switch
- B-side: "Landslide"
- Released: September 1983
- Recorded: April 1983
- Studio: Compass Point (Nassau)
- Genre: Hard rock
- Length: 3:24
- Label: Albert; Atlantic
- Songwriters: Angus Young; Malcolm Young; Brian Johnson
- Producer: AC/DC

AC/DC singles chronology
"For Those About to Rock (We Salute You)" (1982)	"Guns for Hire" (1983)	"Flick of the Switch" (1983)

Music video
- "Guns for Hire" on YouTube

"Guns for Hire" is a song by Australian hard rock band AC/DC, from their album Flick of the Switch, released on 19 August 1983. Written by band members, Angus Young, Malcolm Young and Brian Johnson, it was also released in September as a single with "Landslide" as the B-side. It charted at No. 37 on the UK Singles Chart, and No. 84 on the United States Billboard Hot 100. It also reached No. 19 in Ireland.

Cash Box said that "raucous as ever, the track includes a matured guitar solo and is fused with a high rock ‘n’ roll energy."

The track served as the opening song during the band's performances on the tour in support of Flick of the Switch, but has never been performed on any other AC/DC tours since. A promotional video was produced for the song, which featured drummer Simon Wright rather than Phil Rudd. Rudd had left the band during the recording of Flick of the Switch and was replaced by Wright before the start of the tour.

== Personnel ==
- Brian Johnson – lead vocals
- Angus Young – lead guitar
- Malcolm Young – rhythm guitar, backing vocals
- Cliff Williams – bass guitar, backing vocals
- Phil Rudd – drums

== Charts ==
Chart (1983)	Peak position
UK Singles (Official Charts)	37
US Billboard Hot 100	84
US Mainstream Rock	37
