= Marcus Hook Roll Band =

Australian rock band (1972–1974)

- Origin: London, England
- Years active: 1972–1974
- Labels: Regal Zonophone; EMI; Albert
- Spinoffs: AC/DC; Flash and the Pan
- Spinoff of: The Easybeats
- Past members: Harry Vanda; George Young; Alex Young; Iain Campbell; Freddie Smith; John Proud; Howard Casey; Angus Young; Malcolm Young

Marcus Hook Roll Band were a studio group formed in London in 1972, by Harry Vanda and George Young (both ex-the Easybeats) as a session band to record their songwriting efforts. The group had two versions from London and Sydney – formed in mid-1973, when Vanda and Young returned to Australia. They issued three singles – "Natural Man" (1972), "Louisiana Lady" (1973) and "Can't Stand the Heat" (1974) – and one album – Tales of Old Grand-Daddy (1974). It is noted for being the first recording experience for Malcolm and Angus Young prior to forming AC/DC.

== History ==
Harry Vanda and George Young (both ex-the Easybeats) returned to London in 1970 to work as Vanda & Young, "freelance song writers, session men and producers". From 1970 to 1971 the duo worked on a number of one-off projects under various names. They released two singles, "Natural Man" (August 1972) and "Louisiana Lady" (March 1973) as Marcus Hook Roll Band with Wally Waller (Pretty Things) producing for EMI. Two Waller songs were used for the B-sides, "Boogalooing is for Wooing" and "Hoochie Coochie Har Kau". For the London recordings at Abbey Road Studios the Marcus Hook Roll Band were Vanda on guitar and vocals, George on vocals, rhythm guitar, piano and bass guitar, Alex Young on saxophone, Iain Campbell on bass guitar and Freddie Smith on drums. Albert Productions release "Natural Man" in Australia but it is an inferior version to that released in England, possible a demo, as Vanda & Young were in the habit of sending all their demos to Ted Albert in Sydney for him to use as he wished.

In 1973 Vanda and Young returned to Australia. Their first project was meant to be the re-launch of Stevie Wright's career. But out of the blue came a message from Wally Waller that Capitol Records in the USA were showing interest and wanted an album. So Waller came to Sydney and with engineer Richard Lush they worked on the album. Vanda & Young had plenty of songs up their sleeve so they started from scratch. George invited his younger brothers along to observe and learn the recording process. Malcolm Young undoubtedly played on the record. Angus Young was definitely present but it is unclear if any of his guitar work is on the record as his name does not appear on any of the production notes. In the absence of Ian Campbell, Harry and George shared the lead vocals between themselves. Harry played guitar and George bass. John Proud was brought in on the drums. Some saxophone by Howie Casey was added when Waller took the tapes back to London for mixing.

The project released one album, Tales of Old Grand-Daddy (March 1974), which was originally issued only in Australia on Albert Productions/EMI. Many of the details surrounding Tales of Old Grand-Daddy remain forgotten due to excessive alcohol consumption during the recording sessions. Its tracks had been recorded at EMI Studios between July and August 1973. By the time the album had appeared Angus and Malcolm had already formed AC/DC in Sydney. Vanda & Young had no intention of promoting it and Capitol lost interest. The record died and was only released in Australia. But over the years it became a bit of a cult classic attracting high prices whenever a rare copy became available.

George Young was furious with the artwork on the original LP which was a sketch of an old man, supposedly a grand-daddy, in a rocking chair smoking a pipe. In truth the title was a reference to the duty free Old Grand-dad Bourbon supplied by Waller that fueled the recording sessions.

Tales of Old Grand-Daddy was belatedly released in the USA in 1979 with plain cover art and the song "Louisiana Lady" replacing the bluesy "Cry for Me" on Capitol's "green label" budget series (#SN-11991); in the wake of Vanda & Young's Flash and the Pan album. They also released a third single "Can't Stand the Heat" / "Moonshine Blues" in 1974. Tales of Old Grand-Daddy was re-issued in 1981, titled Full File, with two non-album singles added. A CD version of the album was also re-issued in 1994 through Albert Productions/Sony Music.

On 2 June 2014, a new remastered version was released on LP and CD. They featured new artwork better reflecting the real meaning of the title. The CD contains several bonus tracks: The original versions of "Natural Man" and "Louisiana Lady"; "Moonshine Blues" (written by Wally Waller); and two previously unreleased tracks uncovered with the master tapes "One of these Days" and "Ride Baby Ride".

== Discography ==
=== Studio albums ===
Title	Album details	Peak chart positions
Title	Album details	AUS
Tales of Old Grand-Daddy	Released: 11 March 1974; Label: Albert/EMI (EMA-2518); Format: LP	89

=== Singles ===
Title	Year	Album
"Natural Man"	1972	Non-album singles
"Louisiana Lady"	1973	Non-album singles
"Can't Stand the Heat"	1974	Tales of Old Grand-Daddy
