= For Those About to Rock We Salute You =

1981 studio album by AC/DC

For Those About to Rock (We Salute You)

Studio album by AC/DC
- Released: 23 November 1981
- Recorded: July – September 1981
- Studios: Family (Paris); H.I.S. (Paris)
- Genre: Hard rock
- Length: 40:10
- Labels: Albert; Atlantic
- Producer: Robert John "Mutt" Lange

AC/DC chronology
Back in Black (1980)	For Those About to Rock (We Salute You) (1981)	Flick of the Switch (1983)

Singles from For Those About to Rock We Salute You
- 1. "Let's Get It Up" Released: January 1982; 2. "For Those About to Rock (We Salute You)" Released: June 1982

For Those About to Rock (We Salute You) (shortened to For Those About to Rock on its cover) is the eighth studio album by Australian hard rock band AC/DC. It was released on 23 November 1981 in the US and on 27 November 1981 in the UK.

The album is a follow-up to their album Back in Black. It has sold over four million copies in the US. It was AC/DC's first and only number one album in the US until the release of Black Ice in October 2008. In their original 1981 review, Rolling Stone magazine declared it to be their best album. In Australia, the album peaked at number three on the Kent Music Report Albums Chart.

The album, recorded in Paris, was the third and final AC/DC collaboration with producer Robert John "Mutt" Lange. It was re-released in 2003 as part of the AC/DC Remasters series.

== Recording ==
After taking a few months' break following the Back in Black Tour, the band reconvened in Paris for a week of rehearsals in June 1981 for the new album; most, if not all, of the songs had been written by this point. Recording originally began on 6 July 1981 EMI's Pathé Marconi Studios in Paris with Lange producing; however, they decided to abandon the sessions after 10 days as Lange could not get the sounds he wanted. After two weeks of searching for another recording studio, they ended up recording in a rehearsal room, H.I.S. Studio, in Paris by late July using the Mobile One recording truck hired from London.

To add to the recording delays, the band also interrupted sessions to perform at the Monsters of Rock festival at Castle Donington on 22 August; this did not go down well for them, partly due to poor weather and lack of time to prepare. The band were also growing impatient with Lange's perfectionism and relentless tinkering in the studio, which led to them parting ways after the completion of the album.

== Reception ==
Professional ratings
Review scores
Source	Rating
AllMusic	3/5 stars
Blender	3/5 stars
Christgau's Record Guide	C
Collector's Guide to Heavy Metal	8/10
The Encyclopedia of Popular Music	4/5 stars
Metal Storm	8/10
Mojo	3/5 stars
Rolling Stone	4/5 stars
Ultimate Guitar	9.3/10
Uncut	7/10

For Those About to Rock became the first AC/DC album to ever hit number one in the US on the Billboard chart and stayed on the top for three weeks. In the US it has achieved four million sales. In the UK, the album's two singles, "Let's Get It Up" and "For Those About to Rock (We Salute You)", made it to number 13 and number 15, respectively. The album has sold an estimated seven million copies worldwide, making it one of the best-selling AC/DC albums around the world. However, it marked a major drop-off in sales in the United States, only selling four million as the follow-up to the 25× platinum Back in Black. In a 2008 Rolling Stone cover story, David Fricke singled out the title track for praise, noting its "unusual stop-start effect that hooks you just as hard as their usual railroad drive." Robert Christgau stated: "Brian Johnson takes over, defining an anthemic grandiosity more suitable to their precious-metal status than Bon Scott's old-fashioned raunch. Also dumber. 'Let's Get It Up' is a limited sentiment in any case. But I'd appreciate some indication that Johnson knows the difference between his dick and the light tower."

== Track listing ==
All tracks are written by Angus Young, Malcolm Young and Brian Johnson.

Side A
No.	Title	Length
1.	"For Those About to Rock (We Salute You)"	5:43
2.	"Put the Finger on You"	3:25
3.	"Let's Get It Up"	3:53
4.	"Inject the Venom"	3:31
5.	"Snowballed"	3:23

Side B
No.	Title	Length
6.	"Evil Walks"	4:23
7.	"C.O.D."	3:19
8.	"Breaking the Rules"	4:23
9.	"Night of the Long Knives"	3:25
10.	"Spellbound"	4:28
Total length:		40:10

- According to the official AC/DC website, the second track is "Put the Finger on You" while on some versions of the album, the title is shown as "I Put the Finger on You".
- As the song's lyrics read, "C.O.D." stands for "Care Of the Devil".

== Personnel ==
AC/DC

- Brian Johnson – lead vocals
- Angus Young – lead guitar
- Malcolm Young – rhythm guitar, backing vocals
- Cliff Williams – bass guitar, backing vocals
- Phil Rudd – drums

Production

- Robert John "Mutt" Lange – production
- Mark Dearnley – recording engineer
- Dave Thoener – mixing engineer
- Andy Rose, Mark Haliday & Nigel Green – assistant engineers
- Bob Ludwig – mastering at MasteRdisk (1981)
- Ted Jensen – remastering at Sterling Sound (1994)
- George Marino – remastering (2003)
- Al Quaglieri & Mike Fraser – remastering supervision (2003)

== Charts ==
=== Weekly charts ===
Chart (1981–2024)	Peak position
Australian Albums (Kent Music Report)	3
Austrian Albums (Ö3 Austria)	7
Dutch Albums (Album Top 100)	22
Finnish Albums (Suomen virallinen lista)	19
German Albums (Offizielle Top 100)	2
Italian Albums (Musica e dischi)	5
Japanese Albums (Oricon)	100
New Zealand Albums (RMNZ)	6
Norwegian Albums (VG-lista)	6
Spanish Albums (Promusicae)	75
Swedish Albums (Sverigetopplistan)	9
Swiss Albums (Schweizer Hitparade)	26
US Billboard 200	1

=== Year-end charts ===
Chart (1982)	Position
Austrian Albums (Ö3 Austria)	20
German Albums (Offizielle Top 100)	30
US Billboard 200	43

== Certifications ==
Region	Certification	Certified units/sales
Australia (ARIA)	5× Platinum	350,000^{^}
Austria (IFPI Austria)	Gold	25,000^{*}
Canada (Music Canada)	Platinum	100,000^{‡}
Denmark (IFPI Danmark)	Gold	50,000^{^}
France (SNEP)	Platinum	400,000^{*}
Germany (BVMI)	Platinum	500,000^{^}
Italy (FIMI) sales since 2009	Gold	25,000^{‡}
Japan (RIAJ)	Gold	100,000^{^}
Spain (Promusicae)	Gold	50,000^{^}
Switzerland (IFPI Switzerland)	Platinum	50,000^{^}
United Kingdom (BPI)	Gold	100,000^{*}
United States (RIAA)	4× Platinum	4,000,000^{^}
^{*} Sales figures based on certification alone.^{^} Shipments figures based on certification alone.^{‡} Sales+streaming figures based on certification alone.
