= Tales of Old Grand-Daddy =

Studio album by Marcus Hook Roll Band
- Released: 11 March 1974
- Recorded: 12 June 1972; 14 November 1972; July – August 1973
- Studios: EMI (London); EMI (Sydney)
- Genres: Hard rock, Pub rock, Boogie rock, Glam rock
- Length: 37:24
- Label: Albert/EMI
- Producer: Wally Waller

Tales of Old Grand-Daddy is the only studio album by Australian rock band Marcus Hook Roll Band, released in Australia in 11 March 1974. The album is noted for being the recording debut of Angus Young and Malcolm Young, who went on to global fame with AC/DC.

== Overview ==
The group released Tales of Old Grand-Daddy in 11 March 1974, which was originally issued only in Australia on Albert Productions/EMI. Many of the details surrounding Tales of Old Grand-Daddy remain forgotten due to excessive alcohol consumption during the recording sessions. According to George Young, "We all got rotten (drunk) – except Angus, who was too young – and we spent a month in the studio boozing it up every night." The album features rhythm and lead guitar from both Malcolm and Angus Young, although whose parts are whose is a detail forgotten. Tales of Old Grand-Daddy was released in 1979 as Marcus Hook Roll Band with an extra track and new cover art in the United States on Capitol's "green label" budget series (#SN-11991); in the wake of Vanda & Young's Flash and the Pan album. They also released the lead single "Can't Stand the Heat" / "Moonshine Blues" in 1974. Tales of Old Grand-Daddy was re-issued in 1981, titled Full File, with two non-album singles added. A CD version of the album was also re-issued in 1994 through Albert Productions/Sony Music, and again on 2 June 2014, with two unreleased songs added.

== Track listing ==
All tracks are written by Harry Vanda and George Young, except where noted. All song lengths are measured according to Spotify.

Tales of Old Grand-Daddy – standard edition
| No. | Title | Lead vocals | Length |
|---|---|---|---|
| 1. | "Can't Stand the Heat" | Vanda | 3:10 |
| 2. | "Goodbye Jane" | Vanda | 3:34 |
| 3. | "Quick Reaction" | Vanda | 3:02 |
| 4. | "Silver Shoes and Strawberry Wine" | Vanda | 5:48 |
| 5. | "Watch Her Do It Now" | Young | 3:39 |
| 6. | "The People and the Power" | Young | 4:51 |
| 7. | "Red Revolution" | Vanda | 3:10 |
| 8. | "Shot in the Head" | Young | 3:25 |
| 9. | "Ape Man" | Young | 2:50 |
| 10. | "Cry For Me" | Vanda | 3:55 |
| Total length: | | | 37:24 |

Tales of Old Grand-Daddy – 1994 Australian reissue
| No. | Title | Lead vocals | Length |
|---|---|---|---|
| 1. | "Natural Man" | Young | 3:47 |
| 2. | "Louisiana Lady" | Vanda | 3:03 |
| 3. | "Shot in the Head" | Young | 3:25 |
| 4. | "Can't Stand the Heat" | Vanda | 3:10 |
| 5. | "Goodbye Jane" | Vanda | 3:34 |
| 6. | "Quick Reaction" | Vanda | 3:02 |
| 7. | "The People and the Power" | Young | 4:51 |
| 8. | "Red Revolution" | Vanda | 3:10 |
| 9. | "Cry For Me" | Vanda | 3:55 |
| 10. | "Silver Shoes and Strawberry Wine" | Vanda | 5:48 |
| 11. | "Watch Her Do It Now" | Young | 3:39 |
| 12. | "Ape Man" | Young | 2:50 |
| Total length: | | | 44:14 |

Tales of Old Grand-Daddy – 2014 reissue
| No. | Title | Writer(s) | Lead vocals | Length |
|---|---|---|---|---|
| 11. | "One of These Days" | | Vanda | 4:37 |
| 12. | "Natural Man" | | Young | 3:47 |
| 13. | "Moonshine Blues" | Wally Waller | Vanda | 3:14 |
| 14. | "Louisiana Lady" | | Vanda | 3:03 |
| 15. | "Ride Baby Ride" | | Young | 3:07 |
| Total length: | | | | 55:12 |

== Personnel ==
Credits adapted from the liner notes.

Locations

- EMI Studios, London – recording, (Note: Recorded on 12 June and 14 November 1972.) mixing
- EMI Studios, Sydney – recording (Note: Recorded between July – August 1973.)

Marcus Hook Roll Band

- Harry Vanda – lead guitar, lead vocals (tracks 1–4, 7, 10 – 13, 14 on 2014 reissue); backing vocals
- George Young – lead vocals, (tracks 5, 6, 8, 9 – 11, 12, 15 on 2014 reissue); backing vocals, rhythm guitar, piano, bass guitar
- Malcolm Young – guitar (Sydney)
- Angus Young – guitar (Sydney)
- Alex Young – saxophone (London)
- Howard Casey – saxophone (London)
- Ian Campbell – bass guitar (London)
- John Proud – drums (Sydney)
- Freddie Smith – drums (London)
- Wally Waller – electric piano

Production

- Wally Waller – writing (track 13 on 2014 reissue), producing
- Harry Vanda – writing
- George Young – writing

== Charts ==
| Chart (1975) | Peak position |
|---|---|
| Australia (Kent Music Report) | 89 |
