= Angus Young =

Australian musician; lead guitarist of AC/DC (born 1955)

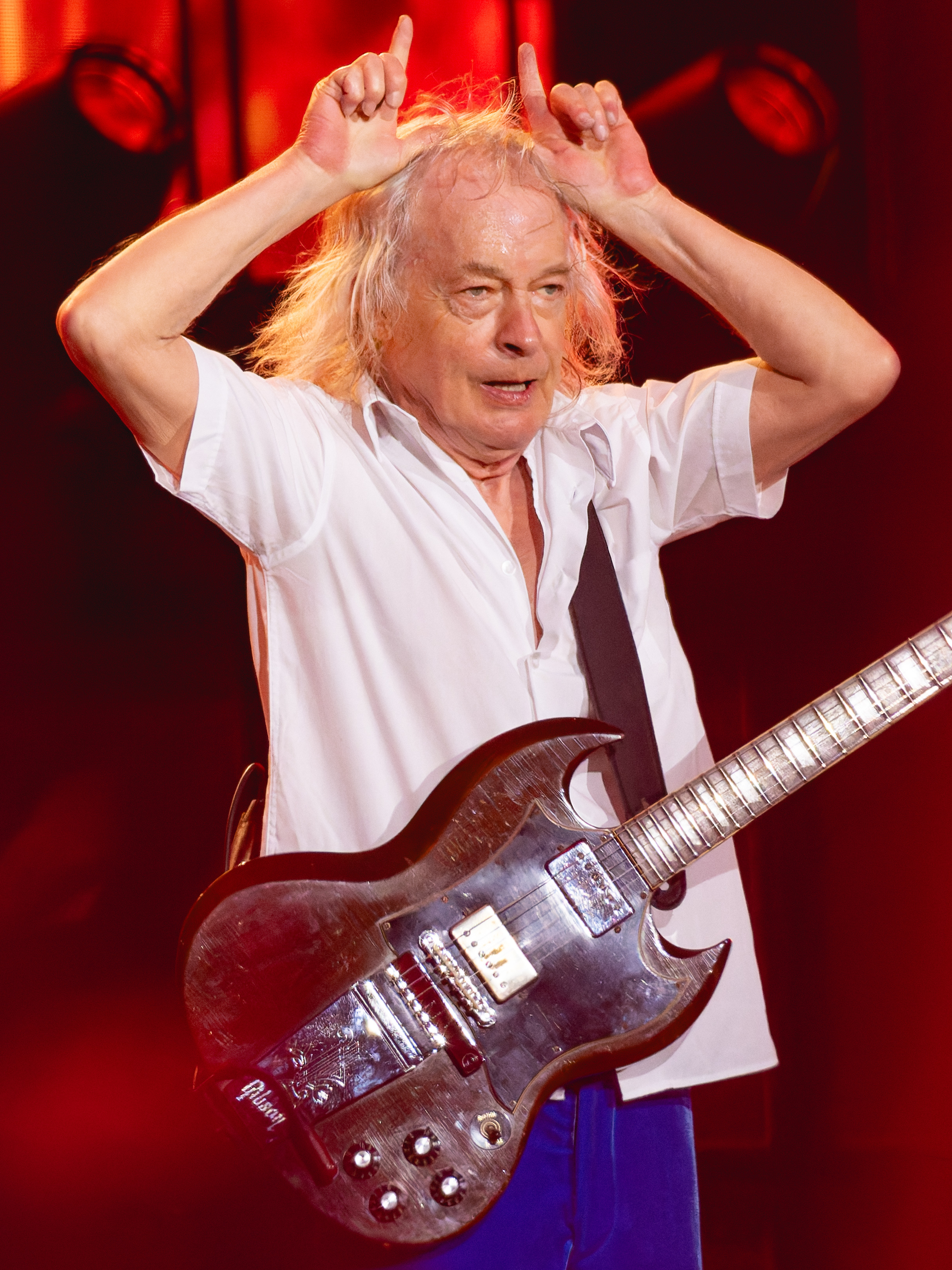
- Young performing in 2024

Background information
- Born: Angus McKinnon Young; 31 March 1955 (age 71); Glasgow, Scotland
- Origin: Sydney, New South Wales, Australia
- Genres: Hard rock; blues rock; rock and roll
- Occupations: Musician; songwriter; producer
- Instrument: Guitar
- Years active: 1970–present
- Labels: EMI; Epic; Atlantic; Albert; Columbia
- Member of: AC/DC
- Formerly of: Marcus Hook Roll Band
- Spouse: Ellen van Lochem (m. 1980)
- Website: acdc.com

Angus McKinnon Young (born 31 March 1955) is an Australian musician, best known as the co-founder, lead guitarist, songwriter, and the only continuous member of the hard rock band AC/DC. He is known for his energetic performances, school uniform-style stage outfits, and his own version of Chuck Berry's duckwalk. Young was ranked 38th in the 2023 edition of Rolling Stone's 250 greatest guitarists of all time list. In 2003, Young was inducted into the Rock and Roll Hall of Fame as a member of AC/DC.

== Early life ==
Angus McKinnon Young was born on 31 March 1955 in Glasgow, Scotland. In the 1950s, Young's father, William Young (1911–1985), his mother, Margaret (1913–1988; maiden name also Young), and his elder seven siblings lived at 6 Skerryvore Road in the Cranhill district of Glasgow in Scotland. Cranhill was a tough, working-class suburb with high unemployment.

Prior to moving to Cranhill, William worked first as a wheel boy in a rope works and then as a machine/saw operator in an asbestos cement business. In 1940, William joined the Royal Air Force, serving in World War II as a flight engine mechanic. After the war, William worked as a yard man for a builder and then as a postman. Margaret was a housewife.

Young spent the first seven years of his life in Scotland. His siblings were Stephen Crawford, Margaret, John, Alexander, William, George and Malcolm.

Music was part of family life. Stephen played the piano accordion and the piano, Young's sister Margaret was passionate about music, John played the guitar, Alexander was an accomplished singer, bass guitarist and saxophonist who in the early 1960s left for a career in music in Europe, and George and Malcolm eventually became founding members of the Easybeats and AC/DC respectively. Stephen was the father of Stevie Young who in later years took over from Malcolm in AC/DC.

Young himself took up the guitar at the age of five or six, receiving one lesson from Alexander, after which he was self-taught. Young also learned how to fight on Cranhill's tough streets, and, on one occasion, was struck by a car.

Prompted by the winter of 1962–1963, the worst winter on record in Scotland, and TV advertisements offering assisted travel for families to emigrate to Australia, the Youngs flew from Scotland to Sydney, Australia, in late June 1963, when Young was eight years old. John migrated to Australia separately from his parents and siblings, while Alexander was the only child to remain in the UK.

Initially staying at Villawood Migrant Hostel (a site later developed as Villawood Immigration Detention Centre) in Nissen huts, brother George met and became friends with another migrant, Harry Vanda, a relationship that grew into their professional careers in music.

Young's family moved into a semi-detached house at 4 Burleigh Street in the Sydney suburb of Burwood. The house was demolished in December 2024, despite being on the National Trust List of Historic Homes since 2013. Young attended Burwood Public School from 1960 to 1966 and in 1967, attended Ashfield Boys High School, dropping out at age 15. While at high school, Young enjoyed only the art classes. He practised the guitar in his bedroom after school.

After high school, Young worked at various jobs, including night shifts at a butcher shop. Then he became an apprentice printer. For one week, a soft porn magazine called Ribald moved into the print shop where Young worked. Young set some type for that magazine, but, despite some claims, was never its employee.

Young first started playing on a banjo, re-strung with six strings. Young's first guitar was a cheap acoustic model purchased second-hand by his mother. After high school, and with a pay packet, Young bought his first Gibson SG second-hand around 1970 from a music shop just down the street from his home: "I got out and got a Gibson SG that I played until it got wood rot because so much sweat and water got into it. The whole neck warped. I bought it second-hand; it was about a '67. It had a real thin neck, really slim, like a Custom neck. It was dark brown."

== Career ==
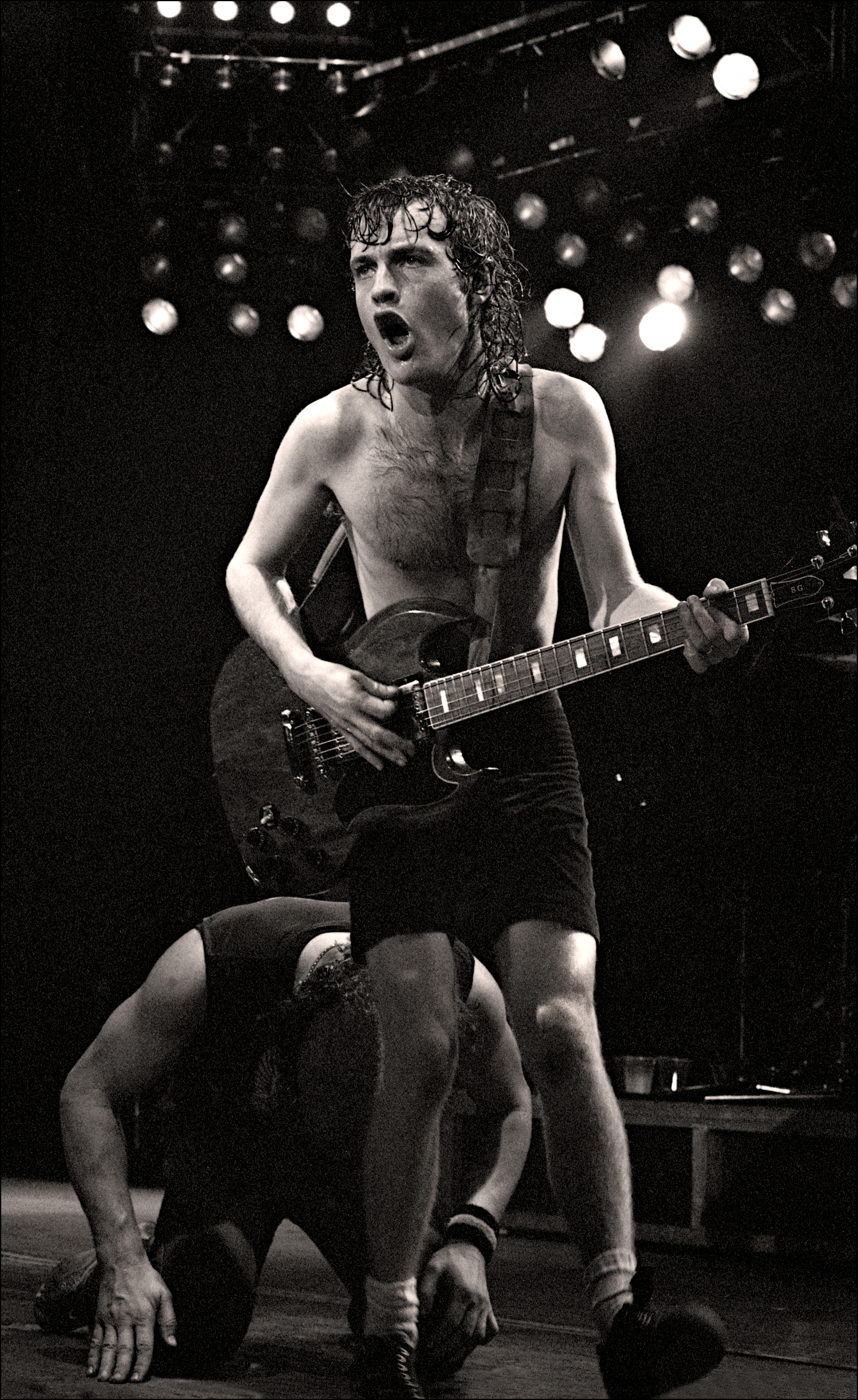
Young live with AC/DC in 1982 at the Manchester Apollo

Both Angus and Malcolm were in a band with George and his music partner Harry Vanda called Marcus Hook Roll Band. The project released an album in Australia called Tales of Old Grand Daddy.

Prior to forming AC/DC, Angus Young played in a local group called Kantuckee. Kantuckee's line-up included Bob McGlynn (vocals), Angus Young (guitar), Jon Stevens (bass) and Trevor James (drums). The band split and was later called Tantrum with the following line up: Mark Sneddon (vocals-guitar), Angus Young (guitar), Jon Stevens (bass) and Trevor James (drums).

Young was 18 when he and Malcolm formed AC/DC in 1973. Young was on lead guitar, Malcolm on rhythm guitar, Colin Burgess on drums, Larry Van Kriedt on bass guitar and Dave Evans on vocals. The band had a recording contract with Albert Productions; it had also produced the work of the Easybeats.

"Can I Sit Next To You Girl", the band's first single, was later re-recorded with Bon Scott as their vocalist. They decided upon the name AC/DC, suggested by their sister Margaret, who saw the letters "AC/DC" on the back of her sewing machine.

Young tried a number of stage costumes, such as Spider-Man, Zorro, a gorilla, and a parody of Superman named Super-Ang, before settling on his signature schoolboy look at the suggestion of his sister. To match this image, the press and public were told that Young was born in 1959, not 1955. The original uniform was created by his sister Margaret, and, when it fell apart from wear and tear, he used his uniform from Ashfield Boys High School in Sydney.

AC/DC released their debut album, High Voltage, exclusively in Australia on 17 February 1975, along with a single "Baby, Please Don't Go" / "Love Song". Over the next three years, AC/DC cemented themselves as a popular hard rock act, especially in Australia, with the follow-up albums T.N.T., Dirty Deeds Done Dirt Cheap, Let There Be Rock and Powerage. All their albums until this point were produced by Young's brother George in partnership with Harry Vanda. Their 1979 studio album, Highway to Hell, became their best-selling at the time and launched them to new heights of fame.

Months after this, Scott died from alcohol poisoning. Questions were raised as to whether the band could continue without him. Young and his other bandmates soon decided they should finish the work they had begun for their new album, so they recruited ex-Geordie singer Brian Johnson to replace Scott. Five months later, Back in Black was released as a tribute to Scott. It quickly became a huge success, far outselling any of their previous albums, and going on to reach 27x multi-platinum in the US alone, and selling 50 million copies, the second-highest-selling album worldwide, behind only Michael Jackson's Thriller. AC/DC's next album, For Those About to Rock We Salute You, cemented their position as the most popular hard rock act of the time.

AC/DC's popularity declined with their next three albums, Flick of the Switch, Fly on the Wall and Blow Up Your Video. AC/DC looked as though they had reached their peak early in the 1980s and by the end of the decade were in decline. Malcolm Young missed the majority of the band's 1988 Blow Up Your Video World Tour to address his drinking problem. He eventually became sober and returned to the band. During his absence, he was replaced by his nephew, Stevie Young.

The band's 1990 studio album, The Razors Edge, brought them back into the spotlight, reaching 5x multi-platinum in the US alone and selling between 10 and 12 million copies worldwide. Over the next 10 years, AC/DC released two other studio albums, Ballbreaker and Stiff Upper Lip, which confirmed their renewed popularity and success. After a lengthy eight-year hiatus, AC/DC returned with a new studio album, Black Ice, in 2008. Black Ice debuted at number 1 in 29 countries and was certified multi-platinum in 14 of those, becoming one of their most successful albums worldwide, and was followed by a hugely successful world tour. In 2010, AC/DC released an album of songs used for the Iron Man 2 soundtrack they had put together; this reached number one in many countries around the world, including the UK, and number four in the US. Malcolm Young confirmed in 2011 that AC/DC were working on a 16th studio album.

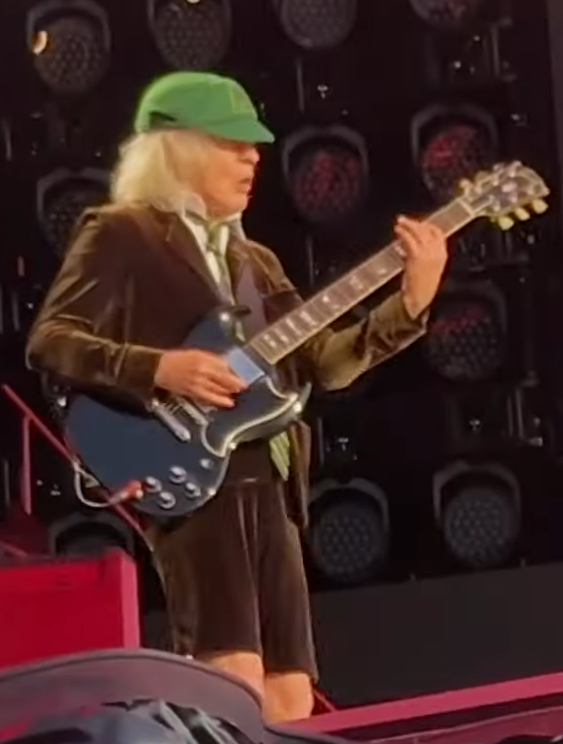
Young performing in Reggio Emilia in 2024

In April 2014 Malcolm was forced to leave the band due to ill health, leaving Young the sole continuous founding member left in the band. In May it was revealed that Stevie Young, Malcolm and Young's nephew, would stand in for his uncle to record AC/DC's latest record. In September, Malcolm officially retired, while Stevie was made AC/DC's official full-time rhythm guitarist. AC/DC released Rock or Bust in the fall of 2014. In March 2016, after the departure of both Malcolm Young and drummer Phil Rudd, AC/DC was set back with yet another departure: long-time lead singer Brian Johnson was ordered by doctors to stop performing or face total hearing loss. Young, determined to finish what the band started, recruited Guns N' Roses singer Axl Rose to stand in for Johnson for the remainder of the Rock or Bust World Tour. On 30 September 2020, the band's official Twitter account announced the pending release of a new album, Power Up, with the lineup of Angus Young, Stevie Young, Brian Johnson, Cliff Williams and Phil Rudd.

In 2003, AC/DC were inducted into the Rock and Roll Hall of Fame, and the following year they were ranked number 72 on Rolling Stone's list of the "100 Greatest Artists of All Time". VH1 ranked them number 23 on their list of the "100 greatest artists of all time" and number 4 in their list of the "100 greatest artists of hard rock".

== Personal life ==
Young has been married to Ellen van Lochem, who is Dutch, since 1980; they have no children. They own homes in Australia, the UK, and the Netherlands.

Although a heavy smoker, Young is a teetotaler and has been his entire life.

On 24 August 2006, Young received Kerrang! magazine's Legend Award from the editor, Paul Brannigan, who called AC/DC "one of the most important and influential rock bands in history". On 16 May 2012, he was named the "Best Australian Guitarist of All Time" in a poll conducted by Australian Guitar Magazine.

== Equipment ==
=== Guitars ===
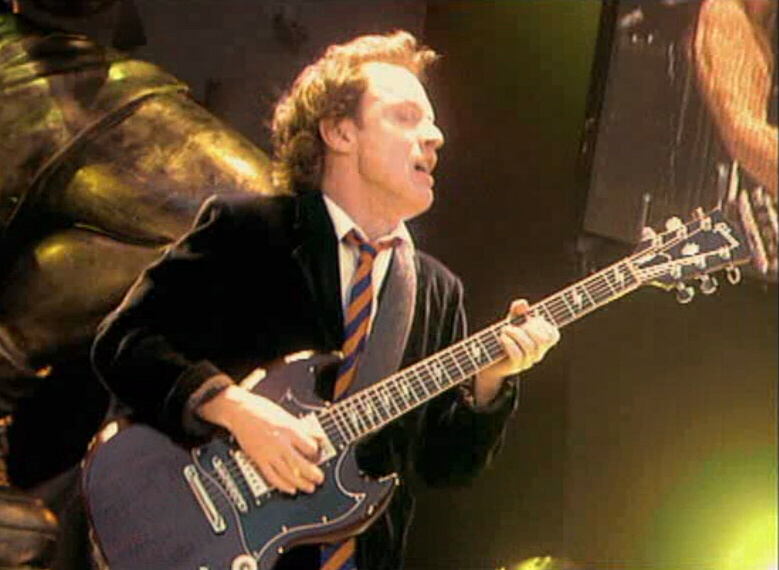
Young performing live in 2001 on the Stiff Upper Lip tour in Germany

Young has used Gibson SGs in various forms throughout his career. His original, and the basis for his current signature model, was a 1969–1971 SG Standard. One of his original SGs was given a lightning-bolt fingerboard during a repair by luthier John Diggins, and remained his most prominent studio guitar. His primary stage guitar is a 1967 ebony SG Standard. Diggins made at least one more SG for Young under his own "Jaydee" brand name.

At least two of his SGs, whether modified Gibson product or ground-up construction, circa 1977 and the Paris Let There Be Rock tapings featured on-board wireless communication to his amplifiers, the circuitry installed in a cavity routed into the back of the body. This practice was discontinued due to the potential for electrical shorts due to sweat, and at least one of these guitars was repaired and used for the Rock or Bust tour.

Gibson made a custom SG for Young with lightning bolt inlays to replace the Jaydee SG. Young's '69–'71 SG has T Top humbucking pick-ups. Another 1964 SG, which he used on the recording of Ballbreaker, has patent # pick-ups. All of these are vintage-output Alnico II or V pick-ups with matched coils typically reading 7.5k–7.8k DCR. Beginning in 2009, Young started fitting Seymour Duncan humbuckers to all of his touring guitars. He uses Ernie Ball Super Slinky guitar strings (.009-.042) and Fender "Extra Heavy" picks.

=== Angus Young SG ===
Young and Gibson Guitar Corporation have collaborated to make the Angus Young SG. It features a pick-up designed by Young himself, the Angus Young Signature Humbucker, in the bridge position, and a '57 Classic Humbucker in the neck. The neck has "lightning bolt" inlays.

=== Amplifiers ===
Young mainly uses Marshall 1959 100-watt Super Lead Plexi heads and model 1960 AX and BX 4x12 cabinets with Celestion G12-65 speakers. Later amplifiers included Marshall JMP 2203 and most recently, Wizard Amplifiers. Early wireless systems, the Schaffer-Vega Diversity System that he began using in 1977, was also used as a compressor and a booster in his signal to "fatten up" his tone. Ever since adding it to his rig, it was used on several albums in the studio for chosen rhythm guitar tracks and all lead guitar tracks. Beginning with Rock or Bust, due to the discontinuation of the Schaffer system, Young began using a replica of the unit's preamp with a commercial wireless unit from Shure.

== Influences ==
Young has stated that he first began playing guitar when he was "little, teeny. I would sort of dabble around five or six years old. That's when I started hearing Little Richard."

In an interview with The Guitar Show, Young noted his influences include his brother Malcolm, Chuck Berry, Freddie King and Muddy Waters, while playing licks relating to Jimi Hendrix, Pete Townshend, John Lee Hooker and the Kinks' "You Really Got Me".

Young has indicated that he was also influenced by Keith Richards, as well as Chuck Berry's performing style, including his banter with audiences and duck walk. When the band covered Chuck Berry songs in their early years, audiences would recognise the song, while noting their renditions were very different from the source material.

== Style ==
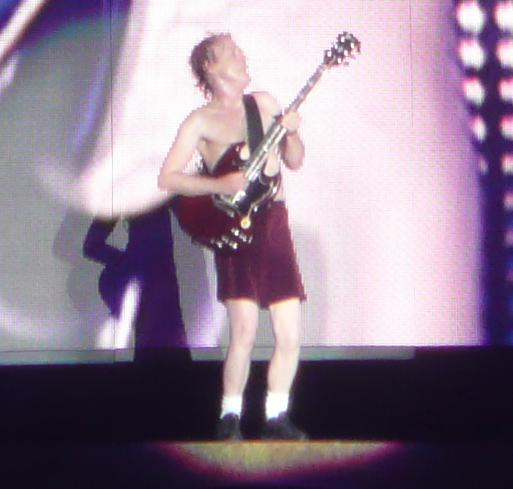
Young during a performance of "Let There Be Rock"

Young's playing style is influenced by straight blues playing in both the minor and major pentatonic twelve bar blues–type progressions. In AC/DC's earlier recordings, power chords can be heard in songs such as "T.N.T." and "It's a Long Way to the Top (If You Wanna Rock 'n' Roll)". He also utilises touches of Scottish folk in his playing, and pull-off arpeggios (pull-offs played one-handed) are a popular trick, appearing in songs such as "Who Made Who", "Dirty Deeds Done Dirt Cheap", "Sin City", and live renditions of "Let There Be Rock". In 1976, the band recorded an instrumental arrangement of the Scottish traditional song "Loch Lomond", retitled "Fling Thing", which has appeared in their stage act over the years. The title refers to the Highland Fling. Young occasionally provides backing vocals along with Malcolm on songs such as "T.N.T." and "Dirty Deeds Done Dirt Cheap".

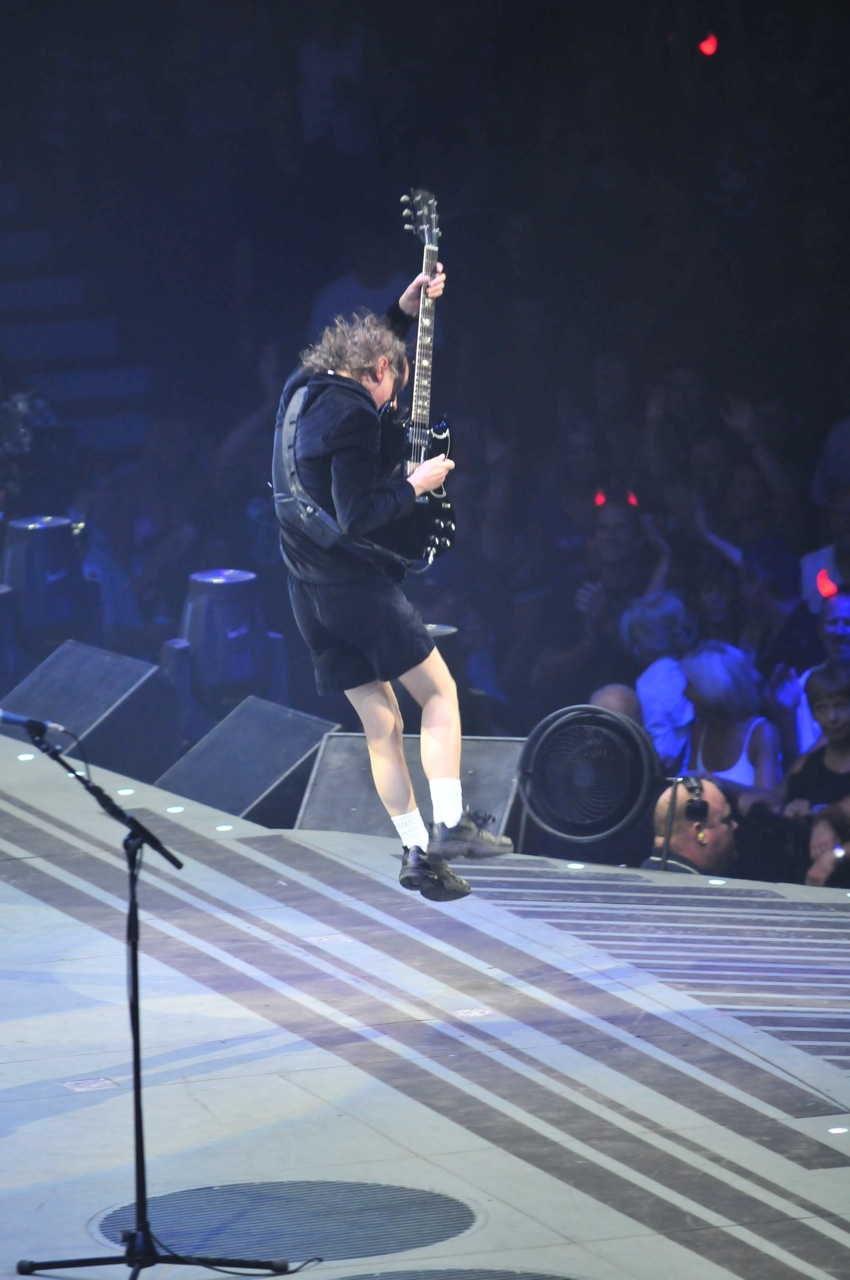
Young onstage in 2009

Young is famous for his wild onstage antics, such as intense jumps and running back and forth across the stage. Once, he would clamber onto Bon Scott's or Brian Johnson's shoulders during concerts and they would make their way through the audience with smoke streaming from a satchel on Young's back, while he played an extended improvised guitar solo, usually during the song "Rocker" with Scott or "Let There Be Rock" with Johnson. He frequently does his own version of Chuck Berry's duck walk, as well as a "spasm" during which he throws himself to the ground, kicking, shaking and spinning in circles while playing the guitar. In earlier years he might remove his jacket and shirt mid-song as a form of 'striptease' to the confused bemusement of the crowd.

Young was advised by older brother George that, if he ever tripped over his guitar cable, to keep playing and make it look like part of the act. Young also included a sort of striptease as part of a mid-show ritual, during which he slowly took off his schoolboy outfit, running across the stage to elicit cheers from the audience, culminating in a "mooning" gesture to expose his underwear, generally chosen with the colours of the local flag or occasionally offering a brief glimpse of his bare buttocks. He would then pull up his shorts, grab his guitar and play the remainder of the show topless. According to AC/DC video director David Mallet, although Young performs many of his trademark feats sometimes from a series of platforms, risers and ramps, he suffers from a fear of heights. This was discovered when Mallet chose to have Young lowered from a second-storey balcony onto a stage floor by wires for the video for "Who Made Who".

== Discography ==
=== Marcus Hook Roll Band ===
- Tales of Old Grand Daddy (1973 Australia, 1978 America, 2014 international)

== Awards and nominations ==
=== APRA Awards ===
The APRA Awards are presented annually from 1982 by the Australasian Performing Right Association (APRA), "honouring composers and songwriters". They commenced in 1982.

Year	Nominee / work	Award	Result
1995	"Big Gun" – Angus Young, Malcolm Young	Most Played Australian Work Overseas	Won
2001	"It's a Long Way to the Top (If You Wanna Rock 'n' Roll)" – Bon Scott, Angus Young, Malcolm Young	Ten Best Australian Songs	Ninth
2006	"Highway to Hell" – Bon Scott, Angus Young, Malcolm Young	Most Played Australian Work Overseas	Nominated
2007	"Highway to Hell" – Bon Scott, Angus Young, Malcolm Young	Most Played Australian Work Overseas	Nominated
2009	"Highway to Hell" – Bon Scott, Angus Young, Malcolm Young	Most Played Australian Work Overseas	Won
2010	"Rock 'n' Roll Train" – Angus Young, Malcolm Young	Most Played Australian Work Overseas	Won
2010	Angus Young, Malcolm Young	Songwriters of the Year	Won
2011	"Highway to Hell" – Bon Scott, Angus Young, Malcolm Young	Most Played Australian Work Overseas	Won
2015	"Play Ball" – Angus Young, Malcolm Young	Song of the Year	Shortlisted
2015	"Rock or Bust" – Angus Young, Malcolm Young	Song of the Year	Shortlisted
2022	"Shot in the Dark"	Most Performed Rock Work	Won
2022	"Realize" – Angus Young, Malcolm Young	Song of the Year	Shortlisted
