= Clipped (video) =

Video by AC/DC
- Released: 1 July 1991
- Genre: Hard rock

Clipped is a video featuring five tracks by the Australian hard rock band AC/DC. First released in 1991, it contained three tracks from The Razors Edge and two from Blow Up Your Video.

In 2002 a DVD version was released which also included videos for the songs "Big Gun" (from the Last Action Hero soundtrack) and "Hard as a Rock" (from Ballbreaker).

The photograph on the cover was first used in 1990 for the single "Are You Ready".

== Track listing ==
1. "Thunderstruck"
2. "Moneytalks"
3. "Are You Ready"
4. "Heatseeker"
5. "That's the Way I Wanna Rock 'n' Roll"
- All songs written by Young, Young, except "Heatseeker" and "That's the Way I Wanna Rock 'n' Roll", by Young, Johnson, Young.

== Personnel ==
- Brian Johnson - lead vocals
- Angus Young - lead guitar
- Malcolm Young - rhythm guitar, backing vocals
- Cliff Williams - bass guitar, backing vocals
- Chris Slade - drums, percussion
- Simon Wright - drums on "Heatseeker" and "That's the Way I Wanna Rock 'n' Roll"
- Phil Rudd - drums on "Hard as a Rock" on DVD
