= List of awards and nominations received by AC/DC =

AC/DC awards and nominations
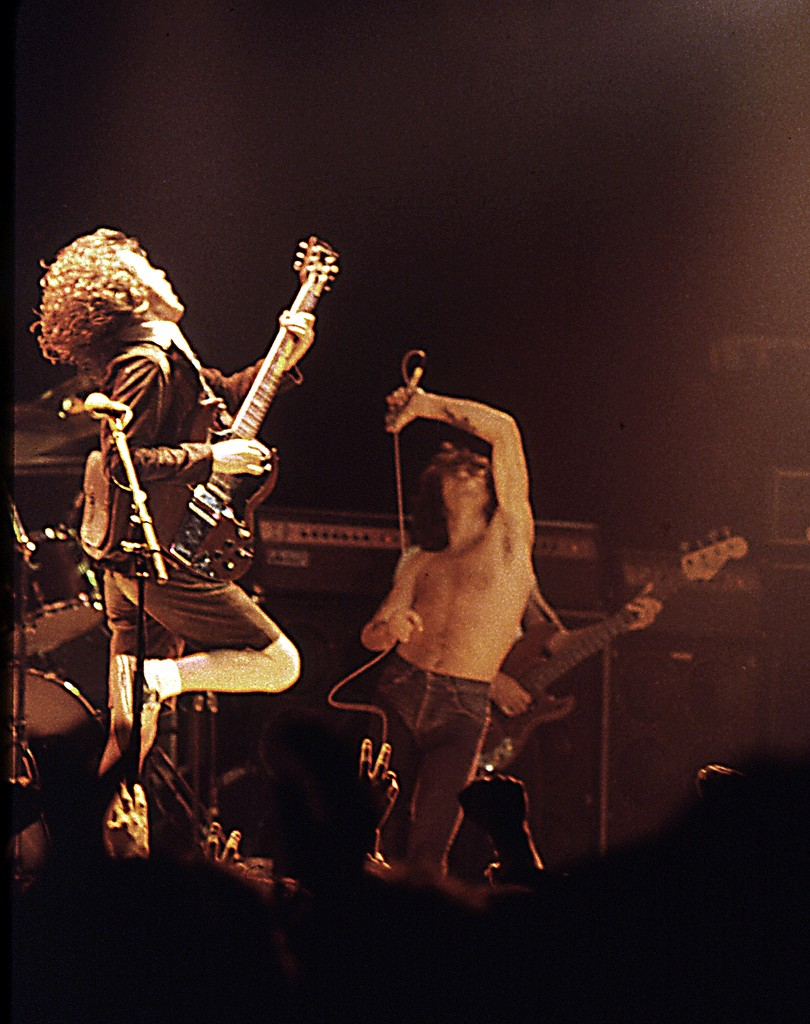
- Former vocalist Bon Scott (centre) pictured with guitarist Angus Young (left) and bass guitarist Cliff Williams (back); performing in Belfast in 1979
Awards and nominations
Award	Wins	Nominations
American Music Awards	0	2
APRA Awards (Australia)	8	10
ARIA Music Awards	3	8
Billboard Music Awards	0	3
Brit Awards	0	2
Classic Rock Roll of Honour Awards	4	5
Grammy Awards	1	10
iHeartRadio Music Awards	1	3
Juno Awards	0	1
Metal Storm Awards	1	3
MTV Video Music Awards	0	1
Rock on Request Awards	0	1
UK Music Video Awards	0	2

Totals (Note: Certain award groups do not simply award one winner. They acknowledge several different recipients, have runners-up, and have third place. Since this is a specific recognition and is different from losing an award, runner-up mentions are considered wins in this award tally. For simplification and to avoid errors, each award in this list has been presumed to have had a prior nomination.)
- Wins: 18
- Nominations: 51

AC/DC are an Australian rock band formed in Sydney in November 1973 by brothers Angus and Malcolm Young. Although the band are variously described as hard rock, blues rock; and heavy metal, its members have referred to themselves as "a rock and roll band, nothing more, nothing less". AC/DC underwent several line-up changes before releasing their first album, High Voltage, in 1975. Membership subsequently stabilised after the release of Let There Be Rock (1977), with the Young brothers, Phil Rudd on drums, Cliff Williams on bass guitar and Bon Scott on lead vocals. Seven months after the release of Highway to Hell (1979), Scott died of alcohol poisoning, and was replaced by English singer Brian Johnson, with whom AC/DC released their second best-selling album, Back in Black.

The band's next album, For Those About to Rock We Salute You, was also highly successful and was their first album to reach number one in the Billboard 200. Rudd left AC/DC and was replaced by Simon Wright, who was himself replaced by Chris Slade six years later. AC/DC experienced a commercial resurgence in the early 1990s with the release of The Razors Edge (1990); it was their only record to feature Slade, as Rudd returned in 1994 and has since recorded five more albums with the band, starting with Ballbreaker (1995). Their fifteenth studio album, Black Ice was the second-highest-selling record of 2008. Malcolm retired in 2014 due to early-onset dementia and was replaced by the Young brothers' nephew Stevie Young, who debuted on the album Rock or Bust; Malcolm died three years later. Slade was replaced by Rudd on the Rock or Bust World Tour, due to legal troubles against Rudd. In 2016, Axl Rose replaced Johnson for the rest of the tour due to hearing loss, and Williams retires at the end of the tour. The band's seventeenth studio album Power Up was released on 13 November 2020.

In 1982, AC/DC's first ever nomination at an award show was from the American Music Awards for Favorite Pop/Rock Band/Duo/Group. The group received several nominations from the Grammy Awards, including Best Hard Rock/Metal Performance – Vocal or Instrumental for Blow Up Your Video in 1989, Best Hard Rock Performance for one album and three songs in different years: The Razors Edge in 1991, "Moneytalks" in 1992, the live version of "Highway To Hell" in 1994 and "War Machine" in 2010, Best Rock Performance by a Duo or Group with Vocal for 'Rock 'n' Roll Train" in 2009, Best Rock Album for two albums in different years: Black Ice in 2010 and Power Up in 2022, and Best Rock Song and Music Video for "Shot in the Dark" in 2022. The band also received a nomination for Best Heavy Metal/Hard Rock Video for "Thunderstruck" in 1991 from the MTV Video Music Awards. In 2009, AC/DC received four nominations for their 2008 album Black Ice in the ARIA Music Awards which included Best Rock Album, Highest Selling Album, Best Group and Best Album. They won the awards for Best Rock Album and Highest Selling Album. Overall, AC/DC have received 51 nominations and has won 18 awards.

== Awards and nominations ==
List of awards and nominations, showing award, year, recipient(s), category and result
Award	Year (Note: Indicates the year of ceremony. Each year is linked to the article about the awards held that year, wherever possible.)	Recipient(s)	Category	Result	Ref.
American Music Awards	1982	AC/DC	Favorite Pop/Rock Band/Duo/Group	Nominated	
American Music Awards	2010	Iron Man 2	Top Soundtrack	Nominated	
APRA Awards	1982	"Highway to Hell" (Angus Young, Bon Scott, Malcolm Young)	Gold Award	Won	
APRA Awards	1995	"Big Gun"	Most Played Australian Work Overseas	Won	
APRA Awards	2003	Angus Young, Malcolm Young and Bon Scott (posthumously)	Ted Albert Award for Outstanding Services to Australian Music	Won	
APRA Awards	2006	"Highway to Hell"	Most Played Australian Work Overseas	Nominated	
APRA Awards	2007	"Highway to Hell"	Most Played Australian Work Overseas	Nominated	
APRA Awards	2009	"Highway to Hell"	Most Played Australian Work Overseas	Won	
APRA Awards	2010	"Rock 'n' Roll Train"	Most Played Australian Work Overseas	Won	
APRA Awards	2010	Angus Young, Malcolm Young	Songwriters of the Year	Won	
APRA Awards	2011	"Highway to Hell"	Most Played Australian Work Overseas	Won	
APRA Awards	2022	"Shot in the Dark"	Most Performed Rock Work	Won	
ARIA Music Awards	2009	AC/DC	Best Group	Nominated	
ARIA Music Awards	2009	Black Ice	Album of the Year	Nominated	
ARIA Music Awards	2009	Black Ice	Best Rock Album	Won	
ARIA Music Awards	2009	Black Ice	Highest Selling Album	Won	
ARIA Music Awards	2011	Live at River Plate	Best Music DVD	Won	
ARIA Music Awards	2015	AC/DC	Best Group	Nominated	
ARIA Music Awards	2021	AC/DC	Best Group	Nominated	
ARIA Music Awards	2021	Power Up	Best Rock Album	Nominated	
Billboard Music Awards	2021	AC/DC	Top Duo/Group	Nominated	
Billboard Music Awards	2021	AC/DC	Top Rock Artist	Nominated	
Billboard Music Awards	2021	Power Up	Top Rock Album	Nominated	
Brit Awards	2009	Black Ice	International Album	Nominated	
Brit Awards	2009	AC/DC	International Group	Nominated	
Classic Rock Roll of Honour Awards	2008	Plug Me In	DVD of the Year	Won	
Classic Rock Roll of Honour Awards	2009	Black Ice	Album of the Year	Won	
Classic Rock Roll of Honour Awards	2010	AC/DC	Band of the Year	Won	
Classic Rock Roll of Honour Awards	2015	Rock or Bust	Album of the Year	Nominated	
Classic Rock Roll of Honour Awards	2015	AC/DC	Band of the Year	Won	
Grammy Awards	1989	Blow Up Your Video	Best Hard Rock/Metal Performance Vocal or Instrumental	Nominated	
Grammy Awards	1991	The Razors Edge	Best Hard Rock Performance	Nominated	
Grammy Awards	1992	"Moneytalks"	Best Hard Rock Performance	Nominated	
Grammy Awards	1994	"Highway to Hell" (live)	Best Hard Rock Performance	Nominated	
Grammy Awards	2009	"Rock 'n' Roll Train"	Best Rock Performance by a Duo or Group with Vocal	Nominated	
Grammy Awards	2010	"War Machine"	Best Hard Rock Performance	Won	
Grammy Awards	2010	Black Ice	Best Rock Album	Nominated	
Grammy Awards	2022	Power Up	Best Rock Album	Nominated	
Grammy Awards	2022	"Shot in the Dark"	Best Rock Performance	Nominated	
Grammy Awards	2022	"Shot in the Dark"	Best Music Video	Nominated	
Helpmann Awards	2010	Black Ice World Tour	Best International Contemporary Music Concert	Nominated	
iHeartRadio Music Awards	2021	Power Up	Rock Album of the Year	Won	
iHeartRadio Music Awards	2021	AC/DC	Rock Artist of the Year	Nominated	
iHeartRadio Music Awards	2021	"Shot in the Dark"	Rock Song of the Year	Nominated	
Juno Awards	2009	Black Ice	International Album of the Year	Nominated	
Metal Storm Awards	2008	Black Ice	Best Hard Rock Album	Won	
Metal Storm Awards	2014	Rock or Bust	Best Hard Rock Album	Nominated	
Metal Storm Awards	2020	Power Up	Best Hard Rock Album	Won	
MTV Video Music Awards	1991	"Thunderstruck"	Best Heavy Metal/Hard Rock Video	Nominated	
Rock on Request Awards	2008	AC/DC	Best Reunion	Won	
UK Music Video Awards	2009	Black Ice	Best Music Ad	Nominated	
UK Music Video Awards	2009	AC/DC Rocks the Office	Innovation Award	Nominated	

== Other honours ==
=== World records ===
List of world records, showing publication, year, recipient, description and status
Publication	Year	Recipient	Description	Status	Ref.
Guinness World Records	2008	AC/DC	Most Albums on the US Pop Catalogue Album Chart	Holding	
Guinness World Records	2013	Back in Black	Best-Selling Album by an Australian Group (Note: At the time this award was published, the band was awarded 22× Platinum status by the Recording Industry Association of America (RIAA).)	Holding	

=== Listicles ===
List of listicles, showing publisher, year, description and rank
Publisher	Year	Description	Rank	Ref.
Forbes	2009	The Celebrity 100	47	
Forbes	2010	The Celebrity 100	38	
Forbes	2016	The Celebrity 100	17	
MTV	2006	Greatest Heavy Metal Bands of All Time	23	
Rolling Stone	2010	100 Greatest Artists	72	
VH1	2000	100 Greatest Artists of Hard Rock	4	
VH1	2010	100 Greatest Artists of All Time	23	

=== Hall of fame inductions ===
Name of the organisation, year presented and the title of honour
Organisation	Year	Honour	Ref.
ARIA Hall of Fame	1988	Inducted	
Grammy Hall of Fame	2013	Back in Black – inducted	
Music Victoria Awards Hall of Fame	2015	Inducted	
Rock and Roll Hall of Fame	2003	Inducted	
