= List of Rock Band track packs =

Rock Band Track Packs (called Song Packs in Europe and Australia) are a series of supplemental media discs for the Rock Band series of music video games. The packs are developed by Harmonix and Demiurge Studios (earlier packs were developed with Pi Studios), and distributed by MTV Games and Electronic Arts. The track packs are fully functional standalone games and do not require separate Rock Band titles to play; however, on consoles that support downloadable content, the songs from these packs can be integrated with other Rock Band titles. The initial purpose of the track packs was to allow users of systems without support for downloadable content (PlayStation 2 and originally Wii) to be able to play some of the downloadable tracks. With the exception of the AC/DC pack, all songs in each track pack are available as downloadable content in online stores.

== Rock Band Track Pack Vol. 1 ==
Rock Band Track Pack Vol. 1
- Developers: Harmonix, Pi Studios
- Publisher: MTV Games
- Series: Rock Band
- Platforms: PlayStation 2, Wii
- Release: NA: July 15, 2008; PAL: December 2008
- Genre: Music
- Modes: Single player, multiplayer

Rock Band Track Pack Vol. 1 (Rock Band Song Pack 1) was released for the Wii and PlayStation 2 on July 15, 2008. The addition was announced on May 5, 2008. This disc contains 20 songs previously released as downloadable content for the PlayStation 3 and Xbox 360 . As there are only 20 songs, all tracks have been re-arranged into "Stages" instead of Tiers, with four "Stages" in total.

The following songs are featured on this track pack:

Song title	Artist	Decade	Genre
"All the Small Things"	Blink-182	1990s	Punk
"Buddy Holly"	Weezer	1990s	Alternative
"Calling Dr. Love"	Kiss	1970s	Classic Rock
"Crushcrushcrush"	Paramore	2000s	Pop/Rock
"Die, All Right!"	The Hives	2000s	Punk
"Gimme Three Steps"	Lynyrd Skynyrd	1970s	Southern Rock
"Interstate Love Song"	Stone Temple Pilots	1990s	Rock
"Joker & the Thief"	Wolfmother	2000s	Rock
"Little Sister"	Queens of the Stone Age	2000s	Alternative
"Live Forever"	Oasis	1990s	Rock
"March of the Pigs"	Nine Inch Nails	1990s	Rock
"Moonage Daydream"	David Bowie	1970s	Glam
"More Than a Feeling"	Boston	1970s	Classic Rock
"Move Along"	The All-American Rejects	2000s	Emo
"Siva"	The Smashing Pumpkins	1990s	Alternative
"Synchronicity II"	The Police	1980s	Pop/Rock
"Teenage Lobotomy"	Ramones	1970s	Punk
"The Kill"	Thirty Seconds to Mars	2000s	Alternative
"Truckin'"	Grateful Dead	1970s	Classic Rock
"We Care a Lot"	Faith No More	1980s	Rock

== AC/DC Live: Rock Band Track Pack ==
AC/DC Live: Rock Band Track Pack
- Developers: Harmonix, Pi Studios
- Publisher: MTV Games
- Series: Rock Band
- Platforms: Xbox 360, PlayStation 3, PlayStation 2, Wii
- Release: Xbox 360, PlayStation 3, PlayStation 2: NA: November 2, 2008; EU: December 19, 2008; Wii: NA: November 16, 2008
- Genre: Music
- Modes: Single player, multiplayer

AC/DC Live: Rock Band Track Pack (AC/DC Live: Rock Band) was announced on September 29, 2008, and was released for the PlayStation 2, PlayStation 3, and Xbox 360 on November 2. The Wii version was released on November 16, 2008. The pack contains all 18 tracks from AC/DC's Live at Donington DVD. The game, through pre-existing licensing deals that AC/DC has with the retail chains, was only available at Wal-Mart and Sam's Club. This exclusivity agreement was only applicable in the United States, and ended on November 4, 2009, when GameStop began selling new copies of the game for $20. Each copy of the track pack includes a code that can be redeemed online to allow Xbox 360 and PlayStation 3 owners to download the content to their console for use in other Rock Band titles. The game can also be played as a standalone title, including a number of achievements for Xbox 360 owners, but otherwise does not feature many of the gameplay elements of the full Rock Band titles, such as character creation or customization, online play, or a World Tour mode. The track pack retails for $30 for the PS2 version and $40 for other consoles. Harmonix has confirmed that the songs will remain exclusive to the disc release, citing AC/DC's preference to sell their music as full albums instead of singles. They have not ruled out releasing the content in the future should the band's views change.

Song title	Decade	Genre
"Back in Black" (Live)	1980s	Rock
"Dirty Deeds Done Dirt Cheap" (Live)	1970s	Rock
"Fire Your Guns" (Live)	1990s	Rock
"For Those About to Rock (We Salute You)" (Live)	1980s	Rock
"Heatseeker" (Live)	1980s	Rock
"Hell Ain't a Bad Place to Be" (Live)	1970s	Rock
"Hells Bells" (Live)	1980s	Rock
"High Voltage" (Live)	1970s	Rock
"Highway to Hell" (Live)	1970s	Rock
"Jailbreak" (Live)	1970s	Rock
"Let There Be Rock" (Live)	1970s	Rock
"Moneytalks" (Live)	1990s	Rock
"Shoot to Thrill" (Live)	1980s	Rock
"T.N.T." (Live)	1970s	Rock
"The Jack" (Live)	1970s	Rock
"Thunderstruck" (Live)	1990s	Rock
"Whole Lotta Rosie" (Live)	1970s	Rock
"You Shook Me All Night Long" (Live)	1980s	Rock

== Rock Band Track Pack Vol. 2 ==
Rock Band Track Pack Vol. 2
- Developers: Harmonix, Pi Studios
- Publisher: MTV Games
- Series: Rock Band
- Platforms: Xbox 360, PlayStation 3, PlayStation 2, Wii
- Release: Xbox 360, PlayStation 3, PlayStation 2, Wii: NA: November 18, 2008; EU: April 19, 2009
- Genre: Music
- Modes: Single player, multiplayer

Rock Band Track Pack Vol. 2 (Rock Band Song Pack 2) is an expansion disc for the Rock Band series featuring 20 master recordings previously released as downloadable content on the Xbox Live Marketplace and PlayStation Network Store. Unlike the first expansion, Vol. 2 is available on the Xbox 360 and PlayStation 3 as well as the Wii and PlayStation 2. Much like the AC/DC Live pack, the Xbox 360 and PlayStation 3 versions also include a code to download the songs to a hard drive for use in other Rock Band games.

The following songs are included on the game disc:

Song title	Artist	Decade	Genre
"Afterlife"	Avenged Sevenfold	2000s	Metal
"Call Me"	Blondie	1980s	Pop/Rock
"El Scorcho"	Weezer	1990s	Alternative
"Girl U Want"	Devo	1980s	New Wave
"Girls Who Play Guitars"	Maxïmo Park	2000s	Pop/Rock
"Indestructible"	Disturbed	2000s	Nu-Metal
"It Hurts"	Angels & Airwaves	2000s	Alternative
"Just What I Needed"	The Cars	1970s	Rock
"Message in a Bottle"	The Police	1970s	Rock
"Monkey Gone to Heaven"	Pixies	1980s	Alternative
"Rio"	Duran Duran	1980s	Pop/Rock
"Saints of Los Angeles"	Mötley Crüe	2000s	Rock
"Simple Man"	Lynyrd Skynyrd	1970s	Southern Rock
"Snow ((Hey Oh))"	Red Hot Chili Peppers	2000s	Rock
"The Perfect Drug"	Nine Inch Nails	1990s	Rock
"This Ain't a Scene, It's an Arms Race"	Fall Out Boy	2000s	Pop/Rock
"Time Is Running Out"	Papa Roach	2000s	Nu-Metal
"Why Do You Love Me"	Garbage	2000s	Pop/Rock
"You've Got Another Thing Comin'"	Judas Priest	1980s	Metal
"Zero"	The Smashing Pumpkins	1990s	Alternative

== Rock Band Track Pack: Classic Rock ==
Rock Band Track Pack: Classic Rock
- Developer: Harmonix
- Publisher: MTV Games
- Series: Rock Band
- Platforms: Xbox 360, PlayStation 3, PlayStation 2, Wii
- Release: Xbox 360, PlayStation 3, PlayStation 2, Wii: NA: May 19, 2009
- Genre: Music
- Modes: Single player, multiplayer

Rock Band Track Pack: Classic Rock is an expansion disc for the Rock Band series featuring 20 master recordings previously released as downloadable content on the Xbox Live Marketplace and PlayStation Network Store. The pack is available for Xbox 360, PlayStation 3, Wii, and PlayStation 2. The Xbox 360 and PlayStation 3 versions also include a code to export the songs to a hard drive for use in other Rock Band games. The Track Pack can also be played as a standalone game for all systems in the same manner as the AC/DC Live and Track Pack Vol. 2, and is also the first Rock Band Track Pack on Wii and on PS2 to be fully compatible with all Guitar Hero instruments.

The following songs are included on the disc:

Song title	Artist	Decade	Genre
"All Right Now"	Free	1970s	Classic Rock
"Baba O'Riley"	The Who	1970s	Classic Rock
"Bad to the Bone"	George Thorogood & the Destroyers	1980s	Rock
"Behind Blue Eyes"	The Who	1970s	Classic Rock
"California Über Alles"	Dead Kennedys	1980s	Punk
"Can't Stand Losing You"	The Police	1970s	Pop/Rock
"Closer to the Heart"	Rush	1970s	Progressive
"Funk #49"	James Gang	1970s	Classic Rock
"Hit Me with Your Best Shot"	Pat Benatar	1980s	Classic Rock
"Holiday in Cambodia"	Dead Kennedys	1980s	Punk
"Hymn 43"	Jethro Tull	1970s	Progressive
"Kiss Them for Me"	Siouxsie and the Banshees	1990s	Pop/Rock
"Let Love Rule"	Lenny Kravitz	1980s	Rock
"Love Spreads"	The Stone Roses	1990s	Alternative
"Peace of Mind"	Boston	1970s	Classic Rock
"Red Barchetta"	Rush	1980s	Progressive
"Rock and Roll Band"	Boston	1970s	Classic Rock
"Take the Money and Run"	Steve Miller Band	1970s	Classic Rock
"The Joker"	Steve Miller Band	1970s	Classic Rock
"Truth Hits Everybody"	The Police	1970s	Rock

== Rock Band Country Track Pack ==
Rock Band Country Track Pack
- Developers: Harmonix, Demiurge Studios
- Publisher: MTV Games
- Series: Rock Band
- Platforms: Xbox 360, PlayStation 3, PlayStation 2, Wii
- Release: Xbox 360, PlayStation 3, PlayStation 2, Wii: NA: July 21, 2009
- Genre: Music
- Modes: Single player, multiplayer

Harmonix released a fifth track pack named for the Xbox 360, PlayStation 3, Wii, and PlayStation 2. The disc features 21 songs, and for the first time includes songs never before seen in the Rock Band series. These songs were exclusive to Rock Band Country Track Pack for a limited time before being released to the Rock Band Music Store by late 2009 and early 2010. The Xbox 360 and PlayStation 3 versions also include a code to export the songs to a hard drive for use in other Rock Band games. The Track Pack can also be played as a standalone game for all systems in the same manner as the AC/DC Track Pack and Track Pack Vol. 2.

The following songs are included on the disc:

Song title	Artist	Decade	Genre
"3 Dimes Down"	Drive-By Truckers	2000s	Country
"Any Man of Mine"^{a}	Shania Twain	1990s	Country
"Can't Let Go"	Lucinda Williams	1990s	Country
"Cry Lonely"^{a}	Cross Canadian Ragweed	2000s	Country
"Free and Easy (Down the Road I Go)"	Dierks Bentley	2000s	Country
"Gone"^{a}	Montgomery Gentry	2000s	Country
"Good Time"^{a}	Alan Jackson	2000s	Country
"Gunpowder & Lead"	Miranda Lambert	2000s	Country
"Hillbilly Deluxe"	Brooks & Dunn	2000s	Country
"I Told You So"^{a}	Keith Urban	2000s	Country
"Me and My Gang"^{a}	Rascal Flatts	2000s	Country
"Mud on the Tires"	Brad Paisley	2000s	Country
"On the Road Again"^{a}	Willie Nelson	1980s	Country
"Satellite Radio"	Steve Earle	2000s	Country
"She's Country"^{a}	Jason Aldean	2000s	Country
"She Thinks My Tractor's Sexy"^{a}	Kenny Chesney	1990s	Country
"Sin Wagon"	Dixie Chicks	1990s	Country
"Swing"^{a}	Trace Adkins	2000s	Country
"Suds in the Bucket"^{a}	Sara Evans	2000s	Country
"The Gambler"^{a}	Kenny Rogers	1970s	Country
"This One's for the Girls"^{a}	Martina McBride	2000s	Country

^aSongs were first released to Rock Band through this disc.

== Rock Band Metal Track Pack ==
Rock Band Metal Track Pack
- Developers: Harmonix, Demiurge Studios
- Publisher: MTV Games
- Series: Rock Band
- Platforms: Xbox 360, PlayStation 3, PlayStation 2, Wii
- Release: Xbox 360, PlayStation 3, PlayStation 2, Wii: NA: September 22, 2009
- Genre: Music
- Modes: Single player, multiplayer

Rock Band Metal Track Pack for the Wii, Xbox 360, PlayStation 2, and PlayStation 3 was released on September 22, 2009. The track pack contains 20 songs, featuring a mix of new songs as well as those previously released as downloadable content. The songs debuting in this track pack were made available through the Rock Band Music Store on January 26, 2010. As with previous track packs, Metal Track Pack allows users to download the songs off the disc for use in Rock Band and Rock Band 2. This was the last Rock Band game for the PlayStation 2.

The following songs are contained on the disc:

Song title	Artist	Decade	Genre
"3's & 7's"	Queens of the Stone Age	2000s	Alternative
"Are You Dead Yet?"	Children of Bodom	2000s	Metal
"Blinded by Fear"	At the Gates	1990s	Metal
"Bulls on Parade"^{b}	Rage Against the Machine	1990s	Alternative
"Closer"	Lacuna Coil	2000s	Metal
"D.O.A."	The Haunted	2000s	Metal
"Forever"	In This Moment	2000s	Metal
"Hair of the Dog"^{b}	Nazareth	1970s	Rock
"I Stand Alone"	Godsmack	2000s	Nu-Metal
"Killed by Death '08"^{b}	Motörhead	1980s	Metal
"Laid to Rest"	Lamb of God	2000s	Metal
"Levitate"^{b}	I Mother Earth	1990s	Alternative
"Master of the Universe"^{b}	Hawkwind	1970s	Rock
"Red Devil"	Yngwie Malmsteen's; Rising Force	2000s	Metal
"Screaming for Vengeance"	Judas Priest	1980s	Metal
"Shockwave"	Black Tide	2000s	Metal
"Thrasher"	Evile	2000s	Metal
"Transmaniacon MC"^{b}	Blue Öyster Cult	1970s	Classic Rock
"Two Weeks"	All That Remains	2000s	Metal
"Waking the Demon"	Bullet for My Valentine	2000s	Metal

^bSongs were first available via this Track Pack.

== Rock Band Country Track Pack 2 ==
Rock Band Country Track Pack 2
- Developers: Harmonix, Demiurge Studios
- Publisher: MTV Games
- Series: Rock Band
- Platforms: Xbox 360, PlayStation 3, Wii
- Release: Xbox 360, PlayStation 3, Wii: NA: February 1, 2011
- Genre: Music
- Modes: Single player, multiplayer

Rock Band Country Track Pack 2 contains 21 tracks, and was released for Xbox 360, PlayStation 3, and Wii on February 1, 2011. All songs on the disc were exclusive to the Track Pack before being released as downloadable content on November 8, 2011. The retail disc export is compatible with Rock Band, Rock Band 2, and Rock Band 3 while the standalone DLC is only compatible with Rock Band 3. Both the retail disc export and standalone "RB3 Versions" feature Pro Drum tracks and Harmony Vocals where appropriate while the "RB3 Versions" additionally have Keyboard and Pro Keyboard tracks added where appropriate. A Pro Guitar upgrade is available for the "RB3 Version" of "Ride" by Trace Adkins. The "RB3 Versions" of this entire track pack are available as a bundle download in the online Rock Band store, under the name "Country Mega Pack."

The following songs are included on the disc

Song title	Artist	Decade	Genre
"That's How Country Boys Roll"	Billy Currington	2000s	Country
"Single White Female"	Chely Wright	1990s	Country
"Alright"	Darius Rucker	2000s	Country
"Awful, Beautiful Life"	Darryl Worley	2000s	Country
"Sideways"	Dierks Bentley	2000s	Country
"Intentional Heartache"	Dwight Yoakam	2000s	Country
"Man of Me"	Gary Allan	2000s	Country
"Twang"	George Strait	2000s	Country
"Crazy Town"	Jason Aldean	2010s	Country
"Ring of Fire"	Johnny Cash	1960s	Country
"Backwoods"	Justin Moore	2000s	Country
"Kiss a Girl"	Keith Urban	2000s	Country
"Perfect Day"	Lady Antebellum	2010s	Country
"Giddy On Up"	Laura Bell Bundy	2010s	Country
"Rain is a Good Thing"	Luke Bryan	2000s	Country
"Mama Tried"	Merle Haggard	1960s	Country
"Summer Nights"	Rascal Flatts	2000s	Country
"The Night the Lights Went Out in Georgia"	Reba McEntire	1990s	Country
"Party for Two" (With Billy Currington)	Shania Twain	2000s	Country
"Settlin'"	Sugarland	2000s	Country
"Ride"	Trace Adkins	2000s	Country
