= Razors Edge World Tour =

1990–1991 concert tour by AC/DC

The Razors Edge World Tour
- Tour by AC/DC
- Poster to the concert in Frankfurt, Germany
- Location: Europe; North America; Oceania
- Associated album: The Razors Edge
- Start date: 2 November 1990
- End date: 16 November 1991
- Legs: 5
- No. of shows: 160

AC/DC concert chronology
- Blow Up Your Video World Tour (1988); Razors Edge World Tour (1990–1991); Ballbreaker World Tour (1996)

The Razors Edge World Tour was a concert tour played by the Australian hard rock band AC/DC, in support of their twelfth studio album The Razors Edge. This tour had 5 legs around the world lasting 12 months starting on 2 November 1990 in Worcester, Massachusetts, finishing on 16 November 1991 in Auckland, New Zealand.

== Background ==
It was the only tour to feature drummer Chris Slade until the Rock or Bust World Tour. Williams, who was struck with a kidney infection was filled in by Paul Greg on bass for several concerts on the first North American leg.

During the tour, the hugely successful Live at Donington show was performed. A video of the show has been released on VHS, then on DVD and Blu-ray. By the end of the tour, the band had grossed over 17 million dollars.

On 18 January 1991, three teen-age fans were crushed to death at a show in Salt Lake City when they fell to the floor at the beginning of the concert and were stepped on by other concertgoers, prompting the band to stop playing early on. Audience members were asking the band to stop the concert when the band was continuing to perform. The incident has since been a sore spot for AC/DC's rhythm guitarist Malcolm Young, according to their VH1 Behind The Music special in which it is reported that he has since refused to talk about it.

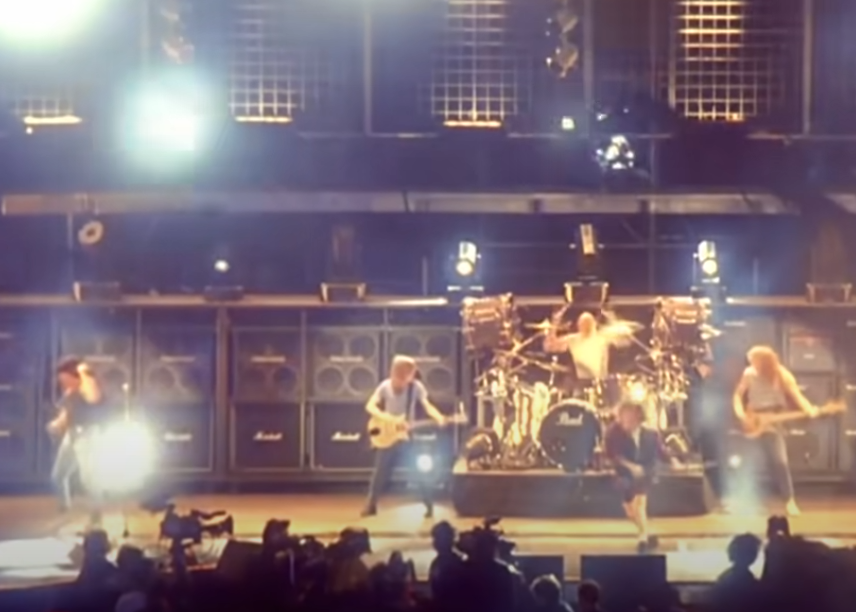
AC/DC performing in Castle Donington in 1991

King's X was the opening band for the tour's second North American leg and first European legs of the tour. L.A. Guns was the opening band for the third North American leg of the tour.

== Reception ==
Greg Haymes from the Daily Gazette gave the performance at the Knickerbocker Arena a positive review, opening with the anticipation of metalheads who weren't disappointed as the show opened with the arena rattling, while the band performed at three different volumes. Haymes also noted that even if the band may seem anachronistic or cliched, he acknowledged the teaming of the band's members fit together perfectly, even with the simplicity of their songs.

== Opening acts ==
=== Typical opening acts ===
- Love/Hate
- King's X
- L.A. Guns
- Steelheart

=== Monsters of Rock opening acts ===
- Metallica
- Queensrÿche
- The Black Crowes
- Mötley Crüe
- Negazione
- Patrick Rondat
- Legion
- Tesla
- Pantera
- E.S.T.

== Tour dates ==
List of 1990 concerts, showing date, city, country and venue
Date	City	Country	Venue
2 November 1990	Worcester	United States	Centrum in Worcester
3 November 1990	Worcester	United States	Centrum in Worcester
4 November 1990	Hartford	United States	Hartford Civic Center
6 November 1990	Philadelphia	United States	Spectrum
7 November 1990	Pittsburgh	United States	Civic Arena
9 November 1990	Toronto	Canada	SkyDome
10 November 1990	Binghamton	United States	Broome County Veterans Memorial Arena
11 November 1990	East Rutherford	United States	Brendan Byrne Arena
13 November 1990	Portland	United States	Cumberland County Civic Center
15 November 1990	Providence	United States	Providence Civic Center
17 November 1990	Richmond	United States	Richmond Coliseum
18 November 1990	Landover	United States	Capital Centre
20 November 1990	Lexington	United States	Rupp Arena
21 November 1990	Fort Wayne	United States	Allen County War Memorial Coliseum
23 November 1990	Richfield	United States	Richfield Coliseum
24 November 1990	Auburn Hills	United States	The Palace of Auburn Hills
25 November 1990	Indianapolis	United States	Market Square Arena
26 November 1990	Evansville	United States	Roberts Municipal Stadium
28 November 1990	Rockford	United States	Rockford MetroCentre
29 November 1990	Cedar Rapids	United States	Five Seasons Center
30 November 1990	Bloomington	United States	Met Center
1 December 1990	Madison	United States	Dane County Expo Coliseum
3 December 1990	Omaha	United States	Omaha Civic Auditorium
4 December 1990	Ames	United States	Hilton Coliseum
6 December 1990	St. Louis	United States	St. Louis Arena
7 December 1990	Kansas City	United States	Kemper Arena
8 December 1990	Tulsa	United States	Mabee Center
9 December 1990	Manhattan	United States	Bramlage Coliseum
12 December 1990	Sacramento	United States	ARCO Arena
13 December 1990	Daly City	United States	Cow Palace
14 December 1990	Daly City	United States	Cow Palace
15 December 1990	Long Beach	United States	Long Beach Arena
16 December 1990	Long Beach	United States	Long Beach Arena

List of 1991 concerts, showing date, city, country and venue
Date	City	Country	Venue
11 January 1991	Vancouver	Canada	Pacific Coliseum
12 January 1991	Vancouver	Canada	Pacific Coliseum
15 January 1991	Portland	United States	Portland Memorial Coliseum
16 January 1991	Tacoma	United States	Tacoma Dome
18 January 1991 (Note: Stopped after 20 minutes, as 3 people have died following chaos on the floor of the arena.)	Salt Lake City	United States	Salt Palace Acord Arena
20 January 1991	Phoenix	United States	Arizona Veterans Memorial Coliseum
23 January 1991	Denver	United States	McNichols Sports Arena
25 January 1991	Rosemont	United States	Rosemont Horizon
26 January 1991	Cincinnati	United States	Cincinnati Gardens
27 January 1991	Nashville	United States	Nashville Municipal Auditorium
29 January 1991	Memphis	United States	Mid-South Coliseum
31 January 1991	Knoxville	United States	Thompson–Boling Arena
1 February 1991	Johnson City	United States	Freedom Hall Civic Center
2 February 1991	Birmingham	United States	BJCC Coliseum
3 February 1991	New Orleans	United States	Lakefront Arena
5 February 1991	Little Rock	United States	Barton Coliseum
7 February 1991	Oklahoma City	United States	Myriad Convention Center
10 February 1991	Dallas	United States	Reunion Arena
11 February 1991	Shreveport	United States	Hirsch Memorial Coliseum
12 February 1991	Houston	United States	The Summit
15 February 1991	Atlanta	United States	The Omni Coliseum
16 February 1991	Charlotte	United States	Charlotte Coliseum
17 February 1991	Greensboro	United States	Greensboro Coliseum
19 February 1991	Jacksonville	United States	Jacksonville Memorial Coliseum
20 February 1991	Orlando	United States	Orlando Arena
21 February 1991	Miami	United States	Miami Arena
22 February 1991	St. Petersburg	United States	Florida Suncoast Dome
20 March 1991	Helsinki	Finland	Helsinki Ice Hall
22 March 1991	Stockholm	Sweden	Johanneshovs Isstadion
23 March 1991	Gothenburg	Sweden	Scandinavium
24 March 1991	Oslo	Norway	Oslo Spektrum
26 March 1991	Stuttgart	Germany	Schleyerhalle
27 March 1991	Mannheim	Germany	Maimarkthalle
28 March 1991	Paris	France	Palais Omnisports de Paris-Bercy
30 March 1991	Frankfurt	Germany	Festhalle Frankfurt
31 March 1991	Nuremberg	Germany	Frankenhalle
1 April 1991	Hanover	Germany	Eilenriedehalle
3 April 1991	Zürich	Switzerland	Hallenstadion
5 April 1991	Köln	Germany	Köln Sporthalle
6 April 1991	Leiden	Netherlands	Groenoordhallen
7 April 1991	Dortmund	Germany	Westfalenhalle
9 April 1991	Munich	Germany	Olympiahalle
10 April 1991	Munich	Germany	Olympiahalle
12 April 1991	Oldenburg	Germany	Weser-Ems Halle
13 April 1991	Kiel	Germany	Ostseehalle
15 April 1991	London	England	Wembley Arena
16 April 1991	London	England	Wembley Arena
17 April 1991	London	England	Wembley Arena
20 April 1991 (Note: Recorded for and/or included on the associated live album AC/DC Live.)	Glasgow	Scotland	S.E.C.C. Arena
22 April 1991	Birmingham	England	NEC Arena
23 April 1991	Birmingham	England	NEC Arena
24 April 1991	Birmingham	England	NEC Arena
26 April 1991	Dublin	Ireland	Point Theatre
27 April 1991	Belfast	Northern Ireland	Kings Hall
24 May 1991	Buffalo	United States	Buffalo Memorial Auditorium
25 May 1991	Burgettstown	United States	Coca-Cola Star Lake Amphitheater
27 May 1991	Charleston	United States	Charleston Civic Center
28 May 1991	Fairborn	United States	Ervin J. Nutter Center
1 June 1991	Louisville	United States	Freedom Hall
2 June 1991	Dallas	United States	Coca-Cola Starplex Amphitheatre
3 June 1991	Austin	United States	Frank Erwin Center
4 June 1991	San Antonio	United States	HemisFair Arena
5 June 1991	Albuquerque	United States	Tingley Coliseum
6 June 1991	Phoenix	United States	Desert Sky Pavilion
7 June 1991	San Diego	United States	San Diego Sports Arena
8 June 1991	Irvine	United States	Irvine Meadows Amphitheatre
10 June 1991	Los Angeles	United States	Los Angeles Memorial Sports Arena
13 June 1991	Oakland	United States	Oakland-Alameda County Coliseum Arena
14 June 1991	Mountain View	United States	Shoreline Amphitheatre
15 June 1991	Sacramento	United States	ARCO Arena
17 June 1991	Seattle	United States	Seattle Center Coliseum
18 June 1991	Seattle	United States	Seattle Center Coliseum
21 June 1991	Edmonton	Canada	Northlands Coliseum
22 June 1991	Edmonton	Canada	Northlands Coliseum
23 June 1991	Calgary	Canada	Olympic Saddledome
27 June 1991	Bloomington	United States	Met Center
28 June 1991	East Troy	United States	Alpine Valley Music Theatre
29 June 1991	Tinley Park	United States	New World Music Theater
1 July 1991	Noblesville	United States	Deer Creek Music Center
2 July 1991	Auburn Hills	United States	The Palace of Auburn Hills
3 July 1991	Richfield	United States	Richfield Coliseum
5 July 1991	Albany	United States	Knickerbocker Arena
6 July 1991	Montreal	Canada	Montreal Forum
7 July 1991	Montreal	Canada	Montreal Forum
8 July 1991	Hampton	United States	Hampton Coliseum
9 July 1991	Landover	United States	Capital Centre
10 July 1991	Philadelphia	United States	Spectrum
12 July 1991	New York City	United States	Madison Square Garden
13 July 1991	New York City	United States	Madison Square Garden
14 July 1991	Old Orchard Beach	United States	Seashore Performing Arts Center
10 August 1991	Copenhagen	Denmark	Gentofte Stadion
13 August 1991	Chorzów	Poland	Stadion Śląski
17 August 1991	Castle Donington	England	Donington Park
22 August 1991	Budapest	Hungary	Népstadion
24 August 1991	Munich	Germany	Galopprennbahn Riem
25 August 1991	Basel	Switzerland	St. Jakob Stadium
27 August 1991	Berlin	Germany	Waldbühne
28 August 1991	Berlin	Germany	Waldbühne
30 August 1991	Hasselt	Belgium	Kiewit Airfield
31 August 1991	Hanover	Germany	Niedersachsenstadion
1 September 1991	Nijmegen	Netherlands	Goffertstadion
7 September 1991	Mainz	Germany	Finthen Army Airfield
8 September 1991	Oldenburg	Germany	Weser-Ems-Halle
11 September 1991	Graz	Austria	Liebenauer Stadium
14 September 1991	Modena	Italy	Festa de l'Unità
17 September 1991	Dortmund	Germany	Westfalenhalle
18 September 1991	Dortmund	Germany	Westfalenhalle
21 September 1991	Paris	France	Hippodrome de Vincennes
24 September 1991	Barcelona	Spain	Estadi Olímpic Lluís Companys
28 September 1991 (Note: This show was originally set to be planned in Red Square, but got changed to be in Tushino Airfield.)	Moscow	Soviet Union	Tushino Airfield
14 October 1991	Sydney	Australia	Sydney Entertainment Centre
15 October 1991	Sydney	Australia	Sydney Entertainment Centre
16 October 1991	Sydney	Australia	Sydney Entertainment Centre
18 October 1991	Melbourne	Australia	National Tennis Centre
19 October 1991	Melbourne	Australia	National Tennis Centre
20 October 1991	Melbourne	Australia	National Tennis Centre
23 October 1991	Perth	Australia	Perth Entertainment Centre
24 October 1991	Perth	Australia	Perth Entertainment Centre
28 October 1991	Adelaide	Australia	Adelaide Entertainment Centre
29 October 1991	Adelaide	Australia	Adelaide Entertainment Centre
1 November 1991	Melbourne	Australia	National Tennis Centre
5 November 1991	Boondall	Australia	Brisbane Entertainment Centre
6 November 1991	Boondall	Australia	Brisbane Entertainment Centre
8 November 1991	Sydney	Australia	Sydney Entertainment Centre
9 November 1991	Sydney	Australia	Sydney Entertainment Centre
10 November 1991	Sydney	Australia	Sydney Entertainment Centre
14 November 1991 (Note: The show was originally scheduled the day before, but postponed because the stage roof collapsed due to high wind gusts and bad weather.)	Wellington	New Zealand	Athletic Park
16 November 1991	Auckland	New Zealand	Mount Smart Stadium

=== Box office score data ===
List of box office score data with date, city, venue, attendance, gross, references
Date	City	Venue	Attendance	Gross	Ref.
2–3 November 1990	Worcester, United States	Centrum	21,653 / 24,000	$433,060	
6 November 1990	Philadelphia, United States	Spectrum	14,558	$278,012	
7 November 1990	Pittsburgh, United States	Civic Arena	14,878	$260,682	
9 November 1990	Toronto, Canada	SkyDome	27,954	$606,246	
11 November 1990	East Rutherford, United States	Meadowlands Arena	18,821	$370,996	
15 November 1990	Providence, United States	Civic Center	12,531 / 13,000	$244,354	
17 November 1990	Richmond, United States	Coliseum	11,107 / 12,500	$198,750	
20 November 1990	Lexington, United States	Rupp Arena	10,513 / 14,200	$197,119	
23 November 1990	Richfield, United States	Coliseum	17,159	$340,464	
24 November 1990	Auburn Hills, United States	Palace	17,741	$352,210	
25 November 1990	Indianapolis, United States	Market Square Arena	14,162 / 15,500	$261,997	
30 November 1990	Bloomington, United States	Met Center	14,908	$287,800	
3 December 1990	Omaha, United States	Civic Auditorium	10,519	$196,032	
6 December 1990	St. Louis, United States	Arena	11,312 / 12,700	$212,960	
7 December 1990	Kansas City, United States	Kemper Arena	9,429 / 11,290	$185,880	
12 December 1990	Sacramento, United States	ARCO Sports Arena	17,809	$394,560	
15–16 December 1990	Long Beach, United States	Arena	17,809	$394,560	
15 January 1991	Portland, United States	Arena	12,362	$239,013	
16 January 1991	Tacoma, United States	Dome	25,607	$428,474	
20 January 1991	Phoenix, United States	Veterans Memorial Coliseum	13,628	$265,117	
23 January 1991	Denver, United States	McNichols Sports Arena	15,075	$313,683	
25 January 1991	Rosemont, United States	Horizon	13,753	$307,901	
26 January 1991	Cincinnati, United States	Gardens	9,824	$180,248	
29 January 1991	Memphis, United States	Mid-South Coliseum	9,669 / 9,961	$178,877	
31 January 1991	Knoxville, United States	Thompson-Boling Assembly Center & Arena	10,880	$201,033	
2 February 1991	Birmingham, United States	Birmingham-Jefferson Civic Center	14,272 / 17,500	$267,993	
5 February 1991	Little Rock, United States	Barton Coliseum	9,239 / 10,000	$170,922	
7 February 1991	Oklahoma City, United States	Myriad Convention Center Arena	8,801 / 9,000	$158,194	
10 February 1991	Dallas, United States	Reunion Arena	16,963	$311,459	
12 February 1991	Houston, United States	The Summit	15,876	$295,389	
15 February 1991	Atlanta, United States	The Omni	15,136	$290,072	
16 February 1991	Charlotte, United States	Coliseum	18,379	$344,741	
17 February 1991	Greensboro, United States	Coliseum	13,663	$254,058	
19 February 1991	Jacksonville, United States	Coliseum	9,502 / 10,400	$187,665	
20 February 1991	Orlando, United States	Centroplex Arena	11,342 / 12,220	$224,005	
21 February 1991	Miami, United States	Arena	10,921 / 12,950	$226,611	
22 February 1991	St. Petersburg, United States	Florida Suncoast Dome	16,234 / 17,500	$320,622	

== Personnel ==
- Brian Johnson – lead vocals
- Angus Young – lead guitar, backing vocals on "Dirty Deeds Done Dirt Cheap" and "T.N.T"
- Malcolm Young – rhythm guitar, backing vocals
- Cliff Williams – bass, backing vocals
- Chris Slade – drums

Additional musicians

- Paul Greg – bass
