= Live at Donington (AC/DC album) =

Video by AC/DC
- Released: 26 October 1992 (VHS); 3 November 2003 (DVD); 16 October 2007 (Blu-ray)
- Recorded: 17 August 1991
- Venue: Donington Park
- Genres: Hard rock, rock and roll
- Length: 120:00

Live at Donington is the DVD recording of the Australian rock band AC/DC‘s show at Donington Park on 17 August 1991, directed by David Mallet; it was the band's third Monsters of Rock festival. The two-hour show was performed before 72,500 spectators and included real cannons, the Hells Bell, an inflatable Rosie and two inflatable Anguses: one to the right of the stage, and one in the back of the stage during Hell Ain't a Bad Place to Be. It was filmed in 35 mm Panavision and had 26 cameras that included one situated inside a helicopter. The DVD includes special features such as stereo and 5.1 surround sound, Iso-cam versions of certain songs for different band members, and audio commentary from Angus and Malcolm Young.

Another option allows the viewer to focus on just one member for the length of a song. This option is available for Angus Young on "Thunderstruck", "Back in Black", and "Highway to Hell". The option is offered for Malcolm Young on "T.N.T.", Brian Johnson on "Whole Lotta Rosie" and Cliff Williams on "Dirty Deeds Done Dirt Cheap". For unknown reasons, this option was not available for Chris Slade. One other feature is a full catalogue discography with audio interview of all international albums.

Despite the commercial success of the DVD, many hardcore fans were disappointed that the audio was ‘fixed’ with various overdubs, resulting in many differences from the original audio, although the DVD officially released in Brazil used the original audio. The tracks from Live at Donington on AC/DC Live use the original audio.

The audio was used for the Harmonix game AC/DC Live: Rock Band Track Pack.

Professional ratings
Review scores
Source	Rating
Allmusic	4/5 stars

== Set list ==
1. "Thunderstruck"
2. "Shoot to Thrill"
3. "Back in Black"
4. "Hell Ain't a Bad Place to Be"
5. "Heatseeker"
6. "Fire Your Guns"
7. "Jailbreak"
8. "The Jack"
9. "Dirty Deeds Done Dirt Cheap"
10. "Moneytalks"
11. "Hells Bells"
12. "High Voltage"
13. "Whole Lotta Rosie"
14. "You Shook Me All Night Long"
15. "T.N.T."
16. "Let There Be Rock"
17. "Highway to Hell"
18. "For Those About to Rock (We Salute You)"

== Personnel ==
- Brian Johnson - lead vocals
- Angus Young - lead guitar, backing vocals on "Dirty Deeds Done Dirt Cheap" and "T.N.T."
- Malcolm Young - rhythm guitar, backing vocals
- Cliff Williams - bass guitar, backing vocals
- Chris Slade - drums, percussion

== Other releases ==
=== Blu-ray ===
This concert was released for the first time in high-definition on Blu-ray Disc by Sony BMG on October 16, 2007. The video is in 1080p, and is a brand new 35 mm film transfer that includes a PCM 5.1 (48 kHz, 24 bit) soundtrack.

=== Rock Band ===
The concert has been released in the form of playable songs for the music video game series Rock Band under the name of AC/DC Live: Rock Band Track Pack.

The Track Pack was released on November 2, 2008. In line with other AC/DC promotions, the track pack was only available through Wal-Mart and Sam's Club in the United States.

== Certifications ==
Region	Certification	Certified units/sales
Argentina (CAPIF)	Platinum	8,000^{^}
Australia (ARIA)	7× Platinum	105,000^{^}
Austria (IFPI Austria)	Gold	5,000^{*}
Finland (Musiikkituottajat)	Gold	8,078
France (SNEP)	2× Platinum	40,000^{*}
Germany (BVMI) video	3× Platinum	150,000^{^}
Germany (BVMI) album	Gold	250,000^{‡}
Spain (Promusicae)	Gold	10,000^{^}
Sweden (GLF)	Gold	10,000^{^}
Switzerland (IFPI Switzerland)	Platinum	6,000^{^}
United Kingdom (BPI)	2× Platinum	100,000^{*}
United States (RIAA)	6× Platinum	600,000^{^}
^{*} Sales figures based on certification alone.^{^} Shipments figures based on certification alone.^{‡} Sales+streaming figures based on certification alone.
