= David Mallet (director) =

British music video director

- Born: David Victor Mark Mallet; 17 December 1945 (age 80); West Horsley, Surrey, England
- Occupations: Director; producer
- Years active: 1964–present

David Victor Mark Mallet (born 17 December 1945) is a British director of music videos and concert films. He was one of the most prolific directors of music videos in the 1980s.

== Career ==
Mallet rose to prominence in the late 1970s as a director of the then new format of music videos with the hugely successful enterprise MGMM, which he co-founded with Scott Millaney, Brian Grant and Russell Mulcahy. He is noted for his innovative work on hugely popular music videos in the 1980s, becoming one of the decade's most sought-after directors for this format. His work includes Iron Maiden's "Run to the Hills", David Bowie's "Ashes to Ashes" and "Let's Dance", Rush's "Distant Early Warning", and Queen's "Radio Ga Ga" and "I Want to Break Free" videos. He has directed numerous videos for AC/DC since the 1980s. He has also served as a producer on television programmes including The Kenny Everett Video Show. He is also known for directing some concert recordings of soprano Sarah Brightman and other major live music and spectacle events such as 46664 and Cirque du Soleil. He has also directed such prominent concerts as Pink Floyd's Pulse and U2's PopMart: Live from Mexico City.

== Videography ==
=== Music videos ===
As director:

- Queen: "Bicycle Race" (1978)
- Blondie: "Hanging on the Telephone" (1978)
- Blondie: "Accidents Never Happen" (1979)
- Blondie: "Die Young Stay Pretty" (1979)
- Blondie: "Dreaming" (1979)
- Blondie: "Eat to the Beat" (1979)
- Blondie: "Living in the Real World" (1979)
- Blondie: "Shayla" (1979)
- Blondie: "Slow Motion" (1979)
- Blondie: "Sound-A-Sleep" (1979)
- Blondie: "The Hardest Part" (1979)
- Blondie: "Union City Blue" (1979)
- Blondie: "Victor" (1979)
- Boomtown Rats: "Diamond Smiles" (1979)
- Boomtown Rats: "Rat Trap" (1979)
- David Bowie: "Boys Keep Swinging" (1979)
- David Bowie: "DJ" (1979)
- David Bowie: "Look Back in Anger" (1979)
- David Bowie: "Space Oddity" (1979)
- Blondie: "Atomic" (1980)
- Blondie: "Call Me - Version 1" (1980)
- Boomtown Rats "I Don't Like Mondays" (1980)
- David Bowie: "Ashes to Ashes" (1980; directed with David Bowie)
- David Bowie: "Fashion" (1980)
- Joan Jett: "Bad Reputation" (1980)
- Peter Gabriel: "Games Without Frontiers" (1980)
- The Rolling Stones: "Emotional Rescue" (Version 2) (1980)
- The Rolling Stones: "She's So Cold" (1980)
- Roxy Music: "Same Old Scene" (1980)
- Queen and David Bowie: "Under Pressure" (1981)
- David Bowie: "Wild Is the Wind" (1981)
- David Bowie: "The Drowned Girl" (1981)
- Sheila: "Little Darlin'" (1981)
- Sheila: "Put It in Writing" (1981)
- Bow Wow Wow: "Chihuahua" (1981)
- Boomtown Rats: "Never in a Million Years" (1981)
- The Pretenders: "Talk of the Town" (1981)
- Billy Idol: "White Wedding" (1982)
- Def Leppard: "Photograph" (1982)
- Def Leppard: "Rock of Ages" (1982)
- Haircut One Hundred: "Fantastic Day" (1982)
- Haircut One Hundred: "Love Plus One" (1982)
- Iron Maiden: "Run to the Hills" (1982)
- Iron Maiden: "The Number of the Beast" (1982)
- Joan Jett: "Crimson and Clover" (1982)
- Joan Jett: "Do You Wanna Touch Me (Oh Yeah)" (1982)
- Toyah: "Brave New World" (1982)
- Def Leppard: "Foolin'" (1983)
- David Bowie: "Let's Dance" (1983; directed with David Bowie)
- David Bowie: "China Girl" (1983; directed with David Bowie)
- Donna Summer: "Unconditional Love" (1983)
- Iron Maiden: "The Trooper" (1983)
- Joan Jett: "Fake Friends" (1983)
- Joan Jett: "French Song" (1983)
- Joan Jett: "Everyday People" (1983)
- Olivia Newton-John with John Travolta: "Take a Chance" (1983)
- Queen: "Radio Ga Ga" (1984; filmed 1983)
- Tina Turner: "Let's Stay Together" (1983)
- Lita Ford: "Gotta Let Go" (song) (1984)
- Def Leppard: "Bringin' On the Heartbreak" (1984)
- Rush: "Distant Early Warning" (1984)
- Rush: "Red Sector A" (1984)
- Def Leppard: "Me and My Wine" (1984)
- Scorpions: "Rock You Like a Hurricane" (1984)
- Queen: "I Want to Break Free" (1984)
- Queen: "Hammer to Fall" (1984)
- David Bowie: "Loving the Alien" (1984; directed with David Bowie)
- Billy Idol: "Eyes Without a Face" (1984)
- Billy Idol: "Catch My Fall" (1984)
- Kool and the Gang: "Fresh" (1984)
- Culture Club: "Mistake No.3" (1984)
- Joan Jett: "I Love You Love Me Love" (1984)
- Rick Springfield: "Don't Walk Away" (1984)
- Bryan Adams with Tina Turner: It's Only Love" (1985)
- David Bowie and Mick Jagger: "Dancing in the Street" (1985)
- Diana Ross: "Chain Reaction" (1985)
- Dokken: "Into the Fire" (1985)
- Feargal Sharkey: "A Good Heart" (1985)
- Feargal Sharkey: "You Little Thief" (1985)
- Freddie Mercury: "I Was Born to Love You" (1985)
- Freddie Mercury: "Made in Heaven" (1985)
- Heart: "What About Love" (1985)
- KISS: "Tears Are Falling" (1985)
- KISS: "Uh! All Night" (1985)
- KISS: "Who Wants to Be Lonely" (1985)
- Olivia Newton-John: "Culture Shock" (1985)
- Olivia Newton-John: "Emotional Tangle" (1985)
- Olivia Newton-John: "Soul Kiss" (1985)
- Olivia Newton-John: "The Right Moment" (1985)
- Olivia Newton-John: "Toughen Up" (1985)
- Paul Young: "Every Time You Go Away (Version 2)" (1985)
- Tina Turner: "Show Some Respect" (1985)
- AC/DC: "You Shook Me All Night Long" (1986)
- AC/DC : "Who Made Who" (1986)
- Billy Idol: "To Be a Lover" (1986)
- Feargal Sharkey: "Someone to Somebody" (1986)
- Queen: "Who Wants to Live Forever" (1986)
- Iggy Pop: "Isolation" (1987)
- AC/DC: "Heatseeker" (1988)
- Freddie Mercury: "The Great Pretender" (1987)
- Freddie Mercury and Montserrat Caballé: "Barcelona" (1987)
- Queen: "I Want It All" (1989)
- AC/DC: "Thunderstruck" (1990)
- AC/DC: "Moneytalks" (1990)
- AC/DC: "Are You Ready" (1991)
- AC/DC: "Dirty Deeds Done Dirt Cheap" (1991)
- AC/DC: "Highway to Hell" (1991)
- Erasure: "Chorus" (1991)
- Erasure: "Love to Hate You" (1991)
- INXS: "Shining Star" (1991)
- Brian May: "Too Much Love Will Kill You" (1992)
- AC/DC: "Big Gun" (1993)
- Tina Turner: "Proud Mary" (1995)
- Roger Taylor: "Nazis 1994" (1994)
- AC/DC: "Hard as a Rock" (1995)
- AC/DC: "Cover You in Oil" (1995)
- AC/DC: "Hail Caesar" (1995)
- Queen: "Heaven for Everyone" (1995)
- David Bowie with Pet Shop Boys: "Hallo Spaceboy" (1996)
- Janet Jackson: "You" (1998)
- Cher: "All Or Nothing" (1999)
- Scorpions: "To Be No. 1" (1999)
- Rod Stewart: "Blue Skies" (2005)
- P!nk: "Leave Me Alone (I'm Lonely)" (2007)
- AC/DC: "Rock 'n' Roll Train" (2008)
- AC/DC: "Anything Goes" (2009)
- AC/DC: "Shoot to Thrill" (2010)
- AC/DC: "Play Ball" (2014)
- AC/DC: "Rock or Bust" (2014)
- AC/DC: "Rock the Blues Away" (2015)
- AC/DC: "Shot in the Dark" (2020)

=== Long-form videos ===
- Blondie: Eat to the Beat (1980)
- Jethro Tull: Slipstream (1981; filmed 1980)
- Tina Turner: Nice N Rough (1982; Live)
- Asia: Asia in Asia (1984; filmed 1983)
- David Bowie: Serious Moonlight (1984/2006; filmed 1983)
- Rush: Grace Under Pressure Live (1986/2006; filmed 1984)
- Tina Turner: Break Every Rule (1986; live)
- David Bowie: Glass Spider (1988/2007; filmed 1987)
- Madonna: Blond Ambition World Tour Live (1990)
- INXS: Live Baby Live (1991)
- AC/DC: Live at Donington (1992/2003/2007; filmed 1991)
- Erasure: The Tank, the Swan and the Balloon (1993; filmed 1992)
- David Bowie: Black Tie White Noise (1993)
- Queen+: The Freddie Mercury Tribute Concert (1993/2002; filmed 1992)
- U2: Zoo TV: Live from Sydney (1994/2006; filmed 1993)
- Pink Floyd: Pulse (1995/2006; filmed 1994)
- The Rolling Stones: Voodoo Lounge (1995; filmed 1994)
- Tina Turner: What's Love? Live! (1995)
- AC/DC: No Bull (1996/2008; filmed 1996)
- Tina Turner: Wildest Dreams Live in Amsterdam (1996; Live)
- Sarah Brightman: Sarah Brightman: In Concert (1997)
- U2: PopMart: Live from Mexico City (1998/2007; filmed 1997)
- Phil Collins: Live and Loose in Paris (1998; filmed 1997)
- Cirque du Soleil: Quidam (1999)
- Tina Turner: Celebrate 60th Birthday (1999; Live)
- Tina Turner: One Last Time Live in Concert (2000; Live)
- Luis Miguel: Vivo (2000)
- Sarah Brightman: La Luna Live in Concert (2000; filmed 2000)
- Cirque du Soleil: Dralion (2001; filmed 2000)
- David Gilmour: David Gilmour in Concert (2002)
- Cirque du Soleil: La Nouba (2004; filmed 2003)
- Sarah Brightman: The Harem World Tour Live From Las Vegas (2004; filmed 2004)
- Rod Stewart: One Night Only! Rod Stewart Live at Royal Albert Hall (2004)
- Queen + Paul Rodgers: Return of the Champions (2005)
- David Gilmour: Remember That Night (2007; filmed 2006)
- Michael Flatley: Lord of the Dance (2007, filmed 1996)
- Elton John: Elton 60 – Live at Madison Square Garden (2007; filmed 2007)
- Genesis: When in Rome 2007 (2008; filmed 2007)
- Michael Flatley: Feet of Flames (2007, filmed 1998)
- Queen + Paul Rodgers: Live in Ukraine (2009, filmed 2008)
- Tina Turner: Tina Live (2009; Live)
- Cher: Do You Believe? Tour (1999, filmed 1999)
- Cher: The Farewell Tour (2003, show filmed in 2002)
- Barry Manilow: Music and Passion
- Michael Flatley: Celtic Tiger Live' (2007, filmed in 2005)
- Cirque du Soleil: Delirium (2008)
- AC/DC: Live at River Plate (Black Ice Tour) (2011, show filmed in 2009)
- The Rolling Stones: Totally Stripped (2016, filmed 1995)

== Filmography ==
- Cats (1998)
- Joseph and the Amazing Technicolor Dreamcoat (1999)
