= Are You Ready (AC/DC song) =

1991 single by AC/DC

Single by AC/DC

from the album The Razors Edge
- B-side: "Got You by the Balls"
- Released: 28 March 1991
- Length: 4:10
- Label: Albert; ATCO
- Songwriters: Angus Young; Malcolm Young
- Producer: Bruce Fairbairn

AC/DC singles chronology
"Moneytalks" (1990)	"Are You Ready" (1991)	"Highway to Hell" (live) (1992)

Music video
- "Are You Ready" on YouTube

"Are You Ready" is a song by Australian rock band AC/DC. It is featured on the band's 1990 album The Razors Edge. A live version of the song recorded on the tour of the same name appeared on one of AC/DC's two live albums of 1992, Live: 2 CD Collector's Edition. The song peaked at number one in New Zealand, becoming the band's only number-one hit there. The song also peaked at number 16 on the US Billboard Album Rock Tracks chart, number six in Ireland, number 14 in Finland, and number 18 in Australia. Music & Media magazine called the song "the best example of a rhetorical question". "Are You Ready" was used as the official theme for WWE SmackDown on Fox.

== Music video ==
The music video to this song, directed by David Mallet, shows prisoners attending an AC/DC mini-concert at their prison. One prisoner is being dressed up to get ready for the band to play the song. Guards shave his head nearly bald, leaving hairs that make up AC/DC's logo, the one similar to the cover of the band's music video tape, Clipped. The video was filmed at Bray Studios (UK), with those portraying the prisoners having responded to an open invitation broadcast by Tommy Vance during his Friday Rock Show on BBC Radio 1 a few days earlier. Respondents were instructed to make their way to Baker Street in London, where they were issued their 'uniforms' and transported by coach to Bray.

== Track listings ==
7-inch and cassette single

1. "Are You Ready"
2. "Got You by the Balls"
- Two limited-edition 7-inch singles were also issued in the UK. One included an AC/DC patch while another was issued in a sleeve designed as a satchel.

Australian 12-inch and CD single

1. "Are You Ready" – 4:10
2. "Got You by the Balls" – 4:29
3. "D.T." – 2:59
4. "Chase the Ace" – 3:00

European 12-inch and CD single

1. "Are You Ready" – 4:10
2. "Got You by the Balls" – 4:29
3. "The Razors Edge" – 4:22

== Personnel ==
- Brian Johnson – lead vocals
- Angus Young – lead guitar
- Malcolm Young – rhythm guitar, background vocals
- Cliff Williams – bass guitar, background vocals
- Chris Slade – drums

== Charts ==
=== Weekly charts ===
Chart (1991)	Peak position
Australia (ARIA)	18
Europe (Eurochart Hot 100)	73
Finland (Suomen virallinen lista)	14
Germany (GfK)	38
Ireland (IRMA)	6
New Zealand (Recorded Music NZ)	1
UK Singles (OCC)	34
US Mainstream Rock (Billboard)	16

=== Year-end charts ===
Chart (1991)	Position
New Zealand (RIANZ)	27

== Certifications ==
Region	Certification	Certified units/sales
Canada (Music Canada)	Gold	40,000^{‡}
New Zealand (RMNZ)	Gold	5,000^{*}
^{*} Sales figures based on certification alone.^{‡} Sales+streaming figures based on certification alone.

== Release history ==
Region	Date	Format(s)	Label(s)	Ref.
United Kingdom	28 March 1991	Limited-edition 7-inch single	ATCO	
United Kingdom	15 April 1991	7-inch vinyl; 12-inch vinyl; CD; cassette	ATCO	
Australia	26 April 1991	CD	ATCO	
