= Angus Bucks =

Fake currency

Angus Bucks, Angus Bills or AC/DC Dollars are usually fake (aka exonumia, fantasy issue), United States one-dollar bills featuring Angus Young, the lead guitarist from the Australian rock 'n' roll band AC/DC. Thousands were dropped on the audience as a theatrical gimmick at the end of the song "Moneytalks" during the band's tour to promote their 1990 album The Razors Edge. In 2019 a commemorative 1 dollar fine gold coin was issued for the Cook Islands by CIT, in the shape of a gold foil bank note, with the reverse showing an Angus Buck.

An Angus Buck

== Design ==
Angus Young takes the place of George Washington on the front. On the back in place of the Great Seal and the bald eagle, are the cannon from the band's 1981 album For Those About to Rock We Salute You and a large iron bell representing the song "Hells Bells" from their 1980 album Back In Black.

== Additional appearances ==
They were featured in the music video for "Moneytalks" which can be found on their DVD, Family Jewels. Additionally, AC/DC concert DVDs subsequent to the release of The Razors Edge, which include "Moneytalks" in the set list, also feature their appearance, for example, Live at Donington.

== Collectable ==
In 1992, copies of AC/DC's Live double album included both a poster and an Angus Buck. They are now collector's items and can be found online from private sellers like eBay.

A different type of Angus Buck was released in AC/DC Backtracks Boxset. It was a replica of an Australian $100 Note, on both sides featuring Angus Young holding two cannonballs with their fuses lit.

== Use as actual currency ==
Coinciding with the Razors Edge tour, the Soviet Union disintegrated. As a token of thanks for his youthful followers, Boris Yeltsin arranged for AC/DC to add Moscow to the tour. The venue had to be relocated numerous times due to high demand, eventually settling on an airfield. Due to the volatile political and economic climate, the Soviet rouble was suffering from severe inflation. For an extremely short period of time, Angus Bucks dropped on the crowd had more value than the rouble itself and were actually used for regular monetary transactions. The Angus Buck crossed the boundary in 2019 from exonumia to actual currency with the release by CIT of a 1 Cook Islands dollar coin in .999 gold, in the form of a laminated gold foil banknote (amount of gold : 1/10th of a gram), measuring 156×67 mm. The reverse features a reproduction of an Angus Buck while the obverse shows the effigy of HM Queen Elizabeth II in dollar style
