= All the Best: The Live Collection =

Video by Tina Turner
- Released: March 15, 2005
- Genre: Live
- Length: 150 minutes
- Label: Parlophone

Tina Turner chronology
One Last Time Live in Concert (2001)	All the Best: The Live Collection (2005)	Tina Live (2009)

All the Best: The Live Collection is a DVD by Tina Turner. The set includes a total of 25 songs and a 25-minute interview. The DVD was certified Gold by the RIAA in the United States.

== Track listing ==
1. "Steamy Windows"
2. "Show Some Respect"
3. "I Can't Stand the Rain"
4. "River Deep – Mountain High"
5. "Missing You"
6. "GoldenEye"
7. "Addicted to Love"
8. "Private Dancer"
9. "Let's Stay Together"
10. "What's Love Got to Do with It"
11. "I Don't Wanna Fight"
12. "In Your Wildest Dreams"
13. "When the Heartache Is Over"
14. "We Don't Need Another Hero"
15. "It's Only Love" (with Bryan Adams)
16. "Tonight" (with David Bowie)
17. "Nutbush City Limits"
18. "Better Be Good to Me"
19. "Proud Mary"
20. "Whatever You Need"

Extras

1. All the Best -- Interview
2. "The Best"
3. "Open Arms" (Live on Parkinson)
4. "Paradise Is Here"
5. "Be Tender with Me Baby"
6. "Cose Della Vita" (with Eros Ramazzotti)

== Certifications ==
Region	Certification	Certified units/sales
Argentina (CAPIF)	Platinum	8,000^{^}
Australia (ARIA)	Platinum	15,000^{^}
Germany (BVMI)	Gold	25,000^{^}
United States (RIAA)	Gold	50,000^{^}
^{^} Shipments figures based on certification alone.
