= AC/DC Live =

1992 live album by AC/DC

Live album by AC/DC
- Released: 26 October 1992
- Recorded: 20 April–28 September 1991
- Genre: Hard rock
- Length: 71:12 (Single disc edition); 132:08 (Double disc edition)
- Labels: Albert; ATCO
- Producer: Bruce Fairbairn

AC/DC chronology
The Razors Edge (1990)	AC/DC Live (1992)	Ballbreaker (1995)

2 CD edition
- The deluxe two-disc version was originally packaged in a long cardboard sleeve

Singles from AC/DC Live
- 1. "Highway to Hell (live)" Released: 5 October 1992; 2. "Dirty Deeds Done Dirt Cheap (Live)" Released: 22 February 1993

AC/DC Live is the second live album by Australian hard rock band AC/DC, released in October 1992. Two versions were released, one containing a single CD, with the second version being a double album on LP and CD known as AC/DC Live: 2 CD Collector's Edition. A feature-length live video, AC/DC: Live at Donington, was released concurrently. The double album AC/DC Live: 2 CD Collector's Edition was released a month after the single-disc version, in a slipcased two-disc "book" (similar in shape to old CD longboxes) and containing an AC/DC dollar note known as "Angus Bucks". Both editions of the album were re-released in 2003 as part of the AC/DC Remasters series.

== Reception ==
Professional ratings
Review scores
Source	Rating
AllMusic	3/5 stars
Blender	3/5 stars
Collector's Guide to Heavy Metal	6/10
The Encyclopedia of Popular Music	2/5 stars
Entertainment Weekly	B+
The Rolling Stone Album Guide	2.5/5 stars

Barry Weber of AllMusic writes: "All too often, a live album is a cheaply made, rushed recording that only serves as a testament to a band's decline. AC/DC Live, however, shows what makes this band different from their peers - here they are still entirely capable of pulling off a great live show. This ranks among the best live Rock 'N' Roll albums of the '90s." Classic Rock wrote that "Live is a triumphant refutation to anyone who still claims 'DC died with Bon. Jonno [Brian Johnson] is in fine voice and good humour throughout, and the live setting gives Angus space to stretch out a bit."

== Track listings ==
=== 1 CD edition ===
No.	Title	Writer(s)	Length
1.	"Thunderstruck" (Donington Park, Leicestershire, England; 17 August 1991)	Angus Young; Malcolm Young	6:34
2.	"Shoot to Thrill" (NEC, Birmingham, England; 23 April 1991)	A. Young; M. Young; Brian Johnson	5:21
3.	"Back in Black" (Donington Park, Leicestershire, England; 17 August 1991)	A. Young; M. Young; Johnson	4:28
4.	"Who Made Who" (NEC, Birmingham, England; 23 April 1991)	A. Young; M. Young; Johnson	5:15
5.	"Heatseeker" (NEC, Birmingham, England; 23 April 1991)	A. Young; M. Young; Johnson	3:37
6.	"The Jack" (Tushino Airfield, Moscow, Russia; 28 September 1991)	A. Young; M. Young; Bon Scott	6:56
7.	"Moneytalks" (NEC, Birmingham, England; 23 April 1991)	A. Young; M. Young	4:18
8.	"Hells Bells" (Northlands Coliseum, Edmonton, AB, Canada; 21 June 1991)	A. Young; M. Young; Johnson	6:01
9.	"Dirty Deeds Done Dirt Cheap" (NEC, Birmingham, England; 23 April 1991)	A. Young; M. Young; Scott	5:02
10.	"Whole Lotta Rosie" (Tushino Airfield, Moscow, Russia; 28 September 1991)	A. Young; M. Young; Scott	4:30
11.	"You Shook Me All Night Long" (Donington Park, Leicestershire, England; 17 August 1991)	A. Young; M. Young; Johnson	3:54
12.	"Highway to Hell" (S.E.C.C., Glasgow, Scotland; 20 April 1991)	A. Young; M. Young; Scott	3:58
13.	"T.N.T." (NEC, Birmingham, England; 23 April 1991)	A. Young; M. Young; Scott	3:47
14.	"For Those About to Rock (We Salute You)" (Northlands Coliseum, Edmonton, AB, Canada; 22 June 1991)	A. Young; M. Young; Johnson	7:09

=== 2 CD "Collector's Edition" ===
Disc one
No.	Title	Writer(s)	Length
1.	"Thunderstruck" (Donington Park, Leicestershire, England; 17 August 1991)	A. Young; M. Young	6:34
2.	"Shoot to Thrill" (NEC, Birmingham, England; 23 April 1991)	A. Young; M. Young; Johnson	5:21
3.	"Back in Black" (Donington Park, Leicestershire, England; 17 August 1991)	A. Young; M. Young; Johnson	4:28
4.	"Sin City" (NEC, Birmingham, England; 23 April 1991)	A. Young; M. Young; Scott	5:40
5.	"Who Made Who" (NEC, Birmingham, England; 23 April 1991)	A. Young; M. Young; Johnson	5:16
6.	"Heatseeker" (NEC, Birmingham, England; 23 April 1991)	A. Young; M. Young; Johnson	3:37
7.	"Fire Your Guns" (Donington Park, Leicestershire, England; 17 August 1991)	A. Young; M. Young	3:42
8.	"Jailbreak" (NEC, Birmingham, England; 23 April 1991)	A. Young; M. Young; Scott	14:43
9.	"The Jack" (Tushino Airfield, Moscow, Russia; 28 September 1991)	A. Young; M. Young; Scott	6:57
10.	"The Razors Edge" (NEC, Birmingham, England; 24 April 1991)	A. Young; M. Young	4:36
11.	"Dirty Deeds Done Dirt Cheap" (NEC, Birmingham, England; 23 April 1991)	A. Young; M. Young; Scott	5:03
12.	"Moneytalks" (NEC, Birmingham, England; 23 April 1991)	A. Young; M. Young	4:20

Disc two
No.	Title	Writer(s)	Length
1.	"Hells Bells" (Northlands Coliseum, Edmonton, AB, Canada; 21 June 1991)	A. Young; M. Young; Johnson	6:01
2.	"Are You Ready" (Northlands Coliseum, Edmonton, AB, Canada; 21 June 1991)	A. Young; M. Young	4:34
3.	"That's the Way I Wanna Rock 'n' Roll" (Northlands Coliseum, Edmonton, AB, Canada; 21 June 1991)	A. Young; M. Young; Johnson	3:57
4.	"High Voltage" (Northlands Coliseum, Edmonton, AB, Canada; 21 June 1991)	A. Young; M. Young; Scott	10:32
5.	"You Shook Me All Night Long" (Donington Park, Leicestershire, England; 17 August 1991)	A. Young; M. Young; Johnson	3:54
6.	"Whole Lotta Rosie" (Tushino Airfield, Moscow, Russia; 28 September 1991)	A. Young; M. Young; Scott	4:30
7.	"Let There Be Rock" (S.E.C.C., Glasgow, Scotland; 20 April 1991)	A. Young; M. Young; Scott	12:17
8.	"Bonny" (S.E.C.C., Glasgow, Scotland; 20 April 1991)	Trad. arr. A. Young, M. Young	1:03
9.	"Highway to Hell" (S.E.C.C., Glasgow, Scotland; 20 April 1991)	A. Young; M. Young; Scott	3:53
10.	"T.N.T." (NEC, Birmingham, England; 23 April 1991)	A. Young; M. Young; Scott	3:48
11.	"For Those About to Rock (We Salute You)" (Northlands Coliseum, Edmonton, AB, Canada; 22 June 1991)	A. Young; M. Young; Johnson	7:09

Japan bonus track
No.	Title	Writer(s)	Length
12.	"Hell Ain't a Bad Place to Be" (Donington Park, Leicestershire, England; 17 August 1991)	A. Young; M. Young; Scott	4:15

- "Hell Ain't a Bad Place to Be" was the b-side of the "Highway to Hell" (live) single. This track was later included on the deluxe edition of Backtracks in 2009.
- Even though "Sin City" appears to be performed at the Point Theatre in Dublin on 26 April 1991, as Brian Johnson says in the intro on the album, "We've got a song for you, Dublin", at the real Dublin show he actually said, "OK Dublin, we've got a song especially for you" (a bootleg recording of the show exists). The intro on the album is taken from the performance at King's Hall in Belfast on 27 April 1991 - Johnson mentioning Dublin is a genuine mistake. The performance itself was recorded at the NEC in Birmingham on 23 April 1991.
- The sound of the audience and guitar feedback at the very start of "Shoot to Thrill" is taken from the Donington performance where the previous track, "Thunderstruck", was recorded. The performance itself was recorded at the NEC in Birmingham on 23 April 1991.

=== Vinyl 2 LP "Collector's Edition" ===
Side one
No.	Title	Writer(s)	Length
1.	"Thunderstruck" (Donington Park, Leicestershire, England; 17 August 1991)	A. Young; M. Young	6:34
2.	"Shoot to Thrill" (NEC, Birmingham, England; 23 April 1991)	A. Young; M. Young; Johnson	5:21
3.	"Back in Black" (Donington Park, Leicestershire, England; 17 August 1991)	A. Young; M. Young; Johnson	4:28
4.	"Sin City" (NEC, Birmingham, England; 23 April 1991)	A. Young; M. Young; Scott	5:40
5.	"Who Made Who" (NEC, Birmingham, England; 23 April 1991)	A. Young; M. Young; Johnson	5:16
6.	"Fire Your Guns" (Donington Park, Leicestershire, England; 17 August 1991)	A. Young; M. Young	3:42

Side two
No.	Title	Writer(s)	Length
1.	"Jailbreak" (NEC, Birmingham, England; 23 April 1991)	A. Young; M. Young; Scott	14:40
2.	"The Jack" (Tushino Airfield, Moscow, Russia; 28 September 1991)	A. Young; M. Young; Scott	6:57
3.	"The Razors Edge" (NEC, Birmingham, England; 24 April 1991)	A. Young; M. Young	4:36
4.	"Dirty Deeds Done Dirt Cheap" (NEC, Birmingham, England; 23 April 1991)	A. Young; M. Young; Scott	5:03

Side three
No.	Title	Writer(s)	Length
1.	"Hells Bells" (Northlands Coliseum, Edmonton, AB, Canada; 21 June 1991)	A. Young; M. Young; Johnson	6:01
2.	"Heatseeker" (NEC, Birmingham, England; 23 April 1991)	A. Young; M. Young; Johnson	3:37
3.	"That's the Way I Wanna Rock 'n' Roll" (Roberts Stadium, Evansville, IN, USA, Monday, 26 November 1990)	A. Young; M. Young; Johnson	3:57
4.	"High Voltage" (Northlands Coliseum, Edmonton, AB, Canada; 21 June 1991)	A. Young; M. Young; Scott	10:32
5.	"You Shook Me All Night Long" (Donington Park, Leicestershire, England; 17 August 1991)	A. Young; M. Young; Johnson	3:54

Side four
No.	Title	Writer(s)	Length
1.	"Whole Lotta Rosie" (Tushino Airfield, Moscow, Russia; 28 September 1991)	A. Young; M. Young; Scott	4:30
2.	"Let There Be Rock" (S.E.C.C., Glasgow, Scotland; 20 April 1991)	A. Young; M. Young; Scott	12:17
3.	"Highway to Hell" (S.E.C.C., Glasgow, Scotland; 20 April 1991)	A. Young; M. Young; Scott	3:53
4.	"T.N.T." (NEC, Birmingham, England; 23 April 1991)	A. Young; M. Young; Scott	3:48
5.	"For Those About to Rock (We Salute You)" (Northlands Coliseum, Edmonton, AB, Canada; 22 June 1991)	A. Young; M. Young; Johnson	7:09

- "Moneytalks" and "Are You Ready" were excluded from the vinyl set.

== Personnel ==
- Brian Johnson – lead vocals
- Angus Young – lead guitar, backing vocals on "T.N.T." and "Dirty Deeds Done Dirt Cheap"
- Malcolm Young – rhythm guitar, backing vocals
- Cliff Williams – bass, backing vocals
- Chris Slade – drums, percussion

== Charts ==
=== Weekly charts ===
==== Original version ====
Chart (1992–2019)	Peak position
Australian Albums (ARIA)	1
Dutch Albums (Album Top 100)	26
Finnish Albums (Suomen virallinen lista)	2
French Albums (SNEP)	29
Hungarian Albums (MAHASZ)	33
Japanese Albums (Oricon)	105
New Zealand Albums (RMNZ)	9
Norwegian Albums (VG-lista)	10
Portuguese Albums (AFP)	24
Spanish Albums (Promusicae)	70
Swedish Albums (Sverigetopplistan)	25
Swiss Albums (Schweizer Hitparade)	10
German Albums (Offizielle Top 100)	15
UK Albums (Official Charts)	5
US Billboard 200	15

==== Collector's Edition ====
Chart (1992)	Peak position
Australian Albums (ARIA)	44
Austrian Albums (Ö3 Austria)	7
French Albums (SNEP)	155
German Albums (Offizielle Top 100)	5
Swedish Albums (Sverigetopplistan)	9
Swiss Albums (Schweizer Hitparade)	5
US Billboard 200	34

== Certifications ==
Region	Certification	Certified units/sales
Australia (ARIA)	8× Platinum	560,000^{^}
Austria (IFPI Austria) (Collector's Edition)	Gold	25,000^{*}
Canada (Music Canada)	3× Platinum	300,000^{‡}
Finland (Musiikkituottajat)	Gold	30,852
France (SNEP)	2× Platinum	600,000^{*}
Germany (BVMI)	Gold	250,000^{^}
Italy (FIMI)	Gold	25,000^{*}
New Zealand (RMNZ) (Collector's Edition)	Platinum	15,000^{^}
Spain (Promusicae)	Platinum	100,000^{^}
Switzerland (IFPI Switzerland)	Platinum	50,000^{^}
United Kingdom (BPI)	Gold	100,000^{^}
United States (RIAA)	4× Platinum	4,000,000^{‡}
United States (RIAA) (Collector's Edition)	4× Platinum	4,000,000^{‡}
^{*} Sales figures based on certification alone.^{^} Shipments figures based on certification alone.^{‡} Sales+streaming figures based on certification alone.

== See also ==
- Live at Donington (AC/DC)
- Plug Me In
- Backtracks
