= One Last Time Live in Concert =

Video by Tina Turner
- Released: February 6, 2001
- Recorded: July 15–16, 2000
- Venue: Wembley Stadium (London)
- Genre: Rock
- Length: 120 Minutes
- Director: David Mallet

Tina Turner chronology
Celebrate! – 60th Birthday Special (1999)	One Last Time Live in Concert (2001)	All the Best – The Live Collection (2005)

One Last Time Live in Concert is a documentary of one of singer Tina Turner's final Wembley Stadium concert stops on her Twenty Four Seven Tour. It was directed by David Mallet. The DVD was released in 2001, a year after the tour, which was the highest-grossing tour of 2000, ended.

== Setlist ==
1. I Want To Take You Higher
2. Absolutely Nothing's Changed
3. A Fool in Love
4. Acid Queen
5. River Deep Mountain High
6. We Don't Need Another Hero
7. Better Be Good to Me
8. Private Dancer
9. Let's Stay Together
10. What's Love Got To Do With It?
11. When the Heartache Is Over
12. Baby, I'm a Star (Lisa Fischer and Stacey Campbell)
13. Help!
14. Whatever You Need
15. Sitting on the Dock of the Bay
16. Try a Little Tenderness
17. I Heard It Through the Grapevine
18. Addicted to Love
19. The Best
20. Proud Mary
21. Nutbush City Limits
22. Twenty Four Seven

== Certifications ==
Region	Certification	Certified units/sales
Australia (ARIA)	Platinum	15,000^{^}
Canada (Music Canada)	Platinum	10,000^{^}
Germany (BVMI)	Gold	25,000^{^}
United Kingdom (BPI)	Platinum	50,000^{^}
United States (RIAA)	Platinum	100,000^{^}
^{^} Shipments figures based on certification alone.

== Other features ==
- Backstage with Tina (including interviews)
- Select a Track
- Photo gallery
