= That's the Way I Wanna Rock 'n' Roll =

1988 single by AC/DC

Single by AC/DC

from the album Blow Up Your Video
- B-side: "Kissin' Dynamite" "Borrowed Time" (12" maxi)
- Released: 21 March 1988
- Recorded: 1987
- Genre: Hard rock, blues rock
- Length: 3:45
- Label: Atlantic
- Songwriters: Angus Young; Malcolm Young; Brian Johnson
- Producers: Harry Vanda; George Young

AC/DC singles chronology
| "Heatseeker" (1988) | "That's the Way I Wanna Rock 'n' Roll" (1988) | "Thunderstruck" (1990) |

Music video
- "That's the Way I Wanna Rock 'n' Roll" on YouTube

"That's the Way I Wanna Rock 'n' Roll" is a single by Australian hard rock band AC/DC. The song appeared on their 1988 album Blow Up Your Video as the second track. A live version of this song can be found on the band's live album, Live: 2 CD Collector's Edition. The B-side of the single was "Borrowed Time".

In 2005, the music video, directed by Peter Sinclair, Brian Grant, and Jiff Morrison, was released on Family Jewels. The video was shot at their show at the National Exhibition Centre in Birmingham and included fans carrying red cardboard Gibson SG guitars.

Author Paul Stenning described the song as the strongest from the album.

== 7" vinyl track listing ==
All tracks are written by Malcolm Young, Angus Young and Brian Johnson.

Side A
| No. | Title | Length |
|---|---|---|
| 1. | "That's The Way I Wanna Rock 'n' Roll" | 3:46 |

Side B
| No. | Title | Length |
|---|---|---|
| 2. | "Kissin' Dynamite" | 4:00 |

== 12" Vinyl maxi-single track listing ==
All tracks are written by Malcolm Young, Angus Young and Brian Johnson.

Side A
| No. | Title | Length |
|---|---|---|
| 1. | "That's The Way I Wanna Rock 'n' Roll" | 3:46 |

Side B
| No. | Title | Length |
|---|---|---|
| 2. | "Kissin' Dynamite" | 4:00 |
| 3. | "Borrowed Time" | 3:45 |

== 5" CD single track listing ==
| No. | Title | Writers | Length |
|---|---|---|---|
| 1. | "That's The Way I Wanna Rock 'n' Roll" | Malcolm Young, Angus Young and Brian Johnson | 3:46 |
| 2. | "Kissin' Dynamite" | Malcolm Young, Angus Young and Brian Johnson | 4:00 |
| 3. | "Shoot To Thrill" | Malcolm Young, Angus Young and Brian Johnson | 5:14 |
| 4. | "Whole Lotta Rosie (Live)" | | 4:24 |

== Charts ==
| Chart (1988) | Peak position |
|---|---|
| Australian (Kent Music Report) | 68 |
| New Zealand (Recorded Music NZ) | 35 |
| UK Singles (Official Charts) | 22 |
| US Mainstream Rock Airplay (Billboard) | 28 |

== Personnel ==
- Brian Johnson – vocals
- Angus Young – lead guitar
- Malcolm Young – rhythm guitar, backing vocals
- Cliff Williams – bass guitar, backing vocals
- Simon Wright – drums
