= Tina Live =

Live album / Video by Tina Turner
- Released: September 28, 2009
- Recorded: March 21, 2009
- Venues: GelreDome (Arnhem, Netherlands)
- Genres: Soul; rock; pop
- Length: 125:54 (DVD); 74:50 (CD)
- Label: Parlophone

Tina Turner chronology
Tina! (2008)	Tina Live (2009)	Love Songs (2014)

Tina Turner video chronology
All the Best: The Live Collection (2005)	Tina Live (2009)

Tina Live is a live album and video album by Tina Turner, released on September 28, 2009, in Europe by Parlophone and on October 13, 2009, in the United States by Manhattan Records. The tracks were recorded at the GelreDome in Arnhem, Netherlands, on March 21, 2009, during Turner's 50th Anniversary Tour.

== Track listing ==
Disc One (CD)
No.	Title	Writer(s)	Length
1.	"Steamy Windows"	Tony Joe White	04:27
2.	"River Deep – Mountain High"	Phil Spector; Jeff Barry; Ellie Greenwich	03:54
3.	"What You Get Is What You See"	Terry Britten; Graham Lyle	04:03
4.	"Better Be Good to Me"	Holly Knight; Nicky Chinn; Mike Chapman	06:26
5.	"What's Love Got To Do With It"	Britten; Lyle	03:40
6.	"Private Dancer"	Mark Knopfler	06:30
7.	"We Don't Need Another Hero (Thunderdome)"	Britten; Lyle	05:11
8.	"Let's Stay Together"	Willie Mitchell; Al Green; Al Jackson Jr.	04:08
9.	"Jumpin' Jack Flash"	Mick Jagger; Keith Richards	01:48
10.	"It's Only Rock 'n Roll (But I Like It)" (Featuring Lisa Fischer)	Jagger; Richards	03:23
11.	"GoldenEye"	Bono; The Edge	04:08
12.	"Addicted To Love"	Robert Palmer	04:54
13.	"The Best"	Chapman; Knight	05:07
14.	"Proud Mary"	John Fogerty	09:52
15.	"Nutbush City Limits"	Tina Turner	07:35

Disc Two (DVD)
No.	Title	Length
1.	"Introduction Music" (Instrumental)	00:33
2.	"Steamy Windows"	04:27
3.	"Typical Male"	04:27
4.	"River Deep – Mountain High"	04:15
5.	"What You Get Is What You See"	04:03
6.	"Better Be Good To Me"	06:26
7.	"Ninja Chase" (Instrumental)	00:59
8.	"Acid Queen"	02:34
9.	"What's Love Got To Do With It"	03:40
10.	"What's Love Got To Do With It" (Reprise With Audience)	01:29
11.	"Private Dancer"	06:30
12.	"Weapons Sequence" (Instrumental)	01:15
13.	"We Don't Need Another Hero (Thunderdome)"	05:11
14.	"Help!"	05:36
15.	"Let's Stay Together"	04:08
16.	"Undercover Agent For The Blues"	04:10
17.	"I Can't Stand The Rain"	03:29
18.	"Jumpin' Jack Flash"	01:48
19.	"It's Only Rock 'N Roll (But I Like It)" (Featuring Lisa Fischer)	03:23
20.	"Flamenco/009 Encounter" (Instrumental)	01:31
21.	"GoldenEye"	04:08
22.	"Addicted To Love"	04:54
23.	"The Best"	05:07
24.	"Proud Mary"	09:52
25.	"Nutbush City Limits"	07:35
26.	"Be Tender With Me Baby"	06:06

== Charts ==
=== Weekly charts ===
2009 weekly chart performance for Tina Live
Chart (2009)	Peak position
Austrian Albums (Ö3 Austria)	8
Belgian Albums (Ultratop Flanders)	18
Belgian Albums (Ultratop Wallonia)	58
Croatian International Albums (HDU)	15
Czech Albums (ČNS IFPI)	11
Dutch Albums (Album Top 100)	3
French Albums (SNEP)	93
German Albums (Offizielle Top 100)	18
Italian Albums (FIMI)	76
Mexican Albums (Top 100 Mexico)	93
Portuguese Albums (AFP)	18
Scottish Albums (Official Charts)	45
Spanish Albums (Promusicae)	58
Swedish Albums (Sverigetopplistan)	59
Swiss Albums (Schweizer Hitparade)	58
UK Albums (Official Charts)	43
US Billboard 200	169
US Top R&B/Hip-Hop Albums (Billboard)	80

2018 weekly chart performance for Tina Live
Chart (2018)	Peak position
Polish Albums (ZPAV)	2

2023 weekly chart performance for Tina Live
Chart (2023)	Peak position
Swiss Albums (Schweizer Hitparade)	45

=== Year-end charts ===
Year-end chart performance for Tina Live
Chart (2009)	Position
Dutch Albums (Album Top 100)	79

== Certifications ==
Region	Certification	Certified units/sales
Poland (ZPAV)	Gold	10,000^{‡}
^{‡} Sales+streaming figures based on certification alone.
