= Moneytalks =

1990 single by AC/DC

- UK single cover

Single by AC/DC

from the album The Razors Edge
- B-side: "Down on the Borderline"
- Released: 12 November 1990
- Genre: Hard rock; Power pop
- Length: 3:45
- Label: Albert Productions
- Songwriters: Angus Young; Malcolm Young
- Producer: Bruce Fairbairn

AC/DC singles chronology
"Thunderstruck" (1990)	"Moneytalks" (1990)	"Are You Ready" (1991)

Music video
- "Moneytalks" on YouTube

"Moneytalks" is a song written by Malcolm and Angus Young and produced by Bruce Fairbairn for the Australian hard rock band AC/DC. It was released as the second single from the band's 12th studio album, The Razors Edge, on 12 November 1990. A live version of the song recorded on the band's 1990–1991 Razors Edge World Tour appears on AC/DC's 1992 live album, Live.

"Moneytalks" is one of AC/DC's biggest hits, entering the top 40 on the US Billboard Hot 100 (becoming the band's highest-charting single and third and final Top 40 hit), the UK Singles Chart, and the Australian ARIA Singles Chart. In Finland and New Zealand, it became a top-10 hit. During their subsequent world tour, thousands of "Angus Bucks" were dropped on the audience during the song. A music video of the song, directed by David Mallet, was also released, featuring a live performance during the tour. Despite its popularity, it has not been performed in concert by the band since the tour.

The B-side "Down on the Borderline" was recorded in 1987 during the sessions for their previous album, Blow Up Your Video.

== Personnel ==
- Brian Johnson – lead vocals
- Angus Young – lead guitar
- Malcolm Young – rhythm guitar, backing vocals
- Cliff Williams – bass guitar, backing vocals
- Chris Slade – drums

== Charts ==
=== Weekly charts ===
Chart (1990–1991)	Peak position
Australia (ARIA)	21
Belgium (Ultratop 50 Flanders)	26
Canada Top Singles (RPM)	12
Europe (Eurochart Hot 100)	94
Finland (Suomen virallinen lista)	7
Ireland (IRMA)	15
Netherlands (Dutch Top 40)	28
Netherlands (Single Top 100)	24
New Zealand (Recorded Music NZ)	9
UK Singles (Official Charts)	36
US Billboard Hot 100	23
US Mainstream Rock Airplay (Billboard)	3
US Cash Box Top 100	28

=== Year-end charts ===
Chart (1991)	Position
Canada Top Singles (RPM)	100
US Album Rock Tracks (Billboard)	15

== Certifications ==
Region	Certification	Certified units/sales
Canada (Music Canada)	Platinum	80,000^{‡}
^{‡} Sales+streaming figures based on certification alone.

== Release history ==
Region	Date	Format(s)	Label(s)	Ref.
United Kingdom	12 November 1990	7-inch vinyl; 12-inch vinyl; CD; cassette	ATCO	
Australia	19 November 1990	7-inch vinyl; 12-inch vinyl; CD; cassette	Albert Productions	
Japan	25 January 1991	Mini-CD	ATCO	
