= The Razors Edge (AC/DC album) =

1990 studio album by AC/DC

Studio album by AC/DC
- Released: 24 September 1990
- Recorded: 1990
- Studio: Little Mountain Sound (Vancouver)
- Genre: Hard rock
- Length: 46:29
- Labels: Albert/CBS; Atlantic; ATCO
- Producer: Bruce Fairbairn

AC/DC chronology
Blow Up Your Video (1988)	The Razors Edge (1990)	AC/DC Live (1992)

Singles from The Razors Edge
- 1. "Thunderstruck" Released: September 1990; 2. "Moneytalks" Released: 12 November 1990; 3. "Are You Ready" Released: 28 March 1991; 4. "Rock Your Heart Out" Released: 13 October 1991

The Razors Edge is the twelfth studio album by Australian rock band AC/DC. Released on 24 September 1990, through Albert Productions/CBS Records International in Australasia, Atlantic Records in Europe, and ATCO Records in North America, it was recorded in 1990 in Little Mountain Sound Studios in Vancouver, Canada, and was mixed and engineered by Mike Fraser and produced by Bruce Fairbairn. It was a major comeback for the band, featuring the hits "Thunderstruck", "Are You Ready" and "Moneytalks". This is the only studio album to feature Welsh drummer Chris Slade, who was the drummer for AC/DC from 1989 to his dismissal in 1994.

Critical commentary for the album was generally mixed, with Alex Henderson of AllMusic complimenting Brian Johnson and Angus Young, while John Mendelsohn from Rolling Stone criticises its similarity to the band's past works. The album reached number 2 on the US Billboard 200 and number 4 on the UK Albums Chart, a smash commercial success that returned the band to a peak equivalent to that of their late 1970s and early 1980s popularity. The album earned multi-platinum certifications in Australia, Canada, Germany, Switzerland and the US. To support The Razors Edge, the band undertook the Razors Edge World Tour, starting in November 1990.

== Background ==
In 1987, the band had recorded Blow Up Your Video (1988) with their original producers, Harry Vanda and George Young. It was a commercial success – the album reached number 2 in the UK, and Australia. The Blow Up Your Video World Tour began in February 1988 in Perth, Australia. Following live appearances across Europe, rhythm guitarist Malcolm Young announced that he was taking time off touring, principally to begin recovery from his alcoholism. Another member of the Young family, their nephew, Stevie Young, temporarily took Malcolm's place on rhythm guitar. In 1989, drummer Simon Wright left the group to work on American heavy metal band Dio's fifth studio album Lock Up the Wolves (1990); he was replaced by Welsh drummer Chris Slade. Brian Johnson was unavailable for several months while finalising his divorce, so the Young brothers wrote all the songs for future albums, a practice that continued for all subsequent releases through Power Up in 2020.

== Recording and composition ==
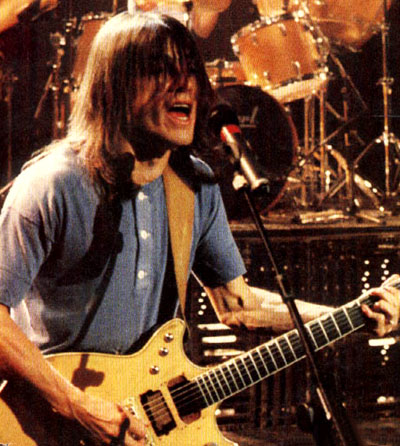
Malcolm Young in 1990

The Razors Edge was recorded at Little Mountain Sound Studios in Vancouver, Canada, and was mixed and engineered by Mike Fraser, produced by Bruce Fairbairn, who had previously worked with Aerosmith and Bon Jovi; and mastered by George Marino, at Sterling Sound in New York City. According to the book AC/DC: Maximum Rock & Roll, George Young was involved early on but had to bow out because of personal issues.

According to Guitar World, the opening riff to "Thunderstruck" features Angus Young alternating between fretted notes and playing the open string. In a 1993 interview with Alan di Perna, the guitarist recalls, "I was just fiddling with my left hand when I came up with that riff; I played it more by accident than anything. I thought, 'not bad,' and put it on a tape. That's how me and Malcolm generally work. We put our ideas down on tape and play them for one another." He expanded in greater detail in the liner notes of the 2003 re-release of The Razors Edge:

It started off from a little trick I had on guitar. I played it to Mal and he said "Oh, I've got a good rhythm idea that will sit well in the back." We built the song up from that. We fiddled about with it for a few months before everything fell into place. Lyrically, it was really just a case of finding a good title...We came up with this thunder thing and it seemed to have a good ring to it. AC/DC = Power. That's the basic idea.

"Moneytalks" is also one of AC/DC's biggest hits, peaking at number 23 on the Billboard Hot 100, number 36 on the UK Singles Chart, and number 21 on the Australian ARIA Singles Chart. It is still the band's highest-charting single in the United States, at number 23. During their subsequent world tour, thousands of Angus Bucks – a replica of an American $1 bill but with Angus pictured instead of George Washington – were dropped on the audience during the song. A music video of the song, directed by David Mallet, was also released, featuring a live performance during the tour.

Author Murray Engleheart states in his band memoir AC/DC: Maximum Rock & Roll: "On songs like 'Mistress for Christmas' and 'Moneytalks', Malcolm and Angus showed their working-class roots, despite multi-millionaire selling albums, by taking aim at the high flyers in the business world". In a February 1991 interview with Guitar World, Angus Young stated that the funniest song from the album was "Mistress for Christmas", and then said that the song was about Donald Trump. In the same interview, he declared that his best guitar solo on the album was on the title track, which also features a rare foray into finger picking.

== Release and reception ==
Professional ratings
Review scores
Source	Rating
AllMusic	3/5 stars
Collector's Guide to Heavy Metal	9/10
The Encyclopedia of Popular Music	3/5 stars
Entertainment Weekly	A−
Mojo	4/5 stars
Q	4/5 stars
Rolling Stone	2/5 stars
Select	4/5 medals
Uncut	7/10

Released on 24 September 1990, through Albert Productions/CBS Records in Australasia and Atlantic Records in Europe, The Razors Edge received generally mixed to positive reviews from critics. Alex Henderson of AllMusic complimented both the vocal performance by Brian Johnson and the guitar playing of Angus Young, and said that the album was "arguably [the band's] strongest album in over half a decade". Greg Sandow of Entertainment Weekly gave the album a very favourable review, saying that "this is one album that really delivers". Canadian journalist Martin Popoff defined the album "tight, highly strung and menacing... entirely worthy of its status as the grand comeback of legendary rock 'n' roll runts". John Mendelsohn of Rolling Stone, on the other hand, gave the album two out of five stars, criticising its similarity to past AC/DC works, and said that "with The Razors Edge, AC/DC sets a new record for the longest career without a single new idea". Mark Putterford of Select marked the album a four out of five, stating that "The Razors Edge comes on like an old friend you haven't seen for a couple of years".

The album was a major comeback for the band, featuring the singles "Thunderstruck" (September 1990); and "Are You Ready" (28 March 1991), which reached number 5 and number 16 respectively on Billboard's Mainstream Rock chart, and "Moneytalks" (12 November 1990), which peaked at number 23 on the Billboard Hot 100. Its fourth single, "Rock Your Heart Out" was released exclusively in Australasia on 13 October 1991. The album peaked at number 2 on the Billboard 200, and stayed on the chart for 77 consecutive weeks. It also reached number 4 on OCC's UK Albums Chart. The Razors Edge received certifications, including 8× Platinum in Canada, 6× Platinum in the US, 5× Platinum in Australia, 2× Platinum in Germany, and Switzerland, Platinum in Argentina, Austria, Finland, New Zealand, Spain, and Sweden, and Gold in France, Italy, and the UK. The album has sold approximately 18.8 million copies worldwide, making it the third highest selling AC/DC album after Back in Black and High Voltage.

To further promote The Razors Edge, the band undertook a world tour starting on 2 November 1990 and ending on 16 November 1991. Several shows on the Razors Edge World Tour were recorded for the 1992 live album titled AC/DC Live. The album was produced by Fairbairn, and is considered one of the best live albums of the 1990s, according to Berry Weber of AllMusic. The album was reissued on 25 March 2003 as part of the AC/DC Remasters series. It was also reissued on 19 November 2012 on iTunes, alongside their entire catalogue – excluding T.N.T. (1975) and the Australian versions of High Voltage (1975), Dirty Deeds Done Dirt Cheap (1976) and Let There Be Rock (1977). On 15 March 2024, the album was reissued on gold vinyl for their 50th anniversary, as part of the AC/DC 50 series.

== Track listing ==
All tracks are written by Angus Young and Malcolm Young.

The Razors Edge track listing
No.	Title	Length
1.	"Thunderstruck"	4:52
2.	"Fire Your Guns"	2:53
3.	"Moneytalks"	3:45
4.	"The Razors Edge"	4:22
5.	"Mistress for Christmas"	3:58
6.	"Rock Your Heart Out"	4:06
7.	"Are You Ready"	4:10
8.	"Got You by the Balls"	4:29
9.	"Shot of Love"	3:57
10.	"Let's Make It"	3:32
11.	"Goodbye & Good Riddance to Bad Luck"	3:14
12.	"If You Dare"	3:11
Total length:		46:29

== Personnel ==
Credits adapted from the album's liner notes.

AC/DC

- Brian Johnson – lead vocals
- Angus Young – lead guitar
- Malcolm Young – rhythm guitar, backing vocals
- Cliff Williams – bass guitar, backing vocals
- Chris Slade – drums

Production

- Bruce Fairbairn – producing
- Mike Fraser – engineering, mixing
- Ken Lomas – additional recording
- Ian Taylor – additional recording
- Brian Dobbs – engineering assistance
- Sean Leonard – engineering assistance
- George Marino – mastering

== Charts ==
=== Weekly charts ===
Weekly chart performance for The Razors Edge
Chart (1990–2024)	Peak position
Australian Albums (ARIA)	3
Austrian Albums (Ö3 Austria)	11
Canada Top Albums/CDs (RPM)	1
Dutch Albums (Album Top 100)	19
Finnish Albums (Suomen virallinen lista)	1
German Albums (Offizielle Top 100)	4
Hungarian Albums (MAHASZ)	16
Irish Albums (IFPI)	5
Italian Albums (FIMI)	79
Japanese Albums (Oricon)	35
New Zealand Albums (RMNZ)	2
Norwegian Albums (VG-lista)	2
Spanish Albums (Promusicae)	53
Swedish Albums (Sverigetopplistan)	5
Swiss Albums (Schweizer Hitparade)	2
UK Albums (OCC)	4
UK Rock & Metal Albums (Official Charts)	12
US Billboard 200	2

=== Year-end charts ===
Year-end chart performance for The Razors Edge
Chart (1990)	Position
Australian Albums (ARIA)	17
German Albums (Offizielle Top 100)	80
New Zealand Albums (RMNZ)	27
Swiss Albums (Schweizer Hitparade)	28

Chart (1991)	Position
Australian Albums (ARIA)	41
German Albums (Offizielle Top 100)	8
New Zealand Albums (RMNZ)	2
Swiss Albums (Schweizer Hitparade)	20
US Billboard 200	12

== Certifications ==
Region	Certification	Certified units/sales
Argentina (CAPIF) Spanish Version "El Filo de las Navajas"	Platinum	60,000^{^}
Australia (ARIA)	5× Platinum	350,000^{^}
Austria (IFPI Austria)	Platinum	50,000^{*}
Brazil (Pro-Música Brasil)	Gold	100,000^{‡}
Canada (Music Canada)	8× Platinum	800,000^{‡}
Finland (Musiikkituottajat)	Platinum	63,926
France (SNEP)	Gold	100,000^{*}
Germany (BVMI)	2× Platinum	1,000,000^{^}
Italy (FIMI) since 2009	Gold	25,000^{*}
New Zealand (RMNZ)	Platinum	15,000^{^}
Poland (ZPAV)	Platinum	20,000^{‡}
Spain (Promusicae)	Platinum	100,000^{^}
Sweden (GLF)	Platinum	100,000^{^}
Switzerland (IFPI Switzerland)	2× Platinum	100,000^{^}
United Kingdom (BPI)	Gold	100,000^{^}
United States (RIAA)	6× Platinum	6,000,000^{‡}
^{*} Sales figures based on certification alone.^{^} Shipments figures based on certification alone.^{‡} Sales+streaming figures based on certification alone.

== Release history ==
Release history for The Razors Edge
Region	Date	Format	Label	Ref.
Various	24 September 1990	CD; cassette; LP	Albert/CBS; Atlantic; ATCO	
Various	25 March 2003	CD; cassette; LP	Albert; Epic	
Various	19 November 2012	Digital download	Columbia	
Various	15 March 2024	LP	Albert; Columbia	
