= Heatseeker (song) =

1988 single by AC/DC

Single by AC/DC

from the album Blow Up Your Video
- B-side: "Go Zone"
- Released: 4 January 1988
- Studio: Miraval (Correns, France)
- Length: 3:50
- Label: Albert Productions; Atlantic
- Songwriters: Malcolm Young; Angus Young; Brian Johnson
- Producers: Harry Vanda; George Young

AC/DC singles chronology
"Who Made Who" (1986)	"Heatseeker" (1988)	"That's the Way I Wanna Rock 'n' Roll" (1988)

Music video
- "Heatseeker" on YouTube

"Heatseeker" is a song by Australian hard rock band AC/DC. The song was included on their 11th studio album, Blow Up Your Video (1988), as the opening track. The song was released as the album's lead single with "Go Zone" as the main B-side. The song reached No. 5 in Australia, No. 2 in Norway, and No. 1 in Finland. In the United Kingdom, it peaked at No. 12 on the UK singles chart, becoming AC/DC's biggest UK chart hit until "Highway to Hell" reached No. 4 in December 2013. The song was later on the band's 1993 Live album.

== Music video ==
In the music video, directed by David Mallet, Angus Young explodes from a life-sized television set. He throws his hat, and it lands on a switch, causing it to flip. A missile is launched, and on the screen is film footage of the Strategic Air Command in the 1950s, 1960s and 1970s. The missile reveals to be a cruise missile, and travels across the world, whereupon it finally crashes into the Opera House in Sydney, during an AC/DC concert. Angus explodes out of the giant missile's warhead and does a guitar solo and at the end, he heads back into the missile's nose cone and leaves.

== Track listing ==
All tracks are written by Malcolm Young, Angus Young and Brian Johnson.

No.	Title	Length
1.	"Heatseeker"	3:50
2.	"Go Zone"	4:25

12-inch vinyl and 3-inch CD
No.	Title	Length
3.	"Snake Eye"	3:15

== Personnel ==
- Brian Johnson – vocals
- Angus Young – lead guitar
- Malcolm Young – rhythm guitar, backing vocals
- Cliff Williams – bass guitar, backing vocals
- Simon Wright – drums

== Charts ==
Chart (1988)	Peak position
Australian (Australian Music Report)	5
Canada Top Singles (RPM)	75
Europe (European Hot 100 Singles)	38
Finland (Suomen virallinen lista)	1
Ireland (IRMA)	7
Netherlands (Single Top 100)	82
Norway (VG-lista)	2
New Zealand (Recorded Music NZ)	29
Sweden (Sverigetopplistan)	4
Switzerland (Schweizer Hitparade)	15
UK Singles (Official Charts)	12
US Mainstream Rock (Billboard)	20
West Germany (GfK)	26
