= Blow Up Your Video =

1988 studio album by AC/DC

Studio album by AC/DC
- Released: 1 February 1988
- Recorded: August – September 1987
- Studio: Miraval (Correns)
- Genre: Hard rock
- Length: 42:48
- Labels: Albert; Atlantic
- Producers: Harry Vanda; George Young

AC/DC chronology
Who Made Who (1986)	Blow Up Your Video (1988)	The Razors Edge (1990)

Singles from Blow Up Your Video
- 1. "Heatseeker" Released: 4 January 1988; 2. "That's the Way I Wanna Rock 'n' Roll" Released: 21 March 1988

Blow Up Your Video is the eleventh studio album by Australian hard rock band AC/DC, released on 1 February 1988. The album was re-released in 2003 as part of the AC/DC Remasters series.

== Recording ==
Writing sessions for Blow Up Your Video took place in London's Nomis Studio in July 1987, with the band convening at Studio Miraval in Le Val in Provence in the south of France in August and September with Harry Vanda and George Young, the production team behind the band's early albums. This was also the final studio album to feature drummer Simon Wright.

In a 2008 Rolling Stone cover story, George Young admitted to David Fricke that, during the Blow Up Your Video sessions, he realised his brother Malcolm, who had always been a heavy drinker, was in the grip of alcoholism: "I saw the signs. Malcolm had a problem. I said if he didn't get his act together, I was out of there. I don't recall it having any effect."

The band recorded 16 tracks during the sessions, including the unreleased songs "Let It Loose" and "Alright Tonight", as well as other versions of "Heatseeker", and "That's the Way I Wanna Rock 'n' Roll". Two additional songs, "Snake Eye" and "Borrowed Time", were recorded but not featured on the album. The song "Down on the Borderline" was recorded, but not released until 1990 as a B-side. All three of these songs were later included on Backtracks in 2009. Demo tracks for the songs "Let it Loose" and "Alright Tonight" were stolen and bootlegged, so they were omitted from the final album cut.

Blow Up Your Video is the last album to feature Brian Johnson as a lyricist/songwriter (all songs on subsequent albums were written by the Young brothers).

The title of the album was taken from a line in the song "That's The Way I Wanna Rock 'n' Roll". In 1988 Angus Young explained the title to MTV Australia: "We were probably a band that's best seen in a live situation and that's how the title came about... 'Cause everything's automatic these days. A kid can flick on the button on a TV, he's got a remote control and he can zoom through everything and get it coming in from all over the world. You can turn on your radio and get rock coming in from America. For us, the best thing as a band it was always we were great onstage."

== Tour ==
The band began a world tour in Perth on 1 February, playing 16 dates in Australia for the first time in seven years. The band played live four tracks from Blow Up Your Video on the tour: "Heatseeker", "That's the Way I Wanna Rock 'n' Roll", "Nick of Time" and "Go Zone".

On the eve of the North American leg of the tour (a long stretch that would run from May to November), Malcolm Young was unable to participate as he had to deal with a by-now problematic alcohol addiction. Unlike Angus, who had always been a teetotaller, Malcolm enjoyed drinking but in recent years it had escalated to the point where it began to affect performances. The band's former US agent Doug Thaler recalls seeing the band at one of the Monsters of Rock shows in 1984: "I'd gone into AC/DC's dressing room and had a scotch with Malcolm and Jonno [Brian Johnson] while Mötley Crüe played. When AC/DC went out to take the stage, Malcolm had clearly had too much to drink. And they were playing the song that Angus used to do his guitar solo and strip to, and Malcolm would just barely keep a steady rhythm—he couldn't even do that. And he fell into the drum kit, and I thought, 'Oh boy, this is not headed any place good.'"

By April 1988, Malcolm recognised he had a problem and, ever mindful of his former bandmate Bon Scott's premature passing (the previous AC/DC singer died of alcohol poisoning in London in 1980), he began attending AA meetings, confessing to VH1's Behind the Music in 2000, "My drinking overtook my whole thing. I felt like Dr. Jekyll and Mr. Hyde. I had a talk with Angus... I was letting people down... I wasn't brain-dead, but I was just physically and mentally screwed by the alcohol." Filling in for him was Malcolm and Angus' nephew, Stevie Young, although Malcolm was present on the rest of the tour and in the Blow Up Your Video promotional videos. Stevie would also step in for Malcolm in 2014 when it was disclosed that the guitarist was suffering from dementia.

After their last few albums underperformed commercially, this tour brought AC/DC back into the spotlight and their following album, The Razors Edge, proved to be a greater commercial success.

== Reception ==
Professional ratings
Review scores
Source	Rating
AllMusic	2.5/5 stars
Christgau's Record Guide	C+
The Collector's Guide to Heavy Metal	5/10
The Encyclopedia of Popular Music	2/5 stars
New Musical Express	5/10
The Philadelphia Inquirer	3/4 stars
Rolling Stone	3.5/5 stars

The album was the band's biggest-selling album of new material since For Those About to Rock We Salute You, being certified Platinum in the US. Blow Up Your Video reached No. 2 in the UK and No. 12 in the US. The album was nominated for the Grammy Award for Best Hard Rock/Metal Performance Vocal or Instrumental in 1989. In the original Rolling Stone review, Jim Farber wrote, "Fortunately, the Young brothers continue to come up with enough inspired riffs to make the tunnel vision justifiable. In fact, the riffs here add up to the band's catchiest work since its classic album Back in Black." Greg Prato of AllMusic called the album "unfocused" and "glutted with such throwaways as "Nick of Time"." Canadian journalist Martin Popoff found the album "frustrating" and the band "looking too deeply for a new enigmatic direction". Author Paul Stenning, however, described the album as, "the sound of a group remaining current but still defining the rock art form on their own terms."

Modern reviews are less enthusiastic, being more on the negative side. Classic Rock magazine describes the album in a very unappealing way, stating "Apart from those two songs it’s largely a slog through fairly pedestrian deep cuts. And that’s really the major difference between great AC/DC albums, and not-so great ones: the good ones are all killer, no filler, with every track a finely crafted morsel of hard-core rock’n’roll so tight and lethal it can’t be reasoned with, stacked two-sides high." Ultimate Classic Rock agrees, pointing out that while it has a couple good singles, "...for those momentary glimpses of excitement, there’s just not a lot there."

== Track listing ==
All tracks are written by Malcolm Young, Angus Young and Brian Johnson.

Side one
No.	Title	Length
1.	"Heatseeker"	3:50
2.	"That's the Way I Wanna Rock 'n' Roll"	3:45
3.	"Meanstreak"	4:08
4.	"Go Zone"	4:26
5.	"Kissin' Dynamite"	3:58

Side two
No.	Title	Length
6.	"Nick of Time"	4:16
7.	"Some Sin for Nuthin'"	4:11
8.	"Ruff Stuff"	4:28
9.	"Two's Up"	5:19
10.	"This Means War"	4:21
Total length:		42:48

- The additional songs "Snake Eye" and "Borrowed Time" were recorded but only released on the 12-inch single versions of "Heatseeker" and "That's the Way I Wanna Rock 'n' Roll", respectively. "Snake Eye" was also included on the 3-inch CD-single for "Heatseeker". The song "Down on the Borderline" was recorded, but not released until 1990, as the B-side of the Australian "Moneytalks" single in 7-inch, 12-inch and CD-single formats. All three of these songs were later released in 2009 on the Backtracks box set.

== Personnel ==
=== AC/DC ===
- Brian Johnson – lead vocals
- Angus Young – lead guitar
- Malcolm Young – rhythm guitar, backing vocals
- Cliff Williams – bass guitar, backing vocals
- Simon Wright – drums, percussion

=== Production ===
- Harry Vanda, George Young – producers
- Tom Swift – engineer
- Jean-Jacques Lemoine, Chuck Cavanagh – assistant engineers
- Roy Cicala – special assistance
- George Marino – mastering at Sterling Sound, New York
- Gered Mankowitz, George Bodnar – photography

== Charts ==
Chart performance for Blow Up Your Video
Chart (1988)	Peak position
Australian Albums (Kent Music Report)	2
Austrian Albums (Ö3 Austria)	15
Canada Top Albums/CDs (RPM)	3
Dutch Albums (Album Top 100)	26
Finnish Albums (Suomen virallinen lista)	1
German Albums (Offizielle Top 100)	4
New Zealand Albums (RMNZ)	4
Norwegian Albums (VG-lista)	3
Swedish Albums (Sverigetopplistan)	4
Swiss Albums (Schweizer Hitparade)	4
UK Albums (Official Charts)	2
US Billboard 200	12

== Certifications ==
Region	Certification	Certified units/sales
Australia (ARIA)	3× Platinum	210,000^{^}
Finland (Musiikkituottajat)	Gold	37,844
Germany (BVMI)	Gold	250,000^{^}
New Zealand (RMNZ)	Gold	7,500^{^}
Spain (Promusicae)	Gold	50,000^{^}
Switzerland (IFPI Switzerland)	Platinum	50,000^{^}
United Kingdom (BPI)	Gold	100,000^{^}
United States (RIAA)	Platinum	1,000,000^{^}
^{^} Shipments figures based on certification alone.
