= Highway to Hell (song) =

1979 single by AC/DC

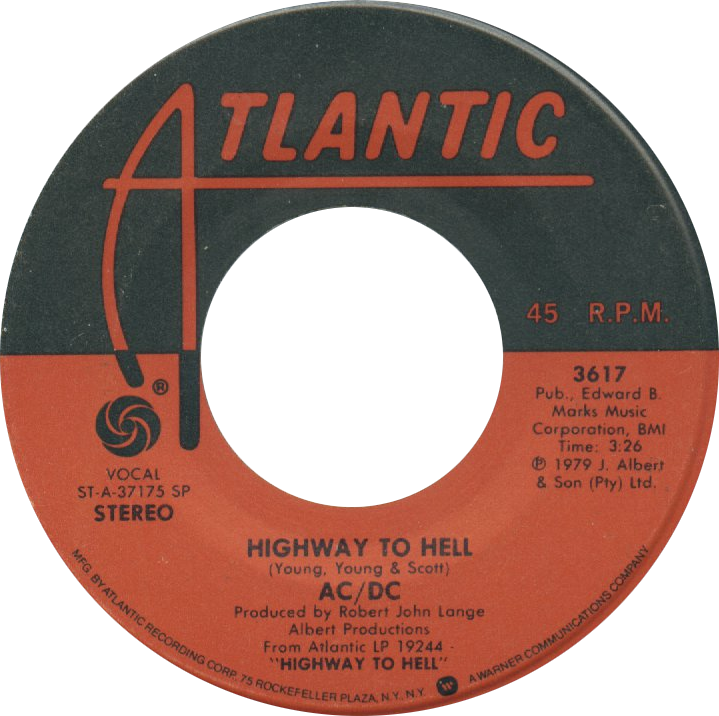
- One of side-A labels of the US single

Single by AC/DC

from the album Highway to Hell
- B-side: "If You Want Blood" (Aus/UK) "Night Prowler" (US)
- Released: 27 July 1979
- Recorded: March – April 1979
- Studio: Roundhouse (London)
- Genre: Hard rock
- Length: 3:27
- Label: Albert; Atlantic
- Songwriters: Bon Scott; Angus Young; Malcolm Young
- Producer: Robert John "Mutt" Lange

AC/DC singles chronology
"Rock 'n' Roll Damnation" (1978)	"Highway to Hell" (1979)	"Girls Got Rhythm" (1979)

Music video
- "Highway to Hell" on YouTube

"Highway to Hell" is a song by Australian rock band AC/DC. It is the opening track of their album Highway to Hell (1979), initially released as a single on 27 July 1979, the same day the album was released.

The song was written by Angus Young, Malcolm Young and Bon Scott, with Angus Young credited for writing the guitar riff. AC/DC had made several studio albums before and were constantly promoting them via a grueling tour schedule, referred to by Angus Young as being on a highway to hell, hence the name.

== Background ==
The song is in the key of A major. The title and lyrics reflect the arduous nature of touring constantly and life on the road. The highway that inspired the title, Canning Highway, connects the Perth Kwinana freeway to its port Fremantle and was home to many of Bon Scott's favourite pubs and hotels, including the Raffles Hotel.

"There were hundreds of riffs going down every day," recalled Malcolm Young. "But this one, we thought, 'That's good.' It just stuck out like a dog's balls."

Cashbox called it a "bone crunching, gut-wrenching exercise in primal guitar rock" with "simple yet effective riffing" and "ballsy vocals." Record World said that "Growling vocals join a raunchy guitar assualt [sic] for simple, high voltage, rock'n'roll abandon." The single spent 45 weeks on the German Singles Chart, peaked at #30 in its 19th week on the chart.

Bon Scott was found dead in the back of a friend's car, just over six months after the song was released.

== Production ==
"Highway to Hell" was produced by Mutt Lange as part of the album by the same name, and his work is regarded as a significant factor in delivering one of the classic AC/DC albums, the emergence of the double-guitar sound, which was later perfected on Back in Black, and improved backing vocals with Malcolm Young, joined by Cliff Williams for the first time.

== Legacy ==
"Highway to Hell" won the 'Most Played Australian Work Overseas' category at the 2009 APRA Awards. In 2013, an internet campaign attempted to get it to number one in the UK Christmas singles chart.

In January 2018, as part of Triple M's "Ozzest 100", the 'most Australian' songs of all time, "Highway to Hell" was ranked number 40.

It was the namesake for the JoJo's Bizarre Adventure Stand in the manga Stone Ocean.

In 2020, The Guardian ranked the song number seven on their list of the 40 greatest AC/DC songs, and in 2021, Kerrang ranked the song number five on their list of the 20 greatest AC/DC songs.

It was the theme song for the WWE's Summerslam 1998 PPV show, and it was used in a vignette highlighting the main event match between Stone Cold Steve Austin and The Undertaker for the WWF Championship.

In 2025, the song placed 31 in the Triple J Hottest 100 of Australian Songs.

=== Popular culture ===
The song has been used many times in popular culture, including in movies such as Little Nicky (2000), School of Rock (2003), Wild Hogs (2007), Percy Jackson & the Olympians: The Lightning Thief (2010), Iron Man 2 (2010) and Megamind (2010).

The song is also used in television shows such as The Simpsons, Glee, Family Guy, Supernatural and Blue Bloods.

In pro wrestling, the song was used as the theme song for SummerSlam (1998) by WWE mostly for Stone Cold Steve Austin vs. The Undertaker. And in Extreme Championship Wrestling, wrestler Matthew Hyson aka Spike Dudley used the song as his entrance music during his time in the company.

=== List of accolades ===
- Ranked No. 258 on Rolling Stone magazine's list of the 500 Greatest Songs of All Time.
- Ranked No. 152 on the 500 Greatest classic rock Songs compiled by 94.5 XKR.
- Ranked No. 23 on The Top 500 Heavy Metal Songs of All Time, a book by Martin Popoff.
- The song "Highway to Hell" is part of The Rock and Roll Hall of Fame's 500 Songs that Shaped Rock and Roll list.
- The master ringtone was certified Gold by the RIAA in June 2007 for sales in excess of 500,000.

== Personnel ==
AC/DC

- Bon Scott – lead vocals
- Angus Young – lead guitar
- Malcolm Young – rhythm guitar, backing vocals
- Cliff Williams – bass guitar, backing vocals
- Phil Rudd – drums

Additional personnel

- Robert John "Mutt" Lange – producer, backing vocals

== Charts ==
Chart (1979/80)	Peak position
Australian (Kent Music Report)	24
Austrian Singles Chart	52
Belgian Singles Chart	14
Dutch Singles Chart	17
French Singles Chart	23
German Singles Chart	30
Spanish Singles Chart	24
Swedish Singles Chart	36
UK Singles Chart	56
US Billboard 100	47

Chart (1992)	Peak position
Australia (ARIA)	29
Dutch Singles Chart	69
Irish Singles Chart	12
Swiss Singles Chart	37
US Billboard Mainstream Rock	1
Chart (2012)	Peak position
Scottish Singles Chart	36
UK Singles Chart	40
Billboard Hot Digital Songs	1
Chart (2013)	Peak position
UK Singles Chart	4
Irish Singles Chart	23
Scottish Singles Chart	36
Chart (2021)	Peak position
Global 200 (Billboard)	142
Chart (2022)	Peak position
Hungary (Single Top 40)	16
Chart (2025)	Peak position
US Hot Rock & Alternative Songs (Billboard)	17

== Certifications ==
Region	Certification	Certified units/sales
Brazil (Pro-Música Brasil)	2× Platinum	120,000^{‡}
Canada (Music Canada)	9× Platinum	720,000^{‡}
Denmark (IFPI Danmark)	Platinum	90,000^{‡}
Germany (BVMI)	3× Gold	900,000^{‡}
Italy (FIMI)	3× Platinum	300,000^{‡}
Mexico (AMPROFON)	2× Diamond+4× Platinum	840,000^{‡}
New Zealand (RMNZ)	6× Platinum	180,000^{‡}
Portugal (AFP)	2× Platinum	80,000^{‡}
Spain (Promusicae)	3× Platinum	180,000^{‡}
United Kingdom (BPI) since 2010	3× Platinum	1,800,000^{‡}
United States (RIAA) since 2003	6× Platinum	6,000,000^{‡}
Ringtone/Mastertone
United States (RIAA) mastertone, since 2003	Gold	500,000^{*}
^{*} Sales figures based on certification alone.^{‡} Sales+streaming figures based on certification alone.

== Live recordings ==
"Highway to Hell (live)"

Single by AC/DC

from the album AC/DC Live
- B-side: "Hells Bells (live)"
- Released: October 1992
- Recorded: 1991
- Genre: Hard rock; blues rock
- Length: 3:53
- Label: Atco
- Songwriters: Bon Scott; Angus Young; Malcolm Young
- Producer: Bruce Fairbairn

AC/DC singles chronology
"Are You Ready" (1991)	"Highway to Hell (live)" (1992)	"Dirty Deeds Done Dirt Cheap (live)" (1992)

Music video
- "Highway to Hell" (AC/DC Live) on YouTube

"Highway to Hell" has been performed multiple times in live concert. Including:

- AC/DC Live: This was also released as a single. A video for the single was also released, containing a montage of footage from the Live at Donington home video.
- Let There Be Rock: The Movie - Live in Paris
- Live at River Plate

== See also ==
- List of best-selling singles
