= Thunderstruck =

1990 single by AC/DC

Single by AC/DC

from the album The Razors Edge
- B-side: "Fire Your Guns"
- Released: 10 September 1990
- Genre: Hard rock
- Length: 4:52
- Label: Albert Productions; ATCO
- Songwriters: Angus Young; Malcolm Young
- Producer: Bruce Fairbairn

AC/DC singles chronology
"That's the Way I Wanna Rock 'n' Roll" (1988)	"Thunderstruck" (1990)	"Moneytalks" (1990)

Music video
- "Thunderstruck" on YouTube

"Thunderstruck" is a song by Australian hard rock band AC/DC, released as the lead single from their twelfth studio album The Razors Edge (1990). It peaked at No. 4 on the Australian ARIA Singles Chart, No. 1 in Finland, and No. 5 on the US Billboard Album Rock Tracks chart. In 2010, "Thunderstruck" topped Triple M Melbourne's Ultimate 500 Rock Countdown in Australia. It is one of the best-selling singles of all time with over 15 million units sold.

== Background ==
Angus Young stated in the liner notes of the 2003 re-release of The Razors Edge:

It started off from a little trick I had on guitar. I played it to Mal and he said "Oh, I've got a good rhythm idea that will sit well in the back." We built the song up from that. We fiddled about with it for a few months before everything fell into place. Lyrically, it was really just a case of finding a good title ... We came up with this thunder thing, based on our favourite childhood toy ThunderStreak, and it seemed to have a good ring to it. AC/DC = Power. That's the basic idea.

The song has sold over a million digital copies since it became available for digital download.

In January 2018, as part of Triple M's "Ozzest 100", the "most Australian" songs of all time, "Thunderstruck" was ranked No. 8.

== Critical reception ==
"Thunderstruck" is widely considered one of the band's best songs. In 2020, The Guardian ranked the song number eight on its list of the 40 greatest AC/DC songs, and in 2021, the British rock magazine Kerrang! ranked the song number six on its list of the 20 greatest AC/DC songs. In 2025 the song was voted 13 in the Triple J Hottest 100 of Australian Songs.

== Music video ==
The video which accompanied the single, directed by David Mallet, was filmed at London's Brixton Academy on 17 August 1990. The audience members were given free T-shirts with the words "AC/DC – I was Thunderstruck" on the front and the date on the back, and these T-shirts were worn by the entire audience throughout the filming of the video.

== Track listings ==
- Single-CD: ATCO Records / 7567-96427-2 XS Europe

Music By, Lyrics By – Angus Young, Malcolm Young

1. "Thunderstruck" – 4:55
2. "Fire Your Guns" – 2:55
3. "D.T." – 2:54
4. "Chase The Ace" – 3:01

== Personnel ==
- Brian Johnson – lead vocals
- Angus Young – lead guitar
- Malcolm Young – rhythm guitar, backing vocals
- Cliff Williams – bass guitar, backing vocals
- Chris Slade – drums, percussion

== Charts ==
=== Weekly charts ===
Chart (1990–2026)	Peak position
Australia (ARIA)	4
Austria (Ö3 Austria Top 40)	65
Belgium (Ultratop 50 Flanders)	4
Canada Top Singles (RPM)	20
Denmark (Tracklisten)	29
Europe (Eurochart Hot 100)	33
Finland (Suomen virallinen lista)	1
France (SNEP)	45
Germany (GfK)	21
Global 200 (Billboard)	104
Hungary (Single Top 40)	6
Ireland (IRMA)	5
Netherlands (Dutch Top 40)	6
Netherlands (Single Top 100)	3
New Zealand (Recorded Music NZ)	3
Spain (Promusicae)	3
Sweden (Sverigetopplistan)	8
Switzerland (Schweizer Hitparade)	22
UK Singles (Official Charts)	13
US Digital Song Sales (Billboard)	16
US Mainstream Rock (Billboard)	5
US Rock Digital Songs (Billboard)	4

=== Year-end charts ===
Chart (1990)	Position
Australia (ARIA)	43
Netherlands (Dutch Top 40)	45
Netherlands (Single Top 100)	47

Chart (1991)	Position
Belgium (Ultratop 50 Flanders)	85
Germany (Media Control)	49

Chart (2017)	Position
Hungary (Single Top 40)	87

Chart (2018)	Position
Hungary (Single Top 40)	98

Chart (2019)	Position
Hungary (Single Top 40)	55

Chart (2020)	Position
Hungary (Single Top 40)	51

Chart (2021)	Position
Global 200 (Billboard)	194
Hungary (Single Top 40)	54

Chart (2022)	Position
Global 200 (Billboard)	148
Hungary (Single Top 40)	45

Chart (2025)	Position
Global 200 (Billboard)	183

== Certifications ==
Region	Certification	Certified units/sales
Australia (ARIA)	10× Platinum	700,000^{‡}
Brazil (Pro-Música Brasil)	Platinum	60,000^{‡}
Canada (Music Canada)	Diamond	800,000^{‡}
Denmark (IFPI Danmark)	3× Platinum	270,000^{‡}
Germany (BVMI)	3× Gold	900,000^{‡}
Italy (FIMI)	3× Platinum	300,000^{‡}
Mexico (AMPROFON)	2× Diamond+2× Platinum	720,000^{‡}
New Zealand (RMNZ)	8× Platinum	240,000^{‡}
Portugal (AFP)	Platinum	40,000^{‡}
Spain (Promusicae)	3× Platinum	180,000^{‡}
United Kingdom (BPI)	4× Platinum	2,400,000^{‡}
United States (RIAA)	Diamond	10,000,000^{‡}
Ringtones
Canada (Music Canada)	Platinum	40,000^{*}
United States (RIAA)	Platinum	1,798,000
^{*} Sales figures based on certification alone.^{‡} Sales+streaming figures based on certification alone.

== Release history ==
Region	Date	Format(s)	Label(s)	Ref.
United Kingdom	10 September 1990	—N/a	ATCO	
Australia	17 September 1990	7-inch vinyl; cassette	Albert Productions	
Australia	1 October 1990	CD	Albert Productions	
Japan	10 October 1990	Mini-CD	ATCO; Albert Productions	

== Legacy ==
The track is a popular song to learn among beginning guitarists. Writing for WRKR in 2025, Joe Davita expressed resentment towards children who play the riff in music stores, such as Guitar Center. He said: "You've probably heard AC/DC's 'Thunderstruck' so many times that you change the station whenever it comes on the radio. Nothing against it, it's a monster song, but unless Angus Young is playing that riff, nobody needs to hear it, not even from you, kid who plays it pretty well." He included the song on his list of the "10 Worst Guitar Center Songs Ever".

The song was reportedly used as part of the payload of a computer virus which attacked the Iranian nuclear program in 2012. In an email sent to Finnish computer security expert, Mikko Hyppönen of F-Secure, one of the scientists involved in the nuclear program was quoted as saying:

...There was also some music playing randomly on several of the workstations during the middle of the night with the volume maxed out. I believe it was playing "Thunderstruck" by AC/DC.

In 2025, it was revealed that the US Department of Agriculture in Oregon was using drones playing the song to deter wolves from attacking livestock.

Rayne Leat, a niece of former Iron Maiden drummer Clive Burr, is a professional wrestler. She wrestles with a metalhead gimmick and her finishing move, a step-up knee strike to the head called Thunderstruck, is a reference to the song.

During the 2026 FIFA World Cup, "Thunderstruck" was the goal song for Australia.

There is a popular drinking game where participants listen to the song in a circle and drink every time the word "thunder" is sang. A 2024 study revealed "Thunderstruck" is the most popular rock drinking song on drinking playlists.

== See also ==
- List of best-selling singles
- List of best-selling singles in Australia
- List of highest-certified digital singles in the United States
