= Chris Slade =

Welsh rock drummer (born 1946)

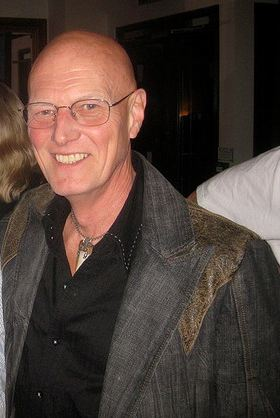
- Chris Slade in 2012

Background information
- Born: Christopher Slade Rees; 30 October 1946 (age 79); Pontypridd, Wales
- Origin: Cardiff, Wales
- Genres: Hard rock; heavy metal; blues rock; progressive rock; jazz fusion
- Occupation: Drummer
- Years active: 1964–2026
- Website: chrisslade.com

Chris Slade (born Christopher Slade Rees; 30 October 1946) is a Welsh retired drummer, who is perhaps best known for playing for Manfred Mann's Earth Band from its inception in 1971 to 1978 on eight albums, and AC/DC, for which he drummed from 1989 to 1994 and performed on the 1990 album The Razors Edge. He returned to AC/DC in February 2015 to replace Phil Rudd for the "Rock or Bust World Tour". Slade has also played with Tom Jones, Toomorrow, Uriah Heep, David Gilmour, The Firm, and Asia.

== Early life and career ==
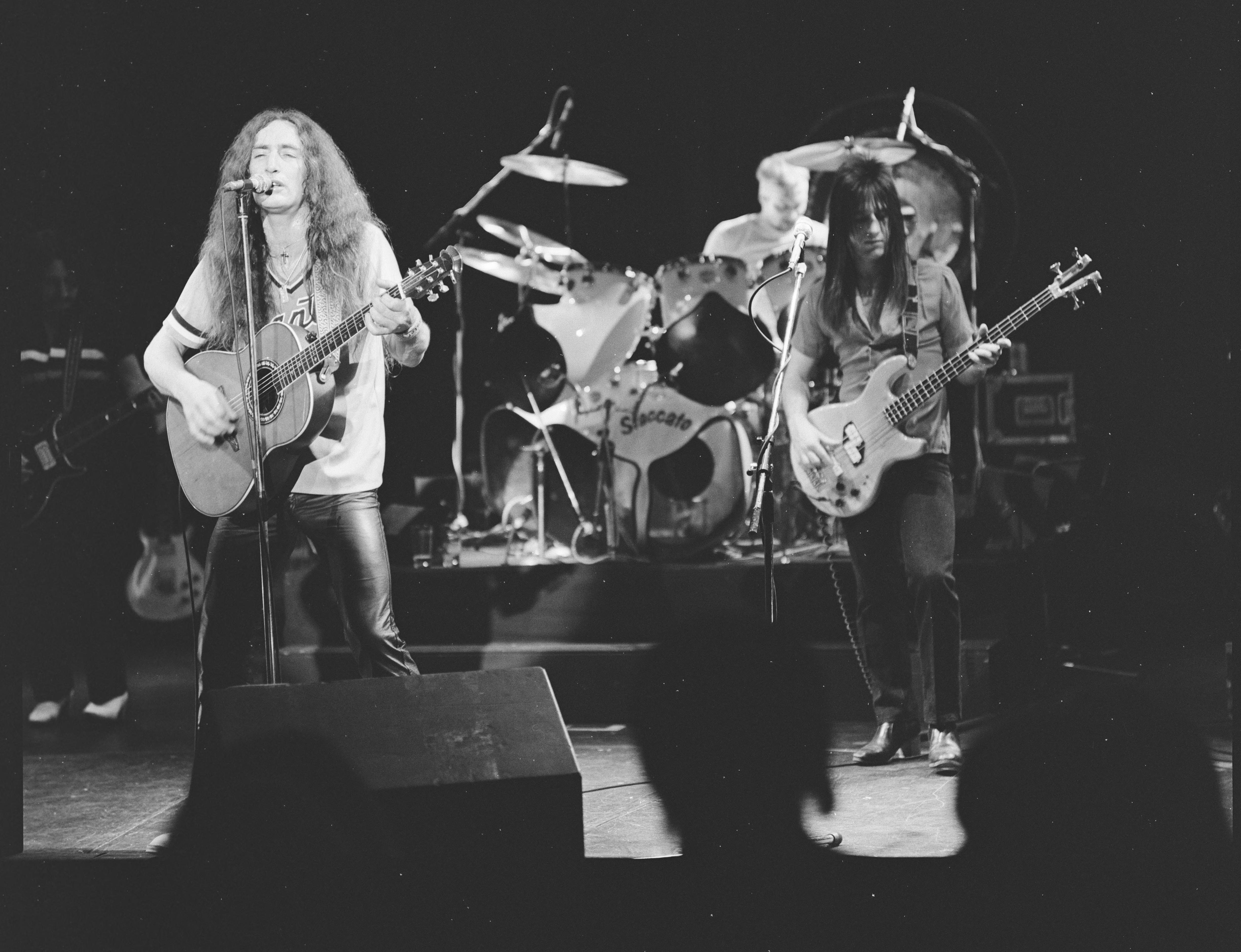
Slade (middle) with Uriah Heep in 1980.

Slade was born Christopher Rees in Pontypridd, Glamorgan, South Wales. He has worked with Gary Numan, Tom Jones, Olivia Newton-John (as co-members of the band Toomorrow), and Uriah Heep. Slade was an original founding member of Manfred Mann's Earth Band, playing on their eight studio albums released from 1972 to 1978.

In the mid-1980s Slade played with Paul Rodgers and Jimmy Page in The Firm. He has played with Pink Floyd's David Gilmour, and Gary Moore on his 1989 world tour.

Slade received his highest exposure in November 1989 when he was asked to join AC/DC after drummer Simon Wright had departed. AC/DC were signed to the same management company as Gary Moore, with whom Slade had just finished touring. The Young brothers (Angus and Malcolm) initially hired Slade only temporarily through management, then asked him–during the recording of the only album he made with them – to join the band. Slade played on The Razors Edge album in 1990 and the accompanying world tour, and the "Big Gun" single released in 1993. According to Slade, after working on demos for the following album, Ballbreaker, Malcolm Young called Slade and told him they wanted to try a reunion with former drummer Phil Rudd. Slade replied, "That's me out then, I'm gone." Young said that he wanted to keep Slade on hand if Rudd's return did not work out, but Slade refused. However he made statements that he still got on well with AC/DC and "it was an honour and a privilege to play with those guys".

After his departure, Slade spent a few years living in the UK countryside before receiving a call from Geoff Downes of the British progressive rock group Asia. Slade played with Asia for six years, before departing in September 2005.

Slade has fronted an AC/DC tribute band, Chris Slade Steel Circle, and is currently touring the World with THE CHRIS SLADE TIMELINE – a band formed to celebrate 50 years as a rock drummer. The band takes music from all aspects of his lengthy career and has appeared at major festivals including Hellfest, 24 Hours of Le Mans, Harley Davidson Aquitaine, and Saint Tropez, and is the only rock band to play the Moscow Olympic Stadium for the Kremlin Cup tennis tournament.

== Return to AC/DC ==
Speculation regarding Slade's return to AC/DC started shortly after Phil Rudd's legal troubles became public. In a December 2014 podcast by Chris Jericho, Jericho mentioned that he had it on good authority that Slade would be returning to AC/DC.

Slade was photographed signing albums with the band on 7 February 2015.

After the photo appeared publicly, Slade finally admitted that he was going to be the band's drummer and admitted to secrecy surrounding his return, and stated that it was done for the right reasons. The band issued a statement, "Chris Slade will be on drums for the upcoming Rock or Bust world tour".

Since that time, in addition to playing live, Slade has appeared in all promotional photos taken with the band and appeared in the music video for the single "Rock the Blues Away". In late April 2015 AC/DC's official website listed him as the band's drummer.

On 30 September 2020, his role within the band was made clear: Phil Rudd was returning to AC/DC on the drums, effectively making Slade leave the band for a second time. In the same announcement, Brian Johnson and Cliff Williams were also returning to the band.

== Retirement ==
On August 22, 2026, in a video message released via social media, Slade announced his retirement from drumming, explaining that a stroke that he suffered seven years prior had affected his ability to perform.

== Equipment ==
Slade endorses Drum Workshop drums, pedals and hardware, Paiste cymbals, Remo drumheads, LP percussion and London drumsticks. Before switching to DW, he previously endorsed various other companies, most notably Pearl drums, pedals and hardware. Additionally, he was also known for being one of the first users of Staccato drums in the late 1970s.

== Discography ==
=== With Tom Jones ===
- Along Came Jones (1965)
- A-Tom-ic Jones (1966)
- From The Heart (1966)
- Green, Green Grass of Home (1967)
- Live: at the Talk of the Town (1967)
- 13 Smash Hits (1967)
- Delilah (1968)
- Tom Jones Live in Las Vegas (1969)

=== With Toomorrow ===
- Toomorrow (1970)

=== With Tom Paxton ===
- How Come The Sun (1971)

=== With Manfred Mann's Earth Band ===
- Manfred Mann's Earth Band (1972)
- Glorified Magnified (1972)
- Messin' (1973)
- Solar Fire (1973)
- The Good Earth (1974)
- Nightingales & Bombers (1975)
- The Roaring Silence (1976)
- Watch (1978)

=== With Terra Nova ===
- Terra Nova (1980)

=== With Kai Olsson ===
- Crazy Love (1979)

=== With Frankie Miller ===
- Falling in Love (1979)

=== With Uriah Heep ===
- Conquest (1980)

=== With Gary Numan ===
- I, Assassin (1982)

=== With Denny Laine ===
- Anyone Can Fly (1982)

=== With David Gilmour ===
- David Gilmour Live 1984 (1984)

=== With The Firm ===
- The Firm (1985)
- Mean Business (1986)

=== With AC/DC ===
- The Razors Edge (1990)
- Live at Donington (1992)
- AC/DC Live (1992)
- "Big Gun" (1993)

=== With Asia ===
- Aura (2001)
- Silent Nation (2004)

=== With Bloodstock ===
- Creator of Worlds

=== With Damage Control ===
- Damage Control (2007)
- Raw (2008)

=== With MIWA ===
- My Wish Is Your Command (2011)
- Reach Out and Touch Me (2018)
