= AC/DC discography =

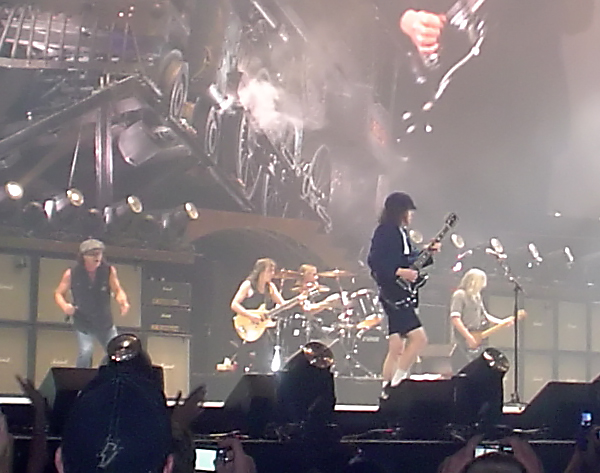
- AC/DC performing in Tacoma, Washington in 2009
- Studio albums: 17
- Extended plays: 1
- Soundtrack albums: 2
- Live albums: 3
- Singles: 57
- Video albums: 11
- Music videos: 52
- Box sets: 2

Australian rock band AC/DC have released 17 studio albums, two soundtrack albums, three live albums, one extended play, 57 singles, 11 video albums, 52 music videos and two box sets. Although many AC/DC singles have been released, the band refused to issue any greatest hits albums. Who Made Who, which served as the soundtrack to Stephen King's film Maximum Overdrive, Iron Man 2 and the band's various live recordings are the closest they have issued to such a compilation.

Brothers Angus (lead guitar) and Malcolm Young (rhythm guitar) formed AC/DC in 1973. The band released two albums in Australasia before issuing their first international album, High Voltage in 1976; the Youngs had been joined by vocalist Bon Scott, bass guitarist Mark Evans and drummer Phil Rudd. In 1980, less than a year after the appearance of the successful Highway to Hell, Scott died and was replaced by English singer Brian Johnson, with whom AC/DC released their best-selling album, Back in Black. The album Black Ice, from 2008, reached number one in 29 countries. In 50 years of their career, AC/DC have sold over 200 million albums worldwide, and 83 million in the United States. Back in Black sold 50 million copies worldwide, and became the second best-selling album in history.

Verizon made AC/DC albums available for digital download in 2007; for five years the band refused to release their albums via iTunes, as that company allows downloading of individual tracks. Angus Young observed, "We honestly believe the songs on any of our albums belong together. If we were on iTunes, we know a certain percentage of people would only download two or three songs from the album – and we don't think that represents us musically." However, in November 2012, the band relented and released their entire discography via iTunes. On 30 June 2015, their catalogue appeared on Spotify for the first time, which made their works available for streaming. Their most certified singles in the US are "Thunderstruck" (1990), "Back in Black" (1980), "Highway to Hell" (1979), and "You Shook Me All Night Long" (1980) – each have received Diamond, 7× Platinum, and 6× Platinum and from the Recording Industry Association of America (RIAA) in 2024, respectively. In Australia, "Thunderstruck" was accredited 10× Platinum by the Australian Recording Industry Association (ARIA) in 2022.

== Albums ==
=== Studio albums ===
List of studio albums, with selected details, selected chart positions, sales figures and certifications
Title	Details	Peak chart positions										Sales	Certifications
Title	Details	AUS	AUT	CAN	FRA	GER	NZ	SWE	SWI	UK	US	Sales	Certifications
High Voltage (Australasia)	Released: 17 February 1975; Labels: Albert/EMI (APLP009); Formats: LP, cassette	14	—	—	—	—	—	—	—	—	—		ARIA: 5× Platinum
T.N.T. (Australasia)	Released: 1 December 1975; Labels: Albert/EMI (APLPA016); Formats: LP, cassette	2	—	—	—	—	35	—	—	—	—		ARIA: 9× Platinum
High Voltage (international)	Released: 14 May 1976; Labels: Atco/Atlantic (36-142), Atlantic/WEA/Negram (50257); Formats: LP	13	—	69	7	12	—	58	18	— (Note: High Voltage did not enter UK Albums Chart but peaked at number 10 on the UK Rock & Metal Albums Chart.)	146		SNEP: Gold; IFPI SWI: Platinum; BPI: Gold; RIAA: 4× Platinum
Dirty Deeds Done Dirt Cheap	Released: 20 September 1976; Labels: Albert/EMI (APLP020), Atlantic/WEA/Negram (50323); Formats: LP, cassette	5	—	95	15	19	20	50	25	— (Note: Dirty Deeds Done Dirt Cheap did not enter UK Albums Chart but peaked at number 13 on the UK Rock & Metal Albums Chart.)	3		ARIA: 6× Platinum; BVMI: Platinum; RMNZ: Gold; IFPI SWI: Gold; BPI: Gold; RIAA: 7× Platinum
Let There Be Rock	Released: 21 March 1977; Labels: Albert/EMI (APLP.022), Atco/Atlantic (36-151), Atco/WEA (50366); Formats: LP, cassette	19	—	84	9	40	42	29	12	17	154		ARIA: 5× Platinum; SNEP: Gold; BVMI: Platinum; BPI: Gold; RIAA: 2× Platinum
Powerage	Released: 5 May 1978; Formats: LP, cassette	22	—	—	10	26	—	19	11	23	133		ARIA: 3× Platinum; SNEP: Gold; BVMI: Gold; IFPI SWI: Gold; BPI: Gold; RIAA: Platinum
Highway to Hell	Released: 27 July 1979; Labels: Albert/EMI (APLP.040), Atlantic (19244), Atlantic/WEA (50628); Formats: LP, cassette	13	38	40	2	2	46	24	7	8	17		ARIA: 5× Platinum; IFPI AUT: Gold; MC: 2× Platinum; SNEP: Platinum; BVMI: Platinum; IFPI SWI: Platinum; BPI: Platinum; RIAA: 8× Platinum
Back in Black	Released: 25 July 1980; Labels: Albert/EMI (APLP046), Atlantic (16018), Atlantic/WEA 50735; Formats: LP, cassette	1	6	1	1	1	24	12	1	1	4	AUS: 920,000 (Note: Sales as of January 2013)	ARIA: 12× Platinum; IFPI AUT: Platinum; MC: Diamond; SNEP: 2× Platinum; BVMI: 2× Platinum; RMNZ: Platinum; IFPI SWI: 2× Platinum; BPI: 3× Platinum; RIAA: 27× Platinum
For Those About to Rock We Salute You	Released: 20 November 1981; Labels: Albert/EMI (APLP053), Atlantic (11111), Atlantic/WEA (50851); Formats: LP, cassette	3	7	4	1	2	6	9	10	3	1		ARIA: 5× Platinum; IFPI AUT: Gold; SNEP: Platinum; BVMI: Platinum; IFPI SWI: Platinum; BPI: Gold; RIAA: 4× Platinum
Flick of the Switch	Released: 19 August 1983; Label: Albert/EMI (APLP061), Atlantic (80100), Atlantic/WEA (78-0100-1); Formats: LP	3	9	12	5	6	8	8	11	4	15		ARIA: 3× Platinum; SNEP: Gold; BVMI: Gold; BPI: Gold; RIAA: Platinum
Fly on the Wall	Released: 1 July 1985; Labels: Albert/EMI (APLP066), Atlantic (81263), Atlantic/WEA (781263-1); Formats: LP, cassette	4	24	30	19	14	22	10	19	7	32		ARIA: 3× Platinum; BVMI: Gold; IFPI SWI: Gold; BPI: Silver; RIAA: Platinum
Blow Up Your Video	Released: 1 February 1988; Labels: Albert/EMI (APLP431072), Atlantic (81828), Atlantic/WEA (781828-1); Formats: CD, cassette, LP	2	15	14	21	4	3	4	4	2	12		ARIA: 3× Platinum; BVMI: Gold; RMNZ: Gold; IFPI SWI: Platinum; BPI: Gold; RIAA: Platinum
The Razors Edge	Released: 24 September 1990; Labels: Albert/CBS (467262 2, 467462 1), Atlantic/Atco (91413-2), Atlantic/WEA; Formats: CD, LP, cassette	3	11	1	5	4	2	5	2	4	2		ARIA: 5× Platinum; IFPI AUT: Platinum; MC: 5× Platinum; SNEP: Gold; BVMI: 2× Platinum; RMNZ: Platinum; IFPI SWE: Platinum; IFPI SWI: 2× Platinum; BPI: Gold; RIAA: 6× Platinum
Ballbreaker	Released: 25 September 1995; Labels: Albert/EMI (477099-2), Atco (7559-61780-2), East West (61780); Formats: CD, LP, cassette	1	2	4	2	4	2	1	1	6	4		ARIA: 3× Platinum; IFPI AUT: Gold; SNEP: Platinum; BVMI: Gold; RMNZ: Platinum; IFPI SWE: Gold; IFPI SWI: Gold; BPI: Gold; RIAA: 2× Platinum
Stiff Upper Lip	Released: 28 February 2000; Labels: Albert/EMI (7243 525645 2 1), East West (62494-2), Elektra (7559-62494-2); Formats: CD, LP, cassette	3	1	5	2	1	12	1	2	12	7		ARIA: 3× Platinum; IFPI AUT: Gold; MC: Platinum; SNEP: 2× Gold; BVMI: 3× Gold; IFPI SWE: Gold; IFPI SWI: Platinum; BPI: Gold; RIAA: Platinum
Black Ice	Released: 17 October 2008; Label: Columbia (88697392382, 88697383771); Formats: CD, 2×LP	1	1	1	1	1	1	1	1	1	1	UK: 500,993 (Note: Sales as of November 2020)	ARIA: 5× Platinum; IFPI AUT: 3× Platinum; MC: 5× Platinum; SNEP: 2× Platinum; BVMI: 5× Platinum; RMNZ: 2× Platinum; IFPI SWE: 2× Platinum; IFPI SWI: 4× Platinum; BPI: Platinum; RIAA: 2× Platinum
Rock or Bust	Released: 28 November 2014; Labels: Albert/Columbia (88875034852); Formats: CD, LP, digital download	1	1	1	1	1	2	1	1	3	3		ARIA: Platinum; IFPI AUT: 2× Platinum; MC: Platinum; SNEP: 3× Platinum; BVMI: 3× Platinum; RMNZ: Gold; IFPI SWE: Platinum; IFPI SWI: Platinum; BPI: Platinum; RIAA: Gold
Power Up	Released: 13 November 2020; Label: Columbia; Formats: CD, LP, cassette, digital download, streaming	1	1	1	1	1	1	1	1	1	1	CAN: 38,000 (Note: Canadian sales for albums as of January 2021); WW: 1,400,000 (Note: Worldwide sales for albums as of March 2021)	ARIA: Gold; IFPI AUT: Platinum; SNEP: 2× Platinum; BVMI: 3× Gold; IFPI SWE: Gold; IFPI SWI: Platinum; BPI: Gold
"—" denotes a release that did not chart or was not issued in that region.

=== Live albums ===
List of live albums, with selected details, selected chart positions and certifications
Title	Details	Peak chart positions										Certifications
Title	Details	AUS	AUT	CAN	GER	NOR	NZ	SWE	SWI	UK	US	Certifications
If You Want Blood You've Got It	Released: 13 October 1978; Labels: Albert/EMI (APLP034), Atlantic (19212), Atlantic/WEA (50532); Formats: LP, cassette	37	—	10	73	—	—	—	29	13	113	ARIA: 3× Platinum; SNEP: Gold; BVMI: Platinum; IFPI SWI: Gold; BPI: Gold; RIAA: Platinum
AC/DC Live	Released: 26 October 1992; Labels: Albert/CBS (472675 2, 472652 2), Atco (92212-2, 92215-2, 6758034); Formats: 2×CD, CD, 2×LP, 2×cassette	1	21	1	15	10	9	25	10	5	15	ARIA: 9× Platinum; MC: Platinum; SNEP: 2× Platinum; BVMI: Gold; IFPI SWI: Gold; BPI: Gold; RIAA: 4× Platinum
Live at River Plate	Released: 19 November 2012; Labels: Columbia, J. Albert & Son (88765411752); Formats: 2×CD, 3×LP	11	3	13	57	6	23	13	4	14	66	ARIA: Gold; IFPI AUT: Gold; SNEP: Gold; BVMI: Gold; BPI: Gold
"—" denotes a release that did not chart or was not issued in that region.

=== Soundtrack albums ===
List of soundtrack albums, with selected details, selected chart positions and certifications
Title	Details	Peak chart positions										Certifications
Title	Details	AUS	AUT	CAN	FRA	GER	NZ	SWE	SWI	UK	US	Certifications
Who Made Who	Released: 20 May 1986; Labels: Albert/EMI (APLP431068), Atlantic (81650), Atlantic/WEA (781650-1); Formats: LP, cassette	4	28	12	30	24	24	21	21	11	33	ARIA: 5× Platinum; BVMI: Platinum; IFPI SWI: Gold; BPI: Gold; RIAA: 5× Platinum
Iron Man 2	Released: 16 April 2010; Label: Columbia, Sony (88697662142, 88697609522, 88697661581); Formats: CD, DVD, LP	2	1	1	—	1	1	1	1	1	4	ARIA: Platinum; IFPI AUT: Gold; SNEP: Gold; BVMI: Gold; RMNZ: Gold; IFPI SWE: Platinum; IFPI SWI: Platinum; BPI: 2× Platinum; RIAA: Gold
"—" denotes a release that did not chart or was not issued in that region.

=== Box set albums ===
List of box sets, with selected details, selected chart positions and certifications
Title	Details	Content	Peak chart positions								Certifications
Title	Details	Content	AUS	AUT	FRA	GER	SWE	SWI	UK	US	Certifications
Bonfire	Released: 17 November 1997; Labels: Albert/EMI (72438 23766 20), East West/WEA (7559-62162-2, 62119-2); Formats: 4×CD-box, 5×CD-box	Live from the Atlantic Studios; Let There Be Rock: The Movie – Live in Paris; Volts; Back in Black	21	—	56	71	60	—	—	90	RIAA: Platinum
Backtracks	Released: 10 November 2009; Labels: Albert (88697540992), Columbia; Formats: 3×CD/2×DVD/LP, 2×CD/DVD	Disc 1: Studio Rarities (CD); Disc 2: Live Rarities (CD); Disc 3: Live Rarities (CD); Family Jewels Disc Three (DVD); Live at the Circus Krone (DVD); Rarities (LP)	16	31	—	10	16	24	134	39	ARIA: Gold
"—" denotes a release that did not chart or was not issued in that region.

== Extended plays ==
List of extended plays, with selected chart positions and certifications
Title	Details	Peak chart positions				Certifications
Title	Details	DEN	FRA	SWI	US	Certifications
'74 Jailbreak	Released: 19 October 1984; Labels: Atlantic (80178), Atlantic-WEA/EMI Odeon (83836), Atlantic/EMI Odeon (604.7071); Formats: LP	4	24	58	76	RIAA: Platinum

== Singles ==
List of singles, with selected chart positions and certifications, showing year released and album name
Title	Year	Peak chart positions										Certifications	Album
Title	Year	AUS	CAN	GER	NLD	NZ	SWE	SWI	UK	US	US Main.	Certifications	Album
"Can I Sit Next to You, Girl"	1974	50	—	—	—	—	—	—	—	—	*		Non-album single
"Baby, Please Don't Go"	1975	10	—	—	—	—	—	—	—	—	*		High Voltage (1975)
"High Voltage"	1975	10	—	—	—	—	—	—	48	—	*		T.N.T.
"It's a Long Way to the Top (If You Wanna Rock 'n' Roll)"	1975	9	—	—	—	—	—	—	55	—	*	BPI: Gold; RIAA: Platinum; RMNZ: Platinum	T.N.T.
"T.N.T."	1976	19	—	—	—	—	—	—	—	—	*	BVMI: Gold; BPI: Platinum; RIAA: 3× Platinum; RMNZ: 3× Platinum	T.N.T.
"Jailbreak"	1976	19	—	—	—	—	—	—	—	—	33 (Note: Although the single was released before the chart existed, it eventually charted after the chart's creation.)		Dirty Deeds Done Dirt Cheap
"Dirty Deeds Done Dirt Cheap"	1976	29	—	—	—	34	—	—	47	—	4	RIAA: 2× Platinum; RMNZ: Platinum	Dirty Deeds Done Dirt Cheap
"Love at First Feel"	1977	63	—	—	—	—	—	—	—	—	*		Dirty Deeds Done Dirt Cheap
"Dog Eat Dog"	1977	60	—	—	—	—	—	—	—	—	*		Let There Be Rock
"Whole Lotta Rosie"	1977	—	—	—	5	—	—	—	36	—	*	BPI: Silver; RMNZ: Gold	Let There Be Rock
"Let There Be Rock"	1977	82	—	—	—	—	—	—	—	—	*		Let There Be Rock
"Problem Child"	1977	—	—	—	—	—	—	—	—	—	*		Dirty Deeds Done Dirt Cheap
"Rock 'n' Roll Damnation"	1978	83	—	—	18	—	—	—	24	—	*		Powerage
"Whole Lotta Rosie" (live)	1978	—	—	—	—	—	—	—	—	—	*		If You Want Blood You've Got It
"Highway to Hell"	1979	24	—	30	17	—	37	36	4 (Note: Although originally released in 1979, "Highway to Hell" did not chart in the UK until 2012. It achieved its peak position in 2013.)	47	29	BVMI: Platinum; BPI: 3× Platinum; RIAA: 6× Platinum; RMNZ: 6× Platinum	Highway to Hell
"Girls Got Rhythm"	1979	—	—	—	—	—	—	—	—	—	*		Highway to Hell
"Touch Too Much"	1980	—	—	13	—	—	—	—	29	106	*		Highway to Hell
"You Shook Me All Night Long"	1980	8	—	29	—	—	—	—	38	35	*	ARIA: 10× Platinum; BVMI: Gold; BPI: 2× Platinum; RIAA: 6× Platinum; RMNZ: 6× Platinum	Back in Black
"Hells Bells"	1980	7	—	25	—	—	—	61	—	—	50	BVMI: Gold; BPI: Gold; RIAA: 3× Platinum; RMNZ: 2× Platinum	Back in Black
"Rock and Roll Ain't Noise Pollution"	1980	7	—	—	—	—	—	—	15	—	*	RMNZ: Gold	Back in Black
"Back in Black"	1980	65	—	25	—	—	100	—	27	37	51	BVMI: Platinum; BPI: 3× Platinum; RIAA: 7× Platinum; RMNZ: 5× Platinum	Back in Black
"Let's Get It Up"	1982	73	9	33	—	—	18	—	13	44	9		For Those About to Rock We Salute You
"For Those About to Rock (We Salute You)"	1982	—	—	—	—	—	—	—	15	—	4	RMNZ: Gold	For Those About to Rock We Salute You
"Guns for Hire"	1983	—	—	—	—	—	—	—	37	84	37		Flick of the Switch
"Flick of the Switch"	1984	—	—	—	—	—	—	—	—	—	26		Flick of the Switch
"Nervous Shakedown"	1984	—	—	—	—	—	—	—	35	—	—		Flick of the Switch
"Danger"	1985	69	—	—	—	47	—	—	48	—	—		Fly on the Wall
"Sink The Pink"	1985	—	—	—	—	—	—	—	—	—	44		Fly on the Wall
"Shake Your Foundations"	1985	97	—	—	—	—	—	—	24	—	—		Fly on the Wall
"Who Made Who"	1986	9	—	—	—	35	—	—	16	—	23	RMNZ: Gold	Who Made Who
"Heatseeker"	1988	5	79	26	82	29	7	15	12	—	20		Blow Up Your Video
"That's the Way I Wanna Rock 'n' Roll"	1988	68	—	—	—	35	—	—	22	—	28		Blow Up Your Video
"Thunderstruck"	1990	4	20	21	3	3	80	16	13	—	5	ARIA: 10× Platinum; BVMI: Platinum; BPI: 4× Platinum; RIAA: Diamond; RMNZ: 8× Platinum	The Razors Edge
"Moneytalks"	1990	21	12	—	24	9	—	—	36	23	3	RMNZ: Gold	The Razors Edge
"Are You Ready"	1991	18	—	38	—	1	—	—	34	—	16	RMNZ: Gold	The Razors Edge
"Highway to Hell" (live)	1992	29	—	—	69	9	36	37	14	—	29		AC/DC Live
"Dirty Deeds Done Dirt Cheap" (live)	1993	112	—	—	—	34	—	—	68	—	—		AC/DC Live
"Big Gun"	1993	19	5	20	18	3	11	5	23	65	1		Last Action Hero: Music from the Original Motion Picture
"Hard as a Rock"	1995	14	—	25	—	16	19	28	33	—	1		Ballbreaker
"Hail Caesar"	1996	92	—	—	—	—	—	—	56	—	—		Ballbreaker
"Ballbreaker"	1996	—	—	—	—	—	—	—	—	—	25		Ballbreaker
"Cover You in Oil"	1996	—	83	—	—	—	—	—	85	—	9		Ballbreaker
"Dirty Eyes"	1997	—	83	—	—	—	—	—	85	—	9		Bonfire
"Stiff Upper Lip"	2000	—	—	—	—	—	—	—	65	115	1		Stiff Upper Lip
"Safe in New York City"	2000	—	—	—	—	—	—	—	—	—	21		Stiff Upper Lip
"Satellite Blues"	2001	23	—	—	—	—	—	—	—	—	7		Stiff Upper Lip
"Rock 'n' Roll Train"	2008	—	45	—	—	—	—	—	—	—	1	RMNZ: Gold	Black Ice
"Big Jack"	2008	—	83	—	—	—	—	—	—	—	10		Black Ice
"Anything Goes"	2009	—	—	—	—	—	—	—	—	—	34		Black Ice
"Money Made"	2009	—	—	—	—	—	—	—	—	—	—		Black Ice
"Shoot to Thrill" (live)	2011	—	—	—	—	—	—	—	98	—	—	BPI: Gold; RIAA: 2× Platinum; RMNZ: Platinum	Live at River Plate
"Play Ball"	2014	53	53	39	—	—	—	19	85	—	5		Rock or Bust
"Rock or Bust"	2014	—	—	47	—	—	—	55	—	—	8		Rock or Bust
"Rock the Blues Away"	2015	—	—	—	—	—	—	—	—	—	40		Rock or Bust
"Shot in the Dark"	2020	— (Note: "Shot in the Dark" did not enter the ARIA Singles Chart, but peaked at number 3 on the ARIA Digital Track Chart.)	50	79	—	6	—	19	— (Note: "Shot in the Dark" did not enter the UK Singles Chart, but peaked at number 30 on the UK Singles Sales Chart.)	116	1		Power Up
"Realize"	2020	—	—	—	—	—	—	—	— (Note: "Realize" did not enter the UK Singles Chart, but peaked at number 8 on the UK Rock & Metal Singles Chart.)	—	8		Power Up
"Demon Fire"	2020	—	—	—	—	—	—	—	— (Note: "Demon Fire" did not enter the UK Singles Chart, but peaked at number 30 on the UK Rock & Metal Singles Chart.)	—	— (Note: "Demon Fire" did not enter the US Mainstream Rock Chart, but peaked at number 9 on the US Hot Hard Rock Songs Chart.)		Power Up
"Witch's Spell"	2021	—	—	—	—	—	—	—	— (Note: "Witch's Spell" did not enter the UK Singles Chart, but peaked at number 35 on the UK Rock & Metal Singles Chart.)	—	—		Power Up
"Through the Mists of Time"	2021	—	—	—	—	—	—	—	— (Note: "Through the Mists of Time" did not enter the UK Singles Chart, but peaked at number 27 on the UK Singles Sales Chart.)	—	— (Note: "Through the Mists of Time" did not enter the US Mainstream Rock Chart, but peaked at number 11 on the US Hot Hard Rock Songs Chart.)		Power Up
"—" denotes a release that did not chart or was not issued in that region. "*" denotes the chart did not exist at that time.

== Videos ==
=== Video albums ===
List of videos, with details, selected chart positions and certifications
Title	Details	Peak chart positions							Certifications
Title	Details	AUS	FIN	GER	NZ	SWI	UK	US	Certifications
AC/DC: Let There Be Rock	Released: 1 September 1980; Labels: Warner Bros. (34073); Formats: VHS	—	5	—	—	—	—	—	BPI: Platinum
Fly on the Wall	Released: 1985; Labels: Atco Video/A*Vision Entertainment / EastWest (50102), Atlantic (50102 3, 05JL-50102); Formats: VHS, LaserDisc	—	—	—	—	—	—	—	
Who Made Who	Released: 1986; Labels: Atlantic (7567501143), Warner Bros. (7567 50114-3); Formats: VHS	—	—	—	—	—	—	—	RIAA: Gold
AC/DC (Australia only)	Released: 1989; Labels: Albert (VM 60057); Formats: VHS	—	—	—	—	—	—	—	ARIA: Platinum
Clipped	Released: 1 July 1991; Labels: Atco/Atlantic, Warner Bros. (8536 50234-3); Formats: VHS	—	—	—	—	—	—	—	
Live at Donington	Released: 26 October 1992; Labels: Albert, Atco (50346-6), EMI/Roadshow (15136), Epic, Sony (200474 2); Formats: VHS	1	2	44	—	—	69	—	ARIA: 7× Platinum; IFPI FIN: Gold; SNEP: 2× Platinum; BVMI: Platinum; RMNZ: Platinum; IFPI SWI: Platinum; BPI: 2× Platinum; RIAA: 6× Platinum
No Bull	Released: 19 November 1996; Labels: East West, Warner Bros. (8536 401992-3); Formats: VHS	1	1	35	1	—	—	—	ARIA: 6× Platinum; MC: 3× Platinum; BVMI: Gold; RMNZ: Platinum; BPI: Gold; RIAA: 5× Platinum
Stiff Upper Lip Live	Released: 19 November 2001; Labels: Elektra (40232), EastWest (8536402329, 8536402302, 8536402309); Formats: VHS, DVD	2	—	—	—	—	—	6	ARIA: Platinum; BPI: Gold; RIAA: Gold
Family Jewels	Released: 28 March 2005; Labels: Epic/Sony (58843), EPC (2028659); Formats: 2×DVD	1	1	7	1	13	10	1	ARIA: 10× Platinum; MC: 5× Platinum; IFPI FIN: Platinum; BVMI: 2× Platinum; RMNZ: 2× Platinum; IFPI SWI: 2× Platinum; BPI: 2× Platinum; RIAA: Diamond (10× Platinum)
Plug Me In	Released: 16 October 2007; Label: Columbia/Sony (88697104179); Formats: 2×DVD	1	1	3	1	34	40	1	ARIA: 7× Platinum; MC: 3× Platinum; IFPI FIN: Gold; RMNZ: 2× Platinum; IFPI SWI: Platinum; BPI: Platinum; RIAA: 5× Platinum
Live at River Plate	Released: 6 May 2011; Labels: Columbia/Sony; Formats: DVD, Blu-ray	1	1	1	1	—	8	1	ARIA: 5× Platinum; IFPI FIN: Gold; SNEP: Diamond; RMNZ: Gold; BPI: Platinum
"—" denotes a release that did not chart or was not issued in that region.

=== Music videos ===
List of music videos, showing year released and directors
Title	Year	Director(s)	Ref.
"Can I Sit Next to You, Girl"	1974	—N/a	
"High Voltage"	1975	Larry Larstead	
"T.N.T."	1976	—N/a	
"Dirty Deeds Done Dirt Cheap"	1976	—N/a	
"Let There Be Rock"	1977	—N/a	
"Dog Eat Dog"	1977	—N/a	
"It's a Long Way to the Top"	1977	Paul Drane	
"Jailbreak"	1977	Paul Drane	
"Rock 'n' Roll Damnation"	1978	—N/a	
"Highway to Hell"	1979	—N/a	
"Shot Down in Flames"	1979	—N/a	
"Walk All Over You"	1979	—N/a	
"Touch Too Much"	1979	—N/a	
"If You Want Blood (You've Got It)"	1979	—N/a	
"Back in Black"	1980	Eric Dionysius; Eric Mistler	
"Hells Bells"	1980	Eric Dionysius; Eric Mistler	
"Let Me Put My Love into You"	1980	Eric Dionysius; Eric Mistler	
"What Do You Do for Money Honey"	1980	Eric Dionysius; Eric Mistler	
"Rock and Roll Ain't Noise Pollution"	1980	Eric Dionysius; Eric Mistler	
"You Shook Me All Night Long"	1980	Eric Dionysius; Eric Mistler	
"Flick of the Switch"	1983	Paul Becher	
"Guns for Hire"	1983	Paul Becher	
"Nervous Shakedown"	1983	Paul Becher	
"Fly on the Wall"	1985	Brian Ward	
"Danger"	1985	Brian Ward	
"Stand Up"	1985	Brian Ward	
"Sink the Pink"	1985	Brian Ward	
"Shake Your Foundations"	1985	Brian Ward	
"Who Made Who"	1986	David Mallet	
"You Shook Me All Night Long"	1986	David Mallet	
"Heatseeker"	1988	David Mallet	
"That's the Way I Wanna Rock 'n' Roll"	1988	Brian Grant	
"Thunderstruck"	1990	David Mallet	
"Moneytalks"	1990	David Mallet	
"Are You Ready"	1991	David Mallet	
"Rock Your Heart Out"	1991	—N/a	
"Big Gun"	1993	David Mallet	
"Hard as a Rock"	1995	David Mallet	
"Cover You in Oil"	1995	David Mallet	
"Hail Caesar"	1996	David Mallet	
"Stiff Upper Lip"	2000	Andy Morahan	
"Safe in New York City"	2000	Andy Morahan	
"Satellite Blues"	2000	Andy Morahan	
"Rock 'n Roll Train"	2008	David Mallet	
"Anything Goes"	2009	David Mallet	
"Shoot to Thrill"	2010	David Mallet	
"Play Ball"	2014	David Mallet	
"Rock or Bust"	2014	David Mallet	
"Rock the Blues Away"	2015	David Mallet	
"Shot in the Dark"	2020	David Mallet	
"Demon Fire"	2020	Ben Ib	
"Realize"	2021	Clemens Habicht; Josh Cheuse	
"Witch's Spell"	2021	Wolf & Crow	
"Through the Mists of Time"	2021	Najeeb Tarazi	

== See also ==
- List of best-selling albums
- List of best-selling music artists
