= List of songs recorded by AC/DC =

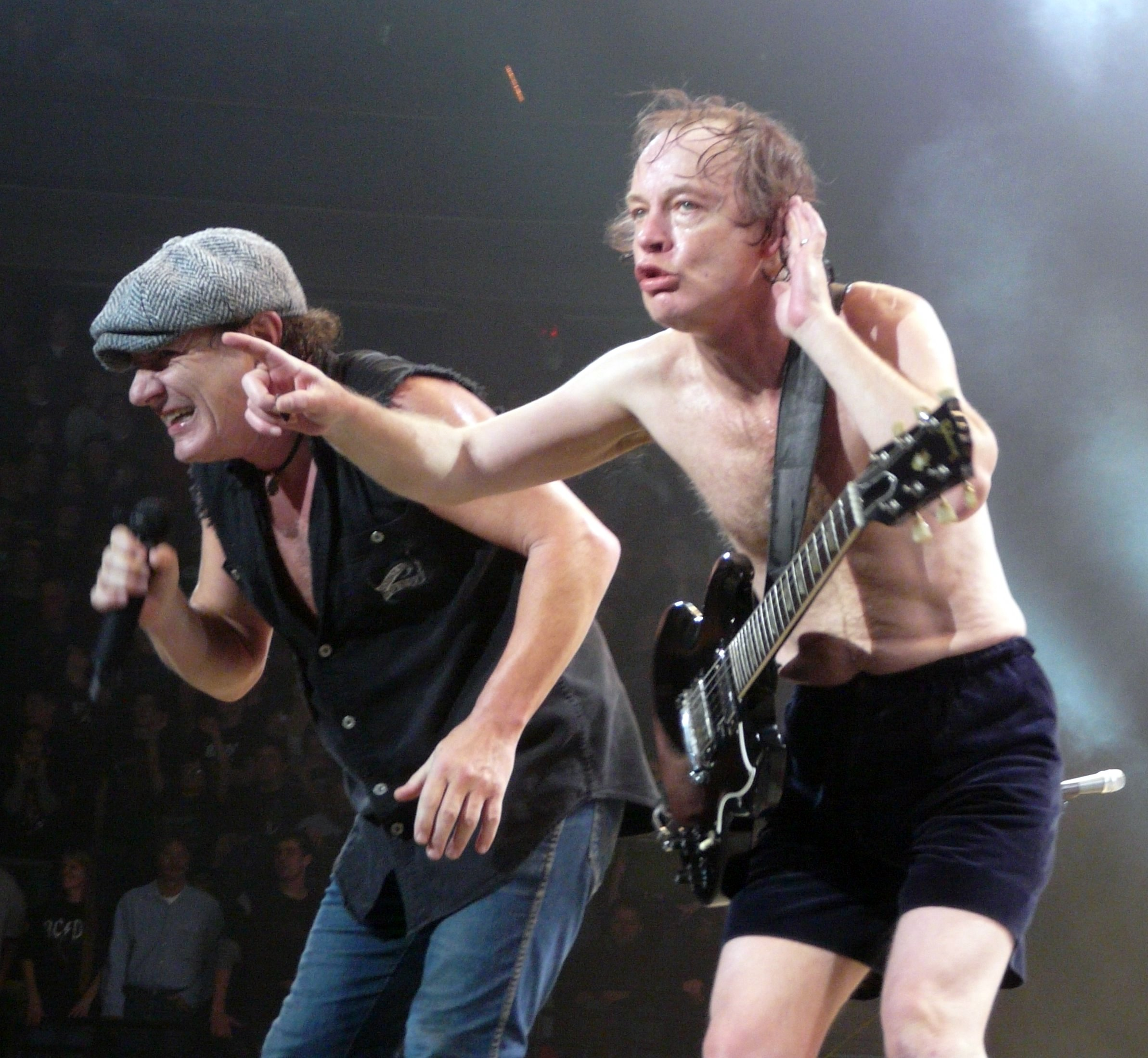
Brian Johnson (left) and Angus Young (right) performing in Saint Paul in 2008

The following is a list of songs known to have been recorded by Australian rock band AC/DC. Since 1973, they have released 18 studio albums (16 available worldwide and two issued only in Australasia), two soundtrack albums, three live albums, one extended play, 57 singles, 11 video albums, 52 music videos and two box sets. Although many AC/DC singles have been released, the band refused to issue any greatest hits-type packages. Brothers Angus (lead guitar) and Malcolm Young (rhythm guitar) formed AC/DC in November 1973 in Sydney. The band released two albums in Australasia before issuing their first international effort, High Voltage in 1976; the Youngs had been joined by vocalist Bon Scott, bassist Mark Evans and drummer Phil Rudd. In 1980, less than a year after the appearance of the successful Highway to Hell, Scott died and was replaced by British singer Brian Johnson, with whom AC/DC released their best-selling album, Back in Black. The album Black Ice, from 2008, reached number one in 29 countries. In 50 years of their career, AC/DC have sold over 200 million albums worldwide, roughly 100 million in the United States. Back in Black alone sold 25 million copies in the US (50 million worldwide), and went on to become the second highest-selling album in history.

Verizon made AC/DC albums available for digital download in 2007; for five years the band refused to release their albums via iTunes, as that company allows downloading of individual tracks. Angus Young observed, "We honestly believe the songs on any of our albums belong together. If we were on iTunes, we know a certain percentage of people would only download two or three songs from the album – and we don't think that represents us musically." However, in November 2012, the band relented and released their entire discography via iTunes. On 30 June 2015 their catalogue appeared on Spotify for the first time, which made their works available for streaming. Their most certified singles in the US are "You Shook Me All Night Long" and "Back in Black" (both 1980) – each have received 3× platinum from the Recording Industry Association of America (RIAA) in 2019. In Australia, "Thunderstruck" (1990) was accredited 10× platinum by the Australian Recording Industry Association (ARIA) in 2022.

== List ==
Key
†	Indicates songs released as a single

Name of song, writer(s), original release, and year of release
Title	Writer(s)	Album	Year	Ref.
"Ain't No Fun (Waiting 'Round to Be a Millionaire)"	Bon Scott; Angus Young; Malcolm Young	Dirty Deeds Done Dirt Cheap	1976	
"All Screwed Up"	Angus Young; Malcolm Young	Stiff Upper Lip	2000	
"Anything Goes" †	Angus Young; Malcolm Young	Black Ice	2008	
"Are You Ready" †	Angus Young; Malcolm Young	The Razors Edge	1990	
"Baby, Please Don't Go" †	Big Joe Williams	High Voltage (1975)	1975	
"Back in Black" †	Brian Johnson; Angus Young; Malcolm Young	Back in Black	1980	
"Back in Business"	Brian Johnson; Angus Young; Malcolm Young	Fly on the Wall	1985	
"Back Seat Confidential"	Bon Scott; Angus Young; Malcolm Young	Volts	1977	
"Bad Boy Boogie"	Bon Scott; Angus Young; Malcolm Young	Let There Be Rock	1977	
"Badlands"	Brian Johnson; Angus Young; Malcolm Young	Flick of the Switch	1983	
"Ballbreaker"	Angus Young; Malcolm Young	Ballbreaker	1995	
"Baptism by Fire"	Angus Young; Malcolm Young	Rock or Bust	2014	
"Beating Around the Bush"	Bon Scott; Angus Young; Malcolm Young	Highway to Hell	1979	
"Bedlam in Belgium"	Brian Johnson; Angus Young; Malcolm Young	Flick of the Switch	1983	
"Big Balls"	Bon Scott; Angus Young; Malcolm Young	Dirty Deeds Done Dirt Cheap	1976	
"Big Gun" †	Angus Young; Malcolm Young	Last Action Hero: Music from the Original Motion Picture	1993	
"Big Jack" †	Angus Young; Malcolm Young	Black Ice	2008	
"Black Ice"	Angus Young; Malcolm Young	Black Ice	2008	
"Boogie Man"	Angus Young; Malcolm Young	Ballbreaker	1995	
"Bonny"	Trad. arr. AC/DC	AC/DC Live	1992	
"Borrowed Time"	Brian Johnson; Angus Young; Malcolm Young	Non-album single (Note: The song was issued as the B-side from "That's the Way I Wanna Rock 'n' Roll", but was not included in the tracklist from the Blow Up Your Video album.)	1988	
"Brain Shake"	Brian Johnson; Angus Young; Malcolm Young	Flick of the Switch	1983	
"Breaking the Rules"	Brian Johnson; Angus Young; Malcolm Young	For Those About to Rock We Salute You	1981	
"Burnin' Alive"	Angus Young; Malcolm Young	Ballbreaker	1995	
"Can I Sit Next to You, Girl" †	Angus Young; Malcolm Young	Non-album single	1974	
"Can't Stand Still"	Angus Young; Malcolm Young	Stiff Upper Lip	2000	
"Can't Stop Rock 'n' Roll"	Angus Young; Malcolm Young	Stiff Upper Lip	2000	
"Carry Me Home"	Bon Scott; Angus Young; Malcolm Young	Non-album single (Note: The song was issued as the B-side from "Dog Eat Dog", but was not included in the tracklist from the Let There Be Rock album.)	1977	
"Caught with Your Pants Down"	Angus Young; Malcolm Young	Ballbreaker	1995	
"Chase the Ace"	Angus Young; Malcolm Young	Who Made Who	1986	
"C.O.D."	Brian Johnson; Angus Young; Malcolm Young	For Those About to Rock We Salute You	1981	
"Code Red"	Angus Young; Malcolm Young	Power Up	2020	
"Cold Hearted Man"	Bon Scott; Angus Young; Malcolm Young	Powerage	1978	
"Come and Get It"	Angus Young; Malcolm Young	Stiff Upper Lip	2000	
"Cover You in Oil" †	Angus Young; Malcolm Young	Ballbreaker	1995	
"Crabsody in Blue"	Bon Scott; Angus Young; Malcolm Young	Let There Be Rock	1977	
"Cyberspace"	Angus Young; Malcolm Young	Non-album single (Note: The song was issued as the B-side from "Safe in New York City", but was not included in the tracklist from the Stiff Upper Lip album.)	2000	
"Damned"	Angus Young; Malcolm Young	Stiff Upper Lip	2000	
"Danger" †	Brian Johnson; Angus Young; Malcolm Young	Fly on the Wall	1985	
"Decibel"	Angus Young; Malcolm Young	Black Ice	2008	
"Deep in the Hole"	Brian Johnson; Angus Young; Malcolm Young	Flick of the Switch	1983	
"Demon Fire" †	Angus Young; Malcolm Young	Power Up	2020	
"Dirty Deeds Done Dirt Cheap" †	Bon Scott; Angus Young; Malcolm Young	Dirty Deeds Done Dirt Cheap	1976	
"Dirty Eyes"	Bon Scott; Angus Young; Malcolm Young	Volts	1997	
"Dog Eat Dog" †	Bon Scott; Angus Young; Malcolm Young	Let There Be Rock	1977	
"Dogs of War"	Angus Young; Malcolm Young	Rock or Bust	2014	
"Down on the Borderline"	Angus Young; Malcolm Young	Non-album single (Note: The song was issued as the B-side from "Moneytalks", but was not included in the tracklist from The Razors Edge album.)	1990	
"Down Payment Blues"	Bon Scott; Angus Young; Malcolm Young	Powerage	1978	
"D.T."	Angus Young; Malcolm Young	Who Made Who	1986	
"Emission Control"	Angus Young; Malcolm Young	Rock or Bust	2014	
"Evil Walks"	Brian Johnson; Angus Young; Malcolm Young	For Those About to Rock We Salute You	1981	
"Fire Your Guns"	Angus Young; Malcolm Young	The Razors Edge	1990	
"First Blood"	Brian Johnson; Angus Young; Malcolm Young	Fly on the Wall	1985	
"Flick of the Switch" †	Brian Johnson; Angus Young; Malcolm Young	Flick of the Switch	1983	
"Fling Thing"	Trad. arr. AC/DC	Non-album single (Note: The song was issued as the B-side from "Jailbreak".)	1976	
"Fly on the Wall"	Brian Johnson; Angus Young; Malcolm Young	Fly on the Wall	1985	
"For Those About to Rock (We Salute You)" †	Brian Johnson; Angus Young; Malcolm Young	For Those About to Rock We Salute You	1981	
"The Furor"	Angus Young; Malcolm Young	Ballbreaker	1995	
"Get It Hot"	Bon Scott; Angus Young; Malcolm Young	Highway to Hell	1979	
"Gimme a Bullet"	Bon Scott; Angus Young; Malcolm Young	Powerage	1978	
"Girls Got Rhythm" †	Bon Scott; Angus Young; Malcolm Young	Highway to Hell	1979	
"Give It Up"	Angus Young; Malcolm Young	Stiff Upper Lip	2000	
"Givin the Dog a Bone"	Brian Johnson; Angus Young; Malcolm Young	Back in Black	1980	
"Go Down"	Bon Scott; Angus Young; Malcolm Young	Let There Be Rock	1977	
"Go Zone"	Brian Johnson; Angus Young; Malcolm Young	Blow Up Your Video	1988	
"Gone Shootin'"	Bon Scott; Angus Young; Malcolm Young	Powerage	1978	
"Goodbye and Good Riddance to Bad Luck"	Angus Young; Malcolm Young	The Razors Edge	1990	
"Got Some Rock & Roll Thunder"	Angus Young; Malcolm Young	Rock or Bust	2014	
"Got You by the Balls"	Angus Young; Malcolm Young	The Razors Edge	1990	
"Guns for Hire" †	Brian Johnson; Angus Young; Malcolm Young	Flick of the Switch	1983	
"Hail Caesar" †	Angus Young; Malcolm Young	Ballbreaker	1995	
"Hard as a Rock" †	Angus Young; Malcolm Young	Ballbreaker	1995	
"Hard Times"	Angus Young; Malcolm Young	Rock or Bust	2014	
"Have a Drink on Me"	Brian Johnson; Angus Young; Malcolm Young	Back in Black	1980	
"Heatseeker" †	Brian Johnson; Angus Young; Malcolm Young	Blow Up Your Video	1988	
"Hell Ain't a Bad Place to Be"	Bon Scott; Angus Young; Malcolm Young	Let There Be Rock	1977	
"Hell or High Water"	Brian Johnson; Angus Young; Malcolm Young	Fly on the Wall	1985	
"Hells Bells" †	Brian Johnson; Angus Young; Malcolm Young	Back in Black	1980	
"High Voltage" †	Bon Scott; Angus Young; Malcolm Young	T.N.T.	1975	
"Highway to Hell" †	Bon Scott; Angus Young; Malcolm Young	Highway to Hell	1979	
"Hold Me Back"	Angus Young; Malcolm Young	Stiff Upper Lip	2000	
"The Honey Roll"	Angus Young; Malcolm Young	Ballbreaker	1995	
"House of Jazz"	Angus Young; Malcolm Young	Stiff Upper Lip	2000	
"If You Dare"	Angus Young; Malcolm Young	The Razors Edge	1990	
"If You Want Blood (You've Got It)"	Bon Scott; Angus Young; Malcolm Young	Highway to Hell	1979	
"I'm a Rebel"	Alex Young	Unreleased (Note: The song was recorded on 16 September 1976, in Maschen, Germany. It wasn't included in Dirty Deeds Done Dirt Cheap, nor the Bonfire and Backtracks box sets. It was covered by German heavy metal band Accept, as the lead single of the album of the same name.)	1976	
"Inject the Venom"	Brian Johnson; Angus Young; Malcolm Young	For Those About to Rock We Salute You	1981	
"It's a Long Way to the Top (If You Wanna Rock 'n' Roll)" †	Bon Scott; Angus Young; Malcolm Young	T.N.T.	1975	
"The Jack"	Bon Scott; Angus Young; Malcolm Young	T.N.T.	1975	
"Jailbreak"	Bon Scott; Angus Young; Malcolm Young	Dirty Deeds Done Dirt Cheap	1976	
"Kicked in the Teeth"	Bon Scott; Angus Young; Malcolm Young	Powerage	1978	
"Kick You When You're Down"	Angus Young; Malcolm Young	Power Up	2020	
"Kissin' Dynamite"	Brian Johnson; Angus Young; Malcolm Young	Blow Up Your Video	1988	
"Landslide"	Brian Johnson; Angus Young; Malcolm Young	Flick of the Switch	1983	
"Let Me Put My Love Into You"	Brian Johnson; Angus Young; Malcolm Young	Back in Black	1980	
"Let There Be Rock" †	Bon Scott; Angus Young; Malcolm Young	Let There Be Rock	1977	
"Let's Get It Up" †	Brian Johnson; Angus Young; Malcolm Young	For Those About to Rock We Salute You	1981	
"Let's Make It"	Angus Young; Malcolm Young	The Razors Edge	1990	
"Little Lover"	Bon Scott; Angus Young; Malcolm Young	High Voltage (1975)	1975	
"Live Wire"	Bon Scott; Angus Young; Malcolm Young	T.N.T.	1975	
"Love at First Feel" †	Bon Scott; Angus Young; Malcolm Young	Dirty Deeds Done Dirt Cheap	1976	
"Love Bomb"	Angus Young; Malcolm Young	Ballbreaker	1995	
"Love Hungry Man"	Bon Scott; Angus Young; Malcolm Young	Highway to Hell	1979	
"Love Song"	Bon Scott; Angus Young; Malcolm Young	High Voltage (1975)	1975	
"Mean Streak"	Brian Johnson; Angus Young; Malcolm Young	Blow Up Your Video	1988	
"Meltdown"	Angus Young; Malcolm Young	Stiff Upper Lip	2000	
"Miss Adventure"	Angus Young; Malcolm Young	Rock or Bust	2014	
"Mistress for Christmas"	Angus Young; Malcolm Young	The Razors Edge	1990	
"Money Made" †	Angus Young; Malcolm Young	Black Ice	2008	
"Money Shot"	Angus Young; Malcolm Young	Power Up	2020	
"Moneytalks" †	Angus Young; Malcolm Young	The Razors Edge	1990	
"Nervous Shakedown" †	Brian Johnson; Angus Young; Malcolm Young	Flick of the Switch	1983	
"Nick of Time"	Brian Johnson; Angus Young; Malcolm Young	Blow Up Your Video	1988	
"Night of the Long Knives"	Brian Johnson; Angus Young; Malcolm Young	For Those About to Rock We Salute You	1981	
"Night Prowler"	Bon Scott; Angus Young; Malcolm Young	Highway to Hell	1979	
"No Man's Land"	Angus Young; Malcolm Young	Power Up	2020	
"Overdose"	Bon Scott; Angus Young; Malcolm Young	Let There Be Rock	1977	
"Play Ball" †	Angus Young; Malcolm Young	Rock or Bust	2014	
"Playing with Girls"	Brian Johnson; Angus Young; Malcolm Young	Fly on the Wall	1985	
"Problem Child"	Bon Scott; Angus Young; Malcolm Young	Dirty Deeds Done Dirt Cheap	1976	
"Put the Finger on You"	Brian Johnson; Angus Young; Malcolm Young	For Those About to Rock We Salute You	1981	
"The Razors Edge"	Angus Young; Malcolm Young	The Razors Edge	1990	
"Realize" †	Angus Young; Malcolm Young	Power Up	2020	
"Rejection"	Angus Young; Malcolm Young	Power Up	2020	
"Ride On"	Bon Scott; Angus Young; Malcolm Young	Dirty Deeds Done Dirt Cheap	1976	
"Riff Raff"	Bon Scott; Angus Young; Malcolm Young	Powerage	1978	
"R.I.P. (Rock in Peace)"	Bon Scott; Angus Young; Malcolm Young	Dirty Deeds Done Dirt Cheap	1976	
"Rising Power"	Brian Johnson; Angus Young; Malcolm Young	Flick of the Switch	1983	
"Rock and Roll Ain't Noise Pollution" †	Brian Johnson; Angus Young; Malcolm Young	Back in Black	1980	
"Rocker"	Bon Scott; Angus Young; Malcolm Young	T.N.T.	1975	
"Rocking All the Way"	Angus Young; Malcolm Young	Black Ice	2008	
"Rockin' in the Parlour"	Angus Young; Malcolm Young	Non-album single (Note: The song was issued as the B-side from "Can I Sit Next to You, Girl".)	1974	
"Rock 'n' Roll Damnation" †	Bon Scott; Angus Young; Malcolm Young	Powerage	1978	
"Rock 'n' Roll Dream"	Angus Young; Malcolm Young	Black Ice	2008	
"Rock 'n' Roll Singer"	Bon Scott; Angus Young; Malcolm Young	T.N.T.	1975	
"Rock 'n' Roll Train" †	Angus Young; Malcolm Young	Black Ice	2008	
"Rock or Bust" †	Angus Young; Malcolm Young	Rock or Bust	2014	
"Rock the Blues Away" †	Angus Young; Malcolm Young	Rock or Bust	2014	
"Rock the House"	Angus Young; Malcolm Young	Rock or Bust	2014	
"Rock Your Heart Out"	Angus Young; Malcolm Young	The Razors Edge	1990	
"Ruff Stuff"	Brian Johnson; Angus Young; Malcolm Young	Blow Up Your Video	1988	
"Safe in New York City" †	Angus Young; Malcolm Young	Stiff Upper Lip	2000	
"Satellite Blues" †	Angus Young; Malcolm Young	Stiff Upper Lip	2000	
"School Days"	Chuck Berry	T.N.T.	1975	
"Send for the Man"	Brian Johnson; Angus Young; Malcolm Young	Fly on the Wall	1985	
"Shake a Leg"	Brian Johnson; Angus Young; Malcolm Young	Back in Black	1980	
"Shake Your Foundations" †	Brian Johnson; Angus Young; Malcolm Young	Fly on the Wall	1985	
"She Likes Rock n Roll"	Angus Young; Malcolm Young	Black Ice	2008	
"She's Got Balls"	Bon Scott; Angus Young; Malcolm Young	High Voltage (1975)	1975	
"Shoot to Thrill" †	Brian Johnson; Angus Young; Malcolm Young	Back in Black	1980	
"Shot Down in Flames"	Bon Scott; Angus Young; Malcolm Young	Highway to Hell	1979	
"Shot in the Dark" †	Angus Young; Malcolm Young	Power Up	2020	
"Shot of Love"	Angus Young; Malcolm Young	The Razors Edge	1990	
"Show Business"	Bon Scott; Angus Young; Malcolm Young	High Voltage (1975)	1975	
"Sin City"	Bon Scott; Angus Young; Malcolm Young	Powerage	1978	
"Sink the Pink" †	Brian Johnson; Angus Young; Malcolm Young	Fly on the Wall	1985	
"Skies on Fire"	Angus Young; Malcolm Young	Black Ice	2008	
"Smash 'n' Grab"	Angus Young; Malcolm Young	Black Ice	2008	
"Snake Eye"	Brian Johnson; Angus Young; Malcolm Young	Non-album single (Note: The song was issued as the B-side from "Heatseeker", only issued as a twelve-inch single or three-inch CD single, but was not included in the tracklist from the Blow Up Your Video album.)	1988	
"Snowballed"	Brian Johnson; Angus Young; Malcolm Young	For Those About to Rock We Salute You	1981	
"Some Sin for Nuthin'"	Brian Johnson; Angus Young; Malcolm Young	Blow Up Your Video	1988	
"Soul Stripper"	Angus Young; Malcolm Young	High Voltage (1975)	1975	
"Spellbound"	Brian Johnson; Angus Young; Malcolm Young	For Those About to Rock We Salute You	1981	
"Spoilin' for a Fight"	Angus Young; Malcolm Young	Black Ice	2008	
"Squealer"	Bon Scott; Angus Young; Malcolm Young	Dirty Deeds Done Dirt Cheap	1976	
"Stand Up"	Brian Johnson; Angus Young; Malcolm Young	Fly on the Wall	1985	
"Stick Around"	Bon Scott; Angus Young; Malcolm Young	High Voltage (1975)	1975	
"Stiff Upper Lip" †	Angus Young; Malcolm Young	Stiff Upper Lip	2000	
"Stormy May Day"	Angus Young; Malcolm Young	Black Ice	2008	
"Sweet Candy"	Angus Young; Malcolm Young	Rock or Bust	2014	
"Systems Down"	Angus Young; Malcolm Young	Power Up	2020	
"That's the Way I Wanna Rock 'n' Roll" †	Brian Johnson; Angus Young; Malcolm Young	Blow Up Your Video	1988	
"There's Gonna Be Some Rockin'"	Bon Scott; Angus Young; Malcolm Young	Dirty Deeds Done Dirt Cheap	1976	
"This House Is on Fire"	Brian Johnson; Angus Young; Malcolm Young	Flick of the Switch	1983	
"This Means War"	Brian Johnson; Angus Young; Malcolm Young	Blow Up Your Video	1988	
"Through the Mists of Time" †	Angus Young; Malcolm Young	Power Up	2020	
"Thunderstruck" †	Angus Young; Malcolm Young	The Razors Edge	1990	
"T.N.T." †	Bon Scott; Angus Young; Malcolm Young	T.N.T.	1975	
"Touch Too Much" †	Bon Scott; Angus Young; Malcolm Young	Highway to Hell	1979	
"Two's Up"	Brian Johnson; Angus Young; Malcolm Young	Blow Up Your Video	1988	
"Up to My Neck in You"	Bon Scott; Angus Young; Malcolm Young	Powerage	1978	
"Walk All Over You"	Bon Scott; Angus Young; Malcolm Young	Highway to Hell	1979	
"War Machine"	Angus Young; Malcolm Young	Black Ice	2008	
"What Do You Do for Money Honey"	Brian Johnson; Angus Young; Malcolm Young	Back in Black	1980	
"What's Next to the Moon"	Bon Scott; Angus Young; Malcolm Young	Powerage	1978	
"Wheels"	Angus Young; Malcolm Young	Black Ice	2008	
"Whiskey on the Rocks"	Angus Young; Malcolm Young	Ballbreaker	1995	
"Whole Lotta Rosie" †	Bon Scott; Angus Young; Malcolm Young	Let There Be Rock	1977	
"Who Made Who" †	Brian Johnson; Angus Young; Malcolm Young	Who Made Who	1986	
"Wild Reputation"	Angus Young; Malcolm Young	Power Up	2020	
"Witch's Spell" †	Angus Young; Malcolm Young	Power Up	2020	
"You Ain't Got a Hold on Me"	Bon Scott; Angus Young; Malcolm Young	High Voltage (1975)	1975	
"You Shook Me All Night Long" †	Brian Johnson; Angus Young; Malcolm Young	Back in Black	1980	
