= Live at River Plate (album) =

2012 live album by AC/DC

Live album by AC/DC
- Released: 19 November 2012
- Recorded: 4 December 2009
- Venue: River Plate Stadium (Buenos Aires)
- Genre: Hard rock
- Length: 110:36
- Label: Columbia

AC/DC chronology
Iron Man 2 (2010)	Live at River Plate (2012)	Rock or Bust (2014)

Professional ratings
Review scores
Source	Rating
Allmusic	3/5 stars

Live at River Plate is a live album by the Australian hard rock band AC/DC, released on 19 November 2012.

The album was recorded during AC/DC's Black Ice World Tour on 4 December 2009 at River Plate Stadium in Buenos Aires. Video footage from the same concert was previously officially released in May 2011 on DVD and Blu-ray as Live at River Plate. This is the band's final release to feature original rhythm guitarist and co-founder Malcolm Young before his retirement in 2014 due to poor health.

== Critical and commercial response ==
The album received mixed to positive reviews from publications such as Allmusic, for which Stephen Thomas Erlewine stated that while the band's vocalist, "Brian Johnson[,] sounds a little worse for wear" still "the brothers Young, Cliff Williams, and Phil Rudd remain as solid as a boulder". Newer songs such as "Rock 'n' Roll Train", in Erlewine's opinion, fit in perfectly alongside AC/DC's earlier work that that group continues to play. He praised the band overall for providing "a heavy dose of heavy rock & roll" even after decades of performing.

With the release of Live at River Plate in the U.K., the top ten of the U.K. Rock & Metal Singles chart was composed of all AC/DC songs. "Back in Black", "Highway to Hell", "You Shook Me All Night Long", "Thunderstruck", "Whole Lotta Rosie", "Shoot to Thrill", "Hells Bells", "It's a Long Way to the Top (If You Wanna Rock 'n' Roll)", "For Those About to Rock (We Salute You)", and "T.N.T." all charted within the top ten in corresponding order. In particular, several songs in the chart were actually the studio versions. This resulted from the move of having all of AC/DC's albums being re-released on iTunes at the time of Live at River Plate's release.

== Track listing ==
Disc one
No.	Title	Writer(s)	Length
1.	"Rock 'n' Roll Train"	Angus Young; Malcolm Young	4:41
2.	"Hell Ain't a Bad Place to Be"	A. Young; Bon Scott; M. Young	4:27
3.	"Back in Black"	A. Young; Brian Johnson; M. Young	4:14
4.	"Big Jack"	A. Young; M. Young	4:07
5.	"Dirty Deeds Done Dirt Cheap"	A. Young; Scott; M. Young	4:58
6.	"Shot Down in Flames"	A. Young; Scott; M. Young	3:47
7.	"Thunderstruck"	A. Young; M. Young	5:32
8.	"Black Ice"	A. Young; M. Young	3:43
9.	"The Jack"	A. Young; Scott; M. Young	10:11
10.	"Hells Bells"	A. Young; Johnson; M. Young	5:37

Disc two
No.	Title	Writer(s)	Length
1.	"Shoot to Thrill"	A. Young; Johnson; M. Young	5:55
2.	"War Machine"	A. Young; M. Young	3:39
3.	"Dog Eat Dog"	A. Young; Scott; M. Young	5:09
4.	"You Shook Me All Night Long"	A. Young, M. Young, Johnson	4:01
5.	"T.N.T."	A. Young; Scott; M. Young	3:57
6.	"Whole Lotta Rosie"	A. Young; Scott; M. Young	5:57
7.	"Let There Be Rock"	A. Young; Scott; M. Young	18:05
8.	"Highway to Hell"	A. Young; Scott; M. Young	4:43
9.	"For Those About to Rock (We Salute You)"	A. Young; Johnson; M. Young	7:44

Disc three (Saturn.de exclusive edition)
No.	Title	Writer(s)	Length
1.	"Rock and Roll Ain't Noise Pollution (Live at the Circus Krone, Munich, 17 June 2003)"	A. Young; Johnson; M. Young
2.	"If You Want Blood (You've Got It) (Live at the Circus Krone, Munich, 17 June 2003)"	A. Young; Scott; M. Young
3.	"What's Next to the Moon (Live at the Circus Krone, Munich, 17 June 2003)"	A. Young; Scott; M. Young

== Personnel ==
- Brian Johnson – lead vocals
- Angus Young – lead guitar, backing vocals on "T.N.T" and "Dirty Deeds Done Dirt Cheap".
- Malcolm Young – rhythm guitar, backing vocals
- Cliff Williams – bass guitar, backing vocals
- Phil Rudd – drums

== Chart performance ==
=== Weekly charts ===
Chart (2012)	Peak position
Argentine Albums (CAPIF)	7
Australian Albums (ARIA)	11
Austrian Albums (Ö3 Austria)	3
Belgian Albums (Ultratop Flanders)	11
Belgian Albums (Ultratop Wallonia)	17
Canadian Albums (Billboard)	16
Danish Albums (Hitlisten)	8
Dutch Albums (Album Top 100)	30
Finnish Albums (Suomen virallinen lista)	42
French Albums (SNEP)	13
Greek Albums (IFPI)	64
Hungarian Albums (MAHASZ)	20
Irish Albums (IRMA)	23
Italian Albums (FIMI)	18
New Zealand Albums (RMNZ)	23
Norwegian Albums (VG-lista)	6
Polish Albums (ZPAV)	38
Portuguese Albums (AFP)	23
Scottish Albums (Official Charts)	10
Spanish Albums (Promusicae)	12
Swedish Albums (Sverigetopplistan)	13
Swiss Albums (Schweizer Hitparade)	4
UK Albums (Official Charts)	14
US Billboard 200	66
US Top Rock Albums (Billboard)	17

=== Year-end charts ===
Chart (2012)	Position
Australian Albums (ARIA)	81
Austrian Albums (Ö3 Austria)	45
French Albums (SNEP)	95
Swedish Albums (Sverigetopplistan)	89

Chart (2013)	Position
Belgian Albums (Ultratop Flanders)	149
Belgian Albums (Ultratop Wallonia)	191
Spanish Albums (PROMUSICAE)	47

=== Decade-end charts ===
Chart (2010–2019)	Position
Germany (Official German Charts)	42

== Certifications ==
Region	Certification	Certified units/sales
Australia (ARIA)	Gold	35,000^{^}
Austria (IFPI Austria)	Gold	10,000^{*}
Brazil (Pro-Música Brasil)	2× Platinum	80,000^{‡}
Denmark (IFPI Danmark)	Gold	10,000^{‡}
France (SNEP)	Gold	50,000^{*}
Germany (BVMI)	Gold	100,000^{^}
Italy (FIMI)	Gold	25,000^{*}
Portugal (AFP)	Gold	7,500^{^}
Spain (Promusicae)	Gold	20,000^{^}
United Kingdom (BPI)	Gold	100,000^{*}
^{*} Sales figures based on certification alone.^{^} Shipments figures based on certification alone.^{‡} Sales+streaming figures based on certification alone.

== See also ==
- AC/DC discography
- Live at River Plate (live concert film)
