= Back in Baroque... The String Tribute to AC/DC =

Back in Baroque: The String Tribute to AC/DC

Compilation album by Vitamin String Quartet
- Released: 2003
- Genre: Classical/Hard rock
- Length: 43:17
- Label: Vitamin

Back in Baroque: The String Tribute to AC/DC is a classical version of the album Back in Black by hard rock band AC/DC. It replaces the vocals and guitars of the original songs with an array of stringed instruments.

== Track listing ==
1. Hells Bells
2. Shoot to Thrill
3. What Do You Do for Money Honey
4. Give the Dog a Bone
5. Let Me Put My Love into You
6. Back in Black
7. You Shook Me All Night Long
8. Have a Drink on Me
9. Shake a Leg
10. Rock & Roll Ain't Noise Pollution

== Reception ==
Professional ratings
Review scores
Source	Rating
Allmusic	2.5/5 stars
