= Fly on the Wall (AC/DC album) =

1985 studio album by AC/DC

- Cover art by Todd Schorr

Studio album by AC/DC
- Released: 1 July 1985
- Recorded: October 1984 – February 1985
- Studio: Mountain (Montreux)
- Genres: Hard rock; heavy metal
- Length: 40:30
- Labels: Albert; Atlantic
- Producers: Angus Young; Malcolm Young

AC/DC chronology
'74 Jailbreak (1984)	Fly on the Wall (1985)	Who Made Who (1986)

Singles from Fly on the Wall
- 1. "Danger" Released: June 1985; 2. "Sink the Pink" Released: September 1985 (Aus); 3. "Shake Your Foundations" Released: October 1985

Fly on the Wall is the tenth studio album by Australian hard rock band AC/DC, released on 1 July 1985 by Albert Productions, and Atlantic Records. The album was re-released in 2003 as part of the AC/DC Remasters series.

== Background and recording ==
Although AC/DC's 1983 album Flick of the Switch was a commercial and critical failure, the band remained one of the biggest hard rock acts in the world. In October 1984, Atlantic Records released to the United States the EP '74 Jailbreak, a collection of studio tracks previously unreleased outside Australia, taken mainly from the band's 1975 Australian debut High Voltage. In January 1985, the band took three weeks off from recording what would become Fly on the Wall to headline two nights at the 10-day Rock in Rio festival in Rio de Janeiro, Brazil, appearing to over 250,000 people on 19 January with Scorpions, Whitesnake, and Ozzy Osbourne.

The sessions for Fly on the Wall took place at Mountain Studios in Montreux, Switzerland from October 1984 to February 1985. Released on 28 June, it was AC/DC's first album since the Australian release of T.N.T. not to include drummer Phil Rudd, who was replaced by Simon Wright (although Wright appeared in music videos for Flick of the Switch tracks), making it the first AC/DC album with all band members born in the UK.

It was the second and last album to be produced by the band members. But in contrast to the preceding Flick of the Switch – produced by the band as a whole – Fly on the Wall was produced by guitarists Angus and Malcolm Young, who hoped to capture the rawness and simplicity of their early work in a time when pop-oriented glam metal had become popular. In a 1985 interview with Sky Channel for the Monsters of Rock show, frontman Brian Johnson explained: "In my experience, the lads went in with a producer, but they were still really telling the lad what they wanted, so in a round-about way all it is an extra pair of ears. An expensive extra pair of ears."

== Video ==
Fly on the Wall

Video by AC/DC
- Released: Summer 1985
- Genres: Hard rock; heavy metal
- Labels: Albert; Atlantic
- Producers: Angus Young; Malcolm Young

Fly on the Wall is a home video by AC/DC, released in the summer of 1985. It consisted of a single music video of five of the songs from the album. The visuals involved AC/DC playing at a bar while various shady characters interacted with an animated fly, much like the one on the cover of the album. It features the band playing (in order) "Fly on the Wall", "Danger", "Sink the Pink", "Stand Up", and "Shake Your Foundations". If nothing else, the video demonstrated the band's new commitment to the now powerful MTV by going beyond performance-based videos.

The entire video (minus the credits with the song "Playing With Girls") can be found on disc two of the band's 2005 Family Jewels DVD compilation.

== Reception ==
Professional ratings
Review scores
Source	Rating
AllMusic	3/5 stars
Collector's Guide to Heavy Metal	7/10
The Encyclopedia of Popular Music	2/5 stars
The Rolling Stone Album Guide	2.5/5 stars

The album was not well received by critics and its one million US sales paled beside those of Back in Black and For Those About to Rock We Salute You. The singles "Shake Your Foundations" and "Sink the Pink" are seen as standouts; both were later included on the band's soundtrack album Who Made Who for Stephen King's film Maximum Overdrive. The song "Danger" fell flat in concert and was banished from the set. Some critics also complained that Johnson's vocals were difficult to decipher, and the band would indeed raise them in the remix for "Shake Your Foundations" on Who Made Who.

In the original Rolling Stone review of the album, Tim Holmes wrote, "You'd never guess how sexist and politically incorrect all this is if you didn't read the lyric sheet, because you sure can't make out a single word coming out of the dentist's-drill glottis of Brian Johnson (except maybe the song titles, which tend to be repeated like mantras). Angus Young is also in great form, playing the dumbest, most irresistibly repetitive chords in the lexicon." According to Steve Huey of AllMusic, "Fly on the Wall continues AC/DC's descent into cookie-cutter mediocrity, with the leering humor of past glories seeming forced and uninspired, and the music remaining somewhat underdeveloped and directionless." In his 1994 Bon Scott biography Highway to Hell, author Clinton Walker calls the album a "disaster". Martin Popoff observed how Fly on the Wall "tries desperately to recapture wasted youth, yet the material for the most part is cookie-cutter AC/DC" and remarked Brian Johnson's awkward vocals "mixed quite far back, possibly because he's sounding raspier and more incoherent than ever". US gossip magazine People picked the LP as the best album of 1985.

Retrospective reviews are also largely negative. Classic Rock explains that Malcolm and Angus Young "made AC/DC sound like a tribute act on a bad night, and as writers all they could muster was one half-decent song, Shake Your Foundations. All told, the album is a disaster." Ultimate Classic Rock agrees with this sentiment, saying that it was when the band started losing relevancy from the hair metal and thrash metal movements, and while the material does "suggest the band was trying a little too hard to fit in, at least they were trying."

The album does, however, have at least one "high-profile" fan: singer/songwriter Ryan Adams, who said "I had an epiphany while I was running and some songs from Fly on the Wall came on. That's a record I could always put on my run mix and I don't have to leave any songs off."

== Tour and controversy ==
The Fly on the Wall Tour was marred by bad publicity when serial killer Richard Ramirez was arrested. Ramirez, nicknamed the "Night Stalker" by the press, told police that "Night Prowler" from Highway to Hell (1979) had driven him to commit murder. Police also claimed that Ramirez was wearing an AC/DC shirt and left an AC/DC hat at one of the crime scenes. As Murray Engelheart observes in his book AC/DC: Maximum Rock & Roll, "It was just what the band's detractors had been waiting for and the media, especially in America, immediately seized on the case. Wild accusations that AC/DC were, in fact, devil worshippers were bandied about... The lyrics of 'Night Prowler' were carefully analysed and some newspapers attempted to link Ramirez's Satanism with AC/DC's name, somehow arriving at the conclusion that AC/DC actually stood for Anti-Christ, Devil's Child."

The band maintained that the song had been given a murderous connotation by Ramírez, but is actually about a boy sneaking into his girlfriend's bedroom at night while her parents are asleep. In a 2000 interview for the MuchMoreMusic documentary The Story of AC/DC, Angus says wryly, "I can't remember the last black mass I attended."

== Track listing ==
All tracks are written by Malcolm Young, Angus Young, and Brian Johnson.

Side one
No.	Title	Length
1.	"Fly on the Wall"	3:44
2.	"Shake Your Foundations"	4:10
3.	"First Blood"	3:46
4.	"Danger"	4:22
5.	"Sink the Pink"	4:15

Side two
No.	Title	Length
6.	"Playing with Girls"	3:44
7.	"Stand Up"	3:53
8.	"Hell or High Water"	4:32
9.	"Back in Business"	4:24
10.	"Send for the Man"	3:36
Total length:		40:30

== Personnel ==
- Brian Johnson – lead vocals
- Angus Young – lead guitar
- Malcolm Young – rhythm guitar, backing vocals
- Cliff Williams – bass guitar, backing vocals
- Simon Wright – drums, percussion

=== Production ===
- Produced by Angus and Malcolm Young
- Mark Dearnley – engineer
- Bob Defrin – art director
- Todd Schorr – cover illustration
- SMAY Vision – booklet design (reissue)
- Ebet Roberts, George Bodnar, Barry Plummer – photography

== Charts ==
Chart performance for Fly on the Wall
Chart (1985)	Peak position
Australian Albums (Kent Music Report)	4
Austrian Albums (Ö3 Austria)	16
Canada Top Albums/CDs (RPM)	30
Dutch Albums (Album Top 100)	26
Finnish Albums (Suomen virallinen lista)	7
German Albums (Offizielle Top 100)	14
New Zealand Albums (RMNZ)	22
Norwegian Albums (VG-lista)	17
Swedish Albums (Sverigetopplistan)	10
Swiss Albums (Schweizer Hitparade)	19
UK Albums (Official Charts)	7
US Billboard 200	32

Chart (2026)	Peak position
Greek Albums (IFPI)	33

== Certifications ==
Region	Certification	Certified units/sales
Australia (ARIA)	3× Platinum	210,000^{^}
Germany (BVMI)	Gold	250,000^{^}
Spain (Promusicae)	Gold	50,000^{^}
Switzerland (IFPI Switzerland)	Gold	25,000^{^}
United Kingdom (BPI)	Silver	60,000^{^}
United States (RIAA)	Platinum	1,000,000^{^}
^{^} Shipments figures based on certification alone.
