= Who Made Who =

1986 soundtrack album by AC/DC

Soundtrack album by AC/DC
- Released: 26 May 1986
- Recorded: January 1976 – December 1985
- Genre: Hard rock
- Length: 37:50
- Labels: Albert; Atlantic
- Producers: Robert John "Mutt" Lange; AC/DC

AC/DC chronology
Fly on the Wall (1985)	Who Made Who (1986)	Blow Up Your Video (1988)

Singles from Who Made Who
- 1. "Who Made Who" Released: 12 May 1986; 2. "You Shook Me All Night Long" Released: 18 August 1986

Who Made Who is a soundtrack album by Australian hard rock band AC/DC. Released on 26 May 1986, the album is the soundtrack to the Stephen King film Maximum Overdrive. The album was re-released in 2003 as part of the AC/DC Remasters series.

== Background ==
Three tracks on the album – "Who Made Who" and the instrumentals "D.T." and "Chase the Ace" – were newly written and recorded by AC/DC for the album. The remaining tracks were previously released by the band. Only one song, "Ride On", features previous lead vocalist Bon Scott, who died in 1980. All others feature his replacement, Brian Johnson.

Along with the album, the band released a 24-minute videotape, which contained music videos for the songs "Who Made Who", "You Shook Me All Night Long", "Shake Your Foundations" (remixed), "Hells Bells", and footage from a live performance of "For Those About to Rock (We Salute You)", which was filmed in Detroit in 1983.

The video for the title track, directed by David Mallet, was recorded at the Brixton Academy in London and features a theme of countless clones of AC/DC guitarist Angus Young. According to the book AC/DC: Maximum Rock & Roll, these clones consisted of hundreds of fans who came from all over the UK, many of whom slept in the freezing cold in front of Brixton Academy for the opportunity to take part. This group was made up of approximately 300 members of the band's British fan club as well as others who had simply heard about the event on the radio.

== Lyrics ==
The song "Who Made Who" was written for the Stephen King movie Maximum Overdrive, whose theme was machines that came alive and began killing people. The lyrics explore the idea of the gadgets and devices created by mankind coming to rule over human beings instead of the other way around, the irony where humans become subservient to the technology they created.

== Reception ==
Professional ratings
Review scores
Source	Rating
AllMusic	3/5 stars
Christgau's Record Guide	B
Collector's Guide to Heavy Metal	6/10
The Rolling Stone Album Guide	4/5 stars

Though the film it was created for was derided by critics and financially flopped, the album reached No. 16 in the UK and No. 33 in the US. The title track was the group's most successful single in years, reaching the top 10 in Australia and number 16 in the UK. It was also voted the second best track of 1986 by the readers of Hit Parader magazine. Following this, a re-issue of "You Shook Me All Night Long" was released from the album, peaking at #46 in the UK. The album has sold five million copies in the US. Stephen Thomas Erlewine of AllMusic calls the album "a ripping AC/DC retrospective" and applauds the band "rescuing songs like 'Sink the Pink' from otherwise mediocre albums."

== Track listing ==
=== Album ===
All tracks are written by Angus Young, Malcolm Young and Brian Johnson, except where noted.

Side one
No.	Title	Writer(s)	Producer(s)	Length
1.	"Who Made Who"		Harry Vanda; George Young	3:27
2.	"You Shook Me All Night Long" (from Back in Black)		Robert John "Mutt" Lange	3:30
3.	"D.T." (instrumental)	A. Young; M. Young	Vanda; G. Young	2:53
4.	"Sink the Pink" (from Fly on the Wall)		A. Young; M. Young	4:13
5.	"Ride On" (from Dirty Deeds Done Dirt Cheap)	A. Young; M. Young; Bon Scott	Vanda; G. Young	5:51

Side two
No.	Title	Writer(s)	Producer(s)	Length
6.	"Hells Bells" (from Back in Black)		Lange	5:12
7.	"Shake Your Foundations" (remix; original version from Fly on the Wall)		Vanda; G. Young	3:53
8.	"Chase the Ace" (instrumental)	A. Young; M. Young	Vanda; G. Young	3:01
9.	"For Those About to Rock (We Salute You)" (from For Those About to Rock We Salute You)		Lange	5:53

=== Video ===
A VHS titled "Who Made Who" was also released to support the album.

1. "Who Made Who"
2. "You Shook Me All Night Long" (alternate version, filmed in 1986 specifically to promote the "Who Made Who" album)
3. "Shake Your Foundations"
4. "Hells Bells"
5. "For Those About to Rock (We Salute You)" [Joe Louis Arena, Detroit - November 1983]
- All five videos were re-released as part of the Family Jewels DVD set.

== Personnel ==
AC/DC

- Angus Young – lead guitar
- Malcolm Young – rhythm guitar, backing vocals
- Cliff Williams – bass guitar, backing vocals (tracks 1–4, 6–9)
- Brian Johnson – lead vocals (tracks 1–4, 6–9)
- Simon Wright – drums (tracks 1, 3, 4, 7, 8)

Other musicians

- Bon Scott – lead vocals (track 5)
- Phil Rudd – drums (tracks 2, 5, 6, 9)
- Mark Evans – bass guitar (track 5)

== Charts ==
=== Weekly charts ===
Weekly chart performance for Who Made Who
Chart (1986–2008)	Peak position
Australian Albums (Kent Music Report)	4
Austrian Albums (Ö3 Austria)	28
Dutch Albums (Album Top 100)	47
Finnish Albums (Suomen virallinen lista)	6
German Albums (Offizielle Top 100)	24
New Zealand Albums (RMNZ)	24
Swedish Albums (Sverigetopplistan)	21
Swiss Albums (Schweizer Hitparade)	21
UK Albums (Official Charts)	16
US Billboard 200	33

=== Year-end charts ===
Year-end chart performance for Who Made Who
Chart (1986)	Position
US Billboard 200	100

Chart (2002)	Position
Canadian Metal Albums (Nielsen SoundScan)	53

== Certifications ==
Certifications for Who Made Who
Region	Certification	Certified units/sales
Australia (ARIA)	5× Platinum	350,000^{^}
Germany (BVMI)	Platinum	500,000^{^}
New Zealand (RMNZ)	Gold	7,500^{‡}
Switzerland (IFPI Switzerland)	Gold	25,000^{^}
United Kingdom (BPI)	Gold	100,000^{‡}
United States (RIAA)	5× Platinum	5,000,000^{^}
^{^} Shipments figures based on certification alone.^{‡} Sales+streaming figures based on certification alone.
