= Shake Your Foundations =

1985 single by AC/DC

Single by AC/DC

from the album Fly on the Wall
- B-side: "Send For The Man" (US); "Stand Up" (UK)
- Released: 21 October 1985 (US); 6 January 1986 (UK)
- Recorded: 1985
- Studio: Mountain (Montreux)
- Genre: Hard rock
- Length: 4:10
- Label: Albert; Atlantic
- Songwriters: Angus Young; Malcolm Young; Brian Johnson
- Producers: Angus Young; Malcolm Young

AC/DC singles chronology
| "Sink the Pink" (1985) | "Shake Your Foundations" (1985) | "Who Made Who" (1986) |

Music video
- "Shake Your Foundations" (from Fly on the Wall Home Video) on YouTube

"Shake Your Foundations" is a song and single by Australian hard rock band AC/DC, written by Angus and Malcolm Young and Brian Johnson.

The single was released in October 1985, taken from their 1985 album Fly on the Wall. The track was remixed by Harry Vanda and George Young, who worked with AC/DC on earlier albums, and released on Who Made Who, the soundtrack to the Stephen King film Maximum Overdrive. In this short remix, the song is shortened from 4:10 to 3:53. The drum track begins at seventeen seconds and the full band kicks in at 48 seconds. Also, Johnson's vocals can be heard more clearly in the remix. Vinyl releases of the album include the remix, while most CD releases include the original version.

== Personnel ==
- Brian Johnson – lead vocals
- Angus Young – lead guitar
- Malcolm Young – rhythm guitar
- Cliff Williams – bass guitar
- Simon Wright – drums

== Charts ==
| Chart (1986) | Peak position |
|---|---|
| UK Singles (OCC) | 24 |
| Australia (Kent Music Report) | 97 |
