= Rock and Roll Ain't Noise Pollution =

1980 single by AC/DC

Single by AC/DC

from the album Back in Black
- B-side: "Hells Bells"
- Released: 7 November 1980 (UK)
- Recorded: April – May 1980
- Studio: Compass Point (Nassau)
- Genre: Hard rock; blues rock
- Length: 4:12
- Label: Atlantic
- Songwriters: Angus Young; Malcolm Young; Brian Johnson
- Producer: Robert John "Mutt" Lange

AC/DC singles chronology
"Hells Bells" (1980)	"Rock and Roll Ain't Noise Pollution" (1980)	"Back in Black" (1980)

Music video
- "Rock and Roll Ain't Noise Pollution" on YouTube

"Rock and Roll Ain't Noise Pollution" is a song by Australian rock band AC/DC. It is the tenth and final track of their album released in 1980, Back in Black. It is the fourth and final single released from the album. The song reached number 15 on the UK singles charts, the highest placing of any song on the album.

== Background ==
Initially only nine tracks were written for Back in Black but Atlantic Records, as well as the band's management recommended that they should write one more song. Angus and Malcolm wrote the song in about 15 minutes. Lead singer Brian Johnson recalled "I'll never forget the start of it. I went into the recording booth, the intro starts and I hear: 'Brian, it's Mutt. Could you say something over that?" He starts to repeat the lyrics loudly, head tilted slightly back: "All you middle men throw away your fancy clothes. For some reason middle men were in the news at the time, the top guys weren't getting the blame and the workforce weren't getting it either, it was the middle men who were this grey area. I must have picked up on it and it just went from there."

Malcolm explained the origin of the song:

"We were in London at the time and there were all those problems with the old Marquee Club because it was in a built-up area and there was this whole thing about noise pollution in the news, the environmental health thing that you couldn't have your stereo up loud after 11 at night, it all came from that."

== Release ==
The song also appears in videos like No Bull (1996), Family Jewels (2005) and Plug Me In (2007), also appears on the boxset Bonfire (1997).

The song appears on the 2003 tribute album by various artists to the band, Back in Baroque: The String Tribute to AC / DC, it was also covered in 2004 by death metal band Six Feet Under in the album Graveyard Classics 2. Alex Gibson also covered the song in 2008 from the album Rockabye Baby!: Lullaby Renditions of AC/DC. The song was featured in a commercial for Nike in 2006, as well as one for Applebee's in 2016.

== Track listing ==
1. "Rock and Roll Ain't Noise Pollution" – 4:12
2. "Hells Bells" – 5:10

== Chart positions ==
=== Weekly charts ===
Chart (1980/81)	Peak position
Australian (Kent Music Report)	7
Irish Singles Chart	15
UK Singles Chart	15

=== Year-end charts ===
Year-end chart performance for "Rock and Roll Ain't Noise Pollution"
Chart (1981)	Position
Australia (Kent Music Report)	82

== Certifications ==
Region	Certification	Certified units/sales
Canada (Music Canada)	Platinum	80,000^{‡}
New Zealand (RMNZ)	Gold	15,000^{‡}
^{‡} Sales+streaming figures based on certification alone.

== Personnel ==
AC/DC

- Brian Johnson – lead vocals
- Angus Young – lead guitar
- Malcolm Young – rhythm guitar, backing vocals
- Cliff Williams – bass guitar, backing vocals
- Phil Rudd – drums

Additional personnel

- Robert John "Mutt" Lange – producer, backing vocals
