= Who Made Who (song) =

1986 single by AC/DC

Single by AC/DC

from the album Who Made Who
- B-side: "Guns for Hire" (live)
- Released: 12 May 1986
- Length: 3:27
- Label: Albert Productions; Atlantic
- Songwriters: Angus Young; Malcolm Young; Brian Johnson
- Producers: Harry Vanda; George Young

AC/DC singles chronology
"Shake Your Foundations" (1985)	"Who Made Who" (1986)	"Heatseeker" (1988)

Music video
- "Who Made Who" on YouTube

"Who Made Who" is a song by the Australian hard rock band AC/DC, released as the lead single from their 1986 soundtrack album, Who Made Who. The 12-inch single format of the single features an extended mix of the song and can be found in the Deluxe Edition of AC/DC's Backtracks Boxset, on Disc 1, Studio Rarities. It was one of only three new tracks on Who Made Who, because the album is not only a soundtrack to Stephen King's Maximum Overdrive, but a compilation album featuring tracks from previous albums. The other two new tracks were instrumentals. "Who Made Who" reached number nine in Australia, number one in Finland, and number 23 on the US Billboard Album Rock Tracks chart.

In addition to the song itself, "Who Made Who" has also been played live, mostly throughout the subsequent world tour and the Blow Up Your Video World Tour. It was also played live with replacement drummer Chris Slade throughout The Razors Edge World Tour, and with drummer Phil Rudd (who returned to the band in 1994 after being fired from the group 11 years prior) for only one gig at the opening night of the Ballbreaker World Tour in Greensboro, North Carolina, after which the song was dropped and has not been played live since. A live version was released on the 1992 album AC/DC Live.

== Music video ==
In the video to this song, directed by David Mallet, filmed in the lobby of and onstage at the Brixton Academy music venue in London, fans and radio contest winners were dressed like Angus Young, and carried red cardboard guitars similar to Angus's Gibson SG. The video's plot features scientists replicating Angus by means of science fiction technology; the lookalikes are shown en masse, marching in time to the song and raising their heads to chant the title phrase along with the chorus. A photo of Angus standing amid a group of his counterparts can be found inside the 2003 Digipak release of Who Made Who. A couple of AC/DC shows had some look alike Anguses on the stage with them, such as at the Nassau Coliseum in Uniondale, New York, where six were present.

== Personnel ==
- Brian Johnson – vocals
- Angus Young – lead guitar
- Malcolm Young – rhythm guitar
- Cliff Williams – bass guitar
- Simon Wright – drums

== Charts ==
=== Weekly charts ===
Chart (1986)	Peak position
Australia (Kent Music Report)	9
Europe (European Hot 100 Singles)	62
Finland (Suomen virallinen lista)	1
Ireland (IRMA)	9
New Zealand (Recorded Music NZ)	35
Norway (VG-lista)	7
UK Singles (Official Charts)	16
US Mainstream Rock (Billboard)	23

=== Year-end charts ===
Chart (1986)	Position
Australia (Kent Music Report)	36

== Certifications ==
Region	Certification	Certified units/sales
Canada (Music Canada)	2× Platinum	160,000^{‡}
New Zealand (RMNZ)	Gold	15,000^{‡}
^{‡} Sales+streaming figures based on certification alone.
