= You Shook Me All Night Long =

1980 single by AC/DC

Single by AC/DC

from the album Back in Black and Who Made Who
- B-side: "Have a Drink on Me" (UK/US) "What Do You Do for Money Honey" (Aus)
- Released: 15 August 1980
- Recorded: April – May 1980
- Studio: Compass Point (Nassau)
- Genre: Hard rock
- Length: 3:32
- Label: Albert; Atlantic
- Songwriters: Angus Young; Malcolm Young; Brian Johnson
- Producer: Robert John "Mutt" Lange

AC/DC singles chronology
"Touch Too Much" (1980)	"You Shook Me All Night Long" (1980)	"Hells Bells" (1980)

Alternative cover
- 1986 re-release

Music video
- "You Shook Me All Night Long" "You Shook Me All Night Long" (Who Made Who) on YouTube

"You Shook Me All Night Long" is a song by Australian hard rock band AC/DC, from the album Back in Black. The song also reappeared on their later soundtrack album Who Made Who. It is AC/DC's first single with Brian Johnson as the lead singer, replacing Bon Scott who died of alcohol poisoning in February 1980. It reached number 35 on the US Billboard Hot 100 pop singles chart in 1980. The single was re-released internationally in 1986, following the release of the album Who Made Who. The re-released single in 1986 contains the B-side(s): B1. "She's Got Balls" (Live, Bondi Lifesaver '77); B2. "You Shook Me All Night Long" (Live '83 – 12-inch maxi-single only). It is considered AC/DC's signature song.

In January 2018, as part of Triple M's "Ozzest 100", the "most Australian" songs of all time, "You Shook Me All Night Long" was ranked number 63.

== Critical reception ==
Record World said it has "a truckload of gravel and enough raunch to satisfy a stadium-size crowd," as well as "havoc wrecking guitar blasts."

"You Shook Me All Night Long" placed at number 10 on VH1's list of "The 100 Greatest Songs of the 80s". It was also number 1 on VH1's "Top Ten AC/DC Songs". Guitar World placed "You Shook Me All Night Long" at number 80 on their "100 Greatest Guitar Solos" list. In 2021, it was ranked at No. 287 on Rolling Stone's "Top 500 Greatest Songs of All Time."

Rock critic Robert Christgau regarded it as a "drum-hooked fucksong" and the band's "only great work of art".

== Live versions ==
The song has also become a staple of AC/DC concerts, and is rarely excluded from the setlist.

Four live versions of the song were officially released. The first one appeared on the 1986 maxi-single "You Shook Me All Night Long"; the second one was included on the band's album Live; the third version is on the soundtrack to the Howard Stern movie Private Parts, and also appears on the AC/DC box set Backtracks; and the fourth one is on the band's live album, Live at River Plate.

"You Shook Me All Night Long" was also the second song to be played by AC/DC on Saturday Night Live in 2000, following their performance of "Stiff Upper Lip." When AC/DC was inducted to the Rock and Roll Hall of Fame in 2003 by Steven Tyler of Aerosmith, they performed this song with Tyler.

Johnson performed the song with Billy Joel at Madison Square Garden in New York in March 2014. The Salon publication stated on the following morning in its introduction to the video footage of the performance: "This will either be your favorite video today, or a total musical nightmare!"

At one of his two shows at St James' Park in June 2023, Sam Fender brought Johnson on stage to perform "Back in Black" and "You Shook Me All Night Long" with him.

== Composition ==
"You Shook Me All Night Long"

The song is in the key of G major. The main verse and riff follows a G–C–D chord progression.

== Controversy ==
There have been several claims made since it was released that (at least) some parts of the lyrics to the song were written by Bon Scott.

Silver Smith, late former girlfriend of Bon Scott, interviewed by Jesse Fink for his biography of Scott, Bon: The Last Highway, said: "I know for sure that [the song] was written at [my flat in] Gloucester Road [in Kensington, London] back in '76. 'She told me to come but I was already there' – he wrote that in a letter to somebody, one of his grotty mates, just after we got together, actually. He always kept notebooks and added and subtracted to them and so on. He put in 'American thighs' even way back then, because that was the market they were going to try and crack. So that was written a long time ago." In the same book, Scott's girlfriend in Miami, Florida, a woman under the pseudonym "Holly X", says the original lyric "chartreuse eyes" was changed to "sightless eyes" and that she had a horse called Doubletime. The lyrics "working double time on the seduction line" appear in the finished song.

Doug Thaler, Bon's friend and AC/DC's booking agent on their American tours, also says: "I don't care who tells me anything different: you can bet your life that Bon Scott wrote the lyrics to 'You Shook Me All Night Long'. It's Bon Scott's lyrics all over the place."

From AC/DC: Hell Ain't a Bad Place to Be by Mick Wall: "However Malcolm Dome claims that shortly before he died, Bon 'shoved me his book of lyrics. He had sheets of lyrics that he kept in a file, carried them around. He'd been showing me some of the ideas he'd been working for Back in Black. Not the song 'Back in Black' but songs that were for the next album. There were a couple of lines, like, 'She told me to come but I was already there', which ended up in 'You Shook Me All Night Long' – that's a Bon lyric. And I saw it. I saw it written down. There were lyrics, lines used, on Back in Black that Bon wrote. [But] he wasn't credited and to this day no one's really sure what happened. I don't think he even got close to finishing the whole songs. But there are lines in there that I know."

Dome also stated "Bon proudly showed me some of the scribbles he'd put down in preparation for an album he felt would define AC/DC – and open up new possibilities as well. It's hard to be absolutely accurate from a distance of quarter of a century, and through the haze of alcohol which enveloped the night, but one line sticks in my mind as being on one of those sheets: 'She told me to come, but I was already there.' A renowned lyric from the song 'You Shook Me All Night Long', it has Bon's trademark all over it – a neatly worked double entendre that fits in with the track record of a man who wrote Big Balls, The Jack and other similarly styled songs."

== Music video ==
There are two music videos. The first is directed by Eric Dionysius and Eric Mistler, is similar to the other Back in Black videos ("Back in Black", "Hells Bells", "What Do You Do For Money Honey", "Rock and Roll Ain't Noise Pollution" and "Let Me Put My Love Into You") and is available on the special Back in Black, The Videos. It is also included on the Backtracks box set.

The second is directed by David Mallet and released six years after the song's original release (when the song was reissued in Who Made Who). Angus and Malcolm Young follow Johnson around the West Riding of Yorkshire town of Huddersfield, with Angus Young wearing his signature schoolboy outfit. The video clip casts the English glamour model Corinne Russell, a former Hill's Angel and Page 3 Girl—along with other leather clad women wearing suits with zips at the groin region—pedaling exercise bicycles in the background.

The VH1 series Pop-Up Video revealed that, during the scene with the mechanical bull, the woman playing Johnson's lover accidentally jabbed herself with her spur twice. The roadie who came to her aid married her a year later, and Angus Young gave them a mechanical bull as a wedding present as a joke. In the original 1980 video Phil Rudd played drums, while the 1986 video showed Simon Wright, who replaced Rudd in 1983. Rudd returned to AC/DC in 1994.

== Personnel ==
AC/DC

- Brian Johnson – lead vocals
- Angus Young – lead guitar
- Malcolm Young – rhythm guitar, backing vocals
- Cliff Williams – bass guitar, backing vocals
- Phil Rudd – drums

Additional personnel

- Robert John "Mutt" Lange – producer, backing vocals

== Charts ==
=== Weekly charts ===
Chart (1980)	Peak position
Australia (Kent Music Report)	8
France (SNEP)	29
Ireland (IRMA)	19
UK Singles (Official Charts)	38
US Billboard Hot 100	35
West Germany (GfK)	29

Chart (1986)	Peak position
UK Singles (Official Charts)	46

Chart (2012)	Peak position
Australia (ARIA)	49
France (SNEP)	124
UK Singles (Official Charts)	42

Chart (2015)	Peak position
Sweden Heatseeker (Sverigetopplistan)	5

Chart (2017)	Peak position
US Hot Rock & Alternative Songs (Billboard)	11

Chart (2024)	Peak position
Global 200 (Billboard)	199

=== Year-end charts ===
Chart (1980)	Position
Australia (Kent Music Report)	42

== Certifications ==
Region	Certification	Certified units/sales
Australia (ARIA)	10× Platinum	700,000^{‡}
Brazil (Pro-Música Brasil)	Platinum	60,000^{‡}
Canada (Music Canada)	Diamond	800,000^{‡}
Denmark (IFPI Danmark)	Platinum	90,000^{‡}
Germany (BVMI)	Platinum	600,000^{‡}
Italy (FIMI)	2× Platinum	140,000^{‡}
Mexico (AMPROFON)	Diamond+2× Platinum	420,000^{‡}
New Zealand (RMNZ)	6× Platinum	180,000^{‡}
Portugal (AFP)	Platinum	40,000^{‡}
Spain (Promusicae)	2× Platinum	120,000^{‡}
United Kingdom (BPI)	2× Platinum	1,200,000^{‡}
United States (RIAA)	6× Platinum	6,000,000^{‡}
United States (RIAA) (Mastertone)	Platinum	1,000,000^{*}
^{*} Sales figures based on certification alone.^{‡} Sales+streaming figures based on certification alone.

== In popular culture ==
- The song was released as a vinyl single by the band Slingshot, featuring singer Kathy Kosins, in 1983; the single was distributed only in the United States, Germany, Canada and Italy.
- The ending credits of the 1986 horror film Maximum Overdrive played this song throughout.
- As noted above, AC/DC performed the song live in the closing scene of Private Parts, the 1997 biopic of radio personality Howard Stern.
- The song appears in the 2001 movie A Knight's Tale, starring Heath Ledger.
- Celine Dion and Anastacia performed a live duet of the song at the 2002 VH1 Divas Las Vegas concert.
- Shania Twain covered "You Shook Me All Night Long" in her "Up! Close and Personal" television special in 2003.
- American country music duo Big & Rich covered "You Shook Me All Night Long" for their 2007 album, Between Raising Hell and Amazing Grace.
- The American long-running series, Supernatural Season 4, featured "You Shook Me All Night Long" for the opening of the first episode "Lazarus Rising".
- The American series, New Girl Season 1, featured "You Shook Me All Night Long" for the ending of the 24th episode "See Ya".

== See also ==
- List of highest-certified singles in Australia
