= Danger (AC/DC song) =

1985 single by AC/DC

Single by AC/DC

from the album Fly on the Wall
- B-side: "Back in Business"; "Hell or High Water" (Aus)
- Released: 21 June 1985
- Recorded: 1985
- Genre: Hard rock
- Length: 4:24
- Label: Albert; Atlantic
- Songwriter(s): Angus Young; Malcolm Young; Brian Johnson
- Producer(s): Angus Young; Malcolm Young

AC/DC singles chronology
"Nervous Shakedown" (1984)	"Danger" (1985)	"Sink the Pink" (1985)

Music video
- "Danger" on YouTube

"Danger" is a single by Australian rock band AC/DC, from the album Fly on the Wall released in 1985. A stripped down blues shuffle, it was written by Brian Johnson, Angus Young, and Malcolm Young.

Cash Box said that the song "is a gritty and blues inflected effort" with "growling vocals and tale of drunken fun." Billboard said that the "monarchs of metal growl and bluster at a lumbering pace."

In most territories, the single's B-side was "Back in Business", but in Australia and New Zealand, "Hell or High Water" was featured.

== Personnel ==
- Brian Johnson – lead vocals
- Angus Young – lead guitar
- Malcolm Young – rhythm guitar
- Cliff Williams – bass guitar
- Simon Wright – drums

== Charts ==
Chart (1985)	Peak position
Australian (Kent Music Report)	69
New Zealand (Recorded Music NZ)	47
United Kingdom (Official Singles Chart)	48
