= Maximum Overdrive =

1986 film by Stephen King

- Theatrical release poster
- Directed by: Stephen King
- Screenplay by: Stephen King
- Based on: "Trucks" by Stephen King
- Produced by: Martha Schumacher
- Starring: Emilio Estevez; Pat Hingle; Laura Harrington; Christopher Murney
- Cinematography: Armando Nannuzzi
- Edited by: Evan A. Lottman
- Music by: AC/DC
- Distributed by: De Laurentiis Entertainment Group
- Release date: July 25, 1986
- Running time: 98 minutes
- Country: United States
- Language: English
- Budget: $9 million
- Box office: $7.4 million or $3.5 million (North America)

Maximum Overdrive is a 1986 American science fiction action horror film written and directed by Stephen King in his directorial debut. The film stars Emilio Estevez, Pat Hingle, Laura Harrington, John Short, Yeardley Smith and Christopher Murney. The screenplay was inspired by and loosely based on King's short story "Trucks", which was included in the author's first collection of short stories, Night Shift, and follows the events after all machines (including trucks, radios, arcade games, vending machines, etc.) become automatic, sentient and violent towards humans when Earth crosses the tail of a comet, initiating a worldwide killing spree.

The film is King's only directorial effort, though dozens of films have been based on his novels or short stories. It contained black humor elements and a generally campy tone, which contrasts with King's somber subject matter in books. The film has a mid-1980s hard rock soundtrack composed entirely by the group AC/DC (King's favorite band), whose album Who Made Who was released as the Maximum Overdrive soundtrack. It includes the best-selling singles "Who Made Who", "You Shook Me All Night Long" and "Hells Bells".

Maximum Overdrive was theatrically released on July 25, 1986, to critical and commercial failure. The film was nominated for two Golden Raspberry Awards including Worst Director for King and Worst Actor for Estevez in 1987, but both lost to Prince for Under the Cherry Moon. King disowned the film, describing it as a "moron movie", and considered the process a learning experience, after which he intended never to direct again. Regardless of its initial failure, the film has developed a dedicated cult following over the decades as a "so bad it's good" horror classic.

== Plot ==
On June 19, 1987, as the Earth crosses the tail of a rogue comet, Rhea-M, previously inanimate machines spring to life; an ATM insults a customer and a bascule bridge rises during heavy traffic, causing all vehicles upon the bridge to fall into the river or collide. Chaos sets in as machines begin hunting down and ruthlessly killing humans worldwide. At the Dixie Boy Truck Stop outside Wilmington, North Carolina, employee Duncan Keller is blinded after a gas pump sprays diesel in his eyes. After an electric knife injures waitress Wanda June and arcade machines in the back room electrocute a customer, cook and paroled ex-convict Bill Robinson begins to suspect foul play. Meanwhile, at a Little League game, a vending machine kills the coach by firing canned soda at him. A driverless road roller flattens a fleeing child, while Duncan's son Deke escapes on his bike.

Newlyweds Connie and Curtis discover a corpse at a roadside gas station, but escape in their car when a tow truck attempts to kill Curtis. Meanwhile, humans and pets are murdered by lawnmowers, chainsaws, electric hair dryers, pocket radios, RC cars and an ice cream truck. At the Dixie Boy, a garbage truck kills Duncan when he departs to search for Deke, and a truck sporting a giant fiberglass Green Goblin mask on its grille slams bible salesman Camp Loman into a ditch. Later, big rig trucks encircle the truck stop.

Connie and Curtis outmaneuver a semi-truck, causing it to crash off the side of the road and explode. They arrive at the fortified truck stop, where it is safer than out in the open. As they try to pass between the trucks, their car is hit and overturned. Bill and hitchhiker Brett Graham rush to help them before the trucks attack. The owner Bubba Hendershot uses M72 LAW rockets he had stored in a bunker hidden under the diner to destroy many of the trucks. Deke later arrives at the Dixie Boy and attempts entrance via the sewers, but is obstructed by the wire mesh covering the opening. That night, the survivors hear Loman screaming, and Bill and Curtis sneak out via the sewers to help him. Deke discovers Loman, believing him dead, but he awakens and attacks Deke. Bill and Curtis rescue Deke and determine that Loman is indeed dead, but a truck then chases them back into the pipe.

The next morning, a bulldozer and a platform truck drive to the truck stop. The angered Hendershot uses the rocket launcher to blow up the bulldozer but only succeeds in blowing its roof off, but the platform truck fires its post-mounted machine gun into the building, killing many including him and Wanda. The truck then demands, via sending morse code signals through its horn that Deke deciphers, that the humans pump the trucks' diesel for them in exchange for their lives.

As the survivors realize that their own machines have enslaved them, Bill suggests that they escape to Haven, an island off the coast, on which no motorized vehicles are permitted. While the crew rests, Bill theorizes that the comet is actually a "broom" operated by interstellar aliens that are using Earth's machines to destroy humanity so the aliens can repopulate the Earth. The next day, during a fueling operation, Bill sneaks a grenade onto the platform truck, destroying it, then leads the party out of the diner via a sewer hatch to the main road just as the trucks and the bulldozer demolish the entire building. As the remaining people approach the marina, the ice cream truck appears, but Brett and Curtis open fire and destroy it. The Green Goblin truck stalks them to the marina and kills Brad, a trucker distracted by a diamond ring on a corpse's finger. After Bill destroys it with a hit from a rocket shot, the survivors board a sailboat and set sail for Haven.

Further events are described in text while the boat sails away. Two days later, the machines go silent when a UFO hiding in the comet's tail is destroyed by a Soviet space platform disguised as a weather satellite, equipped with nuclear missiles and a laser cannon. Six days later, Earth passes out of the comet's tail, and the survivors are still alive.

== Cast ==
- Emilio Estevez as Bill Robinson
- Pat Hingle as Bubba Hendershot
- Laura Harrington as Brett Graham
- Yeardley Smith as Connie
- John Short as Curtis
- Ellen McElduff as Wanda June
- Frankie Faison as Handy
- Leon Rippy as Brad
- Christopher Murney as Camp Loman
- J. C. Quinn as Duncan Keller
- Holter Graham as Deke Keller
- Barry Bell as Steve Gayton
- Patrick Miller as Joey
- J. Don Ferguson as Andy
- Giancarlo Esposito as Videoplayer
- Stephen King (cameo) as ATM man.
- Marla Maples as 2nd woman

== Production ==
The film was the first to be made by Embassy Pictures after it had been bought by Dino De Laurentiis. Principal photography began in early May 1985, in and around Wilmington, North Carolina, as De Laurentiis operated a large studio complex in the area. De Laurentiis chose North Carolina because it was a "right-to-work state", meaning that he could hire non-union crews, which would greatly cut down on production costs.

It would be the directorial debut of the writer Stephen King, who had a three-picture deal with De Laurentiis. In a 2002 interview with Tony Magistrale for the book Hollywood's Stephen King, first-time director King stated that he was "coked out of [his] mind all through its production, and... really didn't know what [he] was doing". On-set translator Roberto Croci did not remember King's cocaine use, but recalls him drinking from early in the morning until late at night. "I never saw. I didn't. But I did know that he was drunk. That 6 o'clock in the morning we have a roll call and he's drinking beers. And by 8:30, he's on his 10th beer."

At a fan screening in 2021, Jock Brandis, the film's gaffer, told the audience that King rode a motorcycle from Maine to Wilmington, so he could ride alongside semi-trucks on the highway. He wanted to get a better feel for how terrifying big-rigs could be when in close proximity, and to better know their loud sounds and movements. When King arrived at the studio on his bike for the initial production meeting, the security guards wouldn't let him through the front gate because they did not believe he was part of any production taking place on the lot. His appearance was disheveled, and he was rambling on about a film he was to direct involving killer trucks that had come alive due to a space comet. He was granted access to the studio lot after Brandis pointed out that the plates on his motorcycle were from Maine. Brandis, a Canadian gaffer who had worked with De Laurentiis on David Cronenberg's adaptation of The Dead Zone, was tasked with many jobs not normally given to a film gaffer. De Laurentiis erroneously believed Brandis could speak Italian, and would be able to bridge the language gap between Italian cinematographer Armando Nannuzzi and the local crew. Nannuzzi had previously worked in Wilmington with De Laurentiis on Silver Bullet, and would struggle with communication throughout the film, often nodding and replying "yes, yes, yes," to every question. Along with being the production's chief lighting technician, Brandis procured many of the trucks used in production, most of which still featured names from actual local businesses on the cabs and trailers. Brandis is also featured in the opening scenes of the film, driving a 1968 Ford F-Series dump truck over the Isabella Holmes draw bridge when it opens.

Stephen King originally wanted Bruce Springsteen to play the role of Bill Robinson. Springsteen was unknown by De Laurentiis, so De Laurentiis personally hired "Martin's son", Emilio Estevez. It is believed De Laurentiis's insistence that Estevez participate in the film was when King became disillusioned with the production. King did try to create a positive environment for the crew, at one point renting out an entire theater to screen classic films such as Godzilla and Night of the Living Dead. He provided free refreshments and personal commentary during each film. King would also participate in golf cart races on the studio lot during down time.

Many wardrobe and special effects choices were made by De Laurentiis personally. During a dailies screening of Laura Harrington's first scene, De Laurentiis became upset that she was wearing jeans. A new scene was written so her character Brett Graham could change into something more revealing for the rest of the film. The "Dixie Boy Truck Stop" set was built alongside of US-17/74, just across the Cape Fear River near Wilmington, North Carolina. It was a purpose-built location, existing specifically for the film. The land is now a privately owned storage area. All of the interior scenes were filmed at De Laurentiis' Wilmington-based studio facility, which at the time was called "DEG," or De Laurentiis Entertainment Group. One of the iconic Green Goblin heads from the cab of the Happy Toyz truck remained on the studio lot until the mid-90s, when it was sold to a private collector.

While shooting the scene when a lawnmower comes alive in a residential neighborhood, Nannuzzi was struck in the right eye, his "shooting eye", by a large splinter of wood that had become lodged in the blade. According to camera assistant Silvia Giulietti, "We were shooting a scene where a lawnmower—the machine that cut the grass—was following a boy to kill him. And we put the camera on the ground with piece of wood beneath. To wedge, okay? I remember that Armando Nanuzzi [sic] ask to Stephen King, "Can we take out the blades?" But Stephen King say, "no, no, I like to see them." Armando say, "But we don't see them in the shot." But Stephen King say, "No. No. Better that you let it." The special effects department had also suggested removing the blade for safety reasons, but King continued to insist that it remain, so the scene could appear more life-like. Nannuzzi was helicoptered from set and then flown to a hospital in Raleigh where he eventually lost his eye. Production was halted for a brief period, but Nannuzzi returned to finish the film. After the film was released, Nannuzzi sued King, De Laurentiis Productions, and sixteen others involved with the film for $18 million. The suit was filed in New York, as King and many of the other defendants often did business in that state. The case was later settled for $975,000. Nannuzzi continued to work on films after his accident, but believed he would never again be considered for big-budget projects, as producers did not want a cameraman without depth perception. He returned to Italy, where he worked until his retirement in 1998. He died on May 14, 2001.

During some of the studio production work, Wilmington was grazed by Hurricane Gloria. Winds and rain were very heavy, and the crews had a competition to see who could move from stage to stage without being blown over. Production was eventually halted again for a brief time while the storm passed and the studio lot could be assessed for damage.

Pat Hingle, who played Dixie Boy owner Bubba Hendershot, moved to Wilmington after the production wrapped. He lived in nearby Carolina Beach until his death in 2009.

== Reception ==
Maximum Overdrive was panned by critics. On Rotten Tomatoes the film has an approval rating of 14% based on reviews from 14 critics. On Metacritic the film has a score of 24% based on reviews from eight critics, indicating "generally unfavorable reviews". Audiences surveyed by CinemaScore gave the film a grade D+ on scale of A to F.

Jon Pareles of The New York Times wrote that "by making the machines' malevolence so all-encompassing — so amoral — Mr. King loses the fillip of retribution in better horror films. For the most part, he has taken a promising notion — our dependence on our machines — and turned it into one long car-crunch movie, wheezing from setups to crackups." Variety called it "the kind of film audiences want to talk back to, the kind that throws credibility out the window in favor of crass manipulation. Unfortunately, master manipulator Stephen King, making his directorial debut from his own script, fails to create a convincing enough environment to make the kind of nonsense he's offering here believable or fun." Patrick Goldstein of the Los Angeles Times wrote, "As long as King is tinkering with his crazed machines, the film sustains a certain amount of ominous tension, but as soon as the author turns his attention to his actors, the movie's slender storyline goes limp ... Worse still, the movie never really builds up any momentum or jars us with unexpected jolts of horror."

Writing in the Chicago Tribune, Rick Kogan gave the film one star (out of four) and called it "a mess of a movie", further stating that "King's direction is heavy-handed and his dialogue hackneyed and stiff." Paul Attanasio of The Washington Post wrote that the film "is like sitting alongside a 3-year-old as he skids his Tonka trucks across the living room floor and says 'Whee!' except on a somewhat grander scale", and added that as a director Stephen King "proves that he hasn't got an ounce of visual style, the vaguest idea of how to direct actors or the sense that God gave a grapefruit."

In Leonard Maltin's annual publication TV Movie Guide, the film is given a "BOMB" rating. Two Golden Raspberry Award nominations were given out, to Emilio Estevez for Worst Actor and King for Worst Director at the 7th Golden Raspberry Awards.

John Clute and Peter Nicholls have offered a modest reappraisal of Maximum Overdrive, admitting the film's many flaws, but arguing that several scenes display enough visual panache to suggest that King was not entirely without talent as a director.

== Remake ==
The film was later followed by a television film, Trucks, which aired on the USA Network on October 29, 1997.

== Potential second remake ==
In October 2020, Stephen King's son Joe Hill expressed interest in writing and directing a Maximum Overdrive remake with some alterations to the original material.

== In popular culture ==
The 10th season episode "Maximum Homerdrive" (1999) of The Simpsons features a plot where Homer Simpson (Dan Castellaneta) takes over truck driver Red Barclay (Hank Azaria)'s delivery and finds out that his truck is controlled by an on-board computer. Yeardley Smith, who plays Connie in the film, is the voice of Lisa Simpson in the show.

== See also ==
- "Killdozer!" (story)
- List of American films of 1986
