= Hells Bells (song) =

1980 single by AC/DC

- Artwork for one of the continental European releases

Single by AC/DC

from the album Back in Black
- B-side: "What Do You Do for Money Honey"
- Released: 31 October 1980
- Recorded: April–May 1980
- Studio: Compass Point (Nassau)
- Genre: Hard rock
- Length: 5:12
- Label: Atlantic
- Songwriters: Angus Young; Malcolm Young; Brian Johnson
- Producer: Robert John "Mutt" Lange

AC/DC singles chronology
"You Shook Me All Night Long" (1980)	"Hells Bells" (1980)	"Rock and Roll Ain't Noise Pollution" (1980)

Music video
- "Hells Bells" on YouTube

"Hells Bells" is the first track of Back in Black, the seventh studio album by Australian hard rock band AC/DC and their comeback album after the death of lead singer Bon Scott. "Hells Bells" is the second single from Back in Black, released on 31 October 1980. The song also appears on Who Made Who, AC/DC's 1986 soundtrack to the Stephen King film Maximum Overdrive and on both versions of 1992's AC/DC Live.

== Composition ==
"Hells Bells" begins with the slow, funereal tolling of a 2,000-pound (900 kg) bronze bell. Manufactured by John Taylor & Co Bellfounders in Loughborough, the sound of the bell was recorded by Tony Platt using Ronnie Lane's mobile studio inside the bell foundry following the completion of the Back in Black tracking sessions at Compass Point Studios in the Bahamas.

== Reception ==
"Hells Bells" is widely regarded as one of the band's best songs. In 2020, The Guardian ranked the song number six on their list of the 40 greatest AC/DC songs, and in 2021, Kerrang! ranked the song number seven on their list of the 20 greatest AC/DC songs.

== Personnel ==
AC/DC

- Brian Johnson – lead vocals
- Angus Young – lead guitar
- Malcolm Young – rhythm guitar, backing vocals
- Cliff Williams – bass guitar, backing vocals
- Phil Rudd – drums

Production

- Robert John "Mutt" Lange – production, backing vocals

== Charts ==
Year	Chart	Peak position
1980	France (IFOP)	16
1981
1981	Australian (Kent Music Report)	7
1981	Germany (GfK)	25
1981	US Mainstream Rock (Billboard)	50
2012	Austria (Ö3 Austria Top 40)	49
2012	Canada Digital Song Sales (Billboard)	39
2012	France (SNEP)	43
2012	Germany (GfK)	25
2012	US Digital Song Sales (Billboard)	51
2015	Switzerland (Schweizer Hitparade)	61
2022	Hungary (Single Top 40)	32

== Certifications ==
Region	Certification	Certified units/sales
Brazil (Pro-Música Brasil)	Gold	30,000^{‡}
Canada (Music Canada)	4× Platinum	320,000^{‡}
Denmark (IFPI Danmark)	Gold	45,000^{‡}
Germany (BVMI)	Platinum	600,000^{‡}
Italy (FIMI)	Gold	25,000^{‡}
Mexico (AMPROFON)	2× Platinum	120,000^{‡}
New Zealand (RMNZ)	2× Platinum	60,000^{‡}
Spain (Promusicae)	Gold	30,000^{‡}
United Kingdom (BPI)	Gold	400,000^{‡}
United States (RIAA)	3× Platinum	3,000,000^{‡}
Ringtone
Canada (Music Canada)	Gold	20,000^{*}
United States (RIAA)	Gold	500,000^{*}
^{*} Sales figures based on certification alone.^{‡} Sales+streaming figures based on certification alone.

== Use in sports ==
"Hells Bells" was used as the entrance music for former Major League Baseball (MLB) player Trevor Hoffman at home games from 1998 to 2010.

The song is played prior to every New Jersey Devils home game as the players come out on the ice.

The German football club FC St. Pauli from Hamburg, French rugby club RC Toulonnais from Toulon and Greek football club PAOK FC from Thessaloniki open all home matches walking out to "Hells Bells", the former often with large fan displays and pyrotechnics.

The Fremantle Dockers in the AFL use Hells Bells as a signal to their home fans to activate "Wharfie Time"; a crowd engagement boost to help push their team in the last quarter during a close match.

The Detroit Lions use this song at home games when their opponents face third down.

== In film ==
The song is heard in the movie Deadpool & Wolverine, when they first fight in the Void.
