= Back in Black =

1980 studio album by AC/DC

Studio album by AC/DC
- Released: 25 July 1980
- Recorded: April–May 1980
- Studio: Compass Point (Nassau)
- Genre: Hard rock
- Length: 42:11
- Labels: Albert; Atlantic
- Producer: Mutt Lange

AC/DC chronology
Highway to Hell (1979)	Back in Black (1980)	For Those About to Rock We Salute You (1981)

Singles from Back in Black
- 1. "You Shook Me All Night Long" Released: 15 August 1980; 2. "Hells Bells" Released: 31 October 1980 (EU); 3. "Rock and Roll Ain't Noise Pollution" Released: 7 November 1980 (UK); 4. "Back in Black" Released: December 1980 (US)

Back in Black is the seventh studio album by Australian rock band AC/DC, released on 25 July 1980, by Albert Productions and Atlantic Records. It was the band's first album to feature Brian Johnson as lead singer, following the death of their previous vocalist Bon Scott. After the commercial breakthrough of their 1979 album Highway to Hell, AC/DC was planning to record a follow-up, but in February 1980, Scott died from alcohol poisoning after a night out in London. The remaining members of the group considered disbanding, but ultimately chose to continue on and recruited Johnson, who had previously been the vocalist for Geordie.

The album was composed by Johnson and brothers Angus and Malcolm Young, and recorded over seven weeks in the Bahamas from April to May 1980 with producer Robert John "Mutt" Lange, who had also produced Highway to Hell. Following its completion, the group mixed Back in Black at Electric Lady Studios in New York City. The album's all-black cover was designed as a "sign of mourning" for Scott.

Back in Black was an unprecedented commercial and critical success. It has sold an estimated 50 million copies worldwide, making it the second-best-selling album in music history. AC/DC supported the album with a yearlong world tour that cemented them among the most popular music acts of the early 1980s. It has since been included on numerous "greatest albums" lists. On 21 August 2024, the album was certified 27× Platinum by the Recording Industry Association of America, making it the third-best-selling album in the United States and the best-selling album that never reached the top spot on the American charts.

== Background ==
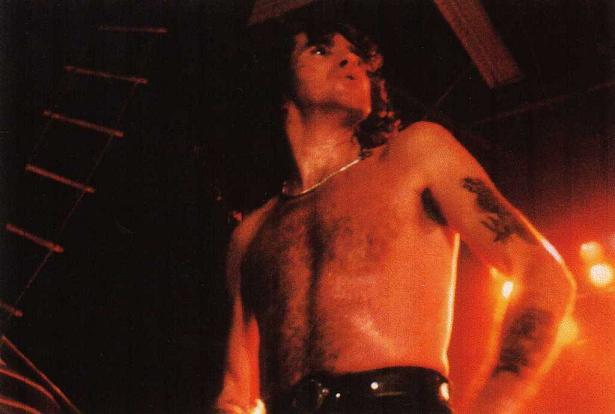
Bon Scott, the band's former vocalist, in December 1979

Formed in 1973, AC/DC first broke into international markets in 1977 with their fourth album, Let There Be Rock, and by 1979 they were poised for greater success with their sixth studio album, Highway to Hell. Producer Robert John "Mutt" Lange helped to make the band's sound more catchy and accessible, and Highway to Hell became their first gold album in the United States, selling over 500,000 copies, while also peaking at number 17 on that country's pop charts and number eight in the United Kingdom.

As the new decade approached, the group set off for the UK and France for the final leg of the Highway to Hell Tour, planning to begin recording their next album shortly after playing those dates. On 19 February 1980, vocalist Bon Scott went on a drinking binge in a London pub that caused him to lose consciousness, so a friend let him rest in the back of his Renault 5 overnight. The next morning, Scott was found unresponsive and rushed to King's College Hospital, where medical personnel pronounced him dead on arrival. The coroner ruled that pulmonary aspiration of vomit was the cause of Scott's death, but the official cause was listed on the death certificate as "acute alcoholic poisoning" and classified as "death by misadventure". Scott was cremated, and his ashes were inurned by his family at Fremantle Cemetery in Fremantle, Western Australia. The loss devastated the band, who considered breaking up, but friends and family (particularly Scott's) persuaded them to carry on.

After Scott's funeral on 1 March, the band immediately began auditions for a replacement frontman. At the advice of Lange, they brought in Geordie singer Brian Johnson, who impressed the group. The band begrudgingly worked through the rest of the list of applicants in the following days, and then brought Johnson back for a second rehearsal. On 29 March, to Johnson's surprise, Malcolm Young called the singer to offer him the job.

== Recording and production ==
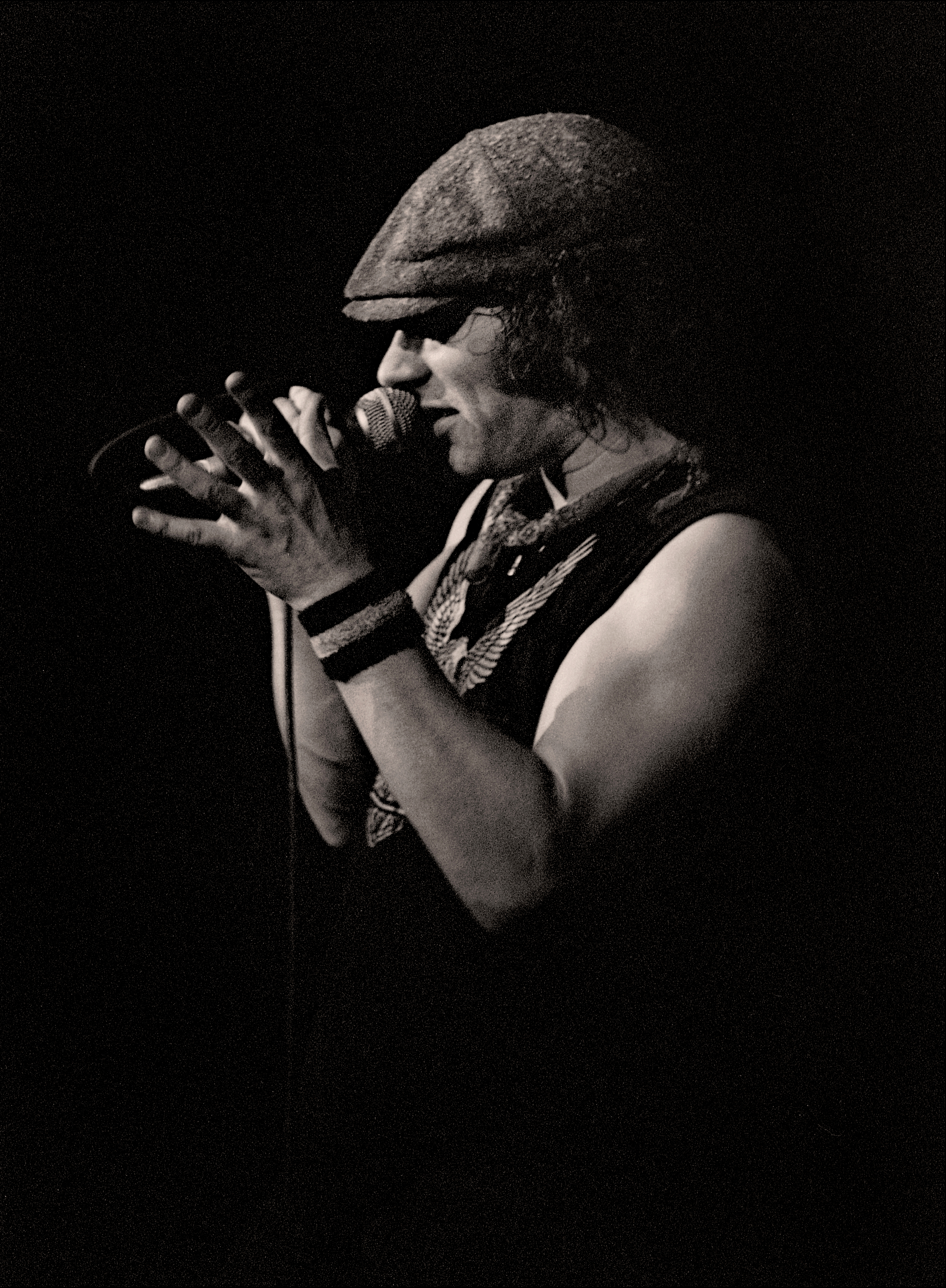
Back in Black was the first AC/DC album to feature Brian Johnson (pictured in 1982) as lead singer.

As AC/DC commenced writing new material for the followup to Highway to Hell, vocalist Bon Scott, who began his career as a drummer with The Spektors, played the drums on demo recordings of "Let Me Put My Love into You" and "Have a Drink on Me". In a 2021 interview with Paste, Angus Young claimed this was the full extent of Scott's contributions to Back in Black (though, at this point, he said the demos on which Scott played drums were of "Hells Bells" and "Have a Drink on Me").

Three weeks of rehearsals for Back in Black were scheduled at London's E-Zee Hire Studios, but the rehearsals were cut to one week when an opening came up at Compass Point Studios in Nassau, in the Bahamas. Although the band had wanted to record their next effort in the UK, there were no studios available, and the Bahamas presented a nice tax advantage, so Back in Black was recorded at Compass Point from mid-April to May 1980 with producer "Mutt" Lange. Johnson recalled that "It was hardly any kind of studio, we were in these little concrete cells, comfy mind, you had a bed and a chair. And this big old black lady ran the whole place. Oh, she was fearsome, she ruled that place with a rod of iron. We had to lock the doors at night because she'd warned us about these Haitians who'd come down at night and rob the place. So she bought us all these six-foot fishing spears to keep at the fucking door! It was a bit of a stretch from Newcastle, I can tell you."

Around the time of the band's arrival in the Bahamas, the area was hit by several tropical storms, which wreaked havoc on the electricity at Compass Point. Johnson referenced the bad weather on the opening lines of "Hells Bells": "I'm rolling thunder, pourin' rain. I'm comin' on like a hurricane. My lightning's flashing across the sky. You're only young but you're gonna die." In addition, some of the group's equipment was initially held up by customs, while other gear was slowly freighted over from the UK.

Having never recorded with the group, Johnson felt pressure during the process, and he also reported having trouble adjusting to the environment. Lange focused particular attention on Johnson's vocals, demanding perfection out of each take.

It was like, 'Again, Brian, again – hold on, you sang that note too long so there's no room for a breath'. He wouldn't let anything go past him. He had this thing where he didn't want people to listen to the album down the road and say there's no way someone could sing that, they've dropped that in, even the breaths had to be in the right place. And you cannot knock a man for that, but he drove me nuts. I'd be sitting there going, 'Arrggghh!'

— Brian Johnson

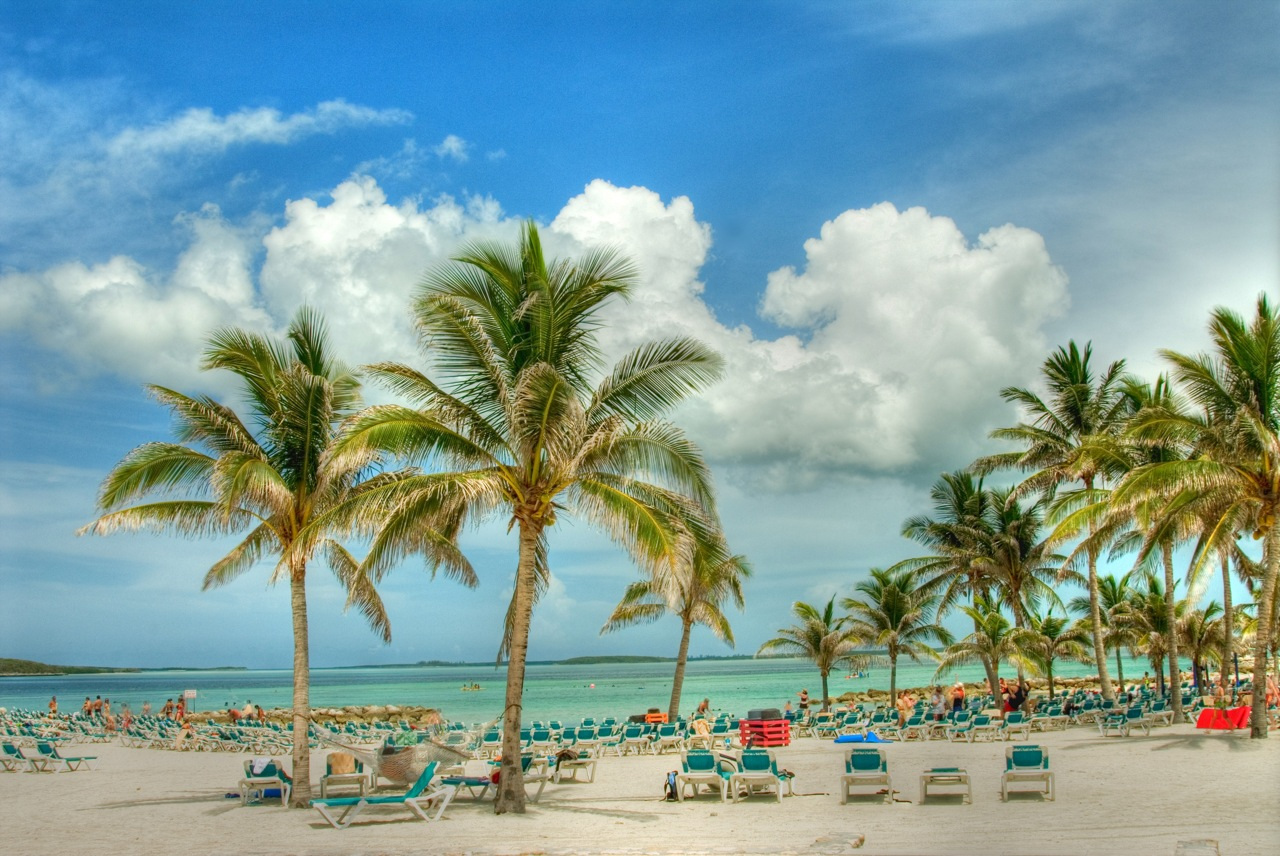
Back in Black was recorded in Nassau, the capital of The Bahamas

The general attitude during recording was optimistic, though engineer Tony Platt was dismayed to find the rooms at Compass Point were not sonically complementary to the group's sound, which was designed to be very dry and compact. A humorous anecdote from the sessions involved a take being interrupted by a crab shuffling across the studio's wooden floor. Angus Young's particular guitar sound on the album was achieved, in part, through the use of the Schaffer–Vega diversity system, a wireless guitar device designed by Ken Schaffer that provided a signal boost and was reissued as a separate guitar effect in 2014.

Near the end of the recording process, the band asked manager Ian Jeffery to find a bell to include on the album. Jeffery located a foundry to produce the bell, but, with seven weeks having already gone by, he suggested Platt instead record the bells of a nearby church. Platt did so, but these recordings did not suffice, due to the sound of a flurry of birds flying away that accompanied each peal of the bells. The foundry brought forward production on the bell, which turned out perfectly tuned, and it was recorded with Ronnie Lane's Mobile Studio. Following the completion of recording, Back in Black was mixed at Electric Lady Studios in New York City.

According to Angus Young, the album's all-black cover was a "sign of mourning" for Scott. Atlantic Records disliked the cover, but accepted it, on the condition that the band put a grey outline around the AC/DC logo.

== Release and promotion ==
Back in Black was first released in the United States on 25 July 1980. Its release in the United Kingdom and the rest of Europe followed on 31 July, and it was released in Australia on 11 August. The album was an immediate commercial success, debuting at number one on the British albums chart and reaching number four on the American chart, which Rolling Stone called "an exceptional showing for a heavy-metal album". It topped the British chart for two weeks, and remained in the top 10 of the American chart for more than five months. In Australia, the album reached number one on the ARIA Charts in March 1981.

After Back in Black was released, AC/DC's previous records Highway to Hell, If You Want Blood You've Got It, and Let There Be Rock all re-entered the British charts, which made them the first band since The Beatles to have four albums in the British Top 100 simultaneously. Back in Black's American success prompted Atlantic, the band's US record company, to release their 1976 album Dirty Deeds Done Dirt Cheap for the first time in the US, and in May 1981 Dirty Deeds reached number three on the US chart, surpassing Back in Black's peak position.

To promote the album, music videos were filmed for "You Shook Me All Night Long", "Hells Bells", the title track, "Rock and Roll Ain't Noise Pollution", "Let Me Put My Love into You", and "What Do You Do for Money Honey", though only the first four of those songs were released as singles. "You Shook Me All Night Long" became AC/DC's first Top 40 hit in the US, peaking at number 35 on the Billboard Hot 100.

On 21 August 2024, the album was certified 27× multi-platinum by the RIAA, denoting 27 million American sales. This placed it sixth on the list of the best-selling albums in the US. Worldwide, it has sold 50 million copies, leading Mark Beaumont of NME to call it "the biggest selling hard rock album ever made"; rock historian Brock Helander had previously called it "ostensibly the best-selling [...] heavy-metal album in history".

== Critical reception ==
Retrospective professional reviews
Review scores
Source	Rating
AllMusic	5/5 stars
Blender	5/5 stars
Christgau's Record Guide	B−
The Encyclopedia of Popular Music	4/5 stars
The Great Rock Discography	8/10
MusicHound Rock	5/5 stars
Pitchfork	8.8/10
Rolling Stone	5/5 stars
The Rolling Stone Album Guide	5/5 stars
Spin Alternative Record Guide	8/10

Reviewing the album for Rolling Stone in 1980, David Fricke regarded it as "not only the best of AC/DC's six American albums", but also "the apex of heavy-metal art: the first LP since Led Zeppelin II that captures all the blood, sweat and arrogance of the genre." Red Starr of Smash Hits was more critical, saying he found the songs indistinguishable from one another and marred by hypermasculine fantasies, rock music stock phrases, garish guitar, and dull rhythms, on "yet another triumph for lowest common denominator headbanging—the new thoroughly predictable, thoroughly dreadful AC/DC album", and gave Back in Black a score of 3 out of 10.

In a retrospective review, Rolling Stone critic Christian Hoard praised the album as the band's greatest work, possibly "the leanest and meanest record of all time—balls-out arena rock that punks could love." Barry Walters from Rolling Stone said Back in Black "still sounds thoroughly timeless, the essence of unrepentantly simple but savagely crafted hard rock" and called the album "a celebration of thrashing, animal sex", though he observed "mean-spirited sexism" on songs such as "What Do You Do for Money Honey" and "Given the Dog a Bone". Robert Christgau was less enthusiastic, writing in Christgau's Record Guide: The '80s (1990) that he found the band somewhat too "primitive" and their sexual imagery "unimaginative", and that, on the album, "Angus Young does come up with killer riffs, though not as consistently as a refined person like myself might hope, and lead singer Brian Johnson sings like there's a cattle prod at his scrotum, just the thing for fans who can't decide whether their newfound testosterone is agony or ecstasy."

Writing in 2011, Kitty Empire of The Observer admitted the album is "a preposterous, drongoid record [...] built on casual sexism, eye-rolling double entendres, a highly questionable attitude to sexual consent ('Don't you struggle/ Don't you fight/ Don't you worry/ Cos it's your turn tonight') a penchant for firearms, and a crass celebration of the unthinking macho hedonism that killed the band's original singer", but nonetheless concurred with Fricke's original view of the album as a heavy metal masterpiece and named it her favourite album ever, "the obsessive soundtrack of my adolescence, the racy middle-brow thriller that spoke to me both as a tomboy who wanted to be one of the guys, and the increasingly female ingenue who needed to work out the world of men. Plus teenagers love death."

The album is featured on many "best of" lists. Rolling Stone ranked it number 26 on their 1989 list of the "100 Best Albums of the Eighties", and number 73 on their 2003 list of "The 500 Greatest Albums of All Time" (it was number 77 on the 2012 revised list and number 84 on the 2020 list), while the title track was ranked number 190 on their list of the "500 Greatest Songs of All Time". VH1 ranked Back in Black number 82 on their 2001 list of the "Top 100 Albums", and the title track was ranked number 2 on their list of the "100 Greatest Hard Rock Songs". Q ranked the album number 9 on their 2006 list of the "40 Best Albums of the '80s", Time included it in their 2010 "All-TIME 100 Albums" list, and Rolling Stone Australia ranked it number one on their December 2021 list of the "200 Greatest Australian Albums of All Time". In 2005, the album was included in the book 1001 Albums You Must Hear Before You Die, and it was listed at number 2 in the 2010 book 100 Best Australian Albums. Apple Music listed Back in Black as 90th pick for their 100 Best Albums list in 2024.

== Legacy and influence ==
Back in Black is considered by many contemporary critics to be an influential hard rock and heavy metal album. According to Tim Jonze of The Guardian, it has been hailed by some as "a high watermark" for heavy metal music. NME regarded it as an important release in 1980s metal and heavy rock, naming it one of the 20 best metal albums of its decade, while The Daily Telegraph ranked it as one of the 20 greatest heavy metal albums of all time. Paul Brannigan of Metal Hammer cited it as one of the ten albums that helped reestablish the genre's global popularity in 1980, which he called "the greatest year for heavy metal". In 2005, it was ranked number one on Rock Hard's list of the "500 Greatest Rock & Metal Albums of All Time". In 2024, Loudwire staff elected it as the best hard rock album of 1980.

According to rock journalist Joe S. Harrington, Back in Black was released at a time when heavy metal stood at a turning point between a decline and a revival, as most bands in the genre were playing slower tempos and longer guitar solos, while AC/DC and Van Halen adopted punk rock's "high-energy implications" and "constricted their songs into more pop-oriented blasts". Harrington credited producer Lange for drawing AC/DC further away from the blues-oriented rock of their previous albums, and toward a more dynamic attack that concentrated and harmonised each element of the band: "the guitars were compacted into a singular statement of rhythmic efficiency, the rhythm section provided the thunderhorse overdrive, and vocalist Johnson belowed and brayed like the most unhinged practitioner of bluesy top-man dynamics since vintage Robert Plant." The resulting music, along with contemporaneous records by Motörhead and Ozzy Osbourne, helped revitalise and reintroduce metal to a younger generation of listeners, "eventually resulting in the punk-metal crossover personified by Metallica and others." In 1,000 Recordings to Hear Before You Die (2008), Tom Moon said Back in Black's "lean mean arena rock" and the production's "delicate balance of power and finesse [...] defined the commercial side of heavy music for years after its release."

Lange's production for the album has had an enduring impact in the music industry. Harrington wrote that "to this day, producers still use it as the de facto paint-by-numbers guidebook for how a hard-rock record should sound", and, in the years after its release, studios in Nashville would use it to check the acoustics of a room, while Motörhead would use it to tune their sound system. American death metal group Six Feet Under recorded a cover of the entire album under the title Graveyard Classics 2.

=== Lyrics controversy ===
Five months after Bon Scott's death, AC/DC finished the work they had begun with him; they released Back in Black as a tribute to him, but his name did not appear in the writing credits. The issue of whether Scott's lyrics were used, uncredited, on the album remains an enduring topic of debate and was a major focus of Jesse Fink's biography of Scott, Bon: The Last Highway.

In the book, Scott's girlfriend Margaret "Silver" Smith (died 2006) told Fink that Scott called her on the evening before his death to invite her out to celebrate writing lyrics for Back in Black. Smith told Fink, "I've never sat down and listened to [Back in Black] but the night that he died that was why he wanted to go out. He'd finished [the lyrics]. I'd been around for the writing of a few albums by then so he knew that I knew what his pattern was. He would write away from the band. If they were in the studio he'd be up in the kitchen, a couple of floors away or something; pretty much just stay there by himself ... that's why he wanted to go out. 'I've finally bloody finished it. It's done.'"

Fink also produced quotes from Scott's ex-bandmate in Australian band The Valentines, Vince Lovegrove, who stated that Scott's family receives royalties for Back in Black. Another girlfriend of Scott's, "Holly X" (a pseudonym), also claims Scott wrote the song "You Shook Me All Night Long".

Fink also revealed past interview quotes from Angus Young, in some of which he admitted that Scott's lyrics were at least partly used, and others in which he denied it. In a 1991 interview with Kerrang! magazine, Young was asked by journalist Paul Elliott, "Who wrote the lyrics on ['Given The Dog A Bone'] and the others on Back in Black? Bon, or Brian, or both?" Young replied, "Bon wrote a little of the stuff." He also stated to Rolling Stone in 1998, "We had songs that he had written and we wanted to finish the songs." However, in other interviews in 1981, 1996, 1998 and 2000, Young denied that any lyrics on the album were written by Scott. In 2005, he said, "There was nothing [on Back in Black] from Bon's notebook."

However, senior vice-president of Atlantic Records in London from 1968 to 1985, Phil Carson, tells Fink in the same book, "[Johnson] wrote all the lyrics. It's fucking stupid to say anything else."

The official credits on the album were and remain "Young/Young/Johnson". In 2022, Johnson released his autobiography, The Lives of Brian, and denied Scott had written lyrics for Back in Black. He stated, "The conspiracy theories are legion – usually started by people who think they know but weren't there... it was me at the end of the pen, writing every night and every morning, with only the title to work with. That's what happened. That's the truth and I really hope that settles it." Johnson made particular reference to writing the lyrics to "You Shook Me All Night Long", "Have a Drink on Me", "Hells Bells" and "Back in Black", and stated that he was given nothing more than a riff and a title to work with. He also said that the title of the song "Rock 'n' Roll Ain't Noise Pollution" had come directly from a story Scott had told the rest of the band.

== Track listing ==
All tracks are written by Angus Young, Malcolm Young, and Brian Johnson.

Side one
No.	Title	Length
1.	"Hells Bells"	5:10
2.	"Shoot to Thrill"	5:17
3.	"What Do You Do for Money Honey"	3:33
4.	"Givin the Dog a Bone" ( (Note: According to the official AC/DC website and most worldwide releases, track four was originally "Given the Dog a Bone". On some albums, particular Australian releases, and also in the iTunes Store, it is sometimes shown as either "Giving the Dog a Bone" or "Givin the Dog a Bone". The band's official website later changed the title of the song to "Givin the Dog a Bone", with no apostrophe.))	3:30
5.	"Let Me Put My Love into You"	4:16

Side two
No.	Title	Length
6.	"Back in Black"	4:15
7.	"You Shook Me All Night Long"	3:30
8.	"Have a Drink on Me"	3:57
9.	"Shake a Leg"	4:06
10.	"Rock and Roll Ain't Noise Pollution"	4:15
Total length:		42:11

== Personnel ==
Personnel taken from Back in Black liner notes, and Sound on Sound.

=== AC/DC ===
- Brian Johnson – lead vocals
- Angus Young – lead guitar
- Malcolm Young – rhythm guitar, backing vocals
- Cliff Williams – bass guitar, backing vocals
- Phil Rudd – drums

=== Production ===
- Robert John "Mutt" Lange – production, backing vocals
- Tony Platt – engineering
- Benji Armbrister – assistant engineering
- Jack Newber – assistant engineering
- Brad Samuelsohn – mixing
- Bob Ludwig – mastering (original LP release)
- Barry Diament – mastering (original CD release)
- Ted Jensen – remastering (EMI/Atco reissue)
- George Marino – remastering (Epic reissue)
- Bob Defrin – art direction
- Robert Ellis – photography

== Charts ==
=== Weekly charts ===
Weekly chart performance for Back in Black
Chart (1980–2024)	Peak position
Australian Albums (Kent Music Report)	1
Austrian Albums (Ö3 Austria)	6
Canada Top Albums/CDs (RPM)	1
Danish Albums (Hitlisten)	27
Dutch Albums (Album Top 100)	27
Finnish Albums (Suomen virallinen lista)	9
French Albums (IFOP)	1
German Albums (Offizielle Top 100)	1
Hungarian Physical Albums (MAHASZ)	13
New Zealand Albums (RMNZ)	24
Norwegian Albums (VG-lista)	8
Polish Albums (ZPAV)	39
Spanish Albums (Promusicae)	33
Swedish Albums (Sverigetopplistan)	12
Swiss Albums (Schweizer Hitparade)	3
UK Albums (Official Charts)	1
UK Rock & Metal Albums (Official Charts)	1
US Billboard 200	4
US Top Rock Albums (Billboard)	6

=== Year-end charts ===
1980 year-end chart performance for Back in Black
Chart (1980)	Position
France (IFOP)	2
German Albums (Offizielle Top 100)	37

1981 year-end chart performance for Back in Black
Chart (1981)	Position
Australia (Kent Music Report)	3
Canada Top Albums/CDs (RPM)	9
German Albums (Offizielle Top 100)	5
US Billboard 200	7

2002 year-end chart performance for Back in Black
Chart (2002)	Position
Canadian Metal Albums (Nielsen SoundScan)	58

2015 year-end chart performance for Back in Black
Chart (2015)	Position
US Billboard 200	114

2016 year-end chart performance for Back in Black
Chart (2016)	Position
US Billboard 200	160

2017 year-end chart performance for Back in Black
Chart (2017)	Position
US Top Rock Albums (Billboard)	39

2018 year-end chart performance for Back in Black
Chart (2018)	Position
US Billboard 200	189
US Top Rock Albums (Billboard)	20

2019 year-end chart performance for Back in Black
Chart (2019)	Position
US Billboard 200	125
US Top Rock Albums (Billboard)	21

2020 year-end chart performance for Back in Black
Chart (2020)	Position
Swedish Albums (Sverigetopplistan)	84
US Billboard 200	89
US Top Rock Albums (Billboard)	9

2021 year-end chart performance for Back in Black
Chart (2021)	Position
Icelandic Albums (Tónlistinn)	84
Swedish Albums (Sverigetopplistan)	75
US Billboard 200	68
US Top Rock Albums (Billboard)	7

2022 year-end chart performance for Back in Black
Chart (2022)	Position
US Billboard 200	84
US Top Rock Albums (Billboard)	10

2023 year-end chart performance for Back in Black
Chart (2023)	Position
US Billboard 200	140
US Top Rock Albums (Billboard)	32

2024 year-end chart performance of Back in Black
Chart (2024)	Position
Austrian Albums (Ö3 Austria)	67
German Albums (Offizielle Top 100)	41
Icelandic Albums (Tónlistinn)	88
Swedish Albums (Sverigetopplistan)	68
US Billboard 200	162

2025 year-end chart performance of Back in Black
Chart (2025)	Position
Swedish Albums (Sverigetopplistan)	75

== Certifications ==
Certifications for Back in Black
Region	Certification	Certified units/sales
Argentina (CAPIF)	3× Platinum	180,000^{^}
Australia (ARIA)	12× Platinum	920,000
Austria (IFPI Austria)	Platinum	50,000^{*}
Brazil (Pro-Música Brasil)	Gold	100,000^{‡}
Canada (Music Canada)	Diamond	1,000,000^{^}
Denmark (IFPI Danmark)	3× Platinum	60,000^{‡}
France (SNEP)	2× Platinum	600,000^{*}
Germany (BVMI)	2× Platinum	1,000,000^{^}
Italy (FIMI) sales since 2009	4× Platinum	200,000^{‡}
New Zealand (RMNZ)	6× Platinum	90,000^{‡}
Poland (ZPAV)	3× Platinum	60,000^{‡}
Spain (Promusicae)	Gold	50,000^{^}
Switzerland (IFPI Switzerland)	2× Platinum	100,000^{^}
United Kingdom (BPI)	2× Platinum	600,000^{‡}
United States (RIAA)	27× Platinum	27,000,000^{‡}
^{*} Sales figures based on certification alone.^{^} Shipments figures based on certification alone.^{‡} Sales+streaming figures based on certification alone.

== See also ==
- List of 1980s albums considered the best
- List of best-selling albums
- List of best-selling albums in Australia
- List of best-selling albums in France
- List of best-selling albums in the United States
- List of diamond-certified albums in Canada
- List of number-one albums in Australia during the 1980s
- List of Top 25 albums for 1980 in Australia
- List of Canadian number-one albums of 1981
- List of UK Albums Chart number ones of the 1980s
