= Blow Up Your Video World Tour =

1988 concert tour by AC/DC

- Tour by AC/DC
- Poster to the concert in Brussels, Belgium
- Location: Australia; Europe; North America
- Associated album: Blow Up Your Video
- Start date: 1 February 1988
- End date: 13 November 1988
- Legs: 3
- No. of shows: 164

AC/DC concert chronology
- Who Made Who Tour (1986); Blow Up Your Video World Tour (1988); Razors Edge World Tour (1990–1991)

The Blow Up Your Video World Tour was a concert tour by the Australian rock band AC/DC, which had 5 legs spreading over the course of 10 months starting on 1 February 1988 in Perth, Australia, finishing on 13 November 1988 in Inglewood, California.

== Background ==
This tour would be the last to feature drummer Simon Wright, before being replaced by Chris Slade in 1989. The tour also saw Malcolm Young step out from the North American legs due to an alcohol problem. During this period, he was replaced by his nephew (and subsequent permanent replacement in 2014), Stevie Young. This was AC/DC's last tour and studio album during the 1980s, and it put them back in the limelight after a small streak of commercially disappointing albums.

Every show on the North American leg of the tour began with a heatseeking missile pod rising up into the stage; as the band would open with the song "Heatseeker", off the Blow Up Your Video album.

== Reception ==
Aaron Roberts from the Observer Reporter gave the performance in Pittsburgh a positive review. He opened his review, stating that the energetic band treated the screaming teenage audience to non-stop rock and roll which he claimed was rare in the age of high-tech shows, as Brian Johnson got the audience involved in nearly every song, even the old favorites. He noted that there were mixing problems present earlier at the show, but had gone unnoticed by the audience. He concluded his review, stating that if someone was interested in hear well-performed rock and roll, they need to go and see AC/DC.

== Tour dates ==
List of 1988 concerts, showing date, city, country and venue
Date	City	Country	Venue
1 February 1988	Perth	Australia	Perth Entertainment Centre
2 February 1988	Perth	Australia	Perth Entertainment Centre
5 February 1988	Melbourne	Australia	National Tennis Centre
6 February 1988	Melbourne	Australia	National Tennis Centre
7 February 1988	Melbourne	Australia	National Tennis Centre
8 February 1988	Melbourne	Australia	National Tennis Centre
11 February 1988	Sydney	Australia	Sydney Entertainment Centre
12 February 1988	Sydney	Australia	Sydney Entertainment Centre
13 February 1988	Sydney	Australia	Sydney Entertainment Centre
14 February 1988	Sydney	Australia	Sydney Entertainment Centre
17 February 1988	Adelaide	Australia	Globe Derby Park
19 February 1988	Sydney	Australia	Sydney Entertainment Centre
21 February 1988	Boondall	Australia	Brisbane Entertainment Centre
22 February 1988	Boondall	Australia	Brisbane Entertainment Centre
7 March 1988	Birmingham	England	National Exhibition Centre (Note: One of the shows was filmed as part of their "That's the Way I Wanna Rock 'n' Roll" music video.)
8 March 1988	Birmingham	England	National Exhibition Centre
9 March 1988	Birmingham	England	National Exhibition Centre
11 March 1988	London	England	Wembley Arena
12 March 1988	London	England	Wembley Arena
13 March 1988	London	England	Wembley Arena
15 March 1988	Arnhem	Netherlands	Rijnhal
16 March 1988	Brussels	Belgium	Forest National
18 March 1988	Hamburg	West Germany	Alsterdorfer Sporthalle
19 March 1988	Malmö	Sweden	Isstadion
21 March 1988	Drammen	Norway	Drammenshallen
23 March 1988	Helsinki	Finland	Helsinki Ice Hall
25 March 1988	Stockholm	Sweden	Isstadion
26 March 1988	Gothenburg	Sweden	Scandinavium
28 March 1988	West Berlin	West Germany	Eissporthalle
29 March 1988	Oldenburg	West Germany	Weser-Ems-Halle
30 March 1988	Frankfurt	West Germany	Festhalle Frankfurt
31 March 1988	Essen	West Germany	Grugahalle
2 April 1988	Cologne	West Germany	Sportshalle
3 April 1988	Hanover	West Germany	Niedersachsenhalle
4 April 1988	Karlsruhe	West Germany	Schwarzwaldhalle
6 April 1988	Paris	France	Le Zénith
8 April 1988	Würzburg	West Germany	Carl-Diem-Halle
9 April 1988	Lausanne	Switzerland	Halle Festis Beaulieu
10 April 1988	Munich	West Germany	Olympiahalle
11 April 1988	Stuttgart	West Germany	Hanns-Martin-Schleyer-Halle
13 April 1988	London	England	Wembley Arena
3 May 1988	Portland	United States	Cumberland County Civic Center
4 May 1988	Portland	United States	Cumberland County Civic Center
5 May 1988	Hartford	United States	Hartford Civic Center
6 May 1988	Worcester	United States	The Centrum
7 May 1988	Worcester	United States	The Centrum
9 May 1988	Philadelphia	United States	The Spectrum
11 May 1988	Ottawa	Canada	Ottawa Civic Centre
12 May 1988	Hamilton	Canada	Copps Coliseum
13 May 1988	Fort Wayne	United States	Allen County War Memorial Coliseum
14 May 1988	Detroit	United States	Joe Louis Arena
15 May 1988	Pittsburgh	United States	Civic Arena
17 May 1988	Binghamton	United States	Broome County Veterans Memorial Arena
18 May 1988	Providence	United States	Providence Civic Center
19 May 1988	Providence	United States	Providence Civic Center
20 May 1988	East Rutherford	United States	Meadowlands Arena
21 May 1988	Landover	United States	Capital Centre
22 May 1988	Hampton	United States	Hampton Coliseum
24 May 1988	Louisville	United States	Freedom Hall
25 May 1988	Indianapolis	United States	Market Square Arena
26 May 1988	Cincinnati	United States	Riverfront Coliseum
27 May 1988	Richfield	United States	Richfield Coliseum
28 May 1988	Richfield	United States	Richfield Coliseum
29 May 1988	Charlevoix	United States	Castle Farms
30 May 1988	Detroit	United States	Joe Louis Arena
31 May 1988	Toledo	United States	Toledo Sports Arena
1 June 1988	Peoria	United States	Peoria Civic Center
2 June 1988	St. Louis	United States	St. Louis Arena
3 June 1988	Madison	United States	Dane County Coliseum
4 June 1988	Bloomington	United States	Met Center
5 June 1988	Bloomington	United States	Met Center
7 June 1988	Winnipeg	Canada	Winnipeg Arena
9 June 1988	Saskatoon	Canada	Saskatchewan Place
10 June 1988	Edmonton	Canada	Northlands Coliseum
11 June 1988	Calgary	Canada	Scotiabank Saddledome
13 June 1988	Vancouver	Canada	BC Place
14 June 1988	Portland	United States	Portland Memorial Coliseum
15 June 1988	Spokane	United States	Spokane Coliseum
16 June 1988	Tacoma	United States	Tacoma Dome
18 June 1988	Mountain View	United States	Shoreline Amphitheatre
19 June 1988	Sacramento	United States	California State Fair
21 June 1988	Las Vegas	United States	Thomas & Mack Center
22 June 1988	Long Beach	United States	Long Beach Arena
23 June 1988	Long Beach	United States	Long Beach Arena
24 June 1988	Irvine	United States	Irvine Meadows
25 June 1988	San Diego	United States	San Diego Sports Arena
20 July 1988	Las Cruces	United States	Pan American Center
21 July 1988	Albuquerque	United States	Tingley Coliseum
22 July 1988	Tucson	United States	Tucson Convention Center
23 July 1988	Tempe	United States	ASU Activity Center
24 July 1988	Paradise	United States	Thomas & Mack Center
26 July 1988	Salt Lake City	United States	Salt Palace
27 July 1988	Casper	United States	Casper Events Center
28 July 1988	Denver	United States	McNichols Sports Arena
29 July 1988	Omaha	United States	Omaha Civic Auditorium
30 July 1988	Kansas City	United States	Kemper Arena
31 July 1988	Valley Center	United States	Kansas Coliseum
2 August 1988	Dallas	United States	Coca-Cola Starplex Amphitheatre
3 August 1988	Shreveport	United States	Hirsch Memorial Coliseum
5 August 1988	San Antonio	United States	San Antonio Convention Center
6 August 1988	Houston	United States	Lakewood Church Central Campus
7 August 1988	New Orleans	United States	Lakefront Arena
8 August 1988	Pensacola	United States	Pensacola Civic Center
9 August 1988	Pembroke	United States	Hollywood Sportatorium
10 August 1988	Tampa	United States	USF Sun Dome
11 August 1988	Miami	United States	Miami Arena
12 August 1988	Orlando	United States	Orange County Convention Center
13 August 1988	Jacksonville	United States	Jacksonville Memorial Coliseum
16 August 1988	Atlanta	United States	The Omni
17 August 1988	Memphis	United States	Mid-South Coliseum
18 August 1988	Little Rock	United States	Barton Coliseum
19 August 1988	Jackson	United States	Mississippi Coliseum
20 August 1988	Birmingham	United States	BJCC Coliseum
21 August 1988	Nashville	United States	Municipal Auditorium
22 August 1988	Huntsville	United States	Von Braun Civic Center
23 August 1988	Knoxville	United States	Thompson–Boling Arena
24 August 1988	Greensville	United States	Greenville Memorial Auditorium
25 August 1988	Charlotte	United States	Charlotte Coliseum
26 August 1988	Columbia	United States	Carolina Coliseum
27 August 1988	Greensboro	United States	Greensboro Coliseum
28 August 1988	Charleston	United States	Charleston Civic Center
30 August 1988	New York City	United States	Madison Square Garden
1 September 1988	Glens Falls	United States	Glens Falls Civic Center
2 September 1988	Springfield	United States	Springfield Civic Center
4 September 1988	Portland	United States	Cumberland County Civic Center
5 September 1988	Quebec City	Canada	Colisée de Québec
6 September 1988	Montreal	Canada	Montreal Forum
7 September 1988	Hamilton	Canada	Copps Coliseum
8 September 1988	Columbus	United States	Ohio Expo Center Coliseum
9 September 1988	Rosemont	United States	Rosemont Horizon
10 September 1988	East Troy	United States	Alpine Valley Music Theatre
11 September 1988	Dayton	United States	Hara Arena
4 October 1988	Glens Falls	United States	Glens Falls Civic Center
5 October 1988	Uniondale	United States	Nassau Veterans Memorial Coliseum
7 October 1988	Boston	United States	Boston Garden
8 October 1988	Philadelphia	United States	The Spectrum
9 October 1988	Buffalo	United States	Buffalo Memorial Auditorium
11 October 1988	Rochester	United States	Rochester Community War Memorial
13 October 1988	Toronto	Canada	Maple Leaf Gardens
15 October 1988	Wheeling	United States	Wheeling Civic Center
16 October 1988	Roanoke	United States	Roanoke Civic Center
17 October 1988	Baltimore	United States	Baltimore Arena
18 October 1988	Raleigh	United States	Reynolds Coliseum
20 October 1988	Tallahassee	United States	Leon County Civic Center
21 October 1988	Atlanta	United States	The Omni
22 October 1988	Lexington	United States	Rupp Arena
23 October 1988	Johnson City	United States	Freedom Hall Civic Center
25 October 1988	Cincinnati	United States	Riverfront Coliseum
28 October 1988	Little Rock	United States	Barton Coliseum
29 October 1988	Lake Charles	United States	Lake Charles Civic Center
30 October 1988	Austin	United States	Frank Erwin Center
31 October 1988	Lubbock	United States	Lubbock Municipal Coliseum
1 November 1988	Norman	United States	Lloyd Noble Center
3 November 1988	Cedar Rapids	United States	Five Seasons Center
4 November 1988	Ames	United States	Hilton Coliseum
6 November 1988	Denver	United States	McNichols Sports Arena
7 November 1988	Denver	United States	McNichols Sports Arena
9 November 1988	Boise	United States	BSU Pavilion
11 November 1988	Daly City	United States	Cow Palace
13 November 1988	Inglewood	United States	The Forum

== Personnel ==
- Angus Young – lead guitar
- Cliff Williams – bass guitar, backing vocals
- Malcolm Young – rhythm guitar, backing vocals (legs 1–2)
- Simon Wright – drums
- Brian Johnson – lead vocals

Additional musicians

- Stevie Young – rhythm guitar, backing vocals (leg 3)
