= Fly on the Wall Tour =

1985–1986 concert tour by AC/DC

- Tour by AC/DC
- Poster to the concerts in Europe
- Location: Europe; North America
- Associated album: Fly on the Wall
- Start date: 2 September 1985
- End date: 16 February 1986
- Legs: 2
- No. of shows: 86

AC/DC concert chronology
- Flick of the Switch Tour (1983–1985); Fly on the Wall Tour (1985–1986); Who Made Who Tour (1986)

The Fly on the Wall Tour was a concert tour by the Australian hard rock band AC/DC, in support of their tenth studio album Fly on the Wall, which was released on 28 June 1985.

== Background ==
The tour was split into two legs, an American leg starting on 2 September 1985 in Binghamton, New York and a European leg ending on 16 February 1986 in Copenhagen, Denmark. The tour was marked by protests from some groups who claimed AC/DC's music was connected to the Night Stalker murders, which resulted in the Costa Mesa show on the North American leg being cancelled, after another murder was reported by a man wearing a hat with the band's name on it. Yngwie Malmsteen's Rising Force was the opening act on this tour.

== Reception ==
Pete Bishop from the Pittsburgh Press who attended the Pittsburgh concert, opened his review with a headline, suggesting that the band could be losing their charge. He noted the differences between the concert and the other in 1983, detailing that cannons were not fired before performing "For Those About to Rock (We Salute You)", nor did Angus moon the audience or ride on a roadie's shoulders through the audience - as well as noting the low attendance of 7,065 fans compared to the 12,284 fans that attended in 1983. He also criticized the vocals of Johnson, who he said couldn't hit the highest note on "You Shook Me All Night Long". However, Bishop praised the band, noting that they radiated fun - adding that the band looked like they were having a good time on stage.

Jerry Spangler from the Deseret News gave the Salt Lake City performance a positive review, opening that the band delivered a one-two punch alongside the opening act Yngwie Malmsteen. He praised Angus Young's performance, whom Spangler stated had delivered a first-class party-time rock show at ear-splitting decibels as the band performed new songs from the album Fly on the Wall. He noted the audience, who were dancing and cheering, stating that they were not disappointed, loving every minute of the energy-packed show. With the band starting off with a sizzling performance, Spangler also noted that the band was milking the crowd for all it was worth, performing old and new songs to satisfy the metal-hungry crowd.

== Tour dates ==
List of 1985 concerts, showing date, city, country and venue
Date	City	Country	Venue
4 September 1985	Binghamton	United States	Broome County Veterans Memorial Arena
5 September 1985	Glen Falls	United States	Glens Falls Civic Center
6 September 1985	Worcester	United States	Worcester Centrum
7 September 1985	Philadelphia	United States	The Spectrum
8 September 1985	Erie	United States	Erie Civic Center
10 September 1985	Pittsburgh	United States	Pittsburgh Civic Arena
11 September 1985	Rochester	United States	Rochester Community War Memorial
12 September 1985	New Haven	United States	New Haven Coliseum
13 September 1985	Boston	United States	Boston Garden
14 September 1985	East Rutherford	United States	Meadowlands Arena
15 September 1985	Baltimore	United States	Baltimore Civic Center
17 September 1985	Hampton	United States	Hampton Coliseum
19 September 1985	Detroit	United States	Joe Louis Arena
20 September 1985	East Troy	United States	Alpine Valley Music Theatre
21 September 1985	Rosemont	United States	Rosemont Horizon
22 September 1985	Richfield	United States	Richfield Coliseum
23 September 1985	Toronto	Canada	Maple Leaf Gardens
25 September 1985	Trotwood	United States	Hara Arena
26 September 1985	Toledo	United States	Toledo Sports Arena
27 September 1985	Indianapolis	United States	Market Square Arena
28 September 1985	Cedar Rapids	United States	Five Seasons Center
29 September 1985	Bloomington	United States	Met Center
1 October 1985	Saginaw	United States	Wendler Arena
3 October 1985	Springfield	United States	Prairie Capital Convention Center
4 October 1985	Kansas City	United States	Kemper Arena
5 October 1985	Omaha	United States	Omaha Civic Auditorium
6 October 1985	Des Moines	United States	Veterans Memorial Auditorium
7 October 1985	St. Louis	United States	Kiel Auditorium
9 October 1985	Valley Center	United States	Kansas Coliseum
10 October 1985	Oklahoma City	United States	Myriad Convention Center
11 October 1985	Austin	United States	Frank Erwin Center
12 October 1985	Dallas	United States	Reunion Arena
13 October 1985	Houston	United States	Southern Star Amphitheater
14 October 1985	San Antonio	United States	San Antonio Convention Center
17 October 1985	Phoenix	United States	Phoenix Municipal Stadium
18 October 1985	Inglewood	United States	The Forum
19 October 1985	Oakland	United States	Oakland County Arena
20 October 1985	Reno	United States	Lawlor Events Center
23 October 1985	Salt Lake City	United States	Salt Palace
25 October 1985	Denver	United States	McNichols Sports Arena
26 October 1985	Albuquerque	United States	Tingley Coliseum
27 October 1985	El Paso	United States	El Paso County Coliseum
29 October 1985	Bloomington	United States	Met Center
5 November 1985	Lakeland	United States	Lakeland Civic Center
6 November 1985	Pembroke Pine	United States	Hollywood Sportatorium
7 November 1985	Jacksonville	United States	Jacksonville Coliseum
8 November 1985	Charlotte	United States	Bojangles' Coliseum
9 November 1985	Knoxville	United States	Civic Coliseum
11 November 1985	Biloxi	United States	Mississippi Coast Coliseum
14 November 1985	Louisville	United States	Commonwealth Convention Center
15 November 1985	Nashville	United States	Municipal Auditorium
16 November 1985	Atlanta	United States	Omni Coliseum
17 November 1985	Greensboro	United States	Greensboro Coliseum
19 November 1985	Washington, D.C.	United States	Washington Convention Center
20 November 1985	Bethlehem	United States	Stabler Arena
21 November 1985	Uniondale	United States	Nassau Coliseum
22 November 1985	Providence	United States	Providence Civic Center
24 November 1985	Portland	United States	Cumberland County Civic Center
2 December 1985	Saint Paul	United States	St. Paul Civic Center

List of 1986 concerts, showing date, city, country and venue
Date	City	Country	Venue
13 January 1986	Manchester	England	Manchester Apollo
14 January 1986	Whitley Bay	England	Whitley Bay Ice Rink
16 January 1986	London	England	Wembley Arena
17 January 1986	London	England	Wembley Arena
19 January 1986	Birmingham	England	National Exhibition Centre
20 January 1986	Birmingham	England	National Exhibition Centre
22 January 1986	Edinburgh	Scotland	Edinburgh Playhouse
23 January 1986	Edinburgh	Scotland	Edinburgh Playhouse
25 January 1986	Brussels	Belgium	Forest National
26 January 1986	Amsterdam	Netherlands	Jaap Edenhal
27 January 1986	Hamburg	West Germany	Ernst-Merck-Halle
29 January 1986	Essen	West Germany	Grugahalle
30 January 1986	Frankfurt	West Germany	Festhalle Frankfurt
31 January 1986	Cologne	West Germany	Sporthalle
1 February 1986	Munich	West Germany	Rudi-Sedlmayer-Halle
2 February 1986	Zürich	Switzerland	Hallenstadion
4 February 1986	Heidelberg	West Germany	Rhein-Neckar-Halle
5 February 1986	Stuttgart	West Germany	Sporthalle
6 February 1986	Neunkirchen am Brand	West Germany	Hemmerleinhalle
7 February 1986	Würzburg	West Germany	Carl-Diem-Halle
9 February 1986	Malmö	Sweden	Malmö Isstadion
10 February 1986	Drammen	Norway	Drammenshallen
12 February 1986	Helsinki	Finland	Helsinki Ice Hall
14 February 1986	Stockholm	Sweden	Johanneshovs Isstadion
15 February 1986	Gothenburg	Sweden	Scandinavium
16 February 1986	Copenhagen	Denmark	Falkoner Center

=== Cancelled dates ===
List of cancelled shows, showing date, city, country, venue and reason for cancellation
Date	City	Country	Venue	Reason
21 October 1985	Costa Mesa	United States	Pacific Amphitheater	—N/a

=== Box office score data ===
List of box office score data with date, city, venue, attendance, gross, references
Date (1985)	City	Venue	Attendance	Gross	Ref(s)
6 September	Worcester, United States	The Centrum	12,304	$161,265	
13 September	Boston, United States	Boston Garden	14,121 / 15,509	$186,144	
19 September	Detroit, United States	Joe Louis Arena	14,752	$221,280	
23 September	Toronto, Canada	Maple Leaf Gardens	11,039 / 13,500	$167,792	
29 September	Minneapolis, United States	Met Center	12,078 / 15,000	$160,501	

== Personnel ==
- Angus Young – lead guitar
- Cliff Williams – bass guitar, backing vocals
- Malcolm Young – rhythm guitar, backing vocals
- Simon Wright – drums
- Brian Johnson – lead vocals
