= Who Made Who World Tour =

1986 concert tour by AC/DC

Who Made Who Tour
- Tour by AC/DC
- Poster to the concert in Fort Worth, USA
- Location: North America
- Associated album: Who Made Who
- Start date: 30 July 1986
- End date: 20 September 1986
- Legs: 1
- No. of shows: 43

AC/DC concert chronology
- Fly on the Wall Tour (1985–1986); Who Made Who Tour (1986); Blow Up Your Video World Tour (1988)

The Who Made Who Tour was a concert tour by the Australian hard rock band AC/DC, in support of their soundtrack album, Who Made Who, which was released on 26 May 1986.

== Background ==
The tour took place in North America, beginning in New Orleans on 30 July 1986 and ending in Uniondale, New York on 20 September. Queensrÿche were the opening act at some shows on this tour, before being replaced by Loudness.

== Reception ==
Sharon Liveten from Billboard opened their review, stating that AC/DC continued to be one of heavy metal's most popular touring acts which proved itself still capable of delivering the goods, with the band bringing in renewed energy and life to their classic songs. However, Liveten had criticized that the band could have used a little more theatrical spice, as well as songs dragging on a lot longer than they should have.

Martin Siberok, a reporter from the Montreal Gazette, opened their review with a headline that the band had "KOed" fans, in which it had unleashed the 'true headbanger' in fans. He noted into Angus Young's interactions with the fans to keep their attention, with the band's ordinariness creating a bond between both the band and the audience in attendance with ear bleeding sound and sheer power. He later concluded his review, stating that AC/DC scored high with energy and excitement.

== Tour dates ==
List of 1986 concerts, showing date, city, country, venue and opening act
Date	City	Country	Venue	Opening act
30 July 1986	New Orleans	United States	UNO Lakefront Arena	Queensrÿche
31 July 1986	New Orleans	United States	UNO Lakefront Arena	Queensrÿche
1 August 1986	Shreveport	United States	Hirsch Memorial Coliseum	Queensrÿche
2 August 1986	Little Rock	United States	Barton Coliseum	Queensrÿche
3 August 1986	Kansas City	United States	Kemper Arena	Queensrÿche
5 August 1986	Fort Worth	United States	Tarrant County Convention Center	Queensrÿche
6 August 1986	Houston	United States	The Summit	Queensrÿche
7 August 1986	San Antonio	United States	HemisFair Arena	Queensrÿche
9 August 1986	Tucson	United States	Tucson Convention Center	Queensrÿche
10 August 1986	Phoenix	United States	Compton Terrace Amphitheater	Queensrÿche
11 August 1986	Paradise	United States	Thomas & Mack Center	Queensrÿche
12 August 1986	San Diego	United States	San Diego Sports Arena	Queensrÿche
13 August 1986	Laguna Hills	United States	Irvine Meadows Amphitheatre	Queensrÿche
15 August 1986	Daly City	United States	Cow Palace	Queensrÿche
16 August 1986	Sacramento	United States	Cal Expo Amphitheatre	Queensrÿche
18 August 1986	Portland	United States	Portland Memorial Coliseum	Queensrÿche
19 August 1986	Tacoma	United States	Tacoma Dome	Queensrÿche
20 August 1986	Spokane	United States	Spokane Coliseum	Queensrÿche
22 August 1986	Calgary	Canada	Olympic Saddledome	Queensrÿche
23 August 1986	Edmonton	Canada	Northlands Coliseum	Queensrÿche
25 August 1986	Winnipeg	Canada	Winnipeg Arena	Queensrÿche
26 August 1986	Bismarck	United States	Bismarck Civic Center	Queensrÿche
27 August 1986	Rapid City	United States	Rushmore Plaza Civic Center	Queensrÿche
28 August 1986	Sioux Falls	United States	Sioux Falls Arena	Queensrÿche
29 August 1986	Bloomington	United States	Met Center	Queensrÿche
30 August 1986	East Troy	United States	Alpine Valley Music Theatre	Queensrÿche
1 September 1986	Kalamazoo	United States	Wings Stadium	Queensrÿche
3 September 1986	St. Louis	United States	Kiel Auditorium	Loudness
4 September 1986	Hoffman Estates	United States	Poplar Creek Music Theater	Loudness
5 September 1986	Indianapolis	United States	Market Square Arena	Loudness
6 September 1986	Thornville	United States	Buckeye Lake Music Center	Loudness
9 September 1986	Cincinnati	United States	Riverbend Music Center	Loudness
10 September 1986	Cuyahoga Falls	United States	Blossom Music Center	Loudness
11 September 1986	Detroit	United States	Joe Louis Arena	Loudness
12 September 1986	Toronto	Canada	Exhibition Stadium	Loudness
13 September 1986	Montreal	Canada	Montreal Forum	Loudness
14 September 1986	Portland	United States	Cumberland County Civic Center	Loudness
15 September 1986	Philadelphia	United States	The Spectrum	Loudness
16 September 1986	Philadelphia	United States	The Spectrum	Loudness
17 September 1986	Worcester	United States	The Centrum	Loudness
18 September 1986	Worcester	United States	The Centrum	Loudness
19 September 1986	Providence	United States	Providence Civic Center	Loudness
20 September 1986	Uniondale	United States	Nassau Veterans Memorial Coliseum	Loudness

=== Box office score data ===
List of box office score data with date, city, venue, attendance, gross, references
Date (1986)	City	Venue	Attendance	Gross	Ref(s)
31 July	New Orleans, United States	Lakefront Arena	8,631	$129,465	
1 August	Shreveport, United States	Hirsch Memorial Coliseum	10,000	$145,000	
2 August	Little Rock, United States	Barton Coliseum	10,000	$150,000	
5 August	Fort Worth, United States	Tarrant County Convention Center	10,926 / 13,956	$157,620	
6 August	Houston, United States	The Summit	9,772 / 17,000	$147,625	
7 August	San Antonio, United States	Hemisfair Arena	8,908 / 12,200	$123,485	
9 August	Tucson, United States	Community Center	8,508	$123,900	
11 August	Las Vegas, United States	Thomas & Mack Center	8,358 / 11,845	$121,530	
12 August	San Diego, United States	Sports Arena	12,176	$190,000	
13 August	Laguna Hills, United States	Irvine Meadows Amphitheatre	15,000	$225,570	
15 August	San Francisco, United States	Cow Palace	14,500	$232,747	
16 August	Sacramento, United States	Cal Expo Grandstand	10,496 / 12,200	$173,185	
20 September	Uniondale, United States	Nassau Veterans Memorial Coliseum	14,001 / 15,000	$224,906	

== Personnel ==
- Angus Young – lead guitar
- Cliff Williams – bass guitar, backing vocals
- Malcolm Young – rhythm guitar, backing vocals
- Simon Wright – drums
- Brian Johnson – lead vocals
