= For Those About to Rock Tour =

1981–1982 concert tour by AC/DC

- Tour by AC/DC
- Poster to the concert in Los Angeles, USA
- Location: Asia; Europe; North America
- Associated album: For Those About to Rock We Salute You
- Start date: 14 November 1981
- End date: 12 December 1982
- Legs: 3
- No. of shows: 90

AC/DC concert chronology
- Back in Black Tour (1980–1981); For Those About to Rock Tour (1981–1982); Flick of the Switch Tour (1983–1985)

The For Those About to Rock Tour (also known as the Cannon and Bell Tour) was a concert tour by the Australian hard rock band AC/DC, in support of their eighth studio album, For Those About to Rock We Salute You, which was released on 20 November 1981.

== Background ==
The For Those About to Rock Tour began with a North American leg in November 1981, with Japan and European legs throughout 1982. It was the first tour to feature two cannons on stage, which appeared during the band's encore, though it was not used at every show due to some venues refusing to let them use them.

It was the last tour to feature Phil Rudd on drums, due to issues regarding his addictions to drinking and drugs, as well as having caused the European tour that was set to begin in August to be cancelled and later rescheduled. Following an argument with Malcolm Young, Phil was fired from the band, and did not return until 1994.

During the North American tour, Midnight Flyer was the supporting act for the band. Y&T was the opening act for the band during the shows in the United Kingdom.

== Reception ==
Peter Robb from the Windsor Star who attended the second night at Cobo Hall in Detroit, gave the show a mixed review, opening that the band had succeeded to the top of heavy rock, but failed to innovate beyond the notability of bands like Slade and Bloodrock. Robb did however, state that AC/DC worked hard for their fans and gave each song they performed that night a marathon of effort for the audience whose cheers rose loud above the speakers when an older hit was performed.

Douglas E. Hall from Billboard, stated in his review that the band put on a hell of a show for a packed enthusiastic audience at Madison Square Garden, which had chanted along with the band's songs frequently, giving a big reaction when the band began performing the song "Dirty Deeds Done Dirt Cheap" whilst the band gave a set of high energy and straight ahead rock 'n' roll, and delivering an impressive finale with simulated cannon blasts.

Lakeland Ledger's Rick Wilbur opened his review, stating that the sold out house of delighted and complacent heavy metal fans were "electrified" by the band, led by an energetic stage presence delivered by guitarist Angus Young, whom Wilbur had claimed stole the show with his showmanship and adroit musicianship. Malcolm Young, Williams and Rudd were also praised, sounding tight and appropriately high volume while Johnson's high energy screeches pleased the most demanding of fans. Wilbur later concluded his review, stating that while it wasn't harmonic and pleasant music, it was undeniably an effective heavy metal show that sounded good enough to support the thesis that AC/DC is a leader in the heavy metal interest.

== Tour dates ==
List of 1981 concerts, showing date, city, country and venue
| Date | City | Country | Venue |
|---|---|---|---|
| 14 November 1981 | Detroit | United States | Cobo Hall |
| 16 November 1981 | Detroit | United States | Cobo Hall |
| 17 November 1981 | Milwaukee | United States | MECCA Arena |
| 19 November 1981 | Rosemont | United States | Rosemont Horizon |
| 20 November 1981 | Rosemont | United States | Rosemont Horizon |
| 21 November 1981 | Rosemont | United States | Rosemont Horizon |
| 22 November 1981 | Bloomington | United States | Met Center |
| 23 November 1981 | Bloomington | United States | Met Center |
| 25 November 1981 | Cincinnati | United States | Riverfront Coliseum |
| 26 November 1981 | St. Louis | United States | Checkerdome |
| 28 November 1981 | Indianapolis | United States | Market Square Arena |
| 29 November 1981 | Richfield | United States | Richfield Coliseum |
| 30 November 1981 | Lexington | United States | Rupp Arena |
| 2 December 1981 | New York City | United States | Madison Square Garden |
| 3 December 1981 | Hartford | United States | Hartford Civic Center |
| 4 December 1981 | Providence | United States | Providence Civic Center |
| 6 December 1981 | East Rutherford | United States | Brendan Byrne Arena |
| 7 December 1981 | Philadelphia | United States | The Spectrum |
| 8 December 1981 | Philadelphia | United States | The Spectrum |
| 10 December 1981 | Toronto | Canada | Maple Leaf Gardens |
| 11 December 1981 | Toronto | Canada | Maple Leaf Gardens |
| 12 December 1981 | Montreal | Canada | Montreal Forum |
| 14 December 1981 | Boston | United States | Boston Garden |
| 15 December 1981 | Boston | United States | Boston Garden |
| 16 December 1981 | Rochester | United States | Rochester Community War Memorial |
| 17 December 1981 | Rochester | United States | Rochester Community War Memorial |
| 20 December 1981 | Landover | United States | Capital Centre |
| 21 December 1981 | Landover | United States | Capital Centre |

List of 1982 concerts, showing date, city, country and venue
| Date | City | Country | Venue |
|---|---|---|---|
| 17 January 1982 | Birmingham | United States | Birmingham–Jefferson Civic Center |
| 18 January 1982 | Nashville | United States | Nashville Municipal Auditorium |
| 19 January 1982 | Memphis | United States | Mid-South Coliseum |
| 20 January 1982 | Atlanta | United States | The Omni |
| 21 January 1982 | Atlanta | United States | The Omni |
| 23 January 1982 | Baton Rouge | United States | Riverside Centroplex |
| 24 January 1982 | Mobile | United States | Mobile Municipal Auditorium |
| 27 January 1982 | Pembroke Pines | United States | Hollywood Sportatorium |
| 28 January 1982 | Lakeland | United States | Lakeland Civic Center |
| 29 January 1982 | Lakeland | United States | Lakeland Civic Center |
| 1 February 1982 | Dallas | United States | Reunion Arena |
| 2 February 1982 | Dallas | United States | Reunion Arena |
| 3 February 1982 | Houston | United States | The Summit |
| 4 February 1982 | Houston | United States | The Summit |
| 7 February 1982 | Salt Lake City | United States | Salt Palace |
| 9 February 1982 | Seattle | United States | Seattle Coliseum |
| 10 February 1982 | Seattle | United States | Seattle Coliseum |
| 11 February 1982 | Seattle | United States | Seattle Coliseum |
| 12 February 1982 | Seattle | United States | Seattle Coliseum |
| 14 February 1982 | Daly City | United States | Cow Palace |
| 15 February 1982 | Daly City | United States | Cow Palace |
| 16 February 1982 | Daly City | United States | Cow Palace |
| 18 February 1982 | Denver | United States | McNichols Sports Arena |
| 19 February 1982 | Denver | United States | McNichols Sports Arena |
| 21 February 1982 | Inglewood | United States | The Forum |
| 22 February 1982 | Inglewood | United States | The Forum |
| 23 February 1982 | Los Angeles | United States | Los Angeles Memorial Sports Arena |
| 25 February 1982 | Phoenix | United States | Compton Terrace at Legend City |
| 4 June 1982 | Osaka | Japan | Festival Hall |
| 6 June 1982 | Osaka | Japan | Expo Hall |
| 8 June 1982 | Kyoto | Japan | Kaikan Hall |
| 9 June 1982 | Nagoya | Japan | Shi Kokaido Hall |
| 10 June 1982 | Tokyo | Japan | Nippon Budokan |
| 29 September 1982 | Birmingham | England | National Exhibition Centre |
| 30 September 1982 | Birmingham | England | National Exhibition Centre |
| 1 October 1982 | Leeds | England | Queens Hall |
| 3 October 1982 | Manchester | England | Manchester Apollo |
| 4 October 1982 | Newcastle | England | Newcastle City Hall |
| 5 October 1982 | Newcastle | England | Newcastle City Hall |
| 6 October 1982 | Newcastle | England | Newcastle City Hall |
| 8 October 1982 | Glasgow | Scotland | Apollo Theatre |
| 9 October 1982 | Glasgow | Scotland | Apollo Theatre |
| 10 October 1982 | Edinburgh | Scotland | Edinburgh Playhouse |
| 11 October 1982 | Edinburgh | Scotland | Edinburgh Playhouse |
| 13 October 1982 | London | England | Hammersmith Odeon |
| 14 October 1982 | London | England | Hammersmith Odeon |
| 15 October 1982 | London | England | Hammersmith Odeon |
| 16 October 1982 | London | England | Hammersmith Odeon |
| 18 October 1982 | London | England | Wembley Arena |
| 19 October 1982 | London | England | Wembley Arena |
| 21 October 1982 | Ballsbridge | Ireland | Royal Dublin Society Arena |
| 22 October 1982 | Ballsbridge | Ireland | Royal Dublin Society Arena |
| 26 November 1982 | Nuremberg | West Germany | Messezentrum |
| 27 November 1982 | Frankfurt | West Germany | Festhalle Frankfurt |
| 28 November 1982 | Munich | West Germany | Olympiahalle |
| 30 November 1982 | Lyon | France | Palais des Sports de Gerland |
| 2 December 1982 | Avignon | France | Parc Exposition De Chateaublanc |
| 4 December 1982 | Paris | France | Rothonde Du Borget |
| 6 December 1982 | Brussels | Belgium | Vorst Nationaal |
| 9 December 1982 | Cologne | West Germany | Sporthalle |
| 10 December 1982 | Dortmund | West Germany | Westfalenhalle |
| 12 December 1982 | Zürich | Switzerland | Hallenstadion |

=== Box office score data ===
List of box office score data with date, city, venue, attendance, gross, references
| Date | City | Venue | Attendance | Gross | Ref(s) |
|---|---|---|---|---|---|
| 26 November 1981 | St. Louis, United States | Checkerdome | 16,199 | $165,884 | |
| 3 December 1981 | Hartford, United States | Civic Center | 15,190 | $168,043 | |
| 4 December 1981 | Providence, United States | Civic Center | 13,200 | $132,145 | |
| 6 December 1981 | East Rutherford, United States | Brendan Byrne Arena | 20,161 | $237,037 | |
| 7–8 December 1981 | Philadelphia, United States | Spectrum | 30,955 | $285,108 | |
| 10–11 December 1981 | Toronto, Canada | Maple Leaf Gardens | 30,768 / 33,350 | $376,582 | |
| 18 January 1982 | Nashville, United States | Municipal Auditorium | 9,900 | $98,540 | |
| 27 January 1982 | Pembroke Pines, United States | Hollywood Sportarium | 12,804 | $144,045 | |
| 28–29 January 1982 | Lakeland, United States | Civic Center | 19,835 | $233,350 | |
| 1 February 1982 | Dallas, United States | Reunion Arena | 19,012 | $227,628 | |

== Personnel ==
- Angus Young – lead guitar
- Cliff Williams – bass guitar, backing vocals
- Malcolm Young – rhythm guitar, backing vocals
- Phil Rudd – drums
- Brian Johnson – lead vocals
