= AC/DC =

Australian rock band

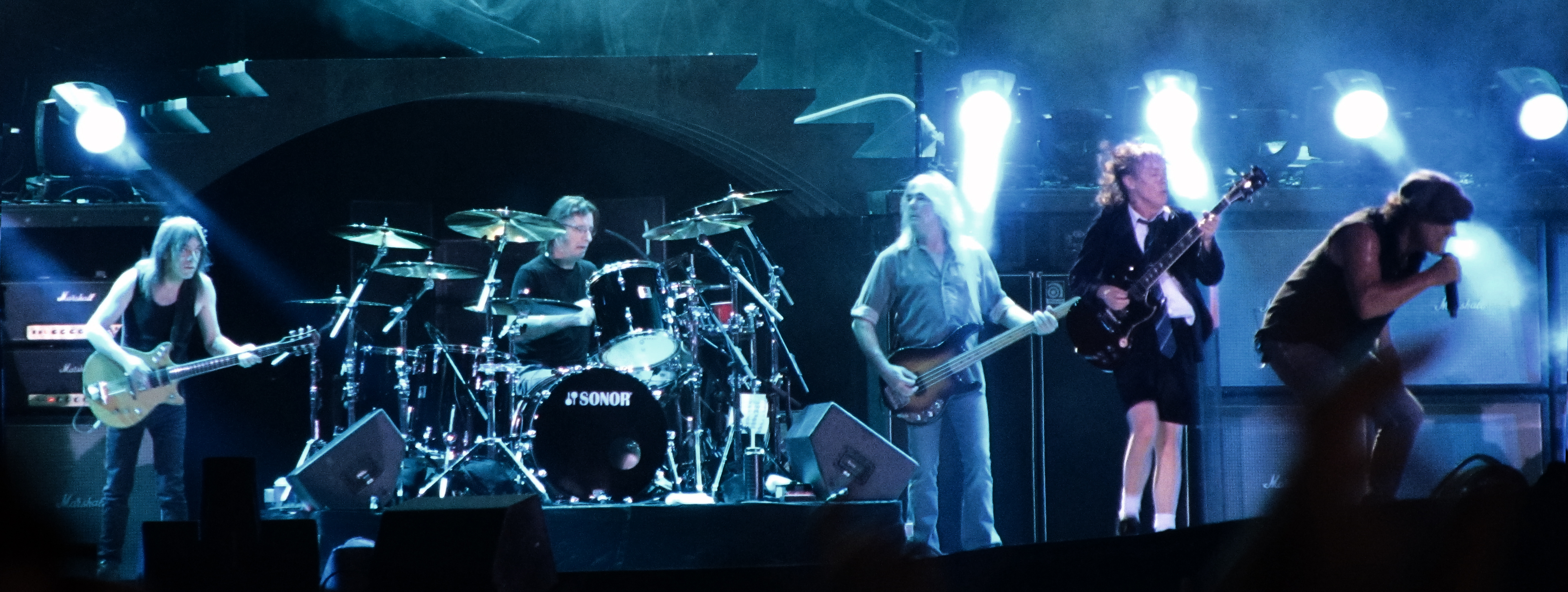
- AC/DC in Buenos Aires in 2009. From left to right: Malcolm Young, Phil Rudd, Cliff Williams, Angus Young and Brian Johnson

Background information
- Also known as: Acca Dacca
- Origin: Sydney, New South Wales, Australia
- Genres: Hard rock; blues rock; rock and roll; heavy metal
- Works: Discography; songs
- Years active: 1973–present (hiatus: 2016–2018)
- Labels: Albert; Atlantic; ATCO; East West; Elektra; Epic; Columbia
- Spinoff of: Marcus Hook Roll Band
- Awards: Full list
- Members: Angus Young; Phil Rudd; Cliff Williams; Brian Johnson; Stevie Young
- Past members: See list of AC/DC members
- Website: acdc.com

AC/DC are an Australian rock band formed in Sydney in 1973. Their music has been variously described as hard rock, blues rock and heavy metal, although the band calls it simply "rock and roll". They are cited as a formative influence on the new wave of British heavy metal bands, such as Def Leppard and Saxon, and were among "the second generation of rising stars ready to step into the breach as the old guard waned", according to critics.

AC/DC were founded by brothers Angus (lead guitar) and Malcolm Young (rhythm guitar), with Colin Burgess (drums), Larry Van Kriedt (bass guitar) and Dave Evans (lead vocals). They underwent several line-up changes before releasing their Australasian-only debut album, High Voltage (1975). Membership stabilised after the release of Let There Be Rock (1977), with the Young brothers, Phil Rudd on drums, Cliff Williams on bass guitar and Bon Scott on lead vocals. Seven months after the release of Highway to Hell (1979), Scott died of alcohol poisoning and English singer Brian Johnson was then recruited as their new frontman. With Johnson in the line-up, the band recorded one of the best-selling albums of all time, Back in Black (1980). Rudd was fired midway through the Flick of the Switch recording sessions in 1983. He was replaced by Simon Wright, who was also replaced by Chris Slade six years later.

AC/DC experienced a commercial resurgence in the early 1990s with the release of The Razors Edge (1990); it was their only record featuring Slade, as Rudd returned in 1994. Rudd has since recorded five more albums with the band, starting with Ballbreaker (1995). In 2014, Angus and Malcolm's nephew, Stevie Young, replaced Malcolm due to early-onset dementia, from which he died three years later, and debuted on the album Rock or Bust. On the accompanying tour, Slade filled in for Rudd due to his arrest for threatening to kill and possession of methamphetamine and cannabis. In March 2016, Guns N' Roses singer Axl Rose replaced Johnson due to a risk of hearing loss. Williams retired at the end of the tour, and the band entered a two-year hiatus. A reunion of the Rock or Bust line-up was announced in September 2020 for Power Up, which was released two months later. Drummer Matt Laug and bass guitarist Chris Chaney replaced Rudd and Williams on its supporting tour in 2024, though both remain official members.

AC/DC have been estimated to have sold over 200 million records worldwide, making them one of the best-selling artists of all time. In the US, they have also sold 84 million records according to the Recording Industry Association of America (RIAA), and had five singles reach the top 50 on the Billboard Hot 100 and ten albums in the top 10 on the Billboard 200. In 2016, according to Forbes' Celebrity 100, the band have earned $67.5 million. The band's accolades include two Grammy Awards, two Guinness World Records, one iHeartRadio Music Award, three ARIA Music Awards, eight APRA Awards – including the Ted Albert Award for Outstanding Services to Australian Music, and inductions into the ARIA Hall of Fame in 1988, and the Rock and Roll Hall of Fame in 2003.

== History ==
=== 1973–1974: Formation and name ===
AC/DC were formed in the Australian pop music scene of the early to mid-1970s, which is described as the third wave of rock music in Australia. Many local 1960s artists – e.g., the Easybeats and the Masters Apprentices, had attempted to gain international recognition but achieved limited commercial success overseas and disbanded after returning to Australia. Newer artists and veterans of the 1960s beat boom developed a variety of genres, which included a harder blues rock style dubbed pub rock. Popular Australian bands – e.g., Sherbet and Skyhooks, played mainstream pop or adopted a glam rock approach.

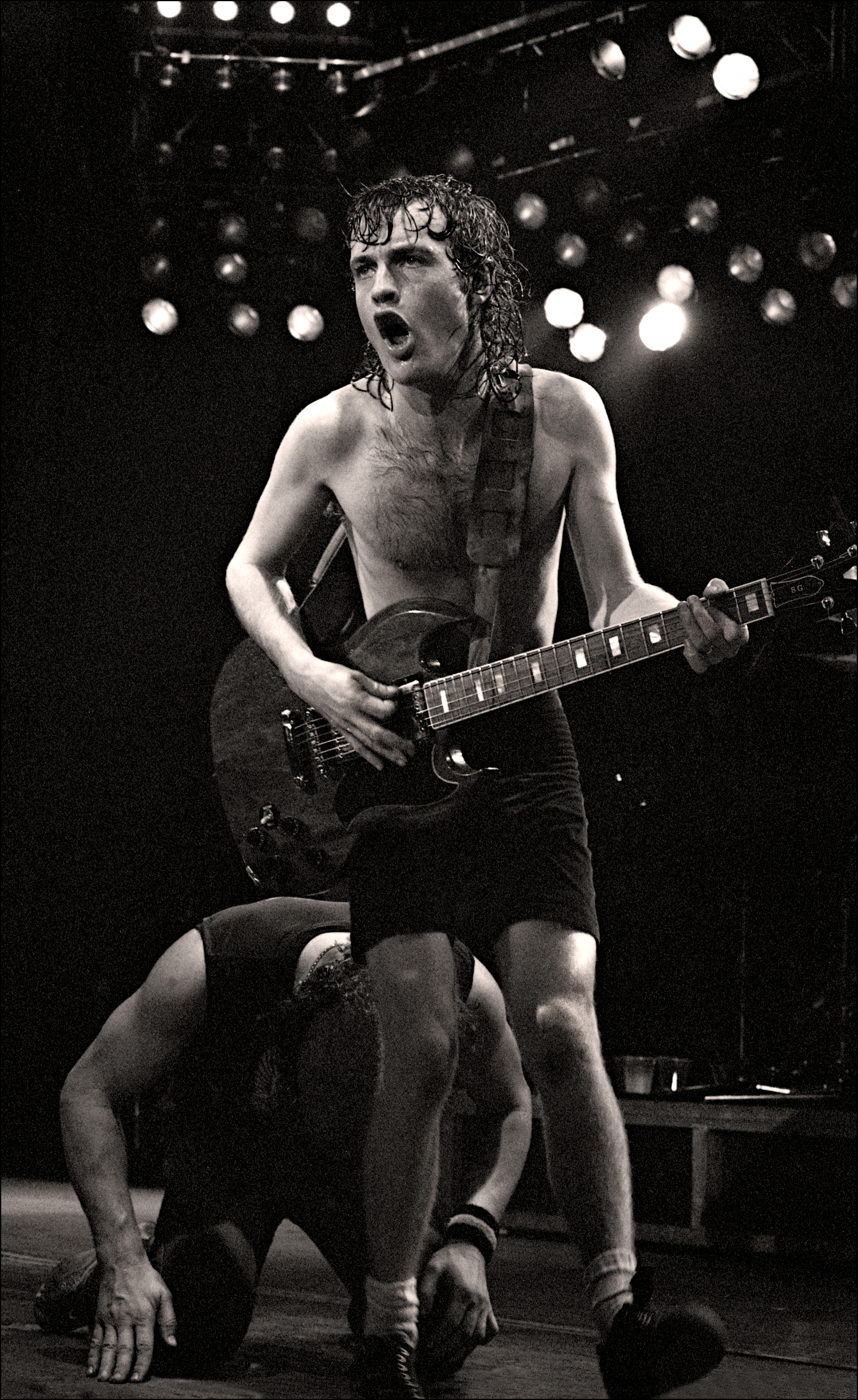
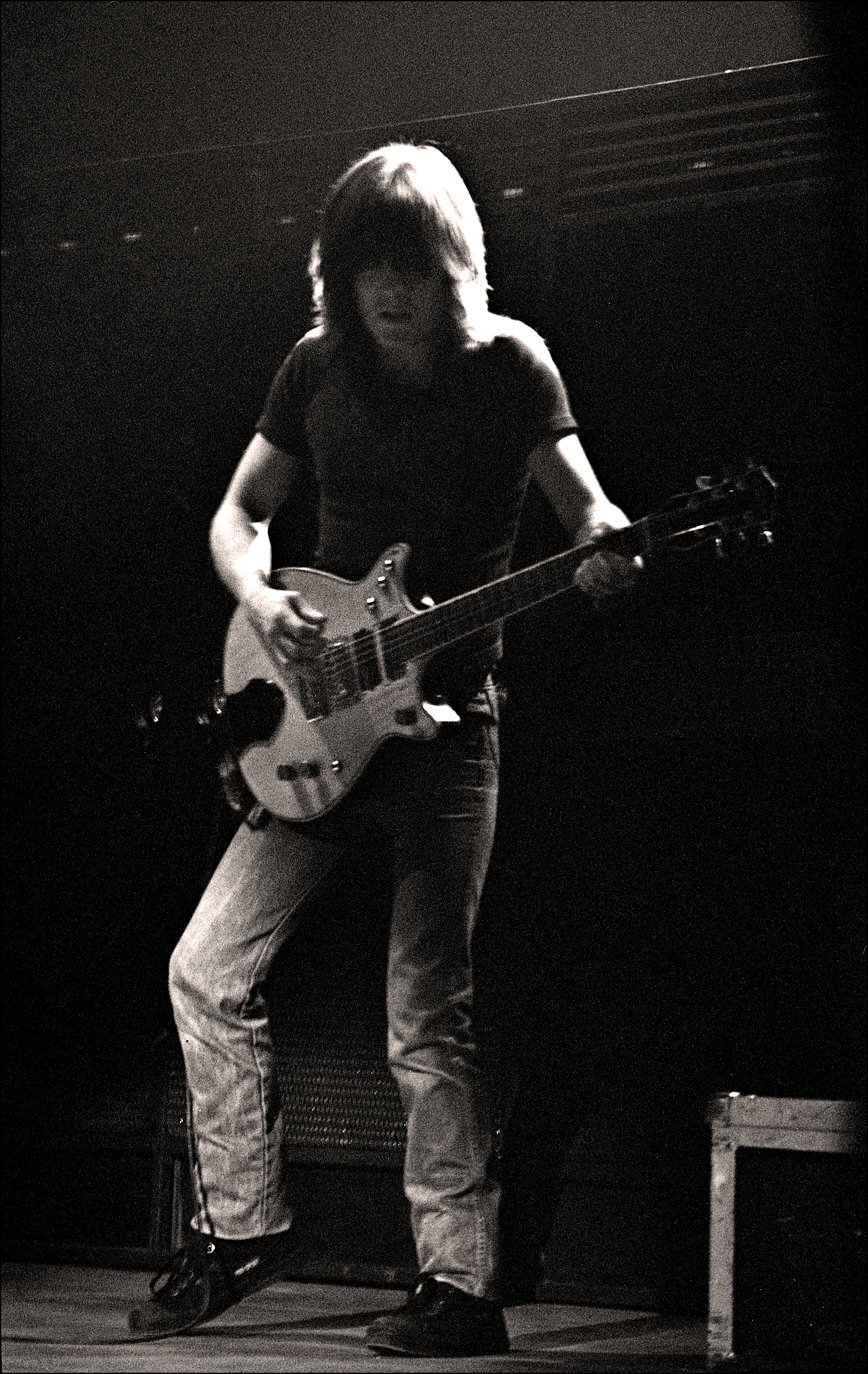
AC/DC's founding members Angus Young (left) and Malcolm Young (right); both performing in Manchester in 1982

In November 1973, brothers Malcolm and Angus Young formed AC/DC in Sydney with drummer Colin Burgess from the Masters Apprentices, bass guitarist Larry Van Kriedt and vocalist Dave Evans. Earlier, for two years, Malcolm and Evans had been members of a Newcastle-based band called Velvet Underground (not the American group of the same name), and Angus, who would only jam with his friends, had his own band called Tantrum. In 1973, the Young brothers had joined the studio-only band, Marcus Hook Roll Band and contributed towards the first recordings for its debut album, Tales of Old Grand-Daddy (1974), although the pair left before it was issued. The initial AC/DC formation was made up of Malcolm, Burgess and ex-Velvet Underground bass guitarist, Mick Sheffzick. Later, the rest of the members joined when Van Kriedt replaced Sheffzick, Evans responded to an ad in the Sydney Morning Herald and Angus passed an audition.

The band's logo was designed in 1977 by Gerard Huerta. It first appeared on the international version of Let There Be Rock.

Upon formation, Malcolm and Angus developed the band's name after their sister Margaret pointed out the symbol "AC/DC" on the AC adapter of her sewing machine. A.C./D.C. is an abbreviation for alternating current/direct current electricity. The brothers felt that this name symbolised the band's raw energy and the power-driven performances of their music. It is pronounced one letter at a time, though the band are colloquially known as Acca Dacca in Australia. The AC/DC band name is stylised with a lightning bolt separating the AC from DC and has been used on all studio albums, except the international version of Dirty Deeds Done Dirt Cheap. Their logo was designed by American typographer Gerard Huerta in 1977 and first appeared on Let There Be Rock. It is the most tattooed logo in history. Adam Behr of The Bulletin explained, "[its] type font conveyed the sense of electricity implicit in their name."

AC/DC's first official gig was at Chequers nightclub in Sydney on 31 December 1973. For about 18 months, most members of the band dressed in some form of glam or satin outfit. Angus tried various costumes: Zorro, a gorilla, and Superman. Their performances involved cover versions of the Rolling Stones, Chuck Berry, the Beatles and a "smattering of old blues standards" while trialling some original songs. Angus first wore his characteristic school-uniform stage outfit in April 1974 at Victoria Park, Sydney; the idea was Margaret's. He portrayed a boy "straight from school to play his guitar." On stage, Evans was occasionally replaced on lead vocals by their first manager, Denis Loughlin from Sherbet. In Paul Stenning's book AC/DC: Two Sides to Every Glory, he states that Evans and Loughlin were clashing and as a consequence, other members developed bitter feelings towards Evans.

The group recorded a session in January 1974 at EMI Studios in Sydney, with Vanda & Young – George Young and Harry Vanda – as the producers; both were former members of the Easybeats and Marcus Hook Roll Band. George is Angus and Malcolm's older brother. Several songs were recorded, including "Can I Sit Next to You, Girl", "Rockin' in the Parlour" and an early version of "Rock 'n' Roll Singer". A week after the session, Burgess was fired due to intoxication; he was unconscious during a performance. Subsequently, Van Kriedt was replaced; his recorded bass lines for the January session were re-recorded by George. Their replacements, Neil Smith on bass guitar and Noel Taylor on drums, lasted six weeks, replaced in turn by Rob Bailey and Peter Clack, respectively. The band signed with Albert Productions in June 1974. "Can I Sit Next to You, Girl", backed with "Rockin' in the Parlour", taken from the January session, was released on 22 July 1974 as the band's first single. The song reached the top 50 on Australia's Kent Music Report singles chart.

The group had developed a strong live reputation by mid-1974, which resulted in a supporting slot on Lou Reed's national tour in August. During that tour, Malcolm switched to rhythm guitar, leaving Angus on lead guitar – the roles the two guitarists played from then on. During 1974, on the recommendation of Michael Chugg, veteran Melbourne promoter Michael Browning booked them to play at his club, the Hard Rock Cafe. He was not pleased with their glam rock image and felt that Evans was the wrong singer, but he was impressed by the Young brothers' guitar playing. Browning then received a call weeks after the Hard Rock gig from Malcolm: Loughlin had quit and they were stuck in Adelaide with no money. They hired Browning as their manager in November 1974, with the cooperation of George and Vanda. The Young brothers decided to abandon their glam rock image; instead, they pursued a pub rock sound. To this end, they agreed that Evans was no longer a suitable frontman.

=== 1974–1976: Bon Scott joins ===
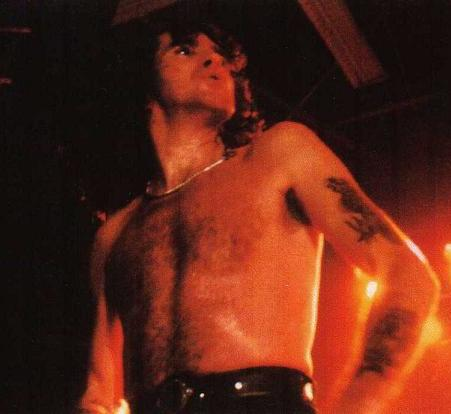
Bon Scott (pictured in 1979) joined as the lead singer in 1974.

In September 1974, Bon Scott, a vocalist previously with the Valentines (1966–1970) and Fraternity (1971–1973), joined AC/DC after his former bandmate Vince Lovegrove introduced him to George during their stopover in Adelaide in August. Scott worked as a chauffeur for the group until an audition promoted him to lead singer. Like the Young brothers, Scott was born in Scotland, emigrated to Australia in his childhood and had a passion for blues music. Scott also had experience as a songwriter and drummer. Their debut single's tracks were re-written and the vocals were re-recorded by Scott. With Scott's inclusion, "[their] working-class style, boogie-rock sound and earthy humour fell into place", according to music journalist Ian McFarlane. Scott's first concert for AC/DC was on 5 October 1974 at the Masonic Hall in Brighton-Le-Sands, New South Wales.

AC/DC recorded their first studio album, High Voltage, in November 1974 with Vanda & Young producing at Albert Studios in Sydney. Bailey and Clack were still in the band during its recording, but Clack played on only one track, and the rest were provided by session drummer Tony Currenti. George handled some bass parts and later redid others. Recording sessions took ten days and were based on instrumentals written by the Young brothers with lyrics added by Scott. They relocated to Melbourne that month. Both Bailey and Clack were fired in January 1975. Paul Matters took over bass duties briefly before being fired in turn and replaced temporarily by George or Malcolm for live duties. Matters had disagreements with the Young brothers' decisions. Meanwhile, on drums, Ron Carpenter and Russell Coleman had brief tenures before Phil Rudd, from Buster Brown, joined in that month. Bass guitarist Mark Evans was enlisted in March 1975, setting the line-up which lasted two years.

"T.N.T."
"T.N.T.", AC/DC's third single from the album of the same name, with lead vocals by Scott

The band were scheduled to play at the 1975 Sunbury Pop music festival in January; however, they went home without performing following a physical altercation with the management and crew of headlining act Deep Purple. High Voltage was released exclusively in Australasia on 17 February 1975 via Albert Productions/EMI Music Australia, and reached the top 20 in Australia. It provided a single, their cover version of Big Joe Williams' "Baby, Please Don't Go".

McFarlane observed, "[their] initial achievement was to take the raw energy of Aussie pub rock, extend its basic guidelines, serve it up to a teenybop Countdown audience and still reap the benefits of the live circuit by packing out the pubs." They released their second studio album T.N.T. (1975), in Australasia only, its tracks were recorded with Evans and Rudd except for two tracks, which used Currenti and George. It peaked at number two in Australia and the top 40 in New Zealand. Its second single, "It's a Long Way to the Top (If You Wanna Rock 'n' Roll)" (December 1975), had a well-known promotional video made for the ABC-TV pop music programme Countdown, featuring the band miming the song on the back of a flatbed truck. The single reached the top ten in Australia. The title track was issued as a single in March 1976 and includes the lyric "so lock up your daughter", which was modified into their first United Kingdom tour's name.

=== 1976–1977: Initial success and record deal ===
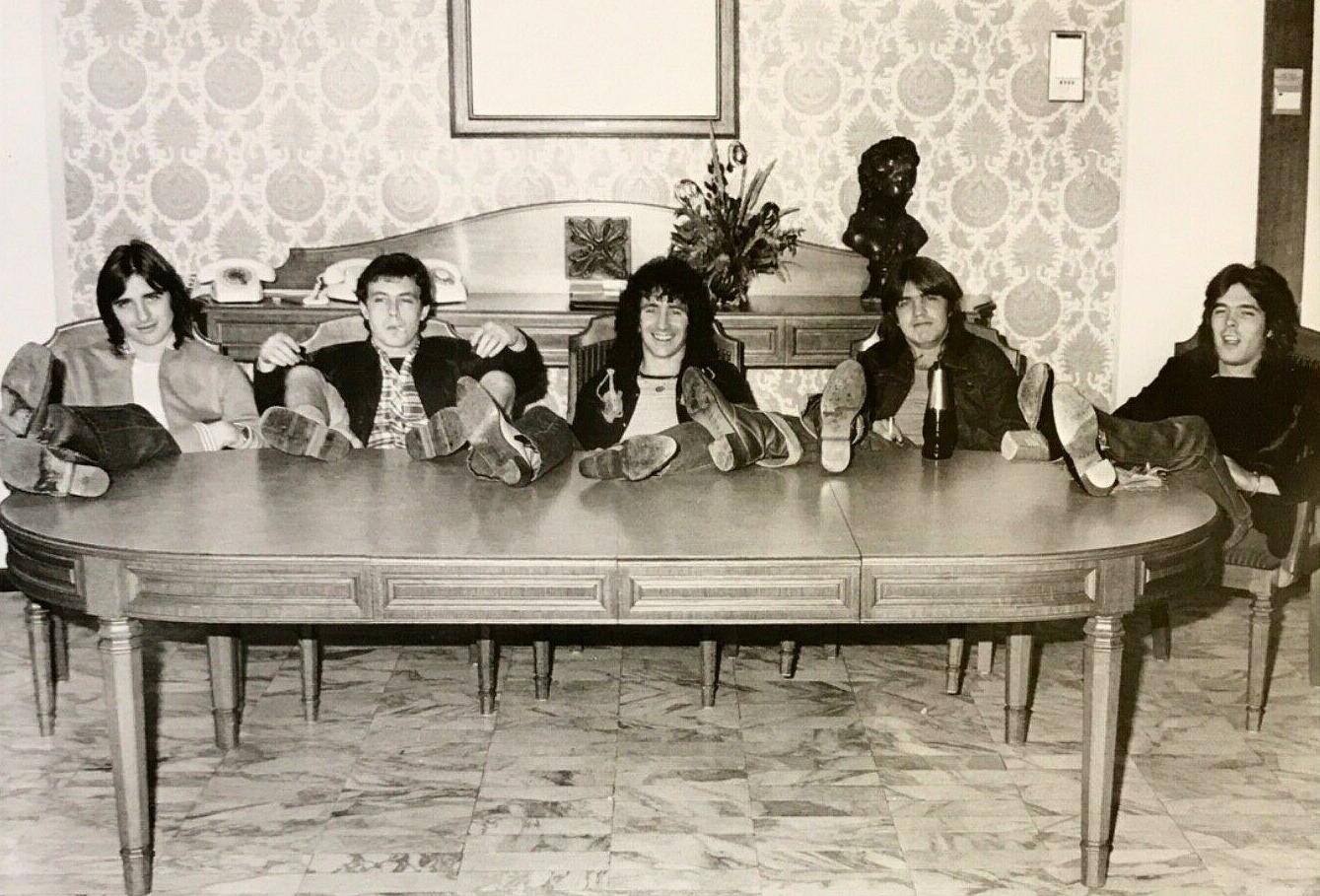
AC/DC in a 1977 press photo for ATCO Records. From left to right: Phil Rudd, Angus, Scott, Malcolm and Cliff Williams

Browning sent promo material to contacts in London, which came to the attention of Phil Carson of Atlantic Records. AC/DC signed an international deal with Atlantic in 1976. On their arrival in London in April, their scheduled tour with Back Street Crawler was cancelled due to the death of that group's guitarist, Paul Kossoff. As a result, AC/DC returned to playing smaller venues to build a local following until their label organised the Lock Up Your Daughters tour sponsored by Sounds magazine, starting in June 1976. At the time, punk rock was breaking and came to dominate the pages of major British music weeklies, including NME and Melody Maker. AC/DC were sometimes identified with the punk rock movement by the British press, but they hated punk rock, believing it to be a passing fad. Browning wrote that "it wasn't possible to even hold a conversation with AC/DC about punk without them getting totally pissed off".

The first AC/DC album to have worldwide distribution was a 1976 combination of tracks taken from the High Voltage and T.N.T. LPs. Also titled High Voltage, it was released through Atlantic in May 1976, eventually going on to sell over three million copies in the US by 2005. The track selection was heavily weighted towards the more recent T.N.T., including only two songs from their first LP. Their third studio album, Dirty Deeds Done Dirt Cheap, was released in September–November 1976, (Note: The album was released on 20 September 1976 in Australasia, and released in Europe on 12 November 1976.) in both Australian and European versions. Track listings varied worldwide; the international version of the album included the T.N.T. track "Rocker", which had previously not been released internationally. The original Australian version included "Jailbreak". This was later more readily available on the 1984 compilation extended play '74 Jailbreak, or as a live version on 1992's Live. Dirty Deeds Done Dirt Cheap was not released in North America until 2 April 1981, by which time the band were at the peak of their popularity.

After a brief tour of Sweden, they returned to London, where they set new attendance records during their residency at the Marquee. They continued to tour throughout Europe and then Australia. In January 1977, they started recording their fourth studio album, Let There Be Rock. (Note: The album was released less than 2 months later on 21 March 1977 in Australasia, and internationally on 23 June 1977.) Early the same year, they returned to Britain and began a European tour with Black Sabbath. While Scott and Ozzy Osbourne quickly became friends, other members of each group were less cordial. In one incident, Geezer Butler allegedly pulled a switchblade at Malcolm during their show in Sweden in April. Accounts of the incident differ, but AC/DC were taken off the rest of the tour.

=== 1977–1980: Cliff Williams joins and death of Bon Scott ===
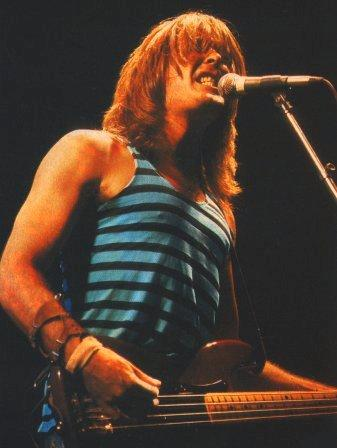
Williams (pictured in 1981) joined as bass guitarist in 1977.

In May 1977, Mark Evans was fired. This was due to "musical differences" and personality clashes with Angus. He was replaced on bass guitar by Cliff Williams, a former member of the UK bands Home (1970–1974) and Bandit (1976). Scott explained that Williams was more experienced, while Malcolm wanted a bass guitarist and backing vocalist. Evans' autobiography, Dirty Deeds: My Life Inside/Outside of AC/DC, released in 2011, predominantly dealt with his time in AC/DC.

AC/DC's first American radio exposure was through Bill Bartlett at Jacksonville station WPDQ-FM/WAIV-FM in 1975. Two years later, they played their first concert there, as a support act for Canadian group Moxy in Austin, Texas, on 27 July 1977. From booking agent Doug Thaler of American Talent International and the management of Leber-Krebs, they experienced the country's stadium circuit, supporting rock acts Ted Nugent, Aerosmith, Kiss, Styx, UFO and Blue Öyster Cult; they co-headlined with Cheap Trick. AC/DC released their fifth studio album, Powerage, on 5 May 1978. The sole single from Powerage was "Rock 'n' Roll Damnation" (June 1978). An appearance at The Apollo, Glasgow, during the Powerage Tour was recorded and released as If You Want Blood You've Got It (1978).

In 1979, the group recorded their sixth studio album, Highway to Hell, with producer Robert John "Mutt" Lange, which was issued on 27 July 1979. It became their first album to reach the top 20 of the Billboard 200, eventually peaking at number 17, and it propelled AC/DC into the top ranks of hard rock acts. Highway to Hell had lyrics that shifted away from flippant and comical towards more central rock themes, putting increased emphasis on backing vocals but still featuring AC/DC's signature sound: loud, simple, pounding riffs and grooving back-beats.

In February 1980, the members began to work on their seventh studio album, Back in Black, with Scott on drums instead of vocals. On 18 February, Scott passed out in a car driven by his friend Alistair Kinnear after a night of drinking at The Music Machine in Camden Town, London. According to police, Kinnear left Scott in the car overnight to sleep off the alcohol effects. Unable to wake Scott early on the evening of 19 February, Kinnear rushed him to King's College Hospital, Camberwell, where Scott was pronounced dead on arrival. The official cause of death was "acute alcohol poisoning". Scott's family buried him in Fremantle, Western Australia, the area they emigrated to when he was a boy.

=== 1980–1983: Brian Johnson joins and rebirth ===
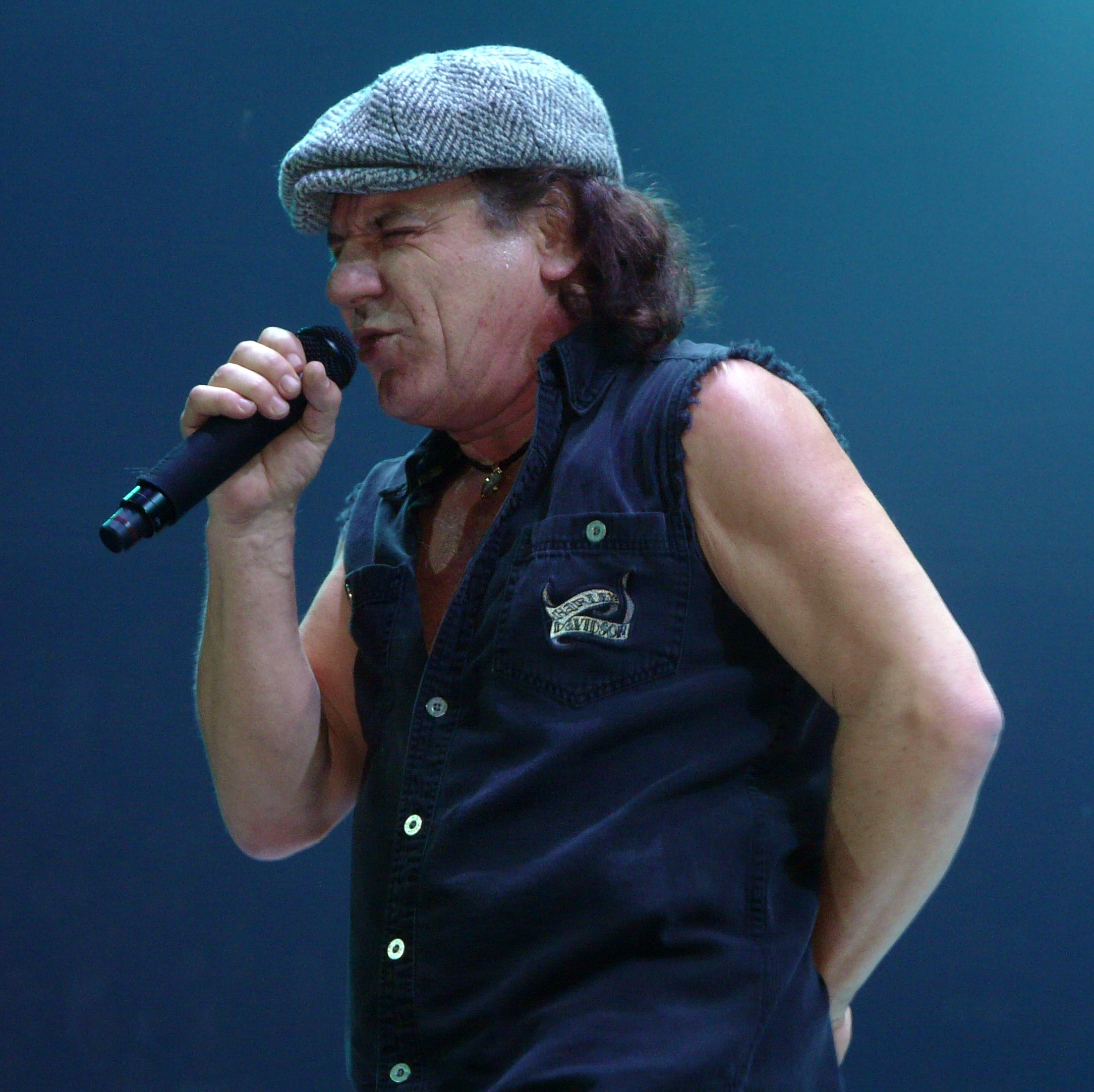
Brian Johnson (pictured in 2008) joined as a lead singer in 1980.

Following Scott's death, the members briefly considered quitting. Scott's parents advised the members that he would have wanted them to carry on, so they decided to continue and sought a new vocalist. Fat Lip vocalist Allan Fryer, ex-Rick Wakeman vocalist Gary Pickford-Hopkins, and the Easybeats' singer Stevie Wright were touted by the press as possible replacements. Various other candidates were considered by the group: ex-Moxy member Buzz Shearman, who was unable to join due to voice issues, Slade vocalist Noddy Holder, and ex-Back Street Crawler vocalist Terry Slesser. During their auditions, the group brought in ex-Geordie singer Brian Johnson, who impressed the group. Johnson sang Ike & Tina Turner's "Nutbush City Limits" and then "Whole Lotta Rosie" from Let There Be Rock. After they worked through the rest of the applicants in the following days, Johnson returned for a second audition. Angus later recalled that Scott himself had praised Johnson's singing.

On 29 March 1980, Malcolm offered Johnson a place in the band, much to the singer's surprise. Out of respect for Scott, the band wanted a vocalist who would not be an imitator. In addition to his distinctive voice, demeanour and love of classic soul and blues music, the group were impressed by Johnson's engaging personality. Johnson was officially announced as the lead singer of AC/DC on 1 April. With Johnson, the group completed the songwriting previously begun with Scott for Back in Black. Recording took place at Compass Point Studios in The Bahamas a few months after Scott's death. Produced by Lange and recorded by Tony Platt, it became the second best-selling album of all time and a hard rock landmark. Its singles are "Hells Bells", "You Shook Me All Night Long", "Rock and Roll Ain't Noise Pollution" and the title track. The album peaked at number one in the UK, and number four in the US, where it spent 612 weeks on the Billboard 200 chart. It also reached the top spot in Australia, Canada, and France.

AC/DC released their first theatrical concert film, AC/DC: Let There Be Rock, which was recorded on 9 December 1979 in Paris during their Highway to Hell Tour on 1 September 1980. It was produced and directed by Eric Dionysius and Eric Mistler and distributed by Warner Bros. The band's eighth studio album, For Those About to Rock We Salute You, was released on 23 November 1981. It was their first number-one album on the Billboard 200, and it also reached the top three in Australia and Germany. It received mixed reviews from critics. Two singles were issued: "Let's Get It Up" and the title track, which peaked at number 13 and number 15 in the UK, respectively.

=== 1983–1990: Line-up changes and commercial decline ===
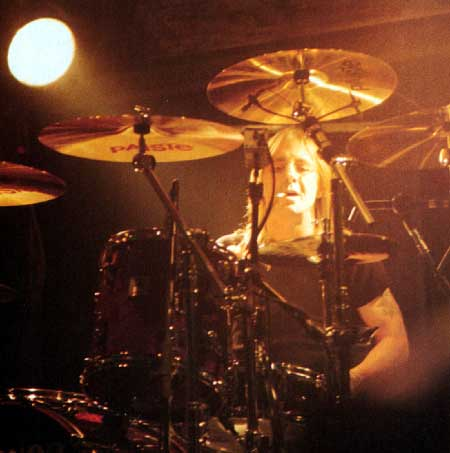
Phil Rudd performing in Seattle in 1996

Instead of Lange, their ninth studio album, Flick of the Switch (1983), was produced by the group's members themselves. It was a return to the rawness and simplicity of their early albums, but received mixed reviews and was considered underdeveloped and unmemorable; one critic stated that they "had made the same album nine times". Flick of the Switch eventually reached number four on the UK charts, and the top five in Australia, and Finland. AC/DC had minor success with the single "Guns for Hire", reaching number 84 on the Billboard Hot 100. Rudd has had long-term drug and alcohol addictions. His friendship with Malcolm had deteriorated and eventually escalated into a physical confrontation, after which Rudd was fired partway through the Flick of the Switch sessions in mid-1983. Rudd was replaced by ex-A II Z drummer Simon Wright in July 1983, after they held over 700 auditions in the US and UK. Simon Kirke and Paul Thompson were two drummers who auditioned.

The band's tenth studio album, Fly on the Wall, produced by the Young brothers in 1985, was also regarded as uninspired and directionless. A concept music video of the same name featured the band at a bar, playing five of the album's ten songs. In 1986, the group returned to the top 20 on singles charts with the made-for-radio "Who Made Who", reaching number nine in Australia and number 16 in the UK. The associated album Who Made Who is the soundtrack to Stephen King's film Maximum Overdrive; it brought together older hits, such as "You Shook Me All Night Long", with a few new songs – the title track and two instrumentals, "D.T." and "Chase the Ace".

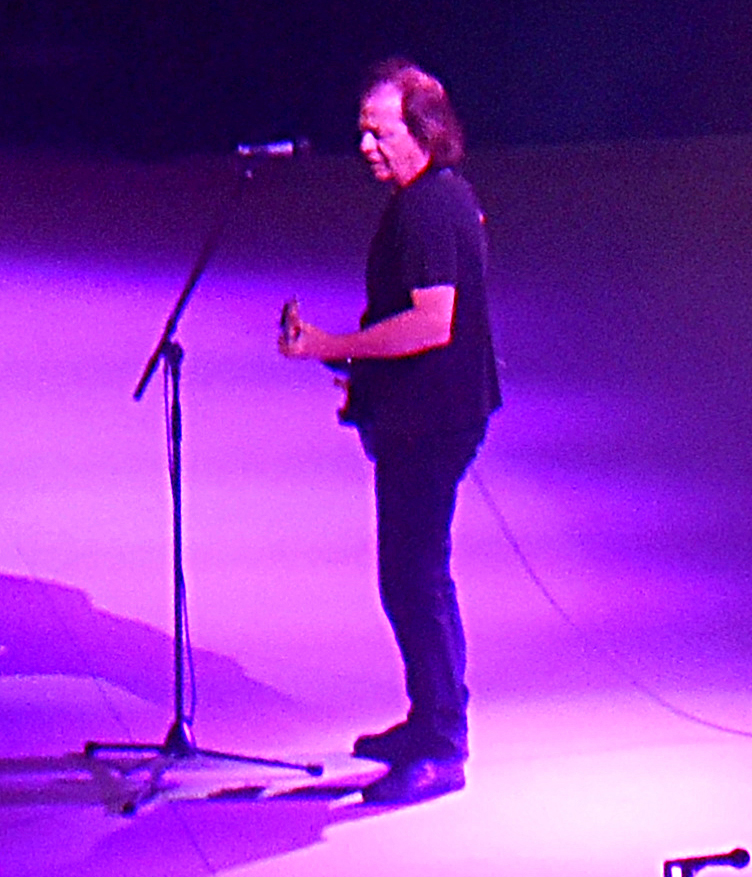
Stevie Young (pictured in 2016) joined as a touring rhythm guitarist in 1988, then joined as a permanent member in 2014.

In February 1988, both AC/DC and Vanda & Young were inducted into the Australian Recording Industry Association's inaugural Hall of Fame. The group's eleventh studio album, Blow Up Your Video, released in 1988, was recorded at Studio Miraval in Le Val, France, with Vanda & Young as producers. The group recorded nineteen songs, choosing ten for the final release; though the album was later criticised for containing excessive "filler", it was a commercial success: Blow Up Your Video reached number two on the UK charts and Australia, AC/DC's highest position since Back in Black in 1980. It provided an Australian top-five and UK top-twenty single, "Heatseeker", and "That's the Way I Wanna Rock 'n' Roll".

The Blow Up Your Video World Tour began in February 1988 in Perth, Australia. In April, following live appearances across Europe, Malcolm announced that he was taking time off from the North American legs of the tour, principally to deal with his alcoholism. Angus and Malcolm's nephew, Stevie Young, temporarily replaced Malcolm on guitar. In 1989, Wright left the group to work on British heavy metal band Dio's fifth studio album, Lock Up the Wolves (1990); he was replaced by drummer Chris Slade, who has played with ex-Thin Lizzy guitarist Gary Moore, before joining. Johnson was unavailable for several months while finalising his divorce, so the Young brothers wrote all the songs for the next album, a practice they continued for all subsequent releases through Power Up in 2020.

=== 1990–1999: Popularity regained ===
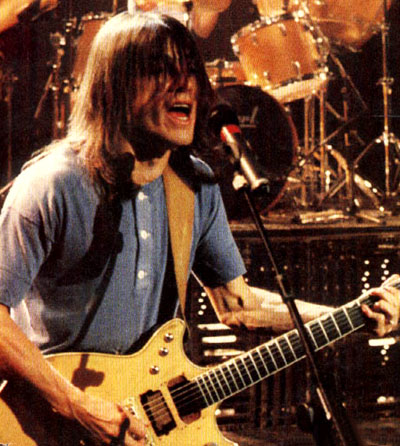
Malcolm performing for the "Thunderstruck" music video in 1990

The band's twelfth studio album, The Razors Edge, was recorded in Vancouver, Canada and was mixed and engineered by Mike Fraser and produced by Bruce Fairbairn, who had previously worked with Aerosmith and Bon Jovi. Released on 24 September 1990, it was a major success for the band, reaching the top three in Australia, Canada, Finland, Germany, Switzerland, and the US. Its lead single, "Thunderstruck" (September 1990), peaked at number 5 on Billboard's Mainstream Rock chart, number 4 on the ARIA Singles chart, and number 13 on the OCC's UK Singles Chart. Its second single, "Moneytalks" (12 November 1990), peaked at number 23 on the Billboard Hot 100. By 2006, the album had achieved 5× Platinum status in the US.

Several shows on the 1991 Razors Edge World Tour were recorded for the 1992 live album, AC/DC Live. It was produced by Fairbairn and was called one of the best live albums of the 1990s by Barry Weber of AllMusic. AC/DC headlined the Monsters of Rock show during this tour, which was released as a video album, Live at Donington, in 1992. During the tour, three fans were killed at a concert at the Salt Palace in Salt Lake City on 18 January 1991, when they were crushed and fell to the floor at the beginning of the show. It took 26 minutes before venue security and group members understood the severity of the situation and halted the concert. AC/DC settled out of court with the victims' families. In September 1991, AC/DC performed in Moscow for the Monsters of Rock festival in front of 1.6 million people. It was the first open-air rock concert to be held in the former Soviet Union.

AC/DC recorded "Big Gun" in 1993 for the soundtrack of Arnold Schwarzenegger's film Last Action Hero. Released as a single, it reached number one on the US Mainstream Rock chart, the band's first number-one single on that chart. Pacific Gameworks proposed a beat 'em up video game for the Atari Jaguar CD in 1994, AC/DC: Defenders of Metal, which would have featured the group's crew; however, production never started. Angus and Malcolm invited Rudd to several jam sessions during 1994; he was eventually rehired due to Slade resigning. Recording began in October 1994 at Record Plant Studios in New York City. After 10 weeks of recording, they moved to Ocean Way Studios in Los Angeles, in February 1995, and finished recording in May. On 22 September, their thirteenth studio album, Ballbreaker, was released, which reached number one in Australia, Sweden, and Switzerland.

On 10 July 1996, during the Ballbreaker World Tour, the band filmed their show at the Plaza de Toros de Las Ventas in Madrid, Spain, for the video album No Bull, released on 19 November 1996. On 27 July, the band performed at Bryant Park, New York, as a cameo for the film Private Parts, which released six months later on 7 March 1997. In November 1997, a box set, Bonfire, was released. It contained four albums: a remastered version of Back in Black, Volts – a disc with alternative takes, outtakes and stray live cuts recorded with Scott – and two live albums, Live from the Atlantic Studios and Let There Be Rock: The Movie. Live from the Atlantic Studios was recorded on 7 December 1977 at the Atlantic Studios in New York. Let There Be Rock: The Movie was a double album recorded in December 1979 at the Pavillon de Paris and was the soundtrack of AC/DC: Let There Be Rock (1980).

=== 1999–2014: Popularity confirmed and Black Ice ===
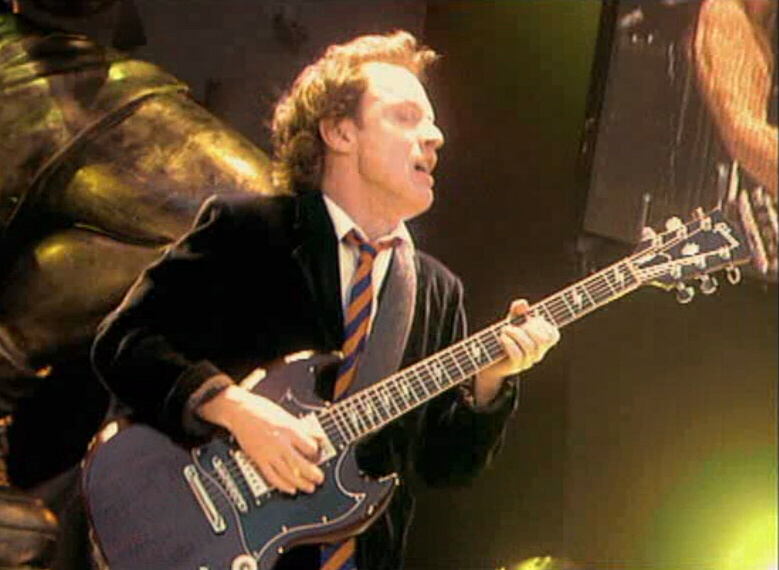
Angus performing in Munich in 2001.

AC/DC recorded their fourteenth studio album, Stiff Upper Lip, in 1999, which was produced by George at The Warehouse Studio in Vancouver. Released in February 2000, it was better received by critics than Ballbreaker but was considered lacking in new ideas. The title track was issued as a single in January 2000, which remained at number one on the US Mainstream Rock charts for four weeks. The other singles, "Satellite Blues" and "Safe in New York City", reached number one and number seven, respectively, on the same chart. Its supporting tour began on 1 August 2000 and ended on 8 July 2001. The show at the Olympiastadion in Munich, Germany, on 14 June was filmed for Stiff Upper Lip Live, released on 4 December 2001.

The band signed a long-term, multi-album deal with Sony Music in December 2002, which issued their remasters series. In 2003, the entire back catalogue – except Ballbreaker and Stiff Upper Lip – was remastered and reissued. Ballbreaker and Stiff Upper Lip were reissued in the UK in 2004. Later in 2003, AC/DC were inducted into the Rock and Roll Hall of Fame. The band's 2003 lineup (Johnson, Williams, Rudd, Angus Young, and Malcolm Young), in addition to Scott, were the inductees. Notably, former bass guitarist Mark Evans (who appeared on four albums in the 1970s) was initially announced as an inductee, but six weeks after the announcement, his inclusion was quietly omitted.

The group performed at Molson Canadian Rocks for Toronto, supporting the Rolling Stones, with Rush and other artists, on 30 July 2003. The benefit concert assisted the city's tourism industry, which was negatively impacted by the 2003 severe acute respiratory syndrome (SARS) outbreak. The audience of 450,000 set a record for the largest paid music event in Canadian history. The band came second in a list of Australia's highest-earning entertainers for 2005, and sixth in the following year. Verizon made all the albums, including the Live at Donington video, available for digital download in 2007. AC/DC released video compilations Family Jewels on 28 March 2005, and Plug Me In on 16 October 2007. No Bull: The Directors Cut, a newly edited, comprehensive Blu-ray and DVD of the band's July 1996 Plaza De Toros de las Ventas concert in Madrid, Spain, was released on 9 September 2008.

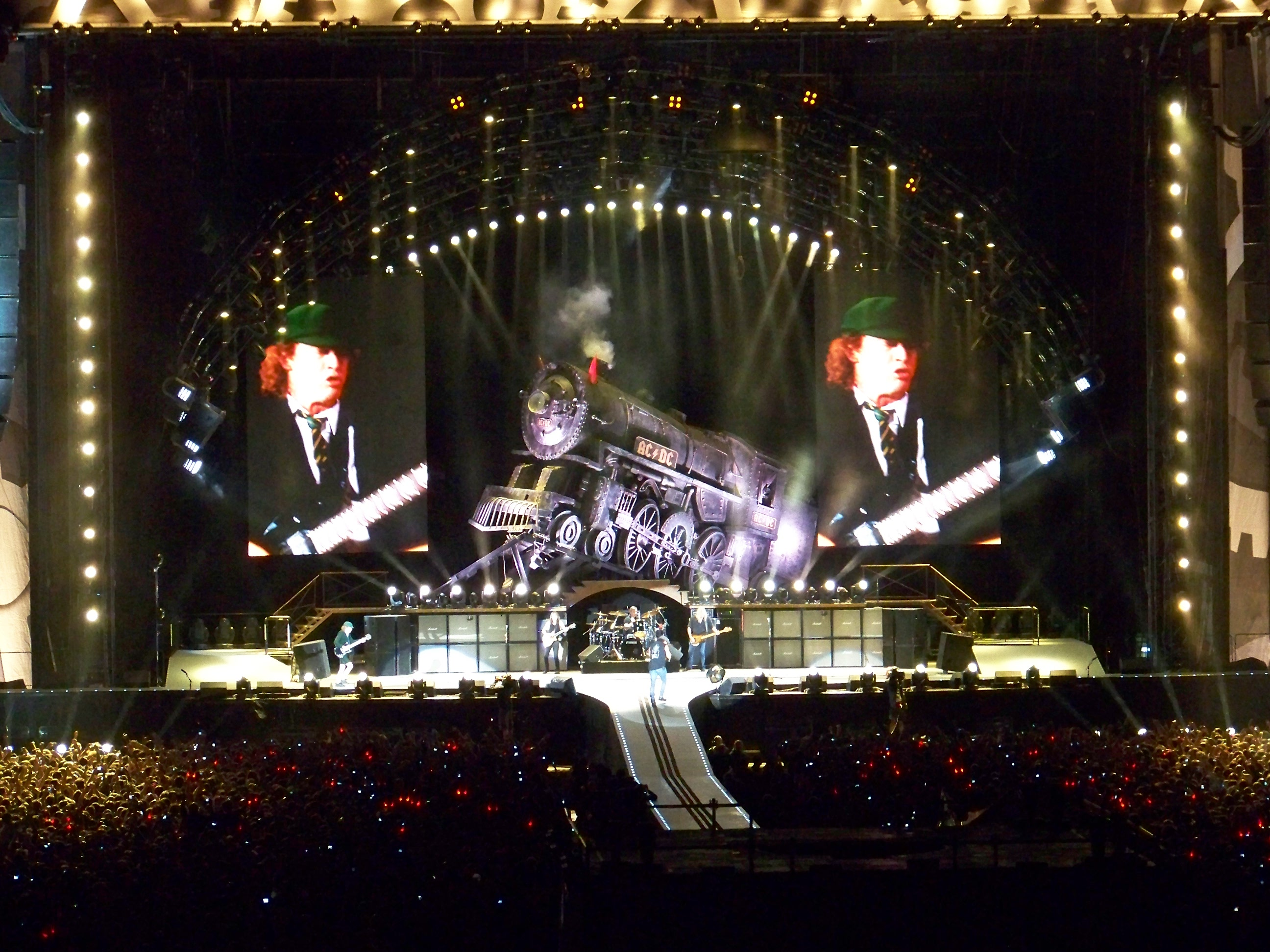
AC/DC's Black Ice World Tour, performed in Madrid in 2009

Black Ice, their fifteenth studio album, was released in Australia on 18 October 2008, and issued worldwide two days later. Produced by Brendan O'Brien and mixed and engineered by Mike Fraser, its 15 tracks were their first studio recordings in eight years. Like Stiff Upper Lip, it was recorded at The Warehouse Studio in Vancouver. It was sold in the US exclusively at Wal-Mart, Sam's Club and the band's official website. Black Ice reached number one in 29 countries, including Australia, the UK, and the US. "Rock 'n' Roll Train", the album's first single, was released to radio on 28 August.

The Black Ice World Tour was announced on 11 September 2008 and began on 28 October in Wilkes-Barre, Pennsylvania. It then concluded with its final show in Bilbao, Spain, on 28 June 2010, after 20 months in which the band went to 108 cities in over 28 countries, with an estimated total audience of over 4.9 million. On 15 September 2008, AC/DC Radio debuted on Sirius Channel 19 and XM Channel 53, which plays their music along with band member interviews. On 29 September 2009, the band announced a collection of studio and live rarities, Backtracks, which was released on 10 November as a 2×CD and DVD standard edition, or 3×CD, 2×DVD and LP deluxe edition box set. On 19 April 2010, AC/DC released Iron Man 2, the soundtrack for the eponymous film, which compiled earlier tracks from the band's studio albums.

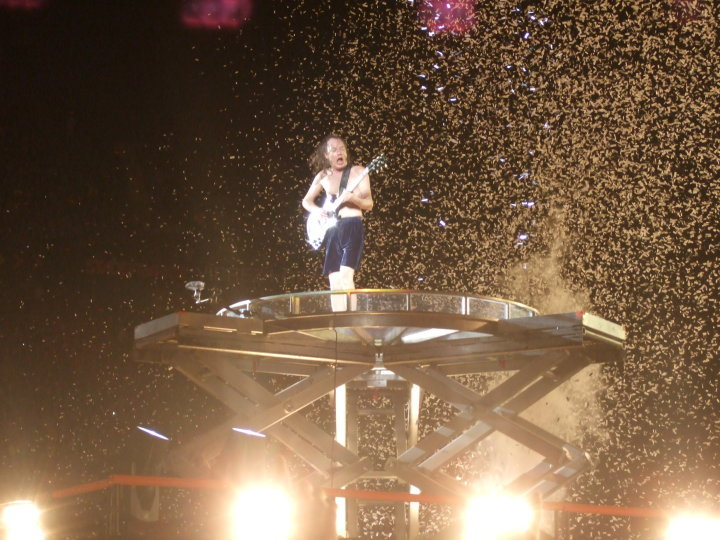
Angus performing in Paris in 2010

The band headlined the Download Festival at Donington Park in June 2010. Three concerts in December 2009 at the River Plate Stadium in Argentina were released on a video album, Live at River Plate via DVD on 10 May 2011. An exclusive single from the DVD, featuring the songs "Shoot to Thrill" and "War Machine", was issued on Record Store Day, April 2011. AC/DC released their first live audio album in 20 years, Live at River Plate, on 19 November 2012. In June 2011, AC/DC reissued their concert film, AC/DC: Let There Be Rock, on DVD and Blu-ray. The entire catalogue – excluding T.N.T. (1975) and the Australian versions of High Voltage (1975), Dirty Deeds Done Dirt Cheap (1976) and Let There Be Rock (1977), became available on the iTunes Store the same day. At the conclusion of the Black Ice World Tour in 2010, Malcolm had been diagnosed with lung cancer. It was treated at an early stage and surgery was successful with cancerous tissue removed. He also had an unspecified heart problem and had a pacemaker fitted.

=== 2014–2018: Malcolm Young retires and hiatus ===
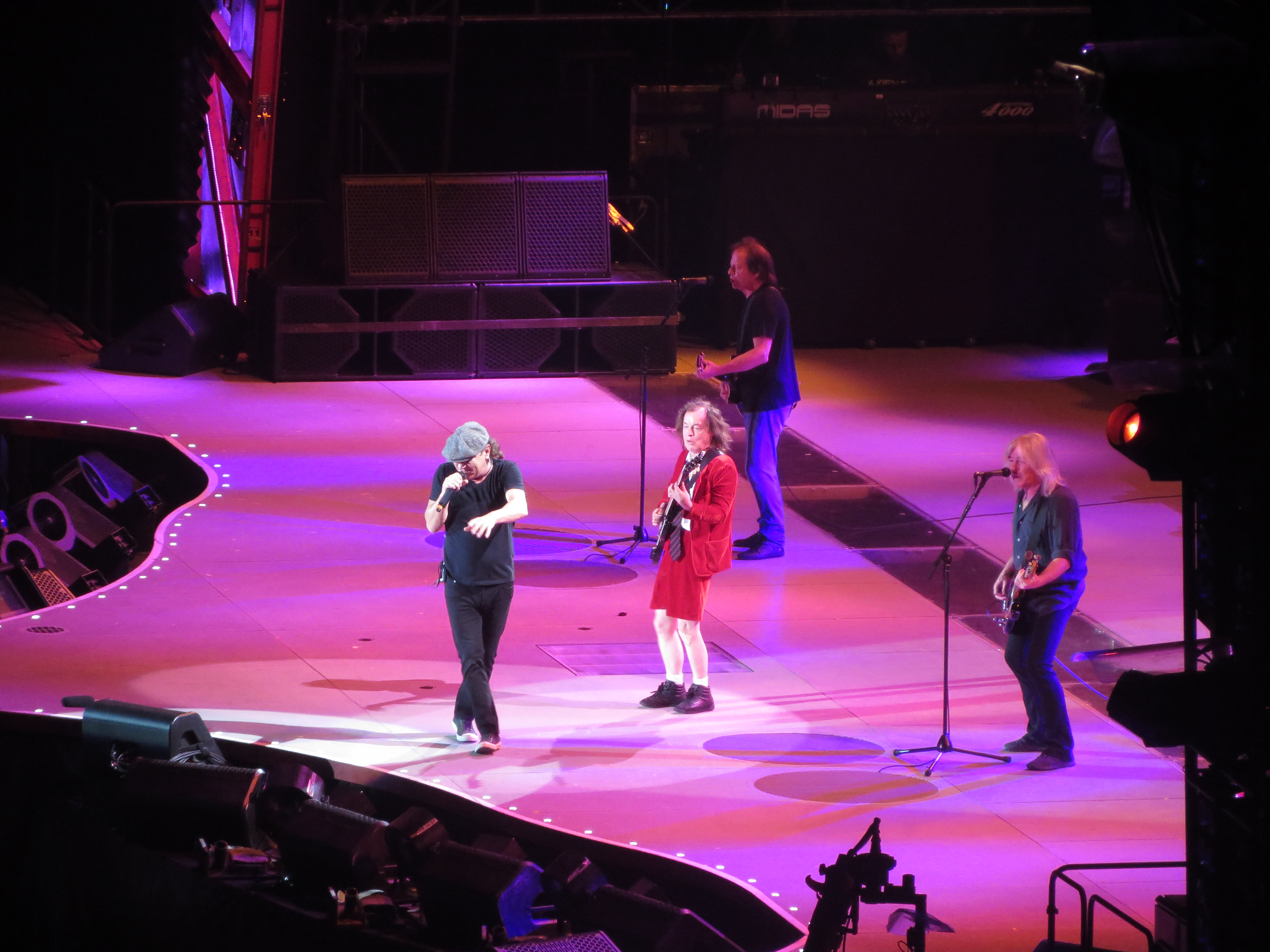
AC/DC's Rock or Bust World Tour, performed in Barcelona in 2015

Malcolm became seriously ill in April 2014 and was unable to continue performing; fans speculated that the group could disband. However, Johnson stated that despite Malcolm's absence, they would return to Vancouver to record their sixteenth studio album, Rock or Bust. In July, AC/DC announced that they had finished recording it and that Stevie had replaced Malcolm in the studio. On 23 September, AC/DC members confirmed that Malcolm had officially retired from performing. Malcolm's last show with the group had been on 28 June 2010 in Bilbao, Spain; he died on 18 November 2017 at the age of 64 due to his dementia. Rudd confirmed that there would be another AC/DC tour and that they had no intention of retiring.

On 23 September 2014, The band revealed that Rock or Bust, featuring eleven tracks, would be released on 28 November as the first AC/DC album in the band's history without Malcolm on the recordings, nevertheless all its compositions were credited to Angus and Malcolm. The album reached number one in Australia, Canada, Germany, and the UK. The band also announced their supporting world tour, with Stevie as Malcolm's replacement.

Rudd was charged with threatening to kill, possession of methamphetamine and possession of cannabis following a police raid on his home on 6 November 2014. AC/DC's members issued a statement clarifying that the tour promoting Rock or Bust would continue but did not indicate whether or not Rudd would participate or whether he was still a member. At a charity signing before the Grammy Awards, the band were photographed together with Slade. It was later confirmed that he had rejoined for the Grammys and tour. In April 2015, Rudd pleaded guilty to drug and threatening to kill charges. Shortly thereafter, the band's website showed that Rudd was replaced by Slade on drums. On 9 July 2015, Rudd was sentenced to eight months of home detention.

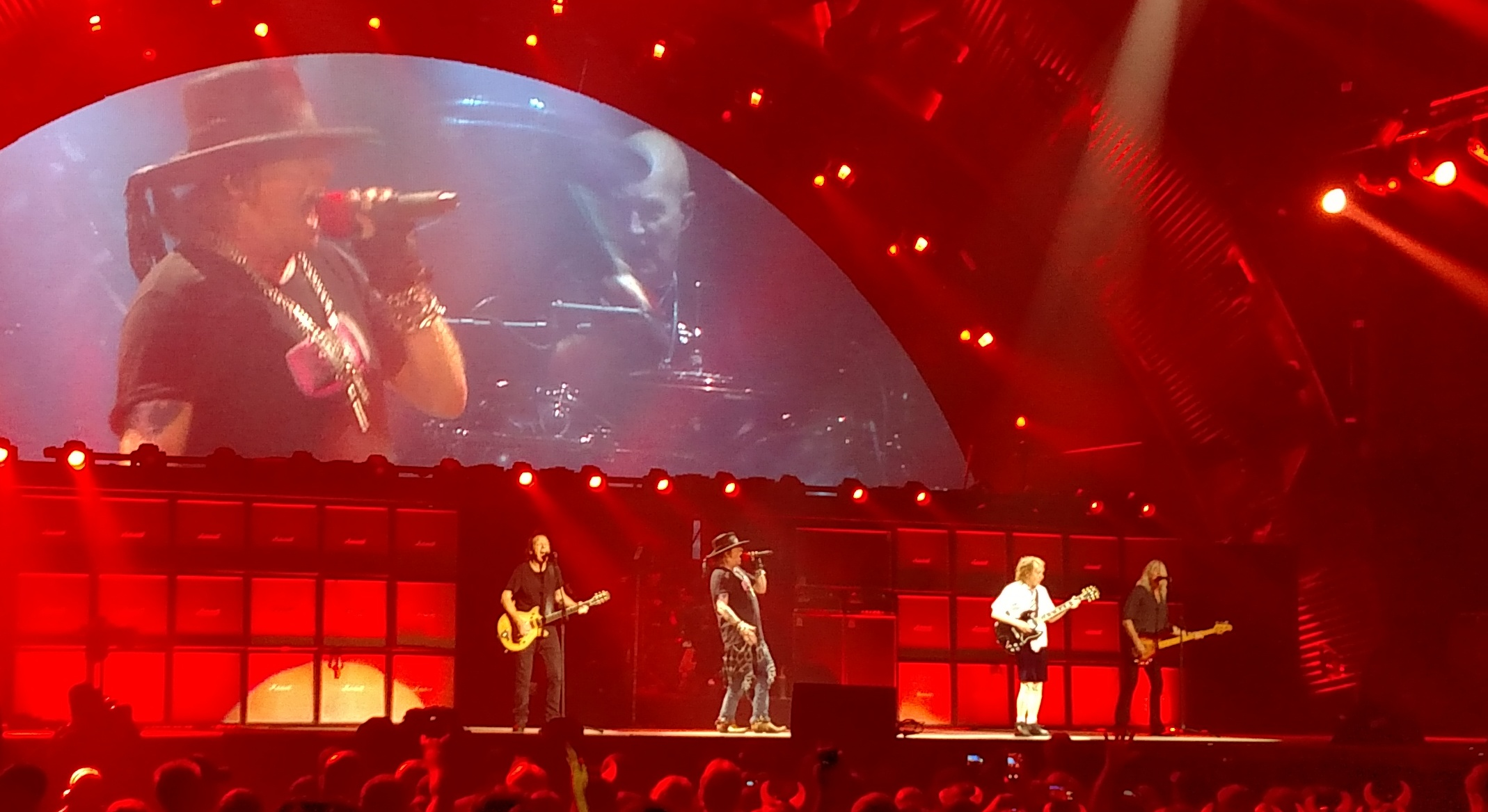
AC/DC with Axl Rose (centre and top left), performing in Washington, D.C., in 2016

On 7 March 2016, the band announced that the final ten dates of the Rock or Bust World Tour would be rescheduled as Johnson's doctors had ordered him to stop touring immediately; he risked complete deafness if he persisted. The ten cancelled dates were to be rescheduled, "likely with a guest vocalist" later in the year, leaving Johnson's future in touring with the group uncertain. On 16 April 2016, Guns N' Roses frontman Axl Rose was announced as the lead vocalist for the remainder of their 2016 tour dates. Williams indicated he was leaving AC/DC after the tour during an interview with Gulfshore Life's Jonathan Foerste on 8 July 2016. At the end of the Rock or Bust World Tour, he released a video statement confirming his departure. His last show with AC/DC before the hiatus was in Philadelphia on 20 September 2016. After completing the tour in 2016, AC/DC went on hiatus. George Young died on 22 October 2017, aged 70.

=== 2018–present: Reunion, Power Up and tour ===
In August 2018, speculation grew that former members Johnson and Rudd were back working with the band. A fan living near The Warehouse Studio, Vancouver claimed to have observed them in the outdoor area of the studio from an apartment window. Shortly afterwards, a photograph of Johnson with Williams at the gymnasium of the Living Shangri-La hotel in Vancouver in December 2018 surfaced, indicating that Williams had also rejoined. AC/DC then confirmed on 30 September 2020 the return of Johnson, Rudd and Williams to the line-up alongside Angus and Stevie, reuniting the Rock or Bust line-up.

On 28 September 2020, the band updated their social media accounts posting a teaser video, which led to speculation of their "comeback, possibly as early as this week or next week." On 1 October, AC/DC released a snippet of their new song "Shot in the Dark". On 7 October, the band confirmed the upcoming release on 13 November of their next studio album, Power Up and issued "Shot in the Dark" as its lead single from the album. The album's track listing was revealed on their website the same day. They had recorded it in August–September 2018 with O'Brien producing at The Warehouse Studio in Vancouver, with some tweaking in Los Angeles in 2019.

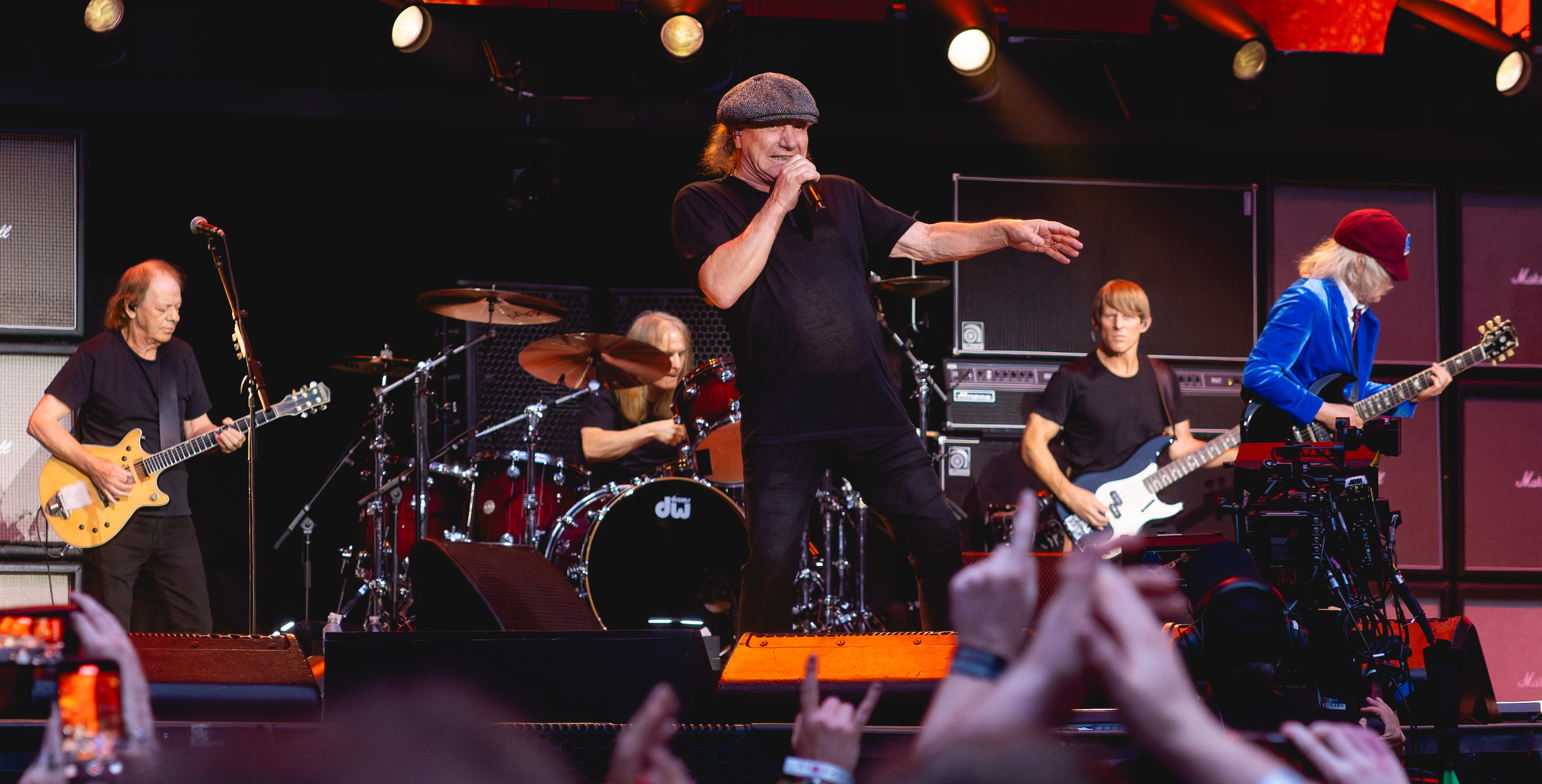
AC/DC performing at Wembley Stadium in 2024. From left to right: Stevie, Matt Laug, Johnson, Chris Chaney and Angus

AC/DC launched a dive bar on 2 October 2023, located at Club 5 Bar in Indio, called the High Voltage Dive Bar. AC/DC performed a co-headlining act for the Power Trip music festival at the Empire Polo Club in Indio, California, on 7 October, which was their first show in seven years, with Williams being part of the line-up after coming out of retirement, and American drummer Matt Laug, who had previously played for Slash's Snakepit and Alice Cooper, replacing Rudd. The band hinted at another tour to occur in 2024; the mayor of Munich, Dieter Reiter, confirmed that they had booked a show in the Olympiastadion for 12 June 2024. Founding drummer Colin Burgess died on 16 December 2023, aged 78.

On 6 February 2024, the band published a teaser on their social media accounts, showing the band's lightning bolt symbol flickering before the words "Are You Ready" appear and their song of the same name plays. This led to fans speculating that they would come back to touring after eight years. On 12 February, the Power Up Tour was announced, with former Jane's Addiction bass guitarist Chris Chaney replacing Williams. The European leg of the tour began on 17 May and concluded on 17 August, with American band The Pretty Reckless as their support act for all twenty-four performances. The band also announced a North American leg in April and May on 2 December 2024, with the Pretty Reckless, an Australian leg in November and December, including a show for the BP Adelaide Grand Final announced on 23 June 2025, with Amyl and the Sniffers as the opening act, and announced a South American and North American leg for February to September 2026 with the Pretty Reckless on 3 November 2025, with an extra show in Winnipeg on 20 September 2026, announced on 16 March.

AC/DC reissued their entire discography on gold vinyl for their 50th anniversary on 15 March, 21 June and 27 September 2024, as part of the AC/DC 50 series. They have also reissued two Australasia-only albums – High Voltage and T.N.T. (both 1975), only available at the High Voltage Dive Bars at Gelsenkirchen, Seville, Munich, London, Paris and Minneapolis.

== Musical style ==
Aside from an early flirtation with glam rock, the group's sound and performance style are based on Australian pub rock. That style was pioneered by Lobby Loyde of Billy Thorpe's early 1970s group, the Aztecs. Vanda noted "the pub crowd as an audience demanded blood—'or else'." He described wanting to "recreate the real Australian pub sound—'not like that American sound, smooth and creamy, nicey, nicey.'" Glenn A. Baker felt they played "rib-crushing, blood-curdling, brain damaging, no bullshit, thunder rock".

The Canberra Times' Tony Catterall reviewed T.N.T., in which "[they] wallow in the lumpen proletarianism that's the home of punk rock" while comparing them with rivals Buster Brown, which are "more imaginative and musically better". Music journalist Ed Nimmervoll summarised, "If we tried to isolate what has characterised Australian rock and roll from the rest of the world's it would be music that's made to be played live, and gets right down to basics with a minimum of distraction. [...] AC/DC captured that essence not long after it crystallised, and they have continued to carry that creed around the world as their own."

Stephen Thomas Erlewine of AllMusic said AC/DC utilizes "dirty" guitar riffs, "snarling" singing, and "catchy, anthemic" hooks. According to Vulture music journalist David Marchese, the instrumental foundation of the band's simple sound was the drummer—Rudd, Wright, or Slade—striking the kick drum on the first and third beat of every measure and the snare drum on the second and fourth beat; bass guitarist Williams consistently down-picking an eighth note; Angus performing lead parts that possessed "a clear architecture and even sort of swing, in a frenzied, half-demented way"; and Malcolm's "propulsive" yet nuanced rhythm guitar featuring "little chuks, stutters, and silences that give the monstrous riffs life."

For the majority of Malcolm's tenure in AC/DC, he used a Marshall Super Bass head to amplify his rhythm guitar while recording in the studio. According to Chris Gill of Guitar World, this amplifier helped define his signature guitar tone: "clean but as loud as possible to ride on the razor's edge of power amp distortion and deliver the ideal combination of grind, twang, clang and crunch, with no distorted preamp 'hair,' fizz or compression", as heard on songs such as "Let There Be Rock", "Dirty Deeds", "For Those About to Rock" and "Thunderstruck". During 1978 to 1980, Malcolm used a Marshall 2203 100-watt master volume head, which Gill speculates may have contributed to a "slightly more distorted and dark" guitar tone on the albums from that period, including Powerage and Back in Black.

In a comparison of AC/DC's vocalists, Robert Christgau said Scott exhibited a "blokelike croak" and "charm", often singing about sexual aggression under the guise of fun: "Like Ian Hunter or Roger Chapman though without their panache, he has fun being a dirty young man". Johnson, in his opinion, possessed "three times the range and wattage" of a vocalist while projecting the character of a "bloke as fantasy-fiction demigod". By the time Johnson had fully acclimated himself to 1981's For Those About to Rock We Salute You, Christgau said he defined "an anthemic grandiosity more suitable to [the band's] precious-metal status than [Scott]'s old-fashioned raunch", albeit in a less intelligent manner.

=== Influences ===
AC/DC's influences include the Rolling Stones, Chuck Berry, Billy Thorpe, the Easybeats and Vanda & Young. The impact of Australian pub rock on AC/DC was documented on ABC's Long Way to the Top (2001). Angus reflected on his playing style: "A lot of it was nerves at first. It was George that told me if you get on stage and play guitar you want to let people know you are doing something. When I started in the band I was shy and had to push myself forward. [...] [Patrons] would be throwing beer cans and I thought 'just keep moving' and that's how it all started." George had taught both Malcolm and Angus "how to play guitar, and playing them classic rock and roll and blues records until that music was like blood in their veins." According to Long Way to the Top's writers, "the hardships of the Australian road would complete AC/DC's training. [Scott] reveled in the lifestyle. Somehow he rose above all the substance abuse to become the ultimate rock and roll front man."

=== Genres ===
AC/DC's music has been variously described as hard rock, blues rock, and heavy metal, but they have referred to themselves as "a rock and roll band, nothing more, nothing less". Malcolm recalled honing their craft. "We'd been playing up to four gigs a day. That really shaped the band... It was a mix of screw you, Jack, and having a good time and all being pretty tough guys... The training ground was Melbourne." In the opinion of Stephen Thomas Erlewine of AllMusic, they are "one of the defining acts of '70s hard rock" and reactionary to the period's art rock and arena rock excesses. "AC/DC's rock was minimalist – no matter how huge and bludgeoning their guitar chords were, there was a clear sense of space and restraint." According to Alexis Petridis, their music is "hard-edged, wilfully basic blues-rock," featuring humorous sexual innuendo and lyrics about rock and roll. Music academic Robert McParland described the band's sound as being defined by the heavy rock guitar of the Young brothers, layered power chords and forceful vocals. "For some, AC/DC are the ultimate heavy metal act," Tim Jonze wrote in The Guardian, "but for others, AC/DC aren't a heavy metal act at all, they're a classic rock band – and calling them heavy metal is an act of treachery." On the controversy of categorising their music, McParland wrote:

AC/DC will assert that they are not specifically a metal band. Their music—loud, hard, and guitar-driven—may best be described as hard rock. However, there are people who will say that they are indisputably metal. Therein lies the ongoing problem of categorisation. While AC/DC has referenced the underworld and they have given their listeners 'Highway to Hell' and 'Hell's Bells,' their songs are constructed on straightforward major and minor power chords. They are not modally developed as are a good deal of heavy metal compositions. Their sound is loud and crisp, not muddy or down-tuned.

With the recording of Back in Black in 1980, rock journalist Joe S. Harrington believed the band had departed further from the blues-oriented rock of their previous albums and toward a more dynamic attack that adopted punk rock's "high-energy implications" and transmuted their hard rock/heavy metal songs into "more pop-oriented blasts". The band would remain faithful to this "impeccably ham-handed" musical style for the remainder of their career: "the guitars were compacted into a singular statement of rhythmic efficiency, the rhythm section provided the thunderhorse overdrive and vocalist Johnson bellowed and brayed like the most unhinged practitioner of bluesy top-man dynamics since vintage Robert Plant."

== Legacy ==
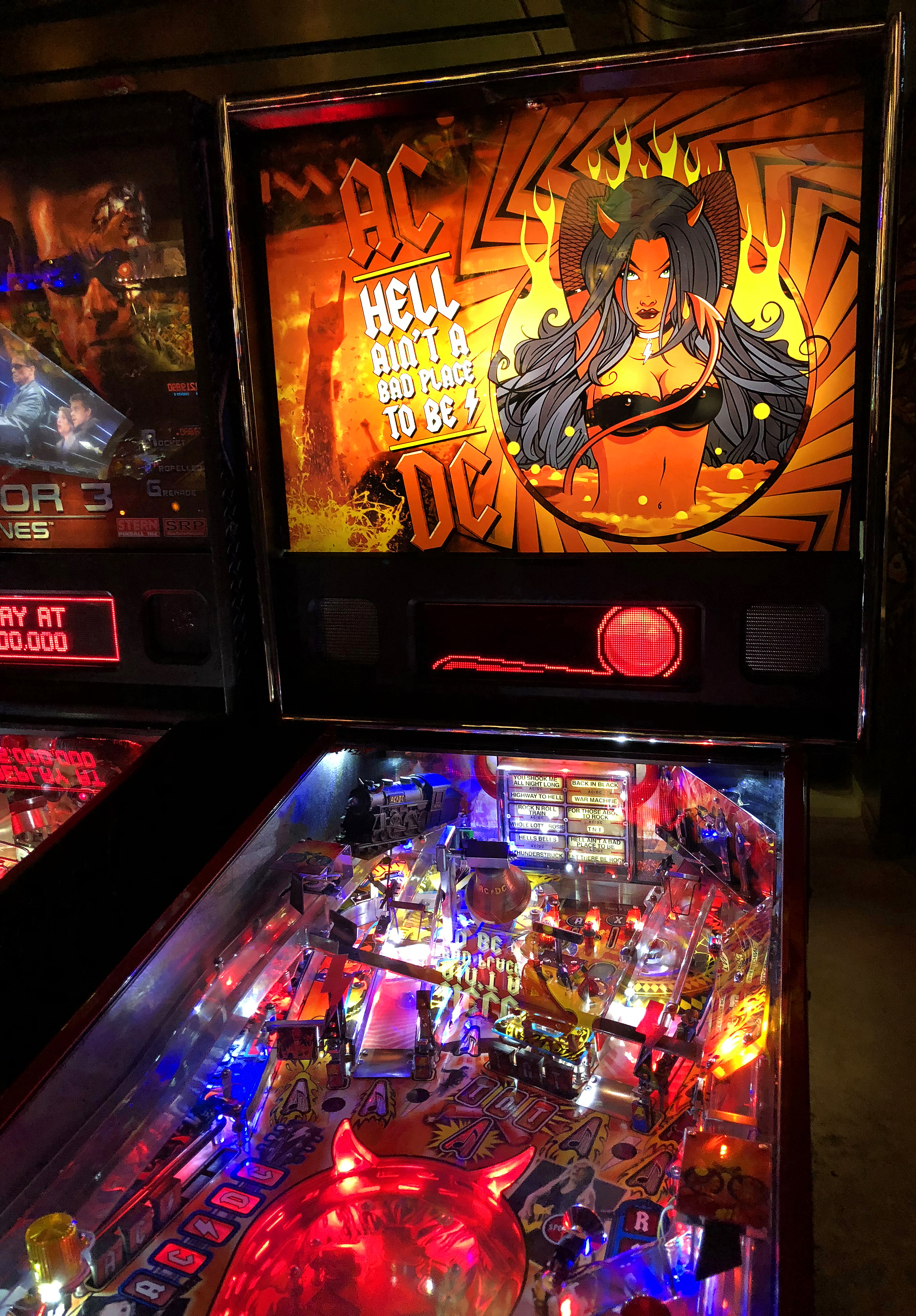
AC/DC themed pinball machine, pictured in Seattle in 2024

Several musicians have credited AC/DC for reasserting hard rock's popularity after it had ceded mainstream attention to other musical genres in the late 1970s. Tom Morello of Rage Against the Machine and Audioslave noted of Back in Black's release: "Disco was huge and punk and new wave were ascendant, and along came this AC/DC record which just destroyed everybody. It put hard rock music back on the throne, where it belongs!"

AC/DC's music was a formative influence on the new wave of British heavy metal bands that emerged in the late 1970s, such as Saxon and Def Leppard, in part as a reaction to the decline of traditional early 1970s hard rock bands. In 2007, critics noted that AC/DC, along with Thin Lizzy, UFO, Scorpions and Judas Priest, were among "the second generation of rising stars ready to step into the breach as the old guard waned." Over the years, many prominent rock musicians have cited AC/DC as an influence, including Dave Mustaine of Megadeth, Josh Homme of Queens of the Stone Age and Kyuss, Dave Grohl of Nirvana and Foo Fighters, Scott Ian of Anthrax, Eric Peterson of Testament, Dexter Holland of the Offspring; Brian Baker of Bad Religion, and bands such as Airbourne, Metallica, Slayer, Exodus, the Cult, and the Living End. Australian acts formed in AC/DC's footsteps are Rose Tattoo and the Angels. Chrissy Amphlett of Australian rockers Divinyls acknowledged Angus' schoolboy outfit as the inspiration for her performing in a schoolgirl's uniform.

Gene Simmons of hard rock contemporaries Kiss remarked, "a lot of people look the same and act the same and do the same thing. Every once in a while you see a band like AC/DC. Nobody's like them. We'd like to think we're unique in that way too." Slash of Guns N' Roses called them "with the exception of the [Rolling] Stones, the greatest rock 'n' roll band ever." "I always liked them," said Australian compatriot and singer-songwriter Nick Cave. "We had this TV show called Countdown and they were often on and they were always a riot and absolutely unique. They were a heavy rock band, but Bon Scott would go on Countdown dressed as a schoolgirl and stuff like that. They were always very anarchic and never took the thing too seriously."

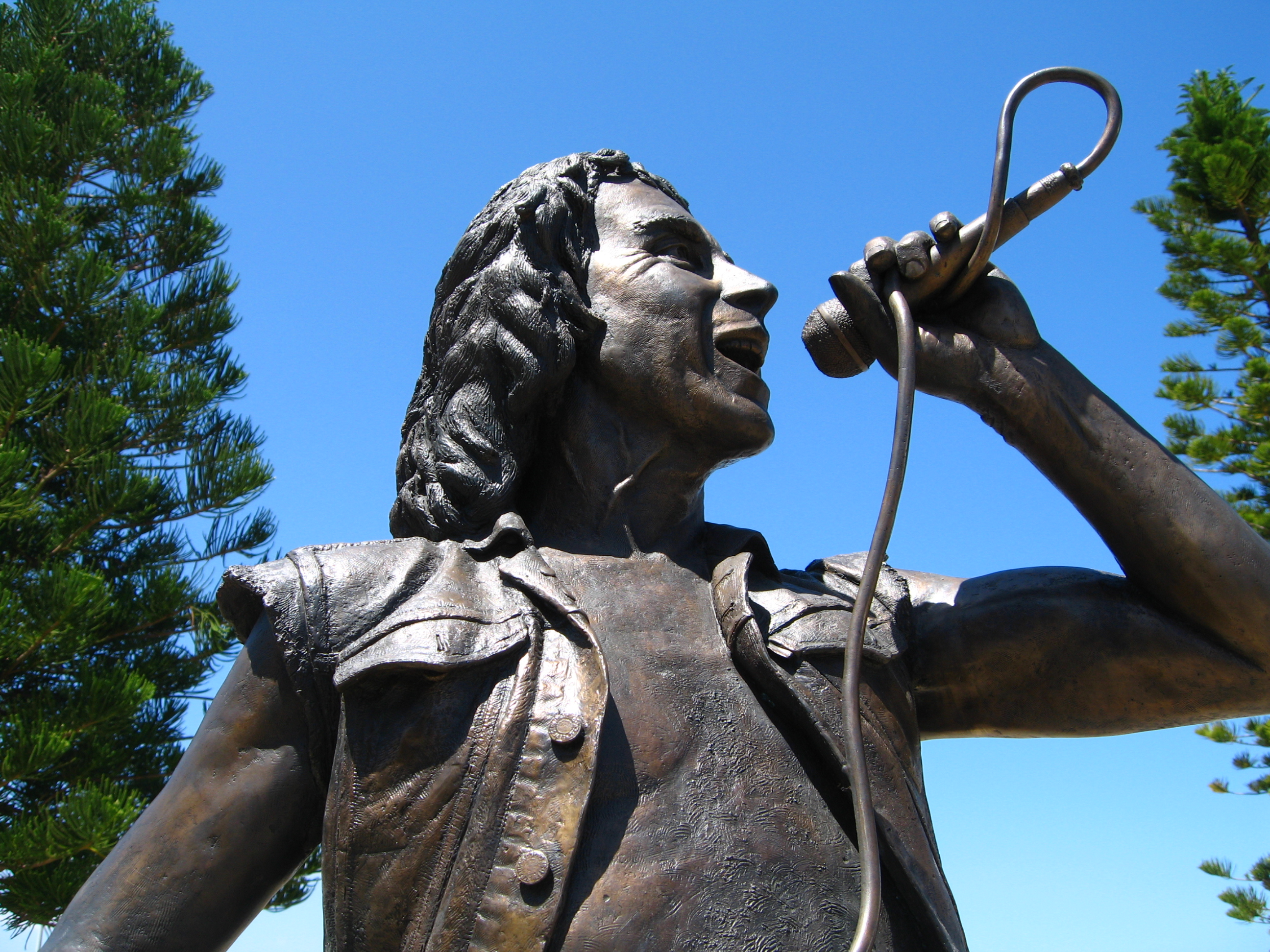
A bronze statue of Bon Scott in Fremantle, Western Australia

AC/DC was not without dissenters. AC/DC and other artists (see Filthy Fifteen) ran afoul of the Satanic panic of the 1980s. This general fear of modern hard rock and heavy metal was greatly increased in the band's case when serial killer Richard Ramirez was arrested. Ramirez, nicknamed the "Night Stalker" by the press, told police that "Night Prowler" from Highway to Hell had driven him to commit murder. Police also claimed that Ramirez was wearing an AC/DC shirt and left an AC/DC hat at one of the crime scenes. Accusations that AC/DC were devil worshippers were made, the lyrics of "Night Prowler" were analysed and some newspapers attempted to link Ramirez's Satanism with AC/DC's name, concluding that AC/DC stood for Anti-Christ/Devil's Child or Devil's Children.

=== Lyrics assessment ===
Throughout the band's career, their songs have been criticised as simplistic, monotonous, deliberately lowbrow and sexist. David Marchese from Vulture wrote that "regardless of the lyricist, whether it was Scott (who was capable of real wit and colour), Johnson, or the Young brothers, there's a deep strain of misogyny in the band's output that veers from feeling terribly dated to straight-up reprehensible." According to Christgau in 1988, "the brutal truth is that sexism has never kept a great rock-and-roller down—from Muddy to Lemmy, lots of dynamite music has objectified women in objectionable ways. But rotely is not among those ways", in regards to AC/DC.

Fans of the band have defended their music by highlighting its "bawdy humour", while members of the group have generally been dismissive of claims that their songs are sexist, arguing that they are meant to be in jest. In an interview with Sylvie Simmons for Mojo, Angus called the band "pranksters more than anything," while Malcolm said, "We're not like some macho band. We take the music far more seriously than we take the lyrics, which are just throwaway lines." Marchese regarded the musical aspect of the Youngs' songs as "strong enough to render the words a functional afterthought" as well as "deceptively plain, devastatingly effective, and extremely lucrative." For the book Under My Thumb: Songs That Hate Women and the Women Who Love Them, The Guardian arts critic Fiona Sturges contributed an essay evaluating her love for AC/DC. While acknowledging she is a feminist and that the band's music is problematic for her, she believed it would be "daft as opposed to damaging" for female listeners if they could understand the band to be "a bunch of archly sex-obsessed idiots with sharp tunes and some seriously killer riffs".

== Awards and achievements ==
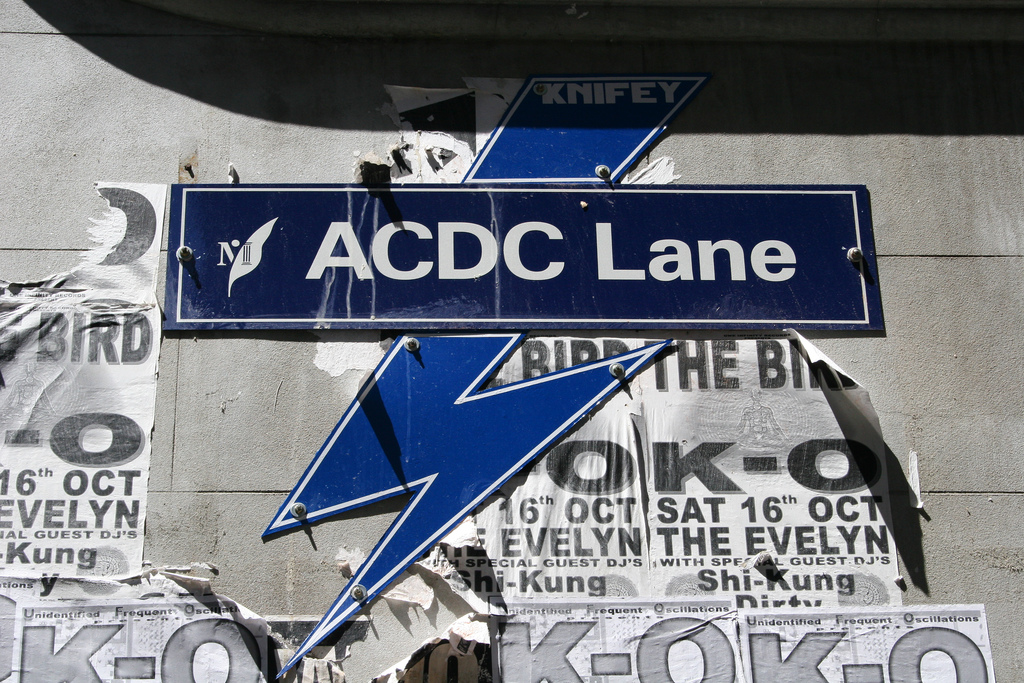
The street sign for ACDC Lane, Melbourne

AC/DC's accolades include one Grammy Award, two Guinness World Records, one iHeartRadio Music Award, three ARIA Music Awards; and eight APRA Awards. Their first ever nomination at an award show was from the American Music Awards of 1982 for Favorite Pop/Rock Band/Duo/Group. In 1988, AC/DC were inducted into the ARIA Hall of Fame.

The municipality of Leganés, near Madrid, named a street in honour of the band "Calle de AC/DC" (English: "AC/DC Street") on 22 March 2000. Malcolm and Angus attended the inauguration with many fans. The plaque had since been stolen numerous times, forcing the municipality of Leganés to begin selling replicas of the official street plaque. On 1 October 2004, a central Melbourne thoroughfare, Corporation Lane, was renamed ACDC Lane in honour of the band. The City of Melbourne forbade the use of the slash character in street names, so the four letters were combined. The lane is near Swanston Street, where, on the back of a truck, the band recorded their video for "It's a Long Way to the Top (If You Wanna Rock 'n' Roll)".

AC/DC were inducted into the Rock and Roll Hall of Fame on 10 March 2003. During the ceremony, the band performed "Highway to Hell" and "You Shook Me All Night Long", with guest vocals provided by host Steven Tyler of Aerosmith. He described the band's power chords as "the thunder from down under that gives you the second most powerful surge that can flow through your body." During the acceptance speech, Johnson quoted their 1977 song "Let There Be Rock". In May 2003, the Young brothers accepted a Ted Albert Award for Outstanding Service to Australian Music at the APRA Music Awards of 2003, during which Malcolm paid special tribute to Scott, who was also a recipient of the award.

On 4 November 2009, AC/DC were announced as the Business Review Weekly top-earning Australian entertainer for 2009, with earnings of A$105 million. This displaced the Wiggles from the number-one spot for the first time in four years. They were also listed in Forbes' Celebrity 100 three times, where they earned $50 million in 2009, $114 million in 2010, and $67.5 million in 2016.

In 2003, Rolling Stone's 500 Greatest Albums of All Time list included Back in Black at number 73, and Highway to Hell at number 199. They also ranked number 72 on the 100 Greatest Artists of All Time, as American record producer Rick Rubin wrote an essay calling them the "greatest rock & roll band of all time." In 2004, on their 500 Greatest Songs of All Time list, Rolling Stone included "Back in Black" at number 187 and "Highway to Hell" at number 254. They ranked number four on VH1's list of the 100 Greatest Artists of Hard Rock, and number seven on MTV's Greatest Heavy Metal Band of All Time. They ranked number 23 on VH1's list of the 100 Greatest Artists of All Time in 2010. On 20 November 2015, the band were inducted into the Music Victoria Awards 10th Anniversary Hall of Fame. Angus offered a statement, in which he declared it was "an absolute honour" to be recognised in the tenth year of the Hall of Fame.

They sold over 1.3 million CDs in the US during 2007. In 50 years of the band's career, they have sold over 200 million records worldwide, and 84 million in the US, according to the Recording Industry Association of America (RIAA), which made AC/DC the fourth best-selling band in US history and the eighth best-selling artist, selling more albums than Elton John and Mariah Carey. The RIAA also certified Back in Black as 27× Platinum, for 27 million in US sales, which made it the fourth best-selling album of all time in the US. The album also became the second best-selling album of all time, after selling an estimated 50 million records worldwide.

== Band members ==
=== Current ===
- Angus Young – lead guitar, occasional backing vocals (1973–present)
- Phil Rudd – drums (1975–1983, 1994–2015, 2018–present; not touring since 2023)
- Cliff Williams – bass guitar, backing vocals (1977–2016, 2018–present; not touring since 2024)
- Brian Johnson – lead vocals (1980–2016, 2018–present)
- Stevie Young – rhythm guitar, backing vocals (2014–present; touring only in 1988)

Current touring musicians

- Matt Laug – drums (2023–present)
- Chris Chaney – bass guitar, backing vocals (2024–present)

== Discography ==
Studio albums

- High Voltage (1975) (Australasia only)
- T.N.T. (1975) (Australasia only)
- High Voltage (1976) (international version)
- Dirty Deeds Done Dirt Cheap (1976)
- Let There Be Rock (1977)
- Powerage (1978)
- Highway to Hell (1979)
- Back in Black (1980)
- For Those About to Rock We Salute You (1981)
- Flick of the Switch (1983)
- Fly on the Wall (1985)
- Blow Up Your Video (1988)
- The Razors Edge (1990)
- Ballbreaker (1995)
- Stiff Upper Lip (2000)
- Black Ice (2008)
- Rock or Bust (2014)
- Power Up (2020)

== Concert tours ==
- T.N.T./Lock Up Your Daughters Tour (1975–1976)
- Dirty Deeds Done Dirt Cheap/Giant Dose of Rock 'n' Roll Tour (1976–1977)
- Let There Be Rock Tour (1977)
- Powerage Tour (1978)
- If You Want Blood Tour (1978–1979)
- Highway to Hell Tour (1979–1980)
- Back in Black Tour (1980–1981)
- For Those About to Rock Tour (1981–1982)
- Flick of the Switch Tour (1983–1985)
- Fly on the Wall Tour (1985–1986)
- Who Made Who Tour (1986)
- Blow Up Your Video World Tour (1988)
- Razors Edge World Tour (1990–1991)
- Ballbreaker World Tour (1996)
- Stiff Upper Lip World Tour (2000–2001)
- Black Ice World Tour (2008–2010)
- Rock or Bust World Tour (2015–2016)
- Power Up Tour (2024–2026)

== See also ==
- List of best-selling music artists
- List of blues rock musicians
- List of hard rock bands (A–M)
- List of heavy metal bands
