= Flick of the Switch Tour =

1983–1985 concert tour by AC/DC

- Tour by AC/DC
- Poster to the concert in Paris, France
- Location: Europe; North America; South America
- Associated album: Flick of the Switch
- Start date: 14 October 1983
- End date: 19 January 1985
- Legs: 3
- No. of shows: 65

AC/DC concert chronology
- For Those About to Rock Tour (1981–1982); Flick of the Switch Tour (1983–1985); Fly on the Wall Tour (1985–1986)

The Flick of the Switch Tour was a concert tour by the Australian hard rock band AC/DC, in support of their ninth studio album, Flick of the Switch, which was released on 15 August 1983.

== Background ==
The Flick of the Switch tour took place in North America during the fall of 1983 when it was initially postponed, with the band performing on the Monsters of Rock Tour in 1984 alongside Van Halen. The North American leg had lower attendance for some shows on the tour, with mixed reviews coming in for the album. At the sold out show in New York City, the audience were described as "crazy as ever", with the band's music barely being heard over the audience. In 1985, during the recording of the Fly on the Wall album, the band took some time off studio to play two concerts at the Rock in Rio Festival in Brazil, on 15 January and 19 January, along with Scorpions, Ozzy Osbourne and Whitesnake, in front of 400,000 in attendance. The stage design for the tour featured two cannons and pyrotechnics which was handled by Pete Cappadocia.

This was the first AC/DC tour to feature drummer Simon Wright, after the departure of Phil Rudd.

During the Tacoma Dome performance, two fans, a 21-year-old Fort Lewis soldier and a 14-year-old female fired off a skyrocket at the ceiling, burning a hole through it and causing damage costs of $25,000. They were both placed into jail, the 21-year-old later sentenced to three years of hard labor, while the 14-year-old was placed in a juvenile facility.

== Tour dates ==
List of 1983 concerts, showing date, city, country and venue
| Date | City | Country | Venue |
|---|---|---|---|
| 11 October 1983 | Vancouver | Canada | Pacific Coliseum |
| 13 October 1983 | Tacoma | United States | Tacoma Dome |
| 14 October 1983 | Portland | United States | Memorial Coliseum |
| 17 October 1983 | Inglewood | United States | The Forum |
| 18 October 1983 | Inglewood | United States | The Forum |
| 19 October 1983 | Daly City | United States | Cow Palace |
| 22 October 1983 | Tempe | United States | Compton Terrace Amphitheatre |
| 23 October 1983 | Albuquerque | United States | Tingley Coliseum |
| 24 October 1983 | Denver | United States | McNichols Sports Arena |
| 26 October 1983 | Kansas City | United States | Kemper Arena |
| 27 October 1983 | Dallas | United States | Reunion Arena |
| 28 October 1983 | San Antonio | United States | HemisFair Arena |
| 29 October 1983 | Austin | United States | Frank Erwin Center |
| 30 October 1983 | Houston | United States | The Summit |
| 1 November 1983 | Memphis | United States | Mid-South Coliseum |
| 2 November 1983 | St. Louis | United States | St. Louis Arena |
| 3 November 1983 | Indianapolis | United States | Market Square Arena |
| 4 November 1983 | Notre Dame | United States | Edmund P. Joyce Center |
| 6 November 1983 | Saint Paul | United States | St. Paul Civic Center |
| 7 November 1983 | Peoria | United States | Peoria Civic Center |
| 8 November 1983 | Omaha | United States | Omaha Civic Auditorium |
| 9 November 1983 | Rosemont | United States | Rosemont Horizon |
| 11 November 1983 | Cincinnati | United States | Riverfront Coliseum |
| 12 November 1983 | Lexington | United States | Rupp Arena |
| 13 November 1983 | Roanoke | United States | Roanoke Civic Center |
| 14 November 1983 | Philadelphia | United States | The Spectrum |
| 15 November 1983 | Philadelphia | United States | The Spectrum |
| 16 November 1983 | Evansville | United States | Roberts Municipal Stadium |
| 17 November 1983 | Detroit | United States | Joe Louis Arena |
| 18 November 1983 | Detroit | United States | Joe Louis Arena |
| 20 November 1983 | Atlanta | United States | The Omni |
| 21 November 1983 | Atlanta | United States | The Omni |
| 22 November 1983 | Birmingham | United States | Birmingham–Jefferson Convention Complex |
| 23 November 1983 | Bilxoi | United States | Mississippi Coast Coliseum |
| 25 November 1983 | Pembroke Pines | United States | Hollywood Sportatorium |
| 26 November 1983 | Lakeland | United States | Lakeland Civic Center |
| 27 November 1983 | Columbia | United States | Carolina Coliseum |
| 28 November 1983 | Hampton | United States | Hampton Coliseum |
| 30 November 1983 | Pittsburgh | United States | Pittsburgh Civic Arena |
| 1 December 1983 | Buffalo | United States | Buffalo Memorial Auditorium |
| 2 December 1983 | Worcester | United States | Worcester Centrum |
| 3 December 1983 | Worcester | United States | Worcester Centrum |
| 4 December 1983 | Hartford | United States | Hartford Civic Center |
| 5 December 1983 | New York City | United States | Madison Square Garden |
| 6 December 1983 | Providence | United States | Providence Civic Center |
| 8 December 1983 | Uniondale | United States | Nassau Veterans Memorial Coliseum |
| 9 December 1983 | East Rutherford | United States | Brendan Byrne Arena |
| 10 December 1983 | New Haven | United States | New Haven Coliseum |
| 11 December 1983 | Landover | United States | Capital Centre |
| 12 December 1983 | Landover | United States | Capital Centre |
| 14 December 1983 | Richfield | United States | Richfield Coliseum |
| 15 December 1983 | Toronto | Canada | Maple Leaf Gardens |
| 16 December 1983 | Montreal | Canada | Montreal Forum |

List of 1984 concerts, showing date, city, country and venue
| Date | City | Country | Venue |
|---|---|---|---|
| 11 August 1984 | San Sebastián | Spain | Velódromo de Anoeta |
| 18 August 1984 | Castle Donington | England | Donington Park |
| 25 August 1984 | Stockholm | Sweden | Råsunda Stadium |
| 31 August 1984 | Winterthur | Switzerland | Stadion Schützenwiese |
| 1 September 1984 | Karlsruhe | West Germany | Wildparkstadion |
| 2 September 1984 | Nuremberg | West Germany | Stadion am Dutzendteich |
| 5 September 1984 | Rome | Italy | Nettuno Stadio Comunale |
| 7 September 1984 | Turin | Italy | Stadio Olimpico di Torino |
| 11 September 1984 | Paris | France | Palais Omnisports de Paris-Bercy |
| 12 September 1984 | Lyon | France | Halle Tony Garnier |

List of 1985 concerts, showing date, city, country and venue
| Date | City | Country | Venue |
|---|---|---|---|
| 15 January 1985 | Rio de Janeiro | Brazil | Cidade do Rock |
| 19 January 1985 | Rio de Janeiro | Brazil | Cidade do Rock |

== Personnel ==
- Angus Young – lead guitar
- Cliff Williams – bass guitar, backing vocals
- Malcolm Young – rhythm guitar, backing vocals
- Simon Wright – drums
- Brian Johnson – lead vocals
