= Rock or Bust World Tour =

2015–2016 concert tour by AC/DC

- Tour by AC/DC
- Promotional poster for the tour
- Location: Australia; Europe; New Zealand; North America
- Associated album: Rock or Bust
- Start date: 10 April 2015
- End date: 20 September 2016
- Legs: 7
- No. of shows: 88
- Supporting acts: Vintage Trouble; The Hives; Kingswood; Shihad; Villainy; Tyler Bryant & the Shakedown; Black Box Revelation; Doctor Victor; Massendefekt
- Box office: $301.3 million (Note: $404.2 million in 2025 dollars.)

AC/DC concert chronology
- Black Ice World Tour (2008–2010); Rock or Bust World Tour (2015–2016); Power Up Tour (2024–2026)

The Rock or Bust World Tour was a 2015–2016 concert tour by the Australian rock band AC/DC, in support of their sixteenth studio album Rock or Bust, which was released on 28 November 2014. This tour had 7 legs around the world lasting more than 17 months starting on 10 April 2015 in Indio, California and finishing on 20 September 2016 in Philadelphia, Pennsylvania.

== Background ==
Malcolm Young was replaced by his and Angus' nephew Stevie Young and Phil Rudd was replaced by their former drummer Chris Slade. They have both played for AC/DC on the Blow Up Your Video World Tour and the Razors Edge World Tour, respectively.

In Germany, the band set a new world record in the number of sold tickets within the shortest timespan, with more than 300,000 tickets sold out in seventy-seven minutes.

In Switzerland, AC/DC set another new record in the duration to a 'sold out' concert. The concert in Zurich was sold out in 6 minutes (over 40,000 tickets)

AC/DC played at the 57th Annual Grammy Awards, performing "Rock or Bust" and "Highway to Hell" on 8 February 2015.

The last 22 shows were rescheduled as Brian Johnson was ordered to stop touring immediately. Ten shows from 8 March 2016 to 4 April 2016 were cancelled and had to be rescheduled, with Axl Rose of Guns N' Roses appearing in Johnson's place marking first time that AC/DC has featured a lead vocalist other than Brian Johnson since they concluded the Highway to Hell Tour on 27 January 1980.

As part of this tour, AC/DC performed the first concert at the Olympic Stadium in London since its redevelopment following the 2012 Olympic and Paralympic Games.

Longtime bassist Cliff Williams announced that he would retire upon completion of the tour, citing losing interest following the health issues with Malcolm Young and Brian Johnson, and the legal issues with Phil Rudd.

The band broke their normal routine at the end of the final concert, with Young leading Williams out to the front of the stage to take a final bow. Axl Rose also introduced the band members one by one.

Johnson, Rudd, and Williams later returned to the band.

== Grossing ==
The Rock or Bust World Tour was the second most attended tour of 2015 behind One Direction and third highest-grossing tour behind Taylor Swift and One Direction (Pollstar Year End Top 100 Worldwide tours of 2015). The tour grossed $180 million from 54 shows in 2015. and $40.1 million from 32 shows in 2016. There was a total gross of $221.1 million from 86 shows performed. 2.31 million fans attended the tour's 2015 dates and the band played to an estimated 4 million fans worldwide for the entire tour.

== Set list ==
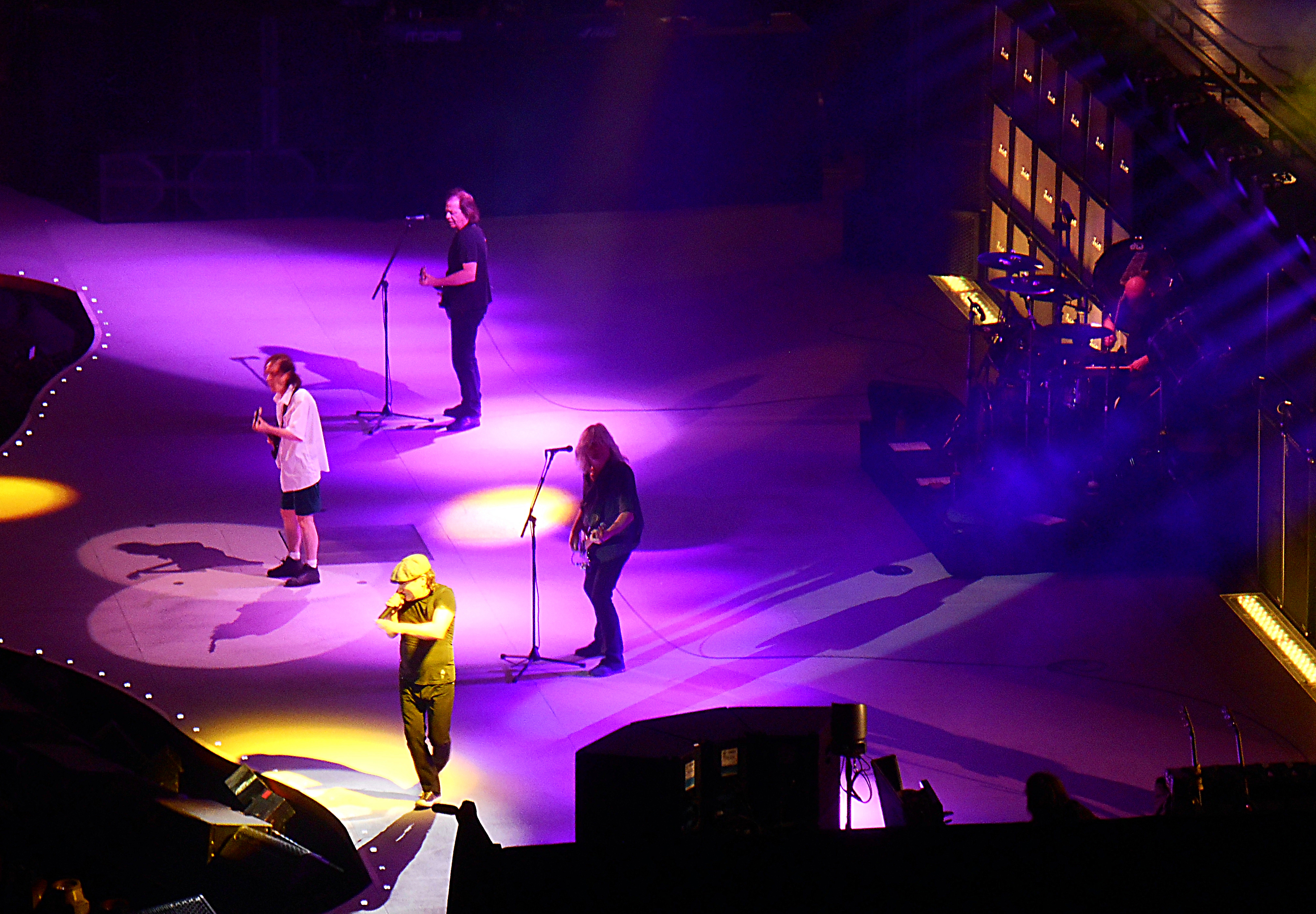
AC/DC performing in Tacoma, Washington on 2 February 2016.

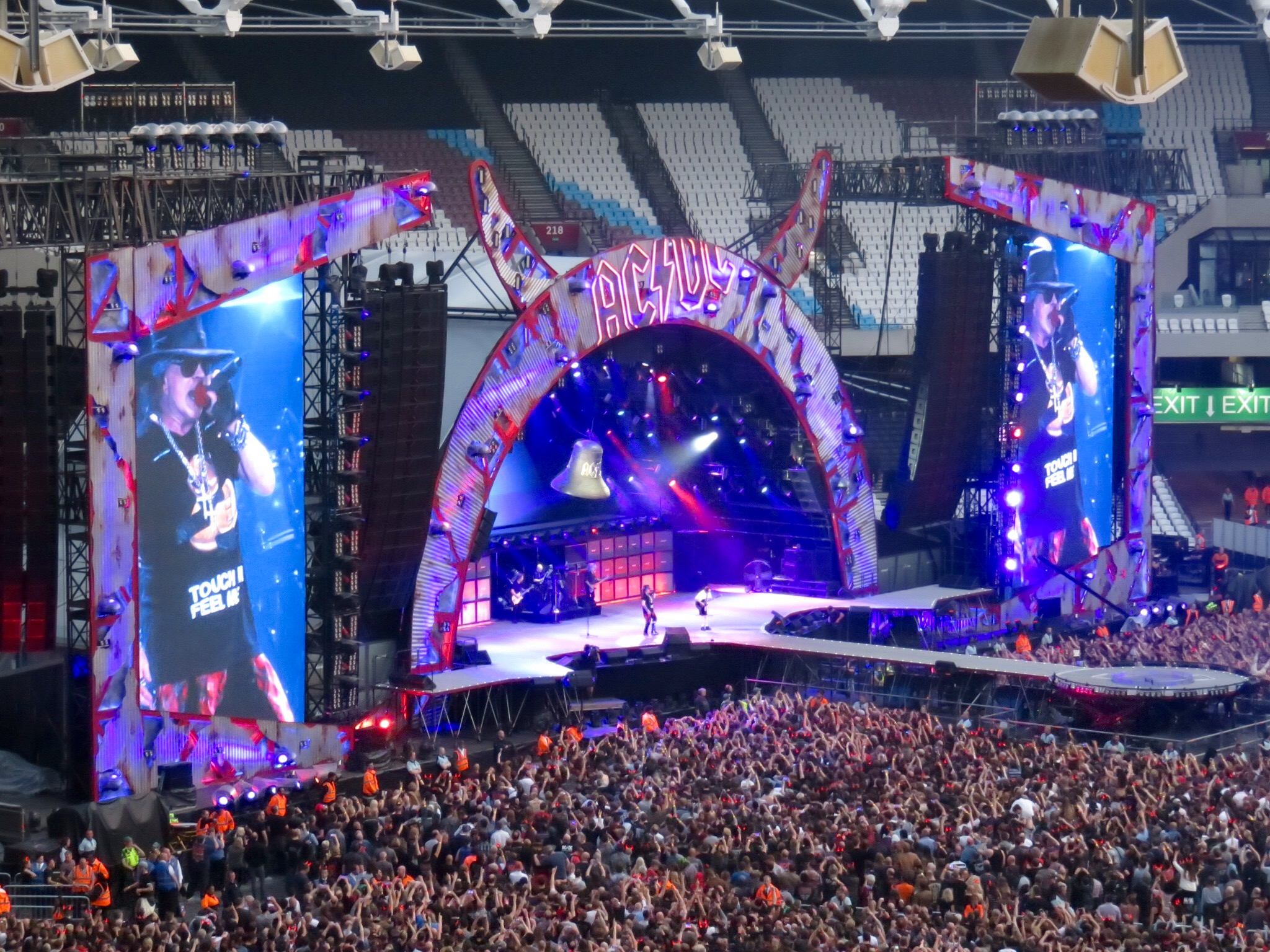
AC/DC with Axl Rose performing the first concert at the Olympic Stadium in London, on 4 June 2016.

1. "Rock or Bust"
2. "Shoot to Thrill"
3. "Hell Ain't a Bad Place to Be"
4. "Back in Black"
5. "Play Ball"^{[a]}
6. "Got Some Rock & Roll Thunder"^{[b]}
7. "Dirty Deeds Done Dirt Cheap"
8. "Rock 'n' Roll Damnation"^{[b]}
9. "Thunderstruck"
10. "High Voltage"
11. "Rock 'n' Roll Train"
12. "Hells Bells"
13. "Baptism by Fire"^{[a]}
14. "Givin' the Dog a Bone"^{[b]}
15. "Dog Eat Dog"^{[b]}
16. "If You Want Blood (You've Got It)"^{[b]}
17. "Touch Too Much"^{[b]}
18. "Live Wire"^{[b]}
19. "Sin City"
20. "You Shook Me All Night Long"
21. "Shot Down in Flames"
22. "Have a Drink on Me"
23. "T.N.T."
24. "Whole Lotta Rosie"
25. "Let There Be Rock" (including Angus Young's guitar solo)

Encore

26. "Highway to Hell"
27. "Riff Raff"^{[b]}
28. "Problem Child"^{[b]}
29. "For Those About to Rock (We Salute You)"

Notes

- a. Played only in 2015.
- b. Played only in 2016.

== Tour dates ==
List of 2015 concerts
Date (2015)	City	Country	Venue	Opening act	Attendance	Revenue
10 April (Note: These shows were a part of Coachella Valley Music and Arts Festival.)	Indio	United States	Empire Polo Club	—N/a	198,000 / 198,000	$28,088,088
17 April	Indio	United States	Empire Polo Club	—N/a	198,000 / 198,000	$28,088,088
5 May	Arnhem	Netherlands	GelreDome	Vintage Trouble	—	—
8 May	Nuremberg	Germany	Zeppelinfeld	Vintage Trouble	—	—
10 May	Dresden	Germany	Ostragehege	Vintage Trouble	—	—
14 May	Zeltweg	Austria	Red Bull Ring	Vintage Trouble	—	—
16 May	Hockenheim	Germany	Hockenheimring	Vintage Trouble	—	—
19 May	Munich	Germany	Olympiastadion	Vintage Trouble	—	—
21 May	Munich	Germany	Olympiastadion	Vintage Trouble	—	—
23 May	Paris	France	Stade de France	Vintage Trouble	—	—
26 May	Paris	France	Stade de France	Vintage Trouble	—	—
29 May	Barcelona	Spain	Estadi Olímpic Lluís Companys	Vintage Trouble	—	—
31 May	Madrid	Spain	Vicente Calderón Stadium	Vintage Trouble	—	—
2 June	Madrid	Spain	Vicente Calderón Stadium	Vintage Trouble	—	—
5 June	Zürich	Switzerland	Letzigrund Stadion	Vintage Trouble	—	—
7 June	Zürich	Switzerland	Letzigrund Stadion	Vintage Trouble	—	—
19 June	Cologne	Germany	Jahnwiesen	Vintage Trouble	—	—
21 June	Hanover	Germany	Hanover Fairground	Vintage Trouble	—	—
25 June	Berlin	Germany	Olympiastadion	Vintage Trouble	—	—
28 June	Glasgow	Scotland	Hampden Park	Vintage Trouble	50,335 / 50,335	$5,126,269
1 July	Dublin	Ireland	Aviva Stadium	Vintage Trouble	—	—
4 July	London	England	Wembley Stadium	Vintage Trouble	—	—
6 July	Dessel	Belgium	Festivalpark Stenehei	Vintage Trouble	—	—
9 July	Imola	Italy	Autodromo Enzo e Dino Ferrari	Vintage Trouble	90,034 / 90,034	$7,482,298
12 July	Gelsenkirchen	Germany	Veltins-Arena	Vintage Trouble	—	—
15 July	Roskilde	Denmark	Roskilde Festival Site	Vintage Trouble	—	—
17 July	Oslo	Norway	Valle Hovin	Vintage Trouble	—	—
19 July	Stockholm	Sweden	Friends Arena	Vintage Trouble	—	—
22 July	Hämeenlinna	Finland	Kantola Event Park	Vintage Trouble	55,000 / 55,000	$5,016,055
25 July	Warsaw	Poland	National Stadium	Vintage Trouble	—	—
22 August	Foxborough	United States	Gillette Stadium	Vintage Trouble	—	—
26 August	East Rutherford	United States	MetLife Stadium	Vintage Trouble	48,881 / 50,000	$4,492,251
28 August	Quebec City	Canada	Plains of Abraham	Vintage Trouble	48,588 / 58,000	$4,047,480
31 August	Montreal	Canada	Olympic Stadium	Vintage Trouble	36,917 / 46,100	$3,238,650
3 September	Ottawa	Canada	TD Place Stadium	Vintage Trouble	—	—
5 September	Moncton	Canada	Magnetic Hill Concert Site	Vintage Trouble	—	—
8 September	Detroit	United States	Ford Field	Vintage Trouble	—	—
10 September	Toronto	Canada	Downsview Park	Vintage Trouble	—	—
15 September	Chicago	United States	Wrigley Field	Vintage Trouble	29,732 / 29,732	$3,024,480
17 September	Winnipeg	Canada	Investors Group Field	Vintage Trouble	—	—
20 September	Edmonton	Canada	Commonwealth Stadium	Vintage Trouble	—	—
22 September	Vancouver	Canada	BC Place	Vintage Trouble	—	—
25 September	San Francisco	United States	AT&T Park	Vintage Trouble	46,167 / 46,167	$4,446,189
28 September	Los Angeles	United States	Dodger Stadium	Vintage Trouble	46,215 / 46,215	$3,975,040
4 November	Sydney	Australia	ANZ Stadium	The Hives; Kingswood	—	—
7 November	Sydney	Australia	ANZ Stadium	The Hives; Kingswood	—	—
12 November	Brisbane	Australia	Queensland Sport and Athletics Centre	The Hives; Kingswood	—	—
14 November	Brisbane	Australia	Queensland Sport and Athletics Centre	The Hives; Kingswood	—	—
21 November	Adelaide	Australia	Adelaide Oval	The Hives; Kingswood	42,384 / 42,384	$3,950,376
27 November	Perth	Australia	Domain Stadium	The Hives; Kingswood	—	—
29 November	Perth	Australia	Domain Stadium	The Hives; Kingswood	—	—
6 December	Melbourne	Australia	Docklands Stadium	The Hives; Kingswood	—	—
8 December	Melbourne	Australia	Docklands Stadium	The Hives; Kingswood	—	—
12 December	Wellington	New Zealand	Westpac Stadium	Shihad; Villainy	—	—
15 December	Auckland	New Zealand	Western Springs Stadium	Shihad; Villainy	—	—

List of 2016 concerts
Date (2016)	City	Country	Venue	Opening act	Attendance	Revenue
2 February	Tacoma	United States	Tacoma Dome	Tyler Bryant & The Shakedown	21,337 / 21,337	$2,544,102
5 February	Paradise	United States	MGM Grand Garden Arena	Tyler Bryant & The Shakedown	13,817 / 13,817	$1,416,474
8 February	Denver	United States	Pepsi Center	Tyler Bryant & The Shakedown	—	—
11 February	Fargo	United States	Fargodome	Tyler Bryant & The Shakedown	19,308 / 19,308	$2,049,080
14 February	Saint Paul	United States	Xcel Energy Center	Tyler Bryant & The Shakedown	14,858 / 14,858	$2,010,470
17 February	Chicago	United States	United Center	Tyler Bryant & The Shakedown	13,773 / 13,773	$1,696,155
20 February	St. Louis	United States	Scottrade Center	Tyler Bryant & The Shakedown	13,985 / 14,320	$1,520,878
23 February	Dallas	United States	American Airlines Center	Tyler Bryant & The Shakedown	13,727 / 14,391	$1,519,861
26 February	Houston	United States	Toyota Center	Tyler Bryant & The Shakedown	—	—
28 February (Note: This show was originally scheduled for 29 February 2016, but has been pushed back to the previous day to allow vocalist Brian Johnson to attend a funeral of a close friend.)	Kansas City	United States	Sprint Center	Tyler Bryant & The Shakedown	13,146 / 13,146	$1,612,754
7 May	Lisbon	Portugal	Passeio Marítimo de Algés	Tyler Bryant & The Shakedown	—	—
10 May	Seville	Spain	Estadio de La Cartuja	Tyler Bryant & The Shakedown	—	—
13 May	Marseille	France	Stade Vélodrome	Tyler Bryant & The Shakedown	—	—
16 May	Werchter	Belgium	Werchter Festival Ground	Tyler Bryant & The Shakedown; Black Box Revelation	—	—
19 May	Vienna	Austria	Ernst-Happel-Stadion	Tyler Bryant & The Shakedown	—	—
22 May	Prague	Czech Republic	Letnany Airport	Tyler Bryant & The Shakedown; Doctor Victor	—	—
26 May	Hamburg	Germany	Volksparkstadion	Tyler Bryant & The Shakedown	—	—
29 May	Bern	Switzerland	Stade de Suisse	Tyler Bryant & The Shakedown	—	—
1 June	Leipzig	Germany	Red Bull Arena	Tyler Bryant & The Shakedown	—	—
4 June	London	England	Olympic Stadium	Tyler Bryant & The Shakedown	—	—
9 June	Manchester	England	City of Manchester Stadium	Tyler Bryant & The Shakedown	—	—
12 June	Aarhus	Denmark	Ceres Park	Tyler Bryant & The Shakedown	—	—
15 June	Düsseldorf	Germany	Esprit Arena	Tyler Bryant & The Shakedown; Massendefekt	—	—
27 August (Note: This show from 27 August 2016 was originally scheduled for 14 March 2016, but was postponed due to Brian Johnson being told by the doctors to stop touring immediately or risk of total hearing loss.)	Greensboro	United States	Greensboro Coliseum	Tyler Bryant & The Shakedown	12,320 / 13,898	$1,268,400
30 August (Note: This show from 30 August 2016 was originally scheduled for 11 March 2016, but was postponed due to Brian Johnson being told by the doctors to stop touring immediately or risk of total hearing loss.)	Sunrise	United States	BB&T Center	Tyler Bryant & The Shakedown	11,930 / 12,944	$1,263,029
1 September (Note: This show from 1 September 2016 was originally scheduled for 14 March 2016, but was postponed due to Brian Johnson being told by the doctors to stop touring immediately or risk of total hearing loss.)	Atlanta	United States	Philips Arena	Tyler Bryant & The Shakedown	11,173 / 13,012	$1,169,355
4 September (Note: This show from 4 September 2016 was originally scheduled for 23 March 2016, but was postponed due to Brian Johnson being told by the doctors to stop touring immediately or risk of total hearing loss.)	Columbus	United States	Nationwide Arena	Tyler Bryant & The Shakedown	11,032 / 15,771	$1,366,460
6 September (Note: This show from 6 September 2016 was originally scheduled for 26 March 2016, but was postponed due to Brian Johnson being told by the doctors to stop touring immediately or risk of total hearing loss.)	Cleveland	United States	Quicken Loans Arena	Tyler Bryant & The Shakedown	8,355 / 9,113	$901,870
9 September (Note: This show from 9 September 2016 was originally scheduled for 20 March 2016, but was postponed due to Brian Johnson being told by the doctors to stop touring immediately or risk of total hearing loss.)	Auburn Hills	United States	The Palace of Auburn Hills	Tyler Bryant & The Shakedown	7,897 / 12,626	$904,984
11 September (Note: This show from 11 September 2016 was originally scheduled for 29 March 2016, but was postponed due to Brian Johnson being told by the doctors to stop touring immediately or risk of total hearing loss.)	Buffalo	United States	KeyBank Center	Tyler Bryant & The Shakedown	—	—
14 September (Note: This show from 14 September 2016 was originally scheduled for 4 April 2016, but was postponed due to Brian Johnson being told by the doctors to stop touring immediately or risk of total hearing loss.)	New York City	United States	Madison Square Garden	Tyler Bryant & The Shakedown	13,737 / 13,737	$1,555,320
17 September (Note: This show from 6 September 2016 was originally scheduled for 17 March 2016, but was postponed due to Brian Johnson being told by the doctors to stop touring immediately or risk of total hearing loss.)	Washington, D.C.	United States	Verizon Center	Tyler Bryant & The Shakedown	11,708 / 14,182	$1,423,688
20 September (Note: This show from 6 September 2016 was originally scheduled for 1 April 2016, but was postponed due to Brian Johnson being told by the doctors to stop touring immediately or risk of total hearing loss.)	Philadelphia	United States	Wells Fargo Center	Tyler Bryant & The Shakedown	14,089 / 14,089	$1,216,141
Total					—	$221,100,000

== Personnel ==
- Brian Johnson – lead vocals (April 10, 2015–February 28, 2016)
- Angus Young – lead guitar
- Cliff Williams – bass guitar, backing vocals
- Stevie Young – rhythm guitar, backing vocals
- Chris Slade – drums

Additional musicians

- Axl Rose – lead vocals (May 7–September 20, 2016)
