= Head Job =

Studio album by Phil Rudd
- Released: 29 August 2014
- Genre: Hard rock
- Length: 40:02
- Label: Universal
- Producer: Phil Rudd

Head Job is the first solo album by AC/DC drummer Phil Rudd, released on 29 August 2014. Rudd, who lives in New Zealand, recorded the album with two local musicians whom he had known for 25 years: guitarist Geoffrey Martin and bass guitarist and vocalist Allan Badger. Having worked on solo material since the 1980s between his two stints as drummer with AC/DC, Rudd recorded the final version of the album with his band in Auckland in 2014. The first single from the album, "Repo Man", was released in July 2014. A music video for the song "Head Job" was released in November 2016.

== Composition ==
Rudd wrote many of the lyrics for the album, and sings on some tracks. He said, "When I was on the road with AC/DC sometimes people would say, 'Come on... sing'. But I'm a drummer. But I do a bit on Head Job." He added, "There's plenty of Phil, but no filler".

"Universal said, 'It's got eight songs. Can you go to eleven?'" he recalled. "Have you seen Spinal Tap? I was fucking born on thirteen. So we knocked out the others."

Rudd drew from personal experience when writing the album, describing it as "about the shit that goes on". He added that the title track was about "going to the pub to commiserate with your mates about someone doing your head in".

== Reception ==
Reception to the album's launch was poor, and this led to Rudd being charged with threatening to kill – charges which were later dropped. However, further legal problems led to Rudd being replaced by Chris Slade for AC/DC's Rock or Bust World Tour. He said in May 2015, "I got back here and the people who I had working for me for this launch – it was a total fucking disaster. So I was really pissed off."

== Track listing ==
All songs written by Phil Rudd, Allan Badger and Geoffrey Martin.

1. "Head Job" – 3:35
2. "Sun Goes Down" – 2:51
3. "Lonely Child" – 4:03
4. "Lost in America" – 3:43
5. "Crazy" – 3:53
6. "Bad Move" – 2:41
7. "No Right" – 4:08
8. "The Other Side" – 4:31
9. "Forty Days" – 3:34
10. "Repo Man" – 3:23
11. "When I Get My Hands on You" – 4:06

== Personnel ==
- Phil Rudd – drums, vocals
- Geoffrey Martin – guitar
- Allan Badger – bass guitar, vocals
- Produced by Phil Rudd
- Tracks 3–9 engineered by Phil Rudd at Mountain Recording Studios; tracks 1–2, 10–11 engineered by Hayden Taylor at York Street Studios, Auckland
- Mastered by Hayden Taylor
