= Back in Black Tour =

1980–1981 concert tour by AC/DC

- Tour by AC/DC
- Poster to the first concert with Brian Johnson in Namur, Belgium
- Location: Asia; Australia; Europe; North America
- Associated album: Back in Black
- Start date: 29 June 1980
- End date: 28 February 1981
- Legs: 5
- No. of shows: 143

AC/DC concert chronology
- Highway to Hell Tour (1979–1980); Back in Black Tour (1980–1981); For Those About to Rock Tour (1981–1982)

The Back in Black Tour was a concert tour by the Australian hard rock band AC/DC in support of their seventh studio album Back in Black, which was released on 25 July 1980.

== Background ==
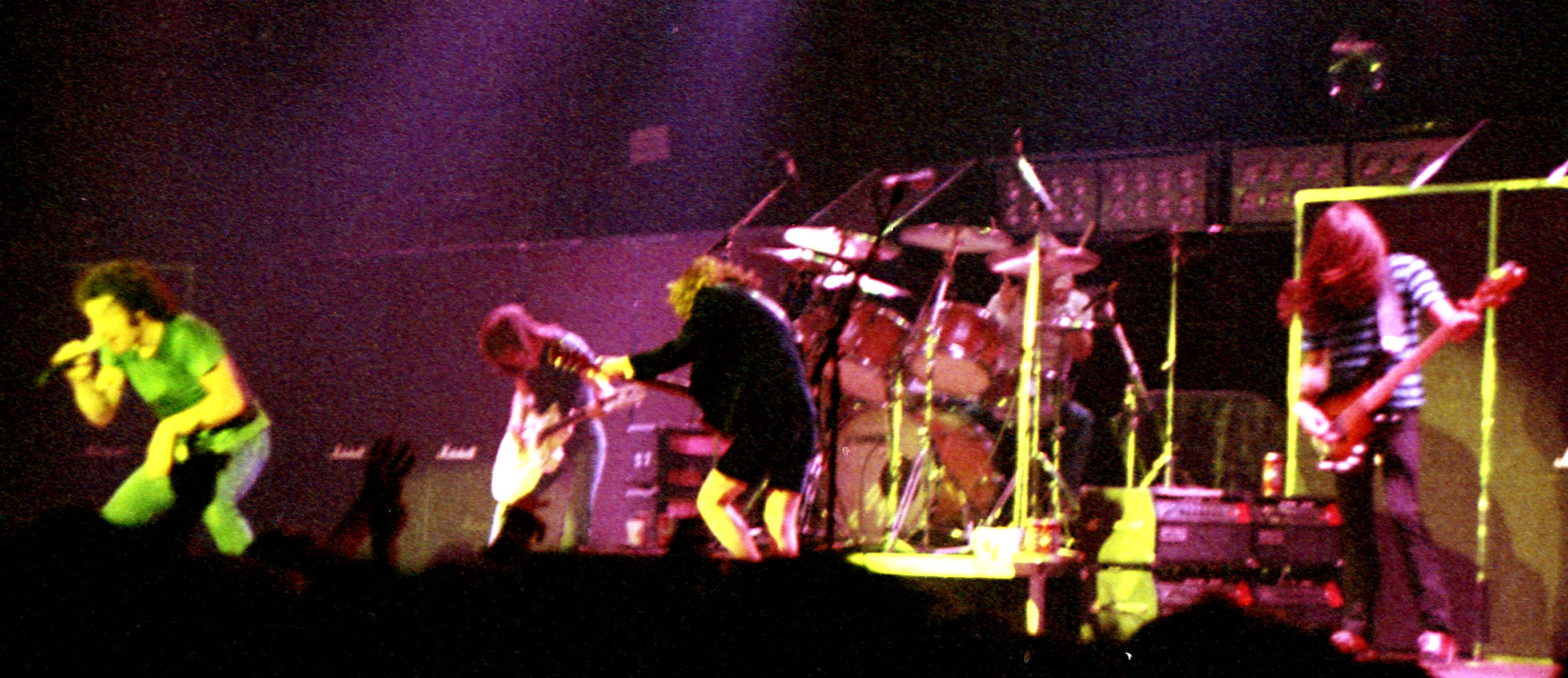
AC/DC performing on 20 October 1980

This was AC/DC's first tour with new vocalist Brian Johnson, who replaced Bon Scott after the latter's death in February 1980, making his first appearance on stage on 29 June 1980 in Namur, Belgium. The band transported their own one-ton "Hells Bell" on the road, which was lowered to the stage each night as the bell tolls of "Hells Bells" were heard. Johnson would finish it off with several hard hits, hammer in hand as the band commenced the show.

During the North American and European legs, the band were supported by a number of different opening acts, including Humble Pie, Def Leppard, ZZ Top, Blackfoot, Gamma, Whitesnake and Maggie Bell.

== Reception ==
The responses from the audience during the band's performances in the United Kingdom were described as near rabid with anticipation.

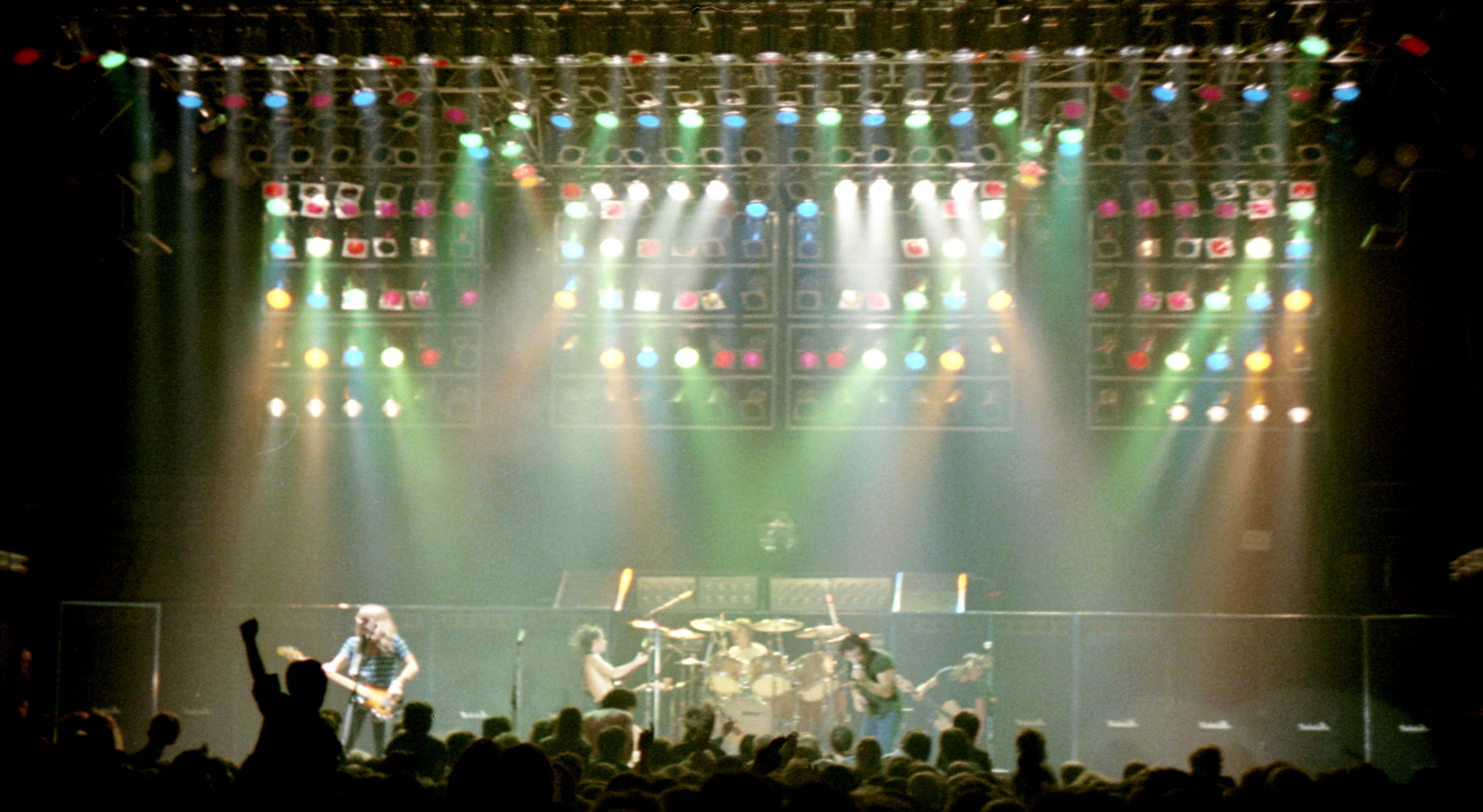
Full stage at De Montfort Hall in Leicester, 20 October 1980

Mike London from Billboard, however, had given the show he attended in New York a negative review - stating that while the band had established itself as a leader in heavy metal, the show lacked imagination and failed to live up to the band's sound, describing the stage theatrics as lifeless and overused. He noted that the fans attending the show had shown a general positive response, but later in the show grew tired of the poses and solos that Angus Young had given. Concluding his review, London stated his disappointment - saying that AC/DC's music deserved better treatment than what the band performed that night.

== Tour dates ==
List of 1980 concerts, showing date, city, country and venue
Date	City	Country	Venue
29 June 1980	Namur	Belgium	Palais des Expositions
30 June 1980	Antwerp	Belgium	Borgerhout-Zaal Cine Roma
1 July 1980	Deinze	Belgium	Brielpoort
2 July 1980	Arlon	Belgium	Hall Polyvalent
3 July 1980	Breda	Netherlands	Het Turfschip
5 July 1980	Wateringen	Netherlands	Velo Sporthal
13 July 1980	Edmonton	Canada	Northlands Coliseum
14 July 1980	Calgary	Canada	Max Bell Arena
16 July 1980	Vancouver	Canada	Pacific Coliseum
19 July 1980	Winnipeg	Canada	Winnipeg Arena
20 July 1980	Thunder Bay	Canada	Fort William Gardens
22 July 1980	Ottawa	Canada	Ottawa Civic Center
23 July 1980	Montreal	Canada	Montreal Forum
25 July 1980	London	Canada	London Gardens
26 July 1980	Kitchener	Canada	Kitchener Memorial Auditorium
27 July 1980	Sudbury	Canada	Sudbury Community Arena
28 July 1980	Toronto	Canada	Maple Leaf Gardens
30 July 1980	Erie	United States	Erie County Fieldhouse
31 July 1980	Philadelphia	United States	The Spectrum
1 August 1980	New York City	United States	Palladium
3 August 1980	Landover	United States	Capital Centre
6 August 1980	Norfolk	United States	The Scope
7 August 1980	Roanoke	United States	Roanoke Civic Center
8 August 1980	Charlotte	United States	Charlotte Coliseum
9 August 1980	Fayetteville	United States	Cumberland County Arena
10 August 1980	Greensboro	United States	Greensboro Coliseum
12 August 1980	Atlanta	United States	Fox Theatre
13 August 1980	Knoxville	United States	James White Civic Coliseum
15 August 1980	Johnson City	United States	Freedom Hall Civic Center
16 August 1980	Cincinnati	United States	Riverfront Coliseum
17 August 1980	Toledo	United States	Toledo Speedway
18 August 1980	Dayton	United States	Hara Arena
19 August 1980	Lexington	United States	Rupp Arena
20 August 1980	Nashville	United States	Nashville Municipal Auditorium
22 August 1980	Lakeland	United States	Lakeland Civic Center
23 August 1980	West Palm Beach	United States	West Palm Beach Auditorium
24 August 1980	Jacksonville	United States	Jacksonville Memorial Coliseum
26 August 1980	Houston	United States	Sam Houston Coliseum
27 August 1980 (Note: This concert was an unannounced club gig.)	Houston	United States	Agora
29 August 1980 (Note: Originally scheduled for 28 August 1980.)	San Antonio	United States	San Antonio Convention Center
30 August 1980	Dallas	United States	Dallas Convention Center
31 August 1980	Amarillo	United States	Amarillo Civic Center
1 September 1980	El Paso	United States	El Paso County Coliseum
4 September 1980	Long Beach	United States	Long Beach Arena
5 September 1980	Daly City	United States	Cow Palace
6 September 1980	Oakland	United States	Oakland Auditorium
7 September 1980 (Note: Originally scheduled for 3 September 1980.)	San Bernardino	United States	Orange Pavilion
10 September 1980	Lincoln	United States	Pershing Auditorium
11 September 1980	Bloomington	United States	Met Center
13 September 1980	Milwaukee	United States	Milwaukee Auditorium
14 September 1980	Madison	United States	Dane County Coliseum
16 September 1980	Normal	United States	Horton Fieldhouse
18 September 1980	St. Louis	United States	Kiel Opera House
19 September 1980	Cedar Rapids	United States	Five Seasons Center
20 September 1980	Rosemont	United States	Rosemont Horizon
21 September 1980	Fort Wayne	United States	Allen County War Memorial Coliseum
24 September 1980	Indianapolis	United States	Market Square Arena
25 September 1980	Louisville	United States	Louisville Gardens
26 September 1980	Kalamazoo	United States	Wings Stadium
27 September 1980	Detroit	United States	Cobo Arena
29 September 1980	Columbus	United States	St. John Arena
30 September 1980	Pittsburgh	United States	Stanley Theatre
1 October 1980 (Note: Originally scheduled for 5 October 1980.)	Cleveland	United States	Public Hall
3 October 1980	Rochester	United States	War Memorial Auditorium
4 October 1980	Buffalo	United States	Buffalo Memorial Auditorium
5 October 1980	Syracuse	United States	Onondaga War Memorial Auditorium
7 October 1980	Bethlehem	United States	Stabler Arena
8 October 1980	Uniondale	United States	Nassau Veterans Memorial Coliseum
9 October 1980	Springfield	United States	Springfield Civic Center
10 October 1980	Boston	United States	Orpheum Theatre
11 October 1980	Boston	United States	Orpheum Theatre
19 October 1980	Bristol	England	Colston Hall
20 October 1980	Leicester	England	De Montfort Hall
21 October 1980	Leicester	England	De Montfort Hall
22 October 1980	Birmingham	England	Birmingham Odeon
23 October 1980	Birmingham	England	Birmingham Odeon
25 October 1980	Manchester	England	Apollo Theatre
26 October 1980	Manchester	England	Apollo Theatre
27 October 1980	Sheffield	England	Sheffield City Hall
28 October 1980	Sheffield	England	Sheffield City Hall
29 October 1980	Hanley	England	Victoria Hall
31 October 1980	Newcastle	England	Mayfair Ballroom
1 November 1980	Glasgow	Scotland	Apollo Theatre
2 November 1980	Glasgow	Scotland	Apollo Theatre
4 November 1980	Newcastle	England	City Hall
5 November 1980	Newcastle	England	City Hall
6 November 1980	Queensferry	England	Deeside Leisure Center
7 November 1980	Southampton	England	Gaumont
8 November 1980	Southampton	England	Gaumont
10 November 1980	London	England	Hammersmith Odeon
11 November 1980	London	England	Hammersmith Odeon
12 November 1980	London	England	Hammersmith Odeon
14 November 1980	London	England	Apollo Victoria Theatre
15 November 1980	London	England	Apollo Victoria Theatre
16 November 1980	London	England	Apollo Victoria Theatre
20 November 1980	Stockholm	Sweden	Göta Lejon
22 November 1980	Oslo	Norway	Chateau Neuf
24 November 1980	Kiel	West Germany	Ostseehalle
25 November 1980	Köln	West Germany	Sporthalle
26 November 1980	Hanover	West Germany	Eilenriedehalle
27 November 1980	West Berlin	West Germany	Deutschlandhalle
29 November 1980	Paris	France	Le Bourget
30 November 1980	Paris	France	Le Bourget
2 December 1980	Nürnberg	West Germany	Messezentrum
3 December 1980	Heidelberg	West Germany	Rhein-Neckar-Halle
4 December 1980	Essen	West Germany	Grugahalle
5 December 1980	Bremen	West Germany	Stadthalle
7 December 1980	Frankfurt	West Germany	Festhalle
8 December 1980	Boblingen	West Germany	Sporthalle Böblingen
9 December 1980	Saarbrücken	West Germany	Saarlandhalle
10 December 1980	Hamburg	West Germany	Messehallen
11 December 1980	Hamburg	West Germany	Messehallen
13 December 1980	Strasbourg	France	Hall Rhenus
14 December 1980	Zürich	Switzerland	Hallenstadion
16 December 1980	Ravensburg	West Germany	Oberschwabenhalle
17 December 1980	Munich	West Germany	Olympiahalle
19 December 1980	Lyon	France	Palais des Sports
20 December 1980	Lille	France	Foire Expo Internationale

List of 1981 concerts, showing date, city, country and venue
Date	City	Country	Venue
8 January 1981	Metz	France	Parc Expo
9 January 1981	Besançon	France	Palais des Sports
10 January 1981	Grenoble	France	Alpexpo
11 January 1981	Nice	France	Trinite Stade Municipal
13 January 1981	Avignon	France	Parc Exposition de Chateaublanc
15 January 1981	Barcelona	Spain	Palacio Municipal Deportes
17 January 1981	Madrid	Spain	Pabellon de Deportivo del Real Madrid
18 January 1981 (Note: Originally scheduled for 20 January 1981.)	San Sebastián	Spain	Velodromo Anoeta de San Sebastian
19 January 1981	Toulouse	France	Hall Expo
20 January 1981	Pau	France	Foire Expo Hall F
22 January 1981	Le Mans	France	La Rotonde
23 January 1981	Brest	France	Parc de Penfeld
24 January 1981	Caen	France	Hall Expo
25 January 1981	Brussels	Belgium	Forest National
1 February 1981	Osaka	Japan	Expo Hall
2 February 1981	Nagoya	Japan	Shi Kokaido Hall
4 February 1981	Tokyo	Japan	Nihon Seinenkan
5 February 1981	Tokyo	Japan	Nihon Seinenkan
13 February 1981	Perth	Australia	Perth Entertainment Centre
17 February 1981	Adelaide	Australia	Memorial Drive
23 February 1981 (Note: Originally scheduled for 20 February 1981.)	Sydney	Australia	Sydney Showground
24 February 1981	Brisbane	Australia	Festival Hall
25 February 1981	Brisbane	Australia	Festival Hall
27 February 1981	Melbourne	Australia	Sidney Myer Music Bowl
28 February 1981	Melbourne	Australia	Sidney Myer Music Bowl

=== Cancelled dates ===
List of cancelled dates, showing date, city, country, venue and reason for cancellation
Date (1980)	City	Country	Venue	Reason
6 July	Nijmegen	Netherlands	De Vereeniging	Low ticket sales (120 sold)
16 August	Thornville	United States	Legend Valley	—N/a
27 August	Lafayette	United States	Le Centre Civique	—N/a
19 November	Copenhagen	Denmark	Odd Fellow Palæet	Stage set did not fit

=== Box office score data ===
List of box office score data with date, city, venue, attendance, gross, references
Date (1980)	City	Venue	Attendance	Gross	Ref(s)
14 July	Calgary, Canada	Max Bell Arena	3,426	$33,072	
16 July	Vancouver, Canada	Pacific Coliseum	8,197	$73,773	
20 July	Thunder Bay, Canada	Fort William Gardens	4,249	$34,929	
28 July	Toronto, Canada	Maple Leaf Gardens	8,500	$80,750	
1 August	New York City, United States	Palladium	3,385	$30,400	
13 August	Knoxville, United States	Coliseum	6,886	$54,170	
15 August	Johnson City, United States	Freedom Hall	6,146	$48,959	
6 September	Oakland, United States	Auditorium	6,500	$62,350	
10 September	Lincoln, United States	Pershing Auditorium	4,529	$35,343	
13 September	Milwaukee, United States	Auditorium	6,000	$51,493	
14 September	Madison, United States	Dane County Coliseum	10,100	$80,701	
18 September	St. Louis, United States	Kiel Opera House	3,519	$30,367	
27 September	Detroit, United States	Cobo Arena	11,137	$107,843	
30 September	Pittsburgh, United States	Stanley Theatre	3,742	$32,002	
3 October	Rochester, United States	War Memorial Auditorium	10,200	$76,331	
10–11 October	Boston, United States	Orpheum Theatre	5,600	$51,059	

== Personnel ==
- Angus Young – lead guitar
- Cliff Williams – bass guitar, backing vocals
- Malcolm Young – rhythm guitar, backing vocals
- Phil Rudd – drums
- Brian Johnson – lead vocals
