= Play Ball (song) =

2014 single by AC/DC

Single by AC/DC

from the album Rock or Bust
- Released: 7 October 2014
- Recorded: May – July 2014
- Studio: The Warehouse (Vancouver)
- Genre: Hard rock
- Length: 2:48
- Label: Albert; Columbia
- Songwriters: Angus Young; Malcolm Young
- Producer: Brendan O'Brien

AC/DC singles chronology
"Shoot to Thrill (live)" (2011)	"Play Ball" (2014)	"Rock or Bust" (2014)

Music video
- "Play Ball" on YouTube

"Play Ball" is a single by the Australian hard rock band AC/DC, and the first single from their 2014 album Rock or Bust. It was first used on 27 September 2014 in a trailer for Major League Baseball on TBS post-season coverage, and the single was released on 7 October. It is the first single to feature rhythm guitarist Stevie Young, replacing founding member Malcolm Young who had retired from the band for health reasons.

AC/DC's drummer, Phil Rudd, was absent from the video shoot for the single, and was replaced by the Welshman Bob Richards, who had previously played with Man, Adrian Smith, Asia and Shogun.

The Minnesota Twins play the song at home in Target Field directly after the game's line-up is announced. It plays for about two minutes before the game starts. The Danish basketball team, Svendborg Rabbits, play the song in connection with the game starts at home in The Rabbits House. Also the Austrian football club Grazer AK plays the song before home games.

The song was shortlisted for Song of the Year at the APRA Music Awards of 2015.

== Charts ==
Chart (2014–15)	Peak position
Austria (Ö3 Austria Top 40)	44
Belgium (Ultratop 50 Flanders)	45
Belgium (Ultratop 50 Wallonia)	23
Canada Hot 100 (Billboard)	53
Canada Rock (Billboard)	5
Denmark (Tracklisten)	15
France (SNEP)	39
Germany (GfK)	39
Italy (FIMI)	85
Japan Hot 100 (Billboard)	90
Scottish Singles Sales (Official Charts)	37
Slovenia (SloTop50)	46
Spain (Promusicae)	28
Switzerland (Schweizer Hitparade)	19
UK Singles (Official Charts)	85
UK Rock & Metal (Official Charts)	3
US Hot Rock & Alternative Songs (Billboard)	17
US Rock & Alternative Airplay (Billboard)	21
