= Olympiahalle =

Multi-purpose arena in Munich

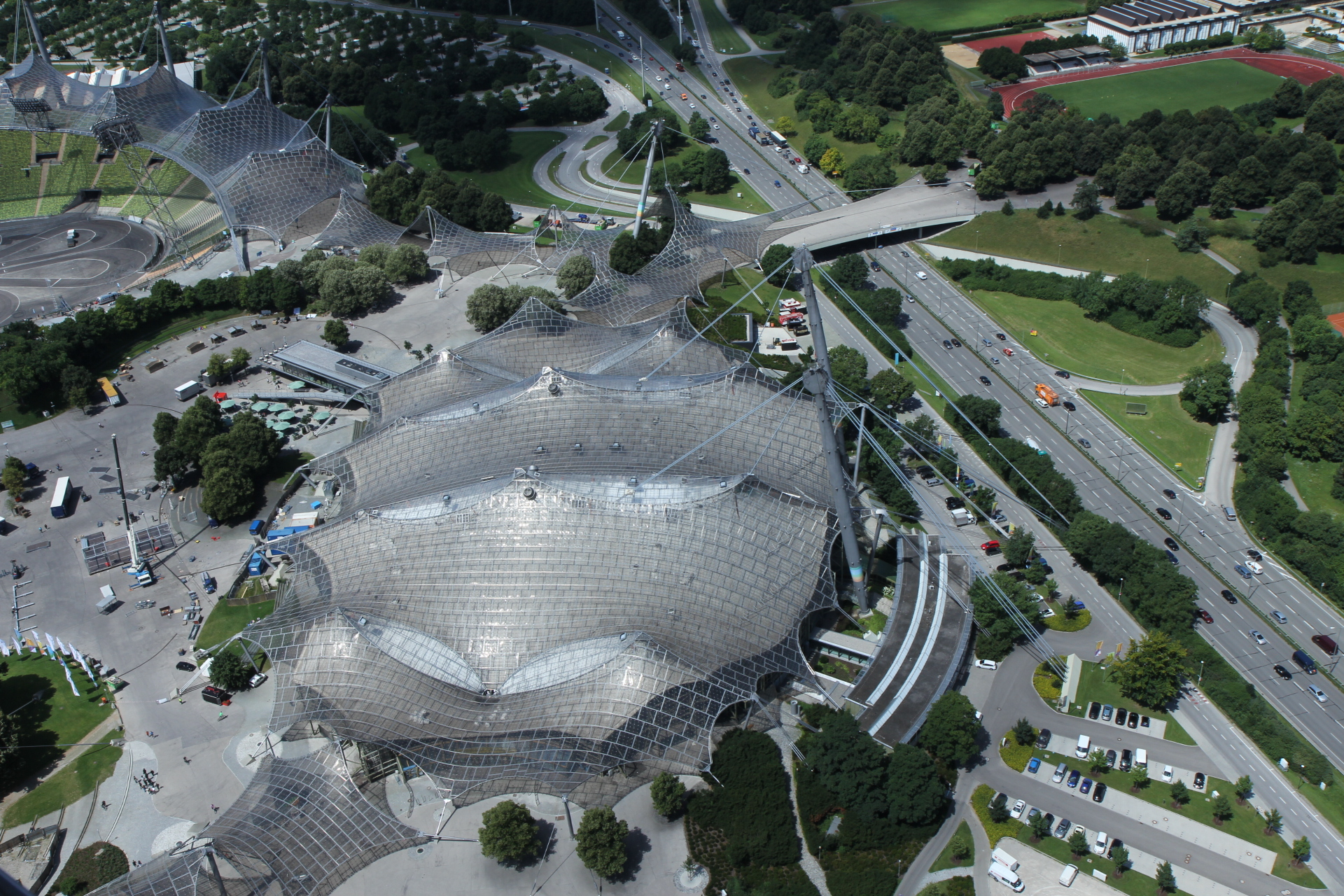
- Interactive map of Olympiahalle
- Full name: Olympiahalle München
- Address: Spiridon-Louis-Ring 21; 80809 Munich, Bayern, Germany
- Location: Olympiapark München
- Coordinates: 48°10′30″N 11°33′00″E
- Owner: Olympiapark München GmbH
- Operator: CTS Eventim
- Capacity: 15,500

Construction
- Groundbreaking: 1967
- Opened: 27 August 1972
- Renovated: 2007–09; 2012; 2020
- Architects: Behnisch & Partner
- Project manager: Bernd Rosewich
- Structural engineer: Hans Korn

Tenant
- EC Hedos München (selected matches) EHC Red Bull München (selected matches) Bayern Munich (selected matches)

Website
- Arena information

The Olympiahalle (English: Olympic Hall) is a multi-purpose indoor arena in Munich, Germany. It is part of Olympiapark and is used for concerts, sporting events, exhibitions and trade fairs. The official seating capacity varies from some 12,500 to 15,500 depending on the event.

== History ==
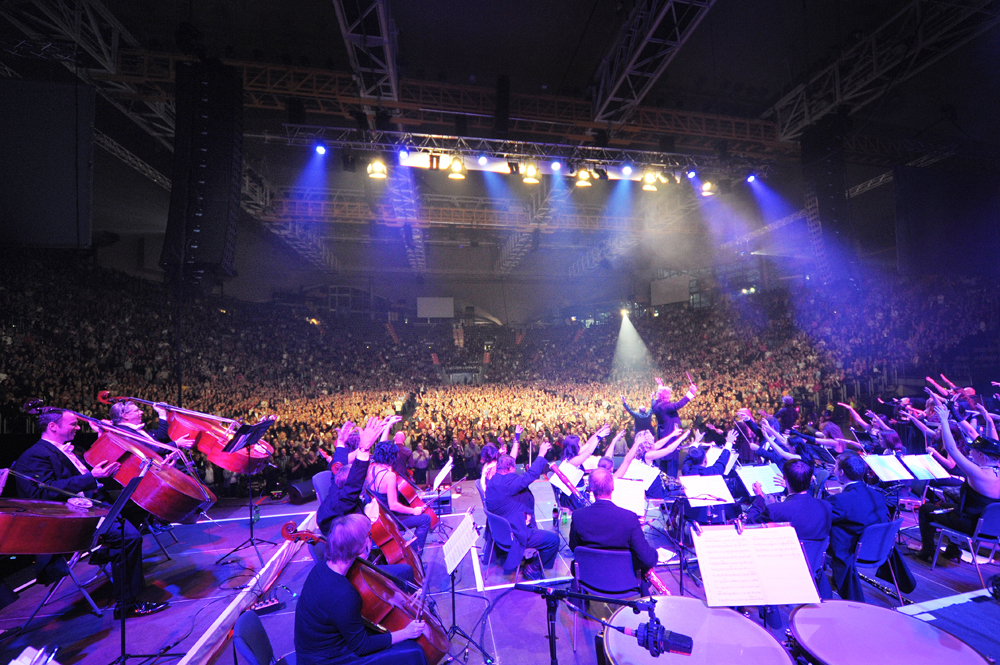
Interior

Olympiahalle opened in 1972 and was the venue for gymnastics and handball events at the 1972 Summer Olympics.

In the past, it served as a part-time home for the defunct ice hockey team EC Hedos München.

The current seating capacity of 15,500 was set after a massive overhaul was completed in 2009. A new VIP area, a restaurant and an underground second arena ("Kleine Olympiahalle") with a capacity of up to 4,000 was integrated in the new complex. The stage area was also rebuilt, which contributed to the increased seating capacity and at the same time allowed faster access for stage crews. By February 2020, the air conditioning, other technology and lighting were modernised, and the original look from 1972 in the hall itself was restored in accordance with the monument. Most of the construction work took place while the hall was in operation.

== Events ==
=== Entertainment ===
| Year | Date | Nationality | Artists | Tours | Opening/Supporting Acts | Attendance | Box office |
|---|---|---|---|---|---|---|---|
| 1973 | 21 January - First ever rock concert at Olympiahalle | United Kingdom | Deep Purple | Who Do We Think We Are Tour | Steppenwolf | | |
| 1974 | 14 September | United States | Grateful Dead | Europe '74 Tour | Ned Lagin | | |
| 1976 | 7 April | United Kingdom | David Bowie | Isolar – 1976 Tour | | | |
| 1976 | 2 December | United States | Santana | Amigos Tour | Journey | | |
| 1977 | 20 October | United Kingdom | Rainbow | Long Live Rock 'N' Roll Tour | Kingfish | 250 | |
| 1978 | 3 May | United Kingdom | Queen | News of the World Tour | | | |
| 1978 | 20 May | United Kingdom | David Bowie | Isolar II – The 1978 World Tour | | | |
| 1978 | 2 December | United States | Santana | European Tour 1978 | Devadip Orchestra | | |
| 1980 | 31 March | United Kingdom | The Who | The Who Tour 1980 | | | |
| 1980 | 5 July | United Kingdom | Led Zeppelin | Tour Over Europe 1980 | | | |
| 1980 | 18 September | United States | Kiss | Unmasked Tour | | | |
| 1980 | 17 December | Australia | AC/DC | Back in Black Tour | | | |
| 1980 | 18 December | United Kingdom | Queen | The Game Tour | | | |
| 1981 | 12 May | United Kingdom | Dire Straits | On Location Tour | | | |
| 1981 | 19 July | United States | Bob Dylan | 1981 World Tour | | | |
| 1981 | 20 July | United States | Bob Dylan | 1981 World Tour | | | |
| 1982 | 21 May | United Kingdom | Queen | Hot Space Tour | | | |
| 1982 | 22 May | United Kingdom | Queen | Hot Space Tour | | | |
| 1982 | 28 November | Australia | AC/DC | For Those About to Rock Tour | —N/a | | |
| 1983 | 21 May | United Kingdom | David Bowie | Serious Moonlight Tour | | | |
| 1983 | 22 May | United Kingdom | David Bowie | Serious Moonlight Tour | | | |
| 1984 | 16 September | United Kingdom | Queen | The Works Tour | | | |
| 1985 | 20 April | United States | Tina Turner | Private Dancer Tour | | | |
| 1986 | 28 June | United Kingdom | Queen | The Magic Tour | Craaft | 11,200/11,200 | |
| 1986 | 29 June | United Kingdom | Queen | The Magic Tour | Craaft | 11,200/11,200 | |
| 1987 | 4, 5 March | United States | Tina Turner | Break Every Rule World Tour | | | |
| 1987 | 14, 15, 16, 18, 19 April | United States | Tina Turner | Break Every Rule World Tour | | | |
| 1989 | 19 May | United Kingdom | The Cure | The Prayer Tour | | | |
| 1990 | 10 April | United Kingdom | David Bowie | Sound+Vision Tour | | | |
| 1990 | 16 October | United States | Janet Jackson | Rhythm Nation World Tour 1990 | | | |
| 1990 | 21 October | United States | Tina Turner | Foreign Affair: The Farewell Tour | | | |
| 1993 | 9 September | United Kingdom | Paul McCartney | The New World Tour | | | |
| 1993 | 22 November | United States | Metallica | Wherever We May Roam Tour | | | |
| 1992 | 12 October | United Kingdom | The Cure | The Wish Tour | | | |
| 1995 | 1 April | United States | Janet Jackson | Janet World Tour | | | |
| 1996 | 30, 31 May | United States | Tina Turner | Wildest Dreams Tour | | | |
| 1996 | 1, 2 June | United States | Tina Turner | Wildest Dreams Tour | | | |
| 1996 | 2, 3, 4, 5, 6, 7 October | United States | Tina Turner | Wildest Dreams Tour | | | |
| 1998 | 26 March | United Kingdom | Spice Girls | Spiceworld Tour | | | |
| 1998 | 1 May | United States | Janet Jackson | The Velvet Rope Tour | | | |
| 1998 | 13 October | United Kingdom | Depeche Mode | The Singles Tour | | | |
| 2000 | 9 April | United Kingdom | The Cure | The Dream Tour | | | |
| 2000 | 26 October | United States | Britney Spears | Oops!... I Did It Again Tour | | | |
| 2002 | 12 April | Ireland | Westlife | World of Our Own Tour | | | |
| 2002 | 2 June | United States | Destiny's Child | Destiny's Child World Tour | Play; Solange Knowles | | |
| 2002 | 3 June | Australia | Kylie Minogue | KylieFever2002 | | | |
| 2002 | 29 September | United Kingdom | David Bowie | Heathen Tour | | | |
| 2003 | 27 October | United Kingdom | David Bowie | A Reality Tour | | | |
| 2004 | 2 March | Canada | Shania Twain | Up! Tour | Björn Againe | | |
| 2004 | 23 March | Canada | Shania Twain | Up! Tour | Björn Againe | | |
| 2004 | 25 May | United States | Britney Spears | Onyx Hotel Tour | | | |
| 2004 | 4 June | United States | Cher | The Farewell Tour | | | |
| 2004 | 26 September | Canada | Avril Lavigne | Bonez Tour | | | |
| 2005 | 31 March | Australia | Kylie Minogue | Showgirl: The Greatest Hits Tour | | | |
| 2005 | 14 April | United Kingdom | Queen + Paul Rodgers | Queen + Paul Rodgers Tour | | | |
| 2007 | 18 & 19 February | Colombia | Shakira | Oral Fixation Tour | | | |
| 2007 | 7 May | United States | Beyoncé | The Beyoncé Experience | Lemar | | |
| 2007 | 26 May | United States | Justin Timberlake | FutureSex/LoveShow | | | |
| 2008 | 25 February | United Kingdom | The Cure | | | | |
| 2008 | 26 September | United Kingdom | Coldplay | Viva la Vida Tour | | —N/a | |
| 2008 | 1 October | United Kingdom | Queen + Paul Rodgers | Rock The Cosmos Tour | | | |
| 2009 | 23, 24, 27, 28 February | United States | Tina Turner | Tina!: 50th Anniversary Tour | | | |
| 2011 | 5 March | Australia | Kylie Minogue | Aphrodite: Les Folies Tour | | | |
| 2011 | 25 October | Barbados | Rihanna | Loud Tour | | | |
| 2012 | 25 October | United States | Jennifer Lopez | Dance Again World Tour | | | |
| 2013 | 5 May | Great Britain | One Direction | Take Me Home Tour | | | |
| 2013 | 22 May | United States | Beyoncé | The Mrs. Carter Show World Tour | Luke James | 11,857 / 11,857 | $981,667 |
| 2014 | 13 November | United States | Linkin Park | The Hunting Party Tour | Of Mice & Men | 15,000 / 15,000 | |
| 2015 | 2 February | United Kingdom | Queen + Adam Lambert | Queen + Adam Lambert Tour 2014-2015 | | | |
| 2015 | 26 March | Argentina | Violetta | Violetta Live | | Unknown | |
| 2015 | 27 March | Argentina | Violetta | Violetta Live | | Unknown | |
| 2015 | 10 June | United States | Maroon 5 | Maroon V Tour | Magic! Nick Gardner; Mike Watson | Unknown | |
| 2016 | 31 March | United Kingdom | Muse | Drones World Tour | De Staat | Unknown | |
| 2016 | 8 June | United States | Chris Brown | One Hell Of a Nite Tour | | | |
| 2016 | 16 September | Canada | Justin Bieber | Purpose World Tour | TBA | | |
| 2016 | 23 September | Canada | Nickelback | Live in Concert | TBA | | |
| 2016 | 12 October | Germany | Schiller | | TBA | | |
| 2016 | 24 October | United Kingdom | The Cure | | TBA | | |
| 2016 | 25 October | Italy | Laura Pausini | | | | |
| 2016 | 29 October | Italy | Zucchero | Live 2016 | TBA | | |
| 2016 | 31 October | Denmark | Volbeat | "Seal The Deal & Let's Boogie" European tour | TBA | | |
| 2016 | 1 November | United States | Red Hot Chili Peppers | The Getaway Tour | TBA | | |
| 2016 | 4 November | United Kingdom | Placebo | | TBA | | |
| 2016 | 12 November | | Jakarta Blues Band | Feel The Groove | TBA | | |
| 2016 | 25 November | United Kingdom | Elton John | Wonderful Crazy Night Tour | TBA | | |
| 2016 | 26 November | | Wasteland | Voodoo Rocks | | | |
| 2016 | 28 November | Germany | Xavier Naidoo | Not of This World Live - Live In Concert | | | |
| 2016 | 30 November | United Kingdom | Status Quo | The Last Night Of The Electrics Tour 2016 | | | |
| 2016 | 2 December | Germany | David Garrett | | | | |
| 2016 | 3 December | | voXXclub | GEILES AZURE Tour 2016 | | | |
| 2016 | 15 December | Germany | Robin Schulz | Arena Tour 2016 | | | |
| 2016 | 19 December | Germany | Böhse Onkelz | 2016 Tour | | | |
| 2016 | 20 December | Germany | Böhse Onkelz | 2016 Tour | | | |
| 2017 | 17 January | Germany | Die Fantastischen Vier | "Vier und Jetzt" Tour | | | |
| 2017 | 21 January | | Time Runner | New Year Party | | | |
| 2017 | 4 February | Germany | Andrea Berg | Live 2016 - 2017 | | | |
| 2017 | 18 February | Austria | Rainhard Fendrich | SCHWARZODERWEISS Tour 2017 | | | |
| 2017 | 7 March | Italy | Ennio Morricone | 60 Years of Music Tour | | | |
| 2017 | 11 March | | Ina Müller & Band | | | | |
| 2017 | 24 March | Germany | Sarah Connor | Native - Live 2017 | | | |
| 2017 | 31 May | United Kingdom | Little Mix | The Glory Days Tour | The Vamps | | |
| 2017 | 2 November | United Kingdom | Queen + Adam Lambert | Queen + Adam Lambert Tour 2017-2018 | | | |
| 2018 | 15 March | Spain | Enrique Iglesias | Enrique Iglesias Live | | | |
| 2018 | 25 March | Argentina | Soy Luna | Soy Luna Live | | Unknown | |
| 2018 | 26 April | United States | Metallica | WorldWired Tour | | | |
| 2018 | 13 June | United Kingdom | Roger Waters | Us + Them | | | |
| 2018 | 17 June | Colombia | Shakira | El Dorado World Tour | Salva | TBA | TBA |
| 2018 | 5 October | Canada | Shania Twain | Shania Now Tour | | | |
| 2019 | 21 March | Canada | Shawn Mendes | Shawn Mendes: The Tour | Alessia Cara | 11,257 / 11,257 | $790,944 |
| 2019 | 3 October | United States | Cher | Here We Go Again Tour | Bright Light Bright Light | 10,218 / 10,218 | $1,197,300 |
| 2020 | 19 January | Sweden | Sabaton | The Great Tour 2020 | Amaranthe, apocalyptica | | |
| 2020 | 31 May | United Kingdom | Eric Clapton | Summer European Tour 2020 | TBA | TBA | TBA |
| 2022 | 22 May | United Kingdom | Dua Lipa | Future Nostalgia Tour | Griff | 13,343 / 13,343 | $717,595 |
| 2022 | 29 June | United Kingdom | Queen + Adam Lambert | The Rhapsody Tour | | 11,275 / 11,275 | |
| 2022 | 11 July | United Kingdom | Harry Styles | Love On Tour | Wolf Alice | 13,027 / 13,027 | $991,358 |
| 2023 | 24 October | United States | 50 Cent | The Final Lap Tour | Busta Rhymes | | |
| 2024 | 23 March | Canada | Celine Dion | Courage World Tour | TBA | TBA | TBA |
| 2024 | 3 June | United States | Jonas Brothers | Five Albums. One Night. The World Tour | | | |
| 2024 | 7 June | United States | Olivia Rodrigo | Guts World Tour | Remi Wolf | 12,390 / 12,390 | $1,383,068 |
| 2024 | 21 August | United States | Justin Timberlake | The Forget Tomorrow World Tour | | | |
| 2024 | 22 August | United States | Justin Timberlake | The Forget Tomorrow World Tour | | | |
| 2024 | 5 October | United States | Janet Jackson | Janet Jackson: Together Again | Wyclef Jean | TBA | TBA |
| 2024 | 19 October | Bosnia and Herzegovina | Dino Merlin | "Mi" World Tour | | TBA | TBA |
| 2025 | 3 December | United Kingdom | Ed Sheeran | Loop Tour | | | |
| 2026 | 16 April | Australia | Tame Impala | Deadbeat Tour | RIP Magic | | |
| 2026 | 27 April | Australia | 5 Seconds of Summer | Everyone's a Star! World Tour | South Arcade, Master Peace | | |

The 1977 concert of Rainbow has been released as Live in Munich 1977 in 2006.

=== Sports ===
Olympiahalle also plays hosts to the annual Six Days of Munich, an international track cycling competition and the former Grand Slam Cup tennis tournament. Several other major international events were held in this venue, including the 1974 and the 1991 World Figure Skating Championships and the 1975 preliminaries of the Ice Hockey World Championships and the 1983, 1993 IIHF Ice Hockey World Championships finals.

Important basketball events that were held in Olympiahalle include the Final phase of the 1993 European Basketball Championships, the 1989 and 1999 Euroleague Final Fours.

World Wrestling Entertainment has hosted several house shows in the Olympiahalle since 1992 and most recently on 27 September 2008.

== See also ==
- List of indoor arenas in Germany

| Preceded by Samsung Arena, Bratislava; Halifax Metro Centre, Halifax | World Figure Skating Championships; Venue; 1974; 1991 | Succeeded by Broadmoor World Arena, Colorado Springs; Oakland–Alameda County Coliseum Arena, Oakland |
| Preceded by Spodek; Katowice | European Indoor Championships in Athletics; Venue; 1976 | Succeeded by Velódromo de Anoeta; San Sebastián |
| Preceded by Scandinavium; Gothenburg | Davis Cup; Final Venue; 1985 | Succeeded by Kooyong Stadium; Melbourne |
| Preceded by Unknown venue, Helsinki; Malá Sportovní Hala, Prague | Ice Hockey World Championships; Final Venue; 1983; 1993 | Succeeded by Sportovní hala, Prague; Forum di Assago, Milan |
| Preceded by Flanders Expo; Ghent | FIBA European Champions Cup; Final Four; Venue; 1989 | Succeeded by Pabellón Príncipe Felipe; Zaragoza |
| Preceded by PalaEur; Rome | FIBA EuroBasket; Final Venue; 1993 | Succeeded by Olympic Indoor Hall; Athens |
| Preceded by Palau Sant Jordi; Barcelona | FIBA Euroleague; Final Four; Venue; 1999 | Succeeded by PAOK Sports Arena; Thessaloníki |
| Preceded by Madison Square Garden | WTA Tour Championships; Final Venue; 2001 | Succeeded by Staples Center |
