= Rock or Bust (song) =

2014 single by AC/DC

Single by AC/DC

from the album Rock or Bust
- B-side: "Play Ball"
- Released: 17 November 2014
- Recorded: May – July 2014
- Studio: The Warehouse (Vancouver)
- Genre: Hard rock
- Length: 3:03
- Label: Albert; Columbia
- Songwriters: Angus Young; Malcolm Young
- Producer: Brendan O'Brien

AC/DC singles chronology
"Play Ball" (2014)	"Rock or Bust" (2014)	"Rock the Blues Away" (2015)

Music video
- "Rock or Bust" on YouTube

"Rock or Bust" is the second single and first track from the album of the same name by Australian hard rock band AC/DC. It was written by Angus Young and Malcolm Young. It was released for downloads on 17 November 2014, as a follow-up for the band's first officially released single from the album titled "Play Ball".

AC/DC drummer Phil Rudd was absent from the video shoot for the single, and was replaced by Welshman Bob Richards, who had previously played with Man, Adrian Smith, Asia and Shogun.

The song was shortlisted for Song of the Year at the APRA Music Awards of 2015.

== Charts ==
Chart (2014)	Peak position
Austria (Ö3 Austria Top 40)	66
Belgium (Ultratip Bubbling Under Flanders)	55
Belgium (Ultratip Bubbling Under Wallonia)	28
France (SNEP)	42
Germany (GfK)	47
Italy (FIMI)	70
Switzerland (Schweizer Hitparade)	55
US Hot Rock & Alternative Songs (Billboard)	29
US Rock & Alternative Airplay (Billboard)	28
US Mainstream Rock (Billboard)	8

== Certifications ==
Region	Certification	Certified units/sales
Brazil (Pro-Música Brasil)	Gold	30,000^{‡}
Canada (Music Canada)	Gold	40,000^{‡}
^{‡} Sales+streaming figures based on certification alone.
