= Starfighters (band) =

English hard rock band

Starfighters are an English heavy metal band from the new wave of British heavy metal movement founded in Birmingham in 1980. They attracted a strong British cult following but were not able to translate this into any lasting success, producing just two full studio albums in the early 1980s. Ex-member Stevie Young brought in some attention to the group after he joined the hard rock band AC/DC in 2014. (Stevie Young is the nephew of AC/DC leaders Malcolm and Angus Young).

== Biography ==
Initially called Savage (named after the original lead vocalist, Phil Savage), the founding members, Stevie Young and Barry Spencer Scrannage changed the band's name to Starfighters and released the single, "Heaven and Hell" (A-side) and "I'm Falling" (B-side), on the independent record label, Motor City Rhythm Records. A further two singles were recorded and produced in 1980, but were never released. This line-up consisted of Steve Burton (vocals), Pat Hambly (guitar) Stevie Young (guitar), Doug Dennis (bass) and Barry Spencer Scrannage (drums, born 1954 in Smethwick and formerly in Glenn Tipton's pre Judas Priest band Shave 'Em Dry). They were then signed up by Jive Records (a part of Zomba).

They then won a support slot with AC/DC on their 1980 'Back in Black' tour, during which, Barry Spencer Scrannage left following the death of close personal friend, John Bonham, his position was later filled by Steve Bailey. Signing up with Krokus manager Butch Stone, in 1983 they released the follow-up album, In-Flight Movie, again produced by Tony Platt. Jive however were not prepared to pay for further tour promotions, and the band resorted to appearing in small British clubs. Despite receiving good reviews and publicity, particularly in Kerrang! magazine, this album did no better and Jive dropped them. The band consequently folded.

In 1987, the band reformed with the line-up of Burton (vocals), Young (guitars), Rik Sandford (guitars), Redvers (bass) and Jamie Hawkins (drums). Redvers had been known as Steve Hill up to this point, but was rechristened with his middle name, to avoid the confusion of having three 'Steves' in the band. Despite attracting a strong local following in Birmingham, they could not secure another recording contract, and the band folded after little more than a year. Sandford and Hawkins had very brief stints with UFO and Hawkwind respectively. Redvers became Steve Redvers and joined The Grip, before linking up with Young and Ian Charles (Chaz) in Little Big Horn.

Starfighters reformed again for a one off show on 10 November 2006 at 'The Roadhouse' in South Birmingham to raise money for charity, with the line-up of Burton (vocals), Young (guitars and vocals), Hambly (guitars), Dennis (bass and vocals) and Tony Bayliss (drums).

Scrannage played with Ozzy Osbourne and stayed at Osbourne's house in 1979, was briefly in the band Bullion with original Judas Priest members Ernie Chataway and Bruno Stapenhill and, as of 2008, worked as an actor and used to run the Rock Tavern in Hill Street, Brierley Hill.

When bassist Doug Dennis died in 2011, the remaining Starfighters reformed to play at his wake with Stevie Young's son Angus on bass.

In May 2014, Stevie Young replaced his uncle Malcolm Young for the recording of a new AC/DC album and tour, and has since remained with AC/DC during their hiatus and 2020 comeback album, Power Up and the Power Up Tour.

As of June 2021, Burton is fronting the Birmingham blues band, Vincent Flatts Final Drive. They have released their fourth CD, Back In The Saddle.

== Discography ==
- Starfighters (1981) - Jive Records
- In-Flight Movie (1983) - Jive Records
