= Stabler Arena =

Multi-purpose building in Bethlehem, Pennsylvania

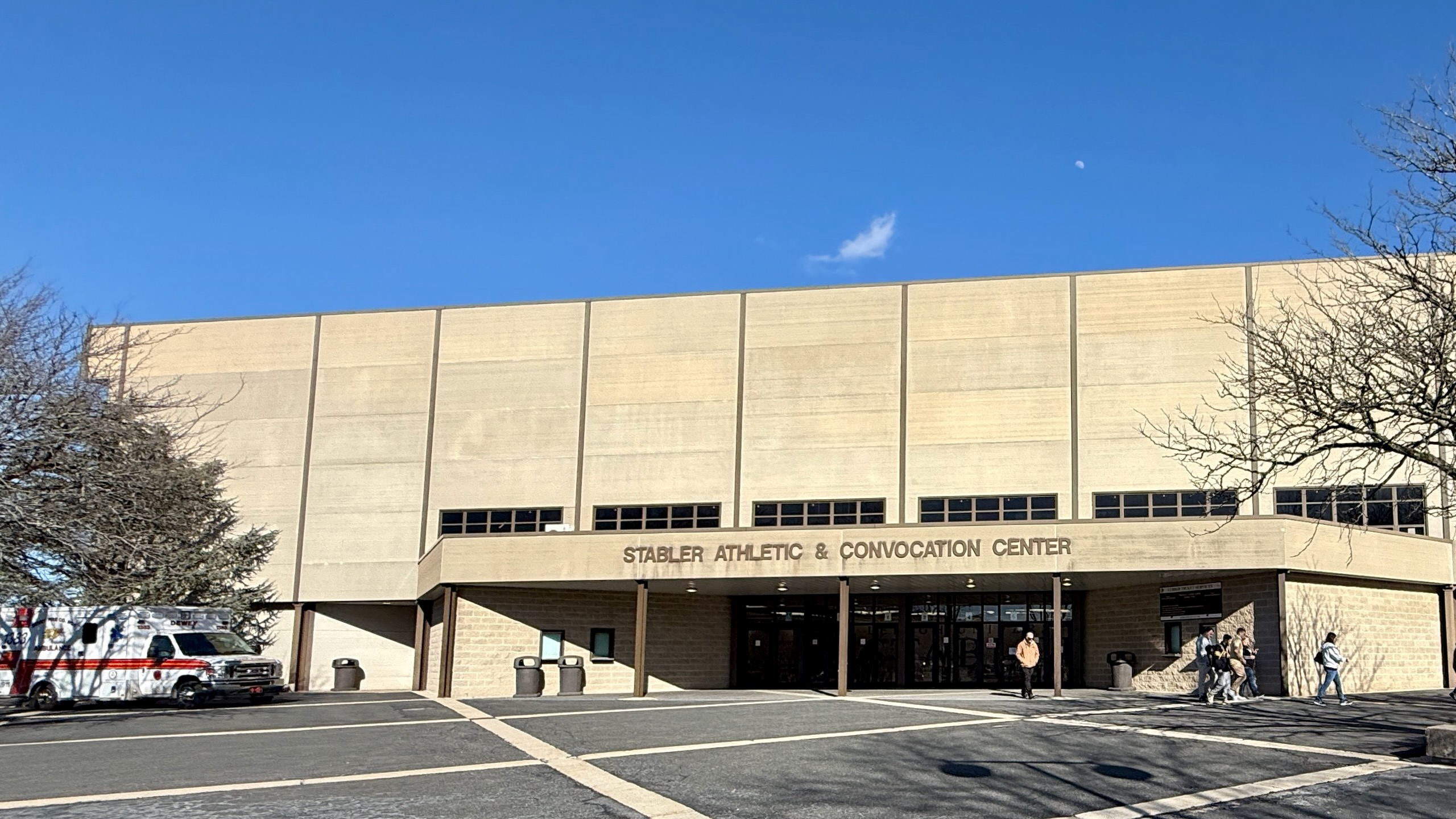
- Stabler Athletic & Convocation Center
- Interactive map of Stabler Arena
- Location: 124 Goodman Drive; Bethlehem, Pennsylvania 18015
- Coordinates: 40°35′7″N 75°21′27″W
- Owner: Lehigh University
- Operator: Lehigh University
- Capacity: Concerts: 6,200 Basketball: 5,600

Construction
- Opened: May 29, 1979

Tenants
- Lehigh Mountain Hawks (NCAA) (1979–present); Pennsylvania ValleyDawgs (USBL) (1999–2003); Lehigh Valley Outlawz (GLIFL/CIFL) (2006–2008); Lehigh Valley Steelhawks (IFL/PIFL) (2011–2014)

Stabler Arena is a 6,200-seat multi-purpose arena in Bethlehem, Pennsylvania, in the Lehigh Valley region of the state. Owned and operated by Lehigh University, it is located on the school's Goodman Campus.

Stabler Arena is named after Donald B. Stabler, a 1930 Lehigh graduate, founder of Stabler Companies Inc., and a member of the university's Board of Trustees for over 30 years. He and his wife, Dorothy, were the primary donors who funded the arena’s construction.

The arena officially opened with Lehigh's Commencement Exercises on May 29, 1979, replacing Taylor Gymnasium, which had hosted Lehigh athletics since 1914. Its first public event was Holiday on Ice in November later that same year.

== Athletics ==
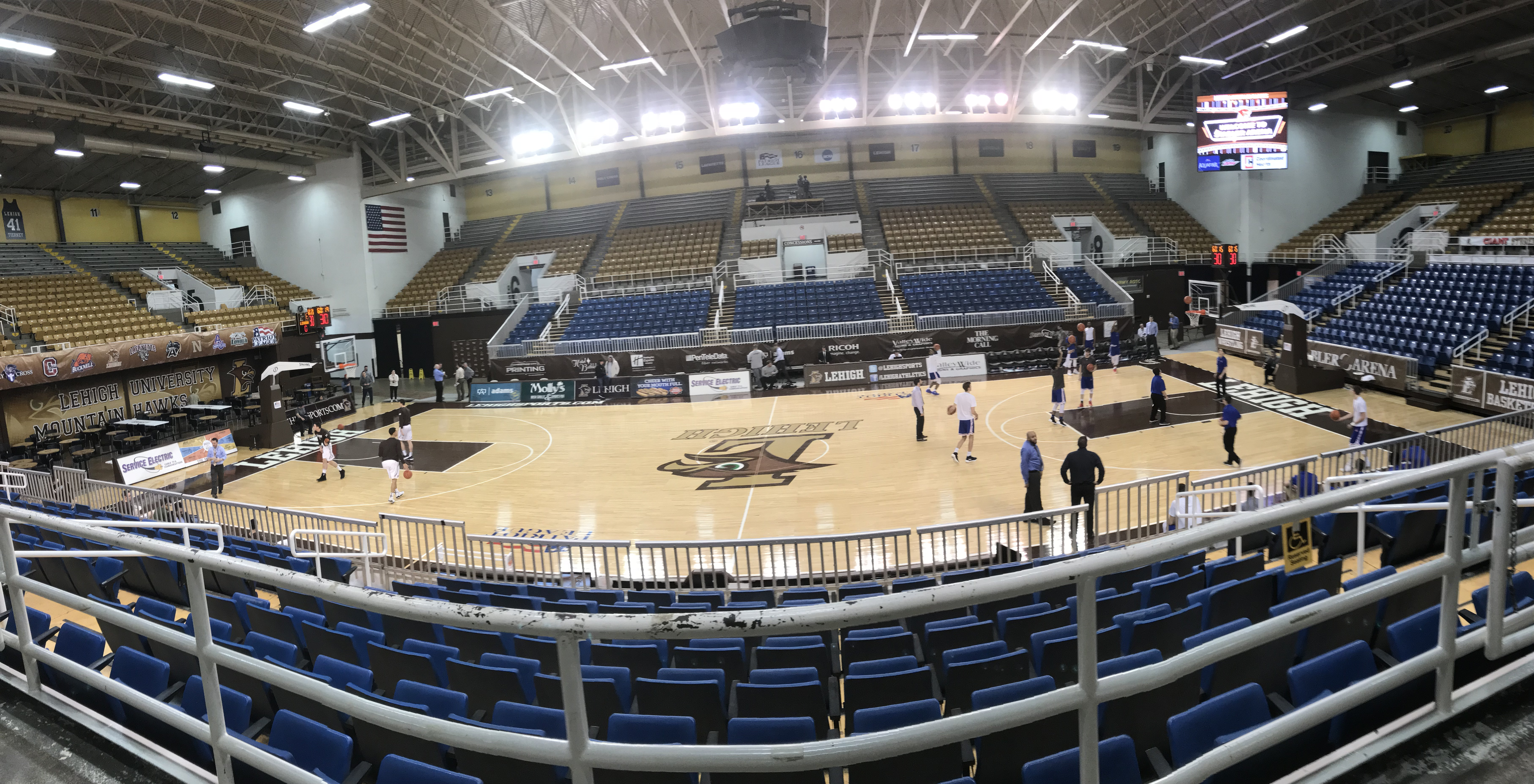
Stabler Arena

Stabler Arena is home to the Lehigh University Mountain Hawks basketball teams, who play in the NCAA Division I Patriot League. Stabler was also home to two indoor football teams, the Lehigh Valley Outlawz and the Lehigh Valley Steelhawks and the Pennsylvania ValleyDawgs basketball team.

Stabler also has hosted ABC's Wide World of Sports and the U.S. Women's gymnastics finals.

== Concerts ==
Because of the arena's reputation for exceptional acoustics and lively audiences, some musical acts have started their U.S. tours at Stabler Arena, including The Cranberries, Grateful Dead, Judas Priest, Kiss, Bette Midler, and The Moody Blues.

Notable Stabler Arena concerts have included:

- October 7, 1980: AC/DC on their Back in Black Tour.
- September 25, 1981: Grateful Dead.
- December 27, 1982: Billy Joel on his tour supporting The Nylon Curtain album. This appearance was notable as Joel's song "Allentown" was a big hit at that time, and Stabler Arena was the largest venue in the Lehigh Valley.
- October 21, 1987: Whitney Houston; the music video for her 1987 single "So Emotional" was filmed during the concert.
- September 26, 1990: MC Hammer performed as part of his Please Hammer Don't Hurt 'Em World Tour.
- December 31, 1992: Bon Jovi played a pre-tour show specially done for the filming of their videos Bed of Roses and In These Arms of their Keep The Faith album.
- November 9, 1993: Nirvana, in one of lead singer's Kurt Cobain's final performances prior to his suicide five months later, on April 5, 1994. .Various WWE Live & televised events . Aug 4/1997 WWE Raw Live Tapings.
- February 11, 2007: Breaking Benjamin filmed their entire concert there, which was released in April 2007 in the collectors edition CD and DVD that accompanied release of Phobia, the band's album.

== Renovations and upgrades ==
In the fall of 2016, brand new LED video boards measuring 10 feet (3.0 m) tall and 17 feet (5.2 m) wide were installed in two corners of the arena. A new LED scorer's table was added, along with two new competition baskets with three-sided shot clocks, and two fixed digit scoreboards were installed in time for the start of the 2016-17 basketball season. The arena also debuted a new baseline club, a court-level area behind one of the baskets that features high-top tables.

In the summer of 2017, the arena received a new basketball floor.

== See also ==
- List of NCAA Division I basketball arenas
