= Rock or Bust =

2014 studio album by AC/DC

Studio album by AC/DC
- Released: 28 November 2014
- Recorded: May–July 2014
- Studio: The Warehouse (Vancouver)
- Genre: Hard rock
- Length: 34:55
- Label: Columbia
- Producer: Brendan O'Brien

AC/DC chronology
Live at River Plate (2012)	Rock or Bust (2014)	Power Up (2020)

Singles from Rock or Bust
- 1. "Play Ball" Released: 7 October 2014; 2. "Rock or Bust" Released: 17 November 2014; 3. "Rock the Blues Away" Released: 10 March 2015

Rock or Bust is the sixteenth studio album by the Australian rock band AC/DC, released on 28 November 2014. Rock or Bust is the group's first album to feature rhythm guitarist Stevie Young, replacing founding member Malcolm Young, who had retired from the band earlier in the year due to health concerns and would pass away three years later. At approximately 35 minutes, it surpassed 1983's Flick of the Switch as the band's shortest album to date. It sold 2.8 million copies worldwide.

The group released the debut single from the album, titled "Play Ball", on 7 October 2014. The song has been a commercial success, reaching the top 40 charts in various countries such as Spain (at number 28), France (at number 39) or Switzerland (at number 19). Rock or Bust peaked at number 1 in 12 countries, including Australia, Canada, Germany and Sweden. It reached the top 5 in a further 12 countries, including New Zealand, the United Kingdom, the United States and Italy. The album earned AC/DC a 2015 ECHO Award for Rock/Alternative (International).

Drummer Phil Rudd was unable to participate in the supporting tour following legal problems and was replaced by Chris Slade. Lead vocalist Brian Johnson was forced to leave the band during the tour due to hearing loss, with Guns N' Roses lead vocalist Axl Rose filling in for the 2016 dates. Bassist Cliff Williams retired from the band upon the tour's conclusion. All three members have since returned to the band.

== Overview ==
Released on 28 November 2014 in Australia and New Zealand and 2 December 2014 elsewhere, Rock or Bust marks the band's first album since 2010's Iron Man 2 and first album of original material since 2008's Black Ice.

Rock or Bust is the band's first album without founding member and rhythm guitarist Malcolm Young, who left the band in 2014 for health reasons. Malcolm's departure was later clarified by the band and their management, who stated that he was officially diagnosed with dementia. While Malcolm has writing credits for every track on the album, all of his guitar parts were recorded by his nephew Stevie Young. He died on 18 November 2017, weeks after his older brother George Young.

Before the album was officially announced, Brian Johnson admitted that it was difficult to make the album without Malcolm. He brought about the idea that the album could be called Man Down, but believed the title might be too negative towards Malcolm's situation and overall health.

On 6 November 2014, drummer Phil Rudd was arrested for attempting to procure the murder of two men. AC/DC made a statement the same day: "We've only become aware of Phil's arrest as the news was breaking. We have no further comment. Phil's absence will not affect the release of our new album Rock or Bust and upcoming tour next year." It was not yet clear whether Rudd would remain with the band or not, or who might be his replacement. The attempted procurement charge against Rudd was dropped the following day; charges of possession of methamphetamine and possession of cannabis and a charge of threatening to kill remained.

== Recording ==
The album was recorded at Warehouse Studio in Vancouver, Canada, with producer Brendan O'Brien and mixer Mike Fraser. When Rudd was ten days late for the recording sessions, O'Brien was ready to replace him with another drummer, but Rudd arrived and recorded his parts.

By Angus Young's reckoning, recording took, "about four weeks. We had all the material – we were well prepared to do the album and that helped a lot. We'd done a lot of the work before going in the studio. Brendan is a very accomplished musician, so that's part of why we work with him. He knows all his instruments."

The songs were constructed largely by Angus Young from material accumulated by the brothers during the recording of previous albums.

On some lead tracks, Angus Young used the Schaffer Replica, a device that emulates the Schaffer-Vega Diversity System. The device was donated to him by AC/DC fan Fil "SoloDallas" Olivieri.

== Release and promotion ==
Josh Cheuse of the Arcade Creative Group handled the art direction, and decided to add more features to the physical edition, considering that "If you don’t make something special, there’s no point in even making any packaging at all.” Thus the cover is a lenticular, and the booklet has 24 pictures featuring the band. The agency Curb did a special video to promote the album in a Polish quarry, where a rock exploded to reveal a carved AC/DC logo.

The first single "Play Ball" was first used on 27 September 2014 in a trailer for Major League Baseball on TBS postseason coverage, and the single was released on 7 October, the same day as the track listing and artwork were revealed. It became available on iTunes for those who pre-ordered the album. The second single is "Rock or Bust", the official video for which was filmed in front of 500 fans in London on 4 October 2014. The single was released on 17 November 2014. The song leaked by accident when it was uploaded to the AC/DC YouTube account instead of "Play Ball". Rudd was absent from both video shoots for the singles, and was replaced by Welshman Bob Richards, who had previously played with Man, Adrian Smith, Asia and Shogun.

=== Tour ===
In 2015, the band embarked on a world tour to promote Rock or Bust and celebrate the band's 40th anniversary. Malcolm was replaced by his and Angus's nephew, Stevie Young. At first, it was not yet clear whether Rudd would participate in the tour. On 6 January 2015, it was announced that AC/DC would be headlining at the Coachella Valley Music and Arts Festival, performing on 10 and 17 April 2015. Chris Slade, who played with AC/DC between 1989 and 1994, was announced as the drummer for the tour. Four songs from the LP were played live on the tour: "Rock or Bust", "Play Ball", "Got Some Rock & Roll Thunder", & "Baptism by Fire".

== Reception ==
=== Critical reception ===
Professional ratings
Aggregate scores
Source	Rating
Metacritic	75/100
Review scores
Source	Rating
AllMusic	4/5 stars
The Daily Telegraph	3/5 stars
The Guardian	3/5 stars
Kerrang!	4/5 stars
NME	7/10
The Observer	4/5 stars
PopMatters	7/10
Q	4/5 stars
Rolling Stone	3.5/5 stars
USA Today	2.5/4 stars

The album received generally favourable and warm reviews; it garnered a score of 75 on the website Metacritic, based on 22 reviews. In particular, the magazine Trucking published a praising review by Andy Stewart in which he wrote, "Short, but definitely sweet, this long-awaited new album from Australia’s biggest band contains a raft of excellent riffs, signature screeching and rock ’n roll boogie-woogie rhythms that are all but impossible not to tap your feet along to." As well, Charles Pitter of PopMatters commented that the album had "a keen focus on catchy choruses and riffs for those who are inclined to practice righteous, gnarly air guitar."

=== Commercial performance ===
Upon its release, Rock or Bust became the sixth most pre-ordered studio album of 2014 on Amazon UK.

In the US, the album sold 172,000 copies in its first week of release and debuted at No. 3 on the Billboard 200. As of January 2015, it has sold 500,000 copies in the US leading to a Gold certification by the RIAA, the band's 22nd album to reach such status. In Canada, it debuted at No. 1 on the Canadian Albums Chart, selling 31,000 copies in its first week of release.

Worldwide, Rock or Bust sold a total of 2.8 million copies in 2014.

=== Accolades ===
In 2015, the album won a Planet Rock award for Best International Album.

Also in 2015, it earned AC/DC Echo Award nominations for Album of the Year and Best Rock/Alternative International Group. It lost the former to Helene Fischer's Farbenspiel, but won the latter.

It was nominated at the ARIA Music Awards of 2015 for Best Group, but lost to Tame Impala for Currents.

== Track listing ==
All tracks are written by Angus Young and Malcolm Young.

No.	Title	Length
1.	"Rock or Bust"	3:03
2.	"Play Ball"	2:47
3.	"Rock the Blues Away"	3:24
4.	"Miss Adventure"	2:57
5.	"Dogs of War"	3:35
6.	"Got Some Rock & Roll Thunder"	3:22
7.	"Hard Times"	2:44
8.	"Baptism by Fire"	3:30
9.	"Rock the House"	2:42
10.	"Sweet Candy"	3:09
11.	"Emission Control"	3:41
Total length:		34:54

== Personnel ==
Personnel taken from Rock or Bust CD booklet, except where noted.

AC/DC

- Angus Young – lead guitar
- Brian Johnson – lead vocals
- Cliff Williams – bass guitar, backing vocals
- Phil Rudd – drums
- Stevie Young – rhythm guitar, backing vocals

Production

- Brendan O'Brien – producer, backing vocals
- Mike Fraser – engineer
- Billy Bowers – additional engineer
- Tom Syrowski – additional engineer
- Richard Jones – equipment technician
- Geoff Banks – equipment technician
- Rick St. Pierre – equipment technician
- Ryan Smith – mastering

Artwork

- Josh Cheuse – art direction, additional photography
- James Minchin III – photography
- Istvan – cover art
- Guido Karp – additional photography

== Charts ==
=== Weekly charts ===
Chart (2014–2015)	Peak position
Australian Albums (ARIA)	1
Austrian Albums (Ö3 Austria)	1
Belgian Albums (Ultratop Flanders)	1
Belgian Albums (Ultratop Wallonia)	1
Canadian Albums (Billboard)	1
Czech Albums (ČNS IFPI)	3
Danish Albums (Hitlisten)	1
Dutch Albums (Album Top 100)	4
Finnish Albums (Suomen virallinen lista)	1
French Albums (SNEP)	1
German Albums (Offizielle Top 100)	1
Greek Albums (IFPI)	20
Hungarian Albums (MAHASZ)	5
Irish Albums (IRMA)	6
Italian Albums (FIMI)	3
Japanese Albums (Oricon)	2
New Zealand Albums (RMNZ)	2
Norwegian Albums (VG-lista)	1
Polish Albums (ZPAV)	2
Portuguese Albums (AFP)	8
Scottish Albums (Official Charts)	1
Spanish Albums (Promusicae)	2
Swedish Albums (Sverigetopplistan)	1
Swiss Albums (Schweizer Hitparade)	1
UK Albums (Official Charts)	3
UK Album Downloads (Official Charts)	2
UK Rock & Metal Albums (Official Charts)	1
US Billboard 200	3
US Top Rock Albums (Billboard)	1

=== Year-end charts ===
Chart (2014)	Position
Australian Albums (ARIA)	13
Austrian Albums (Ö3 Austria)	6
Belgian Albums (Ultratop Flanders)	41
Belgian Albums (Ultratop Wallonia)	40
Dutch Albums (Album Top 100)	63
Finnish Albums (Suomen virallinen lista)	1
French Albums (SNEP)	11
German Albums (Offizielle Top 100)	2
Italian Albums (FIMI)	21
New Zealand Albums (RMNZ)	43
Polish Albums (ZPAV)	16
Spanish Albums (PROMUSICAE)	19
Swedish Albums (Sverigetopplistan)	16
Swiss Albums (Schweizer Hitparade)	4
UK Albums (OCC)	25

Chart (2015)	Position
Australian Albums (ARIA)	40
Austrian Albums (Ö3 Austria)	23
Belgian Albums (Ultratop Flanders)	8
Belgian Albums (Ultratop Wallonia)	21
Canadian Albums (Billboard)	10
Dutch Albums (Album Top 100)	81
French Albums (SNEP)	46
German Albums (Offizielle Top 100)	17
Hungarian Albums (MAHASZ)	70
Italian Albums (FIMI)	54
Spanish Albums (PROMUSICAE)	17
Swedish Albums (Sverigetopplistan)	66
Swiss Albums (Schweizer Hitparade)	2
US Billboard 200	46
US Top Rock Albums (Billboard)	4

=== Decade-end charts ===
Chart (2010–2019)	Position
German Albums (Offizielle Top 100)	15

== Certifications ==
Region	Certification	Certified units/sales
Australia (ARIA)	Platinum	70,000^{^}
Austria (IFPI Austria)	2× Platinum	30,000^{*}
Belgium (BRMA)	Gold	15,000^{*}
Brazil (Pro-Música Brasil)	Platinum	40,000^{‡}
Canada (Music Canada)	Platinum	80,000^{^}
Denmark (IFPI Danmark)	Gold	10,000^{^}
Finland (Musiikkituottajat)	Gold	12,080
France (SNEP)	3× Platinum	300,000^{*}
Germany (BVMI)	3× Platinum	600,000^{‡}
Hungary (MAHASZ)	Platinum	2,000^{^}
Italy (FIMI)	Platinum	50,000^{*}
New Zealand (RMNZ)	Gold	7,500^{^}
Poland (ZPAV)	Platinum	20,000^{‡}
Spain (Promusicae)	Platinum	40,000^{^}
Sweden (GLF)	Platinum	40,000^{‡}
Switzerland (IFPI Switzerland)	Platinum	20,000^{^}
United Kingdom (BPI)	Platinum	300,000^{‡}
United States (RIAA)	Gold	500,000^{^}
Summaries
Europe (IFPI)	Platinum	1,000,000^{*}
^{*} Sales figures based on certification alone.^{^} Shipments figures based on certification alone.^{‡} Sales+streaming figures based on certification alone.
