= Highway to Hell Tour =

1979–1980 concert tour by AC/DC

- Tour by AC/DC
- Poster to the concert in Oakland, USA
- Location: Europe; North America
- Associated album: Highway to Hell
- Start date: 17 August 1979
- End date: 27 January 1980
- Legs: 3
- No. of shows: 99

AC/DC concert chronology
- If You Want Blood Tour (1978–1979); Highway to Hell Tour (1979–1980); Back in Black Tour (1980–1981)

The Highway to Hell Tour was a concert tour by the Australian rock band AC/DC in support of the group's seventh studio album, Highway to Hell, which was released on 27 July 1979. The tour had 3 legs around Europe and North America lasting 5 months starting on 17 August 1979 at Haffmans Park in Bilzen, Belgium, and concluded on 27 January 1980 at Southampton, England. This was the last tour with Bon Scott, who died due to alcohol poisoning, three weeks after the Southampton show, which therefore cancelled the Japan and Australian legs of the tour.

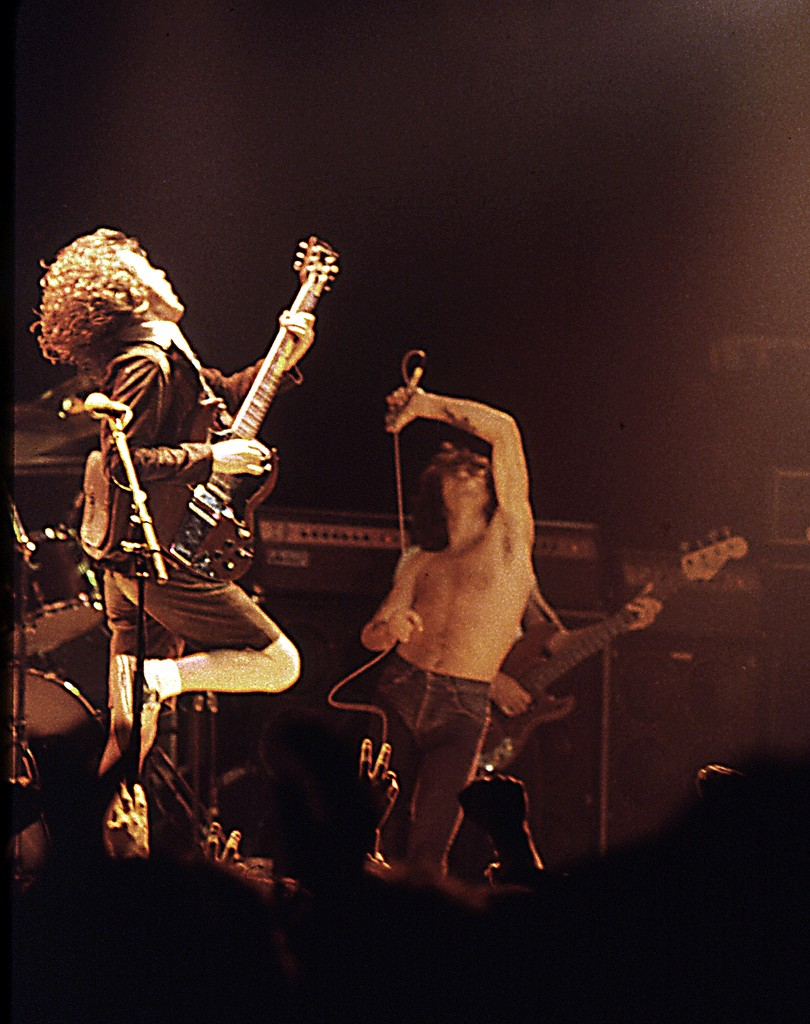
Angus Young (left) and Bon Scott (right) performing at Ulster Hall in Belfast

== Background ==
During the band's tour in the United States, the band attracted capacity crowds, with one venue having to turn away over two thousand fans after being sold out minutes after the box office opened. The band were set to tour in Japan and Australia in early 1980, but the legs were cancelled following the death of vocalist Bon Scott as a result of a combination overdose of drugs and alcohol.

Def Leppard was the opening act for part of the European leg after they were approached by Peter Mensch of Leber-Krebs management, who had booked them on a tour of the UK supporting the band. During the shows in Texas in the United States, Riot and Molly Hatchet were the opening acts for the band on their North American leg.

== Tour dates ==
List of 1979 concerts, showing date, city country and venue
Date	City	Country	Venue
17 August 1979 (Note: This show on 17 August 1979 was a part of Jazz Bilzen.)	Bilzen	Belgium	Haffmans Park
18 August 1979 (Note: This show on 18 August 1979 was an opening act for The Who's 1979 tour.)	London	England	Wembley Stadium
20 August 1979	Dublin	Ireland	Olympic Ballroom
21 August 1979	Dublin	Ireland	Olympic Ballroom
23 August 1979	Belfast	Northern Ireland	Ulster Hall
24 August 1979	Belfast	Northern Ireland	Ulster Hall
27 August 1979	Aix-les-Bains	France	Verdure Theatre
1 September 1979 (Note: This show on 1 September 1979 was a part of the Open Air Festival.)	Nuremberg	West Germany	Zeppelinfeld
5 September 1979	Oakland	United States	Oakland Civic Auditorium
6 September 1979	Reno	United States	UNR Gym
7 September 1979	Santa Cruz	United States	Santa Cruz Civic Auditorium
8 September 1979	Fresno	United States	Warnors Theatre
9 September 1979	San Diego	United States	San Diego Sports Arena
10 September 1979	Long Beach	United States	Long Beach Arena
13 September 1979	Amarillo	United States	Amarillo Civic Center
14 September 1979	Lubbock	United States	Lubbock Municipal Auditorium
15 September 1979	Midland	United States	Chaparral Center
16 September 1979	El Paso	United States	El Paso County Coliseum
18 September 1979	McAllen	United States	La Villa Real Convention Center
19 September 1979	Corpus Christi	United States	Memorial Coliseum
20 September 1979	Houston	United States	Houston Music Hall
21 September 1979 (Note: Originally scheduled for 22 September 1979.)	Dallas	United States	Dallas Convention Center
22 September 1979 (Note: Originally scheduled for 21 September 1979.)	San Antonio	United States	San Antonio Convention Center
24 September 1979	Beaumont	United States	Beaumont City Auditorium
26 September 1979	Memphis	United States	Dixon–Myers Hall
27 September 1979	Nashville	United States	Nashville Municipal Auditorium
28 September 1979	Johnson City	United States	Freedom Hall Civic Center
29 September 1979 (Note: Originally scheduled for 30 September 1979.)	Charlotte	United States	Charlotte Coliseum
30 September 1979	Greenville	United States	Greenville Memorial Auditorium
2 October 1979	Knoxville	United States	Knoxville Civic Coliseum
3 October 1979	Greensboro	United States	Greensboro Coliseum
5 October 1979	Jacksonville	United States	Jacksonville Coliseum
6 October 1979	Birmingham	United States	Boutwell Memorial Auditorium
7 October 1979	Dothan	United States	Dothan Civic Center
8 October 1979	Atlanta	United States	Fox Theatre
10 October 1979	Columbia	United States	Carolina Coliseum
12 October 1979	Norfolk	United States	Norfolk Municipal Auditorium
13 October 1979	Wheeling	United States	Wheeling Civic Center
14 October 1979	Charleston	United States	Charleston Civic Center
16 October 1979	Towson	United States	Towson Center
17 October 1979	Buffalo	United States	Shea's Performing Arts Center
18 October 1979	Cleveland	United States	Public Auditorium
19 October 1979	Chicago	United States	Aragon Ballroom
20 October 1979	Toledo	United States	Toledo Sports Arena
21 October 1979	Columbus	United States	St. John Arena
26 October 1979 (Note: Originally scheduled for 25 October 1979.)	Newcastle upon Tyne	England	Mayfair Ballroom
27 October 1979	Glasgow	Scotland	The Apollo
28 October 1979	Glasgow	Scotland	The Apollo
29 October 1979	Manchester	England	Manchester Apollo
30 October 1979	Manchester	England	Manchester Apollo
1 November 1979	London	England	Hammersmith Odeon
2 November 1979	London	England	Hammersmith Odeon
3 November 1979	London	England	Hammersmith Odeon
4 November 1979	London	England	Hammersmith Odeon
5 November 1979	Liverpool	England	Liverpool Empire Theatre
6 November 1979	Liverpool	England	Liverpool Empire Theatre
8 November 1979	Stafford	England	Bingley Hall
9 November 1979	Leicester	England	De Montfort Hall
11 November 1979	Brussels	Belgium	Forest National
12 November 1979	Amsterdam	Netherlands	Jaap Edenhal
13 November 1979	Cologne	West Germany	Sartory-Saal
14 November 1979	Hanover	West Germany	Eilenriedehalle
16 November 1979	Essen	West Germany	Grugahalle
17 November 1979 (Note: Originally scheduled for 18 November 1979.)	Kürnach	West Germany	Kurnachtal-Halle
19 November 1979	Passau	West Germany	Nibelungenhalle
20 November 1979	Offenbach	West Germany	Stadthalle
21 November 1979	Dortmund	West Germany	Westfalenhallen
23 November 1979	Hamburg	West Germany	Messehallen
24 November 1979	Munich	West Germany	Circus Krone Building
25 November 1979	Bern	Switzerland	Festhalle
27 November 1979	Regensburg	West Germany	RT Halle
28 November 1979	Regensburg	West Germany	Oberschwabenhalle
29 November 1979	Hof	West Germany	Freiheitshalle
1 December 1979	Ludwigshafen	West Germany	Friedrich-Ebert-Halle
2 December 1979	Neunkirchen	West Germany	Hemmerleinhalle
3 December 1979	West Berlin	West Germany	Eissportahalle
4 December 1979	Offenbach am Main	West Germany	Stadthalle Offenbach
6 December 1979	Metz	France	Metz Expo Hall
7 December 1979	Reims	France	Palais Des Sports
8 December 1979	Lille	France	Foire Commerciale
9 December 1979 (Note: 2 shows have been played.) (Note: Originally scheduled for 7 December 1979.)	Paris	France	Pavillon de Paris
10 December 1979	Grenoble	France	Parc Expo
12 December 1979	Clermont-Ferrand	France	Clermont-Ferrand Sports Hall
13 December 1979	Montpellier	France	Palais Des Sports
14 December 1979	Nice	France	Théâtre de verdure de Nice
15 December 1979	Nice	France	Théâtre de verdure de Nice
17 December 1979	London	England	Hammersmith Odeon
19 December 1979	Brighton	England	Brighton Centre
20 December 1979	Birmingham	England	Birmingham Odeon
21 December 1979	Birmingham	England	Birmingham Odeon

List of 1980 concerts, showing date, city country and venue
Date	City	Country	Venue
16 January 1980	Poitiers	France	—N/a
17 January 1980	Bordeaux	France	—N/a
18 January 1980	Toulouse	France	Gymnase du Lycée Pierre Aragon
19 January 1980	Lyon	France	Palais des Sports de Gerland
20 January 1980	Rouen	France	—N/a
21 January 1980	Nantes	France	Stade de la Beaujoire
22 January 1980	Brest	France	Parc de Penfeld
23 January 1980 (Note: Originally scheduled for 9 December 1979.)	Le Mans	France	La Rotonde
25 January 1980	Newcastle	England	Mayfair Ballroom
27 January 1980 (Note: Originally scheduled for 18 December 1979.)	Southampton	England	Gaumont Theatre

=== Cancelled dates ===
List of concerts, showing date, city, country, venue, and reason for cancellation
Date (1979)	City	Country	Venue	Reason
22 November	Bremen	West Germany	Stadthalle 4	—N/a
30 December	Göppingen	West Germany	Haldenberghalle	—N/a

=== Box office score data ===
List of box office score data with date, city, venue, attendance, gross and references
Date (1979)	City	Venue	Attendance	Gross	Ref(s)
September 5	Oakland, United States	Civic Auditorium	5,000	$49,150	
September 7	Santa Cruz, United States	Civic Auditorium	1,954	$16,694	
September 8	Fresno, United States	Warnors Theatre	2,100	$16,800	
September 18	McAllen, United States	Villa Real	2,439	$18,950	
September 20	Houston, United States	Music Hall	3,005	$24,389	
September 26	Memphis, United States	Dixon–Myers Hall	2,352	$16,710	
September 27	Nashville, United States	Municipal Auditorium	5,093	$36,363	
September 28	Johnson City, United States	Freedom Hall	7,710	$49,675	

== Personnel ==
- Bon Scott – lead vocals
- Angus Young – lead guitar
- Malcolm Young – rhythm guitar, backing vocals
- Cliff Williams – bass guitar, backing vocals
- Phil Rudd – drums
