= Stevie Young =

Australian musician (born 1956)

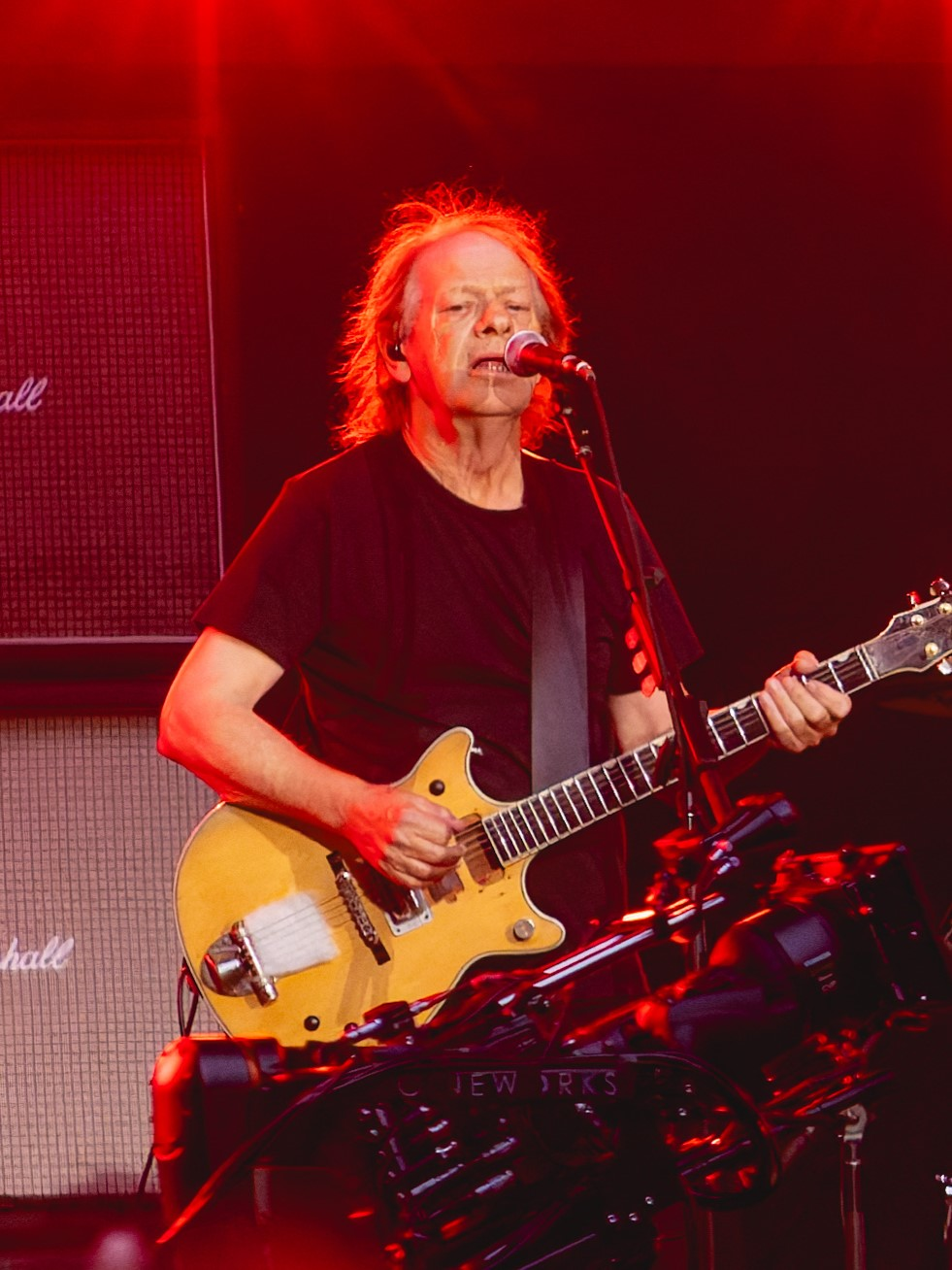
- Young performing in 2024

Background information
- Born: Stephen Crawford Young Jr. 11 December 1956 (age 69); Glasgow, Scotland
- Genres: Hard rock
- Occupation: Musician
- Instrument: Guitar
- Years active: 1979–present
- Label: Columbia
- Member of: AC/DC
- Formerly of: Starfighters
- Website: acdc.com

Stephen Crawford Young Jr. (born 11 December 1956) is a musician and the rhythm guitarist and backing vocalist for the Australian rock band AC/DC. He joined the band in April 2014 to record the group's Rock or Bust album, but was not announced as an official member until September of that year. He replaced his uncle, Malcolm Young, who retired due to dementia. He had previously filled in for Malcolm on AC/DC's 1988 US tour.

== Early life ==
Stephen Crawford Young Jr was born 11 December 1956 in Glasgow, Scotland. Young is the son of Stephen Crawford Young Sr. (1933–1989), who was the eldest brother of Angus, Malcolm, George, and Alex Young. He emigrated with his family from Scotland to Sydney in 1963. The family settled in Concord, New South Wales. He returned to Scotland in 1970.

== Career ==
=== Early music career ===
After his first bands, The Stabbers, Prowler and Tantrum formed in the Scottish Borders town of Hawick in the late 1970s, Young made two albums in the 1980s with his rock band Starfighters, formed 1980 in Birmingham. Starfighters were chosen as support for AC/DC's Back in Black UK Tour in 1980. Starfighters also opened several dates for Ozzy Osbourne in 1982.

Starfighters split in 1983 before coming back together in 1987 for another shot. When that did not work out, Young formed Little Big Horn whose demo tape was produced by Malcolm Young. They soon broke up after a lack of success in signing a record deal, although not before they had recorded a session for Tommy Vance's Friday Rock Show on BBC Radio 1. Young later formed Up Rising, a band that also split up. In 2009, Young was a member of Birmingham rock band Hellsarockin.

When Starfighters bassist Doug Dennis died in 2011, the remaining Starfighters reformed to play at his wake with Young's son Angus on bass.

From July 2013 Young and Pat Hambly from the Starfighters performed in a blues trio with singer Martin Wood called Blue Murda. Blue Murda were later joined on guitar by Young's son, Angus, and John Malan on bass guitar. Angus is the grand-nephew of AC/DC's Angus Young and was briefly a member of AC/DC tribute band AC/DC UK.

=== Career with AC/DC ===
The connection to AC/DC goes back to the 1960s where Young, Angus, and Malcolm attended the same school while growing up in Sydney. Coincidentally, Starfighters was also the name of a Dutch band of AC/DC co-producer Harry Vanda, before his family moved to Australia.

During the late 1970s Young and his brother Fraser occasionally travelled with AC/DC on tour; both were photographed with Angus and Malcolm backstage at Wembley in 1979 during the Highway to Hell Tour.

During the 1988 US tour for AC/DC's album Blow Up Your Video, which started on 3 May 1988, Young filled in for Malcolm on rhythm guitar, while Malcolm left to deal with a growing alcohol dependency. Many fans were not even aware that Malcolm had been replaced, because Young bore a physical resemblance (at the time) to him. Malcolm overcame his drinking problem and returned to the band, staying until his retirement in 2014.

In July 2014, AC/DC's Brian Johnson confirmed that Young had recorded with the band for their upcoming album Rock or Bust, again replacing his ill uncle Malcolm. In September it was confirmed that Young would replace Malcolm on a permanent basis. It was revealed in a Rolling Stone interview that Young had been recruited by Angus as far back as January 2014, before contact had been made with other band members.

Young was involved with AC/DC's 2020 follow-up album, Power Up in which he once again performed rhythm guitar and backing vocals. When asked about the difficulties of having to arrange riffs that he had written with his brother, Angus admitted that Stevie was instrumental in helping with compiling all of the riffs for the record.

== Equipment ==
Young has played a selection of Gretsch Jet Firebirds throughout his career. His first was a black, left-handed Firebird which was modified with an additional set of half-moon fret inlays on the fingerboard, and had the neck pick-up removed. It had an additional jack slot fitted, and a Burns tailpiece. This Firebird was inherited from Malcolm Young, and was used to record with Starfighters in the early 1980s.

Young also inherited another Firebird from Malcolm Young; this one was almost exactly the same as Malcolm's main Gretsch, with the neck pick-up removed, a third pick-up cavity, and the finish removed to leave clear maple. It has a Burns tailpiece, and was Young's no. 1 guitar on AC/DC's Rock Or Bust World tour.

Young uses 0.011 gauge strings for his high E string, although when playing AC/DC material he retains Malcolm's string gauge of 0.012" with a wound G string.

For the Rock or Bust tour, Young used Marshall Amplifiers with Celestion Creamback and Classic Lead 80 speakers as part of his touring set-up.

== Family ==
Young has three children: Lewis, Angus, and Stevie (III). Stevie (III) has a reggae band called Young Culture which also features Young's brother Gus "Goose" on keyboards. Goose also plays in various tribute bands.

== Discography ==
=== Starfighters ===
- Starfighters (1981) Jive Records
- In-Flight Movie (1983) Jive Records

=== AC/DC ===
- Rock or Bust (2014)
- Power Up (2020)
