= Phil Rudd =

Australian drummer (born 1954)

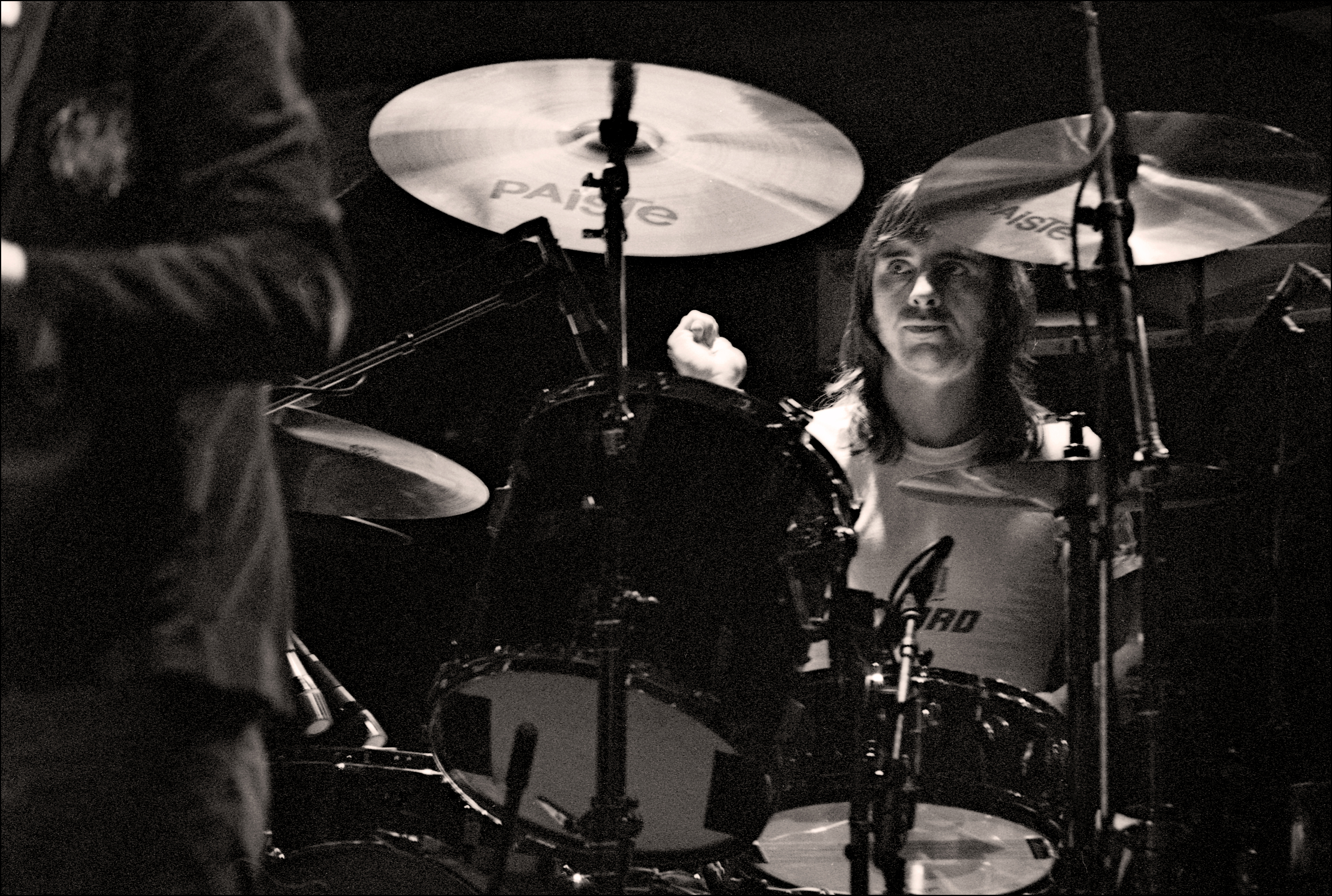
- Rudd live with AC/DC in 1982 at the Manchester Apollo

Background information
- Born: Phillip Hugh Norman Witschke Rudzevecuis; 19 May 1954 (age 72); Melbourne, Victoria, Australia
- Genres: Hard rock; blues rock; rock and roll
- Occupation: Musician
- Instrument: Drums
- Years active: 1972–1983; 1994–present
- Member of: AC/DC
- Formerly of: Buster Brown
- Website: philruddmusic.com

Phillip Hugh Norman Rudd (born Phillip Hugh Norman Witschke Rudzevecuis, 19 May 1954) is an Australian musician, best known as the drummer of AC/DC across three stints (1975–1983, 1994–2015, 2018–present). On the 1977 departure of bass guitarist Mark Evans from AC/DC, Rudd became the only Australian-born member of the band. In 2003, he was inducted into the Rock and Roll Hall of Fame along with the other members of AC/DC. In 2014, Rudd released his first solo album, Head Job. Due to ongoing legal problems in New Zealand, where he is a resident, Rudd was unable to join the band for the 2015 Rock or Bust World Tour and was replaced by Chris Slade. On 30 September 2020, AC/DC confirmed that Rudd would be rejoining the band for their comeback album Power Up.

== Career ==
=== AC/DC ===
In 1974 Rudd was told about AC/DC's rhythm section auditions by his former Coloured Balls bandmate Trevor Young (no relation to AC/DC's Young brothers). Rudd asked Buster Brown bassist Geordie Leach to accompany him to the auditions, but Leach refused due to other commitments. Rudd auditioned and was hired immediately. Rudd's drumming style suited the band's style of music and became an integral part of AC/DC's sound from 1975 to 1983. The band relocated to the United Kingdom in 1976 and followed a heavy schedule of international touring and recording.

A letter written by AC/DC vocalist Bon Scott to his sister Valerie during the 1978 Powerage tour claims Rudd suffered "a bit of a nervous breakdown & had to spend a lot of time with a shrink. It was really bad but luckily he got over it quickly enough not to upset the band. We had to treat him with kid gloves for a bit but he's ok now." The letter was later purchased at an auction by the Western Australian government in 2019, which intended to display the letter at the State Library of Western Australia.

=== First dismissal from AC/DC and hiatus from music ===
AC/DC vocalist Bon Scott died in 1980, an event that left close friend Rudd deeply saddened. He eventually parted ways with the band in 1983 following the recording of the Flick of the Switch album. The split was partly the result of his own personal problems as well as a conflict with the band's rhythm guitarist and founder Malcolm Young, which allegedly escalated to become physical. Rudd had completed his contributions to the album, and although session drummer B.J. Wilson was recruited to help complete the recording, Wilson's drum parts were ultimately not used. Simon Wright was later hired as Rudd's permanent replacement, and featured in the music videos released to promote the album.

After his firing, Rudd retired to Tauranga, New Zealand where he purchased a helicopter company. Rudd's departure from AC/DC didn't become widely known until the eve of their US and Canada tour in 1983. In the last few pages of Circus Magazine's October 1983 edition it stated "Phil Rudd exits AC/DC [...] to spend more time with his family and his cars". Rudd married a New Zealander, Lisa O'Brien, in 1983. Guitarist Angus Young was quoted in the same article as saying "We're a rowdy bunch, but we don't fight with each other". Vocalist Brian Johnson added in a Hit Parader interview from the same period that "You couldn't find a more solid person or drummer than Phil Rudd. None of us would have to work if we didn't want to [...] Phil chose that option".

On his years away from AC/DC, Rudd has said, "I raced cars, flew helicopters, became a farmer and planted some crops. I lived in New Zealand which was great; nice and quiet with nobody bothering me." Rudd also continued to play drums, "when I wanted to rather than when I had to", and built his own recording studio.

=== Return to AC/DC (1994–2015) ===
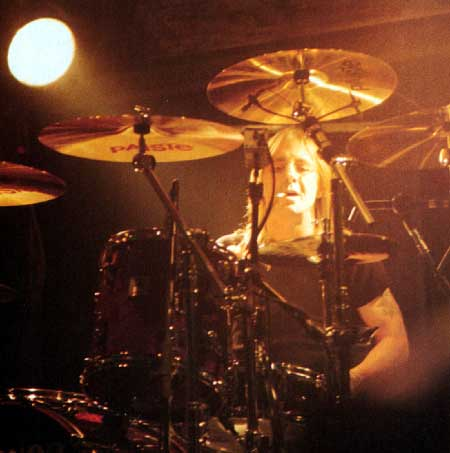
Rudd performing live with AC/DC in 1996

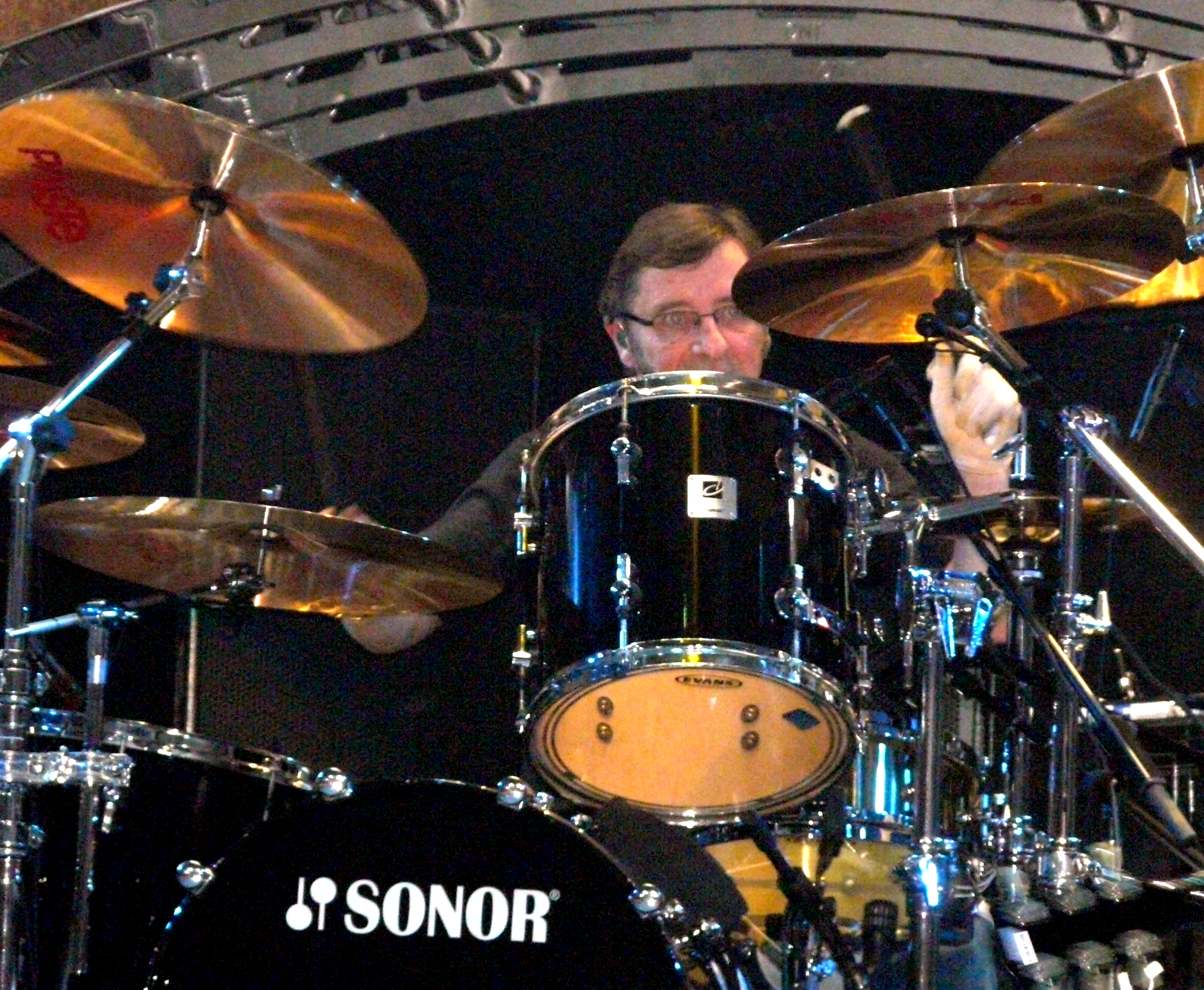
Rudd with AC/DC on 23 November 2008 in Saint Paul, Minnesota

When AC/DC toured New Zealand in 1991 in support of their Razors Edge album, they called Rudd to see if he would be interested in joining them for a casual jam session. Rudd accepted their offer. Though there was no discussion of him rejoining the group at the time, Rudd was invited to permanently rejoin AC/DC in 1994 following the recording of the "Big Gun" single for the Last Action Hero movie soundtrack.

AC/DC welcomed Rudd back after Chris Slade's term as the band's drummer. The band praised Slade for his performance and technical ability, but maintained that a certain groove had been missing from AC/DC's music since Rudd's departure in 1983. After rejoining the band, he performed on five AC/DC studio albums, Ballbreaker, Stiff Upper Lip, Black Ice, Rock or Bust and Power Up, with Black Ice being the band's biggest hit on the charts since For Those About to Rock We Salute You in 1981.

Due to legal problems culminating in his house arrest, Rudd was replaced by former AC/DC drummer Chris Slade for the band's 2015–2016 Rock or Bust tour.

In September 2020, AC/DC posted a photo on social media listing the band's new lineup, including Rudd on drums, as well as a photo featuring him, Angus, Brian Johnson, Cliff Williams and Stevie Young reunited.

=== Head Job European tour (2017) ===
Rudd's first solo album, Head Job, was released on 29 August 2014. New Zealand musicians Allan Badger (bass guitar and vocals) and Geoffrey Martin (guitar) performed on the album alongside Rudd. The album did not receive high praise.

Rudd started a tour of Europe in 2017 with the Phil Rudd Band that included Badger, Martin with British bass guitarist John Proctor and New Zealand guitarist Mike "Mutt" Furness. The tour began in Oslo, Norway on 31 March 2017 and visited Sweden, Finland, the UK, Switzerland, Austria, Italy, Hungary, the Czech Republic and Slovakia. The latter part of the tour was rescheduled for 2018 and then cancelled.

=== Power Up and AC/DC return (2018–present) ===
It was officially confirmed on 30 September 2020 that Rudd had rejoined AC/DC, after two years of rumours that he, along with fellow band mates Brian Johnson and Cliff Williams, would be returning. However, Rudd sat out of the band’s 2023 performance at Power Trip as well as their subsequent Power Up Tour in 2024. It was later revealed that Rudd’s absence from these performances was a result of him opting to stay home with his partner, who is currently battling stage four breast cancer. His role was filled in on the tour by American drummer Matt Laug.

== Personal life ==
Born on 19 May 1954 in Melbourne, Rudd came from a German and Irish background; his stepfather was Lithuanian. He began playing drums in his teens and became serious about pursuing a career in music. He played in several bands in Melbourne before joining Buster Brown with future Rose Tattoo vocalist Angry Anderson. They went on to release one album, Something To Say, in 1974, before Rudd left to join the Coloured Balls with Lobby Loyde.

Rudd married New Zealander Lisa O'Brien in 1983. They have five children. The pair separated in 2006.

In November 2023, Rudd announced the sale of his personal memorabilia, including drum kits and drumsticks from renowned performances, to support the New Zealand Breast Cancer Foundation. Motivated by his partner Toni Wilson's fight against terminal stage 4 breast cancer, Rudd's initiative aimed to raise funds and awareness for the disease.

=== Drug conviction and appeal ===
On 7 October 2010 Rudd was arrested in Tauranga, New Zealand, for drug possession, and was subsequently convicted on 1 December 2010 of possessing 25 g of marijuana but later had his cannabis conviction quashed on the grounds that it would have stopped him from continuing to tour with AC/DC.

=== Restaurant ===
On 30 July 2011, it was announced that Rudd had purchased and would open a marina restaurant at Bridge Marina in Tauranga, where he resides. He named it "Phil's Place", and planned to sell seafood and steak. The restaurant closed temporarily in July 2012, and reopened on 10 April 2013. In 2014, Rudd was ordered to pay more than $70,000 to three former employees for unjustified dismissal. Rudd reportedly fired the employees after his dinner order was delivered to the wrong location. On 5 May 2019, Phil's Place changed ownership, and was renamed "Salinity Restaurant and Bar".

=== Death threats and drug charges ===
On 6 November 2014, Rudd was arrested and charged with attempting to procure a murder, threatening to kill, possession of methamphetamine and possession of cannabis, following a police raid on his home in New Zealand. The charge of attempting to procure a murder was withdrawn the following day. On 21 April 2015, he pleaded guilty to the remaining charges, with the exception of one of the two threatening to kill charges, which was dropped.

His ongoing legal problems led to the recruitment of AC/DC's former drummer Chris Slade in time for the band's Rock or Bust World Tour. In an interview on 13 November 2014, Angus Young had stated that AC/DC had experienced problems with Rudd earlier in the year when recording Rock or Bust, and that his situation had taken the band by surprise. Rudd had also missed video and photo shoots. Young said, "He's got to sort himself out I think. ... At this point it's kind of a question mark. But if we're touring, there will be a drummer in place, put it that way." In the same interview, Young also said, "Phil created his own situation. It's a hard thing to say about the guy. He's a great drummer, and he's done a lot of stuff for us. But he seems to have let himself go. He's not the Phil we've known from the past." In May 2015, Rudd stated that he hoped to return, but said that he had no contact from the band, adding, "I'm sure they're having a great old time. ... I've seen the error of my ways. ... It's onward and upward from here."

On 9 July 2015, Rudd was sentenced to eight months' home detention and ordered to pay NZ$120,000 in reparation. His appeal to be discharged without conviction was rejected. A subsequent appeal of the sentence to the High Court was dismissed. In a 2016 interview, Rudd said that since completing his home detention that March, he was seeing a psychiatrist weekly and had given up the "crazy shit". He also revealed he planned to tour Europe to promote his album Head Job.
