= Alan Warner (musician) =

English musician (born 1947)

- Also known as: Allan Warner
- Born: 21 April 1947 (age 79)
- Origin: Paddington, West London, England
- Genres: Rock, soul, R&B, pop
- Occupation: Musician
- Instrument: Guitar
- Years active: 1961–present
- Labels: Pye Records, Dawn Records
- Member of: Edison Lighthouse
- Formerly of: The Skeletones, The Ramong Sound, The Foundations, Pluto, The Polecats

Alan Warner (aka Allan Warner) (born 21 April 1947, Paddington in West London, England) is an English musician who has been active from around the mid-1960s. He was a member of groups such as The Ramong Sound, The Foundations, Pluto, and The Polecats.

He was one of the founding members of The Foundations who would have hits with "Baby, Now That I've Found You", "Back On My Feet Again" and "Build Me Up Buttercup" and "In the Bad Bad Old Days (Before You Loved Me)". He played rhythm guitar and lead guitar as well as contributing to the song writing efforts of the group and backing both of the band's lead singers Clem Curtis and later Colin Young.

== Background ==
Alan Warner was born to parents John and Mary Warner on 21 April 1947, in Paddington. Warner is the youngest child of four children (two brothers and a sister).

As a boy he originally wanted to play trumpet but ended up with a toy accordion. He started playing guitar at the age of 11, after his parents bought him a cheap Spanish guitar for Christmas, and he soon realised, listening to the twangy tones of Duane Eddy, Hank Marvin, The Ventures, he wanted to do music professionally.

At some stage he was employed as a printer. According to the back cover of the Foundations' album Digging the Foundations (1969), Warner is 5 ft 4in. In 1967, he was living in Elstree, Hertfordshire with his parents. Alan claims to have made guitars out of old bed frames.

== Musical career ==
In the early 1960s, after leaving school at the age of fourteen, Warner played with several semi-professional groups playing local gigs, before becoming a professional musician two years later. Some of the groups he played in were The Leesiders Sect, The Skeletones and The Line-up, a popular Dublin-based group.

His first band was called The Select, a band that mainly covered Rnb songs. The band entered a Beat music competition in 1965, and with a rule that each act had to perform an original song, Warner penned his first song "Red, White And Blue For You".

After a short stint in the Skeletones, he moved to the south of Ireland. Warner nearly joined a group called The Black Eagles, which included Phil Lynott and Brian Downey, both later members of Thin Lizzy, but he turned it down.

=== The Ramong Sound ===
In 1966, Warner placed an ad in a music magazine looking for work in a band. Soul music was coming into England and thought it would be nice to join a soul type band. He got a reply and then passed an audition with a black band who were playing all over London. He got another call and turned up at a pub in Edmonton where the band was. The band didn't have any gigs but Warner felt that they had some great ideas. So for some reason, he decided to go with the Ramong, and became a member of The Ramong Sound, a soul and ska group fronted by Raymond Morrison AKA Ramong which also featured Clem Curtis on vocals. Another member was Nigerian born star trumpeter, Mike Falana, who had previously been with Graham Bond Organisation, having replaced Jack Bruce.

They ended up leasing the Butterfly club. Warner would be present though the band's name changes and evolution. Morrison ended up being imprisoned for six months. They did try and enlist Rod Stewart and they jammed with him but Stewart was heading into other genres. They did manage to have Arthur Brown in their group for a couple of months where he shared lead with Clem Curtis before kicking off his own band the Crazy World of Arthur Brown.

=== The Foundations ===
The group was eventually discovered by Ron Fairway who managed the group, The Ways and Means Fairway introduced them to a businessman called Barry Class. The original line up as they became known for was Clem Curtis (Curtis Clements) on vocals, Tim Harris on drums, Peter Macbeth (Peter McGrath) on bass Eric Allan Dale (Eric Allandale) on trombone, Allan Warner on lead guitar, Tony Gomesz on organ, Pat Burke on tenor sax and Mike Elliott on tenor sax.

Ron Fairway's group, The Ways and Means were apparently offered the chance to record "Baby Now That I've Found You" but felt that it wasn't for them. So, The Foundations with Clem Curtis on lead vocals and Warner on guitar recorded it and it became a massive hit.

After the group had two more hits with Clem Curtis, "Back on My Feet Again" and "Any Old Time (You're Lonely and Sad)" things were set to change. Clem Curtis decided to leave the band, and they tried out singers which included Warren Davis of the Warren Davis Monday Band. Another hopeful was allegedly Hue Montgomery.

The successor to Curtis turned out to be Colin Young. He was set to record "Build Me Up Buttercup" once things were finalized with Major Minor Records which was his former label. With Young, the group released "Build Me Up Buttercup".

"Build Me Up Buttercup" entered the UK chart on 26 19 November 1968 and made the no. 2 spot on 31 December, spending a total of fifteen weeks in the chart. Warner co-wrote "New Direction" with Peter Macbeth and Tony Gomesz, which was included on the B side of the hit. which was released in the earlier part of November, 1968.

==== Digging the Foundations (album) ====
By July 1969, the group's album Digging the Foundations had been released. It contained compositions Tony Macaulay and John Macleod as well as compositions by band members, Warner, Pete McBeth, Tony Gomesz, Colin Young, Pat Burke and Eric Allandale.

In addition to "I Can Feel It", "My Little Chickadee", and the big hit "In the Bad Bad Old Days", it also featured "Till Night Brought Day" which Warner co-wrote with Peter Macbeth and Tony Gomesz.

==== Further activities with The Foundations ====
On Friday 19 July 1969, Warner's Fender Stratocaster was stolen while the group's van was being unloaded in Birmingham. This caused the group to delay their recording of the B side to their single, "Born to Live, Born to Die". As a result, the released of the single was delayed by a week.

It had been noted by New Musical Express in the week ending 10 October 1970 that Colin Young, lead singer of The Foundations had left the group to pursue a solo career. He had already entered into a contract with Barry Class and was putting together his new group which was called Development. The group then broke up at the end of the year.

=== Pluto ===
With The Foundations having broken up at the end of 1970, Warner had gone on to join the progressive rock band Pluto, who would sign up to the Dawn Label, a subsidiary of PYE. The band was already formed and Warner had come in and replaced the previous guitarist.

The group was made up of Alan Warner on lead guitar and vocals, Paul Gardner of lead guitar and vocals, Terry Sullivan on drums and Mick Worth on bass.

One gig they did was on 13 October 1971. Pluto appeared at the College of Education in Coventry with Barclay James Harvest. That month also saw the release of their single, "Rag-A-Bone Joe" bw "Stealing My Thunder" on Dawn DNS.1017 as well as Pye PV. 15371. Also that month on the 21st, they appeared at the Maria Grey College in Twickenham with Medicine Head.

Their self-titled album was released on Dawn DNLS 3030 in November, 1971. Produced by John Macleod, he contributed some piano to the album. It was released in France and South Africa on Pye and in Australia on Astor.

=== The Polecats ===
It was noted in the 7 February 1983 issue of Record Business that Alan Warner was the new guitarist with the group The Polecats and the group after a year's absence had returned to the scene with a new single, "Make A Circuit With Me".

=== Reconnection with Foundations members ===
Warner later teamed up with original Foundations lead singer Clem Curtis to re-cut the original Foundations hits. The result was Greatest Hits released on Double Play GRF176 in or around 1994. The recordings were produced and arranged by Keith Bateman and besides Warner on guitar and Curtis on lead vocals, featured Andy Bennett on Drums and Vince Cross on keyboards. In addition to In addition to "Build Me Up Buttercup", "The Bad Bad Old Days", "Baby, Now That I've Found You", "Back on My Feet Again", "Any Old Time (You're Lonely and Sad)" and "Born to Live, Born to Die", they re-recorded Warner's compositions, "New Direction" and "You Can't Fool Me".

In the late 1990s, due to the popularity of the hit film, There's Something About Mary and the revived interest in the song, "Build Me Up Buttercup", Warner reformed a version of The Foundations that featured Colin Young, and another former Foundations member, Steve Bingham. After Colin Young left another singer Hue Montgomery was brought in to front the group. and they toured throughout the UK and down under in Australia.

=== Alan Warner's Foundations ===
In 2012, Warner and his Foundations had planned to take a mini tour. The exercise proved to be a success that they added more dates which included a date in Borehamwood in February.

Alan Warner's Foundations performed "Barefooting" which was uploaded to Youtube on 30 September 2013.

A live version of Warner's composition "You Can't Fool Me" was uploaded to Youtube on 2 October 2013. It was performed by Alan Warner's Foundations and featured Hue Montgomery on vocals.

In May 2014, Warner's Foundations which was made up of himself on guitar and backing vocals, Hue Montgomery on lead vocals, Dave Lennox on keyboards, John Dee on bass and backing vocals, Pete Stroud on drums, Nick Payn on saxophone, and Matt Winch on trumpet were set to undertake the Superstars of Soul Tour which was to continue until August. Other artists were Geno Washington and Jaki Graham.

An article about Warner and his Foundations ensemble appeared in 8 February 2020 issue of the Ilkley Gazette. They were booked to appear at the King’s Hall at 7pm Friday, 28 February. The line up at the time was Hue Montgomery on lead vocals, Alan Warner on lead guitar and backing vocals, Paul Hirsch on keyboards, Roger Nicholas on bass and backing vocals, Pete Stroud on drums, Nick Payn on saxophone and Backing Vocals), and Matt Winch on Trumpet.

As of August 2022, Warner was still playing venues with Hue Montgomery as the vocalist for his version of The Foundations.

Montgomery who has worked outside Alan Warner's Foundations as part of the duo Soul Providers with Chris Robin since 2007 performed at the opening of the Dovecote Barn in 2019. He was booked to appear on his own at the Crows Nest pub in Leicester on Saturday 17 December and New Years eve 2022 with Kelly Jenns. Chris Robin posted on Facebook on 17 August 2026 that he had been informed that his musical duo partner of fifteen years, Hue Montgomery had died that morning.

=== Further activities ===
In 2010, his book 100 Lead Licks For Guitar was published. In January, 2017, Warner, Iain Houndog Terry and other artists were appearing at the Back In Our Rock ‘N’ Roll Days show which was headlined 1960s star Billie Davis known for the hit "Tell Him".

Warner got together with bassist Roger Nicolas, vocalist Terry Rice-Milton, tambourine player Martyn McCoy, backing vocalist Nancy Ann Lee, drummer Tristan Long and vocalist Stefan Long. And from different locations they recorded their version of the Frank Wilson northern soul classic "Do I Love You". The clip was uploaded to Youtube on 15 January 2021.

In 2022, the three CD compilation Am I Groovin' You was released on the Cherry Red Records subsidiary, Strawberry (cat# CRJAM011T). The liner notes by Lois Wilson were based on a fresh interview with Warner.

On 20 January 2024, Warner joined Edison Lighthouse.

According to a notification on the 2NUR FM website, dated 2 December 2024 Alan Warner was set to appear on Jack Hodgins' Vinyl Vibes the coming Sunday 8th at 6:00pm.

=== Bibliography ===
As well as being a musician / guitarist / guitar teacher, Warner is also an author of various guitar instruction books and instructional videos that include How To Play Rock Blues Guitar. The first book he wrote was called The Guitar Cook Book, the first of a succession of about 30 similar books and videos. He has also played on releases by Bob Mortimore and The Bobby Graham band.

== Publications ==
- The Blues Guitar, By Alan Warner, Published by Waltons Mnf. Ltd, (1986)
- The Guitar Cookbook, By Alan Warner (Not officially published. Sold at venues)
- 100 Lead Licks For Guitar, By Alan Warner, Omnibus Music Sales Limited, 2010 - ISBN 9781849383875
- How to Play Electric Blues Guitar, By Alan Warner - Music Sales America (1 January 2000) - ISBN 978-0825617935
- Country Guitar Licks: Start Playing Series by Alan Warner - Music Sales America (2000) - ISBN 978-0825617867
