= The Foundations =

British soul band (1966–1970)

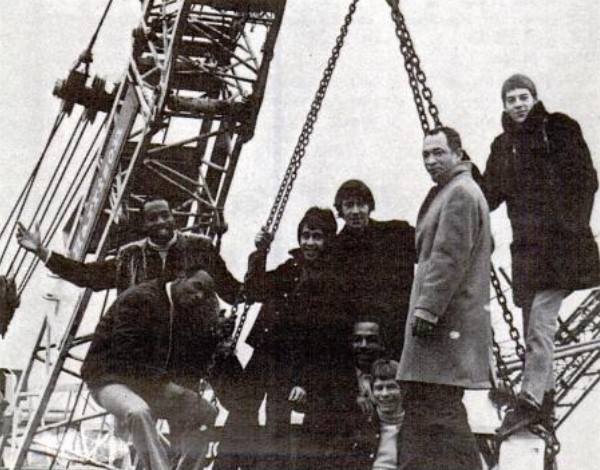
- The Foundations in 1968

Background information
- Origin: London, England
- Genres: Soul, pop, rock
- Years active: 1966–1970
- Labels: Pye, Castle, Uni, Astor, Repertoire
- Spinoffs: Development; Clem Curtis & the Foundations
- Spinoff of: The Ramong Sound
- Past members: Original line-up Eric Allandale; Pat Burke; Clem Curtis; Mike Elliott; Tony Gomez; Tim Harris; Peter MacBeth; Alan Warner

The Foundations were a British soul band primarily active between 1967 and 1970. The group's background was West Indian, White British, and Sri Lankan. Their 1967 debut single "Baby Now That I've Found You" reached number one in the UK and Canada, and number eleven in the US. Their 1968 single "Build Me Up Buttercup" reached number two in the UK and number three on the US Billboard Hot 100. The group was the first multi-racial group to have a number one hit in the UK in the 1960s.

They were one of the few British acts to imitate successfully what became known as the Motown Sound, and signed to Pye, at the time one of only four big UK record companies (the others being EMI, which included the His Master's Voice, Columbia and Parlophone labels, Decca, and Philips, which also owned Fontana).

== Background ==
The Foundations attracted much interest because of the size and structure of the group, with members of diverse ethnic backgrounds, ages, and musical backgrounds. The oldest member of the group (at 38) was Mike Elliott, and the youngest was Tim Harris, who at 18 was barely out of school. The West Indian horn section consisted of Jamaican-born Elliott and Pat Burke, both saxophonists, and Dominican-born Eric Allandale on trombone. They were all highly experienced musicians who came from professional jazz and rock-and-roll backgrounds.

- Eric Allandale had led the New Orleans Knights in the early 1960s, releasing two singles, including "Enjoy Yourself (It's Later than You Think)". He also played with Edmundo Ros, and was a former member of the Terry Lightfoot and Alex Welsh bands. He was also a member of Romeo Z, who recorded the title song for the 1966 film Kaleidoscope and an Irving Martin produced single "Come Back, Baby Come Back", released on CBS in 1967.
- Pat Burke had been in groups since arriving in the UK at age 15, and studied music at the London Music Conservatorium. "A man of few words", according to Bob Farmer of Disc and Music Echo (who also described him as "a dormant Desmond Dekker"), Burke's first love was jazz. He played with jazz groups, but as the jobs did not pay much, he joined The Foundations.
- Clem Curtis was born in Trinidad, and was an interior decorator and professional boxer. He had a background in wrestling and weight-lifting.
- Mike Elliott came to the group after he had heard from one of the members that they were looking for a tenor saxophonist. He had played in various jazz and rock and roll bands, as well as the ensembles of Tubby Hayes and Ronnie Scott, the Cabin Boys (led by Tommy Steele's brother, Colin Hicks), and others. He had recorded under his own name for Sonny Roberts' Planetone label, which issued early ska and reggae records, and he was a member of Rico's Combo, the label's house band led by Rico Rodriguez.
- Tony Gomez, the keyboard player, was a former clerk who had worked in County Hall in the architect's department.
- Drummer Tim Harris, who was born in St. John's Wood, London, had two brothers, including his twin, Nick. According to an article, "Digging the Foundations", by Bob Farmer in the 5 July 1969 issue of Disc and Music Echo, Harris had joined the merchant navy as a deckhand on a timber ship and had travelled to various parts of the world, including Siberia. He came back to the UK and became involved with groups.
- Bassist Peter Macbeth was a former teacher who had taught English and draughtsmanship in Singapore and worked for a paperback publisher.
- Guitarist Alan Warner had been in bands the Skeletones and the Line-up, a popular Dublin-based group. Warner turned down an offer to join the Black Eagles, which included Phil Lynott and Brian Downey.

== Origin ==
The origins of the Foundations go back to an R&B and ska outfit called the Ramong Sound, aka Ramongs. The band had two lead singers, Raymond Morrison (aka Ramong Morrison) and Clem Curtis. Curtis had come to the group by way of his guitar-playing uncle, who was impressed by his nephew's voice and told him that there was a band called the Ramongs looking for singers. Curtis auditioned and joined the band, and rose from being a backing singer to sharing the lead with Raymond Morrison.

At some stage Morrison was imprisoned for six months. In his absence, a friend of the band called Joan who ran a record store, suggested future psychedelic shock rocker Arthur Brown as a replacement. Brown was straight and clean living, and did not drink, smoke or take drugs. Decades later, Brown recalled when he walked into the Westbourne Grove bar for an audition, he saw Curtis holding a spear to the throat of the drummer, bent backwards over the bar. Brown and Curtis each performed solo numbers as well as duets and one of the band members recalled later that they had experimented with "underground-type music" when Brown was with them.

The group had unsuccessfully tried to recruit Rod Stewart as a singer. They had a jam session with him, but he turned down their offer as he preferred other musical styles. Alan Warner recalled decades later that Stewart's then girlfriend, Dee Harrington, had ended up being secretary for the Foundations' management.

The Foundations are said to have formed in Bayswater, London, in January 1967. They practised and played in a basement coffee bar club called the Butterfly Club, which they also ran. The premises were at one time `used as a gambling den. While managing the club themselves, they played music nightly and handled the cooking and cleaning. They would get to bed around 6am or 7am, sleep until 4pm, and open again at 8pm. Sometimes they barely made enough money to pay the rent, occasionally living off leftovers and a couple of pounds of rice. Gomez recalled in 1969 that he, MacBeth, Allandale and Harris were living on £2 per week and could not afford a packet of razor blades. His mother would come and tell him off for leaving his job in the County Hall architect's department. The situation of saxophonist Mike Elliott was also not ideal. He had been staying in a top floor flat, in a condemned house, where the roof had been removed. Elliott was still paying rent. Clem Curtis recalled going to see him one morning, knocking on his door which got Elliott out of bed. He asked him, "Hey, Mike, where's your roof gone?", to which Elliott replied, "I don't know, man, they just came and knocked it off."

== Career ==
=== 1967 ===
The 4 February 1967 issue of Melody Maker shows a booking for the Ramong Sound (mis-spelt as Ramog Sound) to play at the All-Star Club on Sunday, 5 February.

Following the band being forced out of their club by a protection racket gang who tied up Clem Curtis and held a knife to his throat, they moved next door to the new premises, a run-down place that was once a mini-cab office. According to Alan Warner in his interview with It's Psychedelic Baby Magazine, dated 22 July 2011, this is where they were discovered. The biography on AllMusic stated that Barry Class was the first to discover them. Other sources claim they were discovered by Ron Fairway, a man with many music connections and who managed the group, the Ways and Means. Fairway had his own agency, Ron Fairway Enterprises which was located at 6 Artesian Road, London W.2. Fairway already had some success with his group, the Ways and Means. They already had record out, "Sea of Faces" on Pye. It got to no.39 on the Radio City City Sixty chart for the Sunday 1 - Sunday 8 January 1967 period, and on the 21st, no. 41 on the Radio Caroline chart. Interestingly the Ways and Means would later end up being involved with a label that Barry Class created.

In August 2023, Alan Warner was interviewed by Jack Hodgins of the Australian radio station, 2NUR FM. The interview appears to suggest that Raymond Morrison was still in the group when Ron Fairway approached them.

Ron Fairway told the group that he was going to get them a gig at Herne Bay. However, this job never materialized. The group sourced their own gigs which included a Caribbean club along Edgware Road and a few other clubs.

The Foundations were booked to appear at Eel Pie Island on Sunday 14 May 1967. Appearing as a support act, for their efforts they were paid a sum of £10.

Arthur Brown appears to have left the group between the first and second quarter of 1967. According to a 1993 interview of Brown with Allan Vorda, Arthur Brown could have signed with the Foundations and sung material from the writers of "Baby, Now That I've Found You" but he did not want to be with the group for two years.

The day Tony Macaulay came to hear the Foundations play, he was suffering from what he described as "the worst hangover of his life". The band was playing so loud he could not judge how good they were, but he decided to give them a chance. His comments are recorded in the book, 1000 UK No. 1 Hits by Jon Kutner and Spencer Leigh, that he woke up that morning with a stinking headache, and when he got to the studio and heard the Foundations, he thought they were terrible. He decided his hangover was to blame, and so he gave them the benefit of the doubt.

At first, they found progress quite slow, and one of their sax players, Pat Burke, had to drop out of the band and take another job while they went through a rough patch. He later rejoined them in 1967.

They were noticed by Brian Epstein, who added them to the roster of his NEMS Agency, but the contract became void after he died on 27 August 1967.

"Baby, Now that I've Found You"

According to Roy Delo of Ron Fairway's group, the Ways and Means, they were offered the chance to record "Baby Now That I've Found You", but they turned it down. So it was given to the Foundations, and they recorded it with Clem Curtis on lead vocals.

It was released on 25 August 1967. Reviewed in the Quick Spins section of Disc and Music Echo, the reviewer Benny Valentine liked it but remarked that it needed a bit more drive on the production and singing. It was a sleeper And for ten weeks it did not do anything in the charts. Unlike the Ways and Means' single, "Sea of Faces" which was played on the pirate radio stations, charting on both Radio City and Radio Caroline, "Baby, Now that I've Found You" was not played on them. Luckily, the BBC's newly founded BBC Radio 1 was looking to avoid any records being played by the pirate radio stations and looked back at some recent releases that the pirate stations had missed. "Baby, Now That I've Found You" was one of them. The single then took off. The group members except for Pat Burke were pictured on page 4 of the 7 October issue of New Musical Express. The single had broken into the New Musical Express chart at no. 25 that week. And by November was number one in the UK Singles Chart. The Foundations were pictured on the front page of the 11 November issue of Melody Maker. Moving up from the previous week's no. 2 spot, they pushed the Bee Gees' single, "Massachusetts" off of the no. 1 spot of the Melody Maker Pop 30 chart. This period was the ideal time for the group because of the soul boom that was happening in the UK since 1965 and, with American R&B stars visiting the country, interest and intrigue in the Foundations was generated.

With the Foundations in the top spot with "Baby, Now That I've Found You", Ron Fairway commented to Melody Maker that most managements would have pulled them out of the "bargain priced dates" that had been booked for some time. He expressed gratitude to everyone for their support, and said that they would fulfill every engagement for which they had signed.

In addition to establishing the Foundations as a group, "Baby, Now That I've Found You" was also the song that established their song writer Tony Macaulay.

Further activities

According to the 21 October issue of Disc and Music Echo, when the Foundations' single at no. 11 in the chart, the group had been booked for two star shows. One was for 31 October at Bily Smart's Circus at London Clapham Common, an event where a member of the Royal Family attends each year. The other was for 11 November to play at a banquet for the Lord Mayor and civic dignitaries.

Not long after their success with "Baby, Now That I've Found You", there were issues. Rock historian Roger Dopson describes what followed as a "behind the scenes struggle", where Fairway was "pushed out" and his partner, Barry Class, remained as sole manager of the group. Fairway later attempted to sue the band, alleging that he was wrongfully dismissed as the group's co-manager, though the band said that he had resigned of his own accord. The 2 December issue of New Musical Express wrote that it was likely to be several months before the case would be heard. According to Dopson, Fairway had leaked a story to the media saying that the Foundations had broken up which only served to keep the Foundations name in the news headlines. Barry Class was quoted in the 18 November issue of Melody Maker as saying that it was a friction of personalities and it had been going on for about four months. It was also confirmed by New Musical Express that same week that Fairway no longer had any association with the group and that agency representation would be only handled by Class. New Musical Express had the exclusive on the follow up to "Baby, Now That I've Found You" being "Back on My Feet Again". The article also said that the group would be doing a string of radio and television appearances to tie in with the single's release. With "Baby, Now that I've Found You" being released in the United States on the Uni label that week, they were filming a US promo for the single and hoping to fit in a three-day visit to the States at the end of the month. They were also planning to fly to the United States after the completion of their radio and television promotions for "Back on My Feet Again" in January.

With the success of "Baby Now that I've Found You" having been established, there was talk within the group of adding a trumpet player to the line-up. Both Allandale and Burke could double on trumpet, but they were still looking to add one.

Debut album

The readers of New Musical Express were alerted to the new album by the Foundations with the words in bold, New LPs by Foundations and Jimi Hendrix on the front cover of the 25 November issue. The album From the Foundations was issued on Pye NPL 18206. Nick Logan, NME reviewer gave the album a solid review and a track by track analysis, noting the Four Tops feel of "The Writings on the Wall". One of his favorites was "Mr. Personality Man". One song he did not warm to was "Call Me". Other tracks on the album were Joe Tex's "Show Me" and "Jerking the Dog", a Mighty Hannibal song, mistakenly referred to as a Rufus Thomas song.

=== 1968 ===
The Foundations would tour the United States after their first hit, playing 32 states with artists such as Big Brother and the Holding Company, Maxine Brown, Tim Buckley, Solomon Burke, the Byrds, the Crazy World of Arthur Brown and the Fifth Dimension.

In January 1968, Barry Class had started his label, Trend Records. Eric Allandale would be recruited to produce records for the label.

The group was in France in January and they appeared on the Bouton Rouge television show. Their appearance was recorded on 30 January.

"Back on My Feet Again"

According to bass guitarist Peter MacBeth, they had a choice of three songs. They recorded two and then chose "Back on My Feet Again". This, their second single was released in January 1968, It was reviewed by New Musical Express in the magazine's 20 January issue. It was referred to as a scorcher and a very good pop record. The throaty vocals, organ, handclaps, brass and stormy beat were obvious bonuses. The only criticisms, minor as they were, was that the tune was not as catchy as the B-side, "Need Your Loving" (the reviewer most likely referring to the B side, "I Can Take or Leave Your Loving"), and too much top (possibly referring the treble). Along with the Tremeloes and the Alan Price Set etc., they were set for a BBC-1 appearance in the next few days. The single made its debut at no. 24 in the Melody Maker Pop 30 on the week of 10 February. It also debuted at no. 24 in the Disc and Music Echo TOP 30 chart that week.

It did not do as well as the first single, but it spent ten weeks in the UK chart, and made it to No. 18. It made it to No. 29 in Canada.

Further activities

In January 1968, they were invited to put down some tracks for John Peel's radio show. One of the tracks that they laid down was a cover of ? and the Mysterians garage classic "96 Tears". On the same day, PP Arnold was in the studio with Dusty Springfield and Madeline Bell as her backing vocalists. However, the list of tracks given on the BBC site are, "A Whole New Thing", "Back on My Feet Again" and "Help Me". In the book, The Peel Sessions by Ken Garner, the songs listed are, "A Whole New Thing", "Back On My Feet Again", "Help Me" and "96 Tears". A recording of "96 Tears" did find its way on to an EP, Baby, Now That I've Found You, released on Pye PNV 24199.

The 10 February 1968 issue of Billboard ran a picture of Louis Benjamin, head of Pye Records presenting a gold record to three members of the Foundations to mark the million sales of their debut single. Also pictured was the group's manager Barry Class.

Bass player Peter MacBeth was interviewed by Bob Dawbarn for the 17 February issue of Melody Maker. He said that they had a van for their equipment and had recently bought a twelve-seater car that used to belong to the Queen Mother. There was still speculation on whether the group would add a trumpet player. Macbeth said that if they do go to the United States, they would pick up one to tour with them.

Since "Back on My Feet Again" (their second single) had been released, tensions developed between the band and their songwriter/producer, Tony Macaulay. He would not allow them to record any of their own songs. In an interview, the band's organ player, Tony Gomez, told the New Musical Express (NME) that he, Peter MacBeth, and Eric Allandale had some ideas that they wanted to put together. Curtis later recalled that Macaulay was a problem. "Tony Macaulay was very talented, but could be difficult to get on with. When we asked to record some of our own material – just as B sides, we weren't after the A side – he called us 'ungrateful' and stormed out of the studio." The group felt that Macaulay had reined in their "real" sound, making them seem more pop-oriented than they were. Tony Macaulay also recalled, "I was never close to the Foundations. I couldn't stand them, and they hated me! But the body of work we recorded was excellent."

According to the 8 March issue of New Musical Express, Tony Macaulay was to fly to the United States on 20 May for ten days. While there, he was to supervise some recording sessions in Detroit by The Foundations who were to cut an album and a single there.

A third single, also released in 1968 was "Any Old Time (You're Lonely and Sad)". It had been announced for release for 26 April. It was backed with an Eric Allandale composition, "We Are Happy People". It was also mentioned in the 27 April issue of Disc and Music Echo that the single was due for release "Tomorrow". The magazine also mentioned the recent completion of the group's "next album" which is rush-released in the US and would be available in the UK within the next eight weeks.

"Any Old Time" would enter the UK charts at no. 48 and stay around for 2 weeks.

An article "Ireland not for us" appeared in the April 1968 issue of Beat Instrumental which told of a near violent situation involving Clem Curtis where he had been accused of being involved in a fight the night before. It was at the end of a dance that the group had played at and Curtis was at the bar. Curtis said, "I went to the bar, and was confronted by a guy who stuck a knife in my stomach". Curtis had to talk himself out of the situation which took an hour.

It was reported in the 27 July issue of Melody Maker that legal action had been taken against the Foundations by Raymond Morrison. In a court hearing that took three hours, Morrison claimed that he had discovered the talent of the group. He failed in his bid to put a freeze on a portion of the group's earnings. He had been released from prison in July 1967 following a six-month sentence for assault. The case was heard by Judge Stamp who said in reference to "Baby, Now That I've Found You", "I cannot understand how it can be suggested that a song which came into existence after Mr. Morrison had severed his connection with the group can he one in which he can have any share or interest". He also dismissed a similar motion against the Pye label.

It was reported by Melody Maker in the 24 August issue that The Foundations were completing a live album allegedly recorded live in Britain and the US. The album Rocking the Foundations was cited for release in mid-September. Disc and Music Echo also reported the same thing in their 27 August issue.

Curtis and Elliott leave the group

By August, rumors had leaked out that Clem Curtis may be leaving the group. The group had been together for a year when there was speculation on this. Melody Maker wrote in their 31 August issue, that at press-time no confirmation could be obtained. They did however write that he wanted to develop his career and record as a solo artist with Tony Macaulay. Curtis had made a request to record a solo record. Paul McCartney had also offered to write a song for Curtis. It was also suggested that Curtis left in 1968, because he felt that a couple of the band's members were taking it a bit too easy, thinking that because they had now had a hit, they did not have to put in as much effort as they had previously. Curtis' reason for leaving differs from member Alan Warner's reason, who in 2022 claimed Curtis left because he tried to change the band name to "Clem Curtis & the Foundations" and left when the band refused.

An advertisement appeared on page 22 of the 14 September 1968, issue of Melody Maker. Class Management on behalf of the Foundations were inviting enquiries from soul, r&b and progressive singers who considered themselves suitable to join the above-named group. Saxophonist Mike Elliott also left around this time and was never replaced. Curtis hung around and helped them audition a replacement singer. They auditioned 200 singers. It was reported in the 14 September issue of Melody Maker that they were also trying out Warren Davis of the Warren Davis Monday Band for the role. Curtis said he would not leave the band until they found a replacement. He had become friendly with Sammy Davis Jr., and was encouraged to try his luck in the United States. Also in that month, they played at the Brave New World in Portsmouth. Drummer Tim Harris was out of action due to a poisoned arm and Eric Allandale filled in as the drummer. They were also set to go into the studio in October to record and it was speculated that it would be with the new singer.

Curtis would move to the United States for a solo career on the club circuit, encouraged by the likes of Wilson Pickett and Sam & Dave, playing Las Vegas with the Righteous Brothers.

New lead singer

Clem Curtis' successful replacement was Colin Young. Young was born in Barbados and had previously been in a group called Joe E. Young and the Tonics who had the Soul Buster! album released in 1968. Young had joined the Foundations in late September / early October. He had been rehearsing with them for the week of 5 October and was ready to make his debut on Friday 4 October at Aberdeen University.

It had been reported in the 12 October issue of Melody Maker that the Foundations would record their next single "Build Me Up Buttercup" as soon as legal complications for the release of Joey Young (Colin Young) were sorted out with his former label, Major Minor Records. In the same issue, a member of the group mis-named Peter Gomez said that they were frustrated with playing other people's sounds. But now that Clem has left, they felt that they were able to change their sound but only gradually.

On 30 November with Young still a fledgling lead singer, the group was to do two shows on one night, the first being the Old Hill Plaza at 9 pm and then followed by the Handsworth Plaza at 11 pm.

In his early period with the Foundations, Young had to learn that he was just another group member. Other members put him in into Coventry but he eventually learnt to toe the line and was accepted by the other members.

With Young, the band would have two more big hits; "Build Me Up Buttercup", which was their third big hit in January 1969 and "In the Bad Bad Old Days (Before You Loved Me)" which was a hit in April 1969.

"Build Me Up Buttercup"

On the week of 30 November 1968, "Build Me Up Buttercup" made its debut in the Disc and Music Echo Top 30 chart at no. 25. Spending 15 weeks in the UK chart, it would get to the peak position of no. 2. Making its debut at no. 84 in the US, on the Billboard Hot 100 for the week ending 4 January 1969, it would reach the peak position of no. 3 on the week ending 22 February 1969. It held that position for another two weeks.

Two members of the band, McBeth and Gomez were pictured with Tom Jones in the 1 March 1969 issue of Melody Maker, where Tom Jones was giving the band a gold disc at Elstree Studios where they appeared on his show.

=== 1969 ===
"In the Bad Bad Old Days"

The song was released on Friday, 28 February. It received a positive review by Chris Welch with a cautionary warning for the listeners to look out for their neck from excessive jerking. "In the Bad Bad Old Days" made its debut in the Billboard Hot 100 at no. 77 for the week ending 5 April 1969. It would get to no. 8 in the UK and no. 51 in the US. It also reached No. 23 in Canada on 5 May that year.

Further activities in 1969

The Foundations were scheduled to appear on the Tom Jones Show on 9 March 1969.

When "In the Bad Bad Old Days" was in the Melody Maker Pop 30 chart at no. 16 on the Week of 26 March, the bass player was interviewed. He said that the group wanted to have two albums out that year. The second album would be done after coming back from their US tour. He said that several months prior, they had written some songs for a freaky type of LP. He also said that if they played underground-type numbers in the US, people would listen but he was unsure about back home in the UK, how it would be received. Around that time they had been asked by John Carter-Davies, a Texas oil millionaire to play at a 21st birthday party for his son, David.

When they were on tour with Stevie Wonder, they had success with a ballad they performed. This prompted them to consider releasing a Macaulay / Macleod ballad. According to Melody Maker in the 29 March issue, tentatively titled, "No Place on Earth Could Find Him" (later referred to as "No Place on Earth Could Find You").

At the height of their popularity, the Foundations' management were in negotiations with a UK TV company for a television series that would star members of the band. They had turned down a number of offers to appear in films because of script unsuitability.

It was noted by NME in the 19 April issue that the group had just finished a tour with Stevie Wonder and were completing their third album. They were also on their way to the US for their second major tour and had expectations of recording in Detroit. They were in the NME Top Five that week as well. The group's publicist Rod Harrod was interviewed by New Musical Express about the Foundation's US tour. The interview was published in the magazine's 17 May issue. At the time the group was halfway through their tour, and the lineup was Peter Macbeth, Eric Allandale, Tony Gomez, Tim Harris, Alan Warner, Pat Burke and Colin Young. The show they played at the Filmore was opened by the Savoy Brown Blues Band and was closed by the Paul Butterfield Blues Band. The group knew what kind of audience they would be playing to.

It was reported in the 26 April issue of New Musical Express that the group had earlier considered calling off their United States tour due to a union ban preventing them from being televised there. Weeks later, it still had not been resolved but there were hopes that it would while they were still on tour.

They were preparing for their second appearance at the Filmore when they had a phone call from the manager of the Copa club. He informed them that a couple of members of the Temptations had been taken unwell and asked if the Foundations could step in for the night. Not knowing that the group played their own instruments, he asked them to go immediately to rehearse with the house orchestra. The group made history of sorts by becoming the first act to play as a band there as well as playing in clothes other than the suit types. They also broke new ground by being the first "self-contained group" and first "rock group" to play there. The group also did well by earning a week's worth of pay in one night. They had also secured a booking for when they were on their next tour in next November / October. They also played at the Cheetah which earned them $14,000 for just one night. According to Cash Box in the 3 May 1969, issue, things had seemingly gone well for the group with their playing the Copa club and the magazine wrote that Kip Cohen the Filmore manager had given them a release to do the show there. However the following week, Cash Box corrected things and said that the Foundations leaving Filmore was not amicable. According to a spokesman for Filmore, the group asked permission to leave to play at the Copa club, and it was denied. So, they decided to leave anyway.

They had been booked to play at a club in Dayton, Ohio. At the time of booking, the manager had not realized that they were a multi-racial group and was not going to let them go on. However, he changed his mind. The group had planned to do a week's worth of recording at Motown Studios but could not get a recording permit so that was cancelled. So they instead were booked in for a week's worth cabaret work in Detroit. They were also to do a week in Toronto. Publicist Harrod wondered why they never received requests to play in Canada. He noted that there was another group in Canada that went by the same name.

After their return from their time in the US at the end of May, the group were set to appear at the Bratislava Song Festival in Czechoslovakia.

It had been reported in the 7 June issue of Melody Maker that the Foundations were in a row with their record label (Pye) and producer due to five tracks from their upcoming album, From the Foundations having been leaked to other artists. According to the group, the songs were supposed to be exclusive to them. The group were holding off on the release of their album until September. They discovered that the songs were going to be released by other artists. One of the "exclusive" songs to be released on single was "My Little Chickadee" which had been covered by Geno Washington the same time as The Foundations' version was released on the UNI label in the US. The group's manager Barry Class was due to meet with Pye chief, Louis Benjamin when the article went to press.

Also, in early June the Foundations issued an injunction against Clem Curtis's group, Clem Curtis and The New Foundations who were touted as alternative attraction when the Foundations had to leave the United States a week early when their booking for a week at a Detroit cabaret was cancelled.

It was reported in the 21 June 1969 issue of Cash Box that the group was planning to record a live gospel album inside a church. According to their publicity manager, Rod Harrod, the group was inspired by the success that the Edwin Hawkins Singers had with "Oh Happy Day". The article also mentioned the new artistic freedom the group had as a result of a recent deal that Pye chief Louis Benjamin had negotiated.

As of 5 July, the entities under the umbrella of Class International that handled aspects of The Foundations career were, Class Managements - exclusive management handled by Barry Class; First Class Agency - sole agents, handled by Jim Dawson; Top Class Music - joint publishers handled by Sleeping Bunny; Five Minute Films - promotional films handled by Sylvia Class and Overlord Publicity, worldwide press and publication handled by Rod Harrod.

In the 5 July issue of Billboard it was reported that Barry Class had negotiated a new contract for the group with Pye. It was also noted that the group would take charge of producing their own material. Tony Gomez was interviewed by Ian Middleton of Record Mirror for the 2 August issue. In reply to Middleton's question about the group changing musical direction, he said, "We've changed it some already". He also said "We all think the same musically". And he mentioned that they had split from Tony Macaulay because things got stale.

Digging the Foundations

When their album, Digging the Foundations was released, it containined twelve tracks, half of them were original compositions by the band members. The album cover showed the band members in prison garb, ball and chain with shovels and picks. An ad in the 26 April issue of Billboard said that it was due for release in the US shortly. It received a track-by-track review in the 5 July issue of Disc and Music Echo.

Five of the eleven songs composed by Tony Macaulay and John Macleod. One song "Waiting on the Shores of Nowhere" was composed by Robert Saker and Jack Winsley. The remaining five were original compositions by the band members. A song from the album, "I Can Feel It", an Eric Allandale composition was covered by Chuck Bennett. It was a hit for him in Germany the following year. Mac Kissoon also covered the song which was included on his Souled Out album, released the same year. Another song from the album, "Solomon Grundy" also composed by Allandale had been covered by Danny Diaz & the Checkmates as well as Pickettywitch.

Due to South African authorities not allowing mixed groups to be seen, the album had to be issued there in a plain cover.

Further activities in 1969

In mid-'69, the group was approached to record music for two films. One was Take a Girl Like You which starred Hayley Mills and the other, The Games starring Stanley Baker. Also on Friday 19 July, the group's van was being unloaded in Birmingham and Alan Warner's Fender Stratocaster was stolen. Due to the theft, the group had to delay the recording of the B side to their single, "Born to Live, Born to Die". This in turn delayed the release of the single by a week. The new release date was set for 8 August.

It was reported by The New Musical Express in 9 August issue that the Foundations were planning a rock-musical pantomime. It was supposed to be based on Snow White and the Seven Dwarfs. There was a plan to use a colored actress to play snow white. Parts were also to be played by members of the band. They were allegedly working on music for the presentation and if a suitable theater could be found then it could go ahead. The group's aspirations were to have it done in the style of Hair. There had also been some dialogue with a major film company for a film release which would depend on the success of the musical.

The group were going to spend ten days from the beginning of October to film their musical contribution to Take a Girl Like You.

They were to undertake an English tour with Chuck Berry that was to commence on 27 September. There was also hope to have Creedence Clearwater Revival added as well. It was cancelled due to the promoters dropping Berry. Due to Creedence Clearwater Revival being unavailable and no other suitable top acts being found, it was all cancelled. The Foundations however were planning to tour the UK in early 1970.

The group also had a tentative booking for an Australian tour at Christmas time.

The Foundations were at no. 1 in the Top Male Vocal Group category, and "Build Me Up Buttercup" was no. 10 in the Top Record category in the 16 August issue of Record World.

"Born to Live, Born to Die"

With "Born to Live, Born to Die" ready to hit the record store shelves the following day, was reviewed by Penny Valentine for the 9 August issue of Disc and Music Echo. She began by saying that she liked all things Foundations because of their tight identifiable sounds but she said she was a little weary of this record. There was a lot of things happening in the background that made her uneasy and didn't seem to gel. She also said at the beginning they sounded a lot like Mike d'Abo. She also admitted that the chorus was amazingly catchy, but she felt that the group had been given too much of a free hand. The single was one of the singles in the Special Merit Spotlight section of the 13 September issue of Billboard. The reviewer gave it a possibility of getting into the Hot 100 and that it would surpass their recent hit "My Little Chickadee". It was reviewed by Cash Box in the 13 September issue in the magazine's Picks of the Week section. The improved production quality was noted. There was a possibility of heavy sales if FM would pick up on it. The reviewer also said that it was one of the strongest Foundations singles since their last resurge into the Top 40.

On the week of September 13, Record Mirror showed the entry of "Born to Live Born to Die" in the National Top 50 charts at no. 46. Billboard reported in the 27 September issue that in Canada, Phonodisc was ahead of other countries with its rush release of "Born to Live, Born to Die". Heavy promotion for it was expected when the band would start their cross-country tour of universities commencing on 16 October. On the week ending 27 September, it had dropped down to no. 50 in the UK. The 4 October issue showed that the single was back at no. 46. It was also in the Malaysian Top Ten having moved from no. 11 to no. 8. The peak position of no. 4 in the Malaysian chart was shown in the 25 October issue of Billboard. It was still in the Top Ten a week later. Breakout sales action for Canada was reported by Cash Box in the 18 October issue. It would be listed as one of the best-selling singles from Pye in the 4 July 1970 issue.

Further activities in late 1969

A selection of lower priced records were listed in the 18 October issue of New Musical Express. Among them was the self-titled Foundations album on Marble Arch MALS 1157. It featured stereo re-recordings of previously recorded songs. The songs "Any Old Time (Your'e Lonely And Sad)", "Back on My Feet Again", "Harlem Shuffle", "Tomorrow" and "We Are Happy People" appeared on the Rocking the Foundations album released the previous year. "Baby Now That I've Found You" with Colin Young on vocals has the same backing track as the original Clem Curtis version. The new version of "Tomorrow" years later has been referred to as the alternate version. This version has Colin Young on vocals instead of Clem Curtis' vocals which appeared on the live version. They too have the same backing track. However, the Colin Young re-recording is a longer edit. It was originally on the Rocking the Foundations album which was a mixture of actual live and studio tracks. This suggests that there were some recordings with Clem Curtis on lead vocals existed but his vocals were replaced with those by Colin Young.

Bassist Peter Macbeth left the band in 1969 to join the group Bubastis with Bernie Living. Over time, other members included Geoff Nicholson and Brian Appleyard from East of Eden, Simon Lee from Alexis Korner, and soul sax player Mike Freeman.

An article appeared in the 20 September issue of New Musical Express that the new single for the group was "Love Song" which was written for the group by Donovan. The group cut short their Dutch tour so they could go back to London to record that song plus the Bill Martin and Phil Coulter composition "Take a Girl Like You" on 8 October. It was also reported in the same article that their rock opera that was planned for Christmas had to be shelved.

The absence of the group in Sweden caused concern to their management in late September. They were reported missing. At the time there were heavy storms in Sweden that resulted in injuries and deaths. Rod Harrod, spokesman for the group said that management was very worried. The group's agent was flying out to investigate.

According to the Seventies Sevens website, the 5 November 1969 issue of Record Retailer reported that David Myers and John Worsley who were songwriters with Southern Music left to Join Barry Class' Trend label that year. They composed "Baby, I Couldn't See" which The Foundations recorded. Eric Allendale who had been taken on as a producer for Trend in 1968 co-directed the recording with Worsley. Backed with Colin Young's composition "Penny Sir", it was released on single, Pye 7N 17849 in 1969. It became a minor hit in Holland, making it on to the Dutch Tipparade chart, where it peaked at no. 8 on week three.

Steve Bingham would assume of the role of Foundations bass guitarist in 1969.

=== 1970 ===
Break away from management and legal action

It had been reported in a publicity sheet around early December 1969 that the band had broken away from their manager Barry Class. Jim Dawson who was formerly their agent and Mike Dolan took over the group's affairs. Having left Barry Class's management, the group had joined a management company headed by Mike Dolan of Marquee-Martin and Jim Dawson. Barry Class took legal action against the group. Class was granted temporary injunctions by High Court Judge McGarry to restrain Dawson from disposing of any documents relating to the group. Also, with contracts negotiated prior to 28 Nov. 1969 (the day of contract breach), a percentage of money was to go to Class. The article in the 3 January 1970 issue of Billboard also mentioned that the group's royalties had been frozen. Dawson was also ordered to return any documents belonging to Class.

Further activities

The single "Take a Girl Like You" was released in February, 1970. An article appeared in the 21 March issue of Record Mirror when their current single was "Take a Girl Like You". The article told of the group's frustration with the material they were performing live and the teen scene they were having play on. With disgust, Colin Young explained that they were having to perform the same music on stage for the last two years which he felt was getting stale. One of the few songs they were performing that was not one of their hits was the song "Help Me" by Sonny Boy Williamson. At the time of the article, the line-up was given as Eric Allandale, Steve Bingham, Pat Burke, Tony Gomez, Tim Harris, Alan Warner and Colin Young. The group was also leaning towards a more progressive sound.

It appears that the Foundations were in Pye Studios around the second quarter of 1970. According to the May 1970 issue of Beat Instrumental, the group had been in the studios to lay down some tracks.

"My Little Chickadee" proved to be the band's last hit. In spite of releasing "Take a Girl Like You", the title song to the Oliver Reed and Hayley Mills film of the same name, and a heavy blues rock song "I'm Gonna Be a Rich Man", which was one of the few songs that Steve Bingham played on.

On 6 August, a broadcast showed the band's appearance on Top of the Pops performing "I'm Gonna Be a Rich Man".

According to Disc and Music Echo in the magazine's 5 September issue, The Foundations were appearing with Miki Antony on Ed Stewart's Stewpot show on Saturday at 5:15 pm.

Departure of Colin Young and break up

It was reported by New Musical Express in the week ending 10 October 1970 issue that lead singer Colin Young had left the group to pursue a solo career. He had already signed a contract with Barry Class and was putting together his new group which was called Development. Young would later claim that the rest of the band had got above themselves, the band hardly rehearsing, staying in the biggest most expensive hotels in the US and some members failing to turn up for bookings.

The Foundations split in late 1970.

During their time, the group took on bassists, Tony Collinge (possibly joined when the group left Barry Class in 1969), Paul Lockey (in 1970) who had been with Robert Plant in Band of Joy.

== Other versions of band ==
=== Late 1970 to the end of the 1970s ===
Colin Young and Development

Since late 1970, Barry Class attempted to have the Foundations name revived. The band had Graham Preskett as the musical director and on electric violin and guitar. Other members Jean Roussel on keys and Roger Cawkwell on sax and flute and Colin Young on vocals. The group had an agreement with management that they would appear as The Foundations but between gigs Colin Young would explain that they were becoming a new outfit called Development. They toured throughout Latin America and even played at the Expo-Show in Buenos Aires. They continued though to early 1971. According to a later article in Disc and Music Echo, Development aka The Foundations did remarkably well in Latin America.

In 1971, Colin Young also had a single, "Any Time at All" bw "You're No Good" released on Trend 6099 005. It was produced by Tony Rockliff and Barry Class. It was credited to Colin Young introducing Development. It was also released on Uni 55286. A Hot 100 prediction, it was in Billboard's Top 60 Pop Spotlight section for the week ending 5 June 1971.

The last record released in the early 1970s period credited to "The Foundations" was a single "Stoney Ground" b/w "I'll Give You Love" MCA MCA 5075 in 1971. The composers were actually Conan Byrne and Warren Davis of the Warren Davis Monday Band fame. Davis had tried out for the role of Foundations' lead singer in 1968. For the week of 29 January 1972 along with releases by Santana, Rod Stewart, The Hillside Singers and BJ Thomas etc., the song was on the pop section of the Cash Box Juke Box Programming Guide. For the week ending 26 February, the single made its debut on the Billboard Bubbling Under the Hot 100 chart. Charting for a week, it peaked at no. 113.

As reported in the 4 March 1972 issue of Disc and Music Echo, Development, Colin Young's group was alternating between that name and The Foundations when gigging around the UK. They were looking to release their first album the following month. Colin Young had an album released on the Stateside label, In the Beginning and credited to Colin Young's Development. The musicians on the album included Graham Preskett on violin, guitar, banjo, harmonica, melodica, Steve Bingham on bass, Roger Cawkwell on flute, recorder and saxophones, Jean Roussel on organ and piano and Eddie "Tan Tan" Thornton on trombone and trumpet etc.

Others

There would be two more singles released credited to "The Foundations" in the late 1970s.

When Curtis returned to the UK, he formed a new version of the group with little success in spite of releasing several singles, but later had a lucrative spell on the 1960s nostalgia circuit.

June 1972 to December 1972. Re-formed members would included Bill Springate on Guitar, John Springate on Vocal, Derek "Del" Watson on Bass (1st Feb 1948 died 29 Sept 2008), Paul Wilmot on Drums (14th Sept 1947 died 24th June 2010) (all members of the band Elegy). Their last performance was The South Pier Pavilion, Lowestoft, Suffolk.

Roy Carter who later on joined Heatwave.

According to an article about Brian Johnston of the White Plains on the White Plains Chronicles website, there is information provided by James Payne that gives a partial line-up of a 1973 version of the Foundations. Listed were Clem Curtis on vocals, Eric Allandale on trombone, Brian Johnston on keyboards and Jim Payne on drums.

In the mid-1970s, while Clem Curtis and the Foundations were on the road, there was also another Foundations line-up that was led by Colin Young who were touring at the same time, and were playing basically the same material. This eventually led to court action which resulted in Curtis being allowed to bill his group as either the Foundations or Clem Curtis & the Foundations. Young was allowed to bill himself as "The New Foundations", or as "Colin Young & the New Foundations". The New Foundations name was previously used for the Australian release of "Build Me Up Buttercup" on Astor AP-1567 in 1969.

In 1975, Young and his group, The New Foundations, released a lone single on "Something for My Baby" / "I Need Your Love" on Pye 45533. Also in the same period, another group, also called New Foundations released a soul ballad single, "Darling (You're All I Need)" on Atlantic 45-3225. This New Foundations was a group from the United States who were produced by George Kerr.

The Clem Curtis led Foundations were competitors in the Eurovision 1977 with "Where Were You When I Needed Your Love?". They were picked to be winners but due to a strike by electricians, they were not televised. A small ad appeared on the bottom of page 55 of the 26 March issue of Music Week. It said, "If you missed Eurovision on TV watch CRACKERJACK this Friday FOUNDATIONS "Where Were You When I Needed Your Love". Also that month, "Where Were You When I Needed Your Love" was being played on Radio Tees and David Hoare had it as a hit pick. Backed with "Love Me Nice and Easy", it was released on Summit SU 100 in 1977.

In 1978, there was another single credited to The Foundations. It was "Closer to Loving You" b/w "Change My Life" released on Psycho P2603. Over the years the B side "Change My Life" gained popularity among Northern soul fans. It appears on the Fab-U-Lus Northern Soul 10" LP album compilation.

=== 1980s to 1990s ===
In 1984, Clem Curtis & The Foundations recorded a version of "On Broadway" that was released on the IDM label that year. Charting in the UK, it debuted in the IPA Airplay Top 10 on 1 September at no. 3 and was at no. 5 on the 29 of that month.

In the early 1990s, an album of re-recordings was released. It featured Clem Curtis on lead vocals, Alan Warner on guitar, Vince Cross on keyboards and Andy Bennett on drums. The recordings were arranged and produced by Keith Bateman. Released on Double Play GRF176, it included the old hits plus new tracks, "You Can't Fool Me", "Knock On Wood", "No-One Loves Me Like You Do", "Together", "Love You Now", "Sitting On The Dock Of The Bay" and "Loving You".

There was another line-up formed in 1999 that included Colin Young (vocals), Alan Warner (Guitar), Steve Bingham (bass), Gary Moberly (keyboards), Tony Laidlaw (sax) and Sam Kelly then Steve Dixon (drums). This version of the group was re-formed due to the popularity of the film There's Something About Mary, and the interest created resulting from the 1968 hit "Build Me Up Buttercup" being featured in the film. Some time later, Young left this version of the group and was replaced by Hue Montgomery (aka Hugh Montgomery).

=== 2000s ===
As of April 2024, the line up of the re-created Foundations group is Hubert Montgomery on lead vocals, Alan Warner on guitar and vocals, John Dee on bass guitar, Dave Lennox on keyboards, Pete Stroud on drums, and Nick Payn on saxophone.

- Various sources have erroneously stated that there was an early 1970s English line-up that had nothing, or little to do with the original Foundations. However, Curtis had been leading a new line-up of the Foundations since coming back to the UK and re-forming the group in the early 1970s.

== Outside the Foundations ==
Following the touring with the Foundations and the fatigue that went with it, Alan Warner was happy to settle down and spend time with his wife and daughter and had moved into their home in Edgware, NW London. Answering an ad, he joined a band which had already been formed, the rock group Pluto. The line up also included Paul Gardner, Derek Jarvis and Michael Worth. They recorded an album which was released on the Dawn label, a subsidiary of Pye. The band also released a single, "Rag a Bone Joe" and "Stealing My Thunder" in October 1971. They followed up with a single "I Really Want It" and " Something That You Loved" in 1972.

In the 1970s, there would be a collaborative attempt between two former members of the Foundations. Original Foundations trombonist Eric Allandale attempted to work with original Foundations drummer Tim Harris.

In 1975, Clem Curtis recorded a disco version of "Unchained Melody" which spent three weeks in the Record Mirror UK Disco Chart, peaking at no. 75. In 2005, he recorded the single "Stuck in a Wind Up" which was credited to Lord Large feat. Clem Curtis. Years later, spending a week in the iTunes chart, it peaked at no. 54 on 3 April 2022.

== Later years ==
By April 1979, the Flashback label had reissued "Baby, Now that I've Found You" and "Build Me Up Buttercup" back to back on single, cat FBS 6.

Raymond Morrison later had some success as part of a duo called Ram & Tam. He died on 24 February 2013.

Clem Curtis died on 27 March 2017 at age 76, from lung cancer.

Guitarist Alan Warner was interviewed by Strange Brew in 2022. He was talking about the group's relationship with Tony Macaulay. He also talked about the members and made a reference to Mike Elliott where he said, "The oldest guy in the band he was about forty". He then said "Funny enough I found out the other day, that he's still around. He celebrated his 90th ... or ninety something birthday the other day, I couldn't believe it!"

In September 2023, music label London Calling released the Live on Air CD which brought together the tracks the band recorded for the Top of the Pops radio show.

Hue Montgomery was also one half of the vocal-duo Soul Providers with Chris Maden, appearing at venues such as the opening of the Dovecote Barn in 2019. Robin posted on Facebook on 17 August 2026 that he had been informed that his musical duo partner of fifteen years, Hue Montgomery had died that morning.

== Former personnel ==
=== The Foundations ===
- Clem Curtis: lead vocals – born 28 November 1940, Trinidad, West Indies – d. 27 March 2017 – (1966–1968)
- Alan Warner: lead guitar – b. 21 April 1947, Paddington, west London – (1966–1970)
- Peter Macbeth: bass guitar – b. Peter McGrath, 2 February 1941, Marylebone, North London – (1966–1969)
- Tim Harris: drums – b. 14 January 1948, St John's Wood, North London – d. October 27th, 2007 – (1966–1970)
- Tony Gomez: keyboards – b. 13 December 1948, Colombo, Ceylon – (now Sri Lanka) – d. 19 December 2015 – (1966–1970)
- Pat Burke: tenor saxophone/flute – b. 9 October 1937, Kingston, Jamaica, West Indies – (1966–1970)
- Mike Elliot: tenor saxophone – b. 6 August 1929, Jamaica, West Indies (1966–1968)
- Eric Allandale: trombone – b. Eric Allandale Dubuisson, 4 March 1936, Dominica, West Indies – died 23 August 2001 – (1966–1970)
- Arthur Brown: vocals - b. 24 June 1942, Whitby, Yorkshire, – (early–mid 1967)
- Colin Young: lead vocals - b. 12 September 1944, Barbados, West Indies - replaced Clem Curtis in 1968 – (1968–1970)
- Tony Collinge : bass guitar – b. 4 February 1947, Selly Park, Birmingham – (1969)
- Steve Bingham: bass guitar – b. 4 April 1949, Solihull, Warwickshire – (1969–1970)
- Paul Lockey: bass guitar – joined in 1970 for nine months. – (1970)

=== Guests ===
- Mike D'Abo: piano – b. Michael David D'Abo, 1 March 1944, Betchworth, Surrey. Co-wrote and guested on "Build Me Up Buttercup" contributing piano.
- John Mcleod: piano

== Discography ==
Summary of single releases

From the band's beginning to their breakup towards the end of 1970, the Foundations released ten singles in the United Kingdom including two versions of the same song. The majority of the singles were composed by Tony Macaulay and John Macleod. They had four significant hits from these plus a minor hit with one of their own compositions, "Born to Live, Born to Die". They had minor hit with "My Little Chickadee" in the United States. This was written by Tony Macaulay and John Macleod. There were other titles announced that were either never recorded or were never released. They were "Our Love Went Thataway", "Tear Jerker, Music-worker, You" which was to be released around the same time as "Better By Far" by Lulu and "No Place On Earth Could Find You". In 1971, the single "Stoney Ground" was released. It is believed that this single was actually by Colin Young and his new backing band Development. It seems quite likely as the Colin Young and Development debut single "Any Time at All" pre-dates "Stoney Ground". In the mid and late 1970s, there were two more singles released under the Foundations’ name. They were "Where Were You When I Needed Your Love?" and "Closer to Loving You" which featured the Northern Soul classic "Change My Life" as the B side. These last two singles to bear the Foundations’ name featured Clem Curtis once more as the lead vocalist.

Summary of album releases

During the 1960s, the Foundations recorded and released four LPs in the United Kingdom. Before the release of their debut album, it was originally announced in the October 1967, by Beat Instrumental Monthly, that the debut album's title was to be Sound Basis. However, when it was released on Pye, it had the title of From the Foundations. The American version of this album, on the Uni label, was given the title of Baby, Now That I've Found You. This album featured Curtis on lead vocals. The next release was in 1968. It was a live LP called Rocking the Foundations, and also featured Curtis on lead vocals, plus two instrumentals – "The Look of Love" and "Coming Home Baby". Also in 1968, another LP was released, this time on the Marble Arch label. This self-titled third album featured re-recordings of their previous hits and songs, but with Young on vocals instead of Curtis. It also featured a version of a new track, "Build Me Up Buttercup". There was also a second American album released called Build Me Up Buttercup. This was a compilation of Foundations tracks. Side one consisted of tracks from their Rocking the Foundations album, while side two consisted of "Build Me Up Buttercup", the B side of that single, plus some earlier Foundations tracks. The group's last LP release was Digging The Foundations in 1969, which featured their hit "In the Bad Bad Old Days", "I Can Feel It", "That Same Old Feeling" and the minor US hit "My Little Chickadee". A track "Why Does She Keep On" that was mentioned in the 26 April 1969 issue of Billboard magazine was not included. Since then, there have been various compilations of the Foundations songs, released on both the Golden Hour and PRT labels.

=== UK original albums ===
- From the Foundations (Pye NSPL 18206, 1967)
- Rocking the Foundations (Pye NSPL 18227, 1968) – live album
- Digging the Foundations (Pye NSPL 18290, 1969)

=== UK compilation albums ===
- The Foundations (Marble Arch MALS 1157–1968)
- Golden Hour of the Foundations (GH 574, 1973)
- Back to the Beat (PRT DOW7, 1983)
- Best Of (PRT PYL 4003–1987)

UK EPs 7"

- "It's All Right" (Pye NEP24297, 1968)
- "Mini Monster" (Pye PMM.103)

UK EPs 12"

- "Baby, Now That I've Found You" (Pye Big Deal BD 107) – 4 tracks
- "Baby, Now That I've Found You" (PRT Pyt 24, 1989) – 3 tracks including remix

UK CDs

- Golden Hour of the Foundations (Knight Records KGH CD 104, 1990)
- Strong Foundations – The Singles and More (Music Club – MCCD 327, 1997)
- Build Me Up Buttercup (Castle Select SELCD 527, 1998)
- Baby, Now That I've Found You (Sequel Records – NEECD 300, 1999)
- Build Me Up Buttercup (The Complete Pye Collection) (Castle, 2004)
- Live on Air

=== US albums ===
- Baby Now That I've Found You (Uni 3016 (Mono)/73016 (Stereo), 1967)
- Build Me Up Buttercup (Uni 73043, 1968) – US No. 92
- Digging the Foundations (Uni 73058, 1969)
- The Very Best Of (Varèse Sarabande 74648, 2017)

=== Singles ===
List of singles, with selected peak chart positions and certifications
Year	Title	Peak chart positions								Certifications
Year	Title	UK	AUS	CAN	IRE	NLD	NZ	US Hot 100	US R&B	Certifications
1967	"Baby, Now That I've Found You"	1	21	1	3	13	16	11	33	
1968	"Back on My Feet Again"	18	—	29	18	32	—	59	—	
1968	"Any Old Time (You're Lonely and Sad)"	48	—	—	—	—	20	—	—	
1968	"Build Me Up Buttercup"	2	1	1	3	12	4	3	—	BPI: 2× Platinum
1969	"In the Bad, Bad Old Days (Before You Loved Me)"	8	—	23	7	—	20	51	—	
1969	"Born to Live, Born to Die"	46	—	—	—	—	—	—	—	
1969	"My Little Chickadee"	—	—	68	—	—	—	99	—	
1969	"Baby, I Couldn't See"	—	—	—	—	—	—	—	—	
1970	"Take a Girl Like You"	—	—	—	—	—	—	—	—	
1970	"I'm Gonna Be a Rich Man"	—	—	—	—	—	—	—	—	
1971	"Stoney Ground"	—	—	—	—	—	—	—	—	
1977	"Where Were You When I Needed Your Love?"	—	—	—	—	—	—	—	—	
1978	"Closer to Loving You"	—	—	—	—	—	—	—	—	
1998	"Build Me Up Buttercup" (UK re-release)	71	—	—	—	—	—	—	—	
"—" denotes releases that did not chart or were not released in that territory.

== Line ups ==
=== The Foundations ===
1966–1968

- Eric Allandale
- Arthur Brown
- Pat Burke
- Clem Curtis
- Mike Elliott
- Tony Gomez
- Tim Harris
- Peter MacBeth
- Alan Warner

1968–1970

- Eric Allandale
- Steve Bingham
- Pat Burke
- Tony Collinge
- Tony Gomez
- Tim Harris
- Peter MacBeth
- Alan Warner
- Colin Young

1970–1970

- Eric Allandale
- Steve Bingham
- Pat Burke
- Tony Gomez
- Tim Harris
- Paul Lockey
- Alan Warner
- Colin Young

1993

- Clem Curtis
- Alan Warner
- Vince Cross
- Andy Bennett
