= From the Foundations =

Studio album by the Foundations
- Released: November 1967
- Length: 29:50
- Label: Pye

The Foundations chronology
From the Foundations (1967)	Rocking the Foundations (1968)

From the Foundations is the debut album by the English soul group the Foundations, released in November 1967 by Pye Records. It contains their hit, "Baby Now That I've Found You".

== Background ==
According to Foundations guitarist Alan Warner, the album was made up of tracks that the Foundations recorded at their audition and some new songs. He also said that the group never had a chance to listen to it before it was released.

The album was described in the 25 November, 1967 issue of Melody Maker as being half soul and discotheque music that the group really liked to play, and the other half, their single sound. Tony Macaulay said "Half of their music contains beat and a raucous sound, the other is good, strong melody". He also said that sales-wise it would sell to people who liked both.

Announcing the album's arrival, the front page of New Musical Express said "New LPs by Foundations and Jimi Hendrix". The album, From the Foundations was released on Pye NPL 1820. The same issue showed that "Baby, Now That I've Found You" was at No. 1 in the NME Top 30 chart (Wednesday, November 22, 1967).

The album was released in the United States on Uni 73016, and in Australia on Astor SPLP 1237. In South Africa it was released on Pye PL 2129. The cover was blurred so buyers couldn't see the band. The reason for this is clearer with a later release by The Foundations. The South African authorities didn't allow multi-racial groups to be seen.

== Critical reception ==
The album was reviewed by Nick Logan in the 25 November issue of New Musical Express. Logan had joined Tony Macaulay and John Macleod for a pre-hear of the album that was to be released on the Friday that week. They listened to it on an old record player rather than the studio's record player so that they could gauge how it would sound to the average record buying customer. Logan said that the first three songs were of the discotheque feel and nothing like the weak copy of the soul sound that the Foundations' detractors would have people believe. All of the tracks were commented on. The songs "Show Me", a Joe Tex composition, "Jerking the Dog", a Rufus Thomas song and "A Whole New Thing", a song the band performed live were the songs with the discotheque feel. "Hold Me A Little While Longer" which used a double-tracked piano was composed by Barbara Ruskin. The song "I Can Take or Leave Your Loving" was mentioned as Tony Macaulay's favorite track.

The 2 December issue of Record Mirror was positive. The reviewer started off with saying how it can be a gamble in Britain to bring out an album on the strength of a single, even a number one. He said that the band's talent came over quite well and the album was a happy sound. He also said that for those who dug sax-based backings, plentiful organ and a similar tempo throughout, then they would like it.

A review in the 2 December issue of Disc and Music Echo said that the album was perfectly timed to cash in on the success of the single. The reviewer confirmed Chris Denning's statement that the band captured the Detroit sound.

Released in the US as Baby, Now that I've Found You on Uni 73016, it had a brief review in the 10 February, 1968 issue of Record World. The reviewer said that the group first clicked in the US with "Baby, Now that I've Found You" and the re-did that ditty and added other popular and new tunes to the album. Songs mentioned were "I Can Take or Leave Your Loving", "Call Me" and "Show Me".

The album was one of the Pop Picks in the 10 February issue of Cash Box. Mentioning "Baby, Now That I've Found You" as the song to spark the set, it was also said that the group would get a slice of the sales pie with this LP and it was well worth listening to. Good action was predicted for the album. Besides the hit song, two other tracks singled out for mention were "Mr. Personality Man and "I Can Take or Leave Your Loving".

The album was given 3½ stars by AllMusic.

== Re-release ==
The album was re-released on Culture Factory CFU01212 in October 2022 with the vinyl in an orange smoke design.

== Track listing ==
Side A
No.	Title	Length
1.	"Baby, Now That I've Found You"	2:36
2.	"I Can Take or Leave Your Loving"	2:17
3.	"Hold Me Just a Little While Longer"	2:28
4.	"Come On Back to Me"	2:16
5.	"Love Is a Five Letter Word"	4:16
6.	"Call Me"	2:27

Side B
No.	Title	Length
1.	"Show Me"	2:53
2.	"Jerking the Dog"	3:00
3.	"A Whole New Thing"	2:53
4.	"The Writing's on the Wall"	2:16
5.	"Mr. Personality Man"	2:28
Total length:		29:50

== Charts ==
Chart performance for From the Foundations
Chart (1968)	Peak position
German Albums (Offizielle Top 100)	34
