= Build Me Up Buttercup (album) =

Studio album by The Foundations
- Released: 1968
- Label: UNI 73043
- Producer: Tony Macaulay

Build Me Up Buttercup is an album by the Foundations. In addition to the title track, "Build Me Up Buttercup", it contained the band's other hits, "Back On My Feet Again" and "Any Old Time (You're Lonely and Sad)". The album was released by Uni Records in 1968 and reached the charts in various United States music trade magazines in 1969.

== Track listing ==
Side A

1. "Love Is Alight (The Horse)"
2. "People Are Funny"
3. "Harlem Shuffle"
4. "Comin' Home Baby"
5. "Tomorrow"
6. "Am I Groovin' You"

Side B

1. "Build Me Up Buttercup"
2. "New Direction"
3. "Back On My Feet Again"
4. "I Can Take or Leave Your Lovin'"
5. "Any Old Time (You're Lonely And Sad)"
6. "I'm a Whole New Thing"

The tracks on Side A were taken from the live Rocking the Foundations album that was also released in 1968.

== Charts ==
=== Billboard ===
The album made its debut at no. 196 on the Billboard TOP LP's chart for the week ending March 8, 1969. Having been in the chart for eight weeks, it peaked at no. 92 on the week ending April 26. It spent a total of eleven weeks in the chart.

=== Cash Box ===
The album debuted at no. 91 in the Cash Box Top 100 Albums chart on the week of March 15. It peaked at no. 76 on the week of April 26. It was still charting at no. 119 on the week of May 9, 1969.

=== Record world ===
It debuted at no. 100 on the Record World 100 TOP LP's chart on the week of March 22, 1969. On its seventh week, the album peaked at no. 70 on the week of May 3.

== Releases ==
The album was released on vinyl, eight track and cassette.

It was re-released in 2021 on the Culture Factory label. The re-release comes with a dual-color vinyl pressing.
