= Development (band) =

English band (1970–1972)

- Also known as: Colin Young's Development, The Founndations
- Origin: London England
- Genres: Progressive rock
- Years active: 1970 - 1972
- Labels: Trend, Stateside
- Spinoff of: The Foundations
- Past members: Steve Bingham; Roger Cawkwell; Graham Preskett; Jean Roussel; Christopher Smith; Eddie Thornton; Colin Young

Development was a progressive rock and pop band fronted by Colin Young, former lead singer of The Foundations. They were signed to Barry Class' Trend record label. The original Foundations had broken up in late 1970 and this new group would alternate between calling themselves Development and The Foundations.

== Background ==
The Foundations broke up in late 1970. None of the Foundations, Eric Allandale, Pat Burke, Tony Gomez, Tim Harris or Alan Warner came to be part of Development. The only other member from The Foundations besides Colin Young was Steve Bingham.

Since late 1970, Barry Class attempted to have the Foundations name revived. The band was fronted by Colin Young. Graham Preskett who played electric violin and guitar was the musical director. Other members Jean Roussel on keys and Roger Cawkwell on sax and flute. They had an agreement with management that they would appear as The Foundations but between gigs Colin Young would explain that they were becoming a new outfit called Development. They toured throughout Latin America and even played at the Expo-Show in Buenos Aires. They continued there though to early 1971. According to a later article in Disc and Music Echo, Development aka The Foundations did remarkably well in Latin America. Using the Foundations name to bring in the money, the group had exposure in Latin America.

== Career ==
On the week ending 10 October 1970, it was reported by New Musical Express that lead singer Colin Young had left The Foundations. He had already signed a contract with Barry Class and was putting together his new group which was called Development.

Under Rodney Harrod's and Philip Peverley's management, Development went to Argentina in early 1971. Having arrived in Argentina and portraying themselves as The Foundations, Development were pictured on the front page of the 3 January, 1971 issue of Argentine newspaper Crónica, as well as on page 2 with the accompanying article. Having arrived in Ezeiza from London, the paper made it known that the group was to perform at the Expo show. Describing the band members, including the portly appearance of organist Jean Alain Norman Hendrik Rousel, the article said that the group would be incorporating Latin rhythms into their music.

The 17 January issue Crónica ran the group's picture on page 13. It also gave the line up as Graham Donald Preskett on violin, Christopher Smith on drums Roger Cawkwell on sax and flute, Colin Young on lead vocals, Jean Alain Roussel on organ and piano and Estephen Bingham (bass). Also with them was Rodney Harrod the manager, and Philip Peverley. Juan D'Arjenzo appeared to be their technician. It was also made known that the group was changing their name to Development. A section "¿ERAN O SE HACIAN?" in the 10 February issue of Crónica mentioned the that a rumor had spread that The Foundations who were at the Expo fair were not the real Foundations.

On the 20th of February, the group were to appear at En el Provincialse and En Rosario Central and on the 24th with Tito Alberti.

In his Leorama column, Leo Vanes reviewed their performance in the 25 February issue of Crónica. It seemed that he viewed their performance as not being out of this world.

=== Single releases ===
A single "Any Time at All" bw "You're No Good" was released on Trend 6099 005. It was produced by Tony Rockliff and Barry Class. The B side was credited to Colin Young introducing Development. It was also released on Uni 55286. A Hot 100 prediction, it was in Billboard's Top 60 Pop Spotlight section for the week ending 5 June 1971.

A song "Stoney Ground" was recorded. It was composed by Conan Byrne and Warren Davis and backed with I'll Give You Love", a Colin Young composition. It's more than likely that the composer Conan Byrne is Con Byrne and Warren Davis is the Warren Davis, both of The Warren Davis Monday Band. Davis had tried out to take the place of Clem Curtis who had decided to leave The Foundations in 1968. Colin Young was the successful applicant. "Stoney Ground" would be a hit, and on the week ending February 26 1972, it debuted on the Billboard Bubbling Under the Hot 100 chart. Spending a week in the chart it peaked at no. 113. As the Colin Young & Development single "Anytime At All" was released in 1971, and the "Stoney Ground Single" single (credited to The Foundations) was released the following year, it's more than likely that Development was the group that played on the latter.

==== Further activities ====
According to the 4 March 1972 issue of Disc and Music Echo, Development was looking forward to the release of their album that month. Recounting their success in Argentina, Colin Young also said that they were hoping to get work in London so that it would be known by the public how different from The Foundations they were.

=== Album release ===
An album had been released in Italy. The album In the Beginning was released on Stateside 3C O62- 92933 in 1971. It was credited to Colin Young's Development. The musicians on the album were, Steve Bingham, Roger Cawkwell, Laurie Jerryman, Gaspar Lawal, Peter Lynch, Graham Preskett, Tim Mason, Paul Nieman, Jean Roussel, Tony Priestland, Eddie "Tan Tan" Thornton and Colin Young. According to Steve Bingham, he wasn't aware until decades later that the album had been released. A former Scotland Yard detective alerted him to it in 2022.
