= Barry Class =

Music executive

- Occupations: Real estate operator, Music store chain owner, music executive, musical director, record producer, recording studio owner
- Years active: 1960s - ?
- Known for: Managing The Foundations, World of Oz, Swegas and other groups

Barry Class is an entrepreneur, former music store chain owner, band manager, record label founder, musical director, producer and recording studio owner. His greatest success as a manager was with the soul group The Foundations. He also managed the group The World of Oz, Swegas and others.

== Background ==
Barry Class has been credited with the discovery of The Foundations. However, there are sources that say it was Ron Fairway, manager of The Ways and Means who discovered them.

Prior to venturing into band management, he ran the Disci chain of record stores. He purchased his first store in 1962. There were eleven stores. The locations included, 100 Westbourne Grove W2 5RU Bayswater, London, 23 Watford Way NW4 3JH Hendon, London, 84 The Broadway UB1 1QD Southall, London, 90 Bletchley Road, Bletchley Bletchley, Buckinghamshire and 36 High Street, Rugby CV21 3BW Rugby, Warwickshire. In addition to Disci, his Class group of companies included Trend Records, Class Destination Inc., Class Management, and Class Theatrical Agency. In later years he ran a recording studio.

== Personal life ==
Barry Class' wife is Sylvia Class. They had a daughter Tania born around 1962 and another daughter Gail born in 1968.

== Career ==
=== 1960s ===
According to the 26 April 1969 issue of Billboard, Barry Class had been hearing music daily through his record stores. Below his office was a coffee shop which had The Foundations playing. They were renting the premises from him. It's possible that the group that Class heard was The Ramong Sound which was fronted by Raymond Morrison. In August 2023, Alan Warner was interviewed by Jack Hodgins of the Australian radio station, 2NUR FM. The interview appears to suggest that Raymond Morrison was still in the group when Ron Fairway approached them. The February 4, 1967, issue of Melody Maker shows that the group (misspelt as The Ramog Sound) had a booking at the All-Star Club at 9a Artillery Passage, London E1 on Sunday, February 5, 1967. The Ramong Sound evolved into The Foundations.

Prior to getting to know and manage The Foundations, he wasn't involved in that aspect of the music business. His association with the group paid off when they had the hit "Baby, Now That I've Found You" with Clem Curtis on lead vocals.

According to Foundations guitarist Alan Warner, Rod Stewart's girlfriend, Dee Harrington, had ended up being secretary for The Foundations' management (Class) in the 1960s.

Following the success of "Baby, Now That I've Found You" there was what rock historian Roger Dopson referred to as a behind the scenes struggle. Ron Fairway was "pushed out" and his partner, Class, remained as sole manager of the group. Fairway later attempted to sue the band, with the allegation that he was wrongfully dismissed as the group's co-manager. The band said that he had resigned of his own accord. The December 2 issue of New Musical Express wrote that it was likely to be several months before the case would be heard. According to the 8 November issue of Melody Maker, Class said that it was a friction of personalities which had been going on for about four months.

By 23 December 1967, four bands under Class Management Ltd. were The Foundations, The Ways and Means, The Ranglers and Don Drake.

Class launched his Trend label in February 1968 and had entered into a deal with Associated Records. The promotional side of the business was handled by Richard Eddy who was employed by Trend and Andrew Vere of Saga Records. All of the acts that had been signed to his company Barry Class Management would have their recordings issued on the label. However, The Foundations who he managed would not have their recordings issued on the label. Prior to the February launch, Class was speculating on issuing budget records. He was pictured in the January 17, 1968, issue of Record Retailer with Saga Records executives, John Britten and Les Cook. He had also recruited Foundations trombonist Eric Allandale to come on board as a producer. Curtis Clements (Clem Curtis) was also employed as an assistant.

Class had somehow arranged for Ron Fairway's group, the Ways and Means to record for his label. It was reported by The New Musical Express in the 30 March issue that Class had been in New York that week, setting up a tour for The Foundations that was to commence on the second week of May. While there he was setting up a distribution deal for The Ways and Means for their Trend label debut, "Breaking Up a Dream".

Class became the manager for The World of Oz and they had been signed to Sparta Florida Music since February 13. 1968. With The World of Oz now in Class' stable, he and Decca Records held a party for the group and the launch of their new single at the Mayfair Bistro Club. As reported in the 18 May 1968 issue of Cash Box, in attendance were people in the music industry and celebrities. Sadly for the World of Oz, Barry Class went to the United States with The Foundations and left Michael Levi in charge of the group. The first thing Levi did was cut the publicity budget for the World of Oz. And as a result, the group missed out on getting on the Top of the Pops.

It was reported in the 6 July 1968 issue of Billboard that he had just six record shops at the time and was concentrating less on them and more on the aspects management and recording. He was also in negotiations for the set-up of office sites in Hong Kong, Singapore, Tokyo, Sydney and the U.S. West Coast. He had also set up a company, Class Destination Inc. which was an all-purpose service for overseas acts who were touring in the United States. In New York, Jim Gibbons of Town & Country Travel was named as the man who would handle travel arrangement and equipment hire. Janis Murray of Rogers & Cowan was in charge of publicity and was to run the New York branch of Class Overlord Publicity

The September 14, 1968, issue of Melody Maker wrote that Clem Curtis was leaving The Foundations. Warren Davis of the Warren Davis Monday Band was trying out for the role. Curtis said he would not leave the band until they found a replacement. The successful replacement turned out to be Colin Young. He joined the group in late September / early October. He had been rehearsing with them for the week of October 5 and was ready to make his debut on Friday October 4 at Aberdeen University.

Class produced the Macaulay, McLeod composition "Marie Take a Chance" which was recorded by Clem Curtis. The song was also arranged by Des Champ. It got a fairly good review by Derek Johnson in New Musical Express. Stu Ginsberg of GO YMCA also gave it a good review. With reviews by Record World and Cash Box, the song appeared to have good potential, and it did get airplay in the US. It was also recorded and released as a single by Almond Marzipan (Trend TNT 55) and Pinkerton’s Assorted Colours on their self-titled album.

By July 1969, Class had negotiated a new contract for The Foundations with their label Pye. This in turn gave the group more control over their material.

The 5 July 1969 issue of Disc & Music Echo reported that Class was offering top name acts a share in the chain of his record stores. In return he was to get a percentage of their royalties. There was also a guarantee that his shops would order the group's releases in larger quantities which would guarantee a continuous supply to the fans. There had been a recent abolition of price fixing on records (retail price management aka RPM). The first group that was to consider this offer was The Foundations. Dave Dee, Dozy, Beaky, Mick & Tich were also considering the offer. With the RPM restrictions out of the way, Class reduced the Foundations' album, Digging the Foundations to cost-price of 30s, and two shops in London were said to have been cleared of 600 in a day.

The Foundations recorded the song "Baby, I Couldn't See" which was composed by David Myers and John Worsley. The recording session which was a Trend Production had Class in the role as executive producer. It took place under the direction of Foundations trombonist, Eric Allendale who had been employed by Trend as a producer, and John Worsley. The single which was released in November was a hit in Holland, making the Tipparade chart. Peaking at no. 8 on the third week.

As of 13, December 1969, Class International had announced the merger of two of their organizations, First Class Agency and Planned Entertainments. The new organization was to be known as First Class Agency. The artists represented were, Consortium, Cuff-Links, Easy Beats, Shocking Blue, The Chads, The Foundations, Joyce Bond Review, Black Velvet, Blue River & The Maroons, The Greatest Show on Earth, Champion Jack Dupree, Abel Mann, Benedict Brown, Alexis Korner, Ground Hogs, Warm Dust, and Shades. Lee Allen and Del Taylor were the points of contact.

=== 1970s–1980s ===
A publicity sheet for The Foundations that had been released around late 1969 reported that the band had broken away from their manager. Jim Dawson who was formerly their agent and Mike Dolan would now be handling the group's affairs. Having broken away from Barry Class' management, the group had joined a management company headed by Mike Dolan of Marquee-Martin and Jim Dawson. Class then took legal action against The Foundations. High Court Judge McGarry had granted him temporary injunctions to restrain Dawson from disposing of any documents that related to the group. Also, with any contracts negotiated prior to Nov. 28, 1969 (the day of contract breach), a percentage of money was to go to Class. The article in the 3 January 1970 issue of Billboard also mentioned that the group's royalties had been frozen. Dawson was also ordered to return any documents belonging to Class.

In March 1970, the progressive brass-rock band Swegas signed with Barry Class. On the 20th of that month the group started their three-month tour of Europe. Coming back to England in July, they went to Tangerine Studios in Dalston to record the Child of Light album. They went back to Europe for more gigs that year. Things started to go wrong for the band in mid 1971 which included their van being written off due to an accident. When they returned from Germany, Barry Class and his agency First Class Management let them go. It was also reported that month in the 28 March issue of Record Mirror that a group of city businessmen had invested a quarter of a million pounds to buy a property that would become a music venue for progressive music concerts. The property was located approximately a mile away from Tottenham Court Road. There were also negotiations in progress for three other properties. The musical acts to appear were to be supplied by the First Class Agency. Rod Harrod, who was a publicist, was to oversee all of the venues. First Class was to bring over American acts in the summer. UK acts already lined up were Warm Dust, the Greatest Show on Earth and Black Sabbath.

The Foundations broke up around December 1970. Lead singer Colin Young had already left the band. According to the 10 October 1970 article in New Musical Express, he had left The Foundations to pursue a solo career and had signed a contract with Barry Class. Young was in the throes of forming his backing group called Development. He had left due to musical frustration.

It was reported in the December 19, 1970, issue of Record World that Class had signed a distribution with Pathé-Marconi for the distribution of Trend product in France and Italy. There were two bands that were lined up for distribution. They were Warm Dust and Swegas.

==== Reviving The Foundations name and deals in Latin America ====
Since late 1970, Barry Class was trying to have the Foundations name revived. Graham Preskett who was on electric violin and guitar was also the group's the musical director. Other members were, Jean Roussel on keys, Roger Cawkwell on sax and flute and Colin Young on vocals. The group had an agreement with the management that they would appear as The Foundations, but between gigs Colin Young would explain that they were becoming a new outfit called Development. They toured throughout Latin America and even played at the Expo-Show in Buenos Aires. They continued though to early 1971. Development (calling themselves The Foundations when needed) did remarkably well in Latin America. The success of Development included three weeks in Buenos Aires, playing to packed venues there. Then they went on to play in Uruguay. Due to this success which was noted in the 27 February 1971 issue of Cash Box, Class made a decision for his companies, Class International and Trend Records to open an office in the Argentine capital that was to open on the 4th of April. The office's purpose was to handle bookings for progressive musical acts in South America. Class had also set up South American Philips and EMI deals to push the Trend label releases there. He had also set up a deal for Trend to be pushed in the US and Canada through Uni. The first release through that deal was to be the Peace for Our Time album by Warm Dust. Working with producer, John Worsley and engineer Tony Rockliff, Class directed the session for the group's album Peace for Our Time. A tour had been set up for the group across campuses in the United States with the William Morris Agency.

Further activities

Colin Young's new single, "Any Time at All" had been released in the US on the 19th of February 1971.

According to Jazz Rock Soul, Warm Dust's album Peace for Our Time was released in August 1971.

Class entered into a unique deal with MCA Records for the single, "Stoney Ground". According to the 13 November 1971 issue of Record World, this was the first record released that year credited to The Foundations. The song was composed by Conan Byrne and Warren Davis. It's likely that the group that played on the single was Development. Colin Young's single "Anytime at All" was released on UNI 55286, while "Stoney Ground" was released on UNI 55315. The numbers show that this was a later release.

According to the 5 June 1976 issue of Billboard, Barry Class had been out of the record business since 1971. But he had set up a new label, Riverdale Records. Clem Curtis & The Foundations Ltd. recorded the single, "Make a Wish" / "Amanda" which was released on Riverdale RR 100. This was followed by "Friday Night (Pay Day !)" / "Pay Day ! (Friday Night)" by Pittons Party, released on RR 101. It was reviewed in the 12 June issue of Record Mirror & Disc. A funk vocal track, the reviewer said it had a fast exiting beat but was murkily mixed and the instrumental flip side was clearer and more percussive. It was distributed by President Records.

=== 1990s ===
In the 1990s, Class was the director of Hollywood Boulevard Studios at 6356 Hollywood Boulevard, Hollywood, 90028, CA. The studio had a multi-faceted approach to working with the artists, taking care of the audio and visual aspects of an artist's recording. The facility was ready to open for business in February or March 1993.
