= My Little Chickadee (song) =

My Little Chickadee is a song written by Tony Macaulay and John Macleod. It was a hit for The Foundations in 1969 and has been covered by Geno Washington & the Ram Jam Band and other artists.

== The Foundations version ==
"My Little Chickadee"

Single by The Foundations

from the album Digging The Foundations
- B-side: "Solomon Grundy"
- Released: 1969
- Genre: Pop
- Label: Uni (US)
- Songwriters: Tony Macaulay, John Macleod
- Producers: Tony Macaulay, John Macleod

The Foundations singles chronology
"Born to Live, Born to Die"	"My Little Chickadee"	"Take a Girl Like You"

"My Little Chickadee" was the last chart entry for The Foundations. It was a minor hit in the US in 1969. It was not released as a single in the UK.

=== Background ===
"My Little Chickadee" was part of a problem for The Foundations. It was one of five songs that were supposed to be exclusive to them but somehow things didn't turn out the way they were supposed to.

As reported in the June 7 issue of Melody Maker, The Foundations were in a row with their record label (Pye) and producer due to five tracks from their upcoming album, From the Foundations having been leaked to other artists. According to the group, the songs were supposed to be exclusive to them. The group were holding off on the release of their album until September. They discovered that the songs were going to be released by other artists. One of the "exclusive" songs to be released on single was "My Little Chickadee" which had been covered by Geno Washington the same time as The Foundations' version was released on the UNI label in the US. Barry Class, the group's manager was due to meet with Pye chief, Louis Benjamin when the article went to press.

=== Chart ===
On the week of June 21, 1969, "My Little Chickadee" debuted in the Record World 100 Top Pops chart at no. 76.

In Canada, it reached #68.

=== Releases ===
- "My Little Chickadee" / "Solomon Grundy" - Uni 55137

== Geno Washington & the Ram Jam Band version ==
Geno Washington & the Ram Jam Band recorded a version which was released on Pye 7N 17745 in 1969. It was produced by John Schroeder with the accompaniment directed by Nicky Walsh. It charted in the Netherlands.

=== Chart ===
Spending one week in the Dutch Tipparade chart, "My Little Chickadee" debuted at no. 20 before dropping off the following week.

== Other versions ==
A version of the song was recorded by an Australian group, The Love Machine, which was a studio band put together by producer Pat Aulton.
