= Stoney Ground (song) =

Song by The Foundations
- A-side: "Stoney Ground"
- B-side: "I'll Give You Love"
- Published: Southern Music Pub. Co., Inc. ASCAP
- Released: January 1972
- Label: Uni 55210
- Composer: Conan Byrne-Warren Davis

USA chronology
"Take a Girl Like You" (1970)	"Stoney Ground" (1972)	"Build Me Up Buttercup" (1974)

Stoney Ground was a single for UK soul group The Foundations. It made it on to the US Billboard chart in 1972. It also represented the group's last charting first release of a single.

== Background ==
"Stoney Ground" was composed by Conan Byrne and Warren Davis. It was backed with I'll Give You Love", a Colin Young composition. It's more than likely that Conan Byrne is Con Byrne and Warren Davis is the Warren Davis, both of The Warren Davis Monday Band. Interestingly, Davis had tried out to take the place of Clem Curtis who had decided to leave The Foundations in 1968. Byrne and Davis had also composed "Honey (I Need Your Love)" for Mighty Dodos which was produced by Barry Kingston and released on the Spark label in 1971.

"Stoney Ground" was released in the UK on MCA MKS 5075. It was also released in the United States on Uni 55315. Following the break up of The Foundations in 1970, this was their last single issued in the early 1970s.

When Trend Records started out in early 1968, they had taken on Eric Allandale, trombonist for The Foundations as a producer. The strategy back then was not to have him produce recordings by The Foundations.

Colin Young left The Foundations around October 1970. It was reported by New Musical Express in the week ending October 10 that lead singer Young had left the group to pursue a solo career. He had already signed a contract with Barry Class and was putting together his new group which was called Development. The Foundations split up in late 1970, but the name would later be revived.

== Release ==
It was noted by Record World in the November 13, 1971 issue that "Stoney Ground" was due for a release. The magazine referred to it is as a comeback record for The Foundations. MCA Records MD Derek Everett had entered into a deal with Barry Class of Trend Records which he had described as unique. This was the first record issued by the group since they had finished their contract with Pye Records.

It was released in the UK on MCA MKS 5075 in 1971. In Holland and Australia, it was released on Trend 6099 0106. It also saw a release in New Zealand on MCA MC/S 5525, and in Trinidad & Tobago, it was released on MCA 55315.

Along with "Our World" by Blue Mink, "Annabella Umberella" by Consortium and "Beautiful People" by The New Seekers, the song was included on the 1970s Philips compilation, Top Talent Groups.

== Reviews ==
The single was reviewed by Billboard in the January 22, 1972 issue. Noting the group's return to the disc scene and calling the song a potent swinger, Billboard said it had the potential of "Baby, Now that I've Found You". Also that week, Record World reviewer, Kal Rudman in his Money Music column predicted it would put The Foundations back into the hit scene. A week later it was in the Cash Box Picks of the Week. The reviewer said it carried itself along like a Grassroots breeze, and was their most commercial effort since "Baby, Now That I've Found You". It was also reviewed by Record World that week with the reviewer saying that they were back with more of the pop rock sounds that took them to the top of the Top 40.

== Airplay ==
=== USA ===
For the week of February 5, 1972, Cash Box reported that it was a Primary Market addition, and along with "Precious and Few" by Climax, added to the playlist of WTIX in New Orleans. It was also reported by Cash Box that it was a Secondary Market addition and now on the playlist of WLOF in Orlando.

=== Canada ===
For the week of March 4, 1972, it was in the Secondary Market category, on the playlist of CHOO in Ajax. Still in the secondary market category, it was on the playlist of Red Deer station, CKRD for the week of March 18.

== Charts ==
For the week of January 29, along with Santana, Rod Stewart, The Hillside Singers and BJ Thomas etc., they were on the pop section of the Cash Box Juke Box Programming Guide.

For the week ending February 26, the single made its debut on the Billboard Bubbling Under the Hot 100 chart. Spending a week in the chart it peaked at no. 113.

== Later years ==
In later years, the song has achieved a level of popularity on the Northern Soul scene.

The track was included on The Very Best of the Foundations compilation, released on the Taragon label in 1995, and The Very Best of The Foundations compilation released on the Varese Sarabande label in 2017. In In a review of the compilation, Goldmine said that the songs "Solomon Grundy" and the "last gasp" single "Stoney Ground" were enough to make one forget about the handful of songs on the single sounding similar to "Build Me Up Buttercup" or "Baby, Now That I've Found You."
