= Baby, I Couldn't See =

1969 single by The Foundations

Baby, I Couldn't See was a 1969 single for The Foundations. It enjoyed some popularity in the Netherlands there where it was a chart hit. It has been recorded by a number of other artists in the early 1970s which include, a number of South American acts, a Mexican band, and a New Zealand band.

== Background ==
In addition to the version by The Foundations, New Zealand group Quincy Conserve recorded their version of the song. Somehow, the song was credited to Macleod and Macaulay who the group had a previous partnership with. It was also covered by Brazilian bands, The Pops and Os Selvagens, and included on both of their albums, Reação! and Os Selvagens that were released in 1970. Instrumental artist, Lafayette also recorded a version which appeared on his 1970 album, Apresenta Os Sucessos - Vol. 9. A Mexican group called Las Lineas Blancas (aka The White Lines) recorded a version which appeared on their 1971 album released on Harmony HLS-8570.

== The Foundations version ==
"Baby, I Couldn't See"

Song by The Foundations
- A-side: "Baby, I Couldn't See"
- B-side: "Penny Sir"
- Released: November 7, 1969
- Composers: (Myers, Worsley)
- Producer: Barry Class

The Foundations singles chronology
"My Little Chickadee" (1969)	"Baby, I Couldn't See" (1969)	"Take a Girl Like You" (1969)

The song features Colin Young on lead vocals.

=== Composition and production ===
Barry Class' Trend record label had taken on two new songwriters who had left Southern Music to come on board in 1969. They were David Myers and John Worsley. Together they wrote "Baby, I Couldn't See" for The Foundations. The recording session which was a Trend Production had Barry Class as executive producer. It took place under the direction of Eric Allendale who was the Foundations trombonist and Worsley. Allendale had also been employed by Trend as a producer since 1968. It is possible that Allendale was an uncredited producer on this track.

"Baby, I Couldn't See" was backed with the Colin Young composition "Penny Sir" and released on single, Pye 7N 17849 on 7 November 1969.

=== Reception ===
The song was reviewed in the "Blind Date" section of the November 8, 1969 issue of Melody Maker by Steve Marriott of Small Faces and Jerry Shirley. Jerry asked if it was The Foundations and said that he tried to cheat but could not read the writing. Steve said that he could see it at the Top of the Pops but said that he thought that "they" weren't that knocked out with it because "they" could do better.

It was also reviewed in the November 8 issue of New Musical Express by Derek Johnson. He mentioned that the Foundations had dissolved their partnership with their Macaulay, Macleod song writing team. The chart potential was noted. Johnson also mentioned that their previous single which was a ballad, and a thoroughly competent disc that just didn't catch on. This song had reverted to their happy effervescent style. He said that this could put them back in the chart.

An article appeared in the November 15 issue of New Musical Express about the B side of the single, "Penny Sir" which was composed by Colin Young. It explained that the song was being adopted as the official song for the Save the Children Fund. The group was donating the royalties from "Penny Sir" to the fund as well as performance royalties. The Foundations were also planning a concert at the Royal Albert Hall to support the cause.

=== Chart ===
It was a hit in Holland where it registered on to the Dutch Tipparade chart. Peaking at no. 8 on week three, It stayed in the chart for four weeks.

Chart summary

Country	Chart (1969)	Peak position	Weeks
Holland	Tipparade	8	

=== Performances ===
The song was performed for the Top of the Pops radio show on November 19, 1969. There was also an interview on that show.

=== Later years ===
Some five decades later, the song was performed live by Alan Warner's Foundations in 2020.
