= Any Old Time (You're Lonely and Sad) =

Single by The Foundations
- B-side: "We Are Happy People"
- Released: 1968
- Genre: Pop
- Label: Pye (UK); Uni (US)
- Songwriters: Tony Macaulay; John Macleod
- Producer: Tony Macaulay

The Foundations singles chronology
"Back on My Feet Again" (1968)	"Any Old Time (You're Lonely and Sad)" (1968)	"Build Me Up Buttercup" (1968)

"Any Old Time (You're Lonely and Sad)" was the third single by the Foundations. It reached number 48 on the UK Singles Chart. It was the last single they released with Clem Curtis as their lead singer. Their next single with lead singer Colin Young would give them a bigger hit with "Build Me Up Buttercup".

The B side, "We Are Happy People", which was composed by Foundations trombone player Eric Allandale, was a top 10 hit in Scandinavia for Swedish group Slam Creepers’.

The Foundations would re-record the song in stereo and with Colin Young on vocals instead of Clem Curtis. This appeared on their 1968 LP released on Marble Arch MALS 1157. Clem Curtis and Alan Warner re-recorded the song in the 1980s as Clem Curtis and the Foundations.

== Charts ==
Chart (1968)	Peak position
Argentina (Escalera a la Fama)	7
New Zealand (Listener)	20
