= Trend Records (UK label) =

Defunct English record label

- Parent company: Trend Records Inc.
- Founded: 1968
- Founder: Barry Class
- Distributors: Saga Records, MCA Records, Uni, Pathé-Marconi, Pye
- Genre: Various
- Country of origin: England

Trend Records was an English Record label which existed from the late 1960s until the early 1970s. It issued recordings by such notable artists and personalities as Consortium, The Foundations, Audrey Hall, Marcus Lipton, Julie Stevens, Warm Dust and Colin Young.

== Background ==
In February 1968, the label was launched. They had entered into a deal with Associated Records. Promotion was handled by Richard Eddy of Trend and Andrew Vere of Saga Records. All of the acts that had been signed to Barry Class' company Barry Class Management would have their recordings issued on the label. One act, The Foundations that Class managed would not have their recordings issued on Trend. Prior to the February launch, Class was speculating on issuing budget records.

Trend Records was one of the Class group of companies which also included Class Destination Inc., Class Management, Class Theatrical Agency and the Disci chain of record shops.

In 1968, the label was headquartered at Classic House, 113 Westbourne Grove, London W.2. It appears that for a period of time in 1968, Curtis Clements was employed as an assistant.

== History ==
=== 1960s ===
In February, 1968, Beat Instrumental reported that the two first releases for Trend Records were "Breaking up A Dream" by the Ways and Means and "Speak to Me" by The Explosion. Both records to be available on the 9th. Also that month on the 23rd, "Step Down" by the Rangers would be issued. The Ways and Means were a group that was managed by Scotsman Ron Fairway. The group had previously released a single, "Sea of Faces" bw "Make the Radio a Little Louder" on the Pye label which got to no. 41 on the Radio Caroline charts on the week beginning January 21, 1967. With their release on Trend, "Breaking Up A Dream", said to be their finest recording, it was in a different musical direction from the surf music covers that had been doing. The band eventually became Chaucer's Tales.

A producer for the label at the time was Eric Allandale who played trombone for The Foundations.

In January 1969, Hong Kong group, Danny Diaz & The Checkmates won the Hong Kong's Battle of the Sounds contest which was organised by Levi Strauss. They also won a $10, 000 recording contract with Trend Records. The result was the single, "Solomon Grundy" backed with "Goodbye Baby" which was released in the UK on Pye 7N 17690. They were pictured with The Foundations in the Record Mirror February 8 issue who were hosting the group who were in London for the single's launch. Foundations manager Barry Class had arranged for them to come to the UK.

The Seventies Sevens website says that it was reported in the November 5, 1969 issue of Record Retailer that songwriters, David Myers and John Worsley left Southern Music to join Barry Class' Trend label that year. They wrote "Baby, I Couldn't See" for The Foundations. Eric Allendale who had been taken on as a producer for Trend in 1968 co-directed the song's recording with Worsley. It was a Trend production and Barry Class was the executive producer. Backed with Colin Young's composition "Penny Sir", it was released on single, Pye 7N 17849 in 1969. It became a minor hit in Holland, making it on to the Dutch Tipparade chart. It peaked there at no. 8 on week three.

=== 1970 ===
It was reported by Cash Box in the January 31 issue that Trend Records had put together a sampler with excerpts by three artists, The Chads with "Dearest Belinda", Consortium with "Melanie Cries Alone" and Abel Mann with "The Sun in My Morning". Each section had an introductions by deejay David Hamilton for each song. The Consortium song was released that month. Backed with "Copper Coloured Years" it was released on Trend TNT 52.

As reported by Cash Box in the June 20, 1970 issue, Barry Class and Trend Records had put out a single by Marcus Lipton who was a Socialist member of parliament for the Brixton area. Lipton was hoping to run again. Interestingly the catalogue number MP 6500 represented the amount of his majority when he had been elected twenty five years earlier. The A side was described Cash Box as having a Bread logo at the top and the B side having a butter motif. The single "Hand in Hand" was backed with "Friends in Need". When the single was released, the label was Butterfly, yellow in color and credited to Marcus Lipton CBE, MP And Friends.

It was reported by New Musical Express in the week ending October 10, 1970 issue that Colin Young. the lead singer of The Foundations had left the group to pursue a solo career. He had already signed a contract with Barry Class and was putting together his new band which was called Development.

In late 1970 Barry Class wanted to revive the Foundations name. The revived group was fronted by Colin Young on vocals. Graham Preskett was the group's musical director. He also played guitar and electric violin. Other members included Jean Roussel on keys, Steve Bingham and Roger Cawkwell on sax and flute. They toured throughout Latin America and even played at the Expo-Show in Buenos Aires. They continued though to early 1971.

As reported in the December 19 issue of Record World, Class had signed a distribution with Pathé-Marconi for the distribution of Trend product in France and Italy. Two bands that were ready for distribution were Warm Dust and Swegas.

=== 1971 ===
Colin Young had an album released on the Stateside label It was called In The Beginning and credited to Colin Young's Development, which was recorded by Trend. The musicians on the album included Graham Preskett on violin, guitar, banjo, harmonica, melodica, Steve Bingham on bass, Roger Cawkwell on flute, recorder and saxophones, Jean Roussel on organ and piano and Eddie "Tan Tan" Thornton on trombone and trumpet etc. That year Colin Young also had a single, "Any Time at All" bw "You're No Good" released on Trend 6099 005. It was produced by Tony Rockliff and Barry Class. It was also released on Uni 55286. A Hot 100 prediction, it was in Billboard's Top 60 Pop Spotlight section for the week ending June 5, 1971.

Managed by Rodney Harrod and Philip Peverley, Development went to Argentina in early 1971. Argentinian newspaper Crónica had them on the front page and ran an article about the group on page 2. Two weeks another article explained that Colin Young's group were also going by the name Development. Leo Vanes in his Leorama feature have the group a luke warm review in the 25 February issue of Crónica.

Also in 1971, following a recent negotiation in Los Angeles with MCA Records involving the label's president Mike Maitland and Russ Reagan. Trend Records were in another deal. As reported by Billboard in the February 27 issue, the label had entered into a deal with Uni Records for a three-year lease for distribution in the United States and Canada.

That year, Audrey Hall came to the label. The single single she recorded for Trend was "Getting Ready For a Heartache". It was backed with her own composition, "M.Y.O.B. Leave Me Alone" The single did get some mainstream airplay. Following its release, there was no material from Trend for her to record. Her mother had invited her to join her in New York so she requested a release from the label.

Consortium had a single released, "Annabella " bw "Tell Me My Friend" on Trend 6099 004 in 1971.

On the week of September 12, Consortium's "Melanie Cries Alone" made its debut at no. 18 on the Top 20 TMP chart in Portugal. Spending another week in the chart, it got to no. 13.

Actress Julie Stevens recorded a single for the label. "After Haggerty" was backed with "A Long Way From Home" which was released on Trend 6099 008.

It was reported by Record World in the November 13, 1971 issue that Director Class had entered into a deal with MCA Records in the UK. Derek Everett the managing director for MCA was describing the deal as unique. The deal had enabled the release of the single, "Stoney Ground" by The Foundations. The record got on to the Billboard Bubbling Under the Hot 100 chart, spending a week there, it peaked at no. 113.

=== 1972 ===
In 1972, Consortium had the single, "Sunday in The Park" bw "Tell Me My Friend" released in Portugal on Trend 6099 011.

== Staff ==
- Barry Class - director
- Sylvia Class
- Curtis Clements - assistant
- Richard Eddy - promotion
- Andrew Vere - promotion (Saga Records)
- Eric Allandale - producer

== Later years ==
In the 1990s, Barry Class was presiding over the Hollywood Boulevard Studios at 6356 Hollywood Boulevard, Hollywood, 90028, CA. The studio which would take care of the audio and visual aspects of an artist's recording. The facility was set to open in February or March, 1993.

== See also ==
- Category:Trend Records (UK label) artists
- Category:Trend Records (UK label) singles
