= David Myers (songwriter) =

- Born: David Victor Myers
- Origin: England
- Occupations: Songwriter, producer

David Myers is an English songwriter who has written songs for artists such as Dalston Diamonds, The Foundations, Linda Kelly, Billy Ocean, Rainbow, Sonny Reeder, Clodagh Rodgers, and Johnny Tudor. His greatest hit success was with "Jack in the Box".

== Background ==
Along with John Worsley, David Myers was employed by Southern Music as a songwriter. They would later work for the Trend record label which was owned by Barry Class.

Two of his compositions have been Eurovision entries.

== Career ==
Having left Southern Music in 1969, David Myers and John Worsley were now employed as songwrtiters for Barry Class' Trend record label. Myers and Worsley wrote "Baby, I Couldn't See" which was recorded by The Foundations in 1969. Backed with "Penny Sir" it was released on Pye 7N 17849. It made it on to the Dutch Tipparade chart, peaking at no. 8 on week three. The song was also recorded by the New Zealand group, Quincy Conserve. Unfortunately the song was credited to Macleod and Macaulay. It was also recorded by Brazilian bands, The Pops and Os Selvagens, and included on both of their albums, Reação! and Os Selvagens that were released in 1970. Instrumental artist, Lafayette also recorded a version which appeared on his 1970 album, Apresenta Os Sucessos - Vol. 9. Some fifty years later, the song was performed live by Alan Warner's Foundations in 2020.

Myers and John Worsley wrote "Oh My Maria" which was recorded by Danny Street. Released on CBS in 1970, it was arranged by Danny Arthey and produced by Teddy White and backed with "In the Dead of Night.

David Myers and John Worsley co-wrote the song "Melanie Cries Alone" which was English psychedelic pop group Consortium. The song was produced by John Worsley and arranged by Steve Grey. It was a hit in Portugal. Peaking at no. 13, It was in the chart for two weeks.

Myers and Worsley wrote "Open Up Your Heart" which was recorded by Thomas & Richard Frost. Produced by Gene Page, it was released on Liberty 56191. A pick of the week, it was given a positive review by Cash Box in the magazine's August 8, 1970 issue. It was later recorded by Rainbow and became a hit in 1972. On the week of April 15, 1972, "Open Up Your Heart as shown by Billboard was a regional breakout. It was also at no. 118 in the Billboard Bubbling Under The Hot 100 chart. It peaked at 114 the following week and spent one more week in the chart.

With John Worsley, he wrote "Jack in the Box" which was a hit for Clodagh Rodgers in 1971. The record got to no. 3 on the UK chart. It was a selected song in the 1971 Eurovision contest.

David Myers and John Worsley worked with a singer called Les Charles and composed a song for him. A single "Nashville Rain" was released on Spark Records. The singer would eventually be known as Billy Ocean.

Along with John Worsley and John Myatt, he wrote "Kamikazi Krazy" for the group Dalston Diamonds. The single was reviewed in the 12 April 1975 issue of Sounds. It received a positive review with three stars. The "breakneck speed" pace of the record was noted as well as the "extraordinary sax duet" that slides from Glenn Miller into the late 20s. The song was included on the Disco Explosion Vol. 2 compilation that was released on Pickwick SHM 914 in 1976.

Working with John Macleod he composed "Where Were You When I Needed Your Love" which was recorded by Clem Curtis & the Foundations. It was released in the UK on Summit SU 100. It was reviewed in the 26 March issue of Record Mirror. The reviewer gave it two stars said it was not a lot different from "Build Me Up Buttercup". The song would be an entry in the United Kingdom in the Eurovision Song Contest 1977. It was picked to be a winner but due to a strike by electricians, the group's performance was not televised. The song got airplay on Radio Tees and David Hoare had it down as a hit pick.

He co-wrote "Love Breakdown" with Graham Sacher which was recorded by John Kincaide. It was released on RCA Victor PB 5734.
