= Digging the Foundations =

Studio album by the Foundations
- Released: July 1969
- Length: 36:11
- Label: Pye (NSPL.18290)
- Producers: John Macleod; Tony Macaulay

The Foundations chronology
Rocking the Foundations (1968)	Digging the Foundations (1969)	Golden Hour of the Foundations (1973)

Digging the Foundations is the final studio album by English soul group the Foundations. The album includes two of the group's hits, "In the Bad, Bad Old Days" and "My Little Chickadee". The album was released in the UK on the Pye label in 1969. There would be various issues relating to the album that would be a cause of concern for the group.

== Background ==
When the album was released, the cover depicted the band members in a gravel pit at work in prison garb, ball and chain attached to them, digging with picks and shovels. The inside of the cover had the group members presented individually with mug shots and related personal information. Five of the eleven songs were original compositions by the band members and the rest were by Tony Macaulay and John Macleod with the exception of the Robert Saker and Jack Winsley composition, "Waiting On the Shores of Nowhere". In 1969, the group had more control over their material. This was made possible by their manager Barry Class having negotiated a new contract for the group with their label Pye.

According to the April 26 issue of Billboard, the album was due to be available in the US in May on a rush release. It was due for release in the UK after the summer. When the album was released, one song, "Why Does She Keep On" wasn't included. Another title which wasn't included was "I Don't Know Why". It was performed for the 23rd June edition of the Top of The Pops radio show. As the song begins, host Brian Matthew says "This is another of their songs from it" (meaning the album).

The album was released in the US on UNI 73058, and in the UK on Pye NSPL.18290.

It was reported by Billboard in the 18 October 1969 issue that the Foundations were touring Scandinavia and Philips were doing a promotion for the album.

The song "Solomon Grundy" has a history that predates the placing of the Foundations' version on this album. Eric Allandale was commissioned to write a straight pop song for the popular band from the Philippines, Danny Diaz and the Checkmates who then recorded Allandale's composition. They had won the Battle of the Sound competition which got them a $10,000 recording contract, appearances on radio and television in Britain and on the European Continent, and the chance to record their first UK single, "Solomon Grundy". It was also recorded by Pickettywitch who performed it on the televised talent show, Opportunity Knocks. Another Allandale composition from the album, "I Can Feel It", was covered by Chuck Bennett and was a hit for him in Germany in 1970. Mac Kissoon also covered the song which was included on his Souled Out album, released the same year.

== Reception ==
=== 1960s ===
There were two albums reviewed in the Pop Best Bets section of the 2 July 1969 issue of Cash Box. One was Nothing But a Heartache by The Flirtations, and the other was Digging The Foundations. The reviewer began with "This is a sprightly set of rockers freshly performed". Taking note of "In the Bad, Bad Old Days" and "My Little Chickadee, the reviewer referred to it as a very nice package, and said the other highlights were "Solomon Grundy" and "A Penny Sir".

The album got a thorough review by Disc and Music Echo in the magazine's July 5 issue. The reviewer made note of the fact that since "Baby, Now That I've Found You" the group had failed to make the Top 30 and then with the departure of Clem Curtis, there was a presumption by many of the knockers that this would be the end of The Foundations. But with the vocals of Colin Young on "Build Me Up Buttercup" which was a rocket powered boost to the top of the charts in both the UK and the US, the group's potential was obvious. The reviewer also said that the proof that it wasn't a fluke was when Colin Young came back and did it with "In the Bad Bad Old Days".

All of the tracks were individually reviewed.

Calling the group "a great little band" and complementing Colin Young's vocal style, the reviewer said that this was their best album to date and that it should have had more folk digging them. The mentioned tracks were "My Little Chickadee", "I Can Feel It" and "In the Bad Bad Old Days".

The album had a brief review in the 2 August issue of Record World. The two mentioned songs were "In the Bad Bad Old Days" and "My Little Chickadee". Calling the album nice, the reviewer said that the band bridged the pop-R&B-bubblegum gap.

== Singles ==
"In the Bad, Bad Old Days" made its debut on 18 march and spent ten weeks in the UK charts where it peaked at no. 8. It got to no. 51 in the US. "My Little Chickadee" got to no. 99 in the US.

== Issues ==
The Foundations had become embroiled in a row with their record label Pye and producer due to five tracks from their album Digging the Foundations having been leaked to other artists. It had been reported in the 7 June issue of Melody Maker that according to the group, there were songs that were supposed to be exclusive to them. It was also reported that the group were holding off on the release of their album until September. They had discovered that the songs were going to be released by other artists. One of the "exclusive" songs to be released on single was "My Little Chickadee", which had been covered by Geno Washington the same time as the Foundations' version was released on the UNI label in the US. Barry Class, the manager of the group was due to meet with Pye chief Louis Benjamin when the article went to press.

An early version of the album wasn't what the group wanted, and they were not happy with it. Foundations organist Tony Gomesz was interviewed by Brian Matthew for the 23rd June Top of the Pops show. Prior to "Waiting on the Shores of Nowhere" being played, Matthews asked Gomesz why after a string of hits, the Foundations have opted to produce their own discs, and when did they make that decision? Gomesz explained that when the group was in New York they got an advance copy of their album which wasn't to their requirements, so they remade the album. He also said that it was then that they decided from then on that they would do their own producing.

Due to the racial policies of South Africa and the authorities not allowing multi-racial groups to be seen, the album had to be released there in a plain cover.

== Track listing ==
Side one

1. "My Little Chickadee" (Macleod-Macaulay) – 2:56
2. "Till Night Brought Day" (Warner, McBeth, Gomez) – 3:09
3. "Waiting On the Shores of Nowhere" (Saker, J. Winsley) – 3:07
4. "In the Bad Bad Old Days" (Macleod-Macaulay) – 3:22
5. "A Penny Sir" (C. Young) – 3:11
6. "I Can Feel It" (E. Allendale) – 3:40

Side two

1. "Take Away the Emptiness Too" (Macleod-Macaulay) – 2:57
2. "Let the Heartaches Begin" (Macleod-Macaulay) – 2:55
3. "A Walk Through the Trees" (P. Burke) – 3:38
4. "That Same Old Feeling" (Macleod-Macaulay) – 3:06
5. "Solomon Grundy" (E. Allendale) – 4:10

== Later years ==
The album with bonus tracks was released in CD format by Repertoire Records (cat# REP4183-WZ) in 1991. In 2018 Wasabi Records released the album (cat# WSBAC-0102) in blu-spec format. The CD came with eight bonus tracks and liner notes by Masato Wakatsuki (若月眞人).

In a 2022 review of the Foundations' Am I Groovin' You – The Pye Anthology, the reviewer suggested that some members were displeased with the recording of the album and singled out Long John Baldry's record "Let the Heartaches Begin", which pushed "Baby, Now That I've Found You" off the no. 1 spot as a possible source of displeasure. However the reviewer in 2022 said that the Foundations' version had a lot going for it and mentioned that it had an air of an early Drifters hit and a touch of the Isley Brothers about it. The reviewer also mentioned that "Take Away the Emptiness" had aspects of the Chairmen of the Board at their best.
