= Jack in the Box (song) =

1971 song by Clodagh Rodgers

Single by Clodagh Rodgers
- Released: 12 March 1971
- Length: 3:00
- Label: RCA Victor
- Composer: John Worsley
- Lyricist: David Myers
- Producer: Kenny Young

Eurovision Song Contest 1971 entry
- Country: United Kingdom
- Artist: Clodagh Rodgers
- Language: English
- Composer: John Worsley
- Lyricist: David Myers
- Conductor: Johnny Arthey

Finals performance
- Final result: 4th
- Final points: 98

Entry chronology
- ◄ "Knock, Knock Who's There?" (1970)
- "Beg, Steal or Borrow" (1972) ►

"Jack in the Box" is a song composed by John Worsley, with lyrics by David Myers, and performed by the Northern Irish singer Clodagh Rodgers. It represented the United Kingdom in the Eurovision Song Contest 1971 placing fourth.

The singer expresses her strong feelings of love to a man who treats her like a toy, thus providing the "jack in the box" simile, as she feels that in exchange for his love, she would gladly "bounce on a spring" like the aforementioned toy (but is not so thrilled to do it without reciprocation). At the end of the song, however, she lets this man know that one day she will be fed up enough to leave, so she hopes he will tell her he loves her, as she will do anything (within a reasonable time frame) to hear those words.

On 20 February 1971 Rodgers sang six songs at the UK National Final, A Song for Europe, which was aired on the television series It's Cliff Richard!. Rodgers was chosen by the BBC to be the United Kingdom's representative for that year, with the intent to ease tensions between Great Britain and Northern Ireland. Due to a postal service strike, regional juries voted and picked "Jack in the Box", the third song performed that evening, to accompany Rodgers to Dublin. Rodgers later said she received death threats from the Irish Republican Army for representing the United Kingdom at Eurovision.

In 1971, each national broadcaster was required to show "preview" videos; the BBC used footage from It's Cliff Richard! to showcase during Preview Week. In Dublin, the song was performed ninth on the night, after Luxembourg's Monique Melsen with "Pomme, pomme, pomme", and before Belgium's Lily Castel and Jacques Raymond with "Goeiemorgen, Morgen". For the performance Rodgers wore a pink frilly top and spangled hot pants. At the end of judging that evening, "Jack in the Box" took the fourth-place slot with 98 points.

After Eurovision, the song placed at No. 4 on the UK Singles Chart and number 67 on The Australian Kent Music Report. It remains her most famous hit.

Two Swedish versions were made in 1971 by the popular Swedish artists Towa Carson (CBS 7111) and Marianne Kock (Decca F 44561). The Swedish title was Simsalabim.

== Charts ==
Chart (1971)	Peak position
Australia (Kent Music Report)	67
New Zealand (Listener)	6
United Kingdom (Official Charts Company)	4

== Cultural reference ==
This song features prominently in the Monty Python's Flying Circus episode "The Cycling Tour", in which an eccentric inventor named Mr. Reginald Gulliver (Terry Jones) believes, as a result of head trauma, that he is Clodagh Rodgers. At the end of the episode, two Terry Gilliam-animated monsters, who have been eyeing the cyclist lead character, Mr. Pither (Michael Palin), from behind a bush, wait until Pither is gone, jump out and start dancing to Rodgers' rendition of "Jack in the Box".

The lyrics of the song were rewritten and used later in 1971 by the UK Government in a series of television advertisements to promote participation in the 1971 UK census. The title of this version was "Tick in the Box", informing members of the public of how to complete the census form. The same version of the song was recycled ten years later for the 1981 census advertising. The singer of this version of the song is unknown.

Preceded by "Knock, Knock Who's There?" by Mary Hopkin	United Kingdom in the Eurovision Song Contest; 1971	Succeeded by "Beg, Steal or Borrow" by The New Seekers
