= Back on My Feet Again =

Single by The Foundations
- B-side: "I Can Take or Leave Your Loving"
- Released: 1968
- Genre: Pop
- Length: 2:48
- Label: Pye, UK Uni, US
- Songwriters: Tony Macaulay, John Macleod
- Producer: Tony Macaulay

The Foundations singles chronology
"Baby, Now That I've Found You" (1967)	"Back on My Feet Again" (1968)	"Any Old Time (You're Lonely and Sad)" (1968)

"Back on My Feet Again" is the second single released by the Foundations. It was the follow-up to their hit single "Baby, Now That I've Found You". It was written by Tony Macaulay and John MacLeod and produced by Tony Macaulay. It charted at number 18 in the UK and also in Ireland. It reached No. 59 in the U.S. and number 29 in Canada.

== Background ==
Clem Curtis was the lead vocalist on this song.

According to bass guitarist Peter MacBeth, they had a choice of three songs; they recorded two and then went with "Back on My Feet Again". This, their second single was released in January 1968,

According to Eric Allandale in a February, 1968 article in Beat Instrumental, the band's new equipment made a difference in the recording. Allandale also said that they didn't use any session musicians. They only doubled on flute with Pat Burke playing that part.

Other version by the Foundations

A re-recorded version featuring Clem Curtis's replacement, Colin Young, appeared on the Marble Arch album. The B-side of the single, "I Can Take or Leave Your Loving", was written by Rick Jones

== Live appearances and special broadcasts ==
The January 20, 1968 issue of New Musical Express wrote that The Foundations, along with The Tremeloes and the Alan Price Set etc. were set for a BBC-1 appearance in the next few days.

== Reception ==
The single was reviewed in the January 20 issue of New Musical Express. The reviewer referred to it as a scorcher and a very good pop record. The throaty vocals, organ, handclaps, brass and stormy beat were the bonuses. There was just some minor criticism that the tune wasn't as catchy as the B side, "Need Your Loving" (the reviewer most likely referring to the B side, "I Can Take or Leave Your Loving"), and too much top (possibly referring the treble). The B side was composed by Rick Jones.

== Releases ==
- The Foundations - "Back on My Feet Again" / "I Can Take or Leave Your Loving" - PYE 7N 17417 - 1968
- The Foundations - "Back on My Feet Again" / "I Can Take or Leave Your Loving" - UNI 55058

== Charts ==
The single made its debut at no. 24 in the Melody Maker Pop 30 on the week of 10 February. It also debuted at no. 24 in the Disc and Music Echo TOP 30 chart that week. Whilst not doing as well as the first single, it spent ten weeks in the UK chart, and made it to No. 18. It made it to No. 29 in Canada.

Chart (1968)	Peak position
Argentina	13
Canada Top Singles (RPM)	29
Ireland (IRMA)	18
Netherlands (Dutch Top 40)	32
UK Singles (Official Charts)	18
US Billboard Hot 100	59
