= 2NU =

Band

- Years active: 1990–1991, 1997–present
- Labels: Atlantic (former), NU Music (current)
- Members: Jock Blaney; Michael Nealy
- Website: 2nu2.com

2NU (pronounced "two new", and later 2NU2) is an American pop music group based in Seattle, Washington. Their music consists of spoken word performances accompanied by beats and sound effects. They are best known for their single "This Is Ponderous", which reached #46 on the Billboard Hot 100 in 1991. Original band members included Michael Nealy (lyrics), Jock Blaney (lyrics, lead and background vocals), Phil DeVault (keyboard, synclavier, guitar), Tom Martin (bass). In 2009, their song "Crossroads" was featured in a television commercial for Johnnie Walker.

== Name ==
When "This Is Ponderous" began getting radio play in 1990, the band had not formally come together. A DJ introducing the song said it was from a group "too new" to have a name, and "2NU" came from that.

== Discography ==
=== Albums ===
- Ponderous (1991)
- 2NU2.com (2000)
- Raging Skies (2017)

=== EPs ===
- This Is Ponderous (1991)
- Command Z (1999)

=== Singles ===
List of singles, with selected chart positions
Title	Year	Charts		Album
Title	Year	US	AUS	Album
"This Is Ponderous"	1990	46	75	Ponderous
"Spaz Attack"	1991	—	—	Ponderous
"The Island"	1999	—	—	2nu2.com
