= Clem Curtis & the Foundations =

English musical group (1972–2017)

- Also known as: Clem Curtis & the Foundations Ltd., the Foundations, the Foundations with Clem Curtis
- Origin: England
- Genres: Soul, R&B, pop
- Years active: 1972–2017
- Labels: Riverdale, IDM, Opium, Psycho, RCA Victor, Summit
- Spinoff of: The Foundations
- Past members: Clem Curtis; Roy Carter; Derek Lewis; Emmett North Jr.; Valentine Pascal; John Lumley-Saville; John Springate

Clem Curtis & the Foundations were an English soul, R&B recording and performing act who were fronted by Clem Curtis. They were formed some years after the Foundations broke up. They were entrants in the 1977 UK Eurovision contest. They also had a chart hit with "On Broadway" in 1980. One of their early members would go on to be a member of the Glitter Band. One would later join the band Hot Chocolate and another would go on to be a member of the funk band Heatwave. At times, the group would alternate between the names Clem Curtis & the Foundations, and the Foundations.

== Background ==
Clem Curtis left the Foundations in 1968 and was replaced by Colin Young. He then embarked on a solo career. He later returned to the UK and formed his version of The Foundations.

An early version of the group included John Springate who played with Johnny Johnson and the Bandwagon. His brother Bill Springate was also a member.

Along with Clem Curtis, the later mid seventies line up consisted of David Christopher George, Valentine Pascal, John Lumley-Saville, and Derek Lewis. Derek was actually Clem Curtis' brother.

Later musicians include guitarist Emmet North Jr. who was a member in the 1980s. He was formerly with Barry White's group, The Love Unlimited Orchestra, Bassist Nixon Rosembert was a member too.

== Career ==
=== 1970s to 1980s ===
Along with Anita Harris, Ted Rogers and Ryan and Ronnie, the Karliffs, and Max Boyce, Clem Curtis and the Foundations were appearing at Gwyn Hall in Neath in December, 1972.

John Springate and his brother had just come back from a long period having worked in Canada and they joined Clem Curtis and the Foundations. He also contributed vocals. But with Clem Curtis singing "Baby..." and Springate singing "Da da da da", he felt that it wasn't a great career move and decided to leave. He answered ads in Melody Maker. One of the ads he followed up would lead to the Glitter Band. In 1973, he had joined the Glitter Band, replacing bassist Ray Moxley.

An article about Brian Johnston of the White Plains on the White Plains Chronicles website has information provided by James Payne that gives a partial line-up of a 1973 version of Clem Curtis' Foundations. Listed were Clem Curtis on vocals, Eric Allandale on trombone, Brian Johnston on keyboards and Jim Payne on drums. Eric, like Clem Curtis, was an original Foundations member.

On February 16, 1974, Clem Curtis & the Foundations played at the California Ballroom.

The group went to Australia for a month-long tour in 1975. The members at the time were Clem Curtis, David Christopher George, Valentine Pascal, Roy Carter, Derek Lewis and John Lumley Saville. The tour was marred by what was said to be a trumped up assault charge. Curtis was taken off of a jet in handcuffs by New South Wales Police officers and was locked in a police cell.

The Foundations with Clem Curtis along with Junior Walker & the All Stars, KC & the Sunshine Band and Mac & Katie Kissoon were the artists listed in the July 19, 1975, issue of Sounds to appear at the soul festival held at Wrexham Football Club's grounds on August 3.

Some time in 1975, Derek Lewis had joined Hot Chocolate. He would be pictured with the band in a photo in Music Week in 1977.

At some stage in the mid-1970s while Clem Curtis and his "Foundations" group were on the road, another "Foundations" group led by Colin Young was also on the road. Both groups seemed to be playing the same kind of material. This eventually led to court action that resulted in Clem Curtis being allowed to bill his group as either the Foundations, or Clem Curtis & the Foundations. Young was allowed to bill himself as the New Foundations, or Colin Young & the New Foundations; this is not to be confused with the American New Foundations, who released the song, "Darling You're All I Need" in 1975. Colin Young & Co. would release a single "Something for My Baby" in early 1976 As the New Foundations, Clem Curtis' group recorded "Make a Wish" / "Amanda" which was released on Riverdale RR 100 in 1976, and credited to Clem Curtis & the Foundations Ltd. "Amanda" was composed by Valentine Pascal, Roy Carter and Georges Delanbanque. It was reviewed in the May 29, 1976, issue of Record Mirror. The reviewer called it "Pop soul on a weak song that sugars the ears of the listener".

By December 18, 1976, the group's single, "Sweet Happiness" backed with "Lady Luck" had been released on Riverdale RR 105. The record was reviewed in the January 8, 1977, issue of Record Mirror by Barry Cain. It wasn't complementary and Cain gave it just one star, calling the vocals strained and the song sloppy.

Eurovision entry with "Where Were You When I Needed Your Love"

The twelve groups whose songs were to be performed at the New London Theatre on March 9 for Britain's Eurovision entry were listed in the January 15, 1977, issue of Record World, which included the Foundations. The March 10, 1977, issue of The Stage reported that Clem Curtis & the Foundations had been reunited with Foundations original producer John Macleod who had co-written a song with Dave Myers for the Song for Europe contest.

The group now billing themselves as the Foundations were now competing in the Eurovision 1977 song contest with "Where Were You When I Needed Your Love", a Dave Meyers and John Macleod composition. The line-up was Leroy Carter, John Savile, Valentine Pascal, Clem Curtis, and Georges Delanbanque. They were favorites to win, but due to a strike by electricians, they were not televised. They ended up placing third with "What Do You Say To Love" by Mary Mason in second place and "Rock Bottom" by Lynsey de Paul as the winner. A small ad appeared on the bottom of page 55 of the 26 March issue of Music Week. It said, "If you missed Eurovision on TV watch CRACKERJACK this Friday FOUNDATIONS "Where Were You When I Needed Your Love". The single was reviewed in the March 26 issue of Record Mirror by Rosalind Russell. She gave it two stars said it was not a lot different from "Build Me Up Buttercup". Also that month, "Where Were You When I Needed Your Love" was getting air-play on Radio Tees and David Hoare had it down as a hit.

Further activities

Roy Carter left the band. And in 1977, he had joined Heatwave. He replaced Heatwave member Jesse White, who was murdered.

The group covered the Sonny Casella composition, "Closer to Loving You" which was previously recorded by Dooley Silverspoon. Theirs was released on Psycho P P2603. It was reviewed by Rosalind Russell in the May 13, 1978, issue of Record Mirror. She referred to the disco record as mediocre. The B side of the single was the Bill Connor and Simon Cohen composition, "Change My Life". Over the years, the song has gained popularity among Northern soul fans. It appears on the Fab-U-Lus Northern Soul 10-inch LP album compilation.

Clem Curtis & the Foundations, along with Ben E. King, were some of the artists that were appearing at a nostalgic soul event held at Lewisham Concert Hall on September 28, 1980.

As Clem Curtis & the Foundations, they recorded a version of "On Broadway" that was released on the IDM label in 1984. It charted in the UK, making its debut on the ILA Airplay Top 10 on the week of 1 September at no. 3. It was still in the chart at no. 5 during the week of September 29.

=== 1990s to 2000s ===
In the early 1990s, the line up of Clem Curtis & The Foundations included Emmett North Jr. on guitar, Graham Cuttill on drums Dave Stevens on keyboards, Neil Pyzer on saxophone and percussion, Tee Green on backing vocals and congas, and a bassist called Lenny.

Clem Curtis & The Foundations kept performing well into the 2010s with Curtis now in his seventies. At one performance where he was on a bill with Martha Reeves & The Vandellas, he announced that he was 74 years old and had 17 grandchildren, 6 great-grandchildren, and one great-great-grandchild. At that time the band had taken on a female saxophone player.

Along with Lulu, Earth Wind & Fire, The Bay City Rollers, Imagination, Clem Curtis & the Foundations were booked to appear at the Flashback Festival which was held from Friday 19th to Sunday 21 August 2016 at Thoresbury Estate, Newark.

The group still had a booking to fill as a headline act at the Norfolk Motorhome Show, Norwich for 21–23 July 2017.

== Death ==
Clem Curtis died in March, 2017 from cancer at age 76.

== Discography ==
Singles
Act	Release	Catalogue	Year	Notes
Clem Curtis & The Foundations Ltd	"Make a Wish" / "Amanda"	Riverdale RR 100	1976	
Clem Curtis And The Foundations	"Sweet Happiness" / "Lady Luck"	Riverdale RR 105	1976	
The Foundations	"Where Were You When I Needed Your Love" / "Love Me Nice and Easy"	Summit SU 100	1977	
The Foundations	"Closer To Loving You" / "Change My Life"	Psycho P2603	2008	
Clem Curtis And The Foundations	"Broadway" / "Broadway" (instrumental)	IDM IDM 69	1984	
Clem Curtis And The Foundations	"Baby Now That I've Found You" / "Baby Now That I've Found You" (Instrumental)	Opium OPIN 001	1987	Released on RCA Victor 104801 in Australia in 1988

=== Clem Curtis and The Foundations line ups ===
Early 1970s line-up

- Clem Curtis
- Bill Springate
- John Springate
- Del Watson
- Paul Wilmot

1975 line up

- Clem Curtis
- David Christopher George
- Valentine Pascal
- Roy Carter
- Derek Lewis
- John Lumley Saville

1977 line-up

- Clem Curtis
- Leroy Carter
- John Savile aka John Saville
- Valentine Pascal
- Georges Delanbanque

Other members

- James Colah
- Michael J. Parlett
- Steve Walters
- Tee Green
- Keith Waites
- Graham Cuttill
