= In the Bad Bad Old Days (Before You Loved Me) =

Single by The Foundations

from the album Digging The Foundations
- B-side: "Give Me Love"
- Released: 1969
- Genre: Pop
- Label: Pye, UK; Uni, US
- Songwriters: Tony Macaulay, John McLeod
- Producer: Tony Macaulay

The Foundations singles chronology
| "Build Me Up Buttercup" (1968) | "In the Bad Bad Old Days (Before You Loved Me)" (1969) | "Born to Live, Born to Die" (1968) |

"In the Bad Bad Old Days" was a hit for The Foundations in 1969. It was the fourth hit single for the group. It was written by Tony Macaulay and John McLeod. It went to #8 in the UK Singles Chart, #7 in Ireland, and #23 in Canada. It was also covered by Edison Lighthouse, and appeared on Johnny Johnson and the Bandwagon's Soul Survivor album.

== Releases ==
- The Foundations - "In the Bad Bad Old Days (Before You Loved Me)" / "Give Me Love" - PYE 7N 17417 - 1968
- The Foundations - "In the Bad Bad Old Days (Before You Loved Me)" / "Give Me Love" - UNI 55117 - 1969
- The Good Vibrations - "In the Bad Bad Old Days (Before You Loved Me)" / "Shake A Hand" - Ember 14 310 AT - 1969
- Edison Lighthouse - "In the Bad Bad Old Days" / "In the Bad Bad Old Days" (Bell USA 45-116, promo) - 1971
- Gumbo - "In the Bad Bad Old Days (Before You Loved Me)" / "Let Me Tell Ya" - Bulldog Records BD 5 - 1975

== Charts ==
| Chart (1968–1969) | Peak position |
|---|---|
| Argentina | 16 |
| Canada | 23 |
| Ireland | 7 |
| New Zealand | 20 |
| UK | 8 |
