= The Mighty Hannibal =

American singer-songwriter and record producer (1939–2014)

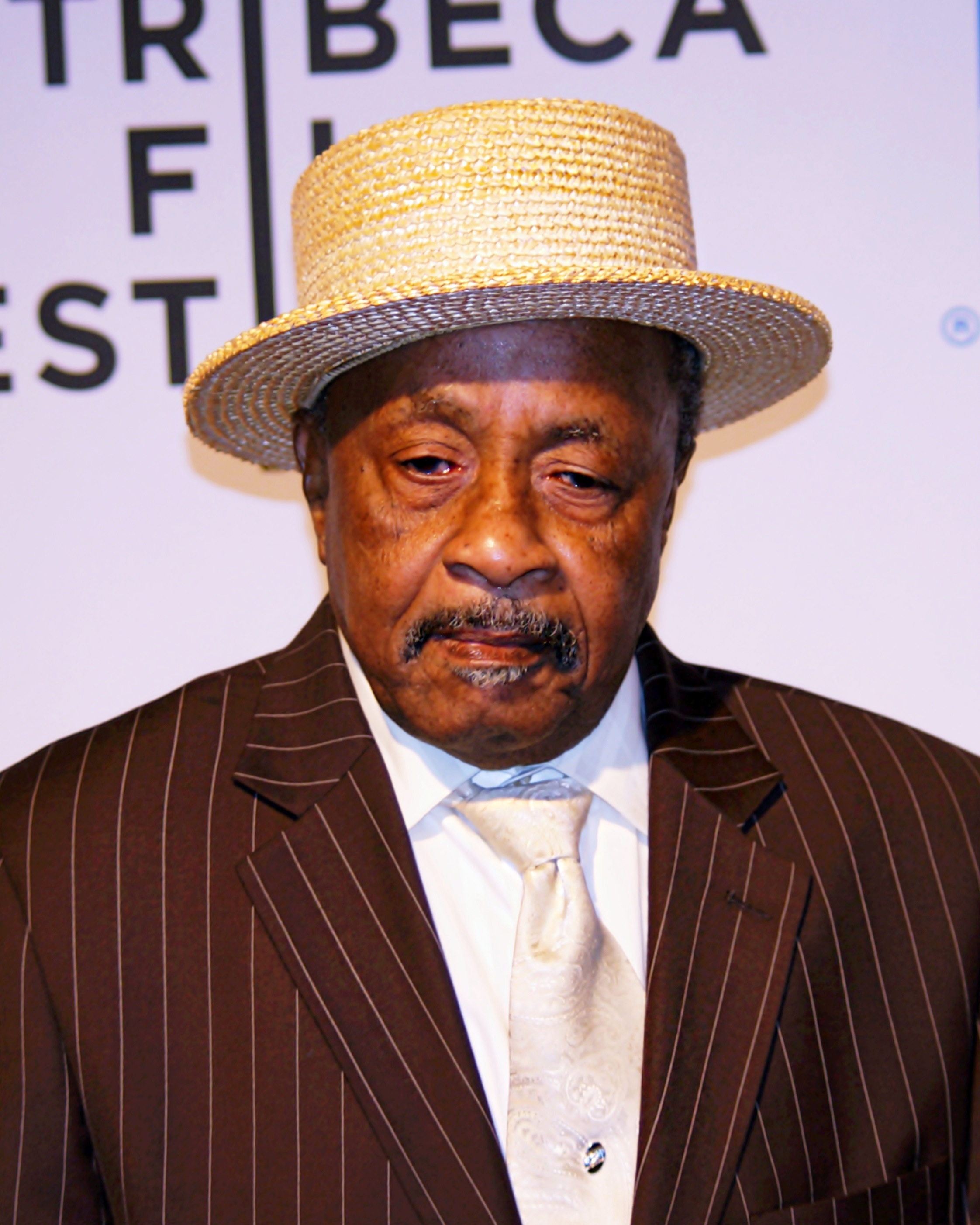
- Hannibal in 2011

Background information
- Also known as: Hannibal, King Hannibal
- Born: James Timothy Shaw; August 9, 1939; Atlanta, Georgia, U.S.
- Died: January 30, 2014 (aged 74) New York City, U.S.
- Genres: R&B, soul, funk
- Occupations: Singer, songwriter, record producer
- Instrument: Vocals
- Years active: 1954–2014
- Label: Various
- Formerly of: Johnny "Guitar" Watson
- Relatives: Vernon Jordan (cousin)

James Timothy Shaw (August 9, 1939 – January 30, 2014), known as The Mighty Hannibal, was an American R&B, soul, and funk singer, songwriter, and record producer. Known for his showmanship, and outlandish costumes often incorporating a pink turban, several of his songs carried social or political themes. His biggest hit was "Hymn No. 5", a commentary on the effects of the Vietnam War on servicemen, which was banned from being played on the radio.

== Background ==
James Timothy Shaw was born in Atlanta, Georgia, to Corrie Belle and James Henry Shaw. He was raised in the Vine City neighborhood of Atlanta. He started singing doo-wop as a teenager, and in 1954 he joined his first group, The Overalls. The outfit contained Shaw and Robert Butts plus Edward Patten and Merald "Bubba" Knight. The latter two later tasted success as part of Gladys Knight's backing group, The Pips. From that time, Shaw credited Grover Mitchell as his singing voice mentor. In 1958 Shaw moved to Los Angeles where, under the name of Jimmy Shaw, he recorded his debut solo single, "Big Chief Hug-Um An' Kiss-Um", a novelty song issued on the Concept label. This was followed by further releases including "The Biggest Cry", and "I Need a Woman ('Cause I'm a Man)". He was also known for his mid-1960s songs, "Jerkin' the Dog" and "Fishin' Pole".

== Career ==
Subsequently working as a singer with Johnny Otis, Shaw went on to sing in another group featuring H. B. Barnum and Jimmy Norman. At this time, he befriended both Johnny "Guitar" Watson and Larry Williams, before in 1959, and at the suggestion of Aki Aleong, adopting the name "Hannibal". He then released a small number of singles on the Pan World label. In 1962 he joined King Records, who released four further singles, the biggest seller being "Baby, Please Change Your Mind". Between 1962 and 1965 Hannibal also worked as a pimp in Los Angeles, a lifestyle that saw him dropped by King.

=== Mid-1960s recordings ===
He returned to Atlanta, and was recruited as the frontman by Dennis St. John and the Cardinals, who supported Tommy Roe at one gig. They ultimately backed Hannibal on most of his subsequent recordings with the Shurfine label, and played live engagements with Hannibal around Atlanta. Hannibal's first release with Shurfine was "Jerkin' the Dog" (1965), a modest success for a basic teen dance record. The similarly framed "Fishin' Pole" followed in 1966. The same year Hannibal adopted a more socially conscious stance. He stated "Me and my wife were watching the news and Walter Cronkite was talking about how all the soldiers were coming back from Vietnam addicted to opium." The couple penned "Hymn No. 5" in a short time space, and it duly became his best known recording, reaching No. 21 on the Billboard R&B chart.

=== Further activities ===
The success of "Hymn No. 5" brought however fueled a growing heroin addiction, and Hannibal spent eighteen months in prison for failing to pay a tax bill. Released from jail and free of drugs, he restarted his recording career in the early 1970s now billed as King Hannibal. He issued a number of singles and an album, Truth (1973), on the Aware label. His singles included "I'm Coming Home", another social comment on the ongoing Vietnam situation, and the anti-drug song, "The Truth Shall Make You Free (St. John 8:32)", a No. 37 R&B hit in 1973.

Finding a new direction with gospel based recordings, his songwriting nevertheless suffered in the late 1970s. Hannibal was employed as a cameo role actor, and on the staff as a record producer at Venture Records, before working on the Atlanta Voice newspaper. Hannibal recalled his odd blend of country, gospel and disco finding some success in the Netherlands with "Hoedown Disco" in the mid-1970s, but worse fortunes followed as Hannibal remained in relative obscurity until 1998. A CD album release, titled Who Told You That, gave his career some momentum, and in 2001 Norton Records released Hannibalism, a compilation album of songs written between 1958 and 1973. The 1998 cult film, Velvet Goldmine, also included fragments of his work.

=== Later years ===
Hannibal lost his eyesight in 2002 because of glaucoma. He was the subject of a documentary film, Showtime! (2009) directed by Ezra Bookstein. In December 2005, Hannibal was the Master of Ceremonies at Norton Records' New Year's Eve Rock N' Roll Show & Dance at Union Pool in Brooklyn. He continued to perform live, and enjoyed a 70th birthday celebration on stage in 2009. He contributed the following year on Elton John and Leon Russell's album, The Union, by co-writing the track "There's No Tomorrow".

== Family life ==
Hannibal was the cousin of Vernon Jordan, and was married to fellow soul singer, Delia Gartrell.

== Death ==
Hannibal died on January 30, 2014, at the age of 74 at St. Barnabas Hospital in The Bronx, New York, after experiencing breathing problems at his home.

== Discography ==
=== Albums ===
- Truth (1973)
- Who Told You That (1998)
- Hannibalism (2001) (compilation album)
- The Resurrection of the Mighty Hannibal (2007)

=== Chart singles ===
- "Hymn No. 5" (1966) - US R&B chart No. 21
- "The Truth Shall Make You Free" (1973) - US R&B chart No. 37
