= 2NUR =

Radio station at the University of Newcastle in Newcastle, Australia

Coordinates: 32.8918°S 151.5382°E

2NUR is an Australian radio station, licensed to, and serving Newcastle and its surrounds. It is a community radio station, licensed to the University of Newcastle. It operates at 103.7 megahertz on the FM band. Its callsign, 2NUR, stands for Newcastle University Radio, and the 2 is a standard prefix for radio stations in New South Wales.
