= Born to Live, Born to Die =

"Born To Live, Born To Die"

Single by The Foundations
- B-side: "Why Did You Cry ?"
- Released: 1969
- Genre: Pop
- Label: Pye, UK; Uni, US
- Songwriter(s): Eric Allandale, The Foundations
- Producer(s): Eric Allandale (musical director)

The Foundations singles chronology
"In the Bad Bad Old Days (Before You Loved Me)"	"Born To Live, Born To Die" (1969)	"Baby, I Couldn't See" (1969)

"Born To Live, Born To Die" was the last charting single for The Foundations. It made it to number 46 on the UK Singles Chart in September 1969. It was written by Foundations trombone player Eric Allandale and The Foundations. The B-side was composed by the group's organist Tony Gomez.

In the Netherlands it went to number 28 for one week.

== Editions ==
- The Foundations - "Born to Live, Born to Die" / "Why Did You Cry" - PYE 7N 17809 1969 - (UK)
- The Foundations - "Born to Live, Born to Die" / "Why Did You Cry" - UNI 55162 1969 - (US)
