= Marble Arch Records =

British record label

Marble Arch Records was a subsidiary of Pye Records that released budget records from 1964 to around 1980. Compact discs were also released from the late 1980s to around 1994.

== Background ==
Pye Records created this subsidiary label with in a type of a mini-album format, with a shorter run than the average LP album, to cater to a certain area of the buying public who would not buy regular albums because of the expense. The name came about because of a famous London location of the same name.

A number of Chess Records blues LPs were released on the Marble Arch label, usually having one track per side less than the original recording. Chess artists covered included Muddy Waters (Muddy Waters sings Big Bill), Bo Diddley, and Little Walter.
