= Take a Girl Like You (song) =

"Take A Girl Like You"

Single by The Foundations
- B-side: "I'm Gonna Be A Rich Man"
- Released: 1970
- Genre: Soul, Pop
- Label: Pye Records 7N 17904 (UK); Uni 55210 (USA)
- Songwriter(s): Bill Martin, Phil Coulter

The Foundations singles chronology
"Baby I Couldn't See" (1969)	"Take A Girl Like You" (1970)	"I'm Gonna Be A Rich Man" (1970)

Take A Girl Like You is a song by The Foundations. It was used as the title theme song for the 1970 Jonathan Miller directed film Take a Girl Like You that starred Hayley Mills and Oliver Reed. The B side of the single "Im Gonna Be A Rich Man" was written by Foundations lead singer Colin Young.

== Releases ==
- "Take A Girl Like You" / "I'm Gonna Be A Rich Man" - PYE 7N 17904
- "Take A Girl Like You" / "I'm Gonna Be A Rich Man" - UNI 55210

== Link ==
- https://www.imdb.com/title/tt0066436/soundtrack
