= Eddie Thornton =

Jamaican trumpeter (1931–2025)

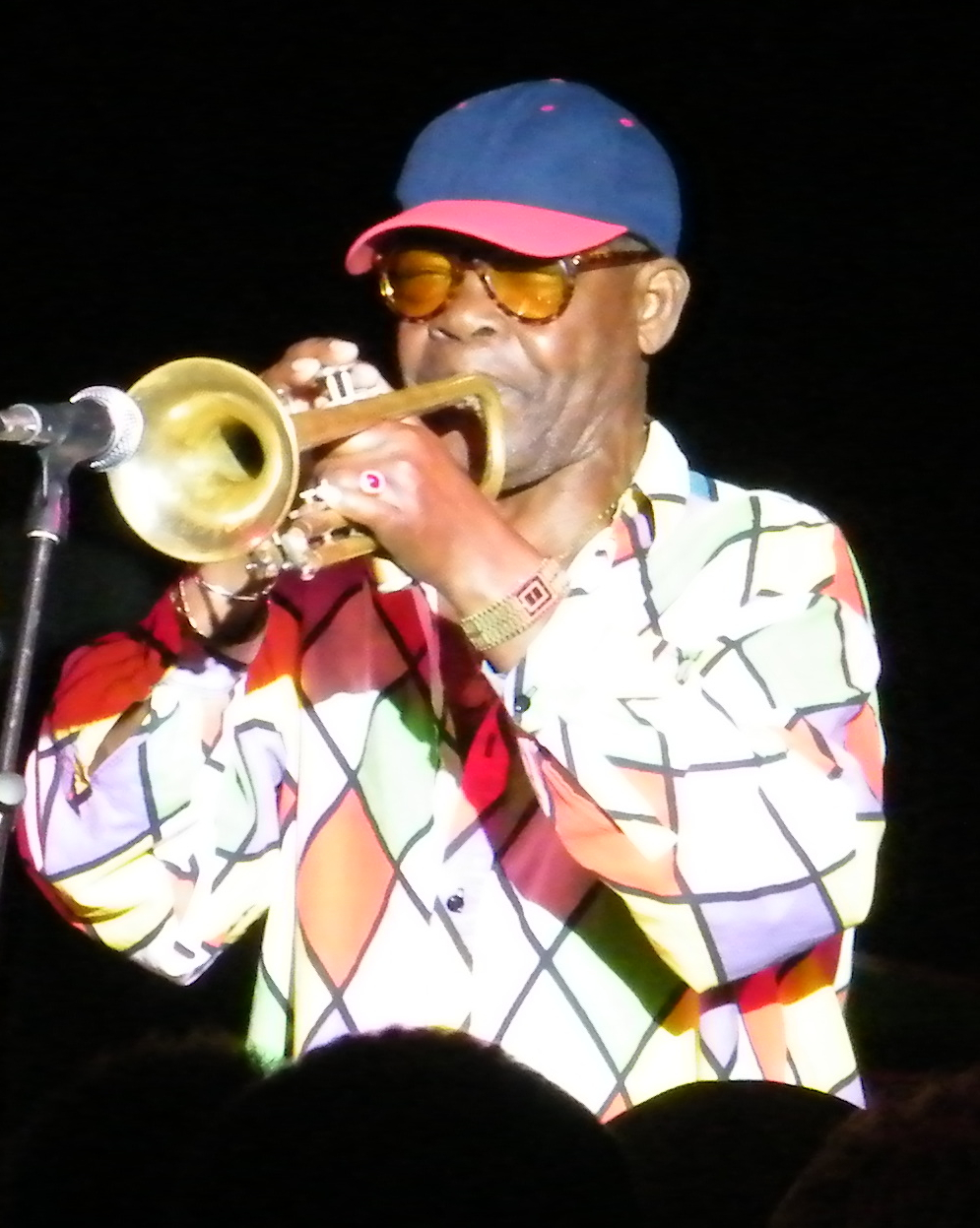
- Thornton performing in 2012

Background information
- Also known as: Tan Tan
- Born: Edward Thornton; 19 October 1931; Spanish Town, Colony of Jamaica
- Died: 10 December 2025 (aged 94) London, England
- Genres: Jazz, reggae
- Instrument: Trumpet
- Years active: 1950s–201?

Edward Thornton (19 October 1931 – 10 December 2025), better known as "Tan Tan", was a Jamaican-born trumpeter, whose career began in the 1950s.

== Life and career ==
Thornton was born in Spanish Town, Colony of Jamaica on 19 October 1931. He attended the Alpha Boys School. In the 1950s, he played in the Roy Coulton band (the first band to play live on Jamaican radio) along with Don Drummond. He toured worldwide with the group, backing a number of jazz stars, and settled in Europe, where he played with several bands including Georgie Fame and the Blue Flames in 1964, playing on several of their hits. He also performed with Georgie Fame and another friend of Rico Rodriguez in the BBC 4 Session: The Birth of Cool. He went on to play on The Beatles' "Got to Get You into My Life", and performed with Boney M. In 1975, Thornton played horn on Andy Fairweather Low's album, La Booga Rooga. In the late 1970s and early 1980s, he was part of the horn section for Aswad, as well as playing with King Sounds. He released a self-produced solo album in 1981, on which he was backed by The Cimarons. He later played with Jazz Jamaica, and Ska Cubano.

From 2008, he played with the band Kitty, Daisy & Lewis and featured on most of their albums. In February 2015 and autumn 2017, Thornton joined Kitty, Daisy & Lewis on their European tour accompanying a number of songs as a guest artist.

Thornton died at a hospice in London, on 10 December 2025, at the age of 94.

== Solo discography ==
- Musical Nostalgia for Today LP (1981), Maccabees/Rainbow
- "Theme From A Summer Place" 12" single (1981), Rough Trade
