= Dave Cash (DJ) =

British radio presenter

- Born: David Charles Wish; 18 July 1942; Bushey, Hertfordshire, England
- Died: 21 October 2016 (aged 74); Hollingbourne, Kent, England
- Notable work: Portraying a newsreader in Quadrophenia • Sunday show on BBC Local Radio • Cameo in The American Way • Co hosting The Kenny & Cash Show on Radio London and Capital Radio
- Spouses: Monica Evans (m. 1973; div. 2010); Sara Davies (m. 2011)
- Children: 2

Comedy career
- Years active: 1964 – 2016
- Medium: Radio, television

David Charles Wish (18 July 1942 – 21 October 2016), known as Dave Cash, was a British-Canadian radio presenter who latterly worked for BBC Radio Kent, having had previous spells at Radio London, BBC Radio 1, Capital London, Radio West (he was launch programme controller at the Bristol station), Invicta Radio, Country 1035 and PrimeTime Radio.

== Early life ==
David Charles Wish was born in Bushey, Hertfordshire in 1942. He grew up in Edgware, Middlesex, and when he was five, he and his family moved to Vancouver, British Columbia, Canada. Dave attended school there until he was eleven when he was sent back to the UK to continue his education as a boarder at the Royal Hospital School in Holbrook, Suffolk. According to his e-book He Sounds Much Taller: Memoirs of A Radio Pirate, this was not a particularly happy time for Dave. He felt like an outsider in both England and Canada.

When he was sixteen, he returned to Vancouver and went to the King Edward High School with plans to attend university. David's father died in 1962. Dave had also got his girlfriend pregnant around this time.

By 1964 he had two jobs: selling clothing during the day at Arnold & Quigley, then going around Vancouver radio stations, where he would do unpaid jobs for the stations. Eventually, he was commissioned to write some radio commercials for the clothing store.

== Career ==
=== Pirate radio: 1964–1966 ===
One of Dave's friend's in Vancouver was another expat Brit called Bill Street. In July 1964 Bill moved back to Britain and, in December, sent Dave a telegram raving about how exciting the music scene was, enthusing about the pirate stations and urging Dave to join him in the UK.

After selling his car for plane tickets and holding £17 in his pocket, on Christmas Eve 1964 Dave arrived in London, England, where he met programme director Ben Toney. Toney persuaded him to join the station as the afternoon DJ and writer for commercials, sailing out to the ship in January 1965 as the station's first replacement DJ for the presenters who had been on board for several weeks. Once on board with Radio London, Cash teamed up with Kenny Everett for the Kenny & Cash Show, amongst the most successful of all pirate radio programmes. His original payment was £15 a week.

Dave left Radio London in April 1966. Three things convinced him it was time to move on: he had become ill with kidney stones caused, he believed, by lime deposits in the ship's water supply; he had fallen in love with future wife Dawn; and his agent Chris Peers had found him other work - three shows a week on Radio Luxembourg and live gigs with Mecca Ballrooms. They would pay considerably better than Radio London. He said goodbye to his listeners in the ‘Big L column’ in Disc & Music Echo, on 30 April 1966. Later that year Dave was heard again on vinyl, introducing Geno Washington & the Ram Jam Band on their concert album Hand Clappin' Foot Stompin' Funky-Butt ... Live!.

=== Professional radio career: 1966–1979 ===
Cash joined Radio Luxembourg, then became one of the first-day DJs on BBC Radio One. Cash's popular Sunday show Cash At Four attracted guests such as Peter Sellers, Spike Milligan, John Cleese, Lady Antonia Fraser, Rolf Harris and David Bellamy.

Dave Cash hosted a few episodes of BBC TV series Top of the Pops; however, only the episode from 15 February 1968 (his second appearance) still survives. He co-hosted this edition with Jimmy Savile. Due to Savile's sexual abuse scandals, this particular episode has not been aired since 2008.

In 1969 Cash had a minor 'one hit wonder' with Groovy Baby, a top-thirty single novelty record inspired by Cash's broadcasting catchphrase, featuring the voice of a three-year-old, affectionately nicknamed 'Microbe'.

In 1970, Cash wrote and performed The Dave Cash Radio Program, a 26-part sitcom/music show produced at HTV and sold to the ITV network, NBC, and stations across Europe. Guests included Sammy Davis Jr., Richard Harris and Terry-Thomas. It was on this show that he met his third wife, actress Monica Evans, with whom he had two children.

In 1973, Cash started working at Capital Radio as production manager and presenter. He stayed at Capital for 21 years, reprising the Kenny & Cash Show, hosting a lunchtime quiz competition "Cash on Delivery" (COD) and the weekend programmes for Capital Gold. After the success of his best selling first novel The Rating Game, he left Capital in 1994 to concentrate on his writing.

In 1979, Cash appeared as himself in the cult hit Quadrophenia and took a cameo role alongside Dennis Hopper in The American Way. In 1988, he co-wrote and produced At Last It's Hogmanay with Billy Connolly and Robbie Coltrane for Channel 4.

=== Later work: 1979–2016 ===
Cash latterly worked for the BBC, broadcasting his weekend shows on Saturday (vintage charts from the years 1965-1995) and Sunday nights (country and rock and roll) to BBC Radio Kent, BBC Sussex, BBC Surrey, BBC Radio Solent, BBC Radio Berkshire and BBC Radio Oxford. His shows at BBC Kent were produced by Zach Daunt-Jones.

In 1991, Cash's first novel The Rating Game made the best-seller charts in four weeks followed in 1993 by All Night Long, and King of Clubs in 1995.

In 2006 he began working on a book designed to be both an autobiography and a history of pirate radio. He was also developing the first ever "triography": a biography written by Cash and his two best friends detailing their road trip to Mexico.

On 9 May 2011, One Media Publishing released a collection of over 1,000 albums compiled by Cash, featuring artists from a diverse range of musical genres, including Toni Braxton, Django Reinhardt, Usher, Aaliyah, The Troggs, Chaka Khan, Elvis Presley, Sham 69, Lou Reed and Jerry Lee Lewis. These albums are currently available via digital music stores only.

His last TV appearance was on episode 17 of Sky Art's Trailblazers documentary series (Trailblazers of Pop Radio), originally shown in 2016 and repeated on Freeview in 2021. His last show on the radio was on 16 October 2016, five days before his death, with his final song being Lady A's Need You Now.

== Personal life ==
Sometime in 1962, Cash got his girlfriend pregnant. Both the child and Cash's partners identities have never been publicly revealed. Cash was married three times. His first wife was called Dawn Lane, and they got married in 1969 and were divorced within a few years. In the early 1970s, Cash met Cindy Breakspeare in Jamaica, who would later be crowned Miss World 1976. From the very beginning, he was struck by her presence, and they went to a party together. In 1973, Cash met actress Monica Evans whilst working on his radio program, The Dave Cash Radio Program, and had two children with her.

On 4 December 2011, at Anna Maria Island in the U.S. state of Florida, Cash married Sara Davies (born 1957), they had originally met in 1989, and went on to appear on his BBC radio show where she was called 'Emily Email' and became a co-presenter. They lived in Hollingbourne, Kent.

== Death ==
Just five days after his final broadcast, Cash died suddenly on 21 October 2016 aged 74, after collapsing at his home. Cash was cremated, and in August 2017 his ashes were scattered by fellow DJ Johnnie Walker off the Harwich coast.
