= Errol Dixon =

American musician (1937–2023)

Errol Dixon (born Errol Barnes; 1937 – 31 January 2023) was a Jamaican-born singer and blues pianist.

Dixon was born in 1937 in Jamaica, and as a boy moved to New York. He later moved to London in 1957, where he started his music career.

In 1965, he played with the Ram Jam Band prior to Geno Washington joining. He recorded with them; the single "Shake Shake Senora" was released, but made no commercial impact.

During his career he released more than 15 albums and 30 singles.

From 2010, Dixon lived in the canton Schwyz, Switzerland. He died on a visit to Jamaica on 31 January 2023. He was 86.
