= Michael (the Lover) =

1965 soul song by The C.O.D.'s

Single by The C.O.D.'s
- B-side: "Cry No More"
- Released: 1965
- Genre: Soul
- Length: 2:35
- Label: Kellmac/One Derful; 1003
- Songwriter: Larry Brownlee
- Producer: Leon Singleton

"Michael (the Lover)" (Note: Sometimes written "Michael the Lover" or simply "Michael" (on the original C.O.D.'s single release).) is a soul song originally performed by American Chicago soul group the C.O.D.'s.

The song was written by the group's lead singer Larry Brownlee (Note: But credited to Brownlee, Lewis, and Washington on an Emase Records single.) who was murdered in 1978. It was released as a single on Kellmac Records in the United States and Stateside in the United Kingdom and made it to number 5 on the Hot Rhythm & Blues Singles chart in 1965. The song was produced by Leon Singleton and arranged by Pete Matthews.

The song was later remade by the Mad Lads, appearing on their 1966 album The Mad Lads In Action (Volt 414), and by the Northern soul Geno Washington & the Ram Jam Band (Piccadilly 7N 35359). Washington's version reached #39 on the UK charts. The 1980 song "Geno", a tribute to Washington and his band, notes "You were Michael the lover, the fighter who won".

== Geno Washington & the Ram Jam Band version ==
"Michael"

Song by Geno Washington & the Ram Jam Band
- A-side: "Michael"
- B-side: "(I Gotta) Hold On To My Love"
- Released: 1966
- Label: Piccadilly 7N.35359
- Composer: Larry Brownlee
- Producer: John Schroeder

Geno Washington & the Ram Jam Band singles chronology
"Que Sera, Sera" (1966)	"Michael" (1966)	"Always" (1967)

The version of Michael by Geno Washington & the Ram Jam Band became a chart hit for them but it also became a crowd favorite.

=== Background ===
It appeared on the Marble Arch compilation album, Stars of 67 which also featured "Puppet on a String" by Sandie Shaw and "Universal Soldier" by Donovan.

=== Chart ===
Their version got to #39 in February 1967. It also made its debut at on the Radio City City Sixty chart at no. 30 on the period of Sunday 29 January - Sunday 5 February 1967. It got to no. 15 the following week, but due to station owner, Dorothy Calvert being found guilty of operating a radio station inside UK territorial waters on February 8, 1967 and the station being closed that night, the single's course, as with other singles there would be unknown.

=== Other recordings ===
Other versions by Geno Washington & the Ram Jam Band includes a live version that appears on Hand Clappin, Foot Stompin, Funky-Butt ... Live! album. An unreleased version recorded by Geno Washington & the Ram Jam Band in 1968 appears on the Holdin' On With Geno Washington & The Ram Jam Band EP which was released on the Acid Jazz label in 2013.
