= H. W. Lawton =

H. W. Lawton may refer to:

- Harold Lawton (1899–2005), British scholar
- Henry Ware Lawton (1843–1899), American Army officer
