= Dryland (disambiguation) =

Drylands are ecoregions marked by aridity and low or unpredictable precipitation. Dry land is a figure of speech describing the parts of earth that are not ocean.

Dryland, drylands, dry land, or dry lands may also refer to:

- Dryland farming
- "Dry Land", 1975 song
- Drylands (novel), 1999 book by Thea Astley
- Dryland (club)
- The Dry Land, 2010 film
- Drylands (album), 2015 music album
- Dryland, a location in the 1995 film Waterworld
