= Ram Jam Inn =

Historic pub in Stretton, Rutland, England

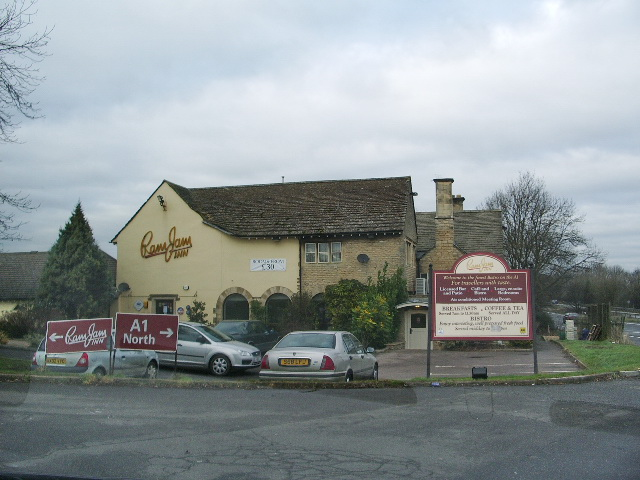
- The pub in December 2007

- Location within England

General information
- Type: Public house
- Location: Greetham, Rutland, England
- Coordinates: 52°43′58″N 0°36′2″W

The Ram Jam Inn was a historic pub in the civil parish of Greetham, Rutland, England, located on the west side of the Great North Road (now the A1), near Stretton, about 7 miles north of Stamford.

The pub closed in August 2013, and it was eventually demolished in November 2022. In November 2024, its grounds were re-used for three buildings, housing Wendy's and Brightside Roadside, with the third to open as a Costa Coffee at a later date.

== History ==
The Ram Jam Inn originally opened as a coaching inn called the Winchelsea Arms, but became known as the Ram Jam Inn by the early 19th century. It was frequented by the highwayman Dick Turpin in the 18th century, and it is claimed that one of his confidence tricks inspired the pub's name.

Turpin was a temporary lodger at the inn, and resided here when he first found notoriety. He showed his landlady, Mrs Spring, how to draw mild and bitter ale from a single barrel, stating "ram one thumb in here whilst I make a hole ... now jam your other thumb in this hole while I find the forgotten spile pegs." Turpin subsequently disappeared without paying his bill, while Spring was trapped with two thumbs in the barrel.

An alternative, similar, account is that an unnamed con-artist, not specifically named as Turpin, made the landlord fall for the trick so the trickster could try and seduce the landlady. A third tale is that by the 19th century "ram-jam" was a term that meant both eating to capacity and a place full of people.

In The Great North Road (1974), Norman W. Webster writes: "Its original name was the Winchilsea [sic] Arms but by the middle of the eighteenth century it was generally known as the Ram Jam. This striking name was the basis of its success for, although it was never a posting house of any importance, its memorable title established it as a land-mark on the Great North Road, contemporary topographers referring to the spot as Ram Jam House.

The title derives from the name of a spirit sold by an officer's servant newly returned from India; he called it Ram Ján, the name for an Indian servant, and as such it achieved a similar kind of fame to that of Stilton Cheese sold down the road. Imaginative legends have been invented to explain the curious title, the present sign showing a man stopping the holes of a cask with his fingers. The original spirit has not been sold here since the early years of the nineteenth century, the secret of the recipe having been lost or forgotten." Webster adds that the Ram Jam was one of three "half-way inns" providing sustenance and a change or horses between Stamford and Grantham, but was at the time of writing the only one to have retained its license as an inn.

In 1878, Hugh Lowther, 5th Earl of Lonsdale ran 100 miles from Knightsbridge Barracks to the inn in under 18 hours in order to win a bet.

Soul singer Geno Washington claims that he named his backing band the Ram Jam Band after the pub, as it was a popular place for the band to stop en route to gigs. But it was the Ram Jam Band's founder Pete Gage who named the band before Geno was invited to join as their singer.

When reviewing the inn in March 2000, The Telegraph's Paddy Burt described the meals as "simple food, well done". The novelist Margaret Drabble enjoyed staying at the inn, noting that the double glazing effectively masked the sound of traffic on the A1.

Immediately to the south of the inn's site is the Ram Jam Service Station, a petrol station with some amenities, serving northbound traffic only.

== Closure and demolition ==
The pub closed in August 2013, and was put on the market for an estimated value of £550,000.

In June 2019 it was considered for listing but this was decided against as it had had significant alterations.

In October 2018 Rutland County Council refused a planning application for the pub's demolition by Godwin Developments. The developer submitted fresh plans for demolition in February 2020. These plans were approved, but then put on hold in November 2021.

In September 2020 an "urban exploration" including numerous photographs of the abandoned site was published on the Derelict Places website. By December 2022 the entire site had been cleared.
