= Dry Land =

Single by Joan Armatrading

from the album Back to the Night
- B-side: "Body to Dust"
- Released: 28 November 1975
- Recorded: May 1975
- Genre: Pop
- Length: 4:22
- Label: A&M
- Songwriters: Joan Armatrading & Pam Nestor
- Producer: Pete Gage

Joan Armatrading singles chronology
"Back to the Night" (1975)	"Dry Land" (1975)	"Love and Affection" (1976)

"Dry Land" is a 1975 song written by Joan Armatrading and Pam Nestor. It was released as an album track on Back to the Night in May 1975 and then as a single (AMS 7205) on 28 November 1975. The song has a simple arrangement, with a solo vocal, a number of choral-style backing vocals, an acoustic piano, and a Moog synthesizer. All of these were performed by Armatrading herself, with the exception of the Moog, which was played by her producer, Pete Gage.

== History ==
"Dry Land" was originally released on Armatrading's second studio album Back to the Night in May 1975. (A&M Records). The song was recorded at Basing Street Studios in Notting Hill, London, now known as Sarm West Studios. It is generally believed that Armatrading wrote the music for the song and Nestor wrote the lyrics, though this is not clear cut. At the time of the song's composition, Armatrading and Nestor were engaged in writing many songs together, eventually writing over a hundred of them, and both of them wrote music and lyrics, played piano, and sang. At the time of the recording of Back to the Night, the album's producer, Pete Gage, remarked: "as soon as I heard Pam Nestor play – there's one number, it was the blueprint for Dry Land, there's no doubt about it, Joan had actually learnt bits and pieces of Pam's piano playing". The song was said to be Gage's favourite track from the album, and he described it as "a very sensitive number".

After its release as an album track and single, "Dry Land" was re-released on several collections of Armatrading's work: Live at the Bijou Cafe, (1977); Love and Affection, (1996); Love and Affection: Joan Armatrading Classics 1975–1983 (2003); and Joan Armatrading: Gold (2005).

"Dry Land" was a favourite of DJ John Peel and appears on the compilation album Kat's Karavan: The History Of John Peel On The Radio.

== Critical reception ==
Upon its release as a single, Alex Gordon of the Harborough Mail stated, "One of our biggest up-and-coming talents with a solidly compelling chunk of emotion from her superb album Back to the Night." Martin Lilleker of the Darlington Evening Despatch wrote, "Just listen to her deep sexy vocals on this ballad and I am sure you will realise she is worth a lot of time and listening."

== Covers ==
The song was covered by Irish singer Freddie White and released on his album Do You Do in 1981.
