= Mudmen (disambiguation) =

Mudmen are a Canadian rock band.

Mudmen or Mud Men may also refer to:

- Asaro Mudmen, a Papua New Guinean tribe
- Mud Men (TV series), a 2011 British factual TV series
- Mudmen (instrumental), an instrumental track from Pink Floyd's 1972 album Obscured By Clouds

== See also ==
- Mudman (disambiguation)
