= Johnny Vaughan =

English television and radio presenter

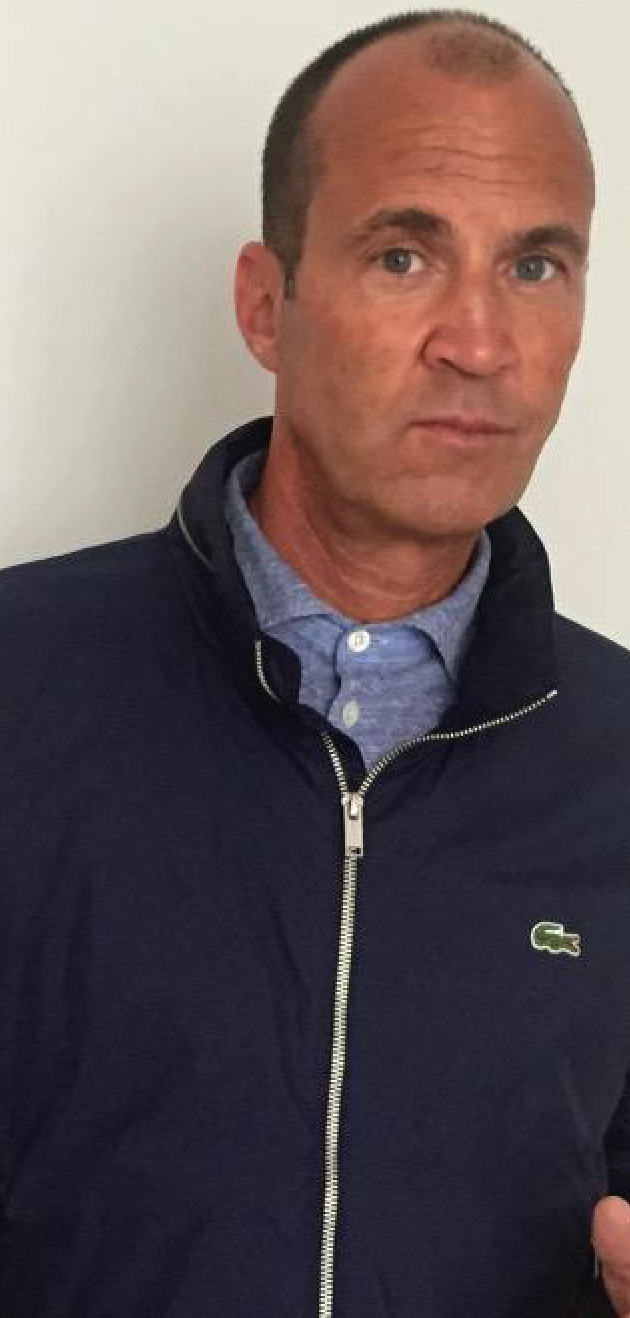
- Vaughan in 2023
- Born: Jonathan Randal Vaughan; 16 July 1966 (age 60); Barnet, London, England
- Years active: 1993–present
- Known for: The Big Breakfast, Capital Breakfast with Johnny Vaughan
- Spouse: Antonia Davies (m. 1999; div. 2014)
- Partner(s): Vanessa Howard (2017–present)
- Children: 3

Jonathan Randal Vaughan (born 16 July 1966) is an English television and radio presenter and a film critic. He was the main presenter of Capital Breakfast alongside Lisa Snowdon on 95.8 Capital FM between 2004 and 2011.

Vaughan currently presents the Radio X drivetime show, weekdays from 4 pm to 7 pm (commonly referred to on air as The 4til7 Thang) and The Kickabout every Saturday from 11 am to 1 pm. Vaughan also writes a weekly column in The Sun newspaper reviewing recent film releases.

== Early life ==
Vaughan was born in Barnet, Greater London, to an engineer father, Randal, and a psychotherapist mother, Fay.

== Education ==
Vaughan went to St Andrew's Primary School in Totteridge, Barnet and private boarding schools, Bramcote School, Gamston, Nottinghamshire and Uppingham School, Rutland. During his school years he showed a talent for comedy, playing the violin and singing.

== Early adult life and imprisonment ==
On leaving school, Vaughan moved back to London and originally wanted to become a writer. He ended up with a variety of jobs ranging from a grill chef to even starting his own business selling boxer shorts.

In 1988, aged 21, Vaughan was arrested for trying to sell £15,000 of cocaine to undercover police officers in a hotel on the M1 motorway near Northampton. After his initial success with Moviewatch, Vaughan said in interviews, including one with Mayfair magazine, that he had been incarcerated for the distribution of pornographic videotapes.

Latterly, Vaughan recalled the event in an interview with the Daily Telegraph,

One night, an old schoolfriend, a student, called and asked him if he had any drug connections; the friend had met somebody who wanted to know. (The somebody, it turned out, was a drug dealer who had been arrested and was now working for the police.) No, said Vaughan, he didn't.

'The next day,' Vaughan says, 'I do bump into someone. He calls me and says, "Tell your friend it's all sorted."' Vaughan arranged the meeting at a service station on the M1, and went there to introduce the protagonists. He was slammed against a wall by a policeman who asked him how old he was. When Vaughan said 21, the cop said, "You won't be seeing sunshine again until you're 36."

He was given a four-year jail sentence for dealing cocaine, served at HMP Stocken in Stretton, Rutland. On release from prison, Vaughan started a job working as a journalist for the Peterborough Herald newspaper, reporting on legal cases in his column, Johnny Vaughan in the Courts.

== Early career ==
His big break came in 1993 when he visited a friend's production company and through a chance meeting was offered a job with Channel 4. He started his television career presenting the movie review show Moviewatch, as well as the music show Naked City and his own chat show Here's Johnny. He also hosted a late night show, Fabulous, on the old iteration of BBC Radio 5 in 1993.

== The Big Breakfast ==
Channel 4 producers decided he was a natural in front of the camera, and in light of ailing viewing figures he was chosen to front The Big Breakfast from 1997 until 2001, forming a successful partnership with former programme weather girl and actress Denise van Outen from 1998. Van Outen's cheeky "Essex girl" personality played off well against the quick wit of Vaughan, and together they recovered audience figures to record levels. One feature of Vaughan's presentation was the way in which he frequently interacted with the various cameramen and technical people in the studio, turning some of them into popular characters in their own right. His ability to build a rapport with regulars from different walks of life such as Trevor Baylis, Mark Bright and Drusilla Beyfus, as well as the depth of knowledge he revealed in his Shed interviews, established him as something of a polymath. Also notable was that each programme finished with a zany situational competition in which Johnny revealed considerable talent as a character actor. In parallel with The Big Breakfast Vaughan presented another film show, The Johnny Vaughan Film Show.

Van Outen left to pursue her acting career at the end of 1998. The partnership with replacement model Kelly Brook failed to reproduce the chemistry between Vaughan and van Outen, and audience figures "plummeted". Brook was replaced by Liza Tarbuck and van Outen returned again as main female presenter in 2000 but the show was unrevivable. Vaughan and van Outen left the show in January 2001 after both their contracts had run out.

== Move to the BBC ==
In 2001, the BBC reportedly paid Vaughan £2.5 million to leave Channel 4. He transferred to the BBC to present a late-night talk show, Johnny Vaughan Tonight in the same vein of American shows by Johnny Carson and Jay Leno. Viewing figures were good (the show regularly received 2.5 – 3 million viewers a night) and commentators suggested that the format was best suited to the free-wheeling Vaughan. However, a highly promoted BBC Two sitcom vehicle 'Orrible, which Vaughan wrote and acted in, was poorly received by the critics. The show lost 40% of its audience over its first three episodes and was not renewed for a second series.

In October 2003 he devised, produced and was the first presenter of BBC Radio 5 Live's Fighting Talk, a sport-related comedy show. Further television appearances ensued, when Vaughan tried a revival of his on screen relationship with van Outen in 2004 in the BBC's Saturday night family show Passport to Paradise, which lasted for one series. During this period at the BBC, Vaughan also co-hosted 12 episodes of Superstars (British TV programme), a revival of the hugely popular sports competition which ran on British TV from 1973 to 1985.

== 95.8 Capital FM ==
On 2 April 2004, Vaughan moved to radio and returned to the "zoo" format, when he replaced Chris Tarrant as the presenter of Capital Breakfast on 95.8 Capital FM, which saw the listening figures for his show drop from over 1.3 million to 980,000 listeners, according to RAJAR statistics.

In January 2008, Vaughan was reunited with van Outen when she joined him on the breakfast show in a move to boost listening figures, but she left the show halfway through her contract in June 2008. In August 2008, van Outen was replaced by model Lisa Snowdon. The show rose in the ratings, reclaiming the top spot of London's breakfast radio chart in October 2008, with an average weekly audience of 862,000 listeners. In 2010–11, his breakfast show had regular audiences in excess of 1 million. On 18 November 2011, Vaughan left Capital Breakfast, and was replaced by Dave Berry.

== talkSPORT & Radio X ==
In August 2013, it was announced Vaughan had signed for Talksport hosting a new show for Saturday morning from 11 am to 1 pm called the Warm Up alongside friends James Brown and Gavin Woods. The show looked ahead to the weekend's football action and went head to head with Vaughan's former show Fighting Talk on BBC Radio 5 Live. Alongside this role, he also covered for Colin Murray in his 10am – 1pm slot when he was unavailable. His last show on Talksport was on 19 September 2015 leaving Talksport to host the new drivetime show from 4pm to 7pm as part of the new weekday daytime lineup on Radio X.

== Other work ==
Vaughan wrote the UK's first "dope opera", Top Buzzer, which aired in 2004 on MTV and later on Five. Vaughan has also been heavily involved with telethon charity drives such as Children in Need, Comic Relief and Sport Relief. In 2004 the BBC ran "a search to find the nation's best-loved sitcom" with a format that aped that of the 100 Greatest Britons. One celebrity championed each of the top ten sitcoms, presenting an hour-long special on why their favourite was the best. Vaughan was the presenter of the segment on prison-based sitcom Porridge.

In 2005, Vaughan became the host of the American reality/game show My Kind of Town on ABC. The show was cancelled after four episodes. He was also featured in the 2005 film Deuce Bigalow: European Gigolo, playing an awards ceremony host.

Vaughan presented the controversial hoax "reality" show Space Cadets for Channel 4. In June 2006, Vaughan appeared as a guest on TV Heaven, Telly Hell. He was a team captain on the Channel 4 comedy panel show Best of the Worst that also features team captain David Mitchell and chairman Alexander Armstrong.

In December 2006, Vaughan made a guest appearance on the BBC comedy panel game QI (Series D, Episode 10, "Divination"). Vaughan has his own television production company, "World's End". In 2009, he presented a Premier League Football DVD titled Johnny Vaughan's Own Goals & Gaffs III.

In 2011, Vaughan appeared in the TV show Mud Men on History Channel. Accompanied by Steve Brooker, he ventured out into the Thames shoreline in search of hidden artefacts and treasures.

During the London 2012 Olympics, Vaughan joined Absolute Radio to present the Olympic Drivetime show. As Absolute Radio was also the official station of the BT London Live concerts in Hyde Park, which were also held during the Games, Vaughan also participated in the on-stage presenting of the acts and interviews with Team GB athletes and medalists.

Vaughan participated in a 2018 episode of quiz show Pointless Celebrities, reaching the final round alongside fellow Radio X DJ Toby Tarrant.

In 2023 Vaughan reunited with his former colleague Denise Van Outen to present an episode of Steph's Packed Lunch.

== Personal life ==
Vaughan married his long-term partner costume designer Antonia Davies in August 1999. The couple met when he was working in a video store as a teenager. Elvis Costello performed at their wedding. In 2003, they lived in Wandsworth Common, South London. Vaughan's father-in-law was Nick Davies, once foreign editor of the Daily Mirror. They had two children and a bulldog. They divorced in 2014.

In March 1999, as a result of his experience of prison Catholic chaplains, Vaughan was received into the Catholic Church at Westminster Cathedral. He is a supporter of Chelsea F.C.

In July 2008, he shaved his head to raise money for the Capital Radio charity, "Help a London Child", of which he is an ambassador.
