= Water (Miller & Atkins song) =

Single by Geno Washington & the Ram Jam Band
- A-side: "Water"
- B-side: "Understanding"
- Released: April 29, 1966
- Genre: Soul
- Label: Piccadilly 7N.35312
- Composer(s): Miller, Atkins

Geno Washington & the Ram Jam Band singles chronology
"Shake Shake Senora" (1965)	"Water" (1966)	"Hi Hi Hazel" (1966)
- Shake Shake Senora is credited to The Ram Jam Band with Geno Washington

"Water" was the second single released by Geno Washington and the Ram Jam Band, but the first single that was credited to them as Geno Washington & the Ram Jam Band. It made the UK top 40 in 1966.

== Background ==
It was composed by Helen Miller and Roger Atkins. The single was first released in the UK on the Piccadilly label on April 29, 1966. It was backed with the song "Understanding" which was composed by Margaret Nash and Sam Gary, previously recorded by Johnny Nash. It was also released in the US on Congress CG-269.

=== Chart info ===
Their first charting hit, it spent at least eight weeks on the UK charts, peaking at #39 on May 19, 1966.
