= St Nicholas' Church, Stretton =

Church in Stretton, Rutland

Coordinates: 52°43′53″N 0°35′42″W

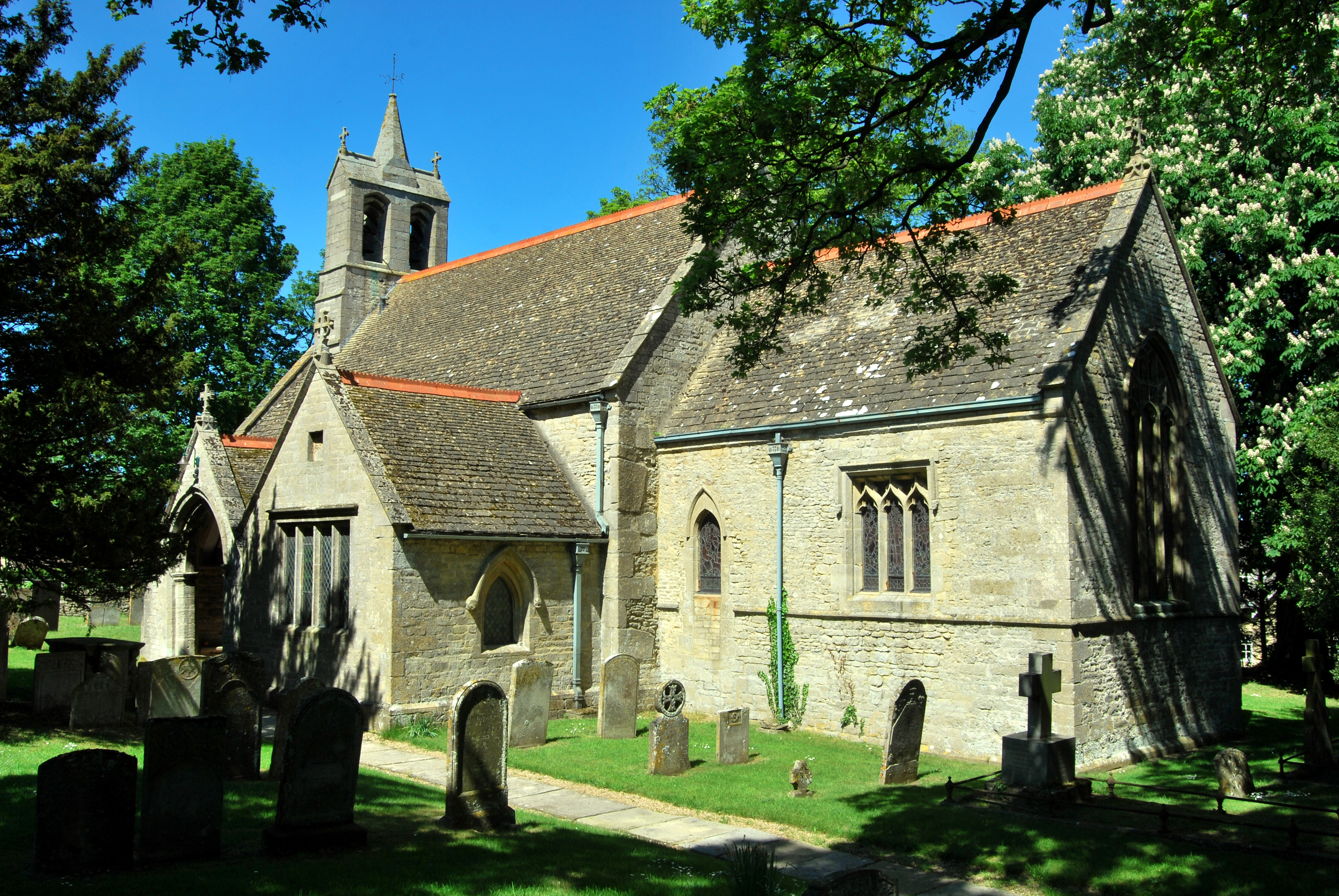
- Denomination: Church of England

History
- Dedication: St Nicholas

Administration
- Diocese: Peterborough
- Parish: Stretton, Rutland

Clergy
- Rector: Anthony Oram

St Nicholas' Church is a church in Stretton, Rutland. It is a Grade II* listed building.

== History ==
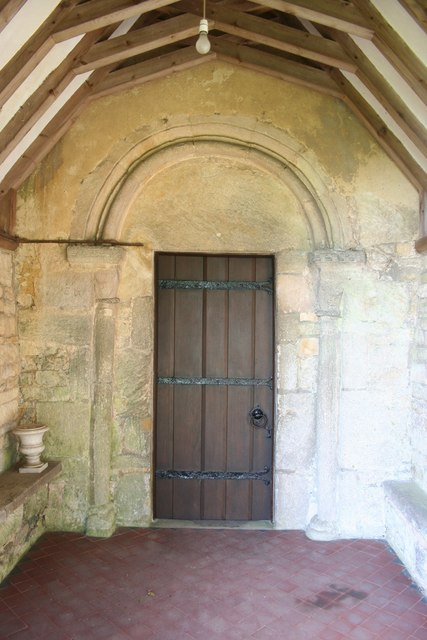
South doorway

The small church consists of nave with north aisle, chancel, north and south transepts and a south porch. There is no tower but a double bell-cote. It was built 1086-1185 when it was owned by the Knights Templar. Most of the church was built in the 13th century. A major Victorian restoration, by James Fowler of Louth, took place in 1881. The two bells date from 1663 and 1710. Most of the stained glass in the windows is by Clayton and Bell.

Edward Bradley (rector of Stretton, 1871–83), who wrote as Cuthbert Bede, and who funded its restoration, is buried in the churchyard.

== Sources ==
This article incorporates text from a publication now in the public domain: Seccombe, Thomas (1901). "Bradley, Edward". In Lee, Sidney (ed.). Dictionary of National Biography (1st supplement). London: Smith, Elder & Co.
