= Back to the Night =

Studio album by Joan Armatrading
- Released: April 1975
- Studio: Rockfield, Monmouthshire; Morgan, London; Basing Street, London
- Genre: Pop
- Length: 41:42
- Label: A&M
- Producer: Pete Gage

Joan Armatrading chronology
Whatever's for Us (1972)	Back to the Night (1975)	Joan Armatrading (1976)

Back to the Night is the second studio album by the British singer-songwriter Joan Armatrading. The album was released in April 1975 by A&M Records (AMLH 68305).

== Musical background ==
Musically, the album shows a development of the mood of Armatrading's first album Whatever's for Us, and explores different aspects of her talent and musical leanings, as it encompasses elements of folk, jazz, calypso and up-tempo songs. Because of this a number of musicians were hired, so they could reflect the variety of styles Armatrading was coming up with.

The album features some experienced musicians, notably Jean Roussel, Colin Pincott, and Andy Summers. The album was promoted on tour with a six-piece jazz-pop group called The Movies.

== General background ==
Following the release of her debut album, Whatever's for Us, a collaboration with lyricist Pam Nestor, Armatrading ended her contract with Cube Records and signed instead with A&M. Back to the Night was recorded in 1974 at Basing Street Studios, London; Morgan Studios, London; and Rockfield Studios, Monmouthshire. It was mixed at Basing Street Studios, London, and mastered at Sterling Sound, New York.

While making Back to the Night, Armatrading realised she could make a career out of music, and her experiences during the recording of the album convinced her to apply herself to the task of doing so. Before this album, Armatrading had simply wanted to be a songwriter. She was a reluctant singer and performer and did not want to sing on Back to the Night telling producer Pete Gage: "The problem is, I don't want to be a singer ... I want to be a songwriter, I just want to write songs, but I want other people to sing the songs."

The making of the album was a difficult experience for Gage. He had been hired by Mike Stone, an American promoter, who was then acting as Armatrading's manager. Stone described Armatrading as being "very difficult" following the departure of Pam Nestor, but nevertheless having "immense talent". Gage himself was struck by Armatrading's musical ability, describing her as "having a huge amount of natural talent". Armatrading found it difficult to make the album, partly because of her reluctance to perform and partly because she was unhappy during this time, later saying that she had "been going through a bad period". Gage went out of his way to recruit musicians for the album who would be "sympathetic" and "patient".

In the studios, Armatrading was frequently absent-minded and would sometimes walk out, forget where she was supposed to be, and wander off. Because of this, Gage eventually lost his patience with her and while driving Armatrading to Paddington Station so that she could catch the train to visit a friend in Reading, he gave her a dressing down, telling her she should think herself lucky to have musicians and studios at her disposal and that many artists would give a great deal to be in her position. Gage's remarks helped Armatrading to "grow up" and made her realise that she could in fact be a performer and make a living from music, something she had previously not considered.

Armatrading herself did not like the album at the time, and "practically disowned it", dismissing it as "a load of rubbish" and "a waste of time", saying that she hadn't done some things very well because of her state of mind and unhappiness at the time of the album's making.

The photographs that appear on the album cover are in silhouette at the insistence of Armatrading. At the time she would not agree to be photographed, saying: "I don't want my picture on the cover of the album, it'll have to be something else." The only way the photographer, Clive Arrowsmith, could persuade her was to agree to take profile shots and shade the images so her face couldn't be seen.

== Songs ==
Many of the songs arose from Armatrading's experience of touring in the US following the release of Whatever's for Us. Sean Mayes notes in his biography of Armatrading that while Joan was playing in the Bronx, New York, she stayed in a hotel in Times Square and would often walk the streets around the hotel late at night, after a performance. It was through this that she acquired her love of "night people", encountering "beggars, buskers … and Vietnam veterans with bits of their arms and legs missing". It was the people she met that provided the background for the songs on Back to the Night, for example, the song "No Love For Free" being about the prostitutes Armatrading encountered on her wanderings around the Bronx. "Cool Blue Stole My Heart" recalls a holiday Armatrading had in Amsterdam. Armatrading mentions during a live concert released as the Steppin' Out DVD that she began writing the song in Amsterdam and finished it in London three months later.

The majority of the songs on the album were written by Joan Armatrading, though two (the tracks "Dry Land" and "Come When You Need Me") were a carry over from her collaboration with lyricist Pam Nestor, which had begun with Armatrading's debut album Whatever's for Us.

Several tracks from Back to the Night subsequently appeared on many compilation albums: "Steppin' Out", "Dry Land", "Cool Blue Stole My Heart", and "Come When You Need Me". Two songs from the album, "Cool Blue Stole My Heart" and "Steppin' Out", were included in the set list for Armatrading's seminal concert at Studio L in Cologne, known as the Rockpalast, in February 1979, and were also included in the live album Steppin' Out released in that year.

The song "Dry Land" was said to be the favourite track of the album's producer, Pete Gage, who described it as "a very sensitive number", saying: "I loved that song". "Dry Land" was released as a single (AMS 7205) in 1976.

The song "Back to the Night" was later re-released as a re-mix version in November 1983 as the b-side of the single "Heaven" (AM 162) from the compilation album Track Record.

== Reception ==
The album was a critical rather than a commercial success and did not sell in large numbers.

A review in Record Mirror referred to the album's "indefinable magic" and music that's "a lot funkier" than her debut album and stated, "Joan Armatrading is quietly destroying musical barriers, providing something fresh and invigorating that's flavoured by lingering touches of Soul, Blues, Folk and the sounds of Joan's Caribbean birth-place; the result is one of the most compelling artists working in Britain today."

In a retrospective review for AllMusic, Dave Connolly commented: "While it's not a markedly better record than Whatever's for Us, [...] it's on this record that glimpses of the greatness to come appear: the upbeat island feel of "Travel So Far," the powerfully intimate "Dry Land," and the inventive melodies of the title track."

Steve York, who played bass guitar on the album, commented that "it was not a commercial success but it is a highly original and interesting album. Joan is a unique writer with a distinctive voice."

Wilfrid Mellers, writing in Angels of the Night, stated that "the tone is bold, the rhythms sprightly and the phrasing clipped" and singled out the songs "Travel So Far" and "Steppin' Out" as "reggae-style peans to freedom".

According to the A&M website, Back to the Night was voted one of the top ten albums of 1975 by English music critics.

== Track listing ==
All songs written by Joan Armatrading, except where indicated.

=== Side 1 ===
1. "No Love For Free" 3:28
  - Joan Armatrading – vocals, guitar
2. "Travel So Far" 3:07
  - Joan Armatrading – vocals, 12-string guitar
  - Jean Roussel – piano, organ
  - Pete Gage – guitars
  - Steve York – bass
  - John Halsey – drums
  - Shamsi Sarumi – Afro percussion
3. "Steppin' Out" 4:03
  - Joan Armatrading – vocals, rhythm guitar
  - Jean Roussel – piano, organ
  - Bernie Holland – lead guitar
  - Andy Summers – additional lead guitar
  - Phil Chen – bass
  - Tony Newman – drums
  - Gaspar Lawal – congas
4. "Dry Land" (Armatrading, Pam Nestor) 4:19
  - Joan Armatrading – vocals, piano
  - Pete Gage – Moog
5. "Cool Blue Stole My Heart" 5:32
  - Joan Armatrading – vocals, acoustic guitar
  - Jean Roussel – piano, organ, Moog
  - Pete Gage – electric guitar
  - Steve York – bass
  - Ron Mathewson – double bass
  - Tony Carr – drums
  - Shamsi Sarumi – percussion

=== Side 2 ===
1. "Get in Touch With Jesus" 3:39
  - Joan Armatrading – vocals, electric and acoustic guitars
2. "Body To Dust" 4:19
  - Joan Armatrading – vocals, acoustic guitar
  - Jean Roussel – piano
  - Ron Mathewson – double bass
  - Tony Carr – drums
  - Shamsi Sarumi – congas
3. "Back to the Night" 4:02
  - Joan Armatrading – vocals
  - Jean Roussel – piano, Moog
  - Pete Gage – guitar
  - Colin Pincott – guitar
  - Phil Chen – bass
  - Tony Newman – drums
  - Gaspar Lawal – Afro percussion
4. "So Good" 3:26
  - Joan Armatrading – vocals, electric and acoustic guitars
  - Chris Kerran – tablas
  - Steve York – harmonica
  - Dave Brooks – tenor saxophone
  - Shamsi Sarumi – Afro percussion
5. "Let's Go Dancing" 2:03
  - Joan Armatrading – vocals, acoustic guitar
  - Jean Roussel – Moog
  - Ron Mathewson – double bass
6. "Come When You Need Me" (Armatrading, Nestor) 3:44
  - Joan Armatrading – vocal, piano
  - Ron Mathewson – double bass
  - Gerry Conway, Tony Carr and Pete Gage – percussion effects

== Production personnel ==
- Producer: Pete Gage
- Engineers: Phill Brown, Phil Ault, Robin Black
- Re-mix Engineer: Phill Brown
- Arrangements: Joan Armatrading, Pete Gage
- Art Direction: Fabio Nicoli
- Photography: Clive Arrowsmith
- Additional Personnel: Elkie Brooks, Lynn Taylor, Rod Thear, Mike Stone

Recorded at Basing Street Studios, London, Morgan Studios, London and Rockfield Studios, Monmouthshire Mixed at Basing Street Studios, London; mastered at Sterling Sound, New York City
