= Double "A" =

Studio album by The Movies
- Released: 1977
- Studios: Advision Studios, London
- Genres: Soft rock, latin, pop
- Label: GTO
- Producer: Ray Singer

The Movies chronology
The Movies (1975)	Double "A" (1977)	Bullets Through the Barrier (1978)

Double "A" was the second album by UK band The Movies, released in 1977. The album was produced by Ray Singer, with additional production by James Guthrie at Utopia Studios, Primrose Hill.

== Track listing ==
All tracks composed by Jon Cole; except where indicated

Side 1

1. "Heaven on the Street"
2. "Yo Yo"
3. "True Love Trouble" (Julian Diggle)
4. "Rumour"
5. "Playground Hero"

Side 2

1. "Big Boys band"
2. "Boogaloo"
3. "She's a Be-bopper"
4. "Living the Life"
5. "Chasing Angels"

== Personnel ==
The Band

- Jon Cole - lead vocals, guitar
- Julian Diggle - percussion, harmonica, lead vocals on "True Love Trouble"
- Greg Knowles - lead guitar, backing vocals
- Jamie Lane - drums, percussion, backing vocals
- Dave Quinn - bass
- Mick Parker - keyboards, clarinet, backing vocals

Additional musicians

- Stan Sulzmann - soprano saxophone on "True Love Trouble"
- Ray Warleigh - alto saxophone on "She's a Be-Bopper"
- Richard Niles - brass arrangements

Production

- Produced by Ray Singer
- Engineers: Paul Hardiman, James Guthrie
- Producer/Engineer for additional overdubs & mix: James Guthrie
