= Pam Nestor =

British musician and actress

- Born: Pamela Agatha Nestor; 28 April 1948 (age 78); Berbice, Guyana
- Genres: Pop, reggae
- Occupations: Singer, songwriter, actress
- Instruments: Vocals, piano
- Years active: 1964–1979
- Labels: Cube Records, Sun Star Records, Tempus Records, Chrysalis Records

Pamela Agatha Nestor (born 28 April 1948) is a former singer, songwriter and actress who was active in the entertainment industry in the 1960s and 1970s. She left the music industry in 1979 and in later life took to academic pursuits, gaining a doctorate in 2009 from Birkbeck College, University of London.

== Early life ==
Nestor was born in Berbice, Guyana, on 28 April 1948. While at school in Guyana, she began to write poetry and eventually won a poetry competition. She moved to England in 1961 and at the age of 14 lived in Muswell Hill, London, with her mother and younger sister. She was described in 1977 by the music journalist Nick Kent as: "very, very pretty", with a "gorgeous ebony face … warm lively eyes and a contagious smile", and her personality as "effervescent [and] fizzing with drive"; and later, in 1990, by the author Sean Mayes as "pretty" and "petite" with an "infectious, bubbling personality" and "irrepressibly outspoken". She was a free spirit, in her own words: "crazy, tough, intense, idealistic". By the age of 16 she had fronted several semi-pro soul bands around London, and was a single mother with two children by the age of 19.

== Hair and partnership with Joan Armatrading ==
In 1969 she successfully auditioned for the touring production of the musical Hair and was offered a part. She is said to have loved being in Hair, 'revelling in the ... hippy philosophy' and the experience informed her lyric writing. The singer and musician Joan Armatrading also obtained a part in the musical, and the two became friends. One day in their lodgings while on tour, Nestor showed her some of her poems and Armatrading set them to music, and so their writing partnership was born. They spent a year on the road writing songs together. They later recorded some demo tapes on a tape recorder in a bedroom, and Nestor took charge of trying to get the tapes accepted by a publishing company. Their original intention was to secure a contract as songwriters rather than performers. Nestor was reportedly a hustler – full of energy, making the connections, doing the talking and arranging meetings, until her efforts were rewarded when the tapes were eventually accepted by Essex Music. After this the duo were taken on by the Sherry Copeland talent agency, and signed with London's indie Cube label in 1972.

=== Whatever's for Us ===
Although Nestor and Armatrading were originally hoping to be songwriters, this was not what the production company behind Cube intended. The company was Tuesday Productions, owned by Gus Dudgeon, and Cube was their in-house label. Cube wanted to promote Armatrading as a performer—and also, it later turned out, to expel Nestor. The songs for the debut album were the choice of Dudgeon and Mike Stone, an American promoter who was jointly managing the duo at the time. The sidelining of Nestor seems to have been a decision made by both of them, with Stone saying at the time he "also wasn't keen on this duo idea".

The album was eventually titled Whatever's for Us and represented their first recorded work. It was produced by Dudgeon and recorded at Château d'Hérouville studios (then called Strawberry studios), in the Oise valley, near Paris, as well as two London studios - Trident Studios and Marquee Studios, and released in November 1972 by Cube Records (HIFLY 12). Tuesday Productions had wanted to call the album Joan Armatrading, but Nestor fought against that decision, saying it was "absolutely not right" to do so, given the work she had done over three years. The album consisted of fourteen songs, eleven of which were co-written by Nestor, and the duo had written over a hundred songs, with both Nestor and Armatrading taking turns to lead the singing and with Nestor also playing piano. The later publicity shots for the album were taken in and around Nestor's then flat, which was in St Luke's Road in Notting Hill; one of these was used on the back cover.

Tuesday Productions wanted to focus their efforts solely on Armatrading and decided they were going to market her as a solo artist, despite the collaboration with Nestor. From the many songs submitted for the album, only those featuring Armatrading singing were chosen, and Nestor later commented: "I got edged out that way." The album was released as a "Joan Armatrading" record, and the front cover credited it to her alone, factors that caused tension between the two writers, and these, together with the later promotional gigs organised by Sherry Copeland and Tuesday Productions/Cube that excluded Nestor entirely, contributed to the eventual breakup of the duo. These decisions were also responsible for causing a rift between Armatrading and Tuesday Productions/Cube Records, with Armatrading later devoting some time to extricating herself from the contract with them to sign with A&M Records. Some years later Armatrading sued Mike Stone, who subsequently returned to America, and although she did not use Dudgeon as a producer again, she later dedicated her 2003 album Lovers Speak to him and his wife Sheila after the pair were killed in a road accident in 2002.

The record label seemed determined at the time to erase Nestor from the picture, despite the contributions, lyrically, musically and entrepreneurial, she had made not just to the debut album but to the development of Armatrading as an artist. They took out a full-page advert in New Musical Express in late 1972, using the photograph from the rear of the album Whatever's for Us, and completely airbrushed out the shot of Pam Nestor, thus misleadingly portraying the album as solely the work of Armatrading while another promotional advert placed in the music paper Sounds in December 1976 on the reissue of the album, omitted any mention of Nestor's contribution. According to the Mayes biography, it was Nestor who eventually walked away from the partnership, feeling that she "had had enough", but Armatrading tried to keep the friendship and partnership together. The breakup and the way she had been treated by music industry people had a marked effect on Nestor: she was later described as being "edgy", "jittery" and "suspicious". The experience seems to have hurt her and damaged her self-confidence. She commented: "I got really hysterical about it" and "I was disposable as far as they were concerned".

The album drew critical acclaim but did not sell many copies – mainly because of poor promotion and distribution – selling "only about 2,000 copies", and despite all the praise it received in the music press, it was not a commercial success. However, it had been Nestor who, in the words of biographer Sean Mayes, "gave Joan the courage to do the impossible", and without her it is likely the album would not have been made.

=== Contribution ===
Nestor brought much more than just lyrics to the partnership with Joan Armatrading – she played piano and was the front woman of the duo at the time, making the arrangements, acting as the driving force for the partnership, hustling to get their songs accepted, looking out for Armatrading and protecting her, as music journalist Nick Kent says: "Armatrading felt protected against so much of the toil and hustle of London’s high-pressure pulse with Pam around, darting in and out making connections right, left and centre". Nestor was the catalyst that enabled Joan Armatrading's career to take off, as Kent said: "she’d do the rapping, the mixing while her quiet friend who spent so much time cloistered behind her piano or guitar, would hang back in the shadows, protected by the former’s feisty joie de vivre".

She also wrote music for some of the songs that the two compiled: “Ms Nestor providing lyrics to Joan’s melodies and vice versa”, and "they wrote songs together, swapping lyrics and music". An example is the song “Dry Land”, from the album Back to the Night and released as a single. It was co-written by Nestor, who provided not just the lyrics but the original draft of the music as well, according to the producer of the album, Pete Gage: "As soon as I heard Pam Nestor play – there's one number, it was the blueprint for Dry Land, there’s no doubt about it, Joan had actually learnt bits and pieces of Pam's piano playing". At the time, Armatrading was not confident in her own lyric writing and preferred Nestor's lyrics: "while Ms Armatrading, preferring the former’s lyrics to her own". It was suggested at the time in the music press that when Nestor co-wrote the duo's songs, it added a dimension to them. A contemporary review by Mark Plummer in Melody Maker comments that "it is when they are writing together that the songs work best".

Nestor felt that her role in pushing Armatrading towards a career in music had been undervalued. Her own background in fronting bands for years and her forceful personality had enabled Armatrading to learn some of the ins and outs of the music industry as well as about lyric writing, and had also improved her self-confidence. The Mayes biography records that it was Nestor who pushed Armatrading into performing her first promotional gigs – those that followed the Whatever's for Us album, when Armatrading had not wanted to do so. She later commented: "No-one seems to think she could have been influenced by me – basically I'm in her shadow and I don't like it at all."

=== Songs ===
The song "My Family" was covered by New York rock group and art/performance collective MEN in 2011. It was also used in a BBC Radio 4 drama in 2011 (see 'Most Recent section below).

“It Could Have Been Better" was used in the film Kill List in 2011. In February 2012, the song was also played as part of the Burberry Prorsum Women's Wear Autumn/Winter 2012 fashion show in London.

"Visionary Mountains" was covered by Manfred Mann's Earth Band on the album Nightingales & Bombers in 1975.

"Dry Land", a Nestor-Armatrading song from the album Back to the Night, was said to be the favourite song of the album's producer, Pete Gage, and was released as a single in 1976.

"Come When You Need Me", another song from the album Back to the Night, was also co-written by Nestor.

Several Nestor/Armatrading songs have appeared on compilations of Joan Armatrading's work, namely: "Dry Land", "Come When You Need Me", "My Family", "Alice", "It Could Have Been Better" and "Whatever's for Us".

== Later work ==
Following the break-up with Joan Armatrading, Nestor went to east London, and in 1973 was involved with the Basement Film Project's making of Tunde's Film – described as "a gritty neo-realist drama", directed by Maggie Pinhorn and Tunde Ikoli and starring Tunde Ikoli, who went on to enjoy later success as a playwright. She supplied the lyrics to the song "Dinah's Café" and sang it in the film's title sequence. She appeared on an edition of BBC's Open Door in August 1973 to promote the film, and was interviewed by Austin John Marshall of New Musical Express. Marshall described Pam Nestor as "radiant", and her voice as "raw and true, vibrant with scary latent power." Tunde's Film still crops up at festivals, and was shown in July 2012 as part of the East End Film Festival. It was also shown as part of the Cutting East Film Festival at the Genesis Cinema in Whitechapel in June 2013. The film is available at the Mediatheque archive at the BFI and is described as "a rarely seen portrait of racial tension in London's East End".

Cube released a second single by Armatrading and Nestor in late summer 1973, "Lonely Lady" and "Together in Words And Music". (Cube Records, 7" single, BUG-31). Both tracks were produced by Gus Dudgeon and were later added to the Whatever's For Us album as bonus tracks on the 2001 Metro remaster. Nestor is also thought to be co-writer of one or more of thirteen songs by the Neville Brothers, quoted as being written by: Timothy Garagan, Pam Nestor, Arthur Neville, Robert Quinn and Robert Richmond. ("Bad Scene", "Confraction", "Crazy Wandering Fool", "Don't Tell Lies", "Heartbreak Woman", "Hometown Girl", "I'm Left Alone", "Instrumental", "Love Needs A Keeper", "Out Of Your Life", "Piece Of Mind", "Shine Light Shine" and "Walk In The Sunshine".)

After 1973 Nestor got herself an agent and applied herself to improving her piano playing. She set about trying to rebuild a singing and performing career, eventually putting together a band that was known as the Pam Nestor Band, and reverted to her earlier attempts to launch a singing career, recording some material with Henry Spinetti, who had played on the Whatever's for Us album, and with Ken Cumberpatch producing. She also continued with some singing and performing engagements, for example, appearing with her band at the Nashville in Kensington, London, on 25 May 1978 supporting the Bowles Brothers, at the Acklam Hall, Notting Hill, on 27 November 1978 along with Liz Xtian and Clapperclaw, and at the Witcombe Lodge in Cheltenham on 25 August 1979, supported by Madness. In 1977, she was associated with the reggae band Merger, at the time fronted by the reggae artist Barry Ford ( also of Kilburn and the High Roads). Merger recorded a reggae album titled Exiles Ina Babylon on the Sun Star Label, which was released in 1977, and played the title track, "Exiles Ina Babylon" on an edition of The Old Grey Whistle Test in 1977, with Nestor appearing as a backing singer. She is credited on the album notes as providing backing vocals and percussion. Both Nestor and Ford left the band after this album. Exiles Ina Babylon was re-released as a CD in 2009 by Makasound, the independent French roots reggae label, with the album notes again crediting Pam Nestor.

Also in 1979, Nestor released a single titled "Hiding & Seeking (No More)" on the Tempus Records label (TEMD 21) with "Man on the Run" as its B-side. It was produced by Barry Ford and Dennis Bovell and was described by Colin Larkin as "an excellent one-off single". Nestor was credited as writing the lyrics and music for both of the songs. The single has acquired a following among devotees of the lovers rock subgenre of reggae. Little is known of Nestor from that date. Larkin notes that after the release of the single, she "seems not to have recorded since". She has kept a low profile and seems after 1979 to have left the music business entirely.

== Most recent ==
In 2000, Nestor was one of an organising team for a three-day conference at Birkbeck College, University of London, titled The Black Gaze. In 2009, she was awarded a PhD by Birkbeck College for a thesis titled Literature, madness and race: perceptions and experiences of madness in black literature.

In July 2011, Nestor made a guest appearance at Queen's College, an independent school in Harley Street, London. She was invited to take part in singing for a BBC Radio 4 drama about the suffragettes, broadcast in autumn 2012. She took part in singing "My Family", a song to which she wrote the lyrics, and which headlined the Whatever's for Us album.
