= Mudman =

Mudman or Mud-man may refer to:

- Golem, a folkloric being that is often made from mud

== Characters ==
- Mud-man (Dungeons & Dragons), a monster in the role-playing game Dungeons & Dragons
- Mudman, a character in the World Heroes series of games
- Mudman, a character in the My Hero Academia series
- Mudman, a character in the Atomic Puppet series of games
- Mudman, the titular character in a comic by Paul Grist
- Michigan Mudman, a folkloric character, said to roam the Northern Lower Peninsula of Michigan

== Other uses ==
- Kim Jones (artist) (born 1944), an American performance artist also known as Mudman
- Casio G-Shock Mudman, a watch

== See also ==
- Creation of man from clay
- Mudmen (disambiguation)
