= HM Prison Stocken =

Men's prison in Rutland, England

Coordinates: 52°44′50″N 0°34′49″W

HMP Stocken
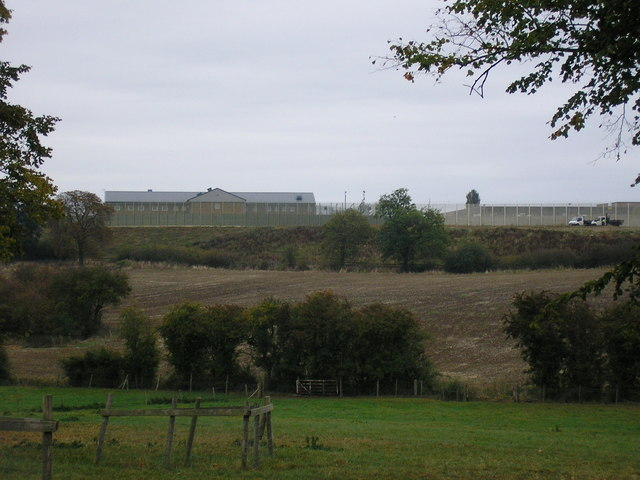
- Distant view of HMP Stocken
- Interactive map of HMP Stocken
- Location: Stretton, Rutland
- Security class: Adult Male/Category C
- Population: 1056 (June 2019)
- Opened: 1985
- Managed by: HM Prison Services
- Governor: Russ Truman
- Website: Stocken at justice.gov.uk

HM Prison Stocken is a Category C men's prison located in the parish of Stretton, in the county of Rutland, England. Stocken is operated by His Majesty's Prison Service.

== History ==
Built in 1985 as a Young Offenders' Institution, HMP Stocken opened as a closed training prison. It has since expanded with new wings added in 1990, 1997, 1998 and 2019.

In January 2003, an inspection report from Her Majesty's Chief Inspector of Prisons praised Stocken Prison, stating that it was an example for other jails to follow. Inspectors found "mutually respectful relationships between staff and prisoners" which created a "decent, safe and ordered environment." The prison also earned praise for its pre-release programme, which included housing advice and personal appointments for inmates. A new Modular Temporary Unit was opened at the prison two months later.

A new 'flat-pack' wing was added to the prison site in October 2007. The building is made from steel-framed modules that bolt together like a construction toy. Another wing was added in January 2008. In addition, new workshops have been constructed as part of the prisoner accommodation expansion.

In 2019, a further 206-bed unit was constructed, taking the prison's operating capacity to 1,056 prisoners.

In February 2021, an outbreak of COVID-19 in the prison caused Rutland to have the highest infection rate per 100,000 people in the country.

== The prison today ==
Stocken is a Category C prison for adult males. The prison's regime includes education (full/part-time), workshops, training courses, gardens, recycling and a maintenance department. Other features include a Listener Scheme, a drug-free wing, an Incentivised substance-free-living wing, a Resettlement Unit, and an Offender Management and Interventions Unit.

== Notable inmates ==
- Alex Belfield
- Winston Silcott
- Johnny Vaughan
