= American way (disambiguation) =

The American way is a term for the way of life in the United States.

American Way may also refer to:

- American Way (magazine), a magazine printed for American Airlines and American Eagle
- American Way (play), a 2004 play by Jeremy Gable
- Amway, multi-level marketing company
- The American System (economic plan), originally called "The American Way"
- The American Way (1919 film) directed by Frank Reicher
- The American Way (comics), 2006 comic book series
- The American Way (album), a 1990 album by Sacred Reich
- The American Way (play), a 1939 play by George S. Kaufman and Moss Hart
- The American Way (film), a 1986 American science fiction comedy film
- The American Way (novel), a novel by Paddy Kelly
- "American Way", a song by Nas from the album Street's Disciple
- "The American Way", song featured on Hank William Jr.'s 1980 album Habits Old and New

== See also ==
- People for the American Way, an advocacy organization in the US
