= The Movies (band) =

British pub rock music group

- Original lineup

Background information
- Origin: Cambridge, England, United Kingdom
- Genres: Pub rock, soft rock, latin
- Years active: 1974–1981
- Labels: A&M, CBS, RCA
- Members: Jon Cole; Julian Diggle; Greg Knowles; Jamie Lane; Colin Gibson
- Past members: Durban Laverde; Dag Small; Mick Parker; Dave Quinn; Mike Willis; Pete Townsend
- Website: themovies.org.uk

The Movies were a 6-piece British rock band prominent in the pub rock era of the mid-late 1970s. The band released five studio albums between 1975 and 1981. After their debut album, released by Firefly Records, they signed to GTO Records. They moved on again to RCA Records for their last two albums. They also recorded sessions for John Peel's BBC Radio 1 show in 1977, and had a live performance broadcast on the Radio 1 show In Concert the same year. The band made three appearances on the BBC television programme The Old Grey Whistle Test, in 1977, 1978, and 1980.

They served as a backing group for Joan Armatrading on her 1975 Back to the Night tour, while recording their first album with Joan's producer Pete Gage.

The band's music was compared with Ace, Steely Dan, and Little Feat. They were described in the Belfast Telegraph in 1978 as "one of Britain's most talented and sophisticated rock bands".

== Musicians ==
- Jon Cole – lead vocals, guitar, slide guitar
- Julian Diggle – percussion, harmonica, vocals
- Greg Knowles – lead guitar, backing vocals
- Jamie Lane – drums, backing vocals
- Durban Laverde – bass (1974–1975)
- Dag Small – keyboards (1974–1976)
- Mick Parker – keyboards (1976–1981)
- Dave Quinn – bass (1975–1978)
- Colin Gibson – bass (1978–1981)

== Discography ==
Albums

- The Movies (1975), Firefly/A&M
- Double "A" (1977), GTO
- Bullets Through the Barrier (1978), GTO/Epic
- India (1980), RCA
- Motor Motor Motor (1981), RCA

Singles

- "Fancy Man" (1975)
- "Big Boys Band" (1977)
- "Have Another Body"
- "Last Train"
- "No Class"
- "Love Is a Sacrifice"
- "Hard Heart" (American release)
- "Clockwise Into the Sun"
