= John Senescall =

English cricketer

Personal information
- Full name: John Senescall
- Born: 31 May 1853; Greetham, Rutland, England
- Died: 4 November 1937 (aged 84); Melton, Yorkshire, England
- Batting: Right-handed
- Bowling: Right-arm fast

Domestic team information
- Years: Team
- 1882–1883: Sussex

Career statistics
Competition	First-class
Matches	6
Runs scored	26
Batting average	2.88
100s/50s	0/0
Top score	8
Balls bowled	611
Wickets	18
Bowling average	15.22
5 wickets in innings	1
10 wickets in match	0
Best bowling	6/23
Catches/stumpings	1/–
- Source: Cricinfo, 12 March 2012

John Senescall (31 May 1853 – 4 November 1937) was an English cricketer. Senescall was a right-handed batsman who bowled right-arm fast. He was born at Greetham, Rutland.

Senescall made his first-class debut for Sussex against Yorkshire in 1882. He made five further first-class appearances for the county, the last of which came against Hampshire in 1883. In his six first-class matches, he took 18 wickets at an average of 15.22, with best figures of 6/23. These figures represented his only five-wicket haul and came against Hampshire in 1882. With the bat, he scored 26 runs at a batting average of 2.88, with a high score of 8.

He died at Melton, Yorkshire, on 4 November 1937.
