= Moviewatch =

- Starring: Johnny Vaughan
- Country of origin: United Kingdom
- Original language: English

Production
- Running time: 30mins

Original release
- Network: Channel 4
- Release: 17 January 1993 – 2 March 1998

Moviewatch is a film review television programme broadcast on Channel 4 in the United Kingdom. It ran for six seasons from 17 January 1993 to 2 March 1998.

The programme was hosted in the studio by Johnny Vaughan together with a female reporter - Laurie Pike in the first season, Sally Gray in series 2-3 and Alex McLeod in series 4-6 - who would generally be based in LA.

Moviewatch was produced by Chapter One productions and filmed at the Channel 4's Horseferry Road headquarters in London. Each week four members of the public would watch four forthcoming films. They would then discuss each film in turn, along with Johnny. There would also be interviews with actors and directors as well as news about upcoming films.

The guest reviewers would mark each film out of ten. The film with the highest rating at the end of the show was declared the Moviewatch Film of the Week.

During the show's run, very few films achieved a perfect 10/10 from all four reviewers - most notably Spike Lee's Malcolm X, and in the final episode of the last season, Matt Damon and Ben Affleck's Good Will Hunting, for which they went on to win the Oscar for Best Original Screenplay at the 70th Academy Awards.
