= Vinegar Joe =

Vinegar Joe may mean:

- Joseph Stilwell (1883–1946), United States Army general nicknamed Vinegar Joe
- Vinegar Joe (band), an English Blues rock band
