= Pete Gage (guitarist) =

English musician (born 1947)

- Born: 31 August 1947 (age 78); Lewisham, South East London
- Instruments: Guitarist; composer; arranger; record producer
- Years active: 1960s–present

Peter Gage (born 31 August 1947) is an English rock guitarist, pianist, composer and record producer, best known for his work with Geno Washington & the Ram Jam Band and Vinegar Joe.

== Geno Washington and the Ram Jam Band ==
In 1964 Gage formed his Ram Jam Band with school friend Geoff Pullum and Pullum's musician colleagues from working Frankfurt clubs, Herb Prestige (drums) and John Roberts (Bass). Gage's name for the band was inspired by the Ram Jam Inn, a solitary pub on the A1 road in Rutland, UK which he often passed driving North on tour with The Zephyrs. Gage's aspiration was for the band to emulate the US soul shows such as Solomon Burke, James Brown, Johnny Otis & Motown all of which were practically unknown in the UK at that time. The Zephyrs had played at the East Anglian USAF Bases and Gage had met Geno Washington who regularly jumped up on stage and jammed with the visiting bands but Geno had another 14 months before being demobbed.

The formation of the Ram Jam Band consolidated after many auditions and adding saxophonists Lionel Kingham and Stephen 'Buddy' Beadle. Finding an effective singer proved harder despite trying several singers from the West Indian community; Kenny Bernard, Kenrick Des Etages and John Holder came and went. The longest collaboration was with singer Errol Dixon (Jamaican Chart single 'Got to have some') but although they performed at the prestigious 'Flamingo' jazz/soul club and Ska/BlueBeat heartland the 'Roaring 20's', Gage started to believe that the right singer for the band would have to be from an Afro-American background. He met with Geno Washington and offered him the money (on loan from his mother) to demob, return to the US and return to front the Ram Jam Band in the UK. Through a very nervous 2 months in 1965, the Ram Jams waited for Geno to return. After two weeks rehearsal, they auditioned for the Gunnell brothers, managers of the Flamingo Club and were immediately booked as a regular attraction.

They became known for their energetic live performances and released two live albums Hand Clappin, Foot Stompin, Funky-Butt ... Live! (1966) and Hipster Flipsters Finger Poppin' Daddies, both of which were major UK chart successes, although their singles "Water", "Hi Hi Hazel", "Que Sera Sera" and "Michael (the Lover)" only sold moderately.

The band toured extensively and built up a strong fanbase, particularly among the "mods". Their later albums Sifters, Shifters, Finger Clicking Mamas (1968) and Shake a Tail Feather Baby (both 1968) sold less well, and The Ram Jam Band broke up in late 1969 a few months after the death of Gage's wife Pauline, in a car crash returning from the Twisted Wheel in Manchester.

== Vinegar Joe ==
Gage was approached by Elkie Brooks (whom he later married) to use the Ram Jam Band as her backing band. Gage declined but they became an item while Brooks rehearsed with Tim Hinkley's Jody Grind, to develop a more bluesy style than her previous pop genre. Gage produced several singles and LPs for the Major Minor label but then was inspired to form Dada, a 12-piece jazz fusion band, including Brooks. Dada soon had a deal with Atlantic Records, and released an album and toured the US. Gage meanwhile had met Robert Palmer while Palmer was still in Art College. Ahmed Ertegun of Atlantic wanted Dada to become more a typical rock act and dispense with their brass section. Gage persuaded Palmer to move to London, eventually to join Dada, and then in an agreement with Atlantic and Island records switch to the new smaller line up as Vinegar Joe. As well as playing guitar, piano and arranging, Gage wrote most of Vinegar Joe's songs, and was active in their production, producing or co-producing all three of their albums.

After the break up of Vinegar Joe, Gage continued writing, arranging and producing songs for Brooks, until their divorce. He concentrated on producing, working with a wide range of successful musicians from mainstream acts such as Joan Armatrading. Some of Gage's record production work, particularly with rockabilly bands such as Restless, FrenZy, King Kurt and The Meteors, was under the pseudonym Micky Mutant.

== Confusion ==
A different British musician named Pete Gage, was vocalist and harmonica player for Jet Harris (1967 "My Lady" single), and for Dr. Feelgood from 1995 to 1999. He also fronted his own band releasing albums featuring artists such as Gypie Mayo. Numerous discographies e.g. Allmusic and CD Universe combine those artists' output in one list.

== Discography ==
NB this includes Gage's appearances as a musician and his role as a producer.

With Geno Washington

(performer)

- Hand Clappin, Foot Stompin, Funky-Butt ... Live! (1966)
- Hipster Flipsters Finger Poppin' Daddies
- Sifters, Shifters, Finger Clicking Mamas (1968)
- Shake a Tail Feather Baby (1968)

With Dada

- Dada (album, 1970) (producer and performer)

With Vinegar Joe

(producer and performer)

- Vinegar Joe 1972
- Rock 'n' Roll Gypsies 1972
- Six Star General 1973
- Six Star Gypsies 1993

With Vinegar Joe members

- Lancashire Hustler – Keef Hartley 1973
- Shooting Star – Elkie Brooks 1978

With Joan Armatrading

- Back to the Night 1975 (producer, performer)

With Restless

- After Midnight (1986)
- Rock 'n' Roll Beginners 2003
- #7 2007
- Movin' On 2009
- Beat My Drum

With FrenZy

- Clockwork Toy album 1985
- I See Red single 1986

With Demented Are Go

- In Sickness and in Health 1986
- Orgasmic Nightmare 2003

With other artists

- The Movies - The Movies 1975 (producer)
- Mr. Mick – Stackridge 1976
- Casino – 1976
- Mean Time – The Barracudas 1983 (producer and performer)
- "She's Lost You" – Joan Jett and the Blackhearts (1987) (writer)
- Wheelin' 'N' Dealin'/Riding High – Sassafras 2006
- Loveblows and Lovecries: A Confession – No-Man 1993
- Kats Karavan: The History Of the John Peel Show – Various Artists 2009 (performer?)
- Rock 'N' Roll Man – Mal Gray and the Wild Angels (compilation, 2007)
- Wreckin' Crew The Meteors –
- Stomping at the Klub Foot (Vol. 1 and 2)
- Curse of the Coffin – Nekromantix 1991
- Funtime – The Tall Boys 1998
- Hypnosis – Torment 2002
- Murder in the Graveyard – Screaming Lord Sutch 2003
- No Peace for the Wicked – Fractured 2007
- Four to the Bar – The Sureshots 2007
- Clarendon Ballroom – Batmobile 2008
- Glad Rags and Body Bags – Zombie Ghost Train
