= Geno Washington & the Ram Jam Band =

UK musical group

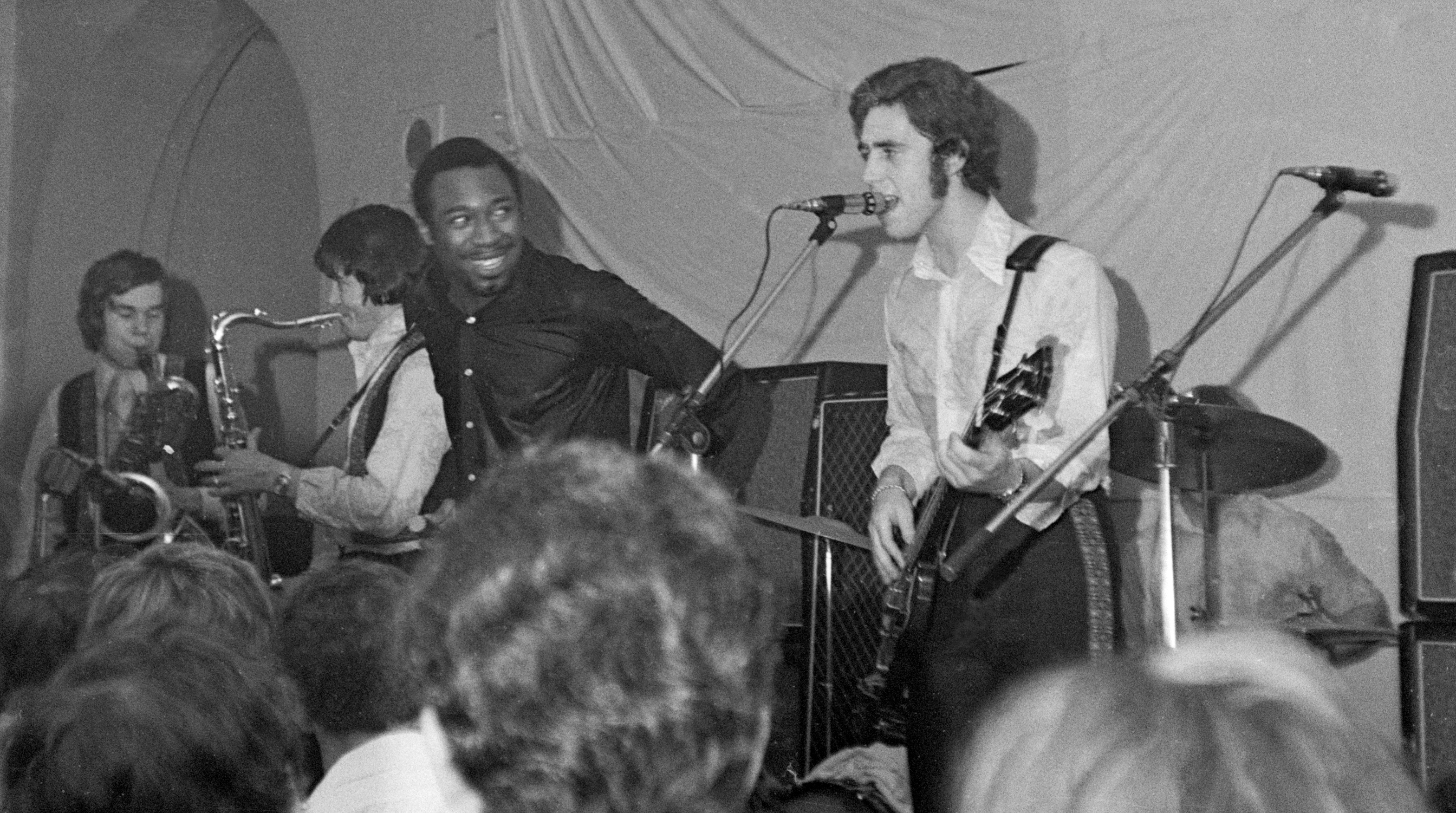
- Geno Washington & The Ram Jam Band; Performing at the Students Union, UCL, in 1968

Background information
- Origin: London, England
- Genre: Soul
- Years active: 1965–1968, 2005–present
- Labels: Piccadilly, Pye, Castle, Marble Arch
- Past members: 1967–1968; Geno Washington; Pete Gage; Lionel Kingham; Buddy Beadle; Geoff Pullum (aka Jeff Wright); John Roberts; Herb Prestidge
- Website: Geno Washington Website

Geno Washington & the Ram Jam Band are an England-based soul band.

== Background ==
The Ram Jam Band were formed around 1964 by Pete Gage and Geoff Pullum. Before taking on Geno Washington, whom Gage knew from performing at the RAF Bentwaters US Air Force base, they had a Jamaican Blue Beat singer by the name of Errol Dixon front the band as they embarked on the London club circuit. Gage approached Washington to finance his demobbing to the US and to return to front the band as it seemed essential to have an American to perform US soul rather than the West Indian alternatives in London at that time.

Geno Washington was a US airman stationed in East Anglia who became well known for his impromptu performances in London nightclubs. In 1965, guitarist Pete Gage needed a singer to front his new band and replace the previous singer, Errol Dixon, and asked Washington to join. When Washington was discharged from the US Air Force, he became the band's frontman.

== Career ==
Their first single featuring Geno, "Shake, Shake, Senora" / "Akinla", released on Columbia, was not a commercial success. At some stage the band had recorded a demo of the Barbara Lynn hit "You'll Lose a Good Thing".

They released two live albums. Hand Clappin, Foot Stompin, Funky-Butt ... Live! was released in 1966, reached no.5 on the UK Albums Chart, and remained in the charts for 38 weeks. It was followed up by Hipster Flipsters Finger Poppin' Daddies in 1967, which reached no.8 on the chart. They also had some moderate hit singles released by the Pye label: "Water", "Hi Hi Hazel", "Que Sera Sera" and "Michael (the Lover)".

They built a strong following with the crowds and due to their touring and energetic performances. Like their Pye label mates and rivals, Jimmy James and the Vagabonds, they became popular with the mod scene.

The band's name came from the Ram Jam Inn, an old coaching inn on the A1 (Great North Road) at Stretton, near Oakham, Rutland.

The new single "Hi Hi Hazel" was reviewed in the 16 July, 1966 issue of Disc and Music Echo in the Penny Picks the Pops section. Reviewer Penny noted that the Troggs were going to record the song as a single. Recalling that the band had a previous hit, she predicted the same for this single.

At some stage, the group released an EP called Hi. It debuted at No. 9 on the Record Mirror Top E.P.'s chart for the week of 5 August 1967. The single "She Shot a Hole in My Soul" was also bubbling under the Record Mirror Britian's Top 50 chart.

It was reported by Record World in the 17 August, 1968 issue that there were very few English soul bands. But Jimmy James' band and Washington's bands were the two biggest soul bands and were among the ten highest paid bands of any kind there.

The band broke up in the autumn of 1969 and the band members went their own ways while Geno Washington continued as a solo artist before returning to the United States. Keyboard player Geoffrey K. Pullum became an academic linguist, and is today a professor emeritus at the University of Edinburgh. He was also a linguistics blogger at the Language Log and Lingua Franca websites.

The album Sifter Shifters & Finger Clickin' Mamas was listed as one of the best-selling albums from Pye by Cash Box in the magazine's July 5, 1969 issue.

Washington temporarily reformed the band between February and June 1971 with new band members Dave Watts (organ), Mo Foster (bass), Mike Jopp (guitar) and Grant Serpell (drums).

Since 2005, Geno Washington and The Ram Jam Band have been constantly playing shows. The line-up of the band is in early 2024: Greg Lester (Guitar and Backing Vocals); Nick Blake (Brass), Geoff Hemsley (Drums); Steve Bingham (Bass and Backing Vocals) and Geno Washington (Lead Vocals).

== Former members ==
- Geno Washington, lead vocals
- Pete Gage, guitar
- Lionel Kingham, saxophone
- Buddy Beadle, saxophone
- Geoff Pullum aka Jeff Wright, organ
- John Roberts, bass
- Pete Carney, bass
- Herb Prestidge, drums
- Clive Burrows, saxophone
- Paul Turner, bass guitar
- Keith O'Connell, Hammond Organ (1968 - 1969)

Early Les Blues-line-up

- Tony Coe, double bass
- later replaced by John Game, bass guitar
- Colin Gilbert, piano/keyboards
- Morton Lewis, guitar
- Gerry Gillings, drums

== Discography ==
=== Albums ===
- Hand Clappin' Foot Stompin' Funky-Butt ... Live! – Piccadilly NPL 38026 – 1966 UK 5
- Shake A Tail Feather – Piccadilly NPL.38029 – 1967
- Hipsters, Flipsters, Finger-Poppin' Daddies – Piccadilly NPL.38032 – 1967 UK 8
- Running Wild – Pye NSPL.18219 – 1968
- Sifters, Shifters, Finger Clicking Mamas – Marble Arch MAL 816 (Mono) / MALS 816 (Stereo) – 1968
- Uptight – Marble Arch MALS 1162 – 1969
- Golden Hour of Geno Washington & The Ram Jam Band – Golden Hour GSH 594 – 1975
- Hand Clappin' Foot Stompin' Funky-Butt ... Live! (Reissue) – PYE NSPL 18618 – 1980

=== CDs ===
- Hip Shakin' Soul Breakin' Earthquakin' Live – PYE PYC 4018 – 1988
- Hand Clappin Foot Stompin' Funky Butt Live – Repertoire REP 4189-WZ – 1991
- Hipsters, Flipsters, Finger-Poppin' Daddies! – Repertoire REP 4190-WZ – 1991
- Geno Washington VS. Jimmy James ... No Holds Barred Sequel NEX CD 169
- Hand Clappin' Foot Stompin' Funky-Butt ... Live! & Hipsters Flipsters, Finger Poppin' Daddies! – C5 CD 581 – 1995
- Geno – Spectrum 5507692
- My Bombers, Mey Dexy's, My Highs (The Sixties Studio Sessions) – Sequel MEMCD 973 – 1998
- Geno! Geno! Geno! ... Live in the 60's – Sequel NXTCD 295 – 1998
- Foot Stompin' Soul – Castle 1304 – 2006
- Geno Washington and The Ram Jam Band Live at The Half Moon Putney – PQFMusic/Pete Quaife Foundation – 2014

=== EPs ===
- Hi Piccadilly NEP.34054 – 1966
- Different Strokes Pye 7N.17425 – 1967
- Small Package of Hipsters Pye NEP.24302 -1968
- Que Sera Sera Flashback FBEP.103 – 1980
- Holding On with Both Hands – Acid Jazz – 2012

=== Singles ===
- "Shake, Shake, Senora" / "Akinla", Columbia 7621, 1965 (Ram Jam Band only)
- "Water" / "Understanding", Piccadilly 7N 35312, UK No. 39, May 1966
- "Hi Hi Hazel" / "Beach Bash", Piccadilly 7N 35329, UK No. 45, July 1966
- "Que Sera Sera" / "All I Need", Piccadilly 7N 35346, UK No. 43, October 1966
- "Michael (the Lover)" / "Gotta Hold on to My Love", Piccadilly 7N 35359, UK No. 39, December 1966
- "Always" / "If You Knew" / "She Shot a Hole in My Soul" / "I've Been Hurt by Love", Piccadilly 7N 35392, 1967
- "Tell It Like It Is"/"Girl I Want To Marry You", Piccadilly 7N 35403, 1967
- "Different Strokes"/"You Got Me Hummin'", Pye 7N 17425, 1967
- "I Can't Quit Her"/"Put Out The Fire Baby", Pye 7N 17570, 1968
- "I Can't Let You Go"/"Bring It To Me Baby", Pye 7N 17649, 1968
- "My Little Chickadee"/"Seven Eleven", Pye 7N 17745, 1969
