= The American Way (novel) =

2009 book by Paddy Kelly

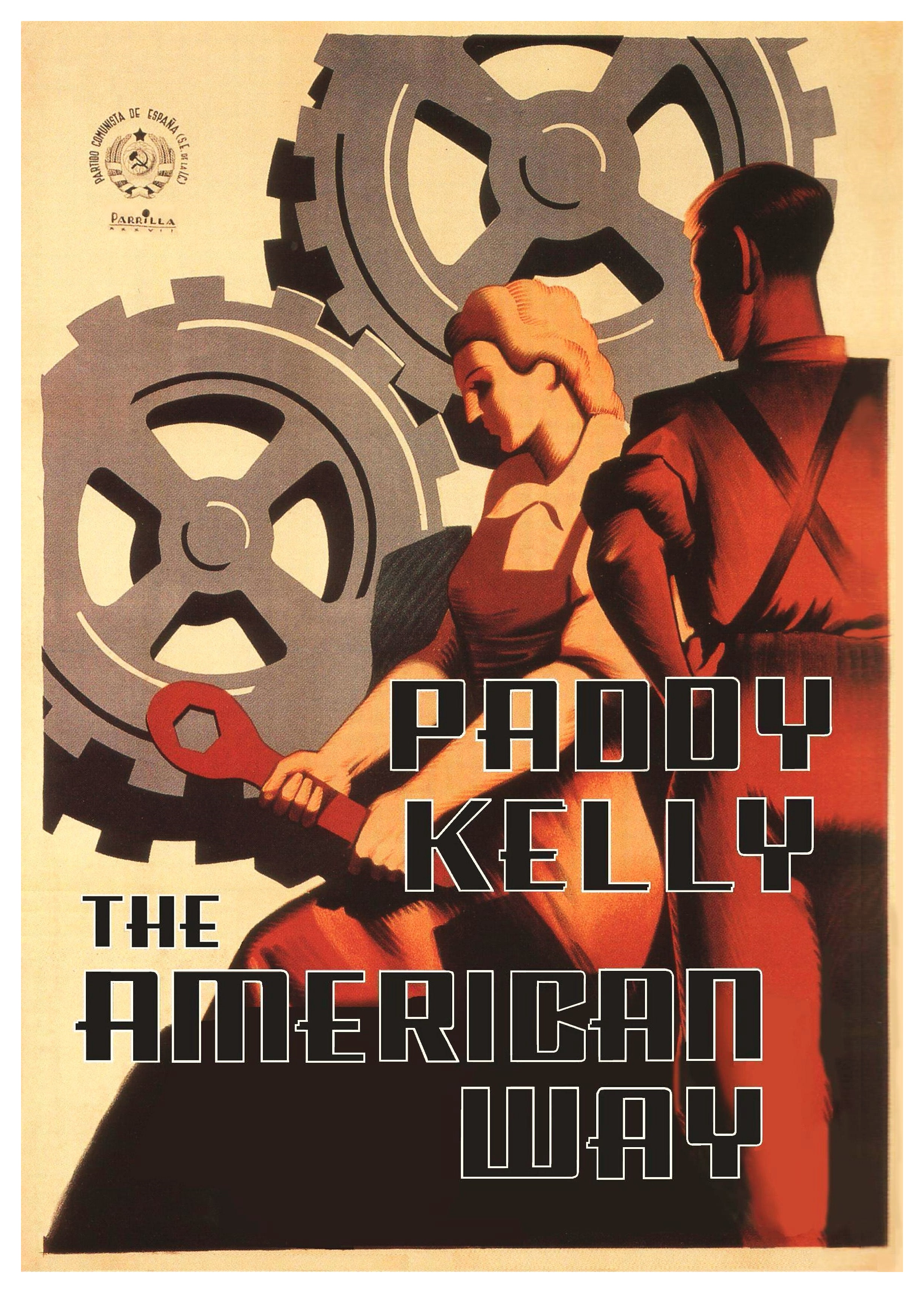
- Author: Paddy Kelly
- Genre: Historical fiction
- Published: January 2009 Fiction4All
- Media type: Paperback
- Pages: 308 (PB)
- ISBN: 978-1-904086-14-7
- Preceded by: Operation Underworld
- Followed by: The Wolves of Calabria

The American Way is the second in a four novel series entitled Building of Empire, Crime and Politics; the Cornerstone of America by author Paddy Kelly. The American Way relates the events leading up to and through the Great Woolen Strike of 1912 in Lawrence, Massachusetts when approximately 40,000 immigrants from nearly every country in Europe, sharing 30 religions and 127 ethnic back grounds organized a seven-week strike against the richest man in the world. This despite the fact that only ten percent of them spoke English. Released in 2011 the title of this historical fiction is originally taken from the opening lines of the 1950s Superman television program Adventures of Superman (1952–1958) ". . . truth, justice and the American way!" However the catch phrase is meant as an entendre in that the American Way, usually perceived as the right and good way, is also in reality a two edged sword of unprecedented levels of corruption found at all levels of industry and government at the time the story is set.

== Plot ==
The American Way chronicles the story of one of the largest industrial actions of the early 20th Century utilizing the Triangle Factory Fire tragedy, as an inciting incident. The fire, the worst workplace disaster in the history of New York City until September 11. As the fire rages and workers are dying by the scores three members of the labor union, the Industrial Workers of the World, or I.W.W., Joe Ettor, Arturo Giovannitti and Elizabeth Gurley Flynn witness the aftermath and vow to devote their efforts to the unskilled foreign labor being widely exploited throughout the country. At about the same time, with no knowledge of the growing instability of the U.S. labor situation, Michael Casaburi, a former Sicilian policeman who has lost his wife in a natural catastrophe, contemplates travel to the U.S. to seek work and a new life. Upon seeing a propaganda poster distributed by The American Woolen Company and boasting the fantastic life style available to him by working for the A.W.C., Michael decides to spend the last remnants of his savings in the trans-Atlantic voyage to New York to rebuild his life. Through a distant acquaintance of the family, after reaching Lawrence, Massachusetts, Michael secures a job and sends to Sicily for his sixteen-year-old daughter, Anna. Michael only becomes aware of the possibility of a strike after he has sent for Anna and has no idea how deep the rift between the tens of thousands of abused factory workers and the mill owners actually is. Run by William Wood and owned by J.P. Morgan one of the three richest men in the world, the battle has become one of denial by the bosses and constant struggle by the workers. Standing against the mass of workers is a racially motivated police force, the State Militia, Samuel Gompers and the American Federation of Labor, the U. S. Secretary of Labor and a hostile U.S. president, William Howard Taft. Due to the fact that the mass of workers is divided along ethnic lines and less than ten per cent of them speak English, Wood and the other mill owners believe them to be "un-organizeable". However unbeknownst to Wood the I.W.W. has sent a representative to help organize the workers. When the situation escalates Mayor Scanlon, siding with the mill owners, advises Wood contact Governor Foss. Foss, having been put in power largely by Wood's and other industrialist's money, agrees to help and calls out the militia who illegally declare a state of martial law. Strongly suspecting the impending violence based on the police and militia's past attitudes and actions the women mill workers gather the children and with help from New York press find temporary homes for the children in New York City until the strike is over. An incident at the train station leads to worldwide sympathy for the strikers who ultimately triumph.

== Characters ==
=== Giuseppe 'Joe' Ettor ===
is a prominent member of the Industrial Workers of the World, and the man who first helps in organizing the strike.

=== Arturo Giovannitti ===
is a long time member of the I.W.W., poet and writer.

=== Angelo Rocco ===
is one of the handful of I.W.W. members in Lawrence, who initially cables New York for help.

=== Elizabeth Gurley Flynn ===
is a lifetime activist, prominent I.W.W. member and who is rising to prominence due to her fiery rhetoric and passionate speeches.

=== William Haywood ===
is an unyielding patriarch and veteran of the Haymarket Bombing Disaster. Haywood is the head of the Industrial Workers of the World labor union who are in direct conflict with the American Federation of Labor both of whom are vying to control all labor in America.

=== Acting Police Chief Sullivan ===
is the senior police official in the City of Lawrence who greatly resents the 'foreign rabble' now flocking to the shores of the U.S.

=== John Scanlon ===
is the elected Mayor of the City of Lawrence.

=== William Wood ===
is the CEO of the American Woollen Company headquartered in Boston but built and operating out of the mill complex in the Lawrence area.

=== Samuel Gompers ===
is the Head of American Federation of Labor, or the AFL, and harbors great disdain for the unskilled, foreign workers believing them to be easily replaceable cogs in a wheel due to their numbers. Additionally he sees the I.W.W. as a direct threat to the A.F.L. as well as the stability of the entire country.

=== John Pierpont Morgan ===
is one of the top three richest men in the world. Through controlling interests, along with major rail and shipping investments, he owns the Lawrence mills.

=== Eugene Foss ===
is the governor of the state of Massachusetts who is line to win the presidential candidacy.

=== Colonel Sweeter ===
is the right wing, ultra conservative commander of the militia charged with restoring order to Lawrence and the surrounding area.

=== William Howard Taft ===
is president of the United States who outwardly advocates labor reform but behind closed doors works closely with the industrialists to advance their interests.

=== Michael Casaburi ===
a fictional character, is representative of the workers. A former policeman from the small town of Ulmi in Sicily, he has lost his position due to the poverty of the region and has been forced to find work on the archaeological dig at Pompeii in the north for little pay. Casaburi acts as the primary protagonist leading the reader through the story.

=== Alfonso "Affo" Affanoso ===
is a man from Palermo who knew several families familiar to Michael and who helps Casaburi learn the ropes at the mills.

=== Anna Casaburi ===
is Michael's sixteen-year-old daughter.

== Locations ==
=== Cooper Union Square ===
Lower Manhattan, New York City is the historic gathering place during the early 20th Century for unionists and other activists.

=== Ulmi ===
a small town in the west of Sicily.

=== The Triangle Waistcoat Factory Building ===
located at 23-29 Washington Place in Lower Manhattan. Site of the infamous disaster in 1911.

=== Lawrence, Massachusetts ===
The city where the sprawling mill complex, police station, rail station, Mayor's office and militia billeting are located is the primary setting for the story.

=== Boston, Massachusetts ===
headquarters for the American Woolen Company leaders of the so-called "woolen trust"

=== The White House, Washington D.C. ===
is the private residence of William Howard Taft well known for his girth Taft's standard breakfast was 12 eggs, a pound of bacon, a loaf of bread and a quart or more of milk, coffee or juice. He completely ignores his poor health and in contrast to the meager food conditions of the mill workers, freely engages in a gluttonous life style. Various locations in Washington D.C. to include the White House are included.

== Major Concepts ==
=== Exploitation of immigrant labor & The struggle against impossible odds ===
The exploitation of immigrant labor and the struggle against seemingly impossible odds are complimentary as themes in the story. Focused on the drama of people caught up in national events larger than themselves and rising to the occasion, the story proposes that the immigrant labor of the period is largely responsible for the success of the industrialization and therefore the military might of the country.

=== Crime and Politics in America ===
The American Way deals primarily with the relationship between crime and politics in the United States. The narrative propagates that by 1912 the conditions created by the unscrupulous industrialists and businessmen of the period created an atmosphere which directly gave rise to people like Charlie "Lucky Luciano", Meyer Lansky and Albert Anastasia and taught them, as immigrants, how to fight back against people like William Wood, president of the American Woolen Trust, J. Edgar Hoover and U. S. President William Howard Taft. It is at this point in American history that crime had truly become the "left hand of politics" in America. Men like the founders of Italian and Jewish organized crime in America saw and understood that 'working within the system' was a pointless exercise and therefore not a viable option to realize the American Dream. The Irish organized crime syndicates, by contrast, are shown to have been well established by the turn of the century. Kelly revisits the primary characters and the Mafia/U.S. government relations two years after the invasion of Sicily in the novel "The Wolves of Calabria". Author Paddy Kelly spent time in New York City to include some secondary school and university on an athletic scholarship. His mother was a seamstress who related the story of the Triangle Factory Fire to him.

== Books ==
- The Founding Convention of the IWW — Proceedings. New York: Merit Publishers. 1969. p. 616. Library of Congress Catalog Number 70-85538.
- Buhle, Paul (ed.). Wobblies: A Graphic History of the Industrial Workers of the World. Nicole Schulman. Verso. ISBN 1-84467-525-4.
- Chester, Eric Thomas (2014). The Wobblies in Their Heyday: The Rise and Destruction of the Industrial Workers of the World during the World War I Era. Praeger Publishers. ISBN 144083301X.
- Dubofsky, Melvyn. We Shall Be All: A History of the Industrial Workers of the World. [1969] First paperbound edition. New York: Quadrangle/New York Times Books, 1973.
- Duda, John, ed. (2009). Wanted! Men to Fill the Jails of Spokane: Fighting for Free Speech with the Hobo Agitators of the Industrial Workers of the World. Chicago: Charles H. Kerr. ISBN 978-0-88286-270-5.
- Kornbluh, Joyce L., ed. (1988) [1964]. Rebel Voices: An IWW Anthology (Charles H. Kerr with new introduction and essays ed.). Ann Arbor: University of Michigan Press. 419, illustrated. ISBN 0-88286-237-5.
- Foner, Philip S. (1947). History of the American Labor Movement in the United States:
  - Vol. 3: The Policies and Practices of the American Federation of Labor, 1900–1909. New York: International Publishers, 1964.
  - Vol. 4: Industrial Workers of the World. New York: International Publishers, 1965.
  - Vol. 5: The AFL in the Progressive Era, 1910–1915. New York: International Publishers, 1980.
  - Vol. 6: On the Eve of America's Entrance into World War I, 1915–1916. New York: International Publishers, 1982.
- McClelland, John, Jr. (1987). Wobbly War: The Centralia Story. Washington State Historical Society.
- Moran, William (2002). Belles of New England: The Women of the Textile Mills and the Families Whose Wealth They Wove. St. Martin's Press. p. 320.
- Rosen, Ellen Doree (2004). A Wobbly Life: IWW Organizer E. F. Doree. Introduction by Melvyn Dubofsky. Detroit, Michigan: Wayne State University Press. p. 256. ISBN 0-8143-3203-X.
- St. John, Vincent (1917). The I. W. W.: Its History, Structure & Methods. I. W. W. Publishing Bureau.
- Thompson, Fred (1955). The I. W. W.: Its First Fifty Years. Chicago: IWW.
- Thornton, Steve (2013). A Shoeleather History of the Wobblies: Stories of the Industrial Workers of the World (IWW) in Connecticut. The Shoeleather History Project. p. 150. ISBN 978-0989822404.
- Tyler, Robert (1967). Rebels of the Woods: The I. W. W. in the Pacific Northwest. Eugene, OR: University of Oregon Press.

== General references ==
- Industrial Workers of the World Collection. Collection spans 1903–1996 at the Walter P. Reuther Library of Labor and Urban Affairs.
- Documents, Essays and Analysis for a History of the Industrial Workers of the World. Online archive at the Marxists Internet Archive. Retrieved April 16, 2005.
- Industrial Workers of the World Records, 1906–1944, undated. Approximately .05 cubic feet of textual materials, 1 microfilm cassette (negative). At the Labor Archives of Washington State, University of Washington Libraries Special Collections.
