= Geno Washington =

American R&B singer (born 1943)

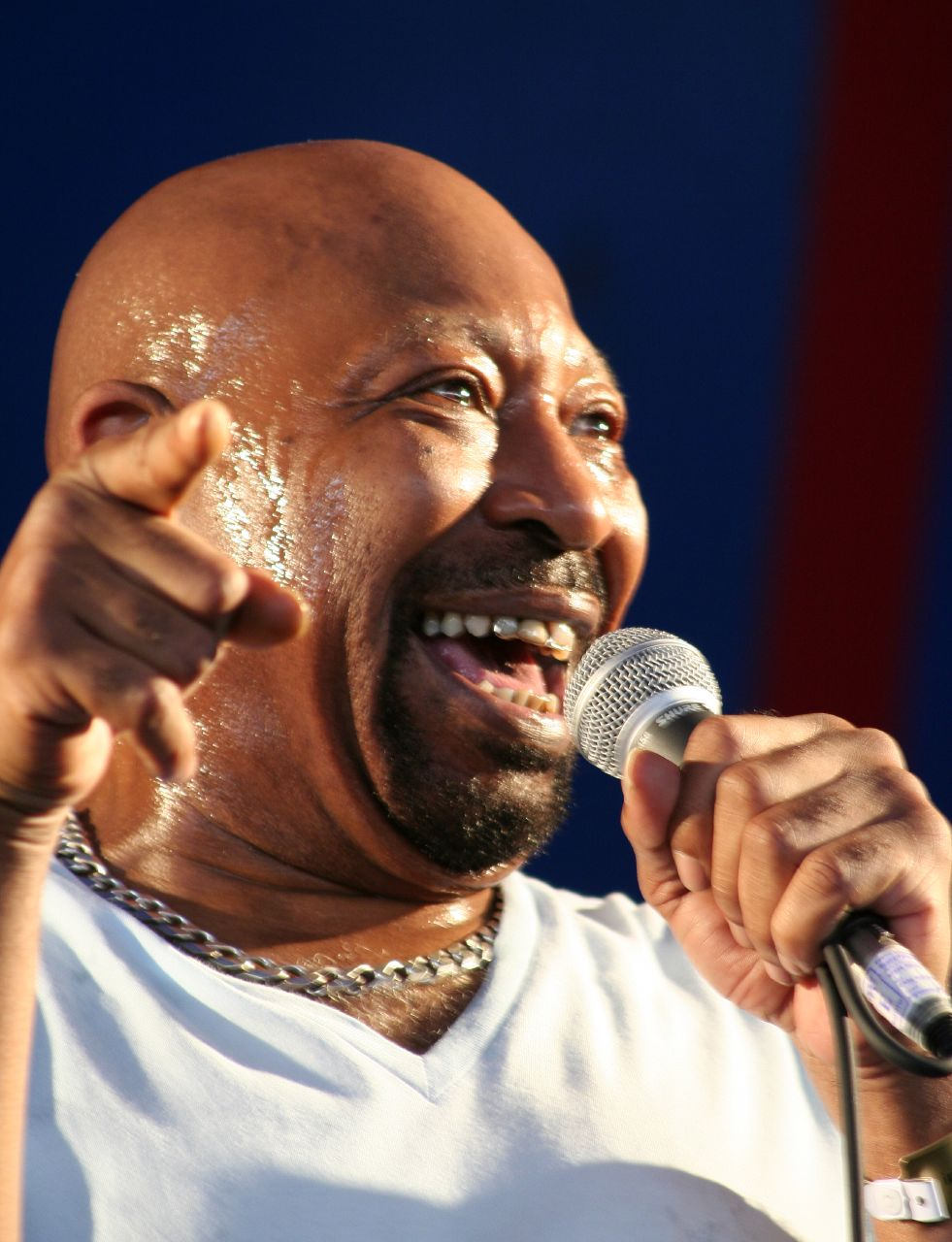
- Pictured in 2007

Background information
- Born: William Francis Washington; December 21, 1943 (age 82)
- Origin: Evansville, Indiana, United States
- Genres: Soul, R&B, pop, blues
- Occupation: Musician
- Instrument: Vocals
- Years active: 1966–present
- Labels: Piccadilly, Marble Arch, Pye, DJM
- Formerly of: Geno Washington & the Ram Jam Band
- Website: www.genowashington.blogspot.com

Geno Washington (born William Francis Washington; December 21, 1943, in Evansville, Indiana) is an American R&B singer who released five albums with the Ram Jam Band between 1966 and 1969, and eight solo albums beginning in 1976.

== Background ==
Washington was stationed in England with the United States Air Force during the early 1960s. While stationed in East Anglia, Washington became known as a frequent stand-in at gigs around London. When guitarist Pete Gage saw him at a nightclub in 1965, he asked Washington to join his new group, that was to become Geno Washington & the Ram Jam Band. Gage later formed Vinegar Joe with Elkie Brooks and Robert Palmer. The band's name came from the Ram Jam Inn, an old coaching inn on the A1 (Great North Road) at Stretton, near Oakham, Rutland.

The group had two of the biggest selling UK albums of the 1960s, both of which were live albums. Their most commercially successful album, Hand Clappin, Foot Stompin, Funky-Butt ... Live!, was in the UK Albums Chart for 38 weeks in 1966 and 1967, peaking at number 5 on the chart. The other album was Hipster Flipsters Finger Poppin' Daddies, which reached number 8 on the UK album chart. The group had a number of moderate UK Singles Chart hits during 1966–67 on the Pye label: "Water" (which reached no. 39), "Hi Hi Hazel" (no. 45), "Que Sera Sera" (no. 43) and "Michael (The Lover)" (no. 39). They managed to build up a strong following with the crowds due to their energetic tour performances. Like their Pye label mates and rivals Jimmy James and the Vagabonds, they became popular with the mod scene. The band broke up in the autumn of 1969, with the band members going their own ways while Geno Washington continued as a solo artist, prior to returning to the United States. Keyboard player Geoff Pullum became an academic linguist, and is today emeritus professor at the University of Edinburgh.

== Career ==
=== 1960s ===
It was reported by Record Mirror in the magazine's July 13, 1968, issue that Washington was writing and looking to direct a documentary about racism. With the majority of the filming to be done in London, there was to be added clips that showed racial violence in South Africa. With a budget of £12,000 the planned release was to be some time after January 1969. It was also announced that Washington was writing a book, One Way Ticket to the White House which was to be released in paperback form in the UK and US sometime in 1968.

=== 1970s ===
Washington left the UK to return to the United States and disappeared from the music industry for a length of time. He studied hypnosis and meditation, made acquaintance with The Beach Boys and recorded some music with them that was never released. He would later record three albums for the DJM label, Geno's Back (1976), Live (1976), and That's Why Hollywood Loves Me (1979).

In May 1976, he released a single, "You Lovely Witch". Washington co-produced it with Kaplan Kaye. It was released on DJM 1011. A Single Pick for May 29, 1976, Record World predicted that a lot of plays would pick up R&B action.

=== 1980s ===
He was encouraged to make a comeback in 1980 due to the rekindled interest in him resulting from the Dexys Midnight Runners hit single "Geno" but he initially declined, as he was completing his degree in hypnotism. Soon he was back in the UK touring extensively and playing many gigs, particularly in south-east London. Washington was appearing at the Triad Leisure Centre at Bishop's Stortford on December 5, 1980.

=== 1990s to present ===
Washington has been active on stage, recording and releasing new music on various labels, with titles such as "Change Your Thoughts You Change Your Life", "Live Sideways", "Loose Lips", "Put Out the Cat", "The Return of the G", "Take This Job and Stuff It" and "What's in the Pot?". As of 2021, Washington and his band could be regularly seen touring in the UK. In January 2009 he released a single "I'm Doing 99 Years" and the proceeds from the single's sales will go to the victims of crime and child abuse. In July 2009 he headlined the Kelvedon Free Music Festival. In August 2010, Geno Washington & the Ram Jam Band were one of the headline acts at Rhythm Festival, and appeared at the Gulbenkian Theatre, Canterbury in October 2010. In October 2014, they performed in the Spiegeltent at the Canterbury Festival of Arts.

== Television and film career ==
Washington has appeared on television since the 1960s. In 1966 he appeared in Episode 11 of Ready Steady Go! This episode also featured other stars such as Françoise Hardy, Cilla Black, Wayne Fontana and the Spencer Davis Group. In 1967, along with the Ram Jam Band, he appeared on The Record Star Show and doubtless others in the 1960s. Since then he has appeared on Top Ten (1980) in 2000 and the mini series S.O.U.L.—Sounds of Underground London in 2003.

Geno appears in the movie A Bit of Tom Jones?, which had its London premiere in 2009. The film, which was made by Tred Films in Tredegar in South Wales, stars Jonny Owen and Roger Evans, with a cast including Matt Berry, John Henshaw and Denise Welch. The film won the BAFTA Cymru "Best Film" award in 2010.

He has embraced acting, taking a role in Paparazzo, a 1995 film starring Nick Berry and Fay Masterson. In 2007 he appeared as himself in an episode of Midsomer Murders, entitled "The Axeman Cometh", that also featured Suzi Quatro and Mike Read.

== Writing and public speaking ==
He is the author of The Blood Brothers, a war exploitation story. Washington has also written children's stories. He has appeared as a motivational speaker.

== Hypnotism ==
Washington is a member of the Guild of Hypnotists. He has also included hypnotism as part of his act. In the past his show has consisted of some demonstrations of hypnotism in the first half and some "Get down soul music" in the second half.

== More recent activities ==
He recently collaborated with comedian and musician Matt Berry for the track "Get Here in Time". Also in other activities involving Matt Berry, Washington is featured on a 2012 song by Berry called "Theme From Snuff Box".

== Personal life ==
Geno met his wife Frenchie at The Bag O'Nails club in London, which is also where her sister met Peter Noone of Herman's Hermits, whom she married. This is also the same club where Paul McCartney met Linda Eastman.

== Solo discography ==
=== Albums ===
- Geno's Back – DJM DJF 20457 – 1976
- Geno Live – DJM DJF 20486 – 1976
- That's Why Hollywood Loves Me – DJM DJF 20561 – 1979
- Put Out the Cat – Teldec AP 624665 – 1981
- Live Sideways – Ammunition GENO LP1 – 1986
- Take That Job and Stuff It – Konnexion KOMO 788027 – 1987

==== CD album ====
- Change Your Thoughts You Change Your Life (With the Purple Aces) – Thunderbird CSA 114 – 1998

=== Singles ===
==== 7" singles ====
- "Alison Please"/"Each and Every Part of Me" – PYE 7N 45019 – 1971
- "Feeling So Good (Skooby Doo)"/"My Little Chickadee" – PYE 7N 45085 – 1971
- "Dirty, Dirty"/"Give 'Em a Hand" – PYE 7N 45121
- "End of the World"/"Tell Me Tell Me Please" – DJM DJS 10365 – 1975
- "Hold on Momma"/"Help I'm in Love Again" – DJM DJS 10392 – 1975
- "Love Me Love Me"/"Hold On" – DJM DJS 10642 – 1976
- "Oh Pretty Woman"/"B.S.E. Love" – DJM DJS 10669 – 1976
- "Your Love Keeps on Haunting Me"/"La La La" – DJM DJS 10712 – 1976
- "Soothe Me"/"My Kind of Love" – DJM DJS 10761 – 1977
- "Boogie Queen"/"Why Did You Go Away?" – DJM DJS 10803 – 1977
- "Proud Mary"/"Stir It Up" – DJM DJS 10825 – 1978
- "My Money Your Money"/"Get Some Bad Tonight" – DJM DJS 10919 – 1979
- "Baby Come Back"/"Caught in the Middle" – DJM DJS 10926 – 1979
- "Michael (The Lover)"/"Accept My Invitation" – Soul Supply 7SS101 – 1984
- "Rock the Car"/"Catch Me" – Mil MILS 1 – 1988
- "Jingle Bells"/"Rock the Car" – G Kap GKA 001 – 1988

==== 12" singles ====
- "Baby Come Back"/"Caught in the Middle" – DJM DJR 10926 – 1979
- "My Money Your Money"/"Get Some Bad Tonight" – DJR 18005 – 1979
- "Michael (The Lover)"/"Accept My Invitation" / "Emergency 999" – Soul Supply 12SS101 – 1984
- "Rock the Car"/"Catch Me" – Mil MILST 1 – 1988

==== CD single ====
- "The Blues Walks with Me"/"Wake Me When the Morning Comes" – Thunderbird CSA 007 – 1998
