= Harold Lawton =

British academic (1899–2005)

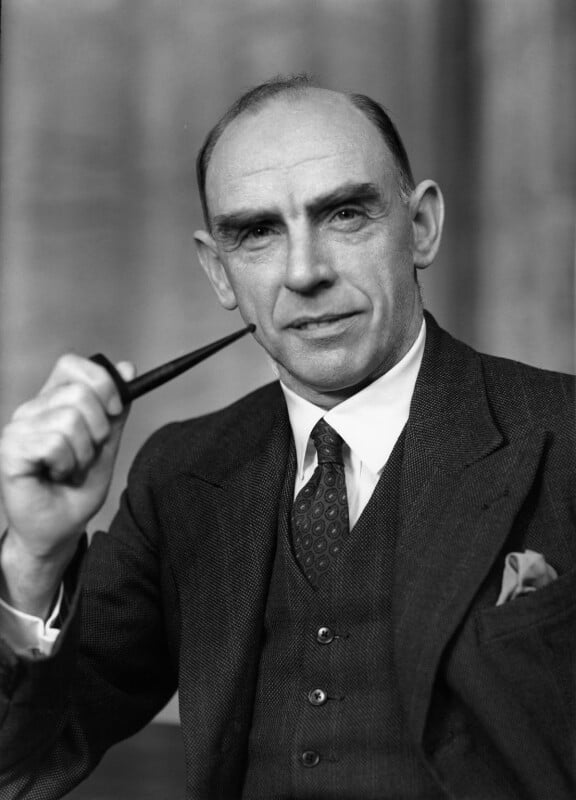
- Lawton in 1949
- Born: 27 July 1899; Burslem, Stoke-on-Trent, England
- Died: 24 December 2005 (aged 106); Greetham, Rutland, England
- Occupations: Scholar and educationist
- Awards: Legion of Honour

Harold Walter Lawton (27 July 1899 – 24 December 2005) was an English scholar of French literature who taught at the University of Sheffield. Lawton was one of the last surviving veterans and the last prisoner of war of the First World War in Britain.

Born in Burslem, Stoke-on-Trent, he was educated at Middle School, Newcastle-under-Lyme, and at Rhyl Grammar School. After being a member of the OTC, he entered military service in 1916, enlisting with the Royal Welch Fusiliers before being transferred to the Cheshire Regiment. Upon completing training, in 1917 he was posted to the Western Front where he was transferred again, to The East Yorkshire Regiment. During the German spring offensive of 1918 his unit, the 1/4th Battalion the East Yorkshires, was sent to reinforce the line at Béthune.

The Germans used infiltration tactics, where stormtroopers aimed to infiltrate weak points in defences, bypassing strongly held front line areas. Troops with heavier weapons would then attack the isolated strongpoints. Lawton, with troops from the Durham Light Infantry, did indeed become isolated in a forward trench during the assault; when they ran out of ammunition and food after three days' fighting, they surrendered. He was imprisoned at a prisoner-of-war camp at a fort in Lille and afterwards in Minden, Germany.

After the war, he completed a Master's degree in French at the University of Wales in Bangor, and received a doctorate in Latin and French from the Sorbonne in 1926. He became a lecturer, then a Professor of French at the University College Southampton. He later took the position of Professor of French, and was promoted within the university administration as Dean of the Faculty of Arts and Pro Vice-Chancellor, at the University of Sheffield.

During World War II, he briefed behind the lines operatives and was listed in The Black Book of key people to be arrested upon a successful Nazi invasion of Britain.

He published a Handbook of French Renaissance Dramatic Theory in 1950, and Poems, Selected with Introduction and Notes (on the work of Joachim du Bellay) in 1961.

In 1999, Lawton received the Legion of Honour of the French Republic, honouring his services in the First World War.

He died on 24 December 2005 at the age of 106 in Greetham, Rutland.

== Selected publications ==
- Vernacular Literature in Western Europe, in The New Cambridge Modern History, vol. I, The Renaissance, 1493-1520 (1957)
