= Greetham, Rutland =

Village in Rutland, England

Coordinates: 52.720°N 0.631°W

Greetham
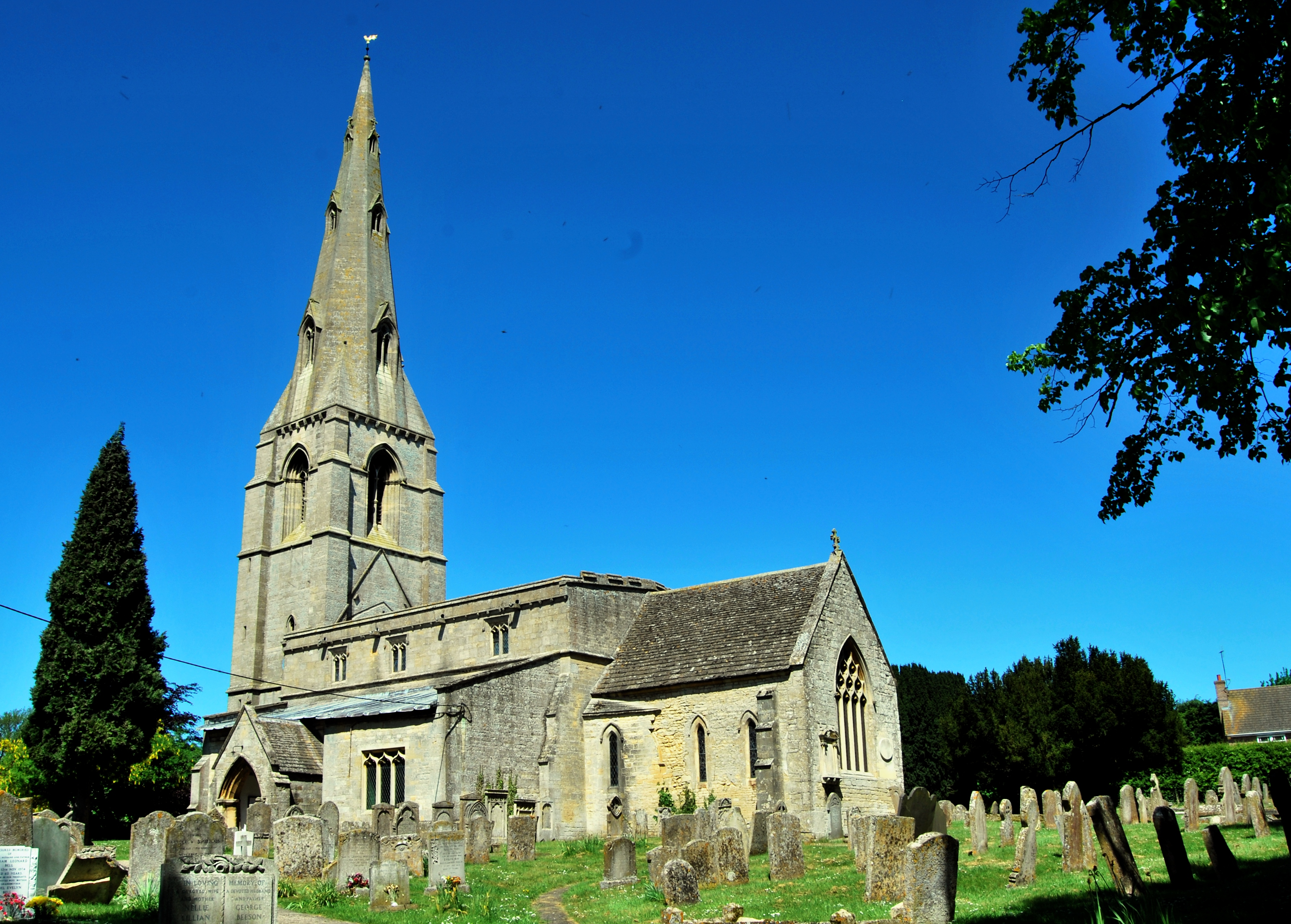
- Church of St Mary the Virgin, Greetham

- Location within Rutland
- Area: 4.81 sq mi (12.5 km^{2})
- Population: 609 2001 census
  - Density: 127/sq mi (49/km^{2})
- OS grid reference: SK9214
  - London: 87 miles (140 km) SSE
- Unitary authority: Rutland
- Shire county: Rutland
- Ceremonial county: Rutland
- Region: East Midlands
- Country: England
- Sovereign state: United Kingdom
- Post town: Oakham
- Postcode district: LE15
- Dialling code: 01572
- Police: Leicestershire
- Fire: Leicestershire
- Ambulance: East Midlands
- UK Parliament: Rutland and Stamford
- Website: Greetham, Rutland

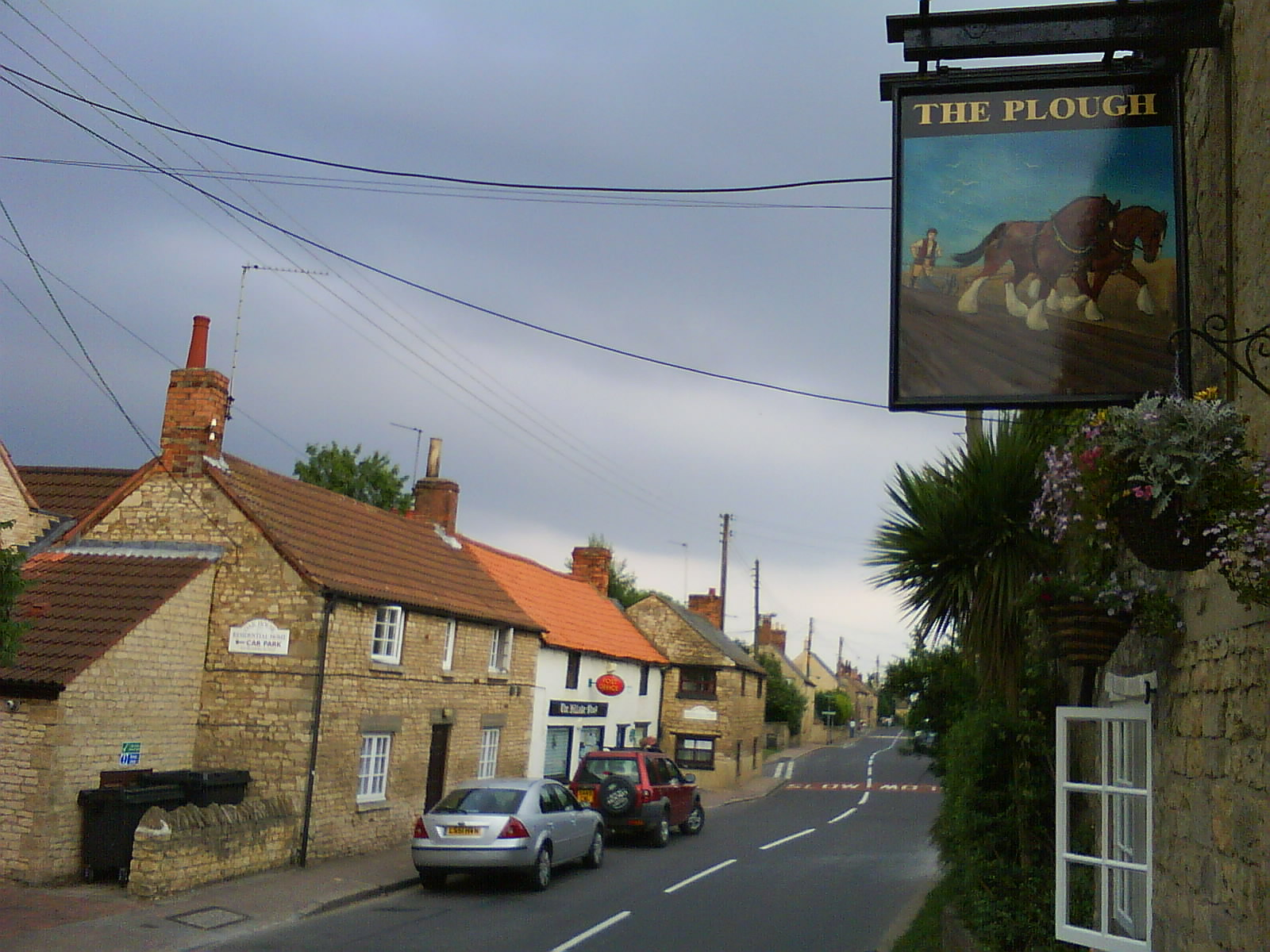
The main street of Greetham

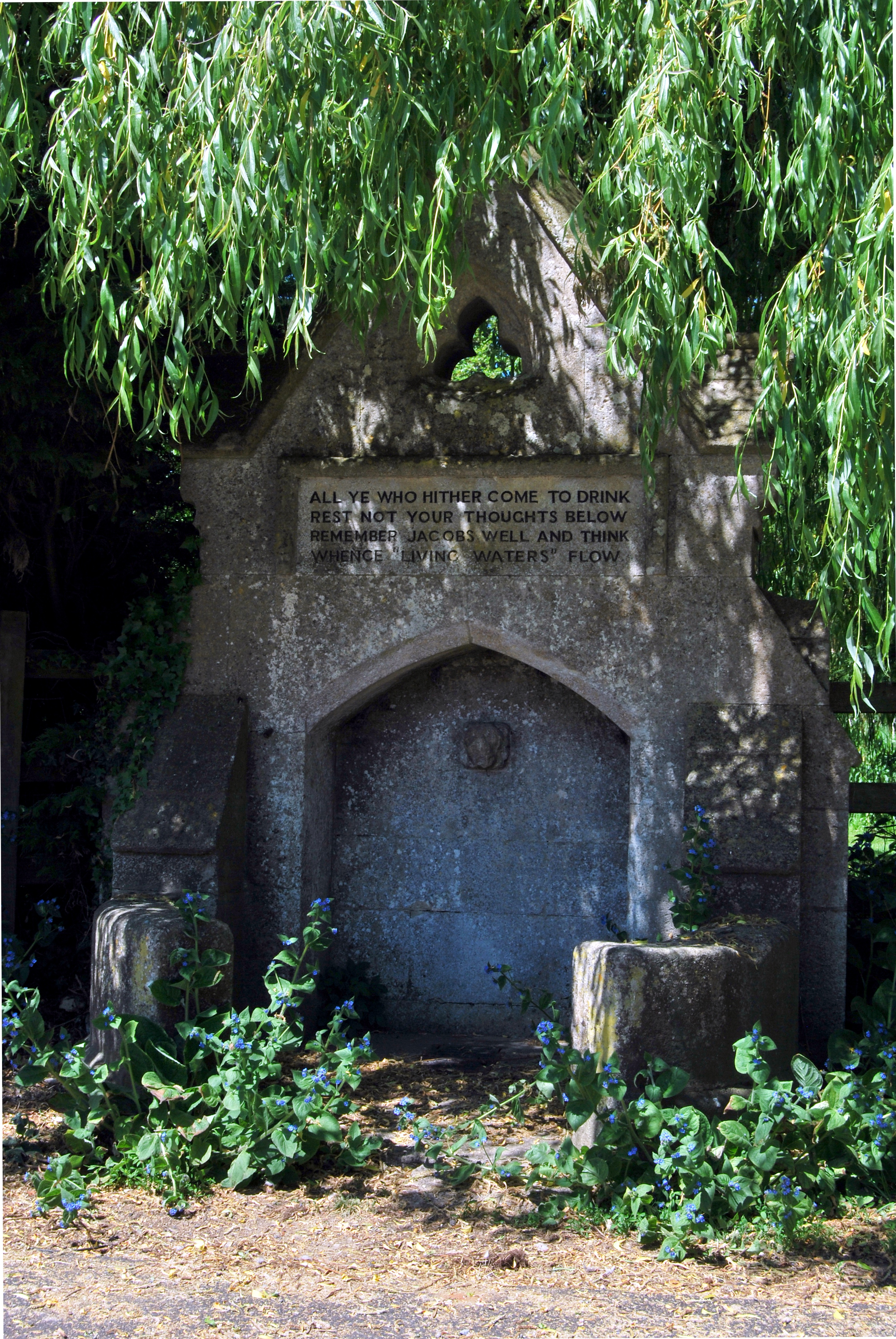
Village well

Greetham is a village and civil parish in the county of Rutland in the East Midlands of England.

The village's name means 'homestead/village which is gravelly' or 'hemmed-in land which is gravelly'.

The village is on the B668 road between the county town of Oakham and the A1 and on the north–south Viking Way long distance footpath linking the Humber Bridge and Oakham. The population of the civil parish at the 2001 census was 609 increasing to 638 at the 2011 census.

The oldest parts of the Church of England parish church of St Mary the Virgin are Norman, but the church today is largely as it was rebuilt in the 13th–15th centuries. The west tower and spire are 13th or 14th century and the south porch was built in 1673. The church was restored in 1897 by Jethro Cossins. The church is a Grade I listed building. It is on Historic England's Heritage at Risk Register, at priority category: C – "slow decay; no solution agreed".

Leicestershire and Rutland Wildlife Trust owns Merry's Meadows nature reserve, a SSSI in the parish that is important for species characteristic of unimproved grassland. East of the village just before the Sewstern Lane junction, just north of the B668 is Greetham Lime Quarry owned by the Dickerson Group of Waterbeach.

Greetham has two pubs: the Plough and the Wheatsheaf, both on the B668. To the east is the Greetham Valley golf course. On the A1 near Stretton is a former pub, the Olde Greetham Inn, now owned by Construction Interior Design.

The village well, of mid-19th century, has an inscription; "All ye who hither come to drink/Rest not your thoughts below/Remember Jacob's well and think/Whence "living waters" flow." It is Grade II listed.

== Notable people ==
- Harold Lawton (1899–2005), one of the last First World War veterans
- John Senescall (1853–1937), cricketer

== Sources ==
- Pevsner, Nikolaus (1960). Leicestershire and Rutland. The Buildings of England. Harmondsworth: Penguin Books. p. 301.
