= Mud Men (TV series) =

British television series

- Genre: History
- Presented by: Johnny Vaughan; Steve Brooker; Nick Stevens
- Country of origin: United Kingdom
- Original language: English
- No. of episodes: 30

Production
- Production company: ITN Productions

Original release
- Network: History
- Release: 27 February 2011

Mud Men is a British television series on the History channel, following members of the Mudlarks Society as they hunt for items on the River Thames foreshore. The series is presented by Johnny Vaughan and Steve "Mud God" Brooker, chairman of the Mudlarks Society. In the third season, the last of the series to air, Nick "Rock" Stevens had a recurring role.

== Format ==
The first half of the show is spent searching the foreshore. After the search, they are joined by their expert who then gives them a historical research "mission" based on their finds.

== Awards ==
Mud Men was highly commended in the Popular Factual Programme category at the Broadcast Digital Awards 2011
