= Hand Clappin, Foot Stompin, Funky-Butt ... Live! =

Live album by Geno Washington & the Ram Jam Band
- Released: December 1966
- Label: Piccadilly NSPL.38026
- Producer: John Schroeder

Geno Washington & the Ram Jam Band chronology
Hand Clappin, Foot Stompin, Funky-Butt ... Live! (1966)	Hipsters, Flipsters, Finger-Poppin' Daddies! (1967)

Hand Clappin, Foot Stompin, Funky-Butt ... Live! is a live album by Geno Washington & the Ram Jam Band, released around December 1966.

== Background ==
Released in 1966, the album was reviewed by Allen Evans in the December 3 issue of New Musical Express. The saxophone playing by Lionel Kingham on "Land of a Thousand Dances" was also noted.

It was an attempt to capture the atmosphere of the group's live stage show. Straight away it registered in the UK charts, peaking at number five and staying in the top ten for three months. It was still in the top 40 in July the following year. For three years the album remained the biggest selling album for Pye Records. In the United States, it was a Special Merit pick in the March 4, 1967 issue of Billboard.

== Track listing ==
No.	Title	Length
1.	"Philly Dog"
2.	"Ride Your Pony"
3.	"Up Tight (Everything's Alright)"
4.	"(I'm A) Road Runner"
5.	"Hold On, I'm Comin'"
6.	"Don't Fight It"
7.	"Land of a Thousand Dances, Part 1"
8.	"Land of a Thousand Dances, Part 2"
9.	"Respect"
10.	"Willy Nilly"
11.	"Get Down With It"
12.	"Michael"
13.	"Que Sera Sera"
14.	"You Don't Know (Like I Know)"
