= Stretton, Rutland =

Village in Rutland, England

Coordinates: 52.734°N 0.597°W

Stretton
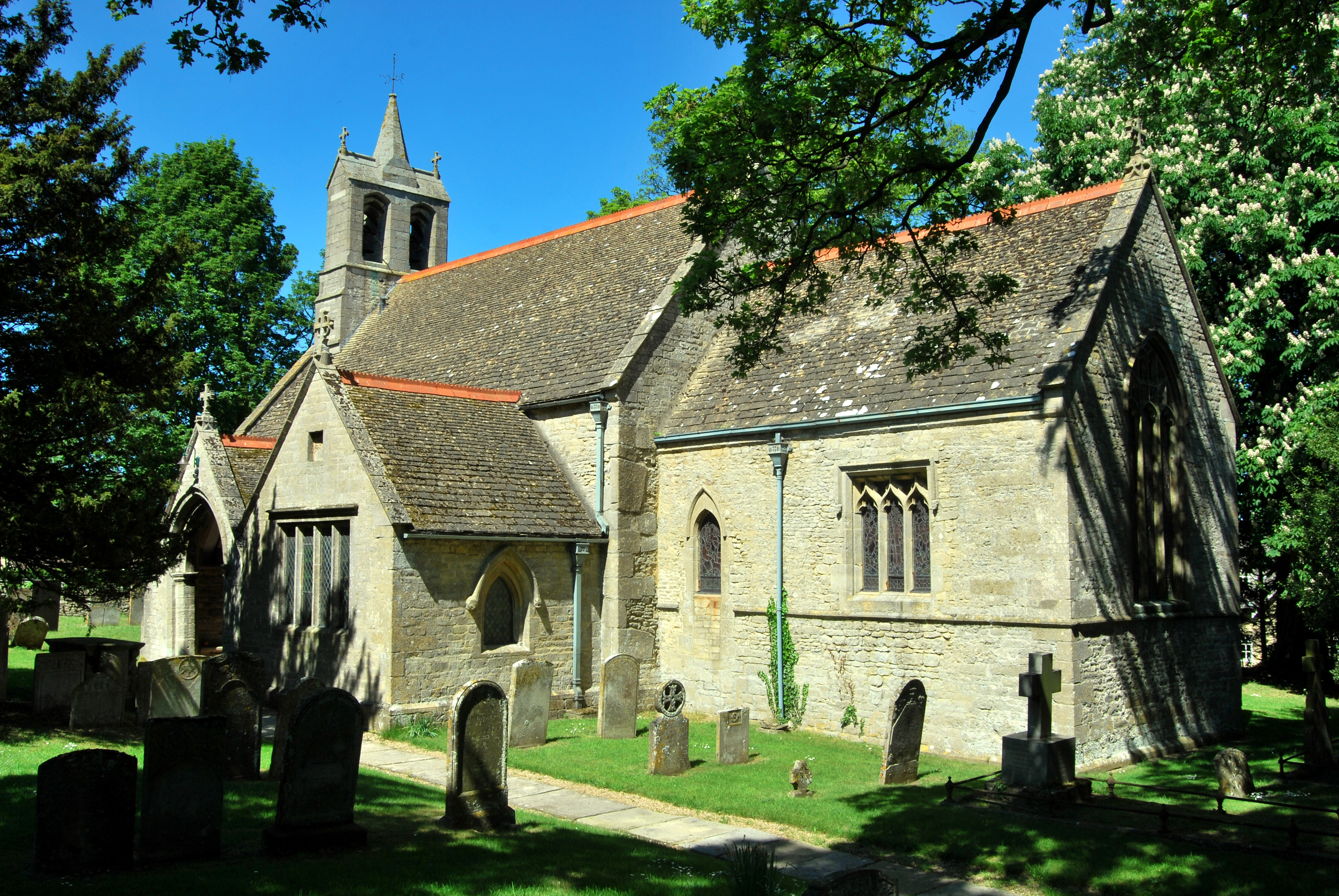
- St Nicholas' Church, Stretton

- Location within Rutland
- Area: 3.09 sq mi (8.0 km^{2})
- Population: 770 2001 Census
  - Density: 249/sq mi (96/km^{2})
- OS grid reference: SK948160
  - London: 88 miles (142 km) SSE
- Unitary authority: Rutland
- Ceremonial county: Rutland
- Region: East Midlands
- Country: England
- Sovereign state: United Kingdom
- Post town: OAKHAM
- Postcode district: LE15
- Dialling code: 01572
- Police: Leicestershire
- Fire: Leicestershire
- Ambulance: East Midlands
- UK Parliament: Rutland and Stamford

Stretton is a village and civil parish in the county of Rutland, England, just off the A1 Great North Road. The population of the civil parish was 770 at the 2001 census, including Thistleton and increasing to 1,260 at the 2011 census. The ecclesiastical parish of Stretton shares the same boundaries and is part of the Rutland deanery of the diocese of Peterborough.

== Geography ==
The principal landmark is a large modern prison, HMP Stocken. Stocken Hall itself, dating principally from the seventeenth and eighteenth centuries, was used as the prison farm from the 1950s until the 1980s and is now converted into apartments. Of the seventeen Strettons in England, all but two are on Roman roads, and Stretton in Rutland is no exception, being situated on Ermine Street.

The civil parish extends along the east side of the A1 up to the edge of Morkery Wood. It also extends at this point to the west side of the A1, as far south as Hooby Lane, and includes Hooby Lodge.

The B668 (for Oakham) meets the A1 at a junction, improved in 1971 when the A1 was dualled to Great Casterton.

== History ==
The village's name means "farm/settlement on a Roman Road" in Anglian and Old English. The village is situated on Ermine Street.

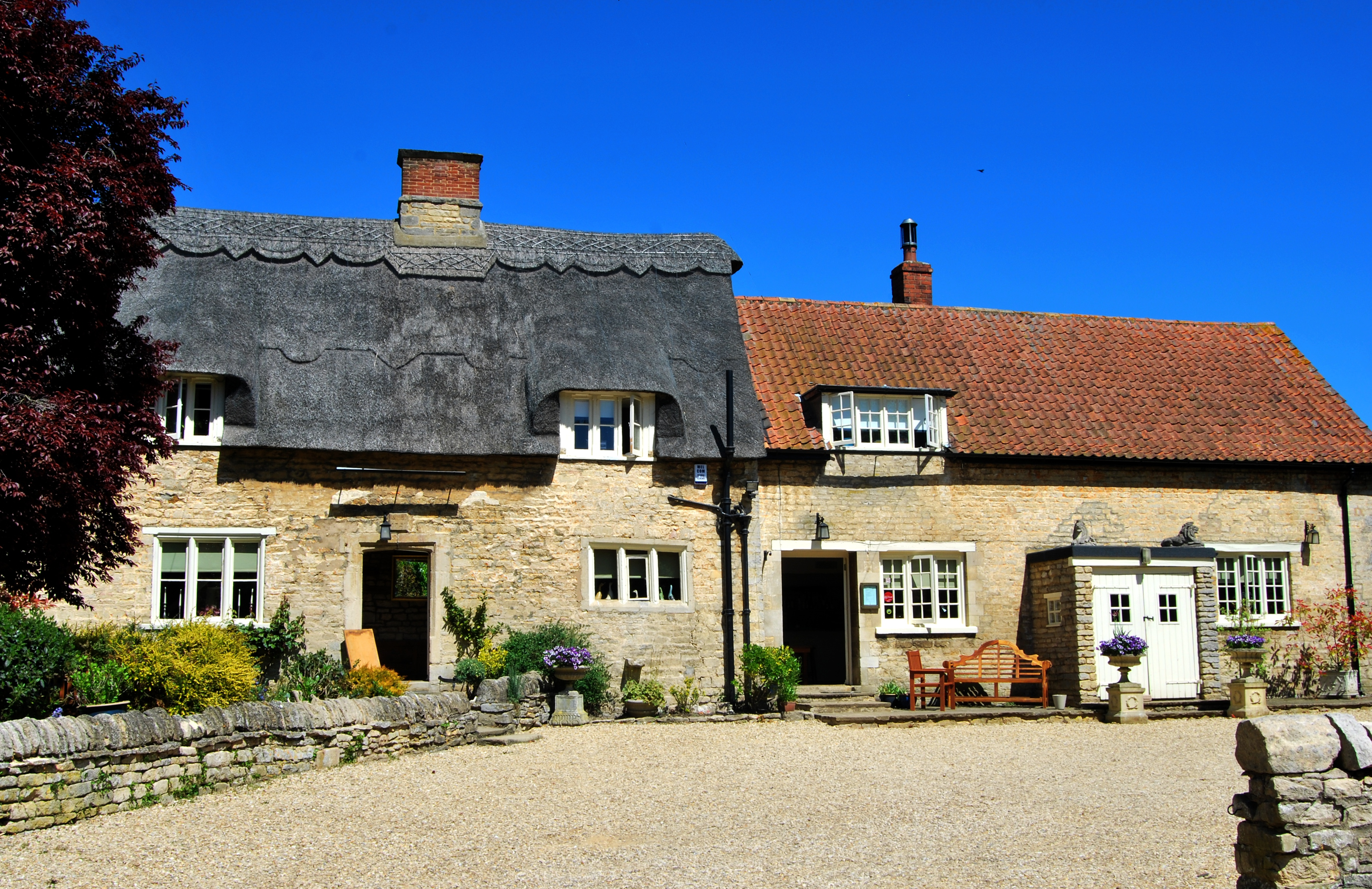
The Jackson Stops

The pub is called the Jackson Stops (the name of an estate agent). It was previously called the White Horse but was for sale for so long with the estate agents' sign outside that it is now officially called by their name.

The Ram Jam Inn (former Winchelsea Arms), situated on the Great North Road next to a service station, is just inside the parish of Greetham. It was bought by the then-owner of Stocken Hall, Major Charles Fleetwood-Hesketh (1871–1947), in the 1920s, who transformed it into a well-known roadside inn. He was also a Deputy Lieutenant of Lancashire, as was his son, Roger Fleetwood-Hesketh, who became a Conservative MP.

Geno Washington & the Ram Jam Band took their name from the inn in the 1960s. Also in the parish of Greetham is the former Greetham Inn (previously the New Inn).

The parish church is dedicated to St Nicholas. Rev. Edward Bradley (rector of Stretton, 1871–83), who wrote as Cuthbert Bede, and who paid for its restoration, is buried in the churchyard.

== Sources ==
- William Page, ed. (1935). A History of the County of Rutland. Victoria County History. Vol. 2. pp. 145–151, 'Parishes: Stretton'. Extensive historical notes
- Samuel Lewis, ed. (1848). A Topographical Dictionary of EnglandA. pp. 246–250 'Streatham - Stretton-upon-Dunsmore'.
