= Sunburst (disambiguation) =

Sunburst is a graphic design term for the pattern seen in fanlights and other architectural elements.

Sunburst may also refer to:

== Further graphic/artistic/symbolic usage ==
- Sunburst (finish), a type of finish for musical instruments
- Sunburst (symbol), a rayed solar symbol or rayed halo
  - the Argead Star in classical Greek iconography
  - Sunburst flag, an Irish Republican flag
- a tie-dye pattern

== Arts and entertainment ==
- Sunburst (Eddie Henderson album), 1975
- Sunburst (Loudness album), 2021
- Sunburst (band), an African rock band formed in 1970
- Sunburst (EP), a 1990 EP by Chapterhouse
- Sunburst (film), a 1975 American film directed by James Polakof
- Sunburst (Magic: The Gathering), an ability used in the Magic: The Gathering card game
- Sunburst Award, a Canadian science fiction award
- Sunburst, a novel by Phyllis Gotlieb
- Sunburst, a character in My Little Pony: Friendship Is Magic

== Other uses ==
- Sunburst (community), in California, US
- Sunburst (dinghy), a dinghy sailing boat
- Sunburst, Montana, a town in the United States
- Sunburst chart
- Airmass Sunburst, ultralight aircraft
- Sunburst, the nickname of the 40th Infantry Division (United States)
- Sunburst, a common name for plants in the genus Pseudobahia
- SUNBURST, a name given to a malware payload implicated in the 2020 United States federal government data breach

== See also ==
- Sunburst Records (disambiguation)
