= Sitsiritsit =

Filipino folk song

Sitsiritsit, also known as Sitsiritsit Alibangbang, is a Filipino folk song. This humorous song describes a flirtatious woman threatening a storeowner that the ants are going to get him if he is not going to extend credit, as well as unusual situations of exchanging a child for a doll or bagoong. It is said to have originated during the country's Spanish colonization, as its lyrics suggest the ordinary life during that time. The melody of the song is similar to Fly, Fly, Fly, the Butterfly, another Filipino folk song but in the English language.

== Lyrics ==
Sitsiritsit, alibangbang
Salaginto't salagubang.
Ang babae sa lansangan
Kung gumiri'y parang tandang.

Santo Niño sa Pandacan
Puto seco sa tindahan
Kung ayaw kang magpautang
Uubusin ka ng langgam.

Mama, mama namamangka
Pasakayin yaring bata
Pagdating sa Maynila
Ipagpalit ng manika

Ale, aleng namamayong,
Pasukubin yaring sanggol
Pagdating sa Malabon,
Ipagpalit ng Bagoong.

Translation:

Cicada, Butterfly (Dragonfly)
Jewelled beetle, Rhinoceros beetle
The woman on the street,
Struts her hips like a rooster.

Holy Child of Pandacan,
Rice cookies at the store.
If you do not extend credit,
The ants will eat you up.

Mister, Mister, rowing a boat,
Kindly take this here child for a ride
Once you reach Manila,
Exchange it for a doll.

Miss, Miss, holding an umbrella,
Kindly take this here baby.
Once you reach Malabón,
Exchange it for shrimp paste.

== Popular culture ==
- In the children's program Batibot, there are two alien puppets named Sitsiritsit and Alibangbang who love discovering new things, places, and people around them.
- In the 1920s, a jazzy version performed with a raspy voice by Vicente Ocampo was popularized on the Manila bodabil circuit.
- In 1962, The Rocky Fellers released "South Pacific Twist", a twist-flavored adaptation of the song by Kal Mann and Dave Appell, on the Parkway label as the B-side to their cover of "Long Tall Sally". Kong Ling, backed by The Fabulous Echoes, released her own version of the song as a single in 1963.
