= Eric Allandale =

Dominica musician (1936–2001)

- Eric Allandale in the studio in the late 1960s

Background information
- Also known as: Eric Allendale, Eric Allan Dale
- Born: Eric Allandale Dubuisson; 4 March 1936; Dominica, West Indies
- Died: 23 August 2001 (aged 65)
- Genres: Jazz, pop
- Occupation: Musician
- Instrument: Trombone
- Years active: 1958–1981
- Label: Columbia
- Formerly of: Eric Allandale Jazz band, Terry Lightfoot band, Alex Walsh band, Edmundo Ros group, The New Orleans Knights, Romeo Z, The Foundations, Sunburst

Eric Allandale (born Eric Allandale Dubuisson 4 March 1936 – 23 August 2001) was a trombonist, songwriter, and bandleader. During the 1960s, he was in number of bands in various genres which included jazz pop and soul.

== Background ==
=== Early life ===
A native of Dominica, West Indies, he moved to the U.K. in 1954 to complete his education. He joined the Hammersmith Borough Brass Band as a trumpeter while working as its council surveyor. He later switched to trombone and formed an amateur band playing jazz.

=== Musical and other ===
Beginning 1958 he performed at the Cellar Club in Soho, then joined bands led by Teddy Layton and Sonny Morris. During the 1960s, he was a member of the Terry Lightfoot and Alex Welsh bands and played with Edmundo Ros. He played trombone and sang in the blues band Dillingers with saxophonist Don Mackrill and bassist Ronnie Shapiro, the brother of Helen Shapiro. He also led his band, The New Orleans Knights and was a member of Romeo Z, and The Foundations during the 1960s.

Allandale also had a period in the 1960s where he found work acting. He appeared in two films and a television show.

Allandale was one of the musicians that Brian Jones would persuade to come back to his flat when he ventured out to catch the jazz shows.

== Eric Allandale Jazz band etc. ==
As advertised in the 19 July 1958 issue of Melody Maker, on the Tuesday, he was appearing at the Star & Garter in Putney and billed as Eric Allandale, his band and guests, and on the Wednesday, his outfit billed as The Eric Allandale Jazz band was appearing at The Cellar. As advertised in the following week issue of Melody Maker (26 July), they appeared to be appearing at Star & Garter again on the Tuesday, and on the Wednesday at The Cellar. and apparently again on the Wednesday at The Cellar. As advertised in the 6 September issue of Melody Maker, on the Friday, Eric Allandale's Jazz Band was appearing at the Bull Hotel, and on the Wednesday at The Cellar. On Friday, 4 October they were appearing at the Co-Op Hall in Gravesend.

== New Orleans Knights ==
New Orleans Knights members

- Eric Allandale – trombone and bandleader
- Jeff Brown – trumpet
- Will Hastie – clarinet
- Eddie Edwards – banjo
- Jim Goudie – bass
- Colin Miller – drums
- Laurie Chescoe – drums
- Mike Wallace - drums

=== Background ===
In the early 1960s Allandale led the New Orleans Knights, (possibly also referred to as The Jazz Knights) who were regulars on the trad jazz circuit. The New Orleans Knights lineups included drummer Colin Miller who, years later, joined the Chris Barber Band; banjo player Eddie Edwards; and drummer Laurie Chescoe. They have been billed as both Eric Allandale's New Orleans Knights and The New Orleans Knights Led by Eric Allandale.

They played a lot of original material and if they felt that a number was not pleasing the crowd, they would drop it. Allandale was quoted by Crescendo in the July 1962 issue saying that they could not play Acker or Kenny if they tried and he would not attempt it for all the money in the world. They also included rare Duke Ellington works in their repertoire as well as arrangements by Kenny Graham.

They recorded for the Columbia label, releasing two singles and were represented by Lyn Dutton Agency.

=== 1961 ===
Eric Allandale's New Orleans Knights

The 28 January 1961 issue of Disc referred to Allandale as the latest addition on the trad Jazz scene. The magazine said that he was the colored trombonist who had featured with the Sonny Morris Band for a long time and now he was leading his own band, The New Orleans Knights. The magazine also noted that he had been in Düsseldorf for the last three months. The line up at the time also included Will Hastie, Geoff Brown, Jim Goudie, Eddie Edwards and Laurie Chescoe.

On Saturday, 25 February, the New Orleans Knights led by Eric Allandale were appearing at the Eel Pie Island Hotel, and they were appearing there on Saturday 25 March and they were appearing again on Saturday April, 1st. They would appear at the venue again at least ten more times.

As of April, 1961, the line up comprised Eric Allandale (trombone and group leader), Will Hastie (clarinet), Geoff Brown (trumpet), Jim Goudie (bass), Eddie Edwards (banjo) and Laurie Chescoe (drums). That month they were appearing at the jazz club in Wood Green on Saturday 15th, West end Ballroom in Birmingham on Sunday 16th, the Marlborough Hall in Wimbledon on Monday 17th, Railway Hotel in Crawley on Wednesday 19th, the jazz club in Swindon on Thursday 20 April, and J. C in Picadilly on Friday 21st.

Making their television debut, group appeared on the TV show, The Sunday Break which was broadcast on ABC on Sunday 3 December 1961.

On Sunday, 24 December 1961, Eric Allandale's New Orleans Knights played at the Cavern. Other groups that played on that date were, The Swinging Blue Jeans and Johnny Sandon and The Searchers.

=== 1962 ===
The group would have two singles released on Columbia's Landsdowne Jazz Series in the UK in 1962. One of the singles, "Little Hans", had Allandale credited as the new music arranger. The 30 December 1961 issue of Cash Box, had mentioned that the group made their disc debut with "Dominican Carnival" on the Columbia Records Landsdowne Series. It was due for release on 19 January 1962. When the single was released, "Little Hans (Hanschen klein)" was the A side and "Dominican Carnival" was on the B side. It was also released in Germany on Metronome label, catalogue no. B 1521.

Along with The Confederates Jazz band, they appeared on Discs-A-Gogo which was aired on 8 February 1962.

On 6 March Eric Allandale and his New Orleans Knights were appearing at the Jazzshows Jazz Club.

Allandale was pictured on the front cover of the 14 March 1962 issue of Jazz News.

On 22 April, Allandale and group were appearing at the Brighton Chinese Jazz Club for an All Night Rave with Len Baldwin and the Dauphin Street Six, and the New City Jazzmen. On the 24th of that month they were appearing at the Aylesbury Social Club.

On 1 June, Eric Allandale and the New Orleans Knights were broadcasting on EMI's Friday Spectacular which would be heard on Radio Luxembourg. The writer for Disc, Owen Bryce said in the 26 May issue that the group was well worth a listen for their special arrangements.

It was noted in the 22 September 1962 issue of Disc that Laurie Chescoe had left the New Orleans Knights to join Monty Sunshine's Jazz Band where he was replacing Ron Darby. According to the 29 September issue of Disc, Mike Wallace was one of the drummers filling in the spot since the departure of Chescoe. He had previously been with Nat Gonella and Sonny Morris. It was also reported in the issue that Allandale was giving a free show to the inmates at Wandsworth jail on the Wednesday.

Allandale's group was appearing at The Corn Exchange in Bristol on 5 October with the Clyde Valley Stompers for an all-night gig.

=== 1963 ===
Billed as Eric Allendale and his New Orleans Knights, they were appearing at the Jazzshows Jazz Club at 100 Oxford Street in London on 21 January 1963. Another scheduled appearance for the group at the Jazzshows Jazz Club was on 28 May.

New Orleans Knights led by Eric Allendale

Appearing at the Jazzshows Jazz Club on 4 July, they were now billed as New Orleans Knights led by Eric Allendale. They were still billed as New Orleans Knights led by Eric Allendale and still appearing at the club on 13 August.

By June 1963, the line up comprised Eric Allandale (trombone, leader), Ken Simms (trumpet), Will Hastie (clarinet), Eddie Edwards (banjo), Leslie Harper (bass) and Dick Thing (drums). This line up of the group was appearing at the 3rd Northern Jazz Festival at Redcar Racecourse. The group was starting off the evening in the 7:30 pm to 8:30 pm slot followed by Al Fairweather - Sandy Brown All Stars with Tony Coe in the 8:30 pm slot. Chris Barber was also appearing that evening. The New Orleans Knights had one more gig with the 10:30 pm to 11:30 pm slot.

The group was appearing at the Redcar Jazz Club at Coatham Hotel with The Swinging Blue Jeans on 5 August.

== Break up ==
It was after his group broke up that he played with Terry Lightfoot and Alex Welsh.

=== Line ups ===
Line up as of April, 1961

- Eric Allandale (trombone and group leader)
- Geoff Brown (trumpet)
- Laurie Chescoe (drums)
- Eddie Edwards (banjo)
- Jim Goudie (bass)
- Will Hastie (clarinet)

Line up as of June, 1963

- Eric Allandale (trombone, leader)
- Eddie Edwards (banjo)
- Leslie Harper (bass)
- Will Hastie (clarinet)
- Ken Simms (trumpet)
- Dick Thing (drums)

=== Later years ===
Their track "Enjoy Yourself (It's Later than You Think)" was included on the 2022 compilation, Gotta Get a Good Thing Goin': The Music of Black Britain in the Sixties. Music magazine Uncut referred to their performance of the song as a rambunctious version.

== Romeo Z ==
In the mid-1960s, Allandale was a member of a group called Romeo Z. The group was led by Stan Chaman. Other members included Stan's brother Clive Chaman on Bass, Eddie Cuansa on trumpet, Allandale on trombone, Erwin Clement on drums and Jerry Elboz (a.k.a. Jerry Elbows) on conga and vocals. It was noted by Barry Dawson in the July, 1967 issue of Crescendo that Jerry Day (who was the leader at the time), guitarist Stan Chaman, Allandale, and Clive Chaman were the nucleus of the group with other members as required.

They were discovered by Stanley Myers and Barry Fantoni who spotted them playing at the Chi-Chi club one night. Myers and Fantoni had stopped in to the club and were discussing the kind of switched on song they needed for a switched-on intense movie. There they saw Romeo Z performing and subsequently enlisted the band to record the song "Kaleidoscope" which was used in the film, Kaleidoscope. A single-sided promo 45 of the track was released on KAL 1. The song also appeared on the soundtrack that was released in October that year.

They recorded a single "Come Back, Baby Come Back" bw "Since My Baby Said Goodbye" which was produced by Irving Martin. It was released on CBS 202645 in 1967. It was listed in the CB New Hit Singles selection in the 1 April issue of Melody Maker. It got a brief review in the Shop Window section of the 8 April 1967 issue of New Musical Express. The raw vibrant excitement, Latin and R&B influences, congas and brass were noted.

== The Foundations ==
In 1967 he became a member of the multi-racial English soul group The Foundations, playing in the horn section with Jamaican saxophonists Mike Elliott and Pat Burke. Allandale was working at night and he went along to hear The Foundations. He said they weren't getting any work done, just practising for four, five and six hours a day. Because he was working nights, he decided to join the group.

While with The Foundations, Allandale came no. 14 in the Brass & Woodwind category of the 1967 Beat Instrumental Gold Star Awards.

He played on their hits "Baby, Now That I've Found You", "Back on My Feet Again", "Build Me Up Buttercup" and "In the Bad Bad Old Days" and was a member of the band until it broke up in 1970.

In the 14 December 1967 issue of Melody Maker, Eric Allandale was supposedly interviewed for the In the New Blind Date section. A sketch of Mike Elliott was used instead of his, which could also suggest that it was Elliott who was interviewed instead of him.

It was reported by Melody maker in the 14 September 1968 issue that the group was trying out Warren Davis of the Warren Davis Monday Band to replace Clem Curtis. It was reported that in the same month, The Foundations had performed at the Brave New World in Portsmouth without drummer Tim Harris who was out of action due to a poisoned arm. Eric Allandale filled in for him as the drummer. They were also set to go into the studio in October to record and it was speculated that it would be with the new singer. During his time with the group, Allandale acted as a type of spokesperson for them.

Allandale would do some work on the Foundations single "Baby, I Couldn't See" in 1969.

== Songwriting and production ==
=== Compositions ===
An early example of his composition ability was Romeo Z's "Come Back Baby Come Back" where he shared the credits with S. Charman, C. Charman, and J. Elbows. he co-wrote the B side with C. Charman.)

He wrote a number of songs that were recorded by the Foundations as well as other artists. The first appearance of his solo song writing efforts was on the flip side of the Foundations third single, "Any Old Time (You're Lonely And Sad)" called "We Are Happy People". This song was also recorded by a Scandinavian group called Slams Creepers, backed with "I Just Couldn't Get You Out of My Mind" and released in 1968 on Bill BT 128. It was a hit for them and made it into the Scandinavian Top Five. It was also released as the flip side to a 1969 single, "Remains To Be Seen", recorded by Irish show band The Pacific Show Band, released on Tribune TRS 125. It was also re-recorded by The Foundations featuring Colin Young and appeared on their 1968 Marble Arch album. According to the 26 April 1969 issue of Billboard, nine different acts in as many countries had recorded the song.

Other songs written by him were "I Can Feel It", "Who Am I ?" and "Solomon Grundy". This latter song which appeared on the album, Digging The Foundations, was covered by Pye labelmates Pickettywitch, and a Hong Kong-based beat group, Danny Diaz & The Checkmates. Allandale was commissioned to write a straight pop song for this band from the Philippines. Allandale and The Foundations also hosted their visit to London. It was the song that Polly Brown and Pickettywitch were first noticed with when they appeared on ITV's Opportunity Knocks television talent show. It was also the B-side of Pickettywitch's 1969 debut single "You've Got Me So I Don't Know".

With "Born to Live, Born to Die", which Allandale composed, he also served as musical director Allandale had composed for the group before, but this was his first attempt in composing an A side for The Foundations. Strings were also incorporated into the recording. Allandale also had an idea to use bells for the intro and they were looking everywhere for the right sound until he went to the BBC library and made his choice from 2,000 samples. The result was that the group was happier with this record as previously with Tony Macaulay, he stopped them from doing other things. With their review in the 13 September 1969 issue, Cash Box said there was an improved production quality and the step into the new sound for the group which was turned up one of their strongest singles since their last top forty surge. The magazine also noted the interesting lyric and performance which could result in an enticement for FM making heavy sales. His composition "I Can Feel It" was covered by German-based American supply sergeant and singer Chuck Bennett as well as Mac Kissoon. Bennett's version was released on Vogue Schallplatten (DV 11000) and reached the German charts. Kissoon's version appears on his Souled Out album.

With James Mpungo he wrote "Ave Africa", which appears on Sunburst's 1976 album.

=== Production ===
In February 1968, Beat Instrumental announced that Barry Class who managed The Foundations had started his own label, Trend Records Ltd. The label already had two records for release that month, "Breaking Up a Dream", by the Ways and Means, and "Speak To Me" by the Explosion. The pressing duties were to be handled by Saga Records. Allandale (spelt as Eric Allan Dale) was named as a producer for the label. The article stated that Allandale's group The Foundations would not have releases on the label.

Working with John Worsley he co-directed the recording of "Baby, I Couldn't See" for The Foundations. The song was written by Worsley and David Myers who had left Southern Music to join Barry Class' Trend label in 1969. Even though Class was credited as the executive producer, Allandale may have had some hand in the production as he was taken on as a producer in 1968. The song did enjoy some popularity in Holland where it was minor hit. Making it on to the Dutch Tipparade chart, it peaked there at no. 8 on week three.

In 1972 a group called Tramp Sonic released a single on RCA called "You're A Man" backed with "Catch A Southbound Train". Allandale wrote the tunes for both sides as well as produced them. "You're a Man" appeared on the Hits Vol.3 Dance Classics album in 1992. The song was credited to Tramps.

== Later years ==
Some time after the Foundations broke up he went to Zambia with a soul band called Matata to play for its independence celebrations. He also joined other musicians in a band that played African jazz and the band became popular locally. He taught music to students in Zambia. learned carving crafts, and then moved to Kenya. He was a member of the band Sunburst and played on the group's 1976 album, Ave Africa.

After four years in Africa he returned to England. In 1977 he played jazz with Laurie Chescoe, a former bandmate from his early jazz years. He tried to reunite with Tim Harris, the former drummer for The Foundations, but was unsuccessful. He opened a junk shop with his partner Olive in Peckham, South London.

In 1981 Allandale went to Paris and worked with Sam Woodyard, former drummer with the Duke Ellington orchestra. He moved to a commune near the Pyrenees and was a founding member of the St Andre Blues Band. In 1983 he returned to England and started a relationship with an artist called Simone and began painting. He worked with an Afro-Caribbean group and later moved back to Paris. In 1989 he had a brain haemorrhage but recovered enough to play the keyboard.

Allandale was one of the Southwark Blue Plaque nominees in 2017.

== Personal life ==
Allandale was born to parents Donald and Darling and had two younger brothers, Derek and Stafford. He was formerly a Catholic. One of his hobbies was painting.

== Death ==
He suffered a stroke in 1999 and died on 23 August 2001 at the age of 65. He was survived by his former wife Lottie, and their three sons. He also had another son who survived him. His wake was held on the 100 year old Dutch barge Dora, owned by his former partner Olive Allison which is still moored by Tower Bridge on the river Thames

== Discography ==
Singles
Act	Release	Catalogue	Year	Notes
The New Orleans Knights Led by Eric Allandale	"Little Hans" / "Dominican Carnival"	Columbia 4773	1962	
The New Orleans Knights Led by Eric Allandale	"Enjoy Yourself (It's Later than You Think)" / "In a Little Spanish Town"	Columbia 4844	1962	
Romeo Z	"Come Back Baby Come Back" / "Since My Baby Said Goodbye"	CBS	1967	co writer sides A&B
Tramp Sonic	"You're a Man" / "Catch a Southbound Train"	RCA	1972	producer and writer, sides A&B
