= Steve Bingham (bassist) =

British musician (born 1949)

- Born: 4 April 1949 (age 77); Solihull, Warwickshire, England
- Genres: Pop, soul, rock
- Occupation: Musician
- Years active: 1960s–present
- Labels: Pye, GM, Epic, Uni Records
- Formerly of: Misty, The Foundations, Development, Jimmy Jewell & Ears, Ronnie Lane & Slim Chance, Slim Chance, Geno Washington & The Ram Jam Band
- Website: www.stevebingham.blogspot.com

Steve Bingham (born 4 April 1949) is an English bass guitarist, best known for being in the band The Foundations in 1970, and remaining with them until their break-up.

== Background ==
Steve Bingham's interest in the bass guitar was awakened at the age of twelve when his sister took him to see a local group called The Strollers.

Bingham joined The Foundations in 1969, felling the position once occupied by Peter Macbeth.

He played on the 1972 Ennismore album by Colin Blunstone, on the 1974 Anymore for Anymore album by Ronnie Lane, and the 1976 album Stars Fade (In Hotel Rooms) by Kevin Westlake. Steve also toured with Ronnie Lane and Slim Chance in "The Passing Show", which took a huge circus tent on the road with dancing girls, fire eaters, clowns and a general assortment of circus people.

== Career ==
=== 1960s to 1980s ===
Bingham was a founding member of the group Misty who came together in 1969. They released a single, "Hot Cinnamon" which wasn't a hit. They also recorded an album in that period. The album wasn't released.

The Foundations

Bingham was pictured with The Foundations in the march 21, 1970 issue of Record Mirror. Bingham only played on a handful of Foundations recordings. However, he did play on "I'm Gonna Be a Rich Man".

Development

By 1971, Bingham was part of Colin Young's group called Development. It featured Young on vocals, Graham Preskett on violin, guitar, banjo, harmonica and melodica, Bingham on bass, Laurie Jerryman on drums, Roger Cawkwell on flute, recorder, alto saxophone, tenor saxophone and baritone saxophone, Jean Roussel on organ and piano and Eddie "Tan Tan" Thornton on trumpet. They recorded an album In the Beginning which was released on the Stateside label. Also that year, Colin Young also had a single, "Any Time at All" bw "You're No Good" released on Trend 6099 005. The producers were Tony Rockliff and Barry Class. It was credited to Colin Young introducing Development. It was also released on Uni 55286. It was a Hot 100 prediction, and was in Billboard's Top 60 Pop Spotlight section for the week ending 5 June 1971.

Further activities

In 1972, Colin Blunstone's album Ennismore was released. Bingam's bass work can be heard punctuating Blunstone's vocal on the track "Pay Me Later".

Bingham played bass on Ronnie Lane's 1974 album Anymore for Anymore. Leading up to his work on the album, Bingham recalled receiving a call from Bruce Rowland who was once a drummer for Joe Cocker and at the time, a current drummer for the group Slim Chance. He was invited to come to a farm in the middle of nowhere near the Welsh Border. There, Lane was living in a small cottage with his family and animals, dogs cats and ducks. After going to pub and having a good session, they came back to the farm and went into his barn to play along with some of Lane's songs. These would be the songs for the album, Anymore for Anymore. Bingham's room to stay in turnout to be an old caravan with a leaking roof, no heating and no facilities.

=== 1990s ===
In 1999, because of the popularity of the film There's Something About Mary, the renewed interest in '"Build Me Up Buttercup" and The Foundations, a version of the band reformed with Colin Young on vocals, Alan Warner on guitar, Bingham on bass, and Gary Moberley on keyboards, etc. The group stayed together for a period of time seeing a change of the lead singer with Hue Montgomery replacing Colin Young. He played on the Soul CLassics 2000 / 2001 album by Alan Warner's Foundations group. Hue (The Duke) Montgomery was on lead vocals, Alan Warner was on guitar and backing vocals, Bingham on bass and backing vocals, Gary Moberley was on keyboards and Sam Kelly was on drums. They were also helped out by Nick Payn, Tony Laidlaw and Peter Rollinson on horns and Michelle Porter on backing vocals and Phillip Harper on percussion.

In recent years Bingham has been a member of Geno Washington and The Ram Jam Band as well as the "Reformed but Unrepentant" reunion edition of Slim Chance with original Slim Chance members Charlie Hart and Steve Simpson.

=== 2000s ===
In 2022, the album that Bingham's group Misty had recorded in 1970 was finally released on Grapefruit Records. It received a three star rating by Music News. In the review, Andy Snipper said that the single "Hot Cinnamon" was "a fine piece of music but possibly too complicated rhythmically to be a dance hit".
