= Diamond Records (Hong Kong) =

Hong Kong record label

- Successor: Polydor
- Formation: 1960 (approx)
- Founder: Ren da Silva
- Founded at: British Hong Kong
- Dissolved: 1970
- Type: Record label
- Legal status: Defunct
- Region served: East Asia
- Official language: English; Chinese

Diamond Records
- Traditional Chinese: 鑽石唱片
- Simplified Chinese: 钻石唱片
Transcriptions
Standard Mandarin
- Hanyu Pinyin: Zuānshí Chàngpiàn
Yue: Cantonese
- Jyutping: Zyun3 Sek6 Coeng3 Pin3

Diamond Records (Chinese: 鑽石唱片; pinyin: Zuānshí Chàngpiàn) was a record label for Hong Kong and Far East. It featured a good amount of Hong Kong's most popular recording acts and attractions in its catalogue.

== Background ==
Diamond Records was an independent label which was established in or around 1960 by Portuguese merchant, Ren da Silva. In the early 1960s, they produced a run of albums that featured original Mandarin and English compositions. Also English songs were sung in Mandarin and Mandarin songs were sung in English. Two recording artists that were an example of this were Kong Ling and Mona Fong. Both Ling and Fong had Hong Kong's leading pianist Celso Carrillo as arranger on their early Diamond albums.

=== Affiliations ===
In the late 50s Diamond obtained a franchise from US Mercury and released many singles – mainly Patti Page The Diamonds and The Crew Cuts and together with US Decca issues on their Echo label they dominated the Hong Kong Charts and even more so when they obtained a Coral agreement and Teresa Brewer, The McGuire Sisters and later Buddy Holly and The Crickets also had huge success. ABC then allowed releases and Paul Anka became a real favourite of the Chinese teenagers and nearly all his singles at that time charted. Strange results from the HK Hit Parade of 1959 saw good sales for titles which hardly listed anywhere else – The Crew Cuts 'Be My Only Love' challenged the Diamonds Little Darlin' and Anka's Late Last Night was a huge success – not many singles were pressed by Diamond due to capacity problems so Airplay on Radio Hong Kong, Commercial Radio Hong Kong, Rediffusion and Radio Sai Wan (RAF Station Radio) were compiled for chart listings. Dot and Roulette pressings were added later and one Mercury release had little to do with the US but charted as the Yee Tin Tong Mandolin Band playing Caio Caio Bambina b/w Oh Marie. It was, for some time available on YouTube but has since disappeared. Although Ren Da Silva owned the company it was his daughter who was the leading light in the singles world and to her must go much of the credit for bringing US and UK music of the late 1950s to the young Chinese students of the time. This 1950s period has been largely neglected but those who were in Hong Kong with the British military will remember the breakthrough Miss Da Silva achieved. In the early 1960s, Diamond was the only record pressing in the area at the time. It handled Mercury Record Corporation product on a licensing agreement basis. Taking a trip to the U.S., managing director da Silva visited the Chicago Mercury headquarters in August 1961 to discuss expansion in the area for manufacturing plant and distribution facilities. He also was in the U.S. to meet with Willem Langenberg the head of Philips group to discuss the coordination of a three way arrangement that would involve Mercury, Philips and Diamond.

== Artists ==
=== Rock bands ===
In the mid-1960s the label started taking on guitar driven bands such as Philip Chan and the Astronotes, Danny Diaz and the Checkmates, Teddy Robin and the Playboys, and The Anders Nelsson group. Later on, other bands such as the Sam Hui fronted Lotus, The Mystics, The Zoundcrackers, D’Topnotes, The Downbeats, Joe Jr. and the Side Effects, Mod East, Sons of Han, and The Menace had recordings issued on the label.

== Arrangers and session musicians ==
=== Celso Carrillo ===
Celso Carrillo, a pianist from the Philippines was born on 9 January 1924. Along with Tony Carpio, Andy Hidalgo, and Nick Domingo, he was one of the many musicians from the Philippines that had made careers in Hong Kong. He had worked as an arranger, backing musician on various recordings by artists on the Diamond label. For a period of time, he was Hong Kong's leading pianist His band backed Kong Ling on her Hong Kong Presents ..... Off-Beat Cha Cha album. In addition to playing piano and handling the arrangements, he also played conga and cow bell on various tracks. Another album for Diamond which he worked on, which was in the same vein as Kong Ling's was Mona Fong Meets Carding Cruz. The backing was by the Carding Cruz band and the arrangements were by Celso Carrillo. Filipino singer Carmen Soriano, credits him with him with giving her the inspiration and training to sing when she was lacking in confidence and repertoire while in Hong Kong. At the time he was the band leader at the club and told her to give it a try just for the novelty of it. The result was her singing for a few months at the Winner House club in Hong Kong. Another singer that Carillo backed was Lita Mendoza. He died on 26 December 1988.

At one time he was also once president of the Philippine Musicians League.

== Later years ==
In 1970, the label was acquired by Polydor.

== Releases (selective) ==
=== International artists ===
Singles

- Marv Lockard – "Love Me Tender" / "Singing The Blues" – Diamond 54 X 45
- Lloyd Price – "Where Were You (On Our Wedding Day)?" / "Is It Really Love?" – Diamond ABC 6 – (1959)
- The Ventures – "Walk-Don't Run" / "Perfidia" – Diamond D.78X 45 – (1960)
- Chubby Checker – "Slow Twistin'" / "La Paloma Twist" – Diamond D.131X 45
- Chubby Checker – "Popeye The Hitchiker" / "Limbo Rock" – Diamond D.158 X 45 – (1962)
- Linda Scott – "I've Told Ev'ry Little Star" / "Three Guesses" – Diamond D.105 X 45 – (1963)
- Chubby Checker – "The Twist" / "Let's Twist Again" – Diamond D.121 X 45 – (1963)
- Johnny Tillotson – "You Can Never Stop Me Loving You" / "Judy, Judy, Judy" – Diamond D.188 X 45 – (1963)
- Chubby Checker – "Twist It Up" / "Surf Party" – Diamond D.189X45 – (1963)

=== Hong Kong artists ===
Singles

- Kong Ling with Celso Carrillo Orch. – "I Love You Baby" / ? – Diamond D.76
- The Fabulous Echoes – "Do The Mashed Potatoes" / "A Little Bit Of Soap" – Diamond D.167 X 45 – (1964)
- The Fabulous Echoes – "Sunshine" / "Dancing on the Moon" – Diamond D.187 X 45 – (1964)
- Danny Diaz & The Checkmates - "Wonderful World" / "Stand By Me" - Diamond D.224 X 45 (1964)
- The Fabulous Echoes – "The Wedding (La Novia)" / "La Novia (The Wedding)" – Diamond D.233 X 45
- Teddy Robin and the Playboys – "Lies" / " Six Days in May" – Diamond D. 238 – (1966)
- The Downbeats – "It Won't Be Easy" / "You Gotta Tell Me" – Diamond D. 243 – (1967)
- Mod East – "Except You" / "No One Can Love You (The Way I Do)" – Diamond D. 261
- Mod East – "Stranger To Love" / "Angelita" – Diamond D 267 – (1968)

EPs

- Celso Carrillo and his Orchestra – Off-Beat in Hong Kong – Diamond EP 100
- The Fabulous Echoes – Those Fabulous Echoes Vol. 1 – Diamond DEP 004
- The Fabulous Echoes – Those Fabulous Echoes Vol. 2 – Diamond DEP 016 – (1965)
