= She's So Fine =

- Australian record label

Single by the Easybeats

from the album Easy
- B-side: "Old Oak Tree"
- Released: 27 May 1965
- Recorded: April–May 1965
- Studio: Armstrong Studios (Melbourne)
- Genre: Power pop; Australian rock
- Length: 2:08
- Label: Parlophone; Albert
- Songwriters: Stevie Wright; George Young
- Producer: Ted Albert

Australian singles chronology
"For My Woman" (1965)	"She's So Fine" (1965)	"Wedding Ring" (1965)

"She's So Fine" is a song written by Stevie Wright and George Young. It was originally recorded by the Australian rock group the Easybeats in 1965, whose version reached number three in the Australian charts.

== Background ==
The basic tracks to "She's So Fine" were recorded in early 1965 at Armstrong Studios in Melbourne. Additional recording took place later when they returned to Sydney. The single was a break-through hit for the Easybeats, gaining them nationwide attention.

== Charts ==
Chart performance for "She's So Fine"
Chart (1965)	Peak position
Australia (Kent Music Report)	3

== Other versions ==
The song was recorded by Danny Diaz & The Checkmates who had it as the B side of their 1966 single, "It's So Easy" which was released on the Diamond label. It was also released on Australia on Stateside OSS 259.
