= Matata (band) =

African rock and funk band

- Also known as: Air Fiesta Matata
- Genres: Afro funk, rock
- Years active: Mid 1960s - 1974
- Labels: President Records, Crystal, Stateside Records, Chairman, RPM Records
- Past members: Steeleson Beauttah; Nashon Gandani; Sammy Kagenda; Jacques Kalunga; Isaac Kisombe; Toby Kombo; John Nzenze; Patrice Oluma; John Otieno; Anwar Richard; Gabby Wamala

Matata was a prominent African rock and funk band that was formed in Nairobi during the 1960s. They released a number of singles and recorded two albums during the early to mid-1970s.

== Background ==
Matata was formed by Kenyan musician John Nzenze. They started out as Air Fiesta Matata. Influenced by Stevie Wonder, The Beatles and South African kwela, they gained popularity with Kenya's younger generation. Along with the Ashantis and the Cavaliers, Air Fiesta Matata was one of the resident bands at Robbie Armstrong's Starlight club in Nairobi. This is where the group became recognized. They were later regarded as an Afro Funk band.

Some of the group's members were refugees from Congo. The group's membership included Steel Beauttah on vocals and Gabriel Wamala on drums. One of Matata's members was exiled South African saxophonist Dudu Pukwana.

The group won the Best Band in Africa Award in a competition organized by the BBC World Service in London. Finding international fame, the group also played to venues in the UK, US, France Germany, Norway and Switzerland.

== Career ==
=== 1960s ===
In 1968, they appeared at the All-African Music Festival in Algeria. There they were ranked as the third best band in Africa. In 1969 they stayed in Ethiopia for several months to perform for Emperor Haile Selassie.

=== 1970s ===
Having won the BBC sponsored competition to find Africa's best band, the ensemble was invited to come to the UK and perform for the BBC. They also played some venues in London and ended up being managed by Pearl Connor. She got them work in the UK and Europe as well as a job as the opening act for Miles Davis. When they got back to London they signed up for a two-album deal with President Records.

In 1972 their debut album Matata – Air Fiesta was released on President Records.

In 1973 there were some issues that would have an impact on the band. with work permits running out they had to return to Kenya. Some members left due to not wanting to divide their time between Nairobi and the UK. At some stage, possibly 1974, former Foundations and future Sunburst member, Eric Allandale went with the group to Zambia. There they played for the Independence celebrations.

== Later years ==
Founding member John Nzenze died on 30 May 2020 at age 80.

== Line ups ==
=== 1971 line up ===
- Steeleson Beauttah – vocals, bongos
- Jacques Kalunga – vocals, drums, congas
- Isaac Kisombe – lead guitar
- Toby Kombo – lead guitar
- John Otieno – rhythm guitar
- Nashon Gandani – tenor sax
- Patrice Oluma – vocals, bongos
- Sammy Kagenda – bass
- Gabby Wamala – drums
- Anwar Richard – keyboard, vocals

=== 1972/1973 line up ===
- Isaac Kisombe – lead guitar
- Tommy Kombo - rhythm guitar
- John Otieno – rhythm guitar
- Patrice Oluma – bongos
- Sammy Kagenda – bass
- Anwar Richard – organ, vocals
- Dudu Pukwana – alto saxophone
- Eddie Tagoe - tumba, conga, shakes, bongos
- Mongezi Feza – trumpet
- John Otieno – rhythm guitar
- Andrew Yonah – lead guitar
- Isaac Kisombe – lead guitar

== Discography ==
Album
Act	Release	Catalogue	Year	Notes
Matata	Air Fiesta	President PTLS 1052	1972	
Matata	Independence	President PTLS 1057	1974	
