= What Are We Gonna Do About It =

Single by Mercy, Mercy
- B-side: "What Are We Gonna Do About It? (Dub Mix)"
- Released: 1985
- Length: 3:53 (7" release); 6:40 (12" release)
- Label: Ensign ENY 522 (7" release); Ensign 12ENY 522 (12" release)
- Songwriter: Young/Tunney
- Producers: Lukey Tunney & Colin Young

Mercy, Mercy singles chronology
"It Must Be Heaven" (1984)	"What Are We Gonna Do About It" (1985)

"What Are We Gonna Do About It" is a 1985 single for Mercy, Mercy. It became a hit for them that year.

== Background ==
"What Are We Gonna Do About It" was written by Colin Young and Luke Tunny, who co-founded Mercy, Mercy with Young. Young was the lead vocalist in the outfit. Keyboardist Tunny and vocalist Young (aka Colin Hughfield Young) teamed up when Young was working on a solo project in or around September 1984. "What Are We Gonna Do About It", released on Ensign/Island ENY 522 was the follow up to their 1984 release "It Must Be Heaven".

== Reception ==
On 27 July 1985, James Hamilton noted the building of the mesmeric long breaks on the dub side of the single. He also said it was "slightly like a hot tempo Phil Fearon."

Paul Sexton of Record Mirror have a short review on the single in the magazine's 24 August issue. He said that it had a Phil Fearon / Galaxy sound and "a real creeper if you give it time".

On the week of 6 October, James Hamilton said that Young and Tunney were causing quite a stir with the "98bpm reggae-soul jogger".

== Airplay ==
For the week of 31 August 1985, Music Week confirmed that the record was on ten I.L.R. station playlists, two of them A lists. On the week of 7 September, the record was on ten I.L.R. station playlists, two more than the previous week. Three stations had it on their A list. It was also on the Radio London A list. On the week of 28 September, the single had gone up from nine regional playlists to sixteen. Four of them were A lists and a station in Stockton had it as a hit pick.

== Charts ==
The Mercy Mercy single made its debut at no. 54 on the Music Week Top 75 Disco & Dance Singles chart on the week of 17 August 1985. It also debuted on the Airplay Action Bubbling chart.

It debuted at no. 85 on the Music Week The Next 25 chart on the week of 24 August and it had moved up from no. 28 on the Top 75 Disco & Dance Singles chart.

On the week of 7 September, the single peaked at no. 9 on the Music Week Top 75 Disco & Dance Singles chart.

On the week of 14 September, the single debuted at no. 12 in the UK Club Play Chart.

By the week of 21 September, it had made its debut at no. 59 in the Music Week Top 75 Singles chart. The following week (28 September), it was at no. 64. This was the song's last week in the Top 75. It had also moved up from no. 10 to no. 9 on the UK Club Play Chart.

On 12 October the single had moved down from no. 9 to no. 15 on the UK Club Play Chart.

The song was still in the Music Week Top 75 Disco & Dance Singles chart at no. 69 on the week of 2 November.

The song came no. 48 in the RM (New Record Mirror) Year End Disco chart.

== Later versions ==
Lewis Berry recorded a version, produced by Rod Gammons which was released on Record Shack Records SOHOT 58 in 1986 as "What Am I Gonna Do About It". A 2017 version appeared on an EP along with "You Lied" and "What Gives You The Right".
