= John Nzenze =

Kenyan musician (1940–2020)

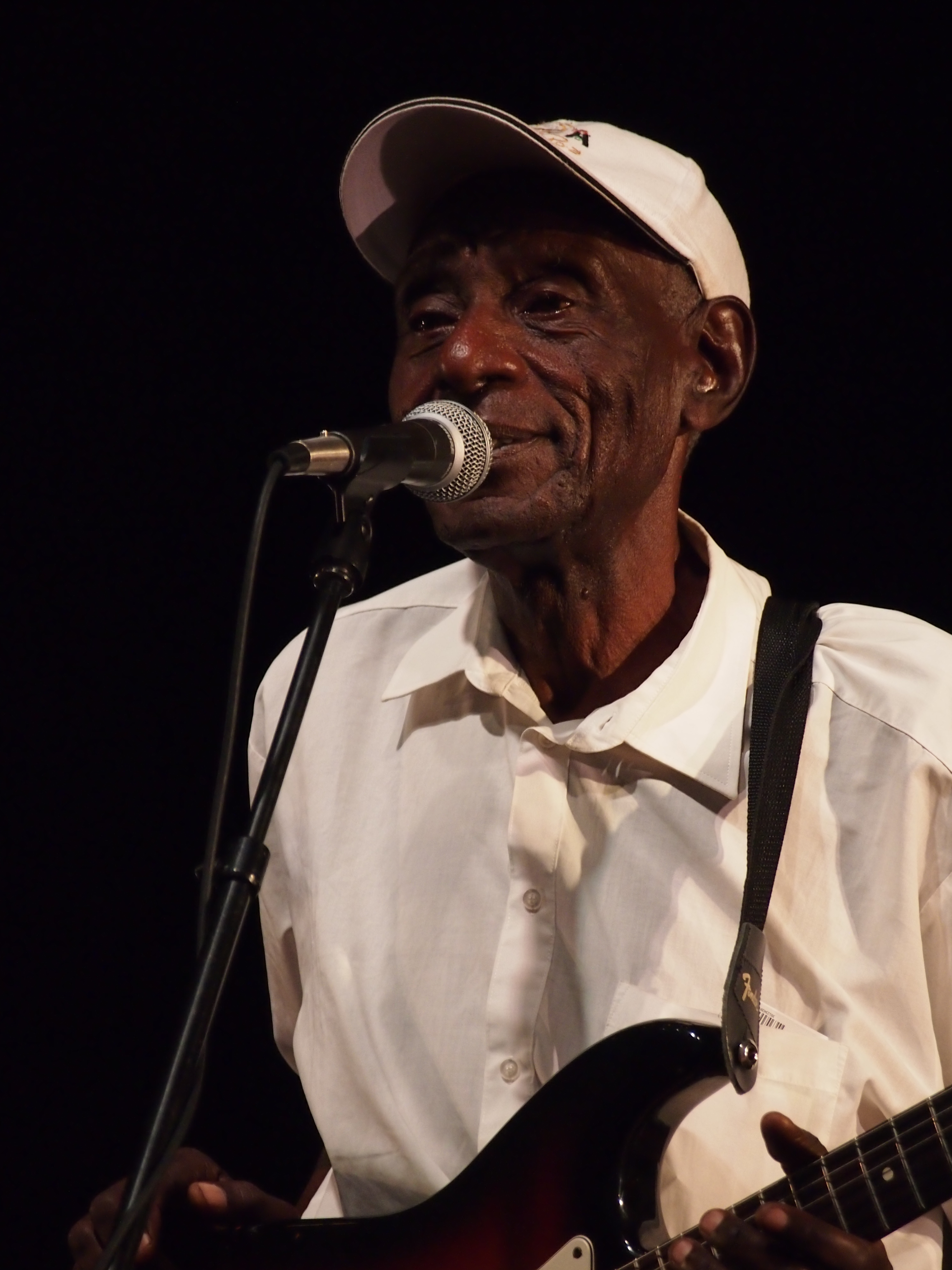

Background information
- Birth name: John Amutabi Nzenze
- Born: 1940; Muthurwa, Nairobi Area, Kenya Colony
- Origin: Kakamega, Kenya
- Died: May 30, 2020 (aged 79–80); Kakamega, Kenya
- Occupation: Musician
- Instrument: Guitar
- Labels: Jambo Records

John Nzenze (1940 – 30 May 2020) was a musician from Kenya. He had performed the twist dance style. Some of his most popular songs were "Angelike" (released in 1961), "Julieta Rudi Tuone" and "Habari za Nairobi (Nairobi twist)".

== Life ==
He was from the Luhya tribe in the western region part of Kenya. Nzenze went to St Peter's primary school. He started playing with his father's guitar at the age of 12, but after learning how much time he spent playing it, his father sold the guitar. After finishing the school, he worked at the Norfolk Hotel in Nairobi. At the time he teamed up with Daudi Kabaka, with whom he recorded three songs - "Safari Tanganyika", "Bachelor Boy" and "Nyumba za Tobacco". These songs were released by Jambo Records and became hits.

He toured Japan, Britain and various East African countries. In 1968 he represented Kenya at All African Music Festival in Algeria, finishing third. As a result, president Jomo Kenyatta feted him and his Air Fiesta Matata band, and Emperor Haile Selassie invited him to perform in Ethiopia. Next year the band performed with Miles Davis in Germany, who was impressed with the band and arranged for them a tour of America. In 1971, BBC World Service gave them a Best Band in Africa award Nzenze left his group in 1972, after which he went to perform regularly to tourists at the Panafric Hotel and later played at tourist ships. As of 2009, he had performed at the Westlife Club in Kakamega, and was still making music at the time of his death. He has also served as a board member of the Music Copyright Society of Kenya.

In 2009 he was among four pioneering Kenyan showbiz people given Head of State Commendation awards by president Mwai Kibaki. Others were John Katana (band leader Them Mushrooms), David Ndung'u and Conrad Karukenya (aka Tiger Power).

Nzenze died on 30 May 2020, a month after undergoing stomach surgery.
