= Teddy Robin =

Hong Kong-English pop singer-songwriter

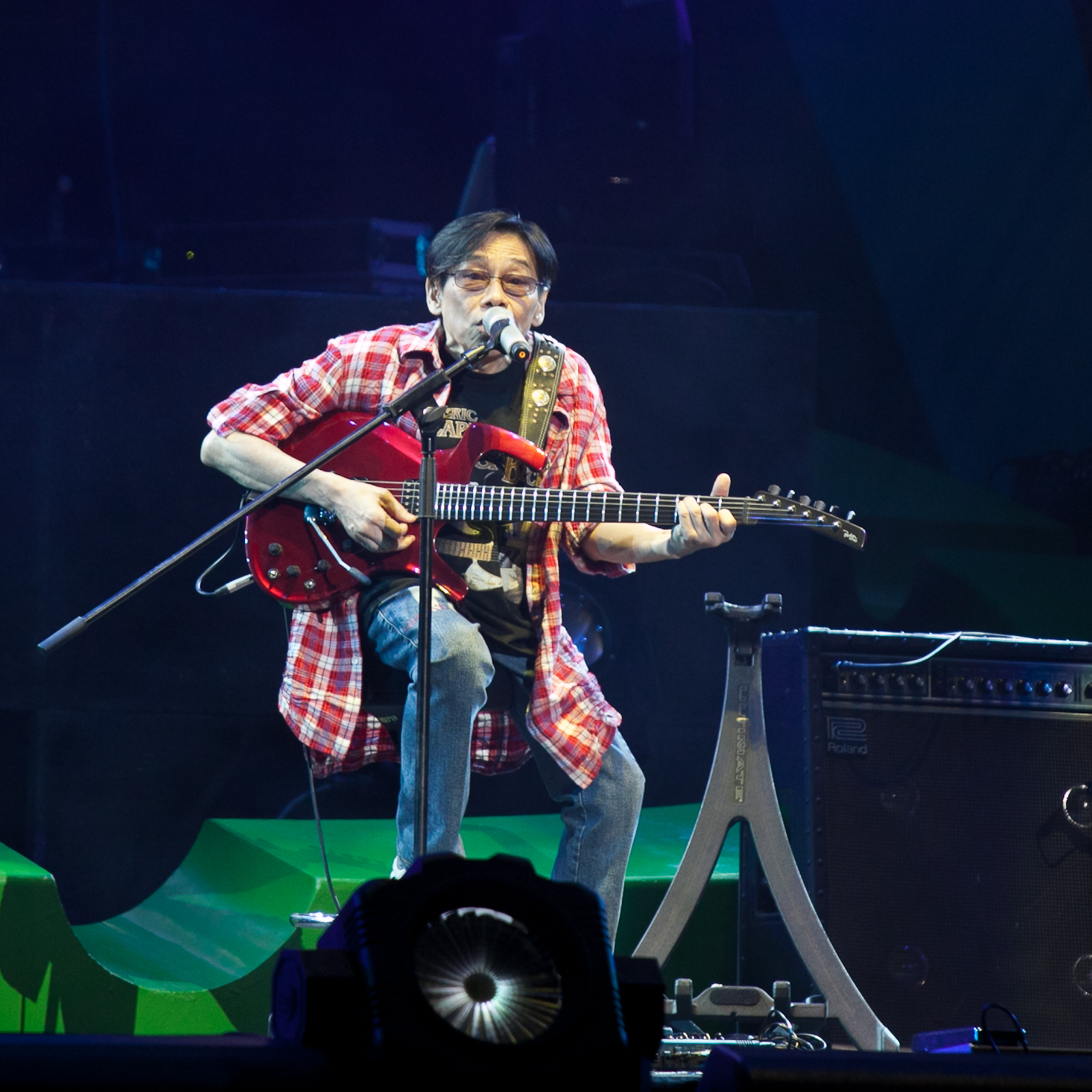
- Robin in 2010
- Born: Kwan Wai-pang (關維鵬); 20 March 1945 (age 81); Guilin, Guangxi
- Occupations: Musician; singer-songwriter; record producer; film actor
- Years active: 1960s–present
- Relatives: Kelvin Kwan (Nephew)
- Awards: Hong Kong Film Awards – Best Supporting Actor; 2011 Gallants; Best Original Score; 2011 Gallants Hong Kong Film Critics Society Awards – Best Actor; 2010 Gallants

Chinese name
- Traditional Chinese: 泰迪羅賓
- Simplified Chinese: 泰迪罗宾
Transcriptions
Standard Mandarin
- Hanyu Pinyin: tai4 di2 luo2 bin1
Yue: Cantonese
- Jyutping: taai3 dik6 lo4 ban1
- Musical career
- Genres: Hong Kong English pop
- Instruments: Vocals, guitar, piano

Kwan Wai Pang (Chinese: 關維鵬; born 20 March 1945 in Guilin, Guangxi), known professionally as Teddy Robin (Chinese: 泰迪羅賓), is a Hong Kong English pop singer-songwriter, actor, and director and producer. He began his music career in mid 1960s when Hong Kong English pop was at its peak. He formed a rock and roll band with his friends called Teddy Robin and the Playboys while Teddy was the vocal and guitarist. The band was the first Chinese-led rock band in Hong Kong. The band became a massive hit in Hong Kong.

From the 70s, Teddy started to get involved in the film industry. In 1979, he was the producer of his first film Cops and Robbers (點指兵兵). He then played a pivotal role at the Pearl City Production Company and Cinema City Company Limited. Despite his heavy involvement in film productions, he was still passionate about music and continued his involvement in record productions and film song creation during the time.

He has produced over 20 films and directed 5 and 1/3 films throughout his career. He won various awards across film and music festivals, such as the CASH Hall of Fame Award from the Composers and Authors Society of Hong Kong, The Best Original Film Song and the Best Supporting Actor from the Hong Kong Film Award, The Best Actor from Hong Kong Film Critics Society and The Best Actor from International Chinese Film Festival. He is also one of the five founders of Hong Kong Film Directors' Guild and the Honorary Director of Hong Kong Performing Artistes Guild.

== Early life ==
Teddy Robin was born in Guilin, Guangxi, alongside five brothers and sisters. (Note: Material on the source of the name "Teddy Robin", family background, and early life comes from an interview broadcast on 23 February 2015, on the RTHK program "守下留情".) He came to Hong Kong with his father in 1949, settling in Wan Chai.

As a child, Robin was both a rebellious boy and an average student. He often spent his time at street court with his gangs. He called himself "Teddy Robin" because he admired the heroic image of Robin Hood.

At the early age of 11, Robin started his career as a child broadcaster at Rediffusion (ATV).

Robin developed his enthusiasm for rock and roll music when he first heard the sound of an electric guitar. Then he started to explore and learn to play electric guitar. He then formed a rock band called "Teddy Robin and the Playboys" with his friends and his two younger brothers.

Apart from music, Robin is also a skilled painter and sketcher. He designed the cover for his singles, including "I Can’t Be Hurt Any More", "Not All Lies", "Breakthrough", "365 Days" and "Memories".

== Media career ==
=== Music career ===
After graduating from high school, Robin worked as a Trainee Producer at Rediffusion English TV Station. (Note: 關於泰迪羅賓任職見習編導、跳槽至無綫電視、移民加拿大、重回香港發展的資料出自香港電台第二台廣播節目《守下留情》於2015年2月24日播出的訪問。) He formed rock band Teddy Robin and the Playboys with Norman Chang, Fedrick Chan and his two younger brothers in 1966.

In the 1960s, the band was signed by Diamond Records and released its first album. In 1966, "Teddy Robin and the Playboys" was the home band of Rediffusion TV's most popular music program "Soundbite 66".

In 1968, Chung King-fai invited Robin to move from Rediffusion TV to TVB under the terms set by Robin – to not only perform on the stage but also work behind the scene. He acted in his first film The Cost of Love for Shaw Brothers Studio in 1969. Robin returned to Rediffusion TV in 1973 to host a youth show called Melody Chain.

While in 1974, Robin realized rock and roll music started to diminish in Hong Kong, so he wandered to the United States and Canada until 1978.

=== Film career ===
In the 1980s, Teddy Robin joined Cinema City and Films Co. and was part of the seven core members of Cinema City (including Karl Maka, Dean Shek, Raymond Wong, Shi, Eric Tsang, and Tsui Hark) who would gather nightly at Maka's house, located at Mei Foo Sun Chuen, to produce ideas and scripts for the company.

== Award and recognition ==
- 2011 – Gallants – The Best Supporting Actor, the Hong Kong Film Award
- 2011 – Gallants – The Best Original Film Song, the Hong Kong Film Award
- 2011 – Gallants – The Best Actor, Hong Kong Film Critics Society
- 2011 – CASH Hall of Fame Award, Composers and Authors Society of Hong Kong
- 2012 – Merry Go Round – The Best Actor, International Chinese Film Festival
- 2017 – Lifetime Achievement Award, Asian Popup Cinema Festival

== Personal life ==
Robin is married and has one son and one daughter. His son works at Morgan Stanley in London as an Executive Director and his daughter is a sugar artist in Canada.

== Filmography ==
=== As actor ===
Year	Title	Role	Awards
2019	A Lifetime Treasure		
2013	Tales from the Dark 2		
2013	Doomsday Party		
2011	ICAC Investigators 2011		
2010	Merry-Go-Round		
2010	Gallants	Ben Law	Won – Hong Kong Film Critics Society Awards for Best Actor; Won – Hong Kong Film Award for Best Supporting Actor
2010	Detective Dee and the Mystery of the Phantom Flame	Wang Lu (after face-lift)	
1995	Hong Kong Graffiti	Johnny K	
1993	Temptation of a Monk		
1992	Cageman	Tong Sam	
1992	Twin Dragons	Tyson	
1991	Great Pretenders	Mr. Giant	
1991	The Banquet		
1990	To Spy with Love	Terry	
1988	The Eighth Happiness	Hsiu-Fang's Husband	
1988	Three Against the World	Cho Fei-fan	
1987	Kino Countdown	Huge Ben	
1987	Legend of the Golden Pearl		
1985	Working Class	Hing	
1985	Lifeline Express		
1985	Run Tiger Run	Teddy Shit	
1984	Banana Cop	Chiu Din-Boh/Ping Pong Ball	
1983	All the Wrong Spies	Inspector Teddy Robin	
1982	It Takes Two		
1981	All the Wrong Clues	Chief Inspector Robin	
1970	The Price of Love	Wu Yu Sheng	

=== As film director ===
Year	Title	Awards
1988	Women Prison	
1995	Hong Kong Graffiti	
1990	Shanghai, Shanghai	
1987	Legend of the Golden Pearl	
1983	All the Wrong Spies	Nominated – Hong Kong Film Award for Best Director

=== As composer ===
Year	Title	Awards
2010	Gallants	Won – Hong Kong Film Award for Best Original Score
2009	Permanent Residence	
1996	Black Mask	
1995	Great Adventurers	
1995	The Private Eye Blues	
1995	Hong Kong Graffiti	Nominated – Hong Kong Film Award for Best Original Film Song
1993	Full Contact	
1993	Miss Butterfly	
1993	Lady Super Cop	
1991	Legend of the Brothers	
1990	Shanghai, Shanghai	
1990	To Spy with Love	
1989	Bloody Brotherhood	
1988	Tiger on Beat	
1988	Three Against the World	
1988	As Tears Go By	
1987	City on Fire	Nominated – Hong Kong Film Award for Best Original Film Score; Nominated – Hong Kong Film Award for Best Original Film Song
1986	Till Death Do We Scare	Nominated – Hong Kong Film Award for Best Original Film Song
1983	Aces Go Places 2	Nominated – Hong Kong Film Award for Best Original Film Score
1983	All the Wrong Spies	Nominated – Hong Kong Film Award for Best Original Film Score
1982	Aces Go Places	
1981	Chasing Girls	
1980	The Saviour	
1970	The Price of Love	

== See also ==
- Hong Kong English pop
