= Baby: Secret of the Lost Legend =

1985 film

- Theatrical release poster
- Directed by: Bill L. Norton
- Written by: Clifford Green; Ellen Green; David Lee Miller (storybook)
- Produced by: Jonathan T. Taplin; Roger Spottiswoode
- Starring: William Katt; Sean Young; Patrick McGoohan
- Cinematography: John Alcott
- Edited by: David Bretherton; Howard Smith
- Music by: Jerry Goldsmith
- Production companies: Touchstone Films; Silver Screen Partners II
- Distributed by: Buena Vista Distribution Co.
- Release date: March 22, 1985
- Running time: 93 minutes
- Country: United States
- Languages: English; French
- Budget: $13 million
- Box office: $14.9 million

Baby: Secret of the Lost Legend is a 1985 American adventure fantasy film directed by Bill L. Norton and starring William Katt, Sean Young, Patrick McGoohan, and Julian Fellowes. The film follows paleontologist Susan Matthews-Loomis and her husband George, who stumble upon a brontosaurus on an expedition in Central Africa while trying to track down a local monster. The two are pursued by the African military in an attempt to protect a baby dino and its parents.

Produced by Walt Disney Studios and released on its Touchstone Films label, it was first released on March 22, 1985. A recut version was broadcast on American television by NBC in 1989 under the title Dinosaur...Secret of the Lost Legend as part of The Magical World of Disney.

== Plot ==
During an expedition into Central Africa, paleontologist Dr. Susan Matthews-Loomis and her husband George Loomis attempt to track down evidence of a local monster legend. The monster, which the local natives refer to as "Mokele-mbembe", shares many characteristics with the Sauropod order of dinosaurs. During the expedition, they discover brontosaurus in the deep jungle and are further amazed when the animals show very little fear of them. The couple begins observing the creatures and become especially enamored with the curious young offspring of the pair, whom they nickname "Baby". Unfortunately, the discovery soon places the dinosaurs in jeopardy from both the local military as well as fellow scientist Dr. Eric Kiviat.

Whereas Dr. Kiviat sees Baby and his parents as his ticket to fame and fortune, the African military led by Colonel Nsogbu sees the dinosaurs as a threat and makes several attempts to destroy them. During one such attempt, the adult male brontosaurus is killed and the adult female captured. The Loomises are able to escape with Baby, but quickly find themselves lost in the jungle while being pursued by Colonel Nsogbu's forces. After finally escaping their pursuers, the pair decide to circle back and rescue the female adult brontosaurus, whom Dr. Kiviat has persuaded Colonel Nsogbu to transport back to civilization.

With the aid of the local tribe – who see Baby and his parents as legends – George and Susan are able to break into the military compound and release the mother brontosaurus. During the escape, both Kiviat and Nsogbu are killed. Afterwards, the Loomises take the pair to a secluded jungle lagoon and say a tearful goodbye to Baby as he follows his mother away into the deeper parts of the jungle.

== Cast ==
- William Katt as George Loomis
- Sean Young as Dr. Susan Matthews-Loomis
- Patrick McGoohan as Dr. Eric Kiviat
- Julian Fellowes as Nigel Jenkins
- Kyalo Mativo as Cephu
- Hugh Quarshie as Kenge Obe
- Olu Jacobs as Col. Nsogbu
- Eddie Tagoe as Sgt. Gwambe
- Edward Hardwicke as Dr. Pierre Dubois

== Soundtrack ==
Baby: Secret of the Lost Legend

Film score by Jerry Goldsmith
- Released: April 8, 2008
- Recorded: 1985
- Genre: Soundtrack
- Length: 53:08

The score to Baby: Secret of the Lost Legend, a hybrid of orchestral and synthetic elements, was composed and conducted by veteran composer Jerry Goldsmith. Goldsmith recalled the experience with such fondness that he insisted it be included in an industry tribute album featuring highlights from his scores in 1993. A limited extended soundtrack was released 8 April 2008 through Intrada Records and features sixteen tracks of score at a running time just over fifty-three minutes.

1. "The Sketch" (0:44)
2. "No Problem" (0:44)
3. "The Visitors" (2:27)
4. "New Friends #1" (1:17)
5. "New Friends #2" (0:33)
6. "The Family" (4:04)
7. "Dad" (7:10)
8. "Tears" (1:25)
9. "The Tent" (2:53)
10. "Dragon Breath" (6:48)
11. "The Search" (3:09)
12. "The Jump" (4:31)
13. "The Captives" (2:01)
14. "Base Camp Assault" (4:15)
15. "The Rescue" (3:37)
16. "Just a Legend" (7:31)

== Reception ==
Colin Greenland reviewed Baby: Secret of the Lost Legend for Imagine magazine, and stated that "proves that the Walt Disney formula can even make a brontosaurus cute."

Baby: Secret of the Lost Legend received generally negative reviews. The film holds a 12% rating on review aggregation website Rotten Tomatoes based on 17 reviews.

== See also ==
- List of films featuring dinosaurs
