= Eddie Tagoe =

Ghanaian actor

- Born: Eddie Nii Afutu Tagoe
- Education: Royal Academy of Dramatic Art
- Occupations: Actor; musician; reflexologist
- Years active: 1971–1996
- Notable work: Top Secret! Who Is Killing the Great Chefs of Europe?

Eddie Tagoe is a Ghanaian actor, musician and reflexologist, based in the United Kingdom.

== Early life ==
Eddie Tagoe was born Eddie Nii Afutu Tagoe to Chief Asafoatshe Ayah Tagoe.

Tagoe travelled to London to study reflexology prior to pursuing acting. He then received a grant from the government of Ghana to study at the Royal Academy of Dramatic Art in London.

== Acting ==
Tagoe is best-remembered for minor supporting roles in two film classics: As the hippie "Presuming Ed" in the 1987 film production of Withnail and I, a role that he resumed in 2000 in a stage production of the same work; and as one of the pirates in the 1981 movie Raiders of the Lost Ark.

Tagoe had a significantly larger part in his film debut, Who Is Killing the Great Chefs of Europe? (1978), and as "Chocolate Mousse" in the 1984 farce, Top Secret!. He appeared in various other roles such as Sgt. Gwambe in Baby: Secret of the Lost Legend (1985), as well as The Dogs of War (1980), Pink Floyd The Wall (1982) and Spaghetti House (1982). Tagoe also appeared in episodes of a number of British television series, including Legacy of Murder, Prospects, and The Bill, becoming "a well-known face on British television as an actor".

Tageo played the tumba, conga, maracas and the bongos on the 1972–1973 single "I Feel Funky" by Matata.

== Reflexology ==
In 1995, he returned to his original career choice when he was recruited to serve as team reflexologist for Newcastle United F.C.

== Filmography ==
=== Film ===
Year	Title	Role	Notes	Ref(s)
1977	Black Joy	African Dustman		
1978	Who Is Killing the Great Chefs of Europe?	Mumbala		
1979	Arabian Adventure	Nubian		
1980	The Dogs of War	Jinja		
1980	The Boy Who Never Was	Ngalo	Made by the Children's Film Foundation	
1981	Raiders of the Lost Ark	Messenger Pirate		
1982	Pink Floyd The Wall	Minder		
1982	Spaghetti House	Bill		
1984	Top Secret!	Chocolate Mousse, Resistance Member		
1985	Baby: Secret of the Lost Legend	Sergeant Gambwe		
1987	Withnail and I	Presuming Ed		
1991	Ama	Brother Josh	Last film role	

=== Television ===
Year	Title	Role	Notes	Ref(s)
1973	Full House	Performer in Black Blast!	Season 1, Episode 13. Play by Lindsay Barrett.	
1996	The Bill: Target	Mr. Henry	Crime / Drama	

=== Stage ===
Year	Title	Role	Venue	Notes	Ref(s)
1971–1973	Show Boat	Charlie, The Chorus	Adelphi Theatre		
1972	Oluwale	Horace Hames	Brighton Festival	Play by Jeremy Sandford. Also performed and broadcast on BBC Radio Brighton.	
1979	King Kong	King Kong	His Majesty’s Theatre, Johannesburg	Lead role	
