= Solomon Grundy (song) =

1969 song by The Foundations

"Solomon Grundy" is a song written by Eric Allandale, a member of the English multi-racial group The Foundations. The song is loosely based on "Solomon Grundy", the 19th-century children's nursery rhyme. It appeared on their 1969 Digging The Foundations album that featured the hit single "In the Bad Bad Old Days (Before You Loved Me)", and it was the B side of their minor American hit single "My Little Chickadee". The singer pronounces it "Solomon Grandy" throughout the song, even though it foils the rhyme. It was also released as a single by Hong Kong beat group Danny Diaz & The Checkmates and it was the song that first brought Polly Brown & Pickettywitch to notice when they appeared on ITV's Opportunity Knocks television talent show. It was also the B side of Pickettywitch's 1969 debut single "You Got Me So I Don't Know".

== Single releases ==
- The Foundations - "My Little Chickadee" / "Solomon Grundy" - UNI 55137 - 1969 (USA) & PYE 4002 - 1970 (Canada)
- Danny Diaz & The Checkmates - "Solomon Grundy" / "Goodbye Baby" PYE 7N 17690 - 1969 (UK)
- Pickettywitch - "You've Got Me So I Don't Know" / "Solomon Grundy" PYE 7N 17799 (UK)

== Compilation ==
- The Foundations, Baby, Now That I've Found You - Sequel Records - NEECD 300 - 1999
- The Foundations, Build Me Up Buttercup (The Complete Pye Collection) [Remastered] - Castle - 2004
- Pickettywitch, That Same Old Feeling / The complete Recordings UK : 2001 Sanctuary CMRCD 265 (CD)
- Pickettywitch / Pickettywitch + 13 Japan : 2001 Victor VICP-61439 (CD)
- (Various Artists), Round The Gum Tree - The British Bubblegum Explosion! - Danny Diaz & The Checkmates - Castle Music - CMRCD 906 - 2004 (UK)
