= We Are Happy People =

Single by Slam Creepers
- A-side: "We Are Happy People"
- B-side: "I Just Couldn't Get You Out of My Mind"
- Released: 1968
- Genre: pop
- Label: Bill Records Bill BT 128 (Sweden)
- Songwriter(s): Eric Allandale

Slam Creepers singles chronology
"Mr Personality Man" (1968)	"We Are Happy People" (1968)	"Ha Ha Ha" (1968)

"We Are Happy People" was a top 5 hit in Scandinavia for Swedish group Slam Creepers’ also known as The Slams It was written by trombonist Eric Allandale and made its first appearance as the B-side of The Foundations third single, the minor hit and Tony Macaulay and John Macleod composition "Any Old Time You're Lonely Or Sad". It was re-recorded by the Foundations in 1968, this time with Colin Young on vocals and appeared on their 1968 LP released on Marble Arch MALS 1157. By April 1969 it had been recorded by nine different artists.

== Singles released ==
- The Foundations - "Any Old Time You're Lonely or Sad" / "We Are Happy People" - PYE 7N 17503 - 1968 - (UK)
- The Foundations - "Any Old Time (You're Lonely and Sad)" / "We Are Happy People" - Uni 55073 -1968 - (US)
- Slam Creepers’ - "We Are Happy People" / "I Just Couldn't Get You Out Of My Mind" - Bill BT 128 - 1968 - (Sweden)
- Slam Creepers’ - "We Are Happy People" / "I Just Couldn't Get You Out Of My Mind" - Olga/Exit 2.520-B (Spain)
- Slam Creepers’ - "We Are Happy People" / "Vansbro Memories" - Sonet SON 2003 - (UK)
- Slam's - "We Are Happy People" / "Hold It Baby" - Exit 2.609-B - (Spain)

- The Pacific Showband - "Remains To Be Seen" / "We Are Happy People" - Tribune TRS 125 - 1969 - (UK)
