= Giulio Paradisi =

Italian film director, actor and screenwriter

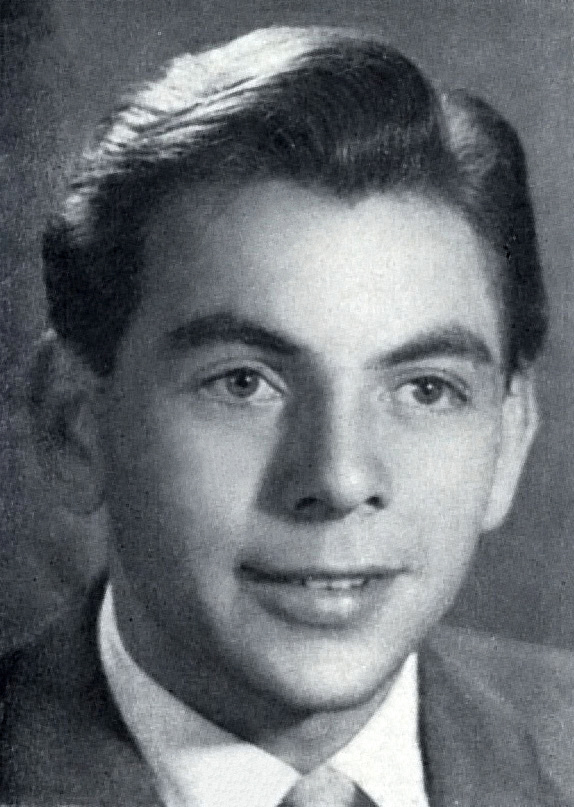
- Paradisi in 1953
- Born: 21 March 1934 (age 92); Rome
- Occupations: Film director, screenwriter

Giulio Paradisi (born 21 March 1934) is an Italian film director, actor and screenwriter.

== Life and career ==
Born in Rome, Paradisi enrolled the Centro Sperimentale di Cinematografia and immediately after the graduation he made his acting debut with a small role in Alessandro Blasetti's Too Bad She's Bad.

After playing several other character roles with notable directors including Federico Fellini and Francesco Maselli, he began working as an assistant director in 1963, later directing a few fairly successful films on his own between 1970 and 1982. Paradisi was also active as a stage director and as a director of commercials.

== Filmography ==
=== Director ===
- Terzo Canale - Avventura a Montecarlo (1970)
- Ragazzo di borgata (1976)
- The Visitor (1979)
- Tesoromio (1979)
- Spaghetti House (1982)
