= Danny Diaz & the Checkmates =

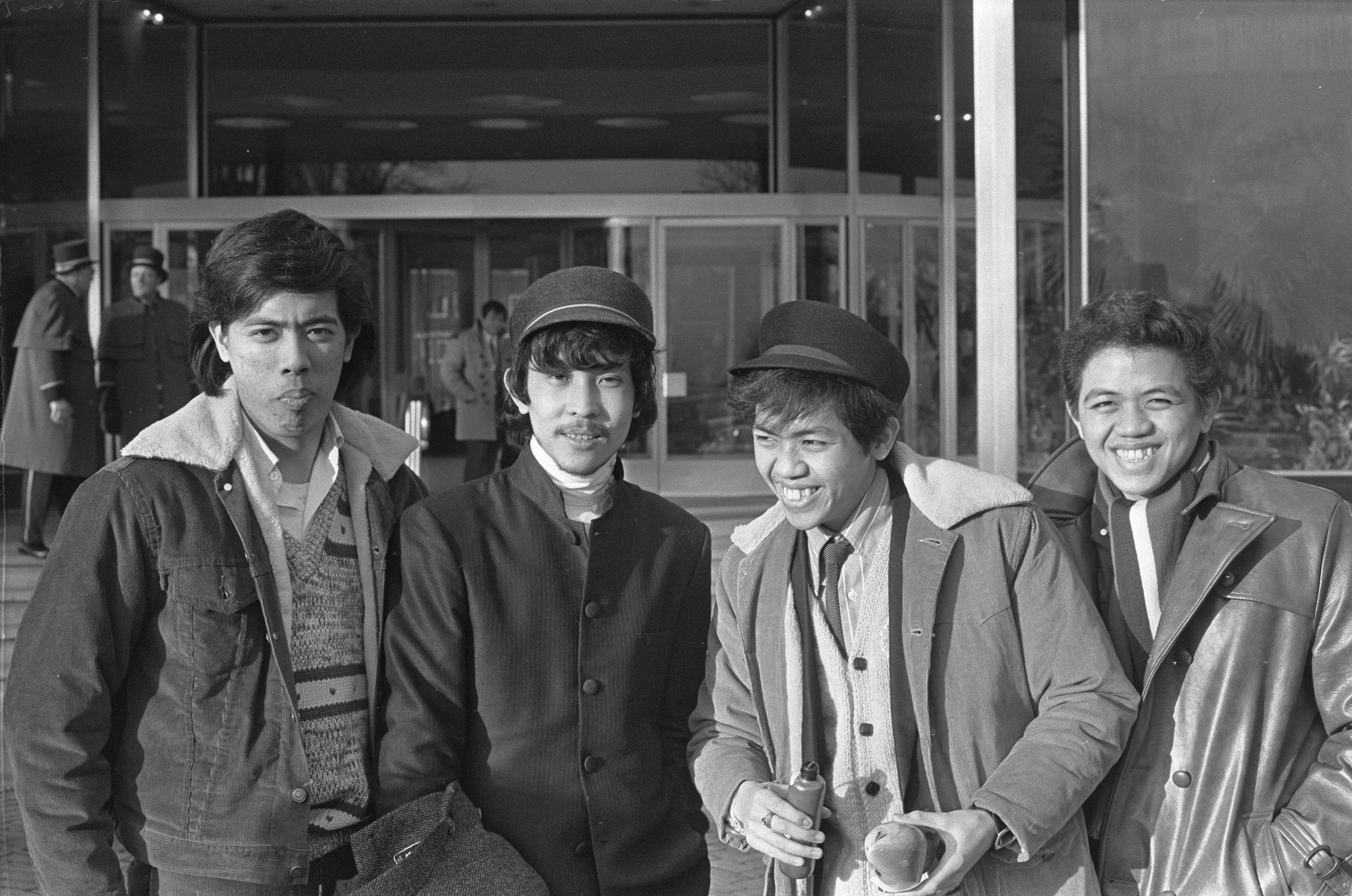
Danny Diaz & the Checkmates in Amsterdam in 1969

Danny Diaz & the Checkmates were a Filipino rock band, based in Hong Kong in the 1960s.

== Background ==
They were part of the Hong Kong beat group scene between 1964 and 1969, that included other Hong Kong groups, such as Anders Nelson & the Inspiration, D'Topnotes, Fabulous Echoes, Joe Jr. & the Side Effects, Teddy Robin & the Playboys, Lotus, Magic Carpets, Mod East and Mystics and the Thunderbirds. They entered into a "Battle of the Sound" contest and conquered various groups, and in the final beat Teddy Robin & the Playboys to become the winner. Some recordings were released on the Diamond label. In the late 1960s, they covered a song that the Foundations had released, the Eric Allandale composition "Solomon Grundy".

== Career ==
=== 1960s ===
In 1964, Danny Diaz and the Checkmates released the single "Wonderful World" backed with "Stand by Me" on Diamond. Interestingly on the single, the A-side was credited to Barbara Campbell. The song was originally composed by Lou Alder and Herb Alpert with additional input from Sam Cooke. On the week ending December 12, 1964, the single entered the Hong Kong top ten at No. 8. On the week ending December 26, it was at No. 6. On the week ending January 2, 1965 it reached its peak position of No. 3. It stayed in the charts until the week ending January 23.

In 1966, the group released "It's So Easy" b/w "She's So Fine" on Diamond. It was also released in Australia on the Stateside label.

In 1969, they recorded the song "Solomon Grundy" backed with "Goodbye Baby" which was released in the UK on Pye. Having won the "Battle of the Bands" competition, which was organized by Levi Strauss, and a $10,000 recording contract with Trend Records, they were pictured in the February 8 issue of Record Mirror with composer Eric Allandale and two other Foundations members, Alan Warner and Tony Gomez. The Foundations were hosting the group who were in London for the single's launch, and Foundations manager Barry Class had arranged for them to visit the UK.

=== 1970s to 1990s ===
In the 1970s, Danny Diaz formed the Danny Diaz trio with his brothers Rudy and Romeo.

Around the mid-1970s, Danny Diaz moved to Canada.

== Discography ==
=== Singles ===
- "Solomon Grundy" / "Goodbye Baby", Pye
- "What Ever Happened to Romance", Jewel

=== Compilation appearances ===
- Diamond Records Best Selection - "It's So Easy" and "Up Up and Away" (four-CD compilation) (2006), Universal Music (HK)
- Krazy World World Beaters 4 - "She's So Fine" (2005)
