= For My Woman =

1965 song by the Easybeats

- Australian record label

Single by the Easybeats
- B-side: "Say That You're Mine"
- Released: 18 March 1965
- Recorded: January 1965
- Venue: 2UW Theatre, Sydney
- Genre: Rhythm and blues
- Length: 3:04
- Label: Albert; Parlophone
- Songwriters: Stevie Wright; George Young
- Producer: Ted Albert

The Easybeats Australian singles chronology
"For My Woman" (1965)	"She's So Fine" (1965)

Audio
- "For My Woman" on YouTube

"For My Woman" is a song by the Australian rock band the Easybeats, written by singer Stevie Wright and guitarist George Young. The Easybeats had formed in Sydney in 1964, with a sound inspired by the Pretty Things and the Rolling Stones. After signing with their manager Mike Vaughan, he introduced the band to producer and businessman Ted Albert, who liked them enough to sign with his company Albert Productions in December 1964. The song was recorded in January 1965 at the 2UW Theatre in Sydney as a demo together with three other songs.

Musically, "For My Woman" is centered in rhythm and blues and is structurally a relatively simple song, heavily revolving around two repeating chords. Vocally, Wright was inspired by vocalist Phil May while the lyrics tell the tale of a man who yearns for a woman. Albert managed to get the song distributed by Parlophone in Australia, who released the single on 18 March 1965, backed by "Say That You're Mine". Being their debut single, it only reached number 33 in the Kent Music Report. Retrospectively, the song has received primarily positive reviews, with a focus on Wright's vocal performance.

== Background and recording ==
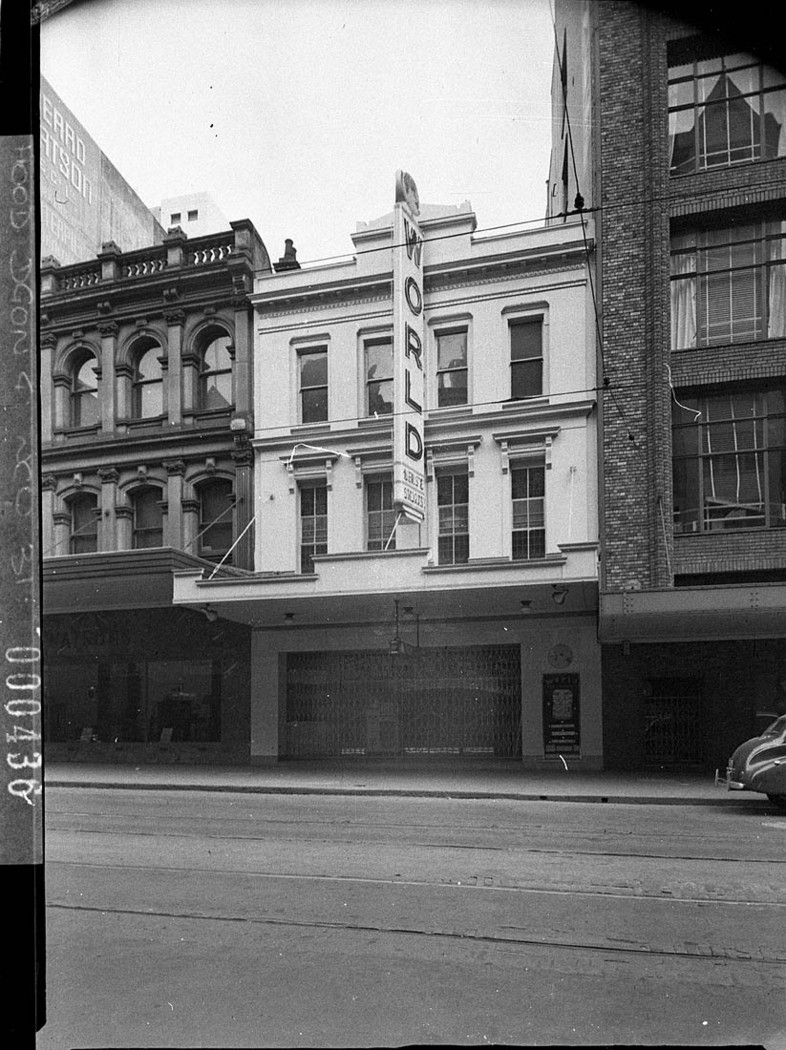
"For My Woman" was recorded at the 2UW Theatre in Sydney.

The Easybeats had formed in Sydney, Australia in 1964, by five immigrant men, settling on a line-up consisting of Englishmen Stevie Wright (lead vocals) and Snowy Fleet (drums), Scottish George Young (rhythm guitar) alongside Dutchmen Harry Vanda (lead guitar) and Dick Diamonde (bass guitar). Although they had formed at the height of Beatlemania in Australia, the Easybeats were never particularly influenced by the Beatles, and according to Vanda "were captivated by the music of the Pretty Things and the Rolling Stones", hastily taking on a rhythm and blues-approach to their music. Music critic David-Hughes Owens stated that their influence from the Beatles "ended with their boyish charm", and instead stated that they took an approach which was more similar to the Kinks in "raw performance and delivery".

While performing at a club called Beatle Village in Darlinghurst, Sydney, the band were discovered by manager Mike Vaughan, who quickly garnered an interest for the fledging group. On 11 December 1964, the Easybeats signed Vaughan as their manager, after which he promptly introduced them to Ted Albert, an acquaintance of his. Albert, who ran record label and publishing company Albert Productions was similarly impressed with the band, particularly the songwriting talents of Young. The Easybeats were signed onto Albert Productions, after which Albert managed to negotiate future distribution for the band's records on Parlophone, something they were reportedly overjoyed with, since "it was the Beatles record label".

In January 1965, the Easybeats entered the 2UW Theatre in Sydney, where Albert had set up a makeshift recording studio, utilizing a two-track tape recorder. Albert, keen on not missing out any potentially commercial compositions by the band, wanted the Easybeats to record a "demo of every song they knew". In the end, the demo session produced three original Wright and Young composition and one cover, respectively; "Say That You're Mine", "The Bells" and "For My Woman", along with a cover of Ben E. King's "I (Who Have Nothing)" (1963). On these tracks, the Easybeats performed on their respective instruments, with Wright playing percussion on the recordings, something that "got the rest of the band so sick of them [maracas]" that they "threatened to smash their instruments".

== Composition ==
As with most other compositions by the Easybeats at the time, "For My Woman" was penned by Wright and Young, with the former primarily contributing lyrics while the latter largely was behind the composition. Wright and Young were an "efficient and productive" songwriting duo, primarily composing at the piano in Young's childhood home in Burwood, Sydney, utilizing most of their free time writing songs. Before the band had even signed with Albert, Wright and Young had already composed roughly 20 songs. Allegedly, the song was the first that the duo had written, being composed during the autumn of 1964 and later introduced on stage during a performance at Beatle Village. According to author John Tait, the Easybeats ranked among "the only bands to exclusively perform original material" in Australia, together with pop trio the Bee Gees. Though the B-side "Say That You're Mine" boasts clear influences by British merseybeat, "For My Woman" was largely composed in a style reflecting the Pretty Things, particularly their hit single "Don't Bring Me Down" (1964). Wright's vocal delivery largely derives from their lead singer Phil May.

As recorded by the Easybeats, "For My Woman" was performed in B-flat minor at a tempo of 107 beats per minute. The song is largely driven by a three note guitar riff by Vanda, that primarily consists of the two notes of F and D, something that prevails throughout most of the composition. However, as the chorus of the song repeats, the note of D modulates to G, something that is repeated for one measure before once again dropping to D. During the post-chorus, Young and Vanda strum the seventh A chord in unison, before the composition enters the instrumental break, largely supplied by Vanda's guitar solo. Structurally, the song does not feature any verses, instead only consisting of three refrains and three bridges with the exception of slight ad-libbing by Wright right before the guitar solo. Lyrically, the song is about a man's love for a woman, who the narrator "yearns for in marriage", since he wants "her for my woman".

== Release and reception ==
For the Easybeats debut single, Albert had initially planned to release their version of "I (Who Have Nothing)" as the A-side, figuring that a cover version would establish the then unknown band better than an original composition would. However, rumours started spreading that pop singer Normie Rowe planned to record the single as a follow-up to his top-10 hit "It Ain't Necessarily So" on the Sunshine Records label. Fearing that Rowe's version would outperform the Easybeats rendition as he was an established artist, Albert instead opted to issue "For My Woman" as their first single. On 18 March 1965, it was issued through Australian Parlophone backed by "Say That You're Mine", which had been recorded during the same session. Jeff Apter states that the release was genial "chart wise" for the band to release an "original rhythm and blues composition", given that bands such as the Animals were popular. Allegedly, the band themselves had to promote the single by delivering copies to radio stations across Sydney, since Parlophone was reluctant to market it.

Radio reaction was predictably disinterest, reflecting a reluctance to support any local artists other than those who wore baggy suits and grinned on Bandstand each week.

— Glenn A. Baker (1980)

At the time of the single's release, Australia did not have a unified national record chart and instead, every major Australian city had their own chart, which meant that airplay of the single was never concentrated across the whole country at the same time. Having found some degree of fame in Sydney, it managed to enter the city's chart on 16 April 1965, peaking at number 46 during a tenure of only four weeks. However, after the follow-up single "She's So Fine" (1965) had become a top-10 hit in most cities, radio stations began playing "For My Woman" since fans requested the Easybeats' material; this meant that it once again began picking up airplay. The song fared particularly well on the Melbourne charts, reaching number five during a 16 week tenure. Music historian David Kent has retrospectively estimated a national Australian chart position of number 33.

"For My Woman", along with the B-side "Say That You're Mine", was excluded from the Easybeats' debut album Easy (1965), despite the fact that it only featured one of their singles "She's So Fine". Apter suggests that the album would have sold better if "For My Woman" had been included on it, since it had been a hit in Melbourne. The song's first album appearance came on the Easybeat's first compilation album The Best of The Easybeats + Pretty Girl which reached number three in Australia during the summer of 1967. On the album, it is sequenced as the opening track. Both sides of the single were featured on the Easybeats' career retrospective Absolute Anthology 1965 to 1969, sequenced as the first and second track on the album. Finally, both sides were also featured on the 1992 CD re-issue of Easy.

According to author Mick Wall, "For My Woman" is a "mid-paced" blues song with clear inspiration from the Rolling Stones, heavily revolving around "George [Young]'s skin-tight rhythm guitar" and a "proto-psychedelic solo" by Vanda. Bruce Eder of AllMusic stated that the song is an "ominous garage punk bolero", noting Wright's singing as "an agonized lament" while praising the lead guitar by Vanda. According to Bernad Zuel of The Sydney Morning Herald, "For My Woman" ranked amongst the best songs by Wright following his passing in 2015, stating that it is a "taut, dramatic and intense vocal".

== Charts ==
Chart performance for "For My Woman"
Chart (1965)	Peak position
Australia (Kent Music Report)	33
