= Three Against the World =

1988 Hong Kong film by Brandy Yuen

- Film poster
- Traditional Chinese: 群龍奪寶
- Simplified Chinese: 群龙夺宝
- Hanyu Pinyin: Qún Lóng Duó Bǎo
- Jyutping: Kwan4 Lung4 Dyut6 Bou2
- Directed by: Brandy Yuen
- Screenplay by: Sam Chim-leung; Szeto Cheuk-hon
- Produced by: Anthony Chow; Leonard Ho
- Starring: Andy Lau; Teddy Robin; Norman Chui; Rosamund Kwan; Charlene Tse; Sandy Lam
- Cinematography: Peter Ngo
- Edited by: Keung Chuen-tak; Peter Cheung
- Music by: Teddy Robin
- Production company: Bo Ho Film Company
- Distributed by: Golden Harvest
- Release date: 22 September 1988
- Running time: 85 minutes
- Country: Hong Kong
- Language: Cantonese
- Box office: HK$8,926,502

Three Against the World is a 1988 Hong Kong action film directed by Brandy Yuen and starring Andy Lau as a bounty hunter entrusted by his godfather to protect the priceless Koran and outwit a master thief (Teddy Robin) and friendly rival (Norman Chui) who are looking to pinch the scroll.

== Plot ==
Bounty hunter Charlie Chan (Andy Lau) is entrusted by his godfather, Boss Ng (Cheng Gwan-min), to protect a priceless copy of the Koran while transporting it for display in an exhibit to save his godfather's insurance company when the latter agreed to protect it for unscrupulous businessman, Sung Kam-wing (Wong Chi-keung), who is actually scheming to consume Ng's insurance company by hiring master thief Cheuk Fei-fan (Teddy Robin) to steal the Koran. On the other hand, Charlie's friendly rival, sharp shooter Ma Wan-lung (Norman Chui) also wants to steal the Koran for his girlfriend (Charlene Tse), whose grandfather had died stealing it, and her father have also gone mad for it. Charlie, Cheuk and Ma cross paths in a party hosted by Sung in his mansion and make their intentions clear before engaging in a game of show hand to determine who will have the Koran, which Cheuk wins using trickery but dissatisfies Ma, who challenge him to a Mexican stand off and hands him his revolver. Cheuk backs off and declares the match a draw, but Charlie wants to gamble with Cheuk in game of Russian roulette with Ma's revolver and fools Cheuk when Charlie shoots himself twice safely since he have emptied the revolver, knowing Ma's habit of loading only five bullets, and Cheuk leaves after Sung steps in.

The next day, Charlie splits the guards of Ng's Insurance Company into five groups to go five different directions to transport the Koran from Sung's mansion to the exhibit, with each group carrying a metal case, while Charlie keeps the Koran on himself, accompanied by a rookie guard, Siu-ming (Chin Ka-lok). Charlie stops to bathe in a bathhouse during the way and was attacked by a pair of thugs named Double Trouble (Shing Fui-On, Chiu Chi-ling) hired by Sung, but Charlie easily dispatches and kills them before arriving at the exhibit revealing he actually put the Koran in one of the cases which have all safely arrived. On the day of the exhibition show, Ma and his girlfriend arrived disguised respectively as a doctor and pregnant woman and attempts to steal the Koran when the latter pretends to be ready to give birth and the exhibit being evacuated, but was foiled when a real doctor and nurse arrive. Charlie then tells Siu-ming to follow Cheuk and his younger daughter (Sandy Lam), but does a terrible job and takes a beating but the father and daughter intentionally allow him to continue following them and he informs Charlie that Cheuk has hired gold counterfeiter Ka Yik-chan (Wu Ma) to make a fake Koran. The same night, Charlie re-encounters a beautiful woman (Rosamund Kwan) in bar (who he has previously encountered in a train) who gets drunk and stumbles into his car and he drives her back to her hotel and leaves after she sobers up and falls asleep.

Charlie then visits Ka and pays him to make another fake Koran for him, which he uses to swap to real one at exhibit while also revising the security system which allows the Koran to descend and be hidden after closing at the end of the day. That night, Ma manages to break in to exhibit and steals the fake Koran on display and Cheuk and his daughter hold Ng hostage to demanding Charlie to hand out the real Koran, which causes Ng to distrust Charlie and forces him to hand out the real Koran. Ng is later visited by the beautiful woman who claims to the Koran to return to Charlie but decides to throw it away instead as Charlie is not present. Thinking that is the real Koran, Ng swaps his with hers before she leaves and meets up with Cheuk, who turns out to be her father, which Charlie witnesses.

Right after Cheuk receives his payment from Sung in his mansion and leaves, Ma sneaks in to steal the Koran but Cheuk's elder daughter stops him and they fight for the Koran, which Charlie joins in shortly after. Sung's henchmen then appear to stop them and Charlie, Ma and Fan's daughter fight them off before continuing their fight for their Koran where the latter gets hold of it with the help of her sister while Charlie and Ma were dueling. Charlie and Ma confront Cheuk at a hotel where he was preparing to leave with his daughters and Cheuk suggests a three way Mexican duel, each using only one bullet (with Cheuk using a dagger instead of a pistol) and Cheuk pretends to get shot in order to fool Charlie and Ma into shooting each other, which was unsuccessful as the latter two figured it and Cheuk challenges them to fistfights instead. Much to Charlie and Ma's surprise, Cheuk turns out to be a highly competent fighter and unable to defeat him alone, so Charlie and Ma join forces to fight Cheuk and dispatches him. Cheuk admits defeat and leaves the Koran behind and exits with his daughters before Charlie and Ma fight against one another until Ma's girlfriend stops them informing them the Koran Cheuk left behind was fake and they attempt to chase Cheuk but is too late as he and his daughters have boarded on a train. Later, Charlie is approached by a candy selling street vendor who was entrusted by Cheuk's elder daughter to give Charlie the Koran.

== Cast ==
- Andy Lau as Charlie Chan (陳查禮), known as the Hound Hunter (獵犬), a young bounty hunter and skilled fighter who helps his godfather to save his insurance company from bankruptcy by protecting the Koran from being stolen.
- Teddy Robin as Cheuk Fei-fan (卓非凡), known as the Old Fox (老狐狸), a veteran, scheming, master thief hired by Sung Kam-wing to steal the Koran while being exhibited in order for the latter to bankrupt and consume Ng's Insurance Company.
- Norman Chui as Ma Wan-lung (馬雲龍), known as the Sharp Shooter (快鎗), an ace marksman who wants to steal the Koran for the honor his girlfriend's family.
- Rosamund Kwan as Cheuk's elder daughter who Charlie is enchanted and uses him to steal the Koran for his father, but falls in love with him later.
- Charlene Tse as Lung's girlfriend who desires the Koran to honor her grandfather and father, who have respectively died and gone mad for the Koran.
- Sandy Lam as Cheuk's younger daughter who is naughty and has great agility.
- Chin Kar-lok as Wong Siu-ming (黃小明), a rookie security guard working for Ng's Insurance Company who Charlie enlists as his assistant.
- Wu Ma as Ka Yik-chun (賈亦真), a gold counterfeiter who both Charlie and Cheuk hire to make a fake Koran.
  - Yuen Woo-ping as Ka Yik-chan in disguise when Charlie visits him.
- Wong Chi-keung as Sung Kam-wing (宋金榮), a shady rich businessman who hires Cheuk to steal the Koran he possesses in order to bankrupt and consume Ng's Insurance Company.
- Cho Tat-wah as a police detective looking for toilet in Sung's mansion.
- Shing Fui-On and Chiu Chi-ling as Double Trouble (大小不良), a pair of thugs tired by Sung's to take the Koran from Charlie but fails.
- Teddy Yip as Housekeeper Wong (黃管家) Siu-ming's father and Ng's housekeeper.
- Chung Fat as a gambler who loses in a game of show hand against Ma on a train.
- Corey Yuen as a candy selling street hawker whom Cheuk's elder daughter entrusted to give Charlie the real Koran.
- Cheng Gwan-min as Boss Ng (吳老闆), Charlie's selfish godfather who entrusts his godson when his insurance company undertakes to protect the Koran for Sung.
- Cheung Choi-mei as Ng Yuet-ying (吳月英), Ng's daughter who has a crush on Charlie.
- Sai Gwa-Pau as a guest at hotel reception making a phone call and interrupted by Siu-ming to keep his cover.
- Yuen Shun-yi as a gang leader captured by Charlie in the film's opening. (cameo)
- Brandy Yuen (cameo)
- Pauline Wong Yuk-wan as Secretary Fong (方秘書), Sung's secretary.

== Music ==
=== Theme song ===
- Enchanted (心醉)
  - Composer: Wong Sing-to
  - Lyricist: Chan Ka-kwok
  - Singer: Andy Lau

=== Insert theme ===
- True and False (真真假假)
  - Composer: Jonathan Lee
  - Lyricist: Calvin Poon
  - Singer: Andy Lau, Teddy Robin
