= Kong Ling =

1960s Hong Kong based singing star

Kong Ling 江玲
- Born: Kong Yan Lai (江欣麗) c. 1935; Hong Kong
- Genres: Jazz, Cha cha, Hong Kong English pop, Rock and roll, Pop music
- Occupation: singer
- Label: Diamond

Kong Ling (Chinese: 江玲; born c. 1935) was a 1960s Hong Kong–based singing star and recording artist who sang in various genres, including Jazz, Cha cha, Hong Kong English pop, Rock and roll and Pop music. She had also recorded with the popular Hong Kong pop group The Fabulous Echoes.

== Background ==
Kong Ling's real name is Kong Yan Lai (江欣麗). In 1951, she won an inter-school singing competition for her cover of Jo Stafford's "Congratulations" song. She started her professional career in 1954 which led to her touring Singapore for nine months. Due to the success from that she returned to Hong Kong and was in demand. In Hong Kong, she became known as the "Sweetheart of Hong Kong."

Along with the Celso Carrillo band, she recorded an album for the Diamond label. The name of the album was Hong Kong Presents ..... Off-Beat Cha Cha. The album was a Jazz / Cha Cha type of record with Carrillo playing piano, conga and cow bell on various tracks. Carrillo who was Hong Kong's leading pianist would later work on Mona Fong's album for the same label.

In 1961, she was a guest on the Arthur Godfrey show. The show that aired in May 1961 featured Kong Ling, Johnny Nash, The McGuire Sisters, Erroll Garner and Buddy Hackett. In October of that year she was in New York as part of a six-month contract to do radio and television appearances. She was contracted to the Columbia Broadcasting System. Along with Rebecca Pam she had recorded for the Diamond Music Company. Backed by the Fabulous Echoes, her version of "Al Di La" and by September 22, 1962, it had been leading on the Hong Kong best selling charts for three weeks. Prior to that her first album that she cut for the Diamond label had been a best seller in Hong Kong and the far East.

== Discography (selective) ==
- "I Love You Baby" / ? – Diamond D.76
- "Let's Twist Again" / "Why Not Now" – Diamond D 178 – (1964)
- "I've Told Every Little Star" / "Al Di La" – Diamond

=== EP ===
- Kong Ling Sings Your Favorites – Diamond DEP 001 – (1964)
- Kong Ling - Diamond DEP 005 – (1965)
- Kong Ling Vol. 3 – Diamond DEP 011

=== Album ===
- Hong Kong Presents ..... Off-Beat Cha Cha - Diamond SLP 1000

Kong Ling with The Diamond Music Co. Studio Orchestra

- Theme For A Dream – Diamond LP 1005

Kong Ling & The Fabulous Echoes

- Kong Ling & The Fabulous Echoes Vol. 2 – Diamond LP 1011
- Kong Ling & The Fabulous Echoes Vol. 2 – Diamond 1781340 – (2008) (Compact Disc)

Kong Ling + The Fabulous Echoes & Vic Christobel

- Dynamite – Diamond SLP 1008
