= Colin Young =

English singer (born 1944)

- Also known as: Colyn Young, Joe E. Young, Joey Young
- Born: 12 September 1944 (age 82)
- Origin: Barbados, West Indies
- Genres: Soul; rhythm and blues; Progressive rock; pop
- Occupation: Musician
- Years active: 1960s–present
- Labels: Pye Records, Trend Records, Ensign Records, Island Records, Ripe Music
- Formerly of: Joe E. Young & The Toniks, The Foundations, Development, The New Foundations, Mercy, Mercy

Colin Young (born 12 September 1944, Barbados) is an English singer who led Joe E. Young & The Toniks in the 1960s. He is mainly known for being a member of the British soul band the Foundations. He also led a progressive rock band and was part of a hit making dance band of the 1980s.

== Background ==
In the mid-1960s, Young came to England for a holiday with his father and decided to stay. He was a former bookkeeper who prior to joining The Foundations was lead singer of a group called Joe E. Young & The Toniks.

Young joined The Foundations at a time when two members, lead singer Clem Curtis and tenor saxophonist Mike Elliott were leaving 1968. The Foundations were originally managed by Ron Fairway and Barry Class. By the time Young came on board, Fairway was gone and Class had sole charge of the group. Replacing Clem Curtis as lead singer, he went on to sing on two more of The Foundations' big hits, "Build Me Up Buttercup" and "In the Bad Bad Old Days (Before You Loved Me)".

== Career ==
=== 1960s ===
==== The Toniks ====
In the 1960s, Young fronted the group Joe E. Young & the Toniks. He formed it with guitarist Oscar Knight, sax player Anthony Barman (aka Bauman), bass player Sam Southwell and drummer John Seally. The group was discovered when they auditioned at the All-Star club at Liverpool Street. The group would record for Vicki Wickham's Toast label. Toast was a subsidiary of the Major Minor label.

It was in the period of late 1966 to early 1967 that Calvin "Fuzzy" Samuel took over from Sam Southwell, and Conrad Isidore replaced John Seally. Keyboard player Ken Cumberbatch and second sax player Denis Overton also joined the group. The line up of the group then consisted of Colin Young on vocals, Oscar Knight on lead guitar, Calvin "Fuzzy" Samuel on bass, Ken Cumberbatch on keyboards, Tony Bauman and Denis Overton on saxophones and Conrad Isidore on drums.

In early 1968, Joe E. Young & the Toniks released the single, "Lifetime of Loving". It was part of Philip Solomon's three-single release to unveil the new logo for Toast Records which also included "You're Never Gonna Get My Love" by The Stocking Tops and "The Telephone by Nino Ferrer.

While with the Toniks, Young and co recorded the Soul Buster! album that was released in 1968. Produced by Pete Gage it featured the songs, "Lifetime of Lovin'", "Dancing Man", "Love How Sweet It Is", "Got That Feeling", "Good Day Sunshine", "You've Got A Good Thing Going", "Flower In My Hand", "Sixty Minutes of Your Love", "It's Been Such A Long Way Home", "Open the Door to Your Heart", "Qualifications" and "Lost Someone".

The group was booked to perform in June 1968, where they were to appear at the Rhodes Centre.

The group's single "Good Day Sunshine" bw "Lifetime of Lovin'" was released on Toast TT 514. It was reviewed in the 8 February 1969 issue of Record Mirror and given five stars. The reviewer said that it was a Record of the Week. With the right tempo being noted, the great swinging bluesy powerful droning attacking sounds were also mentioned. By the time of the release, Young had been out of the group for some time. The song had also appeared on their album.

==== The Foundations ====
It was reported in the 14 September issue of Melody Maker with Clem Curtis leaving The Foundations, the group was also trying out a line of singers which included Warren Davis of the Warren Davis Monday Band for the position of lead singer. Apparently Hue Montgomery was also a contender. Colin Young referred to as Joey Young in the 5 October issue of Melody Maker was the successful replacement for the departing Curtis. It was in late September / early October that Young had come on board. He had been rehearsing with them for the week of October 5 and was ready to make his debut on Friday October 4 at Aberdeen University.

In his early period with Young fronting the Foundations, he had to learn that he was just another group member. Other members put him in into Coventry, eventually he learnt to toe the line and was accepted by the other members.

It was mentioned in the 12 October issue of Melody Maker that the Foundations would record their next single "Build Me Up Buttercup" as soon as legal complications for the release of Joey Young (Colin Young) were sorted out with Major Minor Records which was his former label. With Young, the group released "Build Me Up Buttercup". It entered the UK chart on 26 November 19, 1968, and made the no. 2 spot on 31 December. It spent a total of fifteen weeks in the chart.

With Young on vocals the group recorded "In the Bad Bad Old Days (Before You Loved Me)". Backed with Young's own composition "Give Me Love", it was released on Pye 7N 17702. The song peaked at no. 8 in the UK and spent a total of ten weeks in the chart there.

The Digging the Foundations album was released in 1969. It was reviewed in the 5 July 1969 issue of Disc and Music Echo. In addition to "In the Bad, Bad Old Days", the album also included Young's composition, "A Penny, Sir".

Later in 1969, a self-titled album, The Foundations was released on Marble Arch MALS 1157. It was among the selection of lower priced records listed in the 18 October 1969 issue of New Musical Express. It featured stereo re-recordings of songs previously recorded by The Foundations. Young's composition "Give Me Love" was also included. The songs "Any Old Time (You're Lonely and Sad)", "Back on My Feet Again", "Harlem Shuffle", "Tomorrow" and "We Are Happy People" appeared on the Rocking the Foundations album released the previous year. "Baby Now That I've Found You" with Colin Young on vocals from the Marble Arch LP has the same backing track as the original Clem Curtis version. The new version of "Tomorrow" years later has been referred to as the alternate version. This version has Colin Young on vocals instead of Clem Curtis' vocals which appeared on the live version. They too have the same backing track. However, the Colin Young re-recording is a longer edit. It was originally on the Rocking the Foundations album which was a mixture of actual live and studio tracks. It's likely that there were some recordings with Clem Curtis on lead vocals in existence, but his vocals were replaced with those by Colin Young.

Young's singing on Foundations hits didn't end with "Build Me Up Buttercup" and "In the Bad Bad Old Days", He also sang on the hits, "My Little Chickadee" which was minor hit in the U.S. and Canada, "Born to Live, Born to Die" which was a hit in the UK. and "Baby, I Couldn't See". He also composed the song on the B side, "Penny Sir" which was adopted as the official song for the Save the Children Fund. The Foundations were donating the royalties from "Penny Sir" to the fund as well as performance royalties. The group was also planning a concert at the Royal Albert Hall to support the cause. "Baby, I Couldn't See" was a hit in the Netherlands where it got on to the Dutch Tipparade chart. Peaking at no. 8 on week three, it spent a total of four weeks in the chart.

=== 1970s ===
Young wrote a heavy blues song for The Foundations. "I'm Gonna Be a Rich Man" which was the B side to the single, "Take a Girl Like You". It was released again in June and July 1970 on Pye 7N 17956 with two different B sides. The first one had "Who Am I?" by Eric Allandale as the B side. The second had Young's composition, "In the Beginning as the B side. It was an instrumental. The group performed the song on Top of the Pops which was broadcast on 6 August that year.

It was reported in the 10 October 1970 issue of New Musical Express that lead singer Colin Young had left The Foundations to pursue a solo career. The Foundations broke up in late 1970. Young's claim later would be that the rest of the band had got above themselves. The band was hardly rehearsing, staying in the biggest most expensive hotels in the US and some members failing to turn up for bookings.

==== Development ====
Having left The Foundations and having signed with Barry Class for himself and his new group called Development in October 1970, Young was quoted in the 10 October issue of Melody Maker, saying that with his new group he would be singing his own songs from now on.

Under the management of Rodney Harrod and Philip Peverley, Development went to Argentina in early 1971. Having arrived in Argentina the group portrayed themselves as The Foundations, Development was pictured on the front page of the 3 January 1971 issue of Argentinian newspaper Crónica, as well as on page 2 with the accompanying article. The newspaper that wrote that the group having arrived in Ezeiza from London, they were to perform at the Expo show. In addition to giving descriptions of the band members, the article said that the group would be incorporating Latin rhythms into their music.

A year after Development's time in South America, the 4 March 1972 issue of Disc and Music Echo wrote that Development was looking forward to the release of their album that month. Recounting their success in Argentina, Colin Young also said that they were desperately hoping to get work in London. He was hoping that it would be known by the public how different from The Foundations they were.

An album credited to Colin Young's Development was actually released in Italy. In the Beginning was released on Stateside 3C O62- 92933) in 1971. The musicians on the album were, Steve Bingham, Roger Cawkwell, Laurie Jerryman, Gaspar Lawal, Peter Lynch, Graham Preskett, Tim Mason, Paul Nieman, Jean Roussel, Tony Priestland, Eddie "Tan Tan" Thornton and Colin Young.

=== Further activities ===
==== New Foundations ====
The New Foundations was an ensemble fronted by Colin Young in the mid 1970s. The New Foundations name was probably first used in 1968 by Astor Records in Australia when "Build Me Up Buttercup" was released there. It was also used again in 1969 when Clem Curtis' group, Clem Curtis and The New Foundations were touted as alternative attraction when the Foundations had to leave the US a week early due to the cancellation their week's booking at a Detroit cabaret.

In the mid-1970s, Colin Young and his "Foundations" group were on the road. Another group was also on the road. It was led by while Clem Curtis who had reformed The Foundations. Both groups were playing basically the same material. This eventually led to court action that resulted in Clem Curtis being allowed to bill his group as either The Foundations or Clem Curtis & The Foundations. Young was allowed to bill himself as The New Foundations or Colin Young & The New Foundations.

In 1975 an unrelated group with the same name New Foundations recorded a song, "Darling (You're All I Need)", a soul ballad which was released on Atlantic 45-322 in 1975. That recording was produced by George Kerr. This New Foundations was an American group.

In January 1976, Young and his group released their lone 45, "Something for My Baby" / "I Need Your Love" on Pye 7N 45533 which was credited to The New Foundations. Later in the year, Clem Curtis & The Foundations Ltd. released "Make a Wish" on Barry Class' Riverdale label.

=== 1980s ===
==== Mercy, Mercy ====
In the 1980s, as the lead singer of UK group Mercy, Mercy, he had a hit with "It Must Be Heaven". He formed the band with Luke Tunney.

On the week of 17 November 1984, "It Must Be Heaven" made its debut at no. 48 in the Music Week Disco and Dance Top Singles chart. The song got to no. 41 on the Record Mirror Disco chart and no. 39 on the Music Week Disco and Dance Top Singles chart.

He co-wrote the song, "What Are We Gonna Do About It" with Luke Tunney. The Mercy Mercy single made its debut at no. 54 on the Music Week Top 75 Disco & Dance Singles chart on the week of 17 August 1985. It also debuted on the Airplay Action Bubbling chart. It debuted at no. 85 on the Music Week The Next 25 chart on the week of 24 August and by the week of 21 September, it had made its debut at no. 59 in the Music Week Top 75 Singles chart. On the week of 6 October, James Hamilton said that Young and Tunney were causing quite a stir with the "98bpm reggae-soul jogger".

Tunney would later work with Carol Kenyon and co-wrote her single, "Fascinating" Kenyon recorded the song "Fascinating" which was released in Germany on CBS CBS 654707 6 in 1989.

=== 1990s ===
In 1999, a version of The Foundations was reformed that included Colin Young (vocals), Alan Warner (Guitar), Steve Bingham (bass), Gary Moberly (keyboards), Tony Laidlaw (sax) and Sam Kelly then Steve Dixon (drums). This version of the group was formed due to the popularity of the film There's Something About Mary and the interest created resulting from the 1968 hit "Build Me Up Buttercup" being featured in the film. Some time later Young left this version of the group and was replaced by Hue Montgomery (aka Hugh Montgomery).

=== 2000s ===
In 2003 Young recorded an updated version of "Build Me Up Buttercup" backed by a choir of policemen from the Surrey police force. The proceeds from the sale of the CD go to Milly's Fund, a trust set up in memory of murdered school girl Milly Dowler. Apparently the song was a favourite of hers. Produced by Diane Whiting and Maddy Mohamed, it featured "Build Me Up Buttercup by Colin Young & The Off Beats, "Buttercup Too" and "No Man is an Island" by Colin Young.

=== 2010s to 2020s ===
In 2010, Young appeared in Channel 4's Come Dine With Me, where he performed a song for dinner party guests. The performance was well received, but only one guest recognised him as he was number one in the year of her birth.

== Discography ==
7-inch singles
Act	Release	Catalogue	Year	Notes
Colin Young	"Any Time at All" / "You're No Good"	Trend 6099 005	1971	(B side of UK and German release Trend 6099 005 credited to Colin Young Introducing Development); Issued in the US on UNI 55286
New Foundations	"Something for My Baby" / "I Need Your Love"	PYE 45533	1975	
Mercy, Mercy	"It Must Be Heaven" / "It Must Be Heaven" (Part 2)	Ensign ENY 515	1984	Also in Germany on Island Records 106 996

12-inch singles
Act	Release	Catalogue	Year	Notes
Mercy, Mercy	"It Must Be Heaven" (Dancemix Part 1) / "It Must Be Heaven" (Dancemix Part 2)	Ensign Records 12ENY 515	1984	
Mercy, Mercy	"What Are We Gonna Do About It" (Extended Mix) / (Dub Mix)	Ensign Records 12ENY 522 DJ	1985	

CD singles
Act	Release	Catalogue	Year	Notes
Colin Young & The Offbeats, For Milly's Fund	"Build Me Up Buttercup" / "Buttercup Too" / "No Man Is An Island"	Ripe Music RIPEMCD1	2003	
Colin Young and The Come Dine With Me Crew	"Woman, Get Back To the Kitchen!"	Dave Lamb Records DLCD1	2010	
