= Spaghetti House =

- Directed by: Giulio Paradisi
- Written by: Age & Scarpelli; Peter Barnes; Nino Manfredi
- Starring: Nino Manfredi
- Cinematography: Giuliano Giustini
- Music by: Gianfranco Plenizio
- Release date: 22 October 1982
- Country: Italy
- Languages: Italian; English

Spaghetti House is a 1982 Italian comedy film directed by Giulio Paradisi. It is loosely based on the Spaghetti House siege that occurred in 1975.

== Plot ==
In an attempted armed robbery of an Italian restaurant in London, the staff members are taken hostage by three gunmen. The police besiege the building, but in the meantime, an unexpected solidarity among hostages and criminals is born.

== Cast ==
- Nino Manfredi as Domenico Ceccacci
- Rudolph Walker as Commander Martin
- Rita Tushingham as Kathy Ceccacci
- Leo Gullotta as Salvatore Manzilla
- Néstor Garay as Biagio Cerioni
- Gino Pernice as Valentino Cottai
- Derek Martin as Hutchinson
- Renato Scarpa as The Accountant
- Sandro Ghiani as Efisio
- Eddie Tagoe as Bill
- Elvis Payne as Tom
- David Burke as Davis
- John Woodvine as The Prosecutor
- Ian Redford as Buntin
- Patrick O'Connell as Mallory

== See also ==
- List of Italian films of 1982
