= Sunburst (dinghy) =

Class of small sailing boat

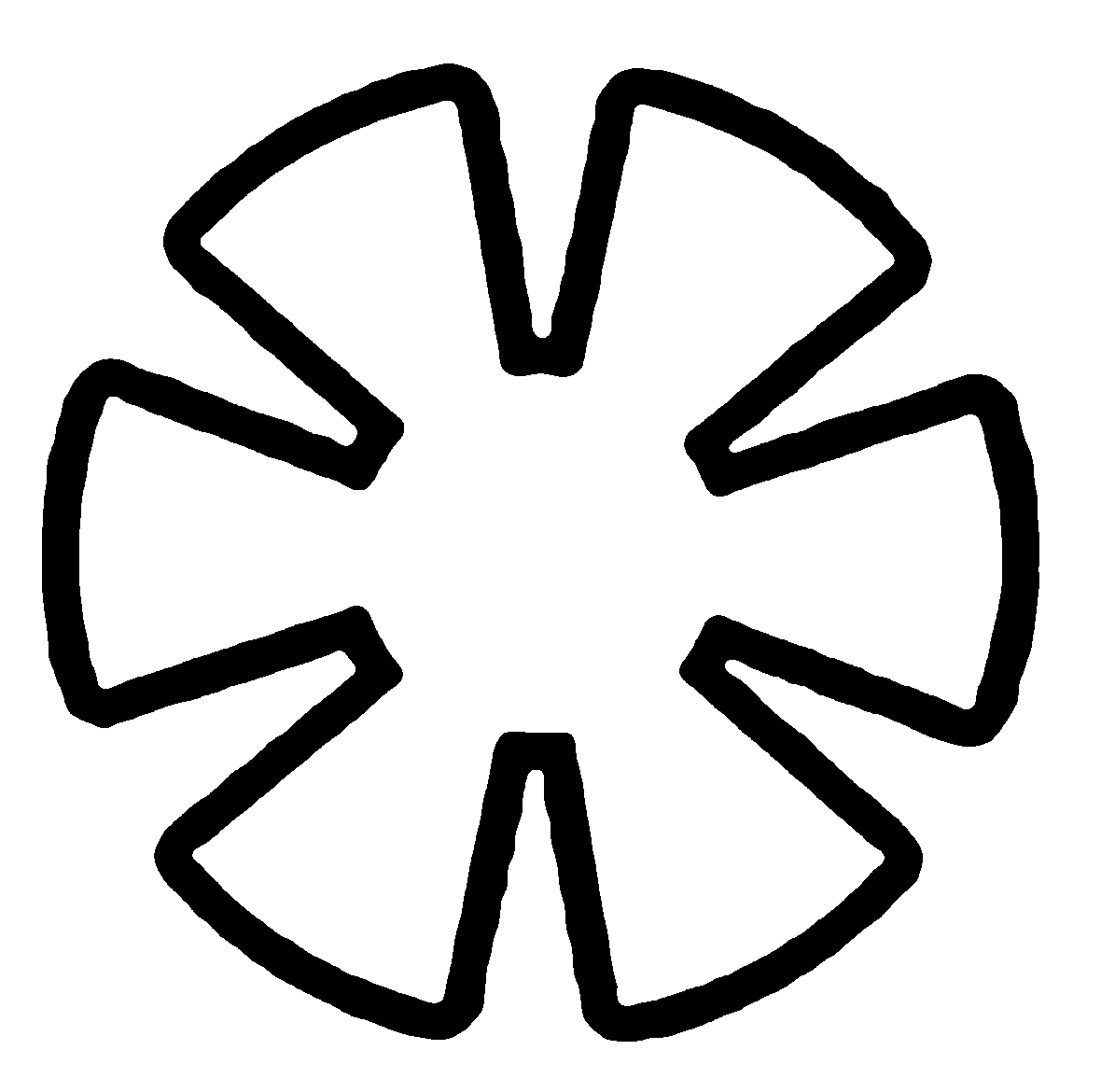

Boat
- Crew: 2

Hull
- Hull weight: 77 kg (170 lb)
- LOA: 3.5 m (11 ft)
- Beam: 1.5 m (4 ft 11 in)

The Sunburst is a two-handed, 3.5 metres (11 ft) centreboard sailing dinghy. It was designed in the late 1960s in New Zealand by John Balmain Brooke, where it was to become one of the most popular classes of boat. It is popular as a craft for teaching beginner sailors, and is used in races in New Zealand.

Although designed as a two-person boat, a Sunburst can easily be sailed by a single person in light to moderate conditions using just the mainsail only, or mainsail and jib. The Sunburst is usually rigged with a mainsail, jib and spinnaker. Construction is of wood or fiberglass, with a minimum hull weight of 77 kg. National Regattas are held annually

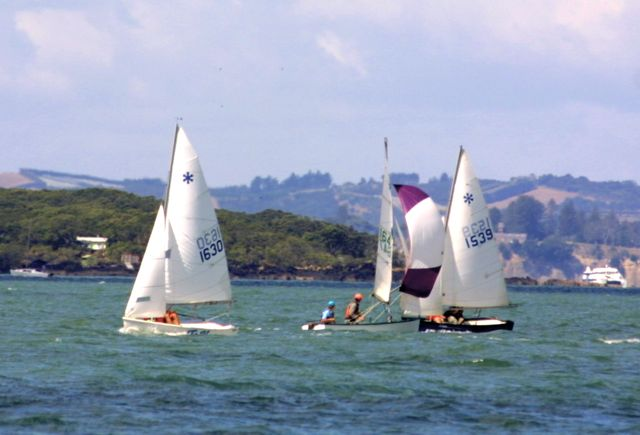
Sunburst nationals 2010
