= Build Me Up Buttercup =

1968 single by The Foundations

- One of side-A labels of the UK vinyl single

Single by the Foundations

from the album Build Me Up Buttercup (U.S.) The Foundations (U.K.)
- B-side: "New Direction"
- Released: 8 November 1968 (UK); 3 December 1968 (US)
- Recorded: 1968
- Genre: Pop-soul; bubblegum pop
- Length: 3:00
- Label: Pye; Uni
- Songwriters: Mike d'Abo; Tony Macaulay
- Producer: Tony Macaulay

The Foundations singles chronology
"Any Old Time" (1968)	"Build Me Up Buttercup" (1968)	"In the Bad Bad Old Days" (1969)

"Build Me Up Buttercup" is a song written by Mike d'Abo and Tony Macaulay, and released by The Foundations in 1968 with Colin Young singing lead vocals. Young had replaced Clem Curtis during 1968, and this was the first Foundations hit on which he sang.

It reached No. 1 on the Cash Box Top 100 and No. 3 on the US Billboard Hot 100 in early 1969. It was also a No. 2 hit in the United Kingdom, for two non-consecutive weeks. It was quickly certified Gold by the RIAA for sales of over a million US copies.

== In popular culture ==
"Build Me Up Buttercup" is featured in the 1998 romantic comedy film There's Something About Mary, the pilot episode "Truth Be Told" from the first season of the ABC TV spy drama series Alias, and the episode "Art Imitates Art" from the fourth season of the CBS TV detective series Elementary. This song was played during the final scene of the second to last episode of Fuller House. The track also features in the 2020 film The Kissing Booth 2, as well as in a series of 2020–21 Geico commercials.

The song is played at every home game by the Wisconsin Badgers Football Team. It was also played at every Los Angeles Angels home game during the seventh-inning stretch, before being eventually phased out for a rotation of variety of other songs. It is also a club anthem of Irish soccer club Shamrock Rovers.

== Charts ==
=== Weekly charts ===
Chart (1968–1969)	Peak position
Argentina	14
Australia (Go-Set)	1
Australia (Kent Music Report)	2
Belgium (Wallonia)	49
Canada RPM Top Singles	1
Ireland (IRMA)	3
Netherlands	9
New Zealand	4
Norway	3
South Africa	3
UK Singles (OCC)	2
US Billboard Hot 100	3
US Cash Box Top 100	1
West Germany	24

=== Year-end charts ===
Chart (1969)	Rank
Australia	22
Canada	13
US Billboard Hot 100	5
US Cash Box Top 100	9

== Certifications ==
Region	Certification	Certified units/sales
Spain (Promusicae)	Gold	30,000^{‡}
United Kingdom (BPI)	2× Platinum	1,200,000^{‡}
United States (RIAA)	Gold	1,000,000^{^}
^{^} Shipments figures based on certification alone.^{‡} Sales+streaming figures based on certification alone.

== Personnel ==
- Colin Young – vocals
- Alan Warner – lead guitar
- Peter Macbeth – bass guitar
- Tim Harris – drums, percussion
- Tony Gomez – keyboards
- Mike Elliott – tenor saxophone
- Eric Allandale – trombone
- Mike d'Abo – piano

== Other versions ==
A version by British trio Partyboys reached No. 44 on the UK Singles Chart in 2003.

David Johansen recorded a live version of the song on his concert album Live It Up. The album was recorded over two nights on February 4 and 5, 1982, at the Paradise Theatre (now known as the Paradise Rock Club) in Boston, Massachusetts.

A version by Pop-punk band 'The Goops' appears in the 1995 film Mallrats
