= Sunburst Records =

Sunburst Records can refer to any of the following:

- "Sunburst Records", a subsidiary of the now defunct Opal Productions which played host to Melvin Bliss' records
- "Sunburst Records", a label used by the Pine Hill Haints
