= Teddy Robin and the Playboys =

1960s Hong Kong band

- Origin: Hong Kong
- Genres: Hong Kong English pop, garage rock, rock and roll
- Years active: 1966–1970
- Labels: Diamond Records/Universal Music
- Past members: Teddy Robin; Norman Cheng; William Kwan; Raymond Kwan; Frederick Chan; Ricky Chan

Teddy Robin and the Playboys was a 1960s Hong Kong English pop and rock band. The most notable members were Teddy Robin (vocals/guitar), who has a successful career as a singer/songwriter, actor, and filmmaker; and Norman Cheng (lead guitar), who later became a top executive in charge of Polydor Records' Southeast Asian operations in the 1970s, and is the father of actor/singer Ronald Cheng. Other members included Teddy Robin's two brothers, Raymond and William Kwan, on rhythm guitar and bass, respectively; Frederick Chan on drums; and later, Ricky Chan on keyboards. Their first EP, "Lies" b/w "Six Days in May", was released in 1966. Other popular cover hits included "Pretty Blue Eyes", "Lies", and "Carousel".

== Discography ==
=== Studio albums ===
- 1967 - Not All Lies
- 1967 - Breakthrough
- 1968 - 365 Days
- 1968 - Memories

=== EPs ===
- 1966 - "Lies" b/w "Six Days in May"

=== Compilations ===
- 1969 - The Best Of...
- 2005 - The 'In' Sounds of Hong Kong!
- 2008 - Teddy Robin & The Playboys
