= It Must Be Heaven (song) =

"It Must be Heaven"

Single by Mercy, Mercy
- B-side: "It Must Be Heaven (Part 2)"
- Released: 1984
- Label: Ensign 12ENY 515
- Songwriter(s): L. Tunney/C. Young/R. Gavin
- Producer(s): Tony Eyers

Mercy, Mercy singles chronology
"It Must be Heaven" (1984)	"What Are We Gonna Do About It?" (1985)

"It Must Be Heaven" was a 1984 single for the UK R&B/dance group Mercy, Mercy. It became a chart hit for them that year.

== Background ==
Mercy, Mercy was a group that Colin Young formed with Luke Tunney.

The single "It Must Be Heaven" was released as a single in a 7" and 12" vinyl format by Ensign/Island Records.

== Reception ==
The single was reviewed by Marvin B Macclefish in the 17 November 1984 issue of Record Mirror. In his review, he called it a Conveyor belt, convictionless, meandering jiggly thumper, finishing off by stating "With Floy Joy around, why bother?".

According to James Hamilton in his Odds 'N Bods column, records by Brass Construction, Mercy Mercy and Fonda Rae were burning out before the finished copies hit the shops. He also said that tracks by Switch and Rose Royce were seemingly unaffected by the wait. He put it down to saturation on London's soul radio.

== Airplay ==
According to the 29 September 1984 issue of Music Week, "It Must Be Heaven" was one of the "climbers" on Radio London.

The song was being played at ERT 2 in Thessaloniki, Greece. According to the 17 December 1984 issue of Euro Tip Sheet DJ / producer, Lefty Kongalides had it as a hot add. It was also at no. 7 on the play list. In the 7 January 1985 issue of Euro Tip Sheet, it was at no. 4 on Kongalides' Hot disco/dance playlist.

The 14 January 1985 issue of Euro Tip Sheet showed that Jo Lueders of Radio Xanadu in Germany was playing the record.

It was shown in the 17 February issue of Euro Tip Sheet that Harald Rehmann at RTL Luxembourg had "It Must Be Heaven" as the record of the week.

== Chart performance ==
The record debuted at No. 81 in the Record Mirror disco chart the week of 13 October 1984.

The record made its debut at no. 48 in the Music Week Disco and Dance Top Singles chart the week of 17 November. The following week it was at no. 39.

Chart (1984)	Peak position
UK, Disco (Record Mirror)	41
UK, Disco and Dance Top Singles (Music Week)	39
