= Slam Creepers =

Swedish rock band

- Origin: Sweden
- Genres: Beat, rock
- Years active: 1962–1969
- Labels: Bill Records, Olga Records
- Past members: 1963–1969; Björn Skifs; Kenneth Windahl; Lars Christians; Lollo Svenson; Janne Fackt; Kent Igelstrom

Slam Creepers were a rock band from Vansbro, Sweden formed by Björn Skifs in 1962 and broke up in 1969. Björn Skifs then went on a solo career. They had some moderate hits including a cover of a Foundations song "We Are Happy People". Skifs would later find success with a number 1 hit "Hooked on a Feeling as a member of Blue Swede.

The name is a humorous anglicisation of Swedish 'slamkrypare', 'mud crawlers', a slang name for a kind of shoes.

== Discography ==
=== Singles ===
- "Go On Home Baby" / "Nobody" - Bill BT 106 - 1966
- "Cross A Million Mountains I've Got A Way Of My Own" - Bill BT 110 - 1966
- "You've Lost That Lovin' Feelin'" / "See Saw" - Bill BT 113 - 1967
- "Funny How Love Can Be" / "En Sång Om Kärlek" - Bill BT 114 - 1967
- "Big Black Piano Too Good To Be Real Bill" BT 118 - 1967
- "Lemon Tree" / "Open The Door To Your Heart" - Bill BT 119 - 1967
- "Joe's Got The Right" / "I Put A Spell On You" - Bill BT 121 - 1967
- "It's Saturday" / "Listen Hold It Baby" - Bill BT 122 - 1968
- "Love A Go Go" / "Vansbro Memories" - Bill BT 123 - 1968
- "Mister Personality Man" / "Cash Box Ladies Behaviour Bill" BT 126 - 1968
- "We Are Happy People" / "I Just Couldn't Get You Out Of My Mind" - Bill BT 128 - 1968
- "Ha Ha Ha" / "Livin' With Lies" - Bill BT 129 - 1968
- "My Horoscope" / "Vi Lever Glada Dagar" - Bill BT 130 1968
- "Land Of Love" / "Sweet Ruth" - Bill BT 136 - 1969
- "Every Bit Of My Life" (Credited to "Björn Skifs" / "Lovey Dovey" - Bill BT 141 - 1969

=== EP ===
- "Nobody" / "Good To Me" / "Go On Home Baby" / "Gotta Take The First Plane Home" - Bill BTE 105 - 1966

=== Albums ===
- Bubbles - Bill BTLP 11 - 1967
- Sweet Ruth - Bill BTLP 12 - 1968
