= Sunburst (band) =

- Origin: Dar es Salaam, Tanzania
- Genres: Rock, afro rock, funk rock, psychedelic rock
- Years active: 1970–1977
- Label: Strut
- Past members: Eric Allandale; Hembi Flory Congo; Bashir Idi Farhan; John Fernandes "Rocks"; James Mpungo; Kassim Rajab Magati; Katako Lubula; Kazadi Mbiya

Sunburst was an African band that was formed in 1970 by Zairean guitarist Hembi Flory Kongo. One of its members was Eric Allandale who used to be with The Foundations, and previously the New Orleans Knights. The band is a part of African music history.

== Biographical ==
Their music was a combo of Afro-rock, Zamrock, and Kitoto. Following a radio session in 1973, the band gained national attention. A month after that in July they won a band competition in Dar Es Salaam and grew more popular. They also recorded singles in Kenya. In 1976 they were working on an album. Their album was released in 1977 and around that time they had split up. Prior to the recording of their album, they had recorded a session for Tanzanian radio.

They were managed by Peter Bagshawe. Prior to becoming the manager for the band, Bagshawe originally from Yorkshire was a steam train enthusiast and living in Zambia at the time.

in 2016, the Ave Africa, The Complete Recordings 1973-1976 album was released. It was released on Strut Records.

== Band members ==
- Hembi Flory Kongo
- Johnny “Rocks” Fernandes
- Bashir Idi Farhan
- Kassim Magati
- James Mpungo
- Eric Allandale

=== Management and other ===
- Peter Bagshawe (Manager)

== Releases ==
7" vinyl recordings
Year	Note	Title	Label	catalogue #
1973	Kenyan release	Enzi Za Utumwani / Matatizo Nyumbani	Moto Moto	MOTO 7-108
1973	French release	Enzi Za Utumwani / Matatiso Nyumbani	RCA Victor; Africana series	FWBO 9301
1973	Kenyan release	Let's Live Together / Black Is Beautiful	Moto Moto	MOTO 7-107
1973	French release	Let's Live Together / Black Is Beautiful	RCA Victor; Africana series	FWBO 9302
1976	Tanzanian release	Kipato Sina / Mai Wetu Mai	TFC	TFC 2003
1976	Tanzanian release	Vijana / K.K. of Zambia	TFC	TFC 2005
1976	Tanzanian release	Simba Anguruma / Banchikicha	TFC	TFC 2004

Albums
Year	Note	Title	Label	Catalogue #
1976	Zambian release (LP)	Ave Africa	Kitoto Records	KTL 001
2016	UK release 2 × Vinyl, LP, Compilation, 180 Gram	Ave Africa: The Complete Recordings 1973-1976	Strut	STRUT128LP
2016	UK release 2 × CD, Compilation	Ave Africa: The Complete Recordings 1973-1976	Strut	STRUT128CD

- Note: The limited-edition version includes a bonus cassette, Strut STRUT128C

== Links ==
- Interview with manager Peter Bagshawe
