= Society of Seven =

Musical group

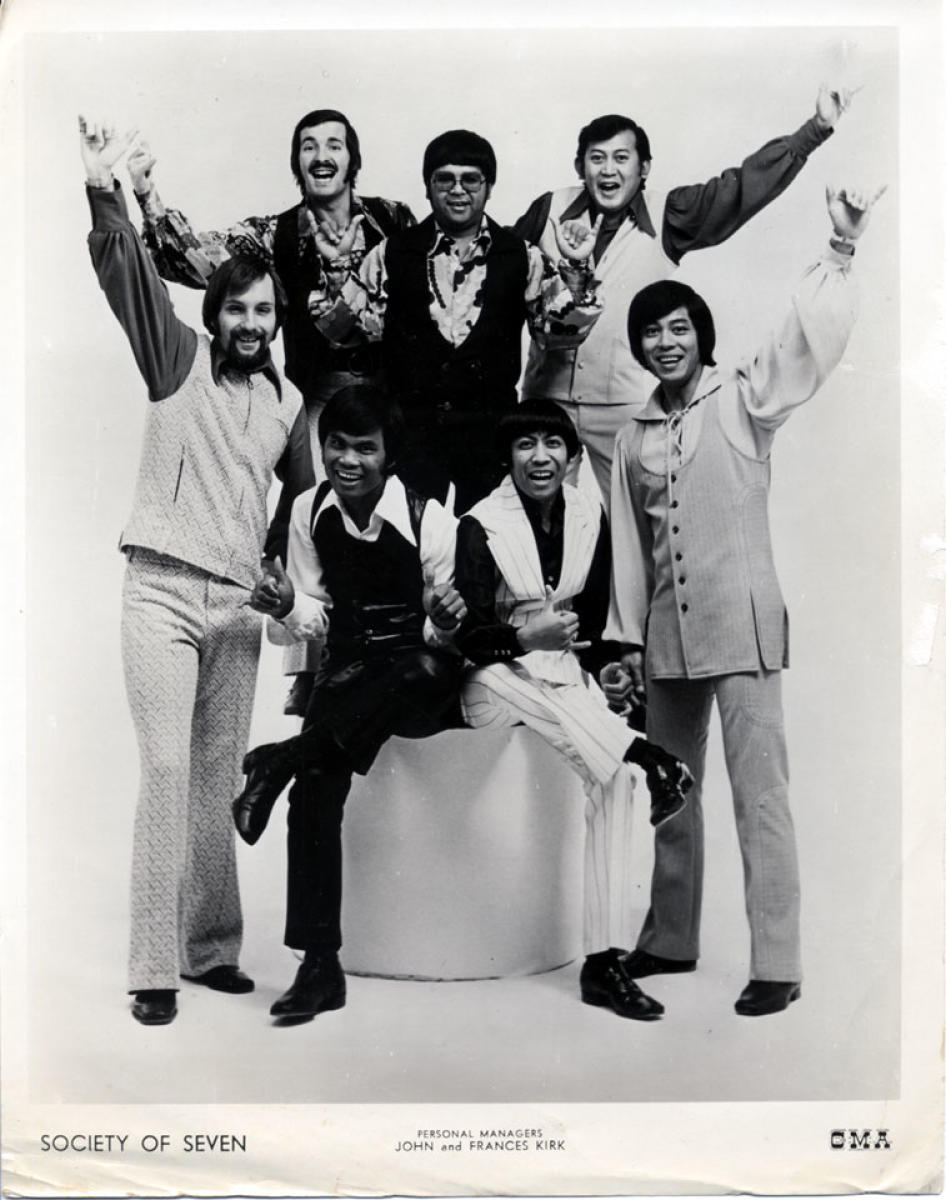
The Society of Seven in a promotional print material, c. 1970s

The Society of Seven (SOS) is a musical group that performs a variety show of the same name. Based in Hawaii, it was formed in 1969 from the pop group known as the Fabulous Echoes, which originated in Hong Kong in the early 1960s. The group mainly performed at the Main Showroom of the Outrigger Waikiki in Hawaii, and has toured Las Vegas, Los Angeles, San Francisco, and other major cities in the West Coast of the United States. Its original members were Tony Ruivivar, Bert Sagum, Don Gay, Terry Lucido, Roberto Nievera, Stan Robertson, and Danny Ruivivar.

The troupe performs a variety of songs (particularly Broadway showtunes), comedy sketches, and celebrity impersonations. It has also recorded for several national and local record labels, although record sales were primarily in Hawaii record stores and as souvenirs at the group's performances—in that context, the group's hits include "Walk Away," "99.8" and "I'll Love You Through It All." The SOS released a number of records in Asia, recording with the Hong Kong–based Diamond Records. Their version of "A Little Bit of Soap" was No. 1 for 32 weeks on the Hong Kong charts, as well as being a hit in neighboring countries. That started a string of hits, and they had a double hit with "Dancing on the Moon" and "Sunshine" (a ballad written by Diamond Music co-director Frances da Silva-Kirk and Vic Cristobal).

== History ==
The Society of Seven opened at the Main Showroom of the Outrigger Waikiki in 1969 for what was originally a four-week engagement in place of Tommy Sands. There was considerable turnover in the roster in the years that followed—three members of the group, Danny Ruivivar, Terry Lucido and Gary Bautista (who joined in 1984), died, and more than 14 others came and went during the next four decades. However, two members of the original 1969 SOS group—SOS leader Tony Ruivivar and vocalist Bert Sagum, both also members of the original Fabulous Echoes group—were still there when the group celebrated its 32nd anniversary at the Outrigger in 2001. That is believed to be the record for a Waikiki act as the headliner of single major venue (Don Ho was a Waikiki headliner for 43 years, but he headlined several different venues between 1964 and 2007; Danny Kaleikini, another major Hawaiian entertainer, headlined the Maile Terrace at what was then the Kahala Hilton, a few miles outside Waikiki, for 27 years [1967-1994]).

In 2001, a second troupe was formed, Society of Seven LV. When the formation of the SOS LV was first announced the publicists said that the original SOS group would remain based in Waikiki and the younger group, with the "LV" short for Las Vegas would be based in Las Vegas. However, the original SOS eventually moved to Las Vegas and the Society of Seven LV became the resident version of the group at the Outrigger, though the original Society Of Seven has returned to Hawaii for several concert-style performances at the Hawaii Theater in downtown Honolulu.

As of May 2009, Society of Seven with Lani Misalucha could be seen performing at the Flamingo Las Vegas and Society of Seven LV, with Jasmine Trias can be seen at the Outrigger Waikiki Hotel in Honolulu, Hawaii. Trias, a finalist on the American Idol TV show, was born and raised in Mililani, Hawaii, near Honolulu, and was seen as a natural addition to the show.

On November 6, 2009, the Society of Seven opened a new show with Jasmine Trias doing comedy, impression and dance under a one-year contract to perform two shows Friday, Saturday and Sunday at the Gold Coast Hotel and Casino located one mile (1.6 km) west of the Las Vegas Strip on West Flamingo Road. This relationship has continued a second year, with Trias joining SOS in their sold-out October 22, 2011, show at Atlantis Casino Resort in Reno, Nevada.

Starting in 2010, when Trias has had other obligations, her place has been taken by Arshiel Calatrava, a high school student from Kalihi, Hawaii, continuing the SOS tradition of showcasing Hawaiian talent.

The original SOS group received a "Lifetime Achievement Award" from the Hawai'i Academy of Recording Arts (HARA) in 2007. The group was voted "the Best Show in Waikiki" by the readers of Honolulu Magazine.
