= Rico's Combo =

1960s band

- Origin: England
- Genre: Ska
- Label: Planetone
- Past members: Rico Rodriguez; Lovett Brown; Mike Elliott; Jackie Edwards

Rico's Combo were a studio band, that recorded on the Planetone label in the early 1960s.

== History ==
Rico's Combo recorded for the Planetone record label that was founded by Sonny Roberts in 1961 who would also release recordings by Mike Elliott, George Bailey, Jackie Foster, and Zephies Group. The group, which was led by the Jamaican trombonist Rico Rodriguez, recorded some ska records for the label in the early 1960s. When Rodrigues was not present on the recordings, the group would go by the name of The Planets.

They were also the house band for the Planetone label. Artists such as Dandy Livingstone, Tito Simon aka Sugar & Dandy and the Marvels recorded at the Planetone studio. This made Rico Rodriguez happy as he was given the opportunity to play Ska again.

It appears that the first release which was credited to Rico's Combo as a stand-alone band was "London Here I Come" bw "Midnight in Eihiopia".

Two tracks from this group, "London Here I Come" and "Hitch and Scramble", appeared on the Rodriguez's Trombone Man Anthology 1961-1971 CD.

== Later years ==
Mike Elliott would join The Foundations around 1967. In 1972, he had his own single released on the Ackee Record label. The record was "Milk and Honey", credited to Mike Elliot, backed with "Burst a Shirt" which is credited to Mike Elliot with Harvey & Errol.

Rodriguez would release his Man from Wareika album in the mid 1970s and play on the "Ghost Town" single by The Specials.

Rodriguez died on 4 September 2015 at age 80.

== Members ==
- Rico Rodriguez - (Trombone)
- Lovett Brown - (Saxophone)
- Mike Elliott - (Saxophone)
- Jackie Edwards - (Piano)

== Discography ==
- "London Here I Come" / "Midnight In Ethiopia" - Planetone RC 1
- "Planet Rock" / "You Win" - Plantone RC 4
- "Hitch and Scramble" / "Gee's Boogie" - Planetone RC 6
- "Mighty As a Rose" / "Tell All Those Girls" (The Marvelles) - Planetone PT 35
