= Mike Elliott (saxophonist) =

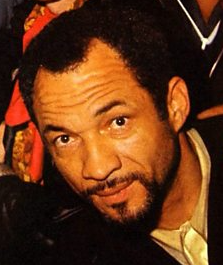
- Elliott in 1968

Background information
- Born: Michael Elliott; 6 August 1929 (age 97); Kingston, Jamaica
- Genres: Reggae, ska, jazz, pop, soul
- Occupation: Musician
- Instrument: Saxophone
- Years active: (1960s–1970s)
- Labels: Planetone, Carnival, Pye, Ackee Records, Lord Koos
- Formerly of: Rico's Combo, The Planets, Colin Hicks & The Cabin Boys, The Foundations

Mike Elliott (born 6 August 1929) is a Jamaican-born British saxophonist. He played on ska recordings in the early 1960s and on pop and soul music hits in the late 1960s. He is best known as a co-founding member of the British band The Foundations, and played on their hit singles "Baby, Now That I've Found You" and "Build Me Up Buttercup".

== Background ==
Mike Elliott was born on 6 August 1929 in Kingston, Jamaica to parents George and Etheline. He had six brothers and three sisters.

In November 1967 Mike was living in a Paddington flat, identifying as a Rastafari, with a liking for progressive jazz.

== Career ==
=== Late 1950s to early 1960s ===
Elliott was also a member of The Cabin Boys, led by Colin Hicks the brother of British rock 'n' roll singer Tommy Steele.

Planetone and Rico's Combo period

Elliott was a member of Rico's Combo who were a house / studio band led by Jamaican trombonist Rico Rodriguez. Besides Rodriguez on Trombone and Elliott on saxophone, the band included another saxophonist Lovett Brown and Jackie Edwards on piano etc. When Rodriguez wasn't present, the ensemble appeared to be called The Planets. They played on early 1960s Jamaican Ska recordings issued on the Planetone label such as "London Here I Come" bw "Midnight In Ethiopia" and "Hitch and Scramble" bw "Gee's Boogie" (recorded in 1962).

Elliott also recorded under his own name for the Planetone label. The Planetone singles were shared with other artists. His recording "This Love of Mine" appeared on the flip side of Terry Moon's "Moon Man" (Planetone RC11), "J.K. Shuffle" appeared as the flip side to Basil John's "Drink and Drive" (Planetone RC 12). "This Love of Mine" would actually appear again in 1964 as the A side on Carnival CV 7008. The B side was "Things Are Getting Better" by Young Satchmo.

Other ventures

At some stage, Elliott had played with jazz saxophonists Tubby Hayes and Ronnie Scott.

=== Mid to late 1960s ===
The Foundations

By 1967 he was a member of the multi-racial English soul group The Foundations who would be known for their million selling hits with "Baby, Now That I've Found You" and "Build Me Up Buttercup" etc. The group had evolved out of The Ramong Sound which featured Ramong Morrison. He had come into the group via a Foundations member who he had met. The member told him that the group was looking for a tenor sax man. At 38 years of age he was the oldest member of the group and was nearly 20 years older than the youngest member of the group 18-year-old Tim Harris. He was part of their three-man brass section playing Tenor Sax alongside fellow Jamaican tenor saxophonist and flautist Pat Burke and Dominican trombonist Eric Allandale. The other members were Clem Curtis (Curtis Clements) on vocals, Peter Macbeth (Peter McGrath) on bass, Allan Warner on lead guitar, and Tony Gomesz on organ. At some stage the group had been discovered by Ron Fairway the manager of a group called The Ways and Means. Fairway introduced them to Barry Class.

In the early period, the Foundations were struggling to make ends meet. Some of the members were staying on the premises of a club that they managed themselves. The premises at one time had been a gambling den. They played music nightly and took care of the cooking and cleaning. They would get to bed around 6am or 7am, sleep until 4pm, and open again at 8pm. Sometimes they barely made enough money to cover the rent, occasionally living off leftovers and a couple of pounds of rice. Elliott's situation hadn't been the best either. According to the " 'Before this record, WE were just what you'd call 'bums" say the Foundations" that appeared in the 11 November 1967 issue of Record Mirror, Elliott had been residing and paying rent for a top floor flat that was in a condemned house where the roof had been removed. Lead singer Clem Curtis recalled going to see him one morning. Elliott was in bed when Curtis knocked on his door. He asked him, "Hey, Mike, where's your roof gone?". Elliott replied, "I don't know, man, they just came and knocked it off."

In an article from the December, 1967 issue of Beat Instrumental by Crotus Pike, Elliott who was playing a Conn Mark 10 saxophone, and had played with the like of jazz greats Tubby Hayes and Ronnie Scott explained that the transition to pop and soul had been automatic for him. But he did say that the melody line in a group like the Foundations was more important and that he explained saying, "I try very hard to give the vocalist a proper harmony, so he can put over the tune at its best".

In the 14 December 1967 issue of Melody Maker, Eric Allandale was supposedly interviewed for the Blind Date section. The accompanying sketch was of Mike Elliott, not Eric Allandale! This error could also suggest that Elliott was the interviewee instead of Allandale.

While with The Foundations, Elliott came no. 9 in the Brass & Woodwind category of the 1967 Beat Instrumental Gold Star Awards which were displayed in the magazine's February, 1968 issue.

Recording and performance

Eliott's time with the Foundations from the first hit in 1967 until he would leave around the same time as Clem Curtis did in August 1968 puts him on their first three hit singles, "Baby, Now That I've Found You", "Back on My Feet Again" and "Any Old Time (You're Lonely And Sad)". The time-line also puts him with the group in January, 1968 on the French television show, Bouton Rouge. Their appearance was recorded on the 30th of that month, He also would have played on their PYE debut album From the Foundations, a live album Rocking the Foundations, Top of the Pops live broadcast recordings from 11 October 1967 to 8 March 1968, and other recordings during that period. He also played on three Foundations tracks at a John Peel session in January 1968.

Other activities

In 1968 The Foundations were experiencing some problems within their group as well as problems with their songwriter and producer Tony Macaulay who wouldn't allow them to record their own compositions. Around that time the band had recorded a track called "It's All Right", a live favourite of theirs and quite possibly the last Foundations recording he played on. He left around the same time as the Foundations lead singer Clem Curtis, who left to pursue a solo career. Some sources say that Elliott's departure signalled the internal dissatisfaction. He wasn't replaced.

=== 1970s ===
In 1972 Elliott appeared on the scene again with a single released on the Ackee Record label. The record was "Milk and Honey", credited to Mike Elliot, backed with "Burst A Shirt" which is credited to Mike Elliot with Harvey & Errol. "Milk And Honey" would turn up as the flip side of Junior English's "One And Only" which was produced by Lord Koos.

Elliott supposedly had some involvement with another reggae single released on Supreme SUP 225 by Eugene & Burst and backed with a track by Denzil & Burst. The songs were "Let It Fall" on side 1 and "Can't Change" on side 2. This was released on the label in 1971. The recordings were produced by Sidney Crooks. The book Tighten Up!: The History of Reggae in the UK alleges that Eugene and Burst are Eugene Paul and Mike Elliott. It also says that the Denzil and Burst are Denzil Dennis and Mike Elliott.

During his time, Elliott along Sonny Burke had also worked with Eddie "Tan Tan" Thornton.

== Later years ==
In a 2022 interview with Strange Brew, Foundations guitarist Alan Warner was talking about the relationship the band had with Tony Macaulay. He also talked about the members and in reference to Mike Elliott said, "The oldest guy in the band he was about forty". Then said "Funny enough I found out the other day, that he's still around. He celebrated his 90th ... or ninety something birthday the other day, I couldn't believe it!"

== Discography ==
=== Singles ===
Singles
Act	Release	Catalogue	Year	Notes
Terry Moon Mike Elliott	"Moon Man"; Mike Elliot	Planetone RC11	1963	
Basil John Mike Elliott	"Drink And Drive" "J.K. Shuffle"	Planetone RC12	1963	
Mike Elliot Young Satchmo	"This Love of Mine" "Things Are Getting Better"	Carnival CV 7008, 1964	1964	
Eugene & Burst Denzil & Burst	"Let It Fall" "Can't Change"	Supreme SUP225	1971	
Mike Elliott Mike Elliott & Errol	"Milk & Honey" "Burst a Shirt"	Ackee ACK151	1972	
Junior English Mike Elliott	"One And Only Lover" "Milk & Honey"	Gee's Records GE45-1053		

Various artists compilation appearances
Title	Track	Catalogue	Year	Notes
The Ska's The Limit	"This Love of Mine"	Carnival CX 1000		
The Memory of Slim Smith	"Milk And Honey"	Lord Koos Records KLP 1		
