= Carnival Records (UK label) =

England-based record label

Carnival
- Parent company: Crossbow
- Founder: Alan Crawford aka Allan Crawford
- Status: Defunct
- Genre: Reggae, ska
- Country of origin: England

Carnival Records was an English-based record label run by Australian businessman Alan Crawford. It released mainly reggae and ska recordings from 1963 to 1965. Artists who have had releases on the label include The African Messengers, Errol Dixon, Mike Elliott, Oscar James, Dandy Livingstone, Sugar 'N' Dandy, Sunny and the Hi-Jumpers and The Wes Minster Five

== Background ==
Carnival Records was owned by Allan Crawford an ex-pat Australian living in London. He had worked for one of the largest music publishers around, Southern Music. Venturing out, he set up his own music publishing company Merit Music. The record labels he set up were, Cannon, Carnival, Crossbow and Rocket. Using session musicians and singers, crossbow would put out cover versions (exploito recordings) of current hits. Ross McManus who was the father of Elvis Costello would come in sing on a lot of the recordings, changing his voice to suit. The records were available via mail order. Original recordings were issued via the Carnival and Sabre labels.

Keith “Sugar” Simone who was popular as a gospel singer in his native Jamaica came to England in 1961 to further his education. He found work as an engineer while getting singing gigs. In 1963, he auditioned at Planetone Records and came into contact with Alan Crawford. Crawford signed him to Carnival and he cut six singles for the label. He later signed with Island Records.

Dandy Livingstone's entry into Carnival came about as a result of a phone call from Lee Gopthal. He was told by Gopthal that Allan Crawford (who at the time owned Radio Caroline) wanted to get in touch with the Jamaican scene. The label in their quest to find West Indian acts wanted to release a recording credited to a duo. A made-up name of Sugar 'N' Dandy was used. This was influenced by Livingstone's sweet voice and the sharp way he dressed. Apparently Livingstone's friend Roy Smith was supposed to be present for the recording session but never turned up. A type of double tracking was used to give the impression of a duo singing. This was where Livingstone made his recording debut. Roy Smith did sing on three more recordings for the Sugar 'N Dandy releases. Tito Simon added his voice for one Sugar 'N Spice release, "Only Heaven Knows" bw "Let’s Ska".

== History ==
=== 1963 ===
The first single the label issued was "Oo-Wee-Baby" bw "Twisting & Shaking" by Errol Dixon, Carnival CV 7001 in 1963. The next single also featured Dixon. Credited to Errol Dixon & Maynell Wilson, "Crazy Baby" bw "Our First Love" was issued on Carnival CV 7002 the same year.

In 1963, the label issued "White Christmas" by Mel Turner with the Souvenirs and the Mohicans. With his picture at the top of the page and being referred to "Wild man" Mel Turner", his record was reviewed in the December 21 issue of Record Mirror. Given a four-star rating the slow thumping beat of the Irving Berlin standard, the bluesy Ketty Lester type piano and female backing were noted. The B side was instrumental with a lot of saxophone. With the reviewer calling whole record "pretty good", good sales for that time of year were predicted. The single did really well but poor distribution meant it was unavailable to many.

=== 1964 ===
In 1964, Mel Turner recorded "The Hermit and the Rose Tree" bw "What's The Matter With Me". Conducted by Alan Moorhouse, the sessions were produced by Allan Crawford. It was reviewed in the May 9 issue of Record Mirror with the reviewer call it an "excellent disc" and having "Soft and gentle with a commercial flavor". The single was also issued in picture cover format in The Netherlands on Delta DS-1134.

In 1964, future Foundations sax man Mike Elliott had "This Love of Mine" bw "Things Are Getting Better" by Young Satchmo issued on Carnival CV 7008. "This Love of Mine" was previously issued on the Planetone label that Elliott had recorded for a year earlier.

It was reported by Billboard in the May 9, 1964 issue that Allan Crawford who at the time was chairman for Radio Caroline and head of Merit Music would be making use of the radio station for the artists that were signed to Carnival.

The label issued a compilation LP in 1964. Containing 14 tracks, the album, The Ska's the Limit was issued on Carnival CX 1000. It would also be issued on Page One FOR 006 the same year.

Also in 1964, The African Messengers had their first single released on the label. It was "Highlife Piccadilly" bw "Blues For Messengers". The group had two Nigerians, Peter King a multi-instrumentalist and Mike Falana a trumpet player. Other members were Paul Chukuwma Edoh on congas, David ‘Happy’ Williams on bass and James Menin on drums. Mike Falana was a star in his own right. In 1963 on the jazz club secne, he had solo billing as well as billing as a featured artist with the Joe Harriot Quintet as well as the John Williams Big Band. Also known as Mike Fallana, he had been a member of The Johnny Burch Octet. He would later be recruited by Graham Bond to be part of his group, The Graham Bond Organisation. And later for a short time, he was a member of The Ramong Sound. The African Messengers released one other single in 1964, "Come Back to Me" bw "Niger Blues", released on Carnival CV 7021. They would release one more single in the following year.

=== 1965 ===
In 1965, Sunny and the Hi Jumpers had "Going to Damascus" bw "Sweet Potatoes" issued on Carnival CV 7025. It was produced by Tony Day and Alan Zaffert. The following release was "Hey Little Boy" bw "Where Have You Been" by Dino and Del, released on Carnival CV 7026.

The last single issued on the label appears to be "I Don't Know What I'm Gonna Do Now" bw "I Want To Be Your Lover" by Sugar 'N' Dandy. Tony Day and Alan Zaffert produced the recordings.
