= Rude boy =

Jamaican street subculture since 1960s

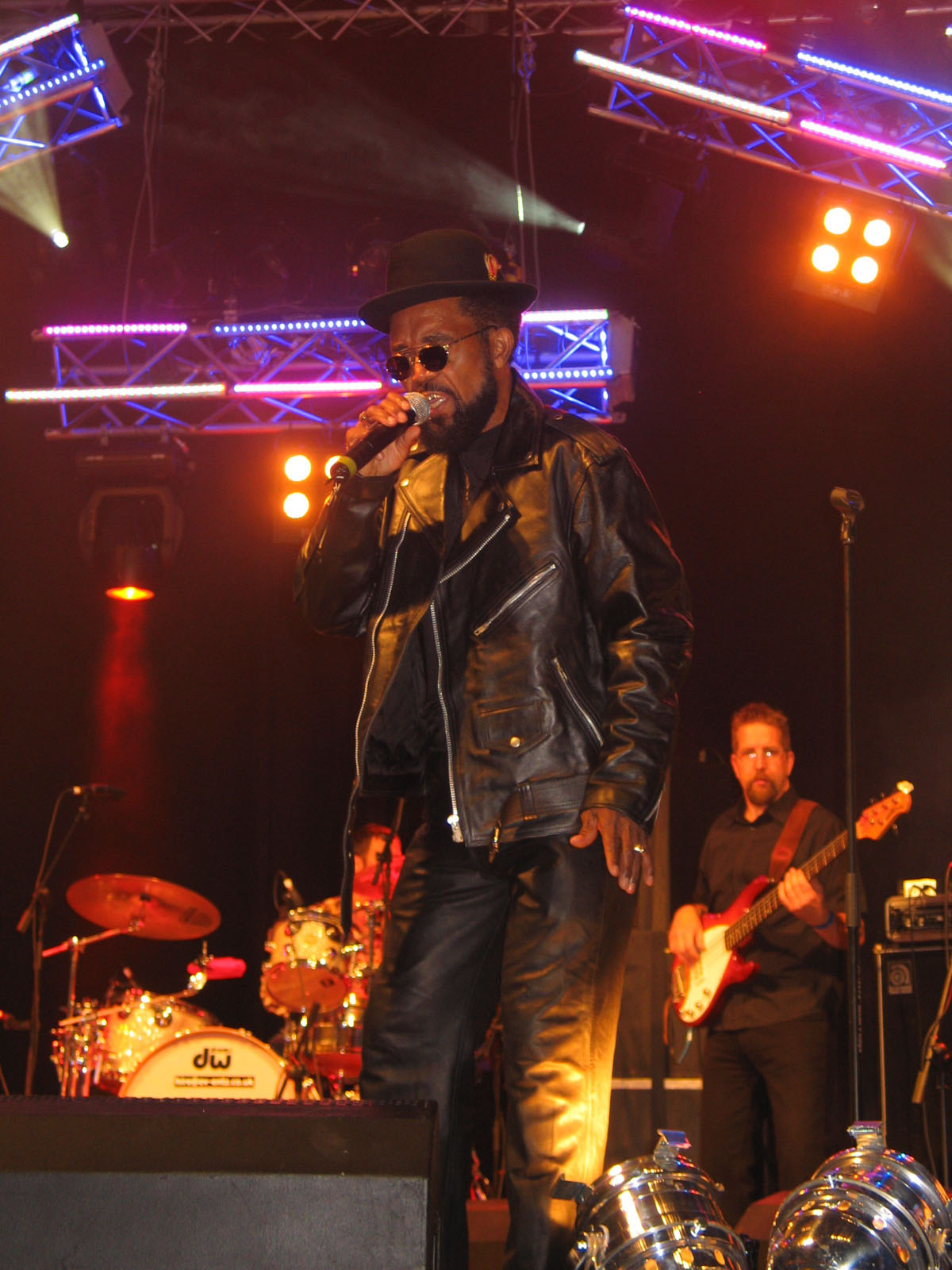
Prince Buster performing at the Cardiff Festival, Cardiff, UK

Rude boy is a subculture that originated from 1960s Jamaican street culture. In the late 1970s, there was a revival in England of the terms rude boy and rude girl, among other variations like rudeboy and rudebwoy, being used to describe fans of two-tone and ska. This revival of the subculture and term was partially the result of Jamaican immigration to the UK and the so-called "Windrush" generation. The use of these terms moved into the more contemporary ska punk movement as well. In the UK and especially Jamaica, the terms rude boy and rude girl are used in a way similar to gangsta, yardie, or badman.

== Jamaica ==
The term rude boy, and the rude boy subculture, arose from the poorer sections of Kingston, Jamaica, and was associated with violent discontented youths. Along with ska and rocksteady music, many rude boys favored sharp suits, thin ties, and pork pie or Trilby hats, showing an influence of the fashions of US jazz musicians and soul music artists. It is also believed that the rude boy style was influenced by Sean Connery's sharp, tight suits worn in his portrayal of James Bond, testified to by several ska songs that made reference to the fictional spy. Well-known cowboy and gangster/outlaw films from that period were also influential factors in shaping the rude boy image, as scholars like Rob Wilson, Christopher Leigh Connory, and Deborah A. Thomas have shown. In that time period, unemployed Jamaican youths sometimes found temporary employment from sound system operators to disrupt competitors' dances (leading to the term dancehall crasher). The violence that sometimes occurred at dances and its association with the rude boy lifestyle gave rise to a slew of releases by artists who addressed the rude boys directly with lyrics that either promoted or rejected rude boy violence, for example the 1967 song "Rudy a Message to You" by Dandy Livingstone.

Starting in the 1970s, Jamaican reggae music replaced the ska and rocksteady music associated with the rude boys. In the 1980s, dancehall became the main Jamaican popular music genre, drawing some parallels with the earlier rude boys in its culture and lyrical content.

== United Kingdom ==
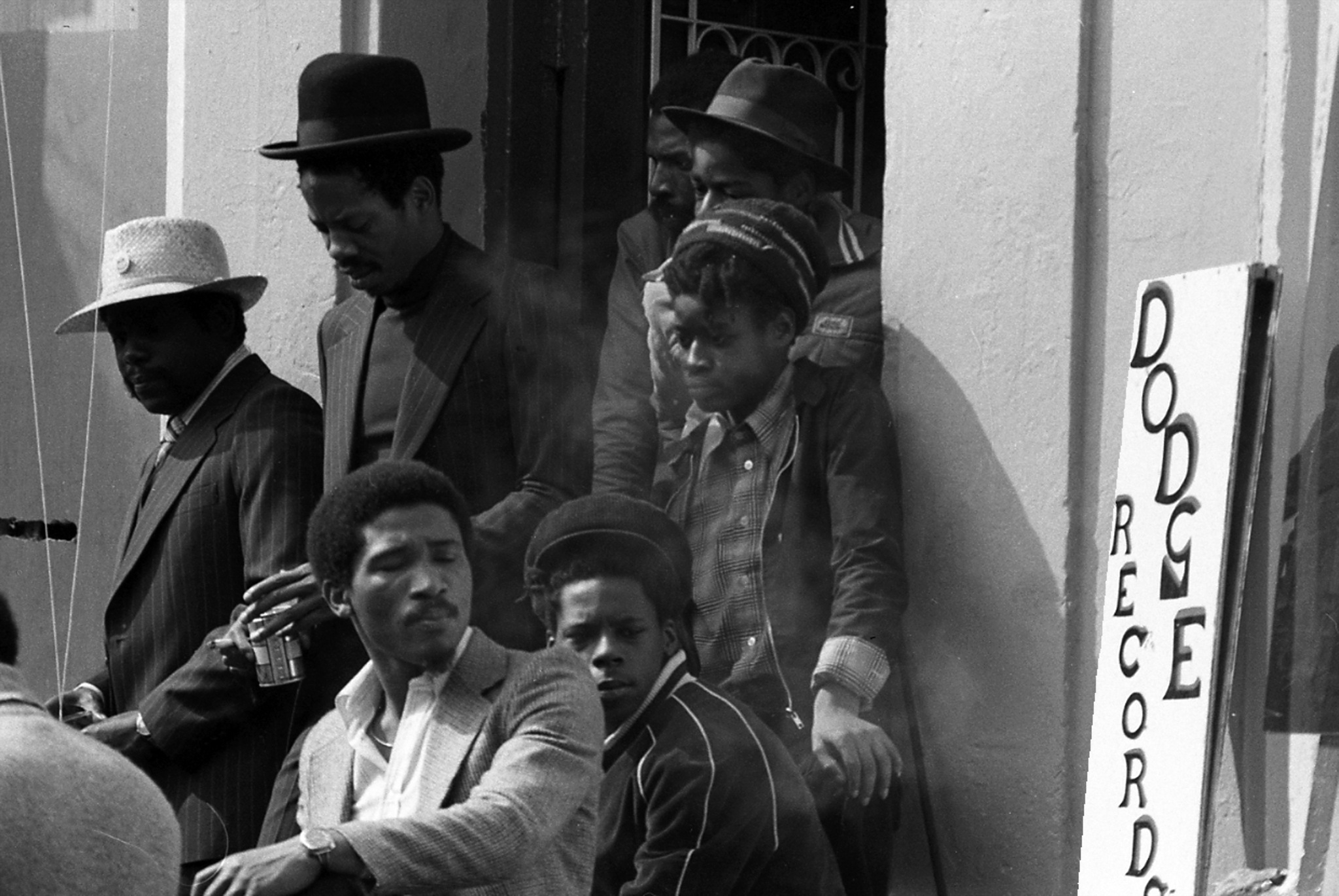
Rude Boys in Notting Hill, London (1974)

In the 1960s, the Jamaican diaspora introduced rude boy music and fashion to the United Kingdom, which influenced the mod and skinhead subcultures. In the late 1970s, the term rude boy and rude boy fashions came back into use after the 2 tone band the Specials (notably with a cover of "A Message to You Rudy") and their record label 2 Tone Records instigated a brief but influential ska revival. In this same spirit, the Clash contributed "Rudie Can't Fail" on their 1979 album London Calling, and The Ruts their 1980 single "Staring at the Rude Boys". In more recent times in multicultural Britain, the term rudeboy has become associated with street or urban culture, and is a common greeting. The term rudeboy has become associated with music genres such as ragga, jungle, drum and bass, UK garage, and grime – although is still used by many ska and ska punk bands, old and new – predominantly in the UK and USA.

== See also ==
- Jamaican posse
- Junglist
- Rhyging
- Rude Boy USA
- Skinhead
- Suedehead (subculture)
- Yardie
