= Denzil Dennis =

- Born: 13 October 1945 (age 80)
- Origin: Manchester, Jamaica
- Died: 11 July 2024
- Genre: Reggae
- Occupation: Musician
- Years active: 1960s–present
- Label: Supreme

Denzil Dennis (born 13 October 1945), aka Alan Martin, is a reggae singer from Jamaica who came to the UK in 1963.

== Biography ==
Dennis was born in Manchester, Jamaica in 1945. He recorded as a duo with Frank Cosmo in Jamaica in the early 1960s before moving to the UK where he began recording in 1963, under his own name and also under the alias Alan Martin, working with producers such as Laurel Aitken and Dandy Livingstone (as a member of the Brother Dan All Stars). He also recorded in duos with Pat Rhoden and Milton Hamilton (the latter as The Classics). He recorded "Civilization", an early roots reggae politically conscious single for Lee Scratch Perry released on The Upsetter label in combination with The Silvertones. He had recordings released on the Pama Supreme, Supreme, Trojan and Blue Beat labels. An anthology of his early recordings was issued in 2003 by Sanctuary Records.

== Discography ==
- Me Nah Worry: The Anthology (2003), Sanctuary
