= Europa Recordings =

UK europop record label; imprint of Universal-Island Records Ltd.

- Founded: 2006
- Founder: Matt Jagger
- Defunct: 2007
- Status: Defunct
- Genre: Europop
- Country of origin: United Kingdom

Europa Recordings was a British Europop record label established in 2006 by Matt Jagger. It was an imprint of Universal-Island Records, part of the Universal Music corporation.

Their first release "From Paris To Berlin" by Infernal was a number 2 hit in the British singles chart in May 2006. Europa was run in conjunction with the Apollo Recordings imprint, but both were closed down by Universal in 2007.
