= Apollo Recordings =

British dance music label

Apollo Recordings was a British dance music label established in 2005 by Matt Jagger. It was an imprint of Universal-Island Records, part of the Universal Music corporation.

Their first release "Thunder in My Heart Again" by Meck featuring Leo Sayer was a number one hit on the UK singles chart in February 2006. Apollo was run in conjunction with the Europa Recordings imprint, but both were closed down by Universal in 2007.
