= Surprise Records =

Record label subsidiary

- Parent company: Island Records

Surprise Records was a record label subsidiary of Island Records in the 1960s. It was known for its risqué releases.

== See also ==
- List of record labels
