= Sonny Roberts =

Jamaican record producer (1932–2021)

- Born: 1931; Spice Grove, Manchester Parish, Jamaica
- Died: March 17, 2021 (aged 89) Saint Andrew Parish, Jamaica
- Genres: Ska, gospel, Afrobeat, Soca, Lovers Rock
- Occupation: Record producer
- Years active: 1961–1990s
- Labels: Planetone, Sway, Tackle, Blessed, Affection,Sunburn, Orbitone

Sonny Roberts (July 26, 1931 – March 17, 2021), often known as Sonny Orbitone, was a Jamaican record producer who had success within the British ska, afrobeat, lovers rock and soca market in the 1960s, 1970s, 1980s and 1990s with his Planetone, Sway, Tackle Sunburn and Orbitone record labels.

Born in 1931 in Spice Grove, Manchester Parish, Roberts, who was originally a carpenter, emigrated to London in 1953. In 1961, he set up a recording studio in the basement of 108 Cambridge Road (a property owned by Trojan Records founder Lee Gopthal), the first Black recording studio in Britain owned by a Jamaican. He established the Planetone label (and later the Sway label), sharing premises with Island Records which provided distribution for the label, releasing ska records by artists such as Rico Rodriguez and also gospel records. Roberts was also indirectly responsible for the subsequent growth of Island Records in Britain and the birth of its Trojan subsidiary; Sonny being a crucial catalyst. ref name="Campbell" /> The studio and record label operated until the late 1960s. He also cut acetates, which he supplied to local sound systems.

In 1970, he opened a record shop Orbitone Records in Harlesden, London and started the Orbitone label, which was one of the key lovers rock labels, with releases by artists such as Tim Chandell, Teddy Davis, Martell Robinson, Judy Boucher and Joyce Bond, as well as producing and releasing Afrobeat music. Sonny produced and released the first U.K Afrobeat album in 1972 - Destruction by the Nkengas Nigerian music. After the successful release of the Nkengas album, Sonny produced and released other African artists such as the Rhythm Brothers, Peter King, Teddy Davis, and Gyedu-Blay Ambolley.

Roberts also ran the Lavender sound system in the 1960s.

In 1987, his production of Judy Boucher's "Can't Be with You Tonight" reached number two in the UK Singles Chart. This single holds the record for being the first Caribbean female singer to have the longest stay in the British national charts for 14 weeks. The hit record “ La Isla Bonita” by “global pop star” Madonna prevented Sonny from charting a No.1 record slot.

He returned to Jamaica in 1997, living in Saint Andrew Parish, where he ran a company producing natural mosquito repellent and natural spices.

Roberts died in Saint Andrew of throat cancer on 17 March 2021, aged 89.
