= Planetone =

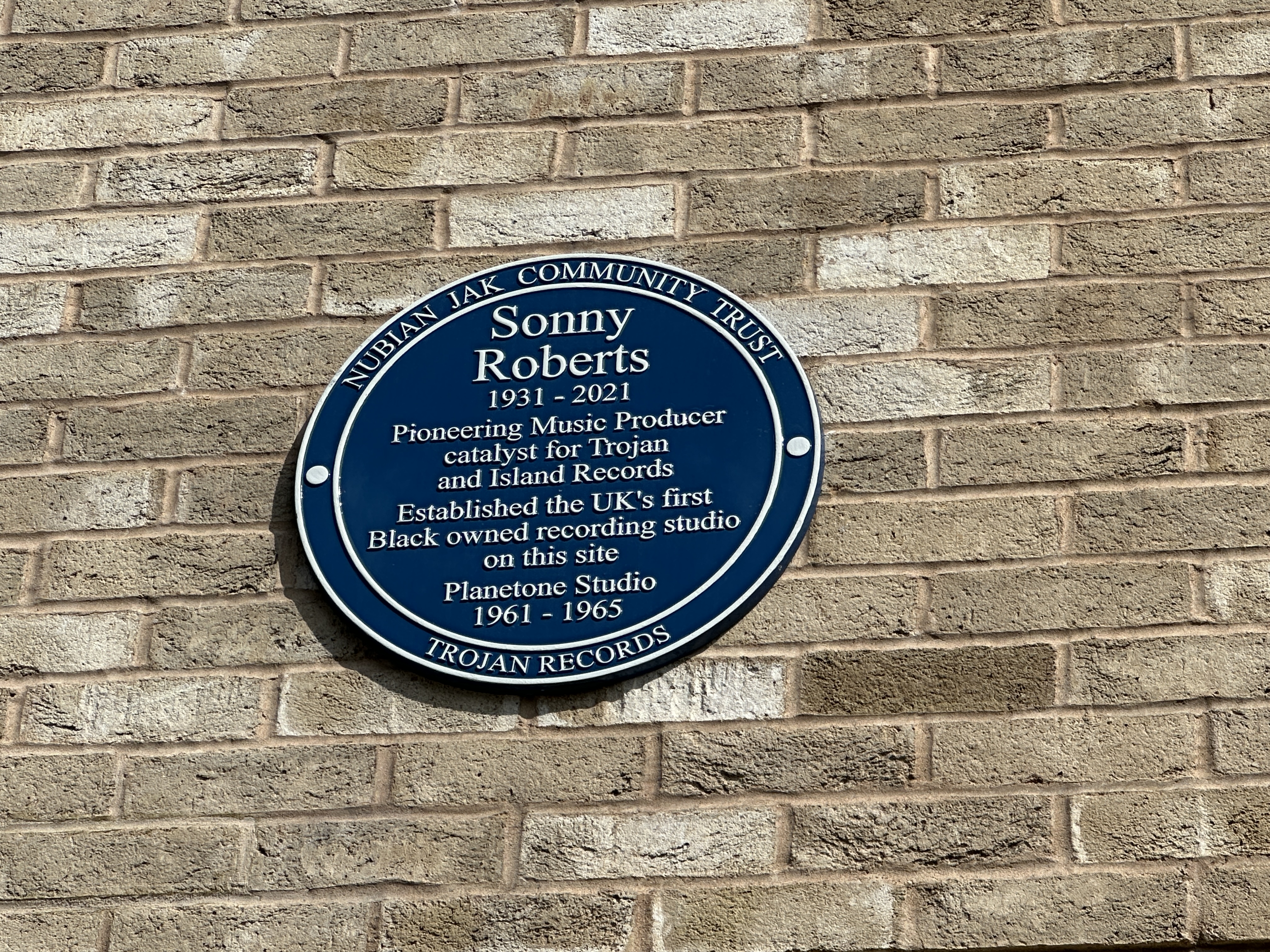
- Sonny Roberts plaque
- Founder: Sonny Roberts
- Genre: Ska
- Country of origin: United Kingdom
- Location: Kilburn, London

Planetone Studios was a London-based recording studio and independent record label that issued ska recordings in the early 1960s. It has been credited as the first black owned record label in England, and a catalyst for the later British labels Trojan and Island Records.

== History ==
The label's founder was Sonny Roberts (1932-2021). The basement studio, which operated from 1961 until 1965, was located at a now demolished site at 108 Cambridge Road, Kilburn, London. Some of the early recordings were by Rico's Combo, a group led by Jamaican trombonist Rico Rodriguez. Mike Elliott (future saxophonist for The Foundations), Jackie Foster, Tito ‘Sugar’ Simone and Jamaican singer Dandy Livingstone also released some recordings on the label. Other associated musicians included Jackie Edwards, Millie Small and The Marvels (band).

Chris Blackwell's Island Records took over the space in 1965 when Roberts returned to his original profession, carpentry.

== Orbitone ==
In 1970, Roberts opened the Orbitone record shop in Harlesden, stocking reggae, ska, calypso, Afrobeat, merengue and jazz. He also continued producing in rented studios: the album Destruction by Nigerian band Nkengas was produced by Roberts in 1973, an early example of UK Afrobeat. He licensed Arrow’s 1984 calypso hit Hot Hot Hot. And his production of Judy Boucher's Can't Be with You Tonight reached number two in the UK Singles Chart in 1987. Other musicians supported by Orbitone included Machel Montano, the soul singer Reuben Richards and the guitarist Ciyo Brown.

Roberts moved back to Jamaica in 1997. He died in 2021, survived by his wife Monica and daughters Cleon, Jackie and Andrett. A plaque was unveiled at the site of the Kilburn studio in 2017.
