= A Message to You Rudy =

1967 single by Dandy Livingstone

"Rudy a Message to You"

Single by Dandy Livingstone
- B-side: "Till Death Do Us Part"
- Released: July 1967
- Recorded: 1967
- Studio: Maximum Sounds Studio, Old Kent Road, London
- Genre: Rocksteady; ska
- Length: 2:48
- Label: Ska Beat
- Songwriter: Dandy Livingstone

Dandy Livingstone singles chronology
"One Scotch, One Bourbon, One Beer" (1967)	"Rudy a Message to You" (1967)	"Somewhere My Love" (1967)

"A Message to You Rudy" is a 1967 rocksteady song by Dandy Livingstone. Originally titled "Rudy a Message to You", the song later achieved broader success when, in 1979, a cover version by the Specials reached number 10 on the UK Singles Chart.

== Composition and recording ==
Livingstone came up with the idea of the song in about 10 minutes and recorded it a day or two later in about 20 minutes at Maximum Sounds Studio on Old Kent Road with engineer Vic Keary. Livingstone has said that he "had a very bad cold" on the day of recording and so it was suggested that he record the song as a guide vocal and then go over the vocals another day. However, everybody liked what Livingstone had done, so he didn't bother going back to sing over it. Whilst recording the song, Livingstone decided he wanted a trombone to feature in the song, so about a week after the recording session, he got trombonist Rico Rodriguez to play the intro melody. At the same time, he got a tenor saxophonist called Pepsi to play the same intro riff and "alternate the solo differently".

== Afterwards ==
"Rudy a Message to You" did have some success commercially, selling 30,000 units. It also peaked at number 9 on Record Mirror's Top R&B Singles chart in August 1967, in which it was listed as "Rudie Take a Message".

The lyrics warn a "rudy" (rude boy) to "think of [his] future" and change his ways, otherwise he will "wind up in jail". However, the reception was not what was intended and it was received as glorifying the rude boy culture.

Livingstone noticed that by 1969, there were three cover versions of "Rudy a Message to You", the first of which was by the Locomotive. He only found out about the Specials' version after seeing their performance on Top of the Pops, after which he made inquiries about the publishing. He found out Carlin Music was the publisher and they had been trying to find Livingstone's whereabouts. Livingstone was also contacted by Eddy Grant, who wanted to be the publisher of the song and gave him £250 in advance. However, Livingstone turned down the offer and signed with Carlin.

After the success of the Specials' version, Livingstone's version was re-released in December 1979 on Trojan Records, with the song remixed by Clem Bushay.

== The Specials version ==
"A Message to You Rudy"
- Cover of the single released in the Netherlands

Single by the Specials featuring Rico

from the album the Specials
- A-side: "Nite Klub"
- Released: 12 October 1979
- Recorded: 1979
- Studio: TW Studios, Fulham, London
- Genre: Rocksteady; 2-tone
- Length: 2:54
- Label: 2 Tone; Chrysalis
- Songwriter: Dandy Livingstone
- Producer: Elvis Costello

The Specials singles chronology
"Gangsters" / "The Selecter" (1979)	"Nite Klub" / "A Message to You Rudy" (1979)	"Too Much Too Young" (1980)

Rico singles chronology
"Children Of Sanchez" (1979)	"A Message to You Rudy" (1979)	"Sea Cruise" (1980)

English 2-tone/new wave band the Specials released their version in 1979 which also featured trombone by Rico Rodriguez with Dick Cuthell on trumpet. The recording was produced by Elvis Costello. It was a top 10 hit in the UK in November 1979, and also reached the top 30 in several other countries in Europe and in Australia and New Zealand in 1980. The Specials' version was sampled by Sublime in their song "DJ's".

=== Charts ===
Chart (1979)	Peak position
UK Singles (Official Charts)	10

Chart (1980)	Peak position
Australia (Kent Music Report)	29
Austria (Ö3 Austria Top 40)	7
Ireland (IRMA)	19
Netherlands (Dutch Top 40)	22
Netherlands (Single Top 100)	35
New Zealand (Recorded Music NZ)	29

=== Certifications ===
Region	Certification	Certified units/sales
New Zealand (RMNZ)	Gold	15,000^{‡}
United Kingdom (BPI)	Platinum	600,000^{‡}
^{‡} Sales+streaming figures based on certification alone.

== In popular culture ==
The song was featured prominently in the 1997 action/comedy Grosse Pointe Blank, the 2014 comedy-drama film Chef, and the 2019 sci-fi film Vivarium.

The song was featured in the post-credits scene of the 2019 film Spider-Man: Far From Home.
