= Lee Gopthal =

Jamaican-British record label owner (1938–1997)

- Born: Lehman Serikeesna Gopthal; 1 March 1938; Constant Spring, Jamaica
- Died: 29 August 1997 (aged 59); London, England
- Occupations: Record label owner, accountant
- Known for: Co-founding Trojan Records

Lehman Serikeesna Gopthal (1 March 1938 – 29 August 1997), known as Lee Gopthal, was a Jamaican-British record label owner and promoter, the co-founder of Trojan Records.

== Life and career ==
He was born in Constant Spring, Jamaica, into an Indian Jamaican family. His father, Sikarum Gopthal, came to Britain on the Empire Windrush in 1948, and Lee moved to Britain in 1952. In the late 1950s he bought a property in Maida Vale, part of which he leased to record producer Sonny Roberts, and trained as an accountant.

By the early 1960s, he was representing Jamaican record producer Leslie Kong in the UK. In 1963 he set up a distribution company, Beat & Commercial Records, later known as B&C. Among the Jamaican record labels distributed by Gopthal was Island Records, owned by Chris Blackwell, and in 1966 Gopthal and Blackwell established a retail shop, Musicland, in Willesden Green. Several additional Musicland shops opened between 1967 and 1970, mainly selling Jamaican records to the Afro-Caribbean community in Britain. Many of the shops, including one in Portobello Road, were rebranded as Muzik City in the early 1970s.

Gopthal also set up Pyramid Records and, in 1967, co-founded Trojan Records with Chris Blackwell. The Trojan Records label licensed a succession of Jamaican recordings supplied by producers such as Duke Reid, Clancy Eccles, Lee Perry, Harry J, and Leslie Kong. Gopthal achieved commercial success releasing chart singles including Desmond Dekker's 1969 hit "Israelites" (on Pyramid), as well as records by Dandy Livingstone, Harry J's Allstars, the Pioneers, and the Upsetters. Chris Blackwell left Trojan in 1972, and Gopthal sold the label in 1974. The Musicland and Muzik City stores closed by 1977. Gopthal continued to have limited involvement in the record industry until the late 1970s, when he returned to a career in insurance.

He died in 1997, aged 59. In 2020, he was posthumously recognised for his work by the Jamaica Reggae Industry Association (JaRIA).
