= Laurel Aitken =

Cuban-Jamaican musician (1927–2005)

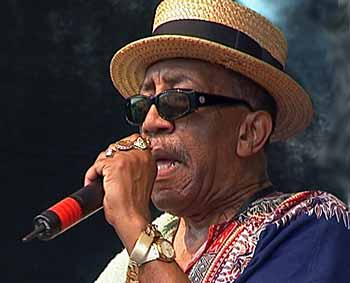
- Performing in 2000

Background information
- Born: Lorenzo Aitken; 22 April 1927; Havana, Cuba
- Died: 17 July 2005 (aged 78) Leicester, England
- Genres: Ska, rocksteady
- Occupation: Singer

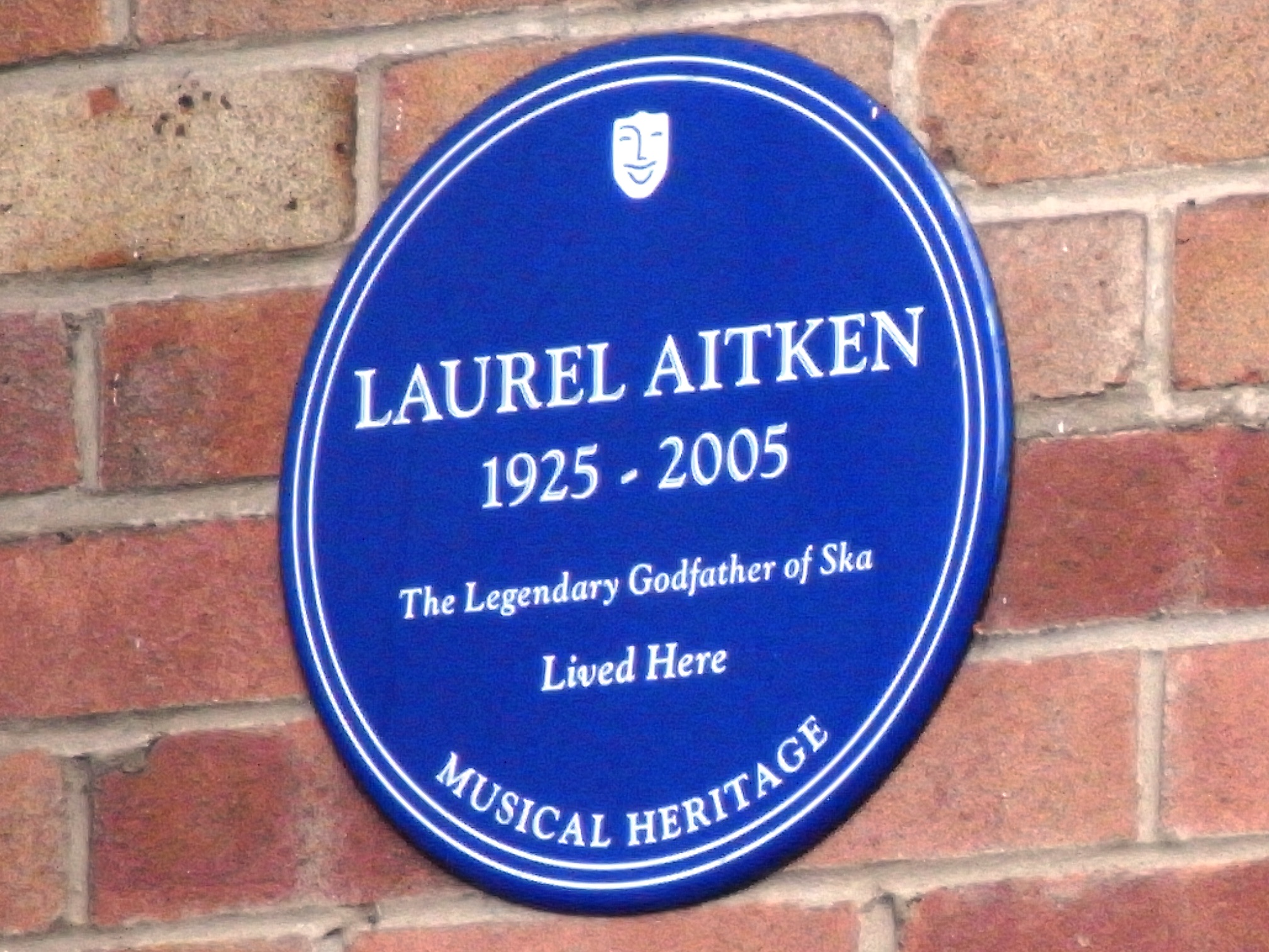
Laurel Aitken blue plaque at 22 Munnings Close, Leicester

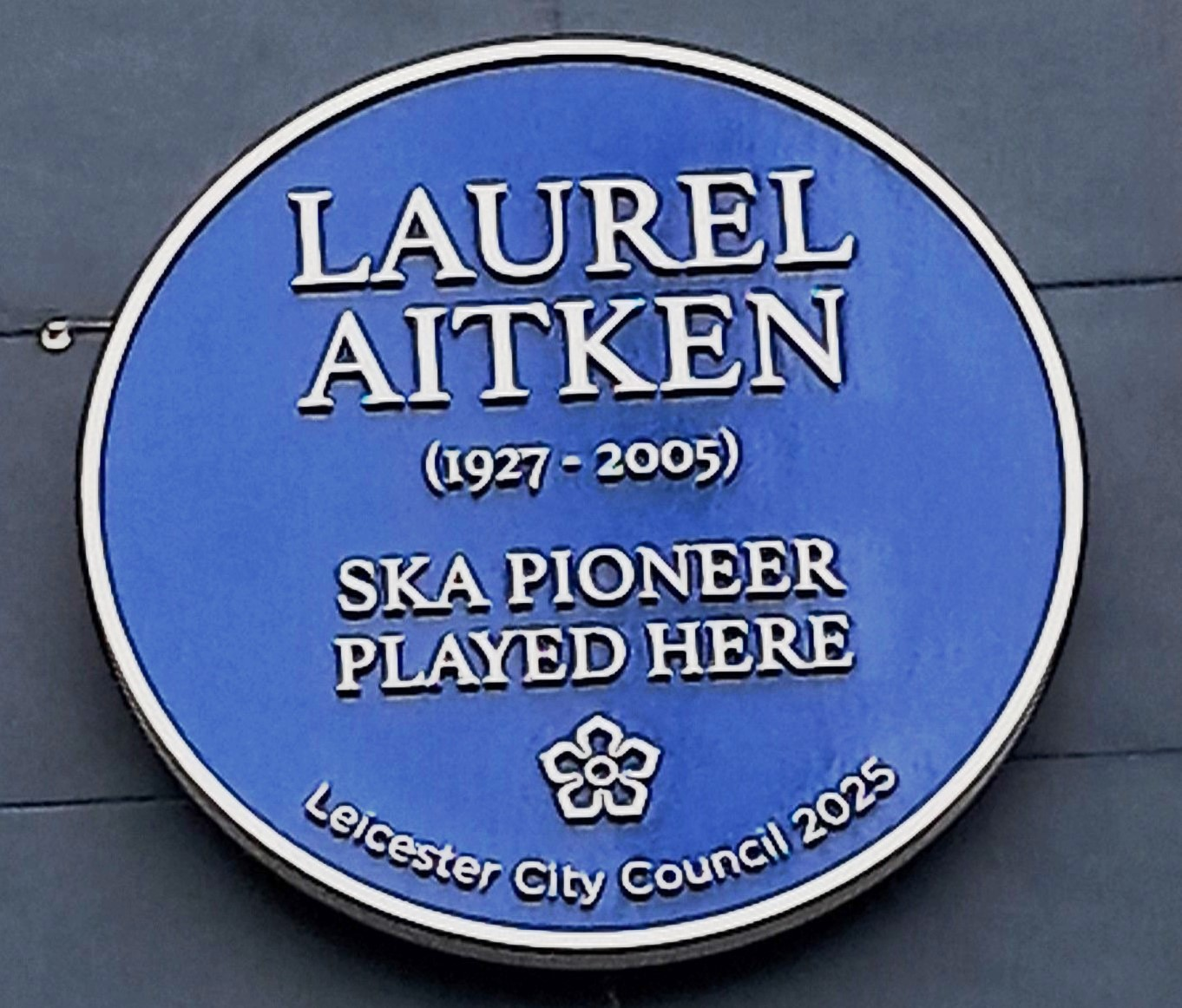
Laurel Aitken blue plaque at the Donkey public house, Welford Road, Leicester

Lorenzo "Laurel" Aitken (22 April 1927 – 17 July 2005) was a Cuban-Jamaican singer and one of the pioneers of ska music. He is often referred to as the "Godfather of Ska".

== Career ==
Born in Cuba of mixed Cuban and Jamaican descent, Aitken and his family settled in Jamaica in 1938. After an early career working for the Jamaican Tourist Board singing mento songs for visitors arriving at Kingston Harbour, he became a popular nightclub entertainer. His first recordings in the late 1950s were mento tunes such as "Nebuchnezer", "Sweet Chariot" (aka the gospel classic "Swing Low, Sweet Chariot") and "Baba Kill Me Goat". Aitken's 1959 single "Boogie in My Bones"/"Little Sheila" was one of the first records produced by Chris Blackwell and the first Jamaican popular music record to be released in the United Kingdom. Other more Jamaican rhythm and blues orientated singles from this period include "Low Down Dirty Girl" and "More Whisky" both produced by Duke Reid.

Aitken moved to Brixton, London, in 1960 and recorded for the Blue Beat label, releasing fifteen singles before returning to Jamaica in 1963. He recorded for Duke Reid, with backing from the Skatalites on tracks such as "Zion" and "Weary Wanderer", before returning to the UK, where he began working with Pama Records. He recorded hits such as "Fire in Mi Wire" and "Landlord and Tenants", which led to a wider recognition outside of Jamaica and the UK. This cemented his position as one of ska's leading artists and earned him the nicknames The Godfather of Ska, and later Boss Skinhead. He gained a loyal following not only among the West Indian community, but also among mods, skinheads and other ska fans. He had hit records in the United Kingdom and other countries in the 1950s through to the 1970s on labels such as Blue Beat, Pama, Trojan, Rio, Dr. Bird, Nu-Beat, Ska-Beat, Hot Lead and Dice. Some of his singles featured B-sides credited to his brother, guitarist Bobby Aitken. Aitken also recorded a few talk-over/deejay tracks under the guise of 'King Horror', such as "Loch Ness Monster", "Dracula, Prince of Darkness" and "The Hole". Aitken settled in Leicester with his wife in 1970. His output slowed in the 1970s and during this period he worked as an entertainer in nightclubs and restaurants in the area including the popular 'Costa Brava Restaurant' in Leicester under his real name Lorenzo. In 1980, with ska enjoying a resurgence in the wake of the 2 Tone movement, Aitken had his only success in the UK Singles Chart with "Rudi Got Married" (No. 60) released on I-Spy Records (the label created and managed by Secret Affair. Aitken's career took in mento/calypso, R&B, ska, rock steady, and reggae, and in the 1990s he even turned his talents to dancehall. He performed occasional concerts until his death from a heart attack in 2005. After a long campaign, a blue plaque in his honour was put up at his Leicester home in 2007. Punk band Rancid covered Aitken's "Everybody Suffering" on their 2014 LP Honor Is All We Know

== Discography ==
=== Albums ===
- The Original Cool Jamaican Ska (1964, Decca)
- Ska With Laurel (1965, Rio)
- Laurel Aitkin Says Fire (1967, Doctor Bird)
- Fire (1969)
- High Priest of Reggae (1969, Nu-Beat)
- The High Priest Of Reggae (1970)
- Laurel Aitken Meets Floyd Lloyd and the Potato Five (1987, Gaz's) (with The Potato 5)
- Early Days of Blue Beat, Ska and Reggae (1988, Bold Reprive)
- True Fact (1988, Rackit) (with The Potato 5)
- Ringo The Gringo (1989, Unicorn)
- It's Too Late (1989, Unicorn)
- Rise and Fall (1989, Unicorn)
- Sally Brown (1989, Unicorn)
- Ringo the Gringo (1990, Unicorn)
- Rasta Man Power (1992, ROIR)
- The Blue Beat Years (1996, Moon Ska)
- Rocksteady Party (1996, Blue Moon) (with The Potato 5)
- The Story So Far (1999, Grover)
- Woppi King (1997, Trybute)
- The Pama Years (1999, Grover)
- The Long Hot Summer (1999, Grover) (Laurel Aitken and The Skatalites)
- Clash of The Ska Titans (1999, Moon Ska) (Laurel Aitken versus The Skatalites)
- Pioneer of Jamaican Music (2000, Reggae Retro)
- Godfather of Ska (2000, Grover)
- Jamboree (2001, Grover)
- Rudi Got Married (2004, Grover)
- En Español (2004, Liquidator)
- Live at Club Ska (2004, Trojan)
- The Pioneer of Jamaican Music (2005, Reggae Retro)
- Super Star (2005, Liquidator)
- You’ve Got What It Takes/That’s How Strong (My Love Is) (2005 - Mini CD)
- The Very Last Concert (2007, Soulove) (CD + DVD)
- Love & Understanding (with The Mighty Megatons) (2026, Liquidator)

=== Singles ===
- "Nebuchanezzar/Sweet Chariot" (1958, Kalypso)
- "Low Down Dirty Girl" (1959, Duke Reid)
- "Drinkin' Whisky" (1960, Starlite)
- "Boogie Rock" (1960, Blue Beat)
- "Jeannie Is Back" (1960, Blue Beat)
- "Judgement Day" (1960, Blue Beat)
- "Railroad Track" (1960, Blue Beat)
- "More Whisky" (1960, Blue Beat)
- "Aitken's Boogie" (1960, Kalypso)
- "Baba Kill Me Goat" (1960, Kalypso)
- "Boogie In My Bones" (1960, Starlite)
- "Honey Girl" (1960, Starlite)
- "Bar Tender" (aka Hey Bartender) (1961, Blue Beat)
- "Bouncing Woman" (1961, Blue Beat)
- "Mighty Redeemer" (1961, Blue Beat)
- "Please Don't Leave Me" (1961, Blue Beat)
- "Mary Lee" (1961, Melodisc)
- "Love Me Baby" (1961, Starlite)
- "Stars Were Made" (1961 Starlite)
- "Brother David" (1962, Blue Beat)
- "Lucille" (1962, Blue Beat)
- "Sixty Days & Sixty Nights" (1962, Blue Beat)
- "Jenny Jenny" (1962, Blue Beat)
- "Mabel" (1962, Dice)
- "Lion of Judah" (1963, Black Swan)
- "The Saint" (1963, Black Swan)
- "Zion City" (1963, Blue Beat)
- "Little Girl" (1963, Blue Beat)
- "Oh Jean" (1963, Dice)
- "Sweet Jamaica" (1963, Dice)
- "Low Down Dirty Girl" (1963, Duke)
- "I Shall Remove" (1963, Island)
- "What a Weeping" (1963, Island)
- "In My Soul" (1963, Island)
- "Adam & Eve" (1963, Rio)
- "Mary" (1963, Rio)
- "Bad Minded Woman" (1963, Rio)
- "Devil or Angel" (1963, Rio)
- "Freedom Train" (1963, Rio)
- "This Great Day" (1964, Blue Beat)
- "West Indian Cricket Test" (1964, JNAC)
- "Pick Up Your Bundle" (1964, R&B)
- "Yes Indeed" (1964, R&B)
- "Bachelor Life" (1964, R&B)
- "Leave Me Standing" (1964, Rio)
- "John Saw Them Coming" (1964, Rio)
- "Rock of Ages" (1964, Rio)
- "Jamaica" (1965, Dice)
- "We Shall Overcome" (1965, Dice)
- "Mary Don't You Weep" (1965, Rio)
- "Mary Lou" (1965, Rio)
- "One More Time" (1965, Rio)
- "Let's Be Lovers" (1965, Rio)
- "Clementine" (1966, Blue Beat)
- "Don't Break Your Promises" (1966, Rainbow)
- "Voodoo Woman" (1966, Rainbow)
- "How Can I Forget You" (1966, Rio)
- "Baby Don't Do It" (1966, Rio)
- "We Shall Overcome" (1966, Rio)
- "Clap Your Hands" (1966, Rio)
- "Jumbie Jamboree" (1966, Ska-Beat)
- "Propaganda" (1966, Ska-Beat)
- "Green Banana" (1966, Ska-Beat)
- "Shame And Scandal" (1966, Blue Beat)
- "Rock Steady" (1967, Columbia Blue Beat)
- "I'm Still in Love With You Girl" (1967, Columbia Blue Beat)
- "Never You Hurt" (1967, Fab)
- "Sweet Precious Love" (1967, Rainbow)
- "Mr. Lee" (1968, Dr. Bird)
- "La La La (Means I Love You)" (1968, Dr. Bird)
- "For Sentimental Reasons" (1968, Fab)
- "Fire in Your Wire" (1969, Dr. Bird)
- "Rice & Peas" (1969, Dr. Bird)
- "Reggae Prayer" (1969, Dr. Bird)
- "The Rise & Fall of Laurel Aitken" (1969, Dr. Bird)
- "Haile Haile" (1969, Dr. Bird)
- "Carolina" (1969, Dr. Bird)
- "Think Me No Know" (1969, Junior)
- "Woppi King" (1969, Nu-Beat)
- "Suffering Still" (1969, Nu-Beat)
- "Haile Selassie" (1969, Nu-Beat)
- "Lawd Doctor" (1969, Nu-Beat)
- "Run Powell Run" (1969, Nu-Beat)
- "Save The Last Dance" (1969, Nu-Beat)
- "Don't Be Cruel" (1969, Nu-Beat)
- "Shoo Be Doo" (1969, Nu-Beat)
- "Landlords & Tenants" (1969, Nu-Beat)
- "Jesse James" (1969, Nu-Beat)
- "Pussy Price Gone Up" (1969, Nu-Beat)
- "Skinhead Train" (1969, Nu-Beat)
- "Donkey Man" (1969, Unity)
- "Pussy Got Thirteen Life" (1970, Ackee)
- "Sin Pon You" (1970, Ackee)
- "Moon Rock" (1970, Bamboo)
- "Skinhead Invasion" (1970, Nu-Beat)
- "I've Got Your Love" (1970, Nu-Beat)
- "Scandal in Brixton Market" (1970, Nu-Beat)
- "Nobody But Me" (1970, Nu-Beat)
- "I'll Never Love Any Girl" (1970, Nu-Beat)
- "Reggae Popcorn" (1970, Nu-Beat)
- "Baby I Need Your Loving" (1970, Nu-Beat)
- "Sex Machine" (1970, Nu-Beat)
- "Pachanga" (1970, Nu-Beat)
- "Mary's Boy Child" (1970, Pama)
- "Why Can't I Touch You" (1970, Pama Supreme)
- "Dancing with My Baby" (1971, Big Shot)
- "If It's Hell Below" (1971, Black Swan)
- "True Love" (1971, Nu-Beat)
- "I Can't Stop Loving You" (1971, Nu-Beat)
- "It's Too Late" (1971, Trojan)
- "Take Me in Your Arms" (1972, Big Shot)
- "Africa Arise" (1972, Camel)
- "Reggae Popcorn" (1972, Pama)
- "Never Be Anyone Else" 1974 (Hot Lead Records)
- "Fattie Bum Bum" (1975, Punch)
- "For Ever And Ever" (1977, DiP)
- "Rudi Got Married" (1980, I Spy) UK # 60
- "Big Fat Man" (1980, I Spy)
- "Mad About You" (1986, Gaz's)
- "Everybody Ska" (1989, Unicorn)
- "Skinhead" (1999, Grover)

=== Videos/DVDs ===
- Live at Gaz's Rockin' Blues (1989, Unicorn) (VHS)
- Laurel Aitken And Friends – Live at Club Ska (2005, Cherry Red) (DVD)
