= Island Records =

Multinational record label

- Parent company: Universal Music Group (1999–); Previously; PolyGram (1989–1998)
- Founded: 4 July 1959; 67 years ago
- Distributors: Republic (US); EMI/Island UK (UK); Universal Music Group (international); Island Def Jam (France); Island Philippines (Philippines); Metro-Goldwyn-Mayer (most of Island Pictures film library)
- Genre: Various
- Location: United States; United Kingdom; Jamaica
- Official website: islandrecords.com

Island Records is a multinational record label owned by Universal Music Group. It was founded in Jamaica by Chris Blackwell, Graeme Goodall, Leslie Kong and lawyer Michael Ernest David Chambers in 1959, and was eventually sold to PolyGram in 1989. Island and A&M Records, another label acquired by PolyGram, were both at the time the largest independent record labels in history, with Island having exerted a major influence on the progressive music scene in the United Kingdom in the early 1970s.

Island Records operates four international divisions: Island US, Island UK, Island Australia, and Island France (known as Vertigo France until 2014). Current key people include Imran Majid and Justin Eshak who were named co-CEOs of Island Records in 2021. Partially due to its significant legacy, Island remains one of UMG's pre-eminent record labels.

== History ==
=== Rise of the brand ===
Island Records was founded in Jamaica on 4 July 1959 by Chris Blackwell, Graeme Goodall and Leslie Kong, and financed by Stanley Borden from RKO. Its name was inspired by the Harry Belafonte song "Island in the Sun". Blackwell stated in 2009: "I loved music so much, I just wanted to get into it, or be as close to it as I could." Blackwell's first album was Lance Hayward at the Half Moon Hotel, which was recorded in late 1959.

Tom Hayes, the label's sales manager between 1965 and 1967, referred to the early period of the label in the UK as "organized chaos". The 1964 hit, "My Boy Lollipop", sung by Jamaican singer Millie Small (1947–2020), was the label's first success in the UK and led to a world tour that also involved Blackwell. In a 50th anniversary documentary, Blackwell stated that he was only interested in building long-term careers at that stage in time, rather than short-term projects. Suzette Newman has been a close colleague of Chris Blackwell's since working together in the early days of Island Records, and while there she ran the Mango world music label. Suzette Newman and Chris Salewicz were the editors for the book The Story of Island Records: Keep On Running.

Blackwell relocated to England in May 1962 to garner greater levels of attention after the local Jamaican sound systems proved to be overwhelmingly successful. The label was based at a now demolished basement in Kilburn, London Borough of Brent, in a property that was used by Sonny Roberts's Planetone label and whose landlord was Lee Gopthal who would later create Trojan Records. The vast majority of the artists who had signed to Blackwell's fledgling label while he was in Jamaica agreed to allow the musical entrepreneur to release their music in the UK. While in England, Blackwell travelled throughout the city carrying his stock with him and sold to record stores in the city. He did not provide any copies to radio stations, as they would not play any of the Island music; the music was also not reviewed by the press. Meanwhile, Goodall left to start the Doctor Bird record label in 1965.

Blackwell signed the Spencer Davis Group to the label (at that time, many Island releases were being distributed by Philips/Fontana). The group became very popular and Island started its own independent series to spotlight UK rock talent. They signed artists such as John Martyn, Fairport Convention, Free, and greatly influenced the growing FM radio market. By the late 1960s and early 1970s, it was a major label in England with artists including Roxy Music, King Crimson, Sparks, Traffic, the Wailers, Cat Stevens, Steve Winwood and many others. (In the US, many of its releases were licensed to A&M or United Artists until 1970, when it set up stateside distribution deals with Capitol, Warner and Atlantic, as well as independent distribution.)

For Toots and the Maytals, the group that introduced the term "reggae" in song with their 1968 single "Do the Reggay", Chris Blackwell was the one who decided on the line-up of the group before introducing them to an international audience. Blackwell had signed Bob Marley, and now Toots and the Maytals. In November 2016, Jackie Jackson described the formation of the group in a radio interview for Kool 97 FM Jamaica. Accompanied by Paul Douglas and Radcliffe "Dougie" Bryan in studio, Jackson explained:

We're all original members of Toots and the Maytals band. First it was Toots and the Maytals, three guys: Toots, Raleigh, and Jerry. ... And then they were signed to Island Records, Chris Blackwell. And we were their recording band. One day we were summoned to Chris' house. And he says, "Alright gentleman, I think it's time. This Toots and the Maytals looks like it's going to be a big thing". By this time he had already signed Bob (Marley). So in his camp, Island Records, there was Toots and the Maytals], the late Bob Marley; we were talking about reggae is going international now. We kept on meeting and he (Blackwell) decided that the backing band that back all of the songs, the recording band, should be the Maytals band. So everything came under Toots and the Maytals. So we became Maytals also. And then we hit the road in 1975 ... we were the opening act for the Eagles, Linda Ronstadt, and Jackson Browne. We were the opening act for The Who for about two weeks.

The logo of Island Records used from 1967 to 1970.

In 1969, Island Records acquired a deconsecrated 17th century church building at 8-10 Basing Street, in the Ladbroke Grove area of Notting Hill in West London. The building was refurbished to create the Island Studios recording studio, while also serving as the new location for Island Records' offices.

The first Toots and the Maytals album released and distributed by Chris Blackwell's Island Records was Funky Kingston. The Maytals had recently added a full-time backing band that included drummer Paul Douglas and bassist Jackie Jackson, and Chris Blackwell joined the group in the studio as a co-producer for the album. Music critic Lester Bangs described the album in Stereo Review as "perfection, the most exciting and diversified set of reggae tunes by a single artist yet released." As Blackwell says, "The Maytals were unlike anything else ... sensational, raw and dynamic." Blackwell had a strong commitment to Toots and the Maytals, saying: "I've known Toots longer than anybody – much longer than Bob (Bob Marley). Toots is one of the purest human beings I've met in my life, pure almost to a fault."

Despite the initial establishment work that Blackwell completed almost single-handedly, Island struggled as a business in the late 1970s and early 1980s. Bob Marley's 1981 death was detrimental to the label, especially after its having engineered Marley's international breakthrough only a few years earlier, while Irish rock band U2, which had signed to Island in March 1980, was growing in popularity, but had not yet reached the international superstar status that was to come. In 1981, Blackwell also used the label to finance a new film production and distribution company, producing the film Countryman. In 1982, Paul Morley and producer Trevor Horn started the ZTT label under the Island banner and Blackwell was known to approve excessive spending by the label. Morley recalls in a 2009 book about Island Records:

I eventually grew to appreciate how Chris Blackwell, and therefore Island Records, was not about one thing, or one style, or one system, or one way of doing things ... [I began] reflecting how the world functions and reinvents itself precisely because it is a fluid, sometimes dangerous, always exhilarating union of systems and beliefs and the best way of allowing the world to progress is to mix up and place in glorious conflict these various systems and beliefs.

In 1983, Island's film production division formed a partnership with Shep Gordon's Alive Enterprises to create Island Alive, which had success with films such as Kiss of the Spider Woman, Koyaanisqatsi, and Stop Making Sense. The partnership was dissolved in 1985. In August 1987, the company was not able to pay US$5 million that it owed to U2 in royalties for The Joshua Tree album, as it had diverted the funds to finance several unsuccessful films. U2 responded by negotiating a deal whereby they received a stake in the label that was estimated to be around 10 per cent.

The label's 4th & Broadway division, operating since the mid-1980s, achieved some success marketing alternative hip-hop and dance-pop music with artists such as Eric B. and Rakim and the Stereo MCs. Mango (Chaka Demus and Pliers) was another Island dance-oriented subsidiary, while it was singer Robert Palmer who achieved worldwide success with the rock song "Addicted to Love" in 1986. African musicians such as King Sunny Adé and Angélique Kidjo were also championed by Blackwell.

=== PolyGram acquisition ===
In July 1989, Blackwell sold Island Records and Island Music to the PolyGram UK Group for £180 million; he explained in 2009: "It became too big and too corporate for me and I couldn't really handle it." Following the sale, Island was no longer an independent company, but Blackwell was given a position on PolyGram's board and stayed on as CEO of PolyGram's new Island Entertainment division for ten years. PolyGram immediately began reissuing much of the Island back catalogue on compact disc and expanded Island's reach through its global manufacturing and distribution network, but the label was relatively unfocused in the 1990s. Between 1993 and 1995, Island had a sub-label called the Island Red Label, which focused on independent artists.

Blackwell eventually ended his association with the company in 1997, as the corporate life hindered the independent ethos of his personal life. "I never really had a job until I sold Island to PolyGram in 1989. It had gotten too corporate," he commented afterwards. After Blackwell left, PolyGram closed Island's film business. Blackwell left to found the Palm Pictures company and run a chain of boutique hotels in Miami, US and the Caribbean, including the very exclusive Goldeneye, once the Jamaican home of James Bond creator Ian Fleming. Then in May 1998, all of PolyGram and its associated labels were purchased by Seagram which announced its plan to integrate PolyGram with UMG to produce an estimated cost savings, within a couple of years, of between US$275 million and $300 million annually. Seagram further explained that the acquisition would unite a significant international presence with a thriving domestic business, as more than three-quarters of PolyGram's sales were outside the US.

=== Under Universal Music Group ===
In December 1998 and the first three months of 1999, UMG placed three divisions under the management of the Island brand: one in the UK, one in the US, and one in Germany. In each territory, these companies were merged under umbrella groups:

- In the UK, Island Records Group, now operating under Virgin EMI Records since 2013.
- In the US, Island, Mercury, and Def Jam and 14 other record labels were merged into The Island Def Jam Music Group; however, within the year, Island/Mercury decided to build upon the success of Def Jam Recordings and re-incorporated the label as Island Def Jam. On 1 April 2014, Universal Music announced the disbandment of IDJMG, one of four operational umbrella groups within Universal Music. Effective as of the same day of the announcement, Island Records, Def Jam, Mercury and Motown would later operate as autonomous record labels, until 2024, when UMG reunited all four labels under the Republic Records unit, Republic Corps.
- In Germany, Island and Mercury merged to become divisions of the Island Mercury Label group.

However, in 2001, UMG was merged with French company Vivendi S.A. to create Vivendi Universal S.A.; but the music company remains under the name Universal Music Group (UMG).

In the US, Island became a predominantly pop/rock label, as its urban artists were assigned to either Def Jam or Def Soul, a new Island/Def Jam R&B imprint. Following the takeover of Island by UMG, flagship band U2 were dissatisfied after chief Jason Iley moved to the Mercury label in the mid-2000s and signed with Mercury for the UK and Interscope Records for the US. However, successful artists such as Tricky and PJ Harvey were impressed by the label and signed on as artists. Tricky explained: "I knew I could get freedom. I knew I could do what I wanted to do.", while Harvey later stated:

I came to work with them, sort of fully formed—the way that I looked, the way that I sounded: that was already there. And I felt, like, that they just supported where that was going to go.

The label celebrated its 50th anniversary in 2009.

=== Island 50 ===
In 2009, Island Records marked the 50th anniversary of its foundation in Jamaica by Chris Blackwell with a series of live concerts and an exhibition under the Island 50 banner. The events were a celebration of the street-cool, independent outlook and striking visual imagery at the label's creative core. These festivities centred around a week-long run of shows at Shepherd's Bush Empire and Bush Hall in London. The concerts featured performances tracing the label's history from its reggae and jazz roots to the modern era. Among the artists who appeared were Sly & Robbie, Ernest Ranglin, Paul Weller, the I Threes, Aswad, Kid Creole & the Coconuts, Grace Jones, Steel Pulse, Keane, Tom Tom Club, Toots & the Maytals, the Mighty Diamonds, Yusuf Islam/ Cat Stevens, Bombay Bicycle Club, Baaba Maal and U2. Another Island 50 tribute event was held over four nights at the Montreux Jazz Festival in Switzerland, with Marianne Faithfull, Grace Jones and Sly & Robbie all appearing, and Chris Blackwell holding a Question & Answer session.

There was also a major exhibition at the Vinyl Factory Gallery in Soho, held in an open space beneath the record shop Phonica. The exhibition featured a display of treasured musical artefacts, including the Trabant car from the sleeve of U2's Achtung Baby, Nick Drake's guitar, the dress worn by Amy Winehouse at the 2008 Grammy Awards, the handwritten lyric sheet for Winehouse's song "Love Is a Losing Game" and Bob Marley's passport application form. The exhibition contained 800 prints showcasing the work for Island of the photographers Adrian Boot, Jean-Paul Goude, Anton Corbijn, Gered Mankowitz, Keith Morris and Brian Cooke, and the London exhibition also featured live performances at the Vinyl Factory Gallery by DJ Shadow and PJ Harvey.

=== Into Island's sixth decade: 2009–2017 ===
Following its 50th anniversary in 2009, Island Records entered its sixth decade on a tide of optimism. The years that followed saw fresh success for a number of established acts, including PJ Harvey, Keane, Paul Weller and Bombay Bicycle Club and an exciting wave of new signings. In its largest live production since its 2009 anniversary, the label also staged a concert by the Weeknd and Jack Garratt on Osea Island, a small island in Essex, as part of a bespoke one-day festival for 400 guests, including label staff, media and 200 fans who obtained tickets via a ballot. in this same year Island Records appointed Mark DiDia as the new executive vice-president and general manager of Island Records.

2016 proved a particularly successful year for the label in the UK: over a seven-week period between April and June, four separate Island acts spent at least one week at number one. The albums concerned were PJ Harvey's The Hope Six Demolition Project, Drake's Views (which spent two weeks at number one), Ariana Grande's Dangerous Woman and Catfish and the Bottlemen's The Ride.

==== Island's sixth decade: the artists ====
PJ Harvey's eighth studio album, 2011's Let England Shake, was one of the key records of Island's sixth decade. Made in a cliff-top church in Dorset, it won the 2011 Mercury Music Prize, making Harvey the only artist to land the prestigious award twice (she had prevailed ten years previously with Stories From The City, Stories From The Sea). Mumford & Sons, who grew out of a series of jam sessions in London in 2007, signed a licensing deal with Island in 2009. Heralded as standard bearers for a vibrant new wave of folkish, countrified rock, their debut album, Sigh No More, sold two million, reaching number two in Britain and America. It also won best British album at the BRIT Awards in February 2011. The follow-up, Babel, did even better in 2012, becoming the UK's fastest-selling album of that year, going to number one in Britain and the US and winning album of the year at the 2013 Grammy Awards. Island also secured the signing of English indie rock band Florence and the Machine whose debut studio album Lungs (2009) sold four million copies, and spent over 12 months on the UK Albums Chart before being crowned British Album Of The Year at the 2010 BRIT Awards ceremony. Lungs was followed by the studio albums Ceremonials (2011), and How Big, How Blue, How Beautiful (2015).

Keane were another of the big successes of Island's sixth decade. Having topped the charts with their five million-selling debut album Hopes and Fears in 2004, they went on to secure five consecutive number-one albums in the UK (a feat bettered only by The Beatles), with subsequent releases Under the Iron Sea (2006), Perfect Symmetry (2008), Night Train (2010) and Strangeland (2012) all topping the charts. Paul Weller's relationship with Island dates back to his fourth solo album, 1997's Heavy Soul, and its 2000 follow-up Heliocentric. He returned to the label in 2008 and began an outstanding trilogy of releases that contained some of his strongest solo work 22 Dreams (2008), the Mercury Music Prize-nominated Wake Up The Nation (2010) and Sonik Kicks (2012).

North London quartet Bombay Bicycle Club also released four albums on Island, with each one signalling a change of direction: the indie-rock of 2009's I Had The Blues But I Shook Them Loose paved the way for 2010's folkier Flaws, the modern rock of 2011's A Different Kind Of Fix and the broad-based invention of 2014's So Long, See You Tomorrow. Having built a loyal live following, Catfish & The Bottlemen signed to Island in 2014. After reaching platinum sales status in the UK with their Top Ten debut album, The Balcony, the Welsh rock band won the BBC Introducing Award at the first BBC Music Awards in 2014 and were crowned British Breakthrough Act at the BRIT Awards in 2016 (an award voted for by Radio 1 listeners). Their second album, 2016's The Ride, was a UK number one.

Island was also responsible for securing major British breakthroughs for two of the 21st century's biggest international superstars in Drake and the Weeknd. The success of Toronto hip-hop artist Drake came after the label had worked patiently to build his profile over a number of years, culminating in the success of his fourth album Views and its attendant singles in 2016. "One Dance", Drake's first number one single in the UK, had 1.95 million sales to become Britain's biggest-selling single of 2016. The single's 15-week run at number one equalled the mark for the second longest in UK chart history. With the Island-signed Mike Posner having held the number one spot with "I Took a Pill in Ibiza" for four consecutive weeks before being replaced by "One Dance", Island held the top spot in the UK singles chart for 19 consecutive weeks between March and August 2016. To crown a record-breaking year, Drake was named the world's best-selling recording artist of 2016 by international music industry organisation IFPI in February 2017.

Canadian singer and songwriter the Weeknd also cemented his position as one of the world's leading recording artists, with the 2016 success of his third album Starboy. Its success was the culmination of a strategy that had seen Island build his UK profile over a four-year period that dated from his 2013 studio album Kiss Land. Island's commitment to further nurturing the careers of global superstars was reiterated in June 2016 with the signing of Sean Paul. The Jamaican singer, rapper and songwriter released "No Lie" (featuring the Youngest English-Albanian Dua Lipa), his first single for Island, in November 2016.

Signed to Island via a licensing deal with independent label PMR, Disclosure were formed by two brothers from Reigate in Surrey, Guy and Howard Lawrence. The duo discovered the joys of nineties house, techno and two-step garage while studying music production at college, and went on to enjoy success with their two Island albums Settle (2013) and Caracal (2015), making extensive use of an array of guest vocalists including Sam Smith, Jamie Woon, Eliza Doolittle, Lorde and Gregory Porter. One of the acts who guested on Settle was AlunaGeorge, a boy-girl duo from London (singer Aluna Francis and musician and producer George Reid), who released their debut album, Body Music, on Island in 2013. Like Disclosure, Jessie Ware signed to Island through a link with independent label PMR. A soulful singer-songwriter from Brixton, Ware was nominated for the 2012 Mercury Music Prize with her smooth debut album, Devotion, and enjoyed further success with 2014's Tough Love. Another Island act to enjoy a significant breakthrough was Yorkshire singer John Newman, who topped the UK charts with his first solo single, "Love Me Again", and his debut album Tribute.

In May 2018, incumbent president David Massey left Island to join Sony Music Entertainment's relaunch of Arista Records. Darcus Beese, OBE took on the role of president upon Massey's departure. To make the transition, Beese relocated from the United Kingdom to Island's offices at Universal Music Group's New York City building.

=== Seventh decade and further expansions: 2019–present ===
On 23 July 2020, Universal Music Group and its local subsidiary MCA Music launched Island Records Philippines, the first Southeast Asian branch of the 61-year old label. The Philippines branch is led by former Sony Music Philippines and Sindikato Management executive Enzo Valdez. In June 2021, Imran Majid and Justin Eshak were named co-CEOs of Island Records. They assumed the position on 1 January 2022.

In 2021, Island signed the American singer Sabrina Carpenter. She released her first single under the label, "Skin", on 22 January 2021. The song peaked at number 48 and 33 on the Billboard Hot 100 and the Billboard Global 200, becoming her first entry on both charts. Since signing with the label, she has gone on to have a major worldwide breakthrough, releasing three hit albums: Emails I Can't Send (2022), Short n' Sweet (2024) and Man's Best Friend (2025).

== Manga Entertainment ==
Island World Communications, under the leadership of Blackwell and Andy Frain, created Manga Entertainment Ltd, the anime and live action Japanese film division of Island in 1991. and the distribution of what was the label's first release is considered a crucial milestone in the establishment of anime in the UK. In 1994, Island sold the distribution licences for most of Manga's releases to Siren Entertainment, an independent entertainment company in Australia. Those rights were then given to Madman Entertainment in 1999 when Siren became solely an acquisitions company.

== Subsidiaries and labels ==
This list is probably incomplete, and some of the dates are uncertain.

- Antilles Records (1972–1998)
- Apollo Recordings (2006–2007)
- Black Swan Records (UK) (1963–1965 and mid-1970s)
- Dublekick Company (2010–present)
- Europa Recordings (2006–2007)
- EmArcy Records (2014–present)
- 4th & Broadway (1983–1998, 2014–present)
- Gee Street Records (1990–1997)
- Island Masters (1980s–1990s; reissues)
- Island Records Australia (2007–present)
- Island Reggae Greats (1985, compilation series; re-issued in several forms)
- Island Trading Company (US holding distributor under PolyGram; 1983–1989)
- Manga Entertainment (1991–1997, moved to Chris Blackwell's Palm Pictures, then was sold to Starz Media)
- Mango Records (1972–1997)
- Mercury Records (2014–2015)
- MonarC Entertainment (2002, founded by Mariah Carey)
- Modhaus (2021–present)
- Safehouse Records (2015–2018, founded by Demi Lovato, Nick Jonas, and Phil Mclntyre)
- Smash Records (1994–1999)
- So So Def Recordings (2007–2009, founded by Jermaine Dupri)
- Springtime! (1981–1985)
- Stiff Records (1984–1986 only)
- Stolen Transmission (2005−2007, remained independent until 2008)
- Sue Records (1963–68)
- Supreme Recordings
- Surprise Records (mid-1960s, later known as Sportdisc)
- TAG Records (2008–2009)
- Teen Island (2008–2011)
- Trojan Records (1967–1968 only)
- Tuff Gong (1970–present, founded by Bob Marley)
- Witchseason Productions (Joe Boyd)

== Publications ==
- Hard Rope & Silken Twine (1974), written by The Incredible String Band, illustrated by Wayne Anderson
