= Tito Simon =

Jamaican reggae singer and producer (born 1940)

- Also known as: Sugar Simone, Sugar, Lance Hannibal
- Born: Keith Foster; 1948 (age 77–78)
- Origin: St Mary's, Jamaica
- Genres: Reggae
- Labels: Planetone, Trojan Records

Tito Simon (born Keith Foster in 1948, St Mary's, Jamaica) is a Jamaican reggae singer and producer.

Simon appeared with Dandy Livingstone as one half of Sugar & Dandy. He later collaborated with Clancy Eccles, recording hit songs including, "Easy Come Easy Go", "You Can’t Be Serious", "I’ll Be True To You", and "She Aint Nothing But The Real Thing". He had solo success with tunes such as "This Monday Morning Feeling" which he wrote and produced. The song reached No. 45 in the UK Singles Chart in February 1975.
