= Rude Boy USA =

Novel series by Victoria Bolton

- Author: Victoria Bolton
- Cover artist: Victoria Bolton
- Language: English
- Genre: Crime fiction
- Publisher: Hairummat Books
- Publication date: 25 December 2015
- Publication place: USA
- ISBN: 9781518754333
- OCLC: 940964203
- Website: authorvictoriabolton.com

Rude Boy USA is a series of three crime fiction novels written by the American novelist Victoria Bolton. The series is set in New York City and Jamaica and follows characters, Bernie “Banks” Rhodos, Celia “Bunny” Jones, John LeBlanc, Ben Berardi, and Jerome Dexter-Dixon.

The novels in the trilogy are titled Rude Boy USA (2015), BunnyWine (2016), and The Tide is High (2016). Rude Boy USA series is an organized crime tale set in New York City beginning in the late 1960s, that follows a multi-cultural group of mobsters. The series spans over two decades ending in the early 1990s at the conclusion of The Tide is High.

== Plot ==
Mob boss Bernie Banks and his associates—John Leblanc, Ben Berardi, and Jerome Dexter-Dixon are two white and two black men who style themselves after the Rude Boy culture made famous in Jamaica. Operating as a shell investment company supported by illegal activities, the Chimera Group hopes to become as powerful as other crime families and gain respect from the Cosa Nostra. They face internal strife when one of the associates begins dating a former Playboy Club waitress Celia Jones who joins the group through questionable circumstances. Her old occupation follows her into the group by her name, Bunny. Their efforts and push for power also draw the attention of rival Ambrosino family which puts the two groups into a war. In BunnyWine, Bunny (Celia) and John transition out of mob life and rebrands Chimera into a reputable company and attempt to break into politics but is derailed by his former partner in crime Ben Berardi and ambitious New York City prosecutor Mario Pasquale. In the Tide is High, after John's imprisonment and trial he runs for mayor of New York but finds that Mario Pasquale has the same goals as him. Mario pulls all of the stops to derail John's campaign.

== Rude Boy USA ==
Mob boss Bernie Banks and his associates—John, Ben, and Jerome—differ from your ordinary Sicilian and Irish mob families. Two white, two black, they style themselves after the Rude Boy culture made popular in Jamaica.

Operating as a shell investment company supported by illegal activities, the Chimera Group hopes to become as powerful as other crime families and gain respect from the Cosa Nostra. Bernie, a war veteran of Jewish and Greek descent, begins his business in his apartment and grows it into a multimillion-dollar empire. He and his crew resemble a more sophisticated subculture of urban street gangsters with their Ray-Ban sunglasses, loafers, and debonair style. But they want fear and admiration. Their efforts draw the attention of the rival Ambrosino family, and they face internal strife when one of the associates begins dating a former New York City Playboy Club waitress who wants in on the group.

== BunnyWine ==
John, who creates a wine based on Playboy Club Celia “Bunny” Jones's rise to crescendo, moves to Jamaica and marries Bunny after their company becomes successful. He gives up his life as a mob boss to become a respectable businessman and market BunnyWine as Bunny adjusts to not getting the life of a gangster's wife she was expecting.

John may be gone but he's not forgotten, and ambitious criminal prosecutor Mario Pasquale, whose goal is to rid New York City of the mob, strikes a deal with jailed Chimera member Ben Berardi to let him out of jail in exchange for any information he can get on John. But when Ben falls into old and dangerous habits, the body count starts to rise.

== The Tide Is High ==
John and Bunny LeBlanc upon their return to his hometown of New York City, where John has big plans on the political scene. The Chimera group has been resurrected with John at its head, and the Dixon-Rhodos Foundation is alive and well.

However, among those who dare stand in the way of the infamous John LeBlanc and his friends is the prosecutor who tried John for murder and lost—Mario Pasquale. Mario, John's opponent in the race to become mayor of New York, realizes the public has taken a shine to John—to an extent Mario hadn't anticipated. In light of this disturbing development, Mario decides to fight a little dirty.

In a quietly engineered backroom deal, he enlists the help of up-and-coming journalist Paul Aaron, an ambitious man seeking to build his professional reputation on exposing the criminal underpinnings of the Chimera group. After all, who would want a former mobster for mayor?

Then again—crossing John could cost the duo much more than an election and a sensational news scoop.

== Structure ==
Rude Boy USA consists of fifteen chapters. BunnyWine and The Tide is High consists of ten chapters each.

== Critical reception ==
Kirkus Reviews noted that Bolton aptly captures the tempestuous spirit of the time–a volatile brew of political radicalism, crime, racial tension, and sexual libertinism–and her painstaking historical research is evident on virtually every page. The Huffington Post described the Rude Boy USA series as life in New York City in the early 1970s "in so much detail that you feel as if you were there with the characters".

Rude Boy USA has received the bronze medal in the Readers’ Favorite 2016 book awards in the Drama category.

Rude Boy USA has also won the Pacific Book Award for Best Crime.

== Film adaptations ==
Screenwriter Doug Klozzer has completed a full feature film treatment for the first book in the series Rude Boy USA.
