= Harlesden =

District in London, England

Coordinates: 51.536°N 0.248°W

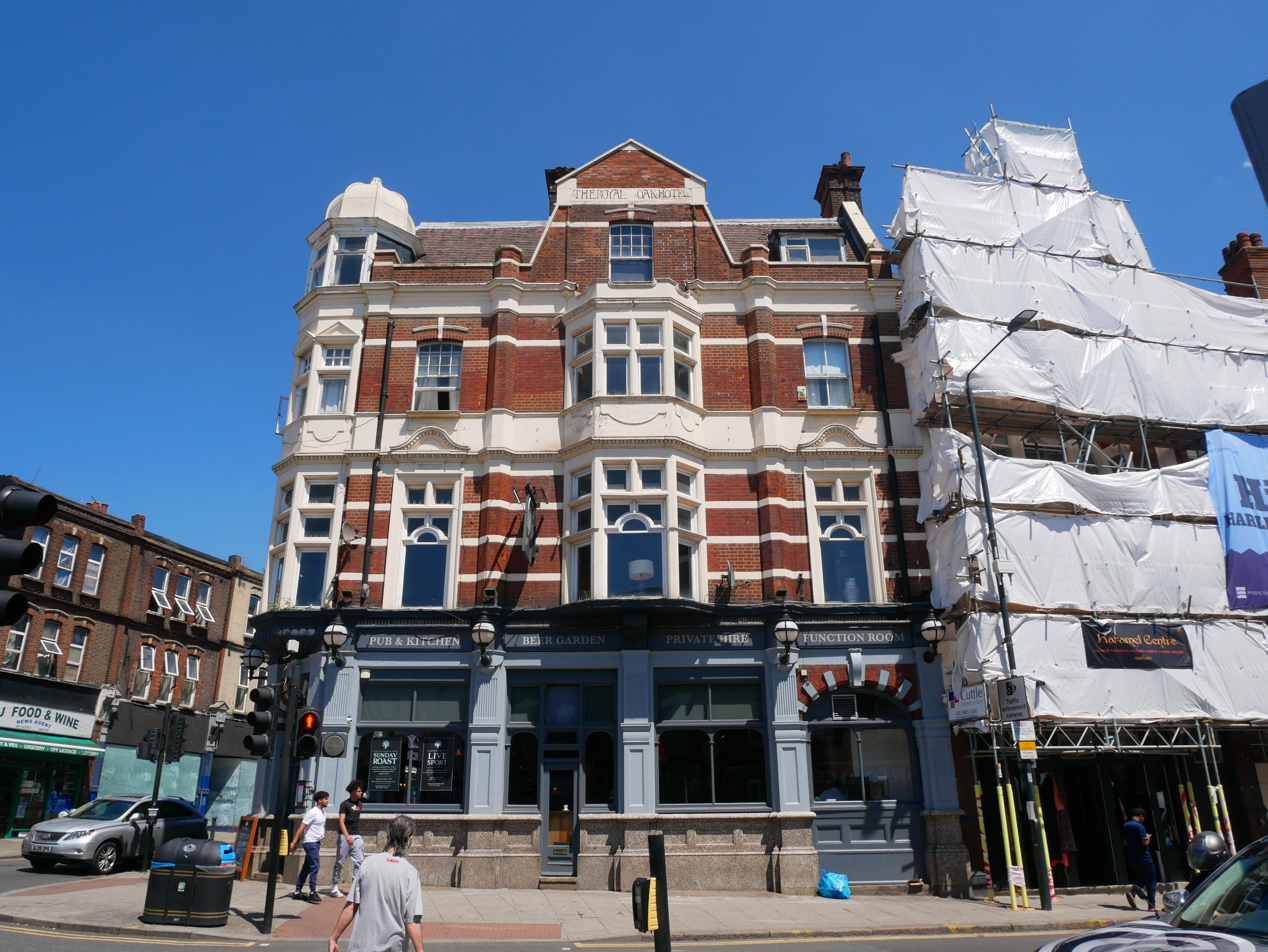
- The Royal Oak, High Street/Park Parade

- Location within Greater London
- Population: 17,162 (Harlesden ward 2011)
- OS grid reference: TQ215835
- London borough: Brent
- Ceremonial county: Greater London
- Region: London
- Country: England
- Sovereign state: United Kingdom
- Post town: LONDON
- Postcode district: NW10
- Dialling code: 020
- Police: Metropolitan
- Fire: London
- Ambulance: London
- UK Parliament: Queen's Park and Maida Vale
- London Assembly: Brent and Harrow

Harlesden /ˈhɑːrlzdən/ is a district in the London Borough of Brent, situated just north of Old Oak Common and the Grand Union Canal.

Harlesden was historically in the Municipal Borough of Willesden before the creation of Brent; it lies within Willesden's postal district of NW10. Harlesden has been praised for its vibrant Caribbean culture and unofficially named London's reggae capital for its contributions to the musical genre. The town centre contains a large number of multicultural independent businesses, while industry exists by the canal, most notably a McVitie's biscuit factory that has been operating since 1902. The population includes people of Afro-Caribbean heritage, as well as Brazilian, Somali and smaller Latin American, and East African groups within the community.

== History ==
Harlesden was once a Saxon settlement. The Domesday Book calls it "Hervlvestvne". For centuries the area was a small rural community set in orchards with some inns.

In the 19th century, Harlesden, then a rural village in the parish of Willesden, began to develop some of its urban appearance with the arrival of the railways. Willesden Junction, Kensal Green and Harlesden stations on the London & Birmingham Railway all had an effect on the developing village. Cottages for railway and industrial workers were built, as was grander housing for the local middle class. The London–Harrow coach passed through the village every day by 1839. The village gained a blacksmith, grocer and a shoemaker during this period.

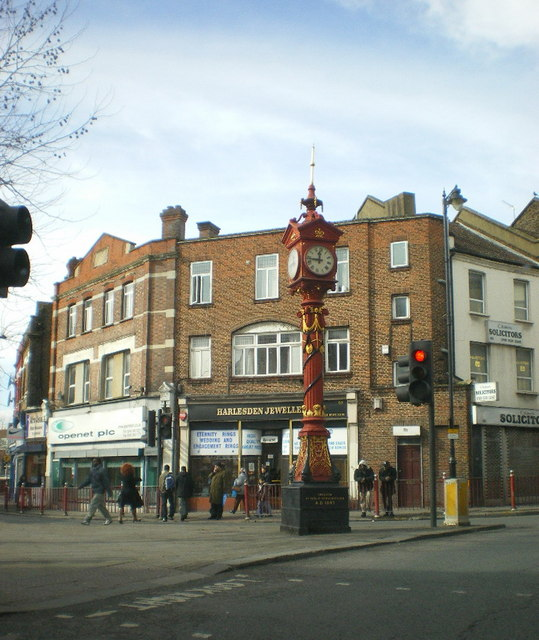
Jubilee Clock on High Street

Harlesden increasingly lost its rural nature, with factories replacing farms and woodland. Sewerage arrived here in 1871 and soon houses were being built. A mainly middle class population resided here who enjoyed the availability of numerous churches, cinemas, a court, a library and recreational pleasure at Roundwood Park. From late Victorian times until the 1930s, housing completed its spread across the area, and Harlesden became part of the London conurbation. A jubilee clock tower was built in 1888. As well as train links, Harlesden had a frequent horse-drawn omnibus service to Paddington as early as 1890, with Electric trams caming to Harlesden in 1907. That year also saw the opening of Willesden Hippodrome Theatre, which was destroyed by German bombing in 1940. Much of the working class in Harlesden suffered from poverty, with the Willesden Chronicle mentioning "nearness to starvation" of those people in 1908.

In 1908, the Olympic Games were held in London. The marathon race course went through Harlesden, and ended at the White City Stadium. The course entered Harlesden via Craven Park Road, turned down Manor Park Road, down the High Street and passed the Jubilee Clock. After that, the course headed towards North Acton via Station Road and passing Willesden Junction.

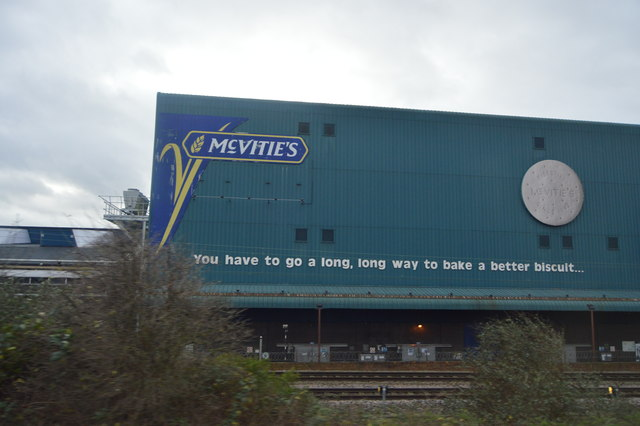
McVitie's factory in Harlesden

Mainly after World War I, one of Europe's biggest industrial estates was constructed at nearby Park Royal, and large factories there and within Harlesden included McVitie & Price (later United Biscuits) from 1910, and Heinz from 1919. Industrial growth led to a middle class exodus as Harlesden turned entirely into a working class area in the inter-war period. The McVitie & Price factory became the largest biscuit factory in the western world, employing 2,600 people by 1978.

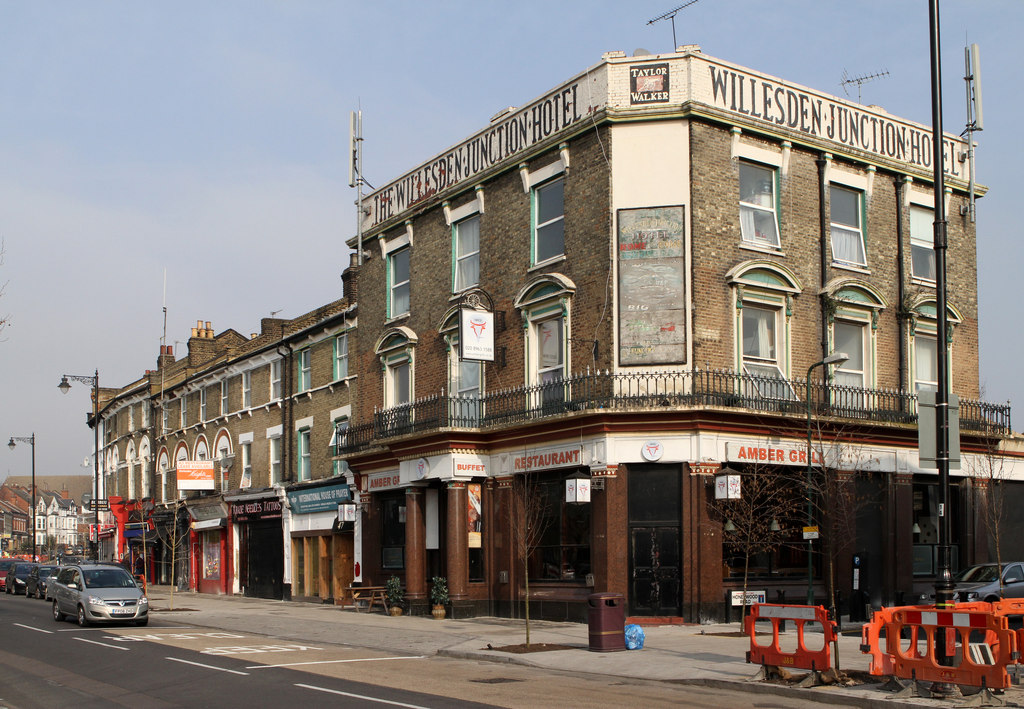
Former Willesden Junction Hotel on Station Road

By 1939 the last of the really large Victorian houses, Roundwood House and Knowles Tower, had both been demolished by Willesden Council. At 6am on 16 January 1939, the Irish Republican Army blew up the Harlesden electricity cable bridge. The bridge crossed the Grand Junction Canal, and carried the power line from Battersea Power Station. No one was injured in the attack. In the interwar period, a cargo ship, built on Tyneside, was named after the area. In 1941, the ship was sunk by the German battle cruiser Gneisenau, approximately 600 miles west of Newfoundland. Seven members of the crew were killed.

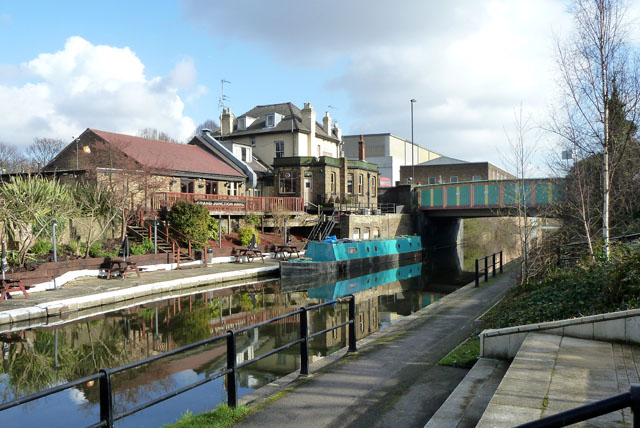
The Grand Union Canal in Harlesden, in the background is the Grand Junction Arms inn

In the 1950s, the transport of coal from Durham and steel from Sheffield became a main contributor to the local economy, these industries employed a mass of labour from Irish and Jamaican immigrants.

The image of Harlesden today began to take shape in the 1950s, 1960s and 1970s. Continued immigration from Ireland and new immigration from the Caribbean and the Indian sub-continent changed the racial and cultural make up of the area. Despite the immigration the population of Harlesden still declined from 39,527 in 1951 to 26,970 in 1971, but remained densely populated. Prefab homes for those made homeless by Second World War bombings were still in existence by the end of the 1960s.

By the 1960s, the Curzon Crescent estate was known for poverty and became a vandalism hotspot. At the same time, immigration from the West Indies and Indian sub-continent led to racist articles in a national newspaper. Poverty increased further by the decline of industry and the building of Brent Cross Shopping Centre. Steps were taken to improve the area, such as the Harlesden City Challenge community project in the 1990s that involved the creation of public artwork in the area, as well as the renovation of the jubilee clock on the High Street in 1997. More recently from the end of the 20th century the area has become home to Brazilian, Portuguese and Somali communities, as well as Polish, Afghan and Colombian communities.

Prince Charles visited Harlesden in March 2007. He commented "I don't think I have enjoyed myself so much for a long time going down the high street and popping into one or two shops. I'm sorry I couldn't go into more of them."

In the late 2010s, reduced crime rates led to higher house prices, but the district retains a non-gentrified atmosphere. In 2015 a new community "Town Garden" was opened for locals to garden, socialise and exercise, established by the funding of local volunteers and charities. It has become a green sanctuary in the heart of Harlesden.

== Amenities ==
The diversity of Harlesden is apparent in the high street which houses various businesses such as the likes of Afro-Caribbean hair and beauty shops, Somali restaurants, Portuguese bakeries and Brazilian cafes.

=== All Souls church ===
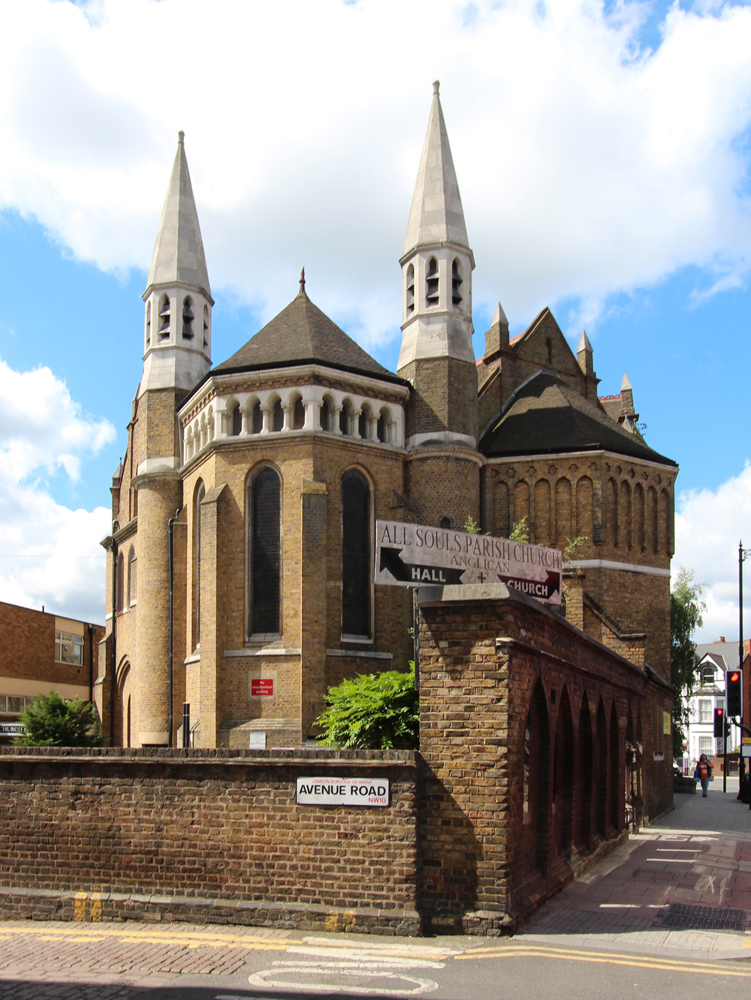
All Souls, Harlesden

The Church of All Souls is on Station Road in Harlesden. It was designed in 1879 by E.J. Tarver and is a Grade II* listed building.

=== Jubilee Clock ===
Harlesden's jubilee clock was erected in 1888 which commemorates Queen Victoria's Golden Jubilee.

=== Roundwood Park ===
Roundwood Park is the main public open space and park in Harlesden.

=== Willesden County Court ===
Located on Acton Lane, the current Willesden County Court was built in 1970.

=== Our Lady of Willesden ===
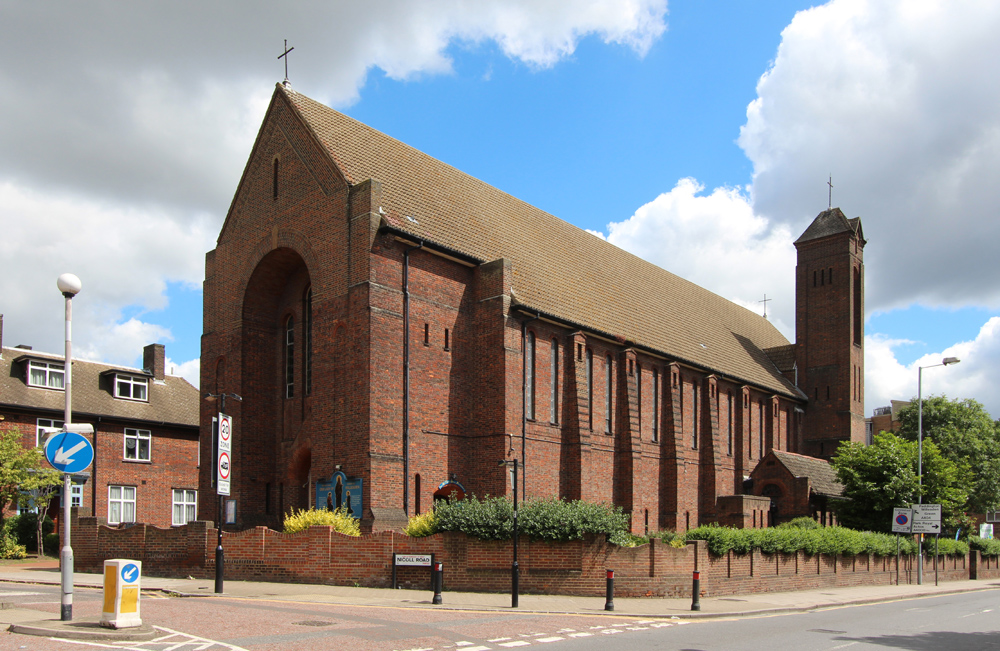
Our Lady of Willesden, Harlesden

Our Lady of Willesden Church is a Roman Catholic church, with devotion to Our Lady of Willesden and was the first mission to cater for a growing Irish population in the late 19th century, although the current church was built in 1931.

=== Harlesden House ===
This is a government building, constructed in 1960, that currently contains a Jobcentre Plus office. The site was previously occupied by the Willesden Hippodrome; a Music Hall and Variety Theatre. It was designed by the theatre architect Frank Matcham, opening on 16 September 1907. The Theatre had seating for 3,500 people. The Theatre was destroyed in 1940 during an air raid.

== Demography ==
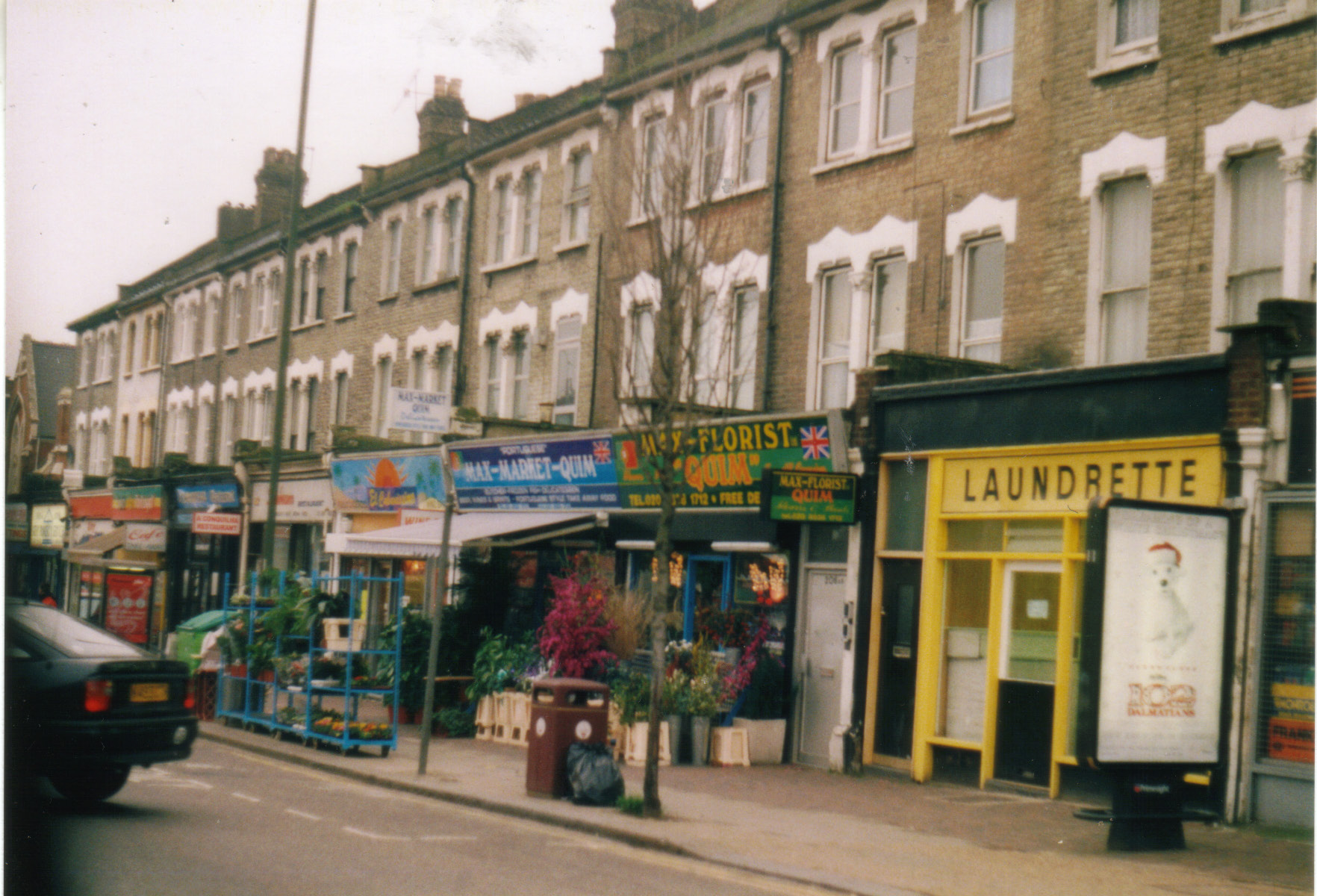
Shops on the High Street, 2001

The 2011 census results for Harlesden ward counted a population of 17,162. In 2011, 71.4% of homes were apartments across the ward, 15.8% of homes were terraced houses, 8.6% semi-detached houses and 4% detached houses; with 0.1% of the homes mobile or temporary structures. Most of the terraces are pre-1920s and the flats converted from them. Many of the flats date to after 2000. Non-mixed use terraces and private sector built apartments are the main housing types that attract high prices from private sector owner-occupiers unable to afford similar properties in nearby Kensal Green and Queen's Park.

Harlesden is ethnically diverse. 67% of the population identified themselves as being BAME (Black, Asian and minority Ethnic) at the 2011 census in the Harlesden ward. Ethnically, 19% of the population was Black Caribbean, followed by 19% Black African (both including those of mixed heritage), 15% Other White, and 14% White British. The main spoken foreign languages were Portuguese and Somali.

=== Crime ===
In the late 1990s to early 2000s, Harlesden and the nearby Stonebridge estate, witnessed a high number of murders and became a crime hotspot, because of several rival yardie gangs. During this time Harlesden turned into one of London's main crack cocaine trading centres, and one of the yardies' strongholds. In 2001 the area reportedly had the highest murder rate in Britain, with 26 shooting incidents that year alone. Through community projects and better policing, crime rates were significantly reduced throughout the 2000s. Crime rates fell at Stonebridge in 2002 and residents reported better living conditions in 2005.

During the nationwide riots of 2011, some shops in Harlesden were attacked by looters.

== Culture and "reggae capital" ==
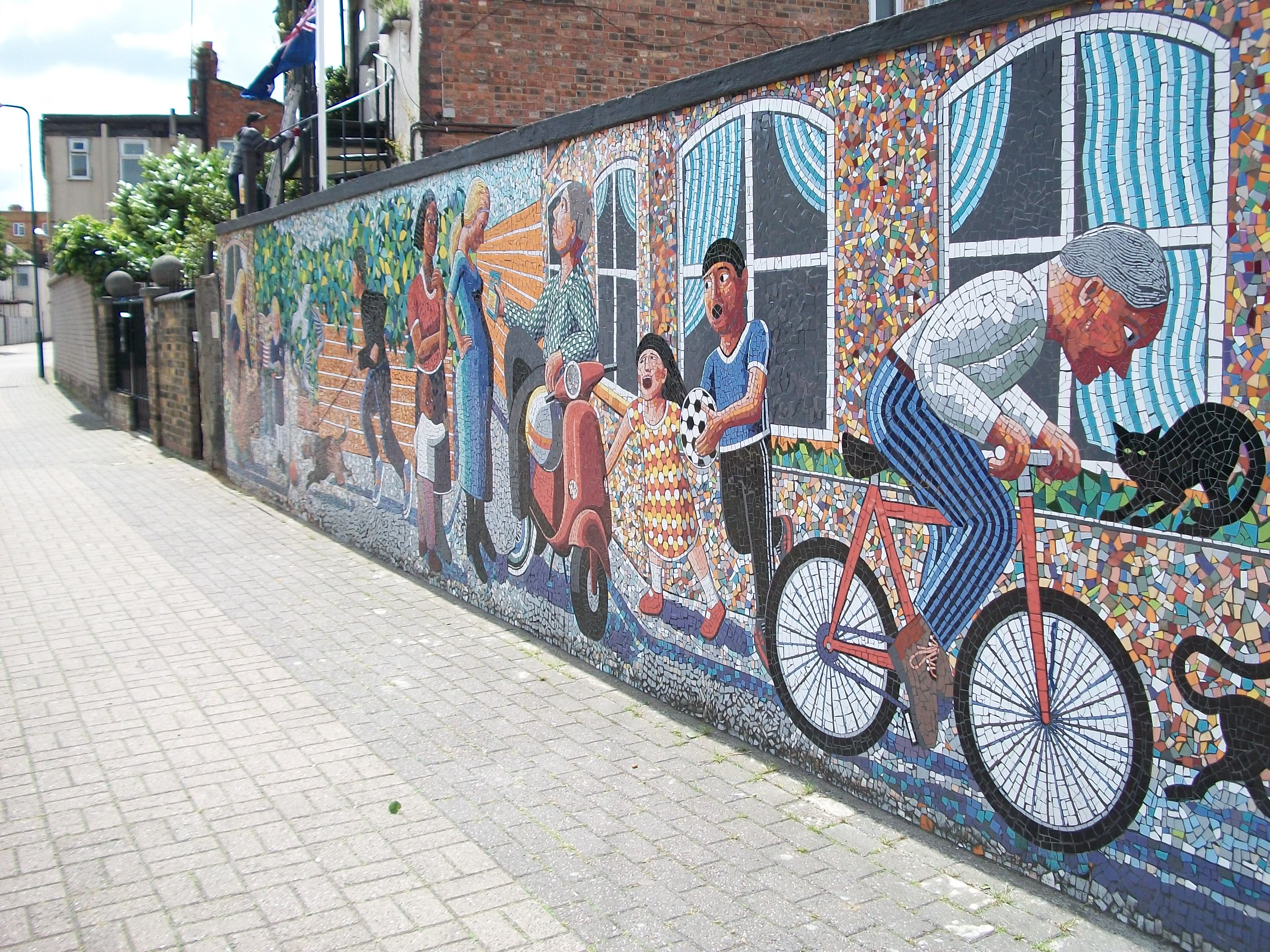
A tile mural on Church Path, Harlesden

Harlesden and some of its surroundings in Brent played a key part in the development of the reggae music business in the UK. In the 1960s Planetone Studios Sonny Roberts the heartbeat of Rhythm & Blues and Ska recordings, releasing and distribution followed by Trojan Records who became a major reggae label, producing successful artists within and in Jamaica, such as Desmond Dekker and Toots and the Maytals, and numerous top 20 UK singles during the 1970s. Another popular label of reggae and other black music was Jet Star, which called itself "the world's largest reggae distributors".

The Brent Black Music Cooperative Rehearsal Studios was set up in Willesden in 1983 by a grant from Brent council. It provided a studio and training for numerous local and international acts such as The Last Poets and Aswad.

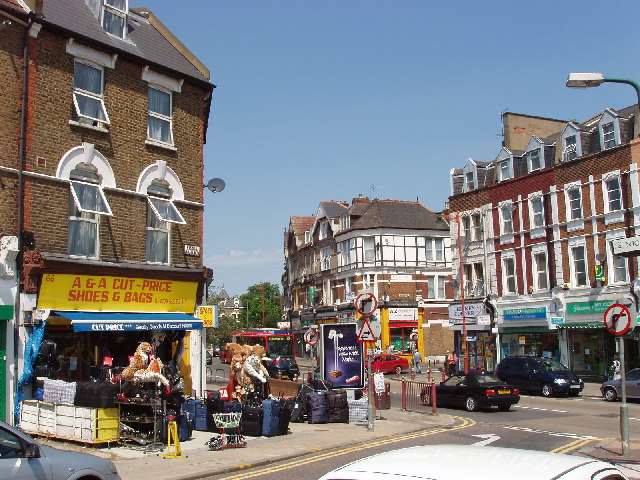
Craven Park Road

In 1970, Sonny Roberts established the first specialist record shop called Orbitone Records, retailing various genres of music but in the mid 1970s became the hub premises for producing, licensing and distributing soca music. During the mid 1970s and 1980s, dozens of record shops filled the Harlesden streets of Church Road, Craven Park Road and the High Street. As of 2020, two still remain in operation on Craven Park Road: Hawkeye and Starlight Records.

The Cimarons, England's first home-grown reggae roots band, was formed in 1969 at Tavistock community centre in Harlesden. Numerous reggae artists lived or live in or around Harlesden, including Dennis Brown (on Hazeldean Road), Janet Kay, General Levy, Jimmy Cliff, Bob Marley (on The Circle, Neasden), Liz Mitchell of Boney M (on Wrottesley Road), and others.

The 1998 musical film Babymother, produced by Channel 4 Films, is set in Harlesden and captures the black dancehall culture in the area. A London Safari: Walking Adventures in NW10 is a 2014 paperback book authored by local Rose Rouse about Harlesden.

Harlesden has produced known hip hop and grime artists such as K Koke, Nines and George the Poet.

== Media ==
The Beat London (formerly known as BANG Radio) is a licensed radio station that broadcasts urban music and cultural programmes from Harlesden High Street. It broadcasts on 103.6 FM throughout north-west London.

Numerous pirate radio stations have always broadcast from the area, being very influential to local black artists, including RJR 98.3, UK Roots 95.4 and Omega Radio 104.1.

Brent's largest newspaper is the Brent & Kilburn Times.

The Queen Victoria Pub in EastEnders on the BBC was inspired by The College Park Hotel in Harlesden.

== Politics and government ==
Harlesden is part of the Queen's Park and Maida Vale constituency for elections to the House of Commons, represented by Georgia Gould from the Labour Party since 2024.

Harlesden is part of the Harlesden and Kensal Green ward for elections to Brent London Borough Council.

== Geography ==
Harlesden is located north of Old Oak Common and the Grand Union Canal. Harrow Road flows through the centre of the area which goes eastwards to Paddington and west towards Wembley.

== Transport ==
Stations in Harlesden are:

- Willesden Junction Station, served by the Bakerloo line, Lioness Line, Mildmay Line and the West London Line, now part of the Mildmay Line.
- Harlesden Station (Bakerloo line and Lioness Line)
- Harlesden is served by the following London buses
  - 226 (Ealing Broadway - Golders Green)
  - 266 (Acton High Street - Brent Cross Shopping Centre)
    - N266 (Hammersmith Bus Station - Brent Cross Shopping Centre)
  - 220 (Wandsworth - Willesden Junction Station)
  - 487 (South Harrow - Willesden Junction Station)
  - 260 (White City - Golders Green)
  - 206 (Wembley Park [The Paddocks] - Kilburn Park Station)
  - 228 (Maida Hill, Chippenham Gardens - Central Middlesex Hospital)
  - 187 (O2 Centre, Finchley Road - Central Middlesex Hospital)
  - 18 (Euston - Sudbury)
    - N18 (Harrow Weald - Trafalgar Square)
  - 224 (Alperton [Sainsbury's] - St Raphael's Estate)

== Notable residents ==
- OG Anunoby
- Ricardo P. Lloyd
- Steve McFadden
- Shane Richie
- Gappy Ranks
- Ronny Jordan
- Sabrina Washington
- James DeGale
- Audley Harrison
- K Koke
- Nines
- George the Poet
- Chizzy Akudolu
- Hastings Banda
- Dennis Brown
- Anthony C. George
- Ian Hancock
- Paul Merson
