= Supreme Records (Pama subsidiary) =

- Parent company: Pama Records
- Genre: Various, with a focus on reggae

Supreme was a subsidiary of the Pama records label. There were a number of reggae releases in the very late-1960s and very early-1970s. The label also released some soul and funk recordings. The label would also release early recordings by John Holt and Bob Marley.

== Selected releases ==
- Mr. Foundation - Time To Pray / Young Budd - SUP 201 - 1969
- King Chubby - What's The World Coming To / Live As One - PS 297 - 1970
- Sound Dimension, Mr. Foundation - More Games / Maga Dog - SUP 202 - 1970
- The Mohawks - Let It Be / Looking Back - SUP 204 - 1970
- The Mohawks - For Our Liberty / Wicked Lady - SUP 205 - 1970
- The Mohawks - Give Me Some / Give Me Some (Instrumental) - SUP 207 - 1970
- The Mohawks - Funky Funky / Funky Funky (Instrumental) - SUP 208 - 1970
- The Emotions/ Matador Allstars - Hallelujah / Boat of Joy - SUP 209 - 1970
- The Mediators, Rupie Edwards All Stars - When You Go to a Party / Stop The Party - SUP 210 - 1970
- Al Brown, John Holt - Always / Share My Rest - SUP 212 - 1970
- Bob Marley, Bunny Gale - I Like It Like This / Am Sorry - SUP 216 - 1971
- Ruddy And Sketto - Every Night / ? - SUP 218 - 1971
- Tony Brevett, Brevett All-Stars - Don't Get Weary / Weary (Version) - SUP 224 - 1971
- Eugene And Burst, Denzil* And Burst - Let It Fall / Can't Change - SUP 225 - 1971
- Dave Barker - Double Heavy / Johnny Dollar - SUP 228 - 1971
