= Bamboo (record label) =

- Founded: 1969
- Founder: Junior Lincoln; Rupert Cunningham
- Genre: Reggae
- Country of origin: Finsbury Park, Haringey, London, England

Bamboo Records was a UK-based reggae label established in 1969 as an outlet for productions by Jamaican producer Clement Dodd, active from the late 1960s into the early 1970s. The label formed part of a broader movement in which Jamaican producers established their own outlets in the United Kingdom to control distribution of their recordings.

== Background ==
=== Bamboo ===
The label was founded by Junior Lincoln in 1969. Rupert Cunningham was also a co-founder. The majority of the label's productions were by Clement Dodd aka Coxsone Dodd. The label was connected with the Ackee, Ashanti and Banana Record labels. They operated out of Junior Lincoln's record store which was said to be a major West Indian music dealership. They were located at 88 Stroud Green Road, Finsbury Park.

Roger St. Pierre was also connected to the label.

In a 2017 interview, Junior Lincoln said that the label had aspects of jazz and African influences. They tried to have the record covers of their releases reflect the music that they were putting out.

=== Ackee ===
The Ackee catalogue numbering started with the ACK-100 series. Later in 1973, it was changed to the ACK-500 series.

== History ==
In 1969, the label released the compilation, A Scorcha from Bamboo (Bamboo BLP 202). It featured "I Shall Be Released" by the Heptones, "Moving Away" by Ken Boothe, "Girl I'm Sorry" by Owen Grey, "More Love" by Jackie Mittoo, and "Walking in the Footsteps" by Dobby Dobson.

In January 1970, Ackee artists, Boston & the Soulites had a record out, "Starvation", released on Ackee ACK 103. It received a positive review by Record Mirror in the January 10 issue. Also Jackie Mittoo's "Clean Up" which was released on Bamboo BAM 15 had a positive review.

Jackie Mittoo had a single out in 1970 on Bamboo BA51. "Dancing Groove" was backed by "Peanut Butter" by Black & George.

It was noted by Cash Box in the September 25, 1971 issue that there was a possibility of a film with the artists on the label. They were also set to issue six albums plus six singles by Christmas. Junior Lincoln was also in the United States at the time signing new artists to the label.
