= Dandy Livingstone =

Jamiacan-British musician (born 1943)

- Born: Robert Livingstone Thompson; 14 December 1943 (age 82); Kingston, Jamaica
- Origin: Kingston, Jamaica
- Genres: Ska, rocksteady, reggae
- Labels: Trojan, Carnival

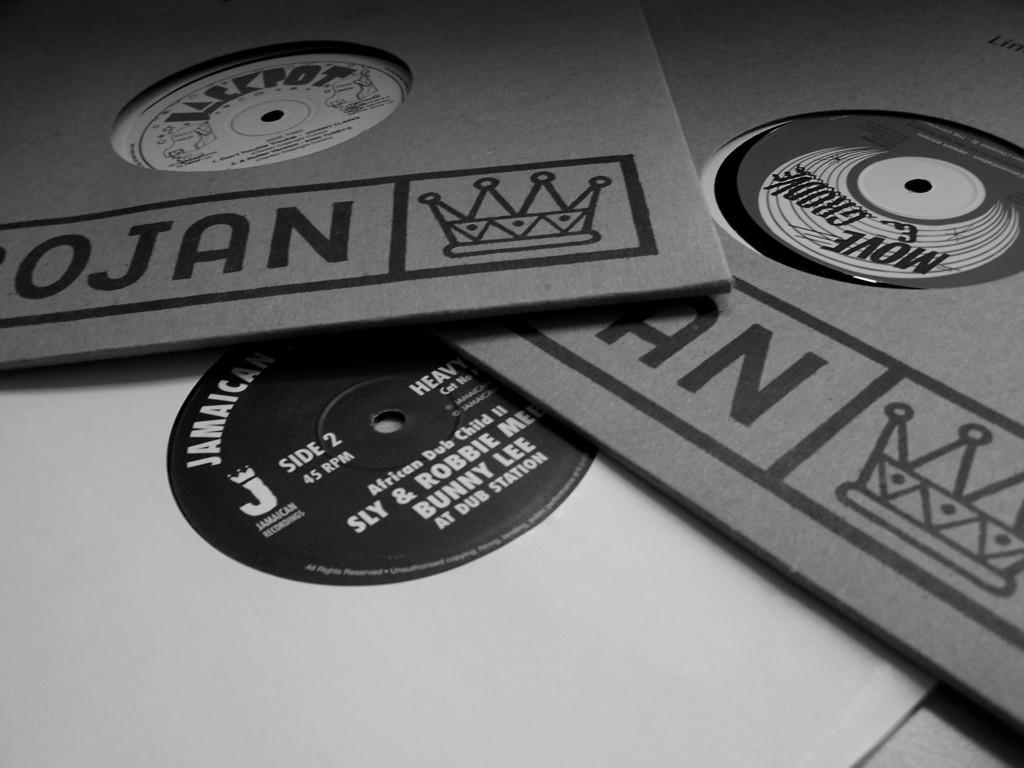
Trojan LPs.jpg

Dandy Livingstone (born Robert Livingstone Thompson, 14 December 1943) is a British-Jamaican ska, rocksteady and reggae musician and record producer, best known for his 1972 hit "Suzanne Beware of the Devil", and for his song "Rudy, a Message to You", which was later a hit for the Specials. "Suzanne Beware of the Devil" reached number 14 on the UK Singles Chart and number 78 in Australia. In the early 1960s, Livingstone recorded some of the bestselling UK-produced ska singles of the era.

== Biography ==
At the age of 15, Livingstone moved to the United Kingdom to live with his estranged mother in London. Livingstone's first record was released without his knowledge – a tenant in the building where he and a friend jammed recorded some of these sessions and released some tracks on the Planetone label. When London-based Carnival Records was seeking a Jamaican vocal duo, Livingstone filled the requirement by double-tracking his own voice, releasing records in this fashion under the name Sugar & Dandy. One of these singles, "What a Life", sold 25,000 copies, providing Livingstone with his first hit. When called on to perform live, Roy Smith was recruited to make up the duo, although he would be replaced by Tito "Sugar" Simon.

Prior to becoming a musician, Livingstone first worked as a record salesman – an episode that was his door into the music industry. In 1967, Livingstone signed with Ska Beat Records, for whom he recorded his debut album, 1967's Rocksteady with Dandy.

In 1968, Livingstone moved into production, and formed a duo with Audrey Hall (as Dandy & Audrey). His production of other artists included the Marvels' debut album and singles by Nicky Thomas ("Suzanne Beware of the Devil") and Tony Tribe ("Red Red Wine"), the latter a minor hit in the UK.

In the late 1960s, Livingstone worked with the trombonist Rico Rodriguez, who was featured on "Rudy, a Message to You". Rodriguez later played with the Specials, whose 1979 cover version made the song famous. Livingstone produced several singles for Rodriguez under the name Rico & the Rudies.

Livingstone signed to Trojan Records in 1968, releasing two albums, Follow That Donkey and Dandy Returns and having hits in 1972–73 with his own version of Suzanne, Beware Of The Devil (#14 UK) and Big City (#26 UK). A Trojan subsidiary, Down Town Records, was set up to release Livingstone's output, both as a singer and producer, and the J-Dan subsidiary served the same purpose in the early 1970s. Livingstone returned to Jamaica, living there until 1973.

Livingstone resurfaced in 1973 with the single "Black Star" on Mooncrest Records and the album Conscious. On his return to the UK, he recorded a self-titled album at Byron Lee's studio.

It was announced on 11 September 2011 that Livingstone would be performing for the first time in over 40 years at the 2012 London International Ska Festival on 3–6 May. Though it was announced on stage that he had been present at the sound check, he did not perform.

== Discography ==
=== Albums ===
- Rocksteady with Dandy (1967), Giant
- Follow That Donkey (1968), Trojan – Brother Dan All Stars
- Dandy Returns (1968), Trojan
- Let's Catch the Beat (1969), Trojan – Brother Dan All Stars
- Your Musical Doctor (1969), Downtown/Trojan
- I Need You (1969), Ska Beat – Dandy & Audrey
- Morning Side of the Mountain (1970) – Dandy & Audrey
- Dandy Livingstone (1972), Trojan
- Conscious (1973), Mooncrest
- Home from Home (1976), Charisma
- The South African Experience (1978), Night Owl
- Doo Wop Style (1980), Mint Music
- They Call Us Legends (2020), Par 3 Music

=== Compilations ===
- Suzanne Beware of the Devil (The Best of Dandy Livingstone) (2002), Trojan Records
- Let's Catch the Beat: The Music That Launched the Legend (2003), Trojan – Dandy and the Brother Dan All Stars
- The Best of Dandy Livingstone (2xCD) (2017), Trojan

=== Singles ===
Credited to 'Dandy' except where stated.

- "One Man Went to Mow" (1964), Carnival (as Sugar and Dandy)
- "What a Life" (1964), Carnival (as Sugar and Dandy)
- "Oh Dear" (1964), Carnival (as Sugar and Dandy)
- "I'm Not Crying Now" (1964), Carnival (as Sugar and Dandy)
- "Rudie Don't Go" (1964), Dice
- "You Got to Pray" (1964), Dice (as Dandy & Barbara)
- "The Operation" (1964), Dice
- "Let's Ska" (1965), Carnival (as Sugar and Dandy)
- "I'm into Something Good" / "Crazy for You" (1965), Carnival (as Sugar and Dandy)
- "Think of the Good Times" / "Girl Come See" (1965), Carnival (as Sugar and Dandy)
- "I Want to Be Your Lover" / "I Don't Know What" (1965), Carnival (as Sugar and Dandy)
- "Without Love" (1965), Blue Beat (as the Rub a Dubs)
- "To Love You" (1965), Blue Beat
- "Hey Boy, Hey Girl" (1965), Blue Beat (as Dandy & Del)
- "My Baby" (1965), Blue Beat
- "I Found Love" (1966), Blue Beat
- "My Time Now" / "East of Suez" (1967), Giant (as Dandy & His Group)
- "You're No Hustler" (1967), Ska Beat
- "Rudy a Message to You" / "Till Death Do Us Part" (1967), Ska Beat (B-side as Dandy & His Group)
- "The Fight" (1967), Ska Beat (as Dandy & His Group)
- "One Scotch, One Bourbon, One Beer" (1967), Ska Beat (as Dandy & His Group)
- "Puppet on a String" (1967), Giant (as Dandy & His Group)
- "We Are Still Rude" / "Let's Do Rock Steady" (1967), Giant
- "Somewhere My Love" (1967), Giant (as Dandy & His Group)
- "There Is a Mountain" (1967), Giant
- "Charlie Brown" (1968), Giant (as Dandy & His Group)
- "Ain't That a Shame" (1968), Giant (as Dandy & the Superboys)
- "Propagandist" (1968), Giant
- "Sweet Ride" (1968), Giant
- "Tears on My Pillow" (1968), Giant
- "You're Hurtin' Me" (1968), Giant (as Dandy & the Superboys)
- "I'm Back with a Bang Bang" (1968), Giant (as Dandy & the Superboys)
- "Message to You Girl" (1968), Giant (as Dandy & the Superboys)
- "That's How Strong My Love Is" (1968), Jolly (as Bobby Thompson)
- "Donkey Returns" (1968), Trojan (as Dandy & Brother Dan All Stars)
- "Read Up" (1968), Trojan (as Dandy & Brother Dan All Stars)
- "Another Saturday Night" (1968), Trojan (as Dandy & Brother Dan All Stars)
- "The Toast" (1968), Trojan
- "Move Your Mule" (1968), Down Town
- "Come Back Girl" (1968), Down Town
- "Tell Me Darling" (1968), Down Town (as Brother Dan)
- "Copy Your Rhythm" (1968), Down Town (as Dandy & Brother Dan All Stars)
- "Doctor Sure Shot" (1969), Down Town
- "Reggae in Your Jeggae" (1969), Down Town
- "Moma Moma" (1969), Down Town (as Dandy & the Israelites)
- "Rock Steady Gone" (1969), Down Town
- "I'm Your Puppet" (1969), Down Town
- "Everybody Feel Good" (1969), Down Town (as Dandy & the Downtown All Stars)
- "People Get Ready (Do Rocksteady)" (1969), Down Town (as the Rudies)
- "Seven Books" (1969), Down Town (as Dandy & the Israelites)
- "Be Natural Be Proud" (1969), Down Town
- "Come on Home" (1969), Down Town
- "Everybody Loves a Winner" (1969), Down Town
- "Music Doctor Chapter I/II" (1969), Down Town (as Dandy & the Musical Doctors)
- "Raining in My Heart" (1970), Down Town
- "Build Your Love on a Solid Foundation" (1970), Down Town
- "Version Girl" (1970), Down Town (as Boy Friday)
- "Music So Good" (1970), Down Town (as Boy Friday & the Groovers)
- "Rudy, a Message to You" (1970), Down Town (as Boy Friday)
- "Bush Doctor" (1970), J-Dan (as Dandy & the Music Doctors)
- "Can't Help from Crying" (1970), J-Dan (as Dandy & the Israelites)
- "The Wild Bunch" (1970), J-Dan (as Dandy & the Music Doctors)
- "In the Summertime" (1970), J-Dan (as Dandy & the Music Doctors)
- "Take a Letter, Maria" (1970), Trojan
- "Same Old Fashioned Way" (1971), Trojan
- "I Don't Want No War" (1971), J-Dan (as Boy Friday)
- "Situation Version" (1971), J-Dan (as Our Band)
- "There'll Always Be Sunshine" (1971), Down Town (as Boy Friday)
- "Hot Pant Girl" (1971), Down Town (as Boy Friday)
- "Salt of the Earth" (1971), Trojan
- "The Pliers" (1971), Down Town (as Dandy & the Musical Doctors)
- "El Raunchy" (1971), Down Town (as Boy Friday)
- "Daddy's Home" (1971), Down Town (as Boy Friday)
- "Give Me Some More" (1972), Down Town (as Dandy & the Studio Sound)
- "Suzanne Beware of the Devil" (1972), Horse (as Dandy Livingstone)
- "What Do You Want to Make Those Eyes at Me For" (1972), Trojan
- "Big City" (1973), Horse (as Dandy Livingstone)
- "Come Back Liza" (1973), Horse (as Dandy Livingstone)
- "Black Star" (1973), Mooncrest (as Dandy Livingstone)
- "Caribbean Rock" (1974), Horse (as Dandy Livingstone)
- "Let's Tango" (1976), Charisma (as R.D. Livingstone)
- "The South African Experience" (1978), Night Owl (as R.D. Livingstone)
- "Righteous Man" (1980), Minit Music (as R.D. Livingstone)
- "Living in S.U.S." (1980), Ric (as R.D. Livingstone)
