= The Easybeats discography =

- Studio albums: 6
- EPs: 11
- Live albums: 1
- Compilation albums: 17
- Singles: 24

The discography of Australian rock band the Easybeats.

== Albums ==
=== Studio albums ===
List of studio albums, with selected chart positions
Title	Album details	Peak chart positions	
Title	Album details	AUS	US
Easy	Released: 23 September 1965; Label: Albert Productions / Parlophone (Parlophone PMCO-7527); Format: Vinyl	4	—
It's 2 Easy	Released: 24 March 1966; Label: Albert Productions / Parlophone (Parlophone PMCO-7530); Format: Vinyl	3	—
Volume 3	Released: 3 November 1966; Label: Albert Productions / Parlophone (Parlophone PMCO-7537); Format: Vinyl	17	—
Good Friday (not released in Australia)	Released: May 1967; Label: United Artists (SULP 1167 (UK)); Format: Vinyl	—	—
Friday On My Mind	Released: May 1967 (US) / October 1970 (AUS); Label: United Artists (6588 (US); Format: Vinyl	—	180
Vigil	Released: 18 June 1968 (UK), October 1968 (AUS); Label: Parlophone (PMCO-7551) / United Artists (SULP 11936 (UK), 69170 (GER)); Format: Vinyl	—	—
Falling Off the Edge of the World	Released: October 1968; Label: United Artists (UAS-6667 (USA)); Format: Vinyl	—	—
Friends	Released: February 1970; Label: Polydor (184246 / 2482010); Format: Vinyl	—	—

=== Live albums ===
List of live albums, with selected details
Title	Album details
Live – Studio & Stage	Released: October 1995; Label: Raven (Raven RVCD-40); Format: Compact Disc

=== Compilation albums ===
List of compilation albums, with selected chart positions
Title	Album details	Peak chart positions
Title	Album details	AUS
The Best of The Easybeats + Pretty Girl	Released: June 1967; Label: Albert Productions / Parlophone (Parlophone PMCO-7541); Format: Vinyl	3
The Best of The Easybeats Volume 2	Released: 9 October 1969; Label: Albert Productions / Parlophone (Parlophone PMCO-7555); Format: Vinyl	—
Nostalgia Volume 1 (France only)	Released: 1972; Label: United Artists (UAS 29627); Format: Vinyl	—
Let's Dance with the Easybeats (Germany only)	Released: 1972; Label: Sunset (SLS 50 162 Z); Format: Vinyl	—
The Shame Just Drained	Released: 10 October 1977; Label: Albert Productions / Parlophone (APLP-026); Format: Vinyl	—
Absolute Anthology 1965 to 1969	Released: 17 November 1980; Label: Albert Productions / EMI Music (APLP-026); Format: Vinyl, CD	35
The Easybeats	Released: September 1981; Label: Hammard (HAM 062); Format: Vinyl, CD	76
The Raven EP LP	Released: 1982; Compilation of the three Raven EPs from 1979, 1980 and 1982.; Label: Raven (RVLP-06); Format: Vinyl	—
Friday on My Mind	Released: 1985; Label: Fan Club (FC 014); Format: Vinyl, CD	—
The Best of the Easybeats (US only)	Released: 1985; Label: Rhino (RNLP 124); Format: Vinyl, CD	—
The Easybeats Collection (Germany only)	Released: 1989; Label: Line Music / Impact (IMCD 9.00823 O); Format: CD, cassette	—
The Definitive Series	Released: September 1992; Label: Albert Productions (472297); Format: CD, cassette	—
The Best of the Easybeats	Released: 1995; Label: Repertoire (REP 4542); Format: CD	—
Gonna Have a Good Time (US only)	Released: 1999; Label: Sin-Drome/Retroactive (SD 8936); Format: CD	—
The Singles As & Bs	Released: 2003; Label: Repertoire (REP 5039); Format: CD	—
The Complete Easybeats	Released: 2004; 6-CD set; Label: Albert Productions / Sony BMG (82876866332); Format: CD	—
The Very Best of the Easybeats	Released: 2005; Label: Repertoire (REP 5040); Format: CD	—

== Extended plays ==
List of EP, with selected chart positions and certifications
Title	EP details	Peak chart positions
Title	EP details	AUS
She's So Fine	Released: October 1965; Label: Parlophone (GEPO 70024); Format: Vinyl	—
Easy As Can Be	Released: February 1966; Label: Parlophone (GEPO 70028); Format: Vinyl	—
Easyfever	Released: August 1966; Label: Parlophone (GEPO 70032); Format: Vinyl	1
Friday on My Mind	Released: August 1967; Label: Parlophone (GEPO 70041); Format: Vinyl	—
Pretty Girl	Released: November 1967; Label: Parlophone (GEPO 70046); Format: Vinyl	—
Easyfever Volume 2	Released: January 1968; Label: Parlophone (GEPO 70048); Format: Vinyl	—
Mean Old Lovin'	Released: November 1979; Label: Raven (RV-01); Format: Vinyl, cassette	—
Son of Easyfever	Released: 1980; Label: Raven (RV-07); Format: Vinyl, cassette	—
Son of Son of Easyfever	Released: 1982; Label: Raven (RV-11); Format: Vinyl, cassette	—
HistorEasy (Tour '86)	Released: October 1986; Label: Albert Productions (AP 1871); Format: Vinyl, cassette	—
Little Bit of Gold	Released: 1989; Label: Rhino (R3 73053); Format: Vinyl, cassette	—

== Singles ==
List of singles, with selected peak chart positions
Title	Year	Chart positions					Album
Title	Year	AUS	CAN	NZ	UK	US	Album
"For My Woman" / "Say That You're Mine"	1965	33	—	—	—	—	She's So Fine (EP)
"She's So Fine" / "The Old Oak Tree"	1965	3	—	—	—	—	Easy
"Wedding Ring" / "Me or You"	1965	7	—	—	—	—	It's 2 Easy
"Sad and Lonely and Blue" / "Easy as Can Be"	1965	21	—	—	—	—	It's 2 Easy
"Women (Make You Feel Alright)" / "In My Book"	1966	4	—	—	—	—	It's 2 Easy
"Come and See Her" / "I Can See"	1966	3	—	—	—	—	It's 2 Easy
"Sorry" / "Funny Feelin'"	1966	1	—	4	—	—	Volume 3
"Friday on My Mind" / "Made My Bed: Gonna Lie in It"	1966	1	13	2	6	16	Good Friday
"Who'll Be the One" / "Do You Have a Soul" / "Saturday Night"	1967	14	—	—	—	—	Good Friday
"Heaven and Hell" / "Pretty Girl"	1967	8	—	—	55 (Note: Chart position is from the official UK "Breakers List".)	—	Pretty Girl (EP)
"Falling Off the Edge of the World" / "Remember Sam"	1967	—	—	—	—	—	Falling Off the Edge of the World
"The Music Goes 'Round My Head" / "Come in You'll Get Pneumonia"	1967	33	—	—	53	—	Vigil
"Hello, How Are You" / "Falling Off the Edge of the World"	1968	34	—	—	20	—	Vigil
"Land of Make Believe" / "We All Live Happily"	1968	18	—	—	—	—	Vigil
"Good Times" / "Lay Me Down and Die"	1968	22	—	—	—	—	Vigil
"Lay Me Down and Die" / "See Line Woman"	1968	59	—	—	—	—	Vigil
"St. Louis" / "Can't Find Love"	1969	21	57	—	—	100	Friends
"I Can't Stand It" / "Come in You'll Get Pneumonia" (EU only)	1969	—	—	—	—	—	Vigil
"Peculiar Hole in the Sky"/ "H.P. Man"	1969	53	—	—	—	—	The Best of the Easybeats Volume 2
"I Love Marie" / "Gonna Make It"	1969	93	—	—	—	—	Friends
"Friends" / "Rock and Roll Boogie"	1970	—	—	—	—	—	Friends
"Rock and Roll Boogie" / "Woman You're on My Mind" (EU only)	1970	—	—	—	—	—	Friends
"Good Times" / "Land of Make Believe" (re-release)	1976	—	—	—	—	—	Non-album singles
"Friday on My Mind" / "She's So Fine" / "Wedding Ring" (re-release)	1980	92	—	—	—	—	Non-album singles

=== In Spanish ===
List of Spanish-language singles
Title	Year
"El Viernes de Mi Recuerdos" (Friday on My Mind)	1966
"Cielo e Infierno" (Heaven and Hell)	1967
"Quién Será" (Who'll Be the One) / "Acerbate de Sam" (Remembering Sam)	1967
"La Musical Gira Alrededor de Mi Cabeza" (The Music Goes Round My Head) / "Buenos Tiempos" (Good Times)	1968
"¿Hola, Cómo Estás?" (Hello, How Are You?) / "País de Fantasia" (Land of Make Believe)	1968
"No Se Puedo Encontrar Amor" (Can't Find Love)	1969
