= Absolute Anthology 1965 to 1969 =

Compilation album by The Easybeats
- Released: 17 November 1980
- Recorded: 1965–1969
- Studio: 2UW Theatre, 2UW Studios, EMI Studios (Sydney), Armstrong Studios (Melbourne), IBC Studios, Olympic Studios and Central Sound Studios (London).
- Genre: Rock; pop; psychedelic pop
- Length: 116:31
- Label: Albert
- Producer: Ted Albert; Shel Talmy; Glyn Johns; Vanda & Young
- Compiler: Glenn A. Baker

The Easybeats chronology
| The Shame Just Drained (1977) | Absolute Anthology 1965 to 1969 (1980) | The Definitive Series (1992) |

Professional ratings
Review scores
| Source | Rating |
|---|---|
| AllMusic | 4.5/5 stars |
| Rolling Stone Album Guide | 5/5 stars |

Absolute Anthology 1965 to 1969 is a compilation album by Australian rock band The Easybeats, released on November 17, 1980. The album was compiled by Australian rock journalist Glenn A. Baker. It features singles, EP, album tracks, unreleased studio & demo recordings and other rarities spanning the group's recording career. It reached #37 on the Australian albums charts. This album was re-released in 1986 on compact disc.

The album was remastered by Don Bartley and reissued on compact disc in Australia on 29 September 2017 This was a 4 CD disc release with no additional content and each disc containing the tracklisting of each side of the original vinyl LP.

== Track listing ==
Disc 1

Tracks written by Stevie Wright & George Young except where listed.

Side A
| No. | Title | Writer(s) | Length |
|---|---|---|---|
| 1. | "For My Woman" (non-album single, 1965) | | 3:02 |
| 2. | "Say That You're Mine" (non-album B-side, 1965) | Harry Vanda, George Young | 2:40 |
| 3. | "She's So Fine" (from Easy, 1965) | | 2:02 |
| 4. | "Wedding Ring" (from It's 2 Easy, 1966) | | 1:58 |
| 5. | "Sad And Lonely And Blue" (from It's 2 Easy, 1966) | | 2:28 |
| 6. | "You Said That" (from Volume 3, 1966) | | 2:10 |
| 7. | "You Got It Off Me" (from Easy, 1965) | | 2:32 |
| 8. | "You Can't Do That" (from Easy, 1965) | | 2:22 |
| 9. | "Funny Feelin'" (from Volume 3, 1966) | | 2:22 |
| 10. | "In My Book" (from It's 2 Easy, 1966) | | 2:25 |
| 11. | "Women" (from It's 2 Easy, 1966) | | 3:05 |

Side B
| No. | Title | Writer(s) | Length |
|---|---|---|---|
| 1. | "Come and See Her" (from It's 2 Easy) | | 3:02 |
| 2. | "I'll Make You Happy" (from the Easyfever EP, 1966) | | 2:40 |
| 3. | "Too Much" (from the Easyfever EP, 1966) | | 2:02 |
| 4. | "Sorry" (from Volume 3, 1966) | | 1:58 |
| 5. | "Made My Bed : Gonna Lie In It" (from Good Friday (UK) & Friday On My Mind (US), 1967) | Young | 2:28 |
| 6. | "Friday On My Mind" (from Good Friday (UK) & Friday On My Mind (US), 1967) | Vanda, Young | 2:10 |
| 7. | "Pretty Girl" (from Good Friday (UK) & Friday On My Mind (US), 1967) | Vanda, Young | 2:32 |
| 8. | "Remember Sam" (from Good Friday (UK) & Friday On My Mind (US), 1967) | Vanda, Young | 2:22 |
| 9. | "Who'll Be the One" (from Good Friday (UK) & Friday On My Mind (US), 1967) | Vanda, Young | 2:22 |
| 10. | "Do You Have A Soul" (from Good Friday (UK) & Friday On My Mind (US), 1967) | Vanda, Young | 2:25 |
| 11. | "Heaven and Hell" (non-album single, 1967) | Vanda, Young | 3:05 |

Disc 2

Tracks written by Harry Vanda & George Young except where listed.

Side A
| No. | Title | Writer(s) | Length |
|---|---|---|---|
| 1. | "Hello, How Are You?" (from Vigil, 1968) | | 3:56 |
| 2. | "Come In You'll Get Pneumonia" (single version, 1967) | Vanda, Young, Tony Cahill | 3:23 |
| 3. | "Good Times" (from Vigil, 1968) | | 3:23 |
| 4. | "Bring A Little Lovin'" (Central Sounds Demo released on Australian Vigil, 1968) | | 2:20 |
| 5. | "The Music Goes 'Round My Head" ("fast" Italian & Spanish single version, 1968) | | 2:16 |
| 6. | "Falling Off the Edge of the World" (UK non-album B-side version, 1968) | | 2:33 |
| 7. | "The Shame Just Drained" (Central Sound Studio demo (1968), first released on The Shame Just Drained, 1977) | | 2:40 |
| 8. | "What In the World" (from Vigil, 1968) | | 2:15 |
| 9. | "Land of Make Believe" (from Vigil, 1968) | | 3:10 |
| 10. | "Peculiar Hole in the Sky" (non-album single (Australia), 1969) | | 2:48 |

Side B
| No. | Title | Length |
|---|---|---|
| 1. | "Lisa" (non-album EP track, 1967) | 3:10 |
| 2. | "Saturday Night" (from Good Friday (UK) & Friday On My Mind (US), 1967) | 3:24 |
| 3. | "Amanda Storey" (unreleased studio track (1967), first released on The Shame Just Drained, 1977) | 2:43 |
| 4. | "Down To The Last 500" (Central Sound demo (1968), first released on The Best of The Easybeats Volume 2, 1969) | 2:38 |
| 5. | "Lay Me Down and Die" (unreleased vocal version (1968), first released on The Best of The Easybeats Volume 2 reissue, 1975) | 2:48 |
| 6. | "Wait A Minute" (Central Sound demo (1968), first released on The Shame Just Drained, 1977) | 2:37 |
| 7. | "I Love Marie" (from Friends) | 2:35 |
| 8. | "Rock And Roll Boogie" (from Friends) | 2:27 |
| 9. | "Can't Find Love" (from Friends) | 3:25 |
| 10. | "St. Louis" (from Friends) | 3:08 |

== Charts ==
| Chart | Peak position |
|---|---|
| Australian Kent Music Report | 37 |
