= The Best of The Easybeats + Pretty Girl =

Greatest hits album by the Easybeats
- Released: 1 June 1967
- Recorded: 1965–1966
- Studio: Armstrong, Melbourne; EMI, Sydney; IBC, London
- Genre: Beat, garage rock
- Length: 34:41
- Label: Parlophone/Albert
- Producer: Ted Albert; Shel Talmy

The Easybeats Australian chronology
Good Friday (1967)	The Best of The Easybeats + Pretty Girl (1967)	Vigil (1968)

1975 Drum Records reissue
- The Best of The Easybeats Featuring Stevie Wright

1997 reissue
- The Best of The Easybeats

The Best of The Easybeats + Pretty Girl is the first compilation album by the Australian rock band the Easybeats featuring a selection of songs recorded by the group between 1965 and 1966. The album was originally released in Australia and New Zealand under the Parlophone label under the then current licensing arrangement by the band's production company Albert Productions.

== Background ==
After the success of the band's single "Friday On My Mind" in the U.K., The Easybeats continued work with the single's producer Shel Talmy on a debut album for their international label United Artists Records. The finished album, titled Good Friday, was released in Europe in May 1967. However, due to contract issues, no album of the new material was released in their home country of Australia.

Instead Albert Productions compiled "greatest hits" package of the band's most popular Australian singles and EP tracks. Three songs from the Good Friday album were included on the album, with "Pretty Girl" (which hadn't yet seen a release in Australia) promoted as a "new" song. The album was released in May 1967 during the group's homecoming tour of Australia.

== Releases ==
The album was first released in May 1967 during the band's homecoming tour of Australia. It was reissued on the budget Drum Records label in June 1975, along with The Best of The Easybeats Volume 2. The album's cover art title was changed to The Best of The Easybeats Featuring Stevie Wright.

The first release on CD was in 1986 on the Albert Productions label and again in the 1997 through EMI. The 1997 released would again change the cover art and title to simply The Best of The Easybeats.

On 6 August 2013, the album was remastered and made available through the iTunes Store. For the 2014 Australian Record Store Day, a limited edition 180-gram vinyl LP was released. This vinyl release was released by Albert Productions and remastered by renowned mastering engineer Don Bartley.

== Reception ==
Released May 1967 just before the band's homecoming tour, it reached #3 on the Kent Music Report. It was the 20th highest selling album in Australia of 1967. In October 2010, it was listed at No. 6 in the book, 100 Best Australian Albums.

== Track listing ==
=== Side A ===
All tracks are written by Stevie Wright & George Young except as noted.

No.	Title	Originally Released on	Length
1.	"For My Woman"	"For My Woman" single	3:08
2.	"She's So Fine"	"She's So Fine" single and Easy album	2:06
3.	"Wedding Ring"	"Wedding Ring" single and It's 2 Easy album	2:04
4.	"Sad Lonely And Blue"	"Sad Lonely And Blue" single and It's 2 Easy album	2:81
5.	"Easy As Can Be"	"Sad Lonely And Blue" single and It's 2 Easy album	2:35
6.	"In My Book"	"Women (Make You Feel Alright)" single and It's 2 Easy album	3:10
7.	"Women (Make You Feel Alright)"	"Women (Make You Feel Alright)" single and It's 2 Easy album	2:37

=== Side B ===
No.	Title	Originally Released on	Length
1.	"Pretty Girl" (Harry Vanda, Young)	The Best of The Easybeats + Pretty Girl later as the B-side to "Heaven and Hell"	3:08
2.	"Come And See Her"	"Come And See Her" single and It's 2 Easy album	2:43
3.	"I'll Make You Happy"	Easyfever EP	3:12
4.	"Too Much"	Easyfever EP	1:48
5.	"Sorry"	"Sorry" single and Volume 3 album	2:35
6.	"Made My Bed; Gonna Lie in It" (Vanda, Young)	"Friday on My Mind" single	2:10
7.	"Friday on My Mind" (Vanda, Young)	"Friday on My Mind" single	2:43

== Personnel ==
The Easybeats

- Stevie Wright - vocals, percussion
- Harry Vanda - vocals, harmonies, guitars
- George Young - vocals, harmonies, guitars
- Dick Diamonde - vocals, bass
- Snowy Fleet - drums

== Producers ==
- Ted Albert - producer
- Shel Talmy - producer for "Friday on My Mind", "Made My Bed; Gonna Lie in It" and "Pretty Girl"

== Charts ==
Chart	Peak position
Australian Albums	3
