= Falling Off the Edge of the World (album) =

Studio album by The Easybeats
- Released: October 1968
- Genre: Rock
- Length: 35:13
- Label: United Artists Records

The Easybeats North American chronology
Friday On My Mind (1967)	Falling Off the Edge of the World (1968)

Singles from Falling Off the Edge of the World
- 1. "Falling Off the Edge of the World"/"Remember Sam" Released: September 1967; 2. "Hello, How Are You"/"Falling Off the Edge of the World" Released: July 1968; 3. "Gonna Have A Good Time (Good Times)"/"Lay Me Down And Die" Released: January 1969

Professional ratings
Review scores
Source	Rating
Allmusic	link

Falling Off the Edge of the World was the North American version of The Easybeats album Vigil. It was issued in October 1968 with a different album cover and running order from the UK release. This version was pared down to 12 songs from 14, omitting "Sha La La" and "We All Live Happily Together". A different recording of the title track (known as the "second version") replaced the more common version from the Australian and UK/European releases. This version of the album has also been released on CD, paired with Friday On My Mind on the Collectables label.

== Track listing ==
All songs written by Harry Vanda & George Young except as noted.

Side A
No.	Title	Writer(s)	Length
1.	"Good Times"		3:23
2.	"What in the World"		2:18
3.	"Falling Off the Edge of the World" (second version)		3:00
4.	"The Music Goes Round My Head"		2:51
5.	"Can't Take My Eyes Off You"	Bob Crewe, Bob Gaudio	3:35
6.	"Come In You'll Get Pneumonia"	Tony Cahill, Vanda, Young	3:46

Side B
No.	Title	Writer(s)	Length
1.	"See Saw"		2:39
2.	"Land of Make Believe"		3:13
3.	"Fancy Seeing You Here"		2:36
4.	"Hello How Are You"		3:20
5.	"Hit the Road Jack"	Percy Mayfield	2:57
6.	"I Can't Stand It"	Wyatt McPherson, Paul Williams	2:57

== Personnel ==
=== The Easybeats ===
- Stevie Wright – vocals
- Harry Vanda – vocals, lead guitar
- George Young – vocals, rhythm guitar
- Dick Diamonde – bass guitar
- Tony Cahill – drums

=== Additional musicians ===
- Steve Marriott – vocals on "Good Times"
- George Alexander – vocals on "Come In You'll Get Pneumonia"

=== Production ===
- The Easybeats – producer
- Mike Vaughan – producer
- Glyn Johns – producer
