= Friday on My Mind (album) =

Friday On My Mind

Studio album by the Easybeats
- Released: May 1967
- Recorded: September 1966 – March 1967; (except mid-1965 for "Make You Feel Alright (Women)")
- Studio: IBC and Olympic, London; EMI, Sydney
- Genre: Beat, garage rock, psychedelic pop
- Label: United Artists
- Producer: Shel Talmy

The Easybeats US chronology
Friday On My Mind (1967)	Falling off The Edge of The World (1968)

The Easybeats Australian chronology
Friends (1970)	Friday On My Mind (1970)	The Shame Just Drained (1977)

Singles from Friday On My Mind
- 1. "Friday On My Mind" / "Made My Bed: Gonna Lie In It" Released: December 1966

Professional ratings
Review scores
Source	Rating
Allmusic	link

Friday On My Mind is the first North American album by the Australian rock band the Easybeats. The album was released as Good Friday in Europe, in the same month. This version omitted "Hound Dog" and replaced it with "Women" (re-titled "Make You Feel Alright (Women)") from the Australian It's 2 Easy album.

Like Good Friday, due to contract issues between United Artists Records and Albert Productions, the album was not released in the band's native Australia at the time. Friday On My Mind was later released in Australia in 1970 on the budget World Record Club label. The Australian release featured new artwork, which was a drawing of the group as they appeared during the 1969 Australian tour (including drummer Tony Cahill, who wasn’t yet a member when the album was recorded).

A 1992 Repertoire CD release, under the same title and cover art as the North American album, has the track listing of the European Good Friday album.

== Chart performance ==
The album debuted on Billboard magazine's Top LP's chart in the issue dated June 10, 1967, peaking at No. 180 during a five-week run on the chart.

== Track listing ==
All songs written by Harry Vanda and George Young except as noted.

=== Side A ===
1. "Friday On My Mind"
2. "River Deep, Mountain High" (Jeff Barry, Ellie Greenwich, Phil Spector)
3. "Do You Have a Soul" - (edited to a shorter length than the UK version)
4. "Saturday Night"
5. "You Me, We Love"
6. "Pretty Girl"

=== Side B ===
1. "Happy Is The Man"
2. "Make You Feel Alright (Women)" - (originally titled "Women" written by Stevie Wright, George Young)
3. "Who'll Be the One"
4. "Made My Bed Gonna Lie In It" (Young)
5. "Remember Sam"
6. "See Line Woman" (Traditional, arranged by Vanda, Young)

== Personnel ==
The Easybeats

- Stevie Wright - vocals, percussion
- Harry Vanda - vocals, harmonies, guitars
- George Young - vocals, harmonies, guitars
- Dick Diamonde - vocals, bass
- Snowy Fleet - drums

Technical

- Producer: Shel Talmy except for "Make You Feel Alright (Women)" (produced by Ted Albert).

== Charts ==
Chart (1967)	Peak position
Billboard Top LPs	180
