= The Best of The Easybeats Volume 2 =

Greatest hits album by The Easybeats
- Released: October 9, 1969
- Recorded: Between 1967 - 1968 at Olympic Studios and Central Sound Studios, London, UK.
- Genre: Rock, Psychedelic pop
- Label: Albert Productions (Australia)
- Producer: Glyn Johns, Harry Vanda and George Young.

The Easybeats Australian albums chronology
Vigil (1968)	The Best of The Easybeats Volume 2 (1969)	Friends (1969)

1975 Drum Records reissue
- The Best of The Easybeats Volume 2 Featuring Stevie Wright

Singles from The Best of The Easybeats Volume 2
- 1. "Peculiar Hole In the Sky"/"H.P. Man" Released: 25 September 1969

The Best of The Easybeats Volume 2 is the second compilation album by the Australian rock group The Easybeats. The album was first released on October 9, 1969 by the group's Australian label Albert Productions. The compilation album was released to coincide with the band's 1969 Australian tour.

The compilation was later re-issued on the budget Drum label in 1974. It has never been officially issued on compact disc or digitally. However, the songs not released on their original studio albums, can be found on CD throughout the Repertoire reissues of Friday On My Mind, Vigil and the bonus tracks of the Friends CD.

== Reception ==
Professional ratings
Review scores
Source	Rating
Go-Set	mixed

On release, the album received mixed reviews from the music press due to its use of "demo" recordings, on the album's first side. In their review, Go-Set commented: "Apart from the dubious production often the Easys are not trying to be themselves but are content to put down the song idea, perhaps even with someone in mind for them". The songs on the first side included songs Harry Vanda and George Young had given to other Australian groups, whose versions were already released before this album. Commercially, the album did poorly.

== 1975 re-release ==
The album was reissued in June 1975 on the budget label Drum records, along with the first volume. The reissue contains the same song listing, but alternate, previously unreleased versions of some titles.

- "Hello, How Are You" - an earlier, more psychedelic sounding recording than the released version.
- "Lay Me Down and Die" - this version of the instrumental track contains a lead vocal with lyrics.
- "Land of Make Believe" - an alternate mix of the song.

These versions of "Hello, How Are You" and "Lay Me Down and Die" would also appear on the 1980 compilation album Absolute Anthology. Both these songs can also be found as bonus track on the Repertoire Records CD release of Vigil. The alternate mix of "Land of Make Believe" is exclusive to the 1975 reissue.

== Track listing ==
=== Side A ===
All tracks are written by Harry Vanda and George Young except as noted

No.	Title	Originally released on	Length
1.	"Peculiar Hole in the Sky"	single A-side	3:02
2.	"H.P. Man"	"Peculiar Hole in the Sky" single	2:44
3.	"My Old Man's a Groovy Old Man"	previously unreleased – originally recorded in 1967 for the scrapped second album for United Artists. Previously covered by The Valentines in 1969.	2:24
4.	"Such a Lovely Day"	previously unreleased – recorded at Central Sound Studios. Previously covered by Rev Black and the Rockin' Vickers in 1969	3:16
5.	"Good Times"	"Good Times" single and Vigil album	3:23
6.	"Down to the Last 500"	previously unreleased – recorded at Central Sound Studios. Previously covered by Rev Black and the Rockin' Vickers in 1968	2:41

=== Side B ===
No.	Title	Originally released on	Length
1.	"Hello, How Are You"	"Hello, How Are You?" single and the Vigil album	3:20
2.	"Heaven and Hell"	"Heaven and Hell" single	2:43
3.	"Come In You'll Get Pneumonia" (Vanda, Young, Tony Cahill)	The B-side to "The Music Goes 'Round My Head" single and the Vigil album	3:46
4.	"Lay Me Down and Die"	"Lay Me Down And Die" Australian single. B-side to "Good Times" in the U.K. and U.S. The 1974 featured the vocal version of the song instead.	3:02
5.	"Do You Have a Soul?"	The B-side to "Who'll Be the One" single and Good Friday and Friday On My Mind albums	2:41
6.	"Land of Make Believe"	B-side to the "Good Times" single in Australia and from the Vigil album	3:13
