= The Definitive Series =

Compilation album by The Easybeats
- Released: September 18, 1992
- Genre: Rock
- Label: Albert Productions

The Easybeats chronology
Absolute Anthology 1965 to 1969 (1980)	The Definitive Series (1992)

The Definitive Series is a compilation album by The Easybeats. The album was released on September 18, 1992.

== Track listing ==
1. "For My Woman" (Stevie Wright, George Young)
2. "She's So Fine" (Wright, Young)
3. "Wedding Ring" (Wright, Young)
4. "Easy as Can Be" (Wright, Young)
5. "In My Book" (Wright, Young)
6. "Women" (Wright, Young)
7. "Come and See Her" (Wright, Young)
8. "I'll Make you Happy" (Wright, Young)
9. "Too Much" (Harry Vanda, Wright, Young)
10. "Sorry" (Wright, Young)
11. "Made My Bed (Gonna Lie in It)" (Young)
12. "Friday on My Mind" (Vanda, Young)
13. "Heaven and Hell" (Vanda, Young)
14. "You Me, We Love" (Vanda, Young)
15. "Happy is the Man" (Vanda, Young)
16. "Hello How Are You?" (Vanda, Young)
17. "Good Times" (Vanda, Young)
18. "The Music Goes Round My Head" (Vanda, Young)
19. "Fancy Seeing you Here" (Vanda, Young)
20. "Falling off the Edge of the World" (Vanda, Young)
21. "Land of Make Believe" (Vanda, Young)
22. "St. Louis" (Vanda, Young)
