= The Gents (British band) =

- Origin: Doncaster, South Yorkshire
- Genres: mod revival, pop rock, power pop
- Years active: 1980–1989, 2010-present
- Labels: Posh Records, Kosmik Records, Mega Records, Prism Records, Lambs to the Slaughter Records, Detour Records, Cherry Red Records
- Past members: Martin Burton (vocals/bass); Steve Chambers (guitar); Steve Kendell (keyboards); Glyn Davies (drums)

The Gents are an English mod revival band from Doncaster, South Yorkshire, active in the 1980s and reunited occasionally from 2010, significant and notable for their lower end UK chart history from 1985 to 1987.

== Career ==
The group began as a cover band, playing songs originally recorded by The Who, The Kinks, The Jam, The Lambrettas and Madness, along with original material and other contemporary covers. They attracted attention after winning a competition hosted by EMI, the prize of which was studio time at Abbey Road Studios. The result was their debut single, the double-a-sided "The Faker"/"Le Pink Pantser" in 1981 although not recorded at Abbey Road as they decided to decline the one-single deal which was the prize in favour of recording it themselves back at home in the north. The single was not a commercial success and as the vinyl record was of a limited run copies have sold for up to £100.

The band developed a live following in the UK, playing up to five times a week in working men's clubs in the North and North-East of England. They were particularly appreciated at mod events, including the 100 Club on Oxford Street and also on the 1980s scooterist scene. They released a number of singles which appeared on independent charts in New Musical Express and Melody Maker, but their biggest commercial success, a cover of The Easybeats' "Friday On My Mind" was the only one to reach the top 100 in the UK singles chart.

The Gents were active from 1980 to February 1989, having released nine 7" singles (three with accompanying 12" versions), two vinyl albums and one cassette-only sampler album. They have also appeared on several multi-artist compilation albums over the years. In 1981 the band won a "Battle of the Bands" type competition called the EMI Tetley Supergroup competition, culminating in a final at the Compton Arms in Leeds and resulting in a prize of recording time at Abbey Road Studios in London and a one-single deal with EMI. In the mid-1980s they became involved with the nationwide mod scene through Mark Johnson's The Phoenix Society of London and played at many mod events at this time, plus undertook a national tour known as the "New Direction National Tour", from May to June 1985 and named after their single release of that time. The Gents also played at the Mod-Aid all-day Band Aid charity event at Walthamstow Town Hall on 15.12.85 and were featured on the double vinyl LP recording of that event. They later disavowed Mark Johnson.

From 2010, Detour Records commenced a programme of reissuing the group's albums on the CD format as they had only ever been released on vinyl and cassette at the time of the band's recording career and this led to the band briefly reforming to play a selection of local concerts in South Yorkshire as a three-piece, without founding keyboard player Steve Kendell.

On 13 April 2018, the band played a sold-out concert billed as their final ever, at Birdwell Venue in Barnsley, to launch the final instalment of their CD release schedule, a singles' album in the form of a CD/DVD box set entitled The Rise and Fall of the Gents and also the release of a new 7" vinyl release entitled "The Unfinished Business EP", both released on Detour Records. This concert also marked the return of the previously absent founding keyboard player Steve Kendell to the lineup.

== Discography ==
=== 7" Singles ===
- "The Faker b/w Pink Pantser" – 1981 POSH001
- "Schooldays b/w True Stories" – 1982 KOS6886
- "The Gent b/w Revenge/Over Me" – 1982 MEGA1.
- "Revenge b/w Girl" – 1983 POSH007.
- "Shout! b/w The Faker" – 1985 G-7.
- "New Direction b/w You are the Sun" – 1985. GN8.
- "Stay with Me b/w In the Heat of the Sun" – 1985. GN9.
- "Give it to Me b/w At the Dance Part 1" – 1986. GN11.
- "Friday on my Mind b/w Have a Good Time" – 1986. GN12.
- "The Unfinished Business EP" – 2018. DR098.
- "The Faker b/w Pink Pantser" - 2020. DR120PD (Picture disc reissue of debut single).

=== 12" singles ===
- "Stay with Me b/w Tomorrow Never Comes (remix)/Don't Turn Away (remix)" – 1985. GN9(T).
- "Give it to Me b/w At the Dance Part 1/At the Dance Part 2/The More You Get/The Gents' Drunken Party" – 1986. GN11(T).
- "Friday on my Mind b/w Have a Good Time/Dogshit Blues" – 1986. GN12(T).

=== LPs ===
- "This Way to the Gents – cassette-only sampler album" – 1981
- "How it all Began" – 1985, GG77.
- "Waiting to be Seen" – 1987 PSM10

=== CDs ===
All are reissues of original albums and artwork, plus bonus material in order to eventually put all Gents' historical recorded and released material onto the digital format.

- "How it all Began" – (Detour) 2012
- "Waiting to be Seen" (Detour) 2013
- "This Way to the Gents" – (Detour) 2014
- "The Rise and Fall of the Gents" – (Detour) 2018

=== Compilations ===
- Rock-On : Compilation LP of finalists from the EMI/Joshua Tetley 1981 Supergroup Competition 1981. Includes "The Faker".
- 5-4-3-2-1 Go! The Countdown Compilation : Compilation LP of mid-1980s mod revival bands. Includes "The Faker".
- Dedicated - the Mod Live Aid All-Dayer : Live album of mid-1980s mod revival bands live at Walthamstow Town Hall on 15.12.85. Includes "Act Now" and "At the Dance Parts 1&2".
- Unicorn One - Beyond Tomorrow : 1987 compilation lp on Unicorn Records. Includes "Denaby Dogshit Blues".
- Unicorn Two - Modern Times : 1987 compilation lp on Unicorn Records. Includes "A Man One Day".
- Millions Like Us : The Story of the Mod Revival 1977–1989 (Cherry Red) 2014. Includes "The Faker".
- Eddie Piller Presents the Mod Revival : Compilation vinyl 2-LP and 4-CD of mod revival bands curated by DJ Eddie Piller. Includes "The Faker" on the CD version of the album only.

== Chart placings ==
| Year | Single | Chart positions | | | | |
| Year | Single | UK Singles Chart | Indie Chart | NME | Melody Maker | Sounds |
|---|---|---|---|---|---|---|
| 1981 | "The Faker"/"Le Pink Pantser" (double A-side) | – | – | – | – | – |
| 1982 | "Schooldays" | – | – | – | – | – |
| 1982 | "The Gent" | – | – | – | – | – |
| 1983 | "Revenge" | – | – | – | – | – |
| 1985 | "Shout" | – | 33 | 27 | 16 | 19 |
| 1985 | "New Direction" | – | 32 | 14 | – | 8 |
| 1985 | "Stay With Me" | – | – | – | – | 9 |
| 1986 | "Give It To Me"/"At the Dance Pts 1&2" (double A-side) | – | 45 | – | – | 14 |
| 1986 | "Friday On My Mind" | 95 | – | – | – | – |
| 2018 | "The Unfinished Business EP" | – | – | – | – | – |
