= Come and See Her =

- Australian single label

Single by The Easybeats

from the album It's 2 Easy
- B-side: "I Can See"
- Released: 4 April 1966
- Recorded: 1965–1966
- Studio: Armstrong Studios, Melbourne; EMI Studios, Sydney
- Genre: Power pop; Australian rock
- Length: 2:34
- Label: Parlophone/Albert Productions
- Songwriter(s): Stevie Wright/George Young
- Producer(s): Ted Albert

Australian singles chronology
| "Women (Make You Feel Alright)" (1966) | "Come and See Her" (1966) | "Sorry" (1966) |

U.K. singles chronology
| "Come and See Her" (1966) | "Friday on My Mind" (1966) |

"Come and See Her" is a song written by Stevie Wright and George Young. It was released as the sixth single for their Australian rock group the Easybeats in April 1966, which reached No. 3 on the Australian charts. It was the group's debut single in the United Kingdom, issued on the United Artists Records in July.

== Background ==
The Easybeats had formed in 1964 in Sydney by Dick Diamonde on bass guitar, Gordon "Snowy" Fleet on drums, Harry Vanda on lead guitar, Stevie Wright on lead vocals and George Young on lead guitar. Their second studio album, It's 2 Easy (March 1966), was produced by Ted Albert for Parlophone Records/Albert Productions. "Come and See Her" was released as the album's fourth single in April, which charted at No. 1 in Sydney and No. 10 in Melbourne – this was back-calculated in 2005 to be the equivalent of No. 3 on the national singles chart. The track was co-written by group members Wright and Young. Garry Raffaele of The Canberra Times referred to this song when reviewing their extended play, Easyfever (August), "They have turned away from the vocal gimmicks of numbers like 'Come and See Her' and concentrated on normal harmonies and relatively good arrangements." It was the group's debut single in the United Kingdom, appearing on United Artists Records in July.

== Single track listing ==
Australian release

1. "Come and See Her"
2. "I Can See"

UK release

1. "Come and See Her"
2. "Make You Feel Alright (Women)"

== Charts ==
| Chart | Peak position |
|---|---|
| Kent Music Report | 3 |
