= The Music Goes 'Round My Head =

1967 song performed by The Easybeats

- German single cover

Single by The Easybeats

from the album Vigil
- B-side: "Come In You'll Get Pneumonia"
- Released: December 1967
- Recorded: 1967
- Studio: Pye Studios, London, UK
- Genre: Rock
- Label: Parlophone (Australia), United Artists Records
- Songwriter(s): Harry Vanda and George Young
- Producer(s): Produced for Albert Productions by The Easybeats and Mike Vaughan

Australian/U.K. singles chronology
"Heaven and Hell" (1967)	"The Music Goes 'Round My Head" (1967)	"Hello, How Are You" (1968)

"The Music Goes 'Round My Head" is a 1967 song and single by Australian rock group The Easybeats, which was written by band members George Young and Harry Vanda.

== Background and releases ==
On returning from their U.S. tour, The Easybeats began work on the group's next single at Pye Studios in London. The song was influenced by the Jamaican ska music that was currently popular among London's mod scene. Much in the same way The Beatles song "Ob-La-Di, Ob-La-Da" would be the following year.

The single was released in the U.K., Australia, Brazil and New Zealand. Various versions of the song have been released. In Spain, a faster version released as the B-side to the "Hello, How Are You" single.

Although it received positive reviews from the U.K. music press, it failed to make an impact commercially.

== Track listing ==
Australia - Parlophone A-8277
U.K. - United Artists UP 1201

1. "The Music Goes Round My Head" (Harry Vanda, George Young)
2. "Come In You'll Get Pneumonia" (Harry Vanda, George Young)

== Personnel ==
=== Musicians ===
- Dick Diamonde – bass guitar
- Tony Cahill – drums
- Harry Vanda – lead guitar
- Stevie Wright – lead vocals
- George Young – rhythm guitar

=== Technical ===
- Harry Vanda – producer
- George Young – producer
- Mike Vaughan – producer

== The Saints version ==
"The Music Goes 'Round My Head"
- Australian single cover

Single by The Saints

from the album Young Einstein & Prodigal Son
- Released: February 1989
- Genre: Rock
- Label: Mushroom Records
- Songwriter(s): Harry Vanda and George Young
- Producer(s): Chris Bailey, Brian McGee, Harry Vanda and George Young

The Saints covered the song for their 1988 album, Prodigal Son, which reached the Top 50. The line-up was Chris Bailey, Barry Francis, Arturo Larizza, Iain Shedden and Joe Chiofalo on organ. It was produced by Bailey, Brian McGee and Vanda & Young. A single of the cover was released in February 1989, it was an Australian Top 40 and reached No. 19 on the US Alternative Songs chart. It also featured in the soundtrack of the 1988 film, Young Einstein

=== Personnel ===
Musicians

- Arturo LaRizza – bass guitar
- Iain Shedden – drums
- Barry Francis – guitar
- Chris Bailey – lead vocals
- Joe Chiofalo – organ

Technical

- Harry Vanda – producer
- George Young – producer
- Chris Bailey – producer
- Brian McGee – producer

=== Charts ===
Chart performance for "The Music Goes Round My Head" by the Saints
Chart (1989)	Peak position
Australia (ARIA)	39
US Alternative Airplay (Billboard)	19
