= Who'll Be the One =

- Cover of the 1967 Netherlands single

Single by The Easybeats

from the album Good Friday
- B-side: "Do You Have a Soul" (Australia), "Saturday Night" (UK)
- Released: 16 March 1967 (UK); April 1967 (Australia)
- Recorded: 1967; IBC Studios, London
- Genre: Power pop; Australian rock
- Length: 2:03
- Label: Parlophone/Albert Productions
- Songwriter(s): Harry Vanda/George Young
- Producer(s): Shel Talmy

Australian/U.K. singles chronology
"Friday On My Mind" (1966)	"Who'll Be the One" (1967)	"Heaven and Hell" (1967)

"Who'll Be the One" is a song written by Harry Vanda and George Young. It was originally recorded by the Australian rock group the Easybeats in 1967. The song was a follow-up to their successful single "Friday On My Mind". The single was a flop in the U.K., but it reached #12 on the Go-Set charts in Australia

== Single track listing ==
Australian release

1. Who'll Be the One
2. Do You Have a Soul

UK release

1. Who'll Be the One
2. Saturday Night

== Charts ==
Chart	Peak position
Australian Go-Set	12
Australian Kent Music Report	14

== Personnel ==
=== Musicians ===
- Dick Diamonde – bass guitar
- Snowy Fleet – drums
- Harry Vanda – lead guitar
- Stevie Wright – lead vocals
- George Young – rhythm guitar

=== Technical ===
- Shel Talmy – producer
- Glyn Johns – engineer
