= Volume 3 (Easybeats album) =

Studio album by the Easybeats
- Released: 3 November 1966
- Studio: Armstrong, Melbourne; EMI, Sydney
- Genre: Beat
- Length: 29:58
- Label: Parlophone/Albert
- Producer: Ted Albert; Tony Geary

The Easybeats Australian chronology
It's 2 Easy (1966)	Volume 3 (1966)	Good Friday (1967)

Singles from Volume 3
- 1. "Sorry" / "Funny Feelin'" Released: 13 October 1966

Volume 3 is a studio album by the Australian rock band the Easybeats, released on 3 November 1966. It was the third and final album from the group recorded in Australia before relocating to England.

== Production ==
Like their previous release, It's 2 Easy, this album was recorded during one of their tours of Melbourne at Armstrong Studios and at EMI Studios in Sydney. Ted Albert returned as producer with Parlophone Australia's A&R manager, Tony Geary.

== Releases ==
It was released by Albert Productions on the Parlophone label in Australia on 3 November 1966, after the band had departed for the UK. The album was only released in mono; no stereo mix was made. It was reissued by Albert Productions (this time on their own label) in the 1980s on compact disc. Reissue label Repertoire Records later released the album in 1992 with eleven bonus tracks. These included b-sides, demos, album outtakes, alternate mixes from the Good Friday album and the group's earliest recordings from the 2UW Theatre.

== Reception ==
Volume 3 would peak at #7 on the Kent Music Report charts and would end being the 21st best selling Australian album of 1966. The lead single "Sorry" peaked at #1 on the Australian Go-Set's National Top 40 in mid November 1966. It remained at #1 on the Australian Charts for 2 weeks in November 1966.

Professional ratings
Review scores
Source	Rating
Allmusic	link

== Track listing ==
=== Side A ===
All tracks are written by Stevie Wright & George Young except as noted.

No.	Title	Length
1.	"Sorry"	2:38
2.	"Funny Feelin'"	2:25
3.	"Say You Want Me"	2:32
4.	"You Said That"	2:38
5.	"Goin' Out Of My Mind"	2:38
6.	"Not In Love With You"	2:04

=== Side B ===
No.	Title	Length
1.	"Promised Things"	2:27
2.	"The Last Day of May"	1:59
3.	"Today" (Snowy Fleet)	2:16
4.	"My My My"	2:06
5.	"Dance of the Lovers"	2:58
6.	"What Do You Want Babe"	2:26
7.	"Can't You Leave Her"	1:59

1992 Repertoire Records CD reissue bonus tracks
No.	Title	Writer(s)	Length
14.	"Hound Dog" (A remix from the German album The Easybeats. Original mix released on the Good Friday album)	Jerry Leiber and Mike Stoller	3:18
15.	"Do You Have a Soul?" (A new stereo remix from the original tapes. Original mix released on the Good Friday album)	Vanda, Young	3:04
16.	"Saturday Night" (A new stereo remix. Original mix released on the Good Friday album)	Vanda, Young	2:39
17.	"My Old Man's a Groovy Old Man (Backing Track)" (Remixed stereo backing track. An outtake from the sessions for the scrapped 2nd album for United Artists in 1967. Finished version first officially released on Best of The Easybeats – Volume 2 in 1969)	Vanda, Young	2:33
18.	"The Easybeats-Medley (a.k.a. "Historeasy")" (A medley of “Friday On My Mind” / “She’s So Fine” / “Women” /”Sorry” also known as “Historeasy: Tour ’86 Souvenir Medley”. First released as a single in November 1986)	Vanda, Wright, Young	2:35
19.	"Mean Old Lovin'" (Mean Old Lovin' EP (1979). These songs were recorded late 1964/early 1965 at Ted Albert’s studio in the old 2UW George Street Theatre in Sydney)		2:10
20.	"I'm Happy" (Mean Old Lovin' EP)		1:54
21.	"Hey Babe" (Mean Old Lovin' EP)		1:55
22.	"I Don't Agree" (Mean Old Lovin' EP)		1:41
23.	"Keep Your Hands Off My Babe" (Mean Old Lovin' EP)		2:18
24.	"I'm Just Trying" (From the Raven records EP Son of Easyfever (1980). Recorded at Central Sound Studio in 1968 in London.)		2:16

== Personnel ==
The Easybeats

- Stevie Wright - vocals
- Harry Vanda - vocals, lead guitar, 12-string guitar
- George Young - vocals, rhythm guitar
- Dick Diamonde - bass guitar
- Snowy Fleet - vocals, drums

Production Team

- Ted Albert - producer
- Tony Geary - co-producer

== Charts ==
Chart	Peak position
Australian Albums	7
