= Easy (Easybeats album) =

Studio album by the Easybeats
- Released: 23 September 1965
- Studio: EMI, Sydney, Australia
- Genre: Beat
- Length: 31:46
- Label: Parlophone/Albert
- Producer: Ted Albert

The Easybeats Australian chronology
Easy (1965)	It's 2 Easy (1966)

Singles from Easy
- 1. "She's So Fine" / "Old Oak Tree" Released: 27 May 1965

Easy is the debut studio album by the Australian rock band the Easybeats, released on 23 September 1965.

== Production ==
Most of the album was recorded at EMI Studios in Sydney in two consecutive all-night sessions. It was produced by Albert Productions founder, Ted Albert. It also features their hit single "She's So Fine", which was recorded at Armstrong Studios in Melbourne with further overdubs in Sydney.

== Releases ==
It was released by Albert Productions on the Parlophone label in Australia on 23 September 1965. The front cover's artwork features a photograph by Australian photographer Ian Morgan of the group miming on the Seven Network music television series Sing, Sing, Sing. It was only released in mono; no stereo mix was made. It was reissued by Albert Productions (this time on their own label) in the 1980s on LP and compact disc. Originally released in Australia only, it would not be available internationally until the 1990s when reissue label Repertoire Records released the album in 1992 with eight bonus tracks. These included B-sides, their debut single "For My Woman"/"Say That You're Mine", outtakes, alternate mixes from the Good Friday album and a live recording of "She's So Fine" from 1966.

Professional ratings
Review scores
Source	Rating
Allmusic	4/5 stars

== Track listing ==
All songs written by Stevie Wright and George Young except as noted.

Side A
No.	Title	Writer(s)	Length
1.	"It's So Easy"		2:11
2.	"I'm a Madman"		2:52
3.	"I Wonder"	Harry Vanda	1:50
4.	"She Said Alright"	Young	2:15
5.	"I'm Gonna Tell Everybody"	Vanda, Snowy Fleet	2:04
6.	"Hey Girl"		2:10
7.	"She's So Fine"		2:08

Side B
No.	Title	Writer(s)	Length
1.	"You Got It Off Me"		2:28
2.	"Cry Cry Cry"	Young	2:02
3.	"A Letter"		1:39
4.	"Easy Beat"	Vanda	2:39
5.	"You'll Come Back Again"	Young	2:39
6.	"Girl on My Mind"		3:04
7.	"Ya Can't Do That"		2:28

1992 Repertoire Records CD reissue bonus tracks
No.	Title	Writer(s)	Length
15.	"For My Woman"		3:08
16.	"Say That You're Mine"	Vanda, Young	2:45
17.	"The Old Oak Tree"	Wright, Young, Vanda, Fleet, Dick Diamonde	3:08
18.	"Friday on My Mind" (alternate remix)	Vanda, Young	2:56
19.	"Lisa" (alternate remix)	Vanda, Young	3:17
20.	"Find My Way Back Home" (unused recording for Sing Sing Sing TV appearance)	Lambert, Pegues	2:46
21.	"No One Knows" (outtake)		2:58
22.	"She's So Fine" (live from the First Australian National Record Awards, Melbourne. 14 March 1966)		2:22

== Personnel ==
The Easybeats

- Stevie Wright - vocals, tambourine
- Harry Vanda - vocals, lead guitar
- George Young - vocals, rhythm guitar
- Dick Diamonde - bass, backing vocals
- Snowy Fleet - vocals, drums

Additional musician

- Bobby Bright – harmonica on "Ya Can't Do That"

Production Team

- Ted Albert - producer
- Bill Armstrong - engineer on "She's So Fine".
- Ian Morgan - front cover photography
- Mike Vaughan - liner notes

== Sales charts and certification ==
=== Australian Charts ===
Chart	Peak Position
Albums	4
