= Lay Me Down and Die =

- Australian record label

Single by The Easybeats
- B-side: "See Line Woman"
- Released: November 1968
- Recorded: 1968, London
- Genre: Psychedelic rock; Australian rock
- Length: 3:00
- Label: Parlophone/Albert Productions
- Songwriter(s): Harry Vanda/George Young
- Producer(s): The Easybeats

Australian singles chronology
"Good Times" (1968)	"Lay Me Down and Die" (1968)	"St. Louis" (1969)

"Lay Me Down and Die" is a song by The Easybeats released as a single in Australia November 1968. It was written by George Young and Harry Vanda. It was first released as an instrumental in September 1968 in the UK as the B-side to the "Good Times" single.

The single received poor reviews from the Australian music press, the staff writer for Go-Set magazine wrote: "The Easybeats are slowly drowning, and they are reaching for the proverbial straw, this record, a straw which can either give (a flop) or hold (a hit)." The B-side was "See Line Woman" from the Good Friday album, which had not been released in Australia at that point.

The song was later released on the compilation album The Best of The Easybeats Volume 2. In 1975, a different, unreleased version with vocals was released on the reissue of that album.

== Tracklisting ==
1. Lay Me Down and Die
2. See Line Woman
