= Peculiar Hole in the Sky =

- Australian record label

Single by The Valentines
- B-side: "Love Makes Sweet Music"
- Released: August 1968
- Recorded: 1968
- Genre: Psychedelic rock; Australian rock
- Length: 2:44
- Label: Parlophone/Albert Productions
- Songwriter: Harry Vanda/George Young
- Producer: Pat Aulton

Australian singles chronology
"The Valentines (EP)" (1968)	"Peculiar Hole in the Sky" (1968)	"My Old Man's a Groovy Old Man" (1969)

"Peculiar Hole in the Sky" is a song written by Harry Vanda and George Young. It was originally recorded by the Australian rock group the Easybeats in 1967, but left unreleased until 1969. The song would later be given to Australian rock group, The Valentines, which included singer Bon Scott, who would later join George Young's brothers Malcolm Young and Angus Young in AC/DC. The Valentines version would be released in August 1968.

== Single track listing ==
1. Peculiar Hole in the Sky
2. Love Makes Sweet Music

== Charts ==
Chart (1968)	Peak position
6PR Radio charts	34

== The Easybeats version ==
"Peculiar Hole in the Sky"

Single by The Easybeats

from the album The Best of The Easybeats Volume 2
- B-side: "H.P. Man"
- Released: 25 September 1969
- Recorded: Late 1967; Pye Studios, London
- Genre: Psychedelic rock; Australian rock
- Length: 2:55
- Label: Parlophone/Albert Productions
- Songwriter: Harry Vanda/George Young
- Producer: The Easybeats

Australian singles chronology
"St. Louis" (1969)	"Peculiar Hole in the Sky" (1969)	"I Love Marie" (1969)

The original recording by The Easybeats was released the lead single for the Albert Productions compilation album The Best of The Easybeats Volume 2. In an interview with GTK during their 1969 Australian tour, the band expressed that it was not their decision to release the single and drummer Tony Cahill stated, in reference to the singles poor sales, that "...if it had of been released 18 months ago, it still would have been hip". The song failed to reach the national top 40, but did chart with some Australian radio stations.

=== Tracklisting ===
1. Peculiar Hole in the Sky
2. H.P. Man

=== Charts ===
Chart (1969)	Position
2UW	38
4BC	40
