= Snowy Fleet =

Australian drummer (1939–2025)

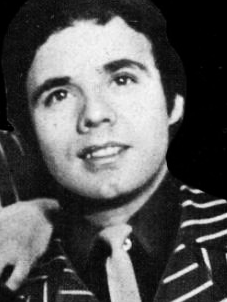
- Fleet in 1966

Background information
- Born: Gordon Henry Fleet; 16 August 1939; Liverpool, England
- Origin: Sydney, New South Wales, Australia
- Died: 17 February 2025 (aged 85) Perth, Western Australia
- Instrument: Drums
- Formerly of: The Easybeats

Gordon Henry "Snowy" Fleet (16 August 1939 – 17 February 2025) was an English-born Australian drummer, best known as the drummer with the Easybeats from 1964 to 1967.

== Early life ==
Fleet was born in Liverpool, England on 16 August 1939. He was a builders apprentice in England before moving to Australia sometime before 1964. Before emigrating, he had married his wife, Maureen (who he remained married to until his death), and had a daughter in 1962.

In the early stages of his career, when Fleet was still in Liverpool, he played drums in many Liverpool bands and sometimes shared the stage with the Beatles. Before he moved to Australia, he played in the Nomads, a band that then became the Mojos.

Fleet was born in 1939, several years before the next eldest member Harry Vanda (born 1946), but when the band became famous, his birth year was moved back five years to 1945 to make him seem younger. Because Fleet's real birth year was rarely publicised, many of the earlier online announcements of his death mistakenly reporting him dying at age 79, which in February 2025 would have made him born in 1945.

== The Easybeats ==
In 1964, now living in Australia, he met the members of The Easybeats on a train ride, and met up with them at the Villawood Migrant Hostel, where the members were staying. Due to him being a lot older, he originally took on a more managerial role before becoming their drummer. He was nicknamed "Snowy" by the band due to his jet black hair (a common trait in Australian humour that someone is nicknamed based on the opposite of one of their features). Fleet is claimed to be the member who named the band "the Easybeats".

The group consisted of Gordon (now performing as "Snowy"), Stevie Wright (vocals/originally from Leeds, England), George Young (guitar/from Glasgow, Scotland), Harry Vanda (guitar), and Dick Diamonde (bass, both from the Netherlands).

The band moved from Australia to London in early 1966. There, they recorded their biggest-selling hit "Friday on My Mind" in September the same year. Reaching number six on the British charts, it officially made the group an internationally successful band.

Fleet left the Easybeats in the spring of 1967, as he was unhappy at the amount of time he had to spend away from his wife and young children, and was replaced by Tony Cahill. A reunion took place in 1986, with the original members.

Fleet, with the group, was inducted into the ARIA Hall of Fame in 2005. He, Wright, and Vanda attended the ceremony.

In 2017, it was announced that the Easybeats were the subjects of a two-part miniseries that would air on the Australian Broadcasting Corporation (ABC). In the show, Snowy was portrayed by Arthur McBain.

== Personal life ==
In his later life, Fleet became a successful builder in Perth, Western Australia and ran a rehearsal studio in the Perth suburb Jandakot. He worked at his family's construction company, which he would eventually run until his death. In 2005, Fleet and his son Adam renovated a 1800s house at 59 Hampton Road in Fremantle, where Adam lived for a while, that features Snowy's signature in the limestone.

Fleet was the only member of the Easybeats to attend the funeral of frontman Stevie Wright in January 2016. He was married for more than 60 years to Maureen, and they had three children.

== Death ==
Fleet died on 17 February 2025 at his home in Perth, aged 85.

Owing to Fleet's death, Vanda became the last surviving member of the Easybeats.

== Discography ==
=== Studio albums ===
- Easy (1965)
- It's 2 Easy (1966)
- Volume 3 (1966)
- Good Friday (1967)
