= St. Louis (Easybeats song) =

1969 song by the Easybeats

- Singapore single cover

Single by The Easybeats

from the album Friends
- B-side: "Can't Find Love"
- Released: 27 June 1969 (UK); 17 July 1969 (Australia); 9 September 1969 (USA)
- Recorded: April 1969; Olympic Studios, London
- Genre: Progressive rock; jazz rock; hard rock; Australian rock
- Length: 3:12
- Label: Polydor, Rare Earth Records (USA)
- Songwriters: Harry Vanda, George Young
- Producer: Ray Singer

Australian singles chronology
"Lay Me Down and Die" (1968)	"St. Louis" (1969)	"Peculiar Hole in the Sky" (1969)

UK singles chronology
"Good Times" (1968)	"St. Louis" (1968)	"Who Are My Friends" (1969)

U.S. singles chronology
"Gonna Have a Good Time (Good Times)" (1968)	"St. Louis" (1968)

"St. Louis" is a song by Australian rock group the Easybeats, which was released in June 1969. It was co-written by its members Harry Vanda and George Young and recorded as their first single after signing to Polydor Records.

== Reception ==
The NME gave the song a positive review, saying: "It drives along at breathtaking pace and will knock you into submission so that you’ll be forced to buy it. I hope."

The single peaked at #21 in Australia and #57 in Canada. In the United States, it peaked at #72 on the Cash Box Top 100 and #100 on the US Billboard Hot 100 chart. It failed to chart in the UK.

During the 1969 Australian tour, band members told Go-Set they were disappointed in Ray Singer's production work. Lead singer Stevie Wright stated they "wanted it (more) funky with a lot of ad-lib(s)." He also cited a rumour that Paul McCartney had heard the song on his car radio and stopped to ask the station to "play it again" (this story is often attributed to another Easybeats' song, "Good Times").

== Track listing ==
1. "St. Louis"
2. "Can't Find Love"

== Charts ==
Chart (1969)	Peak position
Australia (Kent Music Report)	21
Canada (RPM) Top Singles	57
US Cash Box Top 100	72
U.S. Billboard Hot 100	100

== Little River Band version ==
"St. Louis"

Single by Little River Band

from the album Greatest Hits Vol. 2
- B-side: "Easy Money"
- Released: November 1982
- Recorded: 1982
- Length: 3:35
- Label: Capitol Records
- Producers: Little River Band, Ernie Ross

Little River Band singles chronology
"Down on the Border" (1981)	"St. Louis" (1982)	"The Other Guy" (1982)

Australian rock music group Little River Band recorded a cover version which was released in November 1982 as the second single from their album Greatest Hits Vol. 2. The song peaked at number 43 on the Australian Kent Music Report singles chart.

=== Track listing ===
Australian 7" (Capitol CP-867)
A. "St. Louis" - 3:35
B. "Easy Money" - 4:00

=== Charts ===
Chart (1982–83)	Peak position
Australia (Kent Music Report)	43
