= Vigil (album) =

Studio album by the Easybeats
- Released: 28 June 1968
- Recorded: 1967–1968
- Studio: EMI, Olympic and Trident, London
- Genre: Beat; psychedelic pop
- Length: 43:46
- Label: United Artists (UK and US), Albert Productions/Parlophone (Australia)
- Producer: The Easybeats; Mike Vaughan

U.K. chronology
Good Friday (1967)	Vigil (1968)	Friends (1970)

Australian chronology
Best of The Easybeats + Pretty Girl (1967)	Vigil (10/1968)	The Best of The Easybeats Volume 2 (1969)

U.S. chronology
Friday on My Mind (5/1967)	Falling Off the Edge of the World (11/1968)	n. a.

Singles from Vigil
- 1. "Falling Off the Edge of the World"/"Remember Sam" Released: September 1967 (US); 2. "The Music Goes 'Round My Head" / "Come In You'll Get Pneumonia" Released: December 1967 (UK and Australia); 3. "Hello, How Are You" / "Falling Off the Edge of the World" Released: 8 March 1968 (UK), July 1968 (US); 4. "Land Of Make Believe" / "We All Live Happily" Released: 5 July 1968 (UK); 5. "Good Times"/"Land of Make Believe" Released: 18 July 1968; 6. "Good Times" / "Lay Me Down And Die" Released: 13 September 1968 (UK), January 1969 (US); 7. "I Can't Stand it" / "Come In You'll Get Pneumonia" Released: 1969 (EU only)

Vigil is the fifth studio album by the Australian rock band the Easybeats, released in May 1968. This would be the second and final album by the band released on the United Artists Records label.

== Background ==
=== Scrapped 2nd album for United Artist Records ===
During mid 1967 the band were working on the follow-up to their Good Friday album with producer Glyn Johns at Olympic Recording Studios. According to John Tait's book Vanda & Young: Inside Australia's Hit factory, the album was to be titled Good Times. However, due to legal issues between the band and its Australian production company Albert Productions, that album was permanently shelved. Some of the surviving tracks ("Good Times", "Land of Make Believe"), as well as newly recorded ones, would be used on what was now titled Vigil (so titled as tribute to the fans who held vigil for the album's long release). Other songs from the original Good Times album would eventually be released on The Shame Just Drained compilation in 1977.

Tracks from the scrapped album included:

- "Good Times" (released on the Vigil album)
- "Land of Make Believe" (released on the Vigil album)
- "We'll Make It Together" (released on The Shame Just Drained compilation)
- "Mr. Riley of Higginbottom & Clive" (released on The Shame Just Drained compilation)
- "Where Old Men Go" (released on The Shame Just Drained compilation)
- "Amanda Storey" (released on The Shame Just Drained compilation)
- "Station on the Third Avenue" (released on The Shame Just Drained compilation)
- "Where Did You Go Last Night" (released on the Raven Records EP, Son of Easyfever)
- "My Old Man's a Groovy Old Man" (released on Best of The Easybeats – Volume 2 compilation)
- "I Know It" (still unreleased)
- "Bad News" (still unreleased)

=== Singles and recording Vigil ===
Work continued on recordings after the band returned from their US tour in September 1967. During this period, the group worked with arrangers Bill Shepherd and Alan Tew. In late 1967, they released two singles that would later appear on the released album: "Falling Off the Edge of the World" in the US and "The Music Goes 'Round My Head"/"Come in You'll Get Pneumonia" in the UK. Their next single "Hello, How Are You" marked a change in musical direction for the group with its soft pop/adult contemporary sound. The song reached #20 in the UK Charts in March 1968. However, the band have always felt the change in sound might have hurt their standing with the public. The song's co-writer, George Young, later reflected in Rolling Stone Australia: "The people in the industry dig it and it skidded in and out of the Top 20. But it was a classic mistake from our point of view. We were a rock 'n' roll band and what was a rock band doing with this corn-ball, schmaltz shit? We shouldn't have done that".

== Australian format ==
Unlike the Good Friday album, Vigil did receive an official release in the band's home country Australia. The Australian version would have the cover songs "Can't Take My Eyes Off You", "Hit The Road Jack" and "I Can't Stand It" removed and "Bring a Little Lovin'" added. The track order would also be radically different from the UK release. It was released in 1968 through Albert Productions/Parlophone. The album was only released in mono, as stereo was still not common place for locally produced records.

In New Zealand, the album was also released through Albert Productions/Parlophone, but the UK track order was kept and a stereo version was released.

In March 2017, the Australian version of Vigil was re-issued on vinyl for Record Store Day.

== North American format - Falling Off the Edge of the World ==
See: main article

The North American version of Vigil was re-titled Falling Off the Edge of the World and issued in October 1968 with a different album cover and running order from the UK release. This version was pared down to 12 songs from 14, omitting "Sha La La" and "We All Live Happily Together". A different recording of the title track (known as the "second version") replaced the more common version from the Australian and UK/European releases. This version of the album has also been released on CD, paired with Friday On My Mind on the Collectables label.

== Release and reception ==
UK release

Professional ratings
Review scores
Source	Rating
Allmusic	link
Disc and Music Echo	mixed

The album was titled Vigil, due to the long wait fans had since their last album Good Friday. It was not a commercially or critically successful album. Reviews from the time were mixed. Disc and Music Echo commented: "They have a good habit of selecting good numbers. You'll find many of them on this album. Sometimes their vocalizing gets a bit strained but their interesting orchestrations are strong on excitement.". In a modern review from All Music, Bruce Eder wrote: "There's a real sense of simply going through the motions of making music, and no originality to speak of on most of the songs". Vigil would be last the band would record for United Artists Records. The UK/European version was later reissued by Repertoire Records and featured ten bonus tracks.

Australian release

Like the UK album, the Australian release was neither a commercial nor a critical success. Along with The Best of The Easybeats Volume 2, the Australian version of Vigil was not reissued on compact disc by Albert Productions in the 1980s and 1990s.

== Track listing ==
All songs written by Harry Vanda and George Young except where noted.

=== Original UK release ===
Side A
No.	Title	Writer(s)	Length
1.	"Good Times"		3:23
2.	"What in the World"		2:18
3.	"Falling Off the Edge of the World"		3:00
4.	"The Music Goes 'Round My Head"		2:51
5.	"Can't Take My Eyes Off You"	Bob Crewe, Bob Gaudio	3:35
6.	"Sha La La"		3:11
7.	"Come In You'll Get Pneumonia"	Tony Cahill, Vanda, Young	3:46

Side B
No.	Title	Writer(s)	Length
1.	"See Saw"		2:39
2.	"Land of Make Believe"		3:13
3.	"Fancy Seeing You Here"		2:36
4.	"Hello, How Are You"		3:20
5.	"Hit the Road Jack"	Percy Mayfield	2:57
6.	"We All Live Happily Together"		4:05
7.	"I Can't Stand It"	Lester Chambers	2:57

1992 Repertoire Records CD reissue bonus tracks
No.	Title	Writer(s)	Length
15.	"Good Times" (UK single version)		3:22
16.	"Lay Me Down and Die" (Instrumental Version – b-side to "Good Times")		3:02
17.	"Lay Me Down and Die" (Vocal Version)		2:52
18.	"Bring A Little Lovin'" (demo – originally released on the Australian version of Vigil)		2:20
19.	"The Music Goes Round My Head" (Fast version – b-side to "Hello, How Are You" in Spain)		2:16
20.	"Hello How Are You" (Original First Version)		4:03
21.	"Come in You'll Get Pneumonia" (First Version – B-side to "The Music Goes Round My Head" in UK)	Cahill, Vanda, Young	3:26
22.	"Falling Off the Edge of World" (Second Version – b-side to "Hello, How Are You" in UK)		2:36

=== Australian 1968 release ===
Side A
No.	Title	Length
1.	"Good Times"	3:23
2.	"See Saw"	2:39
3.	"Fancy Seeing You Here"	2:36
4.	"Sha La La"	3:11
5.	"What in the World"	2:18
6.	"Bring a Little Lovin'"	2:25

Side B
No.	Title	Writer(s)	Length
1.	"Land Of Make Believe"		3:13
2.	"We All Live Happily Together"		4:05
3.	"Falling Off the Edge of the World"		3:00
4.	"The Music Goes Round My Head"		2:51
5.	"Come In You'll Get Pneumonia"	Cahill, Vanda, Young	3:46
6.	"Hello How Are You"		3:20

== Personnel ==
=== The Easybeats ===
- Stevie Wright – vocals
- Harry Vanda – vocals, lead guitar
- George Young – vocals, rhythm guitar
- Dick Diamonde – bass guitar
- Tony Cahill – drums

=== Additional musicians ===
- Steve Marriott – vocals on "Good Times"
- George Alexander – vocals on "Come In You'll Get Pneumonia"
- Freddy Smith - drums on “Good Times” and “Land of Make Believe”
- Nicky Hopkins - piano on "Good Times"

=== Production ===
- The Easybeats – producer
- Mike Vaughan – producer
- Glynn Johns – producer
