= The Shame Just Drained =

Compilation album by The Easybeats
- Released: October 10, 1977
- Recorded: 1965–1968
- Genre: Rock
- Label: Albert Productions
- Producer: Ted Albert, Shel Talmy, Glyn Johns, Harry Vanda and George Young
- Compiler: Glenn A. Baker

The Easybeats chronology
The Best of The Easybeats Volume 2 (1969)	The Shame Just Drained (1977)	Absolute Anthology 1965 to 1969 (1980)

Professional ratings
Review scores
Source	Rating
Allmusic	3/5 stars

The Shame Just Drained or The Shame Just Drained: The Vanda & Young Collection Vol. 1 is a compilation album consisting of studio outtakes, songs from Vigil, the scrapped second album for United Artist Records, demos and rarities by the Australian rock band The Easybeats.

== The Vanda & Young Collection and Release ==
Despite the album's subheading of The Vanda & Young Collection Vol. 1, there has yet to be a second volume released. In 1976, Albert Productions released a compilation album titled The Vanda & Young Story Volume 1. This album has the same font as on The Shame Just Drained cover. Like The Shame Just Drained, The Vanda & Young Story also did not have a second volume released. The album was first released on October 10, 1977, by Albert Productions. It was later reissued by Repertoire Records and included nine more tracks.

== Track listing ==
All songs written by Harry Vanda & George Young except as noted.

Side A
No.	Title	Writer(s)	Length
1.	"Little Queenie" (one of the band's first recordings)	Chuck Berry	2:41
2.	"Baby I'm a Comin'" (rejected recording from the EMI Studios, London sessions)	Vanda, Young, Stevie Wright	2:02
3.	"Lisa"		3:14
4.	"I'm On Fire" (demo)		2:22
5.	"Wait a Minute" (demo)		2:42
6.	"We'll Make It Together" (from the scrapped 2nd UK album)		2:10
7.	"Peter" (demo)		3:02

Side B
No.	Title	Length
1.	"Me and My Machine" (demo)	2:28
2.	"The Shame Just Drained" (demo)	2:43
3.	"Mr. Riley of Higginbottom & Clive" (from the scrapped 2nd UK album)	2:31
4.	"Kelly" (demo)	3:17
5.	"Where Old Men Go" (from the scrapped 2nd UK album)	2:33
6.	"Johnny No-One" (demo)	2:31
7.	"Amanda Storey" (from the scrapped 2nd UK album)	2:48
8.	"Station on the Third Avenue" (from the scrapped 2nd UK album)	2:58

1992 Repertoire Records CD reissue bonus tracks
No.	Title	Writer(s)	Length
16.	"Do You Have a Soul"" (3rd Version)		3:07
17.	"Check the Bassline" (basic track of "Where Did You Go Last Night")		2:59
18.	"Watch Me Burn" (demo)		3:22
19.	"Where Did You Go Last Night" (from the scrapped 2nd UK album)		2:52
20.	"Heaven and Hell" (censored U.S. single version)	Vanda, Young	2:43
21.	"Happy Is the Man" (alternate remix)		2:42
22.	"Land of Make Believe" (mono album mix)		3:16
23.	"Coke Jingle, No.1" (jingle recorded for Coca-Cola in 1966. To the tune of "Come and See Her")	Wright, Young	1:05
24.	"Coke Ads #2 & 3" (two jingles recorded for Coca-Cola in 1966 and 1969.)	Wright, Young and Vanda, Young	2:15
