= Friends (Easybeats album) =

Studio album by the Easybeats
- Released: February 1970
- Recorded: April & August 1969
- Studios: Harry Vanda and George Young's home studio, London; Olympic, London
- Genre: Rock and roll
- Length: 38:01
- Label: Polydor
- Producers: Harry Vanda; George Young; Ray Singer ("St. Louis")

The Easybeats chronology
Vigil (1969)	Friends (1970)	The Shame Just Drained (1977)

The Easybeats Australian chronology
The Best of The Easybeats Volume 2 (1969)	Friends (1970)	Friday On My Mind (1970)

Singles from Friends
- 1. "St. Louis" / "Can't Find Love" Released: 27 June 1969; 2. "I Love Marie" / "Gonna Make It" Released: 30 October 1969; 3. "Who Are My Friends" / "Rock and Roll Boogie" Released: 17 April 1970; 4. "Rock and Roll Boogie" / "Woman You're On My Mind" Released: May 1970

Friends is the sixth and final studio album by the Australian rock band the Easybeats. It was released in early 1970 as part of the group's new recording contract with Polydor Records. It would be the only album Polydor released of the band as they broke up before its release.

== History & Production ==
In 1969, the group parted ways with their production company Albert Productions and their international record company United Artists Records. After signing with Polydor Records, the Easybeats teamed up with producer Ray Singer for the single "St. Louis" and its B-side "I Can't Find Love". The single failed to chart in the UK, but reached #21 on the Go-Set Charts in their home country of Australia.

In August the band's key songwriters, Harry Vanda and George Young, took over a small recording studio located in an apartment in Moscow Road, London. The studio was previously used for recording jingles for pirate radio. The pair used the studios to record various demos for other artists, sometimes using other members of the Easybeats to contribute instrumentation and vocals. These demo recordings, along with the two songs recorded with Ray Singer were released by Polydor as Friends in the UK and Australia.

== Release ==
The album was originally advertised in the Australian music magazine, Go-Set during the group's 1969 Australian tour as a yet untitled upcoming release from Polydor Records. However, the band disbanded at the end of the tour. In February 1970 the album was listed on the new release schedule as being the group's final album.

Between Australia and the UK there are two different versions of the song "Friends". On the Australian LP, the song is a faster-paced version sung by George Young (titled "Friends") while in the U.K. it is a slower ballad sung by Harry Vanda titled "Who Are My Friends". Vanda's "Who Are My Friends" was released as a single in the UK and Australia (under the same title as George's "Friends"). The album was released in Europe and Canada as Holding On and was due for U.S. release under the title Easy Ridin' through Rare Earth Records. This release would be canceled.

It was reissued on vinyl in 1980 in Australia as part of the Rock Legends series. Repertoire Records released the album on compact disc twice (1992 and 2006). The band's Australian record company, Albert Productions, left the album out of their The Complete Easybeats box set.

Professional ratings
Review scores
Source	Rating
Allmusic	2/5 stars

== Reception ==
In a contemporary review The Sun Herald's Gil Wahlquist noted the "commercial English sound" of the album and that "everything is energy and vocal power from the opening "St. Louis" through to "Woman, You're On My Mind"". In an article in Go-Set, singer Stevie Wright noted the band were disappointed in the Ray Singer's production of the lead single St. Louis, saying "It ended up nothing like we envisaged it" and that they wanted it more "funky with lots of ad-libs".

Retrospective reviews have been less kind to the album. Pointing out the short comings of the demo recordings. AllMusic's Ritchie Unterberger noted that " The least successful songs are the forced rock & roll boogies, with overwrought vocals from lead singer Stevie Wright. The more pensive tracks, like the title tune, have an oddly compelling, hollow feel of resignation bordering on gloom that starkly contrasts with their more well-known mid-'60s material."

== Track listing ==
All songs written by Harry Vanda and George Young under the pseudonym Brian Russell.

=== Original track listing ===
Side A
No.	Title	Length
1.	"St. Louis"	3:13
2.	"Friends" (sung by George Young on the Australian release and Harry Vanda on the UK version which is titled "Who Are My Friends")	3:43
3.	"Watching the World (Go By)"	2:36
4.	"Can't Find Love"	3:29
5.	"Holding On"	3:40
6.	"I Love Marie"	2:38

Side B
No.	Title	Length
1.	"Rock 'n' Roll Boogie"	2:30
2.	"Tell Your Mother"	5:22
3.	"The Train Song"	3:31
4.	"What Becomes of You My Love"	3:18
5.	"Woman You're on My Mind"	4:34

On the European release Holding On "What Becomes of You My Love" and "Woman You're on My Mind" are switched around.

== Additional Repertoire bonus tracks ==
1992 Repertoire Records CD reissue bonus tracks
No.	Title	Length
16.	"Peculiar Hole In The Sky" (Australia only single)	03:00
17.	"Gonna Make It" (Instrumental. B-side to the "I Love Marie" single)	03:17
18.	"H.P. Man" (released on The Best of The Easybeats Vol. 2.)	02:44
19.	"Down to the Last 500" (released on The Best of The Easybeats Vol. 2.)	02:41
20.	"My Old Man's a Groovy Old Man" (released on The Best of The Easybeats Vol. 2.)	02:24
21.	"Such A Lovely Day" (released on The Best of The Easybeats Vol. 2.)	03:15
22.	"Who Are My Friends" (The Harry Vanda version of "Friends". Released on the U.K. release of Friends)	03:14
23.	"Look Out I'm On the Way Down" (The Harry Vanda version of "Friends". Released on the U.K. release of Friends)	02:36
24.	"Little Red Bucket" (Central Sound demo.)	02:46
25.	"Remember Sam (Alternative Mix)" (stereo remix)	02:38
26.	"Pretty Girl (Alternative Mix)" (stereo remix)	02:32

== Personnel ==
The Easybeats

- Stevie Wright - lead vocals on A1, A5 and B2
- George Young - lead vocals (A2 (Australian release), A3, B1, B3, B5) backing vocals, rhythm guitar, bass, drums
- Harry Vanda - lead guitar (A2 UK release), A4, A5, A6, B4) vocals, rhythm guitar, bass, drums
- Dick Diamonde - bass guitar
- Tony Cahill - drums, percussion

Production team

- Harry Vanda - producer
- George Young - producer
- Ray Singer - producer for "St. Louis" and "Can't Find Love"
