= Hello, How Are You =

- Cover of the 1968 Netherlands single

Single by The Easybeats

from the album Vigil
- B-side: "Falling Off the Edge of the World" [UK & Australia]; "Come In You'll Get Pneumonia" [US]
- Released: March 1968
- Recorded: Pye Studios, London, 1968
- Genre: Pop
- Length: 3:17
- Label: Parlophone (Australia), United Artists Records
- Songwriters: Harry Vanda and George Young
- Producers: The Easybeats and Mike Vaughan

Australian singles chronology
"The Music Goes 'Round My Head" (1967)	"Hello, How Are You" (1968)	"Good Times" (1968)

U.K. singles chronology
"The Music Goes 'Round My Head" (1967)	"Hello, How Are You" (1968)	"Land of Make Believe" (1968)

U.S. singles chronology
"Falling Off the Edge of the World" (1967)	"Hello, How Are You" (1968)	"Gonna Have a Good Time (Good Times)" (1968)

"Hello, How Are You" is a 1968 song and single by Australian rock group the Easybeats, which was written by band members George Young and Harry Vanda.

== Background ==
The choice to release "Hello, How Are You" was that of the band's manager Mike Vaughan. The melodramatic ballad was different from anything the group had previously released (being more known for their power pop songs). Recording first took place at Pye Studios in London. The first version of the song was arranged by Bill Shepard (known for his work with The Bee Gees). This version was more of a psychedelic pop song and was ultimately rejected (it was later released on the reissue of The Best of The Easybeats Volume 2 compilation). For the released version, the band turned to arranger Alan Tew for orchestration.

Although the song did make the Top 20 in the UK, in retrospective interviews the band regretted the impact the song had on their career. In a 1976 interview for Rolling Stone Australia, band member George Young reflected: "The people in the industry dug it and it skidded in and out of the Top 20. But it was a classic mistake from our point of view. We were a rock 'n' roll band and what was a rock band doing with this cornball, schmaltz shit? We shouldn't have done it".

The single reached #20 in the U.K. and #26 in their home country of Australia.

== Track listing ==
Australian and UK releases

1. "Hello, How Are You" ( Harry Vanda, George Young)
2. "Falling Off the Edge of the World" (Harry Vanda, George Young)

US release

1. "Hello, How Are You" ( Harry Vanda, George Young)
2. "Come In You'll Get Pneumonia" (Harry Vanda, George Young)

== Charts ==
Chart (1968)	Peak position
Australia Go-Set Charts	26
UK NME	20

The song appeared in a Dutch radio and tv commercial in the late seventies. The campaign promoted the Peek & Kloppenburg fashion brand.
