= Land of Make Believe (Easybeats song) =

- Cover of the 1968 Italian single

Single by the Easybeats

from the album Vigil
- B-side: "We All Live Happily"; "Good Times" [Australia]
- Released: July, 1968
- Recorded: Olympic Studios, London, 1967
- Genre: Psychedelic pop
- Length: 3:12
- Label: Parlophone (Australia), United Artists Records
- Songwriter(s): Harry Vanda and George Young
- Producer(s): The Easybeats and Mike Vaughan (Uncredited: Glyn Johns)

U.K. singles chronology
"Hello, How Are You" (1968)	"Land of Make Believe" (1968)	"Good Times" (1968)

"Land of Make Believe" is a 1968 song and single by Australian rock group the Easybeats, which was written by band members George Young and Harry Vanda. It was also released on the band's fifth album Vigil.

== Background ==
The song was originally recorded during the ill-fated sessions held at Olympic Studios in London, with engineer-producer Glyn Johns, in mid-1967. Since they took place in the period between the departure of original drummer Snowy Fleet and the recruitment of his eventual successor, Tony Cahill, the group hired drummer Freddie Smith (who had previously worked with George Young's brother Alex in the group The Big Six) for these sessions, which also prominently feature the contributions of renowned keyboardist Nicky Hopkins on piano, harpsichord and Mellotron.

The song was originally intended for the group's next album, but although a full LP (to be titled Good Times) was recorded, sequenced and mastered, and a cover prepared, contractual problems that emerged soon after the sessions (and a financial dispute with Olympic over unpaid studio fees) ultimately led to the entire album being scrapped. Some tracks from these sessions, including "Land of Make Believe", were subsequently released as singles and/or were included on their 1968 album Vigil, but a number of others remained unreleased until the issue of the Raven Records (Australia) rarities compilation LP The Shame Just Drained in 1982.

Prior to their arrival in the UK, virtually all the Easybeats' songs had been co-written by rhythm guitarist George Young and lead singer Stevie Wright but, starting with "Friday on my Mind", there was a fundamental shift in the creative focus of the band, and from this point on all their output was co-composed by Young and lead guitarist Harry Vanda, who formed an enduring and hugely successful writing and production partnership that continued into the 1990s. Nevertheless, it was reportedly one of Wrights' favourite Easybeats recordings. It is also notable as one of the few Easybeats tracks to feature Harry Vanda on lead vocals.

After the band returned from their U.S. tour in September, they resumed work on the song with arranger Bill Shepherd (who also worked extensively with The Bee Gees during this period). This later version - a notably different edit, with string overdubs - runs approximately 30 seconds longer than the original version, and only appeared on the Italian release of the song and the 1975 reissue of The Best of The Easybeats + Pretty Girl.

The song would be released as a single promoting the album Vigil in July, 1968.

== Tracklisting ==
1. Land of Make Believe
2. We All Live Happily

Australian single release

1. Land of Make Believe
2. Good Times

== Charts ==
Chart (1968)	Peak position
Australian Go-Set Charts	22
