= Heaven and Hell (Easybeats song) =

- Cover of the 1967 Netherlands single

Single by The Easybeats
- B-side: "Pretty Girl"
- Released: 22 June 1967
- Recorded: Olympic, London
- Genre: Rock, psychedelic pop
- Length: 2:38
- Label: Parlophone (Australia), United Artists Records
- Songwriter: Harry Vanda and George Young
- Producer: Glyn Johns

the Easybeats Australian / UK singles chronology
"Who'll Be the One" (1967)	"Heaven and Hell" (1967)	"The Music Goes 'Round My Head" (1967)

the Easybeats US singles chronology
"Friday on My Mind" (1966)	"Heaven and Hell" (1967)	"Falling Off the Edge of the World" (1967)

Official audio
- "Heaven & Hell" on YouTube

"Heaven and Hell" is a 1967 song and single by Australian rock group The Easybeats, which was written by band members George Young and Harry Vanda. The song marked a changed in style for the group, influenced by the psychedelic and baroque pop of the time.

== Controversy and releases ==
When the song was released worldwide in June 1967, it ran into censorship problems in some regions. In the U.K. it was banned by the BBC because of references to "discovering someone else in your bed". In the U.S., United Artists feared record stations would also object to the line "discovering someone else in your bed". To play it safe, a censored version was recorded with a replacement line "discovering that your love has gone dead". The song appeared in Australia, briefly, in censored form but was soon released uncensored.

The song performed disappointingly in the U.S. and U.K. It charted in the U.S. on the Cashbox and Record World charts at #92 and #96 respectively. In the U.K. it reached #55 on Record Retailer's charts. In their home country of Australia it did much better, reaching #14 in Go-Set.

== Track listing ==
Australia - Parlophone A-8224, U.K. - United Artists UP 1183, U.S. - United Artists UA 50187

1. "Heaven And Hell" ( Harry Vanda, George Young) – 2:35
2. "Pretty Girl " (Harry Vanda, George Young) – 2:28

== Charts ==
Weekly chart performance for "Heaven and Hell"
Chart (1967)	Peak position
Australia (Go-Set Top 40)	14
Australia (Kent Music Report)	8
Canada (RPM 100)	97
Norway (Ti i skuddet)	11
UK (Record Retailer Breakers List)	55
US Cash Box Top 100	92
US Record World 100 Top Pops	96
