= Falling Off the Edge of the World =

- Cover of the 1967 German single

Single by The Easybeats

from the album Vigil
- B-side: "Remember Sam"
- Released: 5 September 1967
- Recorded: August 1967, A&M Studios, New York City, U.S.
- Genre: Rock
- Length: 2:38
- Label: Parlophone (Australia), United Artists Records
- Songwriters: Harry Vanda and George Young
- Producers: The Easybeats, Mike Vaughan

U.S. singles chronology
"Heaven and Hell" (1967)	"Falling Off the Edge of the World" (1967)	"Hello, How Are You" (1968)

"Falling Off the Edge of the World" is a 1967 song and single by Australian rock group The Easybeats, which was written by band members George Young and Harry Vanda.

== Composition and recording ==
Vanda and Young biographer John Tait notes the song as one of "profound sadness". The song was recorded in New York, during the group's first U.S. tour.

== Releases ==
The single was released as a single in the U.S., Germany and the Netherlands in September 1967. In other countries, it was a B-side. Various versions of the song have been released. In the U.K. a faster version that was arranged by composer Bill Shepherd was released as the B-side to the "Hello, How Are You" single.

It has been often reported that musician Lou Reed was a fan of the song and played the single frequently on the Max's Kansas City jukebox. He was quoted as saying it was "one of the most beautiful records ever made".

== Track listing ==
U.S. - United Artists UA 50206 released: 5 September 1967

1. "Falling Off the Edge of the World (Seeing You With Him)" ( Harry Vanda, George Young) – 2:35
2. "Remember Sam" (Harry Vanda, George Young) – 2:28

== Charts ==
Weekly chart performance for "Falling Off the Edge of the World"
Chart (1967)	Peak position
US Cash Box Looking Ahead	138
US Record World Singles Coming Up	136
