= Friday on My Mind =

- Norwegian picture sleeve

Single by the Easybeats

from the album Good Friday
- B-side: "Made My Bed, Gonna Lie in It"
- Released: 14 October 1966
- Recorded: 8 September 1966
- Studio: IBC, London
- Genre: Garage rock; proto-punk; psychedelia; power pop
- Length: 2:47
- Label: United Artists
- Songwriter: Vanda & Young
- Producer: Shel Talmy

The Easybeats Australian singles chronology
"Sorry" (1966)	"Friday on My Mind" (1966)	"Who'll Be the One" (1967)

The Easybeats UK singles chronology
"Come and See Her" (1966)	"Friday on My Mind" (1966)	"Who'll Be the One" (1967)

The Easybeats US singles chronology
"Make You Feel Alright (Women)" (1966)	"Friday on My Mind" (1966)	"Heaven and Hell" (1967)

Music video
- "Friday on My Mind" on YouTube

Audio sample
- "Friday on My Mind": file; help

"Friday on My Mind" is a song by the Australian rock group the Easybeats. Written by band members George Young and Harry Vanda, the track became a worldwide hit, reaching No. 16 on the Billboard Hot 100 chart in May 1967 in the US, No. 1 on the Dutch Top 40 chart, No. 1 in Australia and No. 6 on the UK singles chart, as well as charting in several other countries. In 2001, it was voted "Best Australian Song" of all time by the Australasian Performing Right Association (APRA) as determined by a panel of 100 music industry personalities. In 2007, "Friday on My Mind" was added to the National Film and Sound Archive's Sounds of Australia registry.

== Composition ==
The minor-key verses of "Friday on My Mind" depict the tedium and drudgery of the work week, taking each day at a time ("Monday morning feels so bad/Coming Tuesday I feel better"). These verses are adorned with a distinctive guitar figure. The build-up to the chorus features a slowly rising vocal, culminating with a shout of "Cos I'll have Friday on my mind!", and launching into a major-key refrain celebrating the pleasures of the weekend in the city.

Though the song has long been termed a "working class anthem", George Young maintained it had "more to do with their outlook on the world than any class statement". According to Harry Vanda, the track's distinctive guitar opening was inspired by a film performance featuring the Swingle Singers: "It went tudutudutudu, which made us all laugh. In the train back from the gig, we were imitating them and suddenly it sounded good. They became the first notes of 'Friday on My Mind'."

== Release and aftermath ==
In addition to its 7" single release in October 1966, the song was issued in the United Kingdom on the band's first album for United Artists titled Good Friday which was also released in North America under the song's title in 1967. In Australia the song was released instead with its B-side, "Made My Bed (Gonna Lie in It)", on the greatest hits package The Best of The Easybeats + Pretty Girl in 1967 and an EP named after the track in September 1967, with the tracks "Sorry", "Who'll Be the One" and "Made My Bed, Gonna Lie in It". A 2005 re-release on CD single, along with "Remember Sam", "Pretty Girl" and "Made My Bed, Gonna Lie in It", featured a cover (pictured right) based on an earlier French sleeve.

On 28 May 2001, the Australasian Performing Right Association (APRA) celebrated its 75th anniversary by naming the Best Australian Songs of all time, as decided by a 100 strong industry panel, with "Friday on My Mind" being selected as the No.1 song on the list. At the APRA Music Awards of 2001 ceremony, You Am I performed "Friday on My Mind" with Harry Vanda of the Easybeats guesting on guitar and Ross Wilson of Daddy Cool performed the No. 2 listed song "Eagle Rock", while Midnight Oil's "Beds Are Burning", the No. 3 listed song, was shown on video.

"Friday on My Mind" was ranked No. 10 out of 2006 songs featured in the Triple M Essential 2006 Countdown. In the series 20 to 01, it was No. 1 on the "Greatest Aussie Songs" show.

The song is heard in the Australian films One Night Stand (1984), and December Boys (2007).

In January 2018, as part of Triple M's "Ozzest 100", the 'most Australian' songs of all time, "Friday on My Mind" was ranked No. 25.

== Charts ==
Charts (1966–1967)	Peak position
Austria	16
Australia (Go-Set)	1
Canada (RPM)	13
Finland (Suomen Virallinen)	16
Germany	10
Netherlands (Dutch Top 40)	1
New Zealand (Listener)	2
Ireland (IRMA)	13
UK Charts	6
US Billboard Hot 100	16

== Track listing ==
1. "Friday on My Mind" (Harry Vanda, George Young) – 2:47
2. "Made My Bed (Gonna Lie in It)" (Young) – 2:20

== Personnel ==
=== Musicians ===
- Stevie Wright – lead vocals
- Harry Vanda – lead guitar, backing vocals
- George Young – rhythm guitar, backing vocals
- Dick Diamonde – bass guitar
- Gordon "Snowy" Fleet – drums

=== Technical ===
- Shel Talmy – producer
- Glyn Johns – engineer

== Cover versions ==
The song has been covered many times:

- Initially by Tages, who released the song for their November 1966 album Extra Extra.
- The Shadows recorded an instrumental version of the song on their 1967 album Jigsaw.
- The song was also performed by Romanian band Phoenix on their first EP, Vremuri ("Old times") in 1968.
- David Bowie recorded a version on his 1973 RCA covers album Pin Ups; for Harry Vanda, it was "the only cover I ever liked".
- Also in 1973, San Francisco–based Earth Quake covered the song, which was released as the first-ever single on the Beserkley Records label and later included on their 1975 album Rocking the World. The live recording by Earth Quake was well known in Cleveland in the late 1970s, as one of three songs played each Friday at 6.00pm by leading rock radio station WMMS to mark the start of the weekend.
- Peter Frampton recorded a version on his “Breaking All the Rules” album released on 14 May 1981 by A&M Records.

== Other covers ==
Other acts who have covered the song include: John Alan Daubert

- Chilly
- The Dukes (Dutch band)
- Finnish singer-songwriter Hector_(musician) had a translated version "Perjantai on mielessäin"
- Gary Moore
- Peter Doyle
- Richard Thompson (1000 Years of Popular Music)
- Ben Lee
- Blue Öyster Cult
- the Kursaal Flyers
- The New Orleans–based band The Cold
- The punk band London, whose version was recorded by producer Simon Napier-Bell in the same recording studios (IBC Studios in London) where the Easybeats had cut the original. South Yorkshire mod revival band the Gents released "Friday on My Mind" as a single in 1986 and reached No. 95 in the UK national chart with the release.
- In July 2014, alternative rock band Residual Kid released a cover of the song as a charity single.
