= Sorry (Easybeats song) =

- Australian single

Single by The Easybeats

from the album Volume 3
- B-side: "Funny Feelin'"
- Released: 13 October 1966
- Recorded: 1966, Sydney
- Genre: Rock
- Length: 2:35
- Label: Parlophone
- Songwriters: Stevie Wright; George Young
- Producer: Ted Albert

The Easybeats Australian singles chronology
"Come and See Her" (1966)	"Sorry" (1966)	"Friday On My Mind" (1966)

Music video
- "Sorry" on YouTube

"Sorry" is a 1966 song and single by Australian rock group The Easybeats, which was written by band members George Young and Stevie Wright. It peaked at #1 on the Australian Go-Set's National Top 40 in mid November 1966. It remained at #1 on the Australian Charts for 2 weeks in November 1966.

== Releases ==
In addition to its 7" single release in October 1966, the song was issued on the Easyfever EP in September 1967, along with the tracks "Friday On My Mind", "Who'll Be the One" and "Made My Bed, Gonna Lie in It". It was also the lead track on the Easybeat's third and last LP Volume 3, which they recorded in Australia, prior to moving to England.

An adaptation by American alternative rock group The Three O'Clock appears on the album Sixteen Tambourines (1983) and has been featured in the live performances of the band in the 2013 tour. Bassist Michael Quercio introduces it as part of the Australian influence on the band.

== Track listing ==
Parlophone Single Cat. A-8224

1. "Sorry" ( Stevie Wright, George Young) – 2:35
2. "Funny Feelin' " (Stevie Wright, George Young) – 2:28

== Chart performance ==
=== Weekly charts ===
Chart (1966–67)	Peak position
Australia (Go-Set)	1
Australia (Kent Music Report)	1
New Zealand (Listener)	4

=== Year-end charts ===
Chart (1966)	Peak position
Australia (Kent Music Report)	21
