= Good Times (The Easybeats song) =

Easybeats song

Single by The Easybeats

from the album Vigil
- B-side: "Lay Me Down and Die" (instrumental)(UK)
- Released: 18 July 1968 (Australia); 13 September 1968 (UK)
- Recorded: June to August 1967
- Studio: Olympic Studios, South West London
- Genre: Rock
- Length: 3:23
- Label: Parlophone A-8406 (Australia); United Artists 67127 (Germany); UP 2243 (UK)
- Songwriters: George Young, Harry Vanda
- Producers: The Easybeats, Mike Vaughan & Glyn Johns (uncredited).

Australian singles chronology
"Hello, How Are You" (1967)	"Good Times" (1968)	"Lay Me Down and Die" (1968)

U.K. singles chronology
"Land of Make Believe" (1968)	"Good Times" (1968)	"St. Louis" (1969)

U.S. singles chronology
"Hello, How Are You" (1967)	"Gonna Have a Good Time (Good Times)" (1968)	"St. Louis" (1969)

"Good Times" (a.k.a. "Gonna Have a Good Time") is a song by the Australian rock band the Easybeats, written by George Young and Harry Vanda. It was released in June 1968 on their album Vigil, and as a single in July 1968 through Parlophone. It features guest vocals by Steve Marriott of Small Faces, and piano by Nicky Hopkins. The original Easybeats recording reached #22 in Australia. When broadcast by BBC radio, it was reportedly heard by Paul McCartney on his car radio; McCartney apparently rang the station immediately to request a repeat playing.

The song has been covered by Australian and international artists; in 1987, a version by INXS, featuring Jimmy Barnes, was included on the soundtrack of the film The Lost Boys and was a top 50 Billboard Hot 100 hit in the United States. It was also interpolated by Meat Loaf on his 1995 song "Runnin' for the Red Light (I Got a Life)" from his album Welcome to the Neighbourhood.

== Notable cover versions ==
"Good Times"

Single by Jimmy Barnes and INXS

from the album The Lost Boys: Original Motion Picture Soundtrack
- Released: December 1986
- Recorded: 1986
- Genre: Rock
- Length: 3:53
- Label: Mushroom
- Songwriters: George Young, Harry Vanda
- Producer: Andrew Farriss

INXS singles chronology
"Listen Like Thieves" (1986)	"Good Times" (1986)	"Need You Tonight" (1987)

Jimmy Barnes singles chronology
"Ride the Night Away" (1986)	"Good Times" (1986)	"Too Much Ain't Enough Love" (1987)

=== The Clingers ===
"Good Times" was recorded and released in 1969 as "Gonna Have a Good Time Tonight" by the Clingers, a Utah band comprising four Mormon sisters. The song was produced by Kim Fowley for Columbia Records but failed to chart. The Clingers are regarded as the first all female rock band that played their own instruments.

=== Shocking Blue ===
"Good Times" was covered by Dutch rock band Shocking Blue, on their eighth and final album of the same name released in 1974.

=== Quartz ===
The NWOBHM heavy metal band Quartz released a live cover version of this song on their 1980 released live album Live Quartz. In 2013 the band also released a studio version of the song on their self-produced compilation Back in the Band – Live and Revisited.

=== INXS & Jimmy Barnes ===
Australians INXS and Jimmy Barnes released a version in December 1986, which was engineered by Al Wright and appeared in the 1987 Joel Schumacher film The Lost Boys. This version reached No. 1 in New Zealand and No. 2 in Australia, as well as obtaining chart positions in the US (where it peaked at No. 47 on the Billboard Hot 100 and No. 3 on the Album Rock Tracks chart), Canada (number 74), and UK (where it peaked at number 18 on the UK singles chart in 1991). A video clip was produced featuring INXS and Jimmy Barnes performing the song, with scenes intercut from The Lost Boys. This version was also used to promote the national Australian Made series of concerts that took place between Boxing Day 1986 and Australia Day 1987.

Barnes later said, "We spent a day and a half in the studio. Michael Hutchence and myself didn't sleep the whole time we were there. It was a booze- and drug-fuelled couple of days."

=== Australian Idol 2004 cover ===
The song was performed on the Top 12 Results Show of the second season of Australian Idol in 2004. This version of the song was then released by the Top 10 finalists nearly four months after the live show. It was released as a one-track CD single and reached a peak of #53 on the ARIA singles chart.

=== Meat Loaf cover version ===
"Good Times" was interpolated by the American rock singer Meat Loaf on his 1995 song "Runnin' for the Red Light (I Gotta Life)" from his album Welcome to the Neighbourhood. This new version, credited to Vanda, Young, Sarah Durkee, Meat Loaf and Patti Russo featured significantly different lyrics.

=== Hindu Love Gods cover version ===
Hindu Love Gods covered the song on a 1986 single, but under the title "Gonna Have a Good Time Tonight". The members of Hindu Love Gods were Mike Mills, Bill Berry and Peter Buck of R.E.M., Bryan Cook, and Warren Zevon. The 7" single was released on I.R.S. Records.

=== Jimmy Barnes featuring Keith Urban ===
Jimmy Barnes reprised the song on his 30:30 Hindsight greatest hits album in 2014, with Keith Urban on guitar and vocals

=== Jessica Mauboy version ===
Jessica Mauboy covered the song on her 2016 album, The Secret Daughter: Songs from the Original TV Series.

== Charts ==
=== The Easybeats version ===
Chart (1968–1969)	Peak position
Australian Go-Set Charts	22

=== INXS/Jimmy Barnes version ===
Chart (1986/91)	Peak position
Australia (Kent Music Report)	2
New Zealand (Recorded Music NZ)	1
UK Singles (OCC)	18
UK Airplay (Music Week)	13
US Billboard Hot 100	47
US Album Rock Tracks (Billboard)	3

==== Year-end charts ====
Chart (1987)	Position
Australia (Australian Music Report)	23
New Zealand (Recorded Music NZ)	6

==== Certifications ====
Certifications for "Good Times"
Region	Certification	Certified units/sales
New Zealand (RMNZ)	Gold	15,000^{‡}
^{‡} Sales+streaming figures based on certification alone.

=== Australian Idol version ===
Chart (2004)	Peak position
Australian ARIA Singles Chart	53
