= Easyfever =

EP by The Easybeats
- Released: 4 August 1966
- Recorded: 1966
- Genre: Rock and roll
- Length: 9:44
- Label: Parlophone/Albert Productions
- Producer: Ted Albert

The Easybeats EP chronology
Easy As Can Be (1966)	Easyfever (1966)	Friday on My Mind (1967)

Easyfever by Australian rock and roll group the Easybeats was their fourth official extended play. It was issued to coincide with the band's departure for the United Kingdom. It appeared in August 1966 and reached number one on the Australian singles chart, something that had only been achieved once before by an EP. The songs on the EP did not appear on any of the Easybeats' official studio albums, however, they were included as bonus tracks on the 1992 CD reissue of their It's 2 Easy album.

== Background ==
Easyfever was named for fan reactions at the Easybeats appearances, à la Beatlemania, which Australian musicologist, Ian McFarlane described, "During the mid-1960s, amid scenes of screaming teenage girls and mass hysteria ('Easyfever'), The Easybeats managed to issue a legacy of fine beat pop." Easyfever was organised by the group's talent manager, Mike Vaughan in collaboration with "radio, TV and teen magazines." The hysteria escalated after "She's So Fine" (May 1965) reached number three on the national singles chart. To maintain their teen appeal, Vaughan had a tight grip on the group's image; he directed that "Snowy [Fleet]'s age was 'trimmed' by 5 years, Snowy and Harry [Vanda]'s marriages were concealed; visits to or from wives/girlfriends were strictly controlled, sometimes even forbidden." According to Duncan Kimball of Milesago website, "Fans followed them everywhere, routinely mobbing them at airports, hotels and venues. On several occasions the group had genuine reason to fear for their safety."

In early 1966, while the group were touring Australia, Vaughan flew to New York City to secure an American recording contract with United Artists Records. The group left for the United Kingdom on 10 July 1966. In August their label Albert Productions/Parlophone released the four-track extended play, Easyfever, which had been recorded before the group had left. It was produced by Ted Albert and reached number one on the Australian singles chart. Its most popular track, "I'll Make You Happy (Just Like Your Mama Wants)", was co-written by band members Stevie Wright and George Young, and reached number one on the local radio chart in Sydney and number seven in Melbourne.

== Track listing ==
All songs written by Stevie Wright and George Young except as noted.

Side A
No.	Title	Writer(s)	Length
1.	"Too Much"	Stevie Wright, Harry Vanda, George Young	1:46
2.	"I'll Make You Happy (Just Like Your Mama Wants)"		3:11

Side B
No.	Title	Length
1.	"A Very Special Man"	2:21
2.	"Tryin' So Hard"	2:26
Total length:		9:44

== Charts ==
Chart (1966)	Peak position
Kent Music Report	1
