= Good Friday (album) =

Studio album by the Easybeats
- Released: May 1967
- Recorded: September 1966 – March 1967
- Studios: IBC and Olympic, London
- Genres: Beat, psychedelic pop
- Length: 34:09
- Label: United Artists
- Producer: Shel Talmy

The Easybeats chronology
Volume 3 (1966)	Good Friday (1967)	The Best of The Easybeats + Pretty Girl (1967)

Singles from Good Friday
- 1. "Friday on My Mind" / "Made My Bed, Gonna Lie in It" Released: 14 October 1966; 2. "Who'll Be the One" / "Saturday Night" Released: 17 March 1967

Good Friday is the fourth studio album by the Australian rock band the Easybeats, released in May 1967. It was the first album released after the band signed an international recording deal with United Artists Records. The original UK album was released in May 1967. Although "Friday on My Mind" was a big single in the UK, the album failed to make the top 40.

== History ==
In August 1966, the band relocated from Australia to London after being signed to United Artists Records. Their first recordings in England was to deliver a single to United Artists, using their long-time producer and head of their production company, Ted Albert. The band recorded a number of songs with Ted Albert at EMI's Abbey Road Studios which included "Baby, I'm Coming" and "Mandy". However these were rejected by United Artists and Albert was removed as producer and replaced with freelance producer Shel Talmy, who had achieved great success with his production for the Who and the Kinks (both "Baby, I'm Coming" and "Mandy" would be later released in Australia on The Shame Just Drained and Son of Easyfever successively). United Artists also felt that the band's song writing was too "unsophisticated" for the competitive UK market. The label had already released the Wright/Young composition "Come And See Her" as a single in the UK on 15 July that same year and it had not sold well. Dutch-born Vanda, now having a stronger grasp of English, replaced Wright as Young's song writing partner at this point.

After auditioning several titles for Talmy, "Friday on My Mind" caught the producer's ear as the next single. The band recorded the song with Talmy at IBC Studios, London in September. "Friday on My Mind" was released in the UK on 14 October 1966. It reached #6 on the UK Charts making it the group's first big international hit. The song charted in multiple countries: No. 1 in Australia, No. 13 in Canada, No. 16 in the US, and the Top 10 in Germany, the Netherlands and France, and sold over one million copies worldwide. It was awarded a gold disc.

After the success of "Friday", recording began with Talmy on the follow-up single. "Happy Is The Man", "All Gone Boy", "You Me We Love" were early contenders, but it was "Who'll Be The One" that was ultimately chosen. Recording on the album would continue throughout March 1967. The single for "Who'll Be The One" was released in April while the band was on tour with The Rolling Stones in Europe. It was not as successful in the UK charts as "Friday On My Mind" but reached #14 on the Australian charts.

== Release ==
United Artists Records released Good Friday in May 1967, with its US counterpart Friday On My Mind being released the same month.

Due to contractual issues, there was no official release of Good Friday in the band's home country of Australia at the time of its release. The songs "Friday on My Mind", "Made My Bed, Gonna Lie in It" and "Pretty Girl" were released on the greatest hits package The Best of The Easybeats + Pretty Girl (released to cash-in on the band's 1967 homecoming tour), while other left over songs would appear on various EP's. The US Friday On My Mind album would eventually be released on the budget World Record Club label in 1969.

The UK version was later reissued by Repertoire Records (but re-titled Friday on My Mind like the US release) and featured twelve bonus tracks.

On April 16, 2016, the mono version of the album was re-released on vinyl by Varèse Sarabande as an exclusive for Record Store Day.

== Track listing ==
All songs written by Harry Vanda and George Young except as noted.

Side A
No.	Title	Writer(s)	Length
1.	"River Deep, Mountain High"	Jeff Barry, Ellie Greenwich, Phil Spector	3:57
2.	"Do You Have a Soul" (the CD release uses the shorter 2:58 found on the Friday on My Mind album)		3:38
3.	"Saturday Night"		3:24
4.	"You Me, We Love"		3:22
5.	"Pretty Girl"		2:16
6.	"Friday on My Mind"		2:42

Side B
No.	Title	Writer(s)	Length
1.	"Happy is the Man"		2:41
2.	"Hound Dog"	Jerry Leiber, Mike Stoller	3:17
3.	"Who'll Be the One"		2:36
4.	"Made My Bed: Gonna Lie in It"	George Young	2:07
5.	"Remember Sam"		2:32
6.	"See Line Woman"	Traditional; arranged by Harry Vanda and George Young	3:14

1992 Repertoire Records CD reissue bonus tracks (under the title 'Friday on My Mind')
No.	Title	Writer(s)	Length
13.	"Heaven and Hell"		2:28
14.	"Do You Have A Soul" (Longer Version from the Good Friday album)		3:38
15.	"Women (Make You Feel Alright)"	Stevie Wright, Young	2:35
16.	"All Gone Boy" (alternate remix)		2:30
17.	"You Me, We Love" (alternate remix)		3:20
18.	"Lisa" (alternate remix)		3:06

2005 Repertoire Records CD reissue bonus tracks (under the title 'Friday on My Mind')
No.	Title	Writer(s)	Length
13.	"Women (Make You Feel Alright)" (Single Mix, 1966)	Stevie Wright; George Young	2:36
14.	"Do You Have a Soul" (Longer Version from the Good Friday album, 1967)	Harry Vanda; George Young	2:59
15.	"You Me, We Love" (from French EP UAE 36.112, 1967)	Harry Vanda; George Young	3:24
16.	"Lisa" (from French EP UAE 36.112, 1967)	Harry Vanda; George Young	3:13
17.	"All Gone Boy" (from French EP UAE 36.117, 1967)	Harry Vanda; George Young	2:32
18.	"Friday on My Mind" (Mono Single Mix, 1966)	Harry Vanda; George Young	2:42
19.	"Made My Bed Gonna Lie in It" (Mono Single Mix, 1966)	Harry Vanda; George Young	2:08
20.	"Who'll Be the One" (Mono Single Mix, 1967)	Harry Vanda; George Young	2:38
21.	"Saturday Night" (Mono Single Mix, 1967)	Harry Vanda; George Young	3:26
22.	"Heaven and Hell" (Mono Single Mix, 1967)	Harry Vanda; George Young	2:43
23.	"Pretty Girl" (Mono Single Mix, 1967)	Harry Vanda; George Young	2:17
24.	"Heaven and Hell" (Australian LP Version, 1967)	Harry Vanda; George Young	2:42

== Friday on My Mind ==
see: Friday on My Mind

The North American version was re-titled Friday On My Mind and also issued in the same month with a different album cover and running order from the UK release. This version omitted "Hound Dog" and replaced it with "Women" (re-titled "Make You Feel Alright (Women)") from the It's 2 Easy album. The US version has never appeared on CD.

== Personnel ==
The Easybeats

- Stevie Wright – vocals
- Harry Vanda – vocals, lead guitar
- George Young – vocals, rhythm guitar
- Dick Diamonde – bass guitar
- Snowy Fleet – drums

Production team

- Shel Talmy – producer
- Glyn Johns – engineer
