= Dick Diamonde =

Australian musician (1947–2024)

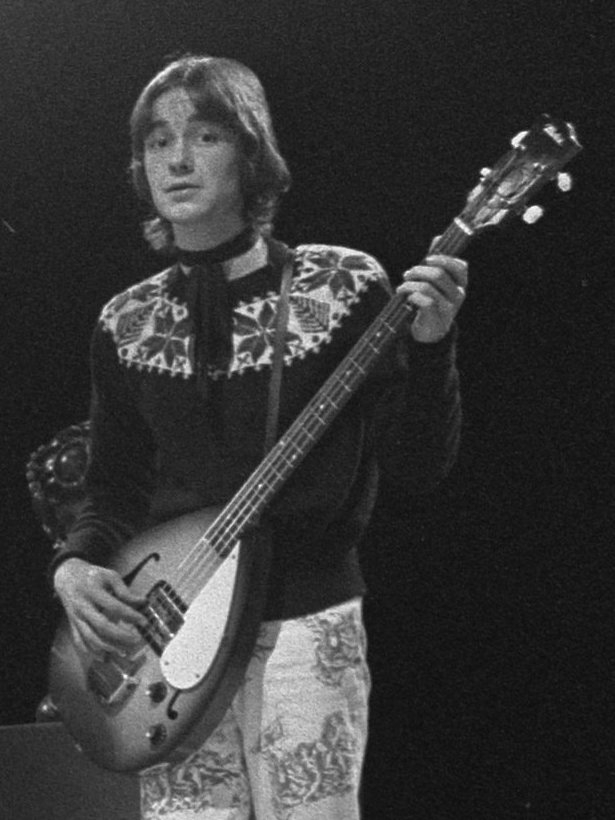
- Diamonde performing in 1968

Background information
- Born: Dingeman Adriaan Henry van der Sluijs; 28 December 1947; Hilversum, Netherlands
- Origin: Sydney, New South Wales, Australia
- Died: 18 September 2024 (aged 76)
- Genre: Rock
- Occupation: Musician
- Instrument: Bass guitar
- Years active: 1964–1969, 1986
- Labels: Parlophone, Albert

Dingeman Adriaan Henry van der Sluijs (Dutch pronunciation: [ˈdɪŋəˌmɑn ˈɑdriaːn ˈɦɛnri ˈvɑn dər ˈslœys]; 28 December 1947 – 18 September 2024), better known by his stage name Dick Diamonde, was an Australian bass guitarist. He was a founding mainstay member of the Easybeats. Diamonde, with the group, was inducted into the ARIA Hall of Fame in 2005.

== Early years ==
Dingeman Adriaan Henry van der Sluijs was born in 1947 in Hilversum, Netherlands. His father is Harry van der Sluijs (also seen as Vandersluys) and he has a younger sister. Diamonde emigrated with his family from the Netherlands to Australia when he was four years old. Diamonde was raised in a Jehovah's Witness family, living in the suburb of Villawood near the migrant hostel of that name.

== The Easybeats ==
Widely regarded as Australia's greatest pop group of the mid-1960s, The Easybeats had their beginnings in Sydney's Villawood Migrant Hostel. All of the five founding members were migrants to Australia from Europe. In mid-1964 the group was formed by van der Sluys (renamed as Dick Diamonde) on bass guitar. He was joined by fellow Dutchman Johannes van den Berg (known as Harry Vanda) on lead guitar and vocals, George Young from Scotland on guitar and vocals, and two Englishmen: lead singer Stevie Wright (Yorkshire) and drummer Snowy Fleet (Liverpool).

By October 1969, the Easybeats had disbanded and according to Young, Diamonde was "having a ball just being Dick." In that same month his mother reflected, "He has given up the faith ... We never encouraged him to follow this life. As Jehovah's Witnesses, we do not believe in creature worship ... It is not right the children idolize him." In September 1986, Diamonde participated in a reunion of the Easybeats for a series of concerts touring Australian capitals in the following two months. According to Stuart Coupe of The Canberra Times Diamonde had been "playing with a series of small-time bands up the north-east coast." The group was inducted into the ARIA Hall of Fame in 2005.

== Death ==
Diamonde died on 18 September 2024, at the age of 76.

== Discography ==
=== Studio albums ===
- Easy (1965)
- It's 2 Easy (1966)
- Volume 3 (1966)
- Good Friday / Friday on My Mind (1967)
- Vigil / Falling Off the Edge of the World (1969)
- Friends (1970)
