= The Easybeats =

Australian rock band

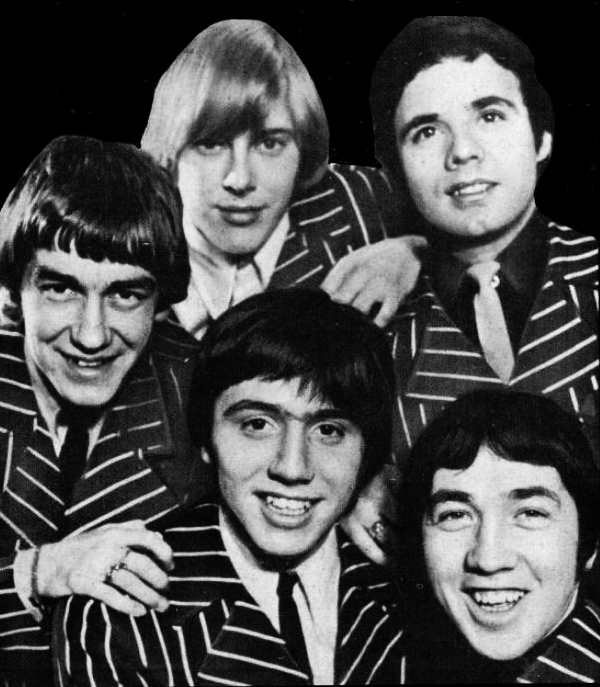
- The Easybeats in 1966. Clockwise from left: Dick Diamonde, Harry Vanda, Snowy Fleet, George Young and Stevie Wright.

Background information
- Origin: Sydney, Australia
- Genres: Rock; pop; freakbeat
- Works: The Easybeats discography
- Years active: 1964–1969; 1986
- Labels: Albert; Parlophone; United Artists; Polydor
- Spinoffs: Vanda & Young; Marcus Hook Roll Band
- Past members: Dick Diamonde; Snowy Fleet; Harry Vanda; Stevie Wright; George Young; Tony Cahill

The Easybeats were an Australian rock band that formed in Sydney in late 1964. They are best known for their 1966 hit single "Friday on My Mind", which is regarded as the first Australian rock song to achieve international success; Rolling Stone described it in 1986 as "the first international victory for Oz rock". One of the most popular and successful bands in the country, they were one of the few Australian bands of their time to lead with their original material; their first album Easy (1965) was one of the earliest Australian rock albums featuring all original songs.

The five founding members, all migrants from Europe, met at the Villawood Migrant Hostel in Sydney in 1964. They rose to national prominence in 1965 with the song "She's So Fine", which reached No. 3 in Australia. Their concerts and public appearances were marked by an intense fanaticism frequently compared to Beatlemania; this phenomenon was subsequently dubbed "Easyfever". They relocated to the UK in 1966, where they recorded "Friday on My Mind". Following its success, the band struggled to maintain international recognition. Compounded by financial and contractual issues, drug use and the increasing independence of guitarists and songwriters Harry Vanda and George Young, they returned to Australia in 1969 amid declining popularity back home and subsequently disbanded.

Lead singer Stevie Wright started a solo career and had a No. 1 Australian hit with "Evie" in 1974; he died in 2015 after lengthy battles with drugs and alcohol and years of poor health. Guitarists Vanda and Young continued as a songwriting and producing duo and produced several albums by AC/DC; Young died in 2017.

During their six-year run, they scored 15 top 40 hits in Australia, including "She's So Fine" and "Women (Make You Feel Alright)", with No. 1 hits including "Friday on My Mind" and "Sorry". They reunited for a tour in 1986. In 2005, they were inducted into the ARIA Hall of Fame.

== History ==
=== 1964–1965: formation, Albert Productions and early success ===
All five founding members were from families which had migrated to Australia from Europe: lead singer Stevie Wright and drummer Gordon "Snowy" Fleet were English-born; rhythm guitarist George Young was Scottish-born; lead guitarist Harry Vanda and bassist Dick Diamonde were Dutch-born. The band formed at the Villawood Migrant Hostel in Villawood, New South Wales, near Sydney. The families of the band members spent their first years in Australia housed at the hostel in the early and mid-1960s.

The Easybeats' first gigs were in late 1964 at a music venue called Beatle Village, located in the basement of the Courthouse Hotel in Taylor Square in Darlinghurst, Sydney. The band were inspired by the "British Invasion" spearheaded by the Beatles. The Easybeats quickly rose to become one of the most popular groups in the city. Real estate agent turned pop music entrepreneur Mike Vaughan became their manager. Through his efforts, they were signed to a contract with Albert Productions, one of Australia's first independent record production companies. The company was established by Ted Albert, whose family owned J. Albert & Sons, a prominent music publishing company. Albert signed the band to a recording contract with EMI's Parlophone label. The group recorded several songs at the 2UW Theatre, owned by the parent company of Albert Productions, J. Albert and Son. They chose the bluesy "For My Woman" as their first single. It was picked up by Sydney radio and became a minor hit, reaching No. 33 on the chart.

=== 1965–1966: rise to success and Easyfever ===
==== "She's So Fine", Easy and It's 2 Easy ====
Although "For My Woman" gained them some attention, the band felt they needed a more up-tempo song to break through commercially. Their next single, the self-penned "She's So Fine", gave them that commercial success, reaching No. 3 on the Australian chart and launching them to national stardom. Their concerts and public appearances were regularly marked by intense fan hysteria similar to "Beatlemania", soon dubbed "Easyfever" by the Australian press.

The band's follow-up single, the high-energy "Wedding Ring", released on 26 August 1965, was also a hit, reaching No. 7. On 23 September 1965, the group released its first album, Easy. It was one of the earliest albums of all original material written by an Australian rock group. All the songs were written by group members, with vocalist Stevie Wright and guitarist George Young co-writing eight of the fourteen songs on the album.

For the next single, "Sad and Lonely and Blue", the band returned to the blues based feel of "For My Woman". However, like "For My Woman", it failed to make the top 10, only reaching No. 21. Both "Wedding Ring" and "Sad and Lonely and Blue" were included on the group's second album, It's 2 Easy, released 24 March 1966. The lead singles from that album, "Women (Make You Feel Alright)" and "Come and See Her", put the group back in the top 10, reaching No. 4 and No. 3 respectively on the Australian chart. This time, Stevie Wright and George Young wrote all fourteen songs on the album. The Wright-Young songwriting team also wrote songs for other artists at this time, including "Step Back", which became a No. 1 hit for Johnny Young (no relation) in 1966.

==== United Artists Records and Volume 3 ====
In early 1966, while the group was still touring Australia, manager Mike Vaughan flew to New York City to attempt to secure an American recording contract for the band. Despite an initial lack of interest, Vaughan was able to convince United Artists Records to sign the band. Just before relocating to London in 1966, they recorded a farewell TV special for the Seven Network, titled The Easybeats (more commonly known as The Coca-Cola Special), one of the few surviving appearances from the band's career during this period. The group left for the UK on 10 July 1966.

In August 1966, Albert Productions released an EP of material recorded before the group left Australia. Titled Easyfever, it reach No. 1 on the Australian singles charts. Albert Productions then released an entire album of material titled Volume 3 on 3 November 1966. This too was a commercial success and its lead single, "Sorry", topped the Australian chart. Again, Stevie Wright and George Young wrote all thirteen songs on the album.

=== 1966–1967: international success ===
==== Shel Talmy, Vanda & Young and "Friday on My Mind" ====
After arriving in London the band recorded songs with Ted Albert at EMI's Abbey Road Studios, but these were deemed unsuitable by United Artists Records and Albert was removed as producer. The band was then teamed with freelance producer Shel Talmy, who had achieved great success with his production for the Who and the Kinks. United Artists also felt that the band's song writing was too "unsophisticated" for the competitive UK market. The label had already released the Wright/Young composition "Come And See Her" as a single in the UK on 15 July and it had not sold well. Dutch-born Vanda, then having a stronger grasp of English, replaced Wright as Young's song writing partner at this point.

After auditioning several titles for Talmy, "Friday on My Mind" caught the producer's ear as the next single. The band recorded the song with Talmy at IBC Studios, London, in September. "Friday on My Mind" was released in the UK on 14 October 1966. It reached No. 6 on the UK Singles Chart making it the group's first big international hit. The song charted in multiple countries: No. 1 in Australia, No. 13 in Canada, No. 16 in the US, and the Top 10 in Germany, the Netherlands and France, and sold over one million copies worldwide. It was awarded a gold disc.

=== 1967–1969: decline in popularity and break-up ===
==== Following up "Friday on My Mind", Easy Come, Easy Go and the scrapped album ====
On 17 March 1967, United Artists released the follow-up single to "Friday on My Mind"; "Who'll Be The One". The single was a commercial failure and did not make the UK chart (although it was No. 14 in Australia). The band was against releasing the single to begin with, as they felt it was not a strong enough track to follow "Friday on My Mind". Later that month, they toured Europe in support of The Rolling Stones.

During this period, the band was filmed by Australian director Peter Clifton for a proposed documentary for the Australian Broadcasting Corporation. Filmed under the title Between Heaven and Hell (which was later changed to Easy Come, Easy Go), the documentary was lost for nearly 42 years. It was restored, reedited and shown at film festivals in 2012.

In May, their first album for United Artists was released: Good Friday (re-titled Friday on My Mind in the US). That same month, they returned to Australia for a nationwide tour. After the tour, drummer Snowy Fleet decided to quit the band. Fleet was unhappy at the amount of time he had to spend away from his wife and young children. Returning to the UK without a drummer, the group began several recordings with a session drummer, Freddie Smith – a Glaswegian who had played with George Young's older brother Alex (stage name George Alexander) in Bobby Patrick & The Big Six.

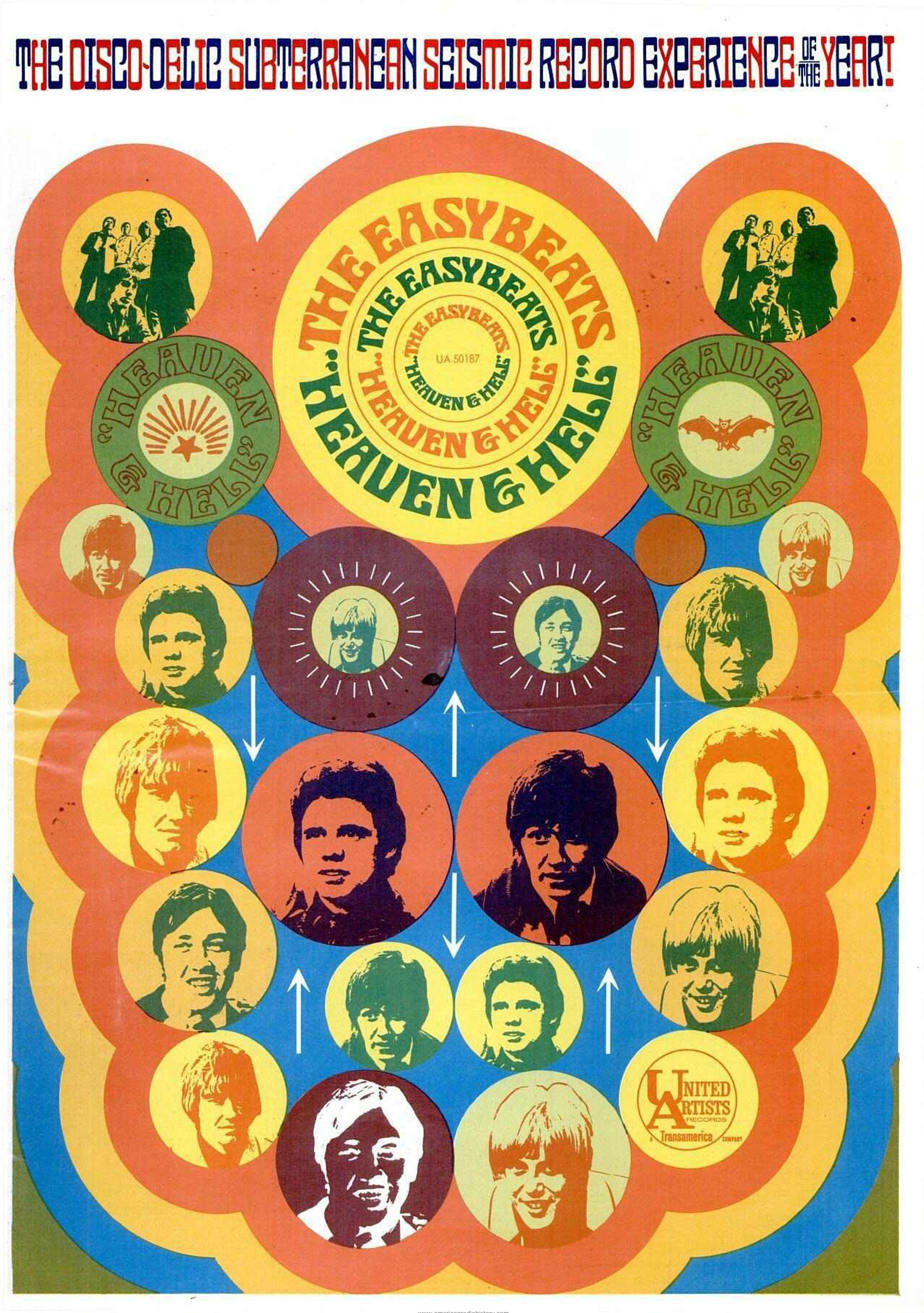
Billboard advertisement for "Heaven and Hell", 15 July 1967

During this period, the band recorded their next single, "Heaven And Hell", which marked a turning point for the group, with its sophisticated songwriting and arrangements. Vanda and Young were influenced by the current psychedelic pop, popular in the UK and US. The single was produced by Glyn Johns, who had worked as an engineer on the Shel Talmy sessions. The band also began work on a new album with Johns, most of which was recorded and prepared for issue but was never released because of the band's complicated financial and contractual problems.

"Heaven And Hell" was released in June and, like the previous single, it also failed to make a mark on the UK chart. This was due, in part, to the song being banned by the BBC. The single also ran into problems in the US, where a censored version titled "Heaven", replaced the lyric "Discovering someone else in your bed" with "discovering that her love has gone dead". In Australia the single did much better; reaching No. 8.

After extensive auditions in London a replacement drummer was found in Tony Cahill (born 20 December 1941) who had formerly played with Brisbane band The Purple Hearts. With Cahill, the band toured the US in August, supporting Gene Pitney. During their US visit, they recorded their next single, "Falling Off the Edge of the World", in New York. The single received moderate airplay in the US, but did not chart.

==== Vigil ====
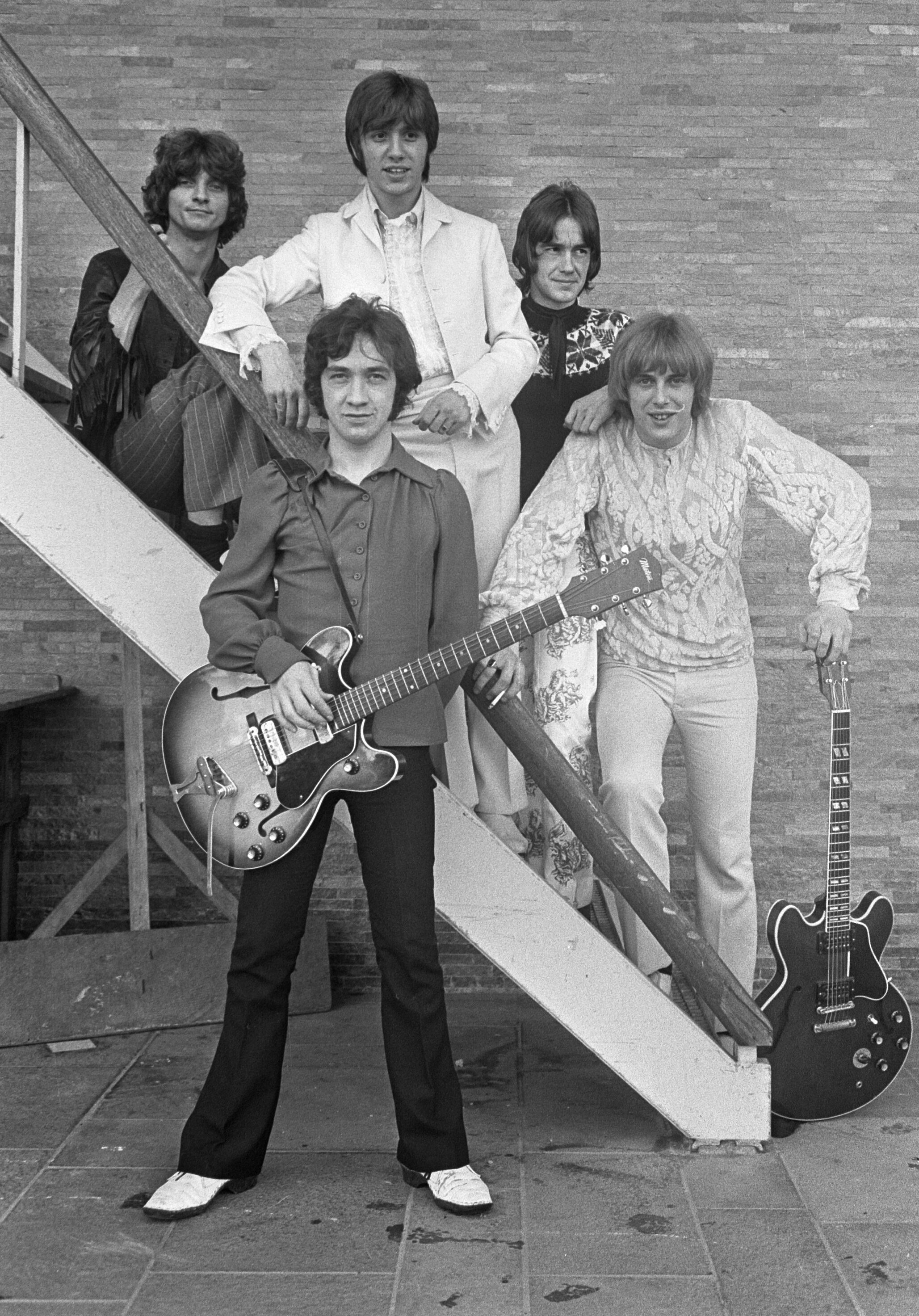
The Easybeats on the Dutch television program ...Puntje, puntje, puntje... in August 1968. Tony Cahill, who replaced Snowy Fleet on drums, is pictured left.

The band returned to London and continued to work in the studio. Their next single, "The Music Goes 'Round My Head", again written by Vanda and Young, is considered to have been influenced by the emerging UK rocksteady/ska scene. In late 1967, Vanda and Young began writing for other artists. Two of their songs, "Bring a Little Lovin'" and "Come In, You'll Get Pneumonia", were covered by Los Bravos (and later by Ricky Martin as "Dime Que Me Quieres") and Paul Revere and The Raiders respectively. Still trying to get back into the UK chart, the band moved to a more pop-friendly sound and released the soft rock, ballad "Hello, How Are You" on 8 March 1968. The plan worked and the song reached no. 20 in the UK chart. However, in retrospect, the band have cited the change in sound as a mistake, stating that it alienated the band's longterm fans.

In May, the band finally released their second album for United Artists; Vigil (re-titled Falling Off The Edge of the World in the US). The album was a mixture of recent singles, new recordings and out-takes from the scrapped 1967 album. Two of the songs recorded for the abandoned LP, "Land of Make Believe" and "Good Times", were released as singles. The baroque pop ballad "Land of Make Believe" was released in the UK on 5 July and in Australia on 18 July. Although failing to chart in the UK, it reached No. 18 on the Australian chart. The B-side to the Australian single was the next UK single; "Good Times". Released on 13 September, "Good Times" again failed to chart in the UK. An often-told story about the song is that when the track was broadcast on BBC radio, it was reputedly heard by Paul McCartney on his car radio; McCartney apparently rang the station immediately to request a repeat playing. The song featured Steve Marriott of the Small Faces on backing vocals and Nicky Hopkins on piano. In November, Albert Productions released the UK B-side to "Good Times", the instrumental track "Lay Me Down and Die", as a single in Australia. The single was slammed by critics and reached No. 59 on the Australian chart; their lowest-charting single to date.

Through late 1968, the formerly tight-knit band began to drift apart. Drugs were a factor, but the growing independence of the Vanda and Young team as a creative unit was also a major catalyst. By this time the duo were working substantially on their own and between them they could now play almost any instrument needed for recordings and had become skilled in engineering and producing their own recordings. They wrote prolifically, but many of their songs from this period remained unreleased for many years. They were also reluctant to do more than a few gigs per month, and so the band only came together for occasional performances or for 'demo' sessions at Central Sound Studios in Denmark Street.

==== New contract with Polydor and "St. Louis" ====
In 1969, the band parted ways with United Artists and their production company Albert Productions to sign with Polydor Records. In April, the group went into London's Olympic Studios to record their first single for Polydor. They teamed up with producer Ray Singer, a former member of UK band Nirvana, who had made a name for himself as a producer with Peter Sarstedt's "Where Do You Go To (My Lovely)". "St. Louis" was released on 27 June 1969, but failed to chart in the UK. However it reached No. 21 on the Go-Set charts in Australia. In July 1969, it was announced that the working relationship between manager Mike Vaughan and the group had come to an end.

To continue their work as songwriters for hire, Vanda and Young took over a flat on Moscow Road in Bayswater in London which had previously been used as a jingle studio for pirate radio stations. With modifications, it became a four-track home studio and Vanda and Young began producing demos, working mostly on their own. As with their Central Sound records, they played most of the instruments on their recordings with the other Easybeats members occasionally contributing. Nine of these demo recordings (with single "St. Louis" and "Can't Find Love") were released by Polydor as an album under The Easybeats' name as Friends. This album was released after their break-up.

==== Final Australian tour and break-up ====
In September 1969, the band undertook a short European tour and then reluctantly accepted the offer of a five-week Australian tour. The tour was reported as being a last-ditch attempt to bail the group out of its mounting pool of debts.

A number of factors made the Australian tour less than successful. Rather than playing larger venues as they did on the 1967 tour, the band was booked to play mainly smaller clubs and dance halls. Also, the band had reverted to 'no frills' hard rock whereas the Australian pop scene was preoccupied with progressive rock, soul, and bubblegum pop.

The situation was further complicated by Albert Productions' unwelcome release (against the band's wishes) of several lo-fi demo recordings on The Best of The Easybeats Volume 2. The recordings were songwriter demos sent to Albert Productions in 1967 and 1968 for other artists to record. "Peculiar Hole in the Sky" from that album was released as a single, it was originally recorded by Australian band the Valentines.

In October 1969 the band made a valedictory TV appearance in the ATN-7 Easybeats Special (which was broadcast after the tour on 2 November). After their performance at Caesar's Place Disco, Sydney, on 25 October, a wedding was held for Diamonde and actress Charlene Collins. The following day, the Easybeats travelled to Orange, New South Wales. There they made a television appearance at the CBN-8 television studios and performed a show at the Amoco Centre in Orange city centre. However, the show was interrupted by hostile audience members and was cancelled after only 20 minutes. This was The Easybeats' final performance. After the tour, the band went their separate ways.

=== 1969–present: post break-up ===
==== 1970s: Vanda & Young and Wright's solo commercial success ====
===== Vanda and Young =====
Vanda and Young returned to the UK and remained there for three years, working to pay off debts incurred during The Easybeats' years. During the period 1970-74 they recorded under various names: Paintbox, Tramp, Eddie Avana, Moondance, Haffy's Whisky Sour, Vanda & Young, Band of Hope and the Marcus Hook Roll Band. They returned to Australia in 1973 and reunited with Ted Albert and became the house producers for his new Albert Productions record label, writing for and/or producing many chart-topping acts including Stevie Wright, Rose Tattoo, Cheetah, the Angels and William Shakespeare.

They wrote and produced several major hits for John Paul Young including "Love Is in the Air" and "Yesterday's Hero", which was also a hit for The Bay City Rollers, and produced the first six albums for AC/DC (which featured George's younger brothers Angus Young and Malcolm Young).

In the period 1976-92 Vanda and Young also recorded several singles under the pseudonym Flash and the Pan which charted in Australia and the UK, including "Hey St. Peter" and "Down Among the Dead Men". They had even more success in Europe with hits such as "Waiting for a Train", "Midnight Man", "Early Morning Wake Up Call", and "Ayla", from the No. 1 albums Early Morning Wake Up Call, Headlines, and Nights in France. Singer-model-actress Grace Jones also recorded a successful cover version of their song "Walking in the Rain".

===== Stevie Wright =====
Stevie Wright went on to become a cast member of the original Australian stage production of Jesus Christ Superstar (1972–73) and then launched a successful but short-lived solo career with the hit single "Evie" and the album Hard Road in 1974, which reunited him with Vanda and Young, who produced the records and wrote many of the songs, including "Evie", an ambitious three-part suite split over two sides of a single.

In later years Wright suffered debilitating drug and alcohol problems which were further exacerbated by his self-admission to the Chelmsford Private Hospital in Sydney. Its director, Dr Harry Bailey, administered a highly controversial treatment known as "deep sleep therapy" which allegedly cured drug addiction with a combination of drug-induced coma and electroshock. Many patients, including Wright, suffered brain damage and lifelong after-effects, while others died as a result of the treatments.

===== Snowy Fleet, Tony Cahill and Dick Diamonde =====
Original drummer Gordon "Snowy" Fleet became a successful builder in Perth, Western Australia, and ran a rehearsal studio based in Jandakot, Western Australia. His replacement, Tony Cahill, remained in the UK for a time, briefly joining the final studio lineup of Python Lee Jackson as a bassist, before moving to the United States to tour with King Harvest.

Dick Diamonde moved to the New South Wales North Coast and retired from performing, after some years of singing and playing in local pubs.

==== 1980s: Solo careers and the Easybeats reunion tour ====
The Easybeats at a press conference at the Sebel Townhouse Hotel before embarking on a reunion tour of Australia in 1986.

In 1980, Flash and the Pan released their second album Lights in the Night. Their next album, Headlines was released in August 1982. This featured the singles "Waiting for a Train" which reached No. 7 on the UK singles chart and "Where Were You". The music video for "Where Were You" featured Stevie Wright as a futuristic rock star miming to George Young's vocals. Wright also provided vocals for the album. That same year there was talk of an Easybeats' reunion. Wright told Juke Magazine in 1983 "we had our lawyers working out the deal" because there was a venue interested in having them "but at the last minute they tried to change the venue and we just said 'forget it'."

In 1983, there was a talk of a solo album with work done again with Vanda and Young. Wright said the album would best be described as "classy rock 'n' roll" and the songs were about "a wide spectrum of all the experiences I've been through". He said the love songs he had were optimistic. This interview gives a good idea as to how Wright worked in the studio with Vanda and Young:

"Well, it's a three way thing. They'll sit down and say 'we've got this sort of song' and we'll discuss how we'll approach it. Obviously after this long we do have a very strong bond. I've written a couple of songs but since they're far better at it than I am, I'll let them handle that."

According to the Juke Magazine article it was "due for release later that year", however this never happened.

In January 1984, Wright was charged with attempted housebreaking days after attending Westmount drug rehabilitation centre in Katoomba, west of Sydney. He was arrested for heroin use later that month. He had been using heroin since about 1973, and, according to Wright, he remained an addict for 20 years. Also that year, Flash and the Pan's next album, Early Morning Wake Up Call, was released.

In November 1986, the original line-up reunited for an Australian tour. The tour was warmly received by critics and fans. Wright reformed the Stevie Wright Band and relaunched his live career, gigging around Australia in hotels and clubs between 1986 and 1988. In 1987, Flash and the Pan released their fifth album, Nights in France.

Vanda and Young returned to producing AC/DC on their 1988 album Blow Up Your Video.

==== 1990s and beyond: semi-retirement ====
In 1992 Flash and the Pan released their final album Burning Up The Night. Wright's substance abuse problems spiralled out of control in the 1980s and 1990s and he came close to death on several occasions, but was pulled back from the brink by his partner, Faye. In 1999 journalist Jack Marx published a much-anticipated book about Wright, entitled Sorry - The Wretched Tale of Little Stevie Wright. It was critically applauded by some reviewers - Australian music historian Clinton Walker calling it "gonzo journalism at its best", while The Bulletin later referred to Sorry as "one of the most harrowing rock books ever written". Nevertheless, Sorry earned the disdain of its subject, Wright's many fans and other critics. Internet reviewer Ken Grady (Luna Cafe, 1999) described Marx as "a self serving hypocrite" and concluded his review by observing: "The only thing that Marx has achieved is to depict himself as a very unlikeable, morally bankrupt leech."

The 2000s saw a band calling itself "The Easybeats" tour and make TV appearances around Europe. No members were in any line-up of the Australian band or played on any of the records, despite the lead singer using a similar name. In addition, another English cover band has taken the Easybeats name, while also having no members who were in the Australian band or played on any of the original recordings. In 2000, George Young produced AC/DC's Stiff Upper Lip album. It was the first time he had worked with the group without Harry Vanda co-producing.

Due to his health, Wright only performed a small number of shows in the 2000s, although in 2002 he was well enough to perform as part of the all-star Long Way to the Top national concert tour. His autobiography, Hard Road, was published in 2004. In 2007, Stevie Wright performed at the Gathering Festival in Yandina, Sunshine Coast. On 31 January 2009, Wright closed the Legends of Rock festival in Byron Bay, Australia. On 14 July 2005, the Easybeats were inducted into the ARIA Hall of Fame. Wright, Vanda and Snowy Fleet attended the ceremony.

Cahill died in Sydney on 13 August 2014, as the result of a brain tumour.

After falling ill on 26 December 2015, Wright was admitted to hospital on the South Coast of New South Wales, Australia. He did not recover and died on the evening the next day.

George Young died on 22 October 2017.

Dick Diamonde died on 18 September 2024, at the age of 76.

Snowy Fleet died on 18 February 2025, at the age of 85.

== Popular culture ==
A cover version of "Good Times" by INXS and Jimmy Barnes was a No. 2 in Australia in 1986, and became the biggest selling single on Mushroom Records. In 1987 it became a No. 47 hit in the US after being featured on the soundtrack of the film The Lost Boys.

In 1987, Gary Moore released a cover version of "Friday on My Mind" on the Wild Frontier album that charted in Australia, Ireland, Finland, New Zealand and the UK.

== Members ==
- Stevie Wright – vocals (1964–1969, 1986; died 2015)
- Harry Vanda – lead guitar, vocals (1964–1969, 1986)
- George Young – rhythm guitar, vocals (1964–1969, 1986; died 2017)
- Dick Diamonde – bass, vocals (1964–1969, 1986; died 2024)
- Snowy Fleet – drums, vocals (1964–1967, 1986; died 2025)
- Tony Cahill – drums (1967–1969; died 2014)

== Discography ==
=== Studio albums ===
- Easy (1965)
- It's 2 Easy (1966)
- Volume 3 (1966)
- Good Friday / Friday on My Mind (1967)
- Vigil / Falling Off the Edge of the World (1968)
- Friends (1970)

== Portrayals in media ==
Friday on My Mind is an Australian television drama mini series first screened on ABC in 2017, based on the history of the band from its formation at the Villawood Migrant Hostel in 1964 to the 1969 breakup.

== Awards and nominations ==
=== ARIA Music Awards ===
The ARIA Music Awards is an annual awards ceremony that recognises excellence, innovation, and achievement across all genres of Australian music. They commenced in 1987. The Easybeats were inducted into the Hall of Fame in 2005.

Year	Nominee / work	Award	Result
2005	The Easybeats	ARIA Hall of Fame	inductee

== Bibliography ==
- Hard Road - The Life and Times of Stevie Wright, by Glenn Goldsmith with Stevie Wright, Random House Australia, 2004, ISBN 978-1740512619
