= Harry Vanda =

Australian musician (born 1946)

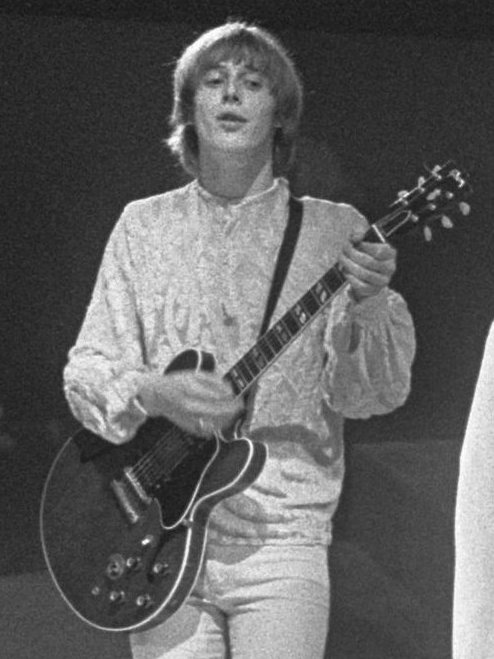
- Vanda performing in 1968

Background information
- Born: Johannes Hendrikus Jacob van den Berg; 22 March 1946 (age 80); Voorburg, Netherlands
- Origin: Sydney, New South Wales, Australia
- Genres: Rock, pop
- Occupations: Musician; songwriter; record producer
- Instruments: Guitar; vocals
- Years active: 1964–present
- Label: Albert Productions
- Formerly of: The Easybeats; Marcus Hook Roll Band; Flash and the Pan

Johannes Hendrikus Jacob van den Berg (born 22 March 1946), better known as Harry Vanda, is a Dutch-Australian singer, musician, songwriter and record producer. He is the last surviving member of the 1960s Australian rock band the Easybeats who with fellow member George Young formed the 1970s and 1980s songwriting and record production duo Vanda & Young.

van den Berg is the last surviving member of the Easybeats, as of February 2025, following the death of the band's drummer, Gordon "Snowy" Fleet.

In September 2025, Vanda released his debut solo single "Devil Loose".

== Early life ==
Johannes Hendrikus Jacob van den Berg was born in Voorburg, a town in the Province of South Holland in the Netherlands in 1946. His parents were Henricus Cornelius van den Berg (born 14 September 1923), a mechanic from the Netherlands and Lisa Berg-Warsozk (born 19 September 1924), who was Polish. Harry's parents got married on 9 June 1945. From 1942 to 1945, Henricus was under forced labour under German rule during World War II. Vanda is a second cousin of Swedish ABBA singer Agnetha Fältskog.

Vanda's family migrated to Australia from the Netherlands in 1963, and settled in Sydney. In the same year, he met rhythm guitarist George Young at the Villawood migrant hostel. In 2007, Australian Musician magazine selected this meeting as the most significant event in Australian pop and rock music history.

== Career ==
=== The Easybeats ===
Vanda, who had been a guitarist with the Hague-based band the Starfighters, came to fame in 1964–65 as the lead guitarist of the Easybeats.

Vanda's ability to speak English was still very limited when the band was at their peak. Easybeats bassist Dick Diamonde, who was also a Dutch Australian, would help him learn English. By 1966, Vanda was nearly fluent in English and he and George Young penned many of the Easybeats' later recordings, including their major international hit, "Friday On My Mind".

When I met Harry Vanda he could hardly speak a line of English and now he can speak it better than me - he teaches me words.

— Stevie Wright

After the Easybeats disbanded in 1970, Vanda & Young remained in the UK and continued their writing and performing partnership.

=== Vanda and Young ===
In 1973, Vanda and Young returned to Australia and took over as the house producers for leading independent record production company, Albert Productions, and publisher J. Albert & Son. From 1974, they enjoyed huge success in Australia and internationally, writing and producing hits for a number of popular Australian groups and solo singers, including John Paul Young, Cheetah, Stevie Wright, Ted Mulry, Rose Tattoo, the Angels, William Shakespeare, Mark Williams and, most notably, AC/DC. AC/DC included George Young's brothers, guitarists Angus and Malcolm Young. Vanda & Young produced landmark albums such as Let There Be Rock, Powerage, If You Want Blood You've Got It, Dirty Deeds Done Dirt Cheap, High Voltage/TNT, amongst others.

Vanda and Young had major international success with their own studio-only project Flash and the Pan, achieving many hits around the world over a 15-year period, particularly in Europe, where they had many chart-topping records. Grace Jones had a hit with a cover of the Flash and the Pan song "Walking in the Rain".

=== Later work ===
By the late 1990s, Vanda and Young had left their longtime partnership with Albert Productions, and retired from the music industry. However, in 2005, Harry Vanda started Flashpoint Music in Surry Hills with his producer/engineer son, Daniel Vandenberg, setting up one of Australia's premier private studios. The studio has produced bands such as the Wrights and British India.

== Instruments ==
Vanda used a 1964 Höfner Verithin 1574 with Bigsby tremolo and 511 pickups, before switching in 1965 to a Gibson 345. In the Easybeats, Vanda also often played a cherry-red Maton 12-string electric guitar, which he donated to the collection of Powerhouse Museum in Sydney in 1999. In addition, Vanda owned the red Gretsch Jet Firebird double cutaway guitar that was given to George Young's younger brother Malcolm. This guitar, nicknamed "The Beast", saw numerous modifications and was Malcolm Young's primary guitar throughout his career with AC/DC.

== Honours and Awards ==
=== ARIA Awards ===
Year	Nominee / work	Award	Result
1988	himself	ARIA Hall of Fame	inducted

=== Australian Songwriters Hall of Fame ===
The Australian Songwriters Hall of Fame was established in 2004 to honour the lifetime achievements of some of Australia's greatest songwriters.

Year	Nominee / work	Award	Result
2004	himself	Australian Songwriters Hall of Fame	inducted

=== MPEG Awards ===
The Music Producer and Engineers’ Guild (MPEG Awards) Awards celebrate excellence in music production and engineering in Australia. They commenced in 2024.

Year	Nominee / work	Award	Result (wins only)	Ref.
2025	Vanda & Young	Lifetime Achievement Award	awarded	

Since 2009, Albert Music and APRA AMCOS have held the Vanda & Young Global Songwriting Competition, named after the musicians.
