= John Paul Young discography =

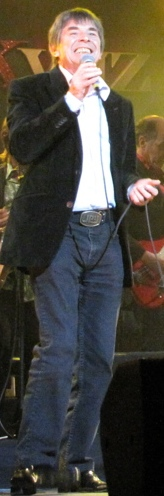
- John Paul Young in 2010
- Studio albums: 9
- EPs: 1
- Compilation albums: 9
- Singles: 37

The discography of John Paul Young consists of nine studio albums, nine compilation albums, one EP and 37 singles. As of October 1978, Young had four platinum albums and nine gold singles in Australia.

== Albums ==
=== Studio albums ===
Title	Album details	Chart peak positions	Certifications (sales thresholds)
Title	Album details	AUS	Certifications (sales thresholds)
Hero	Released: October 1975; Label: Albert Productions/EMI (APLP-013); Formats: LP, CD	9	AUS: Gold
J.P.Y.	Released: August 1976; Label: Albert Productions/EMI (APLP-019); Formats: LP, CD	9	AUS: Platinum
Green	Released: April 1977; Label: Albert Productions/EMI (APLP-023); Formats: LP, CD	19	AUS: Gold
Love Is in the Air	Released: October 1978; Label: Albert Productions/EMI (APLP-033) Ariola Records (Note: Released as Lost in Your Love by Ariola Records for European markets.) (25 846 OT); Formats: LP, CD; Note: Lost in Your Love (European title)	32	
Heaven Sent	Released: November 1979; Label: Albert Productions/EMI (APLP-041); Formats: LP, cassette, CD	95	
The Singer	Released: August 1981; Label: Hammard Records (Ham 601); Formats: LP	98	
One Foot in Front	Released: March 1984; Label: I.C. Records (KSL 901); Formats: LP, cassette	—	
Now	Released: September 1996; Label: Albert Productions/EMI; Formats: CD	—	
In Too Deep	Released: 4 November 2006; Label: ABC Music/Warner Bros. (); Formats: CD	—	
"—" denotes releases that did not chart or were not released in that territory.

=== Compilation albums ===
Title	Album details	Chart peak positions		
Title	Album details	AUS	NOR	SWE
All the Best	Released: November 1977; Label: Albert Productions/EMI (APLP-027); Format: LP	40	not released	not released
Love Is in the Air	Released: January 1978 (European only release); Label: Ariola (25846 OT); Format: LP, cassette	not released	13	16
John Paul Young 1974–1979	Released: 20 September 1979; Label: Hammard (HAM 038); Format: LP	—	—	—
Classic Hits	Released: 1988; Label: Albert Productions (465240-2); Format: CD	96	—	—
Yesterday's Hero	Released: 1992; Label: Repertoire (REP4277-WG); Format: CD	—	—	—
The Very Best of	Released: 1994; Label: Diamond (NLD) (019650.6); Format: CD	not released	not released	not released
The Most of John Paul Young	Released: 1997; Label: Albert Productions (AUS) (7243 8 59948 2 1); Format: CD	—	—	—
Greatest Hits	Released: 1997; Label: LaserLight (GER) (12 896); Format: CD	not released	not released	not released
I Hate the Music	Released: 18 September 2009; Label: J Albert & Son / Sony Music Australia (88697591422); Format: CD. DD	—	—	—
"—" denotes releases that did not chart.

== Extended plays ==
Title	EP details
The Golden Dance-Floor Hits Vol. 10	Released: 1978; Label: ZYX Records (ZYX 5630) (Note: Released in the Netherlands and Germany—not released in Australia.); Format: 12" Maxi single

== Singles ==
Year	Title	Peak chart positions										Album
Year	Title	AUS	SA	UK	US AC	US	AUT	GER	NLD	NOR	SWE	Album
1972	"Pasadena"	16	—	—	—	—	—	—	—	—	—	non-album single
1973	"You Drive Me Crazy"	—	—	—	—	—	—	—	—	—	—	non-album single
1974	"It's Only Love"	—	—	—	—	—	—	—	—	—	—	non-album single
1974	"Show and Tell"	—	—	—	—	—	—	—	—	—	—	non-album single
1975	"Yesterday's Hero"	8	1	—	—	42	—	—	—	—	10	Hero
1975	"The Love Game"	4	—	—	—	—	—	—	—	—	—	Hero
1976	"I Hate the Music"	2	1	—	—	—	—	—	—	—	18	J.P.Y.
1976	"Keep On Smilin'"	15	10	—	—	—	—	—	—	—	—	J.P.Y.
1977	"Standing in the Rain"	12	—	—	—	—	11	4	3	—	—	J.P.Y.
1977	"I Wanna Do It With You"	7	8	—	—	—	—	—	—	—	—	Green
1977	"Here We Go"	43	—	—	—	—	—	—	—	—	—	Green
1977	"Where the Action Is"	33	—	—	—	—	—	—	—	—	—	All The Best
1977	"Love Is in the Air"	3	2	5	1	7	3	3	9	2	2	Love Is in the Air
1978	"The Day That My Heart Caught Fire"	20	20	—	—	—	—	—	—	—	—	Love Is in the Air
1978	"Lost in Your Love"	—	—	—	—	55	25	—	37	—	—	Love Is in the Air
1978	"Fool in Love"	58	—	—	—	—	—	—	—	—	—	Love Is in the Air
1979	"Heaven Sent"	53	—	—	—	—	—	—	—	—	—	Heaven Sent
1979	"Love You So Bad It Hurts"	—	—	—	—	—	—	—	—	—	—	Heaven Sent
1979	"Can't Get You Out of My System"	—	—	—	—	—	—	—	—	—	—	Heaven Sent
1980	"Hot for You Baby"	—	—	—	—	—	—	—	—	—	—	Heaven Sent
"—" denotes a recording that did not chart or was not released in that territory.

Year	Title	Peak chart positions	Album
Year	Title	AUS	Album
1981	"653354"	—	non-album single
1981	"Out of Time"	—	The Singer
1982	"Oh No No"	—	non-album single
1983	"Soldier of Fortune"	17	One Foot in Front
1984	"War Games"	87	One Foot in Front
1984	"L.A. Sunset"	—	One Foot in Front
1984	"Call the Night"	—	One Foot in Front
1986	"Spain"	—	non-album single
1989	"Don't Sing that Song"	—	Classic Hits
1992	"Love Is in the Air" (Strictly Ballroom mix)	3	Strictly Ballroom
1992	"Standing in the Rain" (The Bogo Pogo Club Mix)	—	Strictly Ballroom
1996	"Happy the Man"	—	Now
1998	"I Hate the Music" (with Ratcat)	186	non-album single
2001	"Love Is in the Air" (Milk & Sugar vs. JPY)	—	non-album single
2006	"Isn't It Sunshine"	—	In Too Deep
2006	"I'm Living on Dreams"	—	In Too Deep
2022	"Felt Like Love"	—	non-album single
"—" denotes a recording that did not chart or was not released in that territory.

=== Other singles ===
List of singles as featured artist or promotional releases
Title	Year
"Rock Around the Clock"(with Glenn Shorrock, Frankie J. Holden, Renée Geyer, Daryl Braithwaite and Graeme Strachan) (released to commemorate the 21st Anniversary of the release of "Rock Around the Clock")	1977
"Corazón en Llamas"/"Bajo la Lluvia" (Spanish versions of "The Day That My Heart Caught Fire"/"Standing in the Rain")	1979
"Thunderbolt" (Promo release to promote the "Thunderbolt" roller coaster ride at Dreamworld Amusement Park)	1982
"Stairways to Heaven" (Promo release to promote the Australian TV series "Stairways to Heaven"	1992
"El Amor Está en el Aire" (Spanish versions of "Love Is in the Air")	1993
"Miracle in a Manger" (Promotional release from "Dorothy the Dinosaur meets Santa Claus")	2010
"Familyman"(King Curly featuring John Paul Young)	2011
