= I Hate the Music (album) =

Compilation album by John Paul Young
- Released: 18 September 2009
- Genre: Pop, electronic
- Length: 65:11
- Label: Albert Productions, Sony Music Australia

John Paul Young chronology
In Too Deep (2006)	I Hate the Music (2009)

I Hate the Music
- I Hate the Music (streaming cover)

I Hate the Music is a compilation album by Australian pop singer John Paul Young. The album was released in September 2009 to coincide with Young's induction into the ARIA Hall of Fame in August 2009. It was re-released in April 2012 to celebrate Young's 40th Anniversary in music industry and his Order of Australia (OAM) for his services to charity and the music industry.

The album includes tracks from 8 of his 9 studio albums to date.

== Track listing ==
No.	Title	Writer(s)	Album	Length
1.	"St Louis"	Harry Vanda; George Young	Hero	3:44
2.	"Pasadena" (1972 single version)	David Hemmings; H Vanda; G Young		3:19
3.	"If I Could Live My Life Again"	H Vanda; G Young	J.P.Y.	3:32
4.	"I Hate the Music"	H Vanda; G Young	J.P.Y.	3:50
5.	"I Wanna Do It With You"	H Vanda; G Young	Green	3:09
6.	"Keep On Smilin'"	H Vanda; G Young	J.P.Y.	2:55
7.	"The Next Time"	H Vanda; G Young	Hero	3:32
8.	"The Love Game"	H Vanda; G Young	Hero	3:48
9.	"Where the Action Is"	H Vanda; G Young	All the Best	3:05
10.	"Yesterday’s Hero"	H Vanda; G Young	Hero	3:43
11.	"Standing in the Rain"	H Vanda; G Young	J.P.Y.	4:08
12.	"Love Is in the Air"	H Vanda; G Young	Love Is in the Air	3:28
13.	"Heaven Sent"	H Vanda; G Young	Heaven Sent	3:15
14.	"Soldier of Fortune"	John Capek; Marc Jordan	One Foot in Front	4:32
15.	"65 33 54"	H Vanda; G Young	Classic Hits	3:45
16.	"Don’t Sing That Song"	H Vanda; G Young	Classic Hits	3:38
17.	"Happy the Man"	H Vanda; G Young	Now	4:00
18.	"Isn’t It Sunshine"	H Vanda; G Young	In Too Deep	3:35

== Release history ==
Region	Date	Format	Edition(s)	Label	Catalogue
Australia	18 September 2009	CD; digital download	Standard	Albert Productions, Sony BMG	7591422
Australia	20 April 2012	CD; digital download	Standard	Sony Music Australia	88697591422
United States of America	1 April 2017	streaming	Standard	Albert Productions	
