= Classic Hits (John Paul Young album) =

Compilation album by John Paul Young
- Released: 1988
- Genre: Pop
- Length: 1:04:25
- Label: Albert Productions
- Producer: Simon Napier-Bell (tracks: 2), Harry Vanda, George Young

John Paul Young chronology
One Foot in Front (1983)	Classic Hits (1988)	Yesterday's Hero (1992)

Classic Hits

Singles from Classic Hits
- 1. "Don't Sing That Song" Released: May 1989

Classic Hits is the fourth compilation album by Australian pop singer John Paul Young, released in 1988. "Don't Sing That Song" was released as the only single in May 1989.

The album has been re-released numerous times since 1988. The tracks on the 2006 re-release were all digitally remastered at Albert Studios, Sydney, Australia.

== Track listing ==
No.	Title	Writer(s)	Length
1.	"Yesterday's Hero"	Harry Vanda, George Young	3:48
2.	"Pasadena"	David Hemmings, H. Vanda, G. Young	3:18
3.	"The Love Game"	H. Vanda, G. Young	3:30
4.	"St. Louis"	H. Vanda, G. Young	3:47
5.	"I Hate the Music"	H. Vanda, G. Young	3:52
6.	"I Wanna Do It with You"	H. Vanda, G. Young	3:00
7.	"Here We Go"	Warren Morgan	3:40
8.	"Keep On Smilin'"	H. Vanda, G. Young	2:56
9.	"Birmingham"	H. Vanda, G. Young	4:14
10.	"Standing in the Rain"	H. Vanda, G. Young	4:10
11.	"Where the Action Is"	H. Vanda, G. Young	3:05
12.	"Love Is in the Air"	H. Vanda, G. Young	3:28
13.	"The Day That My Heart Caught Fire"	H. Vanda, G. Young	3:04
14.	"Lost In Your Love"	H. Vanda, G. Young	3:10
15.	"Heaven Sent"	H. Vanda, G. Young	3:14
16.	"Hot For You Baby"	H. Vanda, G. Young	4:09
17.	"6 5 33 5 4"	H. Vanda, G. Young	4:12
18.	"Don't Sing That Song"	H. Vanda, G. Young	3:38
Total length:			1:04:25

== Charts ==
Chart (1992)	Peak position
Australian Albums (ARIA)	95

== Release history ==
Region	Date	Format	Label	Catalogue
Australia	1988	Vinyl / Cassette	Albert Productions	465240 4
Australia / New Zealand	1989	CD	Albert Productions	335602
Australia	18 February 2003	CD	Festival Records	B00006GO58
Australia	29 April 2006	CD; digital download	Albert Productions	82876868892
