= All the Best (John Paul Young album) =

All The Best

Greatest hits album by John Paul Young
- Released: November 1977
- Recorded: 1975–1977
- Studio: Albert Productions
- Genre: Pop
- Length: 43:07
- Label: Albert Productions

John Paul Young chronology
Green (1977)	All The Best (1977)	Love Is in the Air (1978)

Singles from All The Best
- 1. "Where the Action Is" Released: October 1977

All the Best is the first compilation album by Australian pop singer John Paul Young. Released in November 1977, the album charted at number 40 on the Kent Music Report. The album includes songs from his three studio albums Hero, J.P.Y. and Green.

== Track listing ==
Side A

1. "Yesterday's Hero" (Harry Vanda, George Young) – 3:39
2. "The Painting" (H. Vanda, G. Young) – 4:25
3. "The Love Game" (H. Vanda, G. Young) – 3:25
4. "Birmingham" (H. Vanda, G. Young) – 4:03
5. "I Wanna Do It with You" (H. Vanda, G. Young)- 2:57
6. "Standing in the Rain" (H. Vanda, G. Young) – 4:05

Side B

1. "I Hate the Music" (H. Vanda, G. Young) – 3:48
2. "Pasadena" (David Hemmings, H. Vanda, G. Young) – 3:16
3. "Where the Action Is" (H. Vanda, G. Young) – 3:05
4. "Here We Go" (Warren Morgan) – 3:38
5. "Keep On Smilin'" (H. Vanda, G. Young) – 2:56
6. "Gay Time Rock 'N' Roll City" (W. Morgan, John Paul Young) – 3:44

== Charts ==
Chart (1977/78)	Peak position
Australian Kent Music Report	40

== Personnel ==
- Vocals – John Paul Young
- Guitar – Harry Vanda, Ian Winter, Phil Manning, Ronnie Peel
- Bass – George Young, Ronnie Peel, Dallas McDermott
- Keyboards – George Young, Pig Morgan
- Drums – George Young, John Proud, Johnny Dick, Spike Nimble
- Saxophone – Tony Buchanan
- Backing vocals – Vanda & Young
