= Love Is in the Air (compilation album) =

Compilation album by John Paul Young
- Released: January 1978
- Recorded: 1975–1977
- Genre: Pop, Disco music, Poprock
- Label: Ariola

John Paul Young chronology
All the Best (1977)	Love Is in the Air (1978)	Love Is in the Air (1978)

Love Is in the Air is a European only compilation album by Australian pop singer John Paul Young. The album was released in January 1978 to capitalise on the success of the song "Love Is in the Air", which was released in December 1977 and charted within the top 10 in Netherlands by January 1978. The album include songs from Young's three studio albums Hero, J.P.Y. and Green.

== Track listing ==
Side A

1. "Love Is in the Air" (Harry Vanda, George Young) – 3:27
2. "Take the Money" – 3:40
3. "I Wanna Do It with You" (H. Vanda, G. Young) – 2:57
4. "Gay Time Rock 'N' Roll City" (Warren Morgan, John Paul Young) – 3:44
5. "Here We Go" (Morgan) – 3:38

Side B

1. "The Same Old Thing" (Morgan, J.P. Young) – 3:20
2. "Just Can't Do It" (Morgan, J.P. Young) – 2:55
3. "Bad Trip" (H. Vanda, G. Young) – 3:10
4. "Where the Action Is" (H. Vanda, G. Young) – 3:05
5. "The Painting" (H. Vanda, G. Young) – 4:25

== Charts ==
Chart (1978)	Peak position
Norwegian Albums (VG-lista)	13
Swedish Albums (Sverigetopplistan)	16
