= Lost in Your Love =

Lost in Your Love may refer to:

- "Lost in Your Love" (Redlight song), 2012
- "Lost in Your Love" (John Paul Young song), 1978
- "Lost in Your Love" (Tony Hadley song), 1992
- "Lost in Your Love", song by Bee Gees from Mr. Natural
- "Lost in Your Love", song by R. Kelly from Love Letter
- "Lost in Your Love", song by Lila McCann from Complete
- "Lost in Your Love", song by The Isley Brothers from Tracks of Life
- "Lost in Your Love", song by Carly Simon from Letters Never Sent
- "Lost in Your Love", song by Gary Moore from A Different Beat
- "Lost In Your Love", song by Tyler Woods from The Mahogany Experiment released by It's a Wonderful World Music Group
- "Lost in Your Love", song by 1940s jazz singer Arcesia
- Lost in Your Love (album), the European title for John Paul Young's album Love Is in the Air
