= Ted Albert =

Australian record producer

- Born: 1937
- Died: 11 November 1990 (aged 52–53)
- Occupation: Record producer

Edward Frank Albert (1937 – 11 November 1990) was an Australian early pioneer independent record producer, and founder of Albert Productions (part of his great-grandfather's company Albert Music). In recognition of his contribution to the music industry, the Australasian Performing Right Association established the annual Ted Albert Award for Outstanding Services to Australian Music.

== Early life ==
Edward Frank Albert was born in 1937 in Sydney, the second of three sons to parents Alexis Albert and his wife Elsie (née Lundgren). The family's music publishing empire, J. Albert & Son was founded by Edward's great-grandfather, Jacques Albert. Jacques Albert migrated to Australia from Switzerland in 1884 and established a clock, watch, and occasional violin repair business in King Street, Sydney. Later, with his son Frank, Jacques expanded the business and diversified into music publishing and sheet music retail. Frank also concluded music licensing arrangements with overseas publishers for Australia and New Zealand.

Ted Albert and his brothers Tony and Robert were raised in the family home "Coolong" in the eastern Sydney suburb of Vaucluse.

== Albert Productions ==
Ted Albert joined the family music business, in the company which was then known as J. Albert & Son, in the mid to late 1950s, a time when rock and roll was emerging into the music mainstream in the United States, Australia, and Europe. The early 1960s heralded the arrival of independent record producers Phil Spector and Joe Meek and later Shel Talmy. As artists in their own right, they had complete control of the creative process and shaped the bands' recording sound.

In a letter dated June 1964 addressed to Alberts' New York-based lawyer, Alex Albert wrote in part:

the time is at hand for a real boom in local (Australian contemporary) compositions and recordings and we have therefore entered this field with much more drive than ever before. We have formed an artists and repertoire (A&R) department and have inaugurated a recording subsidiary we have called 'Albert Productions'.

Albert Productions was established as J. Albert & Son's A&R department in late 1964 with the sole intention of signing and recording Australian artists. Ted Albert was Albert Productions' first managing director. The company lacked any dedicated record facilities, but J. Albert & Son owned and operated Sydney commercial radio station 2UW, and made its studios and a theatre available to Albert Productions for recording and audition purposes. Later still, Alberts contracted EMI and its subsidiary Parlophone Records to handle record distribution. In late 1964 Billy Thorpe and the Aztecs was the first act to sign to the Alberts label.

== The Easybeats ==
Ted Albert was introduced to members of The Easybeats by mutual friend and band manager Mike Vaughn. Vaughn organised a private audition, and a few days later the band was signed to a recording contract. Albert produced the early Easybeats records and played on some of these early recordings. He had an intuitive gift for selecting material, finding the right sound, and honing the "feel" of a song. Alberts then signed the band to a recording contract with EMI's Parlophone label. In 1966, The Easybeats signed a five-year record distribution contract with United Artists Records to handle the band's international product distribution.

After arriving in London in that year, Albert hired EMI's Abbey Road Studios to record the band's next album, although he was replaced by freelance producer Shel Talmy to record their biggest hit "Friday on My Mind". The single reached No. 1 in Australia, No. 6 in the UK, and No. 16 in the United States.

== Record entrepreneur ==
In the 1970s, Albert fostered Australia's third wave of youth-oriented music. Early in 1972, Simon Napier-Bell, the English record producer, was scouting for new talent in Australia and produced a few records for Alberts, including 'Pasadena'. The song, which was recorded by singer John Paul Young, was written by former Easybeats Vanda and Young with lyrics by British film, stage, and television actor David Hemmings. The single reached No. 16 on the Australian singles charts in early 1972.

At the time Vanda and Young were still living in England but upon hearing of Pasadena's chart success returned to Sydney. In 1973, Alberts opened a recording studio in Boomerang House, a building owned by the Albert family at 139 King Street in Sydney's central business district. Albert produced the Ted Mulry Gang's album Here We Are, and that album's single "Jump in My Car", in King Street.

During the 1970s and the early 1980s Albert Studios became one of Sydney's pre-eminent recording studios for recording contemporary music for artists, including pop artist William Shakespeare through to The Angels, Rose Tattoo, Heroes, Cheetah, Choirboys and internationally renowned band AC/DC. In addition the studios were much in demand by rock bands such as Cold Chisel and Midnight Oil or by blues music acts such as Graham Lowndes and for the recording of commercial radio jingles.

Albert invested considerable sums of time and money in equipping Alberts with state-of-the-art recording technology, and the facility was gradually expanded to accommodate four studios. By one account he would buy the latest console or multi-rack (technology) on the spot whilst on overseas business trips. For example, in 1978, Albert Productions installed a MCI JH-500 series mixing console, reputedly Australia's first automated console, acquired on one such trip.

== Recognition ==
In 1990, in recognition of his contribution to the local music industry, Albert was awarded a Lifetime Achievement Award at the annual ARIA Awards.

== Film industry ==
In 1988, Albert and producer Tristram Miall established a film production company called M & A Productions (Miall and Albert) to pursue film ideas and opportunities in the music and dance genres. Ted Albert had attended Sydney's Wharf Theatre to watch the stage play, Strictly Ballroom, written and directed by Baz Luhrmann. Tristram Miall bought the film rights and commissioned Luhrmann to write and direct the film adaption. Albert spent three years raising film finance.

On its release, the film of Strictly Ballroom garnered critical acclaim and was No.1 at the Australian box office in 1992. The film launched Baz Luhrmann's career in the Australian film industry. The soundtrack featured the Vanda and Young-penned tune "Love Is in the Air" performed by John Paul Young. With the film's international success, and the subsequent release of the new version of the song, the single peaked at number 2 on the Australian charts, and was a minor hit in the UK. The film subsequently received eight Australian Film Institute Awards, as well as the coveted Prix de la Jeunesse at the Cannes film festival.

== Personal life ==
Albert married Antoinette (Popsy) Albert (née Muir), and they had two daughters.

Albert was a dedicated sailor and helmsman. His family had a long-standing association with the Royal Sydney Yacht Squadron. Albert raced the dragon class yachts Rawhiti AUS 111 & Rawhiti 11, AUS176, and he was a dual Prince Philip Cup, New South Wales Champion, and twice successful defender of the Sayonara Cup sailed in the Dragon Class.

== Death and legacy ==
Ted Albert died from a heart attack on 11 November 1990 aged 53, survived by his wife Antoinette (Popsy) Albert née Muir and two daughters.

In 1992 the Australasian Performing Right Association (APRA) established the annual Ted Albert Award for Outstanding Service to Australian Music.
