= Love Is in the Air =

Love Is in the Air may refer to:

== Film and television ==
=== Films ===
- Love Is in the Air (2005 film), a French film starring Marion Cotillard
- Love Is in the Air (2011 film), a Danish film
- Love Is in the Air (2012 film), an Italian film starring Claudia Gerini
- Love Is in the Air (2013 film), a French film starring Ludivine Sagnier
- Love Is in the Air (2023 film), an Australian film starring Delta Goodrem

=== Television ===
- Love Is in the Air (Turkish TV series), or Sen Çal Kapımı, a 2020–2021 soap opera
- Love Is in the Air, a 2003 Australian documentary series; see List of programs broadcast by ABC (Australian TV network)
- "Love Is in the Air" (Desperate Housewives), a 2005 episode
- "Love Is in the Air" (Fuller House), a 2016 episode

== Music ==
- "Love Is in the Air" (song), a 1977 song by John Paul Young
- Love Is in the Air (compilation album), a January 1978 album by John Paul Young
- Love Is in the Air (studio album), an October 1978 album by John Paul Young
- Love Is in the Air, a 2019 album by the Ten Tenors
- "Love Is in the Air", a 2013 song by Toya Delazy from Due Drop
- "Love Is in the Air", a song from the 1976 musical revue Side by Side by Sondheim

== Art ==
- Flower Thrower, also called Love is in the Air, mural painting by Banksy

== See also ==
- Love Is in the Hair, a 2016 Nigerian film
- Love Is in the Heir, a 2004–2005 American TV series
- "Love Is in the N_{2}-O_{2}-Ar-CO_{2}-Ne-He-CH_{4}", a 2016 The Simpsons episode
