= I Hate Music =

I Hate Music may refer to:

- I Hate Music (album), by Superchunk, 2013
- I Hate Music (song cycle), by Leonard Bernstein, 1943
- "I Hate Music", a song by the Replacements from Sorry Ma, Forgot to Take Out the Trash, 1981

== See also ==
- "I Hate the Music", a song by John Paul Young, 1976
- I Hate the Music (album), by John Paul Young, 2009
- Ich hasse Musik, an album by Knorkator
