= Jimmy and the Boys =

Australian musical group

- Origin: Sydney, New South Wales, Australia
- Genres: Shock rock, new wave
- Years active: 1976–1982
- Labels: Astor, Avenue, Festival, EMI
- Past members: Tom Falkinham; Joylene Thornbird Hairmouth; Scott Johnston; Ignatius Jones; Jason Morphett; Andrew de Teliga; Barry Litten; Pat Sheil; Hamish Stuart; Greg Taylor; Andrew Ross; Mike Sheil; Michael Parks

Jimmy and the Boys were an Australian shock rock and new wave band, active from 1976 to 1982.

They pioneered the use of shock theatrics in Australia with an act that revolved around vocalist and contortionist Ignatius Jones and keyboard player Joylene Thornbird Hairmouth. The group recorded two studio albums, Not Like Everybody Else (November 1979) and Teddy Boys Picnic (July 1981). In May 1981 they scored their only Australian top 10 single with "They Won't Let My Girlfriend Talk to Me". In 1982, shortly after issuing their live album In Hell with Your Mother, they disbanded.

Australian rock music journalist, Jenny Hunter-Brown, described Jimmy and the Boys as a "high voltage package of filth, glorious filth". According to rock music historian, Ian McFarlane, their performances "mixed S&M trappings, sex shop props, mock rape and other depravities with sub-Zappaesque humour, hard rock, jazz, reggae and disco" and at the end of the 1970s they were "one of the most popular live acts on the Australian scene".

== History ==
Ignatius Jones (born Juan Ignacio Trapaga) and Joylene Thornbird Hairmouth (born William O'Riordan) were friends from Cranbrook School and Saint Ignatius' College, private boys schools in Sydney. The pair founded Jimmy and the Boys in 1976 as a shock rock group with Jones on lead vocals, Hairmouth on keyboards and vocals, Tom Falkinham on bass guitar, Scott Johnston on drums, Jason Morphett on saxophone and Andrew de Teliga on guitar. On stage Jones was also a contortionist and Hairmouth was "the kitchiest [sic] of transvestites". Other than mainstays, Jones and Hairmouth, the line-up was regularly changed. In 1978 Hairmouth and Jones were joined by Danny Damjanovic on saxophone and flute, Steven Hall on guitar and vocals, Barry Litten (ex-Rabbit) on drums and Michael Parks on bass guitar and vocals. In October 1979 the group issued their debut single, "I'm Not Like Everybody Else" which is a cover version of The Kinks 1966 B-side of "Sunny Afternoon". Damjanovic was later a member of rock, jazz group Outline.

In November 1979 the group released their first studio album, Not Like Everybody Else, which was delayed after Astor Records decided it was "too obscene". It appeared on Avenue Records – a newly formed imprint by Festival Records "to handle Jimmy and the Boys". By April 1980, the new line-up included Joe P. Rick (real name Joseph Attaulah) on guitar and vocals, Michael Vidale on bass guitar and vocals, and a returning Johnston on drums and vocals. In May that year the band were featured on the cover of RAM (Rock Australia Magazine) which described the group, "[t]heir performances featured politics, simulated sex and violent humour. Their stage antics involved the use of props, such as setting fire to dolls and maiming an effigy of [then-Prime Minister] Malcolm Fraser". In 1981 they scored their only top 10 single with "They Won't Let My Girlfriend Talk to Me", written by Split Enz leader, Tim Finn. According to the Split Enz radio documentary, Enzology (2005), Finn was initially unhappy with Jimmy and the Boys' version. The original demo by Finn appears on the album Other Enz (1999).

Their second studio album was July 1981's Teddy Boys Picnic. Jimmy and the Boys briefly disbanded in January 1982 and Jones moved to the theatre stage, playing the dual roles of Eddie and Dr. Scott in the Australian revival of The Rocky Horror Show. In mid-1982 the band reformed for a national tour, which resulted in a live album, In Hell with Your Mother (1982) but they disbanded soon after. Following the second and final break up of the band, Warner Bros. Records signed Jones to a six-album record deal, of which little actually materialised, although Jones released a 1982 single "Like a Ghost". In the mid-1980s Jones and O'Riordan formed a swing jazz-cabaret band, Pardon Me Boys, with Jones' sister and former Play School presenter Monica Trapaga on lead vocals. Following his solo career Jones co-wrote, with Pat Sheil, a book True Hip (1990), and in 2000 helped organise the opening ceremony for the 2000 Sydney Olympics.

== Discography ==
=== Studio albums ===
List of studio albums, with Australian chart positions
Title	Album details	Peak chart positions
Title	Album details	AUS
Not Like Everybody Else!	Released: November 1979; Format: LP, Cassette; Label: Avenue Records (L37141)	44
Teddy Boys Picnic	Released: October 1981; Format: LP, Cassette; Label: Avenue Records (RML 53005)	40

=== Live albums ===
List of live albums
Title	Album details	Peak chart positions
Title	Album details	AUS
In Hell With Your Mother!	Released: 1982; Format: LP, Cassette; Label: Avenue Records (SBP 237865)	–

=== Compilation albums ===
List of compilations
Title	Album details
Out of Phaze	Released: 1988; Format: CD, Cassette; Label: Avenue Records (MID 166181)
Wild Boys	Released: 1997; Format: 2xCD; Label: Avenue Records (724382329527)
The Great Oz Rock	Released: 2002; Format: 3xCD (also featuring Mondo Rock and Kevin Borich); Label: Rajon Records (R0108)
The Best of Jimmy & The Boys	Released: 2018; Format: CD, Digital download, streaming; Label: Avenue Records (19075829842)

=== EPs ===
List of EPs
Title	Album details
Products of Your Mind	Released: 1979; Format: 12", mini-LP; Label: Stunn (BFA 016)

=== Singles ===
List of singles, with selected chart positions
Year	Title	Peak chart positions	Album
Year	Title	AUS	Album
1979	"I'm Not Like Everybody Else"	57	Not Like Everybody Else!
1980	"Products of Your Mind"	66	
1981	"They Won't Let My Girlfriend Talk to Me"	8	Teddy Boys Picnic
1981	"Mirror Mirror"	91	
1981	"Get Off My Cloud"	–	

== Members ==
Arranged chronologically and alphabetically:

- Tom Falkinham – bass guitar (1976)
- Joylene Thornbird Hairmouth (born William O'Riordan) – keyboards, vocals (1976–1982)
- Scott Johnston – drums (1976, 1982)
- Ignatius Jones (born Juan Ignacio Trapaga) – lead vocals (1976–1982)
- Jason Morphett – saxophone (1976)
- Andrew de Teliga – guitar (1976)
- Danny Damjanovic – saxophone, flute (1978)
- Stephen Hall – guitar, vocals (1978)
- Barry Lytten – drums (1978)
- Michael Parks – bass guitar, vocals (1978)
- Rick Sutton – guitar (1979–80)
- Joe P. Rick (aka Joseph Attala) – guitar, vocals (1980–82)
- Michael Vidale – bass guitar (1979–82)
