= Bird Automatic =

Australian musical group

- Origin: Sydney, New South Wales, Australia
- Genre: Indie pop
- Years active: 2006–present
- Label: Independent
- Members: Chris Bradstreet; Christopher Toole; John-Henry Pajak; Simon Hamblin; Tim Whitnall
- Past members: Zeyd Naito; Alex 'The Gimp' Sholler
- Website: Myspace

Bird Automatic are an Australian alternative indie-pop five-piece band based in Sydney. Bird Automatic consists of Chris Bradstreet (guitar/vocals), John-Henry Pajak (drums), Chris Toole (guitar/backing vocals), Alex Sholler (bass guitar), and Simon Hamblin (synthesizer).

== Biography ==
The band formed in late 2006, based around Bradstreet, who after producing some of his own demos was urged to form a band and offered management by a friend.

"I knew Simon (Hamblin) first, he actually wanted to be the band's manager – he was the one that said I should get a band together" – Bradstreet

Bradstreet then approached Chris Toole, a high school friend of his, whilst Simon encouraged John-Henry Pajak to join.

"After that, we were looking for a keyboard player, so we told Simon to get a keyboard and he started playing with us" – Bradstreet The band played its first show in November of that year at Candy's Apartment, Kings Cross.

2008 has seen the band develop its catalogue with the emergence of their first self-titled independent EP release.

Track Listing:

1. "Suburbs"
2. "Can't Sleep"
3. "Everything In An Instant"
4. "Comforably Optimistic"
5. "Hemispheres"

They are featured as an 'Emerging Artist' on the Triple J website and are The Unearthed Feature Artists of 2 August 2008.

In 2009 Bird Automatic released a second EP 'Not Morning People' on local label Taper Jean Records through Shock. Their singles 'About The Money' and 'What Should Be Told' received air-play from radio Triple J and community radio around Australia and was highly reviewed online in Australia and overseas.

The band continued their busy live schedule as they played shows along the east coast of Australia with bands such as The Temper Trap, Dappled Cities, and The John Steel Singers.

Track Listing:

1. "What Should Be Told
2. "About The Money
3. "Drew A Line"
4. "Hesitate"
5. "Fireflies"
6. "Borders Not Boundaries"

In the beginning of 2010 the band recorded the double A-side, "Neon Dagger" / "Keep Out The Sunlight", whilst they began writing their debut album. This saw a break in their live shows, however, gave them time to shape their sound and develop their new material.

The band plan to have the album written by July, where they will then begin playing live featuring songs from their album and in support of their double A-side.

== Members ==
Chris Bradstreet	Guitar, vocals
Chris O'Toole	Guitar, backing vocals
Tim Whitnall	Bass Guitar
Simon Hamblin	Gimp Machine
John-Henry Pajak	Drums

== Touring ==
Played at the first Playground Weekender Festival with bands such as Chk Chk Chk (!!!), Elbow and The Dears.
Toured with fellow Australian indie band The Seabellies in late 2007.
Toured with Shout Out Louds on their second tour of Australia in August 2007.
Supported UK indie band 1990s in September 2007.
Supported UK indie outfit Art Brut in December 2007.
