= Fool in Love =

Single by John Paul Young

from the album Love Is in the Air
- Released: November 1978
- Recorded: 1978
- Genre: Pop
- Length: 3:00
- Label: Albert Productions
- Songwriter(s): Harry Vanda and George Young
- Producer(s): Harry Vanda, George Young

John Paul Young singles chronology
"Lost in Your Love" (1978)	"Fool in Love" (1978)	"Heaven Sent" (1979)

"Fool in Love" is a pop song written by Harry Vanda and George Young. It was recorded by Australian pop singer John Paul Young. The song was released in November 1978 as the fourth and final single from Young's fourth studio album Love Is in the Air (1978). The song peaked at number 58 on the Australian Kent Music Report in January 1979.

== Track listing ==
7" (AP 11831)

- Side A "Fool in Love" (H. Vanda and G. Young) - 3:00
- Side B "It's All Over" (J. P. Young, Warren Morgan) - 2:42

== Charts ==
Chart (1978/79)	Peak position
Australian (Kent Music Report)	58
