= Strictly Ballroom (soundtrack) =

Soundtrack album by David Hirschfelder
- Released: 1992

Professional ratings
Review scores
Source	Rating
Allmusic	3/5 stars

Strictly Ballroom is the original soundtrack of the 1992 Golden Globe-nominated film Strictly Ballroom starring Paul Mercurio, Tara Morice, Barry Otto and Pat Thomson. The original score was composed by David Hirschfelder.

The album won the BAFTA Award for Best Original Film Score.

At the ARIA Music Awards of 1993, the album was nominated for Best Original Soundtrack, Cast or Show Album.

== Track listing ==
1. "Love Is In The Air" (Ballroom Mix) performed by John Paul Young
2. "Perhaps Perhaps Perhaps" (Quizas Quizas Quizas) performed by Doris Day
3. "La Cumparsita/Tango Please" (Medley) performed by David Hirschfelder & The Bogo Pogo Orchestra
4. "Tequila/Sinful Samba" (Medley) performed by David Hirschfelder & The Bogo Pogo Orchestra
5. "Rhumba de Burros" performed by Ignatius Jones
6. "Doug's Tearful Waltz/First Kiss" performed by David Hirschfelder & The Bogo Pogo Orchestra
7. "Time After Time" performed by Mark Williams & Tara Morice
8. "Standing in the Rain" performed by John Paul Young/David Hirschfelder & The Bogo Pogo Orchestra
9. "Yesterday's Hero" performed by Ignatius Jones
10. "The Blue Danube" performed by David Hirschfelder & The Bogo Pogo Orchestra
11. "Scott & Fran's Paso Doble" performed by David Hirschfelder & The Bogo Pogo Orchestra

== Chart performance ==
=== Weekly chart ===
Chart (1992–93)	Peak position
Australian Albums (ARIA)	6
New Zealand Albums (RMNZ)	4

=== Year-end charts ===
Chart (1992)	Position
ARIA Albums Chart	50
Chart (1993)	Position
New Zealand Albums (RMNZ)	45

=== Certifications ===
Region	Certification	Certified units/sales
Australia (ARIA)	Platinum	70,000^{^}
^{^} Shipments figures based on certification alone.
