= Monica Trapaga =

Australian entertainment presenter, jazz singer, and writer

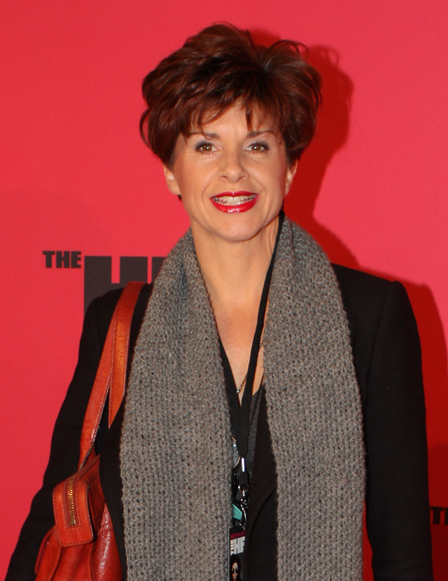
- Trapaga in July 2013

Background information
- Born: Monica Maria Trapaga; 1965 (age 60–61); Wahroonga, New South Wales, Australia
- Occupations: Television presenter, singer, writer
- Musical career
- Genres: Jazz, children's
- Instrument: Vocals
- Years active: 1985–present
- Labels: ABC Music; BMG; Festival Mushroom Records; rooArt; PolyGram
- Formerly of: Pardon Me Boys, Monica and the Moochers, Monica Trapaga and the Bachelor Pad
- Website: www.monicatrapaga.com

Monica Maria Trapaga (born 1965) is an Australian television presenter, jazz singer, and writer.

Trapaga started her career in children's entertainment as a presenter on Play School, from 1990 to 1998; and had provided the vocals to the theme of Bananas in Pyjamas from 1992.

Trapaga joined lifestyle program Better Homes and Gardens in 1997 presenting decoration-related segments until 2003.

Whilst Trapaga had been on Play School, she started recording children's music albums as well as jazz ones. She was a member of various groups: Pardon Me Boys, Monica and the Moochers, and Monica Trapaga and the Bachelor Pad. Since the early 2000s, she has owned stores in Summer Hill and Newtown.

== Early life ==
Trapaga was born in 1965 and grew up in Wahroonga, New South Wales, as the youngest child of Spanish American mother Margot Trapaga (born 1935, née Esteban) and Spanish Chinese father, Nestor Juan Trápaga.

Her older siblings were all born in Manila, Philippines: Juan Ignacio, the eldest later became known professionally as Ignatius Jones, and became an events director, journalist, actor and shock rocker. Luis Miguel and Rocio Maria Trápaga – the family had relocated to Sydney by March 1963. In November 1991 she described her "fairly crazy Latin family. I grew up surrounded by music – everything from jazz and Latin to opera and classical music. My father had an interest in jazz, particularly Afro-Cuban jazz."

== Music career ==
In 1985, Trapaga, on lead vocals, was a member of a swing jazz-cabaret band, Pardon Me Boys, with William O'Riordan (aka Joylene Hairmouth) and her older brother, Jones: both had been members of shock rockers Jimmy and the Boys. In February 1988 they issued a self-titled album, which Lisa Wallace of The Canberra Times felt that "the harmonies on this disc would rival any Andrews Sisters' recording... Hot, tasty and jazzy". Trápaga left Pardon Me Boys as "I wanted to present myself as more of a musician than a cabaret performer" and they were a group she "outgrew because it wasn't my band".

In July 1988 she founded Monica and the Moochers in Sydney; a reviewer from The Canberra Times described the group, as "a band that emulates the music of the late 1940s and 1950s" ahead of a gig in Canberra, which was to be followed by a tour itinerary including Perth. By November 1989 the line-up were Trápaga on lead vocals, Andrew Dickenson on drums, Julian Gough on tenor saxophone, Bernie McGann on alto saxophone, Adrian Mears on trombone, Alister Spence on piano and Jonathon Zwartz on bass guitar.

Monica and the Moochers' first studio album, Too Darn Hot, was released by August 1990 on rooArt Jazz/PolyGram. Michael Foster of The Canberra Times declared her voice "always amazes me... through the years, with the volume and range of sound generated from such a small, fine frame" while she "has a very strong and very accomplished and versatile backing group". For the album, the Moochers were Dickenson, Gough, McGann, Mears, Spence, now including Mike Bukovsky on trumpet and Dave Ellis on bass guitar.

In November 1991 their second studio album, Cotton on the Breeze, included tracks co-written by Trapaga, with her then-husband, Gough. The Canberra Times' Brad Turner caught a performance which provided "some powerful and tightly-played jazz, swing and Latin standards, and of course a selection from Cotton on the Breeze, most of which Monica wrote". At the ARIA Music Awards of 1992 the group were nominated for Best Adult Contemporary Album. The group performed at Sydney's inaugural International Jazz Festival in January 1992.

In 2016, Monica was named as the head juror on the Australian jury for the 2016 Eurovision Song Contest.

=== Personal life ===
Trápaga had a relationship with Ian and they became parents when she was 19. Two years later she married Julian Gough, a jazz saxophonist, musical director and sometime member of her backing groups, they are also parents of a child. After separating "several years earlier" Trápaga started dating Simon Williams, a lawyer, who already had children with his previous partner. In 2008 the couple were married; as of August 2013 they live in converted flour mill of five levels.

Trápaga authored a cookbook, She's Leaving Home: Favourite Family Recipes for a Daughter to Take on Her Own Life Journey, which was issued in October 2009. In March 2013, with her daughter, she co-authored another cookbook, A Bite of the Big Apple: My food adventure in New York.

== Bibliography ==
- Trápaga, Monica (2009). She's Leaving Home: Favourite Family Recipes for a Daughter to Take on Her Own Life Journey. illustrated by Meredith Gaston. Penguin Group Australia. ISBN 978-1-92138-206-2.
- Trápaga, Monica; Tulloch, Lil (2013). A Bite of the Big Apple: My Food Adventure in New York. Penguin Group Australia. ISBN 978-1-92138-305-2.

== Discography ==
=== Contemporary and jazz ===
Pardon Me Boys

- Pardon Me Boys (February 1988)

Monica and the Moochers

- Too Darn Hot (August 1990)
- Cotton on the Breeze (November 1991)

Monica Trapaga

- Sugar (2007) - La Brava Music

Monica Trapaga & the Bachelor Pad

- Girl talk – M. Trapaga

== Children's albums ==
- Monica's Tea Party (1993) – ABC Music
- Clap Your Hands (1994) – ABC Music
- Monica's House (1996) – BMG
- Monica's Seaside Adventure (1997) – BMG
- Monica's Trip to the Moon (1999) – Festival Kids
- Monica presents I Love the Zoo (2000) – Festival Mushroom

Children's videos

- Monica's House (1996) – Monica and the Moochers
- Monica's Seaside Adventure (1997) – Monica and the Moochers
- Monica and George in the Magic Toyshop (1998) – Buena Vista Home Entertainment
- Monica's Trip to the Moon (1999) – Monica and the Moochers
- Kisses, Cuddles & Moonbeams (2000) – Monica and the Moochers
- I Love the Zoo (2000) – Buena Vista Entertainment

== Awards ==
=== APRA Music Awards ===
Year	Nominated works	Award	Result
1993	Tigers	Children's Composition of the Year	Won

=== ARIA Music Awards ===
Year	Nominated work	Award	Result
1994	Monica's Tea Party	Best Children's Album	Nominated
1997	Monica's House	Best Children's Album	Nominated
1999	Monica's Trip to the Moon	Best Children's Album	Nominated
2001	I Love the Zoo	Best Children's Album	Nominated
