= Aleesha Rome =

- Also known as: Ivy York
- Born: 1981 (age 44–45)
- Origin: Adelaide, South Australia, Australia
- Genres: Pop
- Occupation: Singer
- Instrument: Vocals
- Years active: 1999–2010
- Labels: AMC/EMI; Rough Trade

Aleesha Rome (born 1981), known later in her career as Ivy York, is a former Australian pop singer. Her second single, "Search My Heaven", was released in November 1999, which peaked at No. 20 on the ARIA Singles Chart. She issued her debut solo album, Aleesha Rome (March 2000) and relocated to London in late 2001. Her second album, The Call of Spring (2009), was issued under the name, Ivy York. In 2010 she retired from her singing career due to spasmodic dysphonia, which affected her vocal cords.

== Biography ==
Originally from Adelaide, Aleesha Rome was born in 1981. From the age of nine she sang in karaoke competitions. She started singing lessons from the age of 12 and moved to Sydney at age 17, where she worked as a receptionist. She submitted one of her karaoke tapes in answer to a "Singer Wanted" ad in the local street press.

Rome signed a recording contract with Albert Music. Her debut single, "One of Us Has Changed", was released in 1999. She had started recording about nine months earlier. It was a five-track CD single with the lead track co-written by Barry Andrews and Elizabeth Scott; Andrews was also its co-producer.

Her second single, "Search My Heaven", appeared in November 1999, which peaked at No. 20 on the ARIA Singles Chart. Also in that month she signed a three-year deal with EMI for European and Canadian releases.

Rome's self-titled debut album appeared on 27 March 2000 via AMC/EMI. It was recorded at Albert Studios, Sydney with co-production by Andrews and Sam Horsburgh; Andrews co-wrote eight of its twelve tracks. Ahead of the album she was interviewed for hEARd Magazine and described how, "I just got lucky I guess. At first, when I got the deal with Alberts, I was working part time & doing recording at Alberts during lunch hours, but now I'm doing it full time, so there's something that I always wanted to do, become a singer full time, so even if nothing else happens much, I've already made it to here." In March she toured Australia and then performed in Europe, Canada and the United States. Both singles were later re-issued in Germany.

Frustrated with the lack of control over her music, Rome relocated to the United Kingdom in 2001; and began composing her own songs and playing clubs around London. Under her new persona, Ivy York, she led an indie group, Ivy York Band. In 2009 she released her second solo album, The Call of Spring, as Ivy York, which was produced by Ravi (Rav) Panesar. It was released on Rough Trade Records in April 2010 and was described by Bollywood Spice's correspondent as "Merging vintage-country & western, with Brit-pop and retro Bollywood, injected with a decent dose of indie." She retired from performing after developing spasmodic dysphonia in 2010.

== Discography ==
=== Albums ===
- Aleesha Rome (27 March 2000) – Albert Music/EMI Music Australia
1. "Search My Heaven" (3:54)
2. "One of Us Has Changed" (3:37)
3. "If Only I Could Cry" (4:04)
4. "Without You" (3:59)
5. "I Didn't Have the Heart" (3:26)
6. "Yours Truly" (4:07)
7. "Do You Feel Me" (3:11)
8. "3 Words" (3:38)
9. "Hazy Days" (5:35)
10. "Real World" (4:20)
11. "Search My Heaven (Mont Blanc House Mix)" (3:44)
12. "One Of Us Has Changed (Absolute Spirit Mix)" (3:20)

Aleesha Rome was produced by Barry Andrews and Sam Horsburgh with various remixes by Thunderground, Matt Meyers and The Wah Brothers.

- The Call of Spring (2009)

=== Singles ===
List of singles, with selected chart positions
Title	Year	Peak chart positions	Album
Title	Year	AUS	Album
"One of Us Has Changed"	1999	56	Aleesha Rome
"Search My Heaven"	1999	20	Aleesha Rome
"Do You Feel Me?"	2000	168	Aleesha Rome

All three of the singles were produced by Barry Andrews and Sam Horsburgh with various remixes by Thunderground, Matt Meyers and The Wah Brothers.
