= Now (John Paul Young album) =

Studio album by John Paul Young
- Released: September 1996
- Genre: Pop
- Length: 42:44
- Label: Albert Productions
- Producer: Harry Vanda, George Young

John Paul Young chronology
The Very Best Of (1994)	Now (1996)	In Too Deep (2006)

Singles from Now
- 1. "Happy The Man" Released: August 1996

Now is the eighth studio album by Australian pop singer John Paul Young, released in September 1996. The album was released through Albert Productions and spawned the single "Happy the Man".

Now includes a re-recorded version of "Love Is in the Air". John Paul Young returned to Germany after a 20-year absence to tour this album. He appearing on TV programmes & specials.

== Track listing ==
No.	Title	Writer(s)	Length
1.	"Happy the Man"	Harry Vanda and George Young	4:00
2.	"Groovin'"	Felix Cavaliere, Eddie Brigati	3:34
3.	"Just One Look"	Gregory Carroll, Doris Payne	3:35
4.	"I'm Walkin'"	Fats Domino, Dave Bartholomew	2:53
5.	"I'm Left, You're Right, She's Gone"	Stan Kessler, William Taylor	2:54
6.	"Ain't That a Shame"	Domino, Bartholomew	2:34
7.	"Medley: Blue Moon / Stormy Weather"	Richard Rodgers, Lorenz Hart, Harold Arlen, Ted Koehler
8.	"Love Is in the Air"	Vanda, Young	3:27
9.	"Silver Shoes And Strawberry Wine"	Vanda, Young	8:50
10.	"I Hear You Knocking"	Bartholomew	3:34
11.	"St. Louis"	Vanda, Young	3:44
12.	"Hard Road"	Vanda, Young	3:39
