= The Seabellies =

Australian musical group

Seabellies
- L to R: Antony Martin, Trent Grenell, Sean Kelleher, Steph Setz, Eddie Garven, Kyle Grenell; Manhattan, October 2008

Background information
- Origin: Newcastle, New South Wales, Australia
- Genres: Indie rock; alternative rock; experimental rock
- Years active: 2006–2015
- Labels: Independent; Alberts
- Members: Eddie Garven; Kyle Grenell; Trent Grenell; Sean Kelleher; Antony Martin; Stephanie Setz
- Website: myspace.com/theseabellies

Seabellies were an Australian alternative rock band formed in Newcastle in 2006. The line-up included Eddie Garven on bass guitar; Kyle Grenell on guitars, percussion, bass guitar and keyboards; his brother, Trent Grenell on lead vocals, guitar, percussion and keyboards; Sean Kelleher on drums, horns and backing vocals; Antony Martin on keyboards, guitars and bass guitar; and Stephanie Setz on melodica, metallophone, keyboards, bass guitar and backing vocals. Their live performances display a variety of instrumentation and multi-percussive layering.

== History ==
=== Wave Your Fingers to Make the Winters ===
In March 2007 the Seabellies self-released a six-track extended play, Wave Your Fingers to Make the Winters.

After three gigs the group won the Garage to V Competition, and subsequently appeared on the main stage at the Sydney and Gold Coast V Festival. They were featured as a Next Crop Artist on Triple J, and won the Music Artist of the Year Award from 1233 ABC Newcastle.

=== Digital singles ===
In 2008 Seabellies signed to ABC/Warner and Universal to distribute a set of digital singles. The first, "Heart Heart Heart Out", was issued ahead of the group joining Australian tours by international artists including supporting an Icelandic group, múm, in March of that year. The band played at the CMJ Music Marathon in New York City in October. While in the United States they played in Manhattan, Brooklyn, and Hollywood, including the Viper Room. They were listed in QRO Magazine both as Best New Band and as one which Will Break.

In August they issued their second digital single, "Prairie", which Dom Alessio of Who the Hell described as "returning to their Canadian music influences, building a bombastic tune not alike that of Arcade Fire but compressing their multi-layered sound into more standard song structure fare. It's build [sic] nicely, there's plenty of textured harmonies, but at the time of writing this, the song hasn't grabbed me just yet – and I'm a fan of these guys. Maybe I just have to give it time."

"Feel It Leave", their third digital single was listed as one of the Best New Releases of the Week by Max Hammer of Indie Rock Cafe; he opined that "Their music is rich and lush, full of ethereal electronic sounds, strings, metalaphones and melodicas, soaring guitars and Scandinavian-influenced melodies."

=== By Limbo Lake ===
The group recorded their debut album, By Limbo Lake, in 2009 with Wayne Connolly producing at Albert Studios. The group signed to Albert Music, which released the album on 16 August 2010 with Sony Music distributing.

A reviewer for Beat Magazine observed that the album "asserts itself as a memorable record abounding in beautifully explorative, textural pop... [which] heralds the exciting development and impressive progression of one of the country's finest young bands... [Trent's] lyrics do, at times, appear random and nondescript as they're primarily melody-driven rather than idea-laden, but it's the dreamy landscapes traversed that are most appealing."

TheMusic.com.au's Michael Smith asked Trent why they took so long to issue their debut album, he explained "we figured it might be better to develop a bit and just take our time." Smith felt that "thematically it might be an album about the tensions and struggles involved in its making, sonically the content couldn't be greater, as it washes over the listener with a subtle, sensual beauty of sound that sweeps you away. There's a brightness and almost celebratory quality to the music."

By Limbo Lake peaked at No. 7 on the ARIA Hitseekers Albums Chart by October 2010. Three tracks were placed on high rotation by national radio station, Triple J: "Orange X", "Young Cubs" and "Trans Ending". Trent was nominated in the Popular Contemporary category at the 2011 APRA Professional Development Awards.

To promote it they toured Australia before resettling in Melbourne in November for a residency at the Evelyn Hotel, Fitzroy. On the last night of their residency three group members were injured "after a violent street attack" where "Frontman Trent Grenell suffered cuts and bruises in the attack and keyboard player Steph Setz had whip marks. Bass player Eddie Garven was taken to hospital where he was given stitches in his forehead."

=== Fever Belle ===
The Seabellies became a five-piece group in 2012 to record their second album, Fever Belle, with two producers: Berkfinger (a.k.a. Simon Berckelman of Philadelphia Grand Jury) in Berlin and Tim Whitten in Sydney. It was released on 18 October 2013 via Shock Records. The album was declared Indie album of the Week by Brag Magazine. During November they toured Australia.

== Discography ==
=== Albums ===
- By Limbo Lake (16 August 2010)
- Fever Belle (18 October 2013)

=== Extended plays ===
- 2007: Wave Your Fingers to Make the Winters

=== Singles ===
- 2008: "Heart Heart Heart Out"
- 2008: "Prairie"
- 2008: "Feel It Leave"
- 2009: "Orange X"
- 2010: "Young Cubs"
- 2010: "Trans Ending"
- 2011: "Board the Apartment Up"
- 2012: "Paper Tiger"
- 2013: "It's Alright"
- 2014: "Berlin Horses"
