= The Singer (John Paul Young album) =

Studio album by John Paul Young
- Released: August 1981
- Genre: Pop
- Length: 35:58
- Label: Hammard Records

John Paul Young chronology
Heaven Sent (1979)	The Singer (1981)	Once Foot in Front (1984)

Singles from The Singer
- 1. "Out of Time" Released: 1981

The Singer is the sixth studio album by Australian pop singer John Paul Young, released in August 1981. It was the first album by Young on Hammard Records. Featuring cover versions of 1960s pop and rock songs, the album peaked at number 98 on the Australian Kent Music Report. "Out of Time" was released as the album's first single.

== Track listing ==
Side one

No.	Title	Writer(s)	Length
1.	"Hold Me"	Jack Little, Ira Schuster, Dave Oppenheim	2:38
2.	"Summer in the City"	John Sebastian, Mark Sebastian, Steve Boone	2:47
3.	"Good Lovin'"	Rudy Clark, Arthur Resnick	2:19
4.	"The Fool on the Hill"	John Lennon, Paul McCartney	2:54
5.	"All Along the Watchtower"	Bob Dylan	3:57
6.	"For Your Love"	Graham Gouldman	2:30
7.	"It's Too Late"	Carole King, Toni Stern	3:42
Total length:			20:51

Side two

No.	Title	Writer(s)	Length
1.	"Out of Time"	Mick Jagger, Keith Richards	3:07
2.	"Magic Carpet Ride"	Rushton Moreve, John Kay	2:56
3.	"1, 2, 3"	John Medora, David White, Len Barry	2:35
4.	"Groovin'"	Felix Cavaliere, Eddie Brigati	2:35
5.	"You Really Got Me"	Ray Davies	2:16
6.	"Soul Sister"	Isaac Hayes, David Porter	2:17
7.	"Don't Let Me Be Misunderstood"	Bennie Benjamin, Gloria Caldwell, Sol Marcus	2:15
Total length:			18:04

== Charts ==
Chart (1981)	Peak position
Australian Kent Music Report	98

== Personnel ==
- John Paul Young - Vocals
- Jim Doyle, Stuart Fraser (Guitar)
- Les Young (Bass)
- Rex Bullen (Keyboards)
- Russell Dunlop (Drums, percussion, synthesizer)
- Ralph White (Horns)
- Geoff Oates (Saxophone)
- Karen Smith, Russell Dunlop (Backing Vocals)
