= Pardon Me Boys =

Australian swing jazz-cabaret band

- Origin: Australia
- Years active: 1985–1988
- Label: Festival Records
- Past members: Monica Trápaga; Ignatius Jones; William O'Riordan

Pardon Me Boys were a short lived Australian swing jazz-cabaret band. The group released one studio album which peaked at number 63 on the Australian charts in 1988.

== Discography ==
=== Albums ===
List of studio albums, with Australian positions
Title	Details	Peak chart positions
Title	Details	AUS
Pardon Me Boys	Released: February 1988; Label: Festival Records (D 28788/ L 28788); Formats: Cassette, LP	64

=== Singles ===
Year	Title	Album
1987	"Embraceable You "	Pardon Me Boys
1987	'Beat Me Daddy (Eight to the Bar)"	Pardon Me Boys
