= In Too Deep (John Paul Young album) =

Studio album by John Paul Young
- Released: 4 November 2006
- Recorded: 2005–2006
- Genre: Pop
- Length: 47:04
- Label: ABC Music / Warner Music
- Producer: Harry Vanda

John Paul Young chronology
Now (1996)	In Too Deep (2006)	I Hate the Music (2009)

Singles from In Too Deep
- 1. "Isn't it Sunshine" Released: 2006

In Too Deep is the ninth studio album by Australian singer John Paul Young and first studio album in 10-years. The album was released in November 2006. The album sees John reunite with his 70s hitmaker Harry Vanda as producer and principal songwriter, with whom he worked in the 1970s and became one of the biggest Australian stars.

== Track listing ==
1. "In Too Deep" (Vanda) - 3:45
2. "I'm Living On Dreams" (Vanda, Young) - 4:06
3. "Isn't It Sunshine" (Vanda, Young) - 3:35
4. "Not Me" (Vanda, Young) - 4:25
5. "When You Love Me" (Vanda, Young) - 3:50
6. "Spanish Guitar" (Vanda) - 3:30
7. "I've Been Waiting" (Vanda) - 4:28
8. "Prisoner Of Love" (Vanda) - 4:25
9. "When I Remember You" (Vanda) - 3:20
10. "Having A Few" (Anton) - 3:43
11. "How Can I Live (Without Love)" (Vanda) - 4:09
12. "Oh My Love" (Gamage) - 3:48

== Personnel ==
- John Paul Young - lead vocals
- Harry Vanda - lead guitar, keyboards, percussion, backing vocals
- Daniel Vandenberg - bass on "In Too Deep", "I've Been Waiting", "When I Remember You"
- Billy Kristian - bass on "I'm Living On Dreams", "Not Me", "When You Love Me", "Spanish Guitar", "Prisoner Of Love", "Having A Few", "How Can I Live (Without Love)" "Oh My Love"
- George Young - bass on "Isn't It Sunshine"
- James Morrison - saxophone on "I'm Living On Dreams", "I've Been Waiting", "When I Remember You", "How Can I Live (Without Love)"
- Warren 'Pig' Morgan - piano & keyboards
- Rick Robertson - sax on "Isn't It Sunshine"
- Danny Heifetz - drums
- Louise Anton - backing vocals

== Production ==
- Producer: Harry Vanda
- Mixed by Daniel Vandenberg
- Assistant Engineer: Chris Jackson
- Mastered by Greg Calbi at Sterling Sound, New York
