= The Day That My Heart Caught Fire =

Single by John Paul Young

from the album Love Is in the Air
- B-side: "Lazy Days"
- Released: August 1978
- Recorded: 1978
- Genre: Pop
- Length: 2:55
- Label: Albert Productions
- Songwriters: Harry Vanda and George Young
- Producers: Harry Vanda, George Young

John Paul Young singles chronology
"Love Is in the Air" (1977)	"The Day That My Heart Caught Fire" (1978)	"Lost in Your Love" (1978)

"The Day That My Heart Caught Fire" is a pop song written by Harry Vanda and George Young. It was recorded by Australian pop singer John Paul Young. The song was released in August 1978 as the second single from Young's fourth studio album Love Is in the Air (1978). The song peaked at number 20 on the Kent Music Report in October 1978.

== Track listing ==
7" (AP 11796)

- Side A "The Day That My Heart Caught Fire" (H. Vanda and G. Young) - 2:55
- Side B "Lazy Days" (J. P. Young, Warren Morgan) - 3:29

== Weekly charts ==
Chart (1978)	Peak position
Australian (Kent Music Report)	20
South Africa	20
