= Heaven Sent (John Paul Young album) =

Studio album by John Paul Young
- Released: November 1979
- Studio: Albert Studios, Sydney Australia
- Genre: Pop
- Length: 38:02
- Label: Albert Productions/EMI
- Producer: Harry Vanda, George Young

John Paul Young chronology
Love Is in the Air (1978)	Heaven Sent (1979)	The Singer (1981)

Singles from Heaven Sent
- 1. "Heaven Sent" Released: August 1979 (Australia only); 2. "Love You So Bad It Hurts" Released: August 1979 (Europe only); 3. "Can't Get You Out of My System" Released: November 1979; 4. "Hot for You Baby" Released: February 1980

Heaven Sent is the fifth studio album by Australian pop singer John Paul Young, released in November 1979. The album was produced by Vanda & Young. It peaked at number 95 on the Australian Kent Music Report.

== Track listing ==
All tracks are written by Harry Vanda & George Young.

Side one
No.	Title	Length
1.	"Heaven Sent"	3:10
2.	"Don't You Walk That Way"	3:25
3.	"I Don't Wanna Lose You"	4:16
4.	"Love You So Bad It Hurts"	4:55

Side two
No.	Title	Length
1.	"Hot For You Baby"	6:45
2.	"Can't Get You Out Of My System"	4:10
3.	"I Ain't Ready For Love"	4:18
4.	"Bad Side Of The City"	8:13

== Charts ==
Chart (1979/80)	Peak position
Australian Kent Music Report	95

== Personnel ==
John Paul Young and the Allstars

- John Young/John Paul Young — lead vocals (1975–1981)
- Warren Morgan – piano, backing vocals (1975, 1977–1981)
- Ronnie Peel (a.k.a. Rockwell T. James) – bass guitar, rhythm guitar (1975–1979)
- Ian Miller – lead guitar (1977–1979)
- Jacques De Jongh – bass guitar (1978–1979)
- Ray Arnott – drum (1978–1981)
- Tony Buchanan – saxophone (1979)
- Harry Vanda – guitar (1979)
- George Young – guitar (1979)
