= Here We Go (John Paul Young song) =

Single by John Paul Young

from the album Green
- Released: May 1977
- Recorded: Albert Studios
- Genre: Pop
- Length: 3:39
- Label: Albert Productions
- Songwriter(s): Warren Morgan
- Producer(s): Harry Vanda, George Young

John Paul Young singles chronology
"I Wanna Do It With You" (1977)	"Here We Go" (1977)	"Where the Action Is"" (1977)

"Here We Go" is a pop song written by Warren Morgan. It was recorded by Australian pop singer John Paul Young. The song was released in May 1977 as the second single from Young's third studio album, Green (1977). The song peaked at number 43 on the Kent Music Report.

== Track listing ==
7" (AP 11424)

- Side A "Here We Go" - 3:39
- Side B "Shake That Thing" - 4:49

== Weekly charts ==
Chart (1977)	Peak position
Australian (Kent Music Report)	43
