= Lost in Your Love (Tony Hadley song) =

Single by Tony Hadley
- Released: 1992

"Lost in Your Love" is a 1992 song by Tony Hadley. It was his first solo single since the disbanding of Spandau Ballet and spent 4 weeks in the UK charts reaching No.42.
