= Standing in the Rain (John Paul Young song) =

Single by John Paul Young

from the album J.P.Y.
- Released: February 1977 (EU); December 1977 (AUS)
- Recorded: 1976
- Genre: Disco; pop
- Length: 4:19
- Label: Albert; Ariola
- Songwriters: Harry Vanda; George Young
- Producers: Harry Vanda; George Young

John Paul Young singles chronology
"Keep On Smilin'" (1976)	"Standing in the Rain" (1977)	"I Wanna Do It with You" (1977)

"Standing in the Rain" is a disco song recorded by Australian pop singer John Paul Young. It was released in Europe in February 1977 and in Australia in December 1977 as the third and final single from Young's third studio album, J.P.Y. (1976). The song was written by George Young and Harry Vanda.

The song peaked at number 12 on the Kent Music Report in Australia, remaining on the chart for 27 weeks. In Europe it reached No. 2 in Belgium, No. 3 in the Netherlands, No. 4 in Germany and No. 11 in Austria.

== Background ==
"Keep on Smilin'" was sent to Europe in 1977 to be released as the second single by John Paul Young from the J.P.Y. album as it was in Australia. German disc jockeys preferred the B-side, "Standing in the Rain", and flipped the single. The result was a charting success across Europe: the song reached No. 2 in Belgium, No. 3 in Netherlands, No. 4 in Germany and No. 11 in Austria. "Standing in the Rain" was released as the A-side in Australia in December 1977. It peaked at number 12 on the Kent Music Report Singles Chart.

In an interview with Drum Media in 2009, Young explains “We'd sent over a song called "Keep On Smilin'" and "Standing in the Rain" was on the B-side. There was a guy working for [record label] Ariola, who didn't like "Keep On Smilin'" at all and turned it over and thought this might have something. He decided to sidestep the radio stations and went straight to a DJ friend in a club and it got played and it just bled from there into the charts and stayed in the charts for forty-something weeks.”

In 1987, Young issued The Golden Dance-Floor Hits Vol. 10, a three-track extended play on German label ZYX Records. The album is a part of The Golden Dance-Floor Hits series. It provided two extended remix versions of "Standing in the Rain".

== Track listing ==
European 7" (Ariola 911 130)

- Side A: "Standing in the Rain" - 4:21
- Side B: "Keep On Smilin'" - 3:02

Australian 7" vinyl (AP- 11618)

- Side A: "Standing in the Rain" - 4:21
- Side B: "Same Old Thing" - 3:02

The Golden Dance-Floor Hits Vol. 10 (1987) ZYX Records (ZYX 8–5630)

1. "Standing in the Rain" (Extended Mix) (Harry Vanda, George Young) – 8:05
2. "Love Is in the Air" (Harry Vanda, George Young) – 3:31
3. "Standing in the Rain" (Extended Mix Backing Track) (Harry Vanda, George Young) – 8:00

== Charts ==
=== Weekly charts ===
Chart (1977–78)	Peak position
Australian (Kent Music Report)	12
Austria (Ö3 Austria Top 40)	11
Belgium (Ultratop 50 Flanders)	2
Netherlands (Dutch Top 40)	3
West Germany (GfK)	4

=== Year-end charts ===
Chart (1978)	Position
Australian (Kent Music Report)	65

== 1992 The Bogo Pogo Mix ==
"Standing in the Rain (The Bogo Pogo Mix)"

Single by John Paul Young

from the album Strictly Ballroom
- Released: November 1992
- Genre: Disco
- Length: 3:02 (The Bogo Pogo mix)
- Label: Albert
- Songwriters: Harry Vanda; George Young
- Producer: David Hirschfelder

John Paul Young singles chronology
"Love Is in the Air" (1992)	"Standing in the Rain (The Bogo Pogo Mix)" (1992)	"Happy the Man" (1996)

"Standing in the Rain (The Bogo Pogo mix)" was released in November 1992 as the second single from the Strictly Ballroom soundtrack (1992).

=== Track listing ===
Australian/ New Zealand CD single (659545 2)

1. "Standing in the Rain" (The Bogo Pogo Mix) - 3:02
2. "Yesterday's Hero" (Ignatius Jones cover) - 3:23
3. "Yesterday's Hero" (original Version) - 3:43
