= Lost in Your Love (John Paul Young song) =

- Artwork for Dutch vinyl single

Single by John Paul Young

from the album Love Is in the Air
- B-side: "The Day That My Heart Caught Fire"
- Released: October 1978
- Recorded: Albert Studios
- Genre: Pop
- Length: 3:09
- Label: Ariola
- Songwriters: Harry Vanda and George Young
- Producers: Harry Vanda, George Young

John Paul Young singles chronology
"The Day That My Heart Caught Fire" (1978)	"Lost in Your Love" (1978)	"Fool in Love" (1978)

"Lost in Your Love" is a pop song written by Harry Vanda and George Young. It was recorded by Australian pop singer John Paul Young. The song was released internationally in October 1978 as the third single from Young's fourth studio album, Love Is in the Air (1978). The single was not released in Australia.

== Track listing ==
7"Single (Ariola 100 019)

- Side A "Lost In Your Love" 3:09
- Side B "The Day That My Heart Caught Fire" - 3:04

== Weekly charts ==
Chart (1978)	Peak position
Austria (Ö3 Austria Top 40)	25
Canada Adult Contemporary (RPM)	29
Canada Top Singles (RPM)	61
Belgium (Ultratop 50 Flanders)	24
Netherlands (Dutch Top 40)	37
US Billboard Hot 100	55
West Germany (GfK)	28
