= Green (John Paul Young album) =

Studio album by John Paul Young
- Released: April 1977
- Genre: Pop
- Length: 38:04
- Label: Albert Productions/EMI (APLP-023)
- Producer: Harry Vanda, George Young

John Paul Young chronology
| J.P.Y. (1976) | Green (1977) | All the Best (1977) |

Singles from Green
- 1. "I Wanna Do It With You" Released: February 1977; 2. "Here We Go" Released: May 1977

Green is the third studio album by Australian pop singer John Paul Young, released in April 1977. It peaked at number 19 on the Australian albums chart. The album was certified gold in Australia by the end of 1977.

== Track listing ==
Side 1

1. "Gay Time Rock 'n' Roll" (John Paul Young, Warren Morgan) - 3:52
2. "Just Can't Go" (John Paul Young, Warren Morgan) - 2:57
3. "Down On My Knees" (John Paul Young, Warren Morgan) - 3:28
4. "Shake That Thing" (Harry Vanda, George Young) - 4:52
5. "I Wanna Do It With You" (Harry Vanda, George Young) - 3:12

Side 2

1. "I Know You" (Harry Vanda, George Young) - 5:40
2. "The Same Old Thing" (John Paul Young, Warren Morgan) - 3:27
3. "Here We Go" (Warren Morgan) - 3:43
4. "Bring That Bottle of Wine Over Here" (Harry Vanda, George Young) - 2:15
5. "One of These Times" (John Paul Young, Warren Morgan) - 4:38

== Charts ==
| Chart (1977) | Peak position |
|---|---|
| Australian Kent Music Report | 19 |

== Certifications ==
| Region | Certification | Certified units/sales |
|---|---|---|
| Australia (ARIA) | Gold | 20,000^{^} |
^{^} Shipments figures based on certification alone.
