= Alberts (Australia) =

Australian music company

Albert Music
- Parent company: BMG Rights Management
- Founded: 1894 (as "J. Albert and Sons")
- Founder: Jacques Albert
- Distributor(s): Universal Music Group (physical); BMG Rights Management (digital)
- Genre: Rock
- Country of origin: Australia
- Location: Melbourne

Albert Group Services Pty Ltd, known as Alberts, formerly Albert Music and J Albert and Son, is an Australian music company. The company has major interests in music publishing and production and it earns significant royalties through its subsidiary, Albert Productions which manages the music catalogue of the Australian rock band AC/DC. Alberts was acquired by BMG Rights Management in July 2016.

== History ==
Swiss-born horologist Jacques Albert (1 January 1850 – 9 July 1914) migrated to Rockhampton and then Sydney in December 1884 with his wife Sophie (d. 1890) and their two children. Albert established a clock, watch and occasional violin repair business in Newtown, Sydney in the following year. From 1890 Jacques began importing and selling a wider range of musical instruments, which included a range of "Boomerang" mouth organs. He established J. Albert and Son in 1894 with his Russian-born son Michel François "Frank" Albert (26 March 1874 – 19 January 1962), who took over the company in 1896.

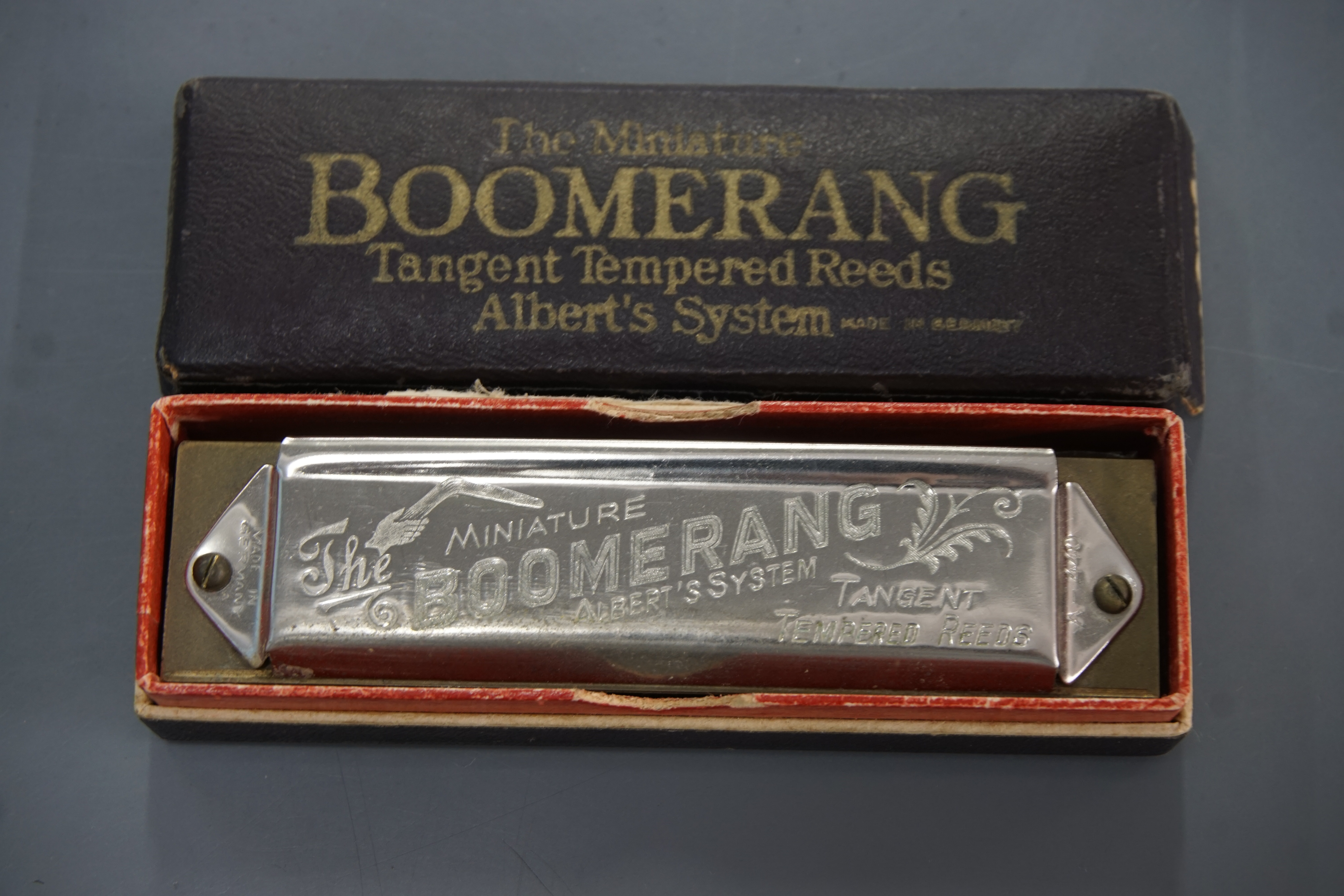
Small "Boomerang" mouth organ

The company trademarked the word "boomerang" and stamped it on German-manufactured mouth organs. The distinctive instruments sold at a rate of 800 a week by 1897. By 1902 J. Albert & Son diversified into music retail and publishing, opening a shop front in King Street, Sydney. Later the company struck deals with American and British music publishers, purchasing the copyright for songwriters: Irving Berlin and George Gershwin. In 1926 J. Albert & Son co-founded the Australasian Performing Right Association (APRA). Frank was also a founding member and director of the Australian Broadcasting Company, which ran the Commonwealth Government's eight national radio stations. When the government resumed the licence three years later, Alberts used the proceeds to purchase an established radio station 2UW.

In 1904 Alberts began publishing the Boomerang Songster, a series of spasmodically issued booklets containing the lyrics of popular songs. The series terminated with #82 in 1972. The booklets are identified by serial number and not dated; one can only guess at the date of publication by the song titles: the cover of Hits#78 mentions (amongst others) Mighty Quinn, Little Green Apples and If I Were a Carpenter. Special "bumper" issues were released to cater for the "Sing-along" craze of the 1950s–60s.

In 1926 Frank Albert built the harbourside mansion Boomerang at Elizabeth Bay, New South Wales.

Frank's son Alexis François "Lex" Albert (15 October 1904 – 10 October 1996) assumed the role of managing director of J. Albert & Son in 1931. Over the next 50 years the company acquired interests in a network of eight stations. The stations included 4BC in Brisbane, 3TT in Melbourne and 2CC in Canberra. In the mid-1950s it became a major shareholder in television's ATV Channel Seven.

In 1963 J Albert and Son's Edward "Ted" Frank Albert (28 November 1936 – 11 November 1990) founded Albert Productions, as a wholly owned subsidiary record label. It is one of Australia's first independent labels and was devoted exclusively to signing and recording Australian pop artists. The Easybeats were an early successful group signed to the label. It expanded during the 1970s when its stable of artists, in particular, AC/DC brought Australia to international prominence in popular music.

In 2007 Albert Music acquired the Origin Network Company which manage the copyrighted work and music catalogues of the Australian recording artists Lee Kernaghan, Richard Clapton, Rogue Traders, Mike Brady, Paul Grabowsky, Joe Dolce, Chris Neal and Cezary Skubiszewski.

Alberts was acquired by BMG Rights Management in July 2016. On 5 July 2016 BMG agreed to acquire J Albert & Son from the Albert family. Alberts formed part of BMG Australia, the Sydney-based operation of BMG launched in earlier in that year. Except for AC/DC and the Easybeats (which remained with the Albert family), ownership of most of the Alberts music publishing and recordings catalogue transferred to BMG. The Albert family retained the rights to AC/DC and The Easybeats, and has allowed BMG to administer those catalogues worldwide. Alberts formed an alliance with Stuart & Sons to manufacture hand-crafted pianos.

== Description ==
As of April 2024, the company name is Albert Group Services Pty Ltd, branded Alberts.

Alberts has long-standing community partnerships in the form of the McDonald's Performing Arts Challenge; working with disadvantaged youth through Mission Australia; and research and treatment through Nordoff-Robbins Music Therapy Australia.
