= J.P.Y. =

Studio album by John Paul Young
- Released: August 1976
- Recorded: 1975−76
- Studio: Albert Studios
- Genre: Pop
- Label: Albert Productions/ Ariola
- Producer: Harry Vanda, George Young

John Paul Young chronology
Hero (1975)	J.P.Y. (1976)	Green (1977)

Singles from J.P.Y.
- 1. "I Hate the Music" Released: March 1976; 2. "Keep On Smilin'" Released: August 1976; 3. "Standing in the Rain" Released: February 1977

J.P.Y. is the second studio album recorded by Australian pop singer John Paul Young, released in August 1976. The album was certified platinum in Australia.

== Singles ==
"I Hate the Music", released in March 1976, reached No. 3 in April and gained gold status. "Keep On Smilin'" was released in August 1976 and peaked at number 15. Standing in the Rain was released internationally in February 1977 and in Australia in December 1977.

== Track listing ==
=== Side one ===
All tracks written by Harry Vanda and George Young, except where noted.

No.	Title	Writer(s)	Length
1.	"Keep On Smilin'"		2:54
2.	"Won't Let This Feeling Go By"	Al K. Hall, Garth Porter, John Paul Young, Warren Morgan	3:09
3.	"The Painting"	George Young, Warren Morgan	4:30
4.	"Take The Money"		3:38
5.	"Good, Good, Good"		5:57

=== Side two ===
No.	Title	Writer(s)	Length
1.	"I Hate the Music"		3:53
2.	"Standing in the Rain"		4:05
3.	"If I Could Live My Life Again"		3:26
4.	"Give It Time"	George Young, Warren Morgan	4:06
5.	"I Still Got You"		4:23

== Charts ==
Chart (1976)	Peak position
Australian Kent Music Report	12

== Certifications ==
Region	Certification	Certified units/sales
Australia (ARIA)	Platinum	50,000^{^}
^{^} Shipments figures based on certification alone.

== Personnel ==
- Producers – Vanda & Young
- Made by EMI (Australia) Limited
- Recorded at Albert Studios, Sydney, Australia
