= Love Is in the Air (studio album) =

Studio album by John Paul Young
- Released: October 1978
- Recorded: 1977−1978
- Genre: Pop, disco
- Length: 34:51
- Label: Albert Productions/Ariola
- Producer: Harry Vanda, George Young

John Paul Young chronology
Love Is in the Air (1978)	Love Is in the Air (1978)	Heaven Sent (1979)

Singles from Love Is in the Air
- 1. "Love Is in the Air" Released: December 1977; 2. "The Day That My Heart Caught Fire" Released: August 1978; 3. "Lost in Your Love" Released: October 1978; 4. "Fool in Love" Released: November 1978

Lost in Your Love cover
- International edition

Love Is in the Air is the fourth studio album by Australian pop singer John Paul Young, released in 1978. The album was produced by Vanda & Young and released through Albert Productions. It peaked at number 32 in Australia. The album spawned the singles "Love Is in the Air", "The Day That My Heart Caught Fire", "Lost in Your Love" and "Fool in Love".

In Europe, the album was titled Lost in Your Love, so as not to be confused with the compilation album released earlier in 1978. This version featured the additional song "Good Good Good".

In the US, the album was released under its original title of Love Is in the Air – and with the same original album cover – but featuring a longer version of the hit title track (length: 5:16), a reorganised track listing, and another Vanda & Young-penned song ("Things to Do") not featured on any other versions of the album in place of the songs "Red Hot Ragtime Band" and "It's All Over".

== Reception ==
Professional ratings
Review scores
Source	Rating
Christgau's Record Guide	C−

Village Voice critic Robert Christgau wrote: "If the title tune seems familiar it's because you tuned it out along with 'Kiss You All Over' a few months ago. The culprits are ex-Easybeats Harry Vanda and George 'No Relation' Young, the power-pop production heroes whose first LP with this singer actually did offer much of the bright thrust claimed for the style—not to mention the triviality that goes along with it. It didn't sell, though, and here V&Y prove their depth of aesthetic principle by mellowing and syncopating their boy into MOR AOR fodder, four leisurely tunes to the side."

Whitney Z. Gomes from AllMusic gave the album 3 out of 5 saying, "Except for his mellow cool and a few Rod Stewart moves, Young does not bring much to the party. Which doesn't matter since Aussie powerhouses Vanda & Young are the toastmasters; the brains from The Easybeats obviously knew they were onto something with the breezy lead single, because both "The Day That My Heart Caught Fire" and "Lost in Your Love" seem like the same song with different titles. "Open Doors" sports Supertramp keys... but otherwise this platter settles for smooth '70s sailing, and nothing's wrong with that."

== Track listing ==
=== Australia ===
All tracks written by Harry Vanda and George Young, except where noted.

Side one
No.	Title	Length
1.	"The Day That My Heart Caught Fire"	2:55
2.	"Fool in Love"	3:00
3.	"Open Doors"	5:00
4.	"Lost in Your Love"	3:05
5.	"Red Hot Ragtime Band"	4:34

Side two
No.	Title	Writer(s)	Length
1.	"12 Degrees Celsius"	John Paul Young	3:51
2.	"Lazy Days"		3:29
3.	"Love Is in the Air"		3:28
4.	"It's All Over"		2:45
5.	"Lovin' in Your Soul"	John Paul Young	4:14

=== European International (released as Lost in Your Love) ===
Side A

1. "Lost in Your Love" – 3:05
2. "Fool in Love" – 3:00
3. "Red Hot Ragtime Band" – 4:34
4. "Open Doors" – 5:00
5. "Lovin' in Your Soul" – 4:14

Side B

1. "The Day That My Heart Caught Fire" – 2:55
2. "Lazy Days" – 3:29
3. "Good Good Good" – 3:59
4. "12 Degrees Celsius" – 3:51
5. "It's All Over" – 2:42
6. "Love Is in the Air" – 3:27

=== US release ===
Side A

1. "Love is in the Air" – 5:16
2. "Fool in Love" – 3:04
3. "Open Doors" – 5:00
4. "The Day that My Heart Caught Fire" – 3:03

Side B

1. "Lost in Your Love" – 3:10
2. "Lazy Days" – 3:29
3. "Things to Do" (Harry Vanda / George Young) – 4:10
4. "12 Degrees Celsius" – 3:41
5. "Lovin' in Your Soul" – 4:17

== Charts ==
Chart performance for Love Is in the Air
Chart (1978–1979)	Peak position
Australian Albums (Kent Music Report)	32
