= Keep On Smilin' (John Paul Young song) =

Single by John Paul Young

from the album J.P.Y.
- Released: August 1976
- Genre: Pop
- Length: 2:54
- Label: Albert Productions
- Songwriter(s): Harry Vanda, George Young
- Producer(s): Harry Vanda, George Young

John Paul Young singles chronology
"I Hate the Music" (1976)	"Keep On Smilin'" (1976)	"Standing in the Rain" (1977)

"Keep On Smilin'" is a pop song written by George Young and Harry Vanda and recorded by Australian pop singer John Paul Young. The song was released in August 1976 as the second single from Young's second studio album, J.P.Y. (1976). The song peaked at number 15 on the Kent Music Report in Australia.

== Track listing ==
7" (AP 11218)

- Side A – "Keep On Smilin'" - 2:54
- Side B – "If I Could Live My Life Again" - 3:26

== Charts ==
=== Weekly charts ===
Chart (1976)	Peak position
Australian (Kent Music Report)	15
South Africa	10

=== Year-end charts ===
Chart (1976)	Position
Australia (Kent Music Report)	95
