= The Love Game (song) =

Single by John Paul Young

from the album Hero
- Released: September 1975
- Genre: Pop
- Length: 3:30
- Label: Albert Productions
- Songwriter(s): Harry Vanda; George Young
- Producer(s): Harry Vanda; George Young

John Paul Young singles chronology
"Yesterday's Hero" (1975)	"The Love Game" (1975)	"I Hate the Music" (1976)

"The Love Game" is a song by Australian pop singer John Paul Young, released in September 1975 as the second single from his debut studio album, Hero (1975). The song peaked at number 4 on the Australian Kent Music Report.

== Track listing ==
7" (AP-10907)

- Side A "The Love Game" (Harry Vanda, George Young) – 3:30
- Side B "St. Louis" (Vanda, Young) – 3:44

== Charts ==
=== Weekly charts ===
Chart (1975/76)	Peak position
Australian (Kent Music Report)	4

=== Year-end charts ===
Chart (1975)	Position
Australia (Kent Music Report)	44

== Personnel ==
- John Paul Young — Lead vocals
- Ian "Willie" Winter – Guitar
- Johnny Dick – Drums, percussion
- Warren Morgan – Keyboards, backing vocals
- Ronnie Peel – Bass, backing vocals)
- Ray Goodwin – Guitar
