= Where the Action Is (song) =

Single by John Paul Young

from the album All the Best
- Released: October 1977
- Recorded: Albert Studios
- Genre: Pop
- Length: 3:04
- Label: Albert Productions
- Songwriters: Harry Vanda and George Young
- Producers: Harry Vanda, George Young

John Paul Young singles chronology
"Here We Go" (1977)	"Where the Action Is" (1977)	"Love Is in the Air" (1977)

"Where the Action Is" is a pop song written by Harry Vanda and George Young. It was recorded by Australian pop singer John Paul Young. The song was released in October 1977 as the lead single from Young's first compilation album, All the Best (1977). The song peaked at number 33 on the Kent Music Report.

== Track listing ==
7" (AP 11562)

- Side A "Where the Action Is" (H. Vanda and G. Young) - 3:04
- Side B "Down on My Knees" (J. P. Young, Warren Morgan) - 3:28

== Charts ==
Chart (1977)	Peak position
Australian (Kent Music Report)	33
