= Hero (John Paul Young album) =

Studio album by John Paul Young
- Released: October 1975
- Recorded: 1974–75
- Studio: Albert Studios
- Genre: Pop
- Length: 42.39
- Label: Albert Productions/EMI
- Producer: Harry Vanda, George Young

John Paul Young chronology
Hero (1975)	J.P.Y. (1976)

Singles from Hero
- 1. "Yesterday's Hero" Released: February 1975; 2. "The Love Game" Released: September 1975

Hero is the debut studio album by Australian pop singer John Paul Young. The album was released in October 1975 and peaked at 9 and stayed in the charts for 20 weeks.

The album was certified gold in Australia.

== Track listing ==
All tracks are written by Harry Vanda and George Young, except where noted.

Side one
No.	Title	Writer(s)	Length
1.	"St. Louis"		3:44
2.	"Pasadena" (1975 re-recording)	David Hemmings, Harry Vanda, George Young	3:16
3.	"Friends"		3:41
4.	"Silver Shoes And Strawberry Wine"		8:50
5.	"The Love Game"		3:30

Side two
No.	Title	Writer(s)	Length
1.	"Yesterday's Hero"		3:46
2.	"Bad Trip"		3:14
3.	"Things To Do"		4:10
4.	"The Next Time"		3:32
5.	"Birmingham"		4:16
6.	"You Drive Me Crazy (Bonus Single 1973)"	Ted Mulry	2:40

== Charts ==
Chart (1975/76)	Peak position
Australian Kent Music Report	9

== Certifications ==
Region	Certification	Certified units/sales
Australia (ARIA)	Gold	20,000^{^}
^{^} Shipments figures based on certification alone.

== Personnel ==
- John Paul Young – Lead vocals
- Ian "Willie" Winter – guitar
- Johnny Dick – drums, percussion
- Warren Morgan – keyboards, backing vocals
- Ronnie Peel – bass guitar, backing vocals
- Ray Goodwin – guitar
