= I Hate the Music =

Single by John Paul Young

from the album J.P.Y.
- Released: March 1976
- Recorded: 1975
- Studio: Albert (Sydney)
- Genre: Pop
- Label: Albert; Ariola
- Songwriters: Harry Vanda; George Young
- Producers: Harry Vanda; George Young

John Paul Young singles chronology
"The Love Game" (1975)	"I Hate the Music" (1976)	"Keep On Smilin'" (1976)

"I Hate the Music" is a pop song written by George Young and Harry Vanda and recorded by Australian pop singer John Paul Young. The song was released in March 1976 as the lead single from the singer's second studio album, J.P.Y. (1976). It peaked at number 2 on the Kent Music Report in Australia, remaining on the chart for 20 weeks. It was certified gold in Australia. It reached number 1 on the South African singles chart.

In 1998, the song was covered by Ratcat and John Paul Young for the Occasional Coarse Language soundtrack.

== Background ==
The song was inspired by a conversation with George Young and Harry Vanda in the Boomerang House elevator after a day in the studio. The conversation involved George's general frustration with a song that he couldn't get to sound right. The song originally had a banjo introduction but was changed to a piano.

== Reception ==
Cash Box magazine said "The song is about a man who 'hates the music' because it reminds him of an old love. The melody is fresh and attractive. The chorus is a hook."

== Track listing ==
7" (AP 11037) (Ariola – 17 220)

- Side A "I Hate the Music" – 3:25
- Side B "My Name is Jack" – 3:25

== Charts ==
=== Weekly charts ===
Chart (1976–77)	Peak position
Australian (Kent Music Report)	2
South Africa	1
Sweden (Sverigetopplistan)	18

=== Year-end charts ===
Chart (1976)	Position
Australian (Kent Music Report)	18

== Certifications ==
Region	Certification	Certified units/sales
Australia (ARIA)	Gold	50,000^{^}
^{^} Shipments figures based on certification alone.
