= Pasadena (John Paul Young song) =

Single by John Young
- Released: January 1972 (original); 1975 (re-recording)
- Genre: Pop
- Length: 3:15
- Label: Albert Productions
- Songwriter(s): David Hemmings, Harry Vanda, George Young
- Producer(s): Simon Napier-Bell

John Young singles chronology
"Pasadena" (1972)	"You Drive Me Crazy" (1973)

"Pasadena" is the debut single by Australian pop singer John Young, released in January 1972 and peaking at number 16 on the Australian Go-Set Chart.

The single was released under the name John Young. Young's subsequent releases used "John Paul Young" to avoid confusion with Johnny Young (no relation), the 1960s pop star and Young Talent Time (1971–1988 TV show) presenter. Young performed the song on Happening 70 on Channel Ten.

"Pasadena" was re-recorded in 1975 for Young's debut studio album, Hero.

== Track listing ==
7" (AP-9765)

- Side A "Pasadena" (David Hemmings, Harry Vanda & George Young) – 3:15
- Side B "Better Go Back to Bed" (Simon Napier-Bell, H. Vanda & G. Young) – 2:20

== Charts ==
=== Weekly charts ===
Chart (1972)	Peak position
Australian Go-Set Chart	16

=== Year-end charts ===
Chart (1972)	Position
Australian Go-Set Chart	89

== Personnel ==
- John Paul Young — lead vocals
- George Young – backing vocals
- Ian "Willie" Winter – guitar
- Johnny Dick – drums, percussion
- Warren Morgan — (keyboards, backing vocals)
- Ronnie Peel – bass, backing vocals)
- Ray Goodwin – guitar
