= I Wanna Do It with You =

"I Wanna Do It With You"

Single by John Paul Young

from the album Green
- Released: February 1977
- Recorded: Albert Studios
- Genre: Pop
- Length: 3:00
- Label: Albert Productions
- Songwriter(s): Harry Vanda, George Young
- Producer(s): Harry Vanda, George Young

John Paul Young singles chronology
"Standing in the Rain" (1977)	"I Wanna Do It With You" (1977)	"Here We Go"" (1977)

"I Wanna Do It With You" is a pop song written by George Young and Harry Vanda and recorded by Australian pop singer John Paul Young. The song was released in February 1977 as the lead single from Young's third studio album, Green (1977). The song peaked at number 7 on the Kent Music Report, becoming Young's 4th Australian top ten single.

== Track listing ==
7" (AP 11372)

- Side A "I Wanna Do It With You" - 3:00
- Side B "The Painting" (John Paul Young, Warren Morgan) - 4:30

== Charts ==
=== Weekly charts ===
Chart (1977)	Peak position
Australian Kent Music Report	7
South Africa	8

=== Year-end charts ===
Chart (1977)	Position
Australia (Kent Music Report)	50
