= Yesterday's Hero (John Paul Young song) =

Single by John Paul Young

from the album Hero
- Released: 10 February 1975
- Recorded: 1974
- Genre: Pop
- Length: 3:43
- Label: Albert Productions, Ariola
- Songwriters: Harry Vanda, George Young
- Producers: Harry Vanda, George Young

John Paul Young singles chronology
"Show and Tell" (1974)	"Yesterday's Hero" (1975)	"The Love Game" (1975)

"Yesterday's Hero" is a pop song by John Paul Young. The song was written by George Young and Harry Vanda and was released in February 1975 as the lead single from Young's debut studio album, Hero (1975).

The song became a worldwide hit, peaking at No. 8 in Australia, No. 1 in South Africa and No. 42 in the United States.

== Overview ==
"Yesterday's Hero" is a song about the fleeting nature of pop stardom. It drew on Vanda & Young's own experiences as former teen idols.^{[1][2][16]}

The song gave Young his first top ten hit,^{[10]} reaching No. 8 on the Australian singles chart^{[10]} and staying at No. 1 on the Melbourne charts for six weeks before being replaced by Hush's "Boney Maroney". The single sold strongly in the United States, where it reached No. 44 on the Cash Box Top 100 in February 1976.^{[17]}

One of the key factors in the Australian success of "Yesterday's Hero" was the film clip made to promote it, which enabled the song to be given heavy exposure on Countdown, which had just switched to its new one-hour Sunday evening format, following the official start of colour TV broadcasting on 1 March 1975.^{[2][18][19]} Young's debut performance on Countdown had him miming "Yesterday's Hero" while dressed in a sailor's suit surrounded on an island stage by a studio audience of screaming teen girls.^{[20]} He was dragged off the stage three times by audience members and the microphone cord was ripped out but the song continued uninterrupted.^{[20]} ABC TV producer, Michael Shrimpton believes his show, Countdown, played a big part in making "Yesterday's Hero" and Young a teen pop success.^{[18]}

== Reception ==
In April 1975, Molly Meldrum wrote in his Listener In-TV column "Now, if this record is not a hit all over Australia then I'll burn my Beatles collection".

Cash Box magazine said "Heavy guitar riffs compliment the wailing vocal of John Paul as he rocks and rolls. Catchy lyrics and raunchy beat will incense copy artists who didn't think of it first."

== Track listing ==
7" (AP-10688) / (Ariola 16631 AT)

- Side A "Yesterday's Hero" - 3:43
- Side B "The Next Time" - 3:30

== Charts ==
=== Weekly charts ===
Chart (1975–77)	Peak position
Australia (Kent Music Report)	8
Canada RPM Top Singles	54
South Africa	1
Sweden (Sverigetopplistan)	10
US Billboard Hot 100	42

=== Year-end charts ===
Chart (1975)	Position
Australia (Kent Music Report)	32
South Africa	10

== Bay City Rollers version ==
Bay City Rollers covered the song in 1976 on their album Dedication. It was released as a single and reached No. 54 on the Billboard Hot 100 chart.

=== Charts ===
Chart (1975–76)	Peak position
Austria	15
Canada RPM Top Singles	33
Germany	13
Japan	
US Billboard Hot 100	54
US Cash Box Top 100	49

== Other versions ==
- Paul Nicholas (1979)
- Laki Pingvini (as "Ne, nisam tvoj heroj", 1984)
- Ignatius Jones (1992)
