= Love Is in the Air (song) =

1977 single by John Paul Young

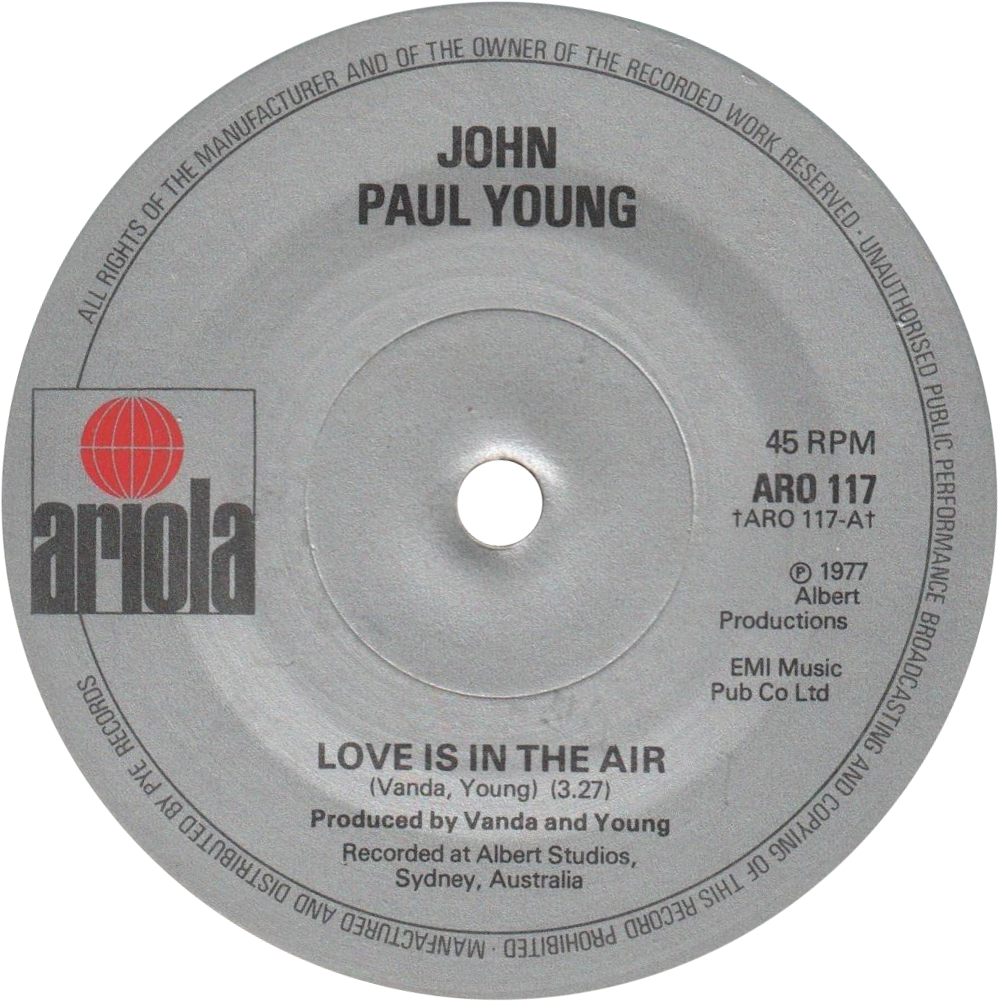
- Solid centre variant of the UK single

Single by John Paul Young

from the album Love Is in the Air
- B-side: "Won't Let this Feeling Go By" (international/Australia); "Where the Action Is" (U.S.)
- Released: December 1977 (international); April 1978 (Australia)
- Recorded: 1977
- Studio: Albert Studios, Sydney
- Genre: Disco
- Length: 5:16 (original US album version); 3:23 (single edit)
- Label: Albert Productions; Ariola; Scotti Brothers Records
- Songwriters: Harry Vanda; George Young
- Producers: Harry Vanda; George Young

John Paul Young singles chronology
"Where the Action Is" (1977)	"Love Is in the Air" (1977)	"The Day That My Heart Caught Fire" (1978)

Music Video
- "Love Is in the Air" on YouTube

"Love Is in the Air" is a 1977 disco song by Australian singer John Paul Young. It was written by George Young and Harry Vanda, and released as the lead single from Young's fourth studio album, Love Is in the Air (1978). The song became a worldwide hit in 1978, peaking at No. 3 on the Australian charts and No. 5 on the UK Singles Chart. In the United States, it peaked at No. 7 on the pop chart and spent two weeks at No. 1 on the Adult Contemporary chart, his only US top 40 hit. The song plays at 122 beats per minute, a typical 1970s disco rhythm. At the Australian 1978 King of Pop Awards, the song won Most Popular Australian Single. In 1992, a remix of the song was released and featured on the soundtrack to the Golden Globe-nominated film Strictly Ballroom. A new music video was also produced.

In 2017, the song was selected for preservation in the National Film and Sound Archive's Sounds of Australia collection.

== Overview ==
John Paul Young said of the recording, "We actually did 'Love Is in the Air' because we needed something for the German market. 'Standing in the Rain' became a hit in the clubs over there and then on the charts, so we needed a follow-up. I'd been to Germany and heard the music. It was electronic mania, all clicks and electronic buzzes. So George and Harry gave it the treatment." Young performed "Love is in the Air" live on episode 148 of Countdown on 30 April 1978 and on Top of the Pops on 4 May 1978.

"Love Is in the Air" was the theme song to Baz Luhrmann's 1992 debut feature film Strictly Ballroom.

Young performed the song at the Closing Ceremony of the 2000 Olympic Games in Sydney.

The song is regularly sung at football matches by supporters of Dundee United.

The song was played at the 2006 Winter Olympic Games in Torino, Italy during the opening ceremony's parade of athletes.

=== Martin Stevens ===
In Canada, Young's recording of "Love Is in the Air" performed significantly more poorly on the charts than in most other countries, due to the existence of a contemporaneous version of the song by Canadian singer Martin Stevens. Stevens had received Young's demo recording, and recorded a version of the song for his 1978 album, before Young's song was released.

Stevens' version debuted on the Canadian charts in July 1978, and had already reached no. 21 by September 9, the week Young's version debuted. The two versions appear to have cut into each other's chart momentum thereafter, with Stevens' version peaking at no. 19 a few weeks later before declining on the charts, while Young's peaked at no. 26 two weeks later. In the year-end RPM charts for 1978, Stevens' version ranked no. 137 and Young's ranked no. 195. Stevens' version of the song was a Juno Award nominee for Best Selling Single at the Juno Awards of 1979.

== Track listings ==
- European 7" single (Ariola 11 705 AT)

A. "Love Is in the Air" – 3:27
B. "Won't Let This Feeling Go By" – 3:11

- Australian 7" (Albert Productions 11710)

A. "Love Is in the Air" – 3:27
B. "Won't Let This Feeling Go By" – 3:11

- US 7" (Scotti Brothers SB 402)

A. "Love Is in the Air" – 5:16
B. "Where the Action Is" – 3:04

== Charts ==
=== Weekly charts ===
Chart (1977–1978)	Peak position
Australia (Kent Music Report)	3
Austria (Ö3 Austria Top 40)	3
Belgium (Ultratop 50 Flanders)	3
Canada Top Singles (RPM)	26
Finland (Suomen virallinen lista)	19
France (IFOP)	31
Ireland (IRMA)	5
Netherlands (Dutch Top 40)	11
Netherlands (Single Top 100)	9
New Zealand (Recorded Music NZ)	8
Norway (VG-lista)	2
South Africa (Springbok Radio)	2
Sweden (Sverigetopplistan)	2
Switzerland (Schweizer Hitparade)	5
UK Singles (Official Charts)	5
US Billboard Hot 100	7
US Adult Contemporary (Billboard)	1
US Cash Box Top 100	13
West Germany (GfK)	3

=== Year-end charts ===
Chart (1978)	Rank
Australia (Kent Music Report)	23
Canada (RPM)	195
New Zealand	35
South Africa	15
UK	52
US Billboard Hot 100	46
US Cash Box Top 100	94

== 1992 (Ballroom mix) ==
"Love Is in the Air (Ballroom mix)"

Single by John Paul Young

from the album Strictly Ballroom
- Released: 13 July 1992
- Genre: Disco
- Length: 4:13 (Ballroom mix)
- Label: Albert Productions
- Songwriters: Harry Vanda; George Young
- Producer: David Hirschfelder

John Paul Young singles chronology
"Don't Sing that Song" (1989)	"Love Is in the Air (Ballroom mix)" (1992)	"Standing in the Rain" (1992)

Music video
- "Love Is in the Air (Ballroom mix)" on YouTube

"Love Is in the Air (Ballroom mix)" was released in July 1992 by Albert Productions as the lead single from the Golden Globe-nominated film Strictly Ballroom soundtrack (1992). It was produced by David Hirschfelder and peaked at number nine in Denmark and number 49 in the UK. Outside Europe, it reached number two in New Zealand and number three in Australia. A new music video was shot to accompany the song featuring footage from the movie.

=== Critical reception ===
Larry Flick from Billboard magazine stated that Young "updates his '70s classic for the soundtrack to Strictly Ballroom with a festive '90s-minded dance beat." British magazine Music Week gave the 1992 remix three out of five in their review of the song.

=== Track listings ===
- Australian and New Zealand CD single
1. "Love Is in the Air" (Ballroom Mix) – 4:13
2. "Scott & Fran's Paso Doble" – 3:56
- European remix single
1. "Love Is in the Air" (Strictly Dance Mix) – 8:27
2. "Love Is in the Air" (Strictly Dance Instrumental) – 5:00
3. "Love Is in the Air" (Ballroom Mix) – 4:13

=== Charts ===
==== Weekly chart ====
Chart (1992–1993)	Peak position
Australia (ARIA)	3
Denmark (IFPI)	9
New Zealand (Recorded Music NZ)	2
UK Singles (Official Charts)	49
UK Dance (Music Week)	50

==== Year-end charts ====
Chart (1992)	Position
Australia (ARIA)	31

Chart (1993)	Position
New Zealand (RIANZ)	31

=== Certifications ===
Region	Certification	Certified units/sales
Australia (ARIA)	Gold	35,000^{^}
New Zealand (RMNZ)	Gold	15,000^{‡}
^{^} Shipments figures based on certification alone.^{‡} Sales+streaming figures based on certification alone.

== See also ==
- List of number-one adult contemporary singles of 1978 (U.S.)
