= John Paul Young =

Australian singer (born 1950)

John Paul Young OAM
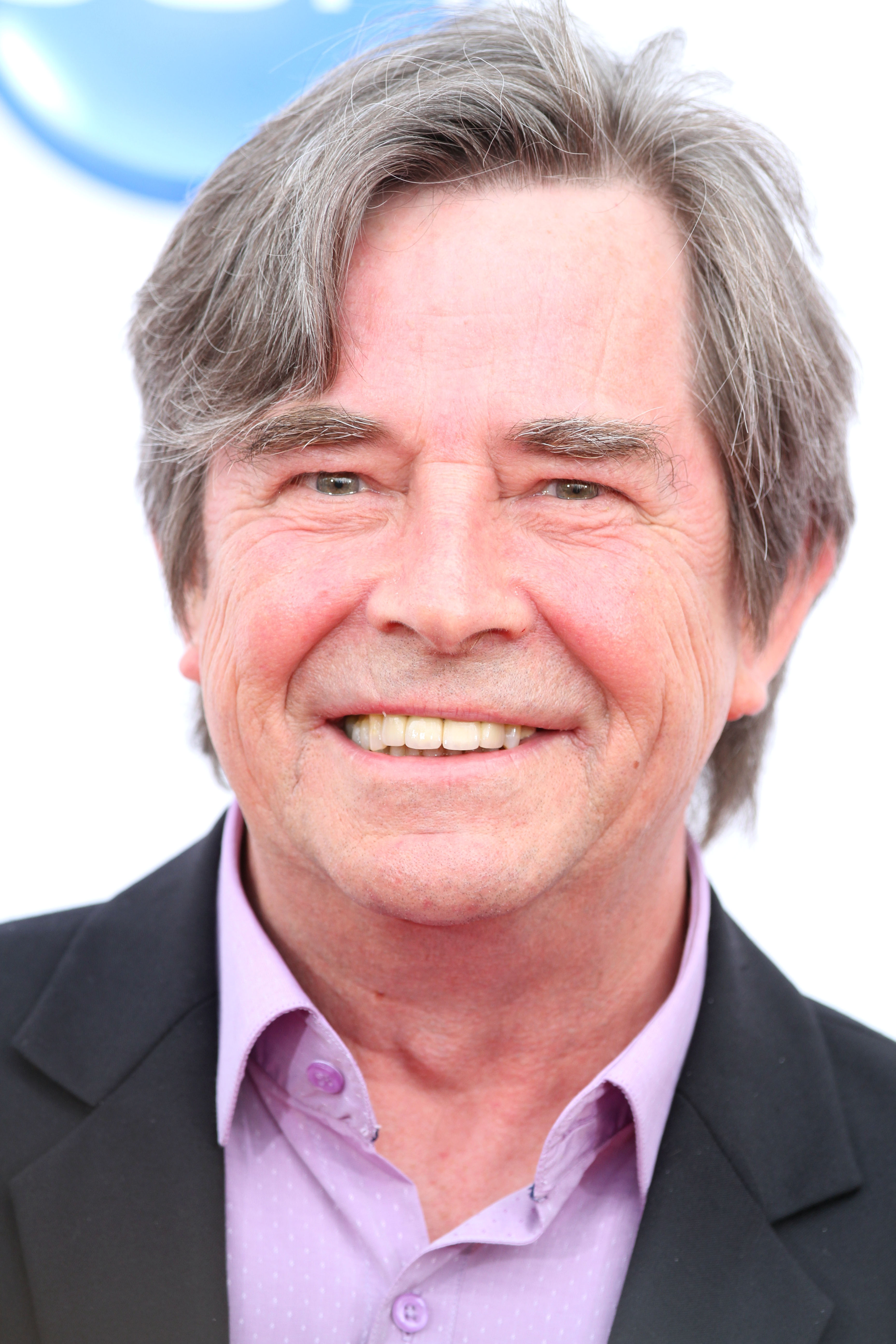
- Young at the 2014 ARIA Music Awards, Sydney, November 2014

Background information
- Also known as: JPY; Squeak
- Born: John Inglis Young; 21 June 1950 (age 76); Glasgow, Scotland
- Origin: Sydney, New South Wales, Australia
- Genre: Pop
- Occupation: Singer
- Instrument: Vocals
- Years active: 1967–present
- Labels: Albert/Parlophone; EMI; Hammard; Boulevarde
- Website: johnpaulyoung.com.au

John Inglis Young, OAM (born 21 June 1950), known professionally as John Paul Young, is an Australian pop singer who is best known for having a worldwide hit with "Love Is in the Air" in 1978. His career was boosted by regular appearances as a performer and guest host on Countdown, a 1974–1987 TV series for Australia's national broadcaster ABC. Besides "Love Is in the Air", Young had top ten chart success in Germany and the Netherlands with "Standing in the Rain", released in 1977, and four other top ten hits in South Africa, including No. 1 hits "Yesterday's Hero" in 1975, and "I Hate the Music" in 1976.

On 27 August 2009, Young was inducted into the Australian Recording Industry Association (ARIA) Hall of Fame.

== Career ==
=== 1950–1974: Early life and early career ===
Young was born John Inglis Young in Bridgeton, Glasgow, Scotland to James and Agnes (nee Inglis) Young. Together with his parents, two sisters and a brother, Young emigrated to Australia on board the SS Canberra, arriving in Sydney on Australia Day (26 January) 1962 when he was aged 11. His family lived at East Hills Hostel before moving to Liverpool. He attended school at Hammondville Public School, Liverpool Boys High School and Westfields Sports High School. After finishing school, he started an apprenticeship as a sheet metal worker. Initially performing as John Young, his first involvement in music began in late 1967 when he formed a band, Elm Tree, with schoolmates.

It was my friends who convinced me that I could be a singer. One weekend I rolled up and they were standing there with two bass guitars and an announcement; that we were going to form a band. I immediately poo-pooed the whole thing because I'd just started my apprenticeship in sheet metalwork and after paying off a car, no way was I going to be paying off equipment or anything like that so they said, 'You can be the singer because you're always singing and you don't need any equipment' – and I fell for it.

— John Paul Young, The Drum Media, 30 July 2009

The other members included Robert (Slim) Barnett on bass guitar, Ollie Chojnacki on guitar, Philip Edwards (drums 1968–1971, 1972–1976), Andy Imlah on co-lead vocals, Dave Kaentek, Ron Mazurkiewicz on keyboards and Geoff Watts on drums. Elm Tree gained a moderate following around Sydney, and after being spotted by producer Martin Erdman, they cut one single for his Du Monde label, a cover of UK band Marmalade's "Rainbow", which was released through Festival in November 1970, but did not enter the top 50 Australian singles charts. In mid-1971 they entered the New South Wales heats of Hoadley's Battle of the Sounds and got as far as the Sydney finals, but they didn't make it through to the national final, and so never managed to break out of the Sydney suburban dance circuit.

At this point, Young's manager Dal Myles got him a role in the Melbourne production of The Jesus Christ Revolution. The show opened and closed in six weeks. However, due to being seen in this production, Young received a telegram from Jim Sharman who wanted him to audition as Annas for Harry M. Miller's original Australian production of the Andrew Lloyd Webber and Tim Rice rock musical Jesus Christ Superstar. The show premiered in Sydney on 4 May 1972, and, as well as established theatrical performers, the cast featured leading pop-rock artists: Trevor White, Robin Ramsay, Jon English, Doug Parkinson, Stevie Wright (ex-The Easybeats), Marcia Hines and Reg Livermore. Young remained with the production until it closed in February 1974; the production broke theatrical attendance records in its two-year season, and whilst it provided him with a public profile, it left him at a loose end when it concluded.

For Young, a major break occurred at an Elm Tree performance when visiting producer and manager, Simon Napier-Bell, heard them in a pub in Newcastle in 1971. He persuaded Young to sign as a solo artist to Albert Productions—the company that had produced Australia's top 1960s group The Easybeats. Napier-Bell then produced Young's first hit single, "Pasadena", at Armstrong Studios in Melbourne; it was co-written by George Young (also Scottish-born, but no relation) and Harry Vanda of The Easybeats, together with British actor David Hemmings who was a partner in Napier-Bell's label, SNB Records. Vanda & Young also produced AC/DC and other Albert Productions artists. All he had to do was sing over the demo tape Vanda/Young had sent from London. The single was released under the name, John Young, later releases used "John Paul Young" (Paul was his Catholic confirmation name) to avoid confusion with Johnny Young (no relation), the 1960s pop star and Young Talent Time (1971–1988 TV show) presenter. He performed the song on Happening 70 on Channel Ten. "Pasadena" peaked at No. 16 in the Australian Singles charts in early 1972. It was followed by "You Drive Me Crazy" which was released in February 1973 but failed to chart.

"Pasadena" had been a hit [but] nobody knew what I looked like. Everybody thought the song was American and basically that was that. It faded away and the ... Superstar – two and a half years of absolute gold – finished.

— John Paul Young

Young renewed his association with Albert Productions, signing with them as a solo artist. Vanda & Young had returned to Australia from UK in 1973. After his stint in Superstar, they took over as his producers and resumed writing songs for him. Young's third single "It's Only Love" was released in March 1974, but failed to chart in the top 50. The B side was a track called "Bad Trip". Young said "no one liked it. It was a disappointment. It was about suicide but they must've thought it was about drugs because of the title. It wasn't banned or anything, they just didn't play it." Young considered a part in the musical Godspell but decided against it, preferring to go back to sheet metal work. He left the job after a day and a half due to being hassled by the boss.

=== 1975–1977: Australian chart success ===
In February 1975, Young released "Yesterday's Hero", a song about the fleeting nature of pop stardom which drew on Vanda & Young's own experiences as former teen idols. The single shot into the national charts in April and gave Young his first top ten hit, reaching No. 8 on the Australian singles chart. The single sold strongly in the United States, where it reached No. 44 on the Cash Box Top 100 in February 1976. One of the key factors in the Australian success of "Yesterday's Hero" was the film clip made to promote it, which enabled the song to be given heavy exposure on Countdown, which had just switched to its new one-hour Sunday evening format, following the official start of colour TV broadcasting on 1 March 1975. Young's debut performance on Countdown had him miming "Yesterday's Hero" while dressed in a sailor's suit surrounded on an island stage with a studio audience of screaming teen girls. He was dragged off the stage three times by audience members and the microphone cord was ripped out but the song continued uninterrupted. ABC TV producer, Michael Shrimpton believes his show, Countdown, played a big part in making "Yesterday's Hero" and Young a teen pop success.

John Paul Young was the first male singer that the show chose to make a megastar. It was an experiment. Could we actually take someone who was basically unknown and in a matter of two months turn him into a number one hit?

— Michael Shrimpton

By mid-1975, Countdown's talent co-ordinator, Ian "Molly" Meldrum, had started appearing on-screen with a weekly rock report. Young, as guest host, introduced Meldrum's second report, "Here's boring old Molly with boring old humdrum".—"Molly" Meldrum's Humdrum and Countdown continued until 1987, with Young often featured as a performer or guest host named "Squeak" or "JPY" by Meldrum. For touring purposes Young fronted John Paul Young and The All Stars, with members who had worked with Vanda and Young's former bandmate Stevie Wright. The All Stars included, Warren Morgan (ex-Chain, Billy Thorpe & the Aztecs) on piano and vocals, who co-wrote songs with Young. Other early members were, Kevin Borich (La De Da's) on guitar, Johnny Dick (Max Merritt & the Meteors, Billy Thorpe & the Aztecs) on drums, Ronnie Peel (aka "Rockwell T James", Missing Links, La De Da's) on bass guitar and Ian Winter (Carson, Daddy Cool) on guitar. Billy Thorpe reportedly said they were the best rock band in Australia.

Throughout 1975, Young toured with Stevie Wright, Sherbet and Stylus, with the latter also being his backing band. Young headlined his first concert tour over the Christmas period of 1975–6, preferring to use local bands as their support acts.

Young's debut studio album, Hero was released in October 1975 and peaked at No. 9 on the Australian Album charts. A string of top 10 hits, written and produced by Vanda & Young, followed in Australia including "The Love Game" (peaked at No. 4 in September 1975), "I Hate the Music" (No. 2, April 1976) and "I Wanna Do It with You" (No. 7, May 1977). Young's second studio album, J.P.Y. was released in August 1976 and also peaked at No. 9. In addition to his Australian success, Young achieved top 20 hit singles in Sweden, with "Yesterday's Hero" and "I Hate the Music", and in South Africa where "I Hate the Music" and "Yesterday's Hero" were No. 1 hits, and "Keep on Smilin'" and "I Wanna Do It with You" were top ten hits. In May 1977, Young released his third studio album, Green, which peaked at No. 19.

In a 1976 Rolling Stone interview, Young gives an insight into working with the Vanda/Young team:

After I recorded Pasadena our relationship just developed. They play me their songs and say: "See what you think of this." Usually I like it, sometimes I don't. Sometimes I pick out something they've written and say "I want to do this", like I did with Things to do. (For the JPY album), we worked out some of the songs on the road. Others are worked out in the studio and some, like Standing in the Rain are produced by the studio system. Harry and George work it out and I come in later to do the vocal.

In November 1977, Young's first 'best of' compilation was released, titled All the Best. It was preceded by the single "Where the Action Is" and both single and album peaked within the Australian top 40.

=== 1978–1980: International success and "Love is In the Air" ===
Late in 1977, the European markets began playing "Standing in the Rain", the B-Side for the song "Keep on Smilin'". The song became a top 10 hit in Belgium, the Netherlands and Germany. selling over 400,000 copies.

Young's next single, "Love Is in the Air", became a worldwide hit during 1978, peaking at No. 3 on the Australian charts in May, No. 7 in the US Billboard Hot 100, and No. 5 in the UK singles chart.

The associated album, Love Is in the Air was released in October and reached the top 40 on the Australian albums chart. Subsequent singles, "The Day That My Heart Caught Fire" which peaked in the top 20, and "Heaven Sent" continued the disco style. Young was crowned 'King of Pop' in October 1978. "Love Is in the Air" also won 'Most Popular Australian Single' and Vanda & Young won both 'Best Australian Record Producer' and 'Best Australian Songwriter' at the same awards.

Young's fifth studio album, Heaven Sent was released in November 1979 and peaked at number 95. By mid-1980 Young had left Albert Productions and ended his association with Vanda & Young.

=== 1981–1990: Career decline and Classic Hits ===
Young used session musicians for his 1960s' covers album, The Singer released in August 1981 but failed to reach the top 50. Young turned to a more contemporary electropop sound and adult oriented style. He signed to the Australian branch of German label I.C. Records in 1983 and flew to Germany with producer, composer and keyboard player John Capek (ex-Carson) to start recording a new album, with sessions at studios in Hanover, Munich, Los Angeles, Melbourne and Sydney. Most of the material was co-written by Capek and Canadian Marc Jordan. The resulting album, One Foot in Front was released in March 1984. The lead single, "Soldier of Fortune", peaked at No. 17 on the national singles chart, other singles "War Games", "L.A. Sunset" and "Call the Night" (1984) all failed to chart into the top 50, "Soldier of Fortune" gained further prominence when it was picked as the theme song for the 1984 Summer Paralympics held in New York City, and also went on to be a hit in Germany.

On 25 January 1988 Young performed in the 'Royal Command, New South Wales Bicentennial Concert' in front of the Prince and Princess of Wales at the Sydney Entertainment Centre. Televised across Australia, the event was viewed by over 10 million people and prompted an invitation to appear at World Expo 88 in Brisbane.

In late 1988, Young and his family moved to Lake Macquarie near Newcastle. Newcastle's first FM radio station, New FM, was preparing to open in 1989 and Young was asked to head their All-Australian programme, Oz Made Mondays. The programme was successful with Young moving through the ranks of the station to Morning Announcer garnering four No. 1 rating spots for his Breakfast and Drive Time programmes along the way. A compilation album titled Classic Hits was released in 1988, including the new single "Don't Sing That Song", but failed to chart.

=== 1991–2003: Career revival, theatre, Olympic Games and Australian citizen ===
In 1992, an Australian comedy film titled Strictly Ballroom was released. The film and associated soundtrack featured new versions of "Love Is in the Air" and "Standing in the Rain", both of which were released as singles. "Love Is in the Air" peaked at No. 3 on the Australian Singles Charts and was a top 50 hit in the UK. In 1994 Young left 105.3 NEWFM in Newcastle and joined 2CH in Sydney, which only lasted six months.

On 4 November 1994, Young became a naturalised Australian citizen and received his papers from then Prime Minister, Paul Keating.

In 1996, Young released his eighth studio album and first since 1984. Titled Now, it is a covers album and includes a re-recording of "Love Is in the Air". In 1997, Young made two trips to Germany following invitations to perform on a host of national and European television specials and to promote Now. Young returned to Germany in 1998 with The Allstar band for a month-long tour On returning to Australia Young joined the stage production of Leader of the Pack playing the role of Gus Sharkey (aka Phil Spector).

In 2000, he played to his largest audience as a featured performer at the closing ceremony of the 2000 Summer Olympics. Young was recorded on DVD for three songs at the Gimme Ted benefit concert held on 9 March 2001. From 8 August 2001, ABC-TV broadcast a six-part documentary, Long Way to the Top which chronicled 50 years of rock 'n' roll in Australia, Young featured in "Episode 4: Berserk warriors 1973–1981". For the associated Long Way to the Top Tour in August–September 2002, Young re-formed the All-Star Band with Juan Gonzales on guitar, Warren Morgan on piano, Ronnie Peel on bass guitar, Greg Plimmer on drums and Michael Walker on synthesiser. From 12 October 2003, ABC broadcast, Love Is in the Air, a five-part documentary on Australian pop music with "Episode 3: Strange Fruit" describing Countdown and how Young was made into a pop star.

=== 2004–present: Popstars Live, In Too Deep and ARIA Hall of Fame ===
In 2004, Young became mentor for contestants on the music talent show, Popstars Live, which was broadcast on Seven Network from February 2004. Young left the show in April, a spokesperson for the producers of Popstars Live denied that he had been sacked. In 2005 Young reprised his role as Gus Sharkey in the musical, 'Leader of the Pack'.

In 2006, Young returned to the studio with Harry Vanda and released In Too Deep in September. Young appeared on the Countdown Spectacular concert series in Australia during June–August in 2006 and on the Countdown Spectacular 2 during August–September 2007. Young co-hosted the 2007 event with Ian Meldrum. In 2008, Young worked on a musical comedy titled Van Park, which focuses on "a group of fellow music lovers have gathered to live out their remaining years" in a caravan park. Young plays Akbar, one of the co-owners of the park.

On 27 August 2009, Young was inducted into the Australian Recording Industry Association (ARIA) Hall of Fame alongside Kev Carmody, The Dingoes, Little Pattie and Mental As Anything. Upon the announcement Young said, "It's an honour to be inducted into the ARIA Hall of Fame, now point me to the lounge room, I wonder who's in there." At the ceremony, Meldrum inducted Young who then performed, "I Hate the Music", "Yesterday's Hero" and "Love is in the Air". Sony Music Australia released the compilation I Hate the Music.

In 2012, Young was awarded a Medal of the Order of Australia (OAM) for service to the performing arts as a singer and songwriter, and through support for a range of charitable organisations. In a statement, John Paul Young said, "I give my time when I can to assist many charities and not-for-profit organisations, but this is a small contribution compared to the enormous amount of unpaid work volunteers undertake for the good of their communities and society in Australia."

In 2015, Young appeared on the fifteenth season of Dancing with the Stars. He was the first contestant eliminated.

Late in 2015, Young toured a show across Australia based on a complete set of Vanda and Young material. In 2016, Young joined Jon Stevens, Kate Ceberano and Daryl Braithwaite for the APIA Good Times tour.

In 2019, Young released his autobiography JPY (ISBN 1760790516).

In 2022, he released his first new song in 15 years, "Felt Like Love", and performed nationally on his anniversary tour 50 Years Young. Young was forced to cancel much of the tour due to ongoing health issues.

== Sporting associations ==
During the 1980s, Young's 1978 hit "Love is in the Air" was adopted by fans of Scottish Premier League football team Dundee United as an unofficial club anthem. Played since then at many home matches, it was sung in its entirety by an estimated 28,000 fans before and after the 2010 Scottish Cup Final held on 15 May at Hampden Park in Glasgow.

== Community work ==
For many years, Young has supported children's charities. He participates in the NSW Variety Bash as a participant in one of the old cars and also to entertain along the way. He also supports the children's emergency transport service NETS through its 4WD4Kids fundraiser. Young is also an avid environmentalist, supporting Landcare projects in his local community.

== Discography ==
=== Studio albums ===
- Hero (1975)
- J.P.Y. (1976)
- Green (1977)
- Love Is in the Air (1978)
- Heaven Sent (1979)
- The Singer (1981)
- One Foot in Front (1983)
- Now (1996)
- In Too Deep (2006)

== Awards and nominations ==
=== ARIA Music Awards ===
The ARIA Music Awards is an annual awards ceremony that recognises excellence, innovation, and achievement across all genres of Australian music. They commenced in 1987. Young was inducted into the Hall of Fame in 2009.

Year	Nominee / work	Award	Result
2009	himself	ARIA Hall of Fame	inductee

=== APRA Awards ===
The APRA Awards are presented annually from 1982 by the Australasian Performing Right Association (APRA).

Year	Nominee / work	Award	Result
2004	"Love Is in the Air" – Young – Vanda & Young	Most Performed Australian Work Overseas	Won

=== Helpmann Awards ===
The Helpmann Awards is an awards show, celebrating live entertainment and performing arts in Australia, presented by industry group Live Performance Australia since 2001. Note: 2020 and 2021 were cancelled due to the COVID-19 pandemic.

Year	Nominee / work	Award	Result	Ref.
2008	John Paul Young – Shout! The Legend of The Wild One	Best Male Actor in a Supporting Role in a Musical	Nominated	

=== King of Pop Awards ===
The King of Pop Awards were voted by the readers of TV Week. The King of Pop award started in 1967 and ran through to 1978.

Year	Nominee / work	Award	Result
1978	himself	King of Pop	Won
1978	"Love Is in the Air"	Most Popular Australian Single	Won

=== TV Week / Countdown Awards ===
Countdown was an Australian pop music TV series on national broadcaster ABC-TV from 1974 to 1987, it presented music awards from 1979 to 1987, initially in conjunction with magazine TV Week. The TV Week / Countdown Awards were a combination of popular-voted and peer-voted awards.

Year	Nominee / work	Award	Result
1979	himself	Most Popular Male Performer	Nominated

== Band members ==
=== Current members ===
Warren Morgan, Donovan Whitworth III, Greg Plimmer, Floyd Vincent, Darren Hoad and Paul Kirtley.

=== Allstars ===
Arranged chronologically:
John Paul Young and the Allstars

- John Young/John Paul Young — lead vocals (1975–1981)
- Kevin Borich – lead guitar (1975)
- Johnny Dick – drums (1975–1977, died 2017)
- Warren Morgan – piano, backing vocals (1975, 1977–1981)
- Ronnie Peel (aka Rockwell T. James) – bass guitar, rhythm guitar (1975–1979; died 2021)
- Ian "Willie" Winter – guitar (1975–1977)
- Ray Goodwin – guitar (1975–1976)
- Dallas McDermott – bass guitar (1977–1978)
- Phil Manning – lead guitar (1977)
- Ian Miller – lead guitar (1977–1979)
- Jacques De Jongh – bass guitar (1978–1979)
- Ray Arnott – drum (1978–1981)
- Tony Buchanan – saxophone (1979)
- Harry Vanda – guitar (1979)
- George Young – guitar (1979)
- Billy Rogers – saxophone (1980–1981)
- John Young (no relation) – bass guitar (1980–1981)
- Vince Melouney – guitar (1981)
- Peter Northcote – saxophone, keyboards (1981)

John Paul Young's Allstars

- John Paul Young – lead vocals (1986–1989, 2002–present)
- Juan Gonzales – guitar, backing vocals (1986–1989, 2002–2020; died 2022)
- Warren Morgan – piano, backing vocals (1986–1989, 2002–present)
- Floyd Vincent – guitar (1986–1989, 2020–present)
- Ronnie Peel – bass guitar, backing vocals (1986–1989, 2002–2019; died 2021)
- Donovan Whitworth – bass guitar, backing vocals (2019–present)
- Greg Plimmer – drums (1986–1989, 2002–present)
- Michael Walker – guitar, keyboards, backing vocals (1986–1989, 2002–2020)
- Darren Hoad – guitar, keyboards, backing vocals (2021–present)
