= Albert Productions =

Australian rock 'n' roll record label

- Parent company: J. Albert & Son Pty Ltd (BMG Rights Management)
- Founded: 1963
- Founder: Ted Albert
- Distributor: Sony Music Entertainment
- Genre: Rock 'n' Roll, Various
- Country of origin: Australia
- Location: Sydney
- Official website: www.albertmusic.com

Albert Productions, a division of music publishing and recording company Albert Music, is one of Australia's longest established independent record labels to specialise in rock and roll music. The label was founded in 1963 by Ted Albert, whose family owned and operated the Sydney music publishing house J. Albert & Son.

== History ==
During the 1960s, Albert Productions operated like other similar companies, such as those founded by record producers Joe Meek, Phil Spector or Shel Talmy. Typically, these companies discovered and signed new pop performers and groups, produced their recordings independently, then leased the finished product to established record labels, who handled their release, distribution and promotion.

Ted Albert signed two of the most important Australian groups of the mid-1960s, Billy Thorpe & The Aztecs and The Easybeats. Their recordings were released through a deal with EMI's subsidiary label Parlophone and included some of the biggest Australian hits of the decade, most of which were produced by Albert himself and Shel Talmy.

The company curtailed its recording activities in the late 1960s but was revived in the early 1970s, when Albert Productions established its own record label and a state-of-the-art recording studio in central Sydney. Early Alberts acts included Alison MacCallum, Ted Mulry, John Paul Young and Bobbi Marchini, and many of their recordings were produced by visiting British pop svengali Simon Napier-Bell. However, the label's greatest success came in the mid-1970s, following the return to Australia of former The Easybeats' members, Harry Vanda and George Young.

In the last years of The Easybeats, the duo had become both a powerful songwriting team and highly skilled producers, and upon returning to Australia in early 1973 they became inhouse producers for Albert Productions, which quickly became one of the most successful labels in Australian music. In the early 1970s, they produced 20% of the music on the Australian charts, and regularly had three or four tracks in the top 20 simultaneously. Usually working in collaboration with engineer Bruce Brown, Vanda & Young produced (and often also co-wrote) a string of successful singles and albums for acts including former bandmate Stevie Wright, John Paul Young, AC/DC, The Angels, Cheetah and William Shakespeare.

In the late 1970s and early 1980s, Vanda & Young also enjoyed their own successful career as Alberts recording artists, releasing a string of highly regarded albums and singles under the ironic pseudonym Flash and the Pan. These included the Australian hits "Down Among the Dead Men" and "Hey St Peter" and "Walking in the Rain", which was later covered by Grace Jones.

The Albert Productions label is known internationally through its association with hard rock band AC/DC. Vanda & Young produced all their albums recorded in Australia between 1974 and 1978, and two mainstay members of the band, Malcolm and Angus Young, were George's younger brothers. In 2003, Albert Productions established operations in the United Kingdom and then added the Northern Ireland rock band The Answer to its recording artist stable.

Albert Productions does not only specialise in rock and roll: Australian R&B singer Paulini signed to Albert Productions in 2009.

Alberts serves at the local sub-publisher for Famous Music UK, EMI Virgin, Bug Music, Irving Berlin, and Concord, among others.

== Featured artists ==
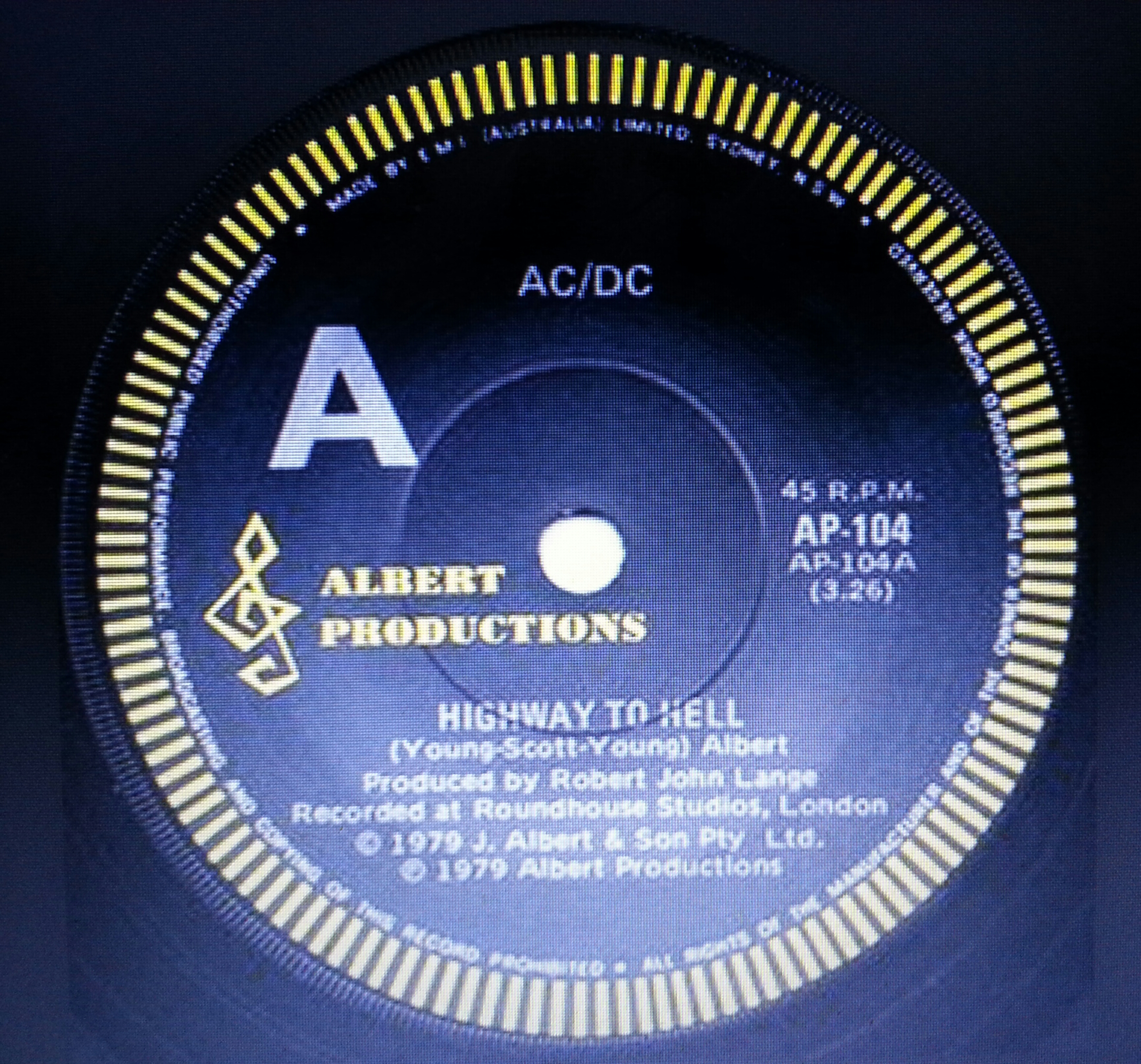
AC/DC Highway to Hell

- AC/DC
- Cheetah
- Rose Tattoo
- Paulini
- Megan Washington
- Minus The Bear
- Acidtone
- The Seabellies
- The Basics
- Shelley Harland
- Eulogies
- Bad Veins
- The Dears
- Darker My Love
- Sea Wolf
- Billy Thorpe & The Aztecs
- Breed 77
- Dallas Crane
- George Young
- Graham Lowndes
- happylife
- Harry Vanda
- Red Top Matches
- Aleesha Rome
- John Paul Young
- Madden & Harris
- Oblivia
- Skybombers
- Stevie Wright
- The Choirboys
- The Answer
- The Easybeats
- The Marcus Hook Roll Band
- The Missing Links
- The Throb
- The Angels
- San Cisco
- William Shakespeare (John Cave)

== See also ==
- Lists of record labels
