= Vanda & Young =

Australian songwriting/producing duo

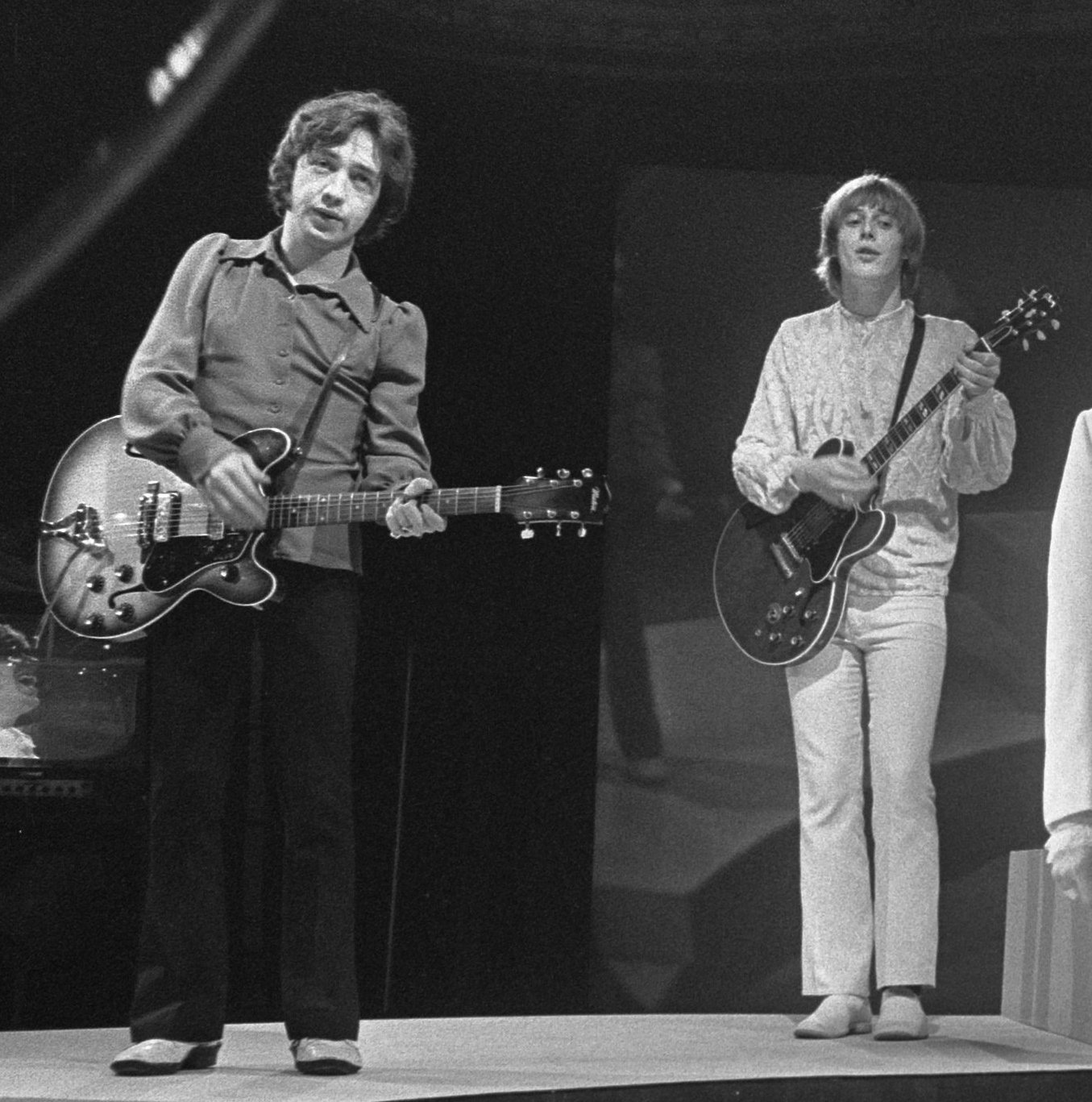
- Young (left) and Vanda (right) performing with the Easybeats in 1968

Background information
- Origin: Sydney, Australia
- Genre: Rock
- Years active: 1964–2005
- Label: Albert
- Spinoffs: Flash and the Pan
- Spinoff of: The Easybeats
- Past members: Harry Vanda; George Young

Vanda & Young were an Australian songwriting and production duo composed of Harry Vanda (real name Van den Berg) and George Young. They performed as members of 1960s Australian rock group the Easybeats where Vanda was their lead guitarist and backing singer and Young was their rhythm guitarist and backing singer. Vanda & Young co-wrote all of the Easybeats' later songs including their international hit "Friday on My Mind" and they produced themselves from 1967. Young was the older brother of Malcolm and Angus Young of the hard rock band AC/DC and younger brother of Alexander Young (who used the pseudonym George Alexander) of the English band Grapefruit.

After the Easybeats disbanded in 1969, Vanda & Young were songwriters and producers for their own projects such as the Marcus Hook Roll Band (EMI), Paintbox (Youngblood) and Haffey's Whiskey Sour (Deram), Flash and the Pan, and for other acts including producing early albums for AC/DC; they were staff producers for Albert Productions from 1973. In 1988 the Australian Recording Industry Association (ARIA) acknowledged the iconic status of Vanda & Young when they were inducted into the inaugural Hall of Fame; in 2005 the Easybeats were also inducted into the Hall of Fame. In 2001, the Australasian Performing Right Association (APRA) surveyed 100 music industry personalities for the APRA Top Ten Best Australian Songs of All Time where "Friday on My Mind" was declared No. 1. Their song for John Paul Young, "Love Is in the Air", was declared the 'Most played Australian song overseas' by APRA following its use on the 1992 film Strictly Ballroom.

== History ==
=== 1964–1969: The Easybeats ===
The Vandenbergs and Youngs migrated to Australia in 1964 under the assisted passage scheme; both families were initially housed at the Villawood Migrant Hostel in Sydney. At the hostel five migrants - English, Dutch and Scottish - formed The Easybeats: Stevie Wright (lead vocals), Dick Diamonde (bass), Gordon Fleet (drums), Vanda (lead guitar, backing vocals) and Young (rhythm guitar, backing vocals). Wright was their initial lyricist with Young composing the music as Vanda's grasp of English was insufficient. They were signed by EMI/Parlophone Records with Ted Albert producing their early recordings. By 1966 Vanda & Young had begun their writing partnership; together they penned the Easybeats' late 1960s recordings including "Friday on My Mind" which reached No. 1 on the Australian singles charts in 1966 and "Good Times" (1968). The Easybeats became Australia's most popular and successful 1960s rock group. They travelled to the UK on 10 July 1966 where "Friday on My Mind" was produced by Shel Talmy in November. In 1967 they toured Europe with the Rolling Stones, Australia in May 1967 and the USA in August with Gene Pitney. At this time Vanda & Young were producing their recordings; by late 1969 the group returned for a final tour of Australia and disbanded. Harry and George immediately returned to England to eke out a living as songwriters.

=== 1970–1973: Based in UK ===
Back in the UK they assembled a group of Scottish musician friends - Alex Young (sax), Bobby Patrick (trumpet), Archie Leggatt (bass), Freddy Smith (drums), and Ian Campbell (bass and vocals) - to help them record a string of songs they hoped would be become hits. On most of these singles a Vanda/Young song would be on one side with an Alex Young song on the flip side. They recorded tracks under various names: Paintbox "Get Ready For Love" (1970), Tramp "Vietnam Rose" (1970), Moondance "Lazy River" (1970) and Eddie Avana "Children" (1970) all on Youngblood Records; "Lazy River" was also released in Australia under the name Vanda & Young (1970, A&M Records - which peaked at number 42 in Australia). It was the only single ever released under their own names. They even tried resurrecting the name of Alex's defunct band Grapefruit for the single "Sha-Sha/Universal Party" (1971, Deram Records). Both were Alex Young compositions. A whiskey company paid them to adopt the name Haffy's Whiskey Sour for their next single "Shot in the Head" (1971, Deram), later covered by Savoy Brown. Their final product for Deram was to be "Working Class People" using the name Band of Hope (1972, unreleased). This song was later recorded by Johnny O'Keefe. In 1972 Vanda & Young formed Marcus Hook Roll Band and recorded the singles "Natural Man" and "Louisiana Lady" in London's Abbey Road Studio during 1973 produced by Wally Waller (Pretty Things) using Ian Campbell on bass, Freddie Smith on drums and Alex Young on saxophone. Two of Waller's songs were used as B-sides. These singles were also released in the USA.

=== 1973–1978: Return to Australia and AC/DC ===
During their songwriting phase in England Vanda & Young dutifully sent demos of their new songs to Ted Albert in Australia. Many of these became hits for local artists: "Falling in Love Again" Ted Mulry; Erl Dalby "Can't Wait for September"; "Love Love Love" The Town Criers; "Come on Round" John Farnham and Alison Durban; "Life is Getting Better" Flake; "Superman" Alison MacCallum; "Pasadena" John Young (aka John Paul Young); "Working My Way Back to You" Bobbi Marchini. Ted Albert encouraged them to return to Australia in 1973 to establish Albert Productions under EMI Records. Wally Waller followed them in order to make an album as the Marcus Hook Roll Band. George brought his teenage brothers, Malcolm and Angus, into the studio for the making of the album "Tales of Old Grandaddy" in order to teach them the process. As house producers for Albert Productions record label, they wrote for and/or produced many Australian chart-topping acts including Stevie Wright (ex-the Easybeats) with the no. 1 single "Evie", Rose Tattoo, Cheetah, William Shakespeare, Mark Williams, and the Angels. Vanda & Young wrote and produced all the hits for John Paul Young including "Standing in the Rain", "I Hate the Music", "Love Is in the Air" and "Yesterday's Hero". They also produced early albums for AC/DC including High Voltage and TNT (both 1975), Dirty Deeds Done Dirt Cheap (1976), Let There Be Rock (1977), Powerage and If You Want Blood You've Got It (both 1978).

=== 1977–1992: Flash and the Pan ===
In their spare time Vanda & Young recorded as Flash and the Pan. They had two hit singles in Australia, including "Hey St. Peter" (Aust No. 5 1977) and "Down Among the Dead Men" (Aust No. 4 1978). They had more success in Europe with hits "Waiting for a Train" (UK No.7 1983), "Midnight Man" (1984), "Early Morning Wake Up Call" (1985), and "Ayla" (1987), from the albums Headlines (1982), Early Morning Wake Up Call (1985) and Nights in France (1987). In all they recorded six albums as Flash & the Pan.

=== 1992–2005: Stiff Upper Lip ===
In 2000 George Young was brought out of retirement to produce AC/DC's 2000 album Stiff Upper Lip. Released by East West Records, it proved an international success, being RIAA certified as platinum in the United States.

Vanda left his longtime partnership with Albert Productions in 2005 and started Flashpoint Music with his sons as a private recording studio. Vanda still resides in Sydney.

In retirement George Young lived mostly in Portugal and England. He made regular visits back to Sydney. He died on 22 October 2017.

== Legacy ==
=== Vanda & Young Global Songwriting Competition (2009–present) ===
In 2009, Australian music publishing company Alberts united with APRA AMCOS to create an international songwriters competition, seeking to acknowledge "great songwriting whilst supporting and raising money for Nordoff-Robbins Music Therapy Australia (NRMTA)."

Past winners of the Vanda & Young Global Songwriting Competition have included Megan Washington (2009), Kimbra (2011), Isabella Manfredi of the Preatures (2013), Husky Gawenda (2014), Gretta Ray (2016), Amy Shark (2018), and Matt Corby (2020).

== Discography ==
=== Songs ===
This is a selected list of songs co-written by Vanda & Young:

- "Friday On My Mind" – The Easybeats 1966 Aust No. 1, US No. 16, UK No. 6
- "Good Times" – The Easybeats 1968 (only ever a B-side on Easybeats singles!)
- "St Louis" - The Easybeats 1969 Aust No. 21, USA No. 72
- "I'm on Fire" / "Watch Me Burn" – Mike Furber 1969
- "Yesterday was Just the Beginning of My Life" - Mark Williams NZ No. 1
- "Life is Getting Better" – Flake June 1971 Aust No. 48.
- "Evie, Parts 1, 2 & 3" – Stevie Wright 1974 Aust No. 1
- "Can't Stop Myself from Loving You" - William Shakespeare 1974 Aust No. 2
- "Guitar Band" – Stevie Wright 1975 Aust No. 13
- "My Little Angel" - William Shakespeare 1975 Aust No. 1
- "Yesterday's Hero" – John Paul Young 1975 Aust No. 8
- "Standing in the Rain" – John Paul Young 1976 Aust No. 12
- "I Hate the Music" – John Paul Young 1976 Aust No. 2
- "Hey St Peter" – Flash and the Pan 1977 Aust No. 5
- "Love Is in the Air" – John Paul Young (1978) Aust No. 2, US No. 7, UK No. 5
- "Down Among the Dead Men" – Flash and the Pan 1978 Aust No. 4
- "Don't You Walk That Way" - Duke Jupiter 1982
- "Show No Mercy" – Mark Williams 1989 Aust No. 9
- "Spend the Night" - Cheetah 1981 Aust No. 31

=== Songs covered by well-known artists ===
- "Bring a Little Lovin'" – Los Bravos, Ricky Martin
- "Friday On My Mind" – David Bowie, Gary Moore, Richard Thompson, Peter Frampton, Rickie Lee Jones, The Shadows, etc.
- "St. Louis" - Little River Band, Warhorse
- "Walking in the Rain" – Grace Jones
- "Quick Reaction" - Al Wilson
- "Yesterday's Hero" – Bay City Rollers
- "Evie, Part 1 - Suzi Quatro
- "Hard Road" – Rod Stewart
- "Guitar Band" - The Living End
- "Good Times" – Amen Corner, Hindu Love Gods (with Warren Zevon), Mott, Shocking Blue, INXS with Jimmy Barnes
- "Runnin' for the Red Light (I Gotta Life)" – Meat Loaf 1995 (actually a reworking of "Good Times")
- "Love is in the Air" - Shirley Bassey, Cher, Tom Jones, Max Bygraves, Anthony Callea, etc.
- "Things to Do" - John Farnham, Cissy Houston
- "Far Shore" - The Seekers
- "The Music Goes Round My Head" - The Saints
- "Black Eyed Bruiser" – Rose Tattoo

== Awards and nominations ==
=== ARIA Music Awards ===
The ARIA Music Awards are an annual awards ceremony that recognizes excellence, innovation, and achievement across all genres of Australian music. They commenced in 1987.

Vanda & Young were inducted into the Hall of Fame in 1988.

Year	Nominee / work	Award	Result
1988	Themselves	ARIA Hall of Fame	Inductee

=== King of Pop Awards ===
The King of Pop Awards were voted by the readers of TV Week. The King of Pop award started in 1967 and ran through to 1978.

Year	Nominee / work	Award	Result
1974	Themselves	Best Australian Songwriter	Won
1976	Themselves	Best Australian Songwriter	Won
1978	Themselves	Best Australian Songwriter	Won
1978	Themselves	Best Australian Record Producer	Won

- Note: Wins only

=== Countdown Music Awards ===
Countdown was an Australian pop music TV series on national broadcaster ABC-TV from 1974–1987, it presented music awards from 1979–1987, initially in conjunction with magazine TV Week. The TV Week / Countdown Awards were a combination of popular-voted and peer-voted awards.

Year	Nominee / work	Award	Result
1982	Themselves	Best Australian Producer	Nominated

=== MPEG Awards ===
The Music Producer and Engineers’ Guild (MPEG Awards) Awards celebrate excellence in music production and engineering in Australia. They commenced in 2024.

Year	Nominee / work	Award	Result (wins only)	Ref.
2025	Vanda & Young	Lifetime Achievement Award	awarded	
