= Run the Red Light =

Single by British India

from the album Guillotine
- Released: 10 November 2007
- Recorded: at Flashpoint Studios, 2006
- Length: 3:39
- Label: Shock Records, Flashpoint Music
- Songwriters: British India (Declan Melia, Nic Wilson, Will Drummond and Matt O'Gorman)
- Producers: Harry Vanda and Glenn Goldsmith

British India singles chronology
| "Tie Up My Hands" (2007) | "Run the Red Light" (2007) | "I Said I'm Sorry" (2008) |

"Run the Red Light" is the third single by Australian rock group British India, taken from their debut album Guillotine (2007).

It debuted on the Australian ARIA Singles Chart at number fifty for the week beginning 26 November 2007.

== Track listing ==
All tracks are written by British India.

CD single
| No. | Title | Length |
|---|---|---|
| 1. | "Run the Red Light" | 3:40 |
| 2. | "Have You Got It Yet" (previously unreleased from Guillotine sessions November 2007) | 3:55 |
| 3. | "Run the Red Light" (video clip CDRom) | 3:46 |

iTunes EP
| No. | Title | Length |
|---|---|---|
| 1. | "Run the Red Light" | 3:40 |
| 2. | "Have You Got It Yet" (previously unreleased from Guillotine sessions' November 2007) | 3:55 |
| 3. | "Black & White Radio" (demo) | 2:27 |

== Charts ==
| Chart (2007) | Peak position |
|---|---|
| Australia (ARIA) | 50 |

== Release history ==
| Region | Date | Label | Format | Catalogue |
|---|---|---|---|---|
| Australia | 10 November 2007 | Shock Records and Flashpoint Music | CD | BI003 |
| Australia | 17 November 2007 | Shock Records and Flashpoint Music | digital download | – |

== See also ==
- 2007 in music
- Music of Australia
