= I Said I'm Sorry =

Single by British India

from the album Thieves
- Released: 24 June 2008
- Recorded: Flashpoint Studios, Sydney 2008
- Genre: Alternative rock
- Length: 3:37
- Label: Shock, Flashpoint
- Songwriter(s): British India (Declan Melia, Nic Wilson, Will Drummond and Matt O'Gorman)
- Producer(s): Harry Vanda and Glenn Goldsmith

British India singles chronology
"Run the Red Light" (2007)	"I Said I'm Sorry" (2008)	"God Is Dead, Meet the Kids" (2009)

"I Said I'm Sorry" is the first single by Australian rock group, British India, from their second studio album, Thieves, which was issued in June 2008. The song contains "brooding pop melodies" typical of the group's debut album, Guillotine. It was listed at No. 37 on the Triple J Hottest 100, 2008.

== Track listing ==
All tracks are written by British India

iTunes single
No.	Title	Length
1.	"I Said I'm Sorry"	3:37

== Release history ==
Region	Date	Label	Format	Catalogue
Australia	24 June 2008	Shock, Flashpoint	Digital download	-
