= Flash and the Pan (album) =

Studio album by Flash and the Pan
- Released: 1978
- Studios: Albert (Sydney, Australia)
- Genre: New wave
- Length: 45:37
- Label: Albert
- Producers: Harry Vanda; George Young

Flash and the Pan chronology
Flash and the Pan (1978)	Lights in the Night (1980)

Alternative cover art
- Artwork for 1979 European release

Singles from Flash and the Pan
- 1. "Hey, St. Peter" Released: 1976; 2. "Down Among the Dead Men" Released: 1978; 3. "Man in the Middle" Released: 1978 (Canada); 4. "The African Shuffle" Released: 1978; 5. "California" Released: 1979 (UK)

Flash and the Pan is the debut album by Australian musical group Flash and the Pan, released in 1978. It was released by Albert Productions in Australia, Ensign Records in Europe, and Epic CBS/Sony in the United States.

The album covers differed between the Australian, the international and United States, and United Kingdom releases (UK pictured). The track "And the Band Played On (Down Among the Dead Men)" — about the sinking of the Titanic — was released as a UK single, reaching No. 54 in September 1978. "Hey, St. Peter" was released as a single in the United States in 1979, and reached number 76 on the Billboard Hot 100.

"Walking in the Rain" was later covered by Grace Jones on her 1981 album Nightclubbing. The song was also recorded by South African icon Johannes Kerkorrel, who included it on his album Die Ander Kant in 2000.

"California" is the only song ever released by Flash and the Pan that was not written by Harry Vanda and George Young. It was written by George's brother Alex, under the pseudonym of his wife Monika James.

== Critical reception ==
Professional ratings
Review scores
Source	Rating
AllMusic	4.5/5 stars
Christgau's Record Guide	C+
Record Mirror	3.5/5 stars

Reviews of Flash and the Pan’s 1978 self-titled album are ambivalent about the vocal style and lyrics, fascinated by the weirdness, but upbeat and sometimes glowing in their overall assessment. Alan Niester in The Globe and Mail calls the album “surrealistic in its detachment at times”, and “one of the strangest but ultimately finest records to surface in the seventies”. Niester concludes that the album is "the closest thing to a masterpiece we're likely to get this year, and you have to have it". David Fricke in Rolling Stone notes unfavourably the “rampant punning” and “mind games” of the lyrics, but says that the songwriters, Vanda & Young, “never underestimate the simple joy of a good hummable tune”. The same reviewer goes on to say that the album is a “flawlessly executed operetta of applied rock & roll knowledge”. Steve Simels in Stereo Review calls the album a “minor pop masterpiece” but says that the synthesiser sound “verges on Eurodisco, with some tacky New Wave organ”. Simels describes the lyrics as “frankly melodramatic […] declaimed (in the verses) more often than sung”. But Simels gives up trying to pigeonhole the record with, “Let’s just say that it’s excellent music and let it go at that.” Jon Pareles, writing for Creem says Flash and the Pan’s songs are “incorrigibly catchy” but he earlier notes the detachment of the vocal style and the insincerity of lyrics; like Simels, he counters his own criticism, saying, “[If] You want sincerity, go watch Merv Griffin.” Simon Frith in Melody Maker factors the experience of Vanda & Young into the album’s “pop mastery, [which is] evident in the hooks, the minor chords, the insidious orchestrations”. When Frith goes on to express doubts about the “bland monotone” of the vocals, saying that it “adds to the joke, but I’m not sure it adds to the pleasure”, he later adds, “But then I’m still listening to this LP, and Vanda and Young may be cleverer than I think, and make easy listening out of this robotic sound".

Reviews compared Flash and the Pan’s debut album to the group 10CC, albeit “early 10CC, before they took themselves seriously”, and “10CC gone maniac”. Alan Niester adds more comparisons: “a hungover Lou Reed” and “Tom Waits with a Jack the Ripper fetish”. Jon Pareles says the music is arranged “Brian Eno-style”. David Fricke notes the “shameless pirating” of The Kinks' You Really Got Me on the song, “The Man Who Knew the Answer”, and compares the vocal narrative in “California” to that in The Beach Boys’ “Sloop John B” – the result sounding like “an outtake from David Bowie’s Low".

== Track listing ==
All songs written by Harry Vanda and George Young except where noted.

Side A
No.	Title	Writer(s)	Length
1.	"The African Shuffle"		4:27
2.	"California"	M. James	4:18
3.	"Man in the Middle"		3:31
4.	"Walking in the Rain"		4:23
5.	"Hey, St. Peter"		4:23

Side B
No.	Title	Length
1.	"Lady Killer"	4:17
2.	"The Man Who Knew the Answer"	4:27
3.	"Hole in the Middle"	4:22
4.	"Down Among the Dead Men"	4:50
5.	"First and Last"	6:39

=== European release ===
Side A
No.	Title	Writer(s)	Length
1.	"Hey, St. Peter"		4:23
2.	"Man in the Middle"		3:31
3.	"Walking in the Rain"		4:23
4.	"The African Shuffle"		4:27
5.	"California"	M. James	4:18

Side B
No.	Title	Length
1.	"Lady Killer"	4:17
2.	"The Man Who Knew the Answer"	4:27
3.	"Hole in the Middle"	4:22
4.	"Down Among the Dead Men"	4:50
5.	"First and Last"	6:39

1999 Repertoire Records CD reissue bonus tracks
No.	Title	Length
11.	"Down Among The Dead Men" (Single Version)	3:22
12.	"The African Shuffle" (Single Version)	3:04
13.	"First and Last" (Single Version)	5:12

2008 Renaissance Records CD reissue bonus tracks
No.	Title	Length
11.	"Yesterday’s Gone (Album Version)"	5:04
12.	"Waiting for a Train (Single Mix)"	3:44
13.	"Something About You (1990 Version)"	3:27
14.	"Hey Jimmy"	3:17
15.	"Money Don’t Lie (Single Edit)"	4:04

Note: The Renaissance edition does not preserve the segue between "The African Shuffle" and "California", fading out and in instead.

Both remastered editions on Repertoire and Renaissance use the US "frisbee" cover and the international track order. The first CD releases from the late 1980s, on the other hand, use the Australian tracklist and cover.

== Personnel ==
- Harry Vanda – production, guitar, vocals
- George Young – production, synthesizer, lead vocals
- Les Karski – bass
- Ray Arnott – drums
- Warren Morgan – piano

== Charts ==
Chart (1978–79)	Peak position
Australian Albums (Kent Music Report)	95
Canada Top Albums/CDs (RPM)	25
Swedish Albums (Sverigetopplistan)	14
US Billboard 200	80

== Certifications ==
Certifications and sales for Flash and the Pan
Region	Certification	Certified units/sales
Canada (Music Canada)	Platinum	100,000^{^}
^{^} Shipments figures based on certification alone.
