= Tie Up My Hands =

Single by British India

from the album Guillotine
- Released: 30 June 2007
- Recorded: Flashpoint Studios, 2006
- Genre: Alternative rock
- Length: 3:37
- Label: Shock, Flashpoint
- Songwriter(s): Declan Melia, Nic Wilson, Will Drummond, Matt O'Gorman
- Producer(s): Harry Vanda, Glenn Goldsmith

British India singles chronology
"Black & White Radio" (2006)	"Tie Up My Hands" (2007)	"Run the Red Light" (2007)

"Tie Up My Hands" is the second single by Australian rock group, British India, taken from their debut album Guillotine (June 2007). During 2007, it reached the top of the chart on jtv's countdown show, and was listed at No. 46 on the Triple J Hottest 100, 2007.

== Track listing ==
All tracks are written by British India

iTunes single
No.	Title	Length
1.	"Tie Up My Hands"	3:37

== Release history ==
Region	Date	Label	Format	Catalogue
Australia	30 June 2007	Shock, Flashpoint	Digital download	-
