= Avalanche (British India album) =

Studio album by British India
- Released: 30 April 2010
- Genre: Indie rock
- Length: 34:01
- Label: Shock

British India chronology
Thieves (2008)	Avalanche (2010)	Controller (2013)

Singles from Avalanche
- 1. "Vanilla" Released: 29 December 2009; 2. "Beneath the Satellites" Released: 26 March 2010; 3. "Avalanche" Released: 3 July 2010

Avalanche is the third studio album by the Australian indie rock band British India, released through Shock Records on 30 April 2010.

Four bootleg live studio demos were released for sale in a package with the album at JB Hi-Fi. The album debuted at number 10 on the ARIA Albums Chart.

== Reception ==
Professional ratings
Review scores
Source	Rating
The Border Mail	3.5/5 stars
The Mercury	3/5 stars
Sputnikmusic	3.5/5 stars
The Sydney Morning Herald	3.5/5 stars

The Sydney Morning Herald's Patrick Donovan gave the album a 3.5/5 rating, saying it "affirms British India's position as one of the most solid rock bands in the country."

== Track listing ==
1. "Safari" – 1:52
2. "90 Ways to Leave Your Lover" – 3:26
3. "Because of You" – 4:29
4. "Friends" – 3:27
5. "Vanilla" – 3:58
6. "Nowhere Boys" – 3:24
7. "Beneath the Satellites" – 3:10
8. "Messiah" – 3:32
9. "Avalanche" – 2:50
10. "Anti-Gravity" – 3:53

=== iTunes bonus tracks ===
11. "Should've Stayed Home Tonight" – 3:22
12. "Drowning in Clouds" – 4:50

=== Bootleg live studio demos ===
1. "Black & White Radio" (Guillotine) original demo
2. "This Dance Is Loaded" (Thieves) original demo
3. "Falling Away" (unreleased demo 2008)
4. "Harry Mulisch" (working demo for 2011)

== Charts ==
Chart (2010)	Peak position
Australian Albums (ARIA)	10
