= Black Eyed Bruiser (album) =

Studio album by Stevie Wright
- Released: September 1975
- Recorded: Albert Studios, Sydney.
- Genre: Rock, hard rock
- Label: Albert Productions
- Producer: George Young, Harry Vanda, Stevie Wright

Stevie Wright chronology
Hard Road (1974)	Black Eyed Bruiser (1975)	Striking It Rich (1989)

Singles from Black Eyed Bruiser
- 1. ""You"/"My Kind of Music (live)"" Released: 1975; 2. ""Black Eyed Bruiser"/"Help, Help"" Released: 1975

Black Eyed Bruiser is the second studio album from Australian singer Stevie Wright. The album was not as commercially successful as its predecessor Hard Road and would be the Wright's final album released with production team Vanda and Young and record label Albert Productions.

== Background ==
After the success of Stevie Wright's debut album Hard Road and its lead single "Evie", producers Harry Vanda and George Young returned to Albert Studios with Wright to record the follow-up album. The recording of the album was problematic as Wright's heroin addition, unbeknown to Vanda and Young, had escalated. During one session, Wright's manager Michael Chugg saw Wright doing heroin, out of sight of George and Harry who were in the recording booth. Chugg walked into the booth and told them to, "Come with me, I want you to see this." He led around to where they could see Stevie sniffing heroin from aluminium foil and said, "There you go, that's your problem, end of story".

== Reception ==
Because Wright was going through drug rehabilitation, he was not able to promote the album. The album sold less than the more successful Hard Road, although the lead single "Guitar Band" reached No. 13 on the Australian Charts and No. 8 in Melbourne.

The compact disc is currently out-of-print and has become quite rare. A digital edition was available on iTunes as of June 2014.

== Track listing ==
All tracks written by Harry Vanda and George Young except where noted.

=== Side 1 ===
1. "Black Eyed Bruiser"
2. "The Loser"
3. "You"
4. "My Kind of Music"

=== Side 2 ===
1. "Guitar Band"
2. "The People And The Power"
3. "Help, Help"
4. "Twenty Dollar Bill" (Stevie Wright)
5. "I've Got The Power" (Stevie Wright)
