= The Wrights (Australian band) =

Australian rock supergroup

- Origin: Australia
- Genre: Rock
- Years active: 2004–2005, 2007
- Labels: Flashpoint; EMI
- Past members: Nic Cester; Chris Cheney; Davey Lane; Mark "Kram" Maher; Pat Bourke; Daniel Vandenberg; Bernard Fanning; Warren Morgan; Harry Vanda; Phil Jamieson; Dan Knight; Louise Anton; Chris Cester

The Wrights were a one-off Australian rock supergroup consisting of Nic Cester (of Jet), Bernard Fanning (of Powderfinger), Phil Jamieson (of Grinspoon), Kram (of Spiderbait), Chris Cheney (of The Living End), Davey Lane (of You Am I and The Pictures), and Pat Bourke (of Dallas Crane). They are named after former Easybeats frontman Stevie Wright, the original performer of the song-trilogy "Evie", which was the group's feature song.

== Background ==
Their first and only single was a cover version of Stevie Wright's song "Evie", an 11-minute song consisting of three parts. "Evie (Pt 1)" was first performed at the Australian Recording Industry Association (ARIA) awards in 2004. They performed the whole trilogy live for the first time at the Sydney Cricket Ground as part of WaveAid, and it was released as a single in February 2005. "Evie (Pt 1)" featured Nic Cester as the vocalist, while Pts 2 and 3 featured vocalists Bernard Fanning of Powderfinger and Phil Jamieson of Grinspoon. The profits for the single were donated to Stevie Wright and the Salvation Army to improve drug and alcohol rehabilitation, as well as the International Red Cross and Red Crescent Movement for the 2004 Boxing Day tsunami.

The three-part single by The Wrights, "Evie Pts 1, 2 and 3", is available on the double-CD album Easy Fever: A Tribute to the Music of the Easybeats and Stevie Wright. (Sony BMG, 2008).

The original single debuted at No. 2 on the Australian ARIA Singles Chart in the week of 7 March 2005.

== Reunion ==
In August 2005 the Wrights provided their rendition of "(Let's All) Turn On" for Stoneage Cameos, a tribute album for Hoodoo Gurus, with individual tracks from that group's debut album, Stoneage Romeos (March 1984), covered by fellow Australian artists.

In 2007, The Wrights made a one-off reunion at "Roosistence", a concert organised by Australian musician Tim Rogers (of You Am I) in a bid to avoid the relocation of the North Melbourne Football Club, an Australian rules football club, which was under pressure from the Australian Football League (AFL) to move to the Gold Coast in Queensland at the time. They played Rose Tattoo's famous song "We Can't be Beaten" (from their album Scarred for Life) alongside other Australian acts including You Am I, Tex Perkins, Something for Kate, Mick Thomas and Rob Clarkson.

== Discography ==
List of singles, with selected chart positions
Title	Year	Peak chart positions	Certifications
Title	Year	AUS	Certifications
"Evie Parts 1, 2 & 3"	2005	2	ARIA: Gold

== Personnel ==
=== "Evie" Part 1 – "Let Your Hair Hang Down" ===
- Nic Cester (Jet) – vocals
- Chris Cheney (The Living End) – lead guitar
- Davey Lane (You Am I) – rhythm guitar
- Kram (Spiderbait) – drums
- Pat Bourke (Dallas Crane) – bass
- Daniel Vandenberg – piano

=== "Evie" Part 2 – "Evie" ===
- Bernard Fanning (Powderfinger) – vocals
- Warren "Pig" Morgan (Chain, Billy Thorpe and the Aztecs) – piano
- Harry Vanda (The Easybeats) – string arrangement

=== "Evie" Part 3 – "I'm Losing You" ===
- Phil Jamieson (Grinspoon) – vocals
- Davey Lane (You Am I) – lead guitar
- Chris Cheney (The Living End) – rhythm guitar
- Pat Bourke (Dallas Crane) – bass
- Dan Knight – Hammond organ
- Kram (Spiderbait) – drums

=== Backing vocals ===
- Chris Cester (Jet)
- Kram (Spiderbait)
- Harry Vanda (The Easybeats)
- Louise Anton
- Chris Cheney (The Living End)
- Davey Lane (You Am I and The Pictures)

=== Production ===
- Produced by Harry Vanda and Glenn Goldsmith
- Mixed by Daniel Vandenberg
