= Counter Culture (EP) =

EP by British India
- Released: 21 November 2005
- Recorded: at Flashpoint Studios Sydney and Melbourne, 2005
- Genre: Indie rock
- Length: 16:19
- Label: Shock, Flashpoint
- Producer: Flashpoint Music

British India chronology
Counter Culture (2005)	Guillotine (2007)

Counter Culture is the debut EP by Australian music collective British India, released on 21 November 2005. It was released through Shock Records.
