= Lights in the Night =

Lights In The Night

Studio album by Flash and the Pan
- Released: 1980
- Recorded: Albert Studios, Sydney, Australia.
- Label: Albert Productions (AUS); Ensign (EUR); Epic (US)
- Producer: Vanda & Young

Flash and the Pan chronology
Flash and the Pan (1979)	Lights In The Night (1980)	Headlines (1982)

Singles from Lights in the Night
- 1. "Media Man" Released: 1980; 2. "Welcome to the Universe" Released: 1980; 3. "Atlantis Calling" Released: 1980 (Sweden); 4. "Captain Beware" Released: 1980 (Spain)

Lights in the Night is the second album by Flash and the Pan, released in 1980. Two singles were released internationally, "Media Man" and "Welcome to the Universe".

== Critical reception ==
Billboard editors placed album review in Recommended section found the sound of the band similar to M and The Buggles but noticed the synthesized talk-sing voices of performers sounds tiring.

== Track listing ==
1. "Media Man" 5:53
2. "Headhunter" 5:51
3. "Restless" 3:45
4. "Welcome To The Universe" 8:43
5. "Make Your Own Cross" 5:26
6. "Lights In The Night" 4:33
7. "Captain Beware" 4:35
8. "Atlantis Calling" 6:03

=== Renaissance remaster bonus tracks ===
1. "Early Morning Wake Up Call" 4:09 [from 1985]
2. "Ayla" 4:29 [from 1987]
3. "Where Were You" 3:23 [from 1983]
4. "Midnight Man" 4:57 [from 1985]
5. "Media Man (Single mix)" 3:36

== Charts ==
Chart (1980)	Peak position
Australian (Kent Music Report)	78

== Personnel ==
- Harry Vanda - producer, guitar, vocals
- George Young - producer, synthesizer, lead vocals
- Les Karski - bass
- Warren Morgan - piano
- Ray Arnott - drums
- Jack Skinner - mastering
- Colin Freeman - mixing
- Gene Grief - album artwork
- Janet Perr - album artwork

== Notes ==
- The "Lights In the Night" album cover artwork features a comic book like illustration of a boy seeing a die fly by. On the three visible sides of the die are American Sign Language (AmSLan) hand signs for "U", "F", and "O" spelling "UFO".
- On the album cover, light strikes reveal part of the front and back covers of the first Flash and the Pan album. If you hold the album cover under a light source, you can not only actually see the debut's cover, you can even read the liner notes.
- The 1988 CD edition (pictured) replaces the original capital lettering for the band name with the font that was used for the follow-up album Headlines, and the illustration is enlarged.
- "Media Man" and "Welcome to the Universe" were edited heavily for the respective single releases. In the case of the latter, the song was bereft of its dark intro and outro pieces, leaving only the middle "song" part intact. Both singles were also advertised with video clips. There was a third single release in some territories: In Sweden, "Atlantis Calling" was edited for a 7" (subtitled "Special Re-Mixed Version"); in Spain, "Captain Beware" was chosen.
- The Renaissance remaster (first released in 1997 as a double CD with the debut, later reissued on its own in 2008) adds four unrelated bonus tracks plus the 7" edit of "Media Man". On this mastering, the seamless transition from "Make Your Own Cross" into the title track was not preserved.
