= Burning Up the Night =

Studio album by Flash and the Pan
- Released: 1992
- Genre: Rock
- Label: Albert Productions/Epic
- Producer: Harry Vanda, George Young

Flash and the Pan chronology
Nights in France (1987)	Burning Up the Night (1992)

Singles from Burning Up The Night
- 1. "Burning Up The Night" Released: 1992; 2. "Living On Dreams" Released: 1992

Burning Up the Night is the sixth and final studio album by Australian group Flash and the Pan, released in 1992.

== Track listing ==
All songs written by Harry Vanda and George Young.

Side A
No.	Title	Length
1.	"Living On Dreams"	3:31
2.	"Vacuum Of Emotion"	3:42
3.	"Ivy Love"	3:36
4.	"Searching For A Headline"	4:45
5.	"Bad Love"	4:05
6.	"Do It"	3:46
7.	"On The Level With You"	3:48
8.	"On My Way"	4:37
9.	"Burning Up The Night"	3:46
10.	"Only The Bad Survive"	4:08
11.	"Secret Eyes"	4:25
12.	"3 Into 2"	4:12

== Personnel ==
=== Production ===
- Harry Vanda – Producer
- George Young – Producer
- Sam Horsburgh Jnr. – Engineer
- Bruce Brown – Mix Engineer
- Steve Smart – Mastering Engineer
