= Waiting for a Train =

Waiting for a Train may refer to:

- "Waiting for a Train" (Jimmie Rodgers song) (1929)
- "Waiting for a Train" (Flash and the Pan song) (1983)
