= Early Morning Wake Up Call =

Studio album by Flash and the Pan
- Released: 1984
- Studio: Albert Studios (Sydney, New South Wales)
- Genre: New wave; pop rock; synth-pop
- Length: 43:55
- Label: Epic
- Producer: Harry Vanda; George Young

Flash and the Pan chronology
Headlines (1982)	Early Morning Wake Up Call (1984)	Nights in France (1987)

Singles from Early Morning Wake Up Call
- 1. "Midnight Man" Released: October 1984; 2. "Early Morning Wake Up Call" Released: July 1985; 3. "Communication Breakdown" Released: 1985 (EU)

Early Morning Wake Up Call is the fourth studio album by the Australian new wave group Flash and the Pan, released in 1984 by Epic Records. It was produced by Harry Vanda and George Young, the core members of the group at Albert Studios in Sydney, New South Wales.

Early Morning Wake Up Call peaked at No. 3 on the Swedish Topplistan chart, and No. 18 on the Swiss Hitparade. The album spawned two hit singles – the title track (No. 26 in Germany) and "Midnight Man", which charted in several countries, but again was the most successful in Germany, reaching No. 7.

== Critical reception ==
Cashbox magazine wrote "This latest collection from the Australian duo of Vanda & Young is a typical collage of novelty-effects synth pop which oozes melodic hooks and eclecticism. While many of the tunes recall classic rock cliches, Flash and the Pan always come up with a way of making them sound original. Distinctly orchestral pieces such as 'Barking At the Moon' and the energised 'Early Morning Wake-Up Call' are the highlights here on an album which will certainly arouse enthusiasm in new music circles."

== Track listing ==
Side one

1. "Early Morning Wake Up Call" – 4:06
2. "Communication Breakdown" – 3:27
3. "Barking at the Moon" – 3:59
4. "Downtown Too Long" – 4:20
5. "Opera Singers" – 4:51

Side two

6. "Midnight Man" – 4:56
7. "On the Road" – 5:06
8. "Look at That Woman Go" – 4:54
9. "Fat Night" – 3:57
10. "Believe in Yourself" – 4:19

2012 reissue bonus track

11. "Early Morning Wake Up Call" (instrumental version) – 4:36

== Charts ==
Weekly chart performance for Early Morning Wake Up Call
Chart (1984)	Peak position
Swedish Albums (Sverigetopplistan)	3
Swiss Albums (Schweizer Hitparade)	18
