= Hard Road (Stevie Wright album) =

Studio album by Stevie Wright
- Released: April 5, 1974
- Recorded: 1973
- Genres: Rock; hard rock
- Labels: Albert Productions (Australia); Polydor Records (UK & Europe); Atco (U.S.)
- Producers: George Young; Harry Vanda; Stevie Wright

Stevie Wright chronology
Hard Road (1974)	Black Eyed Bruiser (1975)

Singles from Hard Road
- 1. "Evie (Part 1)" Released: 1974; 2. "Hard Road/Guitar Band" Released: 1974

Alternative covers
- The Polydor Records release cover

Alternative cover
- The Atco Records release cover

Alternative cover
- The CD reissue cover and iTunes album artwork

Hard Road is the debut solo album from Australian singer Stevie Wright. The album's first single, "Evie (Part 1)", was hugely successful and the title track was later covered on Rod Stewart's 1974 album Smiler. The album itself reached #2 on the Australian album charts in 1974 and was the 16th-highest-selling album in Australia that year. The compact disc is currently out-of-print and has become quite rare. A digital edition was available on iTunes as of June, 2014.

== Background ==
In 1973, Harry Vanda and George Young returned to Australia after a period working in London paying off debts incurred while working as the Easybeats. They renewed their partnership with Albert Productions and as in-house producers began assembling a roster of artists for the label, among them their former Easybeats bandmate Stevie Wright.

Work soon commenced on an album with Wright, with Vanda and Young assembling a backing group that included themselves, pianist Warren Morgan of The Aztecs, and Malcolm Young, George's younger brother and the rhythm guitarist for AC/DC, on guitar. Wright wrote six songs for the album, while Vanda and Young wrote the remainder, including the title track and the three-part "Evie".

== Alternative covers ==
There are four different album covers for the album: The original Australian release, the Polydor release, the Atco release and the Australian compact disc reissue cover (which also serves as the artwork for the digital edition).

== Re-issued vinyl ==
Hard Road was scheduled to be re-released worldwide on high-quality, 180 g vinyl for maximum authenticity, April 19, 2014 through Albert Productions. Renowned mastering expert Don Bartley converted the original analogue tapes to new vinyl masters, on vintage and retooled analogue gear.

== Track listing ==
=== Side 1 ===
1. "Hard Road" (Harry Vanda - George Young) - 3:02
2. "Life Gets Better" (Stevie Wright) - 3:10
3. "The Other Side" (Stevie Wright) - 2:32
4. "I Got You Good" (Stevie Wright) - 3:16
5. "Dancing in the Limelight" (Stevie Wright) - 2:36
6. "Didn't I Take You Higher" (Harry Vanda, George Young) - 5:57

=== Side 2 ===
1. "Evie" - 11:01
  Part 1 (Let Your Hair Down) (Harry Vanda, George Young)
  Part 2 (Evie) (Harry Vanda, George Young)
  Part 3 (I'm Losing You) (Harry Vanda, George Young)
2. "Movin' On Up" (Stevie Wright) - 3:16
3. "Commando Line" (Stevie Wright) - 3:58

== Personnel ==
- Stevie Wright - vocals
- George Young - bass
- Harry Vanda - guitar
- Malcolm Young - guitar
- John Proud - drums
- Warren Morgan - piano

== Charts ==
=== Weekly charts ===
Chart (1974)	Peak position
Australia (Kent Music Report)	2

=== Year-end charts ===
Chart (1974)	Peak position
Australia (Kent Music Report)	16
