= Nights in France =

Studio album by Flash and the Pan
- Released: 1987
- Recorded: Albert Studios, Sydney, Australia.
- Genre: New wave
- Label: Albert Productions (Australia); Epic CBS/Sony(US)
- Producer: Harry Vanda, George Young

Flash and the Pan chronology
Early Morning Wake Up Call (1984)	Nights in France (1987)	Burning Up the Night (1992)

Singles from Nights In France
- 1. "Ayla" Released: 1987; 2. "Yesterday's Gone" Released: 1988; 3. "Money Don't Lie" Released: 1988

Nights in France is the fifth album by Australian group Flash and the Pan, released in 1987. Three singles were released from the album, "Ayla", "Money Don't Lie" and "Yesterday's Gone".

7" edits exist of all three singles. The 12" version of "Money Don't Lie" is longer than the single edit but simply an edit of the album version. "Ayla" was released in two extended versions available on 12" and CD singles - the "Disco Mix" and the "Outta Town Mix" (dub version). The 7" and CD single also featured a non-album b-side currently not available on any other release, "Your Love is Strange". "Yesterday's Gone" was also released as an extended version. All four extended versions are included on the 2012 double CD compilation The 12 Inch Mixes. The single edits of "Ayla" and "Money Don't Lie" have been included on several compilations including Collection and Ayla - The Best of Flash and the Pan. However, all CDs containing "Yesterday's Gone" opt for the album version.

"Ayla" was a sizable hit single in Germany (staying in the Top 100 for fifteen weeks and peaking at #26) and the Netherlands (#39).

== Track listing ==
All songs written by Harry Vanda and George Young.

Side A
No.	Title	Length
1.	"Money Don't Lie"	6:36
2.	"Nights in France"	4:30
3.	"Ayla"	5:40
4.	"Yesterday's Gone"	5:03

Side B
No.	Title	Length
1.	"Drawn by the Light"	5:01
2.	"Hard Livin'"	6:09
3.	"Saviour Man"	6:51
4.	"Bones"	5:16

== Personnel ==
=== Musicians ===
- Harry Vanda - lead guitar, vocals, keyboards
- George Young - lead vocals, keyboards, guitars
- Warren Morgan - keyboards
- Ronnie Peel - bass
- James Young - drums

*Unknown - saxophone on "Saviour Man"

=== Production ===
- Harry Vanda - Producer
- George Young - Producer
- Sam Horsburgh Jnr. - Engineer
