= Nothing Touches Me =

Studio album by British India
- Released: 13 March 2015
- Recorded: 2014–2015
- Studios: Sing Sing, Melbourne
- Genre: Indie rock
- Length: 44:26
- Label: Liberation
- Producer: Glenn Goldsmith

British India chronology
Controller (2013)	Nothing Touches Me (2015)

Singles from Nothing Touches Me
- 1. "Wrong Direction" Released: October 2014; 2. "Suddenly" Released: 2015

Nothing Touches Me is the fifth studio album by Australian rock band British India, released through Liberation Music on 13 March 2015. It debuted at number 5 on the ARIA charts, the group's fourth album in a row to reach the top 10.

== Background ==
Australian garage rock band, British India, released their fifth studio album, Nothing Touches Me in March 2015 via Liberation Music. The line-up was Will Drummond on bass guitar, Declan Melia on lead vocals and guitar, Matt O'Gorman on drums, and Nic Wilson on lead guitar. Although the band attempted to record it in Berlin in late 2014, the results were lacklustre. They returned to Sing Sing studios in Melbourne where it was produced by Glenn Goldsmith, again.

Nothing Touches Me debuted at number five on the Australian albums chart, their fourth album in a row to reach the top ten. It provided two singles, "Wrong Direction" (October 2014) and "Suddenly" (2015). The band toured in support of the album and headlined the main stage at the 2015 Byron Bay Bluesfest as a replacement for The Black Keys.

== Track listing ==
All tracks are written by Will Drummond, Declan Xavier Melia, Matthew Vincent O'Gorman, and Nicholas James Wilson.

No.	Title	Length
1.	"Spider Chords"	3:25
2.	"Angela"	3:32
3.	"Suddenly"	4:27
4.	"Wrong Direction"	3:47
5.	"Blame It All on Me"	3:42
6.	"Jay Walker"	3:30
7.	"Nothing Touches Me"	4:59
8.	"Come Home"	3:58
9.	"Lifeguard"	5:00
10.	"Right by Your Side"	3:04
11.	"This Is How It Feels"	3:53
12.	"Departure Lounge"	4:22

== Personnel ==
British India

- Will Drummond – bass guitar, backing vocals
- Declan Melia – lead vocals, guitar
- Matt O'Gorman – drums
- Nic Wilson – lead guitar

Artisans

- Glenn Goldsmith – producer
- Callum Barter – mixing engineer, recording engineer
- Aaron Dobos – recording engineer

== Charts ==
Chart (2015)	Peak position
Australian Albums (ARIA)	5
