= Jack Marx =

Australian journalist and author

Jackson Gregory Marx, known as Jack Marx, is an Australian journalist and author. He was born in Maitland, New South Wales.

== Career ==
Marx moved to Sydney in his late teens to pursue a career in music with the rock band I Spartacus (previously known as 'A Dog for Jonathon'), from Newcastle. By his own account, the band was less than successful, Marx becoming "the type of shocking wanker that today I can't stomach ... a guy who thought his destiny was to thrill the world on the rock and roll stage". When I Spartacus disbanded in 1990 – the dissolution due, in part, to Marx's own "spiral into drug and alcohol dependence" – Marx began writing reviews and articles for the Sydney street press and was soon employed by the Sydney Morning Herald and the Australian edition of Rolling Stone as a freelance music correspondent. He became notable for reviewing albums while openly admitting he had not listened to them, choosing instead to search the packaging and liner notes for "the tell-tale signs that you're in for an hour of crap".

In 1994, Marx worked as a reporter for the Melbourne tabloid newspaper Truth, before being employed by Australian Consolidated Press as a senior writer for men's titles such as The Picture and Ralph. In 1999, he became editor of Australian Style, causing controversy when he assigned accused anti-Semite author Helen Darville to interview British Holocaust denier David Irving.

In 2004, Marx won Best Feature Article at the Australian Business and Specialist Publication Awards for his investigation into the history of Henry Leighton Jones, the Australian doctor purported to have engaged in the transplantation of monkey glands into humans.

Marx was author of the Fairfax news blog The Daily Truth until he was dismissed on 20 August 2007, following his publication of a satirical piece on the Australian Labor Party leader, and former prime minister, Kevin Rudd's visit to a New York strip club.

Marx has written three non-fiction books to date: The Damage Done - Twelve Years of Hell in a Bangkok Prison (1997), which he co-authored with Warren Fellows; the controversial Sorry- the Wretched Tale of Little Stevie Wright (1999); and Australian Tragic (2009).

In 2012, Marx was nominated by Rolling Stone magazine as "Male of the Year", for his contribution to Australian literary culture.

== Stevie Wright biography ==
It was during his time as a music journalist that Marx went in search of his childhood rock and roll idol, Stevie Wright, of the Australian 1960s band, The Easybeats. He found Wright allegedly living as a drug-addicted recluse in a small coastal town in southern New South Wales and Wright's life story, along with Marx's near-disastrous attempts to extract it from him, was documented in Sorry: The Wretched Tale of Little Stevie Wright (1999). The book was critically applauded by many reviewers - Australian music historian Clinton Walker calling it "gonzo journalism at its best", while The Bulletin later referred to Sorry as "one of the most harrowing rock books ever written".

Nevertheless, Sorry earned the disdain of its subject, Wright's many fans and some critics, including Internet reviewer Ken Grady (Luna Cafe, 1999), who described Marx as "a self serving hypocrite" and concluded his review by observing: "The only thing that Marx has achieved is to depict himself as a very unlikeable, morally bankrupt leech."

== Russell Crowe's "stooge" ==
In 2005, Marx was approached by Oscar-winning actor Russell Crowe, who sought to employ Marx as a "guerilla publicist". Their six-month relationship ended badly and, in June 2006, Marx published an online account of the experience entitled "I Was Russell Crowe's Stooge". Though the ethically ambiguous piece instantly outraged many fans and media commentators, it made Australian media history by becoming the first story to leap from the digital arena to print, serialised over two days in both Fairfax broadsheets, The Sydney Morning Herald and The Age, and subsequently won Marx Australia's premier prize for journalism, the Walkley Award, for newspaper feature writing.
