= British India (band) =

Australian indie rock band

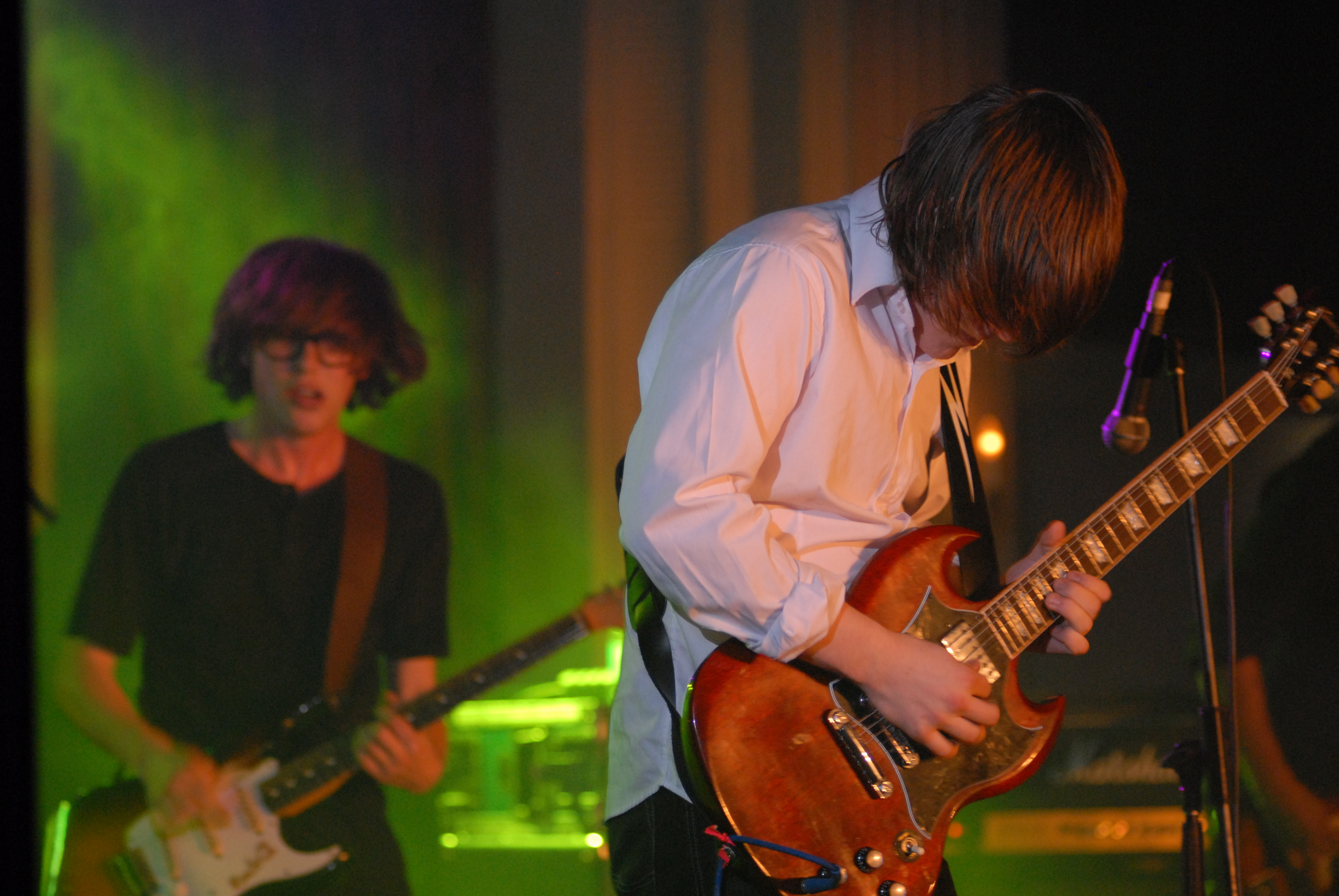
- British India performing in the Regal Ballroom at the High Vibes festival, Northcote, 23 September 2007

Background information
- Origin: Melbourne, Victoria, Australia
- Genres: Indie rock; garage rock
- Years active: 2004 – present
- Labels: Flashpoint Music; Shock Records; Liberation Music
- Members: Declan Melia; Will Drummond; Matt O'Gorman; Jack Tosi
- Past members: Nic Wilson

British India are an Australian indie rock band from Melbourne, Victoria. The original lineup consisted of lead vocalist and rhythm guitarist Declan Melia, lead guitarist Nic Wilson, bassist Will Drummond and drummer Matt O'Gorman. In 2019, guitarist Jack Tosi replaced Nic Wilson as a touring member of the band. British India have released six studio albums stretching over a 10-year period, with their latest release Forgetting the Future dating back to 2017.

== History ==
=== Formation and early years (2003–2006) ===
British India was formed when the group met at high school in 2003 at St. Bede's College, in Melbourne, Victoria. The band began rehearsing and writing songs in the pool room at drummer Matt O'Gorman's parents' house. Early influences included The Strokes, The White Stripes, The Datsuns, and Interpol. Upon finishing high school, the band began gigging extensively at pub and club shows throughout Melbourne.

In 2005, the band recorded a vinyl seven-inch single called "Outside 109" with producer Lindsay Gravina at his Birdland Studios. The single was given airplay on Triple J, and it generated some interest in the Australian music industry.

=== Counter Culture EP and Guillotine (2006–2007) ===
In 2005, the band met producer and future manager Glenn Goldsmith, who provided early demos to Australian producer Harry Vanda, Vanda agreed to finance and produce the band.

In late 2005, the band recorded the four-track Counter Culture EP at Vanda's Flashpoint Studios in Sydney with Vanda and Goldsmith as producers. Promoted with the single "The Time", the EP made little impact, producing no label interest or radio airplay.

In 2006, the band returned to Flashpoint to record their debut album Guillotine, again produced by Vanda and Goldsmith. After being shelved for several months due to lack of label interest, the album was eventually released independently through Flashpoint Music and Shock Records distribution.

Guillotine was released on 30 June 2007 and included the singles "Black & White Radio", "Tie Up My Hands" and "Run the Red Light". This was followed by a successful Australian tour and festival appearances at Homebake festival and The Big Day Out. Triple J played the album extensively, and "Tie Up My Hands" and "Run The Red Light" charted in the Triple J Hottest 100 of that year. Guillotine was nominated for the 2007 J Awards. British India won the Australian Independent Record (AIR) Award for Best New Artist.

=== Thieves (2008) ===
In 2007, British India continued to play shows and festivals whilst writing material for their second album. In April 2008 they began recording their second album Thieves, again with Harry Vanda and Glenn Goldsmith at Flashpoint Studios in Sydney. Thieves peaked at #5 in the ARIA Album Charts. The first single, "I Said I'm Sorry" reached number 23 in Triple J's Hottest 100 for 2008. Thieves was nominated for Best Independent Album at the 2008 ARIA awards.

=== Avalanche (2010) ===
In 2009, British India parted with Flashpoint Music and recorded their third album, Avalanche, independently throughout 2009. The album was recorded at Sing Sing studios Melbourne and produced by Glenn Goldsmith. Avalanche was released in March 2010 and promoted by the single "Vanilla". The album debuted in the top 10 and sold 20,000 copies. The album was followed by extensive touring and festival appearances.

In late 2010, Shock Records fell into receivership following the album release, and it was unable to pay the band unpaid royalties. Later that year, British India embarked on their first UK tour pursuing interest from Warner Music UK. The tour was successful, but an album deal with Warner did not eventuate.

The band returned from the UK to find their rehearsal space had flooded. At the end of 2010 the band were suffering from writer's block and financial hardship following Shock Records's receivership and the expensive UK tour.

=== Controller (2013) ===
In late 2010, British India released a stand-alone single "March into The Ocean" and embarked on the biggest Australian tour of their careers in early 2011.

Following the tour, they built a new rehearsal space and recording studio: Josif K studios in Preston, Melbourne. Now able to demo songs for the first time in their careers, they generated interest with Australian label Liberation Music who agreed to release their fourth album.

The band’s fourth album, Controller was recorded at Sing Sing Studios and produced by Glenn Goldsmith. The first single "I Can Make You Love Me" would later be certified Gold for selling 20,000 units and came in at number 37 in triple j's Hottest 100 of 2012. This was followed by the singles "Summer Forgive Me", and "Plastic Souvenirs".

The album was followed by extensive Australian touring including supporting The Rolling Stones on their 14 On Fire Tour.

=== Nothing Touches Me (2015) ===
In March 2015, the band released their fifth album Nothing Touches Me. Although the band attempted to record the album in Berlin in late 2014, the results were considered lacklustre, and the band returned to Sing Sing studios where the album was again produced by Glenn Goldsmith. Nothing Touches Me debuted at Number five on the Australian album charts and included the singles "Suddenly" and "Wrong Direction".

The band toured in support of the album and played the biggest venues of their career. The tour was a success with all shows selling out. The success of Nothing Touches Me was encapsulated when British India headlined the main stage at the 2015 Byron Bay Bluesfest as a replacement for The Black Keys.

=== Forgetting the Future (2017) ===
In 2017, the band left Josif K studios and relocated to Sing Sing South recording studio in Melbourne to begin working on songs for their sixth album. Wanting to record with a new producer, they teamed up with Oscar Dawson of Holy Holy. Their sixth album Forgetting the Future was released in October 2017 and was promoted with the singles "Precious" and "My Love".

Following the tour promoting Forgetting the Future, founding member Nic Wilson announced that he would no longer tour with the band. In 2019,the remaining members recruited Jack Tosi of Stealing O'Neil to replace Nic on guitar. The band embarked on a successful Australian tour in August 2019.

== Discography ==
=== Studio albums ===
List of studio albums with release details and selected chart positions shown
| Title | Album details | Peak chart positions |
| Title | Album details | AUS |
|---|---|---|
| Guillotine | Released: November 2007; Label: Flashpoint Music (BI002); Formats: CD, digital download | 55 |
| Thieves | Released: 19 July 2008; Label: Flashpoint (BI004); Formats: CD, digital download | 5 |
| Avalanche | Released: 30 April 2010; Label: Flashpoint (ID002); Formats: CD, digital download | 10 |
| Controller | Released: 22 March 2013; Label: Liberation Music (LMCD0223); Formats: CD, digital download, LP | 10 |
| Nothing Touches Me | Released: 13 March 2015; Label: Liberation (LMCD0269); Formats: CD, digital download, LP, streaming | 5 |
| Forgetting the Future | Released: 22 September 2017; Label: Liberation (LMCD0335); Formats: CD, digital download, LP, streaming | 12 |

=== EPs ===
List of EPs with release details shown
| Title | Album details | Peak chart positions |
| Title | Album details | AUS |
|---|---|---|
| Counter Culture | Released: November 2005; Label: Flashpoint Music (BI001); Formats: CD | — |

=== Singles ===
List of singles with selected chart positions
| Year | Title | Peak chart positions | Certifications | Album |
| Year | Title | AUS | Certifications | Album |
|---|---|---|---|---|
| 2005 | "Outside 109 / Automatic Blitzkrieg" | - | | |
| 2006 | "Black & White Radio" | - | | Guillotine |
| 2007 | "Tie Up My Hands" | - | | Guillotine |
| 2007 | "Run the Red Light" | 50 | | Guillotine |
| 2008 | "I Said I'm Sorry" | - | | Thieves |
| 2009 | "God Is Dead, Meet the Kids" | - | | Thieves |
| 2009 | "Vanilla" | - | | Avalanche |
| 2010 | "Beneath the Satellites" | - | | Avalanche |
| 2010 | "Avalanche" | - | | Avalanche |
| 2011 | "March into the Ocean" | - | | non-album single |
| 2012 | "I Can Make You Love Me" | 70 | ARIA: Platinum | Controller |
| 2013 | "Summer Forgive Me" | - | | Controller |
| 2013 | "Plastic Souvenirs" | - | | Controller |
| 2013 | "Blinded" | - | | Controller |
| 2014 | "Wrong Direction" | - | | Nothing Touches Me |
| 2015 | "Suddenly" | - | ARIA: Gold | Nothing Touches Me |
| 2016 | "I Thought We Knew Each Other" | - | | non-album single |
| 2017 | "Precious" | - | | |
| 2018 | "My Love" | - | | |

=== Compilation appearances ===
- Discoveries (2007) – "Black & White Radio"
- Triple J Hottest 100 Vol.15 (2007) – "Tie Up My Hands"
- Triple J's Like a Version 4 (2008) – "And I Was a Boy from School"

== Awards ==
=== AIR awards ===
The Australian Independent Record Awards is an annual awards night to recognise, promote and celebrate the success of Australia's Independent Music sector.

| Year | Nominee / work | Award | Result |
|---|---|---|---|
| 2007 | themselves | Most Outstanding New Independent Artist | Won |
| 2008 | Thieves | Best Independent Album | Nominated |
| 2010 | themselves | Best Independent Artist | Nominated |
| 2015 | Nothing Touches Me | Best Independent Hard Rock or Punk Album | Nominated |

=== ARIA Music Awards ===
The ARIA Music Awards is an annual awards ceremony that recognises excellence, innovation, and achievement across all genres of Australian music.

| Year | Nominee / work | Award | Result |
|---|---|---|---|
| 2008 | Thieves | Best Independent Release | Nominated |
| 2008 | Harry Vanda and Glenn Goldsmith for Thieves | Producer of the Year | Nominated |

=== J Awards ===
The J Awards are an annual series of Australian music awards that were established by the Australian Broadcasting Corporation's youth-focused radio station Triple J. They commenced in 2005.

| Year | Nominee / work | Award | Result |
|---|---|---|---|
| 2007 | Guillotine | Australian Album of the Year | Nominated |
