= Black & White Radio =

Single by British India

from the album Guillotine
- Released: 2006
- Recorded: at Flashpoint Studios, 2006
- Genre: Alternative rock
- Length: 2:37
- Label: Shock, Flashpoint
- Songwriter(s): British India (Declan Melia, Nic Wilson, Will Drummond and Matt O'Gorman)
- Producer(s): Harry Vanda and Glenn Goldsmith

British India singles chronology
| "Outside 109" (2005) | "Black & White Radio" (2006) | "Tie Up My Hands" (2007) |

"Black & White Radio" is a single by Australian rock group British India, taken from their debut album Guillotine.

== Track listing ==
All tracks are written by British India

Single
| No. | Title | Length |
|---|---|---|
| 1. | "Black & White Radio" | 2:37 |

== Release history ==
| Region | Date | Label | Format | Catalogue |
|---|---|---|---|---|
| Australia | 2006 | Shock, Flashpoint | Digital download | - |
