= Evie (song) =

1974 single by Stevie Wright

Single by Stevie Wright

from the album Hard Road
- A-side: "Evie" (part 1)
- B-side: "Evie" (part 2 and 3)
- Released: April 1974
- Recorded: 1973
- Genre: Rock
- Length: 11:11
- Label: Albert
- Songwriters: Harry Vanda, George Young
- Producers: Harry Vanda, George Young

Stevie Wright singles chronology
"Hard Road" (1974)	"Evie" (1974)	"Guitar Band" (1974)

"Evie" is a rock song performed by Australian singer and former frontman of the Easybeats, Stevie Wright. It was written by Harry Vanda and George Young and released as a single in 1974. It has been suggested that it is the first 11-minute song to chart at number one anywhere in the world. According to author Mark Juddery, the song was "the longest Australian single ever to make the charts."

The song features three parts—Part 1, "Let your hair hang down"; Part 2, "Evie"; and Part 3, "I'm losing you"—and some critics consider it as one of the most perfect rock n' roll songs ever.

Part One (when they meet) is a guitar driven, hard rocking and bluesy, swaggering and swayful song. Part Two (the marriage) is more piano and string based, a much softer emotional ballad style. Part Three (the death of Evie in childbirth) is more of a disco-rock style, being quicker, relatively urgent and guitar driven track with a strong vocal.

In January 2018, as part of Triple M's "Ozzest 100", the 'most Australian' songs of all time, "Evie" was ranked number 17.

== Background ==
In 1973, Vanda & Young returned to Australia from the UK. Stevie Wright had found life difficult since the Easybeats disbanded and had developed a heroin addiction.

"Stevie was still a great performer, still a great singer," George Young says. "So Harry and I got to work to see if we could come up with something that could put him back in the charts."

Vanda and Young signed Stevie Wright and began working on the Hard Road album together.

The song features Malcolm Young of AC/DC on guitar. Young plays the guitar solo in Part One, while the solo in Part Three is played by Harry Vanda.

== Reception ==
The song was released in April 1974. The single version was divided across the A and B sides and peaked nationally during July. It remained in the charts for 26 weeks, the biggest Australian single of the year and the only pop song over six minutes to reach No 1. In 2025, the song ranked 96 on the Triple J Hottest 100 of Australian Songs.

=== Performances ===
In June 1974, Stevie Wright performed the song at Sydney Opera House in front of 2,500 people, with over 10,000 having been turned away. For this performance Wright's band included Harry Vanda, George Young and Malcolm Young. This was the first time that Wright, Vanda and George Young had appeared together after the breakup of the Easybeats five years previously.

On 4 November 1979, Wright took part in the "Concert of the Decade". He performed the song on the steps of the Opera House in front of 100,000 people.

Wright also performed the song during the 2002 Long Way to the Top tour.

== Personnel ==
- Stevie Wright – vocals
- George Young – bass
- Harry Vanda – lead guitar
- Malcolm Young – rhythm guitar
- John Proud – drums
- Tony Currenti – drums (part 3 only)
- Warren Morgan – piano, Hammond organ
- Richard Dakin – piano
- Paul Bagshaw – strings

== Charts ==
=== Weekly charts ===
Weekly chart performance for "Evie"
Chart (1974)	Peak position
Australia (Kent Music Report)	1

=== Year-end charts ===
Year-end chart performance for "Evie"
Chart (1974)	Position
Australia (Kent Music Report)	3

== The Wrights version ==
"Evie"

Single by the Wrights
- Released: 28 February 2005
- Recorded: 2004
- Length: 11:18
- Label: Flashpoint, EMI
- Songwriters: Harry Vanda, George Young
- Producers: Harry Vanda, Glenn Goldsmith

Australian supergroup the Wrights recorded a cover version of the song and released it as a single on 28 February 2005. It debuted at its peak of number two on the Australian ARIA Singles Chart in March 2005 and spent 14 weeks in the top 50. It was certified gold by the ARIA and was Australia's 47th-most-successful song of 2005.

=== Track listing ===
CD single

1. "Evie (Part I (Let Your Hair Hang Down))" – 3:48
2. "Evie (Part II (Evie))" – 3:27
3. "Evie (Part III (I'm Losing You))" – 4:03

=== Charts ===
Weekly chart performance for "Evie" by the Wrights
Chart (2005)	Peak position
Australia (ARIA)	2

Year-end chart performance for "Evie" by the Wrights
Chart (2005)	Position
Australia (ARIA)	47

=== Certifications ===
Certifications for "Evie" by the Wrights
Region	Certification	Certified units/sales
Australia (ARIA)	Gold	35,000^{^}
^{^} Shipments figures based on certification alone.

== Other cover version ==
Suzi Quatro recorded a cover version of part one that appeared on the European version of her album If You Knew Suzi... in 1978.
