= Flash and the Pan =

Australian new wave musical group

- Origin: Sydney, Australia
- Genres: New wave; pop rock; synth-pop
- Years active: 1976–1993
- Labels: Albert; Mercury; Ensign; Epic
- Spinoff of: Vanda & Young; Marcus Hook Roll Band
- Past members: Harry Vanda; George Young

Flash and the Pan were an Australian new wave musical group (essentially a studio project). Also described as "a kind of post-disco, pre-house percussive dance music". It was formed in 1976 by Harry Vanda and George Young, both former members of the Easybeats, who formed a production and songwriting team known as Vanda & Young. The group's first chart success was their 1976 debut single, "Hey, St. Peter", which reached number five in the Australian Kent Music Report Singles Chart. The next single, "Down Among the Dead Men", peaked at number four in Australia in 1978. For international release, it was re-titled "And the Band Played On".

The eponymous debut album followed in December 1978, featuring the track "Walking in the Rain", originally the B-side to "Hey St. Peter". The song was later covered by Grace Jones, and released as the last single from her 1981 album Nightclubbing. Her version was most successful in New Zealand, reaching number 34. Flash and the Pan's second album, Lights in the Night, released in early 1980, peaked at No. 1 on the Swedish Albums Chart. "Waiting for a Train", the lead single from their third album, Headlines, reached number seven on the UK singles chart in 1983.

== History ==
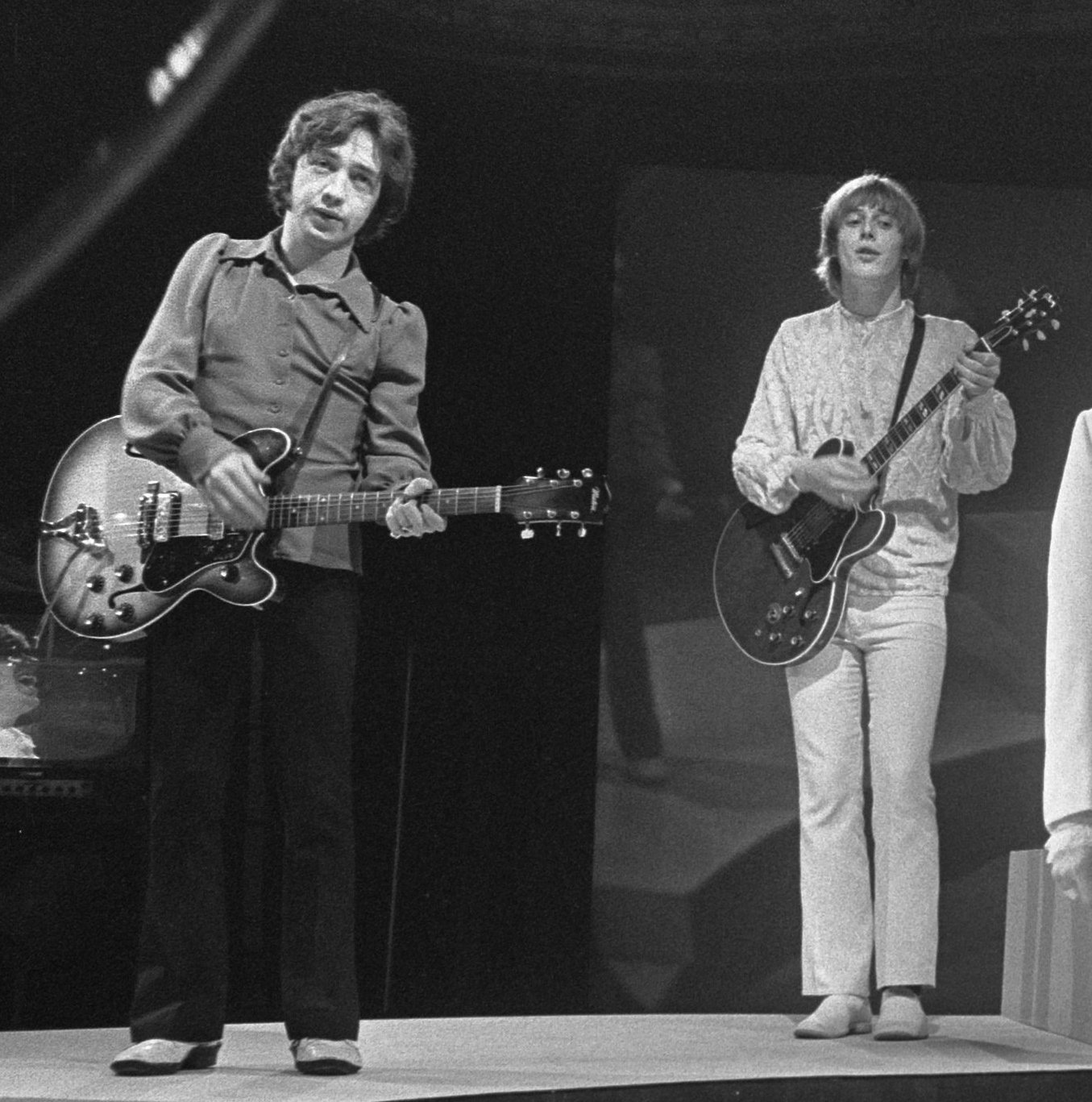
George Young (left) and Harry Vanda in 1968, performing with the Easybeats

Flash and the Pan was formed by Harry Vanda and George Young in mid-1976 in Sydney, Australia. It was initially a studio-only pop rock band, with both members on guitar, keyboards and vocals. The duo had been the key creative members of the Easybeats, and subsequently worked, both in Australia and in the United Kingdom (UK), as the songwriting and producing team, Vanda & Young. From mid-1973, they were A&R agents for Albert Productions, and its in-house producers at Albert Studios in Sydney.

It all began with an unfinished Easybeats London demo. Ted Albert was keen for them to use it but it did not suit any of the artists they were working with, namely Stevie Wright, John Paul Young or William Shakespeare. So they ended up doing it themselves. The name came from an off-the-cuff remark of Harry's that this would just be a flash in the pan thing.

Flash and the Pan's debut single, "Hey, St. Peter", which they had co-written and co-produced, was issued in September 1976 on Albert Productions "as an engaging diversion from the real job of record production for other artists." It peaked at No.5 on the Kent Music Report Singles Chart in February 1977. Australian musicologist Ian McFarlane felt "[t]he music was based around an accessible, yet inventive synthesiser-based pop rock sound with an emphasis on George's spoken-word vocals and shouted chorus."

John Paul Young (no relation), speaking to Kathy McCabe of News Corp Australia, remembered the story of the song: "George was in New York chatting to the hotel doorman about the weather and the African American guy says 'Oh well, man, when my time comes, I am going to say to St Peter "You can't send me to hell, I have done my time in hell in New York!'" George just picked up things you and I would say and turn them into songs." John Paul Young had hit singles written and produced by Vanda & Young, including "Yesterday's Hero" (1975) and "Love Is in the Air" (1977).

"Hey, St. Peter" was released in July 1977 on Mercury Records for continental Europe, where it reached No.6 on the Belgian Ultratop 50 Singles chart and No.7 on the Netherlands' Dutch Top 40. In the United Kingdom, it appeared on the Ensign Records label, and for the North American market it was issued in July 1979 on Epic Records, peaking at No.76 on the Billboard Hot 100 in August of that year. Their second single, "Down Among the Dead Men", was issued in Australia in July 1978, and peaked at No.4 on the Kent Music Report. On the UK Singles Chart, re-titled "And the Band Played On", it reached No.54. In November, they followed with their third single, "The African Shuffle".

The group's debut album, Flash and the Pan, was issued in Australia on Albert Productions in December 1978, and internationally in the following year on Mercury, Ensign and Epic. It was recorded at Albert Studios in Sydney, co-produced by the duo, who co-wrote nine of its ten tracks. The only song not written by them was "California" credited to M. James. Songwriters would often register songs under false names due to contractual issues. Vanda confirms that the author of this song was actually George's brother Alex Young, "I really liked Alex. He was very much his own man. He wrote 'California' and I thought that song was perfect for Flash and the Pan."

Aside from Vanda and Young, the studio musicians included Ray Arnott on drums, Les Karski on bass guitar and Warren Morgan on piano. Vanda & Young signed Arnott to Alberts with a recording contract and Karski produced Arnott's solo debut album, Rude Dudes in 1979, as well as providing bass guitar. The Ray Arnott Band, which included both Karski and Morgan, toured to support the album.

Although Flash and the Pan appeared on various national charts, including reaching No.14 on Sweden's Swedish Albums Chart and No.80 on the US Billboard 200, the duo did not support its release with a tour. As McFarlane said: "[they] preferred the sanctity of their 24-track Albert Studio enclave". AllMusic's Steven McDonald rated the album as four-and-a-half stars out of five and explained that it had "some seriously deranged songwriting, with quirky but attention-grabbing music peppered with pointy, strange lyrics. A soundtrack for the dark side of the moon that's well worth searching out."

For the group's second studio album, Lights in the Night (early 1980), Vanda and Young again used Arnott, Karski and Morgan. All eight tracks were co-written by Vanda and Young, who also co-produced the album. The album reached the top 100 in Australia, and peaked at No.1 on the Swedish Albums Chart in June. It provided two singles, "Welcome to the Universe" (July 1980) and "Media Man" (December 1980).

In October 1981, UK-based artist Grace Jones released her cover version of "Walking in the Rain", the B-side of "Hey, St. Peter", as a single, which peaked at No.34 in New Zealand. Dmetri Kakmi provided Stereo Stories with his recollection of first hearing it: "I was transported. Vanda and Young's lyrics and Jones's detached delivery captured the restlessness, alienation and pent-up emotions of a stifled adolescence... By the end of the track I was liberated, lifted out of a traditional Greek upbringing and pointed toward a future filled with wide horizons."

Headlines, their third studio album, appeared in August 1982. The liner notes on the first pressing of the album suggest that the members of Flash and the Pan are: Stevie Wright, Harry Vanda, George Young, Les Karski (bass) and Ian Miller (guitar). Additional players on the album are listed as: Ray Arnott (drums); Johnny Dick (drums), Alan Sandow (drums); Lyndsay Hammond (backing vocals on loan from Cheetah); Ralph White (brass instruments and keyboards). The shots of the band on the album cover show Stevie Wright at the mic and George Young on drums. The truth of the matter is that there was a plan to put together some sort of band headed by Wright to tour as Flash and the Pan so that Harry and George could stay at home. However due to Wright's addiction issues, it never eventuated. Nor did Wright perform on the album. Later pressings removed Wright's name from the credits.

McFarlane felt that Headlines "featured a more basic rock approach, but with no loss of power or originality." Headlines reached No.13 on the Swedish Albums Chart.

Hammond's group, Cheetah, was signed to Alberts in 1978 by Vanda & Young. Arnott, Karski and Miller were all members of Cheetah during 1982, alongside Hammond and her sister, Chrissie. Wright was the duo's bandmate from the Easybeats, and they had written and produced material for his solo career, including his number one hit "Evie" (April 1974).

"Waiting for a Train" reached the top 100 in Australia, but had greater chart success in Europe when issued there in April 1983: it peaked at No.7 in the UK, No.15 in Belgium and No.26 in the Netherlands. According to Duncan Kimball of MilesAgo, it is "a song with definite drug overtones that could well have been written about Stevie's predicament."

Late in 1984, they issued their fourth studio album, Early Morning Wake Up Call which, according to Neil Lade of The Canberra Times, showed that the duo were "content to rest on their laurels... they have lapsed into the world of 'gimmick' songs... [and] an exercise of the bland and boring... Trite lyrics are made even more limp by droning vocal work." The single "Midnight Man" became a cult underground dance hit in Ibiza. It was mixed by renowned DJs and producers Francois Kevorkian and Ron St Germain. Swedish rock band The Hives have been known to regularly perform the title track.

Their next studio album, Nights in France, appeared in October 1987 via Epic Records. It provided two singles, "Ayla", in September, and "Money Don't Lie" in April 1988. "Ayla" features in a party scene of the 2005 French movie Combien Tu M'Aimes featuring Monica Belluci and Gerard Depardieu. Their final studio album, Burning up the Night, was issued in October 1992, with two further singles, "Burning up the Night" (October) and "Living on Dreams" (March 1993). Thereafter, the duo concentrated on their songwriting and production work for other artists.

Despite the success of the band's studio albums Flash and the Pan never performed live. Harry Vanda explained, "It was entirely our own fault. We put in no promotion whatsoever. They tried to get us to get a band together and go to the States promoting it - things we would advise any band to do... but we had no time to do that, nor did we have the inclination, so therefore as a result, it is quite amazing that it did take off so nicely."

== Discography ==
=== Studio albums ===
Year	Title	Details	Peak chart positions					
Year	Title	Details	AUS	CAN	GER	SWE	SWI	US
1978	Flash and the Pan	Released: December 1978; Label: Albert Productions	94	25	—	14	—	80
1980	Lights in the Night	Released: 1980; Label: Albert Productions	78	—	—	1	—	—
1982	Headlines	Released: August 1982; Label: Albert Productions	—	47	—	13	—	—
1984	Early Morning Wake Up Call	Released: 1984; Label: Albert Productions	—	—	—	3	18	—
1987	Nights in France	Released: October 1987; Label: Albert Productions	—	—	—	—	—	—
1992	Burning Up the Night	Released: October 1992; Label: Albert Productions	—	—	92	—	—	—
"—" denotes releases that did not chart or were not released

=== Compilations ===
- Pan-orama (July 1983) Easy Beat (EASLP 100) – UK No. 69.
- Flash Hits (1988) Cha Cha (001-1)
- Collection (1990)
- The Flash and the Pan Hits Collection (1996) Albert Productions / Epic Records (477106 2 / EPC 466950 2)
- Ayla The Best of Flash and the Pan (2005) Repertoire Records

=== Singles ===
Year	Single	Peak chart positions													
Year	Single	AUS	BEL (FLA)	BEL (WA)	CAN	FIN	GER	IRE	NL	NZ	SA	SWE	SWI	UK	US
1976	"Hey, St. Peter" (b/w "Walking in the Rain")	5	6	20	77	—	—	—	7	—	—	—	—	—	76
1978	"Down Among the Dead Men" (aka "And the Band Played On")	4	—	—	—	—	—	—	—	—	19	—	—	54	—
1978	"The African Shuffle"	85	—	—	—	—	—	—	—	—	—	—	—	—	—
1979	"Man in the Middle" (Canada-only release)	—	—	—	—	—	—	—	—	—	—	—	—	—	—
1979	"California" (UK-only release)	—	—	—	—	—	—	—	—	—	—	—	—	—	—
1980	"Welcome to the Universe"	—	—	—	—	—	—	—	—	—	—	—	—	—	—
1980	"Media Man"	—	—	—	—	—	—	—	—	—	—	—	—	—	—
1980	"Atlantis Calling" (Sweden-only release)	—	—	—	—	—	—	—	—	—	—	—	—	—	—
1982	"Love is a Gun" (Sweden-only release)	—	—	—	—	—	—	—	—	—	—	—	—	—	—
1982	"Where Were You"	—	—	—	—	—	—	—	—	—	—	—	—	—	—
1982	"Waiting for a Train"	98	15	—	—	—	—	11	26	26	—	—	—	7	—
1983	"Waiting for a Train (French Take)"	66	—	—	—	—	—	—	—	—	—	—	—	—	—
1983	"Down Among the Dead Men" (reissue)	—	—	—	—	—	—	—	—	—	—	—	—	77	—
1984	"Midnight Man"	66	33	—	—	27	7	—	23	—	29	20	16	—	—
1985	"Early Morning Wake Up Call"	—	—	—	—	—	26	—	—	—	—	—	—	—	—
1987	"Ayla"	—	—	—	—	—	26	—	39	—	—	—	—	—	—
1988	"Money Don't Lie"	—	—	—	—	—	—	—	—	—	—	—	—	—	—
1988	"Yesterday's Gone"	—	—	—	—	—	—	—	—	—	—	—	—	—	—
1989	"Waiting for a Train '89" (UK-only release)	—	—	—	—	—	—	—	—	—	—	—	—	—	—
1990	"Something About You"	—	—	—	—	—	—	—	—	—	—	—	—	—	—
1992	"Burning Up the Night"	178	—	—	—	—	—	—	—	—	—	—	—	—	—
1993	"Living on Dreams" (Australia-only release)	200	—	—	—	—	—	—	—	—	—	—	—	—	—
1995	"Hey St. Peter"	152	—	—	—	—	—	—	—	—	—	—	—	—	—
1996	"Walking in the Rain '96"	—	—	—	—	—	—	—	—	—	—	—	—	—	—
1996	"Waiting for a Train '96" (Australia-only release)	—	—	—	—	—	—	—	—	—	—	—	—	—	—
"—" denotes releases that did not chart or were not released
