= Headlines (Flash and the Pan album) =

Studio album by Flash and the Pan
- Released: August 1982
- Genre: Synthpop
- Label: Albert Productions (Australia, New Zealand); Ensign (Europe); Epic (US, Canada)
- Producer: Harry Vanda, George Young

Flash and the Pan chronology
Lights in the Night (1980)	Headlines (1982)	Early Morning Wake Up Call (1984)

Singles from Headlines
- 1. "Love Is a Gun" Released: 1982; 2. "Where Were You" Released: September 1982; 3. "Waiting for a Train" Released: 9 May 1983

Professional ratings
Review scores
Source	Rating
AllMusic	3/5 stars

Headlines is the third album by Australian band Flash and the Pan, released in 1982. It includes the UK hit single "Waiting for a Train" which reached No. 7 in the charts in June 1983. At this time, Stevie Wright was officially a member of Flash and the Pan, making this version of the group close to an Easybeats revival; however, there is some doubt about how much Wright actually contributed to the recordings. He appears in the video to the song 'Where Were You' miming to George Young's voice.

== Track listing ==
All tracks are written by Harry Vanda & George Young

No.	Title	Length
1.	"Jetsetters Ball"	4:49
2.	"Don't Vote"	2:48
3.	"Waiting for a Train"	4:42
4.	"War Games"	4:20
5.	"Where Were You"	3:21
6.	"Love Is a Gun"	3:30
7.	"Up Against the Wall"	5:15
8.	"Psychos on the Street"	3:54
9.	"Hey Jimmy"	3:15
10.	"Phil the Creole"	4:05

2012 Remaster bonus tracks
No.	Title	Length
11.	"Waiting for a Train [French Take/Single Version]"	3:42
12.	"Something About You [Nostalgic Mix 1983]" (original version)	3:25
13.	"Something About You [1990 Version]"	3:27

== Personnel ==
- Harry Vanda - lead guitar, vocals
- George Young - lead vocals, keyboards, rhythm guitar
- Les Karski - bass
- Ray Arnott - drums, vocals
- Chrissie and Lyndsay Hammond - backing vocals
- Harry Vanda & George Young - producers
- Sam Horsburgh, Jr. - engineer
- Colin Freeman - mix-down engineer
- Björn Almstedt - mastering
- Paul Janiszewski - cover artwork/concept
- Stevie Wright - vocals
