= Thieves (album) =

Studio album by British India
- Released: 19 July 2008
- Recorded: Flashpoint Studios, Sydney 2008
- Genre: Indie rock
- Length: 37:01
- Label: Shock; Flashpoint
- Producer: Harry Vanda; Glenn Goldsmith

British India chronology
Guillotine (2007)	Thieves (2008)	Avalanche (2010)

Singles from Thieves
- 1. "I Said I'm Sorry" Released: 24 June 2008; 2. "God Is Dead, Meet the Kids" Released: 17 February 2009

Thieves is the second studio album by Australian indie rock band British India, released on 19 July 2008, but also sold early by the band at album launch parties. The album was co-produced by Harry Vanda and Glenn Goldsmith. It peaked at No. 5 on the ARIA Albums Chart.

Thieves was selected as Triple J's Feature Album in that month, beating both The Vines' album Melodia and The Living End's album White Noise. At the ARIA Music Awards of 2008 it was nominated for Best Independent Release.

== Track listing ==
All tracks are written by Will Drummond, Declan Melia, Matt O'Gorman and Nic Wilson

Thieves
No.	Title	Length
1.	"God Is Dead (Meet the Kids)"	3:39
2.	"This Dance Is Loaded"	3:10
3.	"I Said I'm Sorry"	3:36
4.	"Put It Right Down"	3:04
5.	"Funeral for a Trend"	4:00
6.	"Airport Tags"	4:05
7.	"You Will Die and I Will Take Over"	3:40
8.	"Mona Lisa Overdrive"	3:54
9.	"Nic the Poet"	3:02
10.	"The Golden Years"	4:59

Some tracks are titled slightly differently inside the booklet compared with the back inlay. For instance, "You Will Die and I Will Take Over" is listed as "You Will Die, I Will Take Over" and "The Golden Years" is listed as "The Golden Years (Angel Complication)" and on iTunes "God Is Dead (Meet the Kids)" is listed as "God Is Dead, Meet the Kids".

== Personnel ==
- Will Drummond – bass guitar
- Declan Melia – vocals, guitar
- Matt O’Gorman – drums
- Nic Wilson – guitar

== Charts ==
Chart (2008)	Peak position
Australian ARIA Albums Chart	5

== Release history ==
Region	Date	Label	Format	Catalogue
Australia	19 July 2008	Shock, Flashpoint	CD, Digital download	BI004
