= Controller (British India album) =

Studio album by British India
- Released: 22 March 2013
- Genre: Indie rock
- Length: 44:26
- Label: Liberation Music

British India chronology
Avalanche (2010)	Controller (2013)	Nothing Touches Me (2015)

Singles from Controller
- 1. "I Can Make You Love Me" Released: 23 July 2012; 2. "Summer Forgive Me"; 3. "Blinded"

Controller is the fourth studio album by the Australian rock band British India, released through Liberation Music on 22 March 2013.

== Promotion and release ==
Controller is the Melbourne group's first album since signing to their first label, Liberation Music. This album also saw the group sign with Mushroom Publishing.

The album debuted at number 10 on the ARIA charts, the group's third album in a row to debut in the ARIA top 10.

== Reception ==
Professional ratings
Review scores
Source	Rating
The Brag	3.5/5 stars
FasterLouder	7/10 stars
Rip It Up	4/5 stars

Controller was largely well received, gaining positive reviews from a range of media sources. One critic commented that they focused on "reclaiming the power and intensity that was lacking on their last record".

== Track listing ==
All tracks are written by British India

No.	Title	Length
1.	"Plastic Souvenirs"	3:57
2.	"Blinded"	4:24
3.	"Summer Forgive Me"	3:57
4.	"I Can Make You Love Me"	4:26
5.	"We Don't Need Anyone"	4:29
6.	"Twice Inna Lifetime"	3:35
7.	"Your Brand New Life"	3:44
8.	"Swimming In Winter"	3:42
9.	"Another Christmas In The Trenches"	2:45
10.	"Crystals"	5:23

== Personnel ==
British India

- Declan Melia – lead vocals
- Will Drummond – bass, backing vocals
- Nic Wilson – lead guitar
- Matt O'Gorman – drums

== Charts ==
Chart (2013)	Peak position
Australian Albums (ARIA)	10
