= Ray Hoff =

- Born: Raymond Terrence Charles Hough; 29 December 1942; Sydney, New South Wales, Australia
- Died: 19 March 2010 (aged 67) Sydney, New South Wales, Australia
- Genres: Rock 'n' roll; R&B
- Occupation: Musician
- Instrument: Vocals
- Years active: 1958–1975
- Label: Clarion
- Formerly of: Ray Hoff & the Off Beats; Likefun; Ray Hoff & his Combo

Raymond Terrence Charles Hough (born 29 December 1942), who performed as Ray Hoff, was an Australian rock 'n' roll and R&B singer from the late 1950s to mid-1970s. He led Ray Hoff & the Off Beats from 1959 to 1967, which issued a self-titled album. During the early 1970s he was a member of Perth-based blues revival group, Likefun. After his music career he became an auto detailer. In 2005 he was diagnosed with cancer, subsequently he had two strokes and died on 19 March 2010, aged 67.

== Biography ==
Ray Hoff (born Raymond Terrence Charles Hough, 29 December 1942) was the sixth child of Margaret and William "Sydney" Hough (born c. 1900). Sydney had died on 3 December 1942, weeks before Hoff was born. Hoff grew up in Sydney's Enfield. In 1958, as a vocalist, he teamed with Leon Isackson on drums and Jimmy Taylor on piano to perform at the Leichhardt Police Citizens Boys Club. He formed the first line-up of Ray Hoff & the Off Beats in 1959 with Isackson and Taylor joined by John Ryan on bass guitar and Darby Wilson on guitar.

The Off Beats had a variable line-up, John Ryan's brother Vince provided saxophone in the early years. In 1964 the group released a single, "Little Queenie", via RCA, which is a cover version of Chuck Berry's 1959 track. It reached the No 3 on the top 40 on the local Sydney pop charts. His final line-up in that city was Taylor with Mike Downes on rhythm guitar and Col Risby on lead guitar; all three left to join Billy Thorpe and the Aztecs in 1965.

Hoff relocated to Adelaide and then to Perth. There he formed a new line-up of the Off Beats with Graham Bartlett on guitar, Robert Blom on saxophone, David Birkbeck on trumpet, Ken McBarron on saxophone, Warwick Findlay on drums, John Gray on bass guitar and Basil V'Delli on keyboards. The group signed with Clarion Records, which issued two singles, "Let's Go, Let's Go, Let's Go" (May 1966) and "Tossin' and Turnin'" (October). The group's debut self-titled studio album also appeared in that year via Clarion and was distributed by Festival Records.

Australian musicologist, Ian McFarlane, described how, "[it] featured one side of live cuts and one side of studio material. Among obligatory covers of 'Got My Mojo Working', 'In the Midnight Hour' and 'Mercy Mercy' was the wild instrumental 'My Good Friend Mary Jane'." The group disbanded in 1967, McFarlane felt "The band's style of rock'n'roll was raw with a strong R&B; base. The band made little headway, despite several years of slogging around the Sydney dance/discotheque circuit."

Hoff formed a briefly existing blues duo with Andre De Moller (ex-Blue Dogs). Malcolm J Turnbull of the Australian Folklore Unit observed, "both veterans of the rock scene, teamed up to cater for hard-core blues fans, and played to packed Thursday night houses at the Quitapena before trying their luck in the east." By 1971 Hoff had joined the Likefun, "an ambitious rock'n'roll revue band", in Perth. Other members were Morri Pierson on vocals, Shirley Reid on vocals, John Tucak on bass guitar, Alan Wilkes on organ and Stevie Wright on vocals (ex-the Easybeats).

Hoff became "one of the most active Australian performers in Vietnam during the war", where he met his future wife, Kay Kirby, who was a go-go dancer. He returned to Sydney where he left, "full-time performance and became successful in automotive detailing." He was diagnosed with cancer in 2005 and subsequently had two strokes; Ray Hoff died on 19 March 2010, aged 67.

== Discography ==
Credits:

=== Albums ===
- Ray Hoff & the Off Beats (1966) Clarion Records/Festival Records (MCL 32116)
- Let's Go: the Festival File (compilation album, 1988) Festival Records.

=== Extended plays ===
- Its Ray Hoff & the Off Beats (1966) Clarion Records/Festival Records (MCX 11226)

=== Singles ===
- "Little Queenie" (1964) RCA
- "Love, Love, Love" (1965) Action Records/Festival Records (MX 25677)
- "Let's Go, Let's Go, Let's Go" (May 1966) Clarion Records/Festival Records (MCP 011)
- "Bama-Lama-Bama-Loo" (1966) Clarion Records/Festival Records (MCK 1361)
- "Tossin' and Turnin'" (October 1966) Clarion Records/Festival Records (MCK 1520)
