= Stevie Wright =

Australian singer (1947–2015)

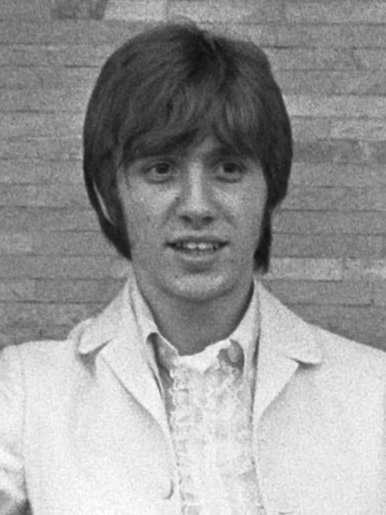
- Wright in 1968

Background information
- Also known as: Chris Langdon; Little Stevie
- Born: Stephen Carlton Wright; 20 December 1947; Leeds, England
- Origin: Melbourne, Victoria, Australia
- Died: 27 December 2015 (aged 68) Moruya, New South Wales, Australia
- Genres: Rock and roll; pop
- Occupation: Singer
- Years active: 1963–c. 2009
- Labels: EMI; Parlophone; Albert
- Formerly of: The Outlaws; Chris Langdon & the Langdells; The Easybeats; Rachette; The Stevie Wright Band

Stephen Carlton Wright (20 December 1947 – 27 December 2015) was an Australian singer, songwriter, and musician. Called Australia's first international pop star, he is best known for being the lead singer of the Easybeats, who are widely regarded as the greatest Australian pop band of the 1960s.

Born in Leeds, Wright migrated with his family to Australia at the age of nine, living in Melbourne and later Sydney at the Villawood Migrant Hostel, where he met his future bandmates and formed the Easybeats. Their early hits were co-written by Wright with bandmate George Young, including top ten hits such as "She's So Fine", "Wedding Ring", "Sorry" and "Women (Make You Feel Alright)". He was lead vocalist on their only international hit, "Friday on My Mind", which peaked at number one in Australia in 1966, the top ten in the United Kingdom, and the top twenty in the United States and Canada.

After the Easybeats disbanded in 1969, Wright fronted numerous groups including the Stevie Wright Band and Stevie Wright & the Allstars; his solo career included the 1974 single "Evie (Parts 1, 2 & 3)", which peaked at number one on the Kent Music Report Singles Chart. Wright had problems with alcohol and drug addiction. By 1976 he was hospitalised and undertook methadone treatment. In the late 1970s he was treated at Chelmsford Private Hospital by Harry Bailey, who administered deep sleep therapy with a combination of drug-induced coma and electroshock.

Wright's life was detailed in two biographies, Sorry: The Wretched Tale of Little Stevie Wright by Jack Marx (1999) and Hard Road: The Life and Times of Stevie Wright by Glenn Goldsmith (2004). On 14 July 2005, the Easybeats, with Wright as a member, were inducted into the ARIA Hall of Fame.

== History ==
=== Early years: 1964–69 ===
Wright was born in Leeds, England, in 1947 to George Wright and Dorothy Wright (née Longden). His family migrated to Melbourne, Australia, when he was nine. They moved to Sydney in 1960 and lived in Villawood near the Villawood Migrant Hostel. He was lead vocalist for local band The Outlaws, and by 1964 had formed Chris Langdon & the Langdells, which initially played The Shadows-styled surf music but converted to beat music under the influence of The Beatles.

After a Langdells performance, Wright met the Dutch-born Johannes Hendrikus Jacob van den Berg (later Harry Vanda), who was staying at Villawood Migrant Hostel, and his compatriot Dingeman van der Sluys (later Dick Diamonde). This introduction was arranged by their first manager, Alan Kissick. The pair convinced Wright to form a band with Vandenberg's friend and fellow hostel resident Scottish-born George Young. Together with another Englishman, Gordon "Snowy" Fleet, they formed the Easybeats in mid-1964. The initial line-up of the Easybeats was Diamonde on bass guitar, Fleet on drums, Vanda on guitar, Wright on vocals and Young on guitar.

During his time with the Easybeats, Wright was popularly and affectionately known as "Little Stevie". Early hits for the Easybeats were co-written by Wright with bandmate Young, including "She's So Fine" (No. 3, 1965), "Wedding Ring" (No. 7, 1965), "Women (Make You Feel Alright)" (No. 4, 1966), "Come and See Her" (No. 3, 1966), "I'll Make You Happy" (track on Easyfever EP, No. 1, 1966), and "Sorry" (No. 1, 1966).

He was lead vocalist on their only international hit, "Friday on My Mind", which peaked at No. 1 in Australia in 1966. It made No. 6 in the UK, Top 10 in Germany, the Netherlands, France and Italy and Top 20 in the US in 1967. In 2001, the song was voted the Best Australian Song of All Time by the Australasian Performing Right Association, Wright was renowned for his energetic stage performance, which included acrobatic back-flips and mod dance moves. The Easybeats disbanded in the UK in 1969 with Vanda & Young becoming freelance musicians, songwriters and producers.

Aside from tracks for the Easybeats, Wright and George Young also wrote "Step Back" for Johnny Young (no relation) and his band Kompany, released in May 1966, which peaked at No. 1.

=== Solo success: 1972–75 ===
After the break-up of the Easybeats in 1969, Wright returned to Sydney from the UK, and he formed a backing group, Rachette. He produced the debut single for local band Bootleg, "Whole World Should Slow Down", in 1970. By late 1971, he was in Perth, and joined Likefun with Ray Hoff on vocals (ex-Off Beats), Morri Pierson on vocals, Shirley Reid on vocals, John Tucak on bass guitar and Alan Wilks on organ. He soon returned to Sydney and from mid-1972 took the role of Simon Zealotes in the Australian stage production of Jesus Christ Superstar. Also in 1972, he joined Black Tank with Rory O'Donoghue on guitar and vocals (ex-The Pogs), Ken Firth on bass guitar (Tully) and Greg Henson on drums (Levi Smith Clefs).

Wright signed with Albert Productions label in late 1973, which reunited him with former bandmates Vanda and Young, who had returned from the UK and were now staff producers and songwriters. Wright formed Stevie Wright & the Allstars for live performances; the line-up included, Johnny Dick on drums (ex-Billy Thorpe & the Aztecs), Tim Gaze on lead guitar (Tamam Shud, Kahvas Jute, Ariel), and Warren Morgan on piano (Chain, Billy Thorpe & the Aztecs). In April 1974 he released his debut solo LP, Hard Road, which featured the single "Evie (Parts 1, 2 & 3)" released in May. The song was written and produced by Vanda & Young. It became a hit—the first 11-minute song to chart at No. 1 anywhere in the world— and is now regarded as an Australian rock classic. Part 1 is subtitled, "Let Your Hair Hang Down", and part 3 is "I'm Losing You".

Wright performed three concerts at the Sydney Opera House with backing by Vanda, Young and AC/DC's Malcolm Young (George Young's brother). Another Vanda & Young-produced LP, Black-eyed Bruiser, followed in 1975, but it failed to chart in the Top 50. By mid-1975, the Allstars had transferred to John Paul Young (no relation) and Wright formed the Stevie Wright Band with Tony Bolton on drums (Aesop's Fables, Country Radio), Larry Duryea on percussion (Tamam Shud), Russell Johnson on guitar (Mississippi, Country Radio), Billy Rylands on bass guitar (Lotus) and Peter White on keyboards.

=== Later years ===
By 1976, Wright was addicted to heroin, which he had reportedly begun using during his time in the cast of Jesus Christ Superstar. He was hospitalised and undertook methadone treatment. His mental health suffered further after his self-admission to Chelmsford Private Hospital. A psychiatrist, Harry Bailey, administered a highly controversial treatment, deep sleep therapy, which was alleged to treat drug addiction by a combination of drug-induced coma and electroconvulsive therapy. Many patients, including Wright, suffered brain damage and lifelong aftereffects. The scandal was later exposed, and Bailey died by suicide.

In 1982, Wright joined Vanda and Young in their studio band, Flash and the Pan, to provide vocals on their album Headlines and the related singles, "Where were You?" in July, and "Waiting for a Train" in December. The same year, there was talk of an Easybeats reunion. Wright told Juke Magazine in 1983 that they "had our lawyers working out the deal" because there was a venue interested in having them "but at the last minute they tried to change the venue and we just said 'forget it'."

In 1983, there was talk of a solo album with work involving Vanda and Young again. Wright said the album would best be described as "classy rock 'n' roll", and the songs were about "a wide spectrum of all the experiences I've been through". He said the love songs he had were optimistic. The interview discussed how Wright worked in the studio with Vanda and Young:

"Well, it's a three way thing. They'll sit down and say 'we've got this sort of song' and we'll discuss how we'll approach it. Obviously after this long we do have a very strong bond. I've written a couple of songs but since they're far better at it than I am, I'll let them handle that."

According to the Juke Magazine article it was "due for release later that year"; however, this never happened.

In January 1984, Wright was charged with attempted housebreaking, days after attending Westmount drug rehabilitation centre. He was arrested for heroin use later that month. He had been using heroin since about 1973, and, according to Wright, he remained an addict for 20 years.

The Easybeats re-formed for a brief Australian tour in 1986, and Wright re-formed variations of the Stevie Wright Band in 1986–88. Wright's substance-abuse problems continued into the 1980s and 1990s and he came close to death on several occasions but was supported by his partner, Fay Walker.

In April (4th) 1992, Stevie performed at Coogee Bay Hotel (Selinas) with a backing band that consisted of members from Sydney band Not So Sweet ( Dean Vitale - drums, Maurice Tabone - Guitar and, Wayne Vitale - Bass) along with Peter Walke - Guitar, and 2x female backing vocalists (one of whom was Di Soloman) and an additional male keyboardist. This live performance was billed, at the time, as Stevies farewell concert, although it was ultimately not his final live performance. The Selinas gig/concert from that night in April 1992, was filmed and, whilst not currently in the public domain, the entire show was recorded by Sydney based filmmaker, Peter C. Robinson, who is the copyright holder of that recording. Other filming of this performance in April 1992 also took place by other/larger news media operators at that time. Much of these details about this particular performance have not been available online until now.

His meteoric rise and fall has made him a frequent media subject. In 1999, journalist Jack Marx published a much-anticipated biography, Sorry – The Wretched Tale of Little Stevie Wright. It was critically applauded by some reviewers. Australian music historian Clinton Walker called it "gonzo journalism at its best". The Bulletin later referred to Sorry as "one of the most harrowing rock books ever written". Sorry was dismissed by Wright, his fans and other critics. Internet reviewer Ken Grady (Luna Kafé, 1999) described Marx as "a self serving hypocrite" and concluded his review by observing: "The only thing that Marx has achieved is to depict himself as a very unlikeable, morally bankrupt leech."

Long Way to the Top was a 2001 Australian Broadcasting Corporation (ABC) six-part documentary on the history of Australian rock and roll from 1956 to the modern era. "Episode 2: Ten Pound Rocker", broadcast on 22 August, featured interviews with Harry Vanda and Johnny Young. Vanda described meeting George Young, while Johnny Young (no relation) described how Wright wrote the lyrics for "Step Back". During August 2002, promoters Michael Chugg and Kevin Jacobsen organised a related concert tour, Long Way to the Top. Wright had seriously injured his ankle in a fall, so concerts had him performing "Evie", with The Allstars, while seated on a stool. Performances at two Sydney concerts in September were recorded, broadcast on ABC-TV and subsequently released on DVD in December. His authorised biography, Hard Road: The Life and Times of Stevie Wright, by Glenn Goldsmith was published in 2004. As of 2001, Wright lived near Canberra with his partner Fay Walker, and he had a son, Nicholas, born in 1972 or 1973.

On 14 July 2005, the Easybeats, with Wright as a member, were inducted into the ARIA Hall of Fame alongside Renée Geyer, Hunters & Collectors, Smoky Dawson, Split Enz and Normie Rowe.

On 31 January 2009, Wright headlined the Legends of Rock festival in Byron Bay. Songs played included "Sorry", "I'll Make You Happy", "Evie (part 2)", "Friday on My Mind", "She's So Fine" and "Wedding Ring". He was interviewed for the Macquarie Regional Radioworks program Sunday Groovies, by Kym Ferguson, on 11 February. He reported that 2009 was an exciting and busy year with new material and previously unreleased tracks expected.

Wright retired and lived on the South Coast of New South Wales. He died on 27 December 2015 at Moruya Hospital of pneumonia. His funeral was held at St Andrew's Cathedral in Sydney on 8 January 2016.

== Bibliography ==
- Goldsmith, Glenn (2004). Hard Road: The Life and Times of Stevie Wright. Milsons Point, NSW: Random House. ISBN 1-74051-261-8. NOTE: only overview is available for on-line version.
- Marx, Jack (1999). Sorry : The Wretched Tale of Little Stevie Wright. Sydney, NSW: Macmillan. ISBN 0-7329-0920-1. NOTE: only overview is available for on-line version.

== Discography ==
The Easybeats

Flash and the Pan

Stevie Wright, Stevie Wright Band, Stevie Wright & the Allstars

=== Albums ===
==== Studio albums ====
Title	Album details	Peak chart positions
Title	Album details	AUS
Hard Road	Released: May 1974; Label: Albert Productions (APLP 005)	2
Black Eyed Bruiser	Released: August 1975; Label: Albert Productions (APLP 012)	61
Striking It Rich	Released: 1989; Label: Broad Music (EMD014)	–

==== Compilation albums ====
Title	Album details
Facing the Music	Released: 1986; Label: Albert Productions (APLP-431069)
Definitive Collection	Released: 2004; Label: Festival Mushroom Records (337802)

=== Singles ===
Year	Title	Peak chart positions	Album
Year	Title	AUS KMR	Album
1974	"Hard Road"	—	Hard Road
1974	"Evie (Parts 1, 2 & 3)"	1	Hard Road
1974	"Guitar Band"	13	Hard Road
1975	"You"	88	Black Eyed Bruiser
1975	"Black Eyed Bruiser"	99	Black Eyed Bruiser
"—" denotes a recording that did not chart or was not released in that territory.

== Awards and nominations ==
=== Australian Songwriter's Hall of Fame ===
The Australian Songwriters Hall of Fame was established in 2004 to honour the lifetime achievements of some of Australia's greatest songwriters.

Year	Nominee / work	Award	Result
2005	himself	Australian Songwriter's Hall of Fame	inducted
