= The Pictures =

Australian rock band

- Origin: Melbourne, Victoria, Australia
- Genres: Rock
- Years active: 2000–2012, 2021–present (One-off reunions: 2018, 2019)
- Labels: Smash Records, High Spot Recording Company
- Members: Davey Lane; Brett Wolfenden; Luke Thomas
- Past members: Leigh White; Johnny T

The Pictures are an Australian rock band based in Melbourne, Victoria. They were founded in 2000 as a side-project by Davey Lane, the lead guitarist of Australian alternative rock band You Am I. In their initial run, The Pictures released three studio albums, as well as three EPs.

The Pictures debut album, Pieces of Eight, was recorded in February 2005 at Sing Sing Studios, Melbourne. For that album, with Lane, on lead vocals and guitar, were Luke Thomas on vocals and bass guitar and Johnny T on vocals and drums. In June the album peaked at No. 7 on the ARIA Hitseekers Albums Chart. Their debut single, "Pissin' with the Catman", reached the top 100 in May 2005 on the related ARIA Singles Chart. Its follow-up, "I Don't Care", peaked at No. 37 in September.

After drummer Johnny T left the band to focus on family life, The Pictures enlisted the help of Russell Hopkinson of You Am I and Joel Ellis of Mink Jaguar and Nunchukka Superfly on the 2008 album Kicking Indifference. Their live line-up subsequently included Melburnian drummer, Zac Anthony of The Wellingtons (also formerly a member of The Hovercrafts). The Pictures also recorded a version of Kelis' Milkshake for Triple J's regular Like a Version segment, along with one of their own tracks.

By 2013, Lane had started his solo career and The Pictures had disbanded.

The Pictures reunited in 2018 and 2019 for a small selection of Melbourne shows. In January 2021, Lane again announced the return of The Pictures via his Instagram page. The band performed their first show in nearly two years at Melbourne's Lulie Tavern in early February 2021. This would later extend into a full-scale reunion of the original trio, with the band going on to record their third studio album throughout 2021 and into 2022. In September 2022, the band released "I Can't Hold It Back", the lead single from their as-yet-untitled new album that is slated for an early 2023 release.

== Discography ==
=== Albums ===
- Pieces of Eight (Smash Records, 2005)
- The Fantastic Sounds of the Pictures (Rarities) (2007)
- Kicking Indifference (2008)

=== EPs ===
- I Dealt a Rollercoaster (2002)
- Somethin' I Don't Know (2003)
- Singin' It Just to See (2004)

=== Singles ===
List of singles, with selected chart positions
Title	Year	Peak chart positions	Album
Title	Year	AUS	Album
"Pissin' with the Catman"	2005	78	Pieces of Eight
"I Don't Care"	2005	37	Pieces of Eight
"Can You Hear It"	2009	—	Kicking Indifference
"I Can't Hold It Back"	2022	—	TBA
