= Flashpoint Music =

Australian record label

Flashpoint Music was an independent production house and record label based in Sydney, Australia that specialised in original indie rock and pop music productions. Flashpoint Records and Flashpoint Music Publishing were associated companies.

== History ==
After a 27-year tenure with the iconic independent record label Albert Productions, legendary Australian songwriter and producer Harry Vanda partnered with his son, Daniel Vandenberg, to establish a recording studio in Surry Hills, Sydney. One of the first projects brought to them was by Nic Cester of Jet who had formed the Australian supergroup The Wrights in 2004. The project resulted in a re-make of the 11 minute, mid-70s hit for Stevie Wright, "Evie Parts 1, 2 & 3" which peaked in the Australian ARIAnet singles chart at #2 in March 2005. Later that year, Harry and Daniel teamed up with David Hasselhoff, recording and producing a #3 hit on the UK Singles Chart, "Jump In My Car".

The Melbourne-based indie rock outfit British India signed to Flashpoint Music in after their manager Glenn Goldsmith had a chance encounter with Harry Vanda. British India's 2007 debut album Guillotine, was nominated for a J Award by Australian radio station triple j. In December of that year, British India won the AIR Award for 'Best New Independent Artist' and had two entries into triple j's Hottest 100 countdown. In July 2008 the band released their second album Thieves which entered the ARIAnet Albums chart at #5.

== Selected albums produced or co-produced by Harry Vanda ==
- Vigil - Easybeats
- Friends - Easybeats
- Hard Road - Stevie Wright
- High Voltage - AC/DC
- Black-Eyed Bruiser - Stevie Wright
- T.N.T. - AC/DC
- Dirty Deeds Done Dirt Cheap - AC/DC
- Let There Be Rock - AC/DC
- The Angels - The Angels
- Love Is In The Air - John Paul Young
- Powerage - AC/DC
- Flash and the Pan - Flash and the Pan
- Rose Tattoo - Rose Tattoo
- If You Want Blood You've Got It - AC/DC
- Lights in the Night - Flash and the Pan
- Rock And Roll Women - Cheetah
- Assault & Battery - Rose Tattoo
- Headlines - Flash and the Pan
- Scarred For Life - Rose Tattoo
- Early Morning Wake Up Call - Flash and the Pan
- Who Made Who - AC/DC
- Blow Up Your Video - AC/DC
- Mark Williams ZNZ - Mark Williams
- Guillotine - British India
- Thieves - British India

== Sources ==
- The Encyclopedia of Australian Rock and Pop - Ian McFarlane - Allen & Unwin, Sydney - 1999
- Who's Who In Australia 2006 XLII Edition - Crown Content, Melbourne
- Evie single - CD liner notes
