= Guillotine (British India album) =

Studio album by British India
- Released: 30 June 2007
- Recorded: 2006
- Studio: Flashpoint Studios
- Genres: Garage rock, Indie rock
- Length: 34:02
- Labels: Flashpoint Music; Shock Records
- Producers: Harry Vanda; Glenn Goldsmith

British India chronology
Counter Culture (EP) (2005)	Guillotine (2007)	Thieves (2008)

Singles from Guillotine
- 1. "Black & White Radio" Released: 2006; 2. "Tie Up My Hands" Released: 28 May 2007; 3. "Run the Red Light" Released: 10 November 2007

Guillotine is the debut studio album by the Australian indie rock band British India, released on 30 June 2007 in Australia and New Zealand by the independent record label Flashpoint Music and distributed by Shock Records. Recording sessions for the album took place at Flashpoint Studios in Surry Hills, Sydney, owned by legendary Australian musician and songwriter, Harry Vanda.

The critically acclaimed album was supported by three singles; "Black & White Radio", "Tie Up My Hands" and "Run the Red Light". Each single was released with its own music video, showcasing the band's aesthetic and providing a visual representation of the album's core themes.

== Release and reception ==
Guillotine was a commercial success among fans, critics and industry associations alike, selling 20,000 copies and earning the band multiple nominations and awards for their work. The album received a considerable amount of airtime from the Australian youth-focused radio station Triple J, being selected as the programs 'Feature Album' for the whole week following its release.

Due to this consistent support, Guillotine peaked at #4 on the AIR Charts for the month of July. In December 2007, British India's critically acclaimed debut album won 'Best Independent Artist' at the AIR Awards, becoming the bands first official industry award. Later that month, Guillotine was nominated for 'Australian Album of the Year' at the J Awards.

== Track listing ==
All tracks are written by British India (Declan Melia, Nic Wilson, Will Drummond, Matt O'Gorman).

Guillotine
No.	Title	Length
1.	"Black & White Radio"	2:37
2.	"Tie Up My Hands"	3:37
3.	"Run the Red Light"	3:39
4.	"Houseparty"	3:31
5.	"Russian Roulette"	3:49
6.	"Teenage Mother"	3:08
7.	"Edgy Looking Clothes"	2:05
8.	"Automatic Pulse"	2:59
9.	"Council Flat"	5:24
10.	"Outside 109"	3:08
Total length:		34:02

Guillotine – Limited Edition (Bonus Live Tour DVD)
No.	Title	Length
1.	"Teenage Mother" (Live)	4:01
2.	"Russian Roulette" (Live)	5:06
3.	"Funeral for a Trend" (Live)	5:19
4.	"Black & White Radio" (Live)	2:58
5.	"Black & White Radio" (Clip)	2:33
6.	"Tie Up My Hands" (Clip)	3:32
7.	"Run the Red Light" (Clip)	3:38
Total length:		1:01:09

== Release history ==
Region	Date	Label	Format	Catalogue
Australia	30 June 2007	Flashpoint Music, Shock Records	CD, Digital download	BI002
Australia	19 January 2008	Flashpoint Music, Shock Records	CD, Digital download	BI002/A
