= Waiting for a Train (Flash and the Pan song) =

1982 single by Flash and the Pan

- German 7-inch single cover

Single by Flash and the Pan

from the album Headlines
- B-side: "Love Is a Gun"; "Don't Vote"
- Released: 1983
- Length: 4:44; 3:40 (7-inch single edit)
- Label: Albert Productions
- Songwriters: Harry Vanda; George Young
- Producers: Harry Vanda; George Young

Flash and the Pan singles chronology
| "Where Were You" (1982) | "Waiting for a Train" (1983) | "Down Among the Dead Men" (1983) |

"Waiting for a Train" is a song by the Australian musical group Flash and the Pan. It is taken from their 1982 album Headlines and was their most successful single, reaching number seven on the UK singles chart in 1983. In the band's native Australia, the track peaked at number 66 on the Kent Music Report.

== Versions ==
The single version (alternatively known as "French Take") includes a different intro than the LP cut and lacks an entire verse and some of the chorus lyrics. There were also three period remixes: The "disco version" (5:42) is patterned after the single version, whereas the "extended version" (7:18) is based on the album take. The "instrumental version" (6:45) mostly lacks lyrics.

In 1989, a new version of the song, remixed by Harry Schulz and Kaplan Kaye and titled "Waiting for a Train '89 (The Harrymeetskaplan mix)", was released in the UK on Cha Cha Records.

In 1996, new remixes were commissioned and released as a CD single as well as on the double CD Hits Collection: "John Springate's OO Gauge Mix12" (7:35), "John Springate's Radio Edit" (4:19), "The Mapotasi Remix" (4:33, remixed by Ndingo Mapotasi and Barry Andrews) and "The Flying Scotsman Remix" (4:33, remixed by Sam Horsburgh).

== UK single release ==
The UK single was released on Easy Beat Records and distributed by Ensign Records Ltd. The UK 7-inch single consists of an A-side edited version (4:06) with the B-side being the 12-inch instrumental version (6:39). The UK single catalogue number is EASY 1.

== Charts ==
| Chart (1983) | Peak position |
|---|---|
| Australia (Kent Music Report) | 66 |
| Belgium (Ultratop 50 Flanders) | 15 |
| Ireland (IRMA) | 11 |
| Israel (Kol Yisrael) | 10 |
| Netherlands (Dutch Top 40) | 21 |
| Netherlands (Single Top 100) | 26 |
| New Zealand (Recorded Music NZ) | 26 |
| UK Singles (Official Charts) | 7 |
| Uruguay (UPI) | 9 |
