= George Young (rock musician) =

Australian rock musician (1946–2017)

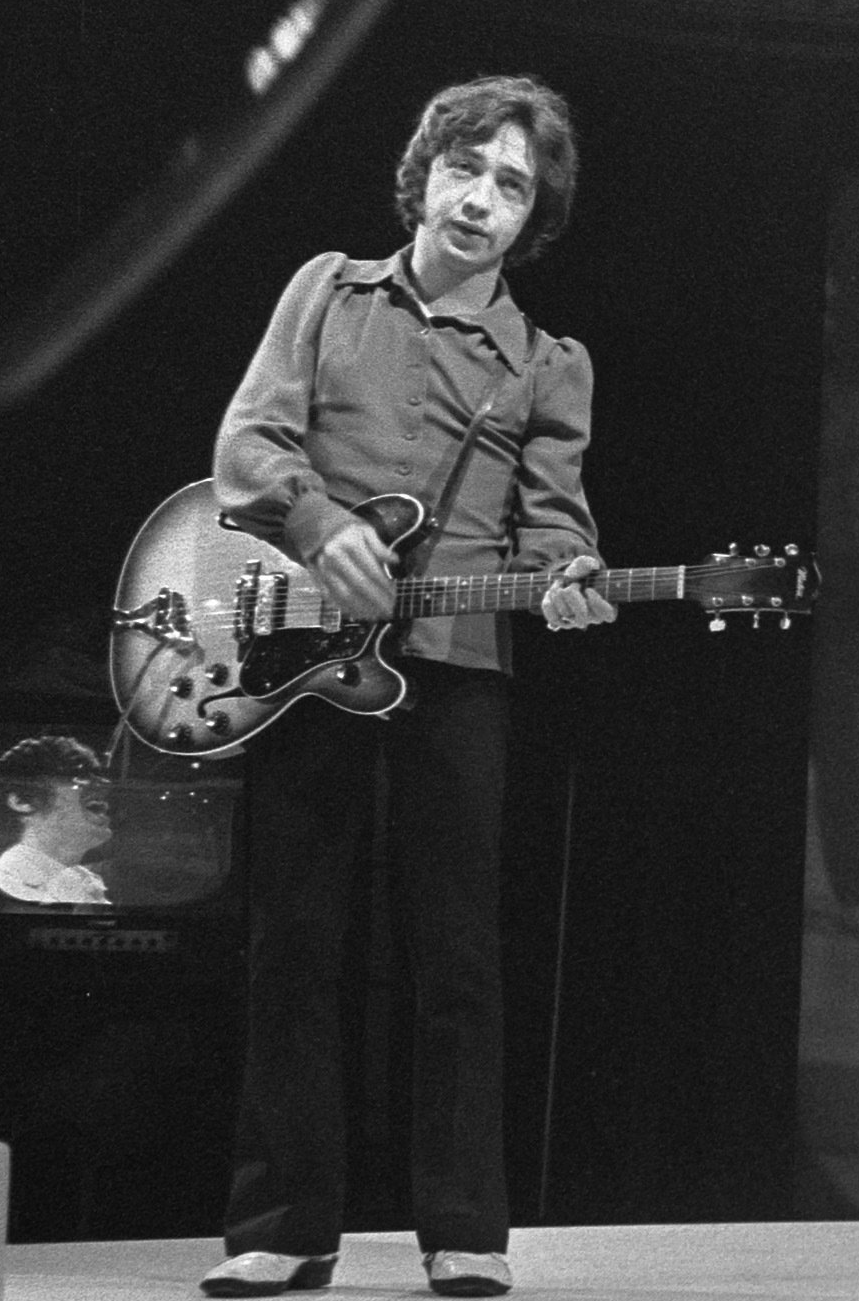
- Young in 1968

Background information
- Born: George Redburn Young; 6 November 1946; Glasgow, Scotland
- Origin: Sydney, New South Wales, Australia
- Died: 22 October 2017 (aged 70) Singapore
- Genre: Rock
- Occupations: Musician; songwriter; record producer
- Instrument: Guitar
- Years active: 1964–1992 (as a musician)
- Formerly of: The Easybeats; Vanda & Young; Marcus Hook Roll Band; AC/DC; Flash and the Pan

George Redburn Young (6 November 1946 – 22 October 2017) was an Australian musician, songwriter and record producer. He was a founding member of the bands The Easybeats and Flash and the Pan, and was one-half of the songwriting and production duo Vanda & Young with his long-time musical collaborator Harry Vanda, with whom he co-wrote the international hits "Friday on My Mind" and "Love Is in the Air", the latter recorded by John Paul Young (who is unrelated).

Born in Glasgow, Young moved to Sydney, Australia with his family as a teenager, and became a naturalised citizen. He was also one of the producers of early work by the Australian hard rock band AC/DC, formed by his younger brothers Malcolm and Angus Young. Young (along with Vanda) was inducted into the ARIA Hall of Fame in 1988 and The Easybeats were inducted in 2005.

== Early years ==
George Redburn Young was born 6 November 1946 in Glasgow, Scotland. Young's father, William Young (born 16 February 1911), and his family lived at 6 Skerryvore Road in the Cranhill district of Glasgow in Scotland. William worked first as a wheel boy in a rope works and then as a machine and saw operator in an asbestos and cement business. In 1940, William joined the Royal Air Force serving in World War II as a flight engine mechanic. After the war, William worked as a yard man for a builder and then as a postman. His wife, Young's mother, Margaret (born 14 July 1913; her maiden name was also Young) was a housewife.

The 'big freeze' of 1962–63 was the worst winter on record in Scotland, with snow eight feet deep. A TV advertisement at the same time offered assisted travel for families for a different life in Australia. Fifteen members of the Young family left Scotland by aeroplane in late June 1963, including William's fifth son, George, and younger sons Malcolm (6 January 1953 – 18 November 2017) and Angus (born 31 March 1955). Also aboard were George's eldest brother Stephen (24 June 1933 – 1989) and his wife and two sons, one of whom was Stevie Young (who later joined AC/DC to replace his uncle, Malcolm Young), his only sister, Mrs Margaret Horsburgh (2 May 1935 – 2019) and her husband and son, and brother William Jr (born 15 December 1940 – 2011) and his wife. Another elder brother, Alex (28 December 1938 – 4 August 1997), stayed in the UK, and was later a member of London-based group Grapefruit. A final brother, John Young (born 17 May 1937), had migrated to Australia separately. Malcolm later described the family's musical background: "All the males in our family played, Stevie, the oldest played accordion, Alex and John were the first couple to play guitar, and being older it was sort of passed down to George, then myself, then Angus."

Initially staying at Villawood Migrant Hostel (a site later developed as Villawood Immigration Detention Centre) in Nissen huts, George Young met and became friends with another migrant, Harry Vanda. The William Young family moved into a semi-detached house at 4 Burleigh Street in the Sydney suburb of Burwood. For secondary schooling, Young attended Chester Hill High School across the road from the migrant hostel until he was expelled in 1964 for having long hair. Malcolm Young, his younger brother, attended the same school for a time until the family moved to Burwood. George Young married Sandra Ramsey in London in 1969.

== The Easybeats (1964–1969) ==
George Young started his music career in Sydney. He formed there a beat pop band, the Easybeats, in late 1964, himself playing rhythm guitar alongside Dick Diamonde (born Dingeman Vandersluys) on bass guitar, Gordon "Snowy" Fleet on drums (ex-Mojos), Harry Vanda (born Johannes Vandenberg) on lead guitar (ex-Starfighters, Starlighters) and Stevie Wright on lead vocals (ex-Chris Langdon and the Langdells). All of the members had a connection with Villawood Migrant Hostel, and their early rehearsals were held in its laundry room.

Aside from performing and recording, Young co-wrote nearly all of their tracks. Early top 10 hits on the Australian singles chart for the Easybeats were co-written by Young with bandmate Wright: "She's So Fine" (No. 3, 1965), "Wedding Ring" (No. 7, 1965), "Women (Make You Feel Alright)" (No. 4, 1966), "Come and See Her" (No. 3, 1966), "I'll Make You Happy" (track on Easyfever extended play, No. 1, 1966), and "Sorry" (No. 1, 1966). Later top 10 hits were written with Vanda, "Friday on My Mind" (No. 1, 1966) and "Heaven and Hell" (No. 8, 1967). The Easybeats relocated to the UK to record and perform, but the group disbanded in late 1969.

== Vanda & Young ==
After the Easybeats dissolved, Young formed a production and songwriting duo with Vanda in 1970, as Vanda & Young, initially living in London. They provided pop and rock songs for other recording artists, and for themselves under various stage names: Paintbox, Tramp, Eddie Avana, Moondance, Haffy's Whiskey Sour, and Band of Hope. The pair worked with Young's elder brother Alex in Grapefruit. Young and Vanda returned to Sydney in 1973 where they worked for Ted Albert, at his Albert Productions recording studio to become the in house producers.

One studio-based group, Marcus Hook Roll Band, was joined in 1974 by Young's brothers, Malcolm and Angus. The brothers had already formed a hard rock group, AC/DC, in 1973. Young helped them with AC/DC, which went on to become a success internationally. He declared to his brothers "that he didn't believe a band can ever call itself a band until it's done at least 200 gigs". With Vanda he co-produced AC/DC's early albums, High Voltage (1975), T.N.T. (1975), High Voltage (1976), Dirty Deeds Done Dirt Cheap (1976), Let There Be Rock (1977) and Powerage (1978). Young briefly played as AC/DC's bass guitarist, early in their career. He and Vanda also co-produced the title track and two instrumental tracks on AC/DC's Who Made Who album in 1986 and the Blow Up Your Video album in 1988. Young alone also handled production duties for AC/DC's Stiff Upper Lip album in 2000. He also made the suggestion that "It's a Long Way to the Top" should include bagpipes after having heard that Bon Scott had played in a pipe band, not knowing that he was actually a drummer.

In mid-1976 Young formed Flash and the Pan, initially as a studio-based duo with himself on guitar, keyboards and vocals, and Vanda on guitar and keyboards. They had local top 10 hits on the Kent Music Report Singles Chart with "Hey, St. Peter" (No. 5, September 1976) and "Down Among the Dead Men" (No. 4, July 1978). The group's ninth single, "Waiting for a Train" (December 1982), had lead vocals by their former bandmate, Stevie Wright. When the single was issued in Europe in April 1983 it peaked at No. 7 in the UK, No. 15 in Belgium and No. 26 in the Netherlands.

Vanda & Young also co-produced work for Wright, John Paul Young (no relation), the Angels and Rose Tattoo. As songwriters they provided the three-part "Evie" (April 1974) for Wright, which became a number one hit in Australia. They co-wrote, "Love Is in the Air" (December 1977), for John Paul Young, which reached No. 3 in Australia.

After retiring from the music industry in the late 1990s, Young lived mainly in Portugal with his family. He spent his last years in Singapore.

== Death ==
George Young died in Singapore on 22 October 2017 at the age of 70, nearly four weeks before his younger brother Malcolm (of AC/DC) died. A cause of death was not reported and it is not known if he was buried or cremated.

== Honours and awards ==
=== ARIA Awards ===
Year	Nominee / work	Award	Result
1988	himself	ARIA Hall of Fame	inducted

=== Australian Songwriters Hall of Fame ===
The Australian Songwriters Hall of Fame was established in 2004 to honour the lifetime achievements of some of Australia's greatest songwriters.

Year	Nominee / work	Award	Result
2004	himself	Australian Songwriters Hall of Fame	inducted

=== MPEG Awards ===
The Music Producer and Engineers’ Guild (MPEG Awards) Awards celebrate excellence in music production and engineering in Australia. They commenced in 2024.

Year	Nominee / work	Award	Result (wins only)	Ref.
2025	Vanda & Young	Lifetime Achievement Award	awarded	

In May 2001, the Australasian Performing Right Association (APRA) in May 2001 conducted a survey of music industry personnel to determine, the "ten best and most significant Australian songs of the past 75 years." The survey listed "Friday on My Mind" at No. 1, and at the APRA Music Awards of 2001 ceremony You Am I performed the track with Vanda guesting on guitar.

At the ARIA Music Awards of 2005, the Easybeats, including Young and Vanda, were inducted into the Hall of Fame.

In 2007, Australian Musician magazine selected the meeting of Vanda and Young at the Villawood migrant hostel in 1964 as the most significant event in Australian pop and rock music history. Since 2009, APRA has run the Vanda & Young Global Songwriting Competition.

== Selected list of Vanda & Young productions ==
- Stevie Wright
- AC/DC
- John Paul Young
- The Angels
- Rose Tattoo
- Flash and the Pan
- Ted Mulry Gang
- Strongheart American Rock trio
- Ray Arnott

== Selected list of Vanda & Young songs ==
- "Friday on My Mind" – The Easybeats (1966) Aust #1, US #16, UK #6, also recorded by David Bowie and Gary Moore
- "Good Times" – The Easybeats, INXS with Jimmy Barnes
- "Love Is in the Air" – John Paul Young (1978) Aust #2, US #7, UK #5
- "Walking in the Rain" – Flash and the Pan, Grace Jones
- "Evie – Parts 1, 2 & 3" – Stevie Wright, Pat Travers Band, The Wrights
- "Hey St. Peter" – Flash and the Pan
- "Down Among the Dead Men" – Flash and the Pan
- "Waiting for a Train" – Flash and the Pan (1983) UK #7
