= List of top 10 singles for 1992 in Australia =

This is a list of singles that charted in the top ten of the ARIA Charts in 1992.

== Top-ten singles ==
Key

Symbol	Meaning
◁	Indicates single's top 10 entry was also its ARIA top 50 debut
(#)	1992 Year-end top 10 single position and rank

List of ARIA top ten singles that peaked in 1992
Top ten entry date	Single	Artist(s)	Peak	Peak date	Weeks in top ten	References
Singles from 1991
11 November	"Cream"	Prince and the New Power Generation	2	6 January	15	
25 November	"Let's Talk About Sex"	Salt-N-Pepa	1	20 January	15	
9 December	"Ain't No Sunshine"	Rockmelons featuring Deni Hines	5	6 January	9	
Singles from 1992
6 January	"Don't Let the Sun Go Down on Me" ◁	George Michael and Elton John	3	27 January	9	
6 January	"Come to Me"	Diesel	8	13 January	3	
13 January	"Love You Right"	Euphoria	1	17 February	11	
13 January	"Saltwater"	Julian Lennon	1	2 March	13	
13 January	"Live and Let Die"	Guns N' Roses	10	13 January	1	
20 January	"Smells Like Teen Spirit"	Nirvana	5	2 March	8	
27 January	"Justified & Ancient"	The KLF	3	24 February	8	
27 January	"Bohemian Rhapsody"	Queen	5	10 February	4	
10 February	"The Globe"	Big Audio Dynamite II	8	17 February	3	
10 February	"Finally"	CeCe Peniston	8	2 March	5	
24 February	"Remember the Time"	Michael Jackson	6	16 March	5	
24 February	"Tip of My Tongue"	Diesel	4	9 March	6	
2 March	"Dizzy"	Vic Reeves and The Wonder Stuff	3	23 March	7	
9 March	"Rocket Man (I Think It's Going to Be a Long, Long Time)"	Kate Bush	2	16 March	3	
16 March	"I Can't Dance"	Genesis	7	16 March	3	
16 March	"Marvellous!"	The 12th Man featuring MCG Hammer	1	30 March	7	
23 March	"One" ◁	U2	4	23 March	4	
23 March	"Get Ready for This"	2 Unlimited	2	6 April	8	
30 March	"High" ◁	The Cure	5	30 March	2	
30 March	"Let's Get Rocked" ◁	Def Leppard	6	13 April	5	
30 March	"Way Out West"	James Blundell and James Reyne	2	20 April	10	
6 April	"Under the Bridge" (#9)	Red Hot Chili Peppers	1	13 April	11	
6 April	"Not a Day Goes By"	Rick Price	5	13 April	7	
13 April	"Stay"	Shakespears Sister	3	18 May	9	
13 April	"To Be with You" (#4)	Mr. Big	1	11 May	11	
20 April	"Be My Baby"	Teen Queens	6	11 May	6	
20 April	"Alive"	Pearl Jam	9	27 April	3	
4 May	"I Love Your Smile"	Shanice	8	4 May	2	
4 May	"Nothing Else Matters"	Metallica	8	11 May	3	
11 May	"In the Closet"	Michael Jackson	5	11 May	4	
18 May	"James Brown Is Dead"	L.A. Style	7	18 May	3	
18 May	"Suck My Kiss"	Red Hot Chili Peppers	8	18 May	1	
18 May	"That Word (L.O.V.E.)"	Rockmelons featuring Cutty Ranks and Nardo Ranks and Deni Hines	4	1 June	8	
25 May	"One in a Million"	Euphoria	1	1 June	5	
25 May	"Take It from Me"	Girlfriend	1	8 June	8	
1 June	"Jump"	Kris Kross	1	22 June	9	
1 June	"Ordinary Angels"	Frente!	3	15 June	7	
15 June	"Save the Best for Last"	Vanessa Williams	1	13 July	9	
15 June	"I Can Feel It"	Radio Freedom	7	29 June	5	
15 June	"Cry"	Lisa Edwards	5	6 July	6	
22 June	"Too Funky"	George Michael	3	3 August	9	
22 June	"Hazard" (#10)	Richard Marx	1	20 July	10	
29 June	"Everything About You"	Ugly Kid Joe	4	10 August	10	
13 July	"Please Don't Go" (#7)	KWS	2	27 July	12	
13 July	"Heaven Knows"	Rick Price	6	10 August	5	
20 July	"Sexy MF"	Prince and the New Power Generation	5	20 July	4	
20 July	"Damn I Wish I Was Your Lover"	Sophie B. Hawkins	7	17 August	7	
3 August	"Amigos para Siempre (Friends for Life)" (#5) ◁	José Carreras and Sarah Brightman	1	10 August	11	
3 August	"This Used to Be My Playground"	Madonna	9	3 August	2	
17 August	"Rhythm Is a Dancer"	Snap!	3	31 August	9	
17 August	"Everything's Alright"	John Farnham, Kate Ceberano and Jon Stevens	6	31 August	5	
17 August	"I'll Be There (Unplugged)"	Mariah Carey	9	17 August	4	
17 August	"Humpin' Around" ◁	Bobby Brown	1	21 September	9	
24 August	"Life Is a Highway"	Tom Cochrane	2	28 September	8	
31 August	"Baby Got Back"	Sir Mix-a-Lot	8	31 August	6	
7 September	"Sesame's Treet"	Smart E's	6	14 September	5	
14 September	"November Rain" (#2)	Guns N' Roses	5	28 September	24	
14 September	"Achy Breaky Heart" (#1)	Billy Ray Cyrus	1	28 September	17	
21 September	"The Best Things in Life Are Free" (#6)	Luther Vandross and Janet Jackson	2	5 October	15	
5 October	"Love Is in the Air"	John Paul Young	3	12 October	4	
12 October	"The Day You Went Away" (#8)	Wendy Matthews	2	30 November	15	
12 October	"Do for You"	Euphoria	7	19 October	2	
19 October	"Ain't No Doubt"	Jimmy Nail	5	19 October	7	
19 October	"White Men Can't Jump"	Riff	6	19 October	4	
19 October	"My Name Is Prince" ◁	Prince and the New Power Generation	9	19 October	2	
19 October	"Sometimes Love Just Ain't Enough"	Patty Smyth and Don Henley	5	9 November	8	
26 October	"Erotica"	Madonna	4	26 October	4	
26 October	"End of the Road" (#3)	Boyz II Men	1	16 November	16	
2 November	"Keep the Faith"	Bon Jovi	10	2 November	2	
16 November	"Accidently Kelly Street"	Frente!	4	7 December	11	
23 November	"Would I Lie to You?"	Charles & Eddie	3	7 December	12	
23 November	"Something Good"	Utah Saints	10	23 November	3	
7 December	"I Will Always Love You"	Whitney Houston	1	14 December	18	
14 December	"Who's Gonna Ride Your Wild Horses"	U2	9	14 December	3	

=== 1991 peaks ===
List of ARIA top ten singles in 1992 that peaked in 1991
Top ten entry date	Single	Artist(s)	Peak	Peak date	Weeks in top ten	References
21 October	"I'm Too Sexy"	Right Said Fred	1	4 November	14	
4 November	"When Something Is Wrong with My Baby" ◁	Jimmy Barnes and John Farnham	3	4 November	10	
11 November	"Black or White" ◁	Michael Jackson	1	25 November	15	
18 November	"All 4 Love"	Color Me Badd	9	25 November	5	
9 December	"Mysterious Ways" ◁	U2	3	9 December	5	

=== 1993 peaks ===
List of ARIA top ten singles in 1992 that peaked in 1993
Top ten entry date	Single	Artist(s)	Peak	Peak date	Weeks in top ten	References
14 December	"Tequila"	A.L.T. & the Lost Civilization	8	11 January	10	
