= List of top 25 singles for 1992 in Australia =

Top 25 singles of 1992 < 1991 1993 >

Other Australian top charts for 1992
- top 25 albums

Australian number-one charts of 1992
- albums
- singles

The following lists the top 100 singles of 1992 in Australia from the Australian Recording Industry Association (ARIA) End of Year Singles Chart.

| # | Title | Artist | Highest pos. reached | Weeks at No. 1 |
|---|---|---|---|---|
| 1. | "Achy Breaky Heart" | Billy Ray Cyrus | 1 | 7 |
| 2. | "November Rain" | Guns N' Roses | 5 | (Note: "November Rain" entered the ARIA Top 50 singles chart in March 1992 and from September remained in the Top 10 for 22 weeks until February 1993, it was in the Top 50 for a total of 39 weeks.) |
| 3. | "End of the Road" | Boyz II Men | 1 | 4 |
| 4. | "To Be with You" | Mr. Big | 1 | 3 |
| 5. | "Amigos para siempre (Friends for Life)" | José Carreras and Sarah Brightman | 1 | 6 |
| 6. | "The Best Things in Life Are Free" | Luther Vandross and Janet Jackson | 2 | |
| 7. | "Please Don't Go" | K.W.S. | 2 | |
| 8. | "The Day You Went Away" | Wendy Matthews | 2 | |
| 9. | "Under the Bridge" | Red Hot Chili Peppers | 1 | 4 |
| 10. | "Hazard" | Richard Marx | 1 | 3 |
| 11. | "Save the Best for Last" | Vanessa Williams | 1 | 1 |
| 12. | "Jump" | Kris Kross | 1 | 3 |
| 13. | As Ugly as They Wanna Be (EP) | Ugly Kid Joe | 4 | |
| 14. | "Saltwater" | Julian Lennon | 1 | 4 |
| 15. | "Rhythm Is a Dancer" | Snap! | 3 | |
| 16. | "Take It from Me" | Girlfriend | 1 | 2 |
| 17. | "I Will Always Love You" | Whitney Houston | 1 | 8 (Note: "I Will Always Love You" by Whitney Houston entered the ARIA Top 50 singles chart in early December 1992 and peaked at #1 for eight weeks from the end of December, it was in the Top 50 until May 1993, for a total of 23 weeks.) |
| 18. | "Damn I Wish I Was Your Lover" | Sophie B. Hawkins | 7 | |
| 19. | "Too Funky" | George Michael | 3 | |
| 20. | Clunk EP | Frente! | 3 | |
| 21. | "Stay" | Shakespears Sister | 3 | |
| 22. | "Way Out West" | James Blundell and James Reyne | 2 | |
| 23. | "Sometimes Love Just Ain't Enough" | Patty Smyth with Don Henley | 5 | |
| 24. | "Love You Right" | Euphoria | 1 | 2 |
| 25. | "Humpin' Around" | Bobby Brown | 1 | 1 |
| 26. | "That Word (L.O.V.E.)" | Rockmelons feat. Deni Hines | 4 | |
| 27. | "Life Is a Highway" | Tom Cochrane | 2 | |
| 28. | "Get Ready for This" | 2 Unlimited | 2 | |
| 29. | "Accidently Kelly Street" | Frente! | 4 | |
| 30. | "Would I Lie to You?" | Charles & Eddie | 3 | |
| 31. | "Love Is in the Air" (Ballroom Mix) | John Paul Young | 3 | |
| 32. | "Baby Got Back" | Sir Mix-a-Lot | 8 | |
| 33. | "Ain't No Doubt" | Jimmy Nail | 5 | |
| 34. | "White Men Can't Jump" | Riff | 6 | |
| 35. | "Knockin' on Heaven's Door" | Guns N' Roses | 12 | |
| 36. | "I Can Feel It" | Radio Freedom | 7 | |
| 37. | "I'll Be There" | Mariah Carey | 9 | |
| 38. | "Alive" | Pearl Jam | 9 | |
| 39. | "Justified & Ancient" | The KLF | 3 | |
| 40. | "Everything's Alright" | John Farnham, Kate Ceberano & Jon Stevens | 6 | |
| 41. | "Cry" | Lisa Edwards | 5 | |
| 42. | "Not a Day Goes by" | Rick Price | 5 | |
| 43. | "Heaven Knows" | Rick Price | 6 | |
| 44. | "Be My Baby" | Teen Queens | 6 | |
| 45. | "This Used to Be My Playground" | Madonna | 9 | |
| 46. | "Smells Like Teen Spirit" | Nirvana | 5 | |
| 47. | "Marvellous!" | The Twelfth Man | 1 | 2 |
| 48. | "Let's Talk About Sex" | Salt-N-Pepa | 1 | 4 |
| 49. | "Dizzy" | Vic Reeves and The Wonder Stuff | 3 | |
| 50. | "How Do You Do!" | Roxette | 13 | |
| 51. | "One in a Million" | Euphoria | 1 | 1 |
| 52. | "Something Good" | Utah Saints | 10 | |
| 53. | "In the Closet" | Michael Jackson | 5 | |
| 54. | "Erotica" | Madonna | 4 | |
| 55. | "Just Another Day" | Jon Secada | 12 | |
| 56. | "Love How You Love Me" | Teen Queens | 14 | |
| 57. | "Don't Let the Sun Go Down on Me" | George Michael and Elton John | 3 | |
| 58. | "Djäpana (Sunset Dreaming)" | Yothu Yindi | 13 | |
| 59. | "Bohemian Rhapsody" | Queen | 5 | |
| 60. | "Suck My Kiss" | Red Hot Chili Peppers | 8 | |
| 61. | "James Brown Is Dead" | L.A. Style | 7 | |
| 62. | "Keep the Faith" | Bon Jovi | 10 | |
| 63. | "Cream" | Prince and The New Power Generation | 2 | |
| 64. | "God Gave Rock 'N' Roll to You II" | Kiss | 18 | |
| 65. | "Tip of My Tongue" | Diesel | 4 | |
| 66. | "The Globe" | Big Audio Dynamite II | 8 | |
| 67. | "I Can't Dance" | Genesis | 7 | |
| 68. | "Twilight Zone" | 2 Unlimited | 11 | |
| 69. | "Nothing Else Matters" | Metallica | 8 | |
| 70. | "Without You" | Girlfriend | 18 | |
| 71. | "Thought I'd Died and Gone to Heaven" | Bryan Adams | 13 | |
| 72. | "Let's Get Rocked" | Def Leppard | 6 | |
| 73. | "Do for You" | Euphoria | 7 | |
| 74. | "Sesame's Treet" | Smart E's | 6 | |
| 75. | "Beauty and the Beast" | Celine Dion and Peabo Bryson | 17 | |
| 76. | "It's Not Over" | Rockmelons feat. Deni Hines | 15 | |
| 77. | "Jam" | Michael Jackson | 11 | |
| 78. | "Simply the Best" | Tina Turner and Jimmy Barnes | 14 | |
| 79. | "Even Better Than the Real Thing" | U2 | 11 | |
| 80. | "Remember the Time" | Michael Jackson | 6 | |
| 81. | "Take This Heart" | Richard Marx | 11 | |
| 82. | "Sexy MF" | Prince and The New Power Generation | 5 | |
| 83. | "Black or White" | Michael Jackson | 1 | 6 |
| 84. | "Tennessee" | Arrested Development | 14 | |
| 85. | "My Name Is Prince" | Prince and The New Power Generation | 9 | |
| 86. | "She's Got That Vibe" | R. Kelly and Public Announcement | 28 | |
| 87. | "Girl's Life" | Girlfriend | 15 | |
| 88. | Abba-esque EP | Erasure | 13 | |
| 89. | "I Love Your Smile" | Shanice | 8 | |
| 90. | "Don't You Want Me" | Felix | 17 | |
| 91. | "One" | U2 | 4 | |
| 92. | "Tequila" | A.L.T. and the Lost Civilization | 8 | |
| 93. | "Everybody's Free (To Feel Good)" | Rozalla | 11 | |
| 94. | "The Magic Friend" | 2 Unlimited | 16 | |
| 95. | "Kickin' to the Undersound" | Sound Unlimited | 20 | |
| 96. | "Mistadobalina" | Del the Funky Homosapien | 11 | |
| 97. | "It's Probably Me" | Sting feat. Eric Clapton | 23 | |
| 98. | "Pride (In the Name of Love)" | Clivillés and Cole | 12 | |
| 99. | "Finally" | CeCe Peniston | 8 | |
| 100. | "Rocket Man" | Kate Bush | 2 | |

Peak chart positions are from the ARIA Charts, overall position on the End of Year Chart is calculated by ARIA based on the number of weeks and position that the records reach within the Top 50 singles for each week during 1992.
