= List of top 25 singles for 1991 in Australia =

Top 25 singles of 1991 < 1990 1992 >

Other Australian top charts for 1991
- top 25 albums
- Triple J Hottest 100

Australian number-one charts of 1991
- albums
- singles

The following lists the top 100 singles of 1991 in Australia from the Australian Recording Industry Association (ARIA) End of Year Singles Chart.

#	Title	Artist	Highest pos. reached	Weeks at No. 1
1.	"(Everything I Do) I Do It for You"	Bryan Adams	1	11 (Note: "(Everything I Do) I Do It for You" entered the ARIA singles chart in July 1991 and peaked at #1 in May for eleven weeks, it was in the Top 50 for 14 weeks.)
2.	Tingles (EP)	Ratcat	1	2 (Note: There is no separate chart for EPs in Australia, Tingles, a six track EP, entered the ARIA singles chart in December 1990 and peaked at #1 for two weeks and was in the Top 50 for 22 weeks. "That Ain't Bad" was the main track played on commercial radio.)
3.	"Grease Mega-Mix"	John Travolta and Olivia Newton-John	1	5
4.	"The Horses"	Daryl Braithwaite	1	2
5.	"You Could Be Mine"	Guns N' Roses	3	
6.	"Read My Lips"	Melissa	1	2
7.	"More Than Words"	Extreme	2	
8.	"I've Been Thinking About You"	Londonbeat	1	4
9.	"Joyride"	Roxette	1	3
10.	"The Shoop Shoop Song (It's in His Kiss)"	Cher	4	
11.	"Do the Bartman"	The Simpsons	1	1
12.	"Unforgettable"	Natalie Cole and Nat King Cole	2	
13.	"I'm Too Sexy"	Right Said Fred	1	3
14.	"Love... Thy Will Be Done"	Martika	1	1
15.	"I Touch Myself"	Divinyls	1	2
16.	"Rush"	Big Audio Dynamite II	1	2
17.	"Fantasy"	Black Box	3	
18.	"Rhythm of My Heart"	Rod Stewart	2	
19.	"Rush Rush"	Paula Abdul	2	
20.	"Better"	The Screaming Jets	4	
21.	"I Wanna Sex You Up"	Color Me Badd	4	
22.	"Ice Ice Baby"	Vanilla Ice	1	3
23.	"Sadeness (Part I)"	Enigma	2	
24.	"Here I Am (Come and Take Me)"	UB40	3	
25.	"3 a.m. Eternal"	The KLF	3	
26.	"Gonna Make You Sweat (Everybody Dance Now)"	C+C Music Factory	3	
27.	"Sucker DJ"	Dimples D.	1	2
28.	"Things That Make You Go Hmmm..."	C+C Music Factory	6	
29.	"Treaty" (Filthy Lucre Remix)	Yothu Yindi	11	
30.	"Falling"	Julee Cruise	1	1
31.	"Baby Baby"	Amy Grant	5	
32.	"Don't Go Now"	Ratcat	1	1
33.	"Wiggle It"	2 in a Room	3	
34.	"Black or White"	Michael Jackson	1	6
35.	"Unbelievable"	EMF	8	
36.	"I've Got to Go Now"	Toni Childs	5	
37.	"Ring Ring Ring (Ha Ha Hey)"	De La Soul	4	
38.	"When Your Love is Gone"	Jimmy Barnes	7	
39.	"Where Are You Now?"	Roxus	13	
40.	"Pump It (Nice an' Hard)"	Icy Blu	8	
41.	"Love Rears Its Ugly Head"	Living Colour	10	
42.	"Last Train to Trancentral"	The KLF	5	
43.	"Wind of Change"	Scorpions	7	
44.	"Just Like You"	Robbie Nevil	4	
45.	"Unchained Melody"	The Righteous Brothers	1	5
46.	"Crazy"	Seal	9	
47.	"Now That We Found Love"	Heavy D & the Boyz	6	
48.	"The Fly"	U2	1	1
49.	"Because I Love You (The Postman Song)"	Stevie B	8	
50.	"Enter Sandman"	Metallica	10	
51.	"From a Distance"	Bette Midler	8	
52.	"Break in the Weather"	Jenny Morris	2	
53.	"How to Dance"	Bingoboys feat. Princessa	3	
54.	"Losing My Religion"	R.E.M.	11	
55.	"Show Me Heaven"	Maria McKee	3	
56.	"Pray"	MC Hammer	7	
57.	"Sexy (Is the Word)"	Melissa	3	
58.	"Hot Chilli Woman"	Noiseworks	7	
59.	"Freedom! '90	George Michael	18	
60.	"Fading Like a Flower (Every Time You Leave)"	Roxette	7	
61.	"Don't Cry"	Guns N' Roses	5	
62.	"Ain't No Sunshine"	Rockmelons feat. Deni Hines	5	
63.	"Set Adrift on Memory Bliss"	P.M. Dawn	7	
64.	"What Comes Naturally"	Sheena Easton	4	
65.	"I Gotcha"	Jimmy Barnes	6	
66.	"Good Vibrations"	Marky Mark and the Funky Bunch feat. Loleatta Holloway	4	
67.	"Do Anything"	Natural Selection	10	
68.	"I'm Free"	The Soup Dragons	9	
69.	"I'll Be Your Baby Tonight"	Robert Palmer and UB40	4	
70.	"Live Your Life Be Free"	Belinda Carlisle	13	
71.	"Can't Stop This Thing We Started"	Bryan Adams	9	
72.	"Shocked"	Kylie Minogue	7	
73.	"Lovesick"	Gang Starr	13	
74.	"Gett Off"	Prince and The New Power Generation	8	
75.	"What Do I Have to Do"	Kylie Minogue	11	
76.	"Hold Me in Your Arms"	Southern Sons	9	
77.	"When Something Is Wrong with My Baby"	Jimmy Barnes and John Farnham	3	
78.	"Cream"	Prince and The New Power Generation	2	
79.	"All 4 Love"	Color Me Badd	9	
80.	"Do You Want Me"	Salt-N-Pepa	19	
81.	"Play That Funky Music"	Vanilla Ice	13	
82.	"Walking in Memphis"	Marc Cohn	11	
83.	"Love Takes Time"	Mariah Carey	14	
84.	"Word Is Out"	Kylie Minogue	10	
85.	"Cry for Help"	Rick Astley	13	
86.	"Nutbush City Limits" (The 90's Version)	Tina Turner	16	
87.	"Come to Me"	Diesel	8	
88.	"The Big L."	Roxette	20	
89.	"Every Heartbeat"	Amy Grant	17	
90.	"Iesha"	Another Bad Creation	17	
91.	"Emotions"	Mariah Carey	11	
92.	"Love Will Never Do (Without You)"	Janet Jackson	14	
93.	"Cherry Pie"	Warrant	6	
94.	"On the Way Up"	Elisa Fiorillo	19	
95.	"It Ain't Over 'til It's Over"	Lenny Kravitz	10	
96.	"Just Another Dream"	Cathy Dennis	14	
97.	"Miss Freelove '69"	Hoodoo Gurus	19	
98.	"Touch Me (All Night Long)"	Cathy Dennis	14	
99.	"Let's Kiss (Like Angels Do)"	Wendy Matthews	14	
100.	"Mary Had a Little Boy"	Snap!	18	

Peak chart positions are from the ARIA Charts, overall position on the End of Year Chart is calculated by ARIA based on the number of weeks and position that the records reach within the Top 50 singles for each week during 1991.
