= List of top 25 singles for 1990 in Australia =

Top 25 singles of 1990 < 1989 1991 >

Other Australian top charts for 1990
- top 25 albums
- Triple J Hottest 100

Australian number-one charts of 1990
- albums
- singles

The following lists the top 100 singles of 1990 in Australia from the Australian Recording Industry Association (ARIA) End of Year Singles Chart. ARIA had previously used the Kent Music Report, known from 1987 onwards as the Australian Music Report.

| # | Title | Artist | Highest pos. reached | Weeks at No. 1 |
|---|---|---|---|---|
| 1. | "Nothing Compares 2 U" | Sinéad O'Connor | 1 | 8 |
| 2. | "U Can't Touch This" | MC Hammer | 1 | 5 |
| 3. | "Vogue" | Madonna | 1 | 5 |
| 4. | "It Must Have Been Love" | Roxette | 1 | 2 |
| 5. | "All I Wanna Do Is Make Love to You" | Heart | 1 | 4 |
| 6. | "Opposites Attract" | Paula Abdul | 1 | 2 |
| 7. | "How Am I Supposed to Live Without You" | Michael Bolton | 2 | |
| 8. | "Unchained Melody" | The Righteous Brothers | 1 | 5 (Note: "Unchained Melody" by The Righteous Brothers had first been released in 1965, it was re-released in 1990 and peaked at #1 in late November on the ARIA chart for five weeks, it was still in the Top 50 by March 1991.) |
| 9. | "Girl I'm Gonna Miss You" | Milli Vanilli | 3 | |
| 10. | "Love Shack" | The B-52's | 1 | 6 |
| 11. | "Hold On" | Wilson Phillips | 2 | |
| 12. | "Don't Know Much" | Linda Ronstadt and Aaron Neville | 2 | |
| 13. | "Black Velvet" | Alannah Myles | 3 | |
| 14. | "Ride on Time" | Black Box | 2 | |
| 15. | "Mona" | Craig McLachlan & Check 1-2 | 3 | |
| 16. | "Joey" | Concrete Blonde | 2 | |
| 17. | "I Need Your Body" | Tina Arena | 3 | |
| 18. | "Crying in the Chapel" | Peter Blakeley | 3 | |
| 19. | "Janie's Got a Gun" | Aerosmith | 1 | 1 |
| 20. | "Blaze of Glory" | Jon Bon Jovi | 1 | 6 |
| 21. | "When I See You Smile" | Bad English | 4 | |
| 22. | "Epic" | Faith No More | 1 | 3 |
| 23. | "Lay Down Your Guns" | Jimmy Barnes | 4 | |
| 24. | "Lambada" | Kaoma | 5 | |
| 25. | "Show No Mercy" | Mark Williams | 8 | |
| 26. | "Infinity (1990's Time for the Guru)" | Guru Josh | 4 | |
| 27. | "Pump Up the Jam | Technotronic feat. Felly | 4 | |
| 28. | "Hanky Panky" | Madonna | 6 | |
| 29. | "Spin That Wheel" | Hi-Tek 3 | 5 | |
| 30. | "Jukebox in Siberia" | Skyhooks | 1 | 2 |
| 31. | "I Don't Want to Be with Nobody but You" | Absent Friends | 4 | |
| 32. | "Love Will Lead You Back" | Taylor Dayne | 11 | |
| 33. | "Step by Step" | New Kids on the Block | 8 | |
| 34. | "Ice Ice Baby" | Vanilla Ice | 1 | 3 |
| 35. | "Blue Sky Mine" | Midnight Oil | 8 | |
| 36. | "Close to You" | Maxi Priest | 2 | |
| 37. | "I Want That Man" | Deborah Harry | 2 | |
| 38. | "Groove Is in the Heart" | Deee-Lite | 1 | 1 |
| 39. | "Dangerous" | Roxette | 9 | |
| 40. | "Summer Rain" | Belinda Carlisle | 6 | |
| 41. | "How Can We Be Lovers?" | Michael Bolton | 3 | |
| 42. | "Suicide Blonde" | INXS | 2 | |
| 43. | "Thunderstruck" | AC/DC | 4 | |
| 44. | "Chain Reaction" | John Farnham | 6 | |
| 45. | "Unskinny Bop" | Poison | 7 | |
| 46. | "Blame It on the Rain" | Milli Vanilli | 5 | |
| 47. | "Sacrifice" | Elton John | 7 | |
| 48. | "Cradle of Love" | Billy Idol | 10 | |
| 49. | "I Don't Know Anybody Else" | Black Box | 6 | |
| 50. | "Bust a Move" | Young MC | 1 | 1 |
| 51. | "Leave a Light On" | Belinda Carlisle | 5 | |
| 52. | "Love Is" | Alannah Myles | 12 | |
| 53. | "Ooops Up" | Snap! | 4 | |
| 54. | "Love and Kisses" | Dannii | 4 | |
| 55. | "Better the Devil You Know" | Kylie Minogue | 4 | |
| 56. | "Heart in Danger" | Southern Sons | 5 | |
| 57. | "I'll Be Your Shelter" | Taylor Dayne | 4 | |
| 58. | "I Remember You" | Skid Row | 12 | |
| 59. | "The Right Combination" | Seiko & Donnie Wahlberg | 11 | |
| 60. | "Lily Was Here" | David A. Stewart feat. Candy Dulfer | 10 | |
| 61. | "Doin' the Do" | Betty Boo | 3 | |
| 62. | "King of Wishful Thinking" | Go West | 6 | |
| 63. | "Sweet Surrender" | Wet Wet Wet | 7 | |
| 64. | "Dogs Are Talking" | The Angels | 11 | |
| 65. | "The Power" | Snap! | 13 | |
| 66. | "Vision of Love" | Mariah Carey | 9 | |
| 67. | "Show Me Heaven" | Maria McKee | 3 | |
| 68. | "Roam" | The B-52's | 11 | |
| 69. | "Baby Don't Forget My Number" | Milli Vanilli | 17 | |
| 70. | "That's Freedom" | John Farnham | 6 | |
| 71. | "Italo House Mix" | Rococo | 13 | |
| 72. | "Turtle Power!" | Partners in Kryme | 15 | |
| 73. | "Bound for Glory" | Angry Anderson | 11 | |
| 74. | "Black Betty" (Rough 'n' Ready Remix) | Ram Jam | 17 | |
| 75. | "Black Cat" | Janet Jackson | 6 | |
| 76. | "Still Got the Blues (For You)" | Gary Moore | 18 | |
| 77. | "I'm Your Baby Tonight" | Whitney Houston | 7 | |
| 78. | "Let's Make It Last All Night" | Jimmy Barnes | 12 | |
| 79. | "Escaping" | Margaret Urlich | 17 | |
| 80. | "Dub Be Good to Me" | Beats International | 12 | |
| 81. | "Shake" | Andrew Ridgeley | 16 | |
| 82. | "Burn for You" | John Farnham | 5 | |
| 83. | "Tonight" | New Kids on the Block | 16 | |
| 84. | "Megamix" | Technotronic | 13 | |
| 85. | "I Feel the Earth Move" | Martika | 2 | |
| 86. | "Here We Are" | Gloria Estefan | 20 | |
| 87. | "Please Send Me Someone to Love" | Johnny Diesel and the Injectors | 11 | |
| 88. | "Miss Divine" | Icehouse | 16 | |
| 89. | "Tom's Diner" | DNA feat. Suzanne Vega | 8 | |
| 90. | "Back Street Pickup" | The Angels | 23 | |
| 91. | "Step Back in Time" | Kylie Minogue | 5 | |
| 92. | "Check Out the Chicken" | Grandmaster Chicken & D.J. Duck | 16 | |
| 93. | "Fools Gold" | The Stone Roses | 13 | |
| 94. | "I Wish It Would Rain Down" | Phil Collins | 15 | |
| 95. | "Praying for Time" | George Michael | 16 | |
| 96. | "Tell Me a Story" | 1927 | 17 | |
| 97. | "Let the Night Roll On" | The Angels | 17 | |
| 98. | "Thieves in the Temple" | Prince | 16 | |
| 99. | "(Can't Live Without Your) Love and Affection" | Nelson | 20 | |
| 100. | "Escapade" | Janet Jackson | 25 | |

Peak chart positions are from the ARIA Charts, overall position on the End of Year Chart is calculated by ARIA based on the number of weeks and position that the records reach within the Top 50 singles for each week during 1990.
