= List of top 25 albums for 1991 in Australia =

Top 25 albums of 1991 < 1990 1992 >

Other Australian top charts for 1991
- top 25 singles
- Triple J Hottest 100

Australian number-one charts of 1991
- albums
- singles

These are the top 25 albums of 1991 in Australia from the Australian Recording Industry Association (ARIA) End of Year Albums Chart.

#	Title	Artist	Highest pos. reached	Weeks at No. 1
1.	Rise	Daryl Braithwaite	3	
2.	Vagabond Heart	Rod Stewart	1	1
3.	Greatest Hits	Eurythmics	1	7
4.	Unforgettable... with Love	Natalie Cole	1	6
5.	Two Fires	Jimmy Barnes	1	5 (Note: Two Fires peaked at #1 in September 1990 on the ARIA chart for four weeks and was still in the Top 50 during most of 1991, it returned to #1 for one week in June.)
6.	Mariah Carey	Mariah Carey	6	
7.	In Concert	The Three Tenors	1	2 (Note: In Concert peaked at #1 in 1990 on the ARIA chart for two weeks and was still in the Top 50 until October 1991, it returned for one week in January 1992.)
8.	The Immaculate Collection	Madonna	1	5 (Note: The Immaculate Collection peaked at #1 in December 1990 on the ARIA chart for three weeks, it returned to #1 for two weeks in mid-January and was still in the Top 50 until November 1991. it returned Top 50 later in 1992 and again in 1993, 1994 and 1995.)
9.	Grease	Motion Picture Soundtrack	1	13 (Note: Grease peaked at #1 in 1978 on the Kent Music Report for nine weeks. It appeared on the ARIA chart from May 1991 and peaked at #1 for three weeks, it returned to #1 for one week in August 1998.)
10.	Joyride	Roxette	2	
11.	The Very Best of Elton John	Elton John	1	1 (Note: The Very Best of Elton John first entered the ARIA charts in November 1990 and peaked at #1 in January 1991 for one week. It was continuously in the Top 50 until May 1991, it returned later in 1991 and again in 1992, 1993, 1997, 1998 and 2002. Its total time in the Top 50 was 51 weeks.)
12.	Out of Time	R.E.M.	4	
13.	Rhythm Nation 1814	Janet Jackson	1	4 (Note: Rhythm Nation 1814 first entered the ARIA charts in October 1989, it left the Top 50 in December. It returned to the Top 50 in September 1990 and peaked at #1 in early 1991 for four weeks. Its total time in the Top 50 was 41 weeks.)
14.	Souvenir: The Ultimate Collection	Billy Joel	1	1
15.	Twin Peaks	Soundtrack	1	1
16.	Dreamland	Black Box	1	3 (Note: Dreamland first entered the ARIA charts in May 1990, it left the Top 50 in July. It returned to the Top 50 in February 1991 and peaked at #1 in March 1991 for three weeks. Its total time in the Top 50 was 34 weeks.)
17.	Gonna Make You Sweat	C & C Music Factory	7	
18.	Use Your Illusion II	Guns N' Roses	1	3 (Note: Use Your Illusion II debuted on the ARIA charts at #1 in September 1991 and remained at the top spot for three weeks. It left the Top 50 in May 1992, but returned in September and remained until May 1993. Its total time in the Top 50 was 62 weeks.)
19.	Chain Reaction	John Farnham	1	5 (Note: Chain Reaction debuted on the ARIA charts at #1 in October 1990 and was at the top spot for a total of five weeks. It remained in the Top 50 during 1991 until June for a total time of 36 weeks.)
20.	Home	Hothouse Flowers	1	1
21.	Harley and Rose	The Black Sorrows	3	
22.	Southern Sons	Southern Sons	5	
23.	Waking Up the Neighbours	Bryan Adams	1	4
24.	House of Hope	Toni Childs	4	
25.	On Every Street	Dire Straits	1	1
26.	MCMXC a.D.	Enigma	2	
27.	Serious Hits... Live!	Phil Collins	5	
28.	Metallica	Metallica	1	1
29.	Achtung Baby	U2	1	1
30.	Into the Light	Gloria Estefan	9	
31.	Listen Without Prejudice Vol. 1	George Michael	5	
32.	Use Your Illusion I	Guns N' Roses	2	
33.	Soul Deep	Jimmy Barnes	1	3
34.	Wicked Game	Chris Isaak	8	
35.	Blind Love	Ratcat	1	3
36.	Some People's Lives	Bette Midler	7	
37.	Mama Said	Lenny Kravitz	10	
38.	The Commitments	Soundtrack	2	
39.	X	INXS	1	2 (Note: X debuted on the ARIA charts at #1 in October 1990 and remained at the top spot for two weeks. It left the Top 50 in June 1991. Its total time in the Top 50 was 34 weeks.)
40.	Woodface	Crowded House	2	
41.	The Razors Edge	AC/DC	3	
42.	Love Versus Money	Noiseworks	1	1
43.	Phantom of the Opera	Soundtrack	2 (Note: Phantom of the Opera first entered the ARIA charts in September 1988 and peaked at #1 in May 1989 for one week. It remained in the Top 50 for a total time of 81 weeks, including 24 weeks in 1991 and 10 returning weeks.)	
44.	Émigré	Wendy Matthews	11	
45.	Chisel	Cold Chisel	3	
46.	Kinky	Hoodoo Gurus	4	
47.	Dangerous	Michael Jackson	1	4 (Note: Dangerous peaked at #1 in December 1991 and remained in the top position until January 1992. It left the Top 50 in October 1992, returning for one week in November 1992, 28 weeks in March 1993, and 6 weeks in July 2009 after Jackson's passing. This marks a total of 81 weeks in the Top 50.)
48.	All for One	The Screaming Jets	2	
49.	Divinyls	Divinyls	5	
50.	Bat Out of Hell	Meat Loaf	4	

Peak chart positions from 1991 are from the ARIA Charts, overall position on the End of Year Chart is calculated by ARIA based on the number of weeks and position that the records reach within the Top 50 albums for each week during 1991.
