= List of artists who reached number one on the Australian singles chart =

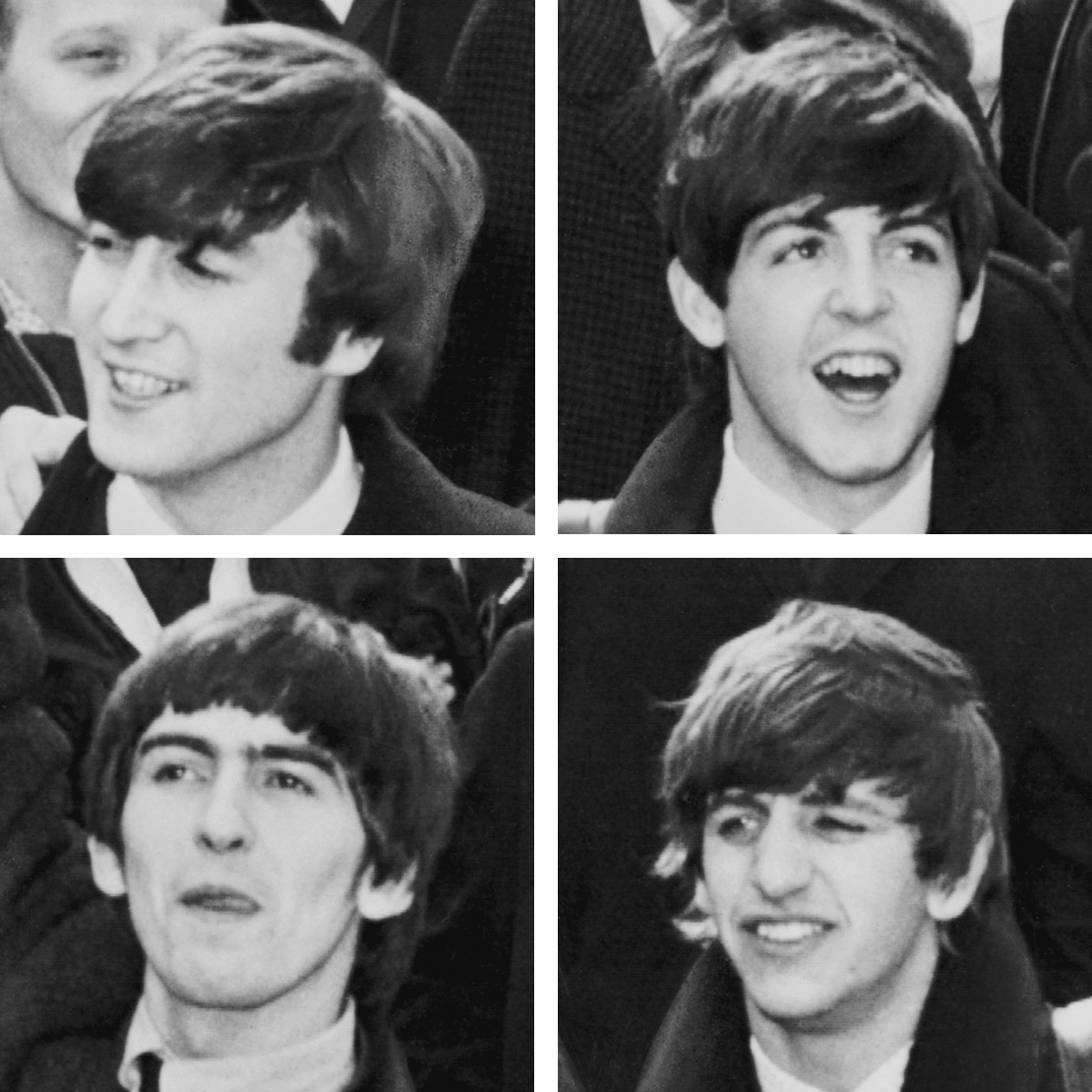
The Beatles scored 26 number-one hits in Australia, more than any other artist.

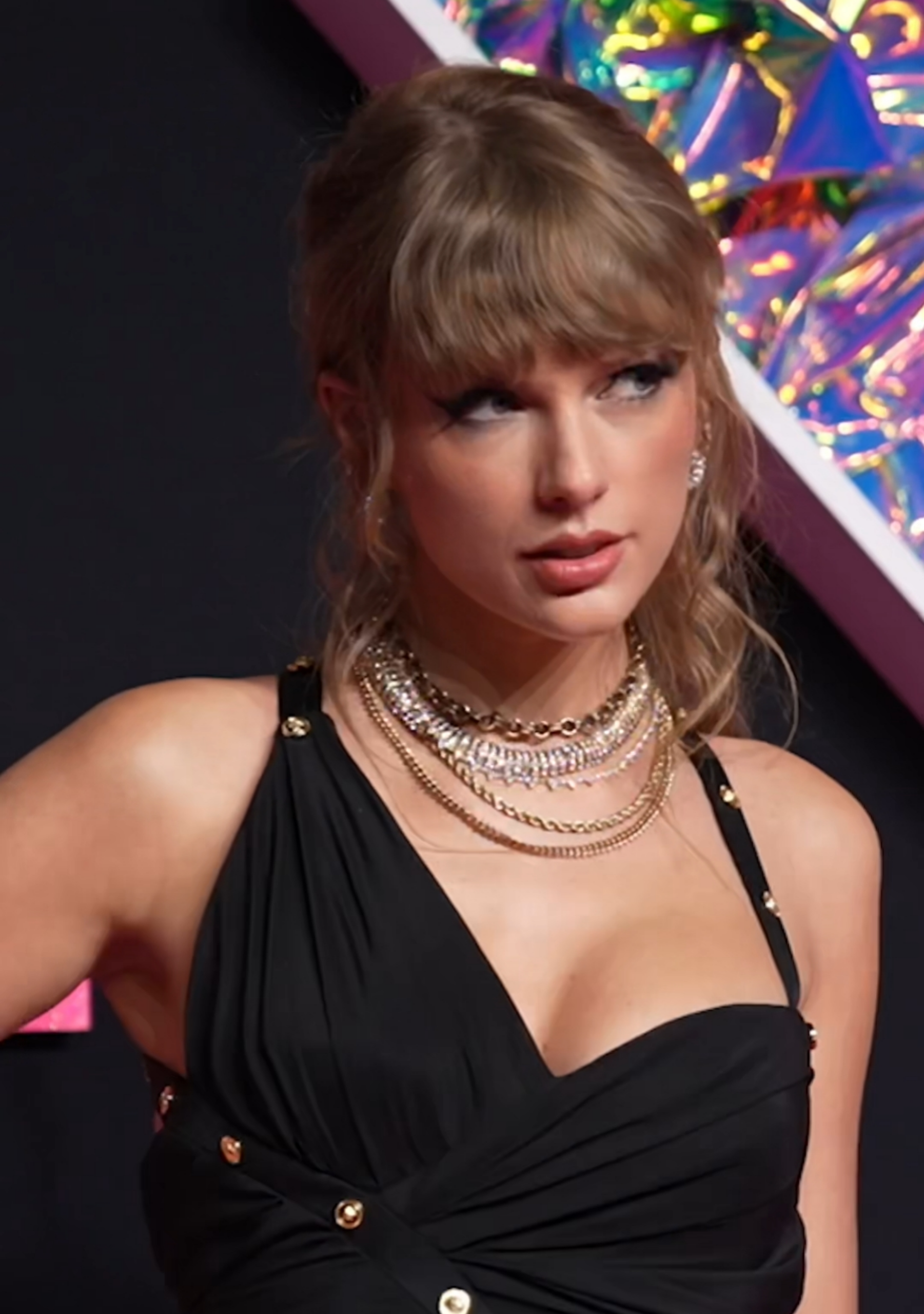
Taylor Swift holds the record for the most number-one songs by a solo artist and female artist with 15.

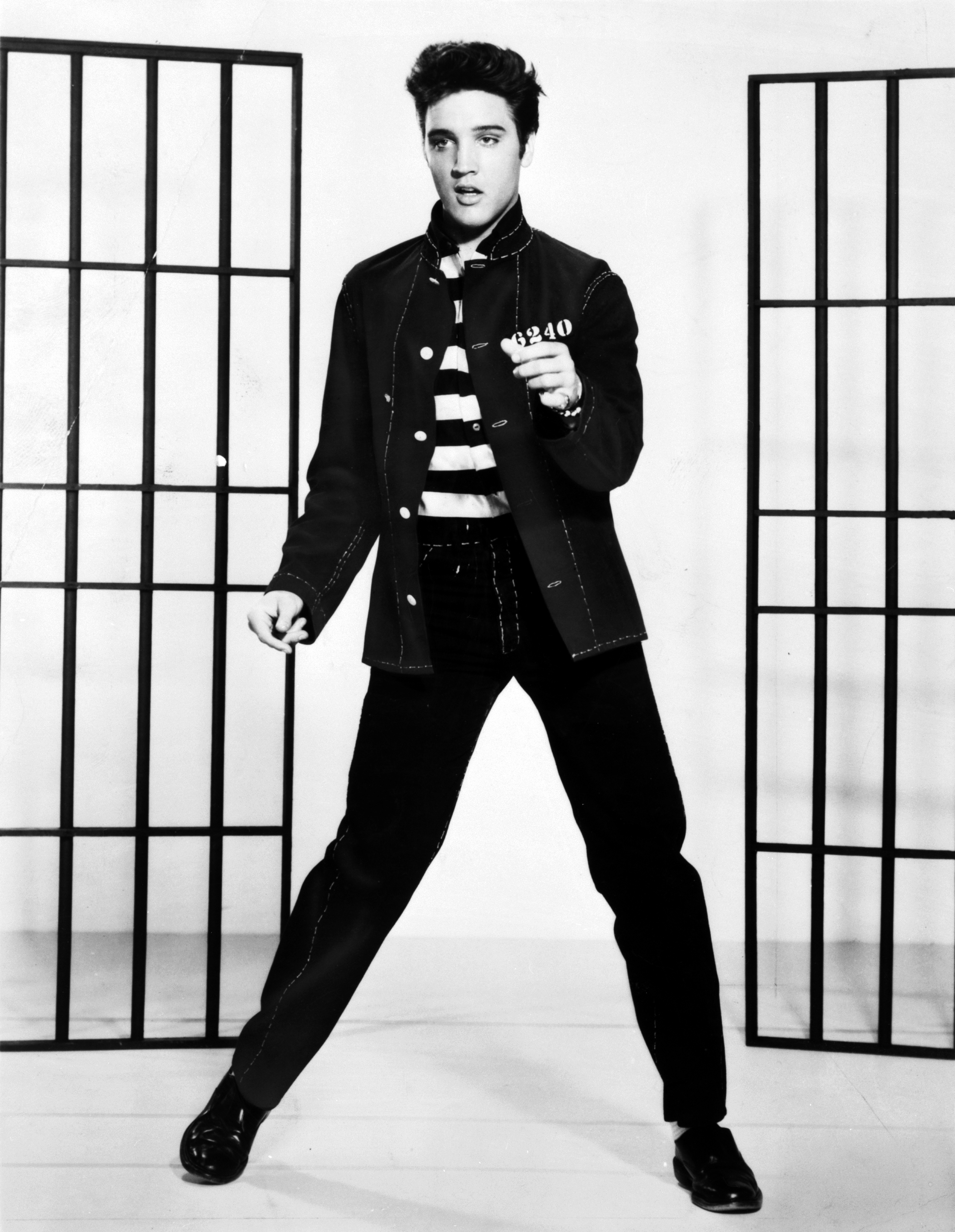
Elvis Presley also holds the record for the most number-one songs by a solo artist tying with Taylor Swift and a male artist with 14.

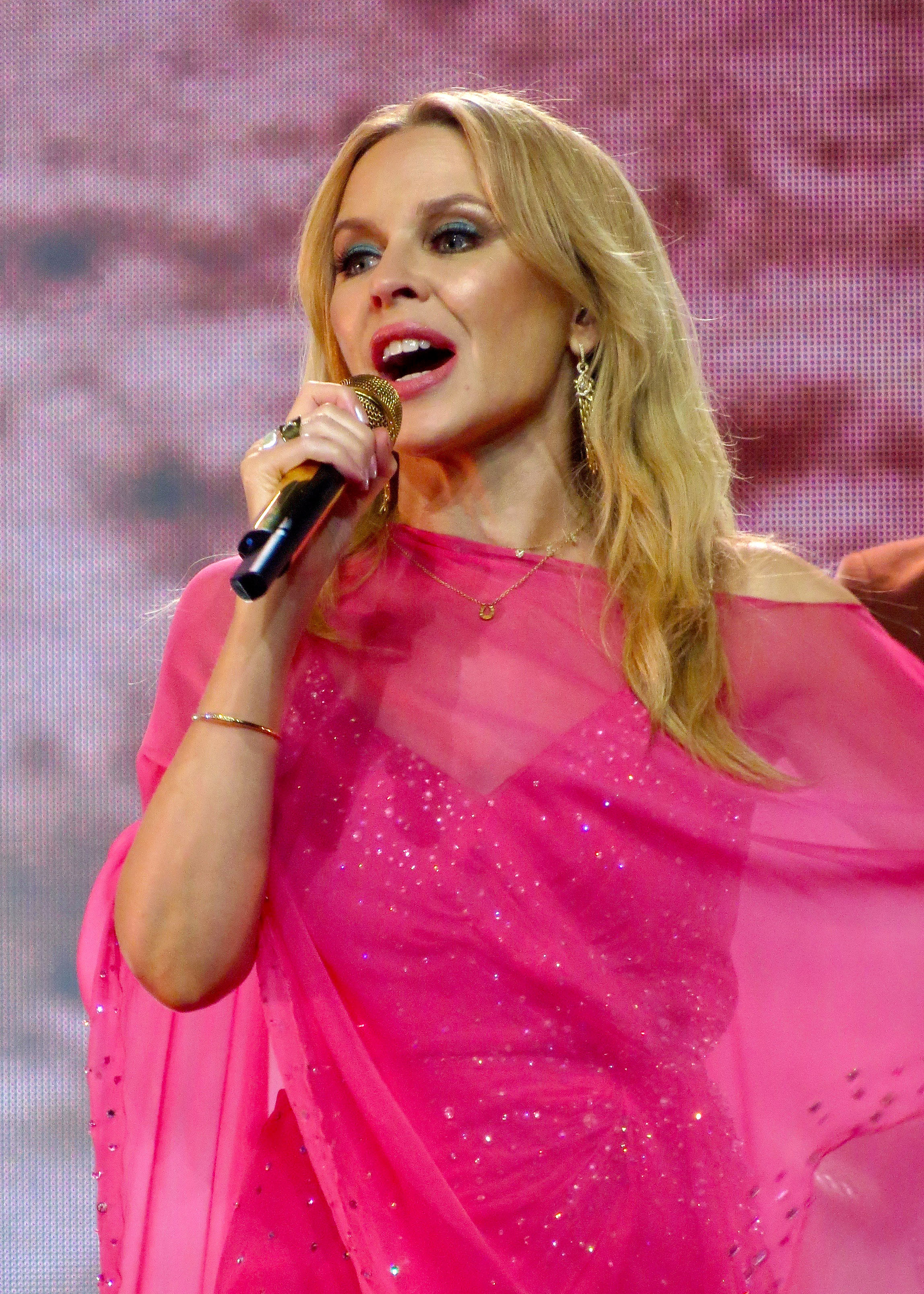
Kylie Minogue holds the record for the most number-one songs by an Australian artist with 10.

This is a list of recording artists who have reached number one on Australia's singles chart since 1956.

Artists who reached number one on either or both the Australian Music Report (AMR) and Australian Record Industry Association (ARIA) singles charts are included here.

- All acts are listed alphabetically.
- Solo artists are alphabetized by last name, Groups by group name excluding "A", "An", and "The".
- Each act's total of number-one singles is shown after their name.
- All artists who are mentioned in song credits are listed here; this includes one-time pairings of otherwise solo artists and those appearing as featured (for example, both Delta Goodrem and Brian McFadden get a credit for "Almost Here").
- Artists associated with a group who reached number one, yet have their own solo page in Wikipedia, are not listed here unless they hit number one as a solo artist.

== 0-9 ==
- 112 (1)
- 2 Chainz (1)
- 2Pac (1)
- 5 Seconds of Summer (2)
- The 5th Dimension (1)
- 12th Man/The Twelfth Man (2)
- 21 Savage (1)
- 24kGoldn (1)
- 50 Cent (1)

== A ==
- ABBA (6)
- Paula Abdul (1)
- Gracie Abrams (1)
- Ace of Base (2)
- Adam and the Ants (1)
- Bryan Adams (4)
- Adele (3)
- Aerosmith (2)
- Christina Aguilera (3)
- Afroman (1)
- a-ha (1)
- Akon (2)
- Alien Ant Farm (1)
- Peter Allen (1)
- All-4-One (1)
- All Saints (1)
- Herb Alpert (1)
- Vanessa Amorosi (1)
- Anastacia (2)
- Lynn Anderson (1)
- The Animals (1)
- Paul Anka (1)
- Anne-Marie (1)
- Adam Ant (1)
- Aqua (2)
- James Arthur (1)
- Jann Arden (1)
- Louis Armstrong (2)
- Rick Astley (1)
- The Atlantics (1)
- Australian Crawl (1)
- Australian Idol Final 12 (1)
- Avicii (1)

== B ==
- The Babys (1)
- Backstreet Boys (1)
- Baha Men (1)
- Merril Bainbridge (1)
- Bananarama (1)
- Band Aid (1)
- The Bangles (2)
- Chris Barber's Jazz Band (1)
- Bardot (1)
- Jimmy Barnes (1)
- Toni Basil (1)
- Shirley Bassey (1)
- The Bay City Rollers (1)
- Carole Bayer Sager (1)
- Les Baxter (1)
- The Beach Boys (3)
- The Beatles (26)
- Bee Gees (2)
- Lou Bega (1)
- Pat Benatar (1)
- Bent Fabric (1)
- Beyoncé (2)
- The B-52's (1)
- Justin Bieber (9)
- Big Audio Dynamite (1)
- Cilla Black (1)
- The Black Eyed Peas (8)
- Blackfeather (1)
- Blackpink (1)
- Blondie (1)
- Bob The Builder (1)
- Bobby and Laurie (1)
- Bomfunk MC's (1)
- The Boomtown Rats (1)
- Grahame Bond (1)
- Boney M (2)
- Jon Bon Jovi (1)
- Benson Boone (1)
- Pat Boone (2)
- David Bowie (2)
- Boyz II Men (2)
- Daryl Braithwaite (2)
- Laura Branigan (1)
- Olivia O'Brien (1)
- Sarah Brightman (1)
- Bobby Brown (1)
- Chris Brown (2)
- Ray Brown & The Whispers (2)
- Lindsey Buckingham (1)
- The Buggles (1)
- Rocky Burnette (1)
- Kate Bush (2)
- B*Witched (1)

== C ==
- Daniel Caesar (1)
- Cardi B (1)
- Colbie Caillat (1)
- Scott Cain (1)
- Anthony Callea (2)
- Camila Cabello (2)
- The Captain and Tennille (1)
- Irene Cara (1)
- Mariah Carey (3)
- Vanessa Carlton (1)
- Kim Carnes (1)
- Sabrina Carpenter (3)
- The Carpenters (3)
- Jo "Fingers" Carr (1)
- Vikki Carr (1)
- Wes Carr (1)
- José Carreras (1)
- David Cassidy (1)
- Doja Cat (1)
- The Chainsmokers (1)
- Kasey Chambers (1)
- Central Cee (1)
- The Chantays (1)
- Charlene (1)
- Ray Charles (1)
- Chance the Rapper (1)
- Cheap Trick (1)
- Cher (2)
- Chic (1)
- Chicago (1)
- Chumbawamba (1)
- Gabriella Cilmi (1)
- Petula Clark (4)
- Kelly Clarkson (1)
- Clean Bandit (1)
- Rosemary Clooney (1)
- Joe Cocker (1)
- Nat "King" Cole (1)
- Ray Columbus & The Invaders (1)
- Commodores (1)
- Perry Como (3)
- Coolio (1)
- Bradley Cooper (1)
- Cosima (1)
- Julie Covington (1)
- Billy "Crash" Craddock (2)
- The Cranberries (1)
- Crash Test Dummies (1)
- Crazy Frog (1)
- Creedence Clearwater Revival (2)
- Bing Crosby (1)
- Sheryl Crow (1)
- The Crystals (1)
- Culture Beat (1)
- Culture Club (2)
- Cut 'N' Move (1)
- C.W. McCall (1)
- Billy Ray Cyrus (1)
- Miley Cyrus (1)

== D ==
- DaBaby (1)
- Sonia Dada (1)
- Daddy Cool (1)
- Puff Daddy (1)
- Daft Punk (1)
- Dakota (1)
- Bobby Darin (1)
- James Darren (1)
- Dave (1)
- Bryan Davies (1)
- Dawn (2)
- Doris Day (1)
- Olivia Dean (2)
- Kate DeAraugo (1)
- Kiki Dee (1)
- Deee-Lite (1)
- Jason Derulo (4)
- Destiny's Child (1)
- Dexys Midnight Runners (1)
- D-12 (1)
- Devo (1)
- Jim Diamond (1)
- Dido (2)
- Dimples D. (1)
- Dion (1)
- Celine Dion (3)
- Iann Dior (1)
- One Direction (1)
- Disciples (1)
- Divinyls (1)
- Doechii (1)
- Dave Dobbyn (1)
- Lonnie Donegan (1)
- Casey Donovan (1)
- Carl Douglas (1)
- Dragon (1)
- Drake (4)
- Charlie Drake (1)
- Dr Hook (2)
- The Drifters (1)
- Drummond (1)
- Ricardo "RikRok" Ducent (1)
- Slim Dusty (2)
- Dami Im (1)

== E ==
- Eamon (1)
- East 17 (1)
- Sheena Easton (1)
- The Easybeats (3)
- Tommy Edwards (1)
- Eiffel 65 (1)
- Billie Eilish (4)
- Ellie Goulding (1)
- Eminem (9)
- Eruption (1)
- Euphoria (2)
- Eurythmics (1)
- Evanescence (1)
- Faith Evans (1)
- Eve (1)
- Evermore (1)
- Everly Brothers (1)
- Exile (1)
- George Ezra (1)

== F ==
- Fairground Attraction (1)
- Paloma Faith (1)
- Faith No More (2)
- John "Johnny" Farnham (4)
- Sam Fender (1)
- Freddie Fender (1)
- Fergie (1)
- Bryan Ferry (1)
- Fine Young Cannibals (1)
- Eddie Fisher (1)
- Toni Fisher (1)
- Roberta Flack (2)
- Flo Rida (4)
- A Flock of Seagulls (1)
- Flume (1)
- Luis Fonsi (1)
- Emile Ford (1)
- Tennessee Ernie Ford (1)
- Foreigner (1)
- Foster the People (1)
- The Four Seasons (2)
- Fox (1)
- Samantha Fox (1)
- Jamie Foxx (1)
- Connie Francis (1)
- Frankee (1)
- Aretha Franklin (1)
- Chris Franklin (1)
- The Fray (1)
- Lost Frequencies (1)
- The Fugees (1)
- Fun. (2)

== G ==
- Lady Gaga (4)
- Boris Gardiner (1)
- Dschinghis Khan (1)
- Andy Gibb (1)
- Girlfriend/gf4 (1)
- The J. Geils Band (1)
- Thomas Gergich (1)
- Bobbie Gentry (1)
- Gerry & The Pacemakers (2)
- Terry Gilkyson & the Easy Riders (1)
- Giveon (1)
- Glass Animals (1)
- Jimmy Gilmer & the Fireballs (1)
- Gary Glitter (1)
- Goleo VI (1)
- Childish Gambino (1)
- Gnash (1)
- Grace (1)
- Bobby Goldsboro (1)
- Delta Goodrem (9)
- Goo Goo Dolls (1)
- Lesley Gore (1)
- Gotye (1)
- Ellie Goulding (1)
- Ariana Grande (4)
- Macy Gray (1)
- A Great Big World (1)
- Green Day (1)
- Norman Greenbaum (1)
- David Guetta (3)
- Gym Class Heroes (1)

== H ==
- Bill Haley (1)
- Halsey (1)
- Hanson (1)
- Lee Harding (1)
- Jack Harlow (2)
- Calvin Harris (2)
- Richard Harris (1)
- Rolf Harris (1)
- George Harrison (2)
- Murray Head (1)
- Heart (1)
- Taylor Henderson (1)
- Herbs (1)
- Herman's Hermits (2)
- Patrick Hernandez (1)
- Al Hibbler (1)
- Missy Higgins (2)
- Benny Hill (1)
- Hinder (1)
- Hocus Pocus (1)
- Eddie Hodges (1)
- The Hollies (1)
- The Honeycombs (1)
- Johnny Horton (1)
- Whitney Houston (3)
- Hot Butter (1)
- Hozier (1)
- Bob Hudson (1)
- Engelbert Humperdinck (1)
- Tab Hunter (1)
- Huntrix (1)
- Brian Hyland (1)
- Chrissie Hynde (1)

== I ==
- Icehouse (1)
- Frank Ifield (1)
- Enrique Iglesias (1)
- Dami Im (1)
- INXS (1)
- The Irish Rovers (1)
- Burl Ives (1)
- Iyaz (1)

== J ==
- Terry Jacks (1)
- Janet Jackson (1)
- Michael Jackson (4)
- Mick Jagger (1)
- Jamelia (1)
- Jan & Dean (1)
- Horst Jankowski (1)
- Jawsh 685 (1)
- Jay-Z (1)
- Jazzy Jeff (1)
- Carly Rae Jepsen (1)
- Joan Jett and the Blackhearts (1)
- Saint Jhn (1)
- Jive Bunny and the Mastermixers (1)
- Joe Dolce Music Theatre (1)
- Billy Joel (2)
- Elton John (6)
- Joji (1)
- Jonas Blue (1)
- Jonas Brothers (1)
- Jimmy Jones (1)
- Tom Jones (2)
- Janis Joplin (1)
- The Joy Boys (1)
- Col Joye (1)
- Col Joye & The Joy Boys (1)
- Justice Crew (2)
- Bill Justis (1)
- JXL (1)

== K ==
- Kai (1)
- Kalin Twins (1)
- Noah Kahan (1)
- Katseye (1)
- Katy Perry (4)
- KC and the Sunshine Band (1)
- K-Ci & JoJo (1)
- R. Kelly (1)
- Kesha (2)
- DJ Khaled (1)
- The Kid Laroi (2)
- Killing Heidi (1)
- Kimbra (1)
- Claude King (1)
- Kingston Trio (1)
- Kathy Kirby (1)
- Kid Rock (1)
- Wiz Khalifa (1)
- The Knack (1)
- Lenny Kravitz (1)
- Kris Kross (1)
- Kyla (1)

== L ==
- La Belle Epoque (1)
- Ella Langley (1)
- Las Ketchup (1)
- Cyndi Lauper (1)
- Avril Lavigne (2)
- Vicki Lawrence (1)
- Led Zeppelin (1)
- Swae Lee (1)
- John Legend (2)
- Damien Leith (1)
- Paul Lekakis (1)
- Kendrick Lamar (2)
- John Lennon (2)
- Julian Lennon (1)
- Dean Lewis (1)
- Huey Lewis (1)
- Huey Lewis and the News (1)
- Leona Lewis (1)
- LunchMoney Lewis (1)
- Lifehouse (1)
- Lighthouse Family (1)
- Lil' Kim (1)
- Lil Nas X (2)
- Lil Wayne (1)
- Bob Lind (1)
- Dua Lipa (1)
- Lipps Inc. (1)
- Jimmy Little (1)
- Little River Band (1)
- LMFAO (2)
- Lobo (1)
- Kenny Loggins (1)
- Laurie London (1)
- Londonbeat (1)
- Jennifer Lopez (2)
- Los Del Rio (1)
- Los Indios Tabajaras (1)
- Los Lobos (1)
- Jim Lowe (1)
- Lukas Graham (1)
- Lupe Fiasco (1)

== M ==
- MØ (2)
- M (1)
- Macklemore (4)
- Madison Avenue (1)
- Madonna (11)
- Zayn Malik (1)
- The Mamas & the Papas (1)
- The Madden Brothers (1)
- Major Lazer (1)
- Maroon 5 (1)
- Beau Marks (1)
- Major Lazer (2)
- Post Malone (5)
- Martika (1)
- Dean Martin (1)
- Ricky Martin (1)
- Johnny Mathis (1)
- Bruno Mars (4)
- Richard Marx (2)
- Jessica Mauboy (1)
- Paul Mauriat (1)
- Jesse McCartney (2)
- Paul McCartney (1)
- Paul McCoy (1)
- Brian McFadden (2)
- Bobby McFerrin (1)
- Maureen McGovern (1)
- Tim McGraw (1)
- Mary McGregor (1)
- Don McLean (1)
- MC Hammer (1)
- Tate McRae (1)
- MC Sar (1)
- Meat Loaf (1)
- The Medicine Show (1)
- Bill Medley (1)
- Mel and Kim (1)
- Melanie (1)
- Melissa (1)
- Shawn Mendes (1)
- Men at Work (1)
- Metallica (1)
- George Michael (5)
- Bette Midler (1)
- Midnight Oil (1)
- Mike + The Mechanics (1)
- Jamie Miller (1)
- Mitch Miller (1)
- Ned Miller (1)
- Millie (1)
- Nicki Minaj (1)
- Kylie Minogue (10)
- Mi-Sex (1)
- Guy Mitchell (1)
- The Mixtures (2)
- Models (1)
- The Modern Day Poets (1)
- Domenico Modugno (1)
- The Mojo Singers (1)
- The Monkees (1)
- Bob Moore (1)
- Russell Morris (2)
- Moving Pictures (1)
- Mr. Big (1)
- Ted Mulry Gang (1)
- Mungo Jerry (1)
- Musical Youth (1)
- Mýa (2)

== N ==
- Nelly (4)
- Ricky Nelson (1)
- Sandy Nelson (2)
- Nena (1)
- Jason Nevins (1)
- New Kids on the Block (1)
- Wayne Newton (1)
- Olivia Newton-John (5)
- Nilsson (1)
- Nitty (1)
- No Doubt (1)
- Shannon Noll (3)
- *NSYNC (1)
- N-Trance (1)

== O ==
- Oasis (1)
- Billy Ocean (2)
- Sinéad O'Connor (1)
- The Offspring (1)
- Johnny O'Keefe (2)
- Johnny O'Keefe and the Dee Jays (1)
- OMC (1)
- OMI (1)
- OneRepublic (1)
- Roy Orbison (6)
- Tony Orlando and Dawn (1)
- Joan Osborne (1)
- Donny Osmond (1)
- DJ Ötzi (1)
- OutKast (1)
- Owl City (1)

== P ==
- Jennifer Paige (1)
- Robert Palmer (2)
- Gwyneth Paltrow (1)
- Paper Lace (2)
- Ray Parker Jr. (1)
- Dolly Parton (1)
- The Partridge Family (1)
- The Party Boys (1)
- Passenger
- Paul & Paula (1)
- Sean Paul (1)
- Paulini (1)
- Pearl Jam (1)
- Peter & Gordon (1)
- Kim Petras (1)
- Édith Piaf (1)
- Pilot (1)
- Pink (9)
- Gene Pitney (1)
- The Platters (3)
- Brian Poole and the Tremeloes (1)
- Perez Prado (1)
- Elvis Presley (14)
- Billy Preston (1)
- Johnny Preston (1)
- Lloyd Price (1)
- Prince (2)
- The Proclaimers (1)
- Procol Harum (1)
- Pseudo Echo (1)
- Psy (1)
- Puff Daddy (1)
- The Pussycat Dolls (2)
- Pussyfoot (1)
- Charlie Puth (1)

== Q ==
- Suzi Quatro (3)
- Quavo (1)
- Queen (2)

== R ==
- Racey (2)
- Gerry Rafferty (1)
- Ratcat (2)
- Johnnie Ray (2)
- Rayvon (1)
- The Real McCoy (1)
- Helen Reddy (2)
- Redfoo (1)
- Redgum (1)
- Red Hot Chili Peppers (1)
- Bebe Rexha (1)
- Busta Rhymes (1)
- Roddy Ricch (1)
- Cliff Richard (2)
- Cliff Richard and the Shadows (2)
- Lionel Richie (3)
- Tommy Richman (1)
- Right Said Fred (1)
- The Righteous Brothers (1)
- Rihanna (10)
- LeAnn Rimes (1)
- Miguel Rios (1)
- Rob E.G. (2)
- Marty Robbins (1)
- Jimmie Rodgers (2)
- Olivia Rodrigo (6)
- Tommy Roe (1)
- Kenny Rogers (1)
- The Rolling Stones (3)
- Mark Ronson (1)
- Rosé (1)
- Diana Ross (3)
- Nino Rosso (1)
- Normie Rowe & The Playboys (1)
- Kelly Rowland (1)
- Royal Scots Dragoon Guards (1)
- The Royal Guardsmen (1)
- Roxette (3)
- Roxy Music (1)
- Run DMC (1)
- Jennifer Rush (1)
- Russ Millions (1)

== S ==
- Salt-N-Pepa (1)
- Peter Sarstedt (1)
- Savage Garden (2)
- Leo Sayer (1)
- Scandal'us (1)
- Scooter (1)
- Jack Scott (1)
- Seal (1)
- Seany B (1)
- The Searchers (1)
- Guy Sebastian (6)
- Harry Secombe (1)
- Neil Sedaka (2)
- The Seekers (2)
- Conrad Sewell (1)
- The Shadows (1)
- Shaboozey (1)
- Shaggy (3)
- William Shakespeare (1)
- Shakin' Stevens (2)
- Shakira (3)
- The Shangri-Las (1)
- Del Shannon (3)
- Helen Shapiro (2)
- Feargal Sharkey (1)
- Ed Sheeran (6)
- Sheppard (1)
- Sherbet (2)
- Shocking Blue (1)
- Sia (1)
- Silverchair (3)
- Carly Simon (1)
- Simon and Garfunkel (1)
- Simply Red (1)
- The Simpsons (1)
- Frank Sinatra (2)
- Nancy Sinatra (2)
- Sixpence None the Richer (1)
- Skyhooks (2)
- The Small Faces (1)
- Sam Smith (2)
- Will Smith/Fresh Prince (3)
- Snoop Dogg (3)
- Snow (1)
- Soft Cell (1)
- David Soul (1)
- Jordin Sparks (1)
- Britney Spears (6)
- The Spice Girls (1)
- Spiderbait (1)
- Spiller (1)
- Split Enz (1)
- Rick Springfield (1)
- The Springfields (1)
- Megan Thee Stallion (1)
- Alvin Stardust (1)
- Kay Starr (1)
- Lucky Starr (1)
- Ringo Starr (1)
- Stars on 45 (1)
- Starship (1)
- Tommy Steele (1)
- Gwen Stefani (2)
- Steps (1)
- The Steve Miller Band (1)
- Ray Stevens (1)
- Andy Stewart (1)
- Rod Stewart (3)
- Morris Stoloff (1)
- Lally Stott (1)
- Barbra Streisand (1)
- Jud Strunk (1)
- Harry Styles (2)
- Donna Summer (2)
- The Surfaris (1)
- Survivor (1)
- Billy Swan (1)
- Swedish House Mafia (1)
- Sweet (1)
- Taylor Swift (15)
- The Swingers (1)
- SZA (1)

== T ==
- T-Pain (1)
- T.I. (1)
- Take That (1)
- T.A.T.u. (1)
- Austen Tayshus (1)
- Tears for Fears (1)
- Robin Thicke (1)
- Sandi Thom (1)
- Billy Thorpe & the Aztecs (3)
- The Tijuana Brass (1)
- Timbaland (3)
- Justin Timberlake (4)
- Tion Wayne (1)
- TLC (1)
- Tones and I (1)
- Train (1)
- John Travolta (2)
- Meghan Trainor (2)
- Joel Turner (1)
- Tina Turner (2)
- TV Rock (1)
- Shania Twain (1)
- The Two-Man Band (1)
- Ty Dolla Sign (1)
- Bonnie Tyler (2)

== U ==
- UB40 (2)
- Ugly Kid Joe (1)
- Uncle Kracker (1)
- USA For Africa (1)
- Usher (2)
- U2 (5)

== V ==
- Holly Valance (1)
- Vanilla Fudge (1)
- Vanilla Ice (1)
- The Vapors (1)
- Bobby Vee (2)
- The Ventures (1)
- The Veronicas (3)
- Village People (2)

== W ==
- Morgan Wallen (2)
- Jennifer Warnes (2)
- Alex Warren (1)
- Dionne Warwick (1)
- Mary Wells (1)
- Kanye West (2)
- The Weeknd (1)
- Wet Wet Wet (1)
- Wham! (1)
- Wheatus (1)
- Kim Wilde (1)
- Pharrell Williams (3)
- Vanessa Williams (1)
- Wings (1)
- Wizkid (1)
- Stevie Wonder (1)
- Sheb Wooley (1)
- Stevie Wright (1)
- Mark Wynter (1)

== X ==
- Charli XCX (1)

== Y ==
- "Weird Al" Yankovic (1)
- Daddy Yankee (1)
- Johnny Young (1)
- Lola Young (1)
- Young M.C. (1)
- The Young Ones (1)
- Victor Young (1)
- Young Thug (1)
- Youth Group (1)

== Z ==
- Zager and Evans (1)

== See also ==
- Music of Australia
