= Radio Freedom (disambiguation) =

Radio Freedom is an apartheid-era African National Congress station.

Radio Freedom or Freedom Radio may also refer to:

- Kiwi Radio, in New Zealand, originally called Radio Freedom
- Radio Freedom (freedom.fr), on the Indian Ocean island of Réunion
- Freedom Radio, a 1941 British propaganda film
- AFN Iraq, the American Forces Network of radio stations in Iraq that were nicknamed Freedom Radio
- Radio Freedom (band), Australian dance band
