= I Will Never Leave You =

I Will Never Leave You may refer to:

- I Will Never Leave You (song), a 1992 song by Euphoria
- I Will Never Leave You (film), a 1948 Mexican drama film
