= I Will Never Leave You (song) =

Single by Euphoria

from the album Total Euphoria
- Released: (Australia) 30 November 1992
- Recorded: 1992
- Genre: Dance pop
- Length: 3:56
- Label: EMI (Australia)
- Songwriter: Andrew Klippel
- Producers: Andrew Klippel, Ean Sugarman

Euphoria singles chronology
"Do for You/I Want It" (1991)	"I Will Never Leave You" (1992)	"Elated" (1993)

"I Will Never Leave You" is a 1992 song recorded by the Australian act Euphoria. The track was released in November 1992 as the fourth and final single from their debut studio album, Total Euphoria. The track peaked at number 41 on the ARIA Charts. It would also be the group's last top 50 charting single in Australia, and member Holly Garnett's final performance with the group. Garnett was replaced by Jodie Meares, who appeared in the music video for the song, and whose brief membership in the group would end with the act breaking up in 1993.

== Track listing ==
Australian CD Single:

1. "I Will Never Leave You" (3:56)
2. "Do for You" (US Ultimix 12") (6:55)
3. "Love You Right" (UK Gat Decor 12") (6:59)

== Charts ==
Chart (1993)	Peak position
Australia (ARIA)	41
