= My Little Angel (William Shakespeare song) =

Single by William Shakespeare
- Released: 1974
- Length: 3:26
- Label: Albert Records
- Songwriters: Harry Vanda; George Young

William Shakespeare singles chronology
"Can't Stop Myself from Loving You" (1974)	"My Little Angel" (1974)	"Just the Way You Are" (1975)

"My Little Angel" is a song written by ex-Easybeats members Harry Vanda and George Young in 1974 and was recorded by Johnny Cabe, aka stage act William Shakespeare. It was Shakespeare's second big hit in Australia and his first number one, making the number-one spot in Australia for three weeks in early 1975.

== Reception ==
Cash Box magazine said "This tune is part rap and part singing, a story to a young girl (a daughter), reassuring her that everybody has a guardian angel. Why? Because she's his. Could pick off some AM pop play if given half a chance."

== Charts ==
=== Weekly charts ===
Chart (1974/75)	Peak position
Australia (Kent Music Report)	1

=== Year-end charts ===
Chart (1975)	Position
Australia (Kent Music Report)	14

== See also ==
- List of number-one singles in Australia during the 1970s
