= Can't Stop Myself from Loving You =

"Can't Stop Myself From Loving You"

Single by William Shakespeare
- Released: 1974
- Label: Albert Records
- Songwriters: Harry Vanda & George Young

William Shakespeare singles chronology
"Can't Stop Myself From Loving You" (1974)	"My Little Angel" (1975)

"Can't Stop Myself From Loving You" was a song written by ex-Easybeats members Harry Vanda & George Young in 1974. Vanda and Young finished the backing track for the song and cast around for a singer, choosing local performer Johnny Cave, to record and release the track under the name William Shakespeare. It was Shakespeare's first hit in Australia, making the number 2 spot on the Australian charts. The song was largely aimed at the teenybopper market.

Shakespeare's follow up hit "My Little Angel" was an even bigger hit, reaching number one in early 1975.

== Charts ==
=== Weekly charts ===
Chart (1974/75)	Peak position
Australia (Kent Music Report)	2

=== Year-end charts ===
Chart (1974)	Peak position
Australia (Kent Music Report)	7

== Cover versions ==
A cover version of "Can't Stop Myself From Loving You" by the Ottawa band Octavian reached number 65 on the Canadian charts in 1977.
