= William Shakespeare (Australian singer) =

Australian glam rock singer

- Also known as: Johnny Cabe, Billy Shake
- Born: John Stanley Cave; 19 November 1948
- Origin: Sydney, Australia
- Died: 5 October 2010 (aged 61)
- Genres: Glam; pop
- Occupation: Singer
- Instrument: Vocals
- Years active: 1966–1993
- Label: Albert
- Formerly of: The Amazons

William Shakespeare (19 November 1948 – 5 October 2010) was the stage name of Australian glam rock singer, born as John Stanley Cave, also known as John Cabe or Billy Shake. He had two Australian hit singles, "Can't Stop Myself from Loving You", which peaked at No. 2 on the Kent Music Report in 1974, and "My Little Angel", which peaked at No. 1 in 1975. Both hits were written by Vanda & Young, who also turned Shakespeare into a glam rocker. After decades of alcohol addiction and clinical depression he became destitute; he was assisted by music industry benevolent society, Support Act, from 2001. He died suddenly in October 2010, aged 61.

== Early life ==
Shakespeare was born as John Stanley Cave in 1948 and grew up in Dulwich Hill, New South Wales. He was the only son of Stanley John Cave (ca. 1922–1962), a greengrocer, and Elizabeth May (née Thursfield, died 1971). The Cave family lived in Dulwich Hill for most of his early life.

He was vocalist for beat music group, the Amazons, with Nick Barlow on guitar, Harry Brus on bass guitar, Chris Carroll on guitar and Dally Carroll on drums. In 1966, they released a single, "Ain't that Lovin' You Baby". After The Amazons, Shakespeare continued performing in Sydney clubs as Johnny Cabe.

== Career ==
In early 1974, Shakespeare was in Albert Studios where producers and songwriters, Vanda & Young (ex-The Easybeats), were trying to record "Can't Stop Myself from Loving You", however, the singer they were working with was unable to reach its high notes. Shakespeare's falsetto voice was suitable and Vanda & Young used him to finish recording the track; they also signed him to Albert Productions and groomed him into William Shakespeare as a glam rocker along the lines of Alvin Stardust or Gary Glitter. According to ABC-TV series, Long Way to the Top (2001), he was one of three contenders for lead vocalist of AC/DC. However this was refuted by both of that group's founders, Angus and Malcolm Young.

"Can't Stop Myself from Loving You" was released as a single in July 1974 and peaked at No. 2 nationally (No. 1 in Sydney and Melbourne) on the Kent Music Report singles chart. Also in that year, during the planning stages for the ABC-TV series, Countdown, it was suggested that Shakespeare host the show. However, it was decided that guest hosts including Shirley Strachan, John Paul Young and Daryl Braithwaite compere the show on an ad hoc basis instead. Ian Meldrum, the show's talent co-ordinator, was also a frequent presence.

In November 1974, Shakespeare released his debut album, Can't Stop Myself from Loving You, produced by Vanda & Young for Albert Productions. All but one track was co-written by Vanda & Young. One track, "Time", was co-written by Shakespeare with Chris Gilbey, A&R manager at Alberts. The album peaked in the top 30 on the Kent Music Report albums chart.

His second single, "My Little Angel", followed in December and peaked at No. 1 on the Kent Music Report for three weeks in February of the next year and he became a national pop star. Shakespeare appeared on the teen-oriented musical program, Countdown, in his glam rock costume numerous times. The two singles and album were followed by two more singles, "Just the Way You Are" in April 1975 and "Last Night" in May 1976, but he had no further top 50 successes.

== Criminal conviction and spell in Chelmsford ==
In 1975 John Cave was convicted of statutory rape of a 15-year-old girl from his Melbourne fan club, and he received two years probation. He left Albert Productions in 1977 and had no further recordings — his pop music career was over due to his criminal conviction and changes in music styles.

In 1978 Shakespeare, who had an alcohol addiction and clinical depression, was treated with Deep Sleep Therapy (in combination with electroconvulsive therapy and other therapies) by Dr Harry Bailey at the Chelmsford Private Hospital for three weeks. From 1979 until the mid 1990s, Shakespeare sometimes performed as Billy Shake in Sydney clubs as a 1970s revival act.

A temporary revival of his singing career occurred in 1990 when listeners of Triple M Melbourne voted "My Little Angel" as the daggiest song of their generation and a cover version was provided by the Melody Lords. For his day job, Shakespeare was a car detailer at a Holden dealership in Arncliffe, New South Wales for most of his working life. In late 1992 he appeared as a guest on the "Countdown" segment in series 1 episode 12 of the ABC comedy show The Late Show and performed "My Little Angel" live.

== Decline and death ==
Mental illness and alcoholism took its toll on his personal life and by 2001, Shakespeare was homeless and lived in a ticket booth at an oval next to St George's Leagues Club in Kogarah, where he was found and assisted by Lindy Morrison (ex-The Go-Betweens drummer) of Support Act Limited, a company concerned with assisting artists in hard times.

In 2009, Shakespeare was living in government housing in the southern Sydney suburb of Riverwood. William Shakespeare (John Cave) died suddenly in Sydney on 5 October 2010. Tributes to his life and music appeared in the Australian media.

== Discography ==
=== Studio albums ===
List of albums, with Australian chart positions
Title	Album details	Peak chart positions
Title	Album details	AUS
Can't Stop Myself from Loving You	Released: 25 November 1974; Format: LP; Label: Albert Productions	27

=== Singles ===
Year	Single	Chart Positions	Album
Year	Single	AUS	Album
1974	"Can't Stop Myself from Loving You"	2	Can't Stop Myself From Loving You
1974	"My Little Angel"	1	Can't Stop Myself From Loving You
1975	"Just The Way You Are"	57	Can't Stop Myself From Loving You
1976	"Last Night"	97	Non-Album Single

== See also ==
- 1974 in music
- List of artists who reached number one on the Australian singles chart
