= Don't Go Now =

1992 single by Ratcat

Single by Ratcat

from the album Blind Love
- Released: April 1991
- Length: 3:12
- Label: rooArt
- Songwriters: Simon Day, Robyn St Clare
- Producer: Nick Mainsbridge

Ratcat singles chronology
"Saying Goodbye" (1989)	"Don't Go Now" (1991)	"Baby Baby" (1991)

"Don't Go Now" is a single by Australian indie pop band Ratcat, released in April 1991. It went peaked at No. 1 in Australia, becoming their second number-one single after the Tingles extended play (EP). Nick Mainsbridge was nominated for Engineer of the Year at the ARIA Music Awards of 1992 for "Don't Go Now".

== Track listing ==
- CD single (rooArt 878 861-2)
1. "Don't Go Now" – 3:13
2. "The Lie" – 2:53
3. "Midnight" – 1:42

== Reception ==
Double J named it in the top fifty Australian songs of the 1990s, saying, "Charming as its melody and sentiment were, the thought of something as punkish and vital as ‘Don't Go Now' sitting in the number one spot on the charts is beyond belief. It's got the basics of a perfect pop tune; Only difference is, this one has a bitchin' fuzz solo in the middle of it."

== Charts ==
On Australia's ARIA Singles Chart, "Don't Go Now" debuted at No. 8 and peaked at No. 1 six weeks later, spending 13 weeks in the top 50.

=== Weekly charts ===
Chart (1991)	Peak position
Australia (ARIA)	1

=== Year-end charts ===
Chart (1991)	Position
Australia (ARIA)	32

== Certifications ==
Region	Certification	Certified units/sales
Australia (ARIA)	Gold	35,000^{^}
^{^} Shipments figures based on certification alone.

== Release history ==
Region	Date	Format(s)	Label	Ref.
Australia	April 1991	7-inch vinyl; CD; cassette	rooArt	

== See also ==
- List of number-one singles in Australia during the 1990s
