= Total Euphoria =

Studio album by Euphoria
- Released: 19 October 1992
- Studio: Melbourne, Australia
- Genre: Electronic, house, techno, dance-pop
- Length: 54:00
- Label: EMI Australia
- Producer: Andrew Klippel, Ian Sugarman

Singles from Total Euphoria
- 1. "Love You Right" Released: October 1991; 2. "One in a Million" Released: April 1992; 3. "Do For You" Released: August 1992; 4. "I Will Never Leave You" Released: November 1992

Total Euphoria is the first and only studio album by the Australian dance trio Euphoria. The album was released in October 1992 by EMI Australia and peaked at number 14 on the Australian Albums Chart. The album featured four singles, two of which reached number one on the Australian Singles Chart: "Love You Right" in February 1992 and "One in a Million" in June 1992. The album was co-produced and co-written by Andrew Klippel and Ean Sugarman.

== Track listing ==
Total Euphoria track listing
No.	Title	Length
1.	"The Power (Intro)"	0:23
2.	"Love You Right"	3:36
3.	"One in a Million"	3:56
4.	"Do for You"	4:24
5.	"The Power"	4:28
6.	"Move Me"	5:31
7.	"I Will Never Leave You"	3:54
8.	"Wheels in Motion"	4:19
9.	"Because of You"	6:05
10.	"Keep It Coming"	4:13
11.	"Show Me the Way"	4:19
12.	"Save Your Loving"	3:36
13.	"Baby I Want It" (featuring Young MC)	5:33
Total length:		54:00

== Charts ==
Chart (1992)	Peak position
Australia (ARIA)	14
