= List of top 25 albums for 1990 in Australia =

Top 25 albums of 1990 < 1989 1991 >

Other Australian top charts for 1990
- top 25 singles
- Triple J Hottest 100

Australian number-one charts of 1990
- albums
- singles

These are the top 50 albums of 1990 in Australia from the Australian Recording Industry Association (ARIA) End of Year Albums Chart.

#	Title	Artist	Highest pos. reached	Weeks at No. 1
1.	Chain Reaction	John Farnham	1	5
2.	In Concert	The Three Tenors	1	2
3.	Blue Sky Mining	Midnight Oil	1	2
4.	Two Fires	Jimmy Barnes	1	5
5.	The Immaculate Collection	Madonna	1	5 (Note: The Immaculate Collection peaked at #1 in December 1990 on the ARIA chart for three weeks, it returned to #1 for two weeks in mid-January 1991 and was still in the Top 50 until November. It returned the Top 50 late in 1992 and again in 1993, 1994 and 1995.)
6.	Pretty Woman	Soundtrack	1	4
7.	All or Nothing	Milli Vanilli	1	5
8.	Sleeping with the Past	Elton John	2	
9.	Alannah Myles	Alannah Myles	2	
10.	Soul Provider	Michael Bolton	1	3
11.	Cuts Both Ways	Gloria Estefan	1	2
12.	21st Anniversary: The Ultimate Collection	Creedence Clearwater Revival	3	
13.	Safety in Numbers	Margaret Urlich	5	
14.	...But Seriously	Phil Collins	1	3 (Note: ...But Seriously peaked at #1 in December on the ARIA chart for three weeks and was still in the Top 50 for 40 weeks in 1990, it returned to the Top 50 for one week in 1993.)
15.	The Very Best of Elton John	Elton John	1	1 (Note: The Very Best of Elton John first entered the ARIA charts in November 1990 and peaked at #1 in January 1991 for one week. It was continuously in the Top 50 until May 1991, it returned later in 1991 and again in 1992, 1993, 1997, 1998 and 2002. Its total time in the Top 50 was 51 weeks.)
16.	Can't Fight Fate	Taylor Dayne	7	
17.	The Razors Edge	AC/DC	3	
18.	Come In Spinner	TV Soundtrack Grace Knight & Vince Jones	4	
19.	Pump	Aerosmith	1	3
20.	Forever Your Girl	Paula Abdul	1	1
21.	Harry's Cafe de Wheels	Peter Blakeley	3	
22.	The Best of Van Morrison	Van Morrison	1	3
23.	Beyond Salvation	The Angels	1	2
24.	Runaway Horses	Belinda Carlisle	6	
25.	Cosmic Thing	The B-52's	1	3
26.	I'm Breathless	Madonna	1	3
27.	The Latest and Greatest	Skyhooks	4	
28.	The 12th Man Again	The Twelfth Man	1	1
29.	X	INXS	1	2
30.	I Do Not Want What I Haven't Got	Sinéad O'Connor	1	1
31.	The Very Best of Cat Stevens	Cat Stevens	6	
32.	Still Got the Blues	Gary Moore	5	
33.	Changesbowie	David Bowie	6	
34.	Blaze of Glory	Jon Bon Jovi	2	
35.	Their Greatest Hits	The Carpenters	9	
36.	The Rhythm of the Saints	Paul Simon	3	
37.	The Real Thing	Faith No More	2	
38.	Reason to Believe	Rita MacNeil	17	
39.	The Best of Rod Stewart	Rod Stewart	7	
40.	Heart of Stone	Cher	1	1
41.	I'm Your Baby Tonight	Whitney Houston	10	
42.	JW's Family Album	John Williamson	21	
43.	Greatest Hits	The Bangles	6	
44.	Waking Hours	Del Amitri	8	
45.	Flesh & Blood	Poison	2	
46.	Missing...Presumed Having a Good Time	The Notting Hillbillies	6	
47.	Collected Works	Hunters & Collectors	6	
48.	Code Blue	Icehouse	7	
49.	Please Hammer, Don't Hurt 'Em	MC Hammer	5	
50.	The Other Side	1927	3	

Peak chart positions from 1990 are from the ARIA Charts, overall position on the End of Year Chart is calculated by ARIA based on the number of weeks and position that the records reach within the Top 50 albums for each week during 1990.
