= Baby Baby (Ratcat song) =

Single by Ratcat

from the album Blind Love
- Released: 7 July 1991
- Genre: Indie pop; Indie rock
- Length: 3:41
- Label: rooArt
- Songwriter: Simon Day
- Producer: Nick Mainsbridge

Ratcat singles chronology
"Don't Go Now" (1991)	"Baby Baby" (1991)	"Candyman" (1992)

"Baby Baby" is a single by Australian indie pop band Ratcat, released in July 1991 as the second single from the band's second studio album, Blind Love.

== Track listing ==
- CD-Single (rooArt 868-145-2)
1. "Baby Baby" - 3:41
2. "Cuts & Scratches" - 2:26

== Charts ==
"Baby Baby" debuted at No.23 and peaked at No.21 where it remained for three weeks.

Chart (1991)	Peak position
Australia (ARIA)	21

== Release history ==
Region	Date	Format(s)	Label
Australia	July 1991	CD single	rooArt
