= Ratcat (EP) =

EP by Ratcat
- Released: July 1987
- Recorded: July–August 1987
- Studio: Blue Harbour Studios
- Genre: Alternative rock; indie rock
- Label: Waterfront Records
- Producer: Mark Roxburgh; Phil Kerney; Ratcat

Ratcat chronology
Ratcat (1987)	This Nightmare (1989)

Ratcat is the debut extended play (EP) by Australian indie pop band Ratcat, released in July 1987, shortly after they signed to Waterfront Records. The EP was placed on high rotation on Triple J.

== Track listing ==
Side A
No.	Title	Writer(s)	Length
1.	"Time Bomb (Of Hate)"	Ratcat	3:07
2.	"Daughter Darling"	Ratcat	2:54
3.	"Car Crash"	Ratcat	3:15

Side B
No.	Title	Writer(s)	Length
1.	"I Think We're Alone Now"	Ritchie Cordell	2:54
2.	"She's Gone"	Ratcat	5:31
3.	"Radio One"	Ratcat	0:49

== Release history ==
Region	Date	Format(s)	Label	Catalogue
Australia	July 1987	12" EP	Waterfront Records	DAMP 66
