= Candyman (Ratcat song) =

Single by Ratcat

from the album Insideout
- Released: May 1992
- Recorded: March–May 1992
- Studio: Rhinoceros Recordings, Sydney
- Genre: Indie rock
- Length: 2:50
- Label: rooArt
- Songwriters: Simon Day, Mark Stewart, Andrew Polin
- Producer: Nick Mainsbridge

Ratcat singles chronology
"Baby Baby" (1991)	"Candyman" (1992)	"Holiday" (1992)

"Candyman" is a single by Australian indie pop band Ratcat, released in May 1992 as the lead single from the band's third studio album, Insideout.

== Track listing ==
- CD-single (rooArt 4509904362)
1. "Candyman" – 2:50
2. "Another Planet" – 3:51
3. "Kitten" – 3:38
4. "Puppet" – 3:16

== Charts ==
"Candyman" debuted at No. 44 and peaked at No. 38 three weeks later.

=== Weekly charts ===
Chart (1992)	Peak position
Australia (ARIA)	38

== Release history ==
Region	Date	Format(s)	Label
Australia	May 1992	CD single	rooArt
