= List of top 25 albums for 1992 in Australia =

Top 25 albums of 1992 < 1991 1993 >

Other Australian top charts for 1992
- top 25 singles

Australian number-one charts of 1992
- albums
- singles

These are the top 50 albums of 1992 in Australia from the Australian Recording Industry Association (ARIA) End of Year Albums Chart.

#	Title	Artist	Highest pos. reached	Weeks at No. 1
1.	Jesus Christ Superstar (92 Australian Cast)	Musical	1	10 (Note: Jesus Christ Superstar was first performed as a musical in Australia from May 1972 to February 1974, and provided Jesus Christ Superstar (Original Australian Cast Recording) in 1972. The musical returned to the Australian stage in 1992, and provided Jesus Christ Superstar (92 Australian Cast), which peaked at #1 on debut in August 1992 on the ARIA chart for ten weeks and was still in the Top 50 until February 1993.)
2.	Baby Animals	Baby Animals	1	6
3.	Soul Deep	Jimmy Barnes	1	5 (Note: Soul Deep debuted at #1 in November 1991 for two weeks. It returned to #1 in January 1992, and was still in the Top 50 until August.)
4.	Hepfidelity	Diesel	1	4
5.	Blood Sugar Sex Magik	Red Hot Chili Peppers	1	2
6.	Back to Front	Lionel Richie	1	6
7.	Greatest Hits: 1966–1992	Neil Diamond	1	3 (Note: Greatest Hits: 1966–1992 peaked at #1 in May 1992 for two weeks. It left the Top 50 album chart in September 1992, returned in April 1996 and spent a total of 33 weeks in the Top 50.)
8.	Performs Andrew Lloyd Webber	Michael Crawford	1	1
9.	Some Gave All	Billy Ray Cyrus	3	
10.	The Commitments	Soundtrack	2	
11.	Greatest Hits II	Queen	4	
12.	ABBA Gold: Greatest Hits	ABBA	1	2 (Note: ABBA Gold: Greatest Hits peaked at #1 in December 1992 for two weeks. It left the Top 50 album chart in April 1993. It returned to the Top 50 in October 1994 peaking at #3 in December. Returned in May 1999 and peaked at #2 in June. Returned in July 2008 and peaked at #4. As of February 2009, it was still in the Top 50 and has spent a total of 109 weeks there.)
13.	Greatest Hits	ZZ Top	2	
14.	Diamonds and Pearls	Prince & the N.P.G.	1	1
15.	Tribal Voice	Yothu Yindi	4	
16.	Greatest Hits	Queen	2	(Note: Greatest Hits by Queen peaked at #2 in 1981 on the Kent Music Report. It entered the ARIA albums Top 50 in December 1991 peaking at #8 in April 1992.)
17.	Nevermind	Nirvana	2	
18.	Use Your Illusion II	Guns N' Roses	1	3 (Note: Use Your Illusion II debuted on the ARIA charts at #1 in September 1991 and remained at the top spot for three weeks. It left the Top 50 in May 1992, but returned in September and remained until May 1993. Its total time in the Top 50 was 62 weeks.)
19.	Dangerous	Michael Jackson	1	4 (Note: Dangerous peaked on the ARIA charts at #1 in December 1991 for four weeks to January 1992. It left the Top 50 in October 1992, but returned in 1993 and 1994, its total time in the Top 50 was 50 weeks.)
20.	Stars	Simply Red	6	
21.	Form 1 Planet	Rockmelons	3	
22.	Shepherd Moons	Enya	9	
23.	The Greatest Hits	Salt-N-Pepa	2	
24.	Adrenalize	Def Leppard	1	2
25.	Unplugged	Mariah Carey	7	
26.	We Can't Dance	Genesis	8	
27.	The One	Elton John	2	
28.	This Road	James Blundell	4	
29.	Summer Dreams	The Beach Boys	11	
30.	Erotica	Madonna	1	2
31.	Dr. Hook's Greatest Hits	Dr. Hook	2	
32.	Glittering Prize 81/92	Simple Minds	1	1
33.	Lily	Wendy Matthews	2	
34.	The Greatest Hits	Noiseworks	4	
35.	The Essential Joe Cocker	Joe Cocker	4	
36.	Friends for Life	José Carreras	2	
37.	My Girl	Soundtrack	4	
38.	AC/DC Live	AC/DC	1	2
39.	The Immaculate Collection	Madonna	1	5
40.	Tourism	Roxette	3	
41.	Waking Up the Neighbours	Bryan Adams	1	4
42.	Scream in Blue	Midnight Oil	3	
43.	Make It Come True	Girlfriend	6	
44.	Watermark	Enya	8	
45.	Unplugged	Eric Clapton	1	8
46.	What Hits!?	Red Hot Chili Peppers	9	
47.	Keep the Faith	Bon Jovi	1	1
48.	It Had to Be You	Harry Connick Jr.	4	
49.	Metallica	Metallica	1	1
50.	Strictly Ballroom	Soundtrack	6	

Peak chart positions from 1992 are from the ARIA Charts, overall position on the End of Year Chart is calculated by ARIA based on the number of weeks and position that the records reach within the Top 50 albums for each week during 1992.
