= Blind Love (album) =

Studio album by Ratcat
- Released: 20 May 1991
- Genre: Indie pop; indie rock; noise pop; pop punk
- Length: 40:19
- Label: rooArt
- Producer: Nick Mainsbridge

Ratcat chronology
Tingles (EP) (1990)	Blind Love (1991)	Alive (1991)

Blind Love is the second studio album by Australian indie pop band Ratcat. It was released on 20 May 1991. It was their most successful album and went to peak at No.1 in Australia.

It was nominated for Breakthrough Artist - Album at the ARIA Music Awards of 1992.

== Reception ==
Blind Love was given 3 out of 5 in a review by AllMusic.

In The Sell-In, Craig Mathieson said the album, "lived up to Simon Day's belief in the disposability ethic. It spat out one buzzsaw, troublegum tune after another, delivered with punkish verve and given the sheen rooArt hoped for by producer Nick Mainsbridge. It sounded impossibly simple, but that's what distinguished it from the pack."

== Track listing ==
rooArt 848523-2
No.	Title	Writer(s)	Length
1.	"Yes I Wanna Go"	Simon Day	2:40
2.	"Run & Hide"	Day	3:04
3.	"Baby Baby"	Day	3:43
4.	"Hopeless Mind"	Day	4:17
5.	"Pieces"	Day, Amr Zaid	3:18
6.	"Racing"	Day, Zaid	3:32
7.	"That Ain't Bad"	Day	4:05
8.	"The Wonder of You"	Day	3:04
9.	"Don't Go Now"	Robyn St.Clare	3:11
10.	"Strange"	Day	4:07
11.	"The End"	Day	5:13

- Note: On the LP/Cassette version, tracks 1–6 are "side A" and tracks 7–11 are "side B"

== Credits ==
- Illustrations by Simon Day
- Photography – Linda Marlin
- Produced and ecorded by Nick Mainsbridge
- Engineers – Robbie Rowlands, Scott Christie
- Backing vocals – Margaret Urlich, Robyn St. Clare

== Charts ==
=== Weekly charts ===
Chart (1991)	Peak position
Australian Albums (ARIA)	1

=== Year-end charts ===
Chart (1991)	Position
Australia (ARIA)	35

== Certifications ==
Region	Certification	Certified units/sales
Australia (ARIA)	Platinum	70,000^{^}
^{^} Shipments figures based on certification alone.

== Release history ==
Region	Date	Format	Label	Catalogue	Ref.
Australia	June 1991	CD; LP; Cassette	rooArt	848523-2	

== See also ==
- List of number-one albums in Australia during the 1990s
