= Check Out the Chicken =

Single by Grandmaster Chicken & D.J. Duck

from the album Animal Party With Grandmaster Chicken & D.J. Duck
- Released: 1989
- Length: 4:18
- Label: Mercury
- Songwriter(s): Terry Rendall, Werner Thomas Hall, Gary Shelter

Grandmaster Chicken & D.J. Duck singles chronology
"Check Out the Chicken" (1989)	"Like a Yo-Yo" (1991)

"Check Out the Chicken" is a song and debut single by Dutch production duo, Grandmaster Chicken & D.J. Duck. The song was released in 1989 peaked at number 20 in The Netherlands and Australia.

== Track listing ==
1. "Check Out the Chicken" - 4:18
2. "Eggs" - 3:57

== Charts ==
=== Weekly charts ===
Chart (1989/1990)	Peak position
Australia (ARIA)	16
Belgium (Ultratop 50 Flanders)	25
New Zealand (Recorded Music NZ)	32
Netherlands (Dutch Top 40)	13

=== Year-end charts ===
Chart (1990)	Rank
Australia (ARIA Charts)	92
