= Do for You =

1992 single by Euphoria

Single by Euphoria

from the album Total Euphoria
- Released: 10 August 1992
- Length: 4:31
- Label: ESP; EMI
- Songwriters: Andrew Klippel; Ean Sugarman
- Producers: Andrew Klippel; Ean Sugarman

Euphoria singles chronology
"One in a Million" (1991)	"Do for You" (1992)	"I Will Never Leave You" (1992)

"Do for You" is a 1992 song recorded by Australian dance-pop trio Euphoria. The track was released in August 1992 as the third single from their debut studio album, Total Euphoria. The track peaked at number seven on the Australian ARIA Singles Chart, becoming their third and final top-10 single.

== Track listing ==
Australian maxi-CD

1. "Do for You" – 4:33
2. "Baby, I Want It" (featuring Young MC) – 5:33
3. "Love You Right" (Wilde De Coster Remix) – 5:58
4. "I Want It" – 5:35

== Charts ==
=== Weekly charts ===
Chart (1992)	Peak position
Australia (ARIA)	7

=== Year-end charts ===
Chart (1992)	Position
Australia (ARIA)	73
