= Rococo (duo) =

Italian duo

- Origin: Italy
- Years active: 1989–1991
- Labels: Hot; Virgin

Rococo were an Italian dance duo, best known for their 1989 single "Italo House Mix" which featured interpretations of Italo house songs at the time.

== Discography ==
=== Albums ===
List of albums, with selected details
Title	Details
Are You Ready	Released: 1990; Format: LP, CD, cassette; Label: Hot, Virgin

=== Singles ===
List of singles, with selected chart positions
Title	Year	Chart positions		Album	Certification
Title	Year	AUS	UK	Album	Certification
"Italo House Mix"	1989	13	54	ARIA: Gold	Are You Ready
"Inside Out"	1990	64	—		Are You Ready
"Do it"	1990	—	—		Are You Ready
"Dance Invasion"	1991	—	—		non album single
