= One in a Million (Euphoria song) =

1992 single by Euphoria

Single by Euphoria

from the album Total Euphoria
- Released: 19 April 1992
- Length: 3:53
- Label: EMI
- Songwriter(s): Andrew Klippel; Ean Sugarman
- Producer(s): Andrew Klippel; Ean Sugarman

Euphoria singles chronology
"Love You Right" (1991)	"One in a Million" (1992)	"Do for You" (1992)

"One in a Million" is a song by Australian dance-pop act Euphoria. The track was released on 19 April 1992 and later appeared on their debut album, Total Euphoria. The song became the group's second single to reach number one on the Australian ARIA Singles Chart.

== Track listing ==
Australian CD single

1. "One in a Million" (7-inch radio edit) (3:53)
2. "One in a Million" (12-inch mix) (5:53)
3. "One in a Million" (dub mix) (3:54)

== Charts ==
=== Weekly charts ===
Chart (1992)	Peak position
Australia (ARIA)	1

=== Year-end charts ===
Chart (1992)	Position
Australia (ARIA)	51

== Certification ==
Region	Certification	Certified units/sales
Australia (ARIA)	Gold	35,000^{^}
^{^} Shipments figures based on certification alone.
