= Radio Freedom (band) =

Australian musical group

- Origin: Sydney, New South Wales, Australia
- Genres: Dance
- Years active: 1991–1994
- Labels: Westside/Phonogram
- Past members: Paul "Pehl" Snashall; Brett "True" O'Hara; Ralph Alvaro

Radio Freedom were an Australian dance band, who were active in the early 1990s. They had a top ten hit with their single "I Can Feel It" (1992). Band members were Paul "Pehl" Snashall, Brett "True" O'Hara and Ralph Alvaro The group supported a tour by Elton John in 1993 and issued an album, Beyond the Peach Tree, before disbanding in 1994.

== History ==
In November 1991 Radio Freedom were formed in Sydney as a duo by Brett "True" O'Hara on turntables and Paul "Pehl" Snashall on lead vocals, guitar and keyboards. O'Hara was a local DJ while Snashall had completed an audio engineering degree before becoming a bass guitarist in a grunge band. Snashall then played lead guitar in a pop group and keyboards in covers band. Their debut single, "I Can Feel It", was released on 18 May 1992 and peaked at No. 7 on the ARIA Singles Chart. It was co-written by O'Hara and Snashall with Miguel Montoya. The Canberra Times' Charles Miranda described its sonation, "'90s funk, Latin American Salsa with a little calypso island feel thrown in for good measure."

"I Can Feel It" had been played on TV series, E Street, which was organised by their label, Westside Records through their same parent company, Westside Television Productions. Their second single, "Proove", was released in August and reached No. 30, which was written by O'Hara and Snashall. Their third single released in February 1993, was a cover version of Bob Marley's "Is This Love". Early in 1993 the group supported an Australian tour by Elton John. John informed Snashall that Westside had blocked plans for Radio Freedom to continue John's tour beyond Australia and that their label was insolvent.

Following several delays, Radio Freedom's debut album, Beyond the Peach Tree, was released in November 1993. By that time they were a three-piece with Ralpha Alvaro joining on lead guitar. Nicole Leedham of The Canberra Times felt it was "not too bad. Admittedly, [the band] is never going to win a prize for profundity but this debut album is, at least, pretty groovy." The group disbanded in 1994.

In June 2022 Snashall revealed the band's problems with Westside in a podcast, A Journey Through Aussie Pop, "Episode 9: Radio Freedom with Paul Snashall."

== Members ==
Credits:

- Brett "True" O'Hara – turntables, scratches, loops
- Paul "Pehl" Snashall – lead vocals, guitar, keyboards
- Ralph Alvaro – lead guitar

== Discography ==
=== Albums ===
List of albums, with selected details
| Title | Details |
|---|---|
| Beyond the Peach Tree | Released: November 1993; Format: CD, cassette; Label: Westside/Phonogram (514 244-2) |

=== Singles ===
List of singles, with selected chart positions and certifications
| Title | Year | Peak chart positions | Certifications | Album |
| Title | Year | AUS | Certifications | Album |
|---|---|---|---|---|
| "I Can Feel It" | 1992 | 7 | ARIA: Gold | Beyond the Peach Tree |
| "Proove" | 1992 | 30 | | Beyond the Peach Tree |
| "Is This Love" | 1993 | 51 | | Beyond the Peach Tree |
| "Edge of the World (Love Storm)" | 1993 | — | | Beyond the Peach Tree |
