= Tingles =

EP by Ratcat
- Released: 1 October 1990
- Length: 23:18
- Label: rooArt
- Producer: Nick Mainsbridge

Ratcat chronology
This Nightmare (1989)	Tingles (1990)	Blind Love (1991)

Tingles is an extended play (EP) by Australian indie pop band Ratcat, released on 1 October 1990. It went on to peak at No.1 in Australia and finished 1991 as the second best-selling single of the year, behind "(Everything I Do) I Do It for You" by Bryan Adams. It was also the highest-selling single in Australia by an Australian artist in 1991. The EP was promoted by the song "That Ain't Bad", which charted on the US Billboard Modern Rock Tracks chart, peaking at number 27 in November 1991.

== Reception ==
Tingles was given 4.5 out of 5 in a review by All Music.

Steve Gardner from NKVD Records said "I'm really surprised they could chart with a guitar sound this gnarly; the songs are obvious radio pop stuff, but songs made for radio don't have guitars mixed as loud as the vocals and they certainly don't have the distortion set to 10." adding "All of the first side is excellent, and "Skin" from the second side is equally good. "Away from This World" sounds cool on first listen as the music is married with the soundtrack from the Challenger space shuttle explosion, but it doesn't hold up to repeated play and "My Bloody Valentine" is a throwaway experiment that fizzled out. Still, a pleasant surprise and show of potential for good things still to come."

In The Sell-In, Craig Mathieson said, "Day had written "That Aint Bad" in a simple attempt to mix noisy guitars and the words 'I love you' together in a song. He thought it was funny, coming from the thrash-punk scene. The result was undeniably catchy." Junkee described "That Aint Bad" as, "buzzy and ever-so-slightly painful: It’s an ode buried amongst an entire broken speaker’s worth of feedback that eventually descends into a series of scream-sung promises. Blast it outside the house of your beloved through a cassette player held aloft over your head."

== Track listing ==
No.	Title	Writer(s)	Length
1.	"That Ain't Bad"	Simon Day	4:04
2.	"Tingles"	Day	3:26
3.	"Don't Go in the Water"	Day, Amr Zaid, Andrew Polin	3:47
4.	"Getting Away (From This World)"	Day	5:19
5.	"Skin"	Day	3:20
6.	"My Bloody Valentine"	Day	3:22

== Charts ==
=== Weekly charts ===
Chart (1991)	Peak position
Australia (ARIA)	1
US Modern Rock Tracks (Billboard) "That Ain't Bad"	27

=== Year-end charts ===
Chart (1991)	Position
Australia (ARIA)	2

== Certifications ==
Region	Certification	Certified units/sales
Australia (ARIA)	Platinum	70,000^{^}
^{^} Shipments figures based on certification alone.

== Release history ==
Region	Date	Format	Label	Ref.
Australia	1 October 1990	CD	rooArt	
United Kingdom	15 July 1991	Mini-album	rooArt	

== See also ==
List of number-one singles in Australia during the 1990s
