= Euphoria (Australian band) =

Australian band

- Origin: Sydney, New South Wales, Australia
- Genres: Dance-pop; dance; house; Eurodance
- Years active: 1991–1993
- Labels: ESP/EMI
- Past members: Holly Garnett; Andrew Klippel; Keren Minshull; Jodhi Meares

Euphoria were an Australian dance-pop trio formed in 1991. They were founded by producer and songwriter Andrew Klippel on keyboards and backing vocals with lead vocals and dancing by Holly Garnett and Keren Minshull. Euphoria had two number-one hits on the ARIA Singles Chart, "Love You Right" (November 1991) and "One in a Million" (April 1992). Their third single, "Do for You" (August 1992), peaked at No. 7. Their sole album, Total Euphoria (October 1992), reached No. 14 on the related ARIA Albums Chart. Model Jodhi Meares replaced Garnett after she left in 1992. The group disbanded in mid-1993. Holly Garnett died by suicide in October 1998, aged 29.

== History ==
=== 1991–1993 ===
Euphoria were founded in Sydney in 1991 by producer Andrew Klippel (son of sculptor, Robert Klippel) on keyboards and backing vocals with lead vocals and dancing by both Holly Garnett and Keren Minshull. Klippel and Minshull were bandmates from Electric Soul. Klippel had been in a number of local bands and formed a song writing and production duo, ESP, with Melbourne-based DJ, Ean Sugarman, in the early 1990s. Minshull had previously worked as a session vocalist for Swanee, Noni Hazlehurst, and Jade Hurley. Minshull provided co-lead vocals with Rick Price on "Celebration of a Nation" (1988).

One of the tracks co-written by Klippel and Sugarman, "Love You Right", was recorded as a demo. Sugarman provided the band's name after riding with a trucker and playing him the demo, who described it as "Euphoria". "Love You Right" was issued as a single in October 1991, via ESP/EMI Music Australia. The song and music video were featured on an Australian TV soap opera, E Street. Widespread radio airplay followed, and it reached No. 1 on the ARIA Singles Chart in February 1992, becoming the 24th highest selling single of that year.

The music video includes two E Street cast members, Kelley Abbey (who played JoJo Adams) and Simon Baker (Sam Farrell), as backup dancers. At the ARIA Music Awards of 1992 "Love You Right" had the group nominated for Best New Talent. It peaked at No. 19 on the Recorded Music NZ Singles Chart in March 1992 and the top 80 in the UK Singles Chart in September.

The group's second single, "One in a Million", was issued in April 1992 and also reached No. 1. On the end of the year singles chart it appeared at No. 51. A third single followed, "Do for You" (August), which peaked at No. 7, and the less-successful fourth single, "I Will Never Leave You" (November), at No. 41. All four singles appear on their only album, "Total Euphoria" (October 1992), which reached No. 14 on the related ARIA Albums Chart. It was co-produced, and all tracks were co-written, by Klippel and Sugarman.

Klippel later admitted that he had formed the group after "Love You Right" had achieved success. The song had been written and recorded with little expectation of success, and when it became a hit he assembled a group to promote it. Their success was tarnished when it was revealed that Garnett lip-synced to Minshull's vocals in the music video – although Minshull does appear briefly (the reason was that Minshull was 42 at the time, and Garnett was dating Klippel, as well as promotional reasons from the record label who felt Garnett would be the face of the group). A second video for "Love You Right" was filmed, with Minshull in a more-prominent role, to promote the single's release in Europe (Minshull later said in an interview on Seven Network's Morning Show in 2018 that this was the first time she had seen the video). For "One in a Million" both Garnett and Minshull shared vocals and screen-time in the video.

According to Australian musicologist, Ian McFarlane, by that time, "all was not harmonious within the group... It had been decided that the blonde Garnett was a more appropriate face with which to launch and market Euphoria than the dark-haired Minshull. The whole thing backfired, various tensions and bitterness arose within the group." Garnett departed in mid-1992, after recording the album, and was replaced by Jodhi Meares on co-lead vocals. Meares appears in the music video for "I Will Never Leave You", although she had not recorded the track.

A further single, "Elated", was released in July 1993 (No. 66) but the group disbanded soon after. "Love You Right" was remixed in 1997, it included a remix by 2 Unlimited. However, the 1997 remix did not chart. McFarlane described the group as, "one of the first local outfits of the 1990s to embrace a lightweight, techno dance-pop ethic as espoused in the USA by the likes of C + C Music Factory, Black Box and 2 Unlimited."

== After Euphoria ==
=== 1994–present ===
Klippel worked as a songwriter or producer for Human Nature, Marta Sánchez, Katie Noonan, and Jocelyn Brown. He formed the dance bands Elastic and A.K. Soul, the latter released singles "Free" and "Show You Love", featuring Brown, in 1997.

Minshull and Garnett undertook session vocals work and solo projects. Sugarman relocated to the United States and worked as a DJ, remixer and producer. Minshull continued as a Sydney-based singer-songwriter, releasing an album You're Driving in 2011 and launching her label, Keren Minshull Music, in 2012. In 2011 she commented that despite their success, she feels that Euphoria is dated and does not reflect the mainstream music of today. However, in a 2018 interview, she acknowledged that Euphoria's success helped usher Australia's music industry into the dance genre after years of resistance. Meares returned to modelling and later launched a fashion clothing line.

Holly Garnett died by suicide on Tuesday, 13 October 1998 at the age of 29. She was buried on Thursday, 22 October 1998 at Castle-Brook Memorial Gardens. She died partly due to the plight of her older brother, Martin Garnett (born 1966), who is a convicted drug trafficker and was arrested in Thailand in September 1993. Martin was in various Thai prisons and was placed on death row; when he completed his commuted sentence there in 2011, he was transferred to an Indiana prison due to smuggling drugs into that US state (while in a Thai prison). He served the final part of his sentence in Sydney before being freed in 2015.

== Discography ==
=== Albums ===
| Title | Details | Peak positions |
| Title | Details | AUS |
|---|---|---|
| Total Euphoria | Released: 19 October 1992; Label: EMI (#780 6142); Format: CD, cassette | 14 |

=== Singles ===
| Year | Single | Peak positions | | | Certifications (thresholds) | Album |
| Year | Single | AUS | NZ | UK | Certifications (thresholds) | Album |
|---|---|---|---|---|---|---|
| 1991 | "Love You Right" | 1 | 19 | 76 | ARIA: Platinum | Total Euphoria |
| 1992 | "One in a Million" | 1 | — | — | ARIA: Gold | Total Euphoria |
| 1992 | "Do for You" | 7 | — | — | | Total Euphoria |
| 1992 | "I Will Never Leave You" | 41 | — | — | | Total Euphoria |
| 1993 | "Elated" | 66 | — | — | | Non-album singles |
| 1997 | "Love You Right ('97 Mixes)" | — | — | — | | Non-album singles |
"—" denotes releases that did not chart.

== Awards and nominations ==
=== ARIA Music Awards ===
The ARIA Music Awards is an annual awards ceremony that recognises excellence, innovation, and achievement across all genres of Australian music. They commenced in 1987.

| Year | Nominee / work | Award | Result | Ref. |
| 1992 | "Love You Right" | Best New Talent | Nominated | |
| 1993 | "One in a Million" | Highest Selling Single | Nominated | |

== See also ==
- List of artists who reached number one on the Australian singles chart
