= Ratcat =

Australian indie rock band

- Ratcat in 1991

Background information
- Origin: Sydney, New South Wales, Australia
- Genre: Indie rock
- Years active: 1985–1998, 2006–present
- Labels: Waterfront; rooArt/PolyGram; Mercury
- Members: Simon Day; Nic Dalton; Reuben Alexander
- Past members: Victor Levi; Trevor Wintle; Andrew Polin; John McAteer; Cathy Webb; Amr Zaid; Marc Scully

Ratcat are an Australian indie rock band from Sydney who formed in 1985. The band is fronted by mainstay vocalist and guitarist, Simon Day. Their combination of indie pop song writing and energetic punk-style guitar rock won them fans from both the indie and skate-punk communities. They found mainstream success with their extended play, Tingles (October 1990), album Blind Love (June 1991) and the single, "Don't Go Now" (April), which all reached No. 1 on the ARIA Charts during 1991. The band released two subsequent albums that did not match their earlier chart success. Ratcat ceased performing live regularly in the late 1990s; however, they continue to perform sporadically. During their career, much of Ratcat's albums and singles artwork was created by Simon Day.

== Career ==
=== 1985–1990: Career beginnings and Waterfront Records ===
Ratcat were formed in 1985 in Sydney by Simon Day on lead guitar and lead vocals, Victor Levi on bass guitar and Andrew Polin on drums. Both Day and Levi had been members of garage band, Danger Mouse. Ratcat "built-up a strong live following by playing the local haunts of the Sydney skate-punk scene alongside the likes of Massappeal, The Hellmenn, The Hard-ons and Happy Hate Me Nots."

The group signed to Waterfront Records, and released a self-titled extended play in December 1987, which "contained four of the band's self-penned stage favourites plus a cover of "I Think We're Alone Now"." It was followed by two singles, "I Think I Love You" (August 1988) and "Baby's Got a Gun" (December).

In July 1989, the band released its debut album, This Nightmare. By that time the line-up was Day, John McAteer on bass guitar and Andrew Polin on drums. According to Australian musicologist Ian McFarlane, the album "contained a treasure-trove of witty, effervescent Day-penned tracks like "Go Go", "True Lust", "Baby's Got a Gun" and "The Killing Joke", plus a cover of UK band The Darling Buds' "If I Said"." Another single, "Saying Goodbye" was released late in 1989 which was their final release on Waterfront. Amr Zaid replaced McAteer on bass guitar and backing vocals. Alister of Tharunka felt "Saying Goodbye" was "quite refreshing, both in the areas of its mixing and melody, despite decidedly average vocals."

=== 1990–1998: Blind Love and rooArt records ===
In February 1990, Ratcat supported English group Buzzcocks and fellow Australian band Falling Joys, before signing with the rooArt label, distributed by PolyGram.

On 14 October 1990, the group released a six-track EP entitled, Tingles, which was produced by Nick Mainsbridge (Tall Tales and True, Martha's Vineyard). McFarlane noticed that "almost immediately the frisky "That Ain't Bad" scored mainstream radio support." That track, combined with their cartoon, tattoo-ish artwork (which featured heavily on their releases and in their videos), saw Tingles reach No. 1 on ARIA Alternative Singles Chart and, in May 1991, the EP was a number-one hit on the ARIA Singles Chart for two weeks. "That Ain't Bad", the lead track, was Day's "simple attempt to mix noisy guitars and the words 'I love you' together in a song without one contradicting the other." The Canberra Times reviewer opined that it "has had the airplay, but it is not the best track. "Don't Go in the Water", a dire little track, and "Getting Away (From This World)", with its hackneyed but fairly successful insertion of sound from the Challenger shuttle disaster, are both excellent tracks."

According to an Australian Musician Magazine staff writer, Ratcat were the first alternative band to go mainstream – they provided one of the Top 50 Most Significant Moments in Australian Pop/Rock History. The band's second album, Blind Love was released in May 1991, and its lead single "Don't Go Now" (April) both reached No. 1 on their respective ARIA charts. The song was co-written by Day and Robyn St. Clare (of the Hummingbirds). For recording, at Paradise Studios, Day, Polin and Zaid were joined by St. Clare and Margaret Urlich on backing vocals; they were produced by Mainsbridge, again. Zaid told Charles Miranda of The Canberra Times that their chart success was "really weird it happened so quickly it's sort of difficult for us to understand what has happened. And it does put pressure on us to come up with the goods. We have to look at what we've done [... but not] perform to any sort of dictated standard by what we've achieved."

The group supported fellow Australian group, INXS, on the latter's Australian tour in April and May 1991 and followed by headlining their own Invasion of the Dinosaur Killers Tour in June. Their next single, "Baby Baby", was released in July and reached No. 21. In September they started a four-month tour across the United Kingdom, continental Europe and the United States. Polin described how "We were playing to full houses a lot of the way around... Admittedly, in London about a third of the audiences were Australians but we had sold about 17,000 copies of our album over there."

Upon their return to Australia in December, they released an eight-track live album, Alive. Marc Scully replaced Zaid on bass guitar in mid-1992. Their third studio album, Insideout (November 1992) also produced by Mainsbridge, spawned three singles, "Candyman" (May 1992), "Holiday" (October 1992) and "The World (in a Wrapper)" (May 1993). It was recorded between March and May 1992 at Rhinoceros Studios, with Day providing vocals, guitar and bass guitar; and Polin on vocals, drums and percussion. McFarlane opined that these releases "were unable to repeat the spectacular success of their predecessors but kept Ratcat in the public eye."

In January 1995, the band released "Rain", which was produced by Tony Cohen, and EP The Smiler in August 1995, and started work on a new album, Easy Rider. The band sporadically played live shows over the next few years and Easy Rider was eventually released in July 1997.

Ratcat re-emerged in 1998 to play at the Homebake Festival with a new bass guitarist, Nic Dalton (ex-The Plunderers, Sneeze, The Lemonheads, among others). They also collaborated with John Paul Young – who supplied backing vocals – on a cover version of his earlier single, "I Hate the Music" (September 1998). It was included on the soundtrack for the feature film, Occasional Coarse Language (November 1998). The band officially disbanded in 1998.

=== 2002–present: periodic performances ===
The group played a few shows in 2002, including a spot at the Big Day Out, and, in 2006, were a support act on the Psychedelic Furs Australian tour. They did a further gig at The Jack Daniel's music awards and played, in early June 2006, at the Come Together festival at Luna Park. In 2011, they played a show at The Factory in Marrickville, to mark the 20th anniversary of Blind Love.

A 2010 TV ad for Bonds' brassieres featured a group of women dressed in the branded underwear performing a cover version of Ratcat's "That Ain't Bad" on a street float. An apparently shocked Day made a brief appearance as a passer-by, wearing his once signature black and white striped T-shirt and black jeans, reminiscent of the look he sported in early Ratcat videos. He has also appeared with Sydney bands including the Art, and the Glimmer (formerly the Mansons). In 2011 Ratcat were confirmed for Sydney's Homebake festival, subtitled "The Classic Edition".

The band played as part of the A Day on the Green concert series in March 2016, with Hoodoo Gurus, Sunnyboys, Violent Femmes and Died Pretty.

In October 2023, Ratcat will release All Stripped Back, a re-recording of their greatest hits.

== Members ==
- Simon Day – vocals, guitar, bass guitar, main songwriter (1985–present)
- Trevor Wintle – drums (1986–1987)
- Andrew Polin – drums (1985–1986, 1987–2011)
- Victor Levi – bass guitar (1985–1988)
- Cathy Webb – bass guitar (1988)
- John McAteer – bass guitar (1988–1989)
- Amr Zaid – bass guitar, backing vocals (1989–1992)
- Marc Scully – bass guitar (1992–1996)
- Nic Dalton – bass guitar (1998–present)
- Reuben Alexander - drums (2011-present)

== Discography ==
=== Studio albums ===
List of studio albums, with selected chart positions and certifications
Title	Album details	Peak chart positions	Certifications
Title	Album details	AUS	Certifications
This Nightmare	Released: July 1989; Label: Waterfront (DAMP 103); Formats: LP, CD	81	
Blind Love	Released: May 1991; Label: rooArt (848523); Formats: LP, CD	1	ARIA: Platinum
Insideout	Released: November 1992; Label: rooArt (4509905532); Formats: CD, cassette	59	
Easy Rider	Released: July 1997; Label: rooArt (74321492912); Formats: CD	—	
All Stripped Back	Released: 13 October 2023; Label: Ratcat; Formats: CD, digital	—	

=== Live albums ===
List of live albums
Title	Album details	Peak chart positions
Title	Album details	AUS
Alive	Released: December 1991; Label: rooArt (510686); Formats: CD, cassette	62

=== Compilation albums ===
List of compilation albums
Title	Album details
Informer 80:629	Released: December 1993; Label: Shock (RAISON006); Formats: CD
Twisted Tails - A Ratcat Best of...	Released: September 2001; Label: Sony BMG (74321867012); Formats: CD
Rarities	Released: 18 February 2011; Label: Ratcat; Formats: Digital download, streaming

=== Extended plays ===
List of extended plays, with selected chart positions and certifications
Title	EP details	Peak chart positions	Certifications
Title	EP details	AUS	Certifications
Ratcat	Released: July 1987; Label: Waterfront (DAMP 66); Formats: LP, CD	—	
Tingles	Released: October 1990; Label: rooArt (878 165); Formats: LP, CD, cassette	1	ARIA: Platinum
The Smiler	Released: July 1995; Label: rooArt (0630113442); Formats: CD	135	
Laughing Bag and Other Funny Stories	Released: July 1997; Label: rooArt (74321492932); Formats: CD	—	

=== Singles ===
List of singles, with selected chart positions and certifications
Title	Year	Peak chart positions	Certifications	Album
Title	Year	AUS	Certifications	Album
"I Think I Love You"/”Depression”	1988	—		non-album single
"Go Go"	1988	—		This Nightmare
"Baby's Got a Gun"/”Purple Room”	1988	—		This Nightmare
"Saying Goodbye"	1989	—		non-album single
"Don't Go Now"	1991	1	ARIA: Gold	Blind Love
"Baby Baby"	1991	21		Blind Love
"Candyman"	1992	38		Inside out
"Holiday"	1992	41		Inside out
"The World (In a Wrapper)"	1993	115		Inside out
"Rain"	1995	138		non-album single
"I Hate the Music" (Ratcat and John Paul Young)	1998	186		Occasional Course Language (soundtrack)

== Other appearances ==
List of other non-single song appearances
Title	Year	Album
"Razor Blades"	1986	On the Waterfront, vol 3 (DAMP 43)
"The Purple Room"	1987	Fuck or Fuck Off (DAMP 67)
"Everything You Said"	1988	Hummingbirds/ Ratcat
"Dead Dog Standing"	1989	I Could'a Been a Contender (DAMP 121)
"A Christmas Lullaby"	1989	Rockin' Bethlehem (SAW025)
"You Get Me By"	1990	Youngblood 2
"Skin"	1991	Triple J Live At The Wireless
"Tripping on a Blind Date"	1998	Homebake Vol 2
"That Ain't Bad"/"Don't Go Now"/"You Get Me By"	2001	Rockart - The History Of RooArt Records
"Electric Lash"	2002	Electric Lash (songs of The Church and Steve Kilby)
"Hell on Hot Bread"	2015	Manilow Tribute!

== Awards and nominations ==
=== ARIA Music Awards ===
The ARIA Music Awards is an annual awards ceremony that recognises excellence, innovation, and achievement across all genres of Australian music. They commenced in 1987.

Year	Nominee / work	Award	Result	Ref.
1992	Blind Love	Breakthrough Artist - Album	Nominated	
1992	Blind Love	Highest Selling Album	Nominated	
1992	Nick Mainsbridge for Blind Love and "Don't Go Now"	Producer of the Year	Nominated	
1992	Nick Mainsbridge for Blind Love and "Don't Go Now"	Engineer of the Year	Nominated	
