= Love You Right =

1991 single by Euphoria

Single by Euphoria

from the album Total Euphoria
- Released: 28 October 1991
- Length: 3:31
- Label: ESP, EMI
- Songwriters: Andrew Klippel, Ean Sugarman
- Producers: Andrew Klippel, Ean Sugarman

Euphoria singles chronology
"Love You Right" (1991)	"One in a Million" (1992)

"Love You Right" is a song by Australian electronic music group Euphoria. Released as their debut single on 28 October 1991, the track reached number one on the Australian ARIA Singles Chart and would be the first of two number-one singles in Australia for the trio. The track was remixed by 2 Unlimited when it was released in the United Kingdom. At the ARIA Music Awards of 1992, the song earned Euphoria a nomination for Best New Talent, losing to Underground Lovers by Underground Lovers.

== Music video ==
The song's video was launched by being shown at the start of episode 260 of soap opera E Street when character Wheels watches TV and is surprised to see his housemate Jo jo (Kelley Abbey) in the video. (Along with current cast member Abbey, the video also features future E Street cast member and future Mentalist Simon Baker Denny.)

When the video for the track was first released, many assumed that member Holly Garnett was the lead singer of the song. Another member, Keren Minshull, actually did the vocals (she appears in the video but in few scenes), which resulted the group being accused of lip synching which would tarnish the group's image later on in their short career. Minshull noted at the time that they did the video the label wasn't sure they wanted an older woman (and a brunette) to be featured, as Minshull was 42 when the single was released, opting to go with the younger and blonde Garnett (who was also dating Klippel at the time) instead as the face of the group.

A second video for "Love You Right" was filmed, with Minshull in a more-prominent role, to promote the single's release in Europe. Minshull mentioned in a 2018 interview that she never saw the second version until the presenters doing the interview showed her the clip.

== Track listings ==
Australian CD, 12-inch, and cassette single

1. "Love You Right" (radio edit) – 3:43
2. "Love You Right" (live club mix) – 6:46
3. "Love You Right" (a cappella) – 2:06
4. "Love You Right" (club mix) – 6:48
5. "Love You Right" (orchestral mix) – 3:35

Australian 7-inch single

A. "Love You Right" (radio edit) – 3:43
B. "Love You Right" (acapella) – 2:06

European maxi-CD single

1. "Love You Right" (extended) – 5:56
2. "Love You Right" (7-inch mix) – 3:44
3. "Love You Right" (7-inch instrumental) – 3:44
4. "Love You Right" (instrumental) – 5:57

UK 7-inch single

A. "Love You Right" (radio edit) – 3:43
B. "Love You Right" (orchestral mix) – 3:35

UK 12-inch single

A1. "Love You Right" (Delta Sigma mix)
A2. "Love You Right" (Delta Sigma instrumental mix)
B1. "Love You Right" (club mix)
B2. "Love You Right" (2 Unlimited mix)

UK CD single

1. "Love You Right" (radio edit)
2. "Love You Right" (Delta Sigma mix)
3. "Love You Right" (a cappella)
4. "Love You Right" (club mix)
5. "Love You Right" (orchestral mix)

Japanese mini-CD single

1. "Love You Right" (7-inch radio edit)
2. "Love You Right" (live club mix)

== Charts ==
=== Weekly charts ===
Chart (1992)	Peak position
Australia (ARIA)	1
New Zealand (Recorded Music NZ)	19

=== Year-end charts ===
Chart (1992)	Position
Australia (ARIA)	24

== Certification ==
Region	Certification	Certified units/sales
Australia (ARIA)	Platinum	70,000^{^}
^{^} Shipments figures based on certification alone.

== Release history ==
Region	Date	Format(s)	Label(s)	Ref.
Australia	28 October 1991	Cassette	ESP; EMI	
United Kingdom	31 August 1992	7-inch vinyl; 12-inch vinyl; CD; cassette	EMI	
Japan	3 February 1993	Mini-CD	EMI	
