= Free discography =

Cataloging of published recordings by Free

- Studio albums: 6
- Extended plays: 1
- Live albums: 2
- Compilation albums: 18
- Singles: 16
- Video albums: 2

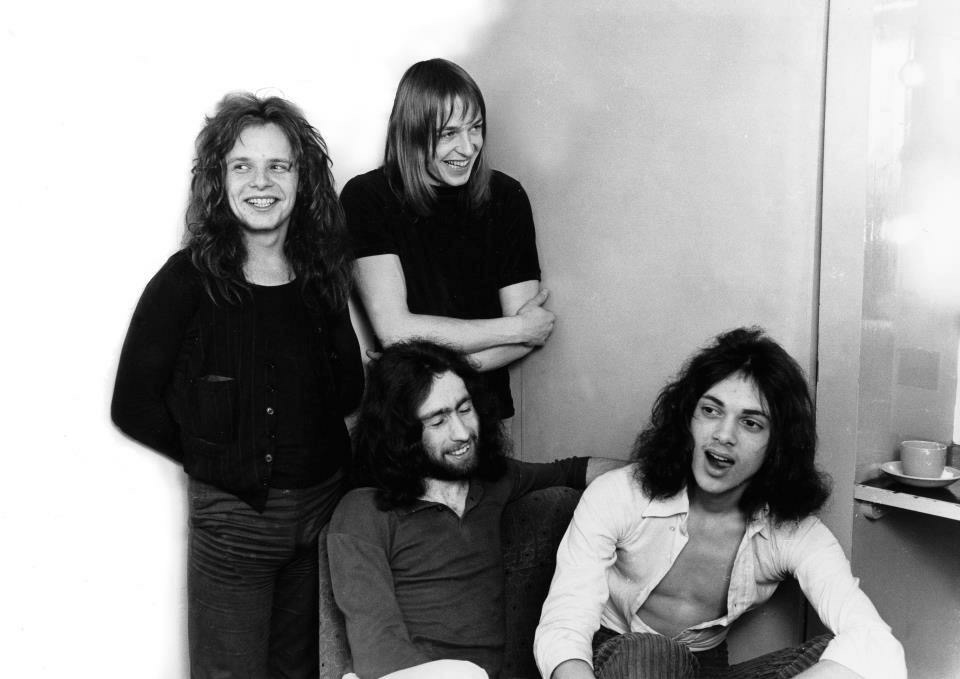
Left to right standing: Paul Kossof and Simon Kirke. Sitting: Paul Rodgers and Andy Fraser

Free was an English rock band formed in London in 1968 by singer Paul Rodgers, guitarist Paul Kossoff, bassist Andy Fraser and drummer Simon Kirke. Signed with Island Records, the group are known for their hit songs "All Right Now” and "Wishing Well". Free's discography consists of six studio albums, two live albums, 18 compilation albums, one EP, 16 singles and two video albums. The band released their debut album Tons of Sobs in 1969. The album entered the US Billboard 200 chart at number 197. Free's self-titled second album failed in sales and charts, before the 1970 follow-up Fire and Water peaked at number 2 on the UK Albums Chart, supported by the popular single "All Right Now" which reached the same position on the UK Singles Chart. The single also reached the top ten in a number of other regions, including the United States where it peaked at number 4 on the Billboard Hot 100.

Free's fourth album Highway reached number 41 on the UK Albums Chart, while its lead single "Stealer" charted at number 49 on the Billboard Hot 100. Free broke up in 1971 due to tensions between members of the band. In September, the group's first live album Free Live! was released, reaching number 4 on the UK Albums Chart and number 89 on the Billboard 200. The non-album single "My Brother Jake", released the same year, peaked at number 4 in the UK. Free reunited the following year, releasing Free at Last in June 1972 which reached the top ten of the UK Albums Chart. In early 1973 the band released Heartbreaker, which was recorded primarily by Rodgers and Kirke due to Fraser's departure and Kossoff's drug problems.

The band broke up permanently later in 1973, with Rodgers and Kirke going on to form Bad Company later that year. Island issued the first Free compilation at the end of the year, The Free Story, which reached number 2 on the UK Albums Chart and was certified silver by the British Phonographic Industry (BPI). Many more compilations followed in the subsequent years, including The Best of Free: All Right Now in 1991, which reached the top ten in the UK, and Chronicles in 2005, which reached number 42 on the chart. The Very Best of Free & Bad Company Featuring Paul Rodgers, released in 2010, which also features tracks by Bad Company, peaked at number 10 on the UK Albums Chart and was certified silver by the BPI. The band reached the top ten on the UK Singles Chart again in 1991, with a remixed version of "All Right Now" which peaked at number 8.

== Albums ==
=== Studio albums ===
List of studio albums, with selected chart positions
Title	Album details	Peak chart positions							Certifications
Title	Album details	UK	AUS	CAN	FIN	GER	NOR	US	Certifications
Tons of Sobs	Released: 14 March 1969; Label: Island; Format: LP	—	—	—	—	—	—	197	
Free	Released: October 1969; Label: Island; Format: LP	—	28	—	—	86	32	177	
Fire and Water	Released: 26 June 1970; Label: Island; Formats: LP, 8-track	2	25	34	17	30	19	17	BPI: Silver
Highway	Released: December 1970; Label: Island; Formats: LP, 8-track	41	11	—	—	43	—	190	
Free at Last	Released: June 1972; Label: Island; Format: LP, 8-track	9	32	—	—	—	—	—	
Heartbreaker	Released: 19 January 1973; Label: Island; Format: LP	7	29	26	—	9	—	47	
"—" denotes a release that did not chart or was not issued in that region.									

=== Live albums ===
List of live albums, with selected chart positions
Title	Album details	Peak chart positions				
Title	Album details	UK	UK Rock	AUS	GER	US
Free Live!	Released: 4 June 1971; Label: Island; Format: LP	4	—	18	45	89
Free – Live at the BBC	Released: 1 April 2006; Label: Island; Formats: 2CD, DL	127	15	—	——	—
"—" denotes a release that did not chart or was not issued in that region.

=== Compilations ===
List of compilation albums, with selected chart positions and certifications
Title	Album details	Peak chart positions						Certifications
Title	Album details	UK	UK Bud.	UK Rock	UK Vinyl	US	AUS	Certifications
Best of Free	Released: 1972; Label: A&M; Formats: LP, 8-track	—	—	—	—	120	—	
The Free Story	Released: 31 December 1973; Label: Island; Format: 2LP	2	—	—	—	—	34	BPI: Silver
Free & Easy, Rough & Ready	Released: November 1976; Label: Island; Format: LP	—	—	—	—	—	—	
Completely Free	Released: 1982; Label: Island; Formats: LP, CS	—	—	—	—	—	55	
The Best of Free: All Right Now	Released: 1 February 1991; Label: Island; Formats: CD, LP, CS	9	29	—	—	—	—	BPI: Silver
Molten Gold: The Anthology	Released: 5 October 1993; Labels: A&M, Island, Chronicles; Format: 2CD	—	—	—	—	—	—	
Walk in My Shadow: An Introduction to Free	Released: 3 November 1998; Label: Island Masters; Format: CD	—	—	—	—	—	—	
All Right Now	Released: 1999; Label: Spectrum; Format: CD	—	13	—	—	—	—	
Songs of Yesterday	Released: 10 October 2000; Label: Island; Formats: 5CD, DL	150	—	11	—	—	—	
Classic Free	Released: 2001; Labels: Island, Universal; Format: CD	—	8	—	—	—	—	
20th Century Masters – The Millennium Collection: The Best of Free	Released: 6 August 2002; Label: A&M, Universal, Chronicles; Format: CD	—	—	—	—	—	—	
Chronicles	Released: 5 April 2005; Labels: Universal, Chronicles; Format: 2CD	42	—	10	—	—	—	
Walking in My Shadow: The Free Collection	Released: 7 May 2007; Label: Universal; Format: 2CD	—	—	—	—	—	—	
Rock Legends	Released: 28 January 2008; Labels: Island, Universal; Format: CD	—	—	—	—	—	—	
The Very Best of Free & Bad Company Featuring Paul Rodgers (with Bad Company)	Released: 6 April 2010; Labels: Rhino, UMTV; Format: CD	10	—	—	—	—	—	BPI: Silver
Wishing Well: The Collection	Released: 2010; Label: Spectrum; Formats: 2CD, DL	—	—	—	—	—	—	
All Right Now: The Collection	Released: 29 October 2012; Label: Spectrum; Formats: CD, DL	—	—	—	—	—	—	BPI: Silver
The Vinyl Collection	Released: 16 September 2016; Label: Island; Format: 7LP	—	—	26	19	—	—	
All Right Now: The Essential Free	Released: 2018; Label: Island; Format: 3CD	—	—	—	—	—	—	
"—" denotes a release that did not chart or was not issued in that region.

=== Video albums ===
List of video albums, with selected chart positions and certifications
Title	Album details	Peak	Certifications
Title	Album details	UK	Certifications
Free	Released: 1989; Label: Island; Format: VHS	—	
Forever	Released: 2006; Label: Island; Format: 2DVD	1	BPI: Gold
"—" denotes a release that did not chart or was not issued in that region.

== Extended plays ==
List of extended plays, with selected chart positions
Title	Album details	Peak
Title	Album details	UK
The Free EP: All Right Now (Long Version)/Wishing Well/My Brother Jake	Released: 1978; Label: Island (IEP 6); Format: 7" vinyl (45rpm)	11

== Singles ==
List of singles, with selected chart positions and certifications, showing year released and album name
Title	Year	Peak chart positions										Certifications	Album
Title	Year	UK	AUT	BEL (FL)	CAN	FIN	GER	NED	NOR	SWI	US	Certifications	Album
"I'm A Mover"	1969	—	—	—	—	—	—	—	—	—	—		Tons of Sobs
"Walk in My Shadow"	1969	—	—	—	—	—	—	—	—	—	—		Tons of Sobs
"Broad Daylight"	1969	—	—	—	—	—	—	—	—	—	—		Free
"I'll Be Creeping"	1969	—	—	—	—	—	—	—	—	—	—		Free
"Fire and Water"	1970	—	—	—	—	—	—	—	—	—	—		Fire and Water
"All Right Now"	1970	2	6	10	4	26	5	8	9	4	4	BPI: Platinum	Fire and Water
"The Stealer"	1970	51 (Note: Chart position is from the official UK "Breakers List".)	16	—	40	—	37	—	—	—	49		Highway
"Ride on a Pony"	1970	—	—	—	—	—	—	—	—	—	—		Highway
"The Highway Song"	1971	—	—	—	—	—	—	—	—	—	—		Highway
"My Brother Jake"	1971	4	—	—	—	—	—	—	—	—	—		Non-album single
"Little Bit of Love"	1972	13	—	—	—	—	—	—	—	—	119		Free at Last
"Wishing Well"	1972	7	—	—	—	—	47	—	—	—	112		Heartbreaker
"Travellin' in Style"	1973	51	—	—	—	—	—	—	—	—	—		Heartbreaker
"The Hunter"	1976	58	—	—	—	—	—	—	—	—	—		Tons of Sobs
"Wishing Well" (remix)	1985	96	—	—	—	—	—	—	—	—	—		Non-album single
"All Right Now" (remix)	1991	8	—	—	—	—	—	—	—	—	—		The Best of Free: All Right Now
"My Brother Jake" (remix)	1991	—	—	—	—	—	—	—	—	—	—		The Best of Free: All Right Now
"—" denotes a release that did not chart or was not issued in that region.

== See also ==
- List of songs recorded by Free
