= List of songs recorded by Free =

This is a list of all songs performed by the English rock band Free.

== Songs recorded by Free ==
Title	Year	Release	Songwriter(s)	Notes
"All Right Now"	1970	Fire and Water	Rodgers/Fraser	
"Be My Friend"	1970	Highway	Rodgers/Fraser	
"Bodie"	1970	Highway	Rodgers/Fraser	
"Broad Daylight"	1969	Free	Rodgers/Fraser	
"Burnin' (Molten Gold)"	1972	Bonus track	Kossoff	Free at Last sessions
"Catch a Train"	1972	Free at Last	Rodgers/Fraser/Kossoff/Kirke	
"Child"	1972	Free at Last	Rodgers/Fraser/Kossoff/Kirke	
"Come Together in the Morning"	1973	Heartbreaker	Rodgers	
"Common Mortal Man"	1973	Heartbreaker	Bundrick	
"Don't Say You Love Me"	1970	Fire and Water	Rodgers/Fraser	
"Easy on My Soul"	1973	Heartbreaker	Rodgers	
"Fire and Water"	1970	Fire and Water	Rodgers/Fraser	
"Free Me"	1969	Free	Rodgers/Fraser	
"Get Where I Belong"	1971	Free Live!	Rodgers/Fraser	
"Goin' Down Slow"	1968	Tons of Sobs	Oden	
"Goodbye"	1972	Free at Last	Rodgers/Fraser/Kossoff/Kirke	
"Guardian of the Universe"	1972	Free at Last	Rodgers/Fraser/Kossoff/Kirke	
"Guy Stevens Blues"	1968	Bonus track	Rodgers/Fraser/Kossoff/Kirke	Tons of Sobs sessions
Hand Me Down/Turn Me Round	1973	Bonus track	Bundrick	Heartbreaker sessions
"Heartbreaker"	1973	Heartbreaker	Rodgers	
"Heavy Load"	1970	Fire and Water	Rodgers/Fraser	
"Honky Tonk Women"	1972	Bonus track	Jagger/Richards	Free at Last sessions
"I'll Be Creepin'"	1969	Free	Rodgers/Fraser	
"I'm a Mover"	1968	Tons of Sobs	Rodgers/Fraser	
"Just for the Box"	1971	The Free Story	Kossoff	Performed by Kossoff Kirke Tetsu Rabbit
"Lady"	1971	The Free Story	Rodgers	Performed by Peace
"Let Me Show You"	1973	Bonus track	Rodgers/Kossoff/Kirke/Yamauchi/Bundrick	Heartbreaker sessions
"Little Bit of Love"	1972	Free at Last	Rodgers/Fraser/Kossoff/Kirke	
"Love You So"	1970	Highway	Rodgers/Kirke	
"Lying in the Sunshine"	1969	Free	Rodgers/Fraser	
"Magic Ship"	1972	Free at Last	Rodgers/Fraser/Kossoff/Kirke	
"Moonshine"	1968	Tons of Sobs	Rodgers/Kossoff	
"Mourning Sad Morning"	1969	Free	Rodgers/Fraser	
"Mouthful of Grass"	1969	Free	Rodgers/Fraser	
"Mr. Big"	1970	Fire and Water	Rodgers/Fraser/Kossoff/Kirke	
"My Brother Jake"	1971	Released as a single	Rodgers/Fraser	Highway sessions and on The Free Story compilation
"Muddy Water"	1973	Heartbreaker	Bundrick	
"Oh I Wept"	1970	Fire and Water	Rodgers/Kossoff	
"On My Way"	1970	Highway	Rodgers/Fraser	
"Only My Soul"	1971	Bonus track	Rodgers/Fraser	Highway sessions
"Over the Green Hills Pts. 1 & 2"	1968	Tons of Sobs	Rodgers	
"Rain"	1970	Bonus track	Rodgers/Fraser	Highway sessions
"Remember"	1970	Fire and Water	Rodgers/Fraser	
"Ride on a Pony"	1970	Highway	Rodgers/Fraser	
"Sail On"	1972	Free at Last	Rodgers/Fraser/Kossoff/Kirke	
"Seven Angels"	1973	Heartbreaker	Rodgers	
"Soldier Boy"	1972	Free at Last	Rodgers/Fraser/Kossoff/Kirke	
"Songs of Yesterday"	1969	Free	Rodgers/Fraser	
"Soon I Will Be Gone"	1970	Highway	Rodgers/Fraser	
"Sugar for Mr. Morrison"	1969	Bonus track	Rodgers/Fraser	Free sessions
"Sunny Day"	1970	Highway	Rodgers/Fraser	
"Sweet Tooth"	1968	Tons of Sobs	Rodgers	
"The Highway Song"	1970	Highway	Rodgers/Fraser	
"The Hunter"	1968	Tons of Sobs	Jones/Wells/Dunn/Jackson/Cropper	
"The Stealer"	1970	Highway	Rodgers/Fraser/Kossoff	
"The Worm"	1969	Bonus track	Rodgers/Fraser	Free sessions
"Travellin' in Style"	1973	Heartbreaker	Rodgers/Kossoff/Kirke/Yamauchi/Bundrick	
"Travellin' Man"	1972	Free at Last	Rodgers/Fraser/Kossoff/Kirke	
"Trouble on Double Time"	1969	Free	Rodgers/Fraser/Kossoff/Kirke	
"Visions of Hell"	1968	Bonus track	Rodgers/Fraser	Tons of Sobs sessions
"Waitin' on You"	1968	Live at the BBC	King/Washington	
"Walk in My Shadow"	1968	Tons of Sobs	Rodgers	
"Wild Indian Woman"	1968	Tons of Sobs	Rodgers/Fraser	
"Wishing Well"	1973	Heartbreaker	Rodgers/Kossoff/Kirke/Yamauchi/Bundrick	
"Woman"	1969	Free	Rodgers/Fraser	
"Woman by the Sea"	1968	Bonus track	Rodgers/Fraser	Tons of Sobs sessions
"Worry"	1968	Tons of Sobs	Rodgers	
