= The Free Story =

Greatest hits album by Free
- Released: 31 December 1973
- Recorded: 1968–1972
- Genres: Blues rock, hard rock
- Length: 1:16:24
- Label: Island

Free chronology
Heartbreaker (1973)	The Free Story (1973)	Completely Free (1982)

Professional ratings
Review scores
Source	Rating
Allmusic	link

The Free Story is the second greatest hits album by Free, and the first which was released outside of the US. It was released on 31 December 1973 by Island Records. The album reached number 2 in the UK Albums Chart and stayed in the charts for 6 weeks. On 22 July 2013, the album was awarded a silver certification by the BPI, for UK album sales of over 60,000 units.

The album covers the entire studio album collection of Free from their debut album Tons of Sobs through to their final studio album Heartbreaker and includes their biggest hit single "All Right Now". It also has two non-Free tracks: "Just for the Box", from the album Kossoff Kirke Tetsu Rabbit, and "Lady", from Rodgers' post-Free group Peace, which included bassist Stewart McDonald and drummer Mick Underwood. The original intention was to include the version of Travelling Man by Andy Fraser's 1971 group Toby, but (probably at the insistence of Fraser) this track was removed and replaced by Free's version. Some German copies of the album have the Toby version.

Initial copies of the album in the UK had an individual serial number on the front in the manner of The Beatles' The Beatles ("The White Album").

== Track listing ==
Side one
No.	Title	Writer(s)	Album	Length
1.	"I'm a Mover"	Andy Fraser, Paul Rodgers	from Tons of Sobs	2:49
2.	"I'll Be Creepin'"	Fraser, Rodgers	from Free	3:27
3.	"Mourning Sad Morning"	Fraser, Rodgers	from Free	5:05
4.	"All Right Now"	Fraser, Rodgers	single version	4:14
5.	"Heavy Load"	Fraser, Rodgers	from Fire and Water	5:05

Side two
No.	Title	Writer(s)	Album	Length
1.	"Fire and Water"	Fraser, Rodgers	from Fire and Water	3:40
2.	"Be My Friend"	Fraser, Rodgers	from Highway	5:44
3.	"The Stealer"	Fraser, Rodgers, Paul Kossoff	from Highway	3:00
4.	"Soon I Will Be Gone"	Fraser, Rodgers	from Highway	2:45
5.	"Mr Big"	Fraser, Rodgers, Kossoff, Simon Kirke	from Free Live!	6:00

Side three
No.	Title	Writer(s)	Album	Length
1.	"The Hunter"	Booker T. Jones, Carl Wells, Donald Dunn, Al Jackson, Jr., Steve Cropper	from Free Live!	5:00
2.	"Get Where I Belong"	Fraser, Rodgers	from Free Live!	4:08
3.	"Travelling Man"	Fraser, Rodgers, Kossoff, Kirke	from Free at Last; originally recorded as a demo by Fraser's group 'Toby'	3:25
4.	"Just for the Box"	Kossoff	from Kossoff, Kirke, Tetsu and Rabbit	3:20
5.	"Lady"	Rodgers	previously unreleased; by Rodgers' group 'Peace'	4:25

Side four
No.	Title	Writer(s)	Album	Length
1.	"My Brother Jake"	Fraser, Rodgers	single release only	2:55
2.	"Little Bit of Love"	Fraser, Rodgers, Kossoff, Kirke	from Free at Last	2:32
3.	"Sail On"	Fraser, Rodgers, Kossoff, Kirke	from Free at Last	3:00
4.	"Heartbreaker"	Rodgers	previously unreleased 'live' soundboard recording, omitted from CD versions.	5:00
5.	"Come Together in the Morning"	Rodgers	from Heartbreaker	4:20

== Charts ==
Chart (1974)	Peak position
Australian Albums (Kent Music Report)	34
UK Albums (Official Charts)	2

Chart (1997–1999)	Peak position
UK Rock & Metal Albums (Official Charts)	25

== Certifications ==
Region	Certification	Certified units/sales
United Kingdom (BPI) 1993 release	Silver	60,000^{^}
^{^} Shipments figures based on certification alone.
