= Island Masters =

Mid-Price album series released by Island Records

Island Masters is a midprice CD series that includes re-releases of records from the 1970s and 1980s by PolyGram. In 1989 Island Records was sold to PolyGram. The series was released in the UK and Europe.

In the UK, the discs were released with the prefix IMCD and catalogue numbers starting with 1. In some European countries, the catalogue numbers were the same, and in some they were not. This series was not released in the US. In Canada, some releases were made available as imports through PolyGram Canada. It was Island's first major attempt to make available its huge back catalogue on CD. The first year of the sublabel has seen more than 80 releases. New releases appeared for some years. In 2000, the label was re-modeled and renamed to Island Remasters. While the packaging of the Island Masters of the 1980s and 1990s was simple the newer Island Remaster followed a trend to a better packaging with higher print quality of the cover, additional slip cases, booklets, addition tracks and label prints using the label of the original LP releases.

== Island Masters, 1989 ==
- IMCD 1 – The B-52's: The B-52's, original release; 1979
- IMCD 2 – Bourgeois Tagg: Yoyo, original release: 1987
- IMCD 3 – Black Uhuru: Reggae Greats, original release: 1985 on Island Reggae Greats
- IMCD 4 – Buckwheat Zydeco: On A Night Like This, original release: 1987
- IMCD 5 – Burning Spear: Reggae Greats, original release: 1985 on Island Reggae Greats
- IMCD 6 – Kid Creole & The Coconuts: Tropical Gangsters, original release: 1982 on ZE/Island ILPS 7016
- IMCD 7 – Peter Cook & Dudley Moore Present... Derek and Clive (Live), original release: 1976
- IMCD 8 – Nick Drake: Five Leaves Left, 5/1989, original release: 1969
- IMCD 9 – Eric B. & Rakim: Paid in Full, original release: 1987
- IMCD 10 – Fairport Convention: In Real Time (Live '87), 6/1990, original release: 12/1987
- IMCD 11 – Marianne Faithfull: Broken English, original release: 1979
- IMCD 12 – Marianne Faithfull: Strange Weather, original release: 1987
- IMCD 13 – Frankie Goes To Hollywood: Liverpool, original release: 1986
- IMCD 14 – Linton Kwesi Johnson: Reggae Greats, original release: 1985 on Island Reggae Greats
- IMCD 15 – Grace Jones: Warm Leatherette, original release: 1980
- IMCD 16 – Grace Jones: Island Life, compilation; original release: 1985
- IMCD 17 – Grace Jones: Nightclubbing, original release: 1981
- IMCD 18 – Grace Jones: Living My Life, original release: 1982
- IMCD 19 – Grace Jones: Portfolio, original release: 1977
- IMCD 20 – Robert Palmer: Sneakin' Sally Through the Alley, original release: 1974
- IMCD 21 – Robert Palmer: Clues, original release: 1980
- IMCD 22 – Robert Palmer: Pride, original release: 1983
- IMCD 23 – Robert Palmer: Double Fun, original release: 1978
- IMCD 24 – Robert Palmer: Pressure Drop, original release: 1975
- IMCD 25 – Robert Palmer: Riptide, original release: 1985
- IMCD 26 – Robert Palmer: Secrets, original release: 1979
- IMCD 27 – Shriekback: Go Bang!, original release: 1988
- IMCD 28 – Shriekback: Big Night Music, original release: 1986
- IMCD 29 – Sly & Robbie: Rhythm Killers, original release: 1987
- IMCD 30 – Ultravox: Three on One, original release: 1978
- IMCD 31 – The Big Easy (original motion picture soundtrack), 1987
- IMCD 32 – Sweet Lies (original motion picture soundtrack), 1988
- IMCD 33 – Steel Pulse: Reggae Greats, original release: 1985 on Island Reggae Greats
- IMCD 34 – Cat Stevens: Catch Bull at Four, original release: 1972
- IMCD 35 – Cat Stevens: Mona Bone Jakon, original release: 1970
- IMCD 36 – Cat Stevens: Tea for the Tillerman, original release: 1970
- IMCD 37 – Third World: Reggae Greats, original release: 1985 on Island Reggae Greats
- IMCD 38 – Toots & The Maytals: Reggae Greats, original release: 1985 on Island Reggae Greats
- IMCD 39 – Steve Winwood, Jim Capaldi, Dave Mason, Chris Wood, Rick Grech, Reebop Kwaku Baah, Jim Gordon: Welcome To The Canteen, 1971
- IMCD 40 – Traffic: John Barleycorne Must Die, original release: 1970
- IMCD 41 – Traffic: Last Exit, original release: 1969
- IMCD 42 – Traffic: The Low Spark of High Heeled Boys, original release: 1971
- IMCD 43 – Traffic: Mr. Fantasy, original release: 1968
- IMCD 44 – Traffic: Shoot Out at the Fantasy Factory, original release: 1973
- IMCD 45 – Traffic: Traffic, original release: 1968
- IMCD 46 – The Triffids: Calenture, original release: 1987
- IMCD 47 – Trouble Funk: Trouble Over Here, original release: 1987
- IMCD 48 – Tom Waits: Swordfishtrombone, original release: 1983 on Island ILPS 9762
- IMCD 49 – Tom Waits: Rain Dogs, original release: 1985
- IMCD 50 – Tom Waits: Frank's Wild Years, original release: 1987
- IMCD 51 – V.A.: Intensified! Original Ska 1962-1966, original release: 1979
- IMCD 52 – V.A.: More Intensified! Original Ska 1963-1967 (Vol. 2), original release: 1980
- IMCD 53 – V.A.: Club Ska, original release: 1980
- IMCD 54 – Aswad: Live And Direct, original release: 1983
- IMCD 55 – Aswad: A New Chapter of Dub, original release: 1982
- IMCD 56 – Aswad: Hulet, original release: 1979
- IMCD 57 – Aswad: Aswad Showcase, original release: 1981
- IMCD 58 – Aswad: Aswad, original release: 1976
- IMCD 59 – Aswad: To The Top, original release: 1987
- IMCD 60 – Fairport Convention: Liege & Lief, 10/1989, original release: 1969
- IMCD 61 – Fairport Convention: Unhalfbricking, 2/1990, original release: 1969
- IMCD 62 – Free: Tons of Sobs, original release: 1969
- IMCD 63 – Free: Highway, original release: 1970
- IMCD 64 – Free: Free, original release: 1969
- IMCD 65 – Grace Jones: Slave To The Rhythm, original release: 1985
- IMCD 66 – John Martyn: The Electric John Martyn, compilation, original release: 1982
- IMCD 67 – John Martyn: Grace And Danger, original release: 1980
- IMCD 68 – John Martyn: Piece By Piece, original release: 1986
- IMCD 69 – Robert Palmer: Some People Can Do What They Like, original release: 1976
- IMCD 70 – Cat Stevens: Buddha and the Chocolate Box, original release: 1974
- IMCD 71 – Nick Drake: Bryter Layter, original release: 1971

== Island Masters, 1990s ==
- IMCD 72 – Cat Stevens: Foreigner, original release: 1973
- IMCD 73 – Free: Free Live!, original release: 1971
- IMCD 74 – Spooky Tooth: The Best of Spooky Tooth, original release: 1975
- IMCD 75 – U2: Wide Awake in America, original release: 1985
- IMCD 76 – Angel Heart (original motion picture soundtrack), original release: 1987
- IMCD 77 – An Officer and a Gentleman (original motion picture soundtrack), original release: 1986
- IMCD 78 – not issued
- IMCD 79 – not issued
- IMCD 80 – Free: Fire and Water, original release: 1970
- IMCD 81 – Free: Heartbreaker, original release: 1972
- IMCD 82 – Free: Free At Last, original release: 1972
- IMCD 83 – Murray Head: Say it Ain't So, original release: 1975
- IMCD 84 – Paul Kossoff: Back Street Crawler, original release: 1973
- IMCD 85 – John Martyn: Solid Air, original release: 1973
- IMCD 86 – John Martyn: One World, original release: 1977
- IMCD 87 – Mott The Hoople: Walkin' with a Mountain (The Best of Mott the Hoople 1969-1972), 1990
- IMCD 88 – Sparks: Mael Intuition (The Best of Sparks 1974-76), 1990
- IMCD 89 – The Wild Tchoupitoulas: The Wild Tchoupitoulas, original release: 1976
- IMCD 90 – The Slits: Cut, 1990, original release: 1979
- IMCD 91 – Nick Drake: Heaven in a Wild Flower: An Exploration of Nick Drake, 4/1990, original release: 5/1985
- IMCD 92 – Kevin Ayers, John Cale, Brian Eno, Nico: June 1, 1974, original release: 1974
- IMCD 93 – Vinegar Joe: Rock'n Roll Gypsies, original release: 1972
- IMCD 94 – Nick Drake: Pink Moon, original release: 1972
- IMCD 95 – Fairport Convention: Live Convention, original release: 1974
- IMCD 96 – not issued
- IMCD 97 – Fairport Convention: What We Did on Our Holidays, original release: 1968
- IMCD 98 – Philip Glass: Koyaanisqatsi, original release: 1983
- IMCD 99 – Jade Warrior: Floating World, original release: 1974

== Island Masters, 1990s continued ==
- IMCD 100 – Jade Warrior: Way of the Sun, original release: 1978
- IMCD 101 – Miles Jaye: Miles, original release: 1987
- IMCD 102 – Bagdad Cafe (original motion picture soundtrack), original release: 1987
- IMCD 103 – Tom Tom Club: Tom Tom Club, original release: 1981
- IMCD 104 – Cat Stevens: Teaser and the Firecat, original release: 1971
- IMCD 105 – The B-52's: Bouncing Off the Satellites, original release: 1987
- IMCD 106 – The B-52's: Party Mix, original release: 1981
- IMCD 107 – The B-52's: Mesopotamia, original release: 1982
- IMCD 108 – The B-52's: Wild Planet, original release: 1980
- IMCD 109 – The B-52's: Whammy!, original release: 1983
- IMCD 110 – V.A.: Fourth and Broadway – Built For The 90's (compilation/sampler of the 4th & Broadway label), 1990
- IMCD 111 – Jazz Warriors: Out Of Many, One People, original release: 1987 on Antilles Records
- IMCD 112 – Courtney Pine: Journey to the Urge Within, original release: 1986 on Antilles Records
- IMCD 113 – Kid Creole & The Coconuts: Cre~Olé (The Best of Kid Creole & The Coconuts), original release: 1984
- IMCD 114 – Courtney Pine: Destiny's Song + The Image of Pursuance, original release: 1988 on Antilles Records
- IMCD 115 – Andy Sheppard: Andy Sheppard, original release: 1987 on Antilles Records
- IMCD 116 – Andy Sheppard: Introductions in the Dark, original release: 1989 on Antilles Records
- IMCD 117 – Danny Thompson: Whatever Next, original release: 1989
- IMCD 118 – not issued
- IMCD 119 – not issued
- IMCD 120 – Boo-Yaa T.R.I.B.E.: New Funky Nation, original release: 1990
- IMCD 121 – not issued
- IMCD 122 – Young MC: Stone Cold Rhymin' , original release: 1989
- IMCD 123 – Def Jef: Just A Poet With Soul, original release: 1989
- IMCD 124 – Eazy-E: Eazy-Duz-It, original release: 1988
- IMCD 125 – Tone-Lōc: Lōc-ed After Dark, original release: 1989
- IMCD 126 – Overlord X: Weapon Is My Lyric, original release: 1989
- IMCD 127 – Stereo MC's: 33-45-78, 1989
- IMCD 128 – Fairport Convention: The History of Fairport Convention, original release: 1972
- IMCD 129 – Mike Heron: Smiling Men With Bad Reputations, original release: 1971
- IMCD 130 – Incredible String Band: Liquid Acrobat as Regards the Air, original release: 1971
- IMCD 131 – John & Beverley Martyn: Stormbringer!, original release: 1970
- IMCD 132 – Sandy Denny: Sandy, original release: 1972
- IMCD 133 – Sandy Denny: The North Star Grassman and the Ravens, original release: 1971
- IMCD 134 – John Martyn: London Conversation, original release: 1967
- IMCD 135 – John Martyn: Bless the Weather, original release: 1971
- IMCD 136 – Anthrax: Spreading the Disease, original release: 1985
- IMCD 137 – Julian Cope: Saint Julian, original release: 1987
- IMCD 138 – Julian Cope: My Nation Underground, original release: 1988
- IMCD 139 – Kossoff, Kirke, Tetsu and Rabbit: Kossoff, Kirke, Tetsu and Rabbit, 1992; original release: 1972
- IMCD 140 – John Cale: Fear, original release: 1974
- IMCD 141 – U2: War, original release: 1983
- IMCD 142 – Traffic: When the Eagle Flies, original release: 1974
- IMCD 143 – Jess Roden: Jess Roden, original release: 1974
- IMCD 144 – Paul Kossoff: Blue Soul (career spanning compilation), 1992; original release: 1986
- IMCD 145 – Basement 5: 1965-1980 / Basement 5 in Dub, 1992; original release: 1980
- IMCD 146 – Ultravox: Ultravox!, original release: 1977
- IMCD 147 – Ultravox: Ha! Ha! Ha!, original release: 1977
- IMCD 148 – Ultravox: Systems of Romance, original release: 1978
- IMCD 149 – Joe Cocker: Sheffield Steel, original release: 1982

== Island Masters, 1990s continued ==
- IMCD 150 – V.A.: Nice Enough To... Join In, compilation/reissue of the 1969 label samplers You Can All Join In (IWPS-2) and Nice Enough To Eat (IWPS-6)
- IMCD 151 – The Spencer Davis Group: The Best of the Spencer Davis Group featuring Stevie Winwood
- IMCD 152 – Fairport Convention: Rosie, 8/1992
- IMCD 153 – Fairport Convention: Babbacombe Lee, 8/1992
- IMCD 154 – Fairport Convention: Nine, 8/1992
- IMCD 155 – Fairport Convention: Rising for the Moon, 8/1992
- IMCD 156 – Eddie and the Hot Rods: The Best of Eddie and the Hot Rods – The End of the Beginning
- IMCD 157 – David Joseph & Hi-Tension: The Best of David Joseph & Hi-Tension
- IMCD 158 – Traffic: Smiling Phases (2xCD), 1991
- IMCD 159 – Pulp: Intro – The Gift Recordings, 1993
- IMCD 160 – Richard & Linda Thompson: I Want To See the Bright Lights Tonight
- IMCD 161 – Steve Winwood: Steve Winwood
- IMCD 162 – The Christians: The Christians
- IMCD 163 – John Martyn: Sunday's Child
- IMCD 164 – John Martyn: Sapphire
- IMCD 165 – John & Beverley Martyn: The Road To Ruin
- IMCD 166 – Fairport Convention: Angel Delight, 1993
- IMCD 167 – John Mayall featuring the Bluesbreakers: A Sense of Place, original release: 1990
- IMCD 168 – Cat Stevens: Greatest Hits
- IMCD 169 – Traffic: Best of Traffic
- IMCD 170 – PJ Harvey: 4-Track Demos
- IMCD 171 – not issued
- IMCD 172 – John Martyn: Inside Out
- IMCD 173 – John Martyn: The Tumbler
- IMCD 174 – Nico: The End..., original release: 1974
- IMCD 175 – Gavin Friday and the Man Seezer: Each Man Kills the Thing He Loves
- IMCD 176 – Gavin Friday: Adam 'n' Eve
- IMCD 177 – John Cale: Helen of Troy
- IMCD 178 – Anthrax: Persistence of Time, original release: 1990
- IMCD 179 – Anthrax: Attack of the Killer B's, original release: 1991
- IMCD 180 – John Martyn: Foundations, original release: 1987
- IMCD 181 – The Christians: Colour
- IMCD 182 – The Christians: Happy in Hell
- IMCD 183 – Traffic: On the Road
- IMCD 184 – Mica Paris: Contribution
- IMCD 185 – Stereo MC's: Supernatural
- IMCD 186 – Anthrax: Among the Living, original release: 1987
- IMCD 187 – Anthrax: State of Euphoria, original release: 1988
- IMCD 188 – Julian Cope: Peggy Suicide, original release: 1991
- IMCD 189 – Julian Cope: Jehovahkill, original release: 1992
- IMCD 190 – Will Downing: Will Downing
- IMCD 191 – Etta James: Stickin' To My Guns
- IMCD 192 – Courtney Pine: The Vision's Tale
- IMCD 193 – Courtney Pine: Within the Realms of Our Dreams
- IMCD 194 – Andy Sheppard: Soft on the Inside
- IMCD 195 – Andy Sheppard: In Co-Motion
- IMCD 196 – Nick Drake: Way To Blue – An Introduction To Nick Drake, 1994
- IMCD 197 – V.A.: Folk Routes, 1994
- IMCD 198 – Sparks: Kimono My House, original release: 1974
- IMCD 199 – Sparks: Propaganda, original release: 1974

== Island Masters, 1990s continued ==
- IMCD 200 – Sparks: Indiscreet, original release: 1975
- IMCD 201 – Sparks: Big Beat, original release: 1976
- IMCD 202 – John Cale: Slow Dazzle, original release: 1975
- IMCD 203 – John Cale: Guts, original release: 1977
- IMCD 204 – Dream Warriors: And Now the Legacy Begins
- IMCD 205 – Marianne Faithfull: Dangerous Acquaintances
- IMCD 206 – Marianne Faithfull: A Child's Adventure
- IMCD 207 – Marianne Faithfull: Blazing Away
- IMCD 208 – In the Name of the Father (original motion picture soundtrack), 1993
- IMCD 209 – Mica Paris: So Good
- IMCD 210 – Courtney Pine: To the Eyes of Creation
- IMCD 211 – U2: Boy, original release: 1980
- IMCD 212 – Will Downing: A Dream Fulfilled
- IMCD 213 – Womack & Womack: Conscience
- IMCD 214 – Melissa Etheridge: Never Enough
- IMCD 215 – not issued
- IMCD 216 – Kid Creole & The Coconuts: The Best of Kid Creole & The Coconuts
- IMCD 217 – Sandy Denny: The Best of Sandy Denny
- IMCD 218 – not issued
- IMCD 219 – The Orb: U.F.Orb, original release: 1992
- IMCD 220 – The Young Americans (original motion picture soundtrack), 1996
- IMCD 221 – Mica Paris: Whisper A Prayer
- IMCD 222 – P.M. Dawn: The Bliss Album...? (Vibrations of Love and Anger and the Ponderance of Life and Existence)
- IMCD 223 – U2: October, original release: 1981
- IMCD 224 – Steve Winwood: Keep on Running (career spanning compilation), 1991
- IMCD 225 – Marianne Faithfull: A Secret Life, 1995
- IMCD 226 – Free: The Free Story, 1995
- IMCD 227 – Gavin Friday: Shag Tobacco
- IMCD 228 – Ice Cube: The Predator
- IMCD 229 – Ice Cube: Lethal Injection
- IMCD 230 – Ice Cube: AmeriKKKa's Most Wanted
- IMCD 231 – Ice Cube: Bootlegs & B-Sides
- IMCD 232 – Ice Cube: Death Certificate
- IMCD 233 – Ian McNabb: Head Like A Rock
- IMCD 234 – The Orb: The Orb's Adventures Beyond the Ultraworld, original release: 1991
- IMCD 235 – P.M. Dawn: Of the Heart, Of the Soul and Of the Cross (The Utopian Experience)
- IMCD 236 – U2: The Unforgettable Fire, original release: 1984
- IMCD 237 – Anthrax: Live – The Island Years, 1994
- IMCD 238 – The B-52's: Dance This Mess Around (The Best of the B-52's), 1993
- IMCD 239 – Bomb the Bass: Clear, 1995
- IMCD 240 – William S. Burroughs: Spare Ass Annie and Other Tales, 1997
- IMCD 241 – Melissa Etheridge: Brave And Crazy
- IMCD 242 – Vic Reeves: I Will Cure You
- IMCD 243 – Salif Keita: Soro
- IMCD 244 – Angélique Kidjo: Ayé
- IMCD 245 – The Orb: Live '93, 1997
- IMCD 246 – Robert Palmer: Addictions Volume 2
- IMCD 247 – Tone-Lōc: Cool Hand Lōc
- IMCD 248 – U2: Live / Under a Blood Red Sky, original release: 1983
- IMCD 249 – Tom Waits: Big Time
- IMCD 250 – The Disposable Heroes of Hiphoprisy: Hypocrisy is the Greatest Luxury
- IMCD 251 – Julian Cope: The Followers of Saint Julian, 1997
- IMCD 252 – Sandy Denny: Gold Dust (The Final Concert – Live At The Royalty), 1998
- IMCD 253 – Sandy Denny: Listen Listen – An Introduction To Sandy Denny, 1999
- IMCD 254 – V.A.: Whine and Grine: Club Ska '67, 1998
- IMCD 255 – Free: Walk In My Shadow – An Introduction To Free, 1998
- IMCD 256 – John Martyn: Serendipity – An Introduction To John Martyn, 1998
- IMCD 257 – Traffic: Heaven Is In Your Mind – An Introduction To Traffic, 1998
- IMCD 258 – Black Uhuru: What Is Life – An Introduction To Black Uhuru, 1999
- IMCD 259 – John Cale: Close Watch – An Introduction To John Cale, 1999
- IMCD 260 – Julian Cope: Leper Skin – An Introduction To Julian Cope 1986-92, 1999
- IMCD 261 – The Buggles: The Age of Plastic (Remastered with three bonus tracks), 2000
- IMCD 262 – Fairport Convention: Gottle O'Geer, 1999
- IMCD 263 – Fairport Convention: What We Did On Our Holidays – An Introduction To Fairport Convention, 1999
- IMCD 264 – Traffic: Mr. Fantasy, 1999
- IMCD 265 – Traffic: Traffic, 1999
- IMCD 266 – Traffic: John Barleycorn Must Die, 1999

== Island Remasters, 2000s ==
- IMCD 267 – Cat Stevens: Mona Bone Jakon, 2000
- IMCD 268 – Cat Stevens: Tea for the Tillerman, 2000
- IMCD 269 – Cat Stevens: Teaser and the Firecat, 2000
- IMCD 270 – Richard & Linda Thompson: The End of the Rainbow – An Introduction To Richard & Linda Thompson, 2000
- IMCD 271 – Cat Stevens: Catch Bull at Four, 2000
- IMCD 272 – Cat Stevens: Foreigner, 2000
- IMCD 273 – Cat Stevens: Buddha and the Chocolate Box, 2000
- IMCD 274 – John Martyn: Solid Air, 2000
- IMCD 275 – The Slits: Cut, 2000
- IMCD 276 – Spooky Tooth: That Was Only Yesterday – An Introduction To Spooky Tooth, 2000
- IMCD 277 – Cat Stevens: Numbers, 2001
- IMCD 278 – Cat Stevens: Izitso, 2001
- IMCD 279 – Cat Stevens: Back To Earth, 2001
- IMCD 280 – Incredible String Band: Here Till Here Is There – An Introduction To the Incredible String Band, 2001
- IMCD 281 – Free: Tons of Sobs (Remastered with bonus tracks), 2001
- IMCD 282 – Free: Free (Remastered with bonus tracks), 2001
- IMCD 283 – Free: Highway (Remastered with bonus tracks), 2002
- IMCD 284 – Free: Fire And Water (Remastered with bonus tracks), 2001
- IMCD 285 – Fairport Convention: Full House (Remastered with two bonus tracks), 2001
- IMCD 286 – Free: Free Live! (Remastered with bonus tracks), 2002
- IMCD 287 – Free: Free at Last (Remastered with bonus tracks), 2002
- IMCD 288 – Free: Heartbreaker (Remastered with bonus tracks), 2002
- IMCD 289 – Fairport Convention: House Full (Live at the L.A. Troubadour) (Remastered), 10/2001
- IMCD 290 – Fairport Convention: Heyday (BBC Radio Sessions 1968-69) (Remastered with eight bonus tracks), 2001
- IMCD 291 – Fairport Convention: Liege & Lief (Remastered with two bonus tracks), 2002
- IMCD 292 – Vinegar Joe: Speed Queen of Ventura – An Introduction To Vinegar Joe, 2003
- IMCD 293 – Fairport Convention: Unhalfbricking (Remastered with two bonus tracks), 3/2003
- IMCD 294 – Fairport Convention: What We Did on Our Holidays (Remastered with three bonus tracks), 3/2003
- IMCD 295 – Burning Spear: Jah No Dead – An Introduction To Burning Spear, 2003
- IMCD 296 – Linton Kwesi Johnson: Straight To Inglan's Head – An Introduction To Linton Kwesi Johnson, 2003
- IMCD 297 – Lee "Scratch" Perry: Soul Fire – An Introduction To Lee "Scratch" Perry, 2003
- IMCD 298 – Sly & Robbie: Make Em Move / Taxi Style – An Introduction To Sly & Robbie, 2003
- IMCD 299 – Nick Drake: Way To Blue – An Introduction To Nick Drake, 2003
- IMCD 300 – Quintessence: Oceans of Bliss – An Introduction To Quintessence, 2003
- IMCD 301 – Nirvana: The Story of Simon Simopath, 2003
- IMCD 302 – Nirvana: All of Us, 2003
- IMCD 303 – Nirvana: To Markos III, 2003
- IMCD 304 – Richard & Linda Thompson: I Want To See The Bright Lights Tonight (Remastered with three bonus tracks), 2004
- IMCD 305 – Richard & Linda Thompson: Hokey Pokey (Remastered with five bonus tracks), 2004
- IMCD 306 – Richard & Linda Thompson: Pour Down Like Silver (Remastered with four bonus tracks), 2004
- IMCD 307 – Fairport Convention: Angel Delight (Remastered with one bonus track), 2004
- IMCD 308 – Fairport Convention: Babbacombe Lee (Remastered with two bonus tracks), 2004
- IMCD 309 – Fairport Convention: Rosie (Remastered with five bonus tracks), 2004
- IMCD 310 – Fairport Convention: Nine (Remastered with four bonus tracks), Aug. 2005
- IMCD 311 – Fairport Convention: Live Convention (Remastered with five bonus tracks), Aug. 2005
- IMCD 312 – Fairport Convention: Rising for the Moon (Remastered with four bonus tracks), Aug. 2005
- IMCD 313 – Sandy Denny: The North Star Grassman and the Ravens (Remastered with four bonus tracks), 2005
- IMCD 314 – Sandy Denny: Sandy (Remastered with five bonus tracks), 2005
- IMCD 315 – Sandy Denny: Like An Old Fashioned Waltz (Remastered with four bonus tracks), 2005
- IMCD 316 – Sandy Denny: Rendezvous (Remastered with five bonus tracks), 2005
- IMCD 317 – John & Beverley Martyn: Stormbringer!, 2005
- IMCD 318 – John & Beverley Martyn: The Road To Ruin, 2005
- IMCD 319 – John Martyn: London Conversation, 2005
- IMCD 320 – John Martyn: The Tumbler, 2005
- IMCD 321 – John Martyn: Bless the Weather, 2005
- IMCD 322 – John Martyn: Inside Out, 2005
- IMCD 323 – John Martyn: Sunday's Child, 2005
- IMCD 324 – Ultravox: Ultravox!, 2006
- IMCD 325 – Ultravox: Ha! Ha! Ha!, 2006
- IMCD 326 – Ultravox: Systems of Romance, 2006
- IMCD 327 – Richard & Linda Thompson: ...In Concert, November 1975 (previously unreleased live recording), 2007

== See also ==
- Lists of record labels
