= Chronicles (Free album) =

Greatest hits album by Free
- Released: September 18, 2006
- Genre: Blues-rock, hard rock
- Label: Island

Free chronology
| Songs of Yesterday (2000) | Chronicles (2006) |

Chronicles is a 2006 greatest hits album by Free.

== Track listing ==
CD 1
| No. | Title | Writer(s) | Length |
|---|---|---|---|
| 1. | "Walk in My Shadow" | Paul Rodgers | 3:34 |
| 2. | "Goin' Down Slow" | St. Louis Jimmy Oden | 8:23 |
| 3. | "I'm a Mover" | Paul Rodgers, Andy Fraser | 2:59 |
| 4. | "Moonshine" | Paul Rodgers, Paul Kossoff | 5:07 |
| 5. | "Sugar for Mr. Morrison" (stereo version) | Paul Rodgers, Andy Fraser | 3:21 |
| 6. | "I'll Be Creepin'" | Andy Fraser, Paul Rodgers | 3:30 |
| 7. | "Lying in the Sunshine" | Andy Fraser, Paul Rodgers | 3:55 |
| 8. | "Woman" | Andy Fraser, Paul Rodgers | 3:52 |
| 9. | "Songs of Yesterday" | Andy Fraser, Paul Rodgers | 3:37 |
| 10. | "Mouthful of Grass" | Andy Fraser, Paul Rodgers | 3:38 |
| 11. | "All Right Now" (single version) | Andy Fraser, Paul Rodgers | 4:16 |
| 12. | "Don't Say You Love Me" | Andy Fraser, Paul Rodgers | 6:04 |
| 13. | "Heavy Load" | Andy Fraser, Paul Rodgers | 5:22 |
| 14. | "Oh I Wept" | Paul Rodgers, Paul Kossoff | 4:30 |
| 15. | "Fire and Water" | Andy Fraser, Paul Rodgers | 4:00 |
| 16. | "Mr. Big" | Andy Fraser, Paul Rodgers, Paul Kossoff, Simon Kirke | 5:58 |
| 17. | "Be My Friend" | Andy Fraser, Paul Rodgers | 5:48 |

CD 2
| No. | Title | Writer(s) | Length |
|---|---|---|---|
| 1. | "The Stealer" | Andy Fraser, Paul Rodgers, Paul Kossoff | 3:16 |
| 2. | "The Highway Song" | Andy Fraser, Paul Rodgers | 4:18 |
| 3. | "Soon I Will Be Gone" | Andy Fraser, Paul Rodgers | 3:03 |
| 4. | "Ride on a Pony" | Andy Fraser, Paul Rodgers | 4:21 |
| 5. | "My Brother Jake" (stereo version) | Andy Fraser, Paul Rodgers | 2:58 |
| 6. | "Trouble on Double Time" (Live - Sunderland) | Andy Fraser, Paul Rodgers, Paul Kossoff, Simon Kirke | 3:39 |
| 7. | "Mr. Big" (Live - Sunderland) | Andy Fraser, Paul Rodgers, Paul Kossoff, Simon Kirke | 5:18 |
| 8. | "The Hunter" (Live - Sunderland) | Booker T. Jones, Al Jackson, Jr., Donald "Duck" Dunn, Steve Cropper, Carl Wells | 5:24 |
| 9. | "Fire and Water" (Live - Croydon) | Andy Fraser, Paul Rodgers | 4:08 |
| 10. | "Crossroads" (Live - Sunderland) | Robert Johnson | 6:01 |
| 11. | "Magic Ship" | Andy Fraser, Paul Rodgers, Paul Kossoff, Simon Kirke | 5:22 |
| 12. | "Travellin' Man" | Andy Fraser, Paul Rodgers, Paul Kossoff, Simon Kirke | 3:23 |
| 13. | "Catch a Train" | Andy Fraser, Paul Rodgers, Paul Kossoff, Simon Kirke | 3:32 |
| 14. | "Little Bit of Love" | Andy Fraser, Paul Rodgers, Paul Kossoff, Simon Kirke | 2:36 |
| 15. | "Muddy Water" | John Bundrick | 4:17 |
| 16. | "Wishing Well" | Paul Rodgers, Simon Kirke, Tetsu Yamauchi, John Bundrick, Paul Kossoff | 3:42 |
| 17. | "Easy on My Soul" | Paul Rodgers | 3:47 |
| 18. | "Heartbreaker" | Paul Rodgers | 6:14 |
