= 20th Century Masters – The Millennium Collection: The Best of Free =

Greatest hits album by Free
- Released: 6 August 2002
- Recorded: 1968–1973
- Genre: Rock; hard rock
- Label: A&M, Universal
- Producer: Free; Various

Free chronology
Universal Masters Collection (2001)	20th Century Masters – The Millennium Collection: The Best of Free (2002)	Chronicles (2004)

Professional ratings
Review scores
Source	Rating
Allmusic	4/5 stars

20th Century Masters – The Millennium Collection: The Best of Free is a greatest hits album by the band Free released through Universal Music Group. The collection spans the band's history from 1968 through 1973.

== Track listing ==
All songs were written by Andy Fraser and Paul Rodgers, except where noted.

No.	Title	Writer(s)	Length
1.	"I'm a Mover"		2:55
2.	"Walk in My Shadow"	Kossoff/Kirke/Fraser/Rodgers	3:30
3.	"I'll Be Creepin'"		3:27
4.	"Fire and Water"		3:57
5.	"All Right Now"		5:32
6.	"Heavy Load"		5:19
7.	"The Stealer"	Fraser/Rodgers/Kossoff	3:14
8.	"Mr. Big [Live]"	Fraser/Rodgers/Kossoff/Kirke	6:10
9.	"Catch a Train"	Fraser/Rodgers/Kossoff/Kirke	3:26
10.	"Wishing Well"	Fraser/Rodgers/Kossoff/Kirke/Bundrick	3:40
11.	"Come Together in the Morning"	Rodgers	4:38

== Personnel ==
- Paul Rodgers – lead vocals, rhythm guitar on (10, 11), piano
- Paul Kossoff – lead guitar, rhythm guitar
- Andy Fraser – bass guitar, piano except on (10, 11)
- Tetsu Yamauchi – bass guitar on (10, 11)
- Simon Kirke – drums
- Rebop Kwaku Baah – percussion on (10)
- John Bundrick – organ, piano on (10, 11)
