= Completely Free =

Compilation album by Free
- Released: 1982
- Genres: Blues rock, hard rock
- Length: 43:45
- Label: Island
- Producer: various

Free chronology
The Free Story (1973)	Completely Free (1982)	The Best of Free: All Right Now (1991)

Professional ratings
Review scores
Source	Rating
AllMusic	3/5 stars

Completely Free is a 1982 compilation album by the band Free. It contains all 7 singles to chart between 1970 and 1976 as well as 5 further album tracks.

== Track listing ==
1. "My Brother Jake" - 2:50
2. "Wishing Well" - 3:41
3. "Fire And Water" - 3:59
4. "I’m A Mover" - 2:55
5. "All Right Now" - 4:14
6. "Traveling Man" - 3:20
7. "I’ll Be Creepin’" - 2:48
8. "Little Bit of Love" - 2:34
9. "Mr. Big" - 5:55
10. "The Stealer" - 3:14
11. "The Hunter" - 4:14
12. "Travelin’ In Style" - 4:01
