= The Best of Free: All Right Now =

Greatest hits album by Free
- Released: 1 February 1991
- Genres: Blues rock, hard rock
- Label: Island

Professional ratings
Review scores
| Source | Rating |
|---|---|
| Allmusic | link |
| Q Magazine | 4/5 stars |

The Best of Free: All Right Now is a 1991 album by the band Free. All the tracks on this album were remixed by Bob Clearmountain. On 18 February 1991, the album was awarded a silver certification by the BPI, for UK album sales of over 60,000 units. The album entered the UK Albums Chart on 2 March 1991, it reached number 9 and stayed in the charts for 9 weeks.

Initially the plan had been that Clearmountain would remix the entire back-catalogue for a 1988 re-release on CD. Although the originals were eventually used, the tracks appeared on this compilation, brought on by the success of the song "All Right Now" when used in an advert for Wrigley's in the UK.

== Track listing ==
1. "Wishing Well"
2. "All Right Now"
3. "Little Bit of Love"
4. "Come Together in the Morning"
5. "The Stealer"
6. "Sail On"
7. "Mr. Big"
8. "My Brother Jake"
9. "The Hunter"
10. "Be My Friend"
11. "Travellin' in Style"
12. "Fire and Water"
13. "Travelling Man"
14. "Don't Say You Love Me"

== Charts ==
| Chart (1991) | Peak position |
|---|---|
| UK Albums (Official Charts) | 9 |

== Certifications ==
| Region | Certification | Certified units/sales |
|---|---|---|
| United Kingdom (BPI) | Silver | 60,000^{^} |
^{^} Shipments figures based on certification alone.
