= Little Bit of Love (Free song) =

- German cover single sleeve

Single by Free

from the album Free at Last
- B-side: "Sail On"
- Released: 5 May 1972
- Recorded: January–March 1972
- Studio: Island, London
- Genre: Blues rock
- Length: 2:32
- Label: Island
- Composers: Andy Fraser, Paul Rodgers, Paul Kossoff, Simon Kirke
- Producer: Free

Free singles chronology
"My Brother Jake" (1971)	"Little Bit of Love" (1972)	"Wishing Well" (1972)

Official audio
- "Little Bit of Love" on YouTube

"Little Bit of Love", also known as "A Little Bit of Love", is a song by English rock band Free. Written by the all four members of the band, it reached #13 on the UK singles chart and stayed on the charts for 10 weeks. Record Mirror said of the song on 13 May 1972, "Having had their fair share of the knocks and problems of fame, Free are back in full swing again. An album on the way – and this single, which should do them a lot of good. It's a relaxed put together production, good lead voice, solid beat – a philosophic song and easy to pick up in the mind. Plus that very distinctive sound." Record World on 27 May 1972 said "the strongest singles of the week come from Free, ("Little Bit Of Love" on Island)...".

After the single was released, it appeared on Free's 1972 studio album Free at Last. Since then it has appeared on various of compilation albums, including The Free Story, Completely Free and The Best of Free: All Right Now.

== Song title ==
The single was released in the United Kingdom on 5 May 1972 as "Little Bit of Love", however not all releases had exactly the same name, for instance, in German, France, Spain, etc. it was released as "A Little Bit of Love".

== Personnel ==
=== Free ===
- Paul Rodgers – vocals
- Paul Kossoff – guitar
- Andy Fraser – bass, piano
- Simon Kirke – drums

== See also ==
- List of songs recorded by Free
- Free discography
