= Free – Live at the BBC =

Free - Live at the BBC

Live album by Free
- Released: 1 April 2006
- Recorded: 1968–1971, London, England, United Kingdom
- Genres: Hard rock, blues rock
- Label: Island

Free – Live at the BBC is a live album by the English rock band, Free. It was recorded between 1968 and 1971, on BBC on various occasions; and both "in session" and "in concert". It was released in 2006, by the label, Island Records.

== Track listing ==
All tracks written by Andy Fraser & Paul Rodgers unless otherwise noted.

Disk One: In Session
No.	Title	Length
1.	"Waiting on You" (B. B. King & Ferdinand Washington; The BBC Sessions [Top Gear 15.7.1968])	2:15
2.	"Sugar for Mr Morrision" (The BBC Sessions [World Service Rhythm & Blues 15.11.1968])	3:41
3.	"I'm a Mover" (The BBC Sessions [Top Gear 17.3.1969])	3:03
4.	"Over the Green Hills" (The BBC Sessions [Top Gear 17.3.1969])	3:52
5.	"Songs of Yesterday" (The BBC Sessions [Top Gear 17.3.1969])	3:07
6.	"Broad Daylight" (The BBC Sessions [Top Gear 17.3.1969])	3:17
7.	"Woman" (The BBC Sessions [Stuart Henry 2.12.1969])	4:21
8.	"I'll Be Creepin'" (The BBC Sessions [Top Gear 8.12.1969])	2:42
9.	"Trouble on Double Time" (Paul Rodgers, Paul Kossoff, Andy Fraser & Simon Kirke; The BBC Sessions [Top Gear 8.12.1969])	3:49
10.	"Mouthful of Glass" (The BBC Sessions [Top Gear 8.12.1969])	4:41
11.	"All Right Now" (The BBC Sessions [Sounds of the Seventies 23.6.1970])	5:27
12.	"Fire and Water" (The BBC Sessions [Sounds of the Seventies 23.6.1970])	3:03
13.	"Be My Friend (Take 1)" (The BBC Sessions [Sounds of the Seventies 19.4.1971])	6:05
14.	"Be My Friend (Take 2)" (The BBC Sessions [Sounds of the Seventies 19.4.1971])	5:35
15.	"Ride on a Pony (Take 1)" (The BBC Sessions [Sounds of the Seventies 19.4.1971])	0:08
16.	"Ride on a Pony (Take 2)" (The BBC Sessions [Sounds of the Seventies 19.4.1971])	4:30
17.	"Ride on a Pony (Take 3)" (The BBC Sessions [Sounds of the Seventies 19.4.1971])	1:22
18.	"Ride on a Pony (Take 4)" (The BBC Sessions [Sounds of the Seventies 19.4.1971])	0:23
19.	"Ride on a Pony (Take 5)" (The BBC Sessions [Sounds of the Seventies 19.4.1971])	4:28
20.	"Get Where I Belong" (The BBC Sessions [Sounds of the Seventies 19.4.1971])	3:25

Disc Two: In Concert
No.	Title	Length
1.	"The Hunter" (Booker T. Jones, C. Wells, Al Jackson Jr., Donald Dunn & Steve Cropper; BBC "John Peel Sunday Concert" 15.1.1970)	5:22
2.	"Woman" (BBC "John Peel Sunday Concert" 15.1.1970)	4:25
3.	"Free Me" (BBC "John Peel Sunday Concert" 15.1.1970)	7:22
4.	"Remember" (BBC "John Peel Sunday Concert" 15.1.1970)	4:46
5.	"Fire and Water" (BBC "John Peel Sunday Concert" 2.7.1970)	3:57
6.	"Be My Friend" (BBC "John Peel Sunday Concert" 2.7.1970)	4:59
7.	"Ride on a Pony" (BBC "John Peel Sunday Concert" 2.7.1970)	4:33
8.	"Mr. Big" (Paul Rodgers, Paul Kossoff, Andy Fraser & Simon Kirke; BBC "John Peel Sunday Concert" 2.7.1970)	6:34
9.	"Don't Say You Love Me" (BBC "John Peel Sunday Concert" 2.7.1970)	4:16
10.	"Woman" (BBC "John Peel Sunday Concert" 2.7.1970)	4:16
11.	"All Right Now" (BBC "John Peel Sunday Concert" 2.7.1970)	5:10

== Personnel ==
- Paul Rodgers – vocals, piano
- Paul Kossoff – lead guitar
- Andy Fraser – bass guitar, backing vocals
- Simon Kirke – drums

== Charts ==
Chart (2006)	Peak position
UK Rock & Metal Albums (Official Charts)	15
