= Free Live! =

Live album by Free
- Released: 4 June 1971; February 2002 (reissue)
- Recorded: January 1970 – March 1971 September 13, 1970
- Venues: at Fillmore Ballroom, Fillmore North, The Locarno, Sunderland and at Fairfield Halls, Croydon, London
- Studio: Get Where I Belong is an Island Studio recording (March 1971).
- Genres: Rock, blues-rock, hard rock
- Length: 40:33
- Label: Island
- Producer: Andy Johns

Free chronology
Highway (1970)	Free Live! (1971)	Free at Last (1972)

Professional ratings
Review scores
Source	Rating
Allmusic	4.5/5 stars

Free Live! is the first live album by English rock band Free. It was rush-released by Island Records to commemorate the band, who had broken up in April 1971. Possibly because of the publicity caused by their breakup (which had also earned them a successful parting single "My Brother Jake" that same month) the album was a hit, reaching No. 4 in the UK Albums Chart. It fared less well in the US Billboard 200 however, reaching No. 89.

== Recording ==
The album (including the extra tracks) was recorded from gigs played in the UK at both The Locarno, Sunderland (January 1970) and Croydon's Fairfield Halls (September 1970), both places where Free had strong followings. Engineer Andy Johns could only use two tracks from the Sunderland gig ("The Hunter" and "All Right Now"), but used crowd noise from it frequently to create seamless links between tracks. With increased re-mastering technology available it has been possible to make others ready for the CD reissue, along with some alternate takes of tracks recorded at the second of the two Croydon sessions that were recorded. Many of the tracks on the album are from their debut Tons of Sobs (1968), as that album's rock-oriented ethos and uncomplicated production values made its material ideal for performing live.

== Track listing ==
- All tracks written by Andy Fraser & Paul Rodgers unless otherwise stated:

=== Original tracks ===
1. "All Right Now" – 6:24
2. "I'm a Mover" – 3:46
3. "Be My Friend" – 5:56
4. "Fire and Water" – 3:56
5. "Ride on Pony" – 4:30 ("Ride on a Pony" on the back of the CD reissue, but "Ride on Pony" on the cover of both the original LP and the CD)
6. "Mr. Big" (Andy Fraser, Simon Kirke, Paul Kossoff, Paul Rodgers) – 6:13
7. "The Hunter" (Booker T. Jones, C. Wells, Al Jackson Jr., Donald Dunn, Steve Cropper) – 5:29
8. "Get Where I Belong" – 4:19

With the exception of one song, Get Where I Belong, all performances are versions of album tracks.

=== Extra tracks ===
The CD reissue contains tracks not featured on the original 1971 LP release. These include "Woman" and a more rock-based version of "Trouble on Double Time" both of which are from Free (1969), nothing of which was featured on the main album itself. There are also live versions of "Walk in My Shadow" (considerably slower than the version on Tons of Sobs) and "Moonshine", which lasts for over nine minutes. The extra tracks also contain alternate live takes of "All Right Now" and "Mr. Big".

The album closes with an alternative studio version of "Get Where I Belong", which is notable for Rodgers forgetting a line and having to hum a later one in order to regain his correct place.

Extra track listing:

09. "Woman" – 4:32
10. "Walk in My Shadow" – 4:15
11. "Moonshine" – 9:08
12. "Trouble on Double Time" – 3:57
13. "Mr Big" (Alternative Take) – 5:26
14. "All Right Now" (Alternative Take) – 4:43
15. "Get Where I Belong" (Alternative Take) – 4:22

== Personnel ==
- Paul Rodgers – vocals
- Paul Kossoff – guitar
- Andy Fraser – bass guitar (all tracks), acoustic guitar and piano on "Get Where I Belong"
- Simon Kirke – drums

== Charts ==
Chart (1971)	Peak position
Australian Albums (Kent Music Report)	18
German Albums (Offizielle Top 100)	45
UK Albums (Official Charts)	4
US Billboard 200	89
