= Live at Croydon Fairfield Halls 15/6/75 =

Live album by Paul Kossoff
- Released: June 15, 1975
- Venue: Croydon Fairfield Halls
- Genre: Rock, Blues rock

Live at Croydon Fairfield Halls 15/6/75 is a live album by English rock guitarist Paul Kossoff.

== Track listing ==
All tracks are from Kossoff's solo album or from his former band Back Street Crawler.

1. The Band Plays On
2. Sidekick To the Stars
3. It's a Long Way Down To the Top
4. New York New York
5. Train Song
6. Survivor
7. Stealing My Way
8. All the Girls Are Crazy
9. Jason Blue
10. Rock 'N' Roll Junkie
11. Molten Gold
12. The Hunter
13. We Won
14. Bird Song Blues
