= Free at Last (Free album) =

Studio album by Free
- Released: June 1972
- Recorded: January–March 1972
- Studio: Island (London)
- Genres: Blues rock; rock
- Length: 36:38
- Label: Island
- Producer: Free

Free chronology
Free Live! (1971)	Free at Last (1972)	Heartbreaker (1973)

Free at Last is the fifth studio album by the English rock band Free. It was recorded between January and March 1972, and released in June that year. After breaking up in May 1971 due to differences between singer Paul Rodgers and bassist Andy Fraser, the band had reformed in January 1972.

== Recording ==
All members of the band made a concerted effort to work smoothly and efficiently for guitarist Paul Kossoff's sake as he was suffering due to an addiction to Mandrax (Quaaludes). For example, in a symbolic gesture all tracks were credited to every member of the band regardless of who actually wrote them.

The attitude to the songwriting was also vastly different; there are no outright rock songs at all, and the three songs that contain fast-paced moments all have slower, more introspective moments. Also, many fans have interpreted some of the melancholic lyrics (many of which concern people in some form of emotional distress) as referring to Kossoff.

Professional ratings
Review scores
Source	Rating
AllMusic	3.5/5 stars
Creem	B

== Reception ==
The album was reasonably successful, peaking at No. 9 in the UK Albums Chart making it their most successful UK studio album since Fire and Water (1970). The single release "Little Bit of Love" reached No. 13; despite failing to enter the top ten it was their third best selling single release at the time (it would be beaten by "Wishing Well" the following year).

However, problems began again when the band was then expected to tour to promote the album, as Kossoff was faced with a task for which he was not physically capable. Gigs had been disastrous, with Fraser remembering that "you could see people in the audience crying for him, longing for him to be all right" (quoted in Phil Sutcliffe's liner notes). Unable to continue, Fraser left the band permanently, aged just 20. Kossoff also pulled out of the tour (although not technically leaving the band) in order to seek treatment for his drug addiction.

During the period in late 1971 where the band had split, Kossoff and Kirke had formed a new band with Japanese bassist Tetsu Yamauchi and keyboard player John "Rabbit" Bundrick; Kirke asked them to join the Free tour in place of Fraser. They accepted and joined the band officially.

== Track listing ==
All tracks attributed to Fraser/Rodgers/Kossoff/Kirke unless otherwise stated.

Side one

No.	Title	Length
1.	"Catch a Train"	3:32
2.	"Soldier Boy"	2:51
3.	"Magic Ship"	5:22
4.	"Sail On"	3:05
5.	"Travellin' Man"	3:23

Side two

No.	Title	Length
6.	"Little Bit of Love"	2:34
7.	"Guardian of the Universe"	5:32
8.	"Child"	5:18
9.	"Goodbye"	5:05
Total length:		18:29

=== Extra tracks ===
1. "Burnin' (Molten Gold)" (Paul Kossoff) (Alternative take) – 5:57
2. "Honky Tonk Women" (Jagger/Richards) – 3:13
3. "Magic Ship" (Alternative mix) – 5:28
4. "Little Bit of Love" (Alternative mix) – 2:37
5. "Guardian of the Universe" (Paul Rodgers solo version) – 6:07
6. "Child" (Early mix) – 5:20

== Personnel ==
=== Free ===
- Paul Rodgers – vocals, piano
- Paul Kossoff – lead guitar, rhythm guitar
- Andy Fraser – bass guitar, acoustic guitar, piano
- Simon Kirke – drums, percussion

== Charts ==
Chart (1972)	Peak position
Australian Albums (Kent Music Report)	32
UK Albums (Official Charts)	9
