= Kossoff Kirke Tetsu Rabbit =

1972 studio album

Studio album by Paul Kossoff, Simon Kirke, Tetsu Yamauchi and Rabbit
- Released: April 1972
- Genre: Blues rock
- Length: 43:34
- Label: Island
- Producers: Kossoff, Kirke, Tetsu & Rabbit

Professional ratings
Review scores
Source	Rating
Allmusic	2/5 stars

Kossoff Kirke Tetsu Rabbit is a collaborative studio album by guitarist Paul Kossoff, drummer Simon Kirke, bassist Tetsu Yamauchi and keyboardist John "Rabbit" Bundrick, released in 1972. The album is the only release by them as a collaborative effort.

== Background ==
Recorded after Free disbanded, drummer Kirke elected to remain with guitar player Paul Kossoff forming a quartet with Bundrick and Yamauchi in 1971. Kirke has noted that although initially Kossoff appeared in good spirits and was engaged in making the album, he increasingly indulged in drugs, often falling asleep between takes or while listening to playbacks.

By April 1972, Free had reformed with Andy Fraser and Paul Rodgers making peace, and Kossoff appeared to pull it together if only briefly. Kossoff resumed taking drugs during the U.S. tour to support the last album by the original quartet Free at Last. On the eve of their Japanese tour Fraser fought with Rodgers and once again left the band, to be replaced by Yamauchi. Rodgers and Kirke elected to fill out the band bringing Bundrick on board as a member of Free for the tour and the last Free album Heartbreaker.

Well received and filled with quality songwriting, Kirke's song "Anna" was later re-recorded with Bad Company, the band that he and Rodgers established after the final breakup of Free. Also, "Hold On" was covered by Maggie Bell, which was included in the album Suicide Sal.

The album was reissued in 2007 by Ork Records, a division of Cherry Red, in a remastered edition with a 12-page booklet featuring an interview with Bundrick.

== Track listing ==
No.	Title	Writer(s)	Lead vocals	Length
1.	"Blue Grass"	Bundrick	Bundrick	5:21
2.	"Sammy's Alright"	Bundrick	Bundrick	4:05
3.	"Anna"	Kirke	Kirke	3:39
4.	"Just for the Box"	Kossoff	Instrumental	3:30
5.	"Hold On"	Kirke, Kossoff	Kirke	5:21
6.	"Fool's Life"	Bundrick	Bundrick	4:29
7.	"Yellow House"	Bundrick	Bundrick	3:23
8.	"Dying Fire"	Kirke	Kirke	4:29
9.	"I'm on the Run"	Bundrick	Bundrick	4:33
10.	"Colours"	Elliott Burgess, Kossoff	Kossoff	4:46

== Personnel ==
- Paul Kossoff – guitars, vocals on "Colours"
- John "Rabbit" Bundrick – piano, electric piano, Mellotron, organ, vocals
- Tetsu Yamauchi – bass
- Simon Kirke – drums, vocals

=== Additional personnel ===
- B.J. Cole – steel guitar on tracks 7 & 9

=== Production ===
- Produced by Paul Kossoff, Simon Kirke, Tetsu Yamauchi & John "Rabbit" Bundrick
- Engineered By Richard Digby Smith and Tony Platt
