= My Brother Jake =

Single by Free
- B-side: "Only My Soul"
- Released: April 1971
- Genre: Pop rock; blues rock
- Label: Island
- Songwriters: Andy Fraser, Paul Rodgers
- Producer: Free

Free singles chronology
"The Stealer" (1970)	"My Brother Jake" (1971)	"Little Bit of Love" (1972)

"My Brother Jake" is a song and single by English band, Free. Written by lead singer Paul Rodgers and bass guitarist Andy Fraser, it was first released in the UK in April 1971 on the Island label.

== Background and chart success ==
The song was the second chart success for Free, reaching number four in the UK Singles Chart in 1971 and remaining in the chart for 11 weeks. It was described by Dave Thompson of AllMusic as a "gorgeous knockabout" of a song. Record World said it was "their best since 'Alright Now.'"

The band performed the song on BBC's Top of the Pops on 13 May 1971.

In 1991 Andy Fraser revealed that he had originally written the song about Horace Faith, saying: "It was written about a friend, a guy called Horace Faith. He was a great singer and around that time we were great friends. It was basically a sentiment to him, but I thought 'My Brother Jake' sounded better than 'My Brother Horace'."

The song appears on the band's 1973 compilation album The Free Story and as a bonus track on the CD reissue of Highway.

== Personnel ==
- Paul Rodgers – vocals
- Paul Kossoff – lead guitar
- Andy Fraser – bass guitar, keyboards, piano, rhythm guitar
- Simon Kirke – drums, percussion
