= Heartbreaker (Free album) =

Final album by Free, featuring hit single

Studio album by Free
- Released: 19 January 1973
- Recorded: October–November 1972
- Studio: Island (London)
- Genre: Blues rock
- Length: 35:45
- Label: Island
- Producers: Free and Andy Johns

Free chronology
Free at Last (1972)	Heartbreaker (1973)	The Free Story (1973)

Singles from Heartbreaker
- 1. "Wishing Well" Released: 8 December 1972

Heartbreaker is the sixth and final album by the English rock band Free, that provided them with one of their most successful singles, "Wishing Well". It was recorded in late 1972 after bassist Andy Fraser had left the band and while guitarist Paul Kossoff was ailing from an addiction to Mandrax (Quaalude) and features a different line up from previous albums. Tetsu Yamauchi was brought in to replace Fraser, while John "Rabbit" Bundrick became the band's keyboard player to compensate for the increasingly unreliable Kossoff (singer Paul Rodgers played keyboards on the previous album 1972 Free at Last). Both Yamauchi and Bundrick had played with Kossoff and drummer Simon Kirke on the album Kossoff, Kirke, Tetsu & Rabbit during that period in late 1971 when Free had broken up for the first time. Also, several other musicians were used on the album. The album was co-produced by Andy Johns as well as Free themselves.

== Recording ==
One immediate effect of Fraser's departure was the loss of the Fraser/Rodgers songwriting partnership that had hitherto provided the bulk of the band's catalogue. Hence many of the songs were written solely by Rodgers, although two are credited to the entire band as a symbolic gesture, including the single "Wishing Well". Bundrick also wrote two of the album's eight tracks.

The track "Easy on My Soul" would later be re-recorded by Rodgers and Kirke with their subsequent band Bad Company. This version was released as the B-side to the band's second single "Movin' On".

== Reception ==
Professional ratings
Review scores
Source	Rating
AllMusic	4/5 stars
Christgau's Record Guide	C+

The album was, by Free's standards, a huge success. It became their third top-ten album in the UK, peaking at No. 9, and reached No. 47 in the US, which was also a considerable success for the band. Also, the single release "Wishing Well" became their third-most successful single, reaching No. 7 in the UK. It is widely regarded as one of their definitive songs.

== Track listing ==
Side one

No.	Title	Writer(s)	Length
1.	"Wishing Well"	Paul Rodgers, Simon Kirke, Tetsu Yamauchi, Paul Kossoff, John Bundrick	3:43
2.	"Come Together in the Morning"	Rodgers	4:38
3.	"Travellin' in Style"	Rodgers, Kirke, Yamauchi, Kossoff, Bundrick	4:01
4.	"Heartbreaker"	Rodgers	6:12

Side two

No.	Title	Writer(s)	Length
5.	"Muddy Water"	Bundrick	4:15
6.	"Common Mortal Man"	Bundrick	4:06
7.	"Easy on My Soul"	Rodgers	3:44
8.	"Seven Angels"	Rodgers	5:03

=== Extra tracks ===
9. "Wishing Well" (US mix) – 3:39 (includes additional guitar overdubs by Walden)
10. "Let Me Show You" (Single 'B' side) (Rodgers, Kirke, Yamauchi, Bundrick) – 3:01
11. "Muddy Water" (Alternative vocals) – 4:15
12. "Hand Me Down/Turn Me Round" (Prospective album track) (Bundrick) – 3:19
13. "Heartbreaker" (Rehearsal version) – 5:40
14. "Easy on My Soul" (Rehearsal version) – 8:42

== Personnel ==
Free

- Paul Rodgers – lead vocals, electric and acoustic guitars; piano (track 7)
- Simon Kirke – drums, percussion, backing vocals; rhythm guitar (track 5)
- Tetsu Yamauchi – bass guitar, percussion
- Rabbit (John Bundrick) – electric and acoustic pianos, organ, backing vocals, glockenspiel

Additional musicians

- Paul Kossoff – guitar (tracks 1 (uncredited), 2, 3, 4, 8)
- Snuffy – guitar (track 7)
- Rebop Kwaku Baah – congas (track 1)

== Charts ==
Chart (1973)	Peak position
Australian Albums (Kent Music Report)	29
Canada Top Albums/CDs (RPM)	26
UK Albums (Official Charts)	9
US Billboard 200	47
