= Fire and Water (Free album) =

Studio album by Free
- Released: 26 June 1970
- Recorded: January–June 1970
- Studio: Trident and Island, London
- Genre: Hard rock; blues rock
- Length: 35:33
- Label: Island
- Producer: Free

Free chronology
Free (1969)	Fire and Water (1970)	Highway (1970)

Singles from Fire and Water
- 1. "All Right Now" Released: 15 May 1970

Fire and Water is the third studio album by English rock band Free, released in 1970. It became the band's breakthrough album, achieving widespread commercial success as the band's first two studio albums were not successful. With the "tremendous" acclaim of Fire and Water at their backs, in the words of AllMusic, Free headlined the 1970 Isle of Wight Festival with an estimated audience of 600,000 to 700,000 attendees and "appeared destined for superstardom".

Fire and Water peaked at No. 2 on the U.K. album chart, being listed on it for a total of eighteen weeks. In contrast, neither of the band's prior releases had charted at all. Fire and Water additionally reached No. 17 in the U.S.

The album spawned the band's signature hit song "All Right Now", praised by publications such as AllMusic as a hard rock "smash powered by [Paul] Rodgers' gritty, visceral vocals". The song entered the top five within the group's native country of the United Kingdom, and also did well in other European countries such as Austria, France, and Germany. "All Right Now" remains a staple track of classic rock radio.

== Background and production ==
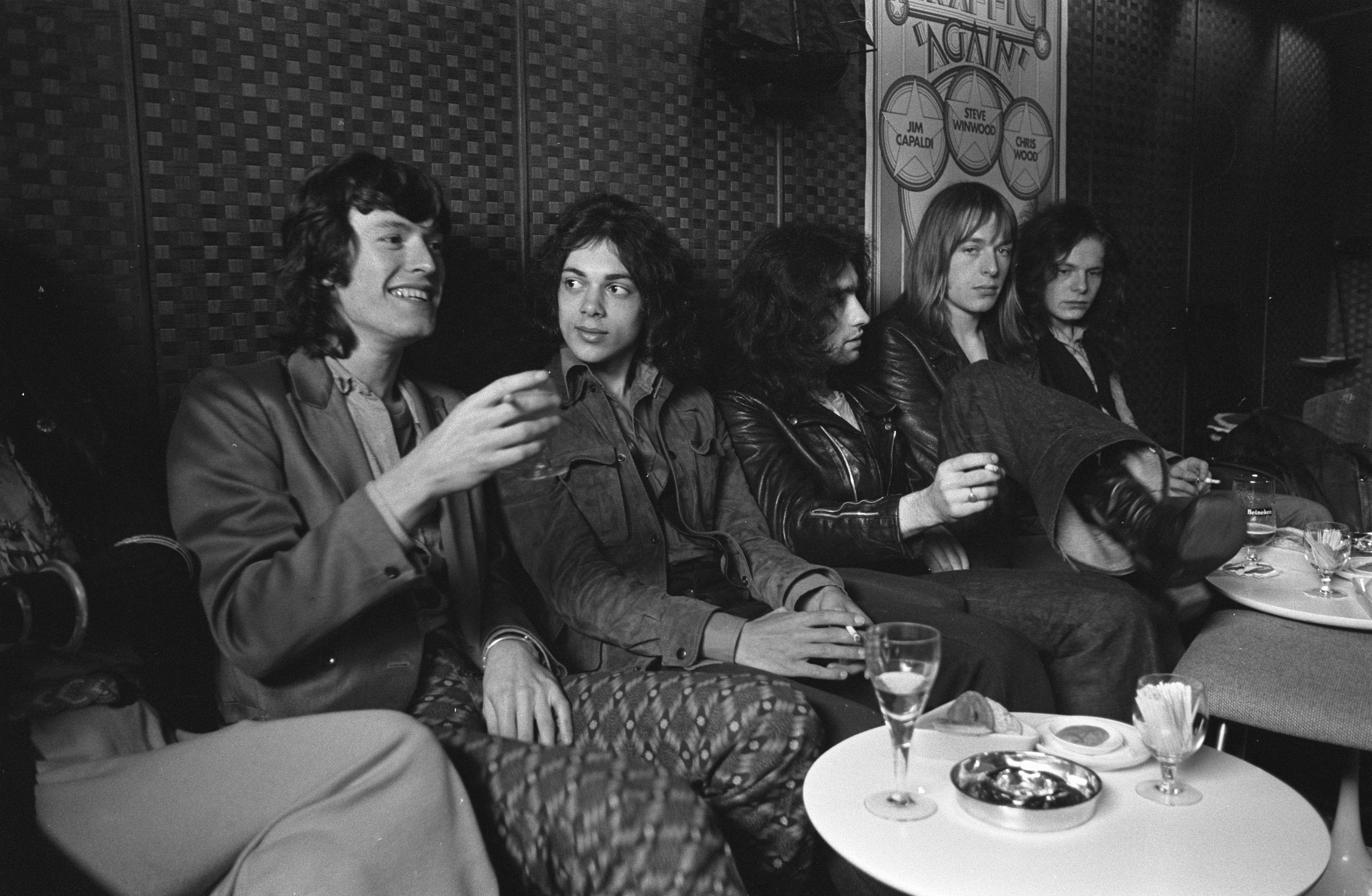
Free with Steve Winwood in Amsterdam, 1970. From left to right: Winwood, Andy Fraser, Paul Rodgers, Simon Kirke, Paul Kossoff

The band formed in London in 1968, after guitarist Paul Kossoff of the blues band Black Cat Bones saw a performance that included frontman and lead singer Paul Rodgers. Free came into being once the duo joined up with drummer Simon Kirke and bassist Andy Fraser, the latter formerly from the ranks of John Mayall's Bluesbreakers. Free's debut album, titled Tons of Sobs, came out in 1968 to a muted response. The group's eponymous 1969 follow-up, while expanding on the band's mix of styles, also failed to achieve commercial success. Neither album appeared in charts.

Free recorded Fire and Water from January to June 1970 in London, the group using the engineering facilities of Island Studios and Trident Studios. Mike Sida devised the album's cover image, with Richard Polak being the band's photographer. Free produced the work, with assistance from others.

Roy Baker contributed to the album's production, providing particular help with the audio engineering. Before getting started with Free, he had worked with groups such as Savoy Brown and the Deviants in the 1960s.

== Reception ==
Professional ratings
Review scores
Source	Rating
AllMusic	4.5/5 stars
Christgau's Record Guide	B
The Encyclopedia of Popular Music	4/5 stars
MusicHound Rock: The Essential Album Guide	3.5/5 stars
The Rolling Stone Album Guide	4/5 stars

Music critic Matthew Greenwald has written for AllMusic praising the album. He stated that by 1970 "Free presented itself to the world as a complete band, in every sense of the word", particularly with elements ranging from "Paul Kossoff's exquisite and tasteful guitar work to Paul Rodgers' soulful vocals" on display for listeners. He also positively compared the group's work with that of bands Blind Faith, Cream, and Derek and the Dominos.

== Track listing ==
All tracks written by Andy Fraser and Paul Rodgers unless otherwise stated. The details are taken from the Island CD reissue, which has accurate timings and may differ from other releases.

Side one

1. "Fire and Water" – 3:57
2. "Oh I Wept" (Rodgers, Paul Kossoff) – 4:26
3. "Remember" – 4:23
4. "Heavy Load" – 5:19

Side two

1. "Mr. Big" (Fraser, Rodgers, Simon Kirke, Kossoff) – 5:55
2. "Don't Say You Love Me" – 6:01
3. "All Right Now" – 5:32

Reissue bonus tracks

1. "Oh I Wept" – 4:22
  - Alternate vocal
2. "Fire and Water" – 4:24
  - Stereo mix
3. "Fire and Water" – 3:08
  - BBC session
4. "All Right Now" – 5:29
  - BBC session
5. "All Right Now" – 4:18
  - single version
6. "All Right Now" – 3:31
  - early version

== Personnel ==
=== Free ===
- Paul Rodgers – vocals
- Paul Kossoff – guitars
- Andy Fraser – bass, acoustic guitar, piano
- Simon Kirke – drums, percussion

== Charts ==
Chart (1970)	Peak position
Australian Albums (Kent Music Report)	25
Finnish Albums (The Official Finnish Charts)	17
German Albums (Offizielle Top 100)	30
Norwegian Albums (VG-lista)	19
UK Albums (Official Charts)	2
US Billboard 200	17

Chart (2026)	Peak position
US Top Blues Albums (Billboard)	9

== Certifications ==
Region	Certification	Certified units/sales
United Kingdom (BPI)	Silver	60,000^{‡}
^{‡} Sales+streaming figures based on certification alone.
