= Highway (Free album) =

Studio album by Free
- Released: December 1970
- Recorded: September 1970
- Studio: Island (London)
- Genre: Blues rock; country rock
- Length: 35:58
- Label: Island
- Producer: Free

Free chronology
Fire and Water (1970)	Highway (1970)	Free Live! (1971)

Highway is the fourth studio album by the English rock band Free. It was recorded extremely quickly in September 1970 following the band's success at the Isle of Wight Festival but with an attitude of relaxation, the band having achieved worldwide success with their previous album Fire and Water (26 June 1970) and the single "All Right Now". It is a low-key and introspective album compared with its predecessors.

== Recording ==
From a writing point of view Highway continued in the same vein as previous albums, with vocalist Paul Rodgers and bassist Andy Fraser collaborating on seven of the nine songs. For the most part it was the easiest of their albums to record as they had achieved their desire to have a hit single and returned to the studio with renewed confidence. Guitarist Paul Kossoff however found sudden fame more difficult to deal with, and remembered the aftermath of "All Right Now" as being "a great increase in pressure from every angle" (quoted in Phil Sutcliffe's liner notes). He preferred the more serious, weighty songs on the album such as "Be My Friend", which he saw as an antidote to the "frivolity" of "All Right Now".

It was their last album to be recorded in a position of success and security, as its failure contributed to the emotionally insecure Kossoff's growing drug addiction and the band's temporary split, from which it never truly recovered. Some, including drummer Simon Kirke, also cite the death of Kossoff's idol Jimi Hendrix (which occurred during the sessions for this album on 18 September 1970), as an important factor in his eventual breakdown.

== Reception ==
Professional ratings
Review scores
Source	Rating
AllMusic	2.5/5 stars
Christgau's Record Guide	B

Much to the band's disappointment, the album reached only No. 41 in the UK Albums Chart (the previous album Fire and Water had reached No. 2) and reached No. 190 in the US. The single release "The Stealer" failed in the UK also, but reached No. 49 in the US. Record World said of "The Stealer" that "The crucial follow-up to 'All Right Now' will most likely determine whether Free is for real or a flash in the pan. They sure sound for real—heavy number will most likely get up there." (Rodgers and Kirke re-recorded "The Stealer" with Bad Company in 1975 during the sessions for band's third album Run with the Pack (1976), but the track was not included on the album). Rod Stewart and The Faces also featured it regularly in their live set.

The album received a lukewarm critical reaction. The single release "The Stealer" had not been Island Records boss Chris Blackwell's first choice: he had wanted to release "Ride on a Pony", but this was changed at the band's insistence. Some, such as engineer Andy Johns, blamed the album cover which was aesthetically flat compared to previous releases and did not prominently display the band's name. It was believed that some fans who otherwise would have bought the album failed to notice it because of this. One UK newspaper even reported the album as being recorded by "The Highway group" stating "it's a good album for a party or discotheque, with a touch of the Rolling Stones' influence."

They returned to the studio in early 1971 and managed to record four tracks before they eventually split, after fulfilling contracted tour dates. These 'limbo' tracks included the UK No. 4 hit single "My Brother Jake"; the other three have surfaced on various other albums over the years. A notable cover version in 1971 is "Be My Friend" by Sylvia McNeill, produced by Tony Hall, on RCA 2058 (UK 45 rpm). "Be My Friend" was also covered in 1993 by Baby Animals featuring vocalist Suze DeMarchi.

== Track listing ==
All tracks written by Andy Fraser and Paul Rodgers unless otherwise stated.

Side one

No.	Title	Length
1.	"The Highway Song" (Fraser, Paul Kossoff)	4:14
2.	"The Stealer" (Fraser, Rodgers, Kossoff)	3:14
3.	"On My Way"	4:04
4.	"Be My Friend"	5:45

Side two

No.	Title	Length
5.	"Sunny Day"	3:07
6.	"Ride on a Pony"	4:17
7.	"Love You So" (Rodgers, Simon Kirke)	4:54
8.	"Bodie"	3:05
9.	"Soon I Will Be Gone"	3:01

=== Bonus tracks ===
No.	Title	Length
10.	"My Brother Jake"	2:49
11.	"Only My Soul"	2:27
12.	"Ride on a Pony (BBC Session)"	4:27
13.	"Be My Friend (BBC Session)"	5:34
14.	"Rain (Alternate version)"	3:54
15.	"The Stealer (Single mix)" (Fraser/Rodgers/Kossoff)	3:21

== Personnel ==
=== Free ===
- Paul Rodgers – vocals
- Paul Kossoff – lead guitar, rhythm guitar
- Andy Fraser – bass guitar, acoustic guitar, piano
- Simon Kirke – drums, percussion
- Andy Johns – engineer

== Charts ==
Chart (1971)	Peak position
Australian Albums (Kent Music Report)	11
German Albums (Offizielle Top 100)	43
UK Albums (OCC)	41
US Billboard 200	190
