= Wishing Well (Free song) =

- Single cover from Italian release

Single by Free

from the album Heartbreaker
- B-side: "Let Me Show You"
- Released: 8 December 1972
- Recorded: 1972
- Studio: Island, London
- Genre: Hard rock; blues rock
- Length: 3:41
- Label: Island
- Songwriters: Paul Rodgers; Simon Kirke; Tetsu Yamauchi; John Bundrick; Paul Kossoff
- Producers: Free; Andy Johns

Free singles chronology
"Little Bit of Love" (1972)	"Wishing Well" (1972)	"Travellin' in Style" (1973)

Audio
- "Wishing Well" on YouTube

"Wishing Well" is a song by the English rock band Free. It was released in December 1972 as a single and entered the UK Singles Chart on 13 January 1973, reaching number 7. The single was re-released in remixed form in 1985 and reached number 96 in the UK Singles Chart. The song is featured on the band's sixth and final studio album, Heartbreaker. It was their final hit single before the group disbanded in 1973, with Paul Rodgers and Simon Kirke going on to form Bad Company.

Matthew Greenwald of AllMusic said:

Lyrically, the song can be interpreted many ways, but it appears on the surface to be an angry message to a friend with heavy substance abuse problems who has one foot in 'the wishing well', which is possibly an analogy for 'one foot in the grave'. Next to "All Right Now", this is indeed the band's most important - and perhaps finest moment.

Record World called it a "heavy number that could bounce [Free] back to hitsville."

It was covered by Southern rock band, Blackfoot.

== Track listing ==
- 1972 7-inch single
1. "Wishing Well"
2. "Let Me Show You"
- 1985 7-inch single
1. "Wishing Well" (remixed by Bob Clearmountain)
2. "Woman" (live)
- 1985 12-inch single
1. "Wishing Well" (remixed by Chris Tsangarides)
2. "Woman" (live)
3. "Walk in My Shadow" (live)

== Charts ==
Chart (1973)	Peak position
UK Singles (Official Charts)	7
West Germany (GfK)	47
