= The Hunter (Albert King song) =

Song first recorded by Albert King in 1967

- 1969 French single picture sleeve

Song by Albert King

from the album Born Under a Bad Sign
- Released: August 1967 (album); 1969 (single)
- Recorded: June 9, 1967
- Studio: Stax, Memphis, Tennessee
- Genre: Blues
- Length: 2:43
- Label: Stax (album); Atlantic (single)
- Songwriters: Booker T. Jones; C. Wells; Al Jackson Jr.; Donald Dunn; Steve Cropper

"The Hunter" is a blues song first recorded by Albert King in 1967 for his landmark album Born Under a Bad Sign. It was written by Stax Records' house band, Booker T. and the MGs, and Carl Wells. Along with "Born Under a Bad Sign" and "Crosscut Saw", "The Hunter" is one of King's best-known and most-recorded songs. In 1969, Ike & Tina Turner's version reached the singles charts in the U.S.

== Composition and lyrics ==
"The Hunter" is a mid-tempo twenty-four bar blues in the key of A. Although the music reflects more modern trends in blues, the lyrics contain some of the swagger of the verses Willie Dixon wrote for Muddy Waters in the 1950s:

They call me the hunter, that's my name
A pretty woman like you, is my only game
I bought me a love gun, just the other day
And I aim to aim it your way
Ain't no use to hide, ain't no use to run
'Cause I've got you in the sights of my love gun

== Recording and releases ==
The song was recorded on June 9, 1967, at the Stax Records studio in Memphis, Tennessee. Albert King sings and plays lead guitar. The backing is provided by Booker T. Jones on organ, Steve Cropper on rhythm guitar, Donald "Duck" Dunn on bass, Al Jackson Jr. on drums; plus members of the Memphis Horns, Wayne Jackson on trumpet, Andrew Love on tenor saxophone and Joe Arnold on baritone saxophone.

"The Hunter" was first released on Albert King's 1967 album, Born Under a Bad Sign, which "became one of the most popular and influential blues albums of the late '60s". Writing for AllMusic, Stephen Thomas Erlewine described "The Hunter" as one of the songs that "form the very foundation of Albert King's musical identity and legacy. In 1969, the song was released as a single, but did not reach the charts. The song later appeared on various Albert King compilation albums, including King of the Blues Guitar (Atlantic Records, 1989) and The Ultimate Collection (Rhino Records, 1993).

== Ike & Tina Turner version ==
"The Hunter"
- Dutch picture sleeve

Single by Ike & Tina Turner

from the album The Hunter
- B-side: "Crazy 'Bout You Baby"
- Released: June 1969
- Length: 2:39
- Label: Blue Thumb; Liberty
- Songwriters: Booker T. Jones; C. Wells; Al Jackson Jr.; Donald Dunn; Steve Cropper
- Producer: Bob Krasnow

Ike & Tina Turner recorded their rendition of "The Hunter", which was used as the opening track for their 1969 Blue Thumb Records album of the same name. The album is one of their most blues-oriented and earned Tina Turner a Grammy nomination in 1969.

A shorter single edit was also released; a review in Record World noted: "Ike and Tina really tear it up on this, originally done by Albert King; and it's funky and great." The single reached No. 37 on Billboard's Best Selling Soul Singles chart and No. 93 on its broader Hot 100. (Note: Other charts include the Cash Box Looking Ahead chart at No. 114 and the Record World 100 Top Pops at No. 97.) The song was later included on the compilations albums The Best of Ike & Tina Turner (Blue Thumb Records, 1973) and The Ike & Tina Turner Story: 1960–1975 (Time Life, 2007).

== Other renditions ==
Canned Heat recorded a demo version in 1967, but re-recorded it as "Amphetamine Annie" (an early anti-drug song) using the same music (Boogie with Canned Heat 1968). In 1968, English rock group Free recorded the song for their debut album, Tons of Sobs. An album review noted the similarity between their version and that by Led Zeppelin, which appears during the "How Many More Times" medley on their 1969 self-titled debut album.

Also in 1968, Blue Cheer included a version on their second album Outsideinside. Music critic Mark Deming described it as "a broad but playful exercise in sexual swagger that, if nothing else, provided a lyrical conceit Kiss could use to more profitable effect nine years later". In his autobiography, Paul Stanley explained that the idea for the 1977 Kiss song "Love Gun" came from King's song. Danzig recorded "The Hunter" for their 1988 self-titled debut album, with the songwriter listed as Glenn Danzig. A review described it as "sadomasochistic, yet catchy [tune] which sounds like it could have been written by Spinal Tap".
