= Free (Free album) =

Studio album by Free
- Released: October 1969
- Recorded: 3 January – 6 June 1969
- Studio: Morgan and Trident, London
- Genre: Blues rock
- Length: 35:56
- Label: Island
- Producer: Chris Blackwell

Free chronology
Tons of Sobs (1969)	Free (1969)	Fire and Water (1970)

Free is the second studio album by English rock band Free, recorded and released in 1969. It saw the burgeoning of the songwriting partnership between Paul Rodgers and 16-year-old bassist Andy Fraser; eight of the nine songs are credited to the two.

The album performed poorly, failing to chart in the UK and in the US. The single releases, "Broad Daylight" and "I'll be Creepin'", also failed. Two songs from the album, "I'll be Creepin'" and "Woman", were later covered by the American rock band Three Dog Night.

Professional ratings
Review scores
Source	Rating
AllMusic	4/5 stars

== Track listing ==
All tracks written by Andy Fraser and Paul Rodgers unless otherwise noted.

Side one

1. "I'll Be Creepin'" – 3:27
2. "Songs of Yesterday" – 3:33
3. "Lying in the Sunshine" – 3:51
4. "Trouble on Double Time" (Fraser, Rodgers, Simon Kirke, Paul Kossoff) – 3:23
5. "Mouthful of Grass" – 3:36

Side two

1. "Woman" – 3:50
2. "Free Me" – 5:24
3. "Broad Daylight" – 3:15
4. "Mourning Sad Morning" – 5:04

== Personnel ==
- Paul Rodgers – lead vocals
- Paul Kossoff – lead guitar
- Andy Fraser – bass guitar, rhythm guitar, acoustic guitar, piano
- Simon Kirke – drums, percussion
- Chris Wood – flute on "Mourning Sad Morning"
