= Tons of Sobs =

Studio album by Free
- Released: 14 March 1969
- Recorded: October–December 1968
- Studios: Morgan, London
- Genre: Blues rock
- Length: 38:55
- Label: Island
- Producer: Guy Stevens

Free chronology
Tons of Sobs (1969)	Free (1969)

Tons of Sobs is the debut studio album by the English rock band Free, released in the UK on 14 March 1969. While the album failed to chart in the UK, it reached number 197 in the US. Free are cited as one of the definitive bands of the British blues boom of the late 1960s, even though this is the only album of their canon that can strictly be called blues rock. It had the band's first minor hit "I'm a Mover", which was released as a single in December 1968.

== Recording ==
Free were a new band when they recorded Tons of Sobs, and they were young; all were teenagers and the youngest, Andy Fraser, was 16. They had achieved a following through constant touring, and their debut album consisted mostly of their live set list. With the band signed to Chris Blackwell's Island Records, Guy Stevens was hired to produce the album. He took a minimalist attitude to production due to the extremely low budget of about £800, and created a raw, raucous sound – although the relative inexperience of the band possibly contributed to this. The album is in marked contrast to the band's later albums in terms of production. The simple nature of the recording meant that many tracks translated well to a live setting and several songs from this album were still performed even when the band had written and recorded many more for subsequent LP's.

The majority of the album was recorded over a few days in October 1968. Originally slated for a November release, the album was delayed until early 1969 due to the late addition of the cover of "The Hunter". The song was a mainstay of their live sets and was recorded at a December 1968 session at Stevens' insistence.

Professional reviews
Review scores
Source	Rating
AllMusic	4.5/5 stars
Rolling Stone	(negative)

== Track listing ==
Side one

1. "Over the Green Hills (Pt. 1)" (Paul Rodgers) – 0:49
2. "Worry" (Rodgers) – 3:26
3. "Walk in My Shadow" (Rodgers) – 3:29
4. "Wild Indian Woman" (Andy Fraser, Rodgers) – 3:39
5. "Goin' Down Slow" (James Burke Oden) – 8:20

Side two

1. "I'm a Mover" (Fraser, Rodgers) – 2:56
2. "The Hunter" (Booker T. Jones, Carl Wells, Donald Dunn, Al Jackson Jr., Steve Cropper) – 4:13
3. "Moonshine" (Rodgers, Paul Kossoff) – 5:04
4. "Sweet Tooth" (Rodgers) – 4:54
5. "Over the Green Hills (Pt. 2)" (Rodgers) – 1:58

Bonus tracks

Recent CD reissues contain several bonus tracks:

11. "I'm a Mover" (BBC session) (Fraser, Rodgers) – 3:04
12. "Waitin' on You" (BBC session) (B.B. King, Ferdinand Washington) – 2:15
13. "Guy Stevens Blues" (Fraser, Rodgers, Simon Kirke, Kossoff) – 4:39
14. "Moonshine" (Alternative vocal) (Rodgers, Kossoff) – 5:09
15. "Sweet Tooth" (Early take and alternative vocal) (Rodgers) – 4:53
16. "Visions of Hell" (Fraser, Rodgers) – 3:46
17. "Woman by the Sea" (Fraser, Rodgers) – 3:30
18. "Over the Green Hills" (BBC session) (Rodgers) – 3:51

== Personnel ==
- Paul Rodgers – vocals
- Paul Kossoff – guitar
- Andy Fraser – bass guitar
- Simon Kirke – drums

Additional personnel

- Steve Miller – piano
- Guy Stevens – producer
- Andy Johns – engineer
- Mike Sida – front cover photograph
- Richard Bennett Zeff – inside cover photography

== Charts ==
Chart (1969)	Peak position
US Billboard 200	197

== Bibliography ==
- Strong, Martin C. The Great Rock Discography, 6th edition. Edinburgh: Canongate Books 1994, 2002. pp. 392–3.
- Sutcliffe, Phil. Notes to Tons of Sobs by Free. Universal Island Records Ltd. 1968, 2001.
