= Andy Fraser =

English bass guitarist (1952–2015)

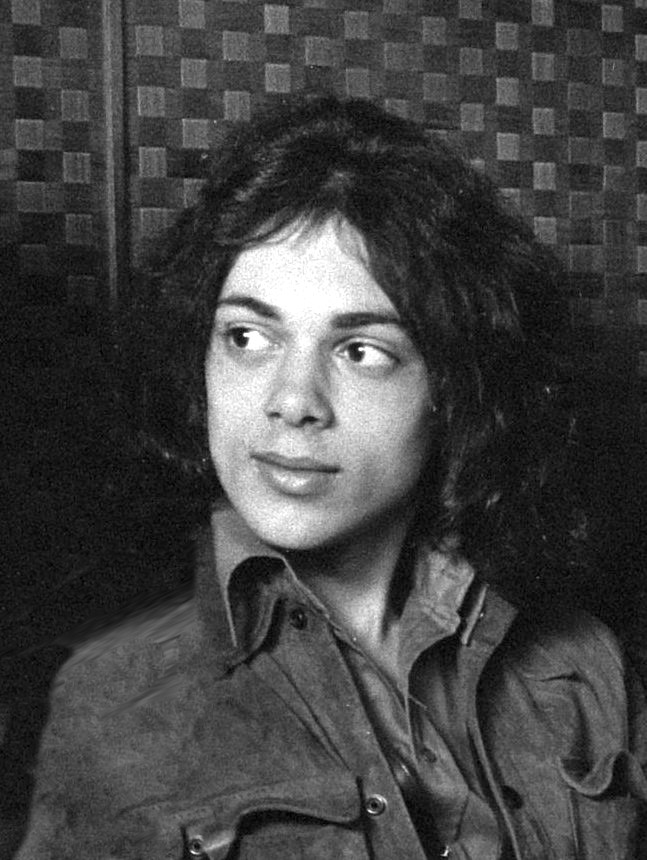
- Fraser in 1970

Background information
- Born: Andrew McIan Fraser; 3 July 1952; Paddington, London, England
- Died: 16 March 2015 (aged 62) Temecula, California, US
- Genres: Hard rock; blues rock; funk rock
- Occupations: Musician; songwriter
- Instruments: Bass guitar; piano
- Years active: 1968–2015
- Formerly of: Free; John Mayall & the Bluesbreakers; Toby; Sharks

Andrew McIan Fraser (3 July 1952 – 16 March 2015) was an English musician and songwriter, best known as the bassist and co-composer for the rock band Free, which he helped found in 1968 when he was 15. He is known for writing the hit songs "All Right Now" and "Every Kinda People". He also founded the rock band Sharks after leaving Free in 1972.

== Peak years (1960s and 1970s) ==
Fraser was born in the Paddington area of Central London to a Barbadian-Guyanese father of mixed European and African ancestry, and an English mother. His parents later divorced and, along with his three siblings, he was raised by his mother.

He began playing the piano at the age of five. He was trained classically until twelve, when he switched to guitar. By thirteen he was playing in East End, West Indian clubs and after being expelled from St Clement Danes Grammar School in 1968 at the age of 15, enrolled at Hammersmith College of Further Education. There, another student, Sappho Korner, introduced him to her father, pioneering blues musician and radio broadcaster Alexis Korner, who became a father figure to him. Shortly thereafter, upon receiving a telephone call from John Mayall who was looking for a bass player, Korner suggested Fraser; still only 15, he was now in a professional band and earning £50 a week, although it ultimately turned out to be a brief tenure.

Korner was also instrumental in Fraser's next move, to the influential band Free, which consisted of Paul Rodgers (vocals), Paul Kossoff (guitar) and Simon Kirke (drums). Fraser produced and co-wrote the song "All Right Now" with Rodgers, a No. 1 hit in over 20 territories and recognised by ASCAP in 1990 for garnering over 1,000,000 radio plays in the United States by late 1989. In October 2006, a BMI London Million-Air Award was given to Rodgers and Fraser to mark over 3 million radio and television plays of "All Right Now". Simon Kirke later recalled: "'All Right Now' was created after a bad gig in Durham. We finished our show and walked off the stage to the sound of our own footsteps. The applause had died before I had even left the drum riser. It was obvious that we needed a rocker to close our shows. All of a sudden the inspiration struck Fraser and he started bopping around singing 'it's all right now'. He sat down and wrote it right there in the dressing room. It couldn't have taken more than ten minutes."

Fraser also co-wrote two other hit singles for Free, "My Brother Jake" and "The Stealer". Free initially split in 1971, and Fraser formed a trio, Toby, with guitarist Adrian Fisher, and drummer Stan Speake. Material was recorded but not released, and Fraser re-joined Free in December 1971. He left for the second time in June 1972.

After leaving Free, Fraser formed Sharks with vocalist Snips (later Baker Gurvitz Army), guitarist Chris Spedding and drummer Marty Simon. Despite being well received by the critics, especially for Spedding's tasteful guitar work (Crawdaddy Lead Review, Bruce Malamut Vol. 27, 1973), Fraser left after their debut album, First Water (1973).

He then formed the Andy Fraser Band, a trio with Kim Turner on drums and Nick Judd on keyboards. They released two albums, Andy Fraser Band and In Your Eyes, both in 1975, before that also folded. Attempts to form a group with Frankie Miller ('The Rumbledown Band') came to nothing, and Fraser relocated to California to concentrate on songwriting. He wrote hits for Robert Palmer, Joe Cocker, Chaka Khan, Rod Stewart and Paul Young.

He married Henrietta ("Ri") from Australia in 1974. In that year their first daughter Hannah was born in England, and after moving to California they had a second child in 1977.

Fraser's most famous compositions remain the Free song "All Right Now", and "Every Kinda People", which Robert Palmer recorded in 1978 for his Double Fun album.

"(All Right Now)...I don’t know if it’s actually the song I’d like to be remembered by, though. Every Kind Of People, which was one of the first songs I wrote when I moved to the States and which my dear, much-missed friend Robert Palmer, who I’d known from even before the Vinegar Joe days, ended up performing… that’s one I’m particularly proud of. And then of course there’s Heavy Load, Be My Friend, Soon I Will Be Gone, Sail On… I still love a lot of those old Free songs." - Andy Fraser

== Later period (1980s–2015) ==
In 1984, Fraser released another album of his own. Fine, Fine Line featured ex-Back Street Crawler drummer Tony Braunagel, Bob Marlette (keyboards), Michael Thompson (guitar) and David Faragher (bass), with Fraser contributing vocals. One of the songs on the album, "Do You Love Me" — a cover of the Berry Gordy Jr.-penned song – spent five weeks on the Billboard Hot 100, peaking at number 82 in March 1984.

Having been diagnosed with HIV, he was later diagnosed with Kaposi's sarcoma, a form of cancer that had been very rare until the onset of the AIDS epidemic. This timeline was called into question by Fraser's subsequent revelation that he was gay.

He played bass with former Free colleague Paul Rodgers at Woodstock '94, but otherwise kept a low profile until 2005, when a new release, Naked and Finally Free, appeared. At the time of the new album's release, Fraser was interviewed by Dmitry M. Epstein for the DME website and revealed: "To be quite honest, I never thought of myself as a bass-player. I actually only used the bass-guitar because the other kids in our school-band wanted to be the singer, or drummer, or guitarist. I have always thought of myself as doing whatever was necessary to make the whole thing work. I'm happy adding piano, or tambourine, or anything that helped".

In early 2006, writing for Vintage Guitar magazine, Tom Guerra conducted a comprehensive interview with Fraser, covering his career, influences and instruments and, in April, Fraser responded to the revival of interest in his music by announcing two rare live shows at Southern California's Temecula Community Arts Theatre on 4 May. The shows, accompanied by an eight-piece band, were his first live performances since the 1994 Woodstock reunion.

In 2008, he wrote and sang the song "Obama (Yes We Can)", to support the campaign to elect Barack Obama as president of the United States.

In May 2010, Fraser was interviewed for BBC Two's documentary series titled Rock 'n' Roll. The project includes a five-part documentary, narrated by British music show anchor-man Mark Radcliffe plus online and radio content. "The documentary aims to explain the success of some of the greatest bands of the past 50 years, including the Who, the Police, the Doors, Bon Jovi and the Foo Fighters".

In mid-2013, Fraser played a supporting role as bassist in the band of protege Tobi Earnshaw for a short series of UK dates. Accompanying Tobi Earnshaw and Fraser was a veteran ally, guitarist Chris Spedding. Fraser produced and mentored Earnshaw on a number of album releases.

== Death ==
Fraser died on 16 March 2015 at his home in California of a heart attack caused by atherosclerosis. He was survived by his daughters Hannah and Jasmine, and ex-wife Henrietta.

== Discography ==
=== with Free ===
- Tons of Sobs (1969)
- Free (1969)
- Fire and Water (1970)
- Highway (1970)
- Free Live! (1971)
- Free at Last (1972)
- Songs of Yesterday (5-CD box set, 2000)
- Free – Live at the BBC (2-CD set, 2006)

=== with Sharks ===
- First Water (1973)
- "Broke A Feeling" (Island single) (1973)
- "Ol' Jelly Roll" (MCA single) (1973)

=== with Andy Fraser Band ===
- Andy Fraser Band (1975)
- ...In Your Eyes (1975)

=== Solo ===
- Fine Fine Line (1984)
- Naked... and Finally Free (2005)
- On Assignment (2005)
