= Paul Kossoff =

English guitarist (1950–1976)

- Kossoff performing with Free at Randwick Racecourse, 1971

Background information
- Born: Paul Francis Kossoff; 14 September 1950; Hampstead, London, England
- Died: 19 March 1976 (aged 25) en route to New York, US
- Genres: Rock; blues; blues rock; hard rock
- Occupation: Guitarist
- Years active: 1968–1976
- Labels: Island; Atlantic; Atco
- Formerly of: Free; Leaf Hound; Black Cat Bones; Back Street Crawler; Kossoff/Kirke/Tetsu/Rabbit
- Website: paulkossoff.webs.com

Paul Francis Kossoff (14 September 1950 – 19 March 1976) was an English guitarist, best known as the co-founder and guitarist of the rock band Free. In 2010, he was ranked number 51 in Rolling Stone's list of the "100 Greatest Guitarists of All Time".

== Early years ==
Kossoff was born on 14 September 1950 in Hampstead, London, the son of Margaret (née Jenkins) and actor David Kossoff. His uncle was the broadcaster Alan Keith and he was a cousin of the judge Brian Keith and the model Linda Keith.

At age nine, Kossoff started classical guitar lessons with Blanche Monroe. His classical guitar training continued until he was fifteen. In December 1965, he saw Eric Clapton with John Mayall's Bluesbreakers at The Refectory, Golders Green, North West London. This encounter inspired him to purchase a Gibson Les Paul guitar. During 1966, Kossoff worked as a junior salesman at Selmer's Music Shop in Charing Cross Road. He received lessons from session guitarist Colin Falconer, who worked in the guitar department at Selmer's.

In 1966, Kossoff joined the Chicago-style blues band Black Cat Bones. The band played with touring blues piano player Champion Jack Dupree, often supporting Fleetwood Mac and other gigs with Fleetwood Mac co-founder Peter Green. Kossoff's bandmate in Black Cat Bones was drummer Simon Kirke and the two went on to play on Dupree's April 1968 album When You Feel the Feeling You Was Feeling.

== Free ==
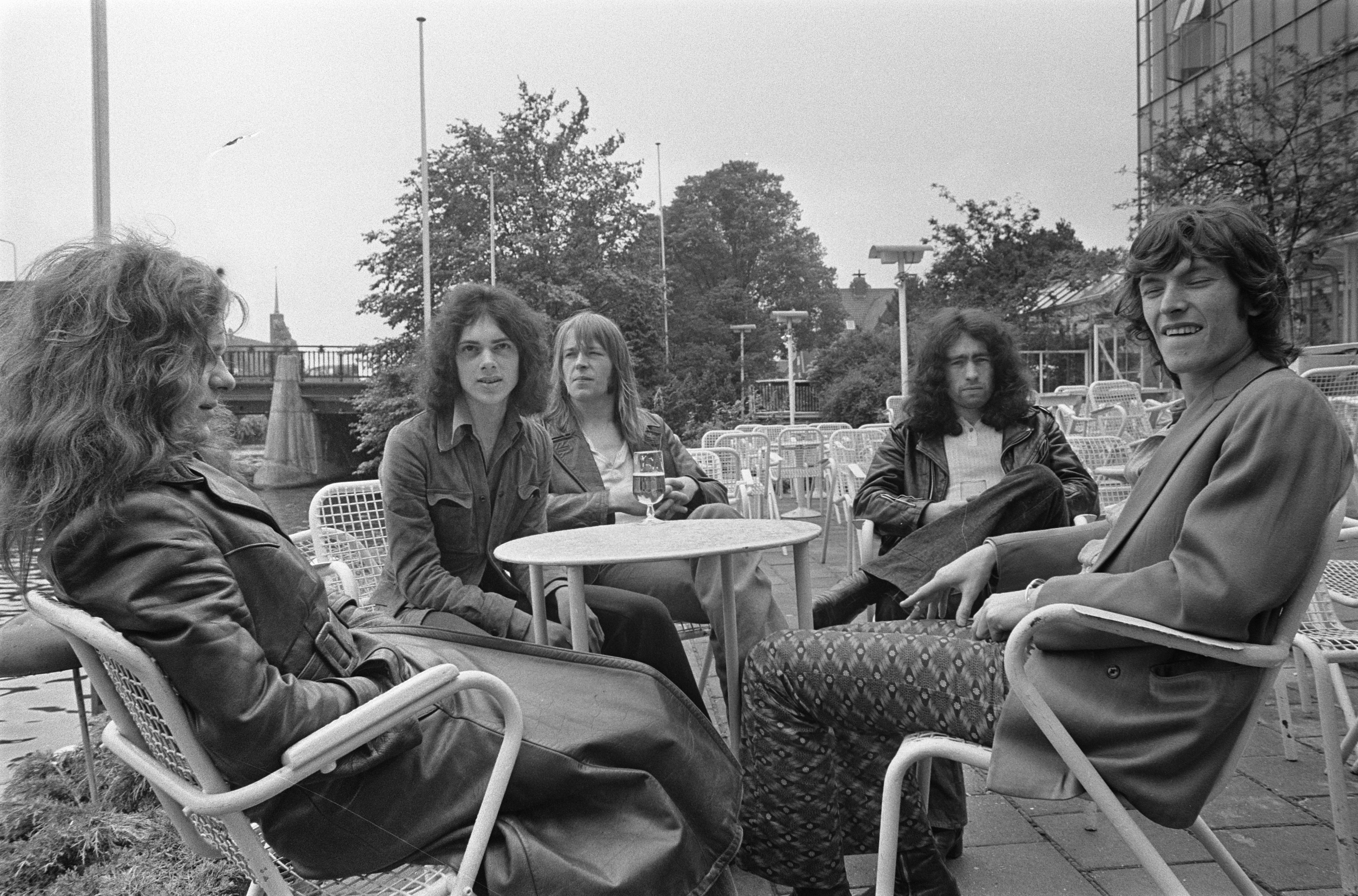
Free in Amsterdam in 1970: Paul Kossoff, Andy Fraser, Simon Kirke, Paul Rodgers and Steve Winwood

In April 1968, Kossoff and Kirke teamed up with Paul Rodgers (vocals) and Andy Fraser (bass) to form Free. They toured for two years, during which they recorded two albums: Tons of Sobs (1968) and Free (1969). Both albums showcased the band's blues- and soul-influenced sound, a style that was in contrast to some of their progressive and heavier counterparts at the time.

Success came in 1970 when their third album, Fire and Water (1970), spawned the hit "All Right Now". The band played the Isle of Wight festival to both audience and critical acclaim, followed by sold-out tours in the UK, Europe and Japan.

However, after the release of the next album, Highway (1970) and its relatively poor sales, band pressures led to a split. The live album Free Live! was recorded in 1970 and released in 1971 as a farewell record.

Kossoff and Kirke teamed up with Texan keyboard player John "Rabbit" Bundrick and Japanese bass player Tetsu Yamauchi to release the 1971 album Kossoff, Kirke, Tetsu and Rabbit. Rodgers (with 'Peace') and Fraser (with 'Toby') pursued unsuccessful solo projects.

Free reformed and released the album Free at Last (1972). Following its release, Fraser decided he had had enough and quit to form 'Sharks' (with Chris Spedding). Free drafted Tetsu and Rabbit for the album Heartbreaker (1973) after which the group disbanded.

=== Songwriting ===
Kossoff co-wrote several Free songs, including "Oh I Wept" and "Mr Big" on the Fire and Water album.

== After Free ==
Rodgers and Kirke went on to form the successful supergroup Bad Company.

Kossoff released a solo album, Back Street Crawler (1973). He then accompanied John Martyn on a 1975 tour.

Kossoff then assembled a group called Back Street Crawler, which released two albums: The Band Plays On in 1975 and 2nd Street in 1976. Recordings from one of the band's UK concerts in 1975 were first released in 1983 on the album Live at Croydon Fairfield Halls 15/6/75.

Kossoff's guitar playing was also much in demand for session work and he contributed solos on several albums including: Martha Veléz's Fiends and Angels (1969); Michael Gately's Gately's Cafe (1971) and Mike Vernon's 1971 album Bring It Back Home; Uncle Dog's Old Hat (1972); Jim Capaldi's Oh How We Danced (1972) and Short Cut Draw Blood (1975); The Amazing Blondel's Mulgrave Street (1974).

He also played on four demos by Ken Hensley of Uriah Heep, (eventually released on the 1994 album titled From Time to Time), and three tracks that appear on the CD-only issue of John Martyn's Live at Leeds album from 1975.

=== Posthumous releases ===
In 1977, career retrospective Koss was released and in 1986 Blue Soul.

The late 1990s saw a renewed interest in Kossoff and Blue Soul was re-released, as well as the five-disc Free box set Songs of Yesterday.

In 2006, an unreleased guitar solo surfaced on the title track to the album All One by David Elliot, who recorded with Kossoff in the 1970s.

In 2011 a selection of early recordings Kossoff made with Black Cat Bones was released on the album Paul's Blues.

=== Books ===
In 2000, a Free biography entitled Heavy Load: The Story of Free was published. 2017 saw publication of the Paul Kossoff biography Paul Kossoff: All Right Now – The Guitars, The Gear, The Music.

== Personal life ==
=== Drug use ===
Kossoff used drugs from age 15. Simon Kirke has said "he clearly had a predisposition". He used Mandrax among other drugs. Paul Rodgers has said Kossoff was healthy and playing well in 1973 although this is disputed, but that he wonders about the company that Kossoff kept, and felt that "Koss was just too sensitive for this world."

Kossoff's drug use made him unreliable in the latter stages of Free. Andy Fraser noted "he felt intimidated by those other guitarists, and when people began speaking of him in terms of Clapton and so on, it frightened him. Drugs were a defence, his excuse".

=== Death ===
Kossoff's unhappiness following the break-up of Free and his drug addictions contributed to a drastic decline in his health. In a BBC website page about the 1970 death of Jimi Hendrix, Simon Kirke said that Kossoff idolised Hendrix and never really recovered from his death.

Kossoff died on a flight from Los Angeles to New York City on 19 March 1976 from a pulmonary embolism after a blood clot in his leg moved to his lung, while touring America with Back Street Crawler. His body was returned to England and cremated at Golders Green Crematorium in North West London. His epitaph in the Summerhouse there reads: "All right now".

== Legacy ==
One of Kossoff's guitars, a 1957 Fender Stratocaster, was bought by Dave Murray of the heavy metal band Iron Maiden; Murray paid £1,400 for the guitar in 1976 (equivalent to £9,434 in 2025).

In 2012, one of his most famous and iconic guitars, a 1959 Gibson Les Paul (the Kossoff Burst), was recreated and made into a limited edition reissue by Gibson and named the 'Paul Kossoff 1959 Les Paul Standard'.

In December 2015, Bonhams listed for auction a Gibson Les Paul Standard owned by Kossoff from 1970 to 1976.

In April 2017, Guitar magazine featured the 'stripped' Gibson Les Paul that Kossoff played at the Isle of Wight Festival in 1970. Kossoff sold the guitar to Mike Gooch (of the punk/power pop band 'Wish') and in May 1994 it was sold for £12,000 at Christie's.

== Selected discography ==
=== Free ===
- Tons of Sobs (1969)
- Free (1969)
- Fire and Water (1970)
- Highway (1970)
- Free Live! (1971)
- Free at Last (1972)
- Heartbreaker (1973)
- Songs of Yesterday (5-CD box set, 2000)
- Free – Live at the BBC (2-CD set, 2006)

=== Paul Kossoff, Simon Kirke, Tetsu Yamauchi, John "Rabbit" Bundrick ===
- Kossoff Kirke Tetsu Rabbit (1972)

=== Back Street Crawler ===
- The Band Plays On (1975)
- 2nd Street (1976)
- Live at Croydon Fairfield Halls 15/6/75 (1983) 2-LP

(Note: after Kossoff's death, the band—now called simply 'Crawler'—made further albums)

=== Solo ===
- Back Street Crawler (1973)
- Koss (1977) 2-LP compilation
- Blue Soul (1986) 2-LP compilation
