= Simon Kirke =

English drummer (born 1949)

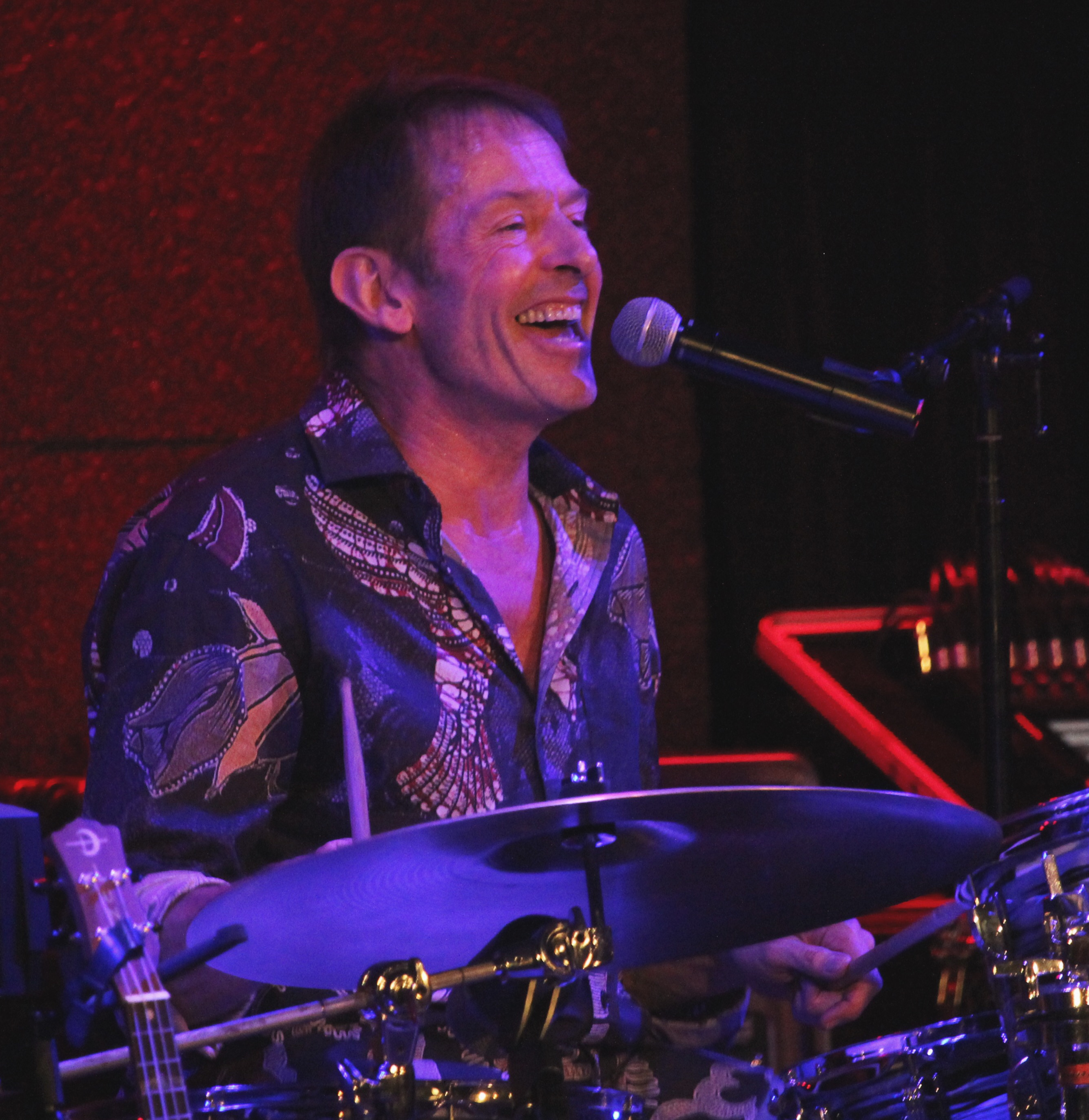
- Kirke performing in 2016

Background information
- Born: Simon Frederick St George Kirke; 28 July 1949 (age 77); Lambeth, London, England
- Origin: Westminster, London, England
- Genres: Hard rock; blues rock; blues
- Occupation: Musician
- Instruments: Drums; vocals
- Years active: 1968–present
- Formerly of: Black Cat Bones; Free; Bad Company; Ringo Starr & His All-Starr Band
- Website: officialsimonkirke.com
- Children: Jemima Kirke (daughter); Lola Kirke (daughter); Domino Kirke (daughter)

Simon Frederick St George Kirke (born 28 July 1949) is an English musician who was the co-founder, drummer, and only continuous member of the rock supergroup Bad Company. Prior to forming Bad Company, he was the drummer and co-founder of Free.

== Life and career ==
Kirke was born in Lambeth, South London, the son of Vivian Percy Kirke and Olive May (née Pollard) Kirke, who married in 1948. Simon's father was from a junior branch of a family of Nottinghamshire landed gentry, and descended on his mother's side from the Gibson-Craig baronets.

Kirke spent his early years living in the countryside of Shropshire. Leaving school at 17, he returned to London and set about finding a drumming job in the booming blues scene. After a fruitless 22 months he was resigned to returning to the country when he met Paul Kossoff, who was playing in a band called Black Cat Bones. Kirke was offered the drumming position in the band, and played with Black Cat Bones for six months.

Kirke and Paul Kossoff left the band and with Paul Rodgers and Andy Fraser formed Free. Their biggest hit, "All Right Now", was a number one in more than 20 territories and was acknowledged by ASCAP (American Society of Composers, Authors, and Publishers) in 1990 as having received more than one million radio plays in the US by late 1989. In 2000, an award was given to Paul Rodgers by the British music industry when "All Right Now" passed two million radio plays in the UK.

By April 1972, Free had reformed with Andy Fraser and Paul Rodgers making peace, and Kossoff appeared to pull it together if only briefly. Kossoff resumed taking drugs during the US tour to support the last album by the original quartet Free at Last. On the eve of their Japanese tour Fraser fought with Rodgers and once again left the band, to be replaced by Tetsu Yamauchi. Rodgers and Kirke elected to fill in the band bringing John "Rabbit" Bundrick on board as a member of Free for the tour and the last Free album, Heartbreaker. After the disbanding of Free in 1973, Kirke and Rodgers again teamed up to form Bad Company. They were joined by guitarist Mick Ralphs (Mott the Hoople) and bassist Boz Burrell (King Crimson).

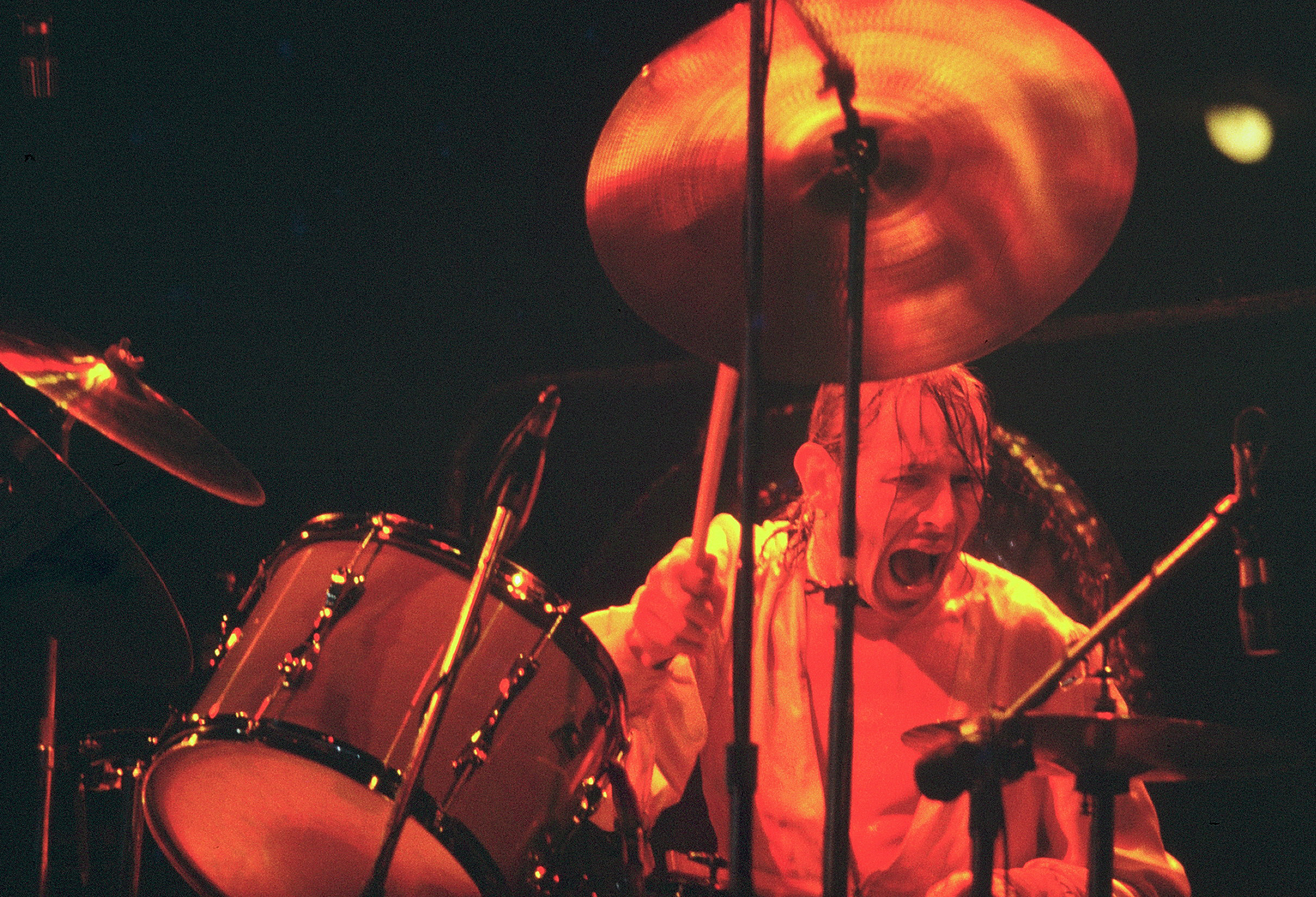
Kirke performing in 1976

After Bad Company disbanded in 1982, Kirke joined a band called Wildlife. They toured in support of the Michael Schenker Group around this time in the UK. Wildlife's self-titled album was mostly written by Steve and Chris Overland, produced by former Bad Company bandmate Ralphs, and featured Kirke as their drummer (and saxophonist on his self-written song "Charity"). Despite being signed to Led Zeppelin's label, Swan Song Records, and Kirke's high-profile involvement, the album failed to sell. Wildlife's core members, brothers Chris and Steve Overland went on to greater success with the band FM.

Kirke returned to Bad Company when the band reformed in 1986. As well as touring with Ringo Starr's All Star Band on three occasions, he is an accomplished songwriter, releasing Seven Rays of Hope in 2005. He toured with Bad Company in 2009. He has been playing with New York City rock band Zeta Vang as a side project.

Kirke is a governor on the board of NARAS (the Grammy Award Committee).

in 2025, Kirke was inducted into the Rock and Roll Hall of Fame as a member of Bad Company.

== Personal life ==
He lives in Manhattan with his wife Maria Angelica Kirke and has three children: Domino, Jemima, and Lola Kirke.

Kirke is on the board of Road Recovery Foundation, which helps teenagers recover from addiction.

== Discography ==
=== Free ===
- Tons of Sobs (1969)
- Free (1969)
- Fire and Water (1970)
- Highway (1970)
- Free Live! (1971) (live)
- Free at Last (1972)
- Heartbreaker (1973)

=== Kossoff Kirke Tetsu Rabbit ===
- Kossoff Kirke Tetsu Rabbit (1971)

=== Bad Company ===
- Bad Company (1974)
- Straight Shooter (1975)
- Run With the Pack (1976)
- Burnin' Sky (1977)
- Desolation Angels (1979)
- Rough Diamonds (1982)
- 10 from 6 (1985) (compilation)
- Fame and Fortune (1986)
- Dangerous Age (1988)
- Holy Water (1990)
- Here Comes Trouble (1992)
- What You Hear Is What You Get: The Best of Bad Company (1993) (live)
- Company of Strangers (1995)
- Stories Told & Untold (1996)
- The 'Original' Bad Co. Anthology (1999) (compilation CD)
- In Concert: Merchants of Cool (2002)
- Live in Albuquerque 1976 (2006)
- Hard Rock Live (2010)
- Live at Wembley (2011)
- Live in Concert 1977 & 1979 (2016)

=== Wildlife ===
- Wildlife (1983)

=== Lonerider ===
- Attitude (2019)
- Sundown (2022)

=== Solo ===
- Seven Rays of Hope (2005)
- Filling the Void (2011)
- All Because of You (2017)
