= Free (band) =

English rock band

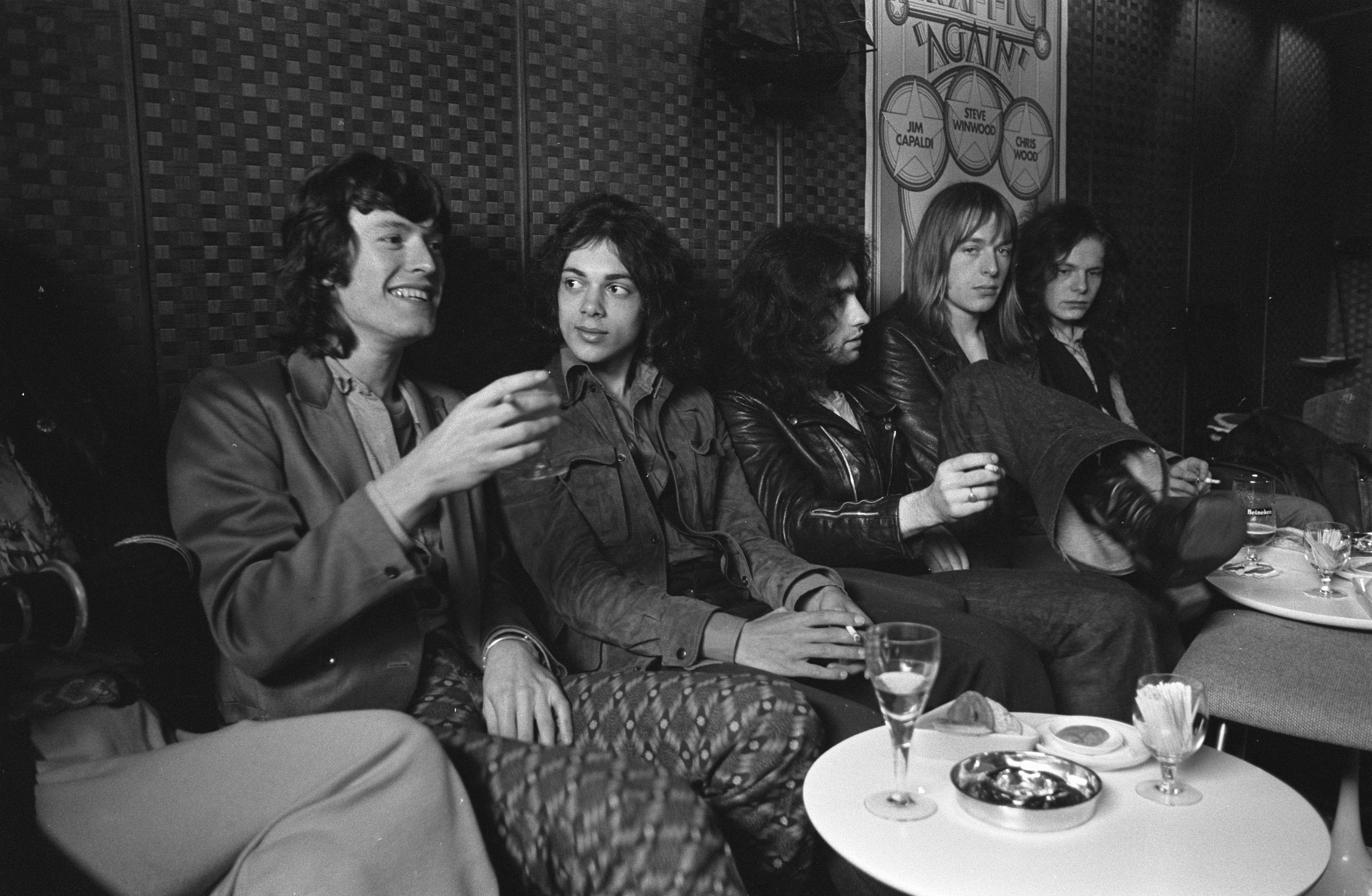
- Free in Amsterdam with Steve Winwood, July 1970. Left to right: Winwood, Andy Fraser, Paul Rodgers, Simon Kirke, Paul Kossoff.

Background information
- Origin: London, England
- Genres: Hard rock; blues rock; rock
- Works: Free discography
- Years active: 1968–1971; 1972–1973
- Labels: Island; A&M; Polydor
- Spinoffs: Kossoff Kirke Tetsu Rabbit; Sharks; Bad Company; Back Street Crawler
- Spinoff of: Black Cat Bones
- Past members: Paul Rodgers; Paul Kossoff; Andy Fraser; Simon Kirke; John Bundrick; Tetsu Yamauchi; Wendell Richardson
- Website: freebandofficial.com

Free were an English rock band formed in London in 1968 by Paul Rodgers (vocals, guitar), Paul Kossoff (guitar), Andy Fraser (bass, keyboards) and Simon Kirke (drums). They are best known for their hit songs "All Right Now" and "Wishing Well". Although renowned for their live performances and non-stop touring, their music did not sell well until their third studio album, Fire and Water (1970), which featured the hit "All Right Now". The song helped secure them a performance at the 1970 Isle of Wight Festival, where they played to an audience of 600,000 people. In the early 1970s they became one of the best-selling British blues rock groups; by the time they disbanded, they had sold more than 20 million records worldwide and had played in more than 700 arenas and festival concerts. "All Right Now" remains a staple of R&B and rock, and has entered ASCAP's "One Million" airplay singles club.

Fraser left the band in 1972 and formed Sharks. Free recorded one more album, Heartbreaker, before disbanding in 1973; Rodgers and Kirke went on to co-form the more successful rock supergroup Bad Company. Kossoff formed Back Street Crawler in 1973, but died from a pulmonary embolism at the age of 25 in 1976. Fraser died in 2015 at 62.

Rolling Stone has referred to the band as "British hard rock pioneers". The magazine ranked Rodgers No. 55 on its list of the "100 Greatest Singers of All Time", and Kossoff at No. 51 on its list of the "100 Greatest Guitarists of All Time". Free were signed to Island Records in the UK and A&M Records in North America.

== History ==
=== Formation, early years and breakthrough ===
Paul Kossoff and Simon Kirke became friends while in the R&B band Black Cat Bones, but they wanted to move on. When Kossoff saw Paul Rodgers singing with his band 'Brown Sugar' at the Fickle Pickle, an R&B club in London's Finsbury Park, he was immediately impressed and asked to jam onstage with Rodgers. Along with Kirke, they began the search for a fourth member. Alexis Korner recommended Andy Fraser, who had been playing with John Mayall & the Bluesbreakers. Korner also provided the name "Free" to the new band.

The group played their first gig on 19 April 1968 at the Nag's Head pub, at the junction of York Road and Plough Road in Battersea, London. They were all teenagers – bass player Fraser was 15 years old, lead guitarist Kossoff was 17, and lead singer Rodgers and drummer Kirke were 18. By November they had recorded their first album, Tons of Sobs, for Island Records, released in March 1969. The album documented their first six months together and contains studio renditions of much of their early live set. To promote the forthcoming album they opened some shows at the end of 1968 for The Who, who played a short theatre tour with Arthur Brown.

The group's second studio album, Free, was recorded and released in 1969 on Island Records. While their first two albums were not greatly successful, their third album Fire and Water, released in 1970, was a huge success, largely due to its hit single "All Right Now", which reached No. 2 on the UK singles chart and No. 4 on the US Billboard Hot 100. "All Right Now" was written by Fraser in the dressing room immediately after a bad performance by the band. The album reached No. 2 in the UK charts and No. 17 on the U.S charts, making it the most successful Free album. "All Right Now" became a No. 1 hit in over 20 territories and was recognised by ASCAP in 1990 for garnering 1 million plus radio plays in the US by late 1989. In 2000 an award was given to Paul Rodgers by the British Music Industry when "All Right Now" passed 2 million radio plays in the UK.

Despite its name, Free was the only advertised band who would not perform for free for the ailing Phun City festival in July 1970. Promoter Mick Farren said that when they learned there would be no payment, they left "without even getting out of the car." Kirke's replacement in Black Cat's Bones, Phil Lenoir, played the festival as drummer for Shagrat.

Highway was their fourth studio album, recorded extremely quickly in September 1970. It performed poorly in the charts, reaching No. 41 in the UK and No. 190 in the US.

In April 1971 they released the single "My Brother Jake", which reached number four in the UK Singles Chart and remained in the chart for 11 weeks. It was described by Dave Thompson of AllMusic as a "gorgeous knockabout" of a song. Record World said it was "their best since 'Alright Now'." The band performed the song on BBC's Top of the Pops on 13 May 1971.

=== First break-up, reformation, and final break-up ===
The band disbanded in 1971 because of differences between Fraser and Rodgers, who felt he was not being listened to. This led to the release of the live album called Free Live! In early 1972 the band set aside their differences and reformed in an effort to save Kossoff from his growing drug addiction, and released Free at Last in June of the same year.

Fraser left the band in mid-1972, frustrated by Kossoff's unreliability at being able to perform at shows or even at showing up. The remaining members recruited Japanese bass player Tetsu Yamauchi and keyboardist John "Rabbit" Bundrick (who had worked with Kossoff and Kirke during Free's initial split, recording Kossoff, Kirke, Tetsu and Rabbit) and in 1973 released what would be Free's final album, Heartbreaker. Kossoff was replaced by ex-Osibisa guitarist Wendell Richardson for a US tour in 1973, but shortly thereafter Free disbanded for good. Rodgers and Kirke went on to form Bad Company, Fraser formed Sharks and later the Andy Fraser Band, and Kossoff formed Back Street Crawler.

=== After Free ===
With Kossoff in better health again in late 1975, he was delighted that ex-colleagues Rodgers and Kirke asked him to join them on stage for two nights. A British tour was set to begin on 25 April 1976 with Back Street Crawler headlining with Bad Company in support of Back Street Crawler's second album, but again Kossoff's drug addictions contributed to a drastic decline in the guitarist's health. On a flight from Los Angeles to New York City on 19 March 1976, Kossoff died from a pulmonary embolism at the age of 25.

After parting with Bad Company in 1982, Rodgers went on to explore the heavy blues stylings of Free again in his solo career during the 1980s and 1990s, and in the bands The Firm and The Law. Subsequently, he teamed up as vocalist with two of the three remaining members of Queen (Brian May, John Deacon and Roger Taylor). In September 2008, Queen + Paul Rodgers released their first studio album The Cosmos Rocks. Rodgers also performed Free and Bad Company songs while on tour with Queen, in addition to the traditional Queen songs and new cuts from their most recently released album.

Fraser would go on to write songs for Robert Palmer, Joe Cocker, Chaka Khan, and Rod Stewart, among others. He wrote the Robert Palmer hit "Every Kinda People". Fraser and Rodgers performed together again at Woodstock '94.

Rodgers and Kirke toured again with Bad Company from 2012 to 2016. Andy Fraser died on 16 March 2015. In 2017, Paul Rodgers embarked on a Free Spirit UK Tour in May 2017 to celebrate the music of Free by performing songs strictly from the Free catalogue. In 2019 Bad Company reformed to tour in support of the first leg on Lynyrd Skynyrd's Last Of The Street Survivors Tour.

== Personnel ==
Original members

- Paul Rodgers – lead vocals (1968–1971, 1972–1973), keyboards, piano (1972), lead guitar (1972), rhythm guitar (1972–1973)
- Paul Kossoff – lead guitar (1968–1971, 1972, 1972–1973; died 1976)
- Andy Fraser – bass, keyboards, piano, rhythm guitar (1968–1971, 1972; died 2015)
- Simon Kirke – drums, percussion (1968–1971, 1972–1973), backing vocals (1972–1973)

Later members

- John "Rabbit" Bundrick – keyboards, piano, organ, backing vocals (1972–1973)
- Tetsu Yamauchi – bass (1972–1973; died 2025)
- Wendell Richardson – lead guitar (touring) (1973)

== Discography ==
- Tons of Sobs (1969)
- Free (1969)
- Fire and Water (1970)
- Highway (1970)
- Free at Last (1972)
- Heartbreaker (1973)

== See also ==
- List of 1970s one-hit wonders in the United States
