= All Right Now =

1970 song by Free

Single by Free

from the album Fire and Water
- B-side: "Mouthful of Grass"
- Released: 15 May 1970 (UK)
- Recorded: January 1970
- Studio: Trident, London; Island, London
- Genre: Hard rock
- Length: 4:14 (single mix); 5:31 (album version)
- Label: Island
- Songwriters: Andy Fraser; Paul Rodgers
- Producer: Free

Free singles chronology
"Fire and Water" (1970)	"All Right Now" (1970)	"The Stealer" (1970)

Live video
- "All Right Now" on YouTube

"All Right Now" is a song by English rock band Free, released on their third studio album, Fire and Water (1970). It was released by Island Records, a record label founded by Chris Blackwell. Released as the album's second single, "All Right Now" peaked at number two on the UK Singles Chart and number four on the US Billboard Hot 100 singles chart. In July 1973, the song was re-released, peaking at number 15 on the UK chart. In 1991, a Bob Clearmountain remix of the song was released, reaching number eight on the UK chart.

"All Right Now" was recognised by American Society of Composers, Authors, and Publishers in 1990 for accumulating over 1,000,000 radio plays in the U.S. by late 1989. In 2006, the BMI London awards included a Million Air award for 3,000,000 air plays of the song in the USA. The song remains as a staple track of classic rock radio.

It was covered by artists such as Mike Oldfield, Witch Queen, Rod Stewart, Pepsi & Shirlie (All Right Now) and GNR. A version arranged by the Stanford Band is the de facto fight song of Stanford University athletic teams.

== Composition ==
According to drummer Simon Kirke, "All Right Now" was written by Free bassist Andy Fraser and singer Paul Rodgers in the Durham Students' Union building, Dunelm House. He said: "'All Right Now' was created after a bad gig in Durham. We finished our show and walked off the stage to the sound of our own footsteps. The applause had died before I had even left the drum riser. It was obvious that we needed a rocker to close our shows. All of a sudden the inspiration struck Fraser and he started bopping around singing 'All Right Now'. He sat down and wrote it right there in the dressing room. It couldn't have taken more than ten minutes." Fraser has agreed largely with this history.

== Reception ==
Billboard called it a "funky beer blues swinger" that's a "mover from start to finish." Record World said that the song "lays a hunk of heaviness on your head" and "will establish [Free] once and for all."

== Chart history ==
=== Weekly charts ===
Chart (1970–1971)	Peak position
Australia (Kent Music Report)	44
Italy (FIMI)	56
Austria (Ö3 Austria Top 40)	6
Canada RPM Top Singles	4
Denmark (Tracklisten)	1
Belgium (Ultratop 50 Flanders)	10
France (SNEP)	4
Germany (GfK)	5
Ireland (IRMA)	5
Netherlands (Dutch Top 40)	9
Netherlands (Single Top 100)	8
Norway (VG-lista)	9
Sweden (Radio Sweden)	1
Switzerland (Schweizer Hitparade)	4
UK Singles (Official Charts)	2
US Billboard Hot 100	4
US Cash Box Top 100	3

=== Year-end charts ===
Chart (1970)	Rank
Canada	42
UK	7
US Billboard Hot 100	27
US Cash Box Top 100	38

== Certifications ==
Region	Certification	Certified units/sales
United Kingdom (BPI)	Platinum	600,000^{‡}
^{‡} Sales+streaming figures based on certification alone.

== Personnel ==
- Paul Rodgers – vocals
- Paul Kossoff – guitar
- Andy Fraser – bass, piano
- Simon Kirke – drums

== See also ==
- Return of the Champions
- Super Live in Japan
- List of 1970s one-hit wonders in the United States
- Free discography
