= Power Up Tour =

2024–2026 concert tour by AC/DC

- World tour by AC/DC
- Promotional poster for the tour
- Location: Australia; Europe; North America; South America
- Associated album: Power Up
- Start date: 17 May 2024
- End date: 2 October 2026
- Legs: 6
- No. of shows: 89
- Supporting acts: The Pretty Reckless; Amyl and the Sniffers; The Casanovas; Large Mirage; Oscar the Wild; The Southern River Band; Headsend; Hielo Negro; Eruca Sativa; Foo Fighters
- Attendance: 603,050 (10 shows)
- Box office: $91.1 million (10 shows)

AC/DC concert chronology
- Rock or Bust World Tour (2015–2016); Power Up Tour (2024–2026)

The Power Up Tour (stylised as PWR/UP Tour) was a concert tour by the Australian rock band AC/DC, in support of their seventeenth studio album Power Up (2020). The tour began on 17 May 2024 in Gelsenkirchen, Germany, and concluded on 2 October 2026 in East Rutherford, New Jersey. The Pretty Reckless served as the supporting act, aside from the Australian leg where opening act were Amyl and the Sniffers. The tour has grossed $69.3 million and sold 463,218 tickets from seven reported shows at venues in Germany, Austria, Switzerland, France and Ireland in 2024.

== Background ==
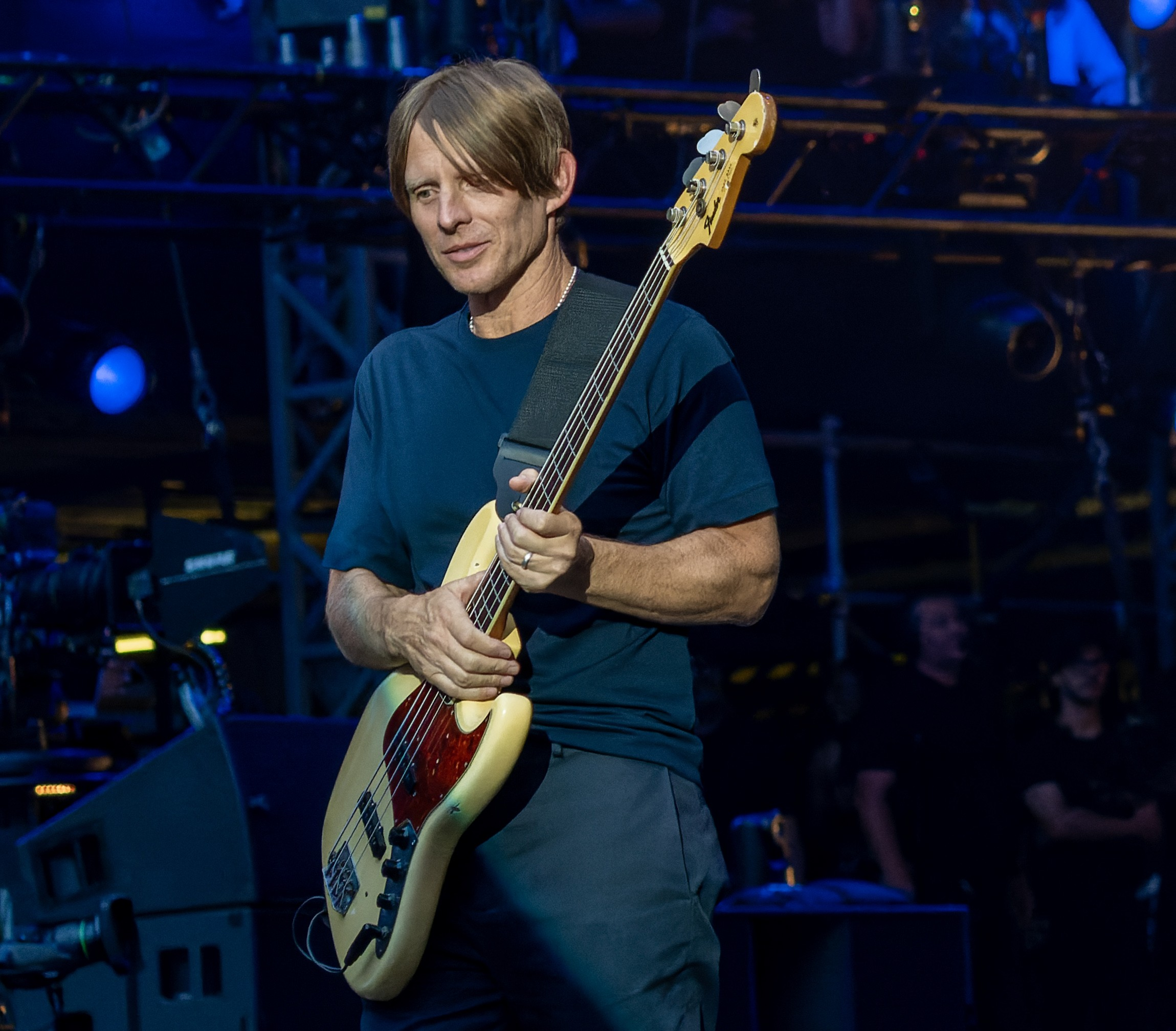
Chris Chaney (pictured in 2022) replaced Williams on bass guitar for the Power Up Tour

AC/DC embarked on the Rock or Bust World Tour in May 2015, in support of their sixteenth studio album, Rock or Bust (2014). On 7 March 2016, the members announced that the final ten dates of the tour would be rescheduled as Brian Johnson's doctors had ordered him to stop touring immediately, as he risked complete deafness if he persisted. He was replaced by Guns N' Roses front man Axl Rose on 16 April. Bassist Cliff Williams indicated that he would be leaving AC/DC after the tour during an interview with Gulfshore Life's Jonathan Foerste on 8 July 2016. After completing the tour, AC/DC went on hiatus. In August 2018, speculation grew that former members Johnson and Rudd were back and working with the band again. A fan living near the Warehouse Studio, Vancouver claimed to have observed them in the outdoor area of the studio from an apartment window. A photograph of Johnson with Williams at the gymnasium of the Living Shangri-La hotel in Vancouver in December 2018 also surfaced, further indicating that Williams had also rejoined the band.

On 7 October 2020, the band confirmed the upcoming release on 13 November of their next studio album, Power Up and issued its first single, "Shot in the Dark". The album's track listing was revealed on their website the same day. AC/DC performed a co-headlining act of the Power Trip music festival, at the Empire Polo Club in Indio, California on 7 October 2023, with Williams being part of the line-up after coming out of retirement, and American drummer Matt Laug, replacing Rudd. The band have dropped clues, giving "speculation" that they would be going on another tour in 2024; including an appearance in the Olympiastadion in Munich on 12 June 2024.

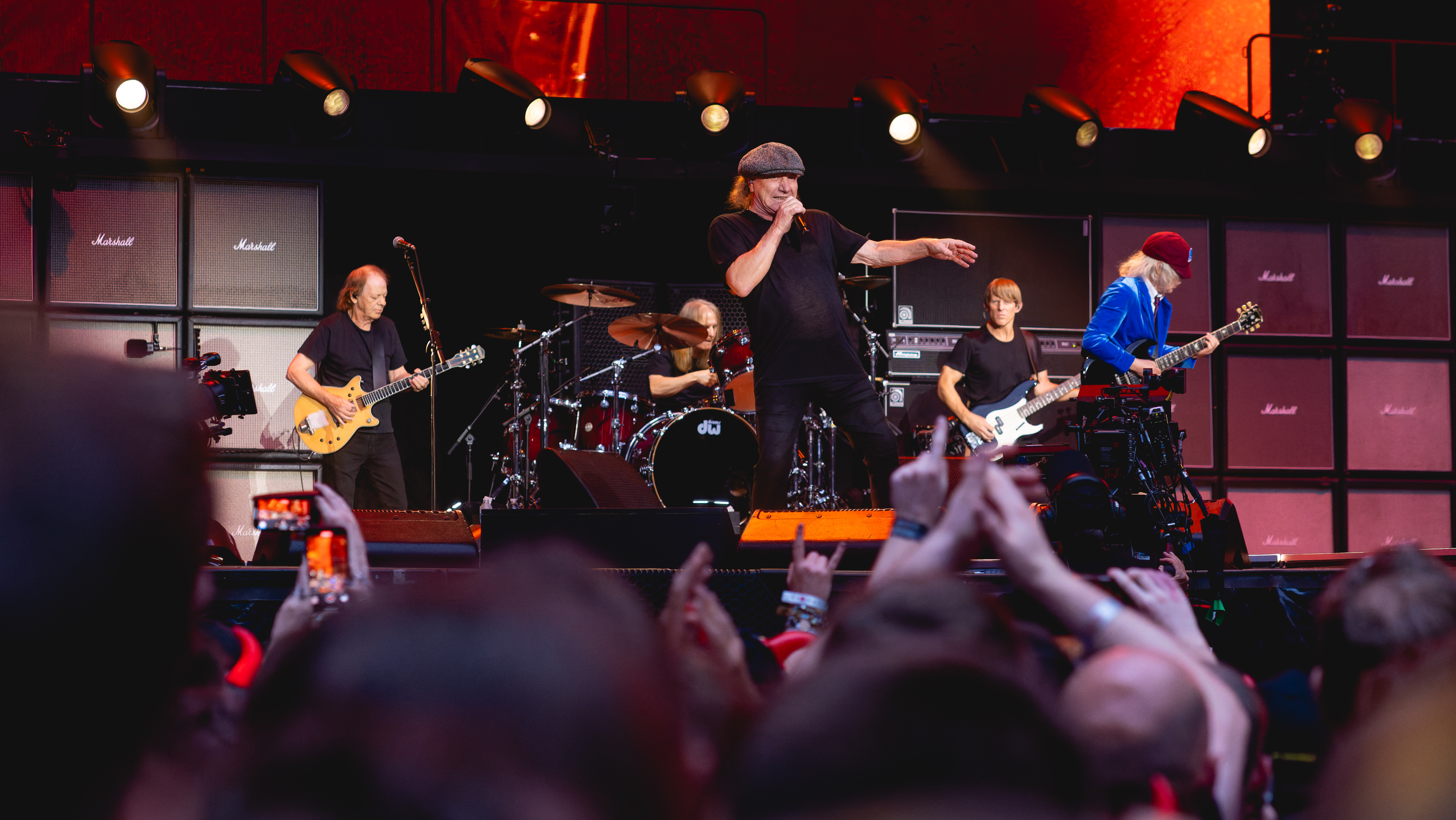
AC/DC performing in London in 2024

On 6 February 2024, the band published a teaser on their social accounts, showing the band's lightning bolt symbol flickering, before the words "Are You Ready" appear and their song of the same name. The tour was announced on 12 February, with former Jane's Addiction member Chris Chaney replacing Williams as bassist. On 16 February, additional shows were later announced for Seville, Dresden and Hanover. American band The Pretty Reckless were set to support the band for the first European leg. The band launched five dive bars in Gelsenkirchen, Seville, Munich, London and Paris during the tour, named the High Voltage Dive Bar. A photo of the touring lineup rehearsing for the tour was released on 12 May 2024, a few days before the tour began. The European leg of the tour concluded in Dublin on 17 August 2024.

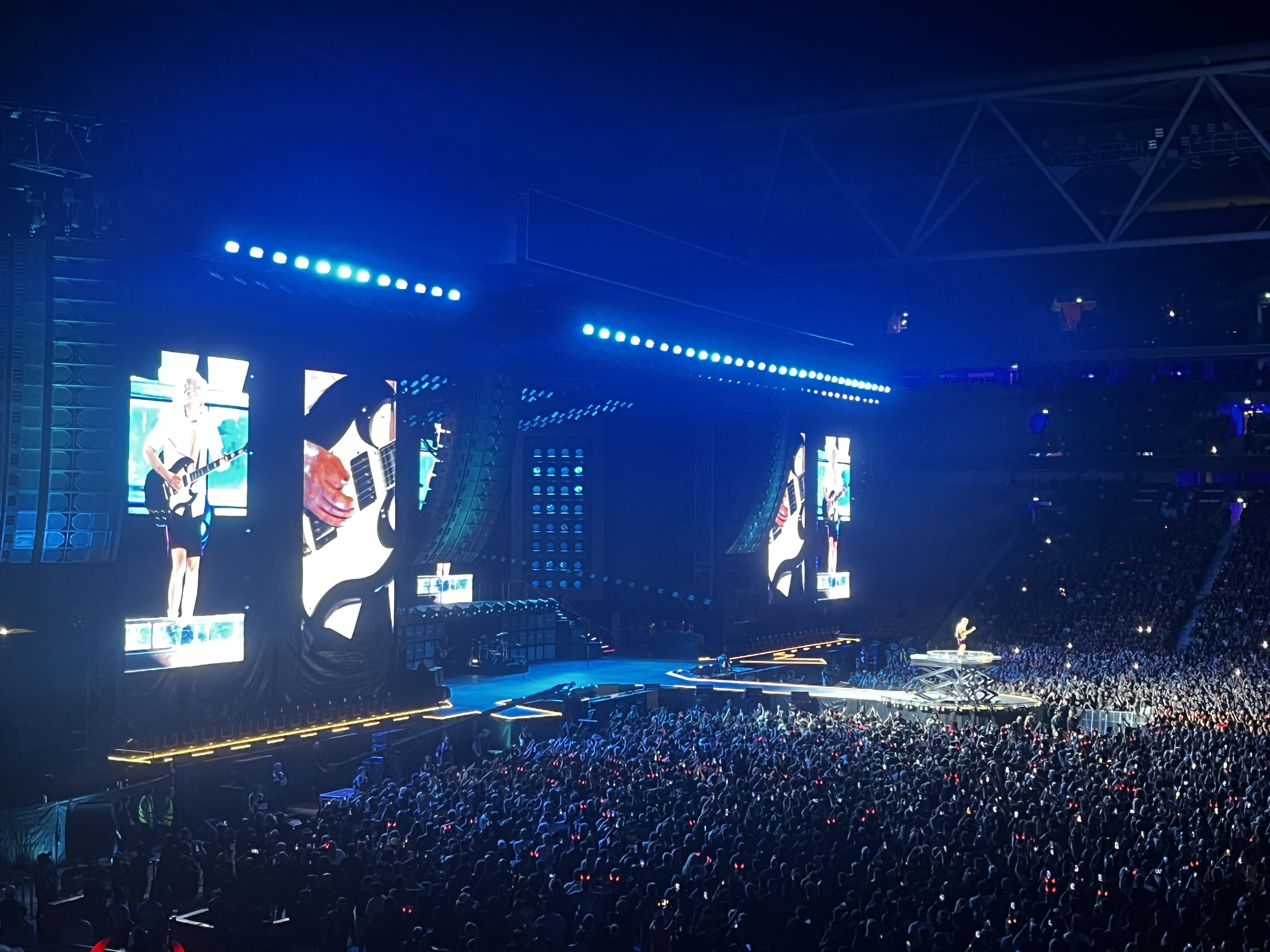
Angus Young performing on a raised platform as a part of the Power Up Tour, Brisbane, 14 December 2025

Following rumours about the announcement of a North American tour, the band announced shows in the United States and Canada on 2 December 2024, consisting of thirteen shows to take place from April to May 2025, with The Pretty Reckless as the opening act. A second European leg was announced on 3 February 2025, consisting of twelve shows to take place from June to August 2025. An additional two shows were later added in Madrid and Gothenburg on 7 February, and a second Paris show on 11 February. On 9 May 2025, the Düsseldorf show had changed its venue due to delays. The Nashville show on 20 May was also postponed to the next day due to a tornado watch issued for all counties in Middle Tennessee including Nashville by the National Weather Service Nashville. On 20 June 2025, a hint of an Australian tour has been circulating, because the band's signature lightning bolt was projected at the Nylex Clock in Melbourne. On 23 June, the band announced the Australian shows, with Amyl and the Sniffers as the opening act.

== Ticketing ==
General admission ticket for the show in Dresden on 16 June 2024

Alongside the announcement of the tour, it was revealed that a public on-sale for the tour did not happen. Fans could register for a chance to buy tickets through the presale on 16 February 2024 between 9–11 am local times through all dates, except on the second night in Seville, on 20 February at 9:45 am.

A majority of the European dates were marked as "sold out", including in Reggio Emilia, which sold out in "a few hours". In Dublin, fans experienced a technical issue with Ticketmaster, where almost 35,000 people were in the queue to buy tickets. Meanwhile, some fans were fuming about standing ticket prices being €335 or more, with one person posting on X, saying it is "daylight robbery". On 28 March 2024, Creative Artists Agency co-head Chris Dalston spoke with Pollstar and reported that the band had sold 1.5 million tickets in one day for the European tour dates.

== Set list ==
This set list was taken from the 25 May 2024 show in Reggio Emilia, Italy. It is not intended to represent all dates throughout the tour.

1. "If You Want Blood (You've Got It)"
2. "Back in Black"
3. "Demon Fire"
4. "Shot Down in Flames"
5. "Thunderstruck"
6. "Have a Drink on Me"
7. "Hells Bells"
8. "Shot in the Dark"
9. "Stiff Upper Lip"
10. "Shoot to Thrill"
11. "Sin City"
12. "Rock 'n' Roll Train"
13. "Dirty Deeds Done Dirt Cheap"
14. "High Voltage"
15. "Riff Raff"
16. "You Shook Me All Night Long"
17. "Highway to Hell"
18. "Whole Lotta Rosie"
19. "Let There Be Rock"
  Encore
20. "T.N.T."
21. "For Those About to Rock (We Salute You)"

=== Alterations ===
- At the two Gelsenkirchen shows, "Givin' the Dog a Bone", "Dog Eat Dog" and "Hell Ain't a Bad Place to Be" were added to the set list.
- During the show in Paris, "Hell Ain't a Bad Place to Be" replaced "Shot Down in Flames".
- During the show in Düsseldorf, "Hell Ain't a Bad Place to Be" replaced "Rock 'n' Roll Train".
- During the first show in Madrid and starting with the show in Imola, "Dog Eat Dog" replaces "Rock 'n' Roll Train".
- During the second show in Madrid, "Givin' the Dog a Bone" replaced "Rock 'n' Roll Train".
- During the first Melbourne show, "Jailbreak" was played for the first time since 1991, and started replacing "Rock 'n' Roll Train" in the set list.

=== Guests ===
- During the final show in East Rutherford, Dave Grohl performed "Highway to Hell", as a second rhythm guitarist and backing vocalist.

== Tour dates ==
List of 2024 concerts
Date (2024)	City	Country	Venue	Opening act	Attendance	Revenue
17 May	Gelsenkirchen	Germany	Veltins-Arena	The Pretty Reckless	—	—
21 May	Gelsenkirchen	Germany	Veltins-Arena	The Pretty Reckless	—	—
25 May	Reggio Emilia	Italy	RCF Arena	The Pretty Reckless	—	—
29 May	Seville	Spain	Estadio de La Cartuja	The Pretty Reckless	—	—
1 June	Seville	Spain	Estadio de La Cartuja	The Pretty Reckless	—	—
5 June	Amsterdam	Netherlands	Johan Cruyff Arena	The Pretty Reckless	—	—
9 June	Munich	Germany	Olympiastadion	The Pretty Reckless	—	—
12 June	Munich	Germany	Olympiastadion	The Pretty Reckless	—	—
16 June	Dresden	Germany	Ostragehege	The Pretty Reckless	131,431 / 150,234	$17,725,863
19 June	Dresden	Germany	Ostragehege	The Pretty Reckless	131,431 / 150,234	$17,725,863
23 June	Vienna	Austria	Ernst-Happel-Stadion	The Pretty Reckless	118,066 / 118,066	$17,469,813
26 June	Vienna	Austria	Ernst-Happel-Stadion	The Pretty Reckless	118,066 / 118,066	$17,469,813
29 June	Zürich	Switzerland	Letzigrund	The Pretty Reckless	48,875 / 48,875	$7,957,814
3 July	London	England	Wembley Stadium	The Pretty Reckless	—	—
7 July	London	England	Wembley Stadium	The Pretty Reckless	—	—
13 July	Hockenheim	Germany	Hockenheimring	The Pretty Reckless	—	—
17 July	Stuttgart	Germany	Cannstatter Wasen	The Pretty Reckless	—	—
21 July	Bratislava	Slovakia	Vajnory Airport	The Pretty Reckless	—	—
27 July	Nuremberg	Germany	Zeppelinfeld	The Pretty Reckless	—	—
31 July	Hanover	Germany	Messegelände	The Pretty Reckless	—	—
4 August	Hanover	Germany	Messegelände	The Pretty Reckless	—	—
9 August	Dessel	Belgium	Festivalpark Stenehei	The Pretty Reckless	—	—
13 August	Paris	France	Longchamp Racecourse	The Pretty Reckless	82,548 / 82,548	$11,824,575
17 August	Dublin	Ireland	Croke Park	The Pretty Reckless	82,298 / 82,298	$14,270,371

List of 2025 concerts
Date (2025)	City	Country	Venue	Opening act	Attendance	Revenue
10 April	Minneapolis	United States	U.S. Bank Stadium	The Pretty Reckless	46,176 / 46,176	$6,524,900
14 April	Arlington (Note: Labelled as Dallas in promotional material.)	United States	AT&T Stadium	The Pretty Reckless	—	—
18 April	Pasadena	United States	Rose Bowl	The Pretty Reckless	—	—
22 April	Vancouver	Canada	BC Place	The Pretty Reckless	—	—
26 April	Paradise (Note: Labelled as Las Vegas in promotional material.)	United States	Allegiant Stadium	The Pretty Reckless	—	—
30 April	Detroit	United States	Ford Field	The Pretty Reckless	—	—
4 May	Foxborough	United States	Gillette Stadium	The Pretty Reckless	—	—
8 May	Pittsburgh	United States	Acrisure Stadium	The Pretty Reckless	—	—
12 May	Landover	United States	Northwest Stadium	The Pretty Reckless	—	—
16 May	Tampa	United States	Raymond James Stadium	The Pretty Reckless	—	—
21 May (Note: The show on 21 May 2025 in Nashville was originally scheduled on 20 May, but was postponed due to a tornado watch being issued for Nashville by the National Weather Service Nashville.)	Nashville	United States	Nissan Stadium	The Pretty Reckless	—	—
24 May	Chicago	United States	Soldier Field	The Pretty Reckless	50,068 / 50,068	$8,600,000
28 May	Cleveland	United States	Huntington Bank Field	The Pretty Reckless	—	—
26 June	Prague	Czech Republic	Letňany Airport	The Pretty Reckless	—	—
30 June	Berlin	Germany	Olympiastadion	The Pretty Reckless	—	—
4 July	Warsaw	Poland	PGE Narodowy	The Pretty Reckless	—	—
8 July	Düsseldorf	Germany	Merkur Spiel-Arena (Note: Originally scheduled to take place at the Open Air Park.)	The Pretty Reckless	43,586 / 43,586	$6,685,002
12 July	Madrid	Spain	Riyadh Air Metropolitano	The Pretty Reckless	—	—
16 July	Madrid	Spain	Riyadh Air Metropolitano	The Pretty Reckless	—	—
20 July	Imola	Italy	Autodromo Internazionale Enzo e Dino Ferrari	The Pretty Reckless	—	—
24 July	Tallinn	Estonia	Song Festival Grounds	The Pretty Reckless	—	—
28 July	Gothenburg	Sweden	Ullevi	The Pretty Reckless	—	—
1 August	Gothenburg	Sweden	Ullevi	The Pretty Reckless	—	—
5 August	Oslo	Norway	Bjerke Travbane	The Pretty Reckless	—	—
9 August	Saint-Denis (Note: Labelled as Paris in promotional material.)	France	Stade de France	The Pretty Reckless	—	—
13 August	Saint-Denis	France	Stade de France	The Pretty Reckless	—	—
17 August	Karlsruhe	Germany	Messe Karlsruhe	The Pretty Reckless	—	—
21 August	Edinburgh	Scotland	Murrayfield Stadium	The Pretty Reckless	—	—
12 November	Melbourne	Australia	Melbourne Cricket Ground	Amyl and the Sniffers; The Casanovas	—	—
16 November	Melbourne	Australia	Melbourne Cricket Ground	Amyl and the Sniffers; The Casanovas	—	—
21 November	Sydney	Australia	Accor Stadium	Amyl and the Sniffers; Large Mirage	—	—
25 November	Sydney	Australia	Accor Stadium	Amyl and the Sniffers; Large Mirage	—	—
30 November (Note: This concert was part of the BP Adelaide Grand Final.)	Adelaide	Australia	Adelaide Street Circuit	Amyl and the Sniffers; Oscar the Wild	—	—
4 December	Perth	Australia	Optus Stadium	Amyl and the Sniffers; The Southern River Band	—	—
8 December	Perth	Australia	Optus Stadium	Amyl and the Sniffers; The Southern River Band	—	—
14 December	Brisbane	Australia	Suncorp Stadium	Amyl and the Sniffers; Headsend	—	—
18 December	Brisbane	Australia	Suncorp Stadium	Amyl and the Sniffers; Headsend	—	—

List of 2026 concerts
Date (2026)	City	Country	Venue	Opening act	Attendance	Revenue
24 February	São Paulo	Brazil	Estádio do Morumbi	The Pretty Reckless	—	—
28 February	São Paulo	Brazil	Estádio do Morumbi	The Pretty Reckless	—	—
4 March	São Paulo	Brazil	Estádio do Morumbi	The Pretty Reckless	—	—
11 March	Santiago	Chile	Parque Estadio Nacional	The Pretty Reckless; Hielo Negro	—	—
15 March	Santiago	Chile	Parque Estadio Nacional	The Pretty Reckless; Hielo Negro	—	—
23 March	Buenos Aires	Argentina	Estadio River Plate	The Pretty Reckless; Eruca Sativa	—	—
27 March	Buenos Aires	Argentina	Estadio River Plate	The Pretty Reckless; Eruca Sativa	—	—
31 March	Buenos Aires	Argentina	Estadio River Plate	The Pretty Reckless; Eruca Sativa	—	—
7 April	Mexico City	Mexico	Estadio GNP Seguros	The Pretty Reckless	—	—
11 April	Mexico City	Mexico	Estadio GNP Seguros	The Pretty Reckless	—	—
15 April	Mexico City	Mexico	Estadio GNP Seguros	The Pretty Reckless	—	—
11 July	Charlotte	United States	Bank of America Stadium	The Pretty Reckless	—	—
15 July	Columbus	United States	Ohio Stadium	The Pretty Reckless	—	—
19 July	Madison	United States	Camp Randall Stadium	The Pretty Reckless	—	—
24 July	San Antonio	United States	Alamodome	The Pretty Reckless	—	—
28 July	Denver	United States	Empower Field at Mile High	The Pretty Reckless	—	—
1 August	Paradise	United States	Allegiant Stadium	The Pretty Reckless	—	—
5 August	Santa Clara (Note: Labelled as San Francisco in promotional material.)	United States	Levi's Stadium	The Pretty Reckless	—	—
9 August	Edmonton	Canada	Commonwealth Stadium	The Pretty Reckless	—	—
13 August	Vancouver	Canada	BC Place	The Pretty Reckless	—	—
27 August	Atlanta	United States	Mercedes-Benz Stadium	The Pretty Reckless	—	—
31 August	Houston	United States	Reliant Stadium	The Pretty Reckless	—	—
4 September	South Bend (Note: Labelled as Notre Dame, Indiana in promotional material.)	United States	Notre Dame Stadium	The Pretty Reckless	—	—
8 September	St. Louis	United States	The Dome at America's Center	Foo Fighters	—	—
12 September	Montreal	Canada	Parc Jean-Drapeau	The Pretty Reckless	—	—
20 September	Winnipeg	Canada	Princess Auto Stadium	The Pretty Reckless	—	—
29 September	Philadelphia	United States	Lincoln Financial Field	The Pretty Reckless	—	—
2 October (Note: The show on 2 October in East Rutherford was originally scheduled on 25 September, but was postponed due to a nor'easter storm issued for the New Jersey area.)	East Rutherford	United States	MetLife Stadium	Foo Fighters	—	—
Total					603,050 / 621,853 (96.98%)	$91,058,338

=== Cancelled dates ===
List of cancelled concerts
Date (2026)	City	Country	Venue	Reason	Ref.
16 September	Toronto	Canada	Rogers Stadium	Venue damage caused by a severe thunderstorm	

== Personnel ==
AC/DC

- Brian Johnson – lead vocals
- Angus Young – lead guitar, backing vocals
- Stevie Young – rhythm guitar, backing vocals

Touring musicians

- Chris Chaney – bass guitar, backing vocals
- Matt Laug – drums
