= Shot in the Dark (AC/DC song) =

2020 single by AC/DC

Single by AC/DC

from the album Power Up
- Released: 7 October 2020
- Recorded: August – September 2018; Early 2019
- Genre: Hard rock; blues rock
- Length: 3:06
- Label: Columbia
- Songwriters: Angus Young; Malcolm Young
- Producer: Brendan O'Brien

AC/DC singles chronology
"Rock the Blues Away" (2015)	"Shot in the Dark" (2020)	"Realize" (2020)

Music video
- "Shot in the Dark" on YouTube

"Shot in the Dark" is a single by Australian rock band AC/DC from their seventeenth studio album Power Up. The song was recorded late 2018 to early 2019. It was released on 7 October 2020, and is the band's first single released since 2015's "Rock the Blues Away" from their album Rock or Bust. The song was used as the official theme for WWE Survivor Series and is part of the MLB The Show 21 soundtrack.

The song was nominated for two Grammys for the 64th Grammy Awards, Best Rock Performance and Best Music Video.

At the APRA Music Awards of 2022, the song was nominated for Most Performed Rock Work. It ultimately won that award.

On 7 October 2023 the band played the song live for the first time at the Power Trip festival, the bands first show since 2016. They are currently playing the song on their Power Up Tour.

== Music video ==
The music video, directed by David Mallet, premiered on AC/DC's YouTube channel on 26 October 2020.

== Release ==
On 1 October 2020, the band teased the new single in a 30-second video posted on Twitter, appearing to power up the amp with its iconic lightning bolt logo while playing the song, and noting PWR/UP, short for Power Up. AC/DC went on hiatus after completing their Rock or Bust tour in 2016, which featured Guns N' Roses singer, Axl Rose. In 2018, members Brian Johnson, Phil Rudd, and Cliff Williams rejoined the band after the two-year hiatus. On 5 October 2020, the band shared another short clip composed of behind-the-scenes footage featuring brief appearances by all five members of the band.

== Personnel ==
AC/DC

- Angus Young – lead guitar, backing vocals
- Brian Johnson – lead vocals
- Cliff Williams – bass guitar, backing vocals
- Phil Rudd – drums
- Stevie Young – rhythm guitar, backing vocals

Additional personnel

- Brendan O'Brien – production
- Mike Fraser – engineering, mixing
- Ryan Smith – mastering
- Billy Bowers – additional engineering

== Charts ==
=== Weekly charts ===
Weekly chart performance for "Shot in the Dark"
Chart (2020)	Peak position
Australia Digital Tracks (ARIA)	3
Austria (Ö3 Austria Top 40)	67
Belgium (Ultratip Bubbling Under Flanders)	21
Belgium (Ultratip Bubbling Under Wallonia)	31
Canada Hot 100 (Billboard)	50
Canada Rock (Billboard)	2
Finland (Suomen virallinen lista)	43
El Salvador (Monitor Latino)	12
Euro Digital Song Sales (Billboard)	6
Germany (GfK)	79
Global 200 (Billboard)	150
New Zealand Hot Singles (RMNZ)	5
Scottish Singles Sales (Official Charts)	13
Switzerland (Schweizer Hitparade)	19
UK Singles Sales (OCC)	30
UK Singles Downloads (OCC)	25
UK Rock & Metal (Official Charts)	10
US Bubbling Under Hot 100 (Billboard)	16
US Digital Song Sales (Billboard)	5
US Hot Rock & Alternative Songs (Billboard)	12
US Rock & Alternative Airplay (Billboard)	3

=== Year-end charts ===
Year-end chart performance for "Shot in the Dark"
Chart (2021)	Position
US Hot Hard Rock Songs (Billboard)	9
US Rock Airplay (Billboard)	24

== Certifications ==
Certifications for "Shot in the Dark"
Region	Certification	Certified units/sales
Canada (Music Canada)	Gold	40,000^{‡}
^{‡} Sales+streaming figures based on certification alone.
