= The Alchemist (Home album) =

Studio album by Home
- Released: 1973
- Recorded: Rockfield Studios, Trident Studios
- Genre: Progressive rock
- Label: CBS Records
- Producer: John Anthony

Home chronology
Home (1972)	The Alchemist (1973)

Professional ratings
Review scores
Source	Rating
Allmusic	4/5 stars

The Alchemist is the third and final album by British rock band Home, released in 1973 on the CBS Records label. After the group disbanded in 1974, Cliff Williams went on to join Bandit from 1975 to 1977 before he replaced Mark Evans in Australian hard rock band AC/DC. Guitarist Laurie Wisefield went on to achieve success with the British band Wishbone Ash from 1974 to 1985. The record also featured Jimmy Anderson on keyboards. Though the album was loved by the critics, it did not sell well commercially.

== Track listing ==
The story was written by Micky Stubbs and David Skillen. Lyrics by David Skillen. Music by Home.

1. "Schooldays" – 2:57
2. "The Old Man Dying" – 3:47
3. "Time Passes By" – 2:05
4. "The Old Man Calling (Save the People)" – 3:15
5. "The Disaster" – 2:36
6. "The Sun's Revenge" – 4:00
7. "A Secret to Keep" – 1:18
8. "The Brass Band Played" – 1:25
9. "Rejoicing" – 2:49
10. "The Disaster Returns (Devastation)" – 8:03
11. "The Death of the Alchemist" – 4:35
12. "The Alchemist" – 3:48

=== Esoteric remaster (2010) bonus tracks ===
1. "Green Eyed Fairy"
2. "Sister Rosalie"
3. "Hayward Town (previously unreleased)"

== Personnel ==
Home

- Mick Stubbs – lead vocals, guitars, piano
- Laurie Wisefield – lead, acoustic and steel guitars, vocals
- Jimmy Anderson – keyboards, synthesizer, vocals
- Cliff Williams – bass guitar, vocals
- Mick "Cookie" Cook – drums, various percussion

Technical

- John Anthony, Pat Moran, Mike Stone, Ted Sharp – engineer
