= No Good Woman =

Studio album by Geordie
- Released: 1978
- Recorded: 1977–78
- Genre: Glam rock; hard rock
- Length: 45:59
- Label: EMI
- Producer: Roberto Danova, Ellis Elias

Geordie chronology
Save the World (1976)	No Good Woman (1978)	No Sweat (1983)

No Good Woman is the fourth studio album by British glam rock band Geordie. It includes tracks that were recorded by the previous line-ups, as well as several new players. It is the band's last album with original lead vocalist Brian Johnson before he left to join AC/DC in 1980.

Professional ratings
Review scores
Source	Rating
Allmusic	3.5/5 stars

== Track listing ==
1. "No Good Woman" (Dave Ditchburn, Vic Malcolm) – 4:00
2. "Wonder Song" (Ditchburn, Malcolm) – 5:04
3. "Going to the City" (Derek Rootham, Brian Johnson, Dave Robson) – 3:27
4. "Rock 'n' Roll Fever" (Roberto Danova, Steve Voice, Peter Yellowstone) – 3:02
5. "Ain't It a Shame" (Ditchburn, Malcolm) – 3:47
6. "Give It All You Got" (Malcolm) – 4:47
7. "Show Business" (Malcolm) – 2:59
8. "You've Got It" (Malcolm) – 5:36
9. "Sweet Little Rock 'n' Roller" (Danova, Howdar*, Yellowstone) – 3:00
10. "Victoria" (Malcolm) – 3:28

* "Howdar" is a pseudonym for the songwriting partnership of David Howman and Gavin Dare.

== Personnel ==
- Brian Johnson – vocals (3, 4, 9, 11, 12)
- Dave Ditchburn – vocals
- Vic Malcolm – guitar, vocals
- Tom Hill – bass guitar
- Brian Gibson – drums
- Frank Gibbon – bass guitar
- Derek Rootham – guitar
- Dave Robson – bass guitar
- Davy Whittaker – drums
- George Defty – drums
- Alan Clark – keyboards
