= Save the World =

Save the World may refer to:

== Music ==
- Save the World (Geordie album), 1976
- Save the World (Yolanda Adams album), 1993
- "Save the World" (George Harrison song), 1981
- "Save the World" (Swedish House Mafia song), 2011
- "Save the World", a song by Adelitas Way from Stuck, 2014
- "Save the World", a song by Blaxy Girls, 2010
- "Save the World", a song by Bon Jovi from Crush, 2000
- "Save the World", a track from the soundtrack of the 2015 video game Undertale by Toby Fox
- "10AM/Save the World", a song by Metro Boomin from Not All Heroes Wear Capes, 2018
- "Save the World", a song by Orson from Bright Idea, 2006
- Save the World Reunion Tour, a 2019 concert tour by Swedish House Mafia

== Video games ==
- Fortnite: Save the World, a video game
- Sam & Max Save the World, a 2006–07 episodic video game
