= No Sweat =

No Sweat may refer to:

- No Sweat (organisation), a not-for-profit organisation which fights for the well-being and protection of sweatshop labourers
- No Sweat (TV series), a British television children's comedy show
- No Sweat (Blood, Sweat & Tears album), 1973
- No Sweat (Geordie album), 1983
- No Sweat (band), an Irish rock band
