= Mick Rock =

British photographer (1948–2021)

- Born: Michael Edward Chester Smith; 21 November 1948; Hammersmith, London, England
- Died: 18 November 2021 (aged 72); Staten Island, New York City, U.S.
- Other name: Michael David Rock
- Occupation: Photographer
- Spouse: Pati Rock
- Children: 1
- Website: mickrock.com

Michael David Rock (born Michael Edward Chester Smith; 21 November 1948 – 18 November 2021) was a British photographer. He photographed rock music acts such as Queen, David Bowie, Waylon Jennings, T. Rex, Syd Barrett, Lou Reed, Iggy Pop and the Stooges, the Sex Pistols, Ozzy Osbourne, the Ramones, Joan Jett, Talking Heads, Roxy Music, Thin Lizzy, Geordie, Mötley Crüe, Blondie and Third Eye Blind. Often referred to as "The Man Who Shot the Seventies", he shot most of the memorable photos of Bowie as Ziggy Stardust in his capacity as Bowie's official photographer. Rock's work is held in the collection of the National Portrait Gallery, London.

== Early life ==
According to most sources, Michael David Rock was born on 21 November 1948 in Hammersmith, London, the son of David and Joan Rock, although in a 2017 interview he stated that his birth name was Michael Edward Chester Smith, and his birth was the result of his mother's relationship with an American airman.

He was educated at Emanuel School in London, and Gonville and Caius College, Cambridge, graduating with a degree in Medieval and Modern Languages. While at Cambridge, he developed an interest in 19th century Romantic poetry—principally the works of Rimbaud, Baudelaire, Shelley, and Byron—and his first appearance in the press came after he was arrested for marijuana possession.

== Career ==
During his time at Cambridge, Rock rowed in the Caius First VIII, and also picked up a friend's camera and started to take pictures of the local rock music scene, acquiring some friends and contacts along the way (including Cambridge native Syd Barrett and Mick Jagger's younger brother Chris).

In addition to his work with Bowie, whom he met in early 1972, Rock also created album covers for Barrett's The Madcap Laughs, Waylon Jennings's Lonesome, On'ry and Mean, Lou Reed's Transformer and Coney Island Baby, Iggy Pop and the Stooges' Raw Power, Queen's Queen II (recreated for their music video "Bohemian Rhapsody") and Sheer Heart Attack, Geordie's Don't Be Fooled by the Name, the Ramones' End of the Century, and Joan Jett's I Love Rock 'n' Roll.

He was the chief photographer on the films The Rocky Horror Picture Show, Hedwig and the Angry Inch, and Shortbus. He also produced and directed the music videos "John, I'm Only Dancing", "Jean Genie", "Space Oddity", and "Life on Mars" on Bowie's Sound and Vision DVD collection.

His photo subjects include The Misfits, Snoop Dogg, Air Traffic, Maxwell, Alicia Keys, The Gossip, Lady Gaga, Richard Barone, The Killers, The Scissor Sisters, Michael Bublé, Miley Cyrus, Michael Stipe, Kate Moss, The Yeah Yeah Yeahs, The Chemical Brothers, Janelle Monáe, Queens of the Stone Age, Daft Punk, Kasabian, Snow Patrol, Daniel Merriweather, Black Keys, Hall & Oates, Peter, Bjorn and John, MGMT, Alejandro Escovedo, Pete Yorn, Gavin Degraw, Peaches, Fat Joe, Rhymefest, Nas, Q-Tip, Jane's Addiction, Tom Stoppard, the Foo Fighters, Bradford Cox and old friends Bowie, Lou Reed, Debbie Harry, Joan Jett, Mötley Crüe, Nicos Gun, and Iggy Pop.

Rock received the Diesel U Music Legends Award for his contribution to Music in late 2006.

== Exhibitions ==
- Rock'n Roll Eye: the photography of Mick Rock, Tokyo Photographic Art Museum, 2003. A retrospective.
- Rock 'n' Roll Icons: the photography of Mick Rock, Urbis Cultural Centre, Manchester, UK, 2005/6.

== Television ==
Rock was the host of On the Record with Mick Rock, a documentary series on the Ovation channel. The series followed Rock as he rolled across the country and met with musicians for a tour of their hometowns, highlighting the people, places, and cultural institutions that have been integral in their lives and careers. Each episode features a performance. Guests in the first season included Josh Groban, The Flaming Lips (featuring Wayne Coyne and Steven Drozd), Kings of Leon, Patti LaBelle, and Mark Ronson.

== Film ==
Shot! The Psycho-Spiritual Mantra of Rock (2016) is a biographical documentary about Rock, directed by Barnaby Clay, produced by Monica Hampton.

== Personal life ==
Rock moved to New York in the mid-1970s and lived in New York City on Staten Island with his wife, Pati Rock and their daughter.

He died on 18 November 2021, at the age of 72.

== Album cover photography ==
The following album covers feature Rock's photography:

- The Madcap Laughs – Syd Barrett (1970)
- Deuce – Rory Gallagher (1971)
- Live! In Europe - Rory Gallagher (1972)
- Transformer – Lou Reed (1972)
- Lonesome, On'ry and Mean – Waylon Jennings (1973)
- Raw Power – The Stooges (1973)
- Foreigner – Cat Stevens (1973)
- Pin Ups – David Bowie (1973)
- Queen II – Queen (1974)
- The Psychomodo – Cockney Rebel (1974)
- Don't Be Fooled by the Name – Geordie (1974)
- Sheer Heart Attack – Queen (1974)
- Coney Island Baby – Lou Reed (1975)
- Silly Sisters – Maddy Prior and June Tabor (1976)
- Rock and Roll Heart – Lou Reed (1976)
- Timeless Flight – Steve Harley & Cockney Rebel (1976)
- DMZ – DMZ (1978)
- We Have Come for Your Children – Dead Boys (1978)
- The Candidate – Steve Harley (1979)
- End of the Century – Ramones (1980)
- Come Upstairs – Carly Simon (1980)
- I Love Rock 'n Roll – Joan Jett & The Blackhearts (1981)
- The Blue Mask – Lou Reed (1982)
- Teaser – Angela Bofill (1983)
- Nightlife - Cobra Verde (1999)
- Out of the Vein – Third Eye Blind (2003)
- The Quality of Mercy – Steve Harley & Cockney Rebel (2005)
- Parallax – Atlas Sound (2011)
- Cool Blue Halo: 25th Anniversary Concert – Richard Barone (2012)
- Underneath the Rainbow – Black Lips (2014)
- Plastic Hearts – Miley Cyrus (2020)
- Every Loser – Iggy Pop (2023; posthumous)

== Publications ==
- A Photographic Record 1969–1980 (Century 22, 1995)
- Glam: An Eyewitness Account (foreword by Bowie) (Omnibus, 2006)
- Psychedelic Renegades / Syd Barrett (Genesis, 2002)
- Moonage Daydream / Ziggy Stardust (with Bowie) (Genesis). ISBN 978-1-84403-380-5.
- Rock 'n' Roll Eye (Tokyo Metropolitan Museum of Photography, 2003)
- Killer Queen (with Brian May and Roger Taylor) (Genesis, 2003)
- Picture This / Debbie Harry & Blondie (foreword by Debbie Harry) (Omnibus, 2004)
- Raw Power / Iggy & The Stooges (foreword by Iggy Pop) (Omnibus, 2005)
- Blood and Glitter. 2005. ISBN 978-0-9537479-9-3.
- Rocky Horror (foreword by Richard O'Brien) (Schwarzkopf & Schwarzkopf, 2006
- Classic Queen (Sterling, 2007). ISBN 978-1-4027-5192-9.
- Tamashii: Mick Rock Meets Kanzaburo (Kabuki Theatre Photos) (Hachette Fujingaho, Japan, 2007)
- Psychedelic Renegades (Gingko, 2007)
- Mick Rock Exposed (Chronicle, 2010).

== DVDs ==
- Punk Drunk Love: The Images of Mick Rock (Panoramica, 2007)

== Collections ==
Rock's work is held in the following permanent collection:

- National Portrait Gallery, London: 2 prints (as of 15 May 2023)
