= Home (British band) =

British progressive rock band

- Origin: England
- Genre: Progressive rock
- Years active: 1971–1974
- Labels: CBS Records; Major League Productions (MLP)
- Past members: Mick Cook; Mick Stubbs; Cliff Williams; Laurie Wisefield; Clive Johns; Jimmy Anderson

Home were a British progressive rock band, active in the early 1970s.

The core line up featured Mick Stubbs on lead guitar and lead vocals, Laurie Wisefield on lead guitar and vocals, Cliff Williams on bass guitar and vocals, and Mick Cook on drums. They also had two keyboardists during their existence. From 1971 to 1972 it was Swansea's Clive John (from the Welsh band Man), and the other for the rest of their short career was Jimmy Anderson.

== History ==
Home were formed by Cliff Williams and Laurie Wisefield in 1970 after their first group together, 'Sugar', split. They teamed up with guitarist and vocalist Mick Stubbs and drummer Mick Cook. They signed to CBS Records in 1971 and released their first album, Pause for a Hoarse Horse, in August. They started touring in November when they supported Led Zeppelin at the second Electric Magic Show at the Wembley Empire Pool. From then on, they opened for groups such as Argent, The Jeff Beck Group and The Faces. In September of the same year they went into the studio again to record the Home album. The LP reached number 41 in the UK Albums Chart.

Home went on to support Mott the Hoople's UK tour at London's Rainbow Theatre on 14 & 15 October 1972. The NME wrote in their review of the show on 15 October that "Those who went to see Mott the Hoople that night came back talking about Home instead." In January 1973 the NME named them the fifth 'most promising new name' in their readers poll. In March, the group did two shows opening for glam rock band Slade at the Empire pool Wembley. Then in July they released the concept album The Alchemist, which the band said was inspired by the novel Dawn of Magic by Louis Pauwels. It was hailed by the Disc magazine as 'a work of genius' but did not make an impact commercially. After Stubbs left the band, they toured the United States as a backing band for Al Stewart from May to June in 1974. A fourth Home album was recorded, but never released. After that the group split.

== Afterwards ==
After the 1974 split, Cliff Williams went to join Bandit from 1975 to 1977. After he left them, he was asked to replace AC/DC bassist Mark Evans and remained with the band until the present day (except for a two-year gap from 2016 to 2018). Laurie Wisefield joined Wishbone Ash and stayed with them until the mid-1980s. Mick Cook joined the new lineup of The Groundhogs in late 1975, where he replaced Clive Brooks on drums and in the 80s played with Lickmalolly. Mick Stubbs was a member of the short lived Paradise in 1975 and continued as a performer and writer (including the Lulu single "I Love to Boogie" 1979), and re-uniting with Cook for gigs.

== Discography ==
- 1971: Pause for a Hoarse Horse (CBS64365)
- 1972: Home (CBS 64752) - UK No. 41
- 1973: The Alchemist (CBS 65550)
- 2000: Home Live BBC Sessions 1972-1973 (Major League Productions, MLP02CD)
