= Don't Be Fooled by the Name =

Studio album by Geordie
- Released: 5 April 1974
- Recorded: 1974
- Studio: Lansdowne and Pye, London
- Genre: Glam rock; hard rock
- Length: 39:55
- Label: EMI Records
- Producer: Ellis Elias; Roberto Danova

Geordie chronology
| Hope You Like It (1973) | Don't Be Fooled by the Name (1974) | Save the World (1976) |

Don't Be Fooled by the Name is the second studio album by British glam rock band Geordie. Mick Rock was responsible for the cover art and photography.

Professional ratings
Review scores
| Source | Rating |
|---|---|
| AllMusic | 3/5 stars |

== Track listing ==
| No. | Title | Writer(s) | Length |
|---|---|---|---|
| 1. | "Goin' Down" | traditional, arranged by Brian Johnson and Vic Malcolm | 3:35 |
| 2. | "House of the Rising Sun" | traditional, arranged by Geordie | 5:00 |
| 3. | "So What" | Malcolm | 4:14 |
| 4. | "Mercenary Man" | Malcolm | 7:29 |
| 5. | "Ten Feet Tall" | Malcolm | 6:44 |
| 6. | "Got to Know" | Johnson, Malcolm | 3:25 |
| 7. | "Little Boy" | Malcolm | 4:43 |
| 8. | "Look at Me" | Malcolm | 5:01 |
| Total length: | | | 39:55 |

1990s Reissue Bonus Tracks (also on iTunes)
| No. | Title | Writer(s) | Length |
|---|---|---|---|
| 9. | "Treat Her Like a Lady" | Johnson, Dave Robson, Derek Rootham | 3:38 |
| 10. | "Rockin' With the Boys Tonight" | Johnson, Robsom, Rootham | 2:54 |
| 11. | "Francis Was a Rocker" | Malcolm | 2:56 |
| 12. | "Red Eyed Lady" | Malcolm | 3:05 |

2006 Japan 24-bit Remaster Bonus Tracks
| No. | Title | Length |
|---|---|---|
| 9. | "Electric Lady" |
| 10. | "Red Eyed Lady" |

2008 Remaster Bonus Tracks
| No. | Title | Length |
|---|---|---|
| 9. | "I Can't Forget You Now" (Brian Johnson solo single) | 3:35 |
| 10. | "I Can't Give You Up" (Brian Johnson solo single) | 2:56 |

The origin of "Mercenary Man" song has been superseded in reissued editions by single version of "Mercenary Man" (6:17).

== Personnel ==
Personnel taken from Don't Be Fooled by the Name liner notes.

Geordie

- Brian Johnson – vocals
- Vic Malcolm – guitar
- Tom Hill – bass guitar
- Brian Gibson – drums

Additional musician

- Haim Romano – guitar licks on "Got to Know"

Production

- Ellis Elias – production (all tracks)
- Roberto Danova — production (all except "Goin' Down" and "Got to Know")
- John Mackswith – engineering
- Ashley Howe – engineering
- Terry Enneritt – engineering
- Mick Rock – front cover concept, photography
