= Hope You Like It =

Studio album by Geordie
- Released: 2 March 1973
- Recorded: 1972–73
- Genre: Glam rock; hard rock
- Length: 40:32
- Label: EMI
- Producer: Ellis Elias, Roberto Danova

Geordie chronology
Hope You Like It (1973)	Don't Be Fooled by the Name (1974)

Hope You Like It is the debut studio album by the British glam rock band Geordie.

Professional ratings
Review scores
Source	Rating
AllMusic	4/5 stars

== Track listing ==
All songs written by Vic Malcolm, except where noted.

Side one
No.	Title	Length
1.	"Keep on Rockin'"	3:19
2.	"Give You Till Monday"	3:57
3.	"Hope You Like It"	3:39
4.	"Don't Do That"	3:11
5.	"All Because of You"	2:49
6.	"Old Time Rocker"	3.21

Side two
No.	Title	Writer(s)	Length
7.	"Oh Lord"		5:08
8.	"Natural Born Loser"		4:13
9.	"Strange Man"		3:30
10.	"Ain't It Just Like a Woman"		3:55
11.	"Geordie's Lost His Liggie"	traditional, arranged by Geordie	3:36
Total length:			40:32

1990s reissue bonus tracks (also on iTunes)
No.	Title	Writer(s)	Length
12.	"Can You Do It"		3:14
13.	"Electric Lady"		2:59
14.	"Geordie Stomp"	Vic Malcolm, Brian Johnson	2:44
15.	"Black Cat Woman"		3:19

2008 remaster bonus tracks
No.	Title	Writer(s)	Length
12.	"Francis Was a Rocker"		2:56
13.	"Can You Do It"		3:14
14.	"Red Eyed Lady"		3:07
15.	"Electric Lady"		2:59
16.	"Geordie Stomp"	Malcolm, Johnson	2:44
17.	"Black Cat Woman"		3:19

== Personnel ==
- Brian Johnson - vocals
- Vic Malcolm - guitar and vocals
- Tom Hill - bass
- Brian Gibson - drums
