= Masters of Rock =

Masters of Rock may refer to:

- Masters of Rock is a series of albums introduced of EMI (Bovema) of the Netherlands during 1973 of recordings from the EMI progressive/popular catalogue involving the re-issue of earlier compilations from the company's 'Best of' series (of 1970) and many new compilations . The Best of Pink Floyd thus appearing as Masters of Rock - Pink Floyd
- Masters of Rock (Hawkwind album) - 2002 compilation
- Masters of Rock, a 1975 album by Rare Earth
- Masters of Rock (Sammy Hagar album) - 2001 compilation
- Masters of Rock (festival), heavy metal festival in the Czech Republic
- Masters of Rock, a 2002 album by The Quireboys
- Masters of Rock (Geordie album), 1974 compilation album by rock band Geordie
