= Home (Home album) =

Studio album by Home
- Released: 1972
- Studio: Trident Studios, London; Advision Studios, London
- Genre: Progressive rock
- Label: CBS Records
- Producer: John Anthony

Home chronology
Pause for a Hoarse Horse (1971)	Home (1972)	The Alchemist (1973)

Professional ratings
Review scores
Source	Rating
Allmusic	3.5/5 stars

Home is the second album by UK rock band Home. It was released in 1972 by CBS Records.

== Track listing ==
All tracks composed by Mick Stubbs; except where indicated

1. "Dreamer" (Cliff Williams, Laurie Wisefield, Mick Cook, Mick Stubbs) – 5:30
2. "Knave" – 3:45
3. "Fancy Lady, Hollywood Child" (David Skillin, Mick Stubbs) – 4:05
4. "Rise Up" – 3:24
5. "Dear Lord" – 3:00
6. "Baby Friend of Mine" – 4:42
7. "Western Front" – 5:15
8. "Lady of the Birds" (Cliff Williams, Laurie Wisefield, Mick Cook, Mick Stubbs) – 9:13

== Personnel ==
Home

- Mick Stubbs – lead vocals, electric guitar, 12-string guitar, keyboards
- Laurie Wisefield – acoustic guitar, lead guitar, steel guitar, vocals
- Clive John – keyboards
- Cliff Williams – bass guitar, vocals
- Mick Cook – drums, percussion, vocals

Technical

- David Hentschel, Mike Stone – engineer
- Denis Waugh – front cover photography
