= Save the World (Geordie album) =

Studio album by Geordie
- Released: 13 August 1976
- Recorded: 1974–76
- Genre: Glam rock; hard rock
- Length: 38:00
- Label: EMI
- Producer: Roberto Danova, Ellis Elias, Pip Williams

Geordie chronology
Don't Be Fooled by the Name (1974)	Save the World (1976)	No Good Woman (1978)

Professional ratings
Review scores
Source	Rating
Allmusic	3/5 stars

Save the World is the third studio album by British hard rock band Geordie.

== Cover ==
The font used to spell "Save the World" on the album's front cover would in the late 1970s be utilized by British heavy metal band Iron Maiden for their now-famous logo.

== Track listing ==
All tracks 1976 Red Bus Records, except 2, 11 and 12, 1974 Red Bus Records, 3 and 9, 1975 Red Bus Records.

No.	Title	Writer(s)	Length
1.	"Mama's Gonna Take You Home" (Jericho a.k.a. Jericho Jones cover)	Robert Huxley, Samy Birnbach	2:53
2.	"She's a Teaser"	Vic Malcolm, Joe D'Ambrosia	3:15
3.	"Goodbye Love"	Brian Alterman, Mike Green	3:21
4.	"I Cried Today"	Brian Johnson, Micky Bennison	3:36
5.	"You Do This to Me"	Brian Gibson, Holness, Knight	3:07
6.	"Save the World" (Blackwater Junction cover)	John Goodison, Rod Alexander, John Collier, Simon Byrne	3:04
7.	"Rocking Horse"	Phillip "Pip" Williams	3:20
8.	"Fire Queen"	Malcolm	3:36
9.	"She's a Lady"	Tom Hill, Johnson, Gibson, Bennison	3:02
10.	"Light in My Window"	Johnson, Bennison	3:00
11.	"Ride on Baby"	Malcolm, Peter Yellowstone, Roberto Danova	2:37
12.	"We're All Right Now"	Johnson, Hill, Gibson, Malcolm	3:16
Total length:			38:00

== Personnel ==
- Brian Johnson - vocals
- Vic Malcolm - guitar
- Tom Hill - bass
- Brian Gibson - drums
- Micky Bennison - guitar
