= Pause for a Hoarse Horse =

Studio album by Home
- Released: 1971
- Genre: Progressive rock
- Label: CBS Records
- Producer: Mel Baister

Home chronology
Pause for a Hoarse Horse (1971)	Home (1972)

Professional ratings
Review scores
Source	Rating
AllMusic	3/5 stars

Pause for a Hoarse Horse is the debut studio album of British rock band Home. The record was released in 1971 by CBS Records. The band's line-up consisted of Cliff Williams on bass, Laurie Wisefield on guitar, Mick Cook on drums and Mick Stubbs on guitar. It also featured keyboardist Clive John. The album did not make much headway and was one of only three albums released by the group from 1971 to 1973.

== Track listing ==
- All songs written by Mick Stubbs, except where noted.
1. "Tramp" – 3:30
2. "Family" – 4:30
3. "Pause for a Hoarse Horse" – 3:00
4. "Red E. Lewis and the Red Caps" – 4:30
5. "In My Time" – 4:15 (Cliff Williams, Laurie Wisefield, Mick Cook, Mick Stubbs)
6. "How Would It Feel" – 3:25
7. "Bad Days" – 4:10
8. "Mother" – 4:05
9. "Moses" – 5:10
10. "Welwyn Garden City Blues" – 1:30 (Wisefield, Stubbs)
11. "You're No Good" – 3:00

== Personnel ==
- Mick Stubbs – lead guitar, 12-string guitar, lead vocals
- Laurie Wisefield – lead electric guitar, vocals
- Clive John – keyboards, Mellotron
- Cliff Williams – bass guitar, vocals
- Mick Cook – drums, percussion, vocals
- Johnny "Willie" Weider – violin

Technical

- Bill Shepherd – executive producer
- Mike O'Mahoney – front cover photography
