= Power Up (album) =

2020 studio album by AC/DC

Studio album by AC/DC
- Released: 13 November 2020
- Recorded: August – September 2018; 2019
- Studio: The Warehouse (Vancouver)
- Genres: Hard rock; rock and roll; blues rock
- Length: 41:03
- Label: Columbia
- Producer: Brendan O'Brien

AC/DC chronology
Rock or Bust (2014)	Power Up (2020)

Singles from Power Up
- 1. "Shot in the Dark" Released: 7 October 2020; 2. "Realize" Released: 11 November 2020; 3. "Demon Fire" Released: 9 December 2020; 4. "Witch's Spell" Released: 9 June 2021; 5. "Through the Mists of Time" Released: 30 September 2021

Power Up (stylised PWR/UP) is the seventeenth studio album by the Australian rock band AC/DC, released on 13 November 2020 through Columbia Records. Power Up marks the band's first album since the death of co-founder and rhythm guitarist Malcolm Young in 2017. Malcolm received posthumous songwriting credit (alongside his brother, Angus) for all of the album's songs, as they were co-written by him prior to his death. The album is dedicated and serves as tribute to Malcolm according to his brother.

Power Up was generally well received by music critics and reached number one in 21 countries. The album was nominated for the Best Rock Album on the 64th Annual Grammy Awards, but lost to Foo Fighters' Medicine at Midnight (2021). To support Power Up, the band undertook the Power Up Tour from May to August 2024, with drummer Matt Laug and bass guitarist Chris Chaney as touring members, replacing Rudd and Williams respectively.

== Background and recording ==
Following the 2014 album Rock or Bust, the group embarked on a seventeen-month world tour. Prior to the tour, drummer Phil Rudd was charged with attempting to procure murder, threatening to kill, and possession of methamphetamine and cannabis. For the tour, Rudd was replaced by Chris Slade, who had also previously played with AC/DC on their 1990 album The Razors Edge, several years after Rudd first left the band. By 2016, lead singer Brian Johnson had started to suffer hearing loss, causing the final ten dates of the Rock or Bust tour to be rescheduled. Ultimately, he was replaced with Guns N' Roses vocalist Axl Rose for the remaining dates. On 8 July 2016, bassist Cliff Williams announced that he would be retiring from the band once the tour was finished, citing health issues as reasons for retiring, and calling AC/DC a "changed animal".

This record is pretty much a dedication to Malcolm, my brother. It's a tribute for him like Back in Black was a tribute to Bon Scott.

— Angus Young, on Power Up

In 2018, rumours began circulating that AC/DC were working on their seventeenth studio album, with Johnson, Rudd, and Williams having returned to the group. Johnson, Rudd, Angus Young and Stevie Young were photographed in August 2018 at Warehouse Studio, a recording studio in Vancouver, British Columbia, Canada owned by fellow musician Bryan Adams, suggesting the band were working where they had recorded their three previous albums. The rumours were later confirmed as the truth, with the album having been recorded there over a six-week period in August and September 2018 with producer Brendan O'Brien, who also oversaw 2008's Black Ice and 2014's Rock or Bust, with some tweaking having followed in Los Angeles in 2019. Every track is credited to Angus and Malcolm Young as Angus had raided the AC/DC vault of unreleased songs to record the album. Critics described the album's sound as hard rock, rock and roll, and blues metal.

While promoting the album, Angus admitted that the songwriting process was difficult as he had to compile riffs that he had written with his brother Malcolm prior to his death in 2017. He stated that their nephew Stevie assisted him in arranging the riffs before the band entered the studio.

== Release and promotion ==
After a series of cryptic teases reading PWR/UP on the band's website, the album's title was revealed to be Power Up on 7 October 2020. The album was released on 13 November 2020. In its first week of release, it was projected to place either first or second on the Billboard 200 all-format albums chart, and to top the US and UK album sales chart.

Prior to the album release, the music audio for the band's first single, "Shot in the Dark", was released on 7 October 2020. A music video for the song was released on 26 October 2020. The song topped the Billboard Mainstream Rock Songs chart for two weeks starting in November 2020. A 53-second short clip of a second song, "Demon Fire", was debuted ahead of the album's release on 30 October 2020 as well; and was released once again on 8 December 2020. On 7 December 2020, it was announced that the music video for "Demon Fire" would have its world premiere release on 9 December 2020 as the third single from the album. Two days prior to the album release, the music audio for the album's second single, "Realize", was released on 11 November 2020. A music video for the song was also released via YouTube on 13 January 2021. A music video for the song "Witch's Spell" was published on YouTube on 9 June 2021. It was also released as a single the same day. On 12 June 2021, the song "Through the Mists of Time" was released as a twelve-inch single, with "Witch's Spell" as the B-side as a part of Record Store Day. A music video for the song was published on YouTube on 30 September 2021.

=== Tour ===
To further promote Power Up, AC/DC launched the Power Up Tour on 17 May 2024 on Gelsenkirchen, Germany, with former Jane's Addiction bassist Chris Chaney replacing Williams and former Slash's Snakepit drummer Matt Laug replacing Rudd. Two songs from the album, "Shot in the Dark" and "Demon Fire", were played.

== Critical reception ==
Professional ratings
Aggregate scores
Source	Rating
AnyDecentMusic?	7.2/10
Metacritic	79/100
Review scores
Source	Rating
AllMusic	4/5 stars
Clash	3.5/5 stars
Consequence of Sound	A−
Exclaim!	7/10
The Guardian	3/5 stars
The Independent	4/5 stars
Kerrang!	4/5 stars
NME	4/5 stars
Rolling Stone	3.5/5 stars
The Sydney Morning Herald	4/5 stars

At Metacritic, which assigns a normalised rating out of 100 to reviews from professional publications, the release received an average score of 79, based on 19 reviews, indicating "Generally favourable reviews". Aggregator AnyDecentMusic? gave the album a 7.2 out of 10, based on their assessment of the critical consensus.

AllMusic review by Stephen Thomas Erlewine stated, "Good times have always been a crucial part of the band, but there's a depth of feeling to the levity on Power Up, as if the band decided that the best way to pay respect to what they've lost is by focusing on what they still have. They don't dwell upon the past, they barrel forward with a set of turbocharged blues and high-octane rock that doesn't merely sound good, it feels nourishing." Daniel Sylvester of Exclaim! noted, "The fact that AC/DC came together to create something as satisfying as Power Up when the cards were down is a complete miracle upon itself, and AC/DC seem more than ready to celebrate." Kitty Empire of The Guardian gave the album three stars out of five, stating, "If deja vu is a familiar sensation with AC/DC, few outfits have managed to eke so much variety out of so few constituent parts as these stalwarts of reductio ad absurdum. For the undiminished certainties AC/DC provide in the face of adversity, it's hard not to salute them." Nick Ruskell of Kerrang! observed, "AC/DC have made an album that, even for them, is a high-voltage celebration of life, the best of times, and the absolutely indomitable, boundless power of a couple of chords and a four-four beat. In a time where getting together with your mates and partying and getting the beers in and shagging and living it up is all but illegal, as a reminder of just how powerful and timeless the very idea of these wonderful things are, AC/DC have never felt more necessary or vital."

=== Accolades ===
At the 2021 ARIA Music Awards, the album was nominated for Best Rock Album and the band were nominated for Best Group.

At the 2021 iHeartRadio Music Awards, the album won Rock Album of the Year. The single "Shot in the Dark" was nominated for Rock Song of the Year, but lost to Foo Fighters' "Shame Shame".

For the 64th Grammy Awards, the album was nominated for Best Rock Album, and "Shot in the Dark" was nominated for Best Rock Performance and Best Music Video.

The album won the 2020 Metal Storm award for Best Hard Rock Album. It was also nominated for Biggest Surprise, but lost to Lucid Planet's Lucid Planet II.

Accolades for Power Up
Publication	Accolade	Rank
Consequence of Sound	Top 50 Albums of 2020	44
Rolling Stone	Top 50 Albums of 2020	45

== Commercial performance ==
In Australia, Power Up debuted at number one on the ARIA Charts and, in the process, AC/DC became the first act to have an Australian number one album in five consecutive decades (1980s to 2020s). The album registered 21,535 sales in its first week outselling the rest of the top 15 combined. As of 12 December, it has spent four weeks at number one, becoming the equal longest number one album in Australia in 2020.

In the United States, Power Up debuted at number one on the Billboard 200 chart, with 117,000 album-equivalent units (including 111,000 pure sales) in its opening week. It became the band's third album to reach number one on the chart, following For Those About to Rock We Salute You (1981) and Black Ice (2008). Additionally, the album's tracks accumulated a total 7.8 million on-demand streams in the week ending 28 November.

The album debuted at number one on the UK Albums Chart on 13 November 2020 with 62,000 chart sales, displacing Kylie Minogue's Disco as biggest opening week release of 2020 so far. In Germany, it debuted at number one, selling almost 160,000 copies, the best start of the year. It stayed at number one for a total of five non-consecutive weeks, and became the best selling album of 2020. Worldwide, it was the sixth best selling album of 2020 with 1.37 million copies sold.

== Track listing ==
All tracks are written by Angus Young and Malcolm Young.

Power Up track listing
No.	Title	Length
1.	"Realize"	3:37
2.	"Rejection"	4:06
3.	"Shot in the Dark"	3:06
4.	"Through the Mists of Time"	3:32
5.	"Kick You When You're Down"	3:10
6.	"Witch's Spell"	3:42
7.	"Demon Fire"	3:30
8.	"Wild Reputation"	2:54
9.	"No Man's Land"	3:39
10.	"Systems Down"	3:12
11.	"Money Shot"	3:05
12.	"Code Red"	3:31
Total length:		41:03

== Personnel ==
Credits adapted from the album's liner notes, and the Beyond the Thunder podcast.

AC/DC

- Angus Young – lead guitar, backing vocals
- Brian Johnson – lead vocals
- Cliff Williams – bass guitar, backing vocals
- Phil Rudd – drums
- Stevie Young – rhythm guitar, backing vocals

Production

- Brendan O'Brien – production, mixing
- Mike Fraser – engineering, mixing
- Ryan Smith – mastering
- Billy Bowers – additional engineering
- Zach Blackstone – engineering assistance
- Dominick Civiero – engineering assistance
- Kyle Stevens – mix engineering assistance
- Matt Tuggle – mix engineering assistance
- Colin Kadlec – mix engineering assistance
- Richard Jones – equipment technician
- Trace Foster – equipment technician
- Simon Murton – equipment technician
- Josh Cheuse – creative direction and photography, art direction and design
- Michelle Holme – art direction and design
- Ben Ib – cover art

== Charts ==
=== Weekly charts ===
Weekly chart performance for Power Up
Chart (2020–2021)	Peak position
Argentine Albums (CAPIF)	1
Australian Albums (ARIA)	1
Austrian Albums (Ö3 Austria)	1
Belgian Albums (Ultratop Flanders)	2
Belgian Albums (Ultratop Wallonia)	1
Canadian Albums (Billboard)	1
Croatian International Albums (HDU)	1
Czech Albums (ČNS IFPI)	3
Danish Albums (Hitlisten)	2
Dutch Albums (Album Top 100)	2
Finnish Albums (Suomen virallinen lista)	1
French Albums (SNEP)	1
German Albums (Offizielle Top 100)	1
Greek Albums (IFPI)	1
Hungarian Albums (MAHASZ)	1
Irish Albums (Official Charts)	1
Italian Albums (FIMI)	1
Japanese Albums (Oricon)	11
Japanese Hot Albums (Billboard)	9
New Zealand Albums (RMNZ)	1
Norwegian Albums (VG-lista)	1
Polish Albums (ZPAV)	2
Portuguese Albums (AFP)	1
Scottish Albums (Official Charts)	1
Slovak Albums (ČNS IFPI)	15
Spanish Albums (Promusicae)	1
Swedish Albums (Sverigetopplistan)	1
Swiss Albums (Schweizer Hitparade)	1
UK Albums (Official Charts)	1
UK Rock & Metal Albums (Official Charts)	1
US Billboard 200	1
US Top Rock Albums (Billboard)	1
US Top Hard Rock Albums (Billboard)	1

=== Year-end charts ===
Year-end chart performance for Power Up
Chart (2020)	Position
Australian Albums (ARIA)	4
Austrian Albums (Ö3 Austria)	1
Belgian Albums (Ultratop Flanders)	40
Belgian Albums (Ultratop Wallonia)	15
Dutch Albums (Album Top 100)	72
French Albums (SNEP)	9
German Albums (Offizielle Top 100)	1
Hungarian Albums (MAHASZ)	16
Italian Albums (FIMI)	35
Polish Albums (ZPAV)	19
Portuguese Albums (AFP)	9
Spanish Albums (PROMUSICAE)	19
Swedish Albums (Sverigetopplistan)	75
Swiss Albums (Schweizer Hitparade)	1
UK Albums (OCC)	26

Chart (2021)	Position
Australian Albums (ARIA)	96
Austrian Albums (Ö3 Austria)	32
Belgian Albums (Ultratop Flanders)	138
Belgian Albums (Ultratop Wallonia)	63
French Albums (SNEP)	103
German Albums (Offizielle Top 100)	3
Hungarian Albums (MAHASZ)	78
Portuguese Albums (AFP)	47
Spanish Albums (PROMUSICAE)	51
Swiss Albums (Schweizer Hitparade)	5
US Billboard 200	174
US Top Rock Albums (Billboard)	34
US Top Hard Rock Albums (Billboard)	11

== Certifications and sales ==
Certifications and sales for Power Up
Region	Certification	Certified units/sales
Australia (ARIA)	Gold	35,000^{‡}
Austria (IFPI Austria)	Platinum	15,000^{‡}
Canada (Music Canada)	Gold	40,000^{‡}
France (SNEP)	2× Platinum	200,000^{‡}
Germany (BVMI)	2× Platinum	400,000^{‡}
Italy (FIMI)	Gold	25,000^{‡}
Poland (ZPAV)	Platinum	20,000^{‡}
Spain (Promusicae)	Platinum	40,000^{‡}
Sweden (GLF)	Gold	15,000^{‡}
Switzerland (IFPI Switzerland)	Platinum	20,000^{‡}
United Kingdom (BPI)	Gold	100,000^{‡}
Summaries
Worldwide (IFPI)	—	1,400,000
^{‡} Sales+streaming figures based on certification alone.
