= No Sweat (Geordie album) =

Studio album by Geordie
- Released: 1983
- Recorded: 1982–83
- Genre: Glam rock; hard rock
- Length: 33:39 (Original); 49:00 (CD)
- Label: Neat Records / Castle
- Producer: Geordie

Geordie chronology
No Good Woman (1978)	No Sweat (1983)

No Sweat is the fifth and final studio album by British glam rock band Geordie and the only one the band recorded without their original vocalist Brian Johnson who joined AC/DC. This album was released in 1983 by Neat records and reissued, on CD, in 2002 by Castle records, with 4 additional bonus tracks.

New vocalist (Dr. Rob) Rob Turnbull's vocal delivery was critically noted as cleaner than Brian Johnson, being more reminiscent of Saxon's Biff Byford.

Professional ratings
Review scores
Source	Rating
Allmusic	link

== Track listing ==
All tracks written by Geordie.

1. "No Sweat" – 3:26
2. "This Time" – 2:49
3. "Move Away" – 3:49
4. "Time to Run" – 3:58
5. "So You Lose Again" – 3:46
6. "Rock'n'Roll" – 4:57
7. "Oh No!" – 3:30
8. "Hungry" – 3:43
9. "We Make It Rock" – 3:37
10. "No Sweat" (bonus on CD – live BBC, 1982) – 3:20
11. "So You Lose Again" (bonus on CD – live BBC, 1982) – 3:32
12. "Rock'n'Roll" (bonus on CD – live BBC, 1982) – 4:19
13. "Move Away" (bonus on CD – live BBC, 1982) – 4:10

== Personnel ==
- Vic Malcolm – guitar
- Rob Turnbull – vocals
- Tom Hill – bass guitar
- Brian Gibson – drums
- David Stephenson – guitar
