= The Casanovas =

Australian musical group

- Origin: Melbourne, Victoria, Australia
- Genres: Alternative rock; hard rock
- Years active: 1999–present
- Labels: Rubber
- Members: Tommy Boyce; Jimmy Lewis; Brett Wolfenden
- Past members: Patrick Boyce; Damian Campbell; James Saunders; Jordan Stanley
- Website: thecasanovas.com.au

The Casanovas are an Australian hard rock band, which formed in 1999 by Patrick Boyce on drums, his brother Tommy on lead vocals and guitar, and Jimmy Lewis on bass guitar. They have released an EP Keep It Hot (2002), and five albums, The Casanovas (2004), All Night Long (2006), Terra Casanova (2015), Reptilian Overlords (2020) and Backseat Rhythms (2023).

== History ==
The Casanovas were formed in late 1999 in Melbourne as a hard rock trio by brothers Patrick "Paddy" Boyce on drums and Tommy Boyce (a.k.a. Tommy Love) on lead vocals and lead guitar, with Jimmy Lewis on bass guitar. They released their debut single, "10 Outta 10", in August 2000. They added another guitarist, James Saunders shortly after. Their first extended play, Keep It Hot was released in September 2002. During 2002 Saunders left and Lewis was replaced on bass by Damian "Damo" Campbell.

Starting in December 2002 they toured Australia, United Kingdom and supported New Zealand group, the Datsuns, for their European tour. This was followed by five dates in the United States in March 2003. Their single, "Shake It", received considerable Triple J airplay. Carly Sticpewich of Oz Music Project described it as "hip-shaking rock turned up to 11 that you can get drunk to while you figure out how you're going to become as cool as singer/guitarist Tommy Love. Which, of course, is impossible because rock stars as cool as this are damn hard to imitate. Eat your heart out."

They toured with the Datsuns, again, in October 2003 to New Zealand. They followed by two more Australian tours; one with the Living End in November–December. In December 2003 Paddy Boyce left the group and was replaced on drums by Jordan "Jaws" Stanley (ex-the Onyas) in the following January. Campbell explained "It was long time coming and everyone is still on good relations but Paddy just wanted to go and do other projects... We had to train [Stanley] up nice and quick. His first two shows were in Sydney with the Darkness and then The Big Day Out. That's putting the pressure on."

They followed by another tour in early 2004 with Starky and the Specimens. Their debut self-titled album, was released in May 2004. Oz Music Project's Tim Coyle felt they "have been cruising on the groundswell of enthusiasm for four-square beats and power chord + clever-dick-solo guitar pyrotechnics, providing their rock mission statement."

AllMusic's Eduardo Rivadavia observed that they "not only succeed at pulling off mirror-image AC/DC blues bombers like 'Livin' in the City', 'Shake It', and evergreen first single, '10 Outta 10', with remarkably little evident guilt; they also know how and when to step out of the box without embarrassing themselves." They went on to play some dates in New York City in July and then a tour of Japan in September 2004.

A second album, All Night Long was released in 2006, from which they have released two singles, "Born to Run" and "California". Born to Run was featured on the soundtrack of video game publisher EA Sports' title, Rugby 06, as well as being the main song for Melbourne-based video game developers IR Gurus' title, AFL Premiership 2006, whilst Shake It was used in three Videogames: F1 2011 (Codemasters), WRC 4 (Evolution Studios) and This is Football 2005 (London Studio) .

Their third Album Terra Casanova was released in 2015, their fourth, Reptilian Overlord, in 2020, and their fifth Backseat Rhythms in August 2023.

In late 2024, Damian Campbell parted ways with the band and was replaced by original member Jimmy Lewis.

== Band members ==
Current

- Tommy Boyce – vocals, guitar
- Jimmy Lewis - vocals, bass
- Brett "Wolfie" Wolfenden – drums

Former

- James "Fatty" Saunders – guitar, vocals (2000–2001)
- Patrick Boyce – drums (1999–2003)
- Jordan "Jaws" Stanley – drums (2003–2019)
- Damian Campbell – bass, vocals (2002–2024)

== Discography ==
=== Studio albums ===
List of studio albums with chart positions and certifications
Title	Details	Peak chart positions
Title	Details	AUS
The Casanovas	Released: April 2004; Label: Rubber Records (RUB161); Format: CD	72
All Night Long	Released: July 2006; Label: Rubber Records (RUB217); Format: CD	85
Terra Casanova	Released: 30 July 2015; Label: Rubber Records (RUB288); Format: CD	-
Reptilian Overlord	Released: 28 August 2020; Label: Rubber Records; Format: CD, Vinyl	-
Backseat Rhythms	Released: 25 August 2023; Label: Rubber Records; Format: CD, Vinyl	-

=== Extended plays ===
List of EPS with selected details
Title	Details
... Keep It Hot	Released: September 2002; Label: Rubber Records (RUB147); Format: CD

=== Singles ===
List of singles as lead artist and chart position
Title	Year	Peak chart positions	Album
Title	Year	AUS	Album
"10 Outta 10"	2000	-	... Keep It Hot
"Nasty"	2002	-	... Keep It Hot
"Shake It"	2003	-	The Casanovas
"Let It Ride"	2003	-	non-album single
"No Time for Love"	2004	66	The Casanovas
"Livin' in the City"	2004	-	The Casanovas
"Heartbeat"	2005	-	The Casanovas
"Born to Run"	2006	-	All Night Long
"California"	2006	24	All Night Long
"The Most Hated Man in Melbourne"	2011	-	non-album single
"Hollywood Riot"	2019	-	Reptilian Overlord
"Red Hot"	2020	-	Reptilian Overlord
"The Devil In Me"	2023	-	Backseat Rhythms
"The Lover"	2023	-	Backseat Rhythms
"When You Want Something From Me"	2023	-	Backseat Rhythms

== Awards and nominations ==
=== ARIA Music Awards ===
The ARIA Music Awards is an annual awards ceremony that recognises excellence, innovation, and achievement across all genres of Australian music. They commenced in 1987.

Year	Nominee / work	Award	Result	Ref.
2002	"Shake It"	Breakthrough Artist - Single	Nominated	
