= Masters of Rock (Geordie album) =

Geordie - Masters of Rock

Compilation album by Geordie
- Released: 1974
- Label: EMI

Geordie chronology
Don't Be Fooled by the Name (1974)	Geordie - Masters of Rock (1974)	Save the World (1976)

Geordie – Masters of Rock is a compilation album by rock band Geordie. It was released in 1974 by EMI.

== Track listing ==
1. "House of the Rising Sun" (traditional, arranged by Geordie)
2. "All Because of You" (Malcolm)
3. "Can you do it" (Malcolm)
4. "Give you till Monday" (Malcolm)
5. "Red Eyed Lady" (Malcolm)
6. "Don't do that" (Malcolm)
7. "Ride on Baby" (Geordie)
8. "Keep On Rocking" (Malcolm)
9. "Black Cat Woman" (Malcolm)
10. "Electric Lady" (Malcolm)
11. "Natural Born Loser" (Malcolm)
12. "Ain't it just like a Woman" (Malcolm)

== Personnel ==
- Brian Johnson (vocals)
- Vic Malcolm (guitar)
- Tom Hill (bass)
- Brian Gibson (drums)
