= Wor Geordie's lost his penka =

Song

Song
- Language: English (Geordie)
- Written: Unknown
- Songwriter(s): Traditional

"Wor Geordie's Lost His Penka" (or ... His Liggie) is a Geordie folk song, the origins of which are unknown. The 'penka' was the large marble that the other marbles or 'liggies' were rolled at, in a game of marbles. It is Roud Folk Song Index no. S226413.
