= Geordie (band) =

British rock band

- Geordie in 1973. L–R: Brian Gibson, Tom Hill, Brian Johnson, and Vic Malcolm.

Background information
- Also known as: Powerhouse, USA
- Origin: Newcastle, England
- Genres: Glam rock; hard rock
- Years active: 1972–1980, 1982–1985, 2001, 2018–present
- Labels: Regal Zonophone; EMI; Bellaphon; MGM (US); Neat
- Members: Terry Slesser; Steve Dawson; Tom Hill; Brian Gibson
- Past members: Brian Johnson; Vic Malcolm; Rob Turnbull; David Stephenson; Micky Bennison

Geordie (/ˈdʒɔːrdi/ JOR-dee) are a British rock band from Newcastle upon Tyne initially active in the 1970s with notable songs such as "Don't Do That", "All Because of You", "Can You Do It", "Electric Lady" and "Goodbye Love".

== History ==
=== Formation (1971–1980) ===
The original Geordie line-up (from February 1972) included: Vic Malcolm (lead guitar), Tom Hill (bass guitar), Brian Gibson (drums) and Brian Johnson (lead vocals). Their first single, "Don't Do That" broke into the Top 40 of the UK Singles Chart in December 1972. In March 1973, Geordie released their debut album, Hope You Like It on EMI label. Trying to compete with such British glam rock outfits as Slade and Sweet (Geordie supported the former on a UK tour, as well as the latter at a concert at the Rainbow Club, London in March 1973), they achieved UK Top 10 status with "All Because of You" (April 1973) and had a UK Top 20 hit with "Can You Do It" (July 1973). They also had several appearances on BBC Television including 15 appearances on Top of the Pops, one of which was in November 1972.

In the early 1970s, Geordie toured Australia regularly and gained a solid following in Newcastle, New South Wales, due to the "Newcastle" connection and the song "Geordie's Lost his Liggie" gained popularity and airplay in Newcastle. They were one of the regular touring bands to play at the art deco Savoy Theatre in Lambton. Their second album, Don't Be Fooled by the Name (1974), including a cover of the traditional "House of the Rising Sun", failed to yield a hit.

After their 1976 album Save the World, frontman Johnson left for a solo project. The band's album, No Good Woman, in 1978 consisted of three unreleased tracks with Johnson and new material recorded by Malcolm with future Dire Straits keyboardist Alan Clark, vocalist Dave Ditchburn, bassist Frank Gibbon, and drummer George Defty. Johnson had meanwhile begun to perform as Geordie in a new line-up, sometimes also called Geordie II, in which he was the only original member. The band signed a recording contract in 1980, but finally folded that spring when Johnson replaced Bon Scott in AC/DC.

=== Post break-up and reunion tour of Geordie II (1980–2018) ===
After AC/DC's lead singer Bon Scott died in February 1980, AC/DC chose Brian Johnson (whose vocal talent had previously been praised by Scott) to take over lead vocal duties. Johnson travelled with the band and producer Robert John "Mutt" Lange to Compass Point Studios in The Bahamas to write and record the follow-up to their 1979 album Highway To Hell. This would lead to the release of AC/DC's Back in Black in May 1980. Back in Black would eventually go on to become the second-best selling album of all time.

In 1982, the original members, minus Johnson, re-grouped as a quintet with new singer Rob Turnbull and additional guitarist David Stephenson. They went on to record an album titled No Sweat in 1983. The album was released on heavy metal independent record label, Neat Records. It was critically acclaimed but had no major success. In 1985/6, Malcolm, Gibson and Stephenson left, and a new line up subsequently changed their name to Powerhouse, to release an eponymous album in 1986, before calling it a day yet again.

At the end of 2001, during an AC/DC hiatus, Johnson had a one-off reunion, for a short UK tour, with Geordie's 1977–80 line-up, performing largely hard rock cover versions. They were known as Geordie II.

Rob Turnbull (Dr. Rob) is a member of the band Gadji as of 2013. In 2014, Vic Malcolm formed a new band, Dynamite, with Rick Mort and recorded an album, Rock 'Til You Drop, in 2014 on indie label Tabitha Records.

=== Revival (2018–present) ===
Two of the original founder members, bassist Tom Hill, and drummer Brian Gibson relaunched Geordie with a new line-up that included Mark Wright on vocals and Steve Dawson of Animals II on guitar. January 2022 saw Terry Slesser of Paul Kossoff's post Free band, Back Street Crawler take over vocal duties. Original guitarist Vic Malcolm is still involved with the band in a songwriting capacity only. The group launched a YouTube channel with an announcement of the band re-formation. New material has subsequently been released featuring Terry and is available on most streaming platforms. An official band website was launched in early 2023.

== Band members ==
1972–1977:

- Brian Johnson (vocals)
- Vic Malcolm (guitar, vocals) (1972-1975, 1976–1977)
- Tom Hill (bass)
- Brian Gibson (drums)
- Micky Bennison (guitar) (1975-1976)

1978:

- Dave Ditchburn (vocals)
- Vic Malcolm (guitar)
- Alan Clark (keyboards)
- Frank Gibbon (bass)
- George Defty (drums)

Geordie II – 1977–1980, 2001:

- Brian Johnson (vocals)
- Derek Rootham (guitar)
- Dave Robson (bass)
- Davy Whittaker (drums)
- Terry Slesser (vocals; replaced Johnson in 1980)

1982–1985:

- Rob Turnbull (vocals)
- Vic Malcolm (guitar)
- David Stephenson (guitar)
- Tom Hill (bass)
- Brian Gibson (drums)

1986:

- Rob Turnbull (vocals)
- Martin Metcalf (guitar)
- Tom Hill (bass)
- Brian Gibson (drums)

2018–2022:

- Mark Wright (vocals)
- Steve Dawson (guitar)
- Tom Hill (bass)
- Brian Gibson (drums)

2022–present:

- Terry Slesser (vocals)
- Steve Dawson (guitar)
- Tom Hill (bass)
- Brian Gibson (drums)

== Discography ==
=== Studio albums (as Geordie) ===
- Hope You Like It (1973) (Red Bus)
- Don't Be Fooled by the Name (1974) (Red Bus)
- Save the World (1976) (Red Bus)
- No Good Woman (1978) (Red Bus – Landmark)
- No Sweat (1983) (Neat Records)

=== Studio album (as Powerhouse) ===
- Powerhouse (1986) (Ambush/EMI)

=== Compilation albums ===
- Masters of Rock (1974) (EMI)
- Geordie featuring Brian Johnson (1980) (Red Bus)
- Strange Man (1982) (compilation) (Red Bus)
- Keep on Rocking (1989) (digitally remixed & remastered) (Anchor/DCC)
- Rocking with the Boys (1992) (Australian compilation) (Raven)
- A Band from Geordieland (1996) (compilation – 24 tracks) (Repertoire)
- The Very Best of Geordie (1997) (compilation) (CMC/Play records)
- The Best of Geordie (1998) (compilation) (Platinum)
- Can You Do It? (1999) (compilation) (Delta)
- The Singles Collection (2001) (compilation) (7T's records)
- No Sweat (2002) (re-release compiled with 4 live sessions recorded at the BBC) (Castle Records)
- Can You Do It (2003) (compilation) (Pickwick – Holland)
- Unreleased Tapes (2005) (12 rare tracks) (OVC Media – Russia) **Not Geordie (Tom Hill, July 2023)**
- The Very Best of Geordie – The original versions (2009) (compilation) (Spectre/Universal records)
- Keep on Rockin' – The Very Best Of (2009) (compilation) (Spectre/Universal records)
- Greatest Hits (2012) (compilation) (Zebra Studio records)
- The Albums (2016) 5 CD 66 track set of all five albums recorded by Geordie.

=== Singles ===
Year	Single	Peak chart positions						
Year	Single	UK	AUS	BE (FLA)	DEN	GER	IRE	NL
1972	"Don't Do That"	32	—	—	—	—	—	—
1973	"All Because of You"	6	—	6	30	11	19	
1973	"Can You Do It"	13	69	30	14	22	—	25
1973	"Electric Lady"	32	—	—	—	32	—	—
1973	"Black Cat Woman"	—	—	—	—	36	—	—
1974	"Got to Know" (Australia-only release)	—	—	—	—	—	—	—
1974	"House of the Rising Sun" (Japan-only release)	—	—	—	—	—	—	—
1974	"Goin' Down" (France-only release)	—	—	—	—	—	—	—
1974	"She's a Teaser"	—	—	—	—	—	—	—
1974	"Ride on Baby"	—	—	—	—	—	—	—
1975	"Goodbye Love"	—	—	—	—	—	—	—
1980	"Treat Her Like a Lady"	—	—	—	—	—	—	—
1981	"Don't Do That"	—	—	—	—	—	—	—
1981	"Rockin' with the Boys" (Canada-only release)	—	—	—	—	—	—	—
1982	"Nutbush City Limits"	—	—	—	—	—	—	—
2022	"Red, White and Blue"	—	—	—	—	—	—	—
2023	"She's My Sugar"	—	—	—	—	—	—	—
2023	"See You Now"	—	—	—	—	—	—	—
"—" denotes releases that did not chart or were not released in that territory.

== See also ==
- List of glam rock artists
- List of bands from Newcastle, United Kingdom
- List of performers on Top of the Pops
