= Cliff Williams =

Musical artist (born 1949)

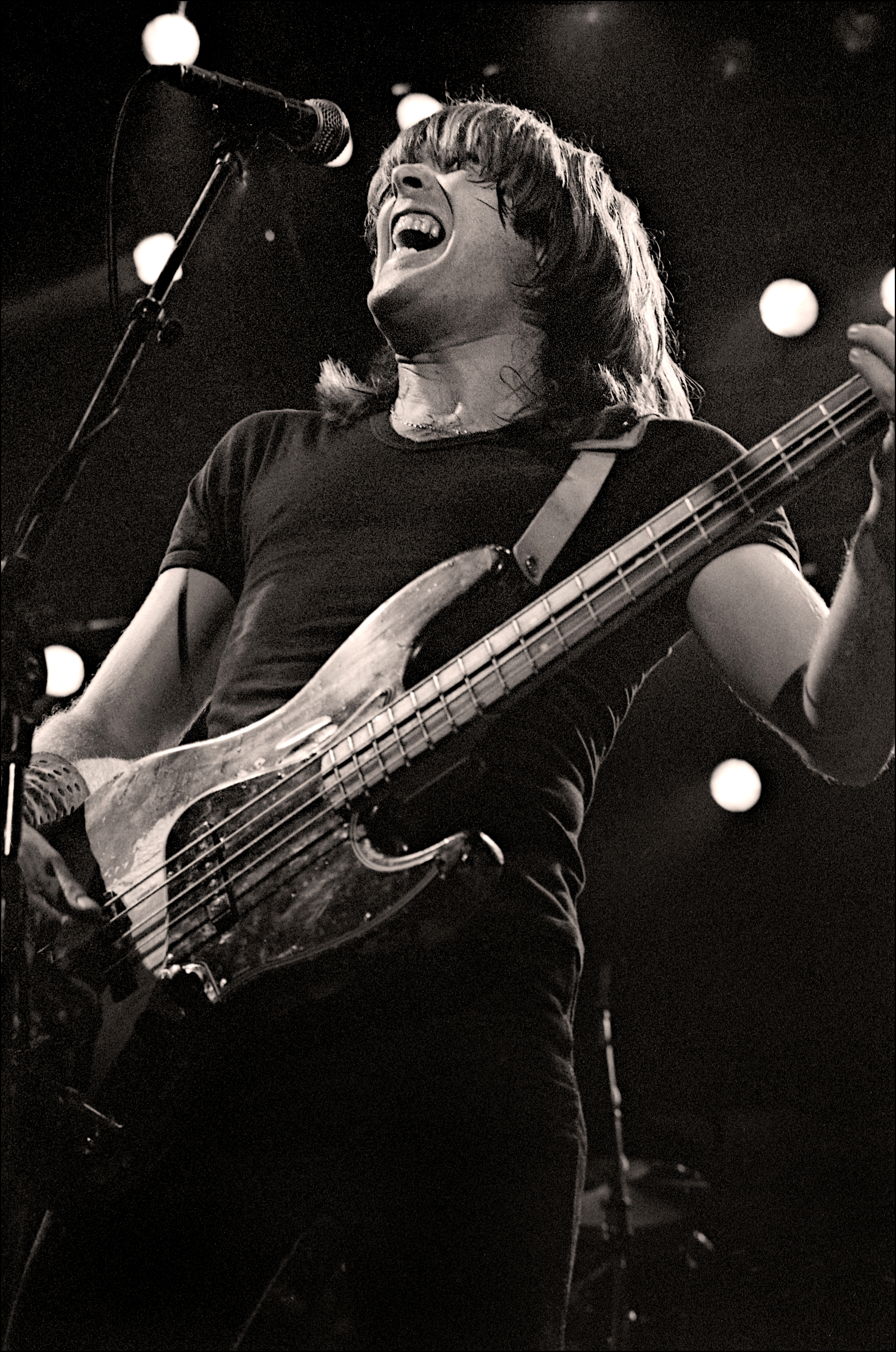
- Williams performing with AC/DC in 1982

Background information
- Born: Clifford Williams; 14 December 1949 (age 76); Romford, Essex, England
- Origin: Hoylake, Merseyside, England
- Genres: Hard rock; heavy metal; blues rock; rock and roll; progressive rock
- Occupations: Musician; singer
- Instruments: Bass; vocals
- Years active: 1966–2016, 2018–present
- Label: Columbia
- Member of: AC/DC; The Juice
- Formerly of: Home; Sugar
- Website: acdc.com

Clifford Williams (born 14 December 1949) is an English musician, best known as the bassist and backing vocalist of the Australian hard rock band AC/DC. He started his professional music career in 1967 and had previously been in the English groups Home and Bandit. His first studio album with AC/DC was Powerage in 1978. Williams was inducted into the American Rock and Roll Hall of Fame as a member of AC/DC in 2003. Williams announced his retirement from AC/DC in 2016, but returned for their 2020 comeback album Power Up along with bandmates Brian Johnson and Phil Rudd. His side projects include benefit concerts.

== Early life ==
Clifford Williams was born on 14 December 1949 in Romford, Essex. In 1961, he moved with his family to Hoylake, Merseyside, where he was influenced by the local Merseybeat movement and decided to become a musician. At the age of 13, he and some friends formed a band. He listed the Rolling Stones, the Who, the Kinks, and blues musicians such as Bo Diddley as influences, and mostly learned to play bass by "listening to records and picking out notes", with his formal training limited to some lessons from a professional bassist in nearby Liverpool. He left school when he was 16 years old, working as an engineer by day and musician by night.

== Career ==
=== Early career ===
In 1966, Williams moved to London, where he worked at a demolition site and in supermarkets while playing in various short-lived bands. He met guitarist Laurie Wisefield (later a member of Wishbone Ash) and the two became members of a band, Sugar, which soon broke up. In 1970, Williams and Wisefield joined with singer Mick Stubbs, keyboardist Clive John, and drummer Mick Cox to form the progressive rock group Home. The band signed a recording deal with Epic Records and issued their debut LP, Pause for a Hoarse Horse, in 1971. Home was a supporting act for Jeff Beck, Mott the Hoople, The Faces and Led Zeppelin.

In 1972, Jim Anderson replaced John on keyboards and Home released a self-titled album, featuring their only hit single, "Dreamer", which peaked at No. 41 in the UK album charts. Their next album, The Alchemist, followed in 1973, but did not gain chart success. When British folk singer-songwriter Al Stewart suggested that Home back him on his first American tour in March 1974, Mick Stubbs left the group. The remaining members formed the Al Stewart Band but split up after the tour. Williams briefly played with the American band Stars before forming Bandit in 1974. Bandit's line-up included vocalist Jim Diamond and drummer Graham Broad (later in Bucks Fizz and Roger Waters's band). The group signed with Arista Records and released a self-titled album in 1977. Bandit also performed as Alexis Korner's backing band on 1977's The Lost Album before disbanding later that year.

=== AC/DC ===
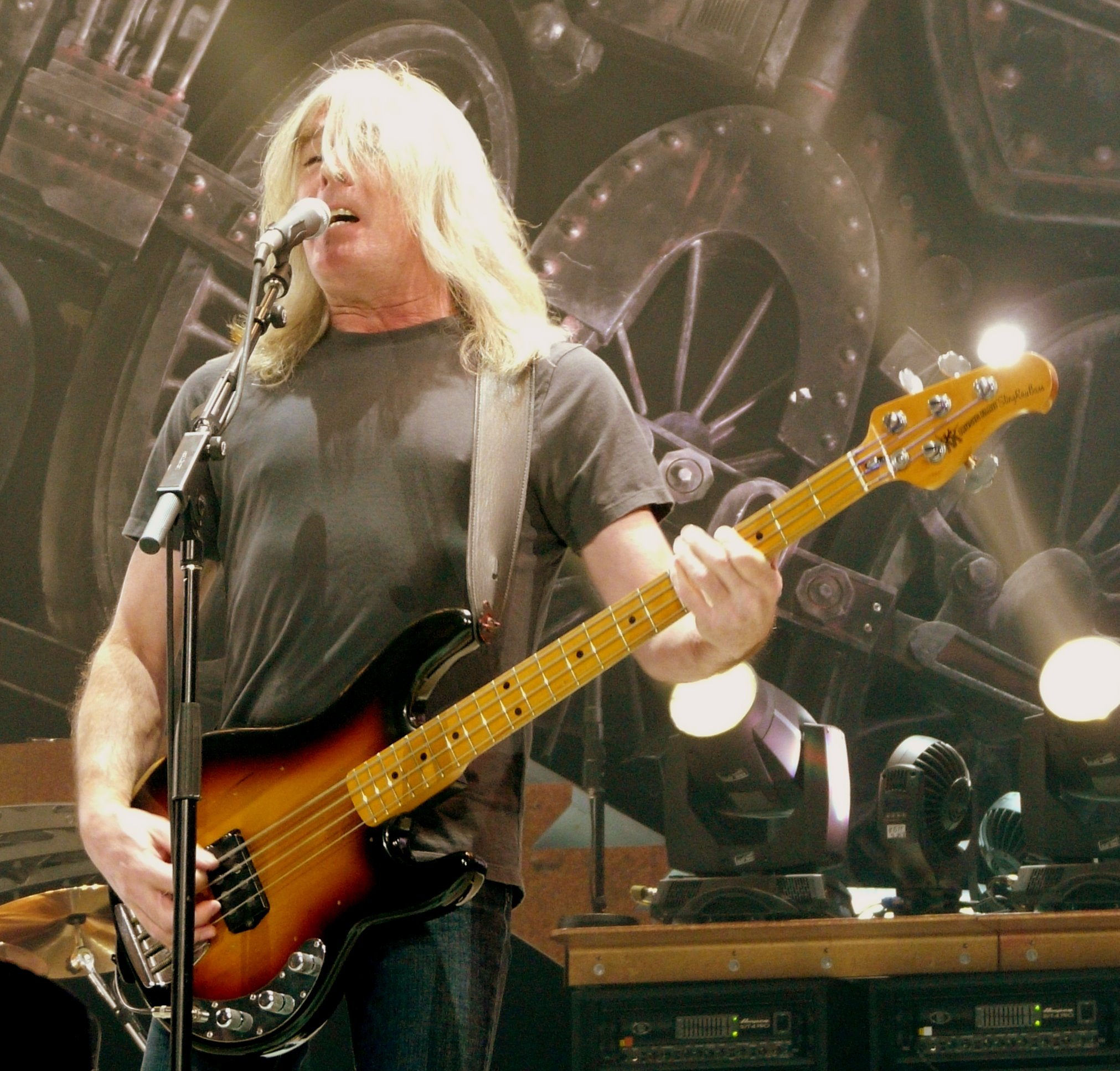
Williams performing with AC/DC in 2008

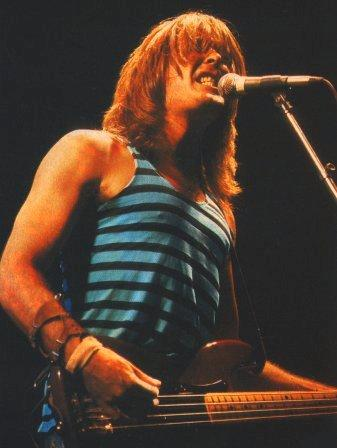
Williams performing with AC/DC in 1981

Williams considered retiring from music following Bandit's breakup, but one of the group's guitarists, Jimmy Litherland, convinced him to audition for the Australian group AC/DC, who were looking for a bassist after firing Mark Evans shortly after recording their 1977 studio album Let There Be Rock. AC/DC had formed in Australia in 1973 and by mid-1977 the line-up was Malcolm Young on rhythm guitar and backing vocals alongside his brother Angus Young on lead guitar, Phil Rudd on drums and Bon Scott on vocals. Shortly after deciding to audition for the band, Williams saw AC/DC on Top of the Pops and was impressed, describing them as "outrageous".

For his audition, Williams played four jam sessions with the band, and on 27 May 1977 was officially asked to join AC/DC. Angus declared the decision was partially motivated by the bassist's good looks, which the band hoped would attract more women to their concerts. As Williams was replacing an Australian musician, there were issues resulting in problems obtaining a work permit to enter the country. His first performances with AC/DC were in Australia supporting the Let There Be Rock album, with two secret gigs at Sydney's Lifesaver. The album Powerage (1978), produced by Vanda & Young, marked Williams's studio debut. Williams remained in AC/DC from that time onwards until 2016, with only a temporary departure in 1991 as he suffered a kidney infection, during which Paul Greg had to play bass for some North American concerts in the Razors Edge World Tour. In addition to his role as bassist with AC/DC, Williams also contributed backing vocals. He has said that his favourite albums with the band are Powerage and Back in Black. On 7 July 2016, Williams announced his plans to retire from the music industry following AC/DC's Rock or Bust World Tour. He cited his opinion that AC/DC was now "a changed animal" with the recent departures of several core band members; Malcolm Young could no longer contribute due to dementia, Phil Rudd could not tour due to being under house arrest, and Brian Johnson was forced into retirement due to hearing problems. In September 2016, during his last performance with AC/DC at the Wells Fargo Center in Philadelphia, Williams was brought to the front of the stage by Angus Young to take a bow in the middle of "For Those About to Rock (We Salute You)". On September 30, 2020, AC/DC officially confirmed that Williams, along with bandmates Brian Johnson and Phil Rudd, have rejoined the band. Though he performed with the band at the Power Trip Festival in October 2023, Williams is not currently touring with AC/DC on their Power Up Tour, with Chris Chaney performing in his place.

=== Side projects ===
In 1984, Williams played bass and backing vocals on Adam Bomb's song "I Want My Heavy Metal", for the album Fatal Attraction. During AC/DC's hiatus in the 2000s, Williams joined Bosnian musician Emir Bukovica's band Emir & Frozen Camels. The group recorded the album San in 2002 and played in some European clubs. In 2005, Williams and AC/DC singer Johnson played in a hurricane relief event in Florida, promoted by the John Entwistle Foundation. There Williams met drummer Steve Luongo, president of the foundation and former member of the John Entwistle band. Luongo later brought Williams, Johnson, and guitarist Mark Hitt for the Classic Rock Cares charity project. The quartet composed and recorded ten tracks in the studio in 2007, and followed that with a tour to raise funds for the foundation. In 2011, Williams played on a benefit concert organized by Mark Farner. Williams said he also occasionally plays with a rhythm and blues band from Fort Myers called The Juice.

== Style and accolades ==
Williams' role in AC/DC was to provide steady but basic basslines which followed the rhythm guitar of Malcolm Young, consisting mostly of eighth notes. His basslines were sometimes written by Malcolm and Angus Young during composition, and at other times Williams developed them based on the other instrumental tracks. Williams has said of his playing, "It's not the [bass] line that counts. It is the feel. My favorite AC/DC tune to play is 'Down Payment Blues', because it's so simple. I play four notes throughout the song, but I get off on the whole thing—not me noodlin' away." He also said that he plays "the same thing in every song, for the most part [...] in AC/DC's music, the song is more important than any individual's bit in it". He added that "complex [bass] lines wouldn't add anything to a guitar-oriented band like [AC/DC], so [he tries] to create a bottom layer that drives what [AC/DC's] guys are doing on top". Williams had no difficulty keeping his low profile within the band, declaring, "I don't have any problem doing this, because I enjoy playing simply. I never feel angry or prisoner." Nevertheless, he very occasionally employs more melodic lines and passing notes on some songs, such as "Satellite Blues", as well as in live performances such as during Angus' solo in "Gone Shootin'". His playing technique is mostly centred around downpicking, with the occasional use of plucking to mute the strings, which he says "adds more definition and tightens up the notes, and it gives the sound less sustain".

Since Williams' introduction to the band, AC/DC has been inducted to the Australian Recording Industry Association's Hall of Fame (in 1988), and the Rock and Roll Hall of Fame (in 2003). In 1982, Williams was chosen as "Bassist of the Year" in a vote conducted by Kerrang! magazine.

=== Equipment ===
In his first appearance in 1977, he used a Gibson Ripper only for the "Let There Be Rock" music video. Williams' trademark instrument is the StingRay and other basses by Music Man, strung with Ernie Ball (.045, .065, .085, .105) flatwounds in the studio and D'Addario roundwound XLs in the same gauge in concert. In October 2020, Ernie Ball Music Man announced that they are releasing a Cliff Williams Signature Bass which will be a genuine replica of his 1979 Music Man StingRay bass. Williams states that despite trying other basses over the years, he always went back to Music Man's instruments, which he described as "a tremendous work horse of a bass". Other basses used include the Fender Precision Bass, a Gibson Thunderbird non-reverse, Fender Jazz Bass, the Steinberger L-series, a Gibson EB-3 and at least two LAG Custom basses. Williams used 3 Ampeg SVT-810E cabinets with 2 SVT-4PRO Heads, but if there was any interference with the wireless systems, he used cables in his live performances.

== Personal life ==
Williams married his American wife Georganne in 1980. They have two children, including Erin Lucas and Luke (born 1986). The couple initially settled in Hawaii, but this left them feeling too isolated, and they found the school system to be lacking. In 1986, they moved to Fort Myers, Florida, at the suggestion of AC/DC bandmate and nearby resident Brian Johnson. Williams also spends time in Aix-en-Provence, where he has distant relatives. Williams' hobbies include fishing, flying, and wine.
