= National Weather Service Nashville, Tennessee =

- Types: branch
- Location: Old Hickory
- Country: United States
- Parent organisations: National Weather Service
- Website: www.weather.gov/ohx/

National Weather Service Nashville is a weather forecast office responsible for monitoring weather conditions for 38 counties in Middle Tennessee. The office is in charge of weather forecasts, warnings, and local statements as well as aviation weather. It is equipped with a WSR-88D (NEXRAD) radar and an Automated Surface Observing System (ASOS) that greatly increases the ability to forecast. While it is officially the Nashville forecast office, the WFO is technically located in Wilson County near Old Hickory, Tennessee, along the shoreline of Old Hickory Lake near the Davidson/Wilson County line.

The Weather Service Office of Nashville was awarded the United States Department of Commerce Bronze Medal Award for superior federal service three times, in December 1998, May 2007, and April 2010. All three instances were for providing life-saving services for the three major tornado outbreaks that occurred in Middle Tennessee in April 1998, April 2006, and February 2008, respectively.

== NOAA Weather Radio ==
The National Weather Service Forecast Office in Old Hickory, Tennessee provides programming for 12 NOAA Weather Radio stations.

=== Weather radio stations ===
Station	Frequency (MHz)	City of license	Transmitter power
KIG79	162.55	Nashville	1,000 Watts
KWN52	162.525	Lobelville	1,000 Watts
KWN53	162.45	Centerville	300 watts
WNG629	162.45	Spencer	1,000 watts
WNG631	162.525	Lafayette	1,000 watts
WWF84	162.425	Lawrenceburg	1,000 watts
WWH37	162.5	Clarksville	300 watts
WXK61	162.4	Cookeville	1,000 watts
WXK62	162.4	Waverly	1,000 watts
WXK63	162.475	Shelbyville	1,000 watts
WXN74	162.5	Hickman	1,000 watts
WZ2506	162.5	Clifton	1,000 watts
