= Roberto Danova =

- Born: Giacinto Bettoni; 27 August 1937 (age 89); Verbano-Cusio-Ossola (near Lake Maggiore), Northern Italy
- Origin: Lake Maggiore, Northern Italy
- Genres: Pop, dance, rock, electronic, funk, blues, choral, reggae, soul, instrumental
- Occupations: Composer, arranger, producer
- Years active: 1959–present
- Label: Plaza Records London
- Website: www.plazarecords.net

Roberto Danova (born Giacinto Bettoni; 27 August 1937) is best known as a music composer, arranger and producer.

== Producing, arranging and composing ==
During the 1970s 1980s and 1990s Danova produced, arranged, or had compositions covered by many popular performers, including Joe Dolan (with whom he made a key contribution in the mid-1970s), Johnny Logan (whose career was overseen in the late 1970s by Danova and Louis Walsh), Mungo Jerry, Tom Jones, Demis Roussos, Engelbert Humperdinck, and Showaddywaddy,

Since the mid-1980s Danova has developed an instrumental project General Lafayette, a series of albums and singles featuring some of his own compositions through the sound of the trumpet. From 1977 to 1980, Danova released an album and singles as Roberto Montecristo.

The premiere of his musical The Phantom of the Opera on Ice, featuring a cast of Russian ice skating stars and live singers, played at various locations in the UK between 1995 and 1996. A VHS video was issued in 1999, and a CD/DVD with some modifications was released in 2006 by Plaza Records London.

In 1998 he produced Credo, a musical celebration of the birth of Jesus Christ. The concept album was featured on BBC Radio 3 in April 2001. Also the same year he guested on the Don Maclean BBC Radio 2 show.

Danova was honoured in 2012 by the Irish Country Music Association at a ceremony in Mullingar, County Westmeath, Ireland for his outstanding contribution to Irish Popular Music.

== Record labels ==
- Ritz Records London: 1977–1981 - Established his first production company and label in 1977.
- Plaza Records London: 1981–present - Runs independently alongside his publishing firm Quatermass Music
- Also associated with EMI, Pye Records and Red Bus Music (International) Ltd.

== Selected discography credits ==
- 1972: Hideaway - Pop Tops - peaked 22 German charts - (co-music/lyrics)
- 1973: All Because of You - Geordie featuring Brian Johnson - peaked 6 UK charts - (co-producer)
- 1973: Signorina Concertina - Shuki & Aviva - peaked 3 Swiss charts - (co-writer/producer)
- 1974: Sweet Little Rock'n Roller - Jerry Williams (singer) - (co-writer)
- 1974: Lady Laura - Roberto Blanco - (co-writer)
- 1975: Lady in Blue - Joe Dolan - reported million seller - (co-writer/producer)
- 1975: Crazy Woman Joe Dolan - annual French charts 1975 - (co-writer/producer)
- 1975: Träume Weiter Lady Blue - Bata Illic - (co-writer and producer)
- 1976: Who's That Lady With My Man - Kelly Marie - peaked 4 French charts - (co-writer/producer)
- 1976: When - Red Hurley - peaked 4 Irish charts - (producer)
- 1976: Tennessee Special - Red Hurley - peaked 3 Irish charts and 11 Netherlands charts - (producer)
- 1976: Doktor Bernhard - Bonnie St. Claire - peaked 11 Belgian charts - (co-writer)
- 1977: Who's That Lady With My Man - Patricia Paay - peaked 2 Netherlands charts - (co-writer)
- 1977: Hush Hush Maria - Joe Dolan - peaked 1 South African charts - (co-writer)
- 1978: Où En Est Ma Vie - Michel Louvain - (co-writer)
- 1979: Sweet Little Rock 'n' Roller - Showaddywaddy - peaked 15 UK charts - (co-writer)
- 1979: (Gonna Get Along) Without You Now (disco mix version) - Viola Wills - (mixer)
- 1979: In London - Johnny Logan - peaked 29 Belgian charts - (co-writer/co-producer)
- 1981: More and More - Joe Dolan - peaked 1 Irish charts - (producer)
- 1981: Sister Mary - Joe Dolan - peaked 2 Irish charts - (co-writer/producer)
- 1981: Fire Queen Brian Johnson and Geordie - (producer)
- 1981: The Force - Nancy Nova - (co composed/produced)
- 1983: You Are No Angel - Tom Jones, also covered by Barbara Mandrell. - (co-writer)
- 1986: Loneliness - Brendan Shine - (writer/producer)
- 1986: You Are Temptation - Miami Showband - (composed/produced/arranged)
- 1989: I'll Never Stop Wanting You - Dickie Rock - peaked 10 Irish charts - (producer)
- 1989: Impossible To Do - Linda Martin & General Lafayette - (arranger/producer)
- 1990: D-Day 50th Anniversary - BBC Concert Orchestra & Central Band of the Royal Air Force - (co-producer)
- 1990: Voices Of The Highlands - Karl Denver - (composed/co-produced/arranged)
- 1993: General Lafayette – Angel in Blue, trumpet instrumental - arranged and produced by Danova
- 1994: Nostradamus - Engelbert Humperdinck(re-mixed 2012), - (co-composer/producer)
- 1995: Sister Mary - Demis Roussos - (co-writer)
- 2006: Mr Midnight - Mungo Jerry. - (writer/producer/arranger)
- 2009: Tu Per Me - La Voce Del Nord, by Angelo Camassa - over 20 million YouTube views - (producer)
- 2010: It's Wonderful - Rock Mystery, composed by Angelo Camassa - over 25 million YouTube views - (co-writer / producer)
- 2014 'Pop Songs of the 70s, 80s, 90s, Vol. 3 Various Artists' It's Raining Richard Cocciante
- Further credits; Irish charts Discogs, All Music, 45cat French charts

== Film ==
- 1990: Undercurrents, starring Mary McGuckian - soundtrack song The Woman in Me. - 1987 recording produced by Danova.
- 2017: Hangman, starring Al Pacino - soundtrack song "House of the Rising Sun", Brian Johnson and Geordie - 1974 Geordie recording produced and arranged by Danova.

== Television ==
- 2009: nl:'t Vrije Schaep, featured song Doktor Bernhard, performed by Loes Luca & Hans Kesting - Doktor Bernhard co-written by Danova.
