= Brian Johnson =

English singer (born 1947)

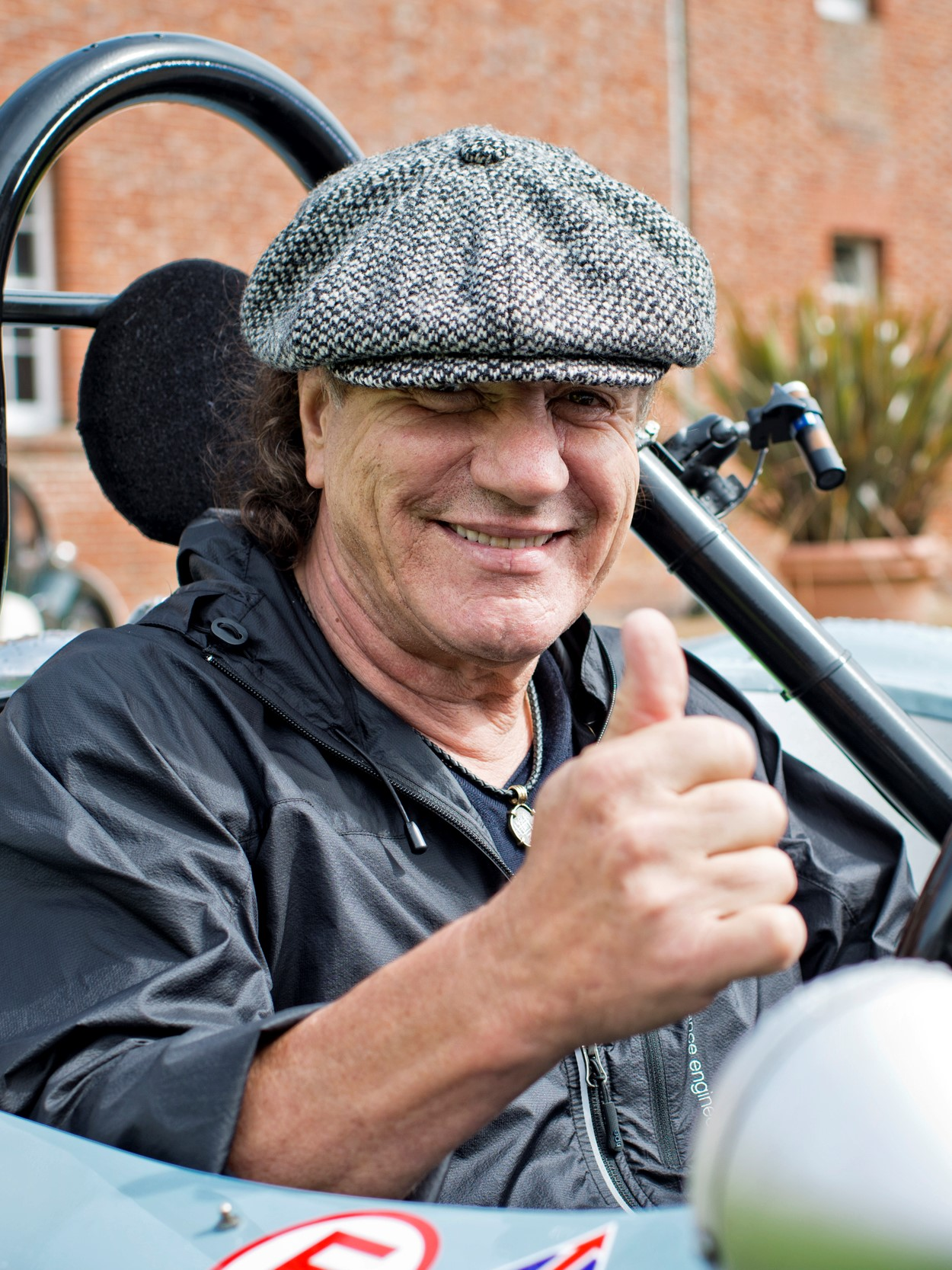
- Johnson in 2014

Background information
- Born: Brian Johnson; 5 October 1947 (age 79); Dunston, County Durham, England
- Genres: Hard rock; rock and roll; blues rock; glam rock
- Occupations: Singer; songwriter
- Years active: 1962–present
- Member of: AC/DC
- Formerly of: Geordie
- Website: brianjohnsonracing.com

Brian Johnson (born 5 October 1947) is an English singer and songwriter. He is the third lead singer of the Australian rock band AC/DC, taking over the role in 1980 after the death of Bon Scott.

Johnson is one of the founding members of the rock band Geordie, which was formed in Newcastle upon Tyne in 1971. After several hit singles, including the UK Top 10 hit "All Because of You" (1973), the band split in 1978. Following the death of Bon Scott on 19 February 1980, Johnson was asked to audition for AC/DC, whose guitarists and founders, Angus and Malcolm Young, remembered when Scott had been impressed with Johnson as Geordie's frontman. Johnson's first album with AC/DC, Back in Black, became the second-best-selling album of all time, according to most estimates. The Guardian ranked the successful transition to Johnson at No. 36 on their list of 50 key events in rock-music history.

Johnson and the rest of the band were inducted into the Rock and Roll Hall of Fame in 2003. In March 2016, he temporarily left the band during the Rock or Bust World Tour because of hearing problems. In September 2020, AC/DC confirmed that Johnson, along with bandmates Phil Rudd and Cliff Williams, had rejoined the group in August 2018 to record the album Power Up.

Johnson is known for his distinctive singing voice and strong Geordie accent. In July 2014, he was awarded an honorary degree of Doctor of Music by Northumbria University in Newcastle in recognition of his significant contribution to the music industry.

== Early life ==
Johnson was born on 5 October 1947 in Dunston, Gateshead. He is the oldest of four siblings. His English father, Alan, was a coal miner and sergeant major in the British Army's Durham Light Infantry who died in 1996. His Italian mother, Esther (née De Luca), was from Frascati. When he was young, Johnson performed in various shows with the Scouts, appeared in a play which aired on television, and joined a local church choir. He served in the Territorial Army with the 17th Parachute Battalion in Germany for two years.

== Career ==
=== Early career ===
Johnson's first band was the Gobi Desert Canoe Club. He was also in a band called Fresh. From 1970, Johnson played with cabaret/club band the Jasper Hart Band, performing songs from the musical Hair as well as soft-rock/pop songs of the time. He and other members of the band formed Geordie.

Johnson released his first and only solo single, "I Can't Forget You Now", as a member of Geordie in January 1976 on the Red Bus label. In 1982, a compilation including ten of Geordie's 1973–1976 songs, was issued as Brian Johnson's solo album Strange Man on the MCA label. The U.S. 1989 CD Keep On Rocking, with re-recorded versions of the band's twelve known songs, was released under the name of Brian Johnson and Geordie as well as the Australian 1991 compilation CD Rockin' With The Boys 1972–1976.

=== AC/DC ===
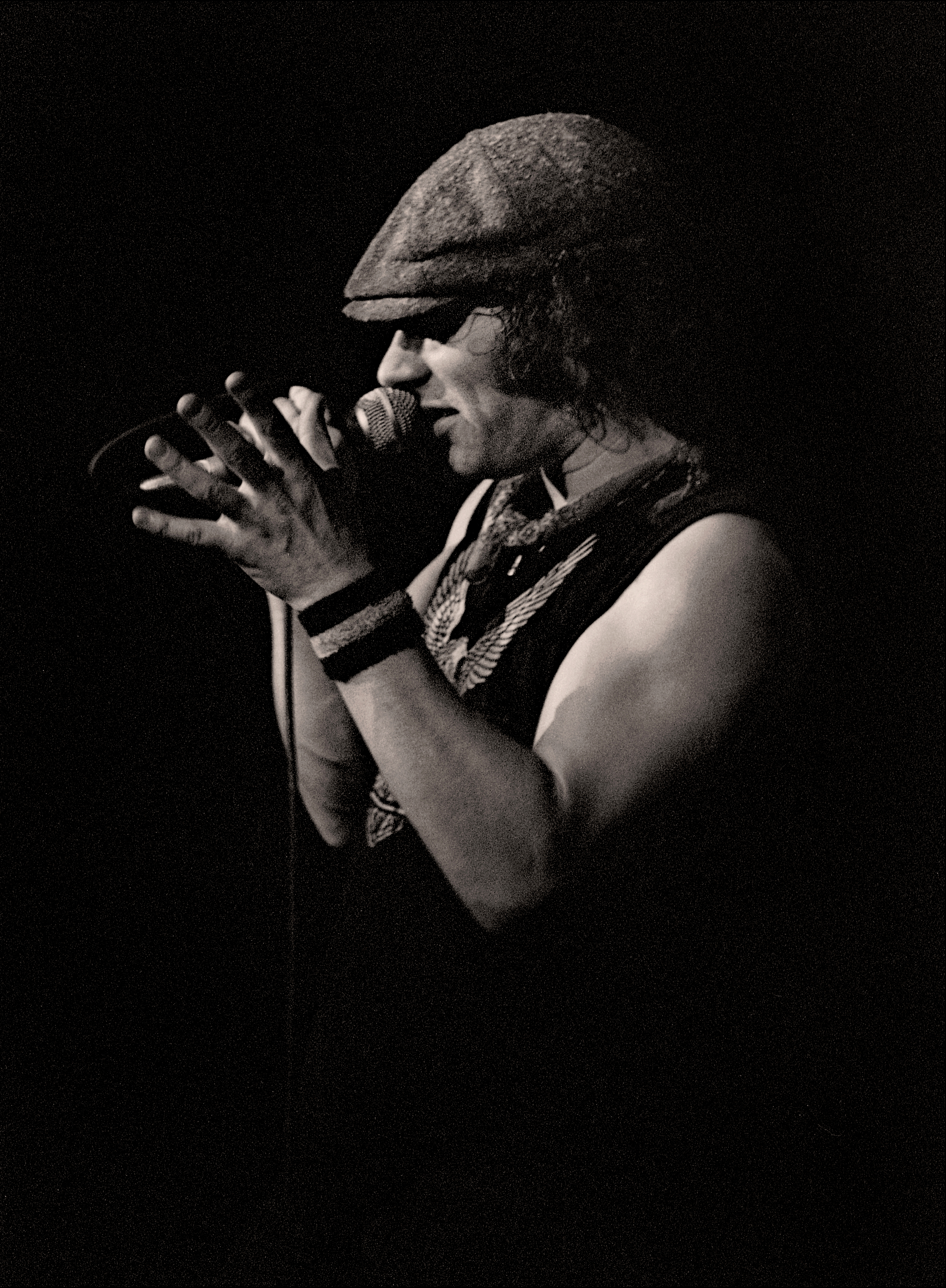
Johnson performing with AC/DC at the Manchester Apollo in 1982

Following Bon Scott's death, the remaining members of the band briefly considered disbanding, before concluding that Scott would have wanted AC/DC to continue. Various candidates were considered for his successor, including ex-Back Street Crawler vocalist Terry Slesser and Slade's Noddy Holder, who declined, before selecting Johnson. AC/DC guitarist and co-founder Angus Young later recalled, "I remember the first time I had ever heard Brian's name was from Bon".

"Bon had mentioned that he had been in England once touring with a band and he had mentioned that Brian had been in a band called Geordie and Bon had said 'Brian Johnson, he was a great rock and roll singer in the style of Little Richard.' And that was Bon's big idol, Little Richard. I think when he saw Brian at that time, to Bon it was 'Well he's a guy that knows what rock and roll is all about.' He mentioned that to us in Australia. I suppose when we decided to continue, Brian was the first name that Malcolm and myself came up with, so we said we should see if we can find him."

The band agreed immediately that Johnson's performing style fit AC/DC's music. In March 1980 Johnson received a phone call inviting him to London to audition as the new vocalist for AC/DC. As a big AC/DC fan, he was happy to oblige. Malcolm remembers the day: "We were all sitting there going, Where's this guy Brian? He should have been here an hour ago. 'Oh him? He's downstairs playing pool with the roadies' – so we thought, well, at least he plays pool."

When someone fetched him to meet them, Malcolm recalls that Johnson, "had tears in his eyes. He was as sad about Bon as we were. Anyway, we said, Do you want to give it a go? And he said, 'I do "Whole Lotta Rosie" with Geordie,' and off he went. We went, this guy is cutting the mustard. Anything else you know? "Nutbush City Limits"? OK, we can knock that out, and he sang that great too. It put a little smile on our faces – for the first time since Bon. So we just started working with him then."

Within days, Johnson was in the band, the news being made official on 1 April. A week after that he was sent a plane ticket to the Bahamas, their management's idea, partly for tax purposes and partly because there were no vacant studios in the UK, where he joined the Youngs, bassist Cliff Williams, drummer Phil Rudd and Highway to Hell producer Mutt Lange in Compass Point Studios.

The result was the album Back in Black, which was released in July that year. It was a worldwide success and went on to become the second-best-selling album of all time. In 1986, Johnson returned to Tyneside and appeared in the music video for "You Shook Me All Night Long", and the video received significant airplay on MTV.

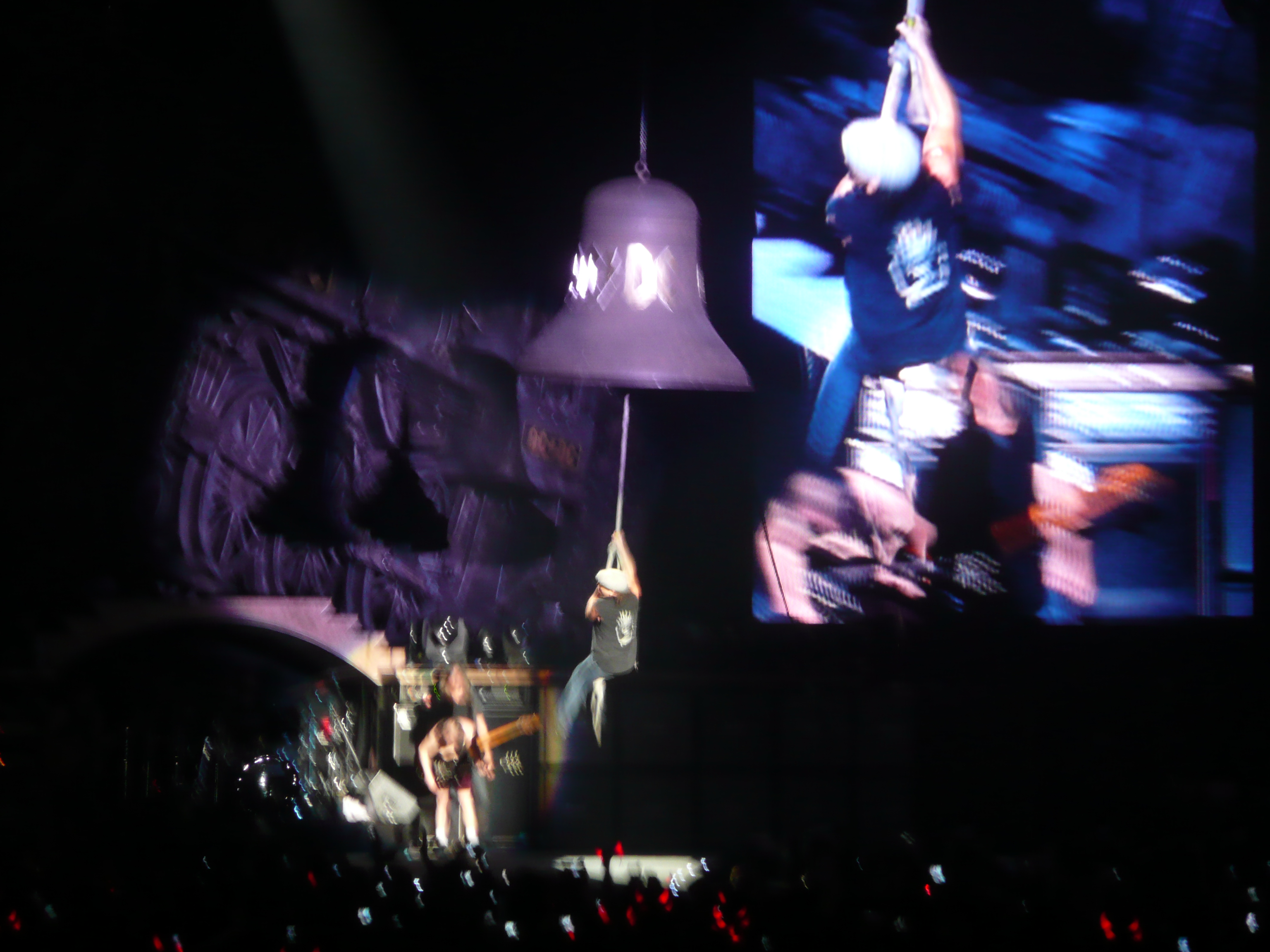
Johnson hangs on to a bell while performing the song "Hells Bells"

The 1988 album Blow Up Your Video was the last AC/DC album to feature lyrics from Johnson. Starting with The Razors Edge in 1990, guitarists Angus and Malcolm Young have written all of AC/DC's material. When asked by a fan during a radio interview why he stopped contributing lyrics, he laughed, "I ran out of words" and went on to explain that during recording he did not always enjoy the pressure of having to come up with an album's worth of lyrics and was relieved when the Young brothers filled in during The Razors Edge. The band has since continued in that tradition for every album since.

A symbol of the working class in the north of England, Johnson customarily wears a newsboy cap on stage and frequently off. Johnson has occasionally worn baseball caps as well. His brother suggested that the singer wear the cap onstage to prevent sweat rolling off his thick, curly hair into his eyes while singing. "He said, 'Put it on, at least you'll be able to see what the bloody freak you're doing!' So I put it on and after three songs in the second set, I looked at him, put my thumbs up – 'This is brilliant!' He never did get that hat back."

On 19 April 2010, AC/DC's Iron Man 2 compilation was released, featuring songs sung by both Johnson and Bon Scott, similar to the 1986 soundtrack compilation Who Made Who, for Stephen King's film Maximum Overdrive.

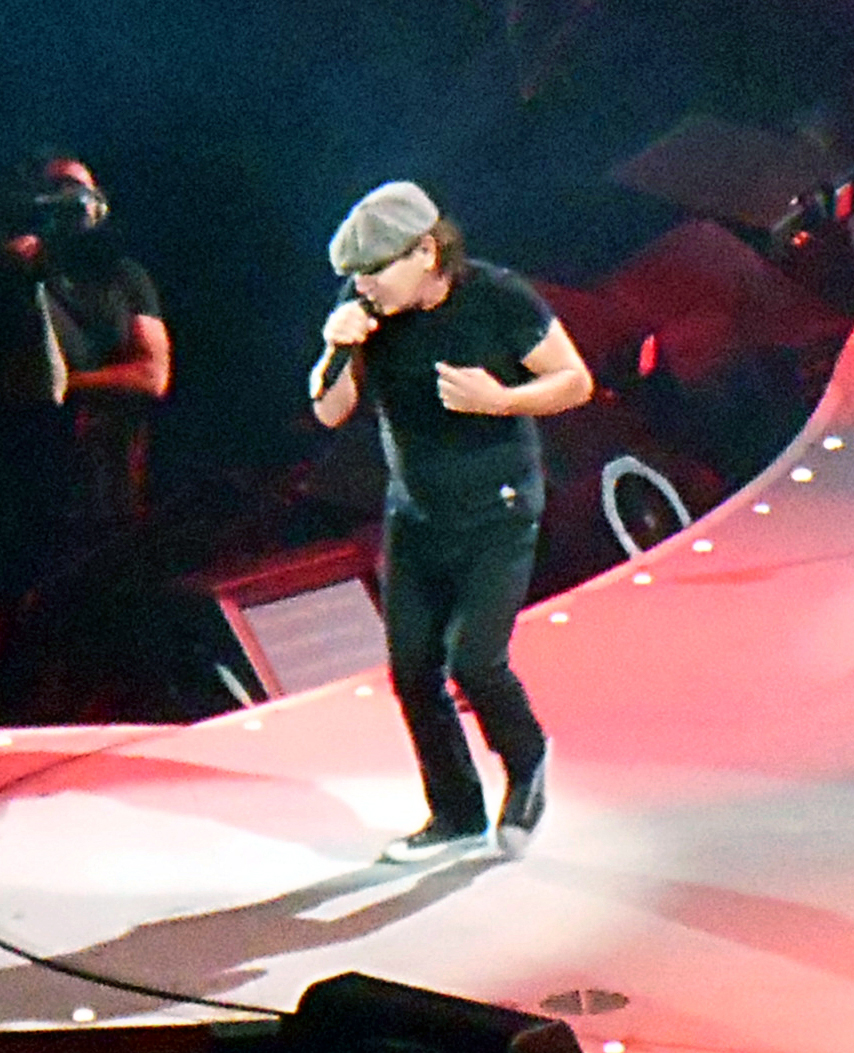
Johnson performing with AC/DC in Tacoma, Washington, 2 February 2016

In April 2016, during the Rock or Bust World Tour, AC/DC announced the departure of Johnson, citing hearing issues. As the band explained it, Johnson risked total hearing loss if he continued. Johnson stated that his hearing issues had not come from performing for 36 years with AC/DC, but from having forgotten to put ear plugs in during a race that left him with a punctured left ear drum. Guns N' Roses singer Axl Rose was recruited to complete the remaining ten shows in North America and twelve shows in Europe.

Johnson's last show with AC/DC was on 28 February 2016, at the Sprint Center in Kansas City, Missouri. He stated in an interview that he "had a pretty good run" in AC/DC and implied that he might not be returning. After departing AC/DC, he recorded a new song with comedian Jim Breuer called "Mr. Rock 'n' Roll". Johnson made a cameo appearance with rock band Muse on 31 August 2017, performing a rendition of "Back in Black" with the group.

In August 2018, rumours began circulating that Johnson and drummer Phil Rudd had rejoined AC/DC. According to members of the band Terrorizer, in January 2019 Johnson confirmed to them that he was back in AC/DC after getting "sick of denying it" and that he was working on a new album.

On 30 September 2020, AC/DC posted a photo on social media listing the band's new line-up, including Johnson on vocals, as well as a photo featuring, him, Angus, Cliff Williams, Phil Rudd and Stevie Young reunited.

In November 2020, AC/DC released a new album, Power Up, with Johnson on vocals.

On 7 October 2023, Johnson made a return to the stage with AC/DC at the Power Trip festival, the band's first show since 2016, when they concluded the Rock or Bust World Tour with Axl Rose as their singer. Johnson subsequently toured with the band on their Power Up Tour.

=== Helen of Troy musical ===
Since April 2003, Johnson, who says "I love musical theatre, especially the classic stuff, like Rodgers and Hammerstein", has been working on a musical version of Helen of Troy with Sarasota Ballet choreographer, Robert de Warren. The musical is a Les Misérables-style musical with rousing anthems, tender ballads and minimal dialogue. He conceived the project with writers Ian La Frenais, Dick Clement, and Brendan Healy after seeing Andrew Lloyd Webber's musical Cats and being underwhelmed at what he saw.

Malcolm McDowell, who made his recording debut singing one of the songs for the soundtrack in Brian's studio, agreed to play Zeus. The Cranberries singer Dolores O'Riordan and Bruce Vilanch were also set to participate. In 2004, Johnson travelled to Greece to film an episode of the television series Goddess Odyssey in which he researched the Helen of Troy myth. It was released on DVD in July 2005 and contains music from the theatre production. Phil Carson, former chief executive of Atlantic Records, supported the project but it was never staged.

=== Other activities ===
A car and racing enthusiast, Johnson currently enjoys racing his vintage race cars: a Royale RP-4 and a Pilbeam MP84, which he races in vintage and historic races throughout the United States. In 1997, Johnson recorded with the band Jackyl on their song "Locked and Loaded", and in 2002, wrote lyrics on the track "Kill the Sunshine" from their album Relentless. In the video game Call of Duty: Finest Hour, he voiced Sergeant Bob Starkey. He based his performance on his father. He made a cameo appearance in the 2005 film Goal! where he appears as a Newcastle United fan in a bar in California watching a Newcastle game.

In 2006, he took part in car racing reality television series The Race, broadcast on Sky One in the UK. In 2007, Johnson and AC/DC bassist Cliff Williams took part in the Classic Rock Cares tour to raise funds for the John Entwistle Foundation, which is run by Entwistle's long-time friend and drummer Steve Luongo. They performed AC/DC songs as well as songs written by Johnson for the film Totally Baked.

On 26 July 2009, Johnson appeared as the Star in a Reasonably Priced Car on the BBC's Top Gear. His time of 1:45.9 tied him with Britain's Got Talent judge Simon Cowell and Grand Designs host Kevin McCloud for the second-fastest time in the Chevrolet Lacetti, just 0.1 seconds behind Jay Kay. Johnson subsequently appeared in the premiere of Top Gear series 20 and was the first star to record a time in their new Vauxhall Astra test vehicle, recording a time of 1:45.1. In April 2015, Johnson stated it was a mistake for the BBC to sack Jeremy Clarkson after the Top Gear presenter punched a colleague: "I know Jeremy and I know the lads [Richard Hammond and James May] and it's [the punch] just totally out of character."

His autobiography Rockers and Rollers was published in 2000. He raced in the 2012 Rolex 24 at Daytona on 29 and 30 January 2012. He finished 12th in the Daytona Prototype class, driving for 50+Predator/Alegra Racing, sharing the No. 50 RileyTech/BMW Daytona Prototype with Elliott Forbes-Robinson, Byron DeFoor, Jim Pace, and Carlos de Quesada. He competed in the 2012 Silverstone Classic Celebrity Challenge race. In 2013, Johnson appeared as a guest singer on two songs on Sting's album The Last Ship which features artists with roots in the northeast of England.

In May 2014, Quest broadcast Cars That Rock with Brian Johnson, a documentary series fronted by Johnson where he explores his favourite iconic motor cars. The first episode looks at the history of the Mini, with Johnson driving a big selection of the cars, including the car from the 1969 British caper film The Italian Job and the world's fastest Mini. It concludes with Johnson racing a Mini Cooper at Brands Hatch, and finishes with him stating he has bought the car he raced. As of 2016, the show can now be seen on the Velocity channel.

In April 2017, Sky Arts broadcast the first episode of Brian Johnson: A Life on the Road. Series 1 comprised six episodes, with Johnson meeting contemporaries in the music industry to talk about their musical upbringings and careers. Featured were Roger Daltrey (The Who), Lars Ulrich (Metallica), Nick Mason (Pink Floyd), Sting (The Police), Joe Elliott (Def Leppard), and Robert Plant (Led Zeppelin). Series 2 was released in 2019 featuring Dolly Parton, Billy Joel, Mark Knopfler (Dire Straits), Mick Fleetwood (Fleetwood Mac), Joe Walsh (James Gang, The Eagles), and Paul Rodgers (Free, Bad Company).

On 3 September 2022, Johnson took to the stage at the Taylor Hawkins Tribute Concert and performed "Back in Black" and "Let There Be Rock" with Metallica drummer Lars Ulrich and the Foo Fighters. Johnson's memoirs, entitled The Lives of Brian, was published by HarperCollins and released on 25 October 2022.

== Personal life ==
Johnson married his first wife, Carol, in 1968, and they have two daughters. They first separated in the late 1970s and ultimately divorced during the writing of The Razors Edge album. He later married Brenda Winkel on 14 April 1990, and lives in Sarasota, Florida.

He is an avid supporter of Newcastle United and was asked to invest in the club in the early 1980s after being invited to meet the board by club legend Jackie Milburn.

In September 2009, Johnson was diagnosed with Barrett's oesophagus, causing AC/DC to cancel several shows on their 2010 tour in support of Black Ice. However, doctors were able to prevent the disease from developing into cancer.

According to the Sunday Times Rich List of British millionaires in music, Johnson was worth £65 million in 2016.

On 9 July 2014, Johnson was awarded an honorary degree of Doctor of Music by Northumbria University in recognition of his significant contribution to the music industry. In October 2014, he became a supporter of the Yorkshire Dementia Charity based in the village of Topcliffe.

== Discography ==
With Geordie

Title	Release date	Label
Hope You Like It	1973	EMI
Don't Be Fooled by the Name	1974	EMI
Save the World	1976	EMI
No Good Woman	1978	EMI

With AC/DC

Title	Release date	Label	U.S. Album Sales	"Worldwide sales"
Back in Black	July 1980	Atlantic	27,000,000	50,000,000
For Those About to Rock	November 1981	Atlantic	4,000,000	7,000,000
Flick of the Switch	September 1983	Atlantic	1,000,000	4,000,000
Fly on the Wall	June 1985	Atlantic	1,000,000	4,200,000
Who Made Who	May 1986	Atlantic	5,000,000	10,000,000
Blow Up Your Video	January 1988	Atlantic	2,000,000	4,000,000
The Razors Edge	September 1990	Atco	5,000,000	12,000,000
Live	October 1992	Atco	5,000,000	8,000,000
Ballbreaker	September 1995	Elektra	2,000,000	6,000,000
Stiff Upper Lip	February 2000	Elektra	1,000,000	4,000,000
Black Ice	October 2008	Columbia	2,500,000	8,000,000
Rock or Bust	November 2014	Columbia	500,000	2,800,000
Power Up	November 2020	Columbia	TBA	1,400,000

Solo

Title	Release date
National Lampoon's Totally Baked: A Potumentary soundtrack	April 2007

== Motorsports career ==
=== 24 Hours of Daytona results ===
Year	Team	Co-drivers	Car	Class	Laps	Pos.	Class Pos.
2012	(United States) 50+ Predator	(United States) Byron DeFoor (United States) Elliott Forbes-Robinson (United States) Jim Pace (United States) Carlos de Quesada	Riley Mk. XI	DP	672	32nd	12th

== Publications ==
- Rockers and Rollers: An Automotive Autobiography. Simon & Schuster Australia. 2009. ISBN 9780731814381.
- The Lives of Brian: A Memoir. Dey Street Books. 2022. ISBN 9780063046382.
