= Bandit (band) =

English rock band (1976–1979)

- Bandit in 1976. From left to right: Jim Diamond, Cliff Williams, Graham Broad, James Litherland, and Danny McIntosh.

Background information
- Origin: United Kingdom
- Genres: Rock; hard rock; pop rock
- Years active: 1976–1979
- Labels: Arista; Ariola
- Past members: Danny McIntosh; Jim Diamond; Cliff Williams; James Litherland; Graham Broad; Gerry Trew; Theodore Thunder; Tony Lester; Mick Grabham

Bandit were an English rock band, formed in 1976 and disbanded in 1979. They are not to be confused with the same Bandit from the US who released their only album in 1975 on ABC Records.

== Background ==
Bandit's eponymous debut studio album, released in 1976.

Bandit released two albums with different line-ups. Bandit's debut Bandit was released in late 1976 on Arista Records. This album featured Jim Diamond on lead vocals, Danny McIntosh on guitar, future AC/DC bassist Cliff Williams, James Litherland on guitar and harmonica, and drummer Graham Broad, later of Roger Waters' band. All except Williams wrote, though Diamond wrote about half the material. A single entitled "Ohio" (written by Diamond) was released from the album, but failed to chart. The punk rock music scene of the time caused a lack of attention and the band later parted ways. Diamond went on to join PhD, who gained a UK Top 10 hit with "I Won't Let You Down". He later went solo and scored two more top ten hits.

The band continued, undergoing an almost total overhaul, with only guitarist McIntosh remaining. New recruits were Gerry Trew on lead vocals, drummer Theodore Thunder (real name John Dentith), and bassist Tony Lester. Lester now wrote the bulk of the band's material.

The second album, Partners in Crime, was produced by Matthew Fisher of Procol Harum and released by Ariola Records in 1978. "One Way Love", a single from the album (penned by Lester) reached No. 76 on the American Billboard chart.

A third album was recorded and featured guitarist Mick Grabham of Procol Harum (replacing McIntosh) but was never released and finally the band broke up. A five-song EP from the unreleased album was released in 2016 entitled Bandit3 EP. The band's final tour was with John Miles in 1979 with the lineup Trew, Lester, Grabham and Thunder.

Both full-length Bandit albums are long out of print. McIntosh is now the guitarist for, and husband of, the singer-songwriter Kate Bush.
