= Power Trip (music festival) =

Heavy metal music festival

- Genre: Hard rock; heavy metal
- Dates: October 6–8, 2023
- Locations: Empire Polo Club, Indio
- Organizer: Goldenvoice
- Website: powertrip.live

Power Trip was a heavy metal music festival held at Empire Polo Club in Indio, California. The festival was held from October 6 to 8, 2023. It featured Metallica, Iron Maiden, Guns N' Roses, Tool, AC/DC, and Judas Priest. Ozzy Osbourne was scheduled to perform on October 7, but canceled his appearance due to health issues. The festival was described as the "sequel to Desert Trip".

== Lineup ==
List of bands co-headlining Power Trip, showing date, and co-headliner
Date (2023)	Co-Headliner
Friday, October 6	Iron Maiden; Guns N' Roses
Saturday, October 7	~~Ozzy Osbourne~~; Judas Priest; AC/DC
Sunday, October 8	Tool; Metallica

== Set lists ==
Iron Maiden – October 6, 2023
1. "Caught Somewhere in Time"
2. "Stranger in a Strange Land"
3. "The Writing on the Wall"
4. "Days of Future Past"
5. "The Time Machine"
6. "The Prisoner"
7. "Death of the Celts"
8. "Can I Play With Madness"
9. "Heaven Can Wait"
10. "Alexander the Great"
11. "Fear of the Dark"
12. "Iron Maiden"
  Encore
13. "Hell on Earth"
14. "The Trooper"
15. "Wasted Years"
Guns N' Roses – October 6, 2023
1. "It's So Easy"
2. "Bad Obsession"
3. "Chinese Democracy"
4. "Slither"
5. "Pretty Tied Up"
6. "Mr. Brownstone"
7. "Welcome to the Jungle"
8. "Hard Skool"
9. "Absurd"
10. "Double Talkin' Jive"
11. "Reckless Life"
12. "You Could Be Mine"
13. "Estranged"
14. "Live and Let Die"
15. "Down on the Farm"
16. "Rocket Queen"
17. "T.V. Eye"
18. "Better"
19. "Anything Goes"
20. "Civil War"
21. "Guitar Solo"
22. "Sweet Child o' Mine"
23. "November Rain"
24. "Wichita Lineman"
25. "Knockin' on Heaven's Door"
26. "Patience"
27. "Coma"
28. "Nightrain"
29. "Paradise City"
Judas Priest – October 7, 2023
1. "Electric Eye"
2. "Riding on the Wind"
3. "Heading Out to the Highway"
4. "Lightning Strike"
5. "Diamonds & Rust"
6. "The Sentinel"
7. "A Touch of Evil"
8. "Turbo Lover"
9. "Firepower"
10. "Desert Plains"
11. "Rapid Fire"
12. "The Green Manalishi (With the Two Prong Crown)"
13. "You've Got Another Thing Comin'"
14. "Painkiller"
  Encore
15. "Hell Bent for Leather"
16. "Metal Gods"
17. "Breaking the Law"
18. "Living After Midnight"
AC/DC – October 7, 2023
1. "If You Want Blood (You've Got It)"
2. "Back in Black"
3. "Demon Fire"
4. "Shot Down in Flames"
5. "Thunderstruck"
6. "Have a Drink on Me"
7. "Hells Bells"
8. "Shot in the Dark"
9. "Stiff Upper Lip"
10. "Dirty Deeds Done Dirt Cheap"
11. "Shoot to Thrill"
12. "Sin City"
13. "Givin the Dog a Bone"
14. "Rock 'n' Roll Train"
15. "You Shook Me All Night Long"
16. "Dog Eat Dog"
17. "High Voltage"
18. "Hell Ain't a Bad Place to Be"
19. "Riff Raff"
20. "Highway to Hell"
21. "Whole Lotta Rosie"
22. "Let There Be Rock"
  Encore
23. "T.N.T."
24. "For Those About to Rock (We Salute You)"
Tool – October 8, 2023
1. "Jambi"
2. "The Pot"
3. "Fear Inoculum"
4. "Rosetta Stoned"
5. "Pushit"
6. "Forty Six & 2"
7. "Pneuma"
8. "The Grudge"
9. "Invincible"
10. "Stinkfist"
11. "Swamp Song"
12. "Ænema"
Metallica – October 8, 2023
1. "Whiplash"
2. "Creeping Death"
3. "For Whom the Bell Tolls"
4. "Enter Sandman"
5. "Lux Æterna"
6. "Too Far Gone?"
7. "Fade to Black"
8. "Fuel"
9. "Orion"
10. "Nothing Else Matters"
11. "Sad but True"
12. "The Day That Never Comes"
13. "Hardwired"
14. "Seek & Destroy"
15. "One"
16. "Master of Puppets"
