= Terry Wilson (musician) =

- Born: Robert Terry Wilson; October 4, 1949 (age 76); Warren, Arkansas, U.S.
- Origin: Deer Park, Texas
- Genres: Rock, blues, country
- Occupations: Musician, producer, composer
- Instrument: Bass guitar

Robert Terry Wilson (born October 4, 1949) is an American bass player, record producer, and composer.

== Career ==
Wilson was born in Warren south of Pine Bluff, Arkansas. In the late 1960s, he started as a professional musician, playing bass for bands and artists including Blackwell, Bloontz, and John Martyn amongst others. In 1975, he became a member of the rock band Back Street Crawler. Around that time he also worked with Johnny Nash, John Bundrick, Speedy Keen, Paul Travis, Shusha Guppy, Sue Glover, Paul Kossoff, Eddie Quansah, No Slack, Mark Ashton, Geoff Whitehorn, and others.

In 1981–1982, he played bass for Eric Burdon on the album Comeback and on live shows, as well as the Rockpalast concert. He was also credited on many later released compilations of Burdon and as the composer of The Animals's 1983 reggae/rock-single, "Love is for all Time" (which was performed during the live shows of his wife, Teresa James).

Throughout the 1980s and the 1990s, he worked with Gary Dayton Hill, Johnny Nash, Darling Cruel, Kimm Rogers, Alejandro Escovedo, Stephen Bruton, Little Whisper, Maria Muldaur, Storyville, Tamara Champlin, Bill Champlin, Juice Newton, Mark Sebastian, Big Trouble and others. After 2000, he also worked, toured and/or wrote for or is credited on records by Gary Dayton Hill, Kathy Mattea, Chuck E. Weiss, Jack's Mannequin, Ana Popović, Dallas Hodge, JD & the Straight Shot, his wife Teresa James and Eric Burdon for which he has been a permanent band member since 2009.

In 1980, he had a small role in the movie UFOria, starring Fred Ward and Harry Dean Stanton.

== Discography ==
- Blackwell: Blackwell (Atco Records, 1969)
- Bloontz: Bloontz (Evolution Records, 1972)
- Johnny Nash: Celebrate Life (CBS Records, 1974)
- John "Rabbit" Bundrick Dark Saloon (Island Records, 1974)
- Speedy Keen Y Know Wot I Mean? (Island Records, 1975)
- Shusha Guppy Before the Deluge (1975)
- Paul Travis Return of the Native (1974)
- John Martyn Sunday's Child (Island Records, 1975)
- Eddie Quansah Che Che Cuelee (1975)
- Back Street Crawler The Band Plays On (Atlantic Records, 1975)
- Back Street Crawler 2nd Street (Atlantic Records, 1976)
- Crawler Crawler (CBS Records, 1977)
- Crawler Snake, Rattle & Roll (CBS Records, 1978)
- Blaze Foley "If I Could Only Fly" (producer, Zephyr Records, 1979)
- Eric Burdon "Comeback" / "Crawling King Snake"
- Stephen Bruton What It Is (Dos Records, 1993)
- Stephen Bruton Right on Time (Dos Records, 1995)
- Paul Kossoff Blue Soul (1986)
- Teresa James The Whole Enchilada (2003)
- Alejandro Escovedo Gravity (1992)
- Alejandro Escovedo Thirteen Years (1994)
- Storyville Bluest Eyes (1993)
- Teresa James Oh Yeah! (Black & Tan Records 2003)
- Teresa James & the Rhythm Tramps The Rhythm Method (Jesilu Records, 2005)
- Teresa James & the Rhythm Tramps The Bottom Line (New Light Ent. Records, 2007)
- Jodie Siegal "Stepping Stone" (2007 Produced)
- Cynthia Jones And West Coast Highlights (Produced 2008)
- Danny Everitt Cold Wind Cold Rain (Produced 2007)
- Eric Burdon My Secret Life (2004)
- Eric Burdon Soul of a Man (2006)
- Ana Popović Still Making History (Delta Groove Productions, 2007)
- Eric Burdon 'Til Your River Runs Dry (2013)
- Teresa James & the Rhythm Tramps Live! (2019)
