= Memorial (Russian Circles album) =

Studio album by Russian Circles
- Released: October 29, 2013
- Recorded: May 2013; Electrical Audio studios (Chicago, Illinois)
- Genre: Post-rock
- Length: 36:59
- Label: Sargent House
- Producer: Brandon Curtis

Russian Circles chronology
Empros (2011)	Memorial (2013)	Guidance (2016)

Memorial is the fifth studio album by American post-metal band Russian Circles. The album was released on October 29, 2013 through Sargent House. Memorial was produced by Brandon Curtis (Secret Machines, Interpol), who also produced the band's two previous albums, Empros (2011) and Geneva (2009).

Prior to the release of Memorial, Russian Circles released online streams of "Deficit" in August 2013, "Memorial" in September 2013 and "1777" in October 2013 to promote the album. Russian Circles' first tour in support of Memorial was a late-2013 European tour with Chelsea Wolfe.

== Background and composition ==
Bassist Brian Cook said that Memorial is more "polarizing" between heavy and soft parts than previous efforts, and that the "heavy parts are much more blown out and exaggerated while the pretty moments are far more restrained, delicate, and atmospheric." Cook also described the album as being darker and more somber than previous efforts. Inspired by Pink Floyd's 1977 album Animals, Memorial's album structure features the similarly composed intro/outro songs "Memoriam" and "Memorial" to make the album start and end in the same place.

== Critical reception ==
Professional ratings
Aggregate scores
Source	Rating
Metacritic	88/100
Review scores
Source	Rating
The 405	8/10
AbsolutePunk	8.5/10
AllMusic	4.5/5 stars
Exclaim!	8/10
The Guardian	4/5 stars
The Line of Best Fit	6.5/10
Metal Hammer	4/5 stars
Pitchfork	7.8/10
PopMatters	10/10
The Skinny	4/5 stars

Memorial received critical acclaim upon its release. At Metacritic, which assigns a normalized rating out of 100 to reviews from mainstream critics, the album has received an average score of 88, based on 8 reviews, indicating "universal acclaim". Writing for AllMusic, Gregory Heaney praised the album, stating that Memorial was "one of the band's strongest works to date", giving it four-and-half-stars out of five. Brice Ezell of PopMatters rated the album ten out of ten and called it "one of 2013’s true artistic masterpieces". Dom Lawson from The Guardian was also positive, writing that "Right now, few bands conjure such vital and nourishing food for the imagination." Exclaim!'s Farah Barakat wrote, "There's no questioning, however, the intricate craftsmanship that makes Memorial a memorable release in Russian Circles' ever-expanding discography." Brandon Stosuy of Pitchfork praised the band's ability to create interesting music with such a sparse, largely vocal-devoid lineup.

Memorial appeared on several publications' year-end lists.

=== Accolades ===
Year	Publication	Country	Accolade	Rank
2013	Obscure Sound	United States	"Best Albums of 2013"	28
2013	PopMatters	United States	"The 75 Best Albums of 2013"	54
2013	PopMatters	United States	"The Best Metal Albums of 2013"	12
2013	Pitchfork	United States	"The Top 40 Metal Albums of 2013"	13

== Track listing ==
All music written by Russian Circles.

No.	Title	Length
1.	"Memoriam"	1:28
2.	"Deficit"	6:41
3.	"1777"	7:20
4.	"Cheyenne"	4:24
5.	"Burial"	4:43
6.	"Ethel"	4:02
7.	"Lebaron"	4:36
8.	"Memorial (feat. Chelsea Wolfe)"	3:45
Total length:		36:59

== Personnel ==
Memorial personnel adapted from CD liner notes.

Russian Circles

- Brian Cook
- Mike Sullivan
- Dave Turncrantz

Additional musicians

- Jill Kaeding – cello
- Greg Norman – trombone
- Susan Voelz – violin
- Chelsea Wolfe – vocals on "Memorial"

Recording and production

- Brandon Curtis – production
- Joe Lambert – mastering
- Greg Norman – engineering
- Russian Circles – production

Artwork and design

- David Knudson – design
- Ryan Russell – photographs

== Chart positions ==
Chart (2013)	Peak position
US Billboard 200	136
US Top Hard Rock Albums (Billboard)	14
US Heatseekers Albums (Billboard)	3
US Independent Albums (Billboard)	24
US Top Rock Albums (Billboard)	38
US Indie Store Album Sales (Billboard)	17
US Vinyl Albums (Billboard)	4
