= Tony Braunagel =

American drummer

- Born: Anthony Braunagel; Texas, U.S.
- Genres: Blues rock, reggae, rhythm and blues
- Occupations: Musician, songwriter, record producer
- Instruments: Drums, Percussion
- Years active: 1960s–present

Tony Braunagel is an American drummer, producer, and songwriter from Houston, Texas, United States, who is based in Los Angeles, California. Braunagel has played on many film scores and television shows as well as numerous albums as a musician, composer and producer. He is best known as a session drummer and/or percussionist of over 200 albums including those of Otis Rush, Eric Burdon, Johnny Nash, Coco Montoya, Lucky Peterson, as well as Grammy winning albums of Bonnie Raitt, Taj Mahal, Buddy Guy (percussion) and for performing live with dozens of music icons including Bonnie Raitt, Rickie Lee Jones, BB King, Lightnin’ Hopkins, John Lee Hooker, Robert Cray, Bette Midler, Lyle Lovett, and Taj Mahal.

Braunagel's recording and performing career encompasses numerous and diverse rhythms and drum styles, but he is most known for Rhythm and Blues, Blues, Americana Rock ‘n’ Roll, Blues shuffle, Back Beat, as well as his own blend of Reggae and West African rhythms.

Several of the albums produced by Braunagel have been nominated for and won Grammy and Blues Music Awards, reached Billboard charts, Living Blues charts, Roots & Music reports, and many Blues blog charts around the world, including albums by artists such as Taj Mahal, Eric Burdon, Coco Montoya, Danielle Nicole, Phantom Blues Band, and Curtis Salgado.

== Early life ==
Anthony Michael Braunagel grew up in Houston, Texas, United States. His father was a country music fan, played some guitar, and surrounded him with music. Braunagel's first experience on the drums was playing his cousin's drumkit as a child, before being mentored by his neighbor (now life-long friend) Willie Ornelas.

At the age of 15 he bought his first drumkit from Ornelas and performed live for the first time shortly thereafter when Ornelas got him his first nightclub gig. Soon after, he became involved in the then-upcoming Houston R&B scene, honing his skills by playing in local joints and nightclubs.

== Performance career ==
Braunagel's early drumming career included playing in several local bands, such as Soul Brothers Incorporated, The Jokers, and Buttermilk Bottom. The latter got a record deal with Polydor and released a single. After the demise of Buttermilk Bottom, he then teamed up with Andy Chapman (vocals), Jimmy Don Smith (guitar) and then David Kealey (guitar), Michael Montgomery (keyboards), and Terry Wilson (bass) to form The Bloontz All Star Blues Band. In 1971, the band moved to New York under the auspices of producer Ron Johnsen, shortening their name to Bloontz and scoring a contract with the Evolution label.

Bloontz recorded one album at Electric Lady Studios, after which in 1973 Braunagel and Wilson toured with Johnny Nash becoming part of his latest Sons of the Jungle line up.

Braunagel wrote a song for Johnny Nash's Celebrate Life album in 1974 called "Standing in the Rain". Soon after, Braunagel with his battery mate, bassist Wilson, accepted an offer from Island Records to move to London in order to work with John "Rabbit" Bundrick, and several other Island artists. While in London, he was the house band drummer for Island Records as the Texas Rhythm Section along with Wilson on bass.

While in London, he met ex-Free guitarist Paul Kossoff and, together with Wilson and Montgomery from his former band, Bloontz, they formed Back Street Crawler. The band also included Terry Wilson-Slesser on vocals and later John "Rabbit" Bundrick, who replaced Montgomery on keyboards following the release of the band's first album The Band Plays On (Atco Records). They recorded a further album 2nd Street prior to Kossoff's death in 1976 after which the band decided to stay together. They added Geoff Whitehorn on guitar, and shortened its name to Crawler. This incarnation of the band moved to Epic Records, recorded two more albums, and embarked on several America tours, sometimes supporting stadium acts such as Kansas and Foreigner, Rush, and Robin Trower.

In 1979, Braunagel relocated to Los Angeles where he found work touring and recording with artists such as Eric Burdon, Rickie Lee Jones and Bette Midler. In 1984, Braunagel took the drum stool in Bonnie Raitt's band, playing on the albums Nick of Time and Luck of the Draw, and touring with her until the early 1990s. He also spent several years touring with Taj Mahal and The Phantom Blues Band.

Braunagel's live performance career included work with such artists as Ivan Neville, Etta James, Eric Burdon, Robert Cray, Bonnie Raitt, B.B. King, John Lee Hooker, Jimmie Reed, Rickie Lee Jones, Bette Midler, Buddy Guy, Coco Montoya, Curtis Salgado, Lyle Lovett, Taj Mahal, Lightnin’ Hopkins, Jack Mack and the Heart Attack, Crawler, Back Street Crawler, Clover, Paul Kossoff, Andy Fraser, Tommy Dardar, Katey Sagal, Charles Brown, Koko Taylor, Billy Vera (Billy and the Beaters), John Cleary, Mike Zito, Billy Thompson, Phantom Blues Band, Leo Nocentelli, George Porter Jr., Roy Gaines, Chris Cain, and BW Stephenson. He also performed Blues Foundation and House of Blues house band shows with guests such as Dr. John, Little Milton, Rufus Thomas, Otis Clay, and Carla Thomas.

In addition to playing drums and producing music, Braunagel is also a songwriter. He is a Blues Music Award winner. He has been nominated for Blues Music Award in the 'Best Instrumentalist – Drums' category twelve times winning in 2018 Braunagel's recording credits include film scores and television shows as well as numerous albums as a musician, songwriter and producer. In the mid-1990s, Braunagel also produced several commercial jingles. In 2017, Braunagel appears on MEG Records/Nashville artist Tom Maclear's Gods and Ghosts.

== Music production and music awards ==
Throughout the 1990s, Braunagel played on many award-winning albums. Braunagel has also produced over 20 artists in connection with more than 40 albums. Sessions include drumming on two Grammy Award-winning albums by Taj Mahal and The Phantom Blues Band – Señor Blues and Shoutin' in Key,(Grammy winner, BMA winner) the latter of which Braunagel produced. His recordings with Taj Mahal and the Phantom Blues Band also won the 2001 W.C. Handy award for Band of the Year. Braunagel also recorded on Buddy Guy's Feels Like Rain (Grammy, Best Contemporary Blues Album, 1994), Bonnie Raitt's Nick of Time (Grammy, Album of the Year, 1989), Bonnie Raitt's Luck of the Draw (Grammy, Album of the Year, 1991), and on Trampled Under Foot's Badlands (BMA Contemporary Blues Album of the Year, 2014) which he also produced.

In addition, Braunagel produced and performed on Hard Truth and Coming in Hot with Coco Montoya; My Secret Life, 'Til Your River Runs Dry, Soul of a Man with Eric Burdon; Karen Lovely's 2015 album, Ten Miles of Bad Road. (BMA Nominee, Blues411 "Jimi" Award winner), and Cry No More (Grammy nominee) with Danielle Nicole. In 2019 Braunagel produced Nick Schnebelen's album, Crazy All By Myself. He also co-produced and performed on Curtis Salgado's albums Clean Getaway (BMA nominee), Soul Shot (BMA winner), and The Beautiful Lowdown (BMA winner),

== Discography ==
Performance - Drums & Percussion
Artist	Album title	Label	Year
Bloontz	Bloontz	Evolution	1973
Lyn Christopher	Lyn Christopher	Paramount Records	1973
Rabbit	Dark Saloon	Island Records	1974
Johnny Nash	Celebrate Life	CBS	1974
Back Street Crawler	The Band Plays On	Atlantic	1975
John Martyn	Sunday's Child	Island Records	1975
Speedy Keen	Y'Know Wot I Mean?	Island Records	1975
Shusha	Before The Deluge	United Artists Records	1975
Back Street Crawler	The Band Plays On (EP)	Atco Records	1975
Back Street Crawler	2nd Street	Atco Records	1976
Paul Travis	Return Of The Native	A&M Records	1976
Clover	Love On The Wire	Vertigo	1977
Paul Kossoff	Koss	DJM Records	1977
Crawler	Crawler	Epic	1977
Robert Campbell	Living in the Shadow of a Downtown Movie Show	Decca	1977
City Boy	Young Men Gone West	Vertigo	1977
Eddie Quansah	Che Che Kule	Island Records	1977
Crawler	Snake, Rattle And Roll	Epic	1978
Crawler	In Concert-185	BBC Transcription Services	1978
Mark Ashton	Solo	Ariola	1979
Brooklyn Dreams	Won't Let Go	Casablanca	1980
Che Blammo	"Rock Moderne"	Permanent Records	1981
Paul Kossoff	The Hunter	Street Tunes	1981
Chas Sandford	Parallax View	Elektra	1982
Eric Burdon Band	Eric Burdon Band	Line Records	1982
Teresa Straley	Never Enough	Alfa	1982
Paul Kossoff	Leaves In The Wind	Street Tunes	1982
Rickie Lee Jones	Girl At Her Volcano	Warner Bros. Records	1983
Paul Kossoff	Croydon June 15, 1975	Street Tunes	1983
Alex Call	Alex Call	Arista	1983
Eric Burdon	Power Company	Teldec	1983
Andy Fraser	Fine Fine Line	Island Records, Island Records	1984
Sam Harris	Sam Harris	Motown	1984
Jimmy Barnes	For The Working Class Man	Mushroom	1985
Jimmy Barnes	Jimmy Barnes	Geffen Records	1985
Paul Kossoff	Paul Kossoff	Victoria, Victoria	1985
Paul Kossoff	Blue Soul	Island Records	1986
Marc Jordan	Talking Through Pictures	RCA	1987
The Bonedaddys	A-koo-de-a!	Chameleon Records	1988
Marlo Thomas & Various	Free To Be... A Family	A&M Records	1988
Eric Burdon	Wicked Man	GNP Crescendo	1988
Bonnie Raitt	Nick of Time	Capitol Records	1989
C.P. Love	Stubborn Girl	Orleans Records	1990
Bonnie Raitt	Red Headed Woman	Real Live	1991
Bonnie Raitt	Luck Of The Draw	Capitol Records	1991
Eric Burdon	The Unreleased Eric Burdon	Blue Wave	1992
Taj Mahal	Dancing The Blues	Private Music	1993
Buddy Guy	Feels Like Rain	Silvertone Records	1993
Ian McNabb	Head Like A Rock	This Way Up	1994
Maria Muldaur	Meet Me At Midnite	Black Top Records	1994
Chris Thomas	21st Century Blues... From Da 'Hood	Private Music, BMG	1994
Otis Rush	Ain't Enough Comin' In	This Way Up	1994
Ian McNabb	Go Into The Light	This Way Up	1994
Ian McNabb	Head Like A Rock	This Way Up	1994
Otis Rush	Homework	This Way Up, Quicksilver Recording Company Ltd.	1994
Drivin' N' Cryin'	Wrapped In Sky	Geffen Records	1995
Thomas Anders	Souled	Polydor	1995
Eric Burdon	Rare Masters	SPV Recordings	1995
Taj Mahal	Phantom Blues	Private Music	1996
Jimmy Barnes	Hits (Anthology)	Mushroom	1996
Eric Burdon	Rare Masters Vol. 2	SPV Recordings	1996
Taj Mahal	Señor Blues	Private Music	1997
Alexis Peña	Alexis	Columbia	1997
John Mayall And The Bluesbreakers	Blues For The Lost Days	Silvertone Records	1997
Taj Mahal and the Phantom Blues Band	Tibetan Freedom Concert	Capitol Records	1997
Cinnamon	The Courier	Island Records	1997
B.B. King	Deuces Wild	MCA Records	1997
Bonnie Raitt	Fundamental	Capitol Records, Highway One Media Entertainment, Tower Records	1998
City Boy	Young Men Gone West / Book Early	Renaissance Records	1998
Eric Burdon	F#¢k Me!!! I Thought He Was Dead	TKO Magnum Music	1998
Eric Burdon	Nightwinds Dying	Institute of Art Records, Rough Trade	1998
The Pearsons	One By One	Shadow Mountain	1998
Teresa James	The Whole Enchilada	Jesilu Records	1998
Maria Muldaur	Meet Me Where They Play The Blues	Telarc	1999
Buddy Guy - Buddy's Baddest: The Best Of Buddy Guy	Feels Like Rain	Silvertone Records	1999
Crawler	Concert Classics - Volume 10	Renaissance Records,	1999
Crawler	Concert Classics - Volume 10	Concert Classics	1999
Cal Hollow	Two Bulb Twilight	Jericho	1999
B.B. King	Makin' Love Is Good For You	MCA Records	2000
Taj Mahal & The Phantom Blues Band	Shoutin' In Key (Live)	Hannibal Records, Kan-Du Records	2000
Taj Mahal	Best Of The Private Years	Private Music	2000
Coco Montoya	Suspicion	Alligator Records	2000
Barbara Blue	Sell My Jewelry	BIG Blue Records	2001
Lucky Peterson	Double Dealin'	Blue Thumb Records	2000
Billy Branch, Joe Lewis Walker	Hellhound On My Trail	Telarc Blues	2001
Billy Branch, Joe Lewis Walker	(Songs Of Robert Johnson)	Telarc Blues	2001
Lucky Peterson	Verve Today 2001	Verve Records, Universal Jazz Germany	2001
Chris Smith	Night Rhythms 2 - Broadcasting The Blues Vol.2	Taxim Records	2001
Coco Montoya	Can't Look Back	Alligator Records	2002
Chris Smith	Night Rhythms 3 - Broadcasting The Blues Vol.3	Taxim Records	2002
Taj Mahal	Martin Scorsese Presents The Blues	Legacy, Columbia	2003
Belushi - Aykroyd	Have Love Will Travel	Have Love Records, Doyle-Kos Entertainment	2003
The Mike Reilly Band	Ol' Knuckleheads	Atlas Records	2003
Dan Aykroyd, Jim Belushi (Compilation Album)	Toronto Rocks	Warner Music Vision	2004
Eric Burdon	My Secret Life	SPV Recordings	2004
W. C. Clark	Deep In The Heart	Alligator Records	2004
Barbara Blue	Memphis 3rd & Beale	BIG Blue Records	2004
Taj Mahal	The Essential Taj Mahal	Columbia, Legacy, Private Music	2005
Taj Mahal & The Phantom Blues Band	Taj Mahal & The Phantom Blues Band In St. Lucia	Sony BMG Music Entertainment, Image Entertainment	2005
Taj Mahal & The Phantom Blues Band	Taj Mahal & The Phantom Blues Band In St. Lucia	BET On Jazz	2005
Bonnie Raitt	I Can't Make You Love Me	iTunes Originals: Bonnie Raitt, Capitol Records, Inc.	2005
Blaze Foley and The Beaver Valley Boys	Cold, Cold World	Lost Art Records	2006
Eric Burdon	Soul Of A Man	SPV Recordings	2006
Maria Muldaur	Maria Muldaur Sings Love Songs Of Bob Dylan - Heart Of Mine	Telarc	2006
Chris Thomas King	Rise	21st Century Blues Records	2006
Barbara Blue	Love Money Can't Buy	BIG Blue Records	2006
Phantom Blues Band	Out Of The Shadows	Delta Groove Productions, Inc.	2006
Buddy Guy	Can't Quit The Blues	Silvertone Records, Legacy	2006
Jodi Siegel	Stepping Stone	Circle	2006
Barbara Blue & The Phantom Blues Band	By Popular Demand	Shout! Records	2007
Crawler	Alive In America	Renaissance Records	2007
Phantom Blues Band	Footprints	Delta Groove Music, Inc.	2007
Zydeco Party Band / Doug Legacy & Mark Shark	Do You Know What It Means?	Self-release	2007
Taj Mahal	Maestro	Heads Up International	2008
Curtis Salgado	Clean Getaway	Shanachie	2008
Maria Muldaur	Women's Voices For Peace Choir - Yes We Can!	Telarc	2008
The Robert Cray Band	This Time	Nozzle Records, Vanguard	2009
Nina Hagen	Personal Jesus	Koch Universal Music	2010
The Robert Cray Band	Cookin' In Mobile	Nozzle Records, Vanguard	2010
Laurie Morvan Band	Breathe Deep	Screaming Lizard Records	2011
Eric Burdon	Misunderstood. 1981 Sessions	Acrobat Music	2011
Curtis Salgado	Soul Shot	Alligator Records	2012
Eric Burdon, Taj Mahal	Chimes Of Freedom: The Songs Of Bob Dylan	Amnesty International	2012
Robert Cray Band	Nothin But Love	Provogue	2012
Beverly McClellan	Fear Nothing - Tour Edition	Favored Nations Entertainment	2012
Robert Cray Band	Tiny Desk Concert	National Public Radio	2012
Teresa James & the Rhythm Tramps	Come on Home	Jesilu Records	2012
Eric Burdon	'Til Your River Runs Dry	ABKCO	2013
Trampled Under Foot	Badlands	Telarc	2013
Hillary Scott	Freight Train Love	Belltown Records, Inc.	2014
Albert Cummings	Someone Like You	Blind Pig Records	2015
Deb Ryder	Let It Rain	Bejeb Records	2015
Deb Callahan	Sweet Soul	Audio & Video Labs, Inc.	2015
Karen Lovely	Ten Miles of Bad Road	Kokako Records	2015
Deb Ryder	Grit Grease & Tears	Bejeb Records	2016
Stoppok	Operation 17	Grundsound	2016
Curtis Salgado	The Beautiful Lowdown	Alligator Records	2016
Annika Chambers	Wild & Free	Under The Radar Music Group	2016
Lisa Biales	Beat of My Heart	Self-Release	2016
Bill Berry	Awkward Stage	Songwriter's Square Records	2016
Coco Montoya	Hard Truth	Alligator Records	2017
Chris Cain	Chris Cain	Little Village Foundation	2017
Deb Ryder	Enjoy the Ride	Vizztone Label Group	2018
Lauren Morvan	Gravity	Screaming Lizard Records	2018
Coco Montoya	Coming In Hot	Alligator Records	2019
Nick Schnebelen	Crazy All By Myself	Vizztone Label Group	2019

Songwriting/Arrangement/Music Production
Artist	Album title	Label	Year
Bloontz	Bloontz	Evolution	1973
Johnny Nash	Celebrate Life	CBS	1974
Back Street Crawler	The Band Plays On	Atlantic	1975
Various	Atlantic/Atco October LP Sampler	Atlantic	1975
Back Street Crawler	The Band Plays On	ATCO Records,	1975
Paul Kossoff	Koss	DJM Records	1977
Crawler	Crawler	Epic, Epic	1977
Crawler	Stone Cold Sober	Epic	1977
Crawler	Crawler Live	Epic	1978
Crawler	Snake, Rattle And Roll	Epic	1978
Ipswich Town F.C., Ipswich Town Supporters Band	"Ipswich, Ipswich (Get That Goal)"	Philips	1978
Crawler	"Sail On" / "Disc Heroes"	Epic	1979
Paul Kossoff	Croydon June 15, 1975	Street Tunes	1983
Taj Mahal & The Phantom Blues Band	Shoutin' In Key	Hannibal Records	2000
Jim Belushi, Dan Aykroyd	Have Love Will Travel	Have Love Records, Doyle-Kos Entertainment	2003
Eric Burdon	My Secret Life	SPV Recordings	2004
Dan Aykroyd, Jim Belushi (Compilation Album)	Toronto Rocks	Warner Music Vision	2004
Taj Mahal	The Essential Taj Mahal	Columbia, Legacy, Private Music	2005
Jodi Siegel	Stepping Stone	Circle	2006
Marcia Ball	Peace, Love & BBQ	Alligator Records	2008
The Robert Cray Band	This Time	Nozzle Records, Vanguard	2009
The Robert Cray Band	Cookin' In Mobile	Nozzle Records, Vanguard	2010
Trampled Under Foot	Wrong Side Of The Blues	TUF Records	2011
Robert Cray Band	Nothin But Love	Provogue	2012
Trampled Under Foot	Badlands	Telarc	2013
Eric Burdon	'Til Your River Runs Dry	ABKCO	2013
Deb Ryder	Let It Rain	Bejeb Records	2015
Deb Ryder	Grit Grease & Tears	Bejeb Records	2016
Nick Schnebelen	Live in Kansas City	Vizztone Label Group	2016
G.T. Moore And The Reggae Guitars	Reggae Reggae / Otis Blue	Charisma	1975
G.T. Moore	Reggae Blue	Charisma	1975
Taj Mahal & The Phantom Blues Band	Shoutin' In Key (Live)	Hannibal Records, Kan-Du Records	2000
Barbara Blue	Sell My Jewelry	BIG Blue Records	2001
Belushi – Aykroyd (Blues Brothers)	Have Love Will Travel	Have Love Records, Doyle-Kos Entertainment	2003
The Mike Reilly Band	Ol' Knuckleheads	Atlas Records	2003
Eric Burdon	My Secret Life	SPV Recordings	2004
Barbara Blue	Memphis 3rd & Beale	BIG Blue Records	2004
Taj Mahal	The Essential Taj Mahal	Columbia, Legacy, Private Music	2005
Eric Burdon	Soul Of A Man	SPV Recordings	2006
Barbara Blue	Love Money Can't Buy	BIG Blue Records	2006
Barbara Blue & The Phantom Blues Band	By Popular Demand	Shout! Records	2007
Curtis Salgado	Clean Getaway	Shanachie	2008
Mike Zito	Today	Eclecto Groove Records	2008
Trampled Under Foot	Wrong Side Of The Blues	TUF Records	2011
Curtis Salgado	Soul Shot	Alligator Records	2012
Taj Mahal, Eric Burdon (Compilation Album)	Chimes Of Freedom: The Songs Of Bob Dylan	Amnesty International	2012
Eric Burdon	'Til Your River Runs Dry	ABKCO	2013
Trampled Under Foot	Badlands	Telarc	2013
Deb Callahan	Sweet Soul	Audio & Video Labs, Inc.	2015
Curtis Salgado	The Beautiful Lowdown	Alligator Records	2016
Annika Chambers	Wild & Free	Under The Radar Music Group	2016
Lisa Biales	Beat of My Heart	Self-Release	2016
Coco Montoya	Hard Truth	Alligator Records	2017
Laurie Morvan	Gravity	Screaming Lizard Records	2018
Danielle Nicole	Cry No More	Concord Records	2018
Jay-Bee & The Ultratone All-Stars	Life Ain't Got No Shortcuts	Adaloc Records	2018
Coco Montoya	Coming In Hot	Alligator Records	2019
Deb Ryder	Enjoy the Ride	Vizztone Label Group	2018
Nick Schnebelen	Crazy All By Myself	Vizztone Label Group	2019
Chris Barnes	Live	VizzTone	2019
The Jimmys	Gotta Have It	Brown Cow Productions	2020
Phantom Blues Band	Stil Cookin'	VizzTone	2020

== Acting ==
From 2001 to 2009, Braunagel had a recurring role as an actor and a drummer on the ABC sitcom, According to Jim, starring Jim Belushi, appearing in around 40 episodes.

== Current ==
Braunagel resides in the Los Angeles area, where he performs and continues to produce music recordings. As of March 2020, he was working on recording projects with Phil Colombato, T Bear, Deb Ryder, Diunna Greenleaf, and Chris Dowd. Braunagel regularly performs music in the Los Angeles area with artists such as Paulie Cerra, Billy Vera (Billy and the Beaters), the Bonedaddys. Also in Los Angeles and elsewhere in the United States and abroad, he regularly performs with Taj Mahal, Blues Brothers, Phantom Blues Band, and Darlene Love.
