= By the Hand of the Father (album) =

Studio album by Alejandro Escovedo
- Released: 2002
- Genre: Tex-Mex, chicano rock
- Label: Texas Music Group
- Producer: Steven Soles

Alejandro Escovedo chronology
A Man Under the Influence (2001)	By the Hand of the Father (2002)	The Boxing Mirror (2006)

Professional ratings
Review scores
Source	Rating
AllMusic	4/5 stars

By the Hand of the Father is a collection of songs from the play By the Hand of the Father, by Alejandro Escovedo, released in 2002.

== Track listing ==
All tracks composed by Alejandro Escovedo; except where indicated

1. "By the Hand of the Father Theme" – 2:57
2. "Wave" – 5:27
3. "Did You Tell Me?" (Gabriel Tenorio, Guillermo Rios, Quetzal Flores) – 3:36
4. "Dos Hermanos/Two Brothers" – 2:35
5. "Ballad of the Sun and the Moon" – 5:37
6. "Mexico Americano" (Rumel Fuentes) – 2:52
7. "Seven Years" – :46
8. "Rosalie" – 5:36
9. "Hard Road" (Javier Escovedo) – 4:23
10. "59 Years" (Brian Standefer) – 2:05
11. "Inside This Dance" (Alejandro Escovedo, J. Steven Soles) – 4:51
12. "Cancion Mixteca" (Jose Lopez Alvaez) – 5:05
13. "With These Hands" - 4:43
14. "Silence" - 6:40
15. "And Yet/Theme" - 4:38

== Personnel ==
- Elliott Baribeault - Bass, Bajo Sexto, Backup Vocal
- Alejandro Escovedo - Guitar, Vocals, Liner Notes
- Pete Escovedo - Percussion
- Quetzal Flores - Bajo Sexto
- Rosie Flores - Vocals
- Larry Hirsch - Engineer, Mastering, Mixing
- Otoño Lujan - Accordion
- Rocío Marron - Violin
- Hector Muñoz - Percussion
- Doug Pettibone - Electric Guitar, Steel Guitar, Slide Guitar, Hi String Guitar
- Rubén Ramos - Vocals, Voiceover
- César Rosas - Vocals
- J. Steven Soles - Bass, Piano, Vocals, Producer
- Gabriel Tenorio - Electric Guitar, Hi String Guitar, Requinto
