= Beckett (band) =

British hard rock band

Beckett were an English progressive rock band formed in Newcastle upon Tyne in 1970. The band released one self-titled album in April 1974 (produced by Roger Chapman, the former vocalist of Family) and disbanded shortly thereafter. Original singer Rob Turner was killed in a car crash and replaced by Terry Wilson-Slesser, who would later go on to perform with Back Street Crawler and then Geordie whose previous front man Brian Johnson left to join AC/DC in 1980.

== Iron Maiden copyright lawsuit ==
In 2017, Beckett songwriter Brian Ingham sued Iron Maiden for copyright infringement over two popular songs, "Hallowed Be Thy Name" and "The Nomad", which lifted musical sections and lyrics from the song "Life's Shadow". Iron Maiden manager Rod Smallwood was the agent for Beckett and a teenage Steve Harris saw the band play this song live. Harris and Dave Murray settled with one of the credited songwriters, Robert Barton. Ingham was unaware of the matter until 2011 and Barton claimed to be the sole songwriter during the original settlement. Iron Maiden stopped performing "Hallowed Be Thy Name" on their 2017 tour as a result. The issue was settled out of court in March 2018, with the song returning to Iron Maiden's live set after this.

== Band members ==
- Terry Wilson-Slesser - vocals
- Robert Barton - guitar, vocals
- Arthur Ramm - guitar, vocals
- Keith Fisher - drums
- Ian Murray - bass
- Kenny Mountain - guitar, keyboards, vocals
- Tim Hinkley - keyboards
- Rob Turner - vocals
- Les Tones - guitar
- Alan Craig - drums

== Discography ==
=== Albums ===
- Beckett (1974, Raft Records)

=== Singles ===
- Little Girl (1973, Raft Records)
- My Lady (1974, Raft Records)
- Wishing Well (1989, Beckett Records)
