= The Band Plays On =

Studio album by Back Street Crawler
- Released: October 1975
- Genres: Hard rock, blues rock
- Length: 44:16
- Label: Atlantic
- Producer: Back Street Crawler

Back Street Crawler chronology
The Band Plays On (1975)	2nd Street (1976)

The Band Plays On is the debut album from Back Street Crawler, fronted by ex-Free guitarist Paul Kossoff. Keyboard player Mike Montgomery composed six songs and co-wrote two others on the album, in addition to singing lead vocals on "All the Girls Are Crazy" and "Survivor". He dueted with Terry Wilson-Slesser on "New York, New York" (a Mike Montgomery original, and not the tune made famous by Liza Minnelli and Frank Sinatra). Montgomery subsequently left the band and was replaced by John "Rabbit" Bundrick.

The Mike Montgomery songs, "Jason Blue" and "It's a Long Way Down to the Top", had previously appeared on a self-titled 1973 album by Bloontz, in which Terry Wilson, Mike Montgomery and Tony Braunagel had played together prior to the formation of Back Street Crawler.

== Track listing ==
All tracks composed by Mike Montgomery; except where indicated

1. "Hoo Doo Woman" (Back Street Crawler) - 4:17
2. "New York, New York" - 4:40
3. "Stealing My Way" (Mike Montgomery, Paul Kossoff) - 4:21
4. "Survivor" - 3:35
5. "It's a Long Way Down to the Top" - 5:58
6. "All The Girls Are Crazy" - 3:33
7. "Jason Blue" - 4:57
8. "Train Song" (Terry Wilson, Tony Braunagel) - 4:36
9. "Rock & Roll Junkie" - 3:17
10. "The Band Plays On" (Terry Wilson) - 5:02

== Personnel ==
Back Street Crawler

- Paul Kossoff - guitar
- Terry Wilson-Slesser - vocals
- Terry Wilson - guitar, bass guitar
- Tony Braunagel - drums
- Mike Montgomery - keyboards, vocals

with:

- Pete Van - baritone saxophone on "Jason Blue" & "Rock & Roll Junkie"
- Eddie Quansah - trumpet, flugelhorn on "Jason Blue" & "Rock & Roll Junkie"
- George Lee - flutes, tenor & soprano saxophones on "Jason Blue" & "Rock & Roll Junkie"

=== Production ===
- Produced by Back Street Crawler for Oak Records Ltd & Steve Smith (track 3)
- Engineered by Rod Thear
- Recorded at Ridge Farm Studios (tracks 1–2, 4–5, 7–8, 9–10) & Sawmills (tracks 3, 6)
- Track 1 Recorded at Ridge Farm with the Ronnie Lane Mobile Studio
- Mixed at Olympic Studios, London (tracks 1–2, 4–5, 9–10) & Basing Street Studios, London (tracks 3)
- Remixed at Olympic Studios, London (tracks 6–8)
- Richard Polak - photography
