= With These Hands =

With These Hands may refer to:

- With These Hands (film), a 1950 documentary film
- With These Hands (The Farmer's Boys album), 1985
- With These Hands (Alejandro Escovedo album), 1996
- With These Hands..., a 1956 album by Randy Weston
- "With These Hands" (song), a 1950 song with music by Abner Silver and words by Benny Davis, recorded by many artists
- With These Hands, a 1951 short story by Cyril M. Kornbluth
