= By the Hand of the Father =

By The Hand of the Father is an original theatrical work that combines spoken word, music, and video to dramatize the unique 20th century journey of the Mexican-American father.

The productions original music by singer/songwriter Alejandro Escovedo, is interwoven with stories written by Theresa Chavez, Oscar Garza, Eric Gutierrez and Rose Portillo; and video by Janice Tanaka. It is directed by Theresa Chavez, Artistic Director of About...Productions; and produced by About...Productions, a Los Angeles-based theater company; and Paula Batson Productions, an independent production company focusing on music projects.

Premiering in June, 2000, at Plaza de la Raza's Margo Albert Theatre in Los Angeles, it has played numerous venues throughout the U.S., and in Canada. It was featured in the 2002–03 season of Austin City Limits—the first time the long-running PBS music show has presented a theatrical work.

Performances of By The Hand of the Father have been presented at The Getty Center, Los Angeles (March 2001); the Autry National Center, Los Angeles (2001); 24th Street Theatre, Los Angeles (April 2001); Mexican Fine Arts Center Museum, Chicago (May 2001); Seattle Experience Music Project, Seattle, WA (July, 2001); the High Performance Rodeo in Calgary, Alberta (Jan, 2002); the Banff Centre for the Arts in Alberta, Canada (Jan, 2002); Texas Union Theatre, Austin (June, 2002); Luckman Center for the Arts, Los Angeles (July 2002); and Gammage Auditorium at Arizona State University (April, 2003).

During Escovedo's battle with Hepatitis C, the production was fronted by either Rosie Flores or Rick Treviño at the following venues: International Hispanic Theatre Festival, Miami/Ft. Lauderdale (June, 2003); John Anson Ford Amphitheatre, Los Angeles (June, 2003); Merced Playhouse (October, 2003); George Mason University, Wash., D.C./Fairfax (Oct 2004); Mondavi Center @ UC Davis, (Oct 2004); Luther Burbank Center, Santa Rosa (Nov 2004); University of Arizona (Nov 2004); and the National Ensemble Theatre Festival (June, 2005).

Escovedo returned to the production in 2006 for performances at University of Texas, Brownsville (April, 2006), and University of Texas, Austin (April, 2006).

In 2002, the CD of songs and stories from the original theaterwork was released and included guest artists Pete Escovedo, Rosie Flores, Ruben Ramos and Cesar Rosas (of Los Lobos).

The characters were performed by Rose Portillo and Kevin Sifuentes on both the tour and album. By the Hand of the Father (album)
