= Wishing Like a Mountain and Thinking Like the Sea =

Studio album by Poi Dog Pondering
- Released: 1990
- Label: Columbia
- Producers: Mike Stewart, Poi Dog Pondering

Poi Dog Pondering chronology
| Fruitless (1990) | Wishing Like a Mountain and Thinking Like the Sea (1990) | Jack Ass Ginger (1992) |

Wishing Like a Mountain and Thinking Like the Sea is an album by the American band Poi Dog Pondering, released in 1990. The first single was "U-Li-La-Lu". The band supported the album with a North American tour.

== Production ==
The album was produced by Mike Stewart and the band, which included eight members for the recording sessions. Most of it was recorded in Austin, Texas, with additional work at studios in the U.S. and England. Poi Dog Pondering used more than 36 different instruments during the sessions; they chose not to rehearse before recording in order to give the songs a spontaneous quality. Frontman Frank Orrall thought that the band used all of their musical influences to create a unique sound, rather than acting merely as ethnomusicologists. Susan Voelz played a mandocello on "Fruitless". "The Me That Was Your Son", about a deceased mother, was inspired by zouk music. "The Ancient Egyptians" is dedicated to Jonathan Richman.

== Critical reception ==
Professional ratings
Review scores
| Source | Rating |
|---|---|
| AllMusic | 3/5 stars |
| Calgary Herald | B |
| Entertainment Weekly | C+ |
| Los Angeles Times | 4/5 stars |
| MusicHound Rock: The Essential Album Guide | 3/5 stars |
| Ottawa Citizen | 4/5 stars |
| The Rolling Stone Album Guide | 1.5/5 stars |

The Chicago Tribune considered the album "a bit more focused and folky effort but one that continues Poi Dog's wide-eyed celebration of simple pleasures." Trouser Press opined that it "betrays the band's whimsically beautiful music with a slick, hippified mélange of overarching 'global musics' and dry, by-the-book folk." The Milwaukee Journal wrote that the band "makes refreshing hodgepodge pop that recalls everything from Herb Alpert to Paul Simon's Graceland to an Appalachian jug band."

Entertainment Weekly concluded that Poi Dog Pondering "seem to accept their favorite assumptions much too easily... Long before the end of the album, their music has started to sound just as facile." The Los Angeles Times noted that "a panoply of musical styles—Afro-Hawaiian sort of describes some of it—and the multiple pleasures of life make up the world beat trod by Poi Dog." The Calgary Herald labeled the album "relentlessly sunny, chaotic music." The Ottawa Citizen considered the songs to be "always too weird to be frivolous."

AllMusic deemed Wishing Like a Mountain and Thinking Like the Sea Review "an irresistible party of an album," writing that "the band's globetrotting instrumental inventiveness was infectious and impressive." The Rolling Stone Album Guide wrote that "the lyrics are insufferably inane."

== Track listing ==
| No. | Title | Length |
|---|---|---|
| 1. | "Bury Me Deep" |
| 2. | "Watermelon Song" |
| 3. | "U-Li-La-Lu" |
| 4. | "Everybody's Trying" |
| 5. | "Big Beautiful Spoon" |
| 6. | "The Ancient Egyptians" |
| 7. | "Spending the Day in the Shirt That You Wore" |
| 8. | "Thanksgiving" |
| 9. | "Praise the Lord" |
| 10. | "The Me That Was Your Son" |
| 11. | "Fruitless" |
| 12. | "Big Walk" |
| 13. | "Sugarbush Cushman" |
