= Poi Dog Pondering =

American band

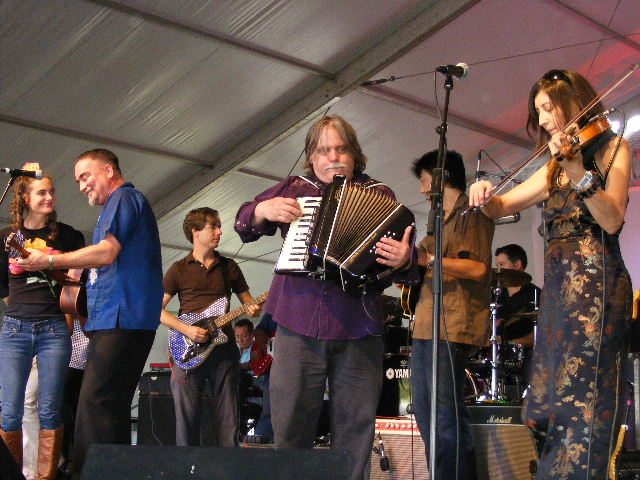
- Poi Dog Pondering performing at the 2009 Austin City Limits Music Festival

Background information
- Origin: Hawaii, U.S. Austin, Texas; Chicago, Illinois
- Genres: Acoustic soul, alternative rock, soul, orchestral pop, electronica
- Occupation: Musicians
- Years active: 1984–present
- Labels: Platetectonic Music; Texas Hotel Records, Columbia, Tommy Boy Records, Barnone, Premonition Records
- Members: Frank Orrall; Abra Moore; John Nelson; Ted Cho; Dave Max Crawford; Susan Voelz; Paul Mertens; Kornell Hargrove; Dag Juhlin; Ron Hall; Rick Geherenbeck; Charlette Wortham; Robert Cornelius; Carla Prather; Ryan Murphy; Cicely Elam; Naomi Davis
- Website: Official site

Poi Dog Pondering is an American musical group which is noted for its cross-pollination of diverse musical genres, including various forms of acoustic and electronic music. Frank Orrall founded the band in Hawaii in 1984, initially as a solo project, and as his music production alias. In 1986 Orrall formed the first line-up of PDP to perform its first concert at the Honolulu Academy of Arts. The band then embarked on a yearlong street performance busking tour across North America. They eventually settled down in Austin, Texas in 1988, where they recorded 2 E.P. (extended play) albums for Texas Hotel Records, and 2 subsequent full-length albums for Columbia Records. In 1992, the band relocated to Chicago and they began to incorporate orchestral arrangements and elements of electronic, house music, and soul music into their acoustic rock style.

The membership of Poi Dog Pondering has evolved from album to album, with over three dozen members having drifted in and out of the line-up; at any given time, the band may feature from eight to over a dozen players on stage. Frank Orrall (vocals, guitar, other instruments) has been the sole constant player since 1984 (the inception of the band). Abra Moore (vocals), John Nelson (percussion), and Ted Cho (electric guitar, mandolin, bass), joined in 1986. Dave Max Crawford (organ, trumpet, accordion), Bruce Hughes (bass, vocals), Adam Sultan (guitar), and Susan Voelz (violin, guitar, vocals) joined the group in 1988, Erika Winklebleck (Superfan and broomstick bristler), Paul Mertens (flute, sax, clarinet), Dag Juhlin (guitar), Robert Cornelius, and Kornell Hargrove (vocals) joined in 1993. The rest of the current line-up joined in 1999 through early 2000. Some members have left the group and returned at various times.

== Hawaii / Street performing years; members ==
During the Hawaii years (1985–1986), the band had the following lineup:

- Frank Orrall – guitar, vocals, marimba, penny whistle
- Abra Moore – Guitar, vocals, accordion
- Sean Coffey – Drums
- John "el John" Nelson – Percussion
- Kalea Chapman – Guitar, vocals
- Jean Francois Berneron – Photographer, cook, vocals, recorder
- Cliff Kamida – Guitar, harmonica
- Ted Cho – Mandolin, guitar
- Joe Espinda – Guitar, recording engineer
- Matt Miller – Bass, vocals

== Austin years; members ==
During the Austin years (1988–1992), the band had the following lineup:

- Frank Orrall – guitar, tin flute, drums, vocals
- Ted Cho – electric guitar, mandolin, bass
- Dave Max Crawford – organ, trumpet, accordion
- Darren Hess – drum kit (1991–1992)
- Bruce Hughes – bass, vocals, guitar
- John Nelson – congas, maracas, tom-toms, background vocals (1989–1992)
- Dick Ross – drum kit (1987–1990)
- Adam Sultan – electric guitar, acoustic guitar, vocals
- Susan Voelz – violin, guitar, vocals

Additionally, the records featured literally dozens of musicians credited as "Satellite Poi Members". Most prominent amongst these satellite members were vocalists Abra Moore and Malford Milligan, sound artist Ellen Fullman, drummer Sean Coffey and (on their third album) turntable operator Ashton "DJ Cassanova" Irons.

Beginning with that third album, 1992's Volo Volo, the band began to experiment with new musical styles, including fully incorporating DJ Cassanova into the line-up. Orrall's emerging interest in dance and house music led the band to relocate to Chicago in 1992, where it developed a loyal local following and was named best band by Chicago magazine in 1997, and "Best Pop and Rock Act" in the 2009 Chicago Readers Poll.

== Early Chicago years; members ==
From 1993 to 1999, the band recorded the albums Pomegranate and Natural Thing and performed live with the following members in the lineup:

- Frank Orrall – guitar, vocals
- Dave Max Crawford – keyboards, clavinet
- Paul Mertens – sax, clarinet, flute
- Susan Voelz – violin
- Dag Juhlin – guitar
- Eddie Carlson – bass
- Brent Olds – bass
- Tom Ray – bass
- Nick Kitsos – drums
- Steve Goulding – drums
- Leddie Garcia – percussion
- Arlene Newson – backing vocals
- Kornell Hargrove – backing vocals
- Robert Cornelius – backing vocals

Satellite members:

- Brigid Murphy – alto saxophone
- Jason More – berimbau
- Lloyd Brodnax King – alto flute
- Katherine Pisaro – oboe

== Mid-Chicago years; members ==
From 1999 to 2013 (and for the album releases In Seed Comes Fruit, 7 and Audio Love Letter), the band had the following members:

- Frank Orrall – vocals, guitar, piano, synth. vibes, drums, samples, sequencing
- John "El John" Nelson – percussion, drums
- Susan Voelz – violin, vocals
- Paul Mertens – flute, sax, clarinet
- Leddie Garcia – congas, bongos, ganzas, bells, shakers, various percussion
- Kornell Hargrove – vocals
- Ron Hall – bass
- Rick Gehrenbeck – Rhodes electric piano, clavinet, organ, synthesizers
- Charlette Wortham – vocals
- Alison Chesley – cello
- Carla Prather – vocals
- Tim Gant – piano, synthesizers
- Earl A. Talbot – drums
- Dan Leali – drums

== Current Poi Dog Pondering Line-up; members ==
- Frank Orrall – vocals, guitar, piano, synth. vibes, drums, samples, sequencing
- Abra Moore – guitar, vocals, accordion
- John Nelson – congas, bongos, drums, various percussion
- Ted Cho – guitar, mandolin
- Dave Max Crawford – organ, piano, trumpet, trombone, flugelhorn, electric piano (Wurlitzer), clavinet, synthesizer, theremin
- Susan Voelz – violin, vocals
- Paul Mertens – flute, sax, clarinet
- Dag Juhlin – guitar
- Kornell Hargrove – vocals
- Ron Hall – bass
- Rick Gehrenbeck – Rhodes electric piano, clavinet, organ, synthesizers
- Charlette Wortham – vocals
- Robert Cornelius – vocals
- Carla Prather – vocals
- Ryan Murphy – drums
- Cicely Elam – vocals
- Naomi Davis – vocals

== Discography ==
=== Early 4 track cassette albums ===
- Poi Dog Pondering PDP X 1 (1984)
- Poi Dog Pondering Soliloqui PDP X 2 (1985)
- 8 Songs by Poi Dog Pondering PDP X 3 (1985)
- Poi Dog Pondering Thawing Spring PDP X 5 (1986)
- Poi Dog Pondering Dig PDP X 4 (1986)
- Hawaii to Texas (live 1987)
- Vision Farming Hula Circus (live 1987)

=== Studio albums ===
- Poi Dog Pondering (1989)
- Wishing Like a Mountain and Thinking Like the Sea (1990)
- Volo Volo (1992)
- Pomegranate (1995)
- Natural Thing (1999)
- In Seed Comes Fruit (2003)
- 7 (2008)
- Audio Love Letter (2011)
- Everybody's Got a Star (2015)
- Remnants of Summer (2018)
- Keep on Loving Each Other (2023)

=== Other releases ===
- Fruitless (EP) (1990)
- Vague Gropings in the Slip Stream (Palm Fabric Orchestra) (1994)
- Electrique Plummagram (Re-Mix Album) (1996)
- That's the Way Love Is (Re-Mix EP) (1999)
- Intermittent Transmissions from the SlipStream (Palm Fabric Orchestra) (2018)

=== Live albums ===
- Liquid White Light (1997)
- Soul Sonic Orchestra (2000)
- Live at Metro Chicago (4-CD set, paired with DVD release, Dec 21, 2012)

=== Compilations ===
- Sweeping Up the Cutting Room Floor (2001)
- The Best of Poi Dog Pondering (The Austin Years) (2005)
- Song Seeds of 7 (Demos and Outtakes) (2018)
- Four on the Floor – Dance Floor Rarities and Remixes: 1994–2018 (2018)
- Sweeping Up the Cutting Room Floor – Volume 2 (2018)
- The Best of The Hawai'i Years" Poi Dog Pondering (2024)

=== DVD releases ===
- Audio Visivo (2004)
- Live at Metro Chicago (2 DVD set, paired with CD release, Dec 21, 2012)
