= Rumel Fuentes =

Chicano artist, musician and activist

Rumel Fuentes was a Chicano artist, musician and activist of the late 1960s and 1970s Chicano Movement in the United States. He is known for his songs about migrant laborers, Chicano identity, and the every day life of Chicanos and immigrants in the US.

== Early life and education ==
Rumel Lopez Fuentes was born on June 25, 1943 in the border town of Eagle Pass, Texas. He was the 9th of 11 children of Isidro Fuentes and Damacia (López) Fuentes, a Mexican migrant labor family. They traveled seasonally on the migrant trail to Indiana, Michigan, and near the Canadian border to work on farms and canneries.

Fuentes graduated from Eagle Pass High School in 1961. He traveled 60 miles from Eagle Pass to earn his A.A. degree. He attended the University of Texas in Austin for his Bachelors degree, and received his Master's in Education in 1974. He was the only one in his family to graduate from high school and post secondary education.

== Career ==
Fuentes met Jo Zettler in 1967 who was a VISTA volunteer in Eagle Pass and married in 1968. After their marriage, Fuente and Zettler moved to Austin, where Fuentes attended the University of Texas in Austin. Fuentes and Zettler joined El Teatro Chicano de Austin, that performed skits similar to the El Teatro Campesino founded by Luiz Valdez. In addition to skits, El Teatro became a platform for Fuentes to perform his music and became an influence in the Chicano Movement in Texas. Fuentes was a supporter of the La Raza Unida Party. During this period, Fuentes and Zettler performed together as Rumel Y Jo con Teatro Chicano.

In 1970, Fuentes met Chris Strachwitz, founder of Arhoolie Records, in Eagle Pass. Fuentes worked with Strachwitz to document Mexican norteño musicians along the border like the group Los Pinguinos del Norte. This first collaboration resulted in the live recording of Music of La Raza Vol. 1: Topical Songs from the Rio Grande Valley by Los Pinguinos del Norte. Fuentes and Los Pinguinos appeared in the music documentary Chulas Fronteras (1976), which was named to the National Film Registry in 1993.

In April and May of 1972, Fuentes collaborated again with Strachwitz to record home sessions of Fuentes, Zettler and musicians Chano Castillo on 12-string guitar and Luis Ortiz on requinto guitar. Arhoolie Records did not release the 1972 home recordings until 2009. Strachwitz feared, much to Fuentes' frustration, a lack of audience for this kind of music. The recordings were released in CD format titled Corridos of the Chicano Movement.

In 1973, his compositions were published in the spring issue of El Grito, A Journal of Contemporary Mexican-American Thought, a journal based at UC Berkeley.

After graduating from the University of Texas in Austin in 1974, Fuentes moved back to Eagle Pass and taught elementary school.

Fuentes died of liver disease on October 10, 1986 in San Diego, CA. He is buried in Greenwood Memorial Park.

== Musical influence and legacy ==
As a composer, guitarist and singer-songwriter, his songs focused on the Chicano Movement and its leaders like Cesar Chavez, migrant workers, and the every day struggles of Mexican Americans in the United States. He also composed songs about historical figures like Joaquin Murietta, Reies Lopez Tijerina. Fuentes performed with a trio of guitars, singing at political rallies, voter registration drives and grassroots events and venues throughout Texas. Fuentes was first introduced to Mexican corridos by his father at a young age. In addition to corridos, other known influences were Bob Dylan and Johnny Cash.

Two of Fuentes' singles are included in the Americo Paredes' Archive that is a part of University of Texas in Austin's Benson Latin American Collection. The singles are "Soy Chicano" with "Corrido de Cesar Chavez" and "Mexicano Americano" with "Yo Soy Tu Hermano".

His songs have been covered by multiples artists. His most popular song, "Mexico Americano" has been covered by Los Lobos (2005), Alejandro Escovedo, La Santa Cecilia, and Los Texmaniacs. Los Cenzontles performed a live cover of the song at the John F. Kennedy Center for the Performing Arts in Washington D.C. in 2019.

== Personal life ==
Fuentes was married Jo Zettler on June 1, 1968 until their divorce in 1975.

== Discography ==
- Corridos of the Chicano Movement (2009)
