= Gravity (Alejandro Escovedo album) =

Studio album by Alejandro Escovedo
- Released: 1992
- Studios: The Hit Shack, Austin, Texas
- Genre: Folk rock
- Length: 50:39
- Label: Watermelon
- Producer: Turner Stephen Bruton

Alejandro Escovedo chronology
Gravity (1992)	Thirteen Years (1994)

Gravity is the début album of Alejandro Escovedo, released in 1992.

== Critical reception ==
Professional ratings
Review scores
Source	Rating
AllMusic	4.5/5 stars
Rolling Stone	4/5 stars

Trouser Press wrote: "In the clarified artistic vision of a mature musician with a broken heart, a spiritual sense of his place in the world and a rich, resonant voice, Escovedo devised an electric folk idiom ... powerfully suited to the poetic hair shirt he donned."

== Track listing ==
All tracks composed by Alejandro Escovedo

1. "Paradise" – 4:16
2. "Broken Bottle" – 3:53
3. "One More Time" – 3:46
4. "By Eleven" – 4:03
5. "Bury Me" – 5:24
6. "Five Hearts Breaking" – 4:10
7. "Oxford" – 4:25
8. "Last to Know" – 5:00
9. "She Doesn't Live Here Anymore" – 4:24
10. "Pyramid of Tears" – 4:00
11. "Gravity/Falling Down Again" – 7:18

== Personnel ==
- Alejandro Escovedo - vocal, acoustic guitar
- Turner Stephen Bruton - slide guitar, electric slide guitar, electric guitar, acoustic guitar, mandolin, vocal harmony
- Chris Knight - keyboards
- Barry "Frosty" Smith - drums, percussion
- Dennis Kenmore - drums
- Rick Poss - electric twelve-string guitar
- Terry Wilson - bass
- John Hagen - cello
- Marty Muse - pedal steel guitar
- Thierry Le Coz - electric guitar
- Bill Ginn - piano
- Lou Ann Barton - vocal harmony
- Bill Averbach - trumpet on "Bury Me"
- J. D. Foster - vocal harmony
- Cid Sanchez - lead guitar on "Oxford"
- Spencer Starnes - double bass on "She Doesn't Live Here Anymore"
- Bruce & Charlie Robison - vocal harmonies
- Dennis Kenmore, Jay Hudson, T.S. Bruton, Chris Knight, "Big Wave" Dave McNair, J.D. Foster, Alejandro Escovedo - The Cappuccino Choir
- Maya Escovedo, Megan Ewing - The Screaming Me Me's

Technical

- Heinz Geissler, John T. Kunz - executive producer
- Kathy Marcus - art direction, design
- Dana Lee Smith - illustration
