= The Pawn Shop Years =

Studio album by Buick MacKane
- Released: February 25, 1997
- Recorded: 1993, 1996
- Studios: Sweatbox, Austin, Texas
- Genres: Garage rock, rock 'n' roll
- Label: Rykodisc
- Producer: Tim Kerr

The Pawn Shop Years is the only album by the American band Buick MacKane, released on February 25, 1997. Formed due to frontman Alejandro Escovedo's desire to lead a garage rock band, they were named for the T. Rex song. The band supported the album with a North American tour.

== Production ==
Most of the album was recorded in 1996 at Sweatbox Studios, in Austin, Texas. The band had been playing for eight years at that point, with a 1993 attempt at recording mostly derailed by drinking too much beer in the studio. "Loose" is a cover of the Stooges song. "The End" and "Say Goodnight" are versions of songs Escovedo recorded for earlier solo albums. "John Conquest, You've Got Enough Dandruff on Your Collar to Bread a Veal Cutlet" was written in response to a negative review from an Austin music critic.

== Critical reception ==
Professional ratings
Review scores
Source	Rating
AllMusic	4/5 stars
Chicago Tribune	3.5/4 stars
Robert Christgau	(dud)
The Encyclopedia of Popular Music	3/5 stars
Orlando Sentinel	4/5 stars
Stereo Review	4/5 stars

The Sunday Times called the album "a twin guitar tequila slammer of a record, eased down by the lemon slice of Escovedo's pedigree songwriting skills". The Chicago Tribune said that "the record's blend of great hooks and reckless bashing makes for a grimy good time." Rolling Stone praised the "uproarious liquor-and-fuzz-box attack".

The Times Colonist concluded that "The Pawn Shop Years comes, conquers and destroys with far more devastating effect than many a self-important hard rock band purporting to do this for a living." The Orlando Sentinel labeled it an "unrepentant blast of nasty, dirty rock 'n' roll". Stereo Review said, "Too polished to be punk and too straight-ahead to be a Seventies throwback, Buick MacKane is simply a terrific rock-and-roll band". The Capital Times listed The Pawn Shop Years as the tenth best album of 1997.

== Track listing ==
No.	Title	Length
1.	"The End"
2.	"Falling Down Again"
3.	"Black Shiny Beast"
4.	"Edith"
5.	"Queen Anne"
6.	"Say Goodnight"
7.	"Big Shoe Head"
8.	"John Conquest, You've Got Enough Dandruff on Your Collar to Bread a Veal Cutlet"
9.	"Wandering Eye"
10.	"Loose"
