= Real Animal =

Studio album by Alejandro Escovedo
- Released: June 10, 2008
- Genre: Rock
- Length: 50:34
- Label: Back Porch/Manhattan
- Producer: Tony Visconti

Alejandro Escovedo chronology
The Boxing Mirror (2006)	Real Animal (2008)

Professional ratings
Aggregate scores
Source	Rating
Metacritic	83/100
Review scores
Source	Rating
AllMusic	4/5 stars
The A.V. Club	B
The Austin Chronicle	4/5 stars
Now	4/5 stars
PopMatters	9/10
Rolling Stone	3.5/5 stars
Slant Magazine	3.5/5 stars
Spin	4/5 stars
Tiny Mix Tapes	3.5/5 stars
Uncut	4/5 stars

Real Animal is a studio album by Alejandro Escovedo, released in 2008. It was produced by Tony Visconti, and co-written with Chuck Prophet.

== Track listing ==
All tracks composed by Alejandro Escovedo and Chuck Prophet

1. "Always a Friend" – 3:35
2. "Chelsea Hotel '78" – 3:30
3. "Sister Lost Soul" – 4:16
4. "Smoke" – 4:23
5. "Sensitive Boys" – 4:29
6. "People (We're Only Gonna Live So Long)" – 3:21
7. "Golden Bear" – 3:58
8. "Nuns Song" – 4:50
9. "Real As An Animal" – 3:05
10. "Hollywood Hills" – 3:42
11. "Swallows of San Juan" – 4:06
12. "Chip N' Tony" - 3:10
13. "Slow Down" - 4:09

== Personnel ==
- Alejandro Escovedo - Primary Artist, Guitar, Harmonica, Vocals
- Chuck Prophet - Guitar, Background Vocals
- Susan Voelz - Violin, Background Vocals
- Tony Visconti - Producer, Arranger, Mixer, Organ, Background Vocals
- Hector Muñoz - Percussion, Drums, Background Vocals
- Josh Gravelin - Bass, Keyboards, Background Vocals
- Brian Standefer - Cello, Background Vocals
- David Pulkingham - Guitar, Keyboards, Background Vocals
- Brad Grable - Baritone Saxophone, Tenor Saxophone
- Strings arranged by Brian Standefer, Susan Voelz, Tony Visconti
