= Guidance (album) =

Studio album by Russian Circles
- Released: August 5, 2016
- Studio: GodCity Studio
- Genres: Post-metal; instrumental rock; post-rock
- Length: 41:10
- Label: Sargent House
- Producer: Kurt Ballou

Russian Circles chronology
| Memorial (2013) | Guidance (2016) | Live at Dunk! Fest (2017) |

Guidance is the sixth studio album by American post-metal band Russian Circles, released on August 5, 2016 through Sargent House. The album was recorded and produced at GodCity Studio by Kurt Ballou.

== Critical reception ==
Professional ratings
Aggregate scores
| Source | Rating |
|---|---|
| Metacritic | 81/100 |
Review scores
| Source | Rating |
| AllMusic | 4/5 stars |
| Consequence of Sound | B |
| Drowned in Sound | 9/10 |
| Exclaim! | 9/10 |
| The Guardian | 5/5 stars |
| musicOMH | 4/5 stars |
| Pitchfork | 7.5/10 |
| PopMatters | 7/10 stars |

Guidance was met with critical acclaim. The album received an average score of 81/100 from 15 reviews on Metacritic, indicating "universal acclaim". AllMusic writer Paul Simpson praised the album's combination of heavy music and melodic ambience, saying, "Rough and explosive yet perfectly controlled, Guidance is yet another powerful statement from the heavy instrumental rock behemoths." Writing for Exclaim!, Trystan MacDonald hailed the album as "another prophetic portrait conjuring apocalyptic dimensions in the minds of those who listen". Kate Hutchinson of The Guardian wrote that "doom has never sounded so good." Jason Heller of Pitchfork said, "There's an organic and unforced feel to the latest album by Chicago-based post-rock trio Russian Circles, as if songs were allowed to grow wild rather than carefully cultivated." Brice Ezell of PopMatters wrote a slightly less glowing review, saying that the album occasionally stumbles, but that "when [it] hits, it hits hard."

== Track listing ==
| No. | Title | Length |
|---|---|---|
| 1. | "Asa" | 4:01 |
| 2. | "Vorel" | 5:30 |
| 3. | "Mota" | 6:34 |
| 4. | "Afrika" | 6:32 |
| 5. | "Overboard" | 5:33 |
| 6. | "Calla" | 6:24 |
| 7. | "Lisboa" | 6:33 |
| Total length: | | 41:10 |

== Personnel ==
Russian Circles

- Brian Cook – bass
- Mike Sullivan – guitar
- Dave Turncrantz – drums

Technical personnel

- Kurt Ballou – recording, engineering, production
- Ben Chisholm – design
- Robert Cheeseman – engineering
- Carl Saff – mastering

== Charts ==
| Chart (2016) | Peak position |
|---|---|
| US Top Alternative Albums (Billboard) | 17 |
| US Top Hard Rock Albums (Billboard) | 6 |
| US Heatseekers Albums (Billboard) | 3 |
| US Independent Albums (Billboard) | 12 |
| US Top Rock Albums (Billboard) | 22 |
| US Top Album Sales (Billboard) | 71 |
| US Indie Store Album Sales (Billboard) | 17 |
| US Vinyl Albums (Billboard) | 4 |
| Swiss Albums (Schweizer Hitparade) | 55 |
