= Thirteen Years =

Studio album by Alejandro Escovedo
- Released: 1993
- Genre: Alternative country, heartland rock
- Length: 52:02
- Label: Watermelon
- Producer: Turner Stephen Bruton

Alejandro Escovedo chronology
Gravity (1992)	Thirteen Years (1993)	With These Hands (1996)

Professional ratings
Review scores
Source	Rating
AllMusic	4/5 stars
Rolling Stone	4/5 stars

Thirteen Years is an album by Alejandro Escovedo. The cover painting is by Jack Smith.

== Critical reception ==
Ira Robbins, in Trouser Press, wrote that "the album — a testament to patience and virtue — is a marvel of presentation more than content."

== Track listing ==
All tracks composed by Alejandro Escovedo and Stephen Bruton

1. "Thirteen Years Theme" – 0:49
2. "Ballad of the Sun and the Moon" – 4:33
3. "Try, Try, Try" – 4:35
4. "Way It Goes" – 4:54
5. "Losing Your Touch" – 3:56
6. "Thirteen Years" – 4:03
7. "Thirteen Years Theme" – 1:10
8. "Helpless" – 4:37
9. "Mountain of Mud" – 3:48
10. "Tell Me Why" – 3:47
11. "Thirteen Years Theme" – 1:25
12. "She Towers Above" – 4:50
13. "Baby's Got New Plans" – 4:51
14. "The End" – 3:41
15. "Thirteen Years Theme" – 1:03

== Personnel ==
- Alejandro Escovedo - guitar, vocals
- Dave McNair - guitar, percussion
- Turner Stephen Bruton - electric guitar
- Charlie Sexton - electric guitar
- Cid Sanchez - electric guitar
- Marty Muse - pedal steel guitar
- Terry Wilson - bass
- Barry "Frosty" Smith - drums, percussion
- David Bender - drums
- Megan Levin - harp
- Susan Voelz - violin
- Danny Levin - violin
- David Perales - violin
- Frank Kammerdiener - cello
- Tom Canning - piano, keyboards
- Jon Blondell - trombone section
- Mickey Raphael - harmonica
- Malford Milligan - vocal extraordinaire, harmony vocal
- Bobby Neuwirth - harmony vocal
- Bill Averbach - arranger on "Ballad of the Sun and the Moon"
