= 2nd Street (album) =

Studio album by Back Street Crawler
- Released: April 1976
- Genre: Hard rock, blues rock
- Label: Atco Records
- Producer: Back Street Crawler

Back Street Crawler chronology
The Band Plays On (1975)	2nd Street (1976)

2nd Street is the second studio album by the English rock band Back Street Crawler and was released on the Atco Records label. It was released after Paul Kossoff's death in March 1976, and is dedicated to him. The album is regarded as a considerable advance on their 1975 debut The Band Plays On, but Kossoff's involvement in it is limited to lead guitar lines over the completed tracks.

== Track listing ==
Side One
No.	Title	Writer(s)	Length
1.	"Selfish Lover"	John "Rabbit" Bundrick	3:26
2.	"Blue Soul"	Terry Wilson	3:46
3.	"Stop Doing What You're Doing"	Back Street Crawler	3:26
4.	"Raging River"	Terry Wilson	3:16
5.	"Some Kind of Happy"	Terry Wilson	5:00

Side Two
No.	Title	Writer(s)	Length
1.	"Sweet, Sweet Beauty"	Terry Wilson	3:14
2.	"Just for You"	John "Rabbit" Bundrick, Dean Rutherford	6:18
3.	"On Your Life"	John "Rabbit" Bundrick	3:54
4.	"Leaves in the Wind"	John "Rabbit" Bundrick, Dean Rutherford	5:12

== Personnel ==
Back Street Crawler

- Terry Wilson Slesser – lead vocals
- Paul Kossoff – lead guitar
- Terry Wilson – bass, acoustic and electric guitars
- John "Rabbit" Bundrick – keyboard, vocals
- Tony Braunagel – drums, vocals

with:

- W.G. 'Snuffy' Walden [uncredited] - guitar

Technical

- Richard Digby Smith - engineer
- Glyn Johns - mixing
- Abie Sussman, Bob Defrin - art direction
- Sam Emerson - photography
