= Crawler (band) =

British heavy rock band

- Genre: Hard rock
- Years active: 1976–1979
- Label: Epic Records
- Spinoff of: Back Street Crawler
- Past members: Terry Wilson-Slesser; Terry Wilson; Tony Braunagel; John 'Rabbit' Bundrick; Geoff Whitehorn

Crawler were a British heavy rock band formed in the late 1970s as an offshoot of Back Street Crawler, following the death of guitarist, Paul Kossoff.

== History ==
Following the death of founding member Paul Kossoff, the remaining members of the band Back Street Crawler (John 'Rabbit' Bundrick, Tony Braunagel, Terry Wilson and Terry Wilson-Slesser) decided that it would be best to move on to both another record label and another manager. There is and was a history of problems with the band members obtaining record and publishing royalties from the original manager of Paul Kossoff.

Atlantic Records' Ahmet Ertegun had wanted to replace Paul Kossoff with Mick Taylor, who had left the Rolling Stones, however Taylor did not want to replace a musician who had died. Back Street Crawler bassist Terry Wilson had dinner with ex-Fleetwood Mac guitarist Peter Green in London to find out whether Peter's reclusive and unusual lifestyle had changed his mind about wanting to play or be in the music business. Green was not ready to return to the stage and therefore turned-down Crawler's offer. The band then recruited former If guitarist Geoff Whitehorn. The band was then dropped by Atlantic Records, due to Whitehorn's then relative obscurity.

The band switched management to a young American named Abe Hoch, who was working at Swan Song Records at the time with Led Zeppelin manager Peter Grant. Hoch had close ties with Epic/CBS Records and obtained an offer from them. Band members then shortened the band name to Crawler.

Crawler initially toured the UK as part of a package tour which included label mates Boxer and Moon. Their debut album, Crawler, did well in the US, thanks to airplay of the track "Stone Cold Sober", on FM radio stations. The band concentrated on the American market. Working with producer Gary Lyons, they released a second album, Snake, Rattle & Roll.

An exhaustive series of live performances saw Crawler as the support band for Robin Trower, Cheap Trick, and Foreigner, and a 54-date tour across the US as support band for Kansas. At the end of a US tour in December 1978, keyboard player John 'Rabbit' Bundrick left to work with The Who. The band folded soon afterwards.

Crawler had limited commercial success but charted the single "Stone Cold Sober" which reached a peak on Billboard Hot 100 at number 65 in November 1977.

In recent years, a number of live albums, including Snakebite (2001) and Pastime Dreamer (2003), recorded during tours in 1977 and 1978, have been released from John Bundrick's private collection of recordings.

== Post-Crawler ==
After the dissolution of the band, Terry Wilson-Slesser went on to join Charlie He also provided backing vocals on Def Leppard's Pyromania album. In 1984, Wilson-Slesser acted as an offstage singer for the Michael Schenker Group, performing on a European and Japanese tour.

Geoff Whitehorn has since played with Maggie Bell, Elkie Brooks, Roger Chapman's band Shortlist, Bad Company and Roger Waters. He has also released several solo albums including Geoff Who? and Big In Gravesend. In the 1990s, the guitarist teamed up with ex-Free and Bad Company vocalist Paul Rodgers. In 1991, he joined Procol Harum and is now their longest serving guitarist. He appears on their DVDs at Union Chapel and with a Danish symphony orchestra in Ledrebourg.

Bassist Terry Wilson has since worked with Jimmy Reed, Lightnin' Hopkins, Eric Burdon, Little Whisper & The Rumor, Teresa James & the Rhythm Tramps (producing as well as being a principal songwriter), The Stephen Bruton Band, Bill Champlin, Pockets, Delbert McClinton and Gary Nicholson. He has also contributed to the sessions for John Martyn, Stephen Bruton, Darling Cruel's 1993 album Passion Crimes and Ana Popović's Still Making History. As a songwriter, Wilson has had his songs covered by such artists as Eric Burdon, Maria Muldaur, Kathy Mattea, Tommy Castro, Paul Rodgers, Juice Newton, Teresa James and Tamara Champlin. Wilson has also had several songs included in movie soundtracks, such as Michael and Holes.

Drummer Tony Braunagel went to on to work with Bette Midler, Rickie Lee Jones, Taj Mahal, Andy Fraser, Buddy Guy, B.B. King, John Martyn, John Mayall, Ian McNabb, Keb Mo, Maria Muldaur, Bonnie Raitt, The Blues Brothers, Teresa James & the Rhythm Tramps. He has also acted as a producer or co-producer, including records by Taj Mahal, Jodie Siegal, Curtis Salgado and on Eric Burdon's Soul Of A Man (2006).

== Albums ==
- 1977 - Crawler (Epic)
- 1978 - Snake, Rattle & Roll (Epic)
- 1997 - Pastime Dreamer (Live) (Red Steel; re-released 2003; recorded 1977)
- 2001 - Snake Bite (Live) (Pilot; recorded 1978)
- 2002 - Crawler Live - Agora Club Ohio 1978 (Angel Air)
