= Volo Volo =

Studio album by Poi Dog Pondering
- Released: 1992
- Genre: Worldbeat
- Label: Columbia
- Producers: Alan Winstanley, Clive Langer, Jerry Harrison

Poi Dog Pondering chronology
Jack Ass Ginger EP (1991)	Volo Volo (1992)	Pomegranate (1995)

Volo Volo is an album by the American worldbeat band Poi Dog Pondering. It was released in 1992 via Columbia Records. The album title is allegedly Swahili for "revolver". Poi Dog Pondering supported the album with a North American tour.

The album was a commercial disappointment, with only 50,000 copies sold by the fall of 1993. Columbia dropped the band; to regroup, several members of Poi moved from Austin to Chicago.

== Production ==
The band built the songs by creating the rhythms first, before adding other instruments on top of the drum patterns. About half of the album was produced by Alan Winstanley and Clive Langer. Jerry Harrison also worked on Volo Volo.

== Critical reception ==
Professional ratings
Review scores
Source	Rating
AllMusic	2.5/5 stars
Chicago Tribune	2.5/4 stars
MusicHound Rock: The Essential Album Guide	4.5/5 stars
The Rolling Stone Album Guide	3/5 stars

The Washington Post wrote that "instead of acoustic rag-tag charm and unpredictability, something [the band's] early recordings had in abundance, Volo Volo offers a more focused and groove-oriented sound." Trouser Press thought that the album "bears an occasional disconcerting resemblance to smart UK popsters like the Smiths, Wedding Present and Waterboys."

The New York Times deemed the band's sound "a kind of world beat-influenced earth music," writing that Volo Volo "celebrates buildings, collarbones, thunder and the joy of shaking one's booty." Spin panned the album, declaring that "this is kinda like a 'Don't Worry Be Happy' stew that's so dull you'll be jonesin' for some raw flesh to bite into." The Philadelphia Inquirer disparaged the "techno-dance seasonings," opining that Poi had hopped on the "EMF/Happy Mondays bandwagon."

AllMusic wrote that "interestingly, Poi Dog Pondering here seems to be attempting a move into a more pop-oriented direction, sounding at times like a bizarre meeting between Santana, the Meters, Wham!, and Simple Minds." MusicHound Rock: The Essential Album Guide praised the "amazingly haunting" violin of Susan Voeltz.

== Track listing ==
No.	Title	Length
1.	"Lackluster"
2.	"Collarbone"
3.	"Get Me On"
4.	"The Hardest Thing"
5.	"Ta Bouche Est Tabou"
6.	"I've Got My Body"
7.	"Jack Ass Ginger"
8.	"Be the One"
9.	"Tall"
10.	"Building"
11.	"Te Manu Pukarua"
12.	"Blood and Thunder"
13.	"Entrance"
14.	"Endtrance"
