= Geneva (Russian Circles album) =

2009 studio album by Russian Circles

Studio album by Russian Circles
- Released: October 20, 2009
- Recorded: May 2009 at Electrical Audio in Chicago, Illinois
- Genre: Post-rock, post-metal
- Length: 46:01
- Label: Suicide Squeeze; Sargent House
- Producer: Brandon Curtis

Russian Circles chronology
Russian Circles / These Arms Are Snakes (2008)	Geneva (2009)	Empros (2011)

Professional ratings
Aggregate scores
Source	Rating
Metacritic	79/100
Review scores
Source	Rating
AllMusic	4/5 stars
Drowned In Sound	(8/10)
Pitchfork Media	(7.8/10)
PopMatters	9/10 stars
Unrated Magazine	7.5/10 stars

Geneva is the third studio album by American post-metal band Russian Circles, and was released on October 20, 2009. The album was recorded in May 2009 with Brandon Curtis of The Secret Machines. The vinyl version of the album was released by Sargent House and was available on both a black 2x12" 45 rpm edition and a more limited clear 2x12" 45 rpm edition.

== Tracks ==
No.	Title	Length
1.	"Fathom"	4:55
2.	"Geneva"	5:49
3.	"Melee"	7:39
4.	"Hexed All"	4:29
5.	"Malko"	4:43
6.	"When the Mountain Comes to Muhammad"	8:00
7.	"Philos"	10:26

== Personnel ==
- Mike Sullivan − guitar
- Dave Turncrantz − drums
- Brian Cook − bass guitar
- Alison Chesley − cello
- Susan Voelz − violin
- Greg Norman − engineering, trumpet, trombone
- Brandon Curtis − production, additional piano
- Joe Lambert − mastering
- Chris Strong − album photo
- Sasha Barr − album layout

== Charts ==
Chart (2009)	Peak position
US Heatseekers Albums (Billboard)	24
