= Pomegranate (Poi Dog Pondering album) =

Studio album by Poi Dog Pondering
- Released: 1995
- Label: Pomegranate/Bar/None
- Producer: Frank Orrall, Martin Stebbing, Poi Dog Pondering

Poi Dog Pondering chronology
| Volo Volo (1992) | Pomegranate (1995) | Electrique Plummagram (1996) |

Pomegranate is an album by the American band Poi Dog Pondering, released in 1995. It was first released in a limited edition by the band's label, with a national release by Bar/None Records. The band supported the album with a North American tour. Pomegranate sold more than 40,000 copies in its first six months of release. "Catacombs" was released as a single. An EP, Electrique Plummagram, contained dance remixes of some Pomegranate tracks.

== Production ==
The album was produced by Frank Orrall, Martin Stebbing, and the band. It was recorded in an empty basketball gym in Chicago over a period of seven months. The band, which raised around $10,000 for the sessions, aimed for a production that would sound good in a dance club. Frontman Orrall used a handheld microphone for many of the songs, recording "Diamonds and Buttermilk" while crawling around the floor. Orrall thought that Pomegranate was a more cohesive album than the band's previous releases. Steve Goulding played drums on Pomegranate. "God's Gallipoli" addresses the leukemic lymphoma of bandmember Brigid Murphy; Orrall, partly in response to criticism of the band's previous albums, tried to write songs about more serious matters.

== Critical reception ==
Professional ratings
Review scores
| Source | Rating |
|---|---|
| AllMusic | 4/5 stars |
| MusicHound Rock: The Essential Album Guide | 1.5/5 stars |

Trouser Press wrote: "A collection of groovy, danceable numbers propelled by Orrall's dramatic voice and overly poetic lyricism, Pomegranate manages to recapture both the fun-loving spirit and accomplished musicianship that made Poi Dog such a delight at the start." The Austin American-Statesman determined that "what we have is a funk, soul, techno, psychedelic, artsy, hippie, Whole Foods-eating, Zooropa-inspired band with transcendental lyrics and a staggering nine members." CMJ New Music Monthly praised the "Kraftwerk-meets-disco" sound of "Chain".

The Washington Post concluded that, "though impeccably performed and arranged, the resulting sound—frequently folkie, sometimes funky—is seldom anything more than facile." The Chicago Tribune deemed the album "Poi's most infectiously danceable disc, and also its moodiest." Texas Monthly called it "a deep and—believe it or not—dark multigenre piece set amid a bubbling stew of strings, horns, percussion, and odd electro-funk pulsing, plus other weirdly beautiful noises."

AllMusic noted that "they're at their most sublime and inimitable in the pop ballads."

== Track listing ==
| No. | Title | Length |
|---|---|---|
| 1. | "Pomegranate" |
| 2. | "Catacombs" |
| 3. | "Complicated" |
| 4. | "The Chain" |
| 5. | "Big Constellation" |
| 6. | "Sandra at the Beach" |
| 7. | "Diamonds and Buttermilk" |
| 8. | "Shu Zulu Za" |
| 9. | "God's Gallipoli" |
| 10. | "The Shake of Big Hands" |
| 11. | "Al le Luia" |
