= Blood Year =

Studio album by Russian Circles
- Released: August 1, 2019
- Studio: Electrical Audio
- Genres: Post-metal; instrumental rock; post-rock
- Length: 39:29
- Label: Sargent House
- Producer: Kurt Ballou

Russian Circles chronology
Live at Dunk! Fest (2017)	Blood Year (2019)	Gnosis (2022)

Blood Year is the seventh studio album by American post-metal band Russian Circles, released on August 1, 2019 through Sargent House. The album was recorded and produced at GodCity Studio in Salem and Steve Albini's Electrical Audio Studio in Chicago by Kurt Ballou.

== Track listing ==
No.	Title	Length
1.	"Hunter Moon"	2:20
2.	"Arluck"	6:33
3.	"Milano"	6:35
4.	"Kohokia"	7:18
5.	"Ghost on High"	2:34
6.	"Sinaia"	7:30
7.	"Quartered"	6:39
Total length:		39:29

== Personnel ==
Russian Circles

- Brian Cook – bass
- Mike Sullivan – guitar
- Dave Turncrantz – drums

Technical personnel

- Kurt Ballou – recording, engineering, production

== Charts ==
Chart (2019)	Peak position
Scottish Albums (Official Charts)	59
Swiss Albums (Schweizer Hitparade)	40
