= Russian Circles =

American post-metal band

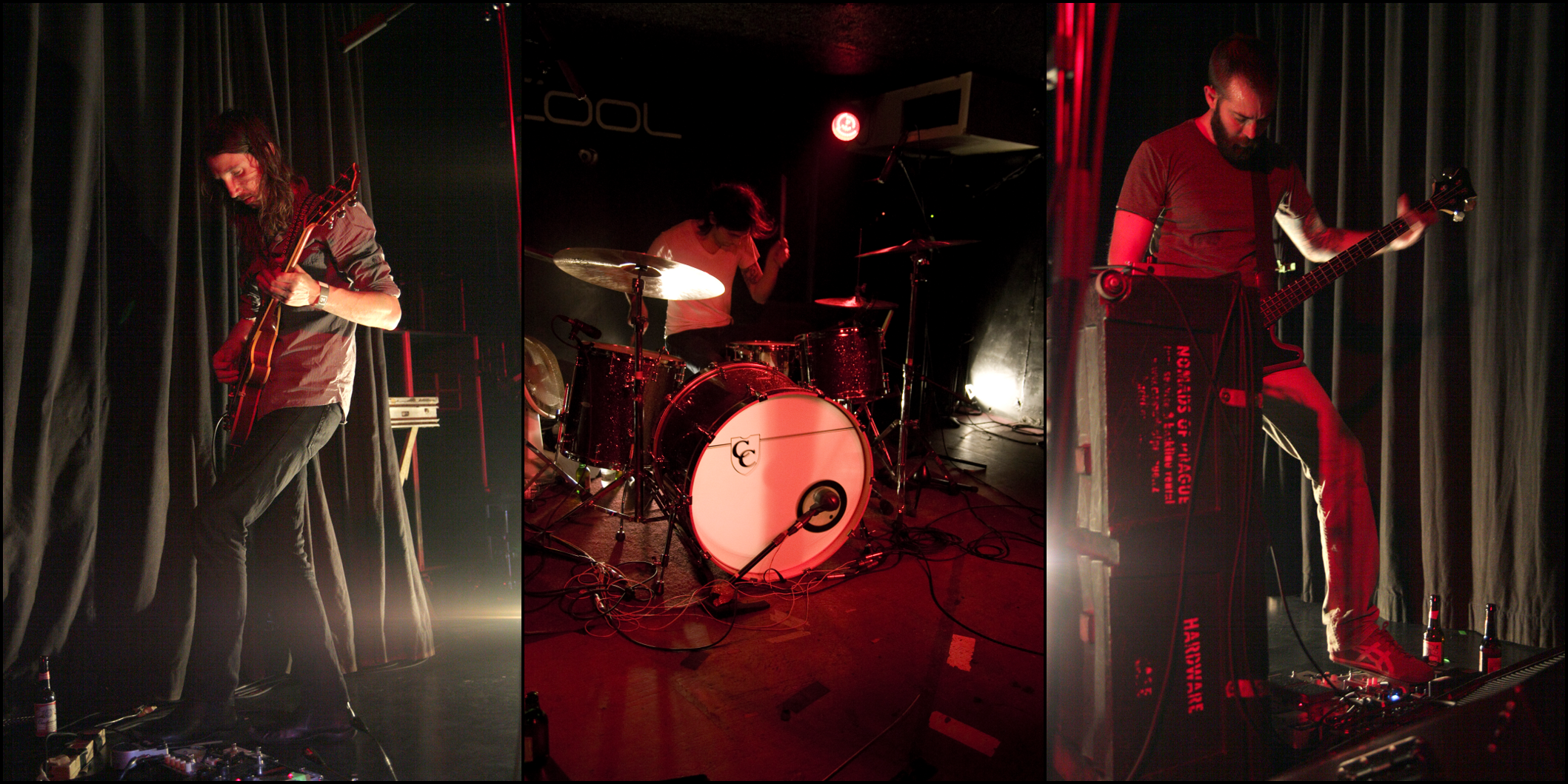
- Russian Circles (left to right): Mike Sullivan, Dave Turncrantz, Brian Cook

Background information
- Origin: Chicago, Illinois, U.S.
- Genres: Post-metal; post-rock
- Years active: 2004–present
- Labels: Flameshovel, Sargent House, Suicide Squeeze
- Members: Mike Sullivan; Dave Turncrantz; Brian Cook
- Past members: Colin DeKuiper
- Website: russiancircles.com

Russian Circles is an American instrumental post-metal band based in Chicago, Illinois. The band was originally formed by childhood friends Mike Sullivan and Dave Turncrantz after their previous musical projects dissolved. After parting ways with their original bass player Colin DeKuiper in 2007, the trio was rounded out by Brian Cook. The band has gained widespread recognition based on a series of critically acclaimed albums and extensive international touring. Their name is taken from a drill exercise used in ice hockey, a sport Sullivan and Turncrantz grew up playing in their original hometown of St. Louis.

== History ==
Russian Circles was formed in late 2004 by guitarist Mike Sullivan and bassist Colin DeKuiper (both formerly of instrumental band Dakota/Dakota), they quickly recruited drummer Dave Turncrantz, formerly of St. Louis band Riddle of Steel.

In the autumn of 2007, it was announced that the band had parted ways with Colin DeKuiper. As a result, the bass tracks on their second album, titled Station, were handled by ex-Botch/These Arms Are Snakes bass player Brian Cook, who then joined the band permanently. The group's third full-length, Geneva, was released on October 20, 2009 and reached No. 24 on the Billboard Heatseekers chart.

In 2011, Russian Circles signed to Sargent House who had previously only exclusively released the band's albums on limited edition vinyl. Their fourth studio album Empros was released on October 25, 2011. A supporting tour with Deafheaven followed the release. In May 2013 the group began recording their fifth studio album, produced by Brandon Curtis. Memorial was released at the end of October 2013 and featured a guest-vocal by Chelsea Wolfe. Together they embarked on a co-headlining UK/European tour in the fall.

Russian Circles released its sixth studio album Guidance on August 5, 2016 through Sargent House. The album was produced by Kurt Ballou of Converge fame. On August 1, 2019, they released their seventh studio album, Blood Year, recorded at GodCity Studio in Salem and Steve Albini's Electrical Audio Studio in Chicago and again produced by Kurt Ballou.

The band's eighth album Gnosis was released on August 19, 2022 via Sargent House. It was engineered and mastered by Kurt Ballou.

The band's ninth album Nine was released on August 28, 2026 via Sargent House. It was engineered and mastered again by Kurt Ballou, who worked with Russian Circles for Blood Year and Gnosis.

== Discography ==
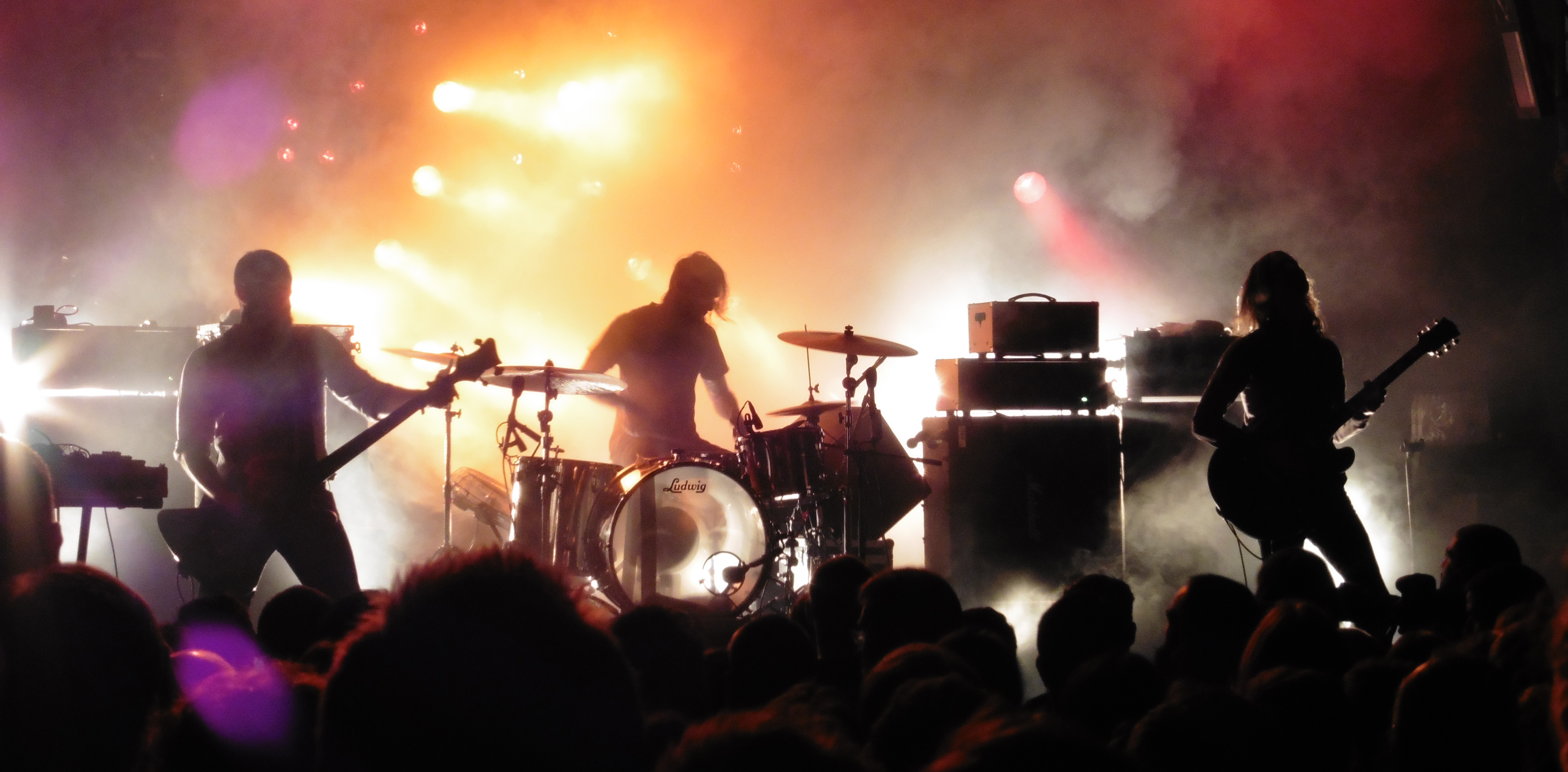
Live in Madrid in 2015

=== Studio albums ===
- Enter (2006, Flameshovel)
- Station (2008, Suicide Squeeze)
- Geneva (2009, Suicide Squeeze)
- Empros (2011, Sargent House)
- Memorial (2013, Sargent House)
- Guidance (2016, Sargent House)
- Blood Year (2019, Sargent House)
- Gnosis (2022, Sargent House)
- Nine (2026, Sargent House)

=== EPs ===
- Russian Circles (2004, self-released)
- Audiotree Far Out (2020, Audiotree Music)

=== Live albums ===
- Live at Schubas 05/27/2005 (2005, Re:Live)
- Live at Dunk! Fest (2017, Sargent House)

=== Singles ===
- "Upper Ninety" (2006, Suicide Squeeze)

=== Splits ===
- Russian Circles / These Arms Are Snakes (split with These Arms Are Snakes) (2008, Sargent House)

=== Music videos ===
- "Gnosis" (2022)
- "Empath" (2026)
- "Eluvial" (2026)
- "Seventh Seal" (2026)
