= Karen Lovely =

American electric blues singer-songwriter (born 1959)

- Born: Karen Patricia Lovely; November 23, 1959 (age 66); Massachusetts, United States
- Genres: Electric blues
- Occupations: Singer, songwriter
- Years active: 2007–present
- Website: Official website

Karen Patricia Lovely (born November 23, 1959) is an American electric blues singer and songwriter. Lovely has released five albums to date, with her most recent being Fish Outta Water (2017). She was a nominee at the 2016 Blues Music Awards as "Contemporary Blues Female Artist of the Year".

Lovely is known for her "passionate, driven performances", and her "powerfully sultry" voice.

== Life and career ==
Karen Lovely, who was born in Massachusetts, United States, is the eldest of nine siblings and initially sang in the local church choir. In 1987, she relocated to London, England, where she gave her first public performance, before returning to Los Angeles six months later. Lovely started singing the blues professionally in September 2007 and released her debut album, Lucky Girl, in November 2008. Lovely and her band claimed second place in the band category, at the 2010 International Blues Challenge. Her 2010 offering, Still the Rain, was also released by Pretty Pear Records. She and her band have appeared at the Waterfront Blues Festival, the Britt Festival, and the Oregon Shakespeare Festival's Green Show.

Her album Ten Miles of Bad Road (2015), was recorded at Ultratone Studios in Studio City, California. Her backing comprised Johnny Lee Schell and Alan Mirikitani on guitar, James "Hutch" Hutchinson on bass, Jim Pugh on piano and keyboards, with Tony Braunagel on drums and record production. There was a guest appearance by Kim Wilson on harmonica. The 13 tracks included 12 original songs written by Lovely, Dave Fleschner, Vyasa Dodson, Alan Mirikitani and Dennis Walker. The title track was inspired by Curtis Salgado, who also shared the songwriting credits with Lovely and Fleschner.

In 2017, Lovely toured across North America, with concert dates in Switzerland in April that year.

== Discography ==
=== Albums ===
Year	Title	Record label
2008	Lucky Girl	Pretty Pear Records
2010	Still The Rain	Pretty Pear Records
2014	Prohibition Blues	Sounds Lovely Records
2015	Ten Miles of Bad Road	Kokako Records
2017	Fish Outta Water	Not On Label
