= The Boxing Mirror =

Studio album by Alejandro Escovedo
- Released: May 2, 2006
- Recorded: 2005
- Genre: Alternative rock, avant-rock, chicano rock, heartland rock
- Label: Back Porch
- Producer: John Cale

Alejandro Escovedo chronology
By the Hand of the Father (2002)	The Boxing Mirror (2006)	Real Animal (2008)

Professional ratings
Aggregate scores
Source	Rating
Metacritic	81/100
Review scores
Source	Rating
AllMusic	4.5/5 stars
The Austin Chronicle	4.5/5 stars
The A.V. Club	B
Entertainment Weekly	A−
Now	5/5 stars
The Guardian	4/5 stars
PopMatters	6/10
Rolling Stone	3.5/5 stars
Spin	8/10
Uncut	6/10

The Boxing Mirror is a 2006 album by Alejandro Escovedo. released through Back Porch Records. Produced by John Cale, the album finds Escovedo delving into the worlds of avant-rock and post-punk; and its darker sound has only shades of roots rock/Americana music in comparison with most Escovedo's alt-country records. Legendary bassist, Mark Andes (Spirit, Jo Jo Gunne, Firefall, Heart, Eliza Gilkyson, Jon Dee Graham, Ian McLagan), plays and sings back-up vocals.

== Track listing ==
All tracks composed by Alejandro Escovedo except as noted.

1. "Arizona" – 4:51
2. "Dear Head on the Wall" (Kim Christoph, Alejandro Escovedo) – 3:40
3. "Notes On Air" (Bukka Allen, Kim Christoff, Robbie Gjersoe, Brian Standefer) – 4:14
4. "Looking For Love" – 4:08
5. "The Ladder" – 2:55
6. "Break This Time" – 4:04
7. "Evita's Lullaby" – 4:23
8. "Sacramento and Polk" – 4:54
9. "Died a Little Today" – 3:46
10. "Take Your Place" (Mark Andes, Alejandro Escovedo, Matt Fish, Jon Dee Graham, Hector Muñoz, David Pulkingham, Barry Salmon, Brian Standefer) – 3:19
11. "The Boxing Mirror" – 5:43
12. "Take Your Place" (Alternative Mix) (Andes, Escovedo, Fish, Graham, Muñoz, Pulkingham, Salmon, Standefer) - 3:11

== Personnel ==
- Alejandro Escovedo - acoustic and electric guitar, vocals
- John Cale - guitar, keyboards, producer
- Mark Andes - bass, backing vocals
- Jon Dee Graham - guitar
- Hector Muñoz - drums
- David Pulkingham - acoustic and electric guitar, backing vocals
- Matt Fish - cello
- Brian Standefer - cello
- Susan Voelz - violin, backing vocals
- Bruce Salmon - keyboards, backing vocals
- Otoño Lujan - accordion
- Wade Short - stand-up bass
- Wesley Kimler - cover painting, artwork
- Nita Scott - executive producer
- Michael Cano - paintings
- Heinz Geissler - executive producer, management
- Larry Goetz - bass, guitar, engineer, mixing
- Alan Yoshida - mastering
