= Live at Dunk! Fest =

Live album by Russian Circles
- Released: April 7, 2017 (digital); April 13, 2017 (vinyl)
- Recorded: May 7, 2016; Zottegem, Belgium
- Genre: Post-metal
- Length: 67:54
- Label: Sargent House
- Producer: Russian Circles

Russian Circles chronology
Guidance (2016)	Live at Dunk! Fest (2017)	Blood Year (2019)

Live at Dunk! Fest is the second live album by American post-metal band Russian Circles, released digitally and on vinyl through Sargent House. The album was recorded on May 7, 2016 at a performance in Zottegem, Belgium. This release marks the band's first live album.

== Background ==
On May 7, 2016, Russian Circles headlined at a festival in Zottegem, Belgium. Unbeknownst to the band, the show was being professionally recorded. In explaining why this worked out for the best, bassist Brian Cook said, “Going into a show with the plan of documenting it on record was never really something we were too excited about. Too much pressure. Good shows aren’t a matter of playing everything perfectly; it’s a matter of creating a good vibe.”

== Track listing ==
No.	Title	Length
1.	"Deficit"	7:20
2.	"309"	7:47
3.	"Afrika"	7:00
4.	"Harper Lewis"	7:57
5.	"Geneva"	5:50
6.	"1777"	7:37
7.	"Vorel"	5:38
8.	"Mládek"	9:22
9.	"Youngblood"	9:20
Total length:		67:54

== Personnel ==
Credits adapted from liner notes.

Russian Circles

- Mike Sullivan – guitar
- Brian Cook – bass
- Dave Turncrantz – drums

Technical personnel

- Chris Le Dantec – front of house engineer
- Jannes Van Rossom – audio recording
- Dallas Thomas – mixer
- Collin Jordan – mastering
- Error! Design – artwork
- Davy De Pauw – concert photography
- Gosia Wanda – concert photography
