= Bourbonitis Blues =

Studio album by Alejandro Escovedo
- Released: May 4, 1999
- Genre: Alternative rock, alternative country, chicano rock
- Label: Bloodshot
- Producer: Chris Stamey

Alejandro Escovedo chronology
| More Miles Than Money: Live 1994-1996 (1998) | Bourbonitis Blues (1999) | A Man Under the Influence (2001) |

Professional ratings
Review scores
| Source | Rating |
|---|---|
| AllMusic | 3/5 stars |
| Robert Christgau | (1-star Honorable Mention) |
| Orlando Sentinel | 5/5 stars |
| Pitchfork Media | 6.1/10 |

Bourbonitis Blues is an album by the musician Alejandro Escovedo, released in 1999 on Bloodshot Records.

== Production ==
The tracks were recorded in Austin and in North Carolina, with a few live recordings from a Chicago show.

== Critical reception ==
No Depression deemed the album "a modest effort: a mix of covers and fresh originals, studio tracks and live cuts, bound together with no apparent logic other than it’s all good, warm, current work."

== Track listing ==
All tracks composed by Alejandro Escovedo; except where indicated

1. "I Was Drunk" (Live) – 4:53
2. "Irene Wilde" (Ian Hunter) – 2:52
3. "California Blues" (Live) (Jimmie Rodgers) – 3:21
4. "Guilty" – 4:54
5. "Amsterdam" (John Cale) – 3:43
6. "Everybody Loves Me" – 3:26
7. "Pale Blue Eyes" (Live) (Lou Reed) – 6:15
8. "Sacramento & Polk" (Live) – 4:44
9. "Sex Beat" (Jeffrey Lee Pierce) – 4:09

== Personnel ==
- Alejandro Escovedo - acoustic and electric guitar, vocals
- Bill McCullough - pedal steel
- Glenn Fukunaga - bass
- Mycle Konopka - mixing
- Hector Muñoz - drums
- David Perales - violin, backing vocals
- Maya Escovedo - photography
- Joe Eddy Hines - acoustic and electric guitar
- Todd V. Wolfson - photography
- Chris Phillips - drums, percussion
- Dana Lee Smith - artwork
- Melissa Swingle - harmonica, backing vocals
- Timothy Powell - engineer
- Brian Standefer - cello
- Tom V. Ray - bass
- Chris Stamey - bass, guitar, harmonium, producer, engineer
- Tim Harper - engineer
- Kelly Hogan - vocals
- Jon Langford - acoustic guitar, vocals
