= A Man Under the Influence =

Studio album by Alejandro Escovedo
- Released: April 24, 2001
- Studio: Modern Recording, Chapel Hill, North Carolina
- Genre: Roots rock
- Length: 50:09
- Label: Bloodshot
- Producer: Chris Stamey

Alejandro Escovedo chronology
Bourbonitis Blues (1999)	A Man Under the Influence (2001)	By the Hand of the Father (2002)

A Man Under the Influence is the fifth studio album by the American singer-songwriter Alejandro Escovedo, released on April 24, 2001, on Bloodshot Records. It was produced by Chris Stamey. A deluxe edition was released on November 15, 2009.

== Critical reception ==
Professional ratings
Review scores
Source	Rating
AllMusic	4/5 stars
The Austin Chronicle	4/5 stars
Blender	3/5 stars
Now	4/5
Pitchfork	8.3/10
Q	3/5 stars
Rolling Stone	4/5 stars
The Rolling Stone Album Guide	4.5/5 stars
Slant Magazine	4/5 stars
Spin	7/10

Billboard wrote that A Man Under the Influence was "the best studio performance Escovedo has ever delivered". Similarly, Joshua Klein wrote in The A.V. Club that the album "could be Escovedo's best yet", and James Mann said in PopMatters that the album was "far and away his best work".

Several critics also commended Stamey's production on the album: Joe Tangari wrote in Pitchfork that on the track "Velvet Guitar", his production "keeps [the five guitarists on that track] all in their respective places, avoiding a sloppy mess." Additionally, Raoul Hernandez wrote in The Austin Chronicle that Stamey "deserves credit for the LP's overall cohesion of sound", while Michael Barclay of Exclaim! wrote that Stamey's production "captures the mood perfectly".

Conversely, Robert Christgau of The Village Voice selected "Wave" and "Castanets" as "choice cuts", indicating good songs "on an album that isn't worth your time or money."

== Track listing ==
All tracks composed by Alejandro Escovedo; except where indicated

1. "Wave"
2. "Rosalie"
3. "Rhapsody" (Escovedo, Stephen Barber)
4. "Across the River"
5. "Castanets"
6. "Don't Need You"
7. "Follow You Down" (Escovedo, Stephen Barber)
8. "Wedding Day" (Escovedo, JD Foster)
9. "Velvet Guitar"
10. "As I Fall"
11. "About This Love"

== Personnel ==
- Alejandro Escovedo - acoustic guitar, electric guitar, vocals
- Ryan Adams - vocal harmony, backing vocals
- Lynn Blakey - vocal harmony, backing vocals
- Caitlin Cary - violin, backing vocals
- Tonya Lamm - vocal harmony, backing vocals
- Michael "Cornbread" Traylor - bass
- Mike Daly - bass, 12-string electric guitar, acoustic guitar, mando-guitar, mandolin, pedal steel
- Mitch Easter - electric guitar, engineer
- Eric Heywood - pedal steel, pump organ, vocal harmony
- Joe Eddy Hines - electric guitar, slide guitar
- Hector Muñoz - drums, orchestral percussion, tambourine
- Aaron Oliva - bowed double bass, double bass
- David Perales - violin, vocal harmony
- Chip Robinson - vocal harmony, backing vocals
- Chris Stamey - bass, acoustic guitar, baritone guitar, electric guitar, Kurzweil synthesizer, sleigh bells, engineer
- Brian Standefer - cello
- Jon Wurster - shaker

Technical

- John Plymale, Tim Harper - mixing
- Markus Greiner - design
- Dana Lee Smith - artwork
