= Gnosis (Russian Circles album) =

Studio album by Russian Circles
- Released: August 19, 2022
- Recorded: September–October 2021
- Studio: Electrical Audio, (Chicago); God City, (Salem)
- Genre: Post-metal; instrumental rock; post-rock
- Length: 39:39
- Label: Sargent House
- Producer: Kurt Ballou

Russian Circles chronology
Blood Year (2019)	Gnosis (2022)	Nine (2026)

Singles from Gnosis
- 1. "Conduit" Released: June 16, 2022; 2. "Betrayal" Released: July 13, 2022; 3. "Gnosis" Released: August 10, 2022

Gnosis is the eighth studio album by American post-metal band Russian Circles. It was released on August 19, 2022, through Sargent House.

== Background, production, and touring ==
Involved with previous releases from the band Kurt Ballou led in the production. The guitars were recorded at his God City studio in Massachusetts. The drums were recorded in Chicago's Electrical Audio, with Mike Sullivan and Brian Cook "playing live alongside drummers Dave Turncrantz's takes." Looping of guitar parts in combination with tapping to create different riffs and tones at the same time were used as songwriting techniques. Bassist and synth programmer Brian Cook stated in an interview during the writing period for Gnosis that, "Russian Circle's stuff tends to involve a lot of layering, whether that's me adding loops, or playing the Moog Taurus and the guitar part at the same time, or switching between instruments". Alternate guitar tunings were used including DADGAD which Sullivan learned from his Irish guitar studies. Although it was used in a modern rock context as introduced by Davey Graham in 1963.

Used extensively on the album for guitars but not used in live performance was the Boss Metal Zone featuring a "silicon-driven, two-stage-clipping circuit". Guitarist Mike Sullivan explained the reasons for its use saying "the Metal Zone is one of those pedals that, if you pair it with another gain pedal, it's super-useful. Utilizing a variety of distortion pedals and avoiding fuzz pedals on the album he further stated "there's no bad tone; it's just how you stack these tones together" and "Brian is so fuzzy that it's more advantageous for me to carve my own niche with distortion, and let the fuzz wrap around that." A live performance of songs from the album recorded at the Audiotree studio in Chicago was described as being "difficult to translate how loud this band actually is without standing directly in the room." The album was nominated for the Best Heavy Record category at the 2023 Libera Awards.

== Gear theft and recovery incident ==
A drastic shift in the bands overall sound and recording tones occurred in 2021 while on tour with System of a Down and Korn in between recording dates for the album at a stopover in Chowchilla, California when their equipment was stolen. In spite of this a review of their performance said "despite having just had $100,000 worth of gear stolen Sunday night from their U-Haul in Chowchilla, Russian Circles still showed up and played a 20-minute set filled with powerful instrumentation. They were reunited with most of it in 2024 excluding a Moog Taurus model 3 synth that had custom non-reproduceable from memory presets that was used to record tracks for the album. This was the result of a police investigation and an eventual drug bust resulting in the location of the missing instruments which were then held as evidence. The band used music equipment donated and borrowed from fellow musicians, instrument companies, and fan fund raising movements. This included amps from Hiwatt which became the touring rig consisting of two DR-103 heads, 4x12 cabinets, and a DR-50 combo amp. Discussing the purpose of the setup Sullivan said, "the two heads and cabs are stereo right and left and the combo is run with its own mic". Dunable Gnarwhal model guitars were provided by members of the Chelsea Wolfe band. Electrical Guitar Company built a replacement aluminium bass as previously used by Cook constructed with "available parts" that they had for use at the time.

== Promotion ==
The first single from the album for "Conduit" was released on June 16, 2022. The second single from the album was released on August 10, 2022, for "Betrayal". The band also released their first official music video for the title track "Gnosis" which was also simultaneously released as the third single on August 10, 2022. Directed by Joe Kell they wanted to create something with "cinematic footage of nature and humanity" with the goal to "compel viewers to rewatch the video and get something new from each viewing."

== Reception ==
Professional ratings
Review scores
Source	Rating
AllMusic	3.5/5 stars
Loud and Quiet	8/10
Pitchfork	7.5/10

The album received positive reviews including Metal Hammer noting the album beginning with songs of "massive riffs" and Kurt Ballous production in which the instruments were clearly heard individually. Pitchfork scoped out the track "Ó Braonáin" as a "100 second lullaby" and "guitar music for the gloaming". Sullivan shared in an interview that this was one of the tracks using the Celtic music influenced DADGAD tuning which would feature an "open, resonating string to be a reference note for the notes to either sound consonant, or dissonant, or rub in a gnarly way." The tuning features chord shapes that can be played in different positions while retaining open strings that provide drones that standard tunings do not have. They contrasted this with the track "Vlastimil" composed of a combination of Thrash metal and Black metal. This resulted from the band's first use of a B standard tuning.

AllMusic noted that the tracks were "more intense, visceral pieces, and Gnosis plays as a deliberately paced narrative rather than a fragmented patchwork" due to the band's changed composing routine of writing songs independently and bringing them to the others instead of the previous method of working on music together in a practice room. Visions showed the progression in songwriting from post-rock music featuring contrasting parts with the song "Conduit" which "whipped up a groove in just over four minutes that would make even the old Nu metal contemporaries green with envy." Guitar World also saw in "Conduit" a structure with a "blend of Mastodon-meets-old-school thrash riffs" that then turned into a mix of a post-metal and thrash soundscapes. This method was broken down into making some songs completely heavy or light which was described, "like coming into the eye of the storm and then pushing into the even heavier tracks." With the band later stating that "it was intentional to place "Ó Braonáin" immediately before one of the most aggressive songs on the record," and "that the song is mixed a little quieter too to make the following song, "Betrayal", feel even louder." On "Betrayal" Guitar World noted Sullivan's "metal and heavy Krautrock influences, as opposed to the Pink Floyd-spaciousness of previous releases."

The more pronounced Heavy metal music influence was noted by the Chicago Sun-Times on songs like "Gnosis" and "Betrayal" and with the album being composed entirely of instrumentals "encourages listeners to transcendentally home in on the feeling of the song. Not unlike a symphony or layered orchestra."

== Track listing ==
No.	Title	Length
1.	"Tupilak"	6:33
2.	"Conduit"	4:30
3.	"Gnosis"	7:47
4.	"Vlastimil"	6:43
5.	"Ó Braonáin"	1:45
6.	"Betrayal"	5:19
7.	"Bloom"	6:56
Total length:		39:39

== Personnel ==
Russian Circles

- Brian Cook – bass, baritone, synth
- Mike Sullivan – guitar
- Dave Turncrantz – drums

Technical

- Kurt Ballou – Engineer and Mixing
- Zach Weeks, Taylor Hales – Engineering
- Magnus Lindberg – Mastering
- Orion Landau – Design
- Artem Vladimirov – Photography

== Charts ==
Chart (2022)	Peak position
German Albums (Offizielle Top 100)	11
Scottish Albums (OCC)	57
UK Independent Albums (OCC)	17
UK Album Downloads (OCC)	24
UK Rock & Metal Albums (OCC)	6
Swiss Albums (Schweizer Hitparade)	33
