= Empros =

Studio album by Russian Circles
- Released: October 25, 2011
- Recorded: April 2011 at Phantom Manor in Chicago, Illinois
- Genre: Post-metal
- Length: 41:05
- Label: Sargent House
- Producer: Brandon Curtis

Russian Circles chronology
Geneva (2009)	Empros (2011)	Memorial (2013)

Empros is the fourth studio album by American post-metal band Russian Circles. The album was released on October 25, 2011 through Sargent House. This is Russian Circles' first album released solely through Sargent House; for their first three albums, Sargent House released limited edition vinyl copies, while CD and digital copies were handled by either Suicide Squeeze Records or Flameshovel Records.

== Background ==
Russian Circles began writing Empros in January 2011. In April 2011, the group entered Phantom Manor studios in Chicago, Illinois with producer Brandon Curtis of The Secret Machines and Interpol, who also previously produced the group's 2009 album Geneva. Bassist Brian Cook described the band's mindset for creating Empros as trying to "make the same ebb and flow of our live set happen on the record, with more constructive dynamics and dramatic bridging between songs." The album was also described in a press release from Sargent House as being Russian Circles' heaviest album to date.

On September 28, 2011 the song "Mládek" was made available for online streaming and free download. The title of the song was named after Tomáš Mládek, Russian Circles' European tour bus driver.

== Critical reception ==
Professional ratings
Aggregate scores
Source	Rating
Metacritic	86/100
Review scores
Source	Rating
AllMusic	4.5/5 stars
The A.V. Club	A−
CraveOnline	10/10
Drowned in Sound	8/10
MusicOMH	4/5 stars
Pitchfork	7.7/10
PopMatters	9/10
Rock Sound	9/10
The Skinny	4/5 stars
Spin	7/10

Empros was met with "universal acclaim" reviews from critics. At Metacritic, which assigns a weighted average rating out of 100 to reviews from mainstream publications, this release received an average score of 86 based on 14 reviews. In particular, many writers noted how refined the band's sound had become in its evolution. In his review for Spin, critic Christopher R. Weingarten wrote, "Though crunching at their heaviest, the band still shines brightest when they edge toward indie-rock approachability."

=== Accolade ===
Year	Publication	Country	Accolade	Rank
2011	Obscure Sound	United States	"Best Albums of 2011"	30

== Track listing ==
Empros track listing
No.	Title	Length
1.	"309"	8:50
2.	"Mládek"	7:40
3.	"Schiphol"	6:16
4.	"Atackla"	7:27
5.	"Batu"	6:17
6.	"Praise Be Man"	4:27
Total length:		41:05

Note

- On the digital version, "Batu" spans 10:06 with a drone transition.

== Personnel ==
Empros personnel adapted from AllMusic.

Russian Circles

- Brian Cook − bass guitar, vocals on "Praise Be Man"
- Mike Sullivan − guitar
- Dave Turncrantz − drums

Additional musicians

- Phil Karnats − accordion, cello

Production and recording

- Brandon Curtis − production, engineering, mixing
- Joe Lambert − mastering
- Mike Lust − engineering
- Russian Circles − production

Artwork and design

- Sonny Kay − album layout
- Dave Turncrantz − album photo

== Charts ==
Chart (2011)	Peak position
US Top Hard Rock Albums (Billboard)	18
US Heatseekers Albums (Billboard)	8
US Vinyl Albums (Billboard)	9
