= Back Street Crawler (band) =

1970s rock band

- Origin: England
- Genres: Blues rock, rock
- Years active: 1975–1976
- Labels: Atlantic Records
- Spinoffs: Crawler
- Spinoff of: Free
- Past members: Paul Kossoff; Terry Slesser; Terry Wilson; Tony Braunagel; Mike Montgomery; John Bundrick

Back Street Crawler were an English rock band formed in 1975 by ex-Free guitarist Paul Kossoff. They were signed to Atlantic Records (due to courtesy of Ahmet Ertegün) in 1975. The band took the name from Kossoff's solo album, Back Street Crawler. Terry Wilson, Mike Montgomery and Tony Braunagel had played together in the short-lived Bloontz, whose only album was released in 1973 and included versions of the Mike Montgomery songs, "Jason Blue" and "Long Way Down", both of which featured on Back Street Crawler's album The Band Plays On.

== History ==
The band's progress would continually be overshadowed by Kossoff's well-publicised drug dependency. His addiction to narcotics led to his eventual demise.

A headlining tour was conducted in the UK during May and June 1975, prior to finalising sessions for the album The Band Plays On. To push the album, a further series of live dates were announced. However, these shows were curtailed when Kossoff was hospitalised following a drug-related seizure. Whilst receiving treatment, Kossoff's condition worsened and he suffered a cardiac arrest. Four live concerts, in Liverpool, Glasgow, Newcastle and London, were undertaken in November.

Keyboard player Mike Montgomery quit the band shortly afterwards, to be replaced by John 'Rabbit' Bundrick for a series of American concerts in early 1976. Again, ill-health on Kossoff's part, including the guitarist breaking his fingers, resulted in numerous shows being cancelled.

The band set to work on their second album, working with producer Glyn Johns, in a variety of studios in New York and Los Angeles. With Kossoff still obviously ailing, session musician W.G. 'Snuffy' Walden committed much of the guitar to tape, Kossoff later playing lead over the mostly completed tracks. Walden also performed live, in the absence of Kossoff, with the band in February 1976. With Kossoff resuming his position, the band headlined four shows at the Starwood in West Hollywood. During the run of shows, Bad Company were performing at the Los Angeles Forum and they joined Back Street Crawler onstage for two nights. The final night of the engagement, on 3 March 1976, was to be the final performance of both Paul Kossoff and Back Street Crawler.

A British tour with AC/DC as support act was set to commence on 25 April 1976. However, on 19 March, Paul Kossoff died from cerebral and pulmonary edema on an overnight flight from Los Angeles to New York leading to the tour's cancellation. Following Kossoff's death, the band continued under the name of Crawler.

== Band members ==
=== Former members ===
- Paul Kossoff – lead guitar (1975–1976; died 1976)
- Terry Wilson-Slesser – lead vocals (1975–1976)
- Terry Wilson – bass (1975–1976)
- Tony Braunagel – drums (1975–1976)
- Mike Montgomery – keyboards (1975–1976)
- John Bundrick – keyboards (1976)

== Albums ==
- 1975 – The Band Plays On (Atlantic)
- 1976 – 2nd Street (Atlantic)
