= With These Hands (Alejandro Escovedo album) =

Studio album by Alejandro Escovedo
- Released: 1996
- Studio: The Hit Shack, Austin, Texas
- Genre: Rock
- Label: Rykodisc
- Producer: T.S. Bruton

Alejandro Escovedo chronology
Thirteen Years (1993)	With These Hands (1996)	More Miles Than Money: Live 1994–96 (1998)

With These Hands is the third album by the American roots rock musician Alejandro Escovedo, released in 1996. It was his only solo album for Rykodisc.

== Production ==
The album was produced by T.S. Bruton. "Tugboat" is a tribute to Sterling Morrison; Escovedo knew him from their days working at the University of Texas. Willie Nelson duets with Escovedo on "Nickel and a Spoon". The title track includes contributions from several Escovedos, including Alejandro's brother Pete and niece Sheila E. Jennifer Warnes sang backing vocals on "Pissed Off 2AM". Charlie Sexton also contributed to With These Hands.

== Critical reception ==
Professional ratings
Review scores
Source	Rating
AllMusic	4/5 stars
The Austin Chronicle	4/5 stars
Calgary Herald	4.5/5 stars
The Encyclopedia of Popular Music	4/5 stars
MusicHound Rock: The Essential Album Guide	3/5 stars
(The New) Rolling Stone Album Guide	3/5 stars
Uncut	1.5/5 stars
Vancouver Sun	5/5 stars

The Chicago Reader stated that Escovedo's "warm, slow-bubbling melodies are given alternately dense, sumptuous, and spare treatments that help the ballads flutter and the rockers rock." Trouser Press praised the duet with Nelson, labeling it "classical-folk balladry." Miami New Times called the album "a grim and sprawling masterpiece that weds his rough-hewn baritone with classic rock and roll riffs and the elegiac ambiance of vintage country weepers." The New York Times considered the album to be the best of Escovedo's first three, writing that it "doesn't try for comfort, but for stoic acceptance."

The Philadelphia Inquirer determined that Escovedo "employs a blunt rock attack softened by the calm, considered observations of a natural poet." Entertainment Weekly opined that the "multi-textured roots-pop ... would be utterly beguiling if it weren’t for his unresonant, plain-as-dough voice." The Calgary Herald declared that "Alejandro is on a roll, arguably the most original voice in America today, a man whose heart and soulful music aches with a sense of being that is a beauty, however bruised, to behold."

AllMusic wrote that, "if With These Hands doesn't break much new ground for him, it shows he's still in full command of his considerable gifts as a musician, and it's an impressive achievement." Reviewing the 2003 reissue, The Austin Chronicle called the album "dense with guests, guitars, and every musical spicing save for mortar and pestle." Uncut thought that "it’s a suitably raucous affair, though the full band tends to swamp Escovedo’s dusky timbre occasionally."

== Track listing ==
No.	Title	Length
1.	"Put You Down"
2.	"Slip"
3.	"Crooked Frame"
4.	"Pissed Off 2AM"
5.	"Nickel and a Spoon"
6.	"Little Bottles"
7.	"Sometimes"
8.	"Guilty"
9.	"Tired Skin"
10.	"With These Hands"
11.	"Tugboat"
