= Susan Voelz =

American musician

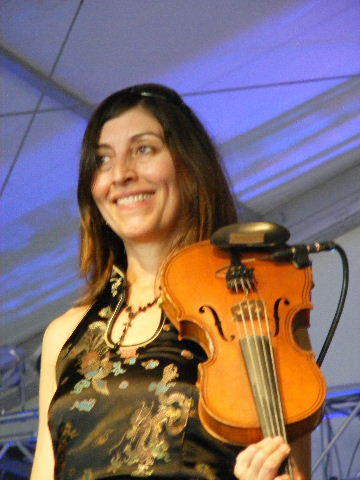
- Voelz performing with Poi Dog Pondering at the 2009 Austin City Limits Music Festival

Background information
- Born: Susana Maria Voelz
- Origin: Wauwatosa, Wisconsin, US
- Genres: Alternative rock
- Occupations: Violinist, composer, musical arranger, writer
- Instruments: Vocals, violin, guitar
- Labels: Texas Hotel Records/Columbia Premonition; Plate.tec.tonic
- Member of: Poi Dog Pondering
- Website: Official site

Susan Voelz (born Susana Maria Voelz) is an American musician. A Grammy Award-nominated vocalist, violinist, and composer. She is a member of the alternative rock band, Poi Dog Pondering. She has also worked with a long list of famous musicians.

She has worked on film scores for movie and television soundtracks. She has continued with her own solo career, she has released two albums, which have received positive reviews. As a writer, she has published a book with Billboard/Random House in 2007; The Musicians Guide to the Road.

== Biography ==
Voelz was born and raised in Wauwatosa, Wisconsin, in the United States. As a child, she discovered her grandfather's violin in the attic of the family home, and began to learn to play. Nurtured by family members who each played a variety of instruments, she frequently joined in playing in the family concerts in the living room, now saying in retrospect "We were cheerful and awful." Discovering in secondary school that the violin could be played in rock music and other genres of music opened up new possibilities, and encouraged her to continue practicing her craft. It was during this period that Voelz found a used acoustic guitar for $25 and learned to play it, although the violin never ceased to be her primary instrument.

After graduating high school, Voelz majored in English and in Music (Violin), graduating from Jacobs School of Music at Indiana University Bloomington. After relocating several times, she found herself living in what had become a college town with a thriving mecca for artists during that time: Austin, Texas. She began playing and performing with musicians she met there, including Ronnie Lane, who had relocated to Austin with former bandmate Ian McLagan, both of Small Faces/Faces fame. They performed in a short-term band dubbed the Seven Samurai. During this period, she found opportunities to perform as a backing musician with others on tour, including John Mellencamp and Alejandro Escovedo. Voelz was offered work by the Hawaiian band Poi Dog Pondering, who had relocated to Austin and were searching for a fiddler for their planned debut album. The combination clicked, and she has now contributed to 13 albums with the band.

Voelz has worked composing music and assembling film scores for movies, documentaries and educational tools. She composed the score for the Frontline television series The Lost Children of Rockdale County, which won the Peabody Award, as well as the follow-up Merchants of Cool. She also worked on projects for PBS educational documentaries.

Traveling as a sideman with a variety of musicians, working as a session musician in the studios, Voelz has performed with numerous famous performers, and continues to do so.

== Discography (selected) ==
=== Solo ===
- 1994 13 ribs |Voodoo/Dixiefrog Records (FRA)| Pravda Records (US)
- 1995 Summer Crashing
- 2016 Beautiful Life: Songs of Prince Re-imagined Octave8Records (US)

=== With Alejandro Escovedo ===
- 1994 Thirteen Years
- 1994 The End/Losing Your Touch
- 2005 Room of Songs
- 2006 The Boxing Mirror
- 2008 Real Animal Americana

=== With Grains of Faith ===
- 1988 Grains of Faith (cassette)

=== With Poi Dog Pondering (studio) ===
- 1989 Poi Dog Pondering Texas Hotel Records/Columbia
- 1990 Wishing Like a Mountain and Thinking Like the Sea
- 1992 Volo Volo
- 1995 Pomegranate
- 1999 Natural Thing
- 2003 In Seed Comes Fruit
- 2008 7

=== With Poi Dog Pondering (live) ===
- 1997 Liquid White Light
- 2000 Soul Sonic Orchestra
- 2012 Live at Metro Chicago (4 CDs, with 2 DVDs)

=== With Poi Dog Pondering (compilations) ===
- 2001 Sweeping Up the Cutting Room Floor
- 2005 The Best of Poi Dog Pondering (The Austin Years)

=== Collaborations ===
- 1989 Big Daddy with John Mellencamp
