= Eddie Quansah =

- Occupation: Musician
- Instrument: Trumpet
- Labels: Island Records, Essiebons, Polydor
- Formerly of: Afrodisiac, King Cobra, Stargazers Dance Band, The Black Star Band, The Black Star Sound, The Sons of the Jungle, Osibisa

Eddie Quansah is a prominent musician from Ghana. In addition to fronting and being a member of various musician ensembles, he has also worked as a session musician.

== Background ==
Eddie Quansah grew up in Kumasi, Ghana, the same town where Teddy Osei of Osibisa hailed from. When he was a toddler he expressed his early musician ability by playing on pots and pans. He later learnt how to play the bugle, then graduated to trumpet. As a teenager, he joined the Topspotters, who were one of the most popular highlife bands in town.

When he was 21, he relocated to London and found his townmate Teddy Osei who was forming Osibisa. He played with the group for a while before leaving to study at Eric Gilders Music School for the next three years.

He would join the ranks of Johnny Johnson and the Bandwagon. Later he heard that Johnny Nash was forming a band, and he did an audition for a role in the group. He got the job, and they recorded the hit "I Can See Clearly Now". He would also play on hit records by The Stargazers, Cat Stevens, Suzie Quatro, Toots and the Maytals, Bryan Ferry, The Reels and Bob Marley. He moved to Australia in the 1980s.

== Career ==
=== 1950s – 1960s ===
In the late 1950s, Quansah joined The Stargazers, replacing the ensemble's leader, Glen Cofie.

=== 1970s ===
Eddie Quansah was a member of the Sons of the Jungle band. In addition to himself, the lineup also included Ghanaian singer and percussionist, Willie Cheetham, and saxophonists George Lee and Peter Vanderpuije. They had the distinction of being the first Ghanaian to play at the Apollo Theater. It was 1972 and Johnny Nash had a gig there. They band played for thirty minutes before Nash came on stage.

In 1976, his Che Che Kulé album was released on the Island Record label. A single, "Che Che Kule" bw " Can I Come Back for More" was also released on the Island label.

In 1979, his My Star Will Shine album was released in Nigeria on the Polydor label. In the US it was released as Awo Awo on the Mango label. According to the 4 June 1979 issue of The Walrus, his record was getting moderate airplay at KFCR in Denver, Colorado. For the week of 16 July, the record was getting moderate airplay at WORT in Madison, Wisconsin. Awo Awo was reviewed in the September 1970 issue of High Fidelity. After talking about the genres of the album which ranged from disco and Latin to traditional, reviewer John Storm Roberts said that it was possibly the best album that he had come across that year.

=== 1980s – ===
In the 1980s, he led a band called King Cobra. Its line up included musicians from Yugoslavia, South Africa, Malta and Australia. The group released an album, Magic Rainbow on the RCA label in 1983.
