= Terry Slesser =

British singer-songwriter

- Genres: Blues rock, hard rock
- Occupations: Musician, songwriter
- Instrument: Vocals
- Years active: 1970s – present

Terry Slesser (also known as Terry Wilson-Slesser) is a blues rock singer from South Shields, England. He is chiefly known for his role as vocalist in ex-Free guitarist Paul Kossoff's band Back Street Crawler, renamed Crawler after Kossoff's death in 1976, and in Beckett.

== History ==
In the early 1970s, Slesser joined Beckett, replacing original singer Rob Turner, who had been killed in a car accident. Beckett released one self-titled album in 1974, produced by Roger Chapman of Family.

Slesser then joined Back Street Crawler and its successor, Crawler, until this disbanded in 1978. Following the demise of Crawler, Slesser joined the band Geordie in 1980, after its lead singer, Brian Johnson, joined AC/DC, subsequent to the death of Bon Scott.

In 1981, after the departure of Paul Di'Anno, Slesser unsuccessfully auditioned for the lead vocals in Iron Maiden – as mentioned by Steve Harris on the Iron Maiden The Early Days DVD.

In 1983, Slesser joined the band Charlie as lead vocalist. Slesser was featured on the band's US hit single "It's Inevitable", and the related album.

In 1984, Slesser toured Europe and Japan as an offstage backing vocalist with the Michael Schenker Group.

Slesser continues to tour as a solo act and in various band formations. For two years, he was the lead singer of Freeway, a British Free tribute band. With Freeway guitarist John Buckton, Slesser also formed Kossoff...The Band Plays On, a Paul Kossoff tribute band.

In 2026, Slesser had a fortnightly residence at 'Greens Tavern' in Sunderland, having performed weekly at a neighbouring pub, 'Vesta Tilley's'.
