= Alejandro Escovedo =

American musician (born 1951)

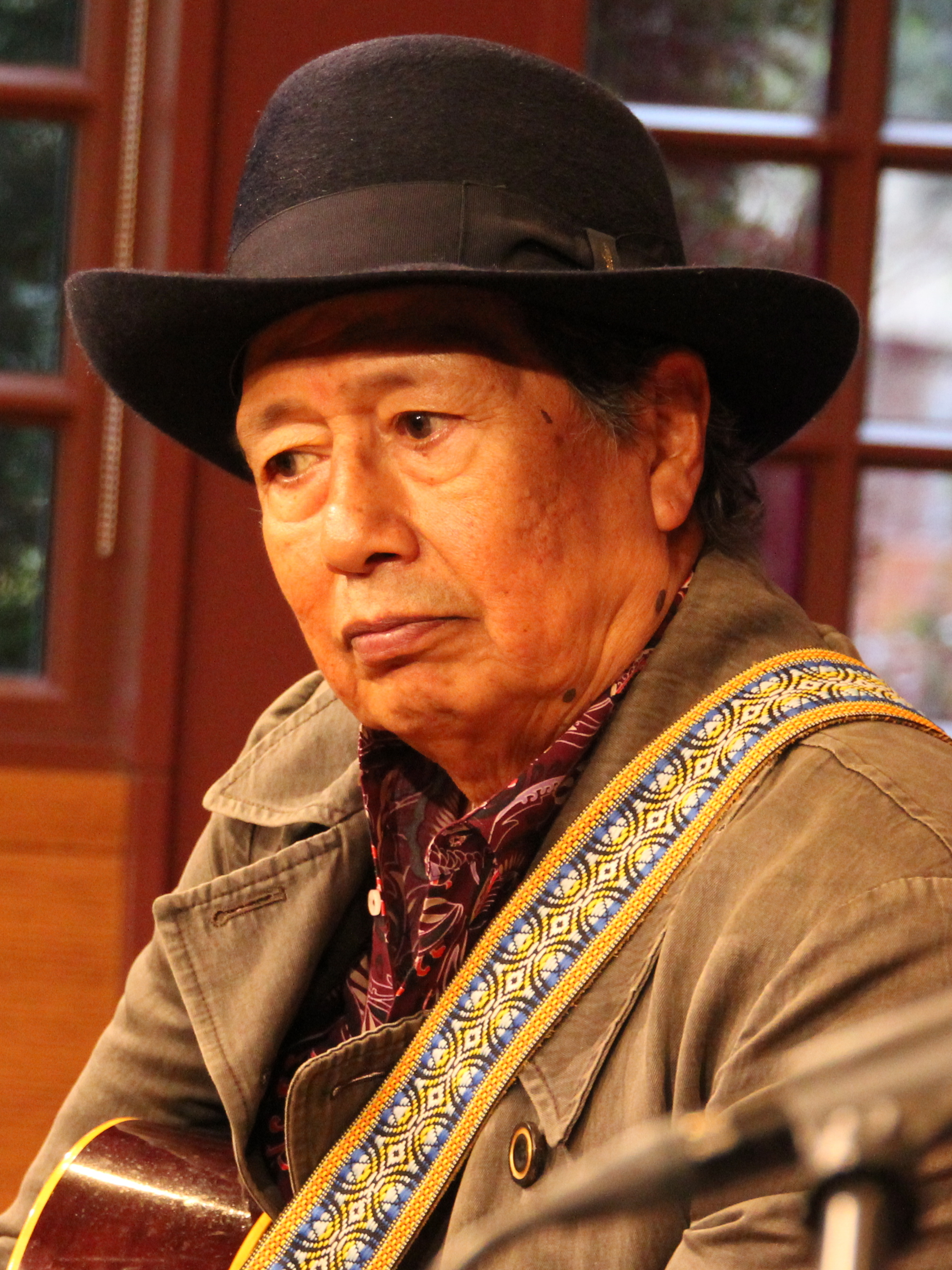
- Escovedo in 2024

Background information
- Born: January 10, 1951 (age 75); San Antonio, Texas, U.S.
- Genres: punk rock, alternative rock, cowpunk, chicano rock, rock
- Occupations: Musician, producer, singer, songwriter
- Instruments: Vocals, guitar
- Labels: Columbia, Vanguard, Birdman, Watermelon, Yep Roc, Bloodshot, Rykodisc
- Website: AlejandroEscovedo.com

Pedro Alejandro Escovedo (born January 10, 1951) is an American rock musician, songwriter, and singer, who has been recording and touring since the late 1970s. His primary instrument is the guitar. He has played in various rock genres, including punk rock, roots rock and alternative country, and is most closely associated with the music scene in Austin, Texas but also San Francisco and New York. He comes from a family of musicians.

== Biography ==
=== Early life ===
The son of a Mexican immigrant to Texas father and a Texas born mother, Escovedo is from a family that includes several professional musicians, including his brothers (and percussionists) Coke Escovedo and Pete Escovedo, and Sheila E. (Pete's daughter and Alejandro's niece). Alejandro's brother Mario fronted the hard rock band the Dragons, and another brother, Javier Escovedo, was in the punk rock band the Zeros.

=== Career ===
Escovedo began performing in the first-wave punk rock group the Nuns, with Jennifer Miro and Jeff Olener, in San Francisco, California. He moved to New York in 1978 and joined the Judy Nylon band. Escovedo lived in the Chelsea Hotel. In the 1980s Escovedo moved to Austin, Texas, where he adopted a roots rock/alternative country style in the band Rank and File (with Chip and Tony Kinman) and then started True Believers (with his brother Javier, Jon Dee Graham and the bass player Denny DeGorio).

Escovedo's first solo albums, Gravity and Thirteen Years, were released in 1992 and 1994, respectively. In 1997, Escovedo collaborated with Ryan Adams and the band Whiskeytown in recording sessions for their album Strangers Almanac. He sings on "Excuse Me While I Break My Own Heart Tonight", "Dancing with the Women at the Bar", and "Not Home Anymore". Whiskeytown also covered the True Believers song, "The Rain Won't Help You When It's Over," written by Escovedo, on the re-released Strangers Almanac (deluxe edition).

In 1998 No Depression magazine named him Artist of the Decade. Escovedo was also involved in a side project with Buick MacKane, who released the album The Pawn Shop Years in 1997. In 1999, Escovedo contributed to a tribute album to Skip Spence, a co-founder of Moby Grape. The album, More Oar: A Tribute to the Skip Spence Album (Birdman Records, 1999), was intended to raise funds to address Spence's medical bills from cancer. On More Oar, Escovedo performed a rendition of Spence's "Diana". The critic Rob Brunner commented, "The best contributions come from artists who realize that Spence's work is as much about atmosphere as words and chords. ...Alejandro Escovedo offers an appropriately bleary 'Diana', Spence's darkest song."

The album Boxing Mirror came out on May 2, 2006, and included many of the songs he had promoted with the Alejandro Escovedo String Quintet. Escovedo went on a short tour with the Quintet, which included a date at Carnegie Hall's Zankel Hall in early December 2006. In April 2008, Escovedo changed managers, hiring managers Jon Landau and Barbara Carr. Later that year, he released Real Animal, produced by Tony Visconti and co-written with Chuck Prophet. In 2009, Escovedo was invited to contribute to a tribute album to the late Doug Sahm, recording a version of "Too Little Too Late" to Keep Your Soul: A Tribute to Doug Sahm (Vanguard Records).

In June 2010, Escovedo released Street Songs of Love, also produced by Visconti but released on a new label, featuring songs that were originally presented during "Sessions on South Congress" at the Continental Club in Austin, Texas with his band, The Sensitive Boys. According to Escovedo, the record “ended up being an album about different types of love, the pursuit of a feeling that is forever elusive, mysterious, and addictive.” A New York Times "critic's choice" review of Street Songs of Love stated, "In another, less fragmented pop era, this would be the album of thoughtful but radio-ready love songs to finally get Mr. Escovedo the big national audience he deserves." The album received airtime on radio shows such as Little Steven Van Zandt's Underground Garage, continuing to play the song "Silver Cloud" into the following year.

In 2014, Escovedo appeared in the movie and contributed to the soundtrack of the movie Veronica Mars, singing an acoustic version of "We Used to Be Friends". Also that year, he co-produced and co-hosted the SXSW Tribute to Lou Reed with Richard Barone.

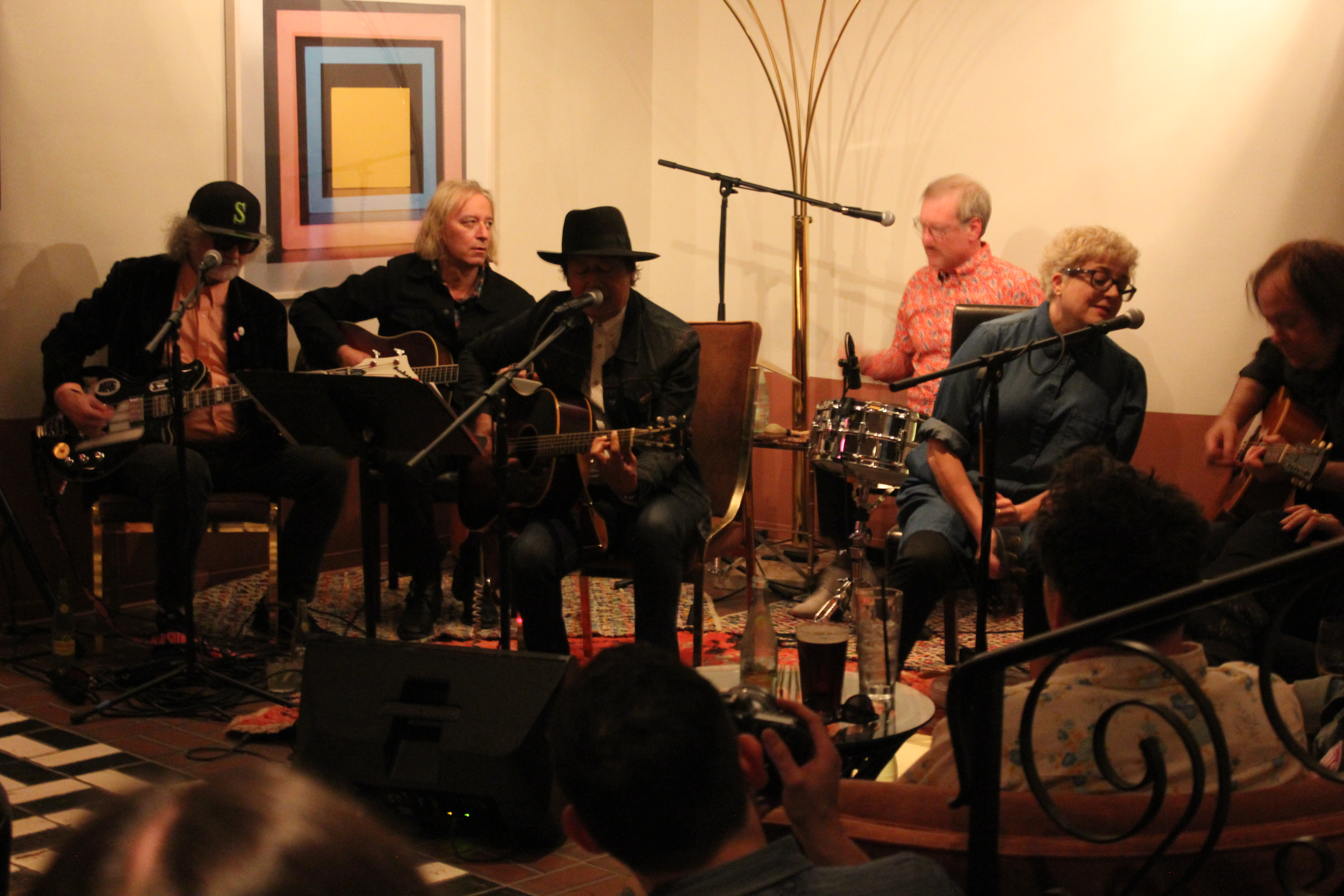
Escovedo (seated in center, wearing a Stetson), backed by (from left to right): Scott McCaughey, Peter Buck, John Moen, Kelly Hogan, and Kurt Bloch in 2017

In October 2016, Escovedo released the album Burn Something Beautiful, which had been recorded in April of that year in Portland, Oregon. In January 2017, he did a short tour supporting the album, backed by some of the members of The Minus Five Scott McCaughey, Peter Buck, Kurt Bloch and John Moen, all of whom had performed on the album. All songs on Burn Something Beautiful were written by Escovedo, McCaughey, and Buck.

In 2017 Escovedo recorded "The Crossing" in Villafranca, Italy at Cosabeat, he co-wrote with Don Antonio band. The band Don Antonio and Escovedo toured the US and Europe extensively. The New Yorker magazine wrote a feature article on Escovedo published October 2018 by Nick Paumgarten. Escovedo received the Townes Van Zandt Songwriting Award at the 37th annual Austin Music Awards in 2019. Also in 2019 Escovedo recorded "La Cruzada". Translating his 2018 "The Crossing" into Spanish lyrics sung by Alex Ruiz. Escovedo received the Independent Icon Award at the 2020 A2IM Libera Awards. Escovedo was honored to be inducted into the Austin City Limits Hall of Fame in 2021. In 2023 Escovedo was inducted into the Texas Heritage Songwriters Hall of Fame.

Escovedo is in the works of his memoir, a screenplay and more music to follow.

=== Personal life ===
In 2003, after having lived with Hepatitis C for many years, Escovedo collapsed onstage in Arizona as a result of the disease. Escovedo lacked health insurance and several musicians performed benefit concerts to assist with his medical bills. They also released the album Por Vida: A Tribute to the Songs of Alejandro Escovedo. The proceeds of the two-disc set went to the Alejandro Escovedo Medical and Living Expense Fund. Contributing musicians included John Cale, Lucinda Williams, Ian Hunter, Jennifer Warnes, Steve Earle, the Jayhawks, Bob Neuwirth, Son Volt, and Escovedo's brother Pete Escovedo with Pete's daughter, Sheila E., Javier, and Mario (as a member of the Dragons).

In 2005, media reports on George W. Bush's iPod playlist included Escovedo's song "Castanets" In response, Escovedo announced that he would not play the song again as long it was on Bush's iPod or until he was out of office. After two years, as Bush was nearing the end of his term, Escovedo lifted the moratorium and began performing the song again.

Escovedo was cured of Hepatitis C in 2015.

== Discography ==
=== Albums ===
- Gravity (1992)
- Thirteen Years (1993)
- The End/Losing Your Touch (Maxi, 1994)
- With These Hands (1996)
- The Pawn Shop Years, with Buick MacKane (1997)
- More Miles Than Money: Live 1994-1996 (1998)
- Bourbonitis Blues (1999)
- A Man Under the Influence (2001)
- By the Hand of the Father (2002)
- Room of Songs: Recorded live at the Cactus Cafe in Austin, TX on February 28 and March 1, 2005 (2005)
- The Boxing Mirror (2006)
- Real Animal (2008)
- Live Animal: Live EP (2009)
- Street Songs of Love (2010)
- Big Station (2012)
- Burn Something Beautiful (2016)
- The Crossing (2018)
- La Cruzada : Record Store Day version Vinyl (2020) (Re-recording of 2018 album The Crossing, sung in Spanish with all liner notes translated to Spanish)
- La Cruzada (2021) (Full release of CD and Vinyl)
- Echo Dancing (2024)

=== Other contributions ===
- More Oar: A Tribute to the Skip Spence Album (Birdman, 1999)
- Hear Music Volume 7: Waking (2002, Hear Music) – "Wave"
- 107.1 KGSR Radio Austin – Broadcasts Vol. 10 (2002) – "Ballad of the Sun & the Moon"
- WYEP Live and Direct: Volume 4 – On Air Performances (2002) – "Rosalie"
- Keep Your Soul: A Tribute to Doug Sahm (Vanguard, 2009)
- Metro: The Official Bootleg Series, Volume 1 2010
- Uncut Starman - A Tribute CD featuring various artists covering 18 songs of David Bowie (Uncut Magazine, 2003) - "All The Young Dudes"
- You Don't Know Me - Rediscovering Eddy Arnold (Plowboy Records, 2013)- "It's A Sin"
- «From death to Texas» The task has overwhelmed us, the Jeffrey Lee Pierce sessions project (Gliterhouse Records, 2023)

== Awards ==
- AMA Lifetime Achievement Award for Performing, 2006
- 37th annual Austin Music Awards Townes Van Zandt Songwriting Award, 2019
- A2IM Libera Awards Independent Icon, 2020
- Austin City Limits Hall of Fame Inductee, 2021
- Texas Heritage Songwriters Hall of Fame Inductee, 2023

Awards
| Preceded by Marty Stuart | AMA Lifetime Achievement Award for Performing; 2006 | Succeeded by Joe Ely |
