= Cry No More =

Cry No More may refer to:

- Cry No More, band of Chas Cronk
- Cry No More, album by Cry No More (1987)
- Cry No More, album by Danielle Nicole, 2018
- "Cry No More" (Shareefa song), 2006
- "Cry No More" (Mika Nakashima song), 2006
- "Cry No More" (Yaakov Shwekey song)
- "Cry No More", song by The Outlaws from self-titled LP
- "Cry No More", song by G Herbo from the album, 25
