= Samantha Fish =

American blues guitarist and singer-songwriter (born 1989)

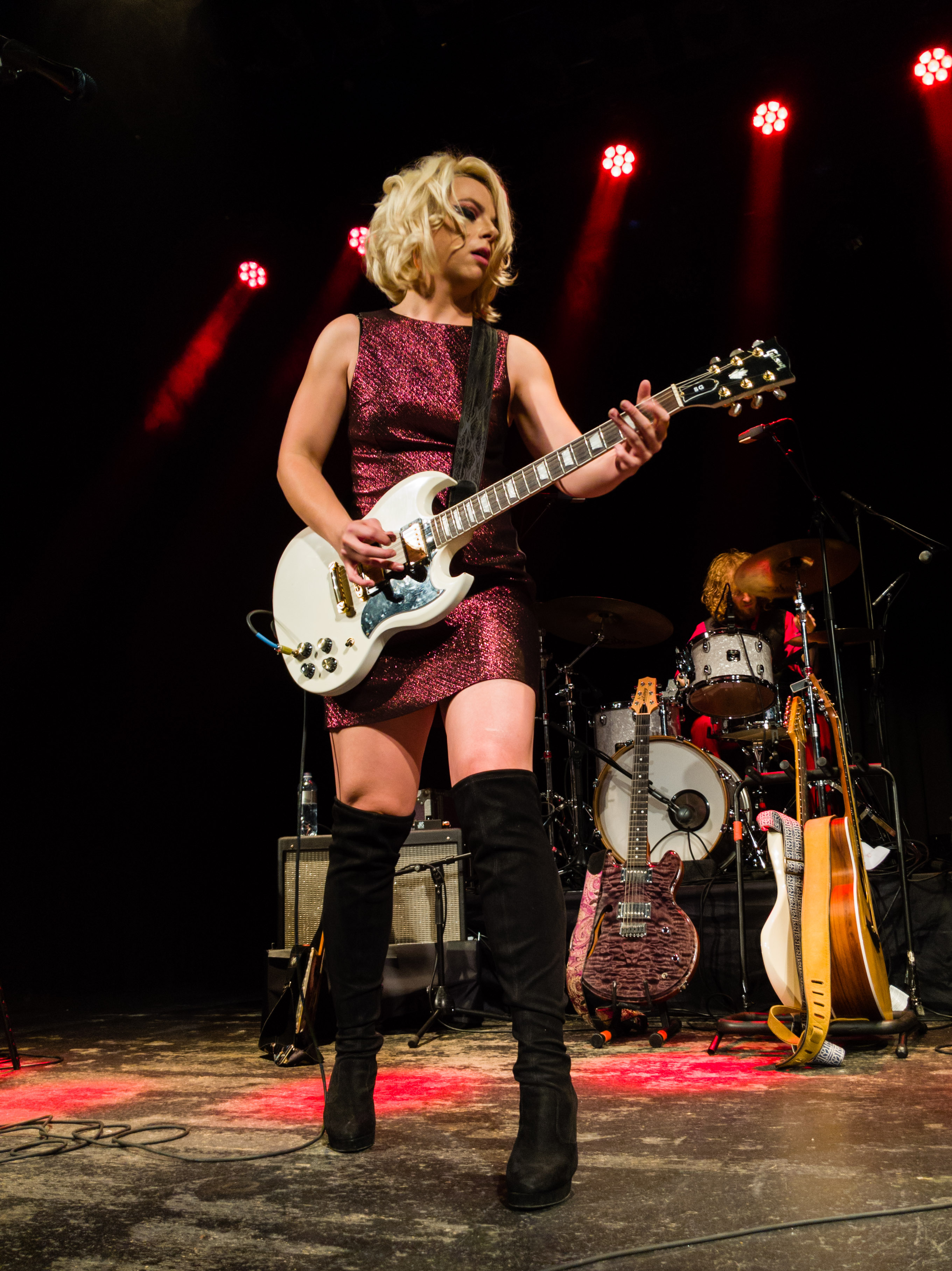
- Fish performing in Zürich, 2019

Background information
- Born: January 30, 1989 (age 37); Kansas City, Missouri, U.S.
- Genres: Blues rock; roots rock; blues
- Occupations: Singer-songwriter; guitarist
- Instruments: Guitar; vocals
- Years active: 2009–present
- Labels: Ruf; Rounder
- Website: www.samanthafish.com

Samantha Fish (born January 30, 1989) is an American guitarist and singer-songwriter from Kansas City, Missouri. While she is often cited as a blues artist, Fish's work features and draws from multiple genres, including rock, country, funk, bluegrass, and ballads.

Among other awards, she has received two Grammy Best Contemporary Blues Album nominations, for her 2023 collaboration with Jesse Dayton titled Death Wish Blues and for her 2025 album Paper Doll.

== Early life and education ==
Fish grew up in the Kansas City area. She started out playing the drums, but switched to guitar when she was 15. Fish's mother was the instructor in a local church choir, and her father played guitar with friends. Initially hearing recordings of Bonnie Raitt and Stevie Ray Vaughan, she later heard music from Tom Petty and the Rolling Stones and cites the Stones' album Sticky Fingers as an early influence. She and her sister were both drawn towards blues music in their teenage years.

Fish regularly went to the Knuckleheads Saloon to hear touring blues artists. After turning 18, she often joined in with the singers and bands who were performing there.

== Career ==
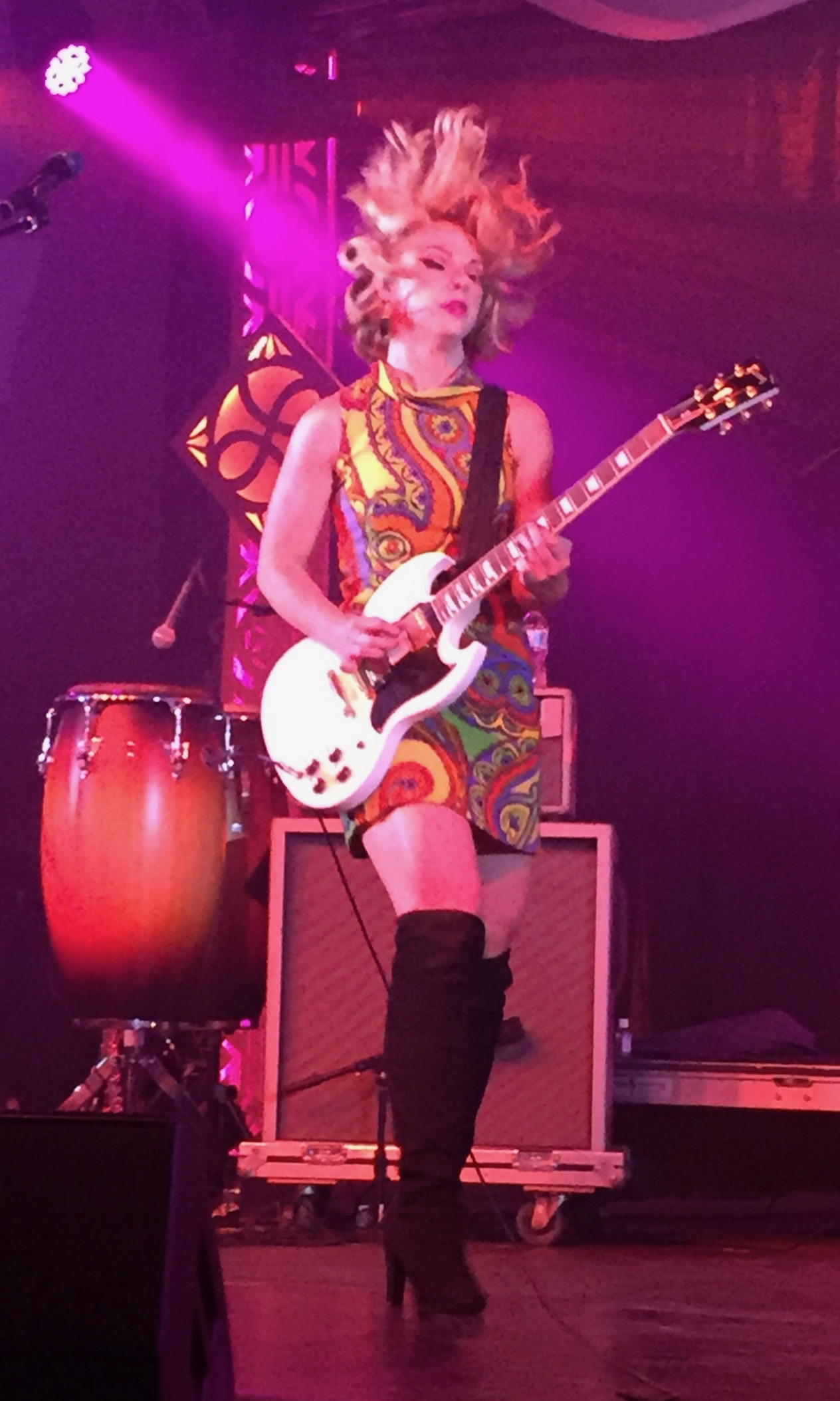
Fish at LEAF in Black Mountain, North Carolina, May 2018

In 2009, Fish recorded and produced Live Bait. The live album attracted the attention of a talent company, who recommended her to Ruf Records. Ruf Records put together a record with Fish and two other female blues artists, Cassie Taylor and Dani Wilde, titled Girls with Guitars. The three guitarists then toured on the Ruf Records 2011 Blues Caravan in the U.S. and Europe.

Fish continued touring with the Samantha Fish Band, featuring "Go-Go Ray" Pollard on drums and Chris Alexander on bass, playing in Europe and the United States. In 2011, Fish recorded Runaway with the help of her mentor Mike Zito. The album won the 2012 Blues Music Award for Best New Artist.

Fish appeared on Devon Allman's 2013 album Turquoise in a duet covering the Tom Petty/Stevie Nicks' song "Stop Draggin' My Heart Around". During the summer of 2013, Fish was called up on stage to play with a skeptical Buddy Guy who was so impressed with her playing on the guitar, he declared with a beaming smile to his audience, "When this kind of shit happens, I'll play all night!"

In 2013, Fish released her second major studio album, Black Wind Howlin', featuring Mike Zito on guitar, Yonrico Scott on drums, Johnny Sansone on harmonica, and Paul Thorn, vocal duet on one track. The album was recorded in Dockside Studios, in Maurice, Louisiana. Zito's bandmates from his group Royal Southern Brotherhood, Yonrico Scott and Charlie Wooton, were brought in to assist in the session recordings. Also in 2013, Fish appeared on The Healers Live at Knuckleheads Saloon, producing a CD/DVD collaboration with Jimmy Hall, Reese Wynans, Kate Moss, and Danielle and Kris Schnebelen (sister and brother, formerly of the band Trampled Under Foot). Proceeds benefit the Blue Star Connection. The Healers occasionally perform together as their schedule permits.

Fish's third studio album, Wild Heart, was released on July 10, 2015. The album is more roots rock than her earlier blues rock. Fish wrote five songs on the record. She co-wrote five other songs with Jim McCormick in Nashville, Tennessee. Luther Dickinson produced the album, as well as played various stringed instruments (guitar, bass, mandolin, lap steel) to flesh out the sound. The album was recorded in four studios, Royal Studios and Ardent Studios in Memphis, Tennessee, Zebra Ranch in Coldwater, Mississippi, and Blade Studios in Shreveport, Louisiana. Other musicians on the record are Brady Blade (drums), Lightnin' Malcolm (guitar), Shardé Thomas (drums), Dominic Davis (bass), Shontelle Norman-Beatty (background vocals), and Risse Norman (background vocals).

Fish released her fourth solo album, Chills & Fever on March 17, 2017. The album was recorded in Detroit and was recorded with members of the band The Detroit Cobras. Bobby Harlow produced the album. Belle of the West followed in December 2017.

Fish released her sixth solo album, Kill or Be Kind, on September 20, 2019, on her new label, Rounder Records. It was chosen as a 'Favorite Blues Album' by AllMusic.

Fish released her seventh solo album, Faster, on September 10, 2021, on Rounder Records. The album was produced by Martin Kierszenbaum, and features drummer Josh Freese and bass player Diego Navaira of The Last Bandoleros. Kansas City area rapper Tech N9ne is featured on the song "Loud".

In 2022, Fish was featured in the documentary short Love Letters: Samantha Fish Live From New Orleans presented by Carl Van Productions in association with Very Productive Pictures and WYES-TV, airing in both 2022 and 2023.

In May 2023, Fish released the collaborative album Death Wish Blues (Rounder Records) with Jesse Dayton, and the pair set forth on an extensive tour schedule throughout the US, UK, and Europe. Supporting them on the UK leg of their tour was Canadian roots rock band The Commoners. Death Wish Blues was nominated for Best Contemporary Blues Album at the 2024 Grammy Awards.

Her ninth solo album, Paper Doll, was released in April 2025. It garnered Fish a 2026 Grammy Award nomination for Best Contemporary Blues Album. She released a live album, Paper Doll (Live), in October 2026 which has been nominated for a 2027 Grammy Award in the same category.

== Personal life ==
Her older sister, Amanda Fish, is a singer-songwriter who has recorded for VizzTone Records.

== Discography ==
=== Albums ===
Title	Year	Artist	Label	Producer
Live Bait	2009	The Samantha Fish Blues Band	Samantha Fish Productions	Steve McBride
Girls with Guitars	2011	Samantha Fish / Cassie Taylor / Dani Wilde	Ruf	Mike Zito
Runaway	2011	Samantha Fish	Ruf	Mike Zito
Girls with Guitars Live (CD/DVD)	2012	Samantha Fish / Dani Wilde / Victoria Smith	Ruf	Uwe Treskatis, Thomas Ruf
Black Wind Howlin'	2013	Samantha Fish	Ruf	Mike Zito
The Healers (CD/DVD)	2013	Jimmy Hall / Reese Wynans / Samantha Fish / Kate Moss / Danielle Schnebelen / Kris Schnebelen	Blue Star Connection	Stellar Press
Wild Heart	2015	Samantha Fish	Ruf	Luther Dickinson
Chills & Fever	2017	Samantha Fish	Ruf	Bobby Harlow
Belle of the West	2017	Samantha Fish	Ruf	Luther Dickinson
Kill or Be Kind	2019	Samantha Fish	Rounder	Scott Billington
Faster	2021	Samantha Fish	Rounder	Martin Kierszenbaum
Death Wish Blues	2023	Samantha Fish / Jesse Dayton	Rounder	Jon Spencer
Paper Doll	2025	Samantha Fish	Rounder	Bobby Harlow
Paper Doll Live	2026	Samantha Fish	Rounder	Michelle Aquilato

== Awards ==
=== Blues Blast Music Awards ===
Year	Category	Nominated work	Result	Ref.
2017	Contemporary Blues Album	Chills & Fever	Won	

=== Blues Music Award ===
Year	Category	Nominated work	Result	Ref.
2018	Contemporary Blues Female Artist of the Year		Won	

=== Grammy Awards ===
Year	Category	Nominated work	Result	Ref.
2024	Best Contemporary Blues Album	Death Wish Blues	Nominated	
2026	Best Contemporary Blues Album	Paper Doll	Nominated	
2027	Best Contemporary Blues Album	Paper Doll (Live)	Pending	

=== Independent Blues Awards ===
Year	Category	Nominated work	Result	Ref.
2016	Artist of the Year		Won	
2016	Best Independent Blues Contemporary CD	Wild Heart	Won	
2016	Best Independent Female Blues Artist		Won	
2016	Road Warrior Award		Won	
2016	Best Modern Roots Song	"Go Home"	Won	
2017	Best Independent Female Blues Artist		Won	
2017	Road Warrior Award		Won	
2018	Best Modern Roots CD	Belle of the West	Won	
2018	Best Independent Female Blues Artist		Nominated	
2018	Best Independent Blues-Soul Artist		Won	
2018	Independent Blues Artist Gateway Award		Nominated	
2018	Best Independent Blues Stage Performance		Won	
2018	Road Warrior Award		Won	
2018	Best Contemporary Blues Song	"Don't Say You Love Me"	Nominated	
2018	Best Song for the Common Good	"American Dream"	Won	
2020	Artist of the Year		Won	
2020	Best Independent Female Blues Artist		Won	
2020	Independent Blues-Soul Artist		Won	
2020	Best Independent Blues R&B/Soul CD	Kill or Be Kind	Won	
2020	Best Modern Roots Song	"Kill or Be Kind"	Won	
2020	Best Music Video	"Kill or Be Kind"	Nominated	
2020	Best Music Engineer/Producer		Won	
2020	Independent Blues Artist Gateway Award		Won	
2020	Road Warrior Award		Won	
2021	Gateway Artist		Won	
2022	Best Music Video	"Twisted Ambition"	Won	

=== Living Blues Awards ===
Year	Category	Nominated work	Result	Ref.
2018	Readers' Poll: Blues Artist of the Year (Female)		Won	

=== OffBeat's Best of the Beat Awards ===
Year	Category	Nominated work	Result	Ref.
2017	Best Blues Band or Performer		Won	
2017	Best Blues Album	Belle of the West	Won	
2018	Artist of the Year		Won	
2018	Best Blues Band or Performer		Won	
2018	Best Female Vocalist		Won	
2018	Best Guitarist		Won	
2019	Best Blues Band or Performer		Won	
2019	Best Blues Album	Kill or Be Kind	Won	
2019	Best Guitarist		Won	
2023	Best Blues Artist		Won	
2023	Best Guitarist		Won	
2023	Best Music Video	"Deathwish" (with Jesse Dayton)	Won	
2023	Best Blues Album	Deathwish (with Jesse Dayton)	Won	

=== Charts ===
- Black Wind Howlin'
  - Top Heatseekers at No. 47 (2013)
  - Top Blues Albums at No. 7 (2013, 2014)
- Wild Heart
  - Top Heatseekers at No. 14 (2015)
  - Top Blues Albums at No. 1 (2015)
- Chills & Fever
  - Top Heatseekers at No. 7 (2017)
  - Top Blues Albums at No. 3 (2017)
- Belle of the West
  - Top Heatseekers at No. 2 (2017)
  - Top Blues Albums at No. 1 (2017)
- Kill or Be Kind
  - Top Heatseekers at No. 1 (2019)
  - Top Blues Albums at No. 1 (2019)
- Faster
  - Top Heatseekers at No. 18 (2021)
  - Top Blues Albums at No. 1 (2021)
