= Brandon Miller (musician) =

American musician (born 1990)

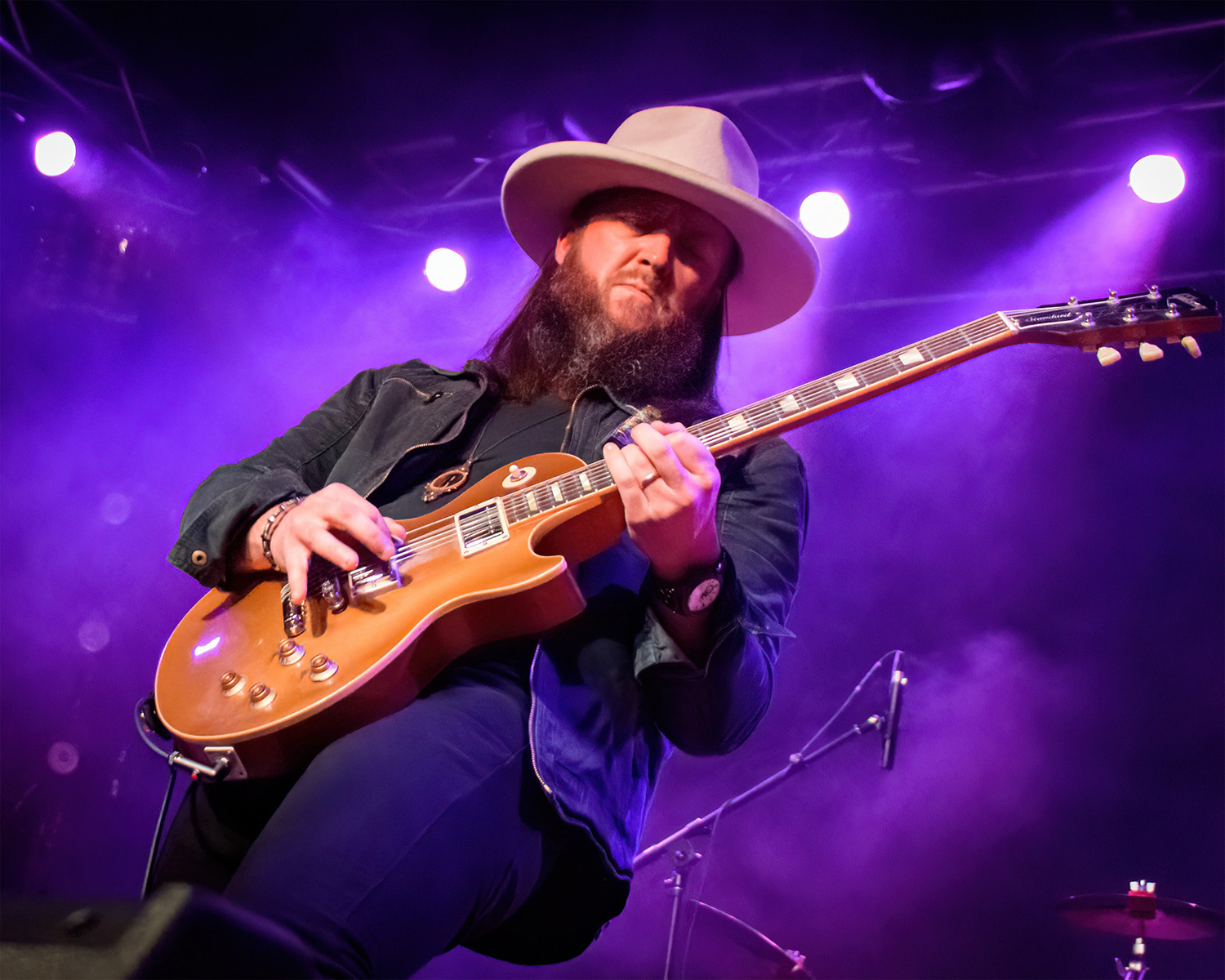

Background information
- Born: April 8, 1990 (age 36); Gardner, Kansas, U.S.
- Genres: Blues, Americana, rock
- Occupations: Musician, songwriter, performer
- Instruments: Guitar, mandolin
- Years active: 2005–present
- Website: brandonmillerkc.com

Brandon Miller (born April 8, 1990) is an American singer-songwriter, guitarist. He was part of several cover bands in the Kansas City, Missouri area, would ultimately front the Brandon Miller Band and become a founding member of the Danielle Nicole Band with Danielle Nicole, featured as a lead guitarist and vocalist.

== Biography ==
Miller was born in Gardner, Kansas, United States. After performing vocals and guitars with several local cover bands, Miller formed the Brandon Miller Band to record and promote his solo projects: Slow Train and Brandon Miller Band – Live at Knuckleheads. He then joined with the Danielle Nicole Band, singing and playing on both her albums, Live at The Gospel Lounge and her Concord Records release, Cry No More. Miller toured in support of Cry No More internationally at venues such as the Fourth Annual Utah Blues Festival in June 2018, the International Blues Festival in Canada in July 2018, the Chenago Blues Festival in 2019 and in Lake Tahoe, Nevada. Cry No More was nominated for a Grammy Award, received the Independent Blues Award for best contemporary CD in Blues Blast Magazine in 2018 and in 2019 garnished three additional Independent Blues Awards. His Live at Knuckleheads Release garnished a nomination for Best Independent Blues Live CD in 2019.

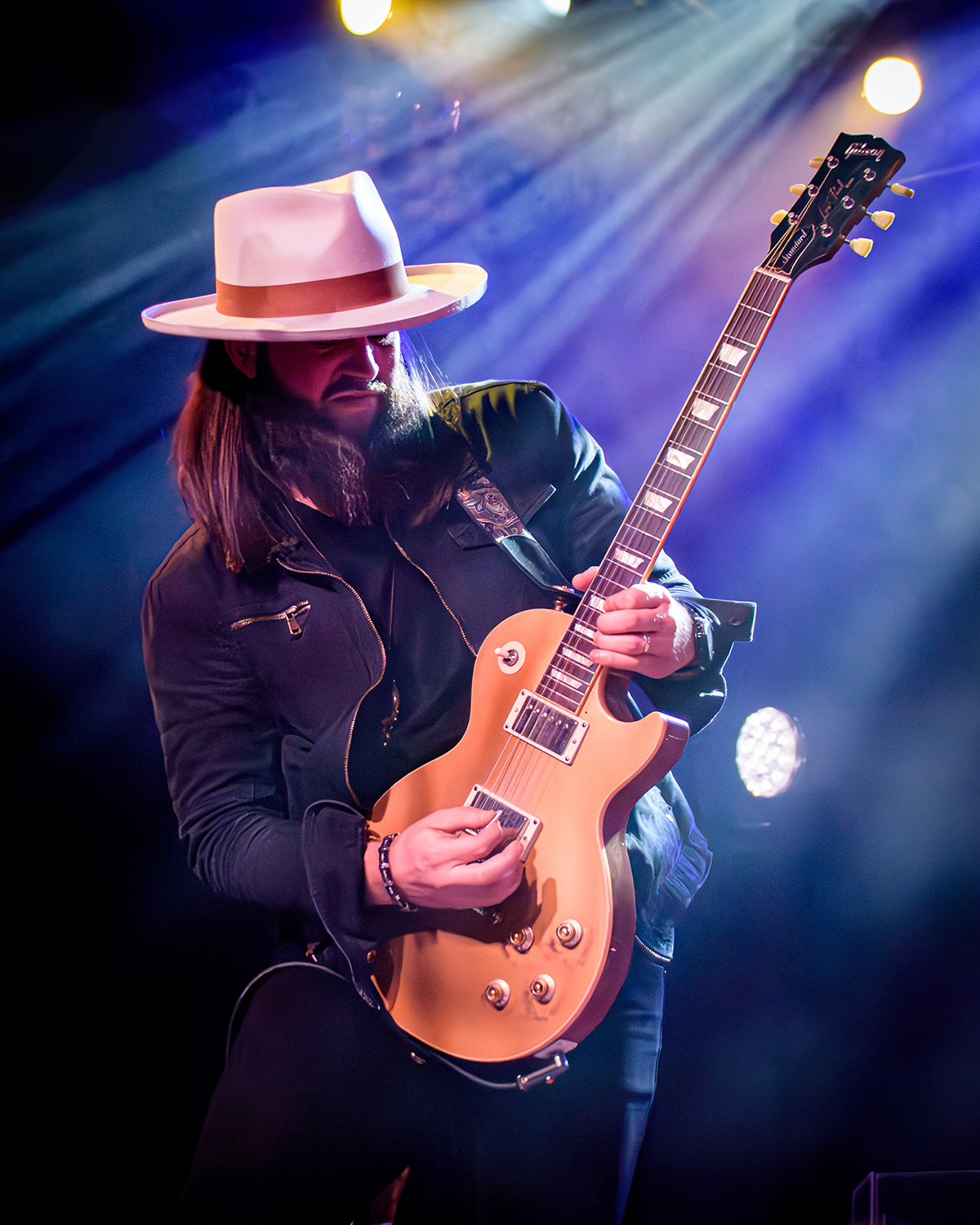
BrandonMiller at Knuckleheads 2023

Miller performed with many other blues artists such as Monster Mike Welch and Mike Ledbetter and participated in the tribute and fundraiser to Ledbetter after his death. The Brandon Miller Band between 2017 and 2019 opened for the blues musician Walter Trout at both Knuckleheads, where Eric Gales was also on the bill, and in Omaha, Nebraska, among other venues.

Virtue And Vice, since its release in 2020, has been reviewed by both in Blues Blast Magazine and Blues Rock Review, where the release was considered for an award as a top blues album of 2020.

As tour dates in support of Virtue and Vice began, including a performance at The Bitter End in New York City, Miller was featured in the Lake Champlain Weekly, "All About The Guitar".

Brandon Miller received the Readers Choice Award by Kansas City Magazine for best musician of 2022.

In 2023, he continued touring in the United States and Europe with the Danielle Nicole Band and the Brandon Miller Band, along with releasing a live compilation of his tunes, Bad Situation - Live in Kansas City.

On Danielle Nicole's 2024 release on Forty Below Records, The Love You Bleed, Miller was featured as a co-writer on multiple tracks and musician on all the tracks.

The Brandon Miller Band featured Brandon Miller - guitar/vocals, Dylan Reiter - bass/backing vocals; and Pat Adams - drums; with special guest Tyson Leslie - keys, rhythm guitar/backing vocals, at Knuckleheads, performing a 50th anniversary tribute of the Peter Frampton Release "Frampton Comes Alive!" on August 14, 2026. The night also included a 50th commemoration of Bob Seger's "Live Bullet" album featuring Curt Coolidge and his band.

Brandon Miller Band 2026

Danielle Nicole’s August 28, 2026 release “Fireflies” featured Miller on all the tracks as a vocalist and guitarist. He was also a co-writer on eight of the eleven tracks including the 3 previously released singles and the title track, “Fireflies.”

== Discography ==
- Last Goodbye - Brandon Miller Band (2011)
- Slow Train – Brandon Miller Band (2014)
- Live at Knuckleheads – Brandon Miller Band (2017)
- Live at The Gospel Lounge – Danielle Nicole Band (2017)
- Cry No More – Danielle Nicole (2018)
- Virtue and Vice – Brandon Miller (2020)
- Bad Situation - Live in Kansas City - Brandon Miller (2023)
- The Love You Bleed - Danielle Nicole (2024)
- Fireflies - Danielle Nicole (2026)
