= Knuckleheads Saloon =

Music venue in Kansas City, Missouri, United States

- Knuckleheads
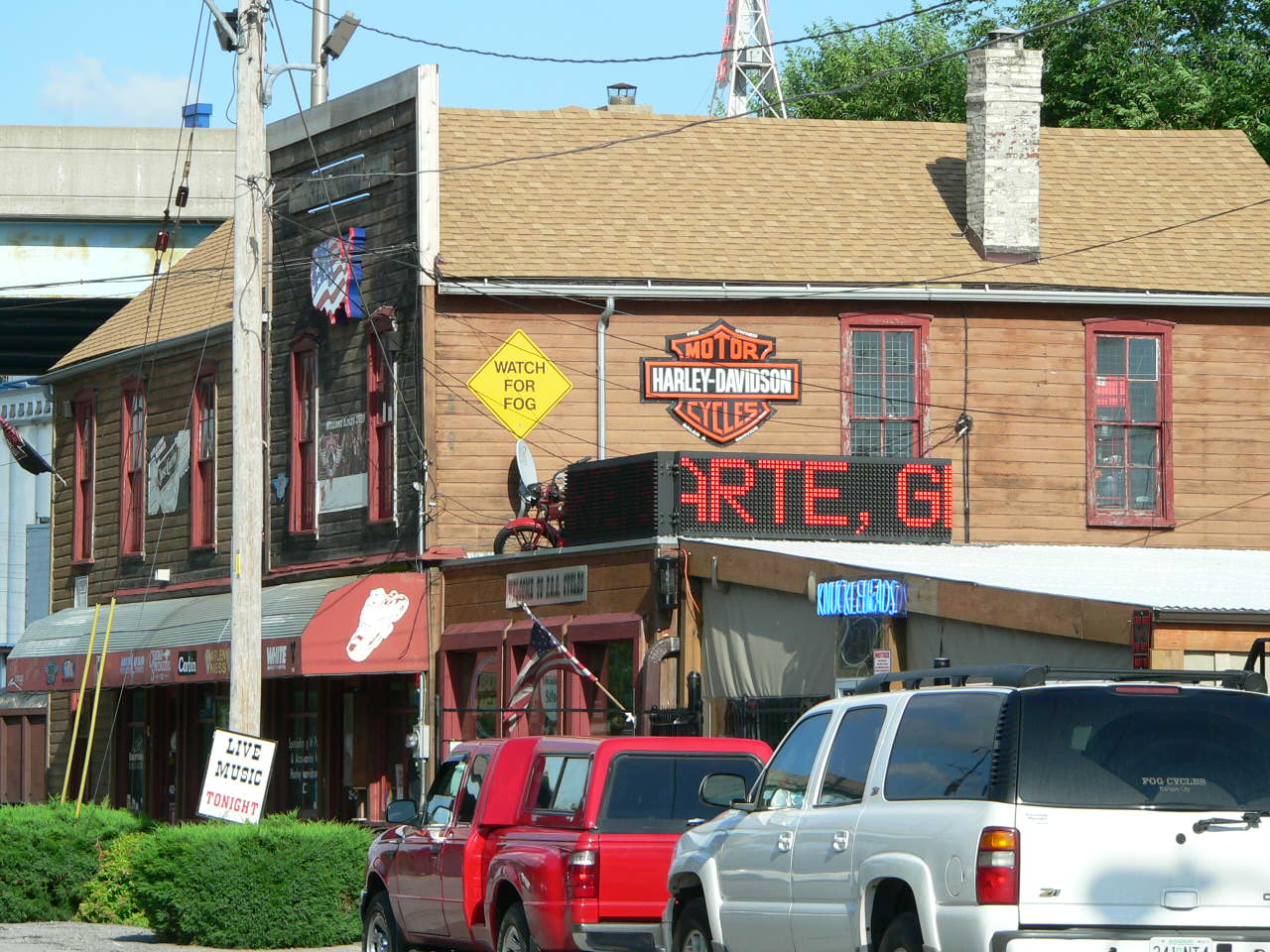
- Knuckleheads Saloon - East Bottoms
- Interactive map of Knuckleheads Saloon
- Location: 2715 Rochester Street, Kansas City, Missouri, United States
- Coordinates: 39.12047°N 94.54874°W
- Owner: Frank Hicks, Mary Hicks
- Type: Concert Hall
- Events: Blues, Americana, Jazz, Roots, Gospel, Country

Construction
- Built: 1887
- Opened: 2001

Website
- knuckleheadskc.com

Knuckleheads is a music venue in Kansas City, Missouri. The facility is a complex of four stages: a large outdoor stage with a converted caboose to one side as a VIP seating area; an indoor stage; a large indoor stage known as Knuckleheads Garage and a lounge, the "Gospel Lounge" for Wednesday-evening blues-oriented church services. Live music can be presented on all four stages at once. The venue presents live music Wednesday through Sunday, with occasional Tuesday concerts.

== History ==
The original building was built in 1887 as a railroad boarding house, across the street from the original location of early Kansas City amusement park Electric Park. A very active train track runs close by the outdoor stage and performers have had to become accustomed to train whistles blowing during shows. Singer-songwriter Joe Ely was performing his song, "Boxcar", on the outdoor stage when a train came by, blowing its whistle at the right point in the song. Ely said he had "...waited 20 years for a train to come by at the perfect timing".

Knuckleheads is owned by Frank and Mary Hicks, who owned an auto body shop called Mid-City Collision Repair. They opened a Harley-Davidson motorcycle dealership across the street from Mid-City in 1997 called F.O.G. Cycles and sponsored street parties as a promotional tool, giving away free beer. In 2001, Hicks obtained a liquor license and the bar opened as Knucklehead's in homage to a trio of his cycling friends, calling themselves The Three Stooges. In 2004, Hicks closed F.O.G. Cycles to concentrate on the club. Mid-City has a mural painted on the wall facing Knuckleheads featuring rock, blues and country icons Elvis Presley, Stevie Ray Vaughan, Hank Williams Sr., Jimi Hendrix, John Lennon, Buddy Holly and many others.

== Location ==
The location in the East Bottoms on Rochester Street is bordered on the east by Montgall Ave, on the east by the North Chestnut Trafficway overpass and the south by railroad tracks.

== Knuckleheads Garage ==
The size of the smaller indoor facility, limited the venue's ability to present large concerts to temperate weather. On January 12, 2015, Knuckleheads launched a Kickstarter campaign to raise $35,000 to outfit the former Mid-City Collision Repair location as an additional indoor concert venue to be known as Knuckleheads Garage to hold 800 to 1000 guests. The campaign was successful, raising $38,490 on a $35,000 goal, and the venue premiered with an open house on April 11, 2015.

== Gospel lounge ==
Carl and Sharon Butler of the New Song Christian Fellowship church started holding church services in 2009 on Wednesday nights in the smallest of Knuckleheads' performance spaces. They are intended to be a church for those who work late on Saturday nights, what Butler describes as "a church geared toward service-industry people." Butler is a guitarist and recovering drug abuser and mixes music and preaching, playing "...everything from Merle Haggard to Motown".

== Performers ==
The zydeco band, Chubby Carrier and the Bayou Swamp Band, recorded their live album, Live at Knuckleheads, Kansas City, and an accompanying DVD in 2007, as did Cadillic Flambe.

The venue hosts several hundred performers every year, with concerts five nights a week, with two or three stages operating in a single night.

Well-known acts who have played Knuckleheads include Sam Bush, Leon Russell, Nick Lowe, Edgar Winter and his brother Johnny Winter, Keb' Mo', John Doe, Ian Moore, Ray Price, Billy Joe Shaver, Dale Watson, Kinky Friedman, Rodney Crowell, Samantha Fish, Amanda Fish, Danielle Nicole, Brandon Miller, Burton Cummings and David Lindley.

== Jam sessions ==
The venue hosts no-cover open jams on weekends, allowing amateur musicians to play on stage with professionals.

The Saturday jam is hosted by Billy Ebeling from 1 PM to 5:30 PM.

The Sunday jam is hosted by the band Levee Town from 1 PM to 6 PM.

== Facilities ==
All four stages feature 32 channel digital mixing boards.

The venue has television screens and projectors in every public and performer area to present what is happening on the various stages, or an in-house calendar of upcoming events. The saloon and outdoor stage has eight cameras feeding to a Blackmagic Design ATEM 1M/E video mixer. The Garage stage has six cameras going to a Ross Video Synergy video mixer. And in the gospel lounge there are four PTZ cameras going to a Blackmagic Design ATEM Television Studio. All switchers drive the in-house video and an optional Facebook web stream.

== Honors ==
Knuckleheads was given the Blues Foundation's Keeping the Blues Alive Award as Best Blues Club in 2008, calling it "...the place to see live Blues in Kansas City" and "...a premier stop for Blues artists traveling through the Midwest".

Starting in 2005, it has won Best Blues Club from the readers of the Kansas City alternative paper The Pitch, and has won that award for each of the following six years. Bill Brownlee of The Kansas City Star, in a review of a concert by Leon Russell, said "Knuckleheads is Kansas City's premier roots music venue of the last 30 years."
