= Belle of the West =

Studio album by Samantha Fish
- Released: November 3, 2017
- Studio: Zebra Ranch
- Length: 46:41
- Label: Ruf Records
- Producer: Luther Dickinson

Samantha Fish chronology
Chills & Fever (2017)	Belle of the West (2017)	Kill or Be Kind (2019)

Belle of the West is the fifth studio album by American singer-songwriter Samantha Fish. It was released on November 3, 2017, under Ruf Records. The album was produced by Luther Dickinson at Zebra Ranch.

== Critical reception ==
Professional ratings
Review scores
Source	Rating
AllMusic	4/5 stars
American Songwriter	3.5/5 stars

Belle of the West was met with generally favorable reviews from critics. Marty Gunther writing for Blues Blast Magazine, described it as an "intimate jam session" that "delivers the feel of her native Midwest and the Old West". JD Nash writing for American Blues Scene described the album as "quite possibly, Fish's finest work to date."

== Track listing ==
Belle of the West track listing
No.	Title	Writer(s)	Length
1.	"American Dream"	Samantha Fish	3:20
2.	"Blood in the Water"	Fish	4:01
3.	"Need You More"	Fish	4:01
4.	"Cowtown"	Fish	5:08
5.	"Daughters"	Fish	4:36
6.	"Don't Say You Love Me"	Fish	5:27
7.	"Belle of the West"	James Mathus	3:33
8.	"Poor Black Mattie"	R L Burnside	4:54
9.	"No Angels"	Fish	3:30
10.	"Nearing Home"	Lillie Mae	4:15
11.	"Gone for Good"	Fish	3:57
Total length:			46:41

== Personnel ==
Adapted from the album's liner notes.

- Samantha Fish – vocals, guitar
- Amy LaVere – bass
- Trina Raimey – drums, vocals
- Tikyra Jackson – drums, vocals
- Sharde Thomas – fife, drums, vocals
- Lightnin' Malcolm – guitar, harmonica, vocals
- Jimbo Mathus – harmonica, vocals, piano
- Lillie Mae – violin, vocals

== Charts ==
Chart performance for Belle of the West
Chart (2017)	Peak position
US Folk Albums (Billboard)	8
US Heatseekers Albums (Billboard)	1
