= Faster (album) =

Studio album by Samantha Fish
- Released: September 10, 2021
- Studio: The Village, West Los Angeles
- Genre: Hard rock, blues rock, country rock
- Label: Rounder
- Producer: Martin Kierszenbaum

Samantha Fish chronology
Kill or Be Kind (2019)	Faster (2021)

Faster is the seventh studio album by American singer-songwriter Samantha Fish. It was released on September 10, 2021, under Rounder Records. The album was produced by Martin Kierszenbaum at the Village studio in West Los Angeles.

== Critical reception ==
Professional ratings
Aggregate scores
Source	Rating
Metacritic	75/100
Review scores
Source	Rating
AllMusic	3.5/5 stars
American Songwriter	3/5 stars
PopMatters	8/10

Faster was met with some favorable reviews from critics. At Metacritic, which assigns a weighted average rating out of 100 to reviews from mainstream publications, this release received an average score of 75, based on 5 reviews.

== Track listing ==
Faster track listing
No.	Title	Writer(s)	Length
1.	"Faster"	Martin Kierszenbaum; Samantha Fish	2:55
2.	"All Ice No Whiskey"	Jim McCormick; Katie Pearlman; Kierszenbaum; Fish	3:09
3.	"Twisted Ambition"	Kierszenbaum; Fish	3:14
4.	"Hypnotic"	Kierszenbaum; Fish	3:09
5.	"Forever Together"	Kierszenbaum; Fish	2:53
6.	"Crowd Control"	McCormick; Fish	4:18
7.	"Imaginary War"	Kierszenbaum; Fish	3:09
8.	"Loud" (featuring Tech N9ne)	Aaron D. Yates; McCormick; Kierszenbaum; Fish	4:53
9.	"Better Be Lonely"	McCormick; Fish	3:40
10.	"So-Called Lover"	Fish	3:05
11.	"Like a Classic"	McCormick; Kierszenbaum; Fish	3:47
12.	"All the Words"	Fish	4:35

== Personnel ==
Adapted from the liner notes.

- Samantha Fish - vocals, guitar
- Hannah Brier - vocals
- Diego Navaira - bass
- Josh Freese - drums
- Martin Kierszenbaum - electric piano, organ, synthesizer, guitar, percussion
- Tech N9ne - vocals track 8

== Charts ==
Chart performance for Kill or Be Kind
Chart (2019)	Peak position
US Folk Albums (Billboard)	8
US Heatseekers Albums (Billboard)	14
US Top Blues Albums (Billboard)	1
