= Tamara Champlin =

American singer-songwriter

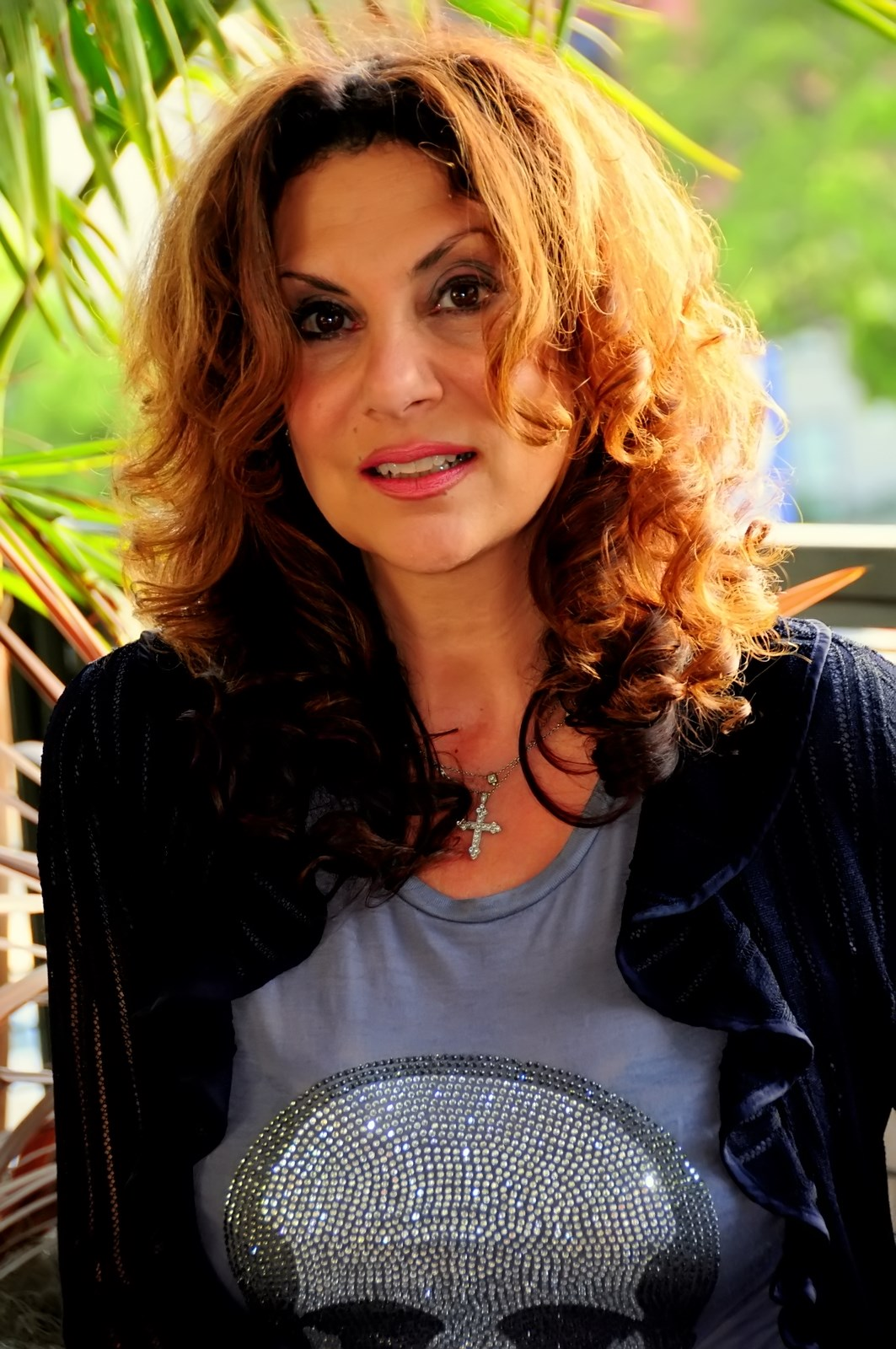
- Champlin in 2012

Background information
- Born: Tamara Matoesian; United States
- Genres: Rock, Americana, country
- Occupations: Musician, songwriter, performer
- Years active: 1980–present
- Label: Indie
- Website: TamaraChamplin.com

Tamara Champlin (née Matoesian) is an American singer-songwriter who started her career as a session singer in Houston, Texas, later moving to Los Angeles. She has performed with and written for singers such as Elton John, Leon Russell, Nicky Hopkins, Steve Lukather, Andreas Carlsson, husband Bill Champlin, and son Will Champlin.

Tour dates from 2010 to 2016 with Bill Champlin included California, Europe, Hawaii, Japan, South America, Kuwait and Iraq. She is a full member of the Sons of Champlin, a founding member of Bill Champlin & Wunderground, was active in the Rhythmic Arts Project to benefit children with intellectual disabilities, and in the Saving K-9 Lives charity, which encouraged the adoption of shelter pets.

== Early career ==
Tamara Champlin's career began as a Gilley's Club dancer and singer with Becky Bauch Williams (then Conway) in the movie Urban Cowboy, followed by singing credits on Elton John's album The Fox in 1981, and future husband Bill Champlin's album Runaway. She went on her first road trip to South Africa also in 1981, as part of Rita Coolidge's band. In films, she was the vocalist for "Heart of Glass" (composed with Bill Champlin and Bruce Gaitsch) in the Caddyshack II, and sang three songs in the Rob Lowe movie Illegally Yours in which she shared songwriting credits with Bruce Gaitsch on "Who Wins". With husband Bill Champlin and Rita Coolidge, she performed two songs on screen in the Jim Carrey movie "Copper Mountain". In 1983–84, she was a regular background vocalist on Alan Thicke's Show the "Thicke of the Night" and in 1988, was part of the Atlantic Records 40th Anniversary Celebration.

Writing collaborations followed, including "Price of Love" (with Jack Ponti and Vic Pepe) on the Baton Rouge album Lights Out on the Playground, "If You're Not The One For Me" (with Bruce Gaitsch), sung by Bill Champlin and Brenda Russell, on Tom Scott's album Keep This Love Alive, and "Stone Cold", released by Paul Rodgers (Queen/Bad Company) with his band The Law on their album Laying Down The Law (1991). She was a background vocalist on Peter Cetera's album World Falling Down.

== Solo career ==
Champlin's solo CD You Won't Get To Heaven Alive (Europe 1991) was released in the US in 1995 (Turnip). In addition to vocal and musical performances by many of the co-writers on the CD, performers such as Nicky Hopkins Bill Champlin, Tris Imboden and Greg Mathieson had contributing credits as players. "Tragic Black" (written with Michael Caruso and Cal Curtis) was number 1 in Germany and "You Won't Get To Heaven Alive" (a collaboration with Randy Cantor and Michael Caruso) reached the top 20 in Spain.

Also in 1995 she co-wrote three songs: "Southern Serenade" (on which she shared vocal credits), "God Sent Angels" (background vocals), and "Someone Else". She performed a duet on a Bill Champlin-Greg Mathieson tune "Love Is Gonna find You", featured on Bill Champlin's "He Started To Sing". On Bill Champlin's Live CD Mayday (Champlin Records 1996), she was part of the band that toured in Europe to promote it. The album included Bill and Tamara's duets in "Southern Serenade" and "Love Is Gonna Find You", and Tamara performed her own "Backstreets of Paradise".

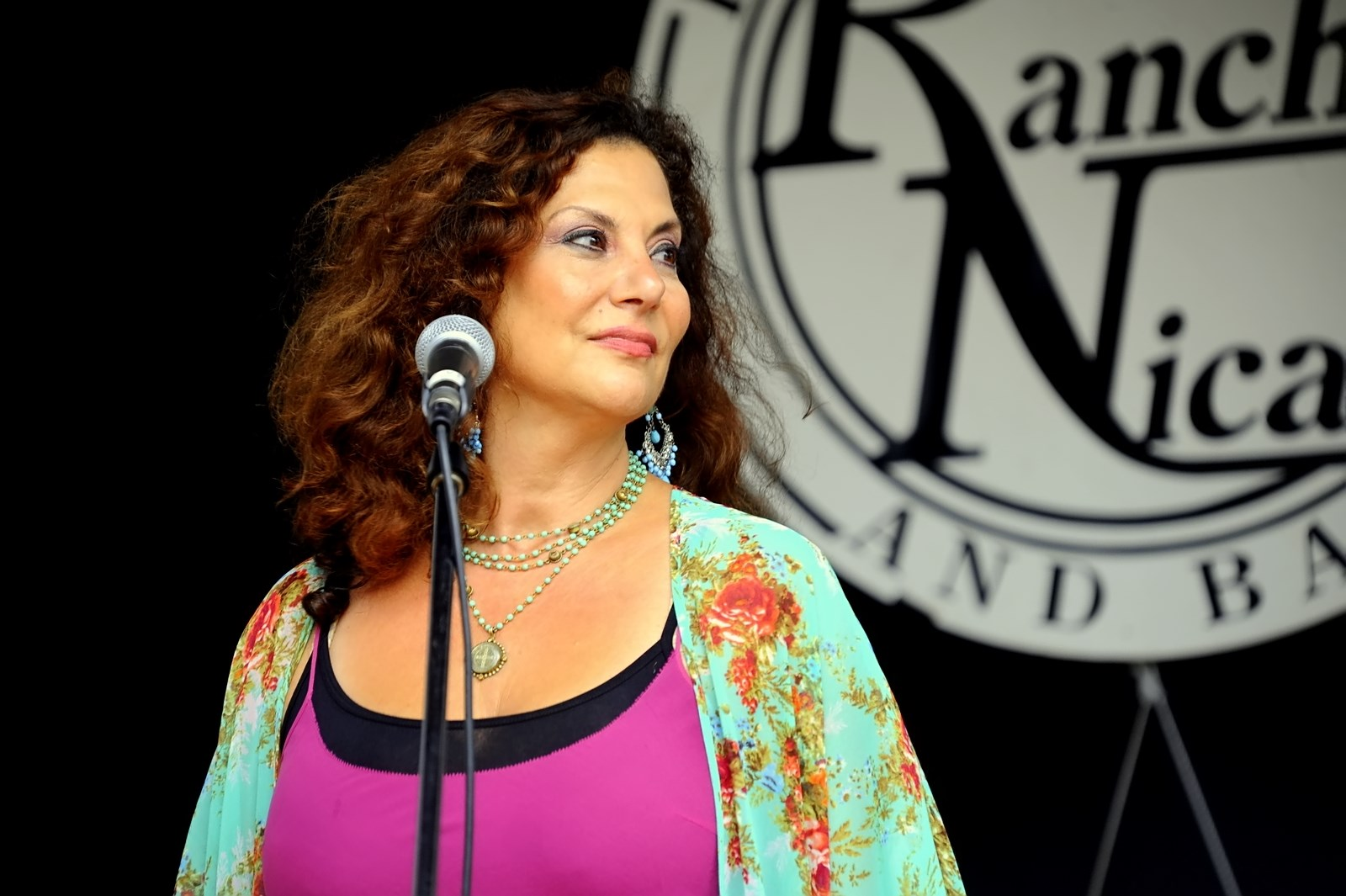
Tamara Champlin

A series of collection releases followed, on which she was a guest lead vocalist and writer: "Make You A Believer" on "World Jam Volume 1; "Express Yourself" from Rocco Prestia's solo release "Everybody on the Bus", both in 1999; "Talkin' To Angels" from a charity project "Wings of Light-Songs of Inspiration" (2001); Janey Clewer's "Love" CD (2012), on which she shared vocals on the title track (written by Janey Clewer) with Janey, Peter Cetera and Bill Champlin; "Voices in The Wind" from Frederic Slama's release "Secrets of LA" (2013); and was the featured vocalist on the tune "Circle of Danger" from Frédéric Slama's 2014 release LA Connection. In 2015, she released a single "Dreamin' of Chagall" (Champlin/Caruso/Champlin), inspired by works of artist Marc Chagall.

During that time she continued writing for other performers: "Saint Forgiveness" (Champlin/Gaitsch/Champlin) written for Bruce Gaitsch's 1997 album Aphasia; "Runaway Love" (Champlin/Caruso/Matkosky) recorded by both Rita Coolidge on her "Thinkin' About You" CD, (1998) and was a top 40 Billboard hit for Chris LeDoux on his "One Road Man". (1996). On Chicago's "What's It Gonna Be Santa" Christmas Release she and husband Bill Champlin (a 28-year member of the band) contributed a co-write that he sang: "Bethlehem". Many collaborations with Michael Caruso followed: "Shoo-Rah", "I'm Not Your Lover"; (Champlin/Caruso/Matkosky) recorded again, by Rita Coolige; "Louisiana Wind" written by Champlin, Caruso, Matkosky and Lecompt was featured on Mike LeCompt's "Can't Let Go"(2002); "Pretty Ugly" and "Pretty When She Cries" (Champlin/Caruso) from a Perfect Day's Release "All Over Everything" (2004) and Bekka Bramlett's Hit on Music Row "What's On My Mind" (2009). Son, Will Champlin, became part of this writing team in 2004 and the trio wrote many songs that featured Will as the vocalist for his first 3 albums (2004–2009). Will Champlin later went on to be part of Heather Headley's Grammy Award Winning Album "Audience of One" and was a Season 5 finalist on The Voice.

In addition to studio work, she performed her own music a live show in 2010 at Cafe 316 in Monterey, California, accompanied by Bill and Will Champlin. She was on a sold-out tour in Scandinavia (2011) that featured Leon Russell, Bill Champlin, Joe Williams, and Peter Friestedt, and again in 2016, as part of the Champlin Williams Friestedt tour in Europe and Japan. In 2014, she re-formed her own band, this time with husband Bill Champlin, Carmen Grillo, Johnny Griparic and Dave Raven, playing at the Los Angeles restaurant and live music venue, Genghis Cohen. From 2014–2023, she sang acoustically with Bill Champlin in the US, Europe, Japan, Hawaii, Central and South America, and also with the Sons of Champlin that toured steadily on the West Coast.

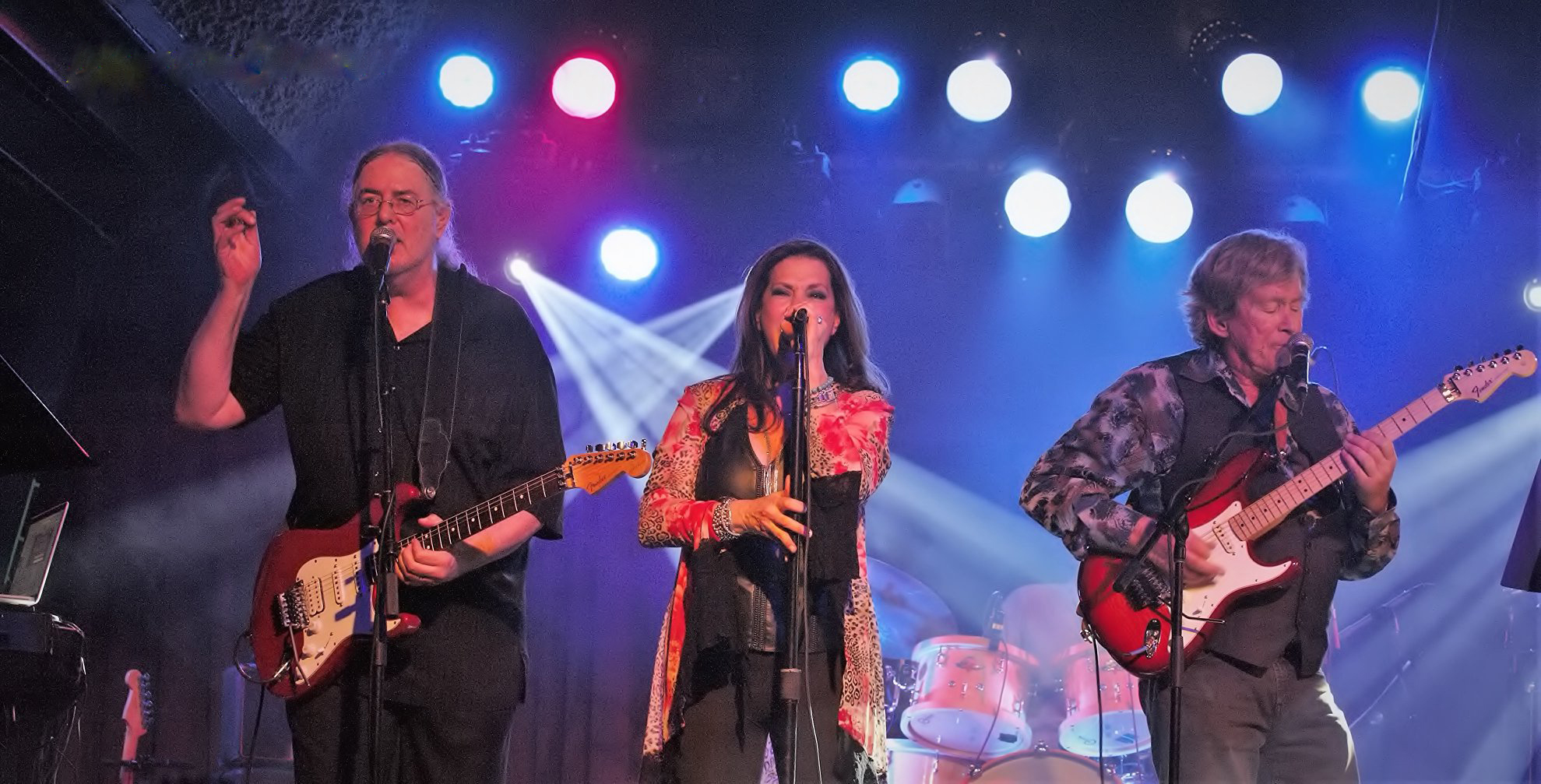
Bill Champlin and Wunderground performing in 2019

Tamara was involved with the group of musicians, including husband Bill and son Will, organized by Lone Wolf Entertainment in 2011, that traveled to Iraq and Kuwait to entertain US Forces stationed there. In 2014, she and Bill Champlin were part of a performance at Riverside, California, in support of the Lone Survivor Foundation, dedicated to assisting wounded American service members and their families. She was associated with Eddie Tuduri's Rhythmic Arts Project that helps children with learning disabilities and, in 2017, was part of their 20th anniversary show, where she performed a duet with Michael McDonald. She has worked with Saving K-9 Lives, founded by Jasmine and Bobby Kimball, and been part of concert performances for that organization. In 2018, she joined Bill Champlin and the Wunderground playing shows in 2018–2019, and releasing an album Bleeding Secrets.

== Personal life ==
Champlin is the daughter of Gregor and Kenarr Matoesian. She has three siblings. She is married to Bill Champlin, and the couple has their only biological offspring Will. She also has two step-children from her husband's prior marriage, Bradford Raymond Champlin and Amy Jo Kelly.

== Discography ==
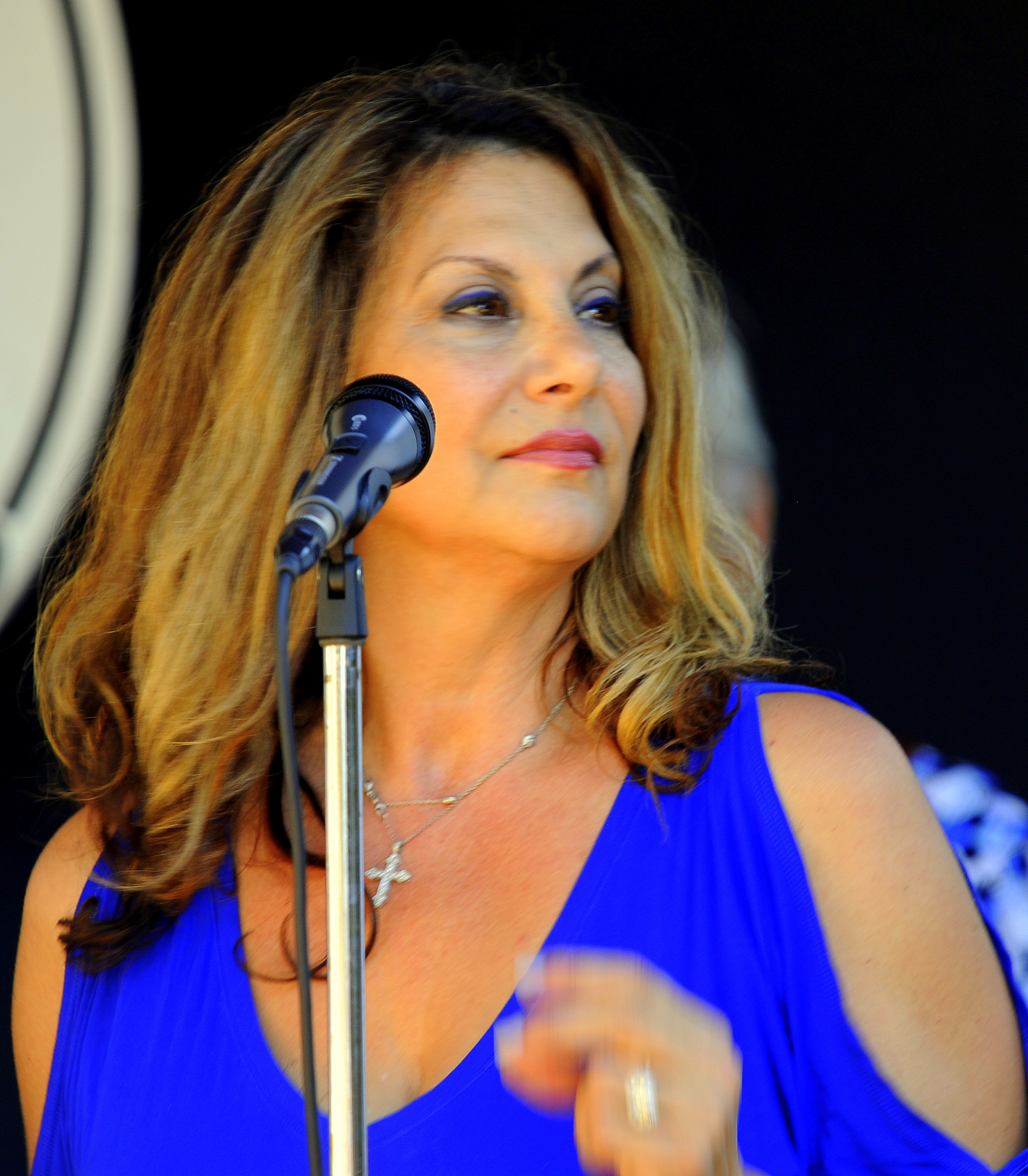
Champlin performing in 2014

- Featured singer/dancer at "Gilley's" in "Urban Cowboy" (Paramount Pictures – 1980)
- Background vocalist on Elton John's "The Fox" Album (Geffen – 1981)
- Background vocalist with Bill Champlin on Some Kind of Hero: title track from the Richard Pryor Movie featuring Richard Page on Lead Vocals (Paramount Pictures – 1980)
- Background vocalist on Don Johnson's Solo Album "Heartbeat" and singer/dancer on title track video (Epic/CBS- 1986)
- Lead vocals and co-write with Bill Champlin and Bruce Gaitsch on "Heart Of Glass" from "Caddyshack II" (Warner Bros. – 1988)
- Lead Vocals on "Thinking About It" "Yesterday Only" and "Who Wins" (the last sharing co-writing credits with Bruce Gaitsch) featured in the Rob Lowe Film "Illegally Yours" (United Artists – 1988)
- Co-writing credit with Vic Pepe and Jack Ponti for the Baton Rouge song "Price of Love" from their Release "Lights Out On The Playground" (Atlantic Records – 1991)
- "If You're Not The One For Me" written by Tamara Champlin and Bruce Gaitsch was performed by Bill Champlin and Brenda Russell on Tim Scotts "Keep This Love Alive" (GRP Records- 1991)
- "Stone Cold" (Champlin/Wilson co-write) recorded by Paul Rodger with his Band The Law from "Laying Down The Law" (Verve-Atlantic Records – 1991)
- "World Falling Down" Release by Peter Cetera; Tamara Champlin Background Vocals (Warner Bros – 1992)
- On Bill Champlin's "Burn Down the Night" CD, Tamara had a co-write credit on "Fly By The Light" and was a background vocalist on many tracks; On his "He Started To Sing" release she shared co-writes on "God Sent Angels", "Someone Else" and together they performed the duets "Love Is Gonna Find You" and another co-write "Southern Serenade"(Turnip – 1992,1995)
- Tamara Champlin's "You Won't Get To Heaven Alive" tracks included "Backstreets of Paradise" (Tamara Champlin/Terry Wilson), "You Won't Get To Heaven Alive" (Champlin/Caruso/Cantor), "Chasin' The Moon" (Champlin/Kevin Dukes), "Rock and Roll Tragedy"(Champlin/Dukes), "Purple Black and Blonde"(Champlin/Caruso/Curtis), "Stone Cold" (Champlin/Wilson), "Only Love"(Champlin/Cantor), "Crawl"(Champlin/Paris), "Meet My Maker"(Champlin/Wilson), "Tragic Black"(Champlin/Caruso/Curtis), "St. Anne's Wheel"(Champlin/Caruso/Champlin) and "Roll The Bones"(Champlin/Wilson) (Released 1991 in Europe; Turnip (US)1995)
- From Bruce Gaitsch "Aphasia" CD, she, Bill Champlin and Bruce Gaitsch wrote a tune called "St Forgiveness" (Thoughtscape Sounds – 1997)
- "Runaway Love" (Champlin/Caruso/Matkosky) was recorded by Rita Coolidge on her "Thinkin' About You" Rita Coolidge CD (Innerworks Records International 1998); and by Chris LeDoux on his "One Road Man" (Capitol Records Nashville 1998). Also on "Thinkin' About You" were 2 other Champlin/Caruso/Matkosky tunes: "I'm Not Your Lover" and "Shoo-Rah"
- "Bethlehem" written by Bill and Tamara Champlin recorded by Chicago on their "What's It Gonna Be Santa" Christmas Release (Rhino Entertainment – 1998, 2003)
- "Make You A Believer" from "World Jam Volume 1" (Worldwide Records – 1999)
- "Express Yourself" from Rocco Prestia's's Solo Release "Everyone On The Bus" (Lightyear Entertainment – 1999)
- "Miracles" from Jessica Folcker's Swedish Release "Dino" penned with Bill Champlin, Andreas Carlsson and Douglas Carr (SME Records, Inc – 2000)

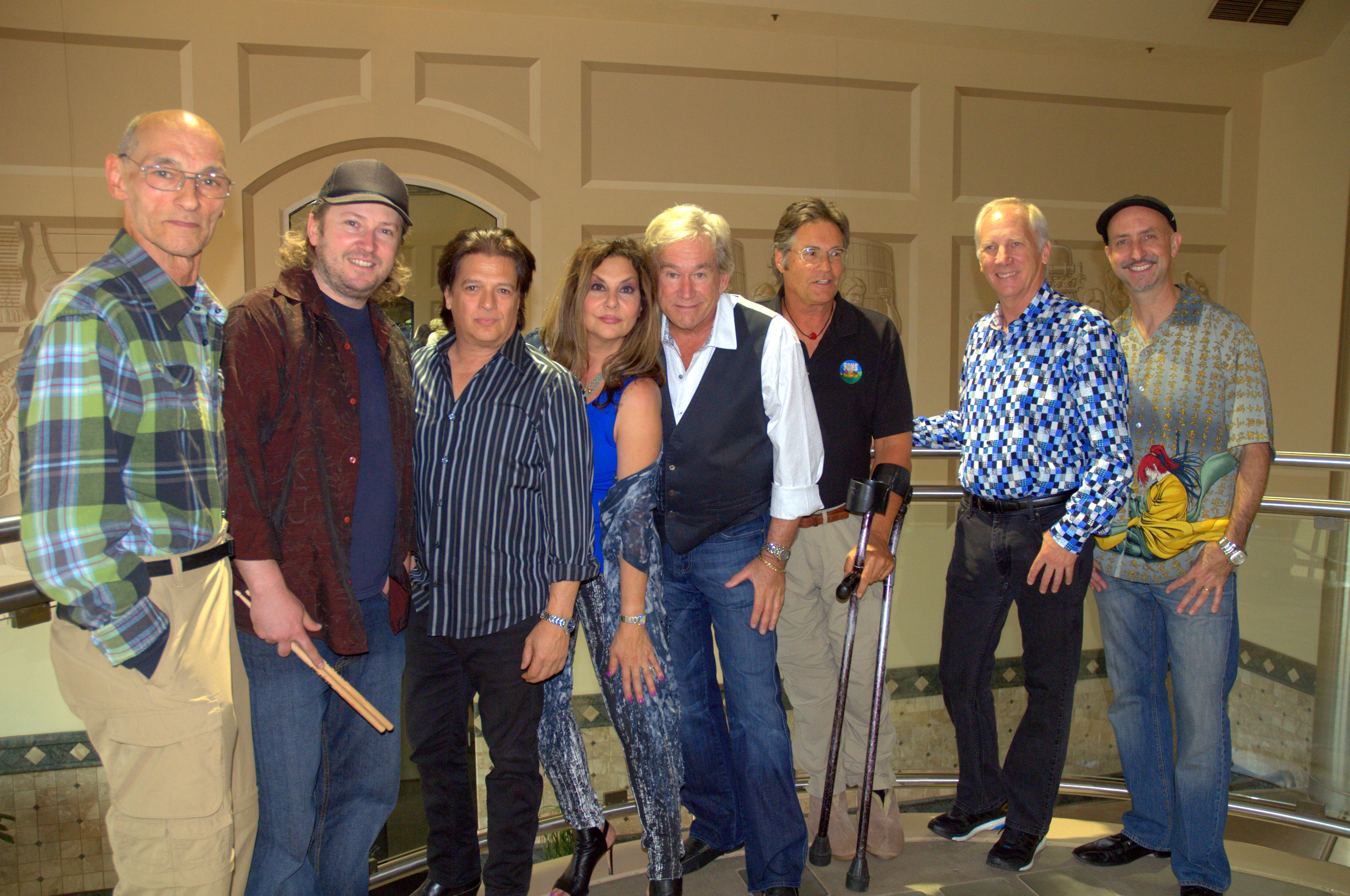
with the Sons of Champlin, 2015.

- "Higher Ground" from the Doobie Brothers Release Sibling Rivalry written with Bill Champlin and Tom Johnston (Rhino – 2000)
- "Don't Get Me Dreamin'" written with Michael Caruso and Blaise Tosti for Stampede's "Amame" (Sony – 2000)
- "Sorry I'm in Love" written with Bill Champlin, Andreas Carlsson and Douglas Carr for Emilia Rydberg Release "Emilia" (Universal – 2000)
- "No Sad Goodbye" and "All I Wanna Do (We Do)" written by Tamara Champlin, Douglas Carr & Ulric Johansson for the Maria Montell Release "Think Positive" (Universal- Denmark – 2002)
- "Living My Life Out Loud" written by Will Champlin and Tamara Champlin: title track of Lori Michael's CD (Reform Records – 2008). Also on the Release was a Tamara Champlin/Michael Caruso co-write "Pretty When She Cries" that was later featured and performed by Lori Michaels on the VH1 Series Single Ladies (Episode 7 of 2011 season)
- "Love" (written by Janey Clewer) shared vocals with Peter Cetera, Janey Clewer & Bill Champlin on the Clewer Release "Love"(Vivid Sound – 2012)
- "Swept Away" (Tamara Champlin, Michael Caruso & Tom Saviano) from Nebraska Falls Release "The Real Story" (Nebraska Falls Music – 2015)
- "Dreamin'Of Chagall" written with Bill Champlin and Michael Caruso and performed by Tamara Champlin (Released Champlin x2 Records – 2015)
- "Crawl" written by Tamara Champlin & Jeff Paris from the Danielle Nicole Grammy Nominated release Cry No More (Concord Records – 2018)
- "Bleeding Secrets" Studio CD Release with Bill Champlin & WunderGround (WunderGround Records – 2018)
- "Price of Love"(Champlin, Pepe & Ponti) from Champlin, Williams, Friestedt Release "CWFII" (Black Lodge 2020)
- "Livin' For Love" Bill Champlin solo release featured Tamara Champlin as a writer and vocalist on several of the tracks (Imagen Records 2021)
- Tamara's recordings of "I'm Not Your Lover" "Runaway Love" "Bad Love" "Shoo Rah" "Louisiana Wind" and "Super Flower Moon" were added in 2022-2023 to downloading/streaming services Writers included Tamara, Michael Caruso, Dennis Matkosky, and Michael LeCompt. (Distributed by Distrokid - 2022)
- On the third Champlin, Williams Friestedt Release (CWF III), she is a featured singer on "The Last Unbroken Heart", "I Will Find You There" and "Fly Away Now" (that she co-wrote with Bill Champlin & Peter Friestedt) (Black Lodge-2024).
