= Wild Heart (Samantha Fish album) =

Studio album by Samantha Fish
- Released: June 14, 2015
- Studio: Blade Studios
- Label: Ruf Records
- Producer: Luther Dickinson

Samantha Fish chronology
Black Wind Howlin (2013)	Wild Heart (2015)	Chills & Fever (2017)

Wild Heart is the third studio album by American singer-songwriter Samantha Fish. It was released on June 14, 2015.

The album was produced by Luther Dickinson. It was recorded at Blade Studios in Shreveport, Louisiana, with additional recordings at Ardent Studios, Zebra Ranch and Royal Recording Studios, Memphis.

== Critical reception ==
Marty Guntar writing for Blues Blast Magazine described it as having a "superstar lineup" and that "the end product is head-and-shoulders her best", stating that he "Highly recommended" the album.

Bill Brownlee writing for NPR in Kansas City wrote positively about the album, describing the songs as "sturdy" while praising Fish's guitar work and vocal strength. He also praised the production work of Luther Dickinson noting that Luther gave the band a "house-rocking sound". He was however critical of the decision to market the album as blues rather than rock, which he felt was limiting for her career.

== Track listing ==
Wild Heart track listing
No.	Title	Writer(s)	Length
1.	"Road Runner"	Samantha Fish	3:25
2.	"Place to Fall"	Jim McCormick, Fish	6:07
3.	"Blame It on the Moon"	Fish	3:35
4.	"Highway's Holding Me Now"	Fish	4:25
5.	"Go Home"	Fish	6:01
6.	"Jim Lee Blues Pt. 1"	Charley Patton	3:53
7.	"Turn It Up"	Fish	3:39
8.	"Show Me"	McCormick, Fish	4:54
9.	"Lost Myself"	Fish	6:04
10.	"Wild Heart"	McCormick, Fish	3:37
11.	"Bitch on the Run"	McCormick, Fish	3:14
12.	"I'm in Love with You"	Junior Kimbrough	3:57
Total length:			53:00

== Personnel ==
Adapted from the album's liner notes.

- Samantha Fish – vocals, lead guitar
- Luther Dickinson – bass guitar (1, 2, 3, 4, 7, 10, 11), lap steel guitar (2, 3, 9), guitar (2, 3, 5, 7, 9, 11, 12), mandolin (6)
- Brady Blade – drums (1, 2, 3, 4, 5, 7, 8, 9, 10, 11)
- Rissie Norman – vocals (1, 2, 4, 5, 10, 11)
- Shontelle Norman-Beatty – vocals (1, 2, 4, 5, 10, 11)
- Sharde Thomas – drums (5, 6, 12), vocals (12)
- Lightnin' Malcolm – guitar (6)
- Dominic Davis – bass guitar (8)

Other staff:

- Ruben M Williams – Executive producer
- Thomas Ruf – Executive producer
- Chris Bell – engineer, mixer
- Brad Blackwood – mastering
- Adam Hill – recording
- Boo Mitchell – recording
- Kevin Houston – recording
- Dennis Gatz – photography
- Queens-Design.de – artwork

== Charts ==
Chart performance for Chills & Fever
Chart (2017)	Peak position
US Top Blues Albums (Billboard)	1
US Heatseekers Albums (Billboard)	14
