= Chills & Fever =

Chill & Fever

Studio album by Samantha Fish
- Released: March 17, 2017
- Studio: The 45 Factory
- Label: Ruf Records
- Producer: Bobby Harlow

Samantha Fish chronology
Wild Heart (2015)	Chill & Fever (2017)	Belle of the West (2017)

Chills & Fever is the fourth studio album by American singer-songwriter Samantha Fish. It was released on March 17, 2017.

The album was produced by Bobby Harlow. It was recorded at The 45 Factory, Detroit, MI.

== Critical reception ==
Tom O'Connor writing for Rock and Blues Muse gave it a mixed but generally favourable review, stating that "for the most part it works", describing the album as "clean, compressed and polished".

== Track listing ==
Chills & Fever track listing
No.	Title	Writer(s)	Length
1.	"He Did It"	Jackie DeShannon & Sharon Sheeley	3:00
2.	"Chills & Fever"	Bobby Rackep & Billy J Ross	3:19
3.	"Hello Stranger"	Barbara Lewis	4:22
4.	"It's Your Voodoo Working"	Charles Sheffield	3:39
5.	"Hurt's All Gone"	Roy Alfred & Jerry Ragovoy	3:43
6.	"You Can't Go"	L. Duggan	4:03
7.	"Either Way I Lose"	Van McCoy	5:27
8.	"Never Gonna Cry"	Fenton Robinson	4:12
9.	"Little Baby"	Michael Stubbs	2:56
10.	"Nearer to You"	Allen Toussaint	3:24
11.	"You'll Never Change"	Willie Schofield & Robert West	3:11
12.	"Crow Jane"	Julius Daniels	3:31
13.	"Somebody's Always Trying"	Joy Byers	6:03
14.	"I'll Come Running Over"	Bert Berns	3:24

== Personnel ==
Adapted from the liner notes.

- Samantha Fish – vocals, lead guitar
- Steve Nawara – bass guitar
- Kenny Tudrick – drums
- Bob Mervak – electric piano
- Joe Mazzola – rhythm guitar
- Travis Blotsky – saxophone
- Mark Levron – trumpet

== Charts ==
Chart performance for Chills & Fever
Chart (2017)	Peak position
US Top Blues Albums (Billboard)	3
US Heatseekers Albums (Billboard)	7
