= Wolf Den =

Studio album by Danielle Nicole
- Released: August 21, 2015
- Studio: Esplanade Studios
- Label: Concord Records
- Producer: Anders Osborne

Danielle Nicole chronology
Danielle Nicole (2015)	Wolf Den (2015)	Cry No More (2018)

Wolf Den is the debut studio album by American singer-songwriter Danielle Nicole (she had previously released a self titled EP). It was released on August 21, 2015. The majority of the writing for the album was reportedly completed in just three days. The album itself was recorded at Esplanade Studios in six days.

== Critical reception ==
McKinnie Sizemore writing for Blues Rock Review gave the album 8/10. John Mitchell writing in Blues Blast Magazine described it as a "great piece of soul and New Orleans-infused blues". Describing the album as "all about the singers voice" and that in this regard, she "nailed it".

== Track listing ==
Wolf Den track listing
No.	Title	Writer(s)	Length
1.	"Wolf Den"	Anders Osborne, Danielle Nicole Schnebelen	4:33
2.	"How You Gonna Do Me Like That"	Anders Osborne, Danielle Nicole Schnebelen	4:57
3.	"Take It All"	Anders Osborne, Danielle Nicole Schnebelen	2:57
4.	"You Only Need Me When You're Down"	Anders Osborne, Danielle Nicole Schnebelen	3:08
5.	"Just Give Me Tonight"	Anders Osborne, Danielle Nicole Schnebelen	5:31
6.	"Easin' Into The Night"	Anders Osborne, Danielle Nicole Schnebelen	3:36
7.	"Didn't Do You No Good"	Danielle Nicole Schnebelen	5:24
8.	"Waiting On Your Love"	Anders Osborne, Danielle Nicole Schnebelen	3:07
9.	"I Feel Like Breakin' Up Somebody's Home"	Al Jackson Jr., Timothy L. Matthews	4:45
10.	"It Ain't You"	Anders Osborne	3:51
11.	"In My Dreams"	Danielle Nicole Schnebelen	4:41
12.	"Fade Away"	Danielle Nicole Schnebelen, Mike Sedovic	4:01
Total length:			51:00

== Personnel ==
Adapted from the albums' liner notes.

- Danielle Nicole – vocals, bass
- Anders Osborne – guitar
- Luther Dickinson – guitar (track 8,9)
- Mike Sedovic – keyboards
- Stanton Moore – drums

== Charts ==
Chart performance for Wolf Den
Chart (2015)	Peak position
US Top Blues Albums (Billboard)	2
US Heatseekers Albums (Billboard)	14
