= Kill or Be Kind =

Studio album by Samantha Fish
- Released: September 20, 2019
- Studio: Royal Studios
- Length: 45:32
- Label: Rounder
- Producer: Scott Billington

Samantha Fish chronology
Belle of the West (2017)	Kill or Be Kind (2019)	Faster (2021)

Kill or Be Kind is the sixth studio album by American singer-songwriter Samantha Fish. It was released on September 20, 2019 under Rounder Records.

The album was produced by Scott Billington at Royal Studios in Memphis, Tennessee.

== Critical reception ==
Professional ratings
Aggregate scores
Source	Rating
Metacritic	80/100
Review scores
Source	Rating
AllMusic	4/5 stars
American Songwriter	3.5/5 stars

Kill or Be Kind was met with generally favorable reviews from critics. At Metacritic, which assigns a weighted average rating out of 100 to reviews from mainstream publications, this release received an average score of 80, based on 5 reviews.

== Track listing ==
Kill or Be Kind track listing
No.	Title	Writer(s)	Length
1.	"Bulletproof"	Samantha Fish	5:19
2.	"Kill or Be Kind"	Jim McCormick, Fish	3:45
3.	"Love Letters"	McCormick, Fish	3:38
4.	"Watch It Die"	Patrick Sweany, Fish	5:00
5.	"Try Not to Fall in Love with You"	Fish	4:04
6.	"Fair-Weather"	Kate L. Pearlman, Fish	4:12
7.	"Love Your Lies"	McCormick, Fish	2:47
8.	"Dream Girl"	McCormick, Fish	4:14
9.	"She Don't Live Around Here"	Parker Millsap, Fish	5:45
10.	"Dirty"	Pearlman, Fish	3:27
11.	"You Got It Bad"	Eric McFadden, Fish	3:21
Total length:			45:32

== Personnel ==
Adapted from Rock and Blues Muse.

- Samantha Fish – vocals, guitar
- Austin Clements – bass
- Rick Steff – Hammond B3 and synthesizer
- Andriu Yanovski – Moog synthesizer
- Doug Belote – drums
- Jim Spake – saxophone
- Tom Clary – trumpet
- Anjelika "Jelly" Joseph – vocals
- Kayla Jasmine – vocals

== Charts ==
Chart performance for Kill or Be Kind
Chart (2019)	Peak position
Belgian Albums (Ultratop Wallonia)	189
US Folk Albums (Billboard)	8
US Heatseekers Albums (Billboard)	1
US Top Blues Albums (Billboard)	1
