= Amanda Fish =

American singer-songwriter

- Genres: Blues, blues-rock
- Occupations: Singer-songwriter, multi-instrumentalist
- Instruments: Bass guitar, piano, guitar, mandolin, ukulele, vocals
- Years active: 2012–present
- Label: VizzTone Records
- Website: www.amandafishband.com

Amanda Fish is an American blues singer-songwriter and multi-instrumentalist. Her 2018 album, Free, debuted at number 6 in the Billboard Blues Albums Chart. At the 40th Blues Music Awards, it was named the Best Emerging Artist Album.

Her younger sister, Samantha Fish, is a fellow blues and roots rock singer-songwriter, formerly recording for Ruf Records.

== Career ==
In her adolescence, Amanda Fish retreated to her own room to practice her singing while her younger sister, Samantha Fish, did likewise to play her guitar. Their original inspiration came from their parents; their mother, a classically trained mezzo-soprano, violinist and pianist was the director of a local Kansas City church choir, and their father played his guitar with friends. Initially hearing recordings of Bonnie Raitt and Stevie Ray Vaughan, they later heard music from Tom Petty and the Rolling Stones. The sisters were both drawn towards blues music in their teenage years, however Amanda did not commence writing or performing until 2012. She first performed solo in a singer-songwriter vein, before forming her own band in 2014. The following year she released her debut album, Down in the Dirt, on VizzTone Records, for which she was honored with the Sean Costello Rising Star Award from Blues Blast magazine. On Down in the Dirt, her band consisted of Amanda Fish (vocals, guitar), Sean McDonnell (vocals, guitar), Cole Dillingham (vocals, guitar, bass) and Kristopher Schenbelen (drums). The latter previously played as part of Trampled Under Foot. Fish wrote all the material, although four of the songs were co-written with McDonnell.

Fish and her band reached the semi-finals of the 2017 International Blues Challenge. The same year, Fish was featured on the Homegrown Buzz Showcase on KRBZ radio station. Fish toured with her band, before returning to the recording studio to produce her sophomore album, Free, which was released in her own name in September 2018. The album included contributions from her fellow Vizztone label mates, Tyler Morris and Bob Margolin. Free debuted at number 6 in the Billboard Blues Albums Chart. "The Ballad of Lonesome Cowboy Bill" was the first single released from Free. At the 40th Blues Music Awards, it was named the Best Emerging Artist Album.

In 2018, Fish appeared at the Briggs Farm Blues Festival. Her band has also appeared in 2018 at the Mimbres Region Arts Council Silver City Blues Festival, in 2019 at the Michael Arnone Crawfish Festival and in 2021 at the WC Handy Blues Festival. Other, perhaps smaller but no less notable venues and festivals include: The Durango Blues Train Music Festival in 2018, Al Bum's Concert Patio in 2018, Whiskey Rebellion Festival in 2018, Riverfront Blues Fest in 2018, Hill Fest Blues in 2020, Camping With The Blues in 2018 and 2020, and Canadian Blues venues; Sault Blues Society in 2019, Blues on Whyte, Buds on Broadway and the Blues Can.

Starting in 2020 and extending into 2021, Amanda and her husband recorded a CD of all new material in her makeshift home studio.

== Discography ==
=== Albums ===
| Title | Year | Artist Name | Label |
|---|---|---|---|
| Down in the Dirt | 2015 | Amanda Fish Band | VizzTone Records |
| Free | 2018 | Amanda Fish | VizzTone Records |
| Trailer Park Demos | 2021 | Amanda Fish | Self-produced |
| Kingdom | 2024 | Amanda Fish | VizzTone Records |
