= Cry No More (Danielle Nicole album) =

Studio album by Danielle Nicole
- Released: February 23, 2018
- Length: 61:11
- Label: Concord Records
- Producer: Tony Braunagel

Danielle Nicole chronology
Wolf Den (2015)	Cry No More (2018)

Cry No More is the second studio album by American singer-songwriter Danielle Nicole after Wolf Den. Her first release was a self-titled EP. Cry No More was released on February 23, 2018.

== Critical reception ==
Martine Ehrenclou writing on Rock and Blues Muse, describes the album as a "standout" with "exquisite musicianship". Mark Thompson writing in Blues Blast magazine described the album as a triumph for the artist. George Graham in his album review, said the album is world-class and described it as tasteful blues-rock and soul, giving it an A grade for sound quality.

== Awards ==
In May 2019, Danielle Nicole's album Cry No More, received two Blues Music Awards for Contemporary Blues Female Artist and Bass Instrumentalist and garnered three additional Independent Blues Awards in September 2019 for best R&B Soul CD, Music Video for the album's title track, and R&B Soul Song for Prince's "How Come U Don't Call Me Anymore?".

== Track listing ==
Cry No More track listing
No.	Title	Writer(s)	Length
1.	"Crawl"	Jeff Paris, Tamara Champlin	4:26
2.	"I'm Going Home"	Danielle Schnebelen, Tony Braunagel	4:24
3.	"Hot Spell"	Anthony La Peau, Bill Withers, Guy Caman	4:09
4.	"Burnin' for You"	Danielle Schnebelen, Tony Braunagel	4:25
5.	"Cry No More"	Danielle Schnebelen, Tony Braunagel	4:22
6.	"Poison the Well"	Maia Sharp, Pamela Rose	3:36
7.	"Bobby"	Danielle Schnebelen	4:10
8.	"Save Me"	Danielle Schnebelen, Tony Braunagel	4:36
9.	"How Come U Don't Call Me Anymore?"	Prince Rogers Nelson	3:54
10.	"Baby Eyes"	Danielle Schnebelen	5:26
11.	"Pusher Man"	Danielle Schnebelen, John Lardieri	3:46
12.	"My Heart Remains"	Danielle Schnebelen	4:11
13.	"Someday You Might Change Your Mind"	Danielle Schnebelen, Tony Braunagel	5:25
14.	"Lord I Just Can't Keep From Crying"	Blind Willie Johnson	4:14
Total length:			61:11

== Personnel ==
Adapted from the liner notes.

- Danielle Nicole – vocals, bass
- Kudisan Kai – backing vocal (tracks: 1, 2, 4 5)
- Maxanne Lewis – backing vocal (tracks: 1, 2, 4, 5)
- Tony Braunagel – drums
- Brandon Miller – guitar (track 10)
- Nick Schnebelen – guitar (track 1)
- Johnny Lee Schell – guitar (tracks: 2,3,4,5,6, 8,10,14), fiddle (track 7)
- Kenny Wayne Shepherd – guitar (track 8)
- Luther Dickinson – guitar (track 14)
- Walter Trout – guitar (track 4)
- Sonny Landreth – slide guitar (track 2)
- Mike Finnigan – keyboards, organ (track 2, 4, 5, 6, 8, 10)
- Mike Sedovic – keyboards, organ (track 1,3)

== Charts ==
Chart performance for Cry No More
Chart (2018)	Peak position
US Top Blues Albums (Billboard)	1
