= Forty Below Records =

Independent record label

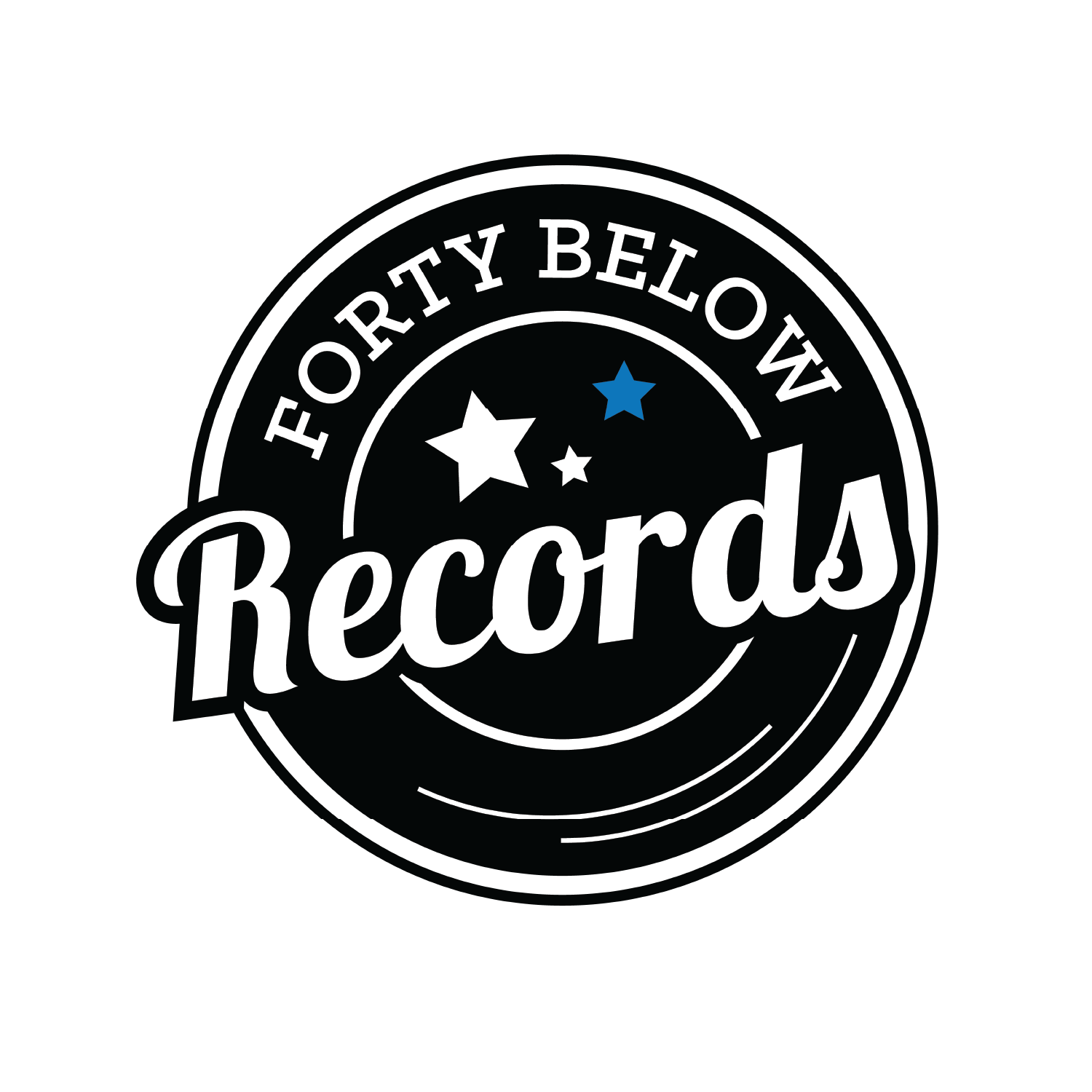
- Founded: 2013
- Founder: Eric Corne
- Distributor: AMPED
- Genre: Blues, Americana, alt-country, soul
- Country of origin: United States
- Location: Los Angeles
- Official website: fortybelowrecords.com

Forty Below Records in an independent record label based in Los Angeles that promotes new blues, country, and soul music artists, along with issuing albums by established musicians from a variety of backgrounds. The label was founded by songwriter and producer Eric Corne, and began releasing albums in 2013. Among the artists featured by the label are country singer Dale Watson, blues veteran Charlie Musselwhite, and blues-soul singer-songwriter Sugaray Rayford. Late English blues pioneer and Rock and Roll Hall of Fame inductee John Mayall recorded his last five studio albums with Forty Below.

== History ==
Forty Below’s first release was Kail Baxley’s Heatstroke/The Wind and the War (2013). The album was nominated for NPR Album of the Year.

In 2014, Forty Below signed Rock & Roll Hall of Fame member John Mayall.

In 2017 Forty Below released Jaime Wyatt’s debut album Felony Blues.

Sugaray Rayford's Somebody Save Me album, was nominated for the 2020 Contemporary Blues Album Grammy, while also earning Rayford Blues Music Awards for Soul Blues Male Artist and B.B. King Entertainer of the Year.

In 2022 Forty Below signed Grammy winner and Blues Hall of famer Joe Louis Walker. Rayford won the 2023 Blues Music Award for Soul Blues Album of the Year for In Too Deep.

In 2024 Forty Below released Danielle Nicole’s The Love You Bleed and Jake Shimabukuro & Mick Fleetwood’s Blues Experience.

In 2025 Charlie Musselwhite’s Look Out Highway was nominated for the Best Traditional Blues Grammy.

== Roster ==
- Bill Carter
- Chambers Deslauriers
- Charlie Musselwhite
- Dale Watson
- Dallas Burrow
- Danielle Nicole
- Dom Martin
- Eric Corne
- Freedy Johnston
- JD Simo & Luther Dickinson
- Jaime Wyatt
- Jake Shimabukuro & Mick Fleetwood
- Joe Louis Walker
- John Mayall
- J.P. Soars feat. Anne Harris
- KaiL Baxley
- Mike Finnigan
- Philip Sayce
- Sam Morrow
- Sara Petite
- Sugaray Rayford
- The Bacon Brothers
- The Claudettes
- The Doohickeys
- The HawtThorns
- Tony Holiday
