= Buddahead =

American indie rock band

Buddahead is a New York City based indie rock band that was most active in the early 2000s for several years. While the band no longer tours it still writes and records.

The band was started and is led by Iranian born vocalist and songwriter Raman Kia who spent his early years in war-torn Iran of the 1980s, before moving to England with his mother.

The other members of Buddahead included Simon Gibson on lead guitars, Toby Evers on bass guitar, and Rich Scannella on drums. In later years Bryan Smith was added on keyboards. Scannella replaced original drummer Al B in early 2004. The group also featured drummer Nigel Sifantus and Kansas City guitarist Nick Schnebelen, who left in early 2005 after Buddahead's fall tour.

== Discography ==
- Crossing the Invisible Line, 2004
- Connect Set, 2005 (EP)
- Ashes, 2008

== See also ==
- Iranian rock
