= Nick Schnebelen =

American songwriter (born 1978)

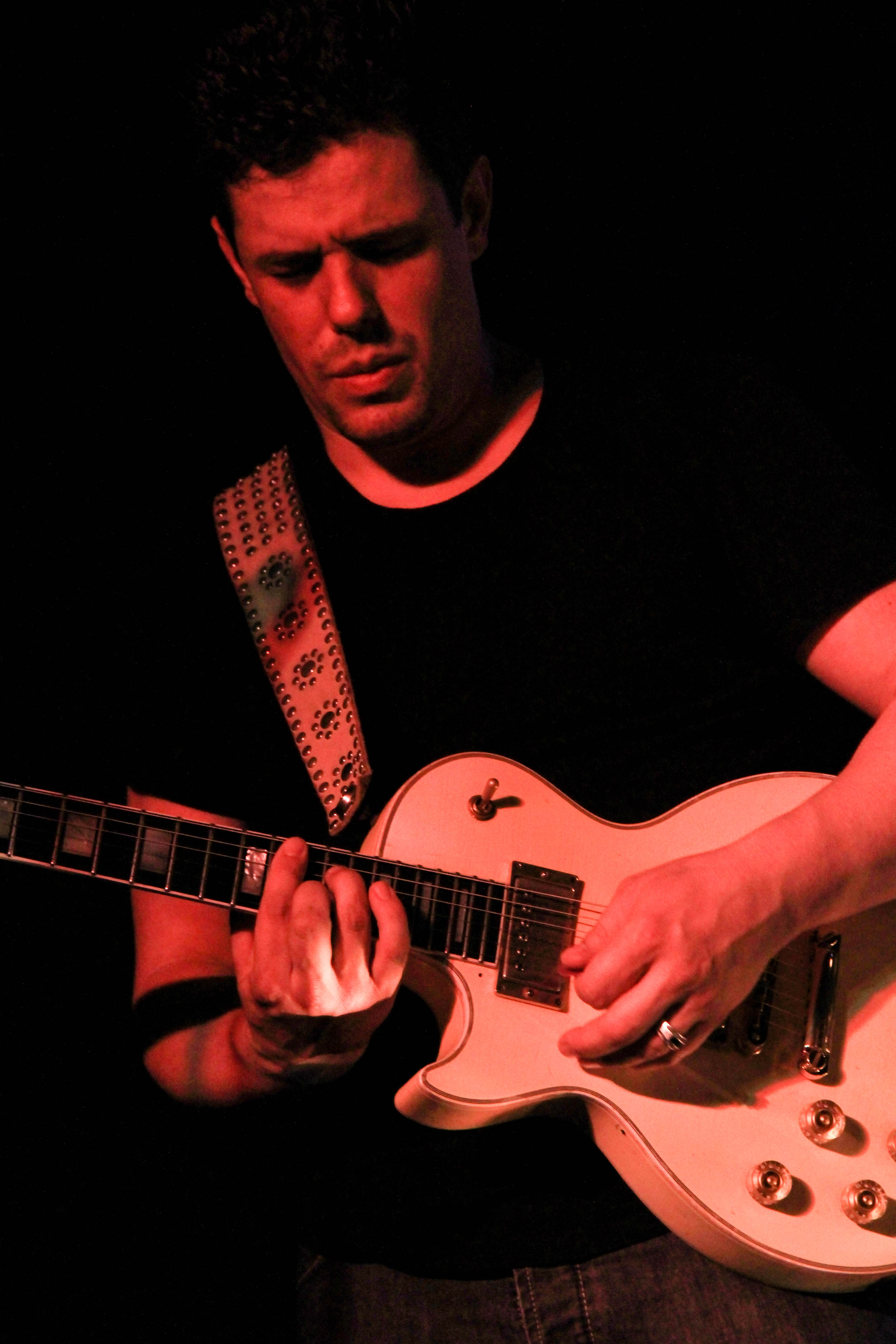

Background information
- Born: Nicholas Robert Schnebelen; September 30, 1978 (age 47)
- Origin: Kansas City, Missouri, United States
- Genres: Blues rock, blues
- Occupations: Singer, guitarist, songwriter
- Instruments: Vocals, guitar
- Label: Vizztone Records
- Website: Official website

Nicholas Robert Schnebelen (born September 30, 1978) is an American blues rock musician from Kansas City, Missouri, United States. He has toured with Buddahead and was an original member of Trampled Under Foot. Schnebelen became a solo artist in 2015, and released two live albums the following year. The Seattle Post-Intelligencer stated that Schnebelen offers "[e]chos of the blues like Freddie King, Buddy Guy... Nick Schnebelen’s world-class guitar playing leads the way."

His album, Crazy All By Myself (2019), entered the US Billboard Blues Albums Chart at number 13.

== Background ==
Trampled Under Foot was an American soul blues and blues rock band. The original trio consisted of the siblings Danielle Schnebelen (lead vocals and bass), Nick Schnebelen (guitars and vocals) and Kris Schnebelen (drums and vocals). The band was the winner of the International Blues Challenge in 2008. Their 2013 album, Badlands, reached number one on the US Billboard Blues Albums Chart. At the 2014 Blues Music Awards, Badlands won the 'Contemporary Blues Album of the Year' category. The band was also nominated in the 'Band of the Year' category. Trampled Under Foot split up in 2015.

== Career ==
Schnebelen was born in Kansas City, Missouri, United States. His father and mother were both professional musicians. Nick's father, Bob, played in a blues band, whilst his maternal grandmother was a jazz singer, who got to sing with Count Basie. Prior to that, the family's musical heritage dates back to violin players living in Eastern Europe. Schnebelen was educated at Kansas City's Paseo Academy, where he studied both classical music and jazz. In 1997, Schbnebelen moved to Philadelphia and formed a jam band, K-Floor, who played predominately blues music. He later toured for a while with Buddahead. In 2000, he joined his brother and sister as founder members of Trampled Under Foot. When they won the 2008 International Blues Challenge, Nick Schnebelen was granted the Albert King Award as the competition's best guitarist. After the band's demise Schnebelen became a solo artist, and released the second of two live albums in December 2016, Live in Kansas City. The first of them, Live At Knuckleheads, Vol. 1, was issued in June 2016, and credited to the Nick Schnebelen Band. On the recording and subsequent promotional tour, Schnebelen shared lead vocal duties with Heather Newman.

He continued to play live and attempted to create an amalgam of various blues styles. Schenebelen stated "The old school, new school, even Delta. I bring a lot of different styles together." This all paved the way for the recording and release of Schenebelen's debut solo studio album, Crazy All by Myself. The recording was produced by Tony Braunagel, and guest artists on the collection included the harmonica player Jason Ricci, guitarist Davy Knowles, and pianist Mike Finnigan. The songwriting was done by Schenebelen with Gary Nicholson, Jeff Paris and Dave Duncan. Crazy All by Myself was released on March 1, 2019, via Vizztone and included 13 tracks. Musical backing on the recording was provided by Taj Mahal's Phantom Blues Band.

Schnebelens touring schedule for 2018 encompassed North America and Europe, performing at music festivals, and the annual Legendary Rhythm & Blues Cruise. He also opened dates for George Thorogood. Schnebelen and his band again toured the US in 2019, with Mike Finnigan joining for West Coast dates later in 2019.

In March 2023, upon the release of his latest album, What Key Is Trouble In?, the music magazine Making A Scene interviewed Schnebelen and featured him on its cover.

== Current band members ==
- Nick Schnebelen
- Cliff Moore - bass guitar
- Adam Hagerman - drums

== Discography ==
Year	Title	Label	US Billboard Blues Albums Chart
2016	Live at Knuckleheads, Vol. 1	Vizztone Records	-
2016	Live in Kansas City	Vizztone Records	-
2019	Crazy All by Myself	Vizztone Records	13
2023	What Key Is Trouble In?	Vizztone Records	-
