= Trampled Under Foot (band) =

American musical group

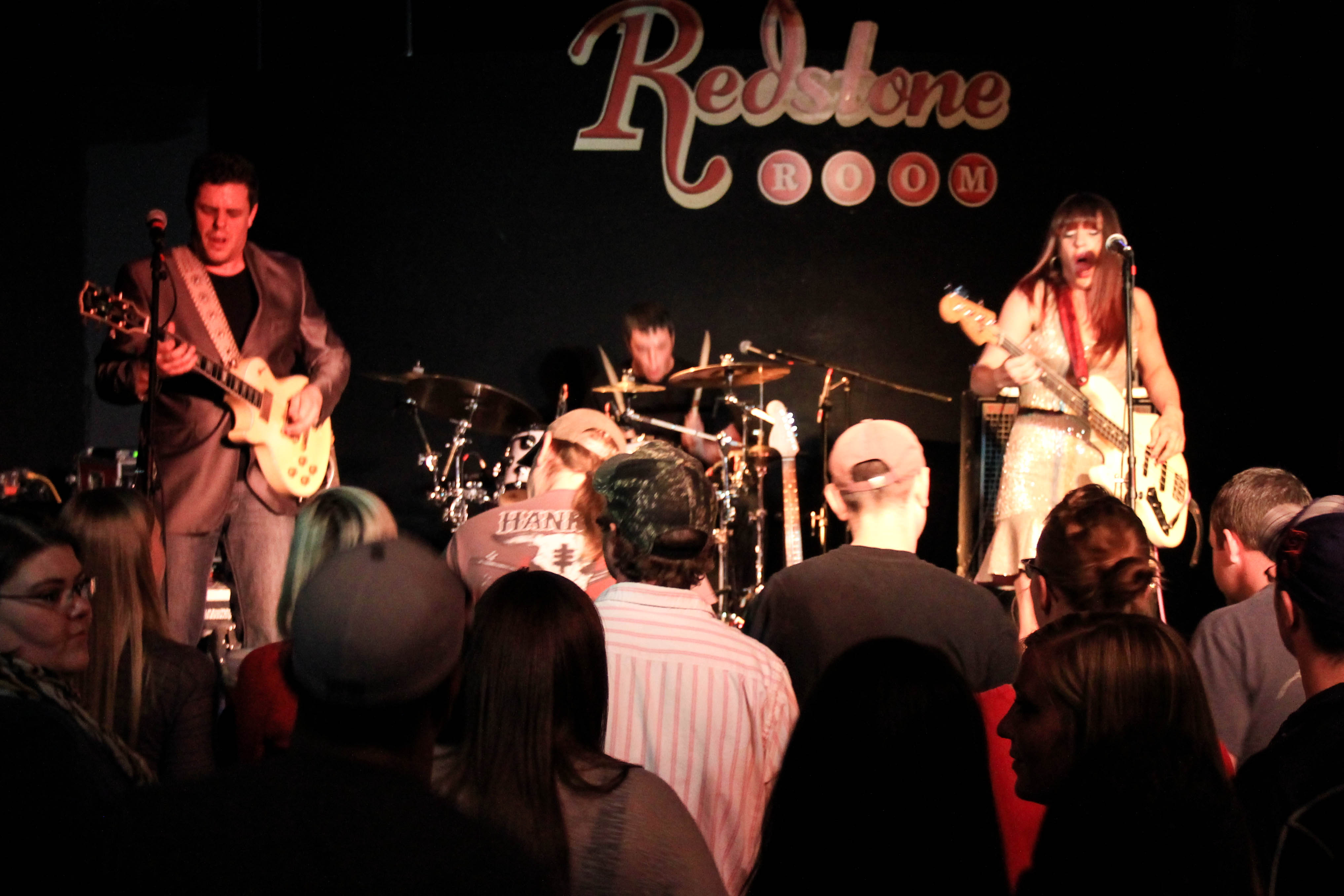

Background information
- Origin: Kansas City, Missouri, United States
- Genres: Soul blues, blues rock, blues
- Years active: 2000–2015
- Label: Various including Telarc
- Past members: Danielle Schnebelen; Nick Schnebelen; Kris Schnebelen; Jan Faircloth; Mike "Shinetop" Sedovic
- Website: Official website

Trampled Under Foot was an American soul blues and blues rock band. The original trio consisted of the siblings Danielle Schnebelen (lead vocals and bass), Nick Schnebelen (guitars and vocals) and Kris Schnebelen (drums and vocals).

Their 2013 album, Badlands, reached number one on the US Billboard Top Blues Albums Chart. Living Blues named the album in the top twenty of their recommended collections of 2013.

== Career ==
Trampled Under Foot was formed in Kansas City, Missouri in 2000. The trio's father, Bob, played blues guitar with a local band named Little Eva, and introduced the threesome to some of their jamming sessions. Between 1999 and 2004, Danielle was originally in a musical outfit known as Fresh Brew, whilst her brother Kris played in various local blues groups. Nick was a brief member of both K-Floor and Buddahead.

Once they were together under the Trampled Under Foot name, their self-titled debut album was released in 2006. The Philadelphia Sessions followed in 2007. May I Be Excused (2008) and Wrong Side of the Blues (2011) were sandwiched either side of their live album, Live at Notodden Blues Festival (2010).

The constant exposure and touring led them in 2013 to signing a recording contract with Telarc, who released Badlands the same year. Tony Braunagel produced both Wrong Side of the Blues and Badlands.

In early 2014, Kris Schnebelen left the band and was replaced by Jan Faircloth and Mike Sedovic.

Trampled Under Foot supported George Thorogood in Montreal, Quebec, Canada, on May 17, 2014.

== Awards ==
Trampled Under Foot was the winner of the International Blues Challenge in 2008.

At the 2014 Blues Music Awards, Trampled Under Foot's album, Badlands, won the 'Contemporary Blues Album of the Year' category. At the same ceremony, Danielle Schnebelen triumphed in the 'Best Instrumentalist – Bass' category. The band was also nominated in the 'Band of the Year' category.

== Band members ==
- Danielle Schnebelen (bass guitar, lead vocals) - (born Danielle Nicole Schnebelen, July, 20) - (2000–2015)
- Kris Schnebelen (drums, vocals) - (born Kristopher R Schnebelen, May 2, 1980) - (2000–2014)
- Nick Schnebelen (guitars, vocals) - (born Nicholas R Schnebelen, September 30, 1978) - (2000–2015)
- Jan Faircloth (drums) - (2014–2015)
- Mike "Shinetop" Sedovic (keyboards) - (2014–2015)

== Discography ==
Year	Title	Label	US Billboard Top Blues Albums Chart
2006	Trampled Under Foot (AKA White Trash)	SoundGate	-
2007	The Philadelphia Sessions	SoundGate	-
2008	May I Be Excused	Blue Edge	-
2010	Live at Notodden Blues Festival	NRK	-
2011	Wrong Side of the Blues	TUF/VizzTone	15
2013	Badlands	Telarc	1
