= Danielle Nicole =

American musician (born 1983)

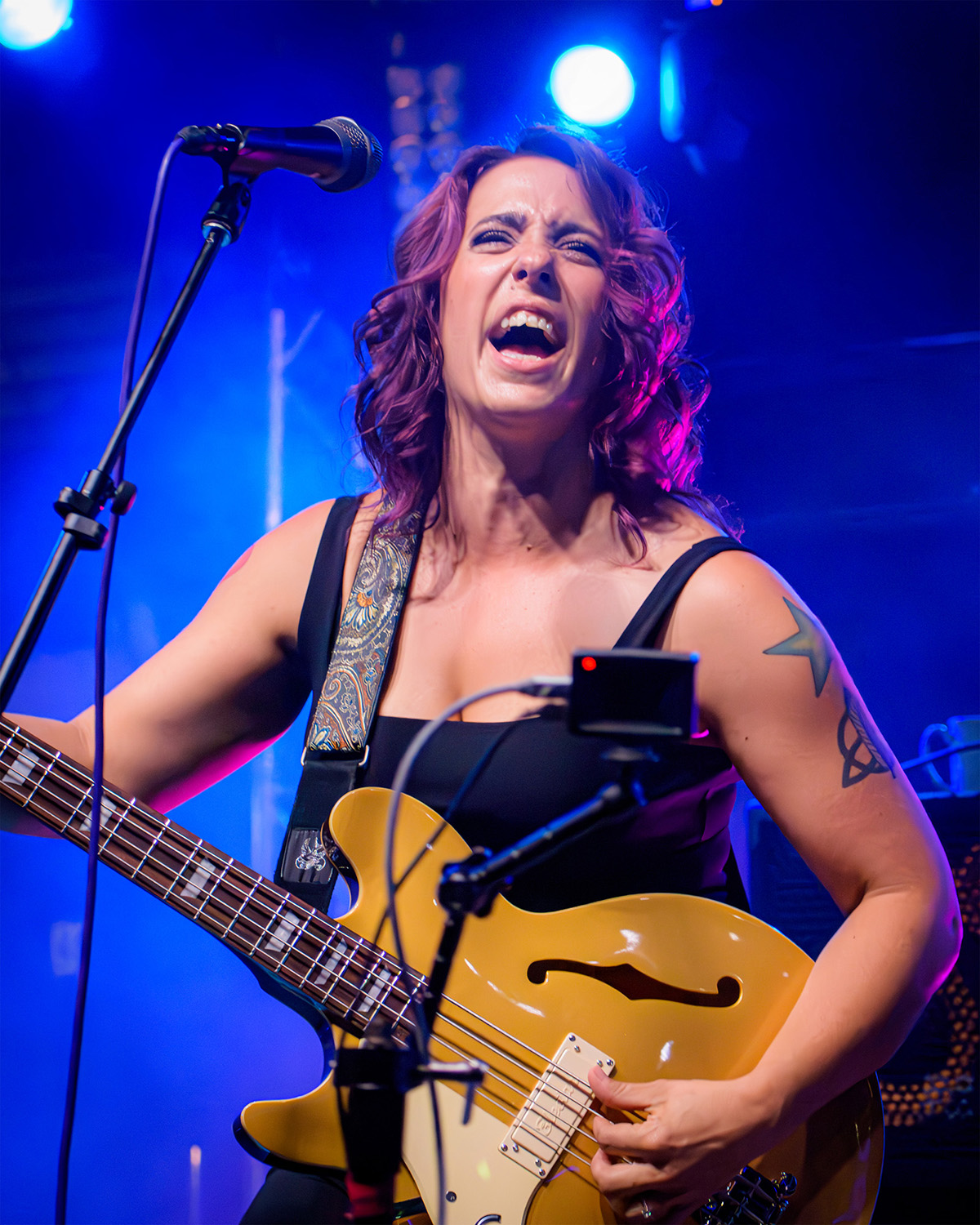

Background information
- Born: Danielle Nicole Schnebelen; July 20, 1983 (age 43); Kansas City, Missouri, United States
- Genres: Soul, blues
- Instruments: Vocals, bass guitar, guitar
- Labels: Concord; Forty Below Records
- Website: daniellenicolemusic.com

Danielle Nicole (born Danielle Nicole Schnebelen, July 20, 1983) is an American blues/soul musician born in Kansas City, Missouri, United States. Her self-titled solo debut EP was released March 10, 2015, on Concord Records. The self-titled EP features Grammy Award-winning producer and guitarist Anders Osborne, Galactic's co-founding drummer Stanton Moore, and keyboardist Mike Sedovic. On February 25, 2015, American Blues Scene premiered the track "Didn't Do You No Good" off the EP.

In May 2019, she received Blues Music Awards for both Contemporary Blues Female Artist and Bass Instrumentalist.

== Background ==
Nicole was previously in the band Trampled Under Foot with her brothers Kris and Nick Schnebelen. At the 2014 Blues Music Awards, Trampled Under Foot's album, Badlands, won the 'Contemporary Blues Album of the Year' category. At the same ceremony, Nicole, under the name of Danielle Schnebelen, triumphed in the 'Best Instrumentalist – Bass' category.

== Career ==
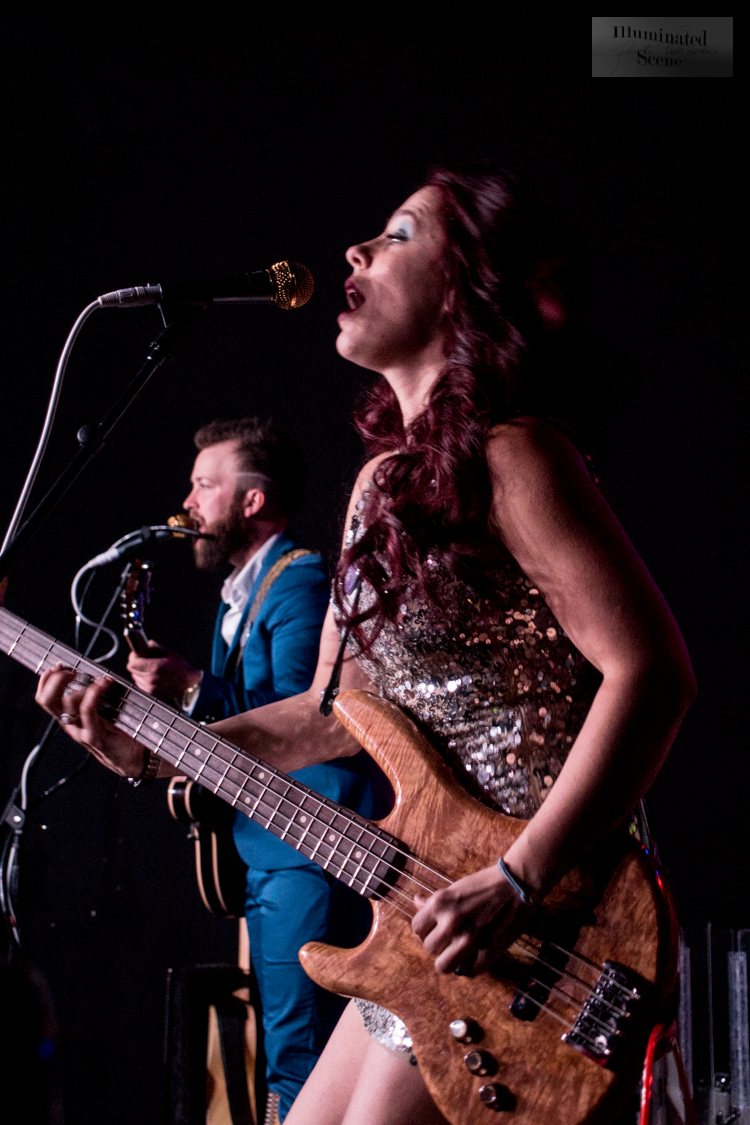
Brandon Miller & Danielle Nicole

In September 2015, her debut album, Wolf Den, was released on Concord Records. It reached number 2 in the Billboard Top Blues Albums chart in October that year. The album was produced by Anders Osborne and Ryan Kingsbury. Writers included Nicole, Anders Osborne, Al Jackson Jr. and Mike Sedovic. Players were Nicole, vocals/bass; Anders Osborne and Luther Dickinson, guitars; Mike Sedovic, keyboards; Stanton Moore, drums.

On March 10, 2018, Nicole's second release, Cry No More, peaked at number 1 in the Billboard Top Blues Albums Chart and included producer/collaborator Tony Braunagel; writers Bill Withers, Prince, Jeff Paris, Tamara Champlin, Maia Sharp, Pam Rose, Anthony LaPeau, John Lardieri, and herself. Players were Nicole, vocals/bass; Nick Schnebelen, Brandon Miller, Walter Trout, Kenny Wayne Shepherd, Monster Mike Welch, Luther Dickinson and Johnny Lee Schell, guitars; Mike Sedovic, Mike Finnigan, and Kelly Finnigan, organs; Tony Braunagel, drums; with Maxanne Lewis and Kudisan Kai as background vocalists. The TV series, S.W.A.T., used "Save Me" from this album on the February 21, 2019, episode of the show.

Nicole, along with Christone "Kingfish" Ingram, did the warm-up show for the Fourth Annual Utah Blues Festival in June, 2018, at the State Room, headlined with her band, Brandon Miller and Kris Schnebelen at the International Blues Festival in Canada in July 2018, and at the Bean Blossom Blues Festival in Indiana in August 2018. She performed with an orchestra her tribute to Etta James and Aretha Franklin at Knuckleheads Saloon in November 2018 and, in February 2019, she was part of a cruise and concert at Knuckleheads for the Michael Ledbetter Foundation.

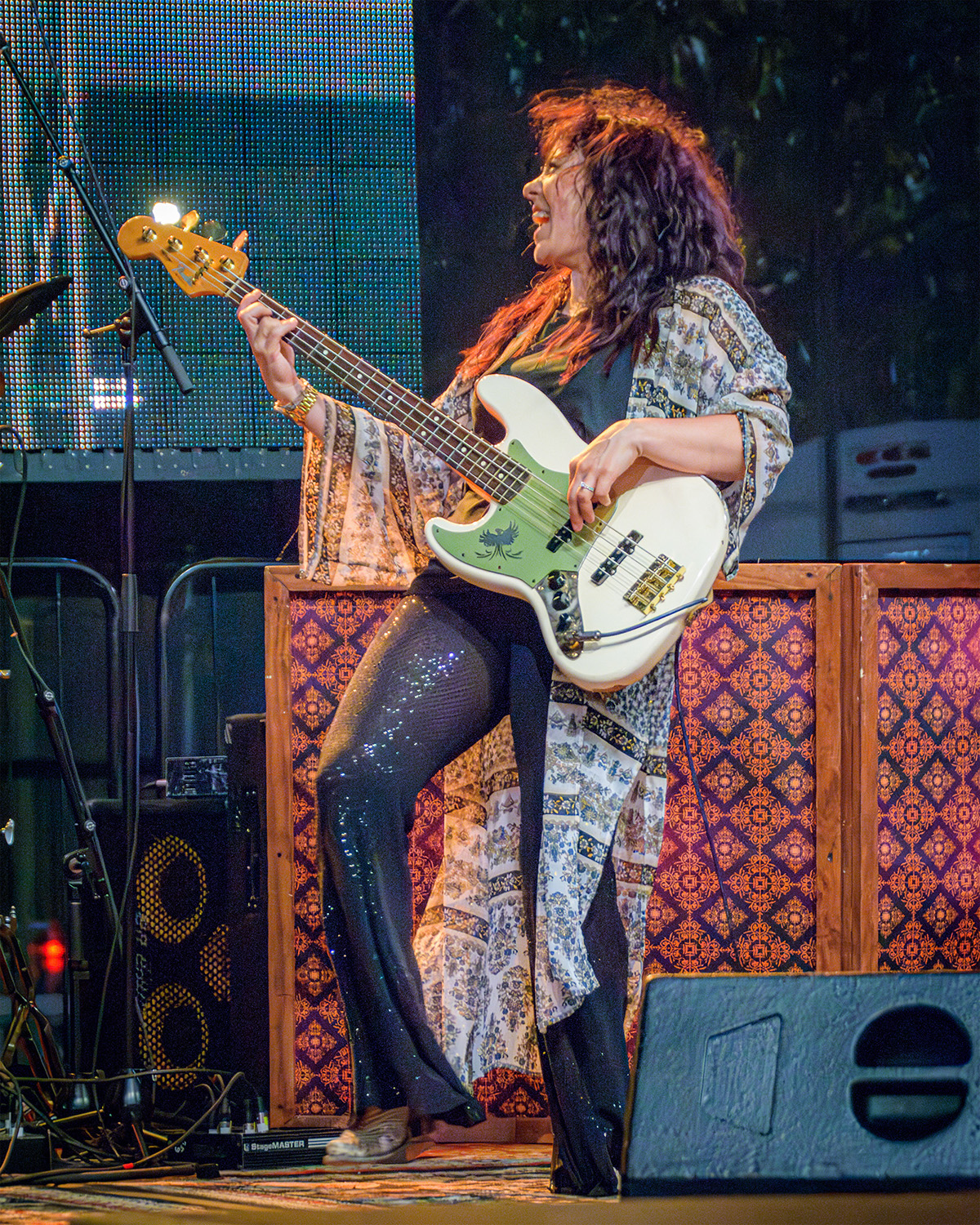
Danielle Nicole at Knuckleheads 2023

Nicole's awards have included the Independent Blues Award for best contemporary CD in , and Top 20 Blues Rock Roots Album. She was inducted into Canada's South Blues Society Hall of Fame.

Cry No More was nominated for a 2019 Grammy Award in Contemporary blues. In May 2019, the album received two Blues Music Awards for Contemporary Blues Female Artist and Bass Instrumentalist and garnered three additional Independent Blues Awards in September 2019 for best R&B Soul CD, Music Video for the album's title track, and R&B Soul Song for Prince's "How Come U Don't Call Me Anymore?".

In June 2021 and May 2022, Nicole was awarded the Blues Music Award for bass instrumentalist. She was on the cover of Blues Blast Magazine and garnished the bass guitar award for 2022 in their magazine in September 2022. She had a featured article, "Lady Sings the Blues" by Bertrand Deveaud, in Rolling Stone, France, June 2022.

In August 2021, Nicole paired with Bonfire Music to oversee the Danielle Nicole Band's booking and tour schedule.

At the 2023 Blues Music Awards, Nicole again garnished the award for 'Instrumentalist – Bass'. and continued to tour in support of her music in the United States and Europe.

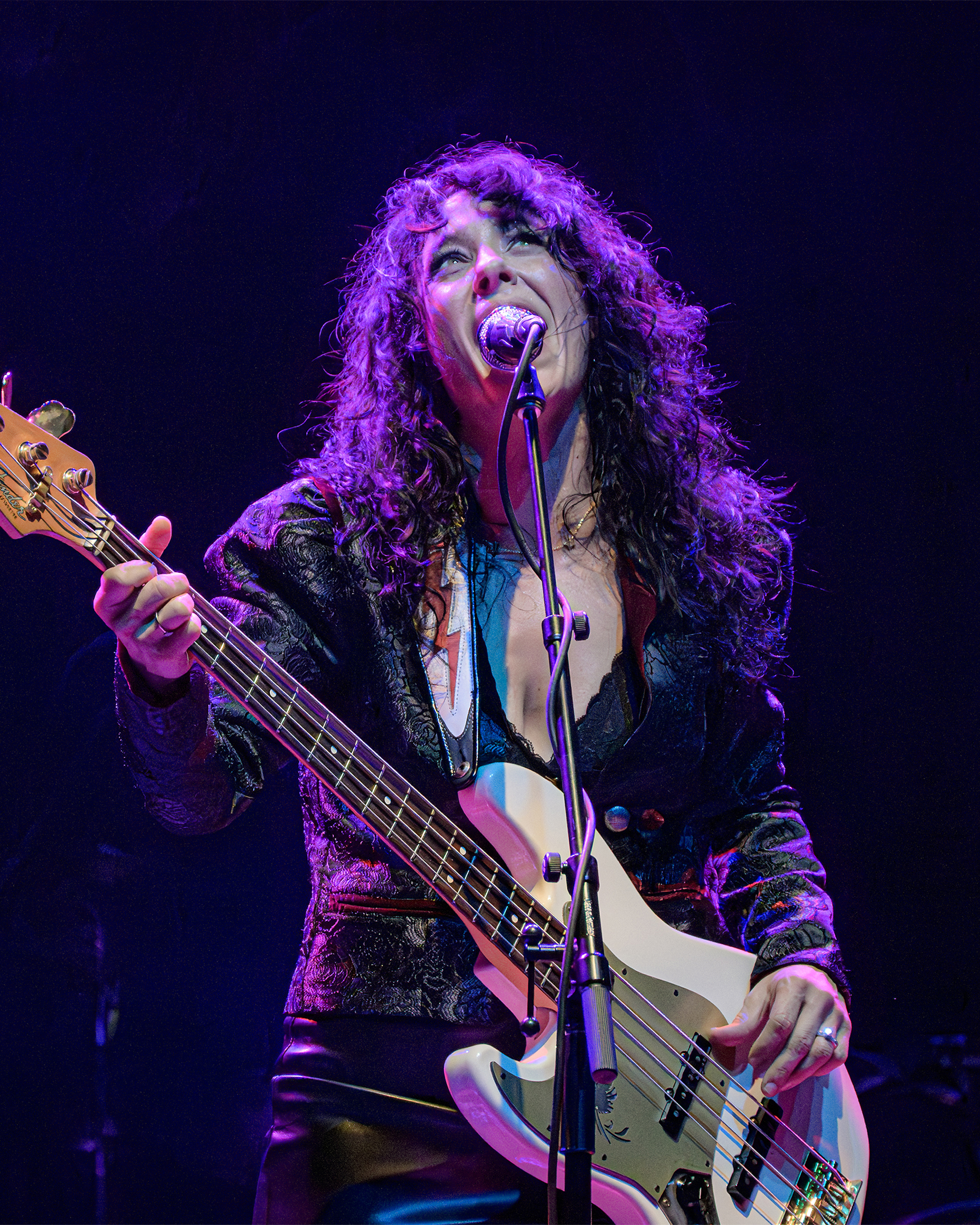
Danielle Nicole 2025

Nicole, Spencer Hutchings, and Davey Nate performed the opening song and the Isham Jones/Gus Kahn tune, "It Had to Be You", in the 2024 movie Which Brings Me To You, directed by Peter Hutchings and starring Lucy Hale, Nat Wolff and John Gallagher Jr. During a scene in the movie, her song "Take It All", written by Nicole with Anders Osborne from her album Wolf Den, can be heard and was mentioned in the ending credits.

On January 26, 2024, following three single preview tracks, saw the release of Nicole's The Love You Bleed. on Forty Below Records; produced by Tony Braunagel, co-produced by Danielle Nicole and mixed by John Porter. It featured Danielle Nicole - vocals & bass; Brandon Miller - guitars, mandolin, vocals; Go-Go Ray – drums, Damon Parker – keys; Stevie Blacke - violin, cello. All but one of the tunes were written by either Nicole or co-written with Brandon Miller. The one cover was penned by Steve Goodman and J. Fred Knobloch, "A Lover Is Forever". In its second week of release The Love You Bleed ranked number 1 on the Billboard Blues Chart. In December 2024, The Love You Bleed was acknowledged as a Top Album of 2024 by Rock & Blues Muse magazine.

On May 9, 2024, Danielle Nicole received the Blues Music Award for best Contemporary Blues Female Artist of 2024 and in September 2024, she was named Bass Guitarist of the year by Blues Blast Magazine. In 2025, at the Blues Music Awards conducted by the Blues Foundation, she earned nominations for both instrumentalist vocals and contemporary blues female artist. and on May 7, 2026, she won in both those categories

Nicole's vocals were featured on Mississippi Heat's 2025 album, Don't Look Back on two tracks: "Shiverin Blues" and "I Ain't Evil" (September 2025 - Delmark Records)

Danielle Nicole was pictured on the cover and interviewed in the January 2026 issue of Blues Music Magazine. and on January 15, 2026, she conducted a Master Class for Bass Guitar at the International Blues Challenge.

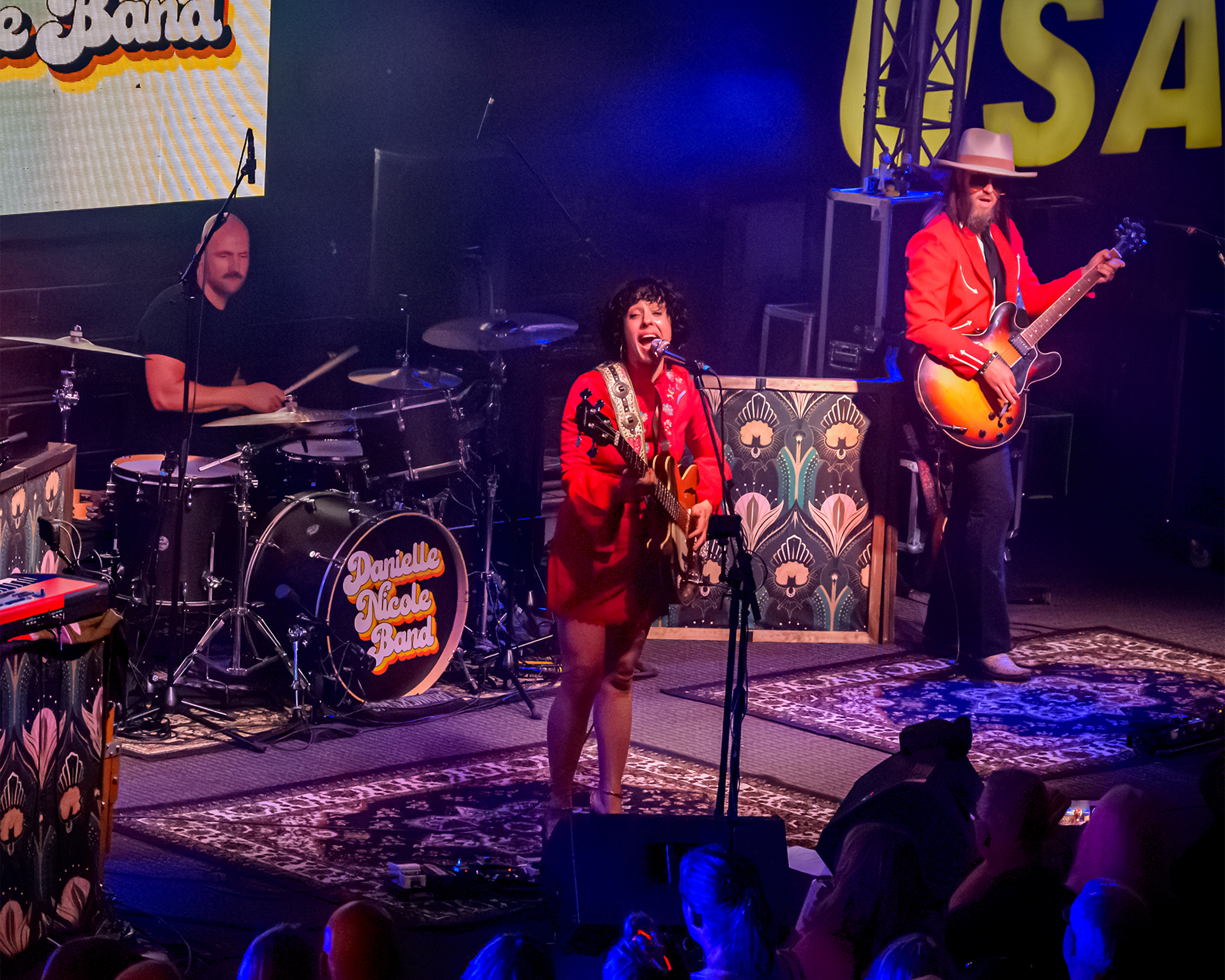
Danielle Nicole Band 2026

Her album Fireflies (produced by Tony Braunagel) premiered on Forty Below Records August 28, 2026, including the previously released singles “Gaslight” “Tug of War” and “Take Me Back.” The songs featured Danielle Nicole on vocals/bass, Brandon Miller guitar/vocals, Jim Pugh on keys, Tony Braunagel on drums/percussion, Maxayne Lewis and Melodye Perry as background vocalists, with guest guitarist Luther Dickinson featured on "Take Me Back". Writing credits for all the tracks were by Nicole and Miller except for two cuts, "Memories" and "Tug of War" where James Pugh joined them as a co-writer. "Radical Love" was written by Jodi Siegel and Jeff Silbar. Also included were two Bill Withers’s compositions "The Same Love That Makes Me Laugh" and "Dreams".

== Discography ==
=== EPs ===
- Danielle Nicole (March 10, 2015)

=== Albums ===
- Wolf Den (September 15, 2015)
- Live at the Gospel Lounge (May 22, 2017)
- Cry No More (February 23, 2018)
- The Love You Bleed (January 26, 2024)
- Fireflies (August 28, 2026)

=== Singles ===
- "Make Love" (October 2023)
- "How Did We Get to Goodbye" (December 2023)
- "Love on My Brain" (January 2024)
- "Gaslight" (April 2026)
- "Tug of War" (May 2026)
- "Take Me Back" featuring Luther Dickinson (July 2026)

== Danielle Nicole (EP) ==
Danielle Nicole

EP by Danielle Nicole
- Released: March 10, 2015
- Label: Concord Records

Danielle Nicole chronology
Danielle Nicole (2015)	Wolf Den (2015)

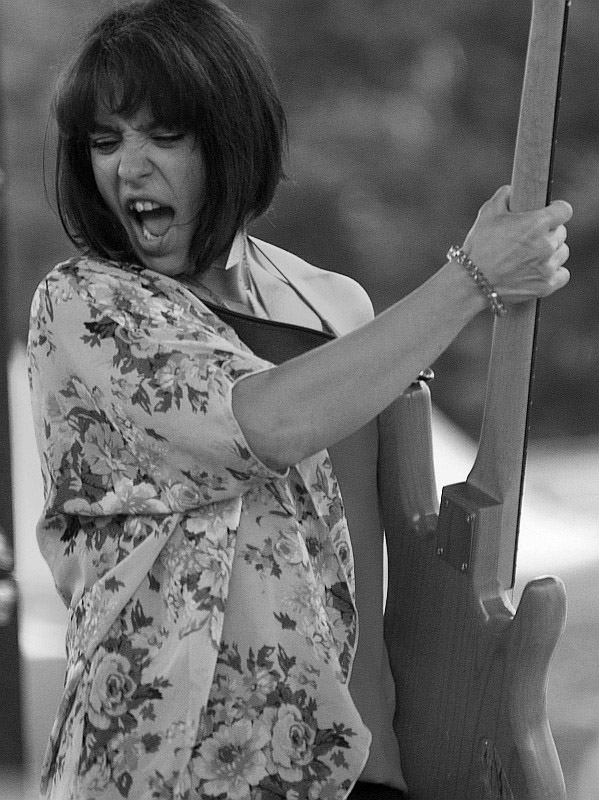
Danielle Nicole

Danielle Nicole is the first studio release by American singer-songwriter Nicole. It was released on March 10, 2015. The studio tracks were recorded in New Orleans, while the last two tracks were recorded live at Kansas City's KTBG-The Bridge 90.9 radio station.

=== Critical reception ===
Writing for Blues Blast magazine, Rex Bartholomew said that the EP "provided a great sound bite of what [Nicole] can do on her own, and it is a very nice piece of work."

=== Track listing ===
Danielle Nicole track listing
No.	Title	Length
1.	"You Only Need Me When You're Down"	2:44
2.	"Starvin' for Love"	3:30
3.	"Didn't Do You No Good"	4:17
4.	"Wandering Heart"	5:03
5.	"You Only Need Me When You're Down (Live from the Bridge 90.9)"	2:13
6.	"Don't Think Twice It's Alright (Live from the Bridge 90.9)"	4:09
Total length:		22:00

=== Personnel ===
- Danielle Nicole – vocals, bass
- Anders Osbourne – guitar
- Mike Sedovic – keyboards
- Stanton Moore – drums
