= Bad Company discography =

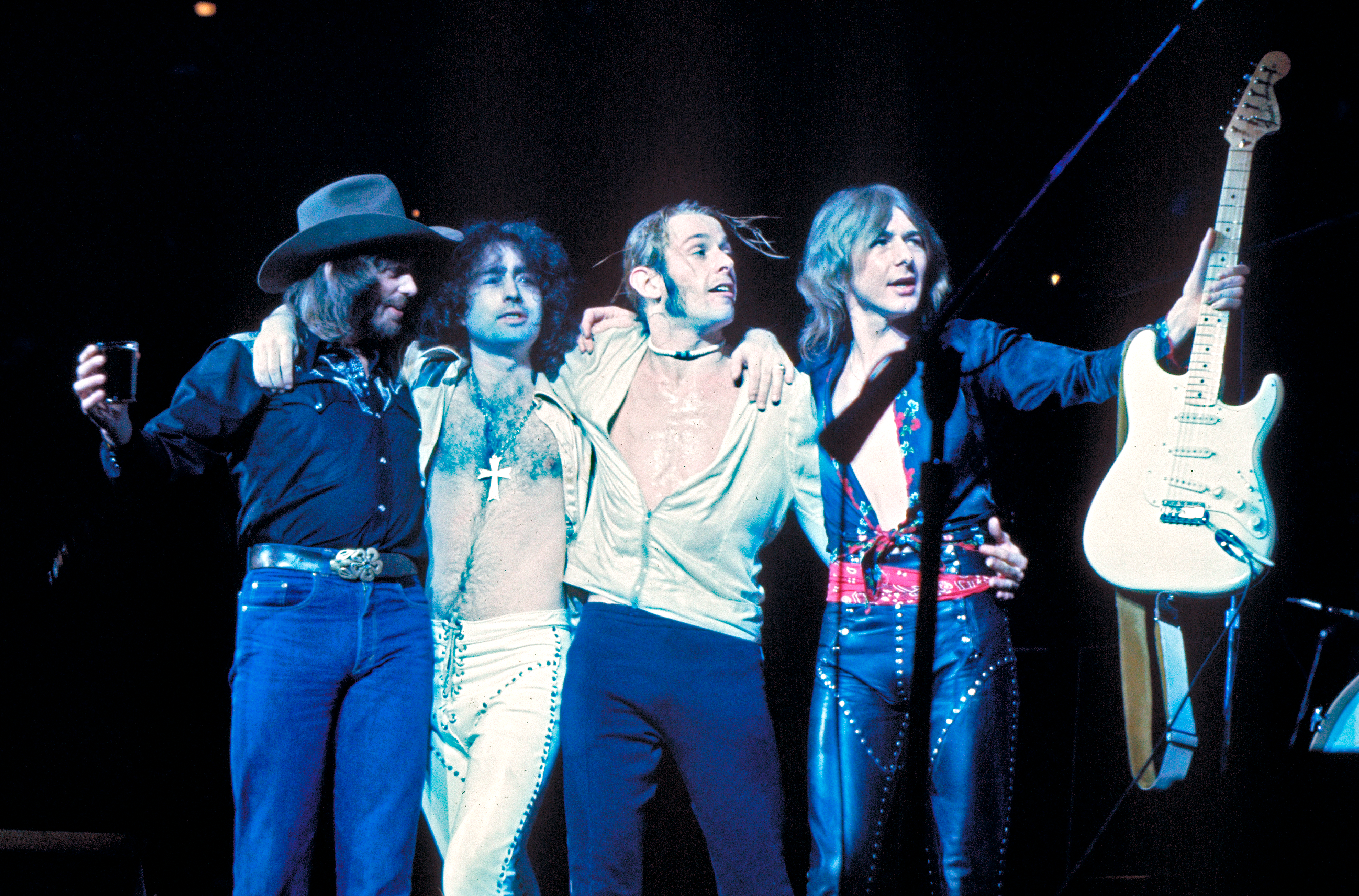
- Bad Company in 1976.
- Studio albums: 12
- Live albums: 5
- Singles: 29
- Music videos: 6

The discography of Bad Company consists of 12 studio albums, and 6 live albums. Additionally, they have released 29 singles and 6 music videos.

Although they were an English band, Bad Company had more success in the United States than in the United Kingdom. Four of their albums were certified Gold by the British Phonographic Industry, while another four other albums were certified Multi-Platinum by the Recording Industry Association of America. Bad Company's most successful album was their 1974 debut, Bad Company. It was a Number One album on the Billboard 200 and also made the Top 3 on the UK Albums Chart. This album featured their biggest hit, "Can't Get Enough", which is their only Top 5 single on the Billboard Hot 100 and their highest-charting single on the UK Singles Chart, where it reached #15 in 1974.

== Albums ==
=== Studio albums ===
Year	Album details	Peak chart positions										Certifications (sales threshold)
Year	Album details	UK	AUS	CAN	FRA	GER	NLD	NOR	NZ	SWE	US	Certifications (sales threshold)
1974	Bad Company: Release date: May 24, 1974; Label: Island, Swan Song	3	6	1	—	45	—	17	27	—	1	UK: Gold; US: 5× Platinum
1975	Straight Shooter: Release date: March 28, 1975; Label: Island, Swan Song	3	8	3	13	47	19	6	13	—	3	UK: Gold; US: 3× Platinum; CAN: Gold
1976	Run with the Pack: Release date: January 30, 1976; Label: Island, Swan Song	4	9	13	19	—	11	11	32	23	5	UK: Gold; US: Platinum
1977	Burnin' Sky: Release date: March 3, 1977; Label: Island, Swan Song	17	15	16	—	—	14	45	32	32	15	US: Gold
1979	Desolation Angels: Release date: March 7, 1979; Label: Swan Song	10	27	6	29	—	27	7	32	9	3	AUS: Gold; US: 2× Platinum
1982	Rough Diamonds: Release date: August 12, 1982; Label: Swan Song	15	63	26	—	61	—	—	32	—	26	
1986	Fame and Fortune: Release date: October 1986; Label: Atlantic	—	—	—	—	—	—	—	—	—	106	
1988	Dangerous Age: Release date: August 15, 1988; Label: Atco	—	—	84	—	—	—	—	—	—	58	US: Gold
1990	Holy Water: Release date: June 12, 1990; Label: Atco	—	—	41	—	—	—	—	—	—	35	US: Platinum; CAN: Gold
1992	Here Comes Trouble: Release date: September 22, 1992; Label: Atco	—	—	37	—	—	—	—	—	—	40	US: Gold; CAN: Gold
1995	Company of Strangers: Release date: June 6, 1995; Label: East West	—	—	—	—	—	—	—	—	—	159	
1996	Stories Told & Untold: Release date: October 15, 1996; Label: East West	—	—	—	—	—	—	—	—	—	—	
"—" denotes releases that did not chart

=== Live albums ===
Year	Album details	Peak positions			Certifications (sales threshold)
Year	Album details	US	GER	US Rock	Certifications (sales threshold)
1993	The Best of Bad Company Live: Release date: November 16, 1993; Label: Atlantic Records	—	—	—	
2002	In Concert: Merchants of Cool: Release date: May 21, 2002; Label: Sanctuary Records	—	—	—	US: Gold (DVD); UK: Gold
2006	Live in Albuquerque 1976: Release date: August 8, 2006; Label: Cleopatra Records	—	—	—	
2010	Hard Rock Live: Release date: February 9, 2010; Label: Image Entertainment	—	—	—	
2011	Live at Wembley: Release date: June 27, 2011; Label: Eagle	—	—	—	
2016	Live in Concert 1977 & 1979: Release date: April 29, 2016; Label: Rhino	166	85	17	
2018	Live at Red Rocks: Release date: January 11, 2018; Label: BMG	—	—	—	

=== Compilation albums ===
Year	Album details	Peak positions			Certifications (sales threshold)
Year	Album details	AUS	US	Hard Rock	Certifications (sales threshold)
1985	10 from 6: Release date: December 1985; Label: Atlantic Records	68	137	—	UK: Gold; US: 2× Platinum
1999	The 'Original' Bad Co. Anthology: Release date: March 23, 1999; Label: Atlantic Records	—	189	—	UK: Silver
2008	The Hits: Release date: April 10, 2008; Label: Sbme Special Mkts.	—	—	—	
2011	Extended Versions: Release date: April 26, 2011; Label: Sbme Special Mkts.	—	82	4	
2015	Rock 'n' Roll Fantasy: The Very Best of Bad Company: Release date: September 25, 2015; Label: Atlantic Records	—	—	25	
2018	An Introduction to Bad Company: Release date: March 2, 2018; Label: Rhino Records	—	—	—	
2019	The Swan Song Years 1974-1982: Release date: July 18, 2019; Label: Rhino Records	—	—	—	

== Singles ==
Year	Single	Peak chart positions							Certifications (sales threshold)	Album
Year	Single	UK	CAN	NZ	US	US Main	US Pop	AUS	Certifications (sales threshold)	Album
1974	"Can't Get Enough"	15	3	—	5		—	22		Bad Company
1975	"Movin' On"	—	30	—	19		—	—		Bad Company
1975	"Good Lovin' Gone Bad"	31	48	—	36		—	93		Straight Shooter
1975	"Feel Like Makin' Love"	20	5	2	10		—	—		Straight Shooter
1976	"Run with the Pack"	—	—	—	—		—	—		Run with the Pack
1976	"Young Blood"	—	9	—	20		—	—		Run with the Pack
1976	"Honey Child"	—	—	—	59		—	—		Run with the Pack
1977	"Everything I Need"	—	—	—	—		—	41		Burnin' Sky
1977	"Burnin' Sky"	—	73	—	78		—	—		Burnin' Sky
1979	"Rock 'n' Roll Fantasy"	—	16	—	13		—	65	US: Gold	Desolation Angels
1979	"Gone, Gone, Gone"	—	55	—	56		—	—		Desolation Angels
1982	"Electricland"	—	—	—	74	2	—	—		Rough Diamonds
1982	"Racetrack"	—	—	—	—	39	—	—		Rough Diamonds
1986	"This Love"	—	—	12	85	12	—	—		Fame and Fortune
1987	"That Girl"	—	—	—	—	—	—	—		Fame and Fortune
1987	"Fame and Fortune"	—	—	—	—	37	—	—		Fame and Fortune
1988	"No Smoke Without a Fire"	—	—	—	—	4	—	—		Dangerous Age
1988	"One Night"	—	—	—	—	9	—	—		Dangerous Age
1989	"Shake It Up"	—	—	—	82	9	—	—		Dangerous Age
1989	"Bad Man"	—	—	—	—	20	—	—		Dangerous Age
1990	"Can't Get Enough" (re-issue)	88	—	—	—	—	—	—		—
1990	"Holy Water"	—	56	—	89	1	—	—		Holy Water
1990	"Boys Cry Tough"	—	—	—	—	3	—	—		Holy Water
1990	"Stranger Stranger"	—	—	—	—	9	—	—		Holy Water
1990	"If You Needed Somebody"	—	51	18	16	2	—	—		Holy Water
1991	"Walk Through Fire"	—	34	—	28	14	—	—		Holy Water
1992	"How About That"	—	17	—	38	1	26	—		Here Comes Trouble
1992	"This Could Be the One"	—	48	—	87	21	—	—		Here Comes Trouble
1992	"Here Comes Trouble"	—	—	—	—	28	—	—		Here Comes Trouble
1995	"Down and Dirty"	—	—	—	—	17	—	—		Company of Strangers
1999	"Hey Hey" (promo)	—	—	—	—	15	—	—		The 'Original' Bad Co. Anthology
1999	"Hammer of Love" (promo)	—	—	—	—	23	—	—		The 'Original' Bad Co. Anthology
2002	"Joe Fabulous"	—	—	—	—	—	—	—		In Concert: Merchants of Cool
"—" denotes releases that did not chart.

== Music videos ==
Year	Video	Director
1974	"Can't Get Enough"	
1975	"Feel Like Makin' Love" (live)	
1975	"Good Lovin' Gone Bad"	
1986	"This Love"	
1988	"No Smoke Without Fire"	Mark Romanek
1988	"One Night"	Nigel Dick
1989	"Shake It Up"	Peter Christopherson
1990	"Holy Water"	
1990	"If You Needed Somebody"	Jim Hershleder
1992	"How About That"	
