= Rock 'n' Roll Fantasy: The Very Best of Bad Company =

Greatest hits album by Bad Company
- Released: 27 October 2015
- Recorded: November 1973 – November 1982
- Genre: Hard rock, blues rock
- Length: 79:16
- Label: Atlantic; Swan Song
- Producer: Paul Rodgers for Bad Company

Bad Company chronology
Extended Versions (2011)	Rock 'n' Roll Fantasy: The Very Best of Bad Company (2015)	An Introduction to Bad Company (2018)

Professional ratings
Review scores
Source	Rating
AllMusic	4.5/5 stars
Classic Rock	4/5 stars

Rock 'n' Roll Fantasy: The Very Best of Bad Company is a compilation album released by Bad Company in 2015 on Atlantic Records. The 19-track collection spans 1974 through 1982 and features many of the group's best-known songs, like "Can't Get Enough", "Feel Like Makin' Love" and "Rock 'n' Roll Fantasy".

The release includes previously unreleased alternate versions of "Easy on My Soul" and "See the Sunlight". Both of these are different versions than the ones that appeared on the deluxe editions of Bad Company and Straight Shooter, respectively.

== Track listing ==
No.	Title	Writer(s)	Original release	Length
1.	"Can't Get Enough" (Single Edit)	Mick Ralphs	Bad Company (1974)	3:31
2.	"Bad Company"	Paul Rodgers, Simon Kirke	Bad Company	4:48
3.	"Movin' On"	Ralphs	Bad Company	3:24
4.	"Ready for Love" (Mott the Hoople cover)	Ralphs	Bad Company	5:02
5.	"Easy on My Soul"	Rodgers	Previously unreleased*	4:16
6.	"Good Lovin' Gone Bad"	Ralphs	Straight Shooter (1975)	3:37
7.	"Feel Like Makin' Love"	Rodgers, Ralphs	Straight Shooter	5:14
8.	"Shooting Star"	Rodgers	Straight Shooter	6:19
9.	"Weep No More"	Kirke	Straight Shooter	4:02
10.	"See the Sunlight"	Rodgers	Previously unreleased	4:04
11.	"Live for the Music"	Ralphs	Run with the Pack (1976)	3:59
12.	"Simple Man"	Ralphs	Run with the Pack	3:38
13.	"Honey Child"	Rodgers, Ralphs, Kirke, Boz Burrell	Run with the Pack	3:17
14.	"Run with the Pack" (Single Edit)	Rodgers	Run with the Pack	3:35
15.	"Burnin' Sky"	Rodgers	Burnin' Sky (1977)	5:09
16.	"Rock 'n' Roll Fantasy"	Rodgers	Desolation Angels (1979)	3:18
17.	"Rhythm Machine"	Kirke, Burrell	Desolation Angels	3:47
18.	"Gone, Gone, Gone"	Burrell	Desolation Angels	3:49
19.	"Electricland" (Single Edit)	Rodgers	Rough Diamonds	4:26
Total length:				79:16

The version of "Easy on My Soul" present here is different from the one previously released on the "Movin' On" single.

== Personnel ==
Bad Company

- Paul Rodgers – vocals, rhythm guitar, piano
- Mick Ralphs – guitar, keyboards on "Ready for Love"
- Boz Burrell – bass
- Simon Kirke – drums

Production

- Produced by Paul Rodgers for Bad Company

== Charts ==
Chart (2015)	Peak position
Portuguese Albums (AFP)	50
US Top Hard Rock Albums (Billboard)	25

Chart (2019)	Peak position
Scottish Albums (OCC)	78
