= List of Bad Company band members =

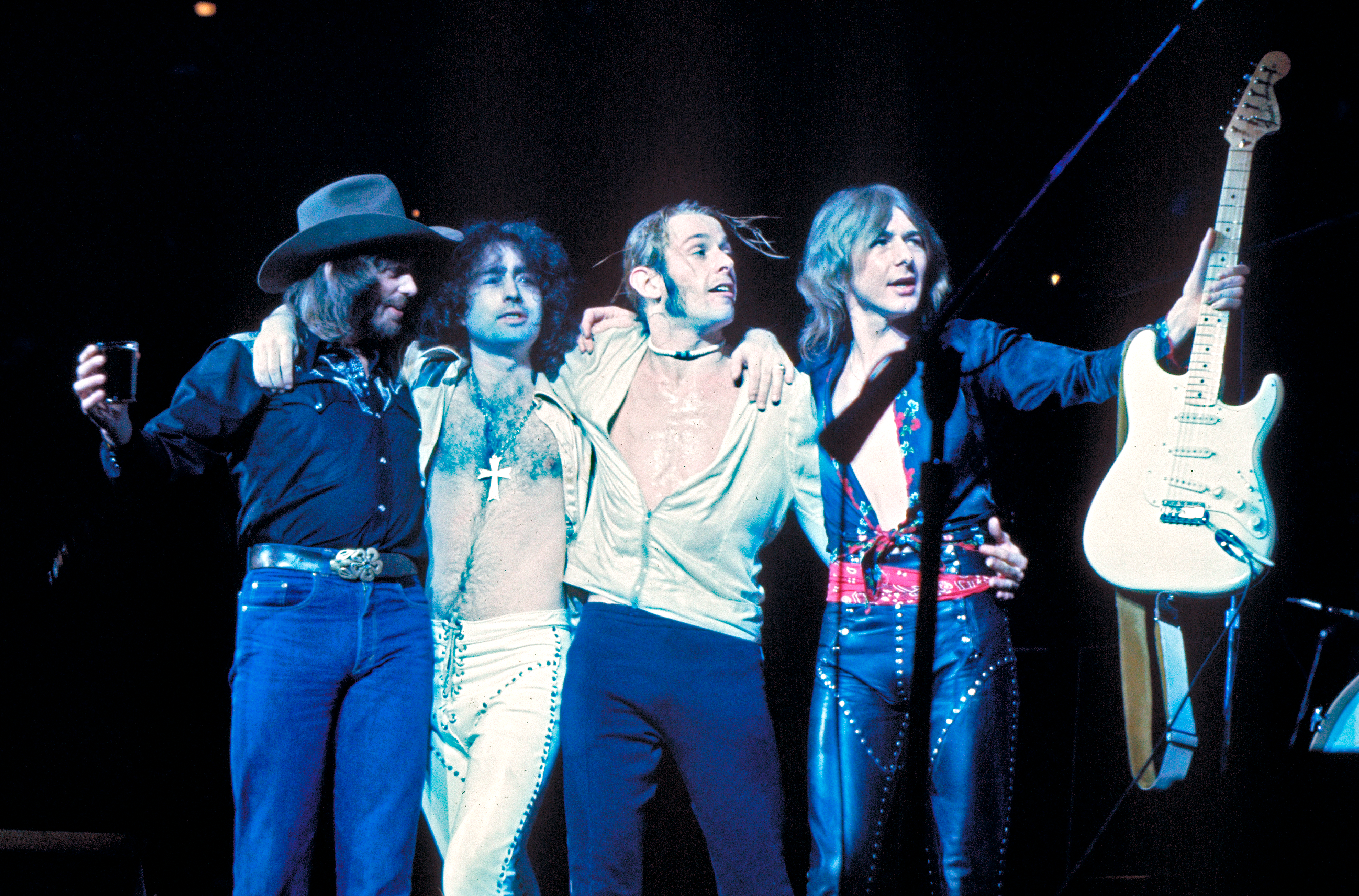
Bad Company in 1976.

Bad Company were an English hard rock band from London. Formed in 1973, the group originally featured vocalist, rhythm guitarist and keyboardist Paul Rodgers, lead guitarist Mick Ralphs, bassist Boz Burrell and drummer Simon Kirke. The band's final lineup featured constant member Kirke, Rodgers (absent between 1986 and 1998), guitarist Howard Leese (who joined 2008), and bassist Todd Ronning (who joined 2012).

== History ==
=== 1973–1999 ===
Bad Company were formed in late 1973 by former Free vocalist Paul Rodgers and drummer Simon Kirke, alongside former Mott the Hoople guitarist Mick Ralphs and former King Crimson bassist Raymond "Boz" Burrell. The band were active with their initial lineup until 1982, during which time they released six studio albums that brought them critical and commercial success. After recording sessions for Rough Diamonds led to arguments and confrontations between band members, particularly Rodgers and Burrell, the vocalist left Bad Company and the group disbanded.

In 1986, Ralphs and Kirke began working together on a new project with former Ted Nugent band vocalist Brian Howe. The group was later branded Bad Company at the request of their label Atlantic Records, with Steve Price performing on Fame and Fortune before Burrell returned for the European tour. Gregg Dechert was also added to the touring lineup on keyboards and rhythm guitar. Burrell left after the European tour, with Price returning for the American tour. Price played bass on the album 'Dangerous Age' and completed the American tour before leaving the band in 1990. in 1988, Dechert was replaced on tour by Larry Oakes. Paul Cullen joined on bass after the release of Holy Water in 1990, while Dave "Bucket" Colwell joined on second guitar. Geoff Whitehorn substituted for Ralphs during the tour.

Colwell remained part of the touring lineup in 1992 alongside new bassist Rick Wills, with both featured on the live release What You Hear Is What You Get. In the summer of 1994, Howe left Bad Company and was replaced by Robert Hart. The group released Company of Strangers the following year, on which Colwell and Wills were credited as full band members. In late 1998, Rodgers and Burrell returned for a reunion of the original lineup of Bad Company, recording four new tracks and touring throughout 1999. After the tour, the group disbanded again.

=== Since 2001 ===
A third reformation of Bad Company took place in the spring of 2001, with Rodgers and Kirke joined by Colwell and Wills. Jaz Lochrie replaced Wills in 2002. In 2008, Ralphs joined the pair for a one-off show at Hard Rock Live. Rhythm guitarist Howard Leese and bassist Lynn Sorensen, both members of Rodgers's solo band, completed the lineup. The same lineup returned for a North American tour the following year, followed by UK and US shows in 2010. Another member of the vocalist's touring band, Todd Ronning, replaced Sorensen in 2012.

For a US tour in mid-2016, Rich Robinson of The Black Crowes substituted for Ralphs, who was "not feeling up for" the shows. He later returned, but was forced to leave later in the year after suffering a stroke. Leese subsequently took over lead guitar. Ralphs died in June 2025.

== Members ==
Image	Name	Years active	Instruments	Release contributions
	Simon Kirke	1973–1982; 1986–1999; 2001–2002; 2008–2019	drums; percussion; backing vocals; occasional lead vocals and guitar	all Bad Company releases
	Mick Ralphs	1973–1982; 1986–1999; 2008–2016 (died 2025)	lead guitar; keyboards; backing vocals	all releases from Bad Company (1974) to Live in Concert 1977 & 1979 (2016), except Merchants of Cool (2002)
	Raymond "Boz" Burrell	1973–1982; 1986; (died 2006)	bass; backing vocals	all releases from Bad Company (1974) to Rough Diamonds (1982); The 'Original' Bad Co. Anthology (1999) – four new recordings; Live in Albuquerque 1976 (2006); Live in Concert 1977 & 1979 (2016)
	Paul Rodgers	1973–1982; 1998–1999; 2001–2002; 2008–2019	lead vocals; rhythm guitar; keyboards; harmonica	all releases from Bad Company (1974) to Rough Diamonds (1982), and from Merchants of Cool (2002) onwards
	Brian Howe	1986–1994 (died 2020)	lead vocals; saxophone	all releases from Fame and Fortune (1986) to What You Hear Is What You Get (1993)
	Steve Price	1985–1989	bass; backing vocals	Fame and Fortune (1986) to Dangerous Age (1988)
	Dave "Bucket" Colwell	1994–1998; 2001–2002 (touring 1991–1994)	guitar (lead 2001–2002, rhythm otherwise); keyboards; backing vocals	What You Hear Is What You Get (1993); Company of Strangers (1995); Stories Told & Untold (1996); Merchants of Cool (2002)
	Rick Wills	1993–1998; 2001 (touring 1992–1994)	bass; backing vocals	What You Hear Is What You Get (1993); Company of Strangers (1995); Stories Told & Untold (1996)
	Robert Hart	1994–1998	lead vocals	Company of Strangers (1995); Stories Told & Untold (1996)
	Jaz Lochrie	2002	bass; backing vocals	Merchants of Cool (2002)
	Howard Leese	2008–2019	guitar (lead from 2016, rhythm and lead before); backing vocals; keyboards	Hard Rock Live (2010); Live at Wembley (2011)
	Lynn Sorensen	2008–2012	bass; backing vocals	Hard Rock Live (2010); Live at Wembley (2011)
	Todd Ronning	2012–2019	bass; backing vocals	none

=== Touring ===
Image	Name	Years active	Instruments	Details
	Gregg Dechert	1986–1987	keyboards; rhythm guitar; backing vocals	Dechert performed on Fame and Fortune and the subsequent touring cycle, ending in late 1987.
	Larry Oakes	1988–1989	keyboards; rhythm guitar; backing vocals	After the release of Dangerous Age, Oakes took over from Dechert as the touring keyboardist.
	Felix Krish	1989–1990; 1992–1993	bass	Holy Water (1990); Here Comes Trouble (1992)
	Paul Cullen	1990–1992	bass	Cullen joined the touring lineup of Bad Company following the release of Holy Water in 1990.
	Geoff Whitehorn	1990–1991	lead guitar; backing vocals	Whitehorn substituted for Ralphs on the Holy Water tour between June 1990 and April 1991.
	Rich Robinson	2016	lead guitar; backing vocals	Robinson substituted for Ralphs during a US tour between May and July 2016 due to illness.

== Lineups ==
Period	Members	Releases
Late 1973 – summer 1982	Paul Rodgers – lead vocals, rhythm guitar, keyboards, harmonica; Mick Ralphs – lead guitar, keyboards, backing vocals; Boz Burrell – bass, backing vocals; Simon Kirke – drums, percussion, backing vocals	Bad Company (1974); Straight Shooter (1975); Run with the Pack (1976); Burnin' Sky (1977); Desolation Angels (1979); Rough Diamonds (1982)
Group inactive 1982–1986
Mid – late 1986	Brian Howe – lead vocals, saxophone; Mick Ralphs – guitar, keyboards, backing vocals; Steve Price - bass, backing vocals; Simon Kirke – drums, percussion, backing vocals	Fame and Fortune (1986)
Late 1986 – early 1987	Brian Howe – lead vocals, saxophone; Mick Ralphs – guitar, keyboards, backing vocals; Boz Burrell – bass, backing vocals; Simon Kirke – drums, percussion, backing vocals	none
Early 1987 – early 1989	Brian Howe – lead vocals, saxophone; Mick Ralphs – guitar, keyboards, backing vocals; Steve Price - bass, backing vocals; Simon Kirke – drums, percussion, backing vocals	Dangerous Age (1988)
early 1989 – mid 1990	Brian Howe – lead vocals, saxophone; Mick Ralphs – guitar, keyboards, backing vocals; Felix Krish - bass, backing vocals; Simon Kirke – drums, percussion, backing vocals	Holy Water (1990)
mid 1990 – early 1992	Brian Howe – lead vocals, saxophone; Mick Ralphs – guitar, keyboards, backing vocals; Paul Cullen - bass, backing vocals; Simon Kirke – drums, percussion, backing vocals	none
early 1992 - early 1993	Brian Howe – lead vocals, saxophone; Mick Ralphs – guitar, keyboards, backing vocals; Felix Krish - bass, backing vocals; Simon Kirke – drums, percussion, backing vocals	Here Comes Trouble (1992)
early 1993 - Summer 1994	Brian Howe – lead vocals, saxophone; Mick Ralphs – guitar, keyboards, backing vocals; Rick Wills - bass, backing vocals; Simon Kirke – drums, percussion, backing vocals	What You Hear Is What You Get (1993)
Summer 1994 – late 1998	Robert Hart – lead vocals; Mick Ralphs – lead guitar, keyboards, backing vocals; Dave Colwell – rhythm guitar, keyboards, backing vocals; Rick Wills – bass, backing vocals; Simon Kirke – drums, percussion, backing vocals	Company of Strangers (1995); Stories Told & Untold (1996)
Late 1998 – summer 1999	Paul Rodgers – lead vocals, rhythm guitar, keyboards, harmonica; Mick Ralphs – lead guitar, keyboards, backing vocals; Boz Burrell – bass, backing vocals; Simon Kirke – drums, percussion, backing vocals	The 'Original' Bad Co. Anthology (1999) (four new studio recordings)
Group inactive 1999–2001
Early – late 2001	Paul Rodgers – lead vocals, rhythm guitar, keyboards, harmonica; Dave Colwell – lead guitar, keyboards, backing vocals; Rick Wills – bass, backing vocals; Simon Kirke – drums, percussion, backing vocals	none
Early – late 2002	Paul Rodgers – lead vocals, rhythm guitar, keyboards, harmonica; Dave Colwell – lead guitar, keyboards, backing vocals; Jaz Lochrie – bass, backing vocals; Simon Kirke – drums, percussion, backing vocals	In Concert: Merchants of Cool (2002)
Group inactive 2002–2008
July 2008 – June 2012	Paul Rodgers – lead vocals, rhythm guitar, keyboards, harmonica; Mick Ralphs – lead guitar, keyboards, backing vocals; Howard Leese – rhythm and lead guitar, backing vocals, keyboards; Lynn Sorensen – bass, backing vocals; Simon Kirke – drums, percussion, backing vocals	Hard Rock Live (2010); Live at Wembley (2011)
June 2012 – November 2016	Paul Rodgers – lead vocals, rhythm guitar, keyboards, harmonica; Mick Ralphs – lead guitar, keyboards, backing vocals; Howard Leese – rhythm and lead guitar, backing vocals, keyboards; Todd Ronning – bass, backing vocals; Simon Kirke – drums, percussion, backing vocals	none
November 2016 – October 2019	Paul Rodgers – lead vocals, rhythm guitar, keyboards, harmonica; Howard Leese – lead guitar, backing vocals, keyboards; Todd Ronning – bass, backing vocals; Simon Kirke – drums, percussion, backing vocals	none
