= The 'Original' Bad Co. Anthology =

The 'Original' Bad Company Anthology

Greatest hits album by Bad Company
- Released: 23 March 1999
- Recorded: Nov 1973 – Nov 1998
- Genre: Hard rock, blues rock
- Length: 137:33
- Label: Elektra; Atlantic Records; Swan Song Records
- Producer: Paul Rodgers for Bad Company

Bad Company chronology
Stories Told & Untold (1996)	The 'Original' Bad Company Anthology (1999)	Merchants of Cool (2002)

Professional ratings
Review scores
Source	Rating
AllMusic	4.5/5 stars

The 'Original' Bad Co. Anthology (also The 'Original' Bad Company Anthology) is a compilation album released by Bad Company in 1999 on Elektra Records. In addition to the band's classic hits, it also features four new songs ― the first since 1982 to feature original lead singer Paul Rodgers ― three B-sides and three previously unreleased outtakes. Technical information was retrieved from the 1999 Edition released by Elektra Records. Most of the songs on the album were previously released on Swan Song Records. The tracks "Tracking Down a Runaway", "Ain't It Good", "Hammer of Love" and "Hey, Hey" were new songs recorded especially for this release. The compilation notably omits the tracks "Young Blood", "Gone, Gone, Gone" and "Electricland", all of which were fairly big hits with Rodgers.

== Track listing ==
Disc One
No.	Title	Writer(s)	Length
1.	"Can't Get Enough" (from Bad Company)	Mick Ralphs	4:14
2.	"Rock Steady" (from Bad Company)	Paul Rodgers	3:45
3.	"Ready for Love" (from Bad Company)	Ralphs	4:58
4.	"Bad Company" (from Bad Company)	Rodgers, Simon Kirke	4:46
5.	"Movin' On" (from Bad Company)	Ralphs	3:19
6.	"Seagull" (from Bad Company)	Rodgers, Ralphs	4:04
7.	"Superstar Woman" (unreleased outtake from Bad Company, later re-recorded for Rodgers's solo album Cut Loose)	Rodgers	5:04
8.	"Little Miss Fortune" (B-side of the single "Can't Get Enough")	Rodgers	3:50
9.	"Good Lovin' Gone Bad" (from Straight Shooter)	Ralphs	3:37
10.	"Feel Like Makin' Love" (from Straight Shooter)	Rodgers, Ralphs	5:11
11.	"Shooting Star" (from Straight Shooter)	Rodgers	6:16
12.	"Deal with the Preacher" (from Straight Shooter)	Rodgers, Ralphs	5:01
13.	"Wild Fire Woman" (from Straight Shooter)	Rodgers, Ralphs	4:33
14.	"Easy on My Soul" (B-side of the single "Movin' On")	Rodgers	4:12
15.	"Whiskey Bottle" (B-side of the single "Good Lovin' Gone Bad")	Rodgers, Ralphs	3:44

Disc Two
No.	Title	Writer(s)	Length
1.	"Honey Child" (from Run with the Pack)	Rodgers, Ralphs, Kirke, Boz Burrell	3:16
2.	"Run with the Pack" (from Run with the Pack)	Rodgers	5:21
3.	"Silver, Blue and Gold" (from Run with the Pack)	Rodgers	5:03
4.	"Do Right by Your Woman" (unreleased alternate version, original version on Run with the Pack)	Rodgers	2:51
5.	"Burnin' Sky" (from Burnin' Sky)	Rodgers	5:03
6.	"Heartbeat" (from Burnin' Sky)	Rodgers	5:03
7.	"Too Bad" (from Burnin' Sky)	Ralphs	3:51
8.	"Smokin' 45" (unreleased outtake from Run with the Pack)	Peter Sinfield, Burrell, Tim Hinckley	3:33
9.	"Rock 'n' Roll Fantasy" (from Desolation Angels)	Rodgers	3:18
10.	"Evil Wind" (from Desolation Angels)	Rodgers	4:20
11.	"Oh, Atlanta" (from Desolation Angels)	Ralphs	4:10
12.	"Rhythm Machine" (from Desolation Angels)	Kirke, Burrell	3:45
13.	"Untie the Knot" (from Rough Diamonds)	Rodgers, Kirke	4:08
14.	"Downhill Ryder" (from Rough Diamonds)	Rodgers	4:13
15.	"Tracking Down a Runaway" (new song recorded 1998)	Rodgers	3:41
16.	"Ain't It Good" (new song recorded 1998)	Ralphs	3:08
17.	"Hammer of Love" (new song recorded 1998)	Rodgers, Cynthia Kereluk	5:23
18.	"Hey, Hey" (new song recorded 1998)	Ralphs	2:49

== Charts ==
Chart (1999)	Peak position
US Billboard 200	189

== Certifications ==
Region	Certification	Certified units/sales
United Kingdom (BPI)	Silver	60,000^{^}
^{^} Shipments figures based on certification alone.

== Technical information ==
- Produced by Paul Rodgers for Bad Company
- Total album time: 137:33 Minutes
