= Hard Rock Live (album) =

Live album by Bad Company
- Released: February 2010
- Recorded: 8 August 2008
- Venue: Hard Rock Live (Hollywood, Florida)
- Genre: Hard rock
- Length: 79:18
- Label: Image Entertainment
- Producer: Jim Rivers

Bad Company chronology
Live in Albuquerque 1976 (2006)	Hard Rock Live (2010)	Live at Wembley (2011)

Hard Rock Live is a live album and video by the English hard rock band Bad Company released in 2010. It was recorded at the Hard Rock Live in Hollywood, Florida on August 8, 2008, and marked the first time original members Paul Rodgers, Mick Ralphs and Simon Kirke had performed together, since their brief reunion in 1999.

The original band members were joined for the tour by former Heart guitarist Howard Leese and bassist Lynn Sorensen, both of whom had previously played live with Rodgers on his solo tours.

== Track listing ==
1. "Bad Company" (Simon Kirke, Paul Rodgers) - 5:48
2. "Honey Child" (Boz Burrell, Kirke, Mick Ralphs, Rodgers) - 3:52
3. "Burnin' Sky" (Rodgers) - 6:07
4. "Gone, Gone, Gone" (Burrell) - 4:41
5. "Run with the Pack" (Rodgers) - 4:33
6. "Live for the Music" (Ralphs) - 5:14
7. "Seagull" (Ralphs, Rodgers) - 4:19
8. "Feel Like Makin' Love" (Ralphs, Rodgers) - 4:56
9. "Movin' On" (Ralphs) - 3:21
10. "Simple Man" (Ralphs) - 4:56
11. "Rock Steady" (Rodgers) - 4:09
12. "Shooting Star" (Rodgers) - 5:47
13. "Can't Get Enough" (Ralphs) - 4:31
14. "Rock 'n' Roll Fantasy" (Rodgers) - 4:35
15. "Ready for Love" (Ralphs; Mott the Hoople cover) - 8:28
16. "Good Lovin' Gone Bad" (Ralphs) - 4:01

Between "Honey Child" and "Burnin' Sky", they do another song called "Sweet Lil' Sister"

== Personnel ==
- Paul Rodgers – lead vocals, piano, guitar
- Mick Ralphs – lead guitar, piano
- Howard Leese – guitar, background vocals
- Lynn Sorensen – bass, background vocals
- Simon Kirke – drums
- Jim Rivers – producer
