= 10 from 6 =

Greatest hits album by Bad Company
- Released: December 1985
- Recorded: 1973–1981
- Genre: Hard rock
- Length: 46:50
- Label: Atlantic
- Producer: Bad Company

Bad Company chronology
Rough Diamonds (1982)	10 from 6 (1985)	Fame and Fortune (1986)

Professional ratings
Review scores
Source	Rating
AllMusic	4.5/5 stars
Christgau's Record Guide	B+

10 from 6 (also known as 10/6) is a compilation album released by English supergroup Bad Company in December 1985 on Atlantic Records label. All the songs on the album were previously released on Swan Song Records, a record label begun by Led Zeppelin in 1974. The title refers to the album's 10 songs taken from the six albums Bad Company had recorded to that time, though no songs from Burnin' Sky appear on the album.

== Track listing ==
Side One
No.	Title	Writer(s)	Original Album	Length
1.	"Can't Get Enough"	Mick Ralphs	Bad Company	4:16
2.	"Feel Like Makin' Love"	Paul Rodgers, Ralphs	Straight Shooter	5:14
3.	"Run with the Pack"	Rodgers	Run with the Pack	5:24
4.	"Shooting Star"	Rodgers	Straight Shooter	6:18
5.	"Movin' On"	Ralphs	Bad Company	3:23

Side Two
No.	Title	Writer(s)	Original Album	Length
1.	"Bad Company"	Rodgers, Simon Kirke	Bad Company	4:50
2.	"Rock 'n' Roll Fantasy"	Rodgers	Desolation Angels	3:19
3.	"Electricland"	Rodgers	Rough Diamonds	5:29
4.	"Ready for Love"	Ralphs	Bad Company	5:02
5.	"Live for the Music"	Ralphs	Run with the Pack	3:49

== Personnel ==
Per liner notes

- Paul Rodgers – vocals, second guitar, piano, producer
- Mick Ralphs – guitar, keyboards on "Ready for Love", producer
- Boz Burrell – bass, producer
- Simon Kirke – drums, producer

== Production ==
- Aubrey Powell Productions – sleeve design
- Richard Evans – sleeve design
- Barry Diament – mastering

== Charts ==
Weekly chart performance for 10 from 6
Chart (1985)	Peak position
Australian Albums (Kent Music Report)	68
US Billboard 200	137

Chart (2023)	Peak position
Hungarian Physical Albums (MAHASZ)	29

== Certifications ==
Region	Certification	Certified units/sales
United Kingdom (BPI)	Gold	100,000^{^}
United States (RIAA)	2× Platinum	2,000,000^{^}
^{^} Shipments figures based on certification alone.
