= Live in Concert 1977 & 1979 =

Live album by Bad Company
- Released: 29 April 2016
- Recorded: 23 May 1977, 9 March 1979, 29 June 1979
- Venue: The Summit (Houston, Texas); Wembley Arena (London); Capital Centre
- Genre: Hard rock
- Length: 2:34:54
- Label: Rhino Records
- Producer: Bad Company

Bad Company chronology
Live at Wembley (2011)	Live in Concert 1977 & 1979 (2016)

Live in Concert 1977 & 1979 is a double live album by the English hard rock band Bad Company, released on CD and as an mp3 download in 2016. It is an archival album with recordings taken from two concerts from their tours in 1977 and 1979. Disc one contains material from a concert at The Summit in Houston, Texas on May 23, 1977. Disc 2 contains material from a concert at Wembley Arena in London on March 9, 1979.

== Track listing ==
=== Disc One ===
Recorded on May 23, 1977, at The Summit in Houston, Texas

1. "Burnin' Sky" (Paul Rodgers)
2. "Too Bad" (Mick Ralphs)
3. "Ready for Love" (Ralphs)
4. "Heartbeat" (Rodgers)
5. "Morning Sun" (Rodgers)
6. "Man Needs Woman" (Rodgers)
7. "Leaving You" (Rodgers)
8. "Shooting Star" (Rodgers)
9. "Simple Man" (Ralphs)
10. "Movin' On" (Ralphs)
11. "Like Water" (Rodgers, Machiko Shimizu)
12. Drum solo (Simon Kirke)
13. "Live for the Music" (Ralphs)
14. "Good Lovin' Gone Bad" (Ralphs)
15. "Feel Like Makin' Love" (Ralphs, Rodgers)

=== Disc Two ===
Recorded on March 9, 1979, at Wembley Arena in London except "Hey Joe" recorded on June 26, 1979, at the Capital Centre near Washington, D.C.

1. "Bad Company" (Kirke, Rodgers)
2. "Gone, Gone, Gone" (Boz Burrell)
3. "Shooting Star" (Rodgers)
4. "Rhythm Machine" (Burrell, Kirke)
5. "Oh, Atlanta" (Ralphs)
6. "She Brings Me Love" (Rodgers)
7. "Run with the Pack" (Rodgers)
8. "Evil Wind" (Rodgers)
9. Drum solo (Kirke)
10. "Honey Child" (Burrell, Kirke, Ralphs, Rodgers)
11. "Rock Steady" (Rodgers)
12. "Rock 'n' Roll Fantasy" (Rodgers)
13. "Hey Joe" (Billy Roberts)
14. "Feel Like Makin' Love" (Ralphs, Rodgers)
15. "Can't Get Enough" (Ralphs)

== Personnel ==
- Paul Rodgers – vocals, piano, guitar, harmonica
- Mick Ralphs – lead guitar, piano, background vocals
- Boz Burrell – bass
- Simon Kirke – drums
