= Live at Wembley (Bad Company album) =

Live album by Bad Company
- Released: 18 July 2010 (UK release); 28 June 2011 (US release)
- Recorded: 11 April 2010
- Venue: Wembley Arena (London, England)
- Genre: Hard rock; blues rock
- Length: 1:17:04
- Label: Eagle Records
- Producer: Chris Crawford; Geoff Kempin; Paul M. Green

Bad Company chronology
Hard Rock Live (2010)	Live at Wembley (2010)	Live in Concert 1977 & 1979 (2016)

Live at Wembley is a live album by the English rock band Bad Company, released in 2011. It was recorded on 11 April 2010 during a concert at the Wembley Arena in London, England.

== Track listing ==
=== DVD / Blu-ray / UK 2CD editions ===
1. Can't Get Enough (Mick Ralphs) – 5:02
2. Honey Child (Boz Burrell, Simon Kirke, Ralphs, Paul Rodgers) – 4:03
3. Run with the Pack (Rodgers) – 4:22
4. Burnin' Sky (Rodgers) – 6:28
5. Young Blood (Doc Pomus) – 4:31
6. Seagull (Ralphs, Rodgers) – 4:46
7. Gone, Gone, Gone (Burrell) – 4:28
8. Electricland (Rodgers) – 5:34
9. Simple Man (Ralphs) – 5:31
10. Feel Like Makin' Love (Ralphs, Rodgers) – 6:46
11. Shooting Star (Rodgers) – 7:24
12. Rock 'n' Roll Fantasy (Rodgers) – 4:36
13. Movin' On (Ralphs) – 4:40
14. Ready for Love (Ralphs) – 8:07
15. Bad Company (Kirke, Rodgers) – 7:25
16. Deal with the Preacher (Ralphs, Rodgers) – 5:40

The US CD release excludes "Burnin' Sky" and edited versions of other songs to fit on a single disc.

== Personnel ==
- Paul Rodgers – lead vocals, piano, guitar
- Mick Ralphs – lead guitar, background vocals
- Howard Leese – guitar, background vocals, piano
- Lynn Sorensen – bass, background vocals
- Simon Kirke – drums

== Credits ==
- Producer: Chris Crawford, Geoff Kempin, and Paul M. Green
- Distributor: Eagle Records
- Recording type: Live
- Recording mode: Stereo
- Recorded in London, England, on 11 April 2010
- Release Date: UK 18 July 2010, US 28 June 2011
