= In Concert: Merchants of Cool =

2002 live album and DVD by Bad Company

Live album by Bad Company
- Released: 21 May 2002
- Genre: Hard rock
- Label: Sanctuary
- Producer: Bad Company

Bad Company chronology
The 'Original' Bad Co. Anthology (1999)	In Concert: Merchants of Cool (2002)	Inside Bad Company 1974-1982 (2005)

Professional ratings
Review scores
Source	Rating
Allmusic	3/5 stars

In Concert: Merchants of Cool is a live album and DVD by English hard rock band Bad Company. It was recorded principally at The Paramount Theater, Denver, Colorado and The Grove of Anaheim, Anaheim, California, in January 2002. It features hits from both Bad Company and precursor band Free as well as two new studio tracks, "Joe Fabulous" and "Saving Grace".

It is the band's only album not to feature guitarist Mick Ralphs; longtime session guitarist Dave "Bucket" Colwell, who had previously appeared on the Here Comes Trouble album, plays in Ralphs' place. Additionally, Boz Burrell is replaced on bass by Jaz Lochrie, who previously handled bass duties on Rodgers' solo albums from 1996–2000. The band covers two songs from the Beatles, "Ticket to Ride" and "I Feel Fine" in a medley with "Rock 'n' Roll Fantasy", as well as two by Paul Rodgers' and Simon Kirke's former band Free, "All Right Now" and "Wishing Well" (the latter of which is only included on the DVD).

== Track listing ==
CD version
No.	Title	Writer(s)	Length
1.	"Burnin' Sky"	Paul Rodgers	5:35
2.	"Can't Get Enough"	Mick Ralphs	3:47
3.	"Feel Like Makin' Love"	Ralphs, Rodgers	5:26
4.	"Rock Steady"	Rodgers	3:49
5.	"Movin' On"	Ralphs	3:10
6.	"Deal with the Preacher"	Ralphs, Rodgers	4:34
7.	"Ready for Love"	Ralphs	6:33
8.	"Rock 'n' Roll Fantasy/Ticket to Ride/I Feel Fine"	Rodgers/John Lennon, Paul McCartney	6:29
9.	"All Right Now"	Andy Fraser, Rodgers	6:28
10.	"Bad Company"	Rodgers, Simon Kirke	5:42
11.	"Silver, Blue and Gold"	Rodgers	5:02
12.	"Shooting Star"	Rodgers	6:42
13.	"Joe Fabulous" (new studio recording)	Rodgers	3:39
14.	"Saving Grace" (new studio recording, cover of Paul Rodgers solo song from Now)	Rodgers, Neal Schon, Geoff Whitehorn	4:07

DVD version
No.	Title	Writer(s)	Length
1.	"Burnin' Sky"	Rodgers
2.	"Can't Get Enough"	Ralphs
3.	"Good Lovin' Gone Bad"	Ralphs
4.	"Feel Like Makin' Love"	Ralphs, Rodgers
5.	"Rock Steady"	Rodgers
6.	"Movin' On"	Ralphs
7.	"Seagull"	Ralphs, Rodgers
8.	"Ready for Love"	Ralphs
9.	"Deal with the Preacher"	Ralphs, Rodgers
10.	"Rock 'n' Roll Fantasy/Ticket to Ride/I Feel Fine"	Rodgers/John Lennon, Paul McCartney
11.	"All Right Now"	Fraser, Rodgers
12.	"Wishing Well" (with Slash and Neal Schon)	Rodgers, Kirke, Tetsu Yamauchi, Paul Kossoff, John Bundrick
13.	"Bad Company"	Rodgers, Kirke
14.	"Silver, Blue and Gold"	Rodgers
15.	"Run with the Pack"	Rodgers
16.	"Shooting Star"	Rodgers
17.	"Joe Fabulous" (promo video)	Rodgers

== Personnel ==
- Paul Rodgers – vocals, arranger, guitar, piano
- Dave Colwell – guitar, background vocals
- Jaz Lochrie – bass, background vocals
- Simon Kirke – drums, percussion, background vocals
- Slash – guitar on "Wishing Well"
- Neal Schon – guitar on "Wishing Well"
- Recorded by Chris Mickle, Bud Martin & Justin Peacock.

== Video formats ==
- 1.78:1 Anamorphic widescreen

== Audio formats ==
- Dolby Digital 5.1 Surround (English)
- Dolby Digital 2.0 Stereo (English)
- Running Time: 140 Minutes
- Release Year: 2002
- MPAA Rating: Not Rated

== Charts ==
Chart (2002)	Peak position
UK Independent Albums (OCC)	23
UK Rock & Metal Albums (OCC)	20
US Billboard 200	114

== DVD Certifications ==
Region	Certification	Certified units/sales
United Kingdom (BPI)	Gold	25,000^{^}
United States (RIAA)	Gold	50,000^{^}
^{^} Shipments figures based on certification alone.
