= What You Hear Is What You Get: The Best of Bad Company =

1993 live album by Bad Company

What You Hear Is What You Get: The Best of Bad Company Live

Live album by Bad Company
- Released: 16 November 1993
- Genre: Hard rock
- Length: 71:24
- Label: Atlantic
- Producer: Simon Kirke

Bad Company chronology
Here Comes Trouble (1992)	What You Hear Is What You Get: The Best of Bad Company Live (1993)	Company of Strangers (1995)

Professional ratings
Review scores
Source	Rating
AllMusic	1/5 stars

What You Hear Is What You Get (subtitled The Best of Bad Company Live) is a live album by hard rock band Bad Company, with Brian Howe in place of Paul Rodgers as lead vocalist. Released in 1993, the album covers the 1992 U.S tour, with much of the recording done at various California dates. The band's introduction was done by Ralphs' guitar technician (at that time), Gary Gilmore.

== Track listing ==
1. How About That (Brian Howe, Terry Thomas) – 5:31
2. Holy Water (Howe, Thomas) – 4:27
3. Rock 'n' Roll Fantasy (Paul Rodgers) – 3:11
4. If You Needed Somebody (Howe, Thomas) – 5:12
5. Here Comes Trouble (Howe, Thomas) – 4:00
6. Ready for Love (Mick Ralphs) – 5:25
7. Shooting Star (Rodgers) – 6:28
8. No Smoke Without a Fire (Howe, Thomas) – 5:03
9. Feel Like Makin' Love (Ralphs, Rodgers) – 5:45
10. Take This Town (Howe, Thomas) – 5:15
11. Movin' On (Ralphs) – 3:20
12. Good Lovin' Gone Bad (Ralphs) – 3:49
13. Fist Full of Blisters (Simon Kirke) – 1:00
14. Can't Get Enough (Ralphs) – 4:37
15. Bad Company (Kirke, Rodgers) – 8:15

== Personnel ==
- Brian Howe – lead vocals
- Mick Ralphs – lead guitar, backing vocals
- Dave Colwell – rhythm guitar, backing vocals
- Rick Wills – bass, backing vocals
- Simon Kirke – drums, backing vocals

=== Production ===
- Simon Kirke – production
- Ted Jensen – mastering
- Dave Natale – recording engineer
- John Seymour – assistant engineer
- Dave Wittman – engineer, mixing
