= Live in Albuquerque 1976 =

2006 live album by Bad Company

Live album by Bad Company
- Released: 8 August 2006
- Recorded: 10 March 1976
- Venue: Albuquerque Civic Auditorium, Albuquerque, New Mexico
- Genre: Hard rock
- Label: Cleopatra, Angel Air
- Producer: Mick Ralphs

Bad Company chronology
Inside Bad Company 1974-1982 (2005)	Live in Albuquerque 1976 (2006)	Hard Rock Live (2010)

Professional ratings
Review scores
Source	Rating
AllMusic	4/5 stars

Live in Albuquerque 1976 is a live album by the English hard rock band Bad Company featuring all four original members. The recordings were made by Mick Ralphs, who regularly taped the group's shows in the 1970s, so the band could use them to finely tune their set and performances. The album was released on Angel Air Records in 2006, 30 years after it was recorded. The band did not release an official live album in the 1970s. Mick Ralphs also supplied photos from the 1970s and 1980s for the booklet, taken from his personal archive. It would be the last Bad Company release to feature original bassist Boz Burrell, who died from a heart attack on 21 September 2006 in Spain.

Due to legal objections, Live in Albuquerque 1976 was withdrawn shortly after its release.

== Track listing ==
=== Disc one ===
1. Live for the Music (Mick Ralphs) – 4:47
2. Good Lovin' Gone Bad (Ralphs) – 4:04
3. Deal with the Preacher (Ralphs, Paul Rodgers) – 4:59
4. Ready for Love (Ralphs; Mott the Hoople cover) – 6:55
5. Wild Fire Woman (Ralphs, Rodgers) – 6:15
6. Young Blood (Doc Pomus cover) – 2:47
7. Sweet Lil' Sister (Ralphs) – 4:11
8. Simple Man (Ralphs) – 4:37
9. Shooting Star (Rodgers) – 6:22
10. Seagull (Ralphs, Rodgers) – 4:07

=== Disc two ===
1. Run with the Pack (Rodgers) – 6:22
2. Feel Like Makin' Love (Ralphs, Rodgers) – 5:46
3. Rock Steady (Rodgers) – 4:43
4. Honey Child (Boz Burrell, Simon Kirke, Ralphs, Rodgers) – 4:44
5. Can't Get Enough (Ralphs) – 7:47
6. Bad Company (Kirke, Rodgers) – 8:33

== Personnel ==
Bad Company

- Paul Rodgers – vocals, piano, guitar, harmonica
- Mick Ralphs – lead guitar, background vocals, producer
- Boz Burrell – bass
- Simon Kirke – drums
