= Inside Bad Company 1974–1982 =

Video by Bad Company
- Released: 31 May 2005
- Genre: Hard rock
- Length: 185:00
- Label: Classic Rock Legends

Bad Company chronology
Merchants of Cool (2002)	Inside Bad Company 1974–1982 (2005)	Live in Albuquerque 1976 (2006)

Inside Bad Company 1974–1982 is a documentary about the English hard rock band Bad Company released in 2005. The DVD reviews Bad Company on stage, on film and on record, with film never previously available. Founding member Simon Kirke and biographer Steven Rosen revisit on the life and work of the classic era of Bad Company. The DVD covers the band in the 1970s, 1980s of the original line-up of Paul Rodgers, Mick Ralphs, Boz Burrell and Simon Kirke. Featured are some of the band's biggest hits, including "Can't Get Enough", "Feel Like Makin' Love" and of course, "Bad Company", but no complete performances of any songs are shown, only clips of them. The documentary has interview segments with Kirke, (the only member to be with the band for its entire history) and has instrumental demonstrations showing how the songs were written and played.

Professional ratings
Review scores
Source	Rating
AllMusic	2.5/5 stars

== Details ==
- Release Date: 31 May 2005
- Label: Classic Rock Legends
- Running Time: 1 hour, 58 minutes
- Screen Format: Full Screen 4:3
- Format: Closed-captioned, Colour
- Format: DVD
- Recording Mode: Stereo
- Recording Type: Studio
- Full title: Inside Bad Company 1974–1982: The Definitive Critical Review with Simon Kirke
