= Ready for Love (Mott the Hoople song) =

1972 Mott the Hoople song also performed by Bad Company

"Ready for Love"/"After Lights"

Song by Mott the Hoople

from the album All the Young Dudes
- Released: 1972
- Recorded: 1972
- Genre: Hard rock
- Length: 6:47
- Label: CBS (UK), Columbia (US)
- Songwriter: Mick Ralphs
- Producer: David Bowie

"Ready for Love" is a song written by Mick Ralphs that was first released by his band Mott the Hoople on their 1972 album All the Young Dudes. After Ralphs left Mott the Hoople to join Bad Company, a revamped version of the song was released on his new band's 1974 debut album, Bad Company. Although not released as a single, the Bad Company version became a popular radio song; it has appeared on many of Bad Company's live and compilation albums.

== Mott the Hoople version ==
Mott the Hoople recorded "Ready for Love" on their 1972 album All the Young Dudes. On the album, "Ready for Love" segues into another Ralphs' composition, the instrumental "After Lights". Allmusic critic Dave Thompson described "After Lights" as "a virtuoso afterglow, and...one of Ralphs' most tasteful displays ever."

Ralphs sang the lead vocal on the Mott the Hoople version of the song, but he was unhappy with it and had wanted Ian Hunter to sing the lead vocal, but the song was outside of Hunter's range. Ralphs desire for a stronger lead singer to perform this song helped lead to the formation of Bad Company, as he felt Paul Rodgers' would be able to perform the song to his liking. Thompson feels that Ralphs' vocal performance ironically makes the Mott the Hoople version preferable to the Bad Company version, stating that "the fact that the vocals are so uncertain adds a weight to the lyric which Rodgers' self-assured bellow was just a little too blasé to capture."

In his contemporary review of All the Young Dudes, Rolling Stone critic Bud Scoppa regarded "Ready for Love" as being "the best [Ralphs has] ever done." Allmusic critic Stephen Thomas Erlewine referred to "Ready for Love"/"After Lights" as a "highlight" of All the Young Dudes. The Dispatch critic Dink Lorance called "Ready for Love"/"After Lights" his favorite track on the album. Los Angeles Times critic Richard Cromelin described "Ready to Love" as "a sledgehammer rocker that tends to grow on you." Pitchfork critic Joe Tangari said that Mott the Hoople's version "pales in comparison" to the Bad Company version.

A live version of "Ready for Love"/"After Lights" was included on Mott the Hoople's 2000 live album Greatest Hits Live. Newsday critic Gil de Rubio called this version "poignant."

== Bad Company version ==
"Ready for Love"

Song by Bad Company

from the album Bad Company
- Released: 1974
- Recorded: November 1973
- Genre: Hard rock
- Length: 5:03
- Label: Swan Song
- Songwriter: Mick Ralphs
- Producer: Bad Company

Rolling Stone critic Bud Scoppa said that Bad Company's version of "Ready for Love" "has the measured, somber gait of a Free song in the verses, with explosions of accumulated tension in the choruses. In 1975 (after Bad Company's second album Straight Shooter had been released), music critic Dave Marsh considered "Ready for Love" to be Bad Company's best song. Allmusic critic Stephen Thomas Erlewine referred to it as a "quintessential classic rock staple."

Ultimate Classic Rock critic Matt Wardlaw rated it as Bad Company's 6th best song, saying that the Bad Company version is a touch more moody than the original, which has an extra bit of swagger." Wardlaw also praised Paul Rodgers' lead vocals, saying that they "walk with the shackles of a man who has been denied what he wants for way too long." Classic Rock critic Malcolm Dome rated it as Bad Company's 7th best song, saying that it "has the atmosphere of someone trying to convince his lover that things are changing for the better" and also praised the song's "simplicity and acuity."

"Ready for Love" later appeared on several of Bad Company's compilation albums, including 10 from 6 in 1985, The Original Bad Company Anthology in 1999 and Rock 'n' Roll Fantasy: The Very Best of Bad Company in 2015. It also appeared on live albums such as What You Hear Is What You Get: The Best of Bad Company in 1993, In Concert: Merchants of Cool in 2002, Live in Albuquerque 1976, released in 2006, Hard Rock Live in 2010, Live at Wembley in 2010 and Live in Concert 1977 & 1979, released in 2016.

Bad Company re-recorded the song for their 1996 album Stories Told & Untold with Robert Hart singing lead vocals in place of Rodgers.

=== Personnel ===
- Paul Rodgers – vocals
- Mick Ralphs – guitar, keyboards
- Boz Burrell – bass
- Simon Kirke – drums
