= Hard Rock Live (in Seminole Hard Rock Hollywood) =

Multi-purpose arena in Hollywood, Florida, U.S.

Hard Rock Live Hollywood, FL
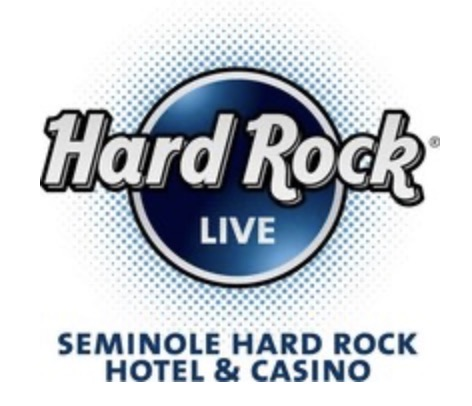

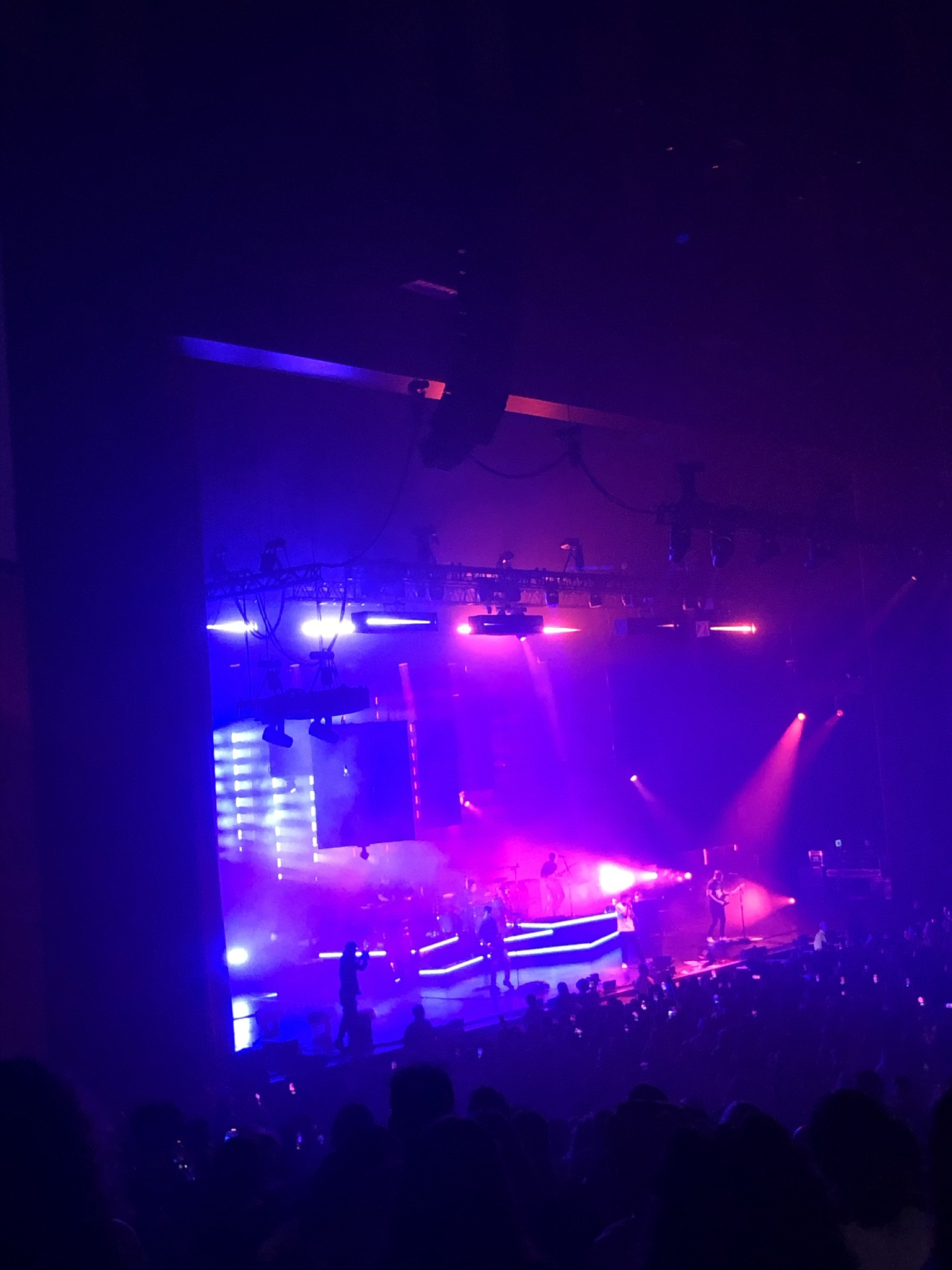
- Interior view with Louis Tomlinson on his Faith in the Future World Tour in July 2023
- Full name: Hard Rock Live at the Seminole Hard Rock Hotel & Casino
- Address: 5747 Seminole Way, 33314
- Location: Seminole Hard Rock Hotel & Casino, Hollywood, Florida, U.S.
- Coordinates: 26.0534746°N 80.2110965°W
- Owner: Seminole Gaming
- Operator: Seminole Hard Rock Entertainment
- Capacity: 7,000 (2019–present); 5,500 (2005–2018)

Construction
- Groundbreaking: March 2018
- Opened: July 12, 2005; 21 years ago
- Renovated: March 2018 – October 24, 2019
- Expanded: March 31, 2017 – October 24, 2019
- Closed: March 2018; 8 years ago
- Reopened: October 25, 2019; 6 years ago
- Demolished: March 2018 (original)
- Architects: Scéno Plus (2019–present); Morris Architects (2005–2018)
- General contractors: Suffolk-Yates (2019–present); Tutor Perini Building Corp. (2005–2018)

Tenants
- Florida Frenzy (NIFL) (2006-08); Lingerie Bowl VII (LFL) (2010)

Website
- Official website
- Building details
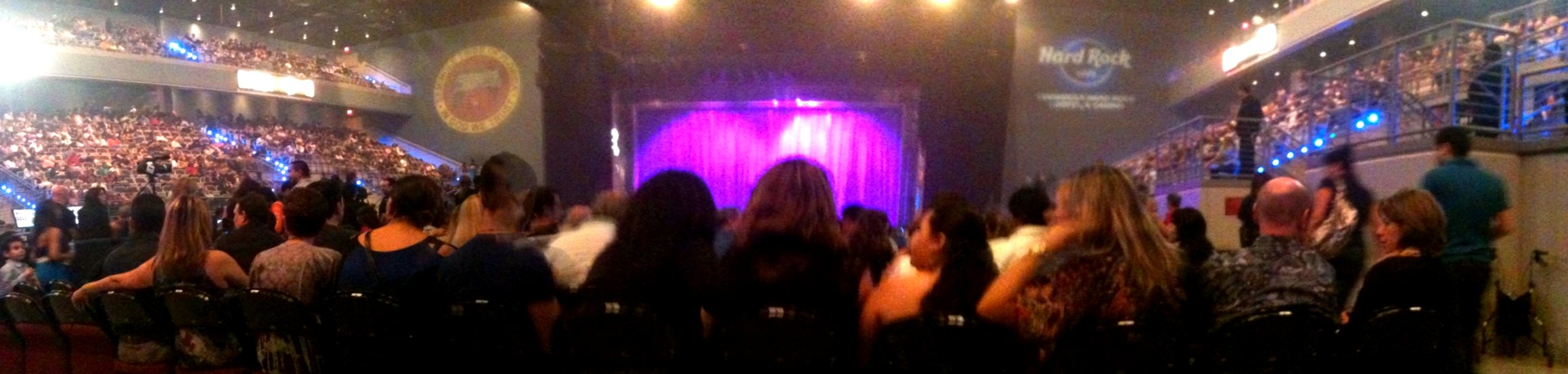
- Panorama of the original 5,500-seat arena having Mariah Carey concert (December 2010)

Design and construction
- Developer: Power Plant Entertainment, LLC

Renovating team
- Renovating firm: Hard Rock International

Hard Rock Live is an indoor theater at the Seminole Hard Rock Hotel & Casino in Hollywood, Florida, (Note: City location is often listed as Davie, FL, due to a shared postal code.) United States, a suburb of Fort Lauderdale. The venue opened in July 2005 as a multi-purpose arena, developed by the Baltimore, Maryland-based Cordish Companies as part of Seminole Paradise.

In March 2018, it went through redevelopment, including an upgrade to a 7,000-seat capacity. The new theater opened on October 25, 2019, as part of a $1.5 billion property-wide expansion, which also included a new 450-foot (140 m) guitar-shaped hotel tower, an expanded casino, new dining and retail options, and new amenities, including The Shoppes at The Guitar Hotel, which replaces Seminole Paradise.

== History ==
=== 2002–2005: Development and opening ===
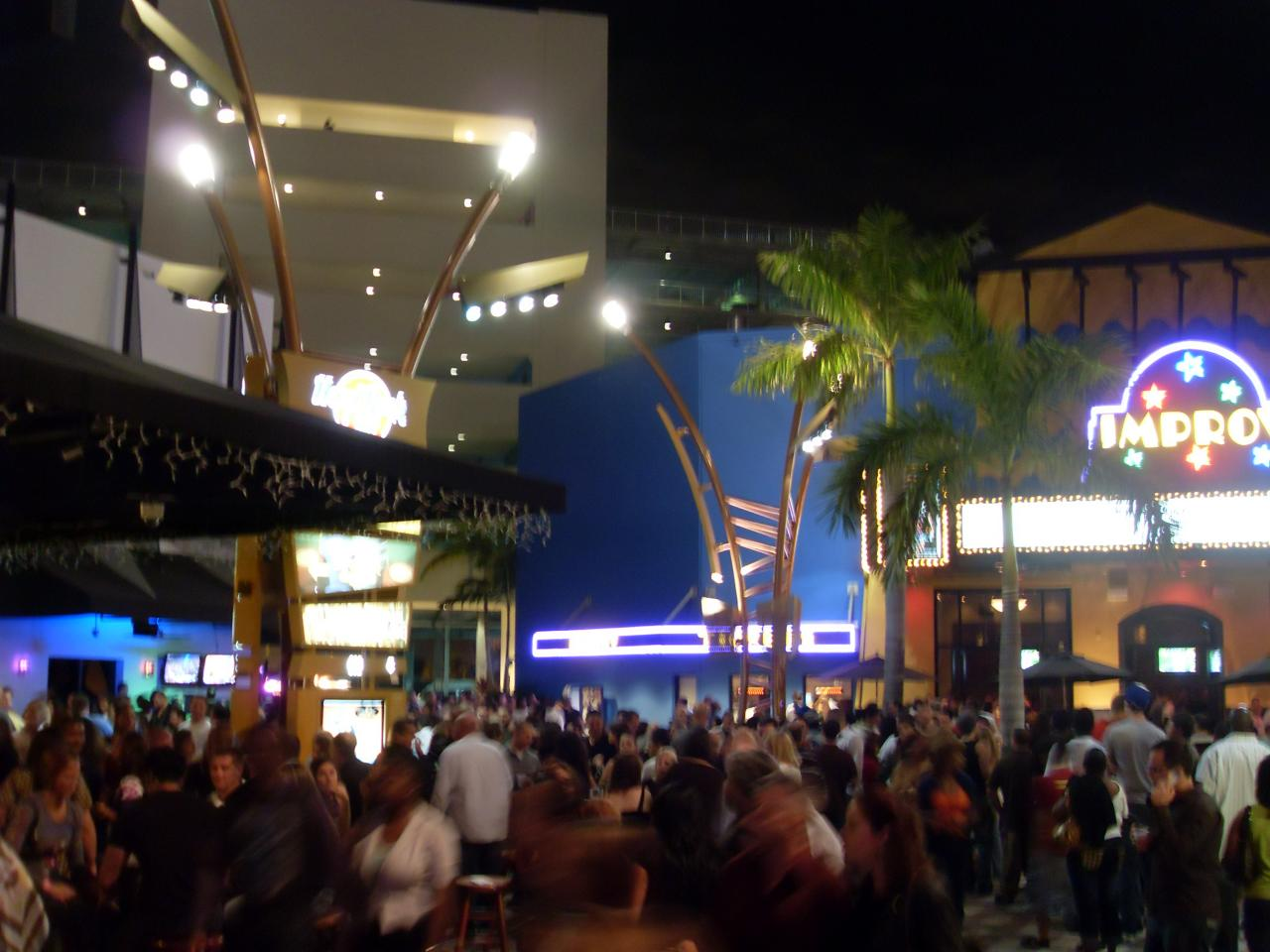
Paradise Shops at night with the Improv Comedy Club on the right (November 2008)

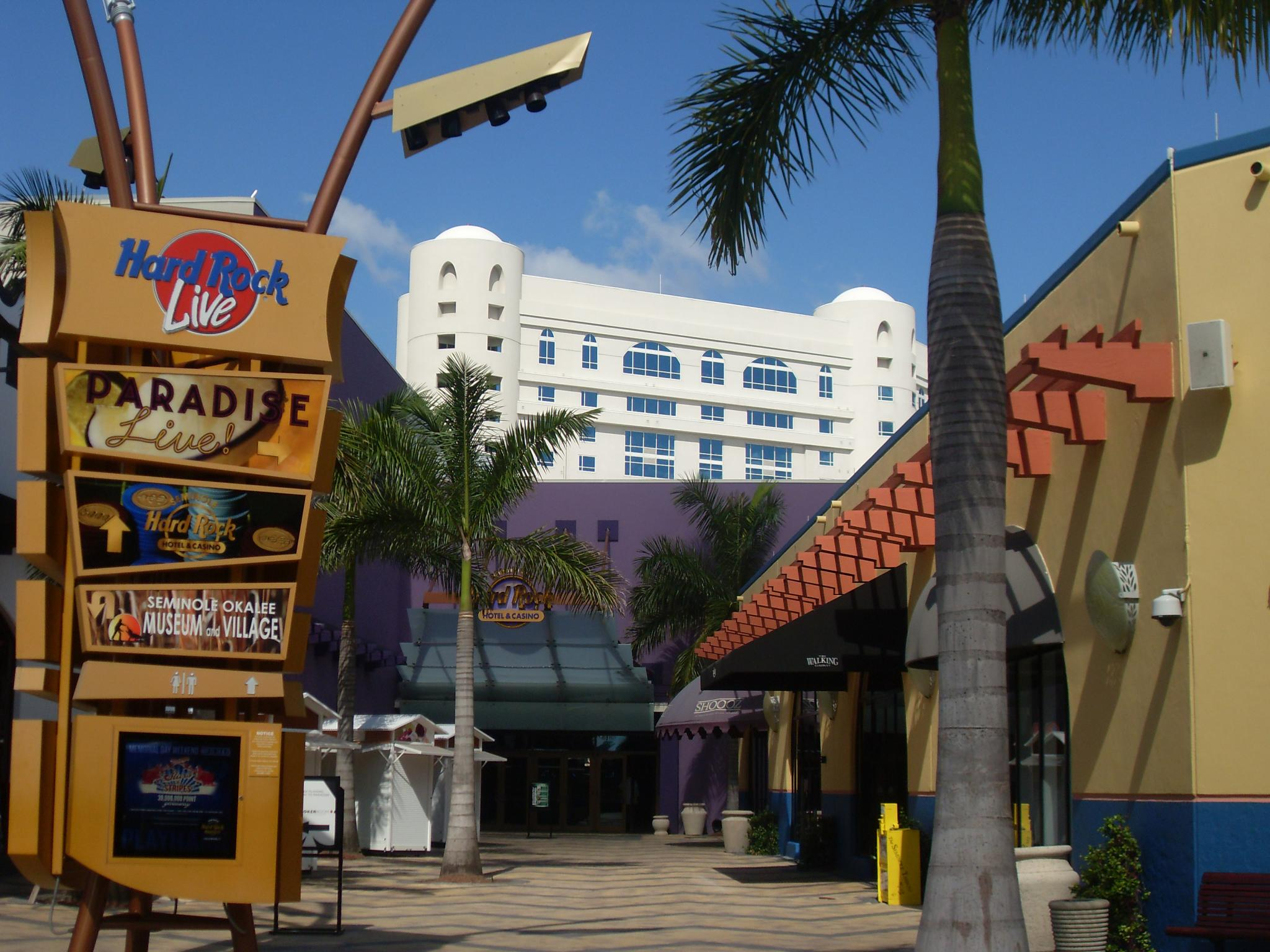
Main entrance to Seminole Paradise (May 2009)

The Cordish Companies of Baltimore, Maryland, operating as Power Plant Entertainment, LLC alongside Coastal Development, unveiled their final plans for the Seminole Hard Rock Hotel & Casino on May 3, 2002, with the proposal including a 1,000-seat theater that would be branded as Hard Rock Live, inspired after the success of Power Plant Live! (hence the name of the affiliate) and Hard Rock Live Orlando at Universal CityWalk. Financing was supported via the sale of $315 million worth of Capital Trust Agency Revenue bonds by the Seminole Tribe of Florida.

While the main resort had its grand opening on May 11, 2004, (Note: Some sources might list "May 1, 2004" instead of "May 11, 2004", but official sources—such as Tampa Bay Times and Sun Sentinel—list May 11.) plans for Hard Rock Live were altered to serve as Phase II of the project. A shopping mall and entertainment district known as Seminole Paradise, also referred to as Paradise Shops, with 350,000 square feet (33,000 m^{2}) would house the arena as a tenant and had its grand opening on January 14, 2005 with former Miami Dolphins quarterback Dan Marino being present. The Improv Comedy Club, Cuban Café, Tequila Ranch, Martorano's, and the 400-seat Paradise Live! venue were all tenants at the mall by February 23, 2005. The complex featured 24 retail shops centered around a 12-acre (4.9 ha) man-made lake, 17 restaurants, including national chains Johnny Rockets and Hooters, and 13 nightclubs.

Hard Rock Live itself would follow on July 12, 2005, initially developed by Cordish as a 5,500-seat multi-purpose theater, which hosted music and comedy shows, sporting events including world championship boxing, mixed martial arts, tennis, basketball and rodeo events, and corporate meetings, celebrity charity fundraisers and exhibitions, notable for the appearance of Def Leppard. The arena and Seminole Paradise were designed by Morris Architects, which also designed the Orlando location in 1999.

=== 2005–present ===
The arena has hosted numerous music acts, including The Rolling Stones, Shakira, Eric Clapton, Aerosmith, Janet Jackson, B.B. King, Willie Nelson, Staind, Slipknot, Bon Jovi, The Who, The Killers, Patti LaBelle, Bruce Springsteen, Billy Joel, Gloria Estefan, Rod Stewart, Def Leppard, Ringo Starr, Prince, Chimaira, Fear Factory, Paul McCartney, Andrea Bocelli, Tim McGraw, Fergie, Guns N' Roses, Post Malone, and Ed Sheeran. The 2008 concert of classic rock band Bad Company at the venue was recorded for a 2010 release on CD and DVD. The arena was also home to the Florida Frenzy indoor football team.

In March 2, 2007, following a bitter lawsuit between Cordish and the Seminoles that was settled that day, their $965 million acquisition of Hard Rock International from the Rank Group was completed, giving the tribe full operational control of the arena and the mall. As part of a $1.5 billion property-wide expansion, which included the Guitar Hotel, all tenants of Seminole Paradise had to be evicted by March 31, 2017; the mall closed permanently that day and demolition immediately followed. Hard Rock Live hosted its final event on February 24, 2018, with Jerry Seinfeld being the final performer, before also being razed in March 2018 to be replaced by the new, larger 7,000-seat theater, which opened on October 25, 2019, with a concert by Maroon 5. It was designed by the Canadian firm Scéno Plus alongside Suffolk-Yates. During the theater's construction, events were held in the temporary 3,500-seat Hard Rock Event Center, which opened in March 2018 and hosted acts including Britney Spears on her Piece of Me Tour. The theater hosted the Miss Universe 2020 coronation night on May 16, 2021.

== See also ==
- The Fishmarket
- Fourth Street Live!
- The Forum Shops at Caesars
- Westfield World Trade Center
- Bayside Marketplace
