= Nightfly (band) =

British rock band

- Also known as: Heyday
- Genres: Rock music
- Years active: 1984–1985
- Past members: Spencer James; Mickey Simmonds; Micky Moody; Zak Starkey; Boz Burrell
- Website: Website

Nightfly was a short-lived British rock band formed in late 1984. Most of its members had enjoyed success with earlier bands.

Originally known as Heyday, the band was managed by Bob Young and Colin Johnson. Nightfly played some clubs in February 1985, including a performance at the Marquee Club, and recorded demos produced by John Entwistle.

== Members ==
- Spencer James - vocals, previously with The First Class
- Mickey Simmonds - keyboards, previously with John Coghlan's Diesel
- Micky Moody - guitar, previously with Whitesnake
- Zak Starkey - drums, son of Ringo Starr, later with The Who.
- Boz Burrell - bass, previously with Bad Company
