= Shooting Star (Bad Company song) =

1975 song by Bad Company

Song by Bad Company

from the album Straight Shooter
- Released: 28 March 1975
- Recorded: September 1974
- Studio: Clearwell Castle, Gloucestershire, England
- Genre: Blues rock
- Length: 6:16
- Label: Island (UK); Swan Song (US)
- Songwriter: Paul Rodgers
- Producer: Bad Company

"Shooting Star" is a song written by Paul Rodgers that was first released by Bad Company on their 1975 album Straight Shooter. Although not released as a single, it became a radio staple and has appeared on many of Bad Company's live and compilation albums.

== Lyrics and music ==
The lyrics of "Shooting Star" tell the story of a boy named Johnny who first heard his first Beatles song, "Love Me Do”, and went on to become a rock star, but died after overdosing on whiskey and sleeping pills. The theme was influenced by the deaths of young rock stars as a result of drug addiction, particularly the deaths from overdoses of Jim Morrison, Janis Joplin and possibly Jimi Hendrix. Rodgers stated that "At that particular time you had Jimi Hendrix, Janis Joplin...just a catalog of people who didn't make it, who overdosed in their beds...that was the germ of this song." It's a story and it's almost a warning. The refrain summarizes the theme stating "Don't you know that you are a shooting star, and all the world will love you just as long as you are a shooting star." In a contemporary review, Messenger-Press critic Steve Wosahla suggested that this line is "typical of how we treat our stars today."

In 1997, Bad Company drummer Simon Kirke said of the song that:

It's a generic example of what has happened and what can happen and, I'm afraid, will happen to people who come into this business and meddle with drink and drugs. When we were younger, we all dabbled – none of us are saints. I'm not saying we didn't have fun, but I just don't do that anymore...It has a good message for me because I'm in a 12-step program and I try and adhere to it on a daily basis. It's one of those songs that just reminds me to do it.

The song employs what Allmusic critic Stephen Thomas Erlewine describes as an "expanded aural vocabulary" compared to the songs on Bad Company's debut album. Rolling Stone Album Guide critics Mark Coleman and Mark Kemp described the song as a "half-acoustic lust ballad."

== Reception ==
Rolling Stone critic Ed Naha called "Shooting Star" the "pièce de résistance" of Straight Shooter and "the highpoint of [Paul Rodgers'] writing career." Naha states that "Rodgers nearly assumes the role of the Harry Chapin of crotch rock as he casually recounts the chilling tale of a young rock star … from beginning to end" and that the "calculated effect of the song is made stronger by its low-keyed approach to melodrama." Wosahla it was the Bad Company's "biggest achievement" on Straight Shooter, as well as "proof of the growing talent of Rodgers'capabilities of expressing his talent into words." Los Angeles Times critic Robert Hilburn praised the chorus and Rodgers' lead vocal, but criticized "corny" lyrics such as "John's life passed him by on a warm sunny day/But if you listen to the wind/You can still hear him play." Stephen Thomas Erlewine described it as one of the two "big hits" from Straight Shooter (along with "Feel Like Makin' Love") and a "classic rock staple". Greenville News critic Donna Isbell Walker agreed that it is a "radio staple".

Ultimate Classic Rock critic Matt Wardlaw rated it as Bad Company's 3rd best song, saying that it "acts as a cautionary tale about what can happen when a big dreamer gets more success than he can handle." Classic Rock critic Malcolm Dome rated it as Bad Company's 4th best song, calling it "an epic tale of the rise and fall of a rock star." Classic Rock History critic Janey Roberts rated it as Bad Company's 5th best song.

== Legacy ==
"Shooting Star" later appeared on several of Bad Company's compilation albums, including 10 from 6 in 1985, The Original Bad Company Anthology in 1999 and Rock 'n' Roll Fantasy: The Very Best of Bad Company in 2015. It also appeared on live albums such as What You Hear Is What You Get: The Best of Bad Company in 1993, In Concert: Merchants of Cool in 2002, Live in Albuquerque 1976, released in 2006, Hard Rock Live in 2010, Live at Wembley in 2010 and Live in Concert 1977 & 1979, released in 2016.

Bad Company re-recorded the song for their 1996 album Stories Told & Untold with Robert Hart singing lead vocals in place of Rodgers and Bon Jovi guitarist Richie Sambora playing guitar.

"Shooting Star" was included in the game Rock Band 2. The song was also featured in the soundtrack to the 1994 film Clerks.

In 2009 Rodgers discussed the song saying:

I think "Shooting Star" has a lot of poignancy for me. It's strange how some songs can sort of come to you and write themselves, and "Shooting Star" and Elvis Presley are things I've been thinking about lately. For some reason, every time I turn around I'm finding Elvis Presley. It's so strange. Back in the '70s, I was sent a message by Elvis through his manager, and he sent me his autograph, and a message, and you know how people say "Keep rockin'" or whatever. Well, he said, "Take time to live." And I thought, "What does that mean?" and he died soon afterward. He was very much a shooting star, you know.

In 1999 Rodgers felt that the theme of "Shooting Star" about being a "rock burnout" remained relevant and also said that "To a large extent, everybody has their moments as a shooting star. Whether you sell a trillion records or not, you have to be true to yourself."
