= Extended Versions (Ted Nugent album) =

Compilation album by Ted Nugent
- Released: September 27, 2005
- Genre: Hard rock
- Length: 52:16
- Label: Sony BMG

Ted Nugent chronology
Decades of Destruction (2004)	Extended Versions (2005)	Love Grenade (2007)

Professional ratings
Review scores
Source	Rating
AllMusic	3.5/5 stars

Ted Nugent: Extended Versions is a compilation album by the American hard rock guitarist Ted Nugent, featuring songs extracted from his live albums.

== Track listing ==
All songs written by Ted Nugent except where noted.

1. "Stormtroopin'" - 5:52
2. "Just What the Doctor Ordered" - 5:17
3. "Dog Eat Dog" - 5:18
4. "Yank Me, Crank Me" - 4:21
5. "Stranglehold" - 10:27
6. "Cat Scratch Fever" - 3:49
7. "Put Up or Shut Up" - 3:23
8. "Land of a Thousand Dances" (Fats Domino, Chris Kenner) - 4:31
9. "I Take No Prisoners" - 3:28
10. "Baby, Please Don't Go" (Big Joe Williams) - 5:50
- Tracks 1, 2, 4, 5, & 10 taken from Double Live Gonzo!
- Tracks 7, 8, & 9 taken from Intensities in 10 Cities
- Track 3 taken from Free-for-All reissue; Recorded live at Hammersmith Odeon, London, 1977
- Tracks 1, 2, 3, 4, 5 & 10 with Rob Grange
