= This Love (Bad Company song) =

Single by Bad Company

from the album Fame and Fortune
- B-side: "Tell It Like It Is"
- Released: October 1986
- Genre: Pop rock
- Length: 4:21 (album version); 3:44 (radio edit)
- Label: Atlantic
- Songwriter(s): Brian Howe, Christopher Fretwell
- Producer(s): Keith Olsen

Bad Company singles chronology
"Electricland" (1982)	"This Love" (1986)	"That Girl" (1986)

"This Love" is a song by English rock band Bad Company. The song was released as the lead single from the band's seventh studio album Fame and Fortune, the group's first single since reforming earlier that year with ex-Ted Nugent vocalist Brian Howe.

== Music video ==
A music video was created for the song, showing the band performing the song on a stage.

== Track listing ==
7" single

Side A
No.	Title	Length
1.	"This Love" (radio edit)	3:44

Side B
No.	Title	Length
1.	"Tell It Like It Is"	3:42

12" single

Side A
No.	Title	Length
1.	"This Love" (radio edit)	3:44

Side B
No.	Title	Length
1.	"This Love" (LP version)	4:21

== Charts ==
Chart (1986)	Peak position
New Zealand	12
Billboard Hot 100	85
Billboard Mainstream Rock Songs	12

== Personnel ==
- Brian Howe – lead vocals, saxophone
- Mick Ralphs – guitar, keyboard, backing vocals
- Steve Price – bass
- Simon Kirke – drums
