= Gone, Gone, Gone (Bad Company song) =

- Cover for the Japanese single

Single by Bad Company

from the album Desolation Angels
- B-side: "Take the Time"
- Released: July 1979 (US)
- Recorded: August – September 1978
- Studio: Ridge Farm Studios, Surrey, England
- Genre: Hard rock
- Length: 3:50
- Label: Swan Song
- Songwriter(s): Boz Burrell
- Producer(s): Bad Company

Bad Company singles chronology
"Rock 'n' Roll Fantasy" (1979)	"Gone, Gone, Gone" (1979)	"Electricland" (1982)

"Gone, Gone, Gone" is a song by English rock band Bad Company. The song was released as the second and final single from the band's fifth studio album Desolation Angels. The song peaked at #56 on the Billboard Hot 100 on August 25, 1979.

"Gone, Gone, Gone" was written by bassist Boz Burrell, his first individual composition for the band.

== Reception ==
Billboard said "Gone, Gone, Gone" was "a solid rocking number paced by strong guitar work." Cash Box described it as "guitar-based blues-rock" with a "crunching bass line" and Paul Rodgers' "smokey rock delivery." Record World said that the "tribal beat, Rodgers' classic rock vocals and stinging guitars make an unbeatable AOR-Top 40 brew." Allmusic reviewer Mike DeGagne said that the song worked well for lead singer Rodgers. Democrat and Chronicle critic Jack Garner described it as being "jazzy" and new direction for the band, highlighting its "interesting minor harmonies." Classic Rock History critic Janey Roberts rated it as Bad Company's 10th best song, calling it a "heartbreaking, but oh-so-rocking Bad Company tune."

Morning Call critic Alan Jaresch said that the song "really isn't a bad song for getting down and playing rock 'n' roll animal. Jaresch highlighted the lyrics "My baby just walked out the door, she said this time's forever / It ain't the first time baby / Baby, it won't be the last / I better get the boys 'round and do some drinking fast" as being perfect for when you want to drown your misery in heavy partying after your girlfriend says she's leaving you.

Live versions of "Gone, Gone, Gone" were released on Hard Rock Live, Live at Wembley and Live in Concert 1977 & 1979.

== Track listing ==
7" single

Side A
No.	Title	Writer(s)	Length
1.	"Gone, Gone, Gone"	Boz Burrell	3:50

Side B
No.	Title	Writer(s)	Length
1.	"Take the Time"	Mick Ralphs	4:14

Promo single

No.	Title	Length
1.	"Gone, Gone, Gone" (Mono)	3:45

No.	Title	Length
1.	"Gone, Gone, Gone" (Stereo)	3:45

== Charts ==
Chart (1979)	Peak position
RPM Canadian Singles Chart	55
Billboard Hot 100	56

== Personnel ==
- Paul Rodgers – vocals, guitar
- Mick Ralphs – guitar
- Boz Burrell – bass
- Simon Kirke – drums
