= Extended Versions =

Extended Versions is a series of discounted live albums published by BMG Special Products starting in the late 1990s. To date, there have been over 100 albums released in this series.

== List of Extended Versions albums ==
- Extended Versions (10,000 Maniacs album), 2009
- Extended Versions (38 Special album), 2000
- Extended Versions (Asia album), 2007
- Extended Versions (Bad Company album), 2010
- Extended Versions (Barenaked Ladies album), 2006
- Extended Versions (Big Star album), 2004
- Extended Versions (Cinderella album), 2006
- Extended Versions (Deep Purple album), 2000
- Extended Versions (Emerson, Lake & Palmer album), 2000
- Extended Versions (Europe album), 2007
- Extended Versions (Everclear album), 2011
- Extended Versions (The Fixx album), 2000
- Extended Versions (Foghat album), 2001
- Extended Versions (Foreigner album), 2005
- Extended Versions (Great White album), 2004
- Extended Versions (Humble Pie album), 2000
- Extended Versions (Jethro Tull album), 2006
- Extended Versions (Little Feat album), 2000
- Extended Versions (Lou Reed album), 2003
- Extended Versions (Loverboy album), 2009
- Extended Versions (Lynyrd Skynyrd album), 1998
- Extended Versions (Benny Mardones album), 2006
- Extended Versions (Megadeth album), 2007
- Extended Versions (The Monkees album), 2003
- Extended Versions (Motörhead album), 2002
- Extended Versions (Ted Nugent album), 2005
- Extended Versions (The Outlaws album), 2002
- Extended Versions (Overkill album), 2002
- Extended Versions (Queensrÿche album), 2007
- Extended Versions (REO Speedwagon album), 2001
- Extended Versions (Ringo Starr album), 2003
- Extended Versions (Soul Asylum album), 2010
- Extended Versions (Stryper album), 2003
- Extended Versions (Styx album), 2000
- Extended Versions (Todd Rundgren album), 2001
- Extended Versions (Triumph album), 2006
- Extended Versions (Yes album), 2002
