= Rough Diamonds (album) =

1982 album by Bad Company

Studio album by Bad Company
- Released: 12 August 1982 (US); 20 August 1982 (UK)
- Recorded: March – April 1981
- Studios: Ridge Farm Studios, Surrey, England
- Genres: Hard rock; blues rock
- Length: 38:00
- Label: Swan Song
- Producer: Bad Company

Bad Company chronology
Desolation Angels (1979)	Rough Diamonds (1982)	10 from 6 (1985)

Singles from Rough Diamonds
- 1. "Electricland" Released: September 1982

Professional ratings
Review scores
Source	Rating
AllMusic	2/5 stars
Rolling Stone	2/5 stars

Rough Diamonds is the sixth studio album by the English rock band Bad Company. The album was released in August 1982. Rough Diamonds, like its predecessor, Desolation Angels, was recorded at Ridge Farm Studio in Surrey, England, in March and April 1981 and engineered by Max Norman (famed for his work with Ozzy Osbourne).

It was the last album to feature the original lineup. The sessions were rough going from the beginning. First, their manager, Peter Grant, withdrew from view after the death of Led Zeppelin drummer John Bonham in 1980. Then, on another occasion, a fistfight broke out between Paul Rodgers and Boz Burrell, and the two bandmates were restrained by Mick Ralphs and Simon Kirke. Following the album, they disbanded, with Rodgers going on to release his first solo album, Cut Loose, the following year.

The album's opening track, "Electricland", written by Rodgers, was the album's biggest hit. "Painted Face" and "Racetrack" also received substantial airplay on rock stations. The album became the original line-up's worst-selling album, reaching a disappointing No. 26 on the Billboard album charts in 1982. The album was remastered and re-released in 1994. To date, this is the only album of the classic six Bad Company records to not get a 2CD Deluxe Edition release.

== Track listing ==
Side one
No.	Title	Writer(s)	Length
1.	"Electricland"	Paul Rodgers	5:29
2.	"Untie the Knot"	Rodgers; Simon Kirke	4:07
3.	"Nuthin' on the TV"	Boz Burrell	3:46
4.	"Painted Face"	Rodgers	3:24
5.	"Kickdown"	Mick Ralphs	3:35

Side two
No.	Title	Writer(s)	Length
6.	"Ballad of the Band"	Burrell	2:10
7.	"Cross Country Boy"	Rodgers	3:00
8.	"Old Mexico"	Ralphs	3:49
9.	"Downhill Ryder"	Rodgers	4:09
10.	"Racetrack"	Rodgers	4:44

== Personnel ==
Bad Company

- Paul Rodgers – vocals; lead guitar on "Painted Face", "Cross Country Boy" and "Downhill Ryder"
- Mick Ralphs – guitars
- Boz Burrell – bass
- Simon Kirke – drums

with:

- John Cook – piano, synthesizer
- Mel Collins – saxophone

== Charts ==
Chart (1982)	Peak position
Australian Albums (Kent Music Report)	63
Canada Top Albums/CDs (RPM)	26
German Albums (Offizielle Top 100)	61
UK Albums (Official Charts)	15
US Billboard 200	26
