= Electricland =

Single by Bad Company

from the album Rough Diamonds
- B-side: "Untie the Knot"
- Released: September 1982
- Recorded: March – April 1981
- Studio: Ridge Farm Studios, Surrey, England
- Genre: Blues rock
- Length: 5:29 (album version); 4:24 (radio edit)
- Label: Swan Song
- Songwriter(s): Paul Rodgers
- Producer(s): Bad Company

Bad Company singles chronology
"Gone, Gone, Gone" (1979)	"Electricland" (1982)	"This Love" (1986)

"Electricland" is a song by English hard rock supergroup Bad Company. The song was released as the only single from the band's sixth studio album Rough Diamonds. It is the last single released by the band to feature their original line-up, as well as being the last to feature lead singer Paul Rodgers until 1999's "Hey Hey".

"Electricland" was a modest success, peaking at number 74 on the Billboard Hot 100. The song was a hit on American rock radio, peaking at number 2 on the then new Rock Albums & Top Tracks chart.

== Reception ==
In an otherwise negative review of the album, AllMusic reviewer William Ruhlmann picked "Electricland" as an AllMusic reviewer's pick. David Fricke of Rolling Stone praised Simon Kirke's drum performance, Paul Rodgers's vocals, and the song's dark mood.

=== Accolades ===
In 2016, Classic Rock Magazine ranked the song at number ten on their list of Bad Company's 10 best songs.

== Track listing ==
No.	Title	Length
1.	"Electricland" (radio edit)	4:24
2.	"Untie the Knot"	4:07

== Chart positions ==
Chart (1982)	Peak position
Billboard Hot 100	74
Billboard Mainstream Rock Songs	2

== Personnel ==
- Paul Rodgers – vocals, guitar, piano
- Mick Ralphs – guitar
- Boz Burrell – bass
- Simon Kirke – drums
