= Run with the Pack =

1976 studio album by Bad Company

Studio album by Bad Company
- Released: 30 January 1976
- Recorded: September 1975
- Studios: Grasse, France, with the Rolling Stones Mobile Studio
- Genres: Hard rock; blues rock
- Length: 36:14
- Label: Swan Song
- Producer: Bad Company

Bad Company chronology
Straight Shooter (1975)	Run with the Pack (1976)	Burnin' Sky (1977)

Singles from Run with the Pack
- 1. "Run with the Pack" Released: March 1976 (UK); 2. "Young Blood" Released: March 1976 (US); 3. "Honey Child" Released: July 1976 (US)

Professional ratings
Review scores
Source	Rating
AllMusic	2/5 stars
Christgau's Record Guide	B−
Rolling Stone	positive

Run with the Pack is the third studio album by English supergroup Bad Company. It was released on 30 January 1976, by Swan Song Records. The album was recorded in France using the Rolling Stones Mobile Truck in September 1975 with engineer Ron Nevison, and mixed in Los Angeles by Eddie Kramer. It was the only original Bad Company album without artwork from Hipgnosis, instead featuring artwork from Kosh.

== Background ==
The album peaked at No. 4 in the UK Albums Chart and No. 5 on the US Billboard 200. It has sold one million copies in the US alone.

The cover of the Coasters single "Young Blood" peaked at No. 20. The album also spawned rock radio classics "Silver, Blue & Gold", "Live for the Music", and the title track. "Silver, Blue & Gold" was never released as a single, but is one of the band's most popular compositions.

Cash Box said of "Do Right by Your Woman" that it "is an acoustic number, with some twelve-string work" and that "the harmonies are excellent, at times reminiscent of CSNY, and a low-down harmonical fill."

Classic Rock History critic Janey Roberts rated the title track as Bad Company's greatest song, saying that its energy "just simply defines what Bad Company was all about" and praising the "great intros" and "pulsating verses that built up to superman style choruses." Classic Rock critic Malcolm Dome rated it as Bad Company's sixth best song, praising its "panache and subtlety."

The album was remastered and re-released in 1994. The vinyl album had a shiny, silver cover, but CD versions feature a simple, light grey cover. The original album cover also came as a gatefold, with a photo of the band inside, sitting around a couch near a television tuned in to a Bugs Bunny cartoon. (It was revealed in the notes in the booklet accompanying the "Deluxe 2CD Edition", that originally the TV screen showed a still of I Love Lucy but it was not possible to get approval for its use on the album cover, so it was changed.)

== Track listing ==
Side one
No.	Title	Writer(s)	Length
1.	"Live for the Music"	Mick Ralphs	3:58
2.	"Simple Man"	Ralphs	3:37
3.	"Honey Child"	Paul Rodgers, Ralphs, Boz Burrell, Simon Kirke	3:15
4.	"Love Me Somebody"	Rodgers	3:09
5.	"Run with the Pack"	Rodgers	5:21

Side two
No.	Title	Writer(s)	Length
6.	"Silver, Blue & Gold"	Rodgers	5:03
7.	"Young Blood"	Jerry Leiber, Mike Stoller, Doc Pomus	2:37
8.	"Do Right by Your Woman"	Rodgers	2:51
9.	"Sweet Lil' Sister"	Ralphs	3:29
10.	"Fade Away"	Rodgers	2:54

2017 reissue disc two
No.	Title	Writer(s)	Length
1.	"Live for the Music" (Take 1 Alternate Vocal & Guitar)	Ralphs
2.	"Simple Man" (Take 3 Early Mix)	Ralphs
3.	"Honey Child" (Early Mix, Alternative Guitar Solo)	Rodgers, Ralphs, Kirke, Burrell
4.	"Run with the Pack" (Extended Version, Alternative Vocal)	Rodgers
5.	"Let There Be Love" (Take 1, Previously Unreleased)	Ralphs
6.	"Silver, Blue & Gold" (Take 1, Early Mix)	Rodgers
7.	"Young Blood" (Alternate Vocal)	Leiber, Stoller, Pomus
8.	"Do Right by Your Woman" (Alternative Vocal)	Rodgers
9.	"Sweet Lil' Sister" (Live/Studio Backing Track)	Ralphs
10.	"Fade Away" (Early Mix, Alternative Guitar Solo)	Rodgers
11.	"Do Right by Your Woman" (Acoustic Version)	Rodgers
12.	"(I Know) I'm Losing You" (Studio Jam)	Whitfield, Holland, Grant
13.	"Young Blood" (Alternative Version 2)	Leiber, Stoller, Pomus
14.	"Fade Away" (Island Studios demo)	Rodgers

== Personnel ==
Bad Company

- Paul Rodgers – lead vocals, guitar, piano
- Mick Ralphs – guitar, keyboards, backing vocals
- Boz Burrell – bass, backing vocals
- Simon Kirke – drums, backing vocals

Production

- Bad Company – production
- Ron Nevison – recording
- Eddie Kramer – mixing
- Kosh – cover art
- David Alexander – photography

== Charts ==
Chart (1976)	Peak position
Australian Albums (Kent Music Report)	9
Canada Top Albums/CDs (RPM)	13
Dutch Albums (Album Top 100)	11
New Zealand Albums (RMNZ)	32
Norwegian Albums (VG-lista)	11
Swedish Albums (Sverigetopplistan)	22
UK Albums (Official Charts)	4
US Billboard 200	5

== Certifications ==
Region	Certification	Certified units/sales
United Kingdom (BPI)	Gold	100,000^{^}
United States (RIAA)	Platinum	1,000,000^{^}
^{^} Shipments figures based on certification alone.
