= Burnin' Sky =

1977 studio album by Bad Company

Studio album by Bad Company
- Released: 3 March 1977
- Recorded: July–August 1976
- Studios: Château d'Hérouville, Hérouville, France
- Genres: Hard rock; blues rock
- Length: 44:48
- Label: Island
- Producer: Bad Company

Bad Company chronology
Run with the Pack (1976)	Burnin' Sky (1977)	Desolation Angels (1979)

Singles from Burnin' Sky
- 1. "Everything I Need" Released: February 1977; 2. "Burnin' Sky" Released: May 1977 (US)

Burnin' Sky is the fourth studio album by the English rock band Bad Company. It was released on 3 March 1977. Burnin' Sky was recorded in France at Château d'Hérouville in July and August 1976 with future Rolling Stones engineer Chris Kimsey. Its release was delayed until March 1977 so as not to compete with the band's then-current album Run with the Pack.

The song "Like Water" was originally recorded by lead singer Paul Rodgers' short-lived group Peace, which he formed while Free were on hiatus from 1971 to 1972. While the Peace recording was not released at the time, it did eventually see the light of day in the Free rarities box set Songs of Yesterday from 2000.

The album peaked at No. 15 on the Billboard 200 and No. 17 in the UK Albums Chart. The album was remastered and re-released in 1994. The cover is similar to the poster for the 1969 Sam Peckinpah film The Wild Bunch. In the 2000 movie Almost Famous, the fictitious band Stillwater's first T-shirt is strikingly similar to the Burnin' Sky album cover.

== Critical reception ==
Professional ratings
Review scores
Source	Rating
AllMusic	2.5/5 stars
Record Mirror	2/5 stars
The Rolling Stone Album Guide	2.5/5 stars

The New York Times noted the "subtler, quieter approach," writing that "the results sounded oddly somnolent."

== Track listing ==
All songs by Paul Rodgers unless otherwise noted.

Side one
No.	Title	Writer(s)	Length
1.	"Burnin' Sky"		5:09
2.	"Morning Sun"		4:07
3.	"Leaving You"		3:23
4.	"Like Water"	Rodgers, Machiko Shimizu	4:18
5.	"Knapsack"	Friedrich-Wilhelm Möller, Antonia Ridge	1:20
6.	"Everything I Need"	Rodgers, Mick Ralphs, Simon Kirke, Boz Burrell	3:22

Side two
No.	Title	Writer(s)	Length
7.	"Heartbeat"		2:36
8.	"Peace of Mind"	Kirke	3:22
9.	"Passing Time"		2:30
10.	"Too Bad"	Ralphs	3:47
11.	"Man Needs Woman"	Ralphs	3:43
12.	"Master of Ceremony"	Rodgers, Ralphs, Kirke, Burrell	7:10

2017 reissue disc two
No.	Title	Writer(s)	Length
1.	"Burnin' Sky" (Take 2, Alternate Vocal & Guitar)	Rodgers
2.	"Morning Sun" (Take 3 Early Version)	Rodgers
3.	"Leaving You" (Take 1, Alternative Vocal)	Rodgers
4.	"Like Water" (Take 1, Rough Mix)	Rodgers, Shimizu
5.	"Knapsack (The Happy Wanderer)" (Early Run Through)	Möller, Ridge
6.	"Everything I Need" (Take 2, Rough Mix)	Rodgers, Ralphs, Kirke, Burrell
7.	"Peace of Mind" (Alternate Version)	Kirke
8.	"Passing Time" (Alternative Vocal)	Rodgers
9.	"Too Bad" (Full Version)	Ralphs
10.	"Man Needs Woman" (Alternative Vocal & Guitar)	Ralphs
11.	"Too Bad" (Early Version, Mick Ralphs Vocal)	Ralphs
12.	"Man Needs Woman" (Take 2, Early Version, Mick Ralphs Vocal)	Ralphs
13.	"Burnin' Sky" (Take 1, Alternative Vocal)	Rodgers
14.	"Unfinished Story" (Previously Unreleased)	Rodgers

== Personnel ==
Bad Company

- Paul Rodgers – vocals, guitar, piano, accordion
- Mick Ralphs – guitar, keyboards
- Simon Kirke – drums
- Boz Burrell – bass

with:

- Mel Collins – saxophone, flute
- Tim Hinkley – keyboards

Technical

- Chris Kimsey – engineer

== Charts ==
Chart (1977)	Peak position
Australian Albums (Kent Music Report)	15
Canada Top Albums/CDs (RPM)	16
Dutch Albums (Album Top 100)	14
New Zealand Albums (RMNZ)	32
Swedish Albums (Sverigetopplistan)	32
UK Albums (Official Charts)	17
US Billboard 200	15

== Certifications ==
Region	Certification	Certified units/sales
United States (RIAA)	Gold	500,000^{^}
^{^} Shipments figures based on certification alone.
