= Desolation Angels (album) =

1979 studio album by Bad Company

Studio album by Bad Company
- Released: 7 March 1979
- Recorded: August – September 1978
- Studios: Ridge Farm Studio, Surrey, England
- Genres: Hard rock; blues rock
- Length: 41:03
- Label: Swan Song
- Producer: Bad Company

Bad Company chronology
Burnin' Sky (1977)	Desolation Angels (1979)	Rough Diamonds (1982)

Singles from Desolation Angels
- 1. "Rock 'n' Roll Fantasy" Released: March 1979; 2. "Gone, Gone, Gone" Released: July 1979 (US)

Professional ratings
Review scores
Source	Rating
AllMusic	3/5 stars
Christgau's Record Guide	C
Music Week	4/4 stars
The Rolling Stone Album Guide	3/5 stars

Desolation Angels is the fifth studio album by English rock supergroup Bad Company, released on 7 March 1979. Paul Rodgers revealed on In the Studio with Redbeard (which devoted an episode to Desolation Angels) that the album's title came from the 1965 novel of the same name by Jack Kerouac. The title was almost used 10 years prior to name the second album from Rodgers' previous band, Free, which in the end was called simply Free.

Desolation Angels was recorded at Ridge Farm Studios in Surrey, England in late 1978. It is considered the last strong album by Bad Company with the original lineup, mostly because it contains their last major hit, "Rock 'n' Roll Fantasy", written by Paul Rodgers and inspired by a guitar synthesizer riff which Rodgers had come up with. The album reached No. 3 on the U.S. Billboard album charts in 1979 and went platinum in 1979 and double platinum subsequently. It was their final top ten album in both the U.S. and the UK.

In addition to "Rock 'n' Roll Fantasy", "Gone, Gone, Gone", written by bassist Boz Burrell, also received substantial airplay on rock stations.

A cover version of "Oh, Atlanta", written by Mick Ralphs, was recorded by Alison Krauss and appears on her 1995 album Now That I've Found You: A Collection. The original version was used in the open to The Nashville Network's 1993 broadcast of the Motorcraft 500 when ABC (which originally had the broadcast) could not find time to air the race, which had been postponed six days by a snowstorm in the Atlanta Motor Speedway.

The album was remastered and re-released in 1994. In 2020, Rhino put out a deluxe edition to honor the 40th anniversary with many alternate versions and bonus tracks.

== Track listing ==
Side one
No.	Title	Writer(s)	Length
1.	"Rock 'n' Roll Fantasy"	Paul Rodgers	3:15
2.	"Crazy Circles"	Paul Rodgers	3:32
3.	"Gone, Gone, Gone"	Boz Burrell	3:50
4.	"Evil Wind"	Paul Rodgers	4:22
5.	"Early in the Morning"	Paul Rodgers	5:45

Side two
No.	Title	Writer(s)	Length
6.	"Lonely for Your Love"	Mick Ralphs	3:26
7.	"Oh, Atlanta"	Mick Ralphs	4:08
8.	"Take the Time"	Mick Ralphs	4:14
9.	"Rhythm Machine"	Simon Kirke, Boz Burrell	3:44
10.	"She Brings Me Love"	Paul Rodgers	4:42

=== 40th Anniversary Edition ===
Disc one - Remaster and Bonus Tracks
No.	Title	Length
11.	"Smokin’ 45" (Alternative Version 1)	3:36
12.	"Smokin’ 45" (Alternative Version 2)	3:13
13.	"Rock Fever" (Outtake)	3:03
14.	"Oh, Atlanta" (Slow Version with Fender Rhodes)	5:07
15.	"Rock ’n’ Roll Fantasy" (Alternative Version 1)	3:18
16.	"Rock ’n’ Roll Fantasy" (Alternative Version 2)	3:19
17.	"Rock ’n’ Roll Fantasy" (Alternative Version 3)	3:20
18.	"Crazy Circles" (Alternative Version)	3:33

Disc two - Bonus Tracks
No.	Title	Length
1.	"Gone, Gone, Gone" (Alternative Version)	4:08
2.	"Early In The Morning" (Alternative Version)	6:31
3.	"Lonely For Your Love" (Alternative Version 1)	4:07
4.	"Take The Time" (Alternative Version 1)	4:14
5.	"Evil Wind" (Alternative Version)	5:11
6.	"Take The Time" (Alternative Version 2)	4:15
7.	"Lonely For Your Love" (Alternative Version 2)	3:34
8.	"She Brings Me Love" (Alternate Version)	5:23
9.	"What Does It Matter" (Blues Jam)	2:07
10.	"Rhythm Machine" (Alternate Version)	3:45
11.	"Amen" (A cappella)	2:02

== Personnel ==
Bad Company

- Paul Rodgers – vocals, guitar, piano, synthesisers
- Mick Ralphs – guitar, keyboards
- Boz Burrell – bass
- Simon Kirke – drums

Additional personnel

- The Bones – backing vocals (10)

Production

- Bad Company – producer
- Tony Patrick – recording engineer
- Hipgnosis – sleeve design, photography
- Christel Johansson – photo model
- Peter Christopherson – photo model

== Charts ==
Chart (1979)	Peak position
Australian Albums (Kent Music Report)	27
Canada Top Albums/CDs (RPM)	6
Dutch Albums (Album Top 100)	27
UK Albums (Official Charts)	10
US Billboard 200	3

== Certifications ==
Region	Certification	Certified units/sales
Australia (ARIA)	Gold	20,000^{^}
United States (RIAA)	2× Platinum	2,000,000^{^}
^{^} Shipments figures based on certification alone.
