= Honey Child =

Single by Bad Company

from the album Run with the Pack
- B-side: "Fade Away"
- Released: July 1976 (US)
- Recorded: September 1975 in Grasse, France
- Genre: Hard rock
- Length: 3:15
- Label: Swan Song, Island
- Songwriter(s): Paul Rodgers, Mick Ralphs, Boz Burrell, Simon Kirke
- Producer(s): Bad Company

Bad Company singles chronology
"Young Blood" (1976)	"Honey Child" (1976)	"Everything I Need" (1977)

"Honey Child" is a song by English hard rock supergroup Bad Company. The song was released as the third and final single from the band's third studio album Run with the Pack. It is one of the few Bad Company songs to be written by the entire band.

Cash Box said that the song is "hard rock ’n’ roll" with "a solid arrangement of music and voices" and that "the chorus is a good hook." Record World said it was "an audience favorite" on the band's tour preceding the single release.

== Track listing ==
No.	Title	Length
1.	"Honey Child"	3:15
2.	"Fade Away"	2:54

== Chart positions ==
Chart (1976)	Peak position
US	59
