= Bad Company (album) =

1974 debut album by Bad Company

Studio album by Bad Company
- Released: 24 May 1974
- Recorded: November 1973
- Studios: Headley Grange, East Hampshire, England
- Genres: Blues rock; hard rock
- Length: 34:45
- Labels: Island (UK); Swan Song (US)
- Producer: Bad Company

Bad Company chronology
Bad Company (1974)	Straight Shooter (1975)

Singles from Bad Company
- 1. "Can't Get Enough" Released: 10 May 1974; 2. "Movin' On" Released: January 1975 (US)

Professional ratings
Review scores
Source	Rating
AllMusic	4.5/5 stars
Christgau's Record Guide	B−
Rolling Stone	favourable
Encyclopedia of Popular Music	4/5 stars

Bad Company is the debut studio album by Bad Company, a 1970s English hard rock supergroup. The album was recorded at Headley Grange with Ronnie Lane's Mobile Studio in November 1973, and it was the second album released on Led Zeppelin's Swan Song Records label.

Among the songs recorded during the album sessions were two covers of tracks originally by members' previous bands — specifically, Mott the Hoople's "Ready for Love" (recorded while Mick Ralphs was with the band and released on their 1972 album All the Young Dudes) and "Easy on My Soul" (recorded by Paul Rodgers and Simon Kirke with Free and released on Heartbreaker in 1973). The latter did not make the final album, but was released as the B-side to second single "Movin' On".

== Reception and legacy ==
The album reached the top of the US Billboard 200. Since then, the album has been certified five times platinum by the RIAA, and became the 46th best selling album of the 1970s. The album spent 25 weeks in the UK Albums Chart, entering at No. 10 on 15 June 1974, and reaching its highest position of No. 3 in the second week. Kerrang! magazine listed the album at No. 40 among the "100 Greatest Heavy Metal Albums of All Time". The album was also included in the book 1001 Albums You Must Hear Before You Die. In 2000 it was voted number 323 in Colin Larkin's All Time Top 1000 Albums.

The singles "Can't Get Enough" and "Movin' On" peaked at No. 5 and No. 19 on the Billboard Hot 100, respectively. "Rock Steady", "Bad Company" and "Ready for Love" are also classic rock radio staples.

Ultimate Classic Rock critic Matt Wardlaw named four songs from Bad Company – "Bad Company", "Can't Get Enough", "Ready for Love" and "Seagull" – to be among Bad Company's 10 greatest songs.

== Versions ==
The album was remastered and re-released in 1994. In 2006 an audiophile mastered 24K gold CD was released by Audio Fidelity.

== Track listing ==
Side one
No.	Title	Writer(s)	Length
1.	"Can't Get Enough"	Mick Ralphs	4:17
2.	"Rock Steady"	Paul Rodgers	3:47
3.	"Ready for Love"	Ralphs	5:03
4.	"Don't Let Me Down"	Rodgers, Ralphs	4:22

Side two
No.	Title	Writer(s)	Length
5.	"Bad Company"	Rodgers, Simon Kirke	4:51
6.	"The Way I Choose"	Rodgers	5:06
7.	"Movin' On"	Ralphs	3:24
8.	"Seagull"	Rodgers, Ralphs	4:04

2015 reissue disc two
No.	Title	Writer(s)	Length
1.	"Can't Get Enough" (Take 8)	Ralphs	4:21
2.	"Little Miss Fortune" (Demo Reel 1)	Rodgers, Ralphs	3:58
3.	"The Way I Choose" (Demo Reel 1)	Ralphs	6:39
4.	"Bad Company" (Session Reel 2)	Rodgers, Kirke	4:40
5.	"The Way I Choose" (Version 1 Including False Start)	Ralphs	7:16
6.	"Easy on My Soul" (long version)	Rodgers	6:15
7.	"Bad Company" (Session Reel 8)	Rodgers, Kirke	5:33
8.	"Studio Chat / Dialogue"		0:23
9.	"Superstar Woman" (long version)	Rodgers	6:11
10.	"Can't Get Enough" (single edit)	Ralphs	3:30
11.	"Little Miss Fortune" (B-side of "Can't Get Enough")	Rodgers, Ralphs	3:51
12.	"Easy on My Soul" (B-side of "Movin' On")	Rodgers	4:41
13.	"Can't Get Enough" (Hammond Version)	Ralphs	4:23

== Non-album tracks ==
1. "Little Miss Fortune" (Rodgers, Ralphs) – 3:52
  - Released as the B-side of the "Can't Get Enough" single.
1. "Easy On My Soul" (Rodgers) – 4:39
  - Released as the B-side of the "Movin' On" single.

== Personnel ==
Bad Company

- Paul Rodgers – vocals, piano (4, 5), rhythm (1) and acoustic (8) guitars, tambourine (8)
- Mick Ralphs – lead guitar (all but 8), keyboards (3)
- Boz Burrell – bass (all but 8)
- Simon Kirke – drums (all but 8)

Additional personnel

- Sue Glover and Sunny Leslie – backing vocals (4)
- Mel Collins – saxophones (6)
- Ron Fawcus – tape operator
- Hipgnosis – sleeve design, photography
- Ron Nevison – engineer, mixing
- Steve Hoffman – mastering
- Barry Diament – mastering
- Beverly Taddei – production co-ordination
- Bob Wynne – art direction

== Charts ==
=== Weekly charts ===
Weekly chart performance for Bad Company
Chart (1974–1975)	Peak position
Australian Albums (Kent Music Report)	6
Canada Top Albums/CDs (RPM)	7
German Albums (Offizielle Top 100)	45
New Zealand Albums (RMNZ)	27
Norwegian Albums (VG-lista)	17
UK Albums (Official Charts)	3
US Billboard 200	1

2021 weekly chart performance for Bad Company
Chart (2023)	Peak position
Hungarian Physical Albums (MAHASZ)	30

=== Year-end charts ===
Year-end chart performance for Bad Company
Chart (1974)	Position
Australian Albums (Kent Music Report)	24
Canada Top Albums/CDs (RPM)	40

== Certifications ==
Certifications for Bad Company
Region	Certification	Certified units/sales
Canada (Music Canada)	Gold	50,000^{^}
United Kingdom (BPI)	Gold	100,000^{^}
United States (RIAA)	5× Platinum	5,000,000^{^}
^{^} Shipments figures based on certification alone.
