= Movin' On (Bad Company song) =

Single by Bad Company

from the album Bad Company
- B-side: "Easy on My Soul"
- Released: January 1975 (US)
- Recorded: November 1973
- Venue: Headley Grange, Hampshire, England
- Genre: Blues rock
- Length: 3:21
- Label: Island; Swan Song
- Songwriter: Mick Ralphs
- Producer: Bad Company

Bad Company singles chronology
"Can't Get Enough" (1974)	"Movin' On" (1975)	"Good Lovin' Gone Bad" (1975)

"Movin' On" is a song written by Mick Ralphs that was first released as a single by Hackensack in 1972. It was later most famously included on Bad Company's debut album, on which Ralphs played guitar. "Movin' On" was also released as the second single from the album, as a follow-up to "Can't Get Enough" and reached #19 on the Billboard Hot 100 and #30 in Canada.

== Music and lyrics ==
Allmusic critic Stephen Thomas Erlewine described "Movin' On" as a blues boogie. Billboard described it as a "perfect 'driving' song" and praised Paul Rodgers' vocal performance, Ralph's "staccato guitar work" and the "pounding rhythm section. Record World said the song "has as much going for it as [Bad Company's] groundbreaking 'Can't Get Enough'" and that "Mick Ralphs tune is locomotion in action." Detroit Free Press critic Dana Sue Jackson described "Movin' On" as a "harder, lunging number" with a good beat for dancing. St. Joseph News-Press critic Terry Jordan described the melody as "fascinating."

The Washington Court House Record-Herald described the lyrics as fitting a roadie's lifestyle, e.g., "And I'm Movin' On/Movin' from town to town/I got to move on/Never seem to touch the ground."

== Personnel ==
- Paul Rodgers – vocals
- Mick Ralphs – guitar
- Boz Burrell – bass
- Simon Kirke – drums

== Reception ==
Classic Rock History critic Janey Roberts rated "Movin' On" as Bad Company's 7th greatest song, calling it "one of the most soulful songs that Bad Company ever released." Roberts said that it was an "FM deep tracks radio favorite in the 1970’s" and one of Bad Company's "most soulful songs." The 100 Greatest Bands of All Time: A Guide to the Legends Who Rocked the World described "Movin' On" as one of Bad Company's "most well-known and beloved hits." Cincinnati Enquirer reporter Jim Knippenberg as one of the best songs on Bad Company for "mass consumption." Rolling Stone critic Bud Scoppa said that "Movin' On" contains "nothing that hasn’t been done a thousand times before, but...sounds irresistibly fresh." The Gazette critic Bill Mann described "Movin' On" as one of the strongest songs on Bad Company (along with "Can't Get Enough") and particularly praised the "strong yet economical drumming." Cash Box said that "Paul Rodgers' vocals complement the soaring lead guitar of Mick Ralphs while Boz Burrell and Simon Kirke serve as the rhythmic roots."

"Movin' On" was later released on Bad Company's 1985 compilation album 10 from 6. Live versions have also been released on several of Bad Company's live albums, such as Live at Wembley.
