= Straight Shooter (Bad Company album) =

1975 studio album by Bad Company

Studio album by Bad Company
- Released: 28 March 1975
- Recorded: September 1974
- Studios: Clearwell Castle, Gloucestershire, England
- Genres: Hard rock; blues rock
- Length: 38:17
- Labels: Island (UK); Swan Song (US)
- Producer: Bad Company

Bad Company chronology
Bad Company (1974)	Straight Shooter (1975)	Run with the Pack (1976)

Singles from Straight Shooter
- 1. "Good Lovin' Gone Bad" Released: March 1975; 2. "Feel Like Makin' Love" Released: June 1975 (US)

Straight Shooter is the second studio album by the English hard rock supergroup Bad Company. The album was released on 28 March 1975.

The album reached number 3 on both the UK Albums Chart and the US Billboard 200. It was certified gold (500,000 units sold) by the Recording Industry Association of America a month after its release. The album was remastered and re-released in 1994.

The track "Shooting Star" (written by lead singer Paul Rodgers) was lyrically inspired by the drug and alcohol-related deaths of guitarist Jimi Hendrix and other rock musicians.

== Background ==
In May 1974, Bad Company released their self-titled debut album. Three months later, the band and recording engineer Ron Nevison recorded at least eight songs at Clearwell Castle in Gloucestershire, England. Sometime later Nevison mixed the songs for Straight Shooter at Air Studios in London. The sleeve for the album was designed by Hipgnosis, who also designed their debut album.

The first single from the album, "Good Lovin' Gone Bad", was released in March 1975 and reached No. 36 on the Billboard Hot 100. The album's final single "Feel like Makin' Love" was released in June and reached No. 10 on the Hot 100.

== Critical reception ==
Professional ratings
Review scores
Source	Rating
AllMusic	4/5 stars
Christgau's Record Guide	B−
The Rolling Stone Record Guide	3/5 stars

Robert Christgau felt that although Straight Shooter was better than its predecessor, it should not be labelled hard rock because Paul Rodgers did not have a strong voice, which is needed to be a rock singer.

Ed Naha's feeling of the album, as stated in Rolling Stone, was much more favourable than Christgau's. Naha thought that, with their second album, Bad Company was proving that they would not end up like Mott the Hoople, Free, or King Crimson—bands that Bad Company's members used to be part of. Naha also thought that Simon Kirke's "Anna" was as bad as it was when it was first recorded, but that "Weep No More" showed that he was progressing as a writer, while Boz Burrell was also making progress on the bass.

Gautam Baksi's review of the album for AllMusic said that the album's popularity was attributed to the ballads "Shooting Star" and "Feel like Makin' Love", while the two songs written by Simon Kirke—"Anna" and "Weep No More"—as well as the album not having enough supporting songs and follow-up singles, were what made the album less successful than its predecessor.

== Track listing ==
Side one
No.	Title	Writer(s)	Length
1.	"Good Lovin' Gone Bad"	Mick Ralphs	3:35
2.	"Feel Like Makin' Love"	Paul Rodgers, Ralphs	5:12
3.	"Weep No More"	Simon Kirke	3:59
4.	"Shooting Star"	Rodgers	6:16

Side two
No.	Title	Writer(s)	Length
5.	"Deal with the Preacher"	Rodgers, Ralphs	5:01
6.	"Wild Fire Woman"	Rodgers, Ralphs	4:32
7.	"Anna"	Kirke	3:41
8.	"Call on Me"	Rodgers	6:03

2015 reissue disc two
No.	Title	Writer(s)	Length
1.	"Good Lovin' Gone Bad" (Alternate Vocal & Guitar)	Ralphs	3:21
2.	"Feel Like Makin' Love" (Take Before Master)	Rodgers, Ralphs	5:44
3.	"Weep No More" (Early Slow Version)	Kirke	5:07
4.	"Shooting Star" (Alternate Take)	Rodgers	5:33
5.	"Deal with the Preacher" (Early Version)	Rodgers, Ralphs	5:40
6.	"Anna" (Alternate Vocal)	Kirke	3:42
7.	"Call on Me" (Alternate Take)	Rodgers	5:45
8.	"Easy on My Soul" (Slow Version)	Rodgers	6:47
9.	"Whiskey Bottle" (Early Slow Version)	Rodgers, Ralphs, Kirke, Boz Burrell	3:45
10.	"See the Sunlight" (Previously Unreleased)	Rodgers, Ralphs	4:40
11.	"All Night Long" (Previously Unreleased)	Rodgers	4:47
12.	"Wild Fire Woman" (Alternate Vocal & Guitar)	Rodgers, Ralphs	4:10
13.	"Feel like Makin' Love" (Harmonica Version)	Rodgers, Ralphs	5:52
14.	"Whiskey Bottle" (B-Side of "Good Lovin' Gone Bad")	Rodgers, Ralphs, Kirke, Burrell	3:48

== Non-album tracks ==
1. "Whiskey Bottle" (Rodgers, Ralphs, Burrell) – 3:44
  - Released as the B-side of the "Good Lovin' Gone Bad" single.

== Personnel ==
Personnel taken from Straight Shooter liner notes.

Bad Company

- Paul Rodgers – vocals, guitar, piano
- Mick Ralphs – guitar, keyboards
- Boz Burrell – bass
- Simon Kirke – drums

Additional musician

- Jimmy Horowitz – strings on "Weep No More"

Production

- Bad Company – production
- Ron Nevison – recording, mixing
- George Marino – mastering
- Hipgnosis – sleeve design

== Charts ==
Weekly charts

Chart (1975)	Peak position
Australian Albums (Kent Music Report)	8
Canada Top Albums/CDs (RPM)	3
Dutch Albums (Album Top 100)	19
Finnish Albums (The Official Finnish Charts)	13
German Albums (Offizielle Top 100)	47
New Zealand Albums (RMNZ)	13
Norwegian Albums (VG-lista)	6
UK Albums (Official Charts)	3
US Billboard 200	3

Chart (2026)	Peak position
Hungarian Physical Albums (MAHASZ)	19
Hungarian Vinyl Albums (MAHASZ)	10

Year-end charts

Chart (1975)	Position
UK Albums (OCC)	33

== Certifications and sales ==
Region	Certification	Certified units/sales
Canada (Music Canada)	Gold	50,000^{^}
United Kingdom (BPI)	Gold	100,000^{^}
United States (RIAA)	3× Platinum	3,000,000^{^}
^{^} Shipments figures based on certification alone.
