= Burnin' Sky (song) =

Single by Bad Company

from the album Burnin' Sky
- B-side: "Everything I Need"
- Released: May 1977 (US)
- Recorded: July–August 1976
- Studio: Château d'Hérouville, Hérouville, France
- Genre: Blues rock; hard rock
- Length: 3:28 (Single)/5:10 (Album)
- Label: Swan Song; Island
- Songwriter(s): Paul Rodgers
- Producer(s): Bad Company

Bad Company singles chronology
"Everything I Need" (1977)	"Burnin' Sky" (1977)	"Rock 'n' Roll Fantasy" (1979)

"Burnin' Sky" is a song written by Paul Rodgers and first released by English hard rock supergroup Bad Company. The song was released as the second and final single from the band's fourth studio album of the same name.

Rodgers made up most of the lyrics while recording the song in one take, as he had come to the studio having only determined the basic idea for the song and its chords.

Cash Box said that "thunder and lightning introduce this funky title track" and that "along with Paul Rodgers' filtered voice, a prominent electric piano and cleaner guitar sound figure into the group's new approach."

Classic Rock History critic Janey Roberts rated it as Bad Company's 9th best song, saying that "There was a rhythmic sense to the tune that had never been utilized by the band before." Ultimate Classic Rock critic Matt Wardlaw rated it as Bad Company's 7th best song. Classic Rock critic Malcolm Dome rated it as Bad Company's 8th best song, noting the "ominous, almost dark atmosphere" and "effectively heavy" musicianship.

== Track listing ==
No.	Title	Length
1.	"Burnin' Sky"	5:10
2.	"Everything I Need"	3:20

== Chart positions ==
Chart (1977)	Peak position
Canadian Singles (RPM)	73
US Hot 100 (Billboard)	78
