= Good Lovin' Gone Bad =

Single by Bad Company

from the album Straight Shooter
- B-side: "Whiskey Bottle"
- Released: March 1975
- Recorded: September 1974
- Genre: Hard rock
- Length: 3:35
- Label: Swan Song, Island
- Songwriter(s): Mick Ralphs
- Producer(s): Bad Company

Bad Company singles chronology
"Movin' On" (1974)	"Good Lovin' Gone Bad" (1975)	"Feel Like Makin' Love" (1975)

Audio
- "Good Lovin' Gone Bad" on YouTube

"Good Lovin' Gone Bad" is a song by the British rock band Bad Company. Released in 1975, it reached the Top 40 in both the United States and the UK. The song was written by the band's guitarist Mick Ralphs and appears on their second album, Straight Shooter.

Billboard described it as a "raucous, smashing assault" and praised the vocal performance and the guitar playing. Cash Box called it a "solid, quality rocker". Record World said that Bad Company "[lets] loose with new bold 'n' basic boogie".

Classic Rock History critic Janey Roberts rated it as Bad Company's sixth-best song, calling it "pure straight ahead rock and roll". Classic Rock critic Malcolm Dome rated it as Bad Company's fifth-best song, calling it "a powerful statement of good time intent".

== Track listing ==
No.	Title	Length
1.	"Good Lovin' Gone Bad"	3:35
2.	"Whiskey Bottle"	3:46

== Chart positions ==
Chart (1974)	Peak position
UK	31
CAN	48
US	36
AUS	93
