= Rock 'n' Roll Fantasy =

- Single sleeve

Single by Bad Company

from the album Desolation Angels
- B-side: "Crazy Circles"
- Released: March 1979
- Recorded: 1978
- Studio: Ridge Farm Studios, Surrey, England
- Genre: Hard rock; arena rock
- Length: 3:15
- Label: Swan Song
- Songwriter(s): Paul Rodgers
- Producer(s): Bad Company

Bad Company singles chronology
"Burnin' Sky" (1977)	"Rock 'n' Roll Fantasy" (1979)	"Gone, Gone, Gone" (1979)

Audio
- "Rock 'n' Roll Fantasy" on YouTube

"Rock 'n' Roll Fantasy" is a song by British rock band Bad Company. It was written by vocalist Paul Rodgers and released as the first single from the group's 1979's studio album, Desolation Angels. It is one of Bad Company's best-known songs and has become a staple of classic rock radio.

== Background ==
"Rock 'n' Roll Fantasy" was inspired by a guitar synthesizer riff that Paul Rodgers had come up with. While not the band's highest charting single in America, it is their best selling, having been certified Gold by the RIAA.

== Reception ==
Cash Box said "Rock 'n' Roll Fantasy" has a "stout beat and heavy fuzz guitar sound and excellent singing" as well as "solid" production. Record World called it "a hard rocker with a sure shot at AOR and Top 40 play" and praised Rodgers' lead vocals as being "inspired". Democrat and Chronicle critic Jack Garner said it "contains the most varying material yet from the band, indicating continued growth and maturity on their part." AllMusic reviewer Mike DeGagne commented on Rodgers' "vocal passion" on the song. AllMusic critic Stephen Thomas Erlewine regarded it as one of the band's best "big, brawny arena rockers" and noted that it's a "quintessential classic rock staple".

In 2016, Classic Rock ranked the song at number nine on their list of Bad Company's 10 best songs, praising Ralphs' "curt, sharp [guitar] solo" and the "clipped rhythmic accompaniment" from drummer Simon Kirke and bassist Boz Burrell. Classic Rock History critic Janey Roberts rated it as Bad Company's eighth best song. Ultimate Classic Rock critic Matt Wardlaw rated it as Bad Company's fourth best song, saying that it "is probably one of the best songs ever written about what it's like living life as a star in the music business."

== Track listing ==
No.	Title	Length
1.	"Rock 'n' Roll Fantasy"	3:15
2.	"Crazy Circles"	3:31

== Chart performance ==
The song peaked at number 13 on the US Billboard Hot 100 in 1979, ultimately climbing to number 54 for the Billboard Year-End singles chart in that year.

=== Weekly charts ===
Chart (1979)	Peak position
Australia (Kent Music Report)	65
Canada RPM Top Singles	16
US Billboard Hot 100	13
US Cash Box Top 100	11

=== Year-end charts ===
Chart (1979)	Rank
US Billboard Hot 100	54
US Cash Box	79
