= Bad Company (song) =

1974 song from the hard rock band Bad Company

Song by Bad Company

from the album Bad Company
- Released: 1974
- Recorded: November 1973
- Genre: Hard rock
- Length: 4:50
- Label: Swan Song; Island
- Songwriters: Simon Kirke; Paul Rodgers
- Producer: Bad Company

"Bad Company" is a song by the hard rock band Bad Company that was released on their debut album Bad Company in 1974. Co-written by the group's lead singer Paul Rodgers and drummer Simon Kirke, the song's meaning comes from a book on Victorian morals. Ultimate Classic Rock described the song as having a "western vibe" and Rodgers has said that it has "an almost biblical, promise-land kind of lawless feel to it."

== Reception ==
Ultimate Classic Rock critic Matt Wardlaw rated it as Bad Company's all-time best song, particularly praising the "legendary piano opening." Classic Rock critic Malcolm Dome also rated it as Bad Company's best song, praising the "dusty atmosphere [as well as] Rodgers' almost enigmatic vocals and [Mick] Ralphs' haunting guitar chime." Classic Rock History critic Janey Roberts rated it as Bad Company's 4th best song, praising the "haunting piano riff that oozed around Paul Rodgers silk vocal line" at the start of the song as well as the "powerhouse chorus."

== Personnel ==
- Paul Rodgers – vocals, piano
- Mick Ralphs – guitar
- Boz Burrell – bass
- Simon Kirke – drums

== Five Finger Death Punch cover ==
"Bad Company"

Single by Five Finger Death Punch

from the album War Is the Answer
- Released: 17 May 2010
- Recorded: 2009
- Genre: Alternative metal; hard rock
- Length: 4:22
- Label: Prospect Park
- Songwriters: Simon Kirke; Paul Rodgers
- Producer: Kevin Churko

Five Finger Death Punch singles chronology
| "No One Gets Left Behind" (2010) | "Bad Company" (2010) | "Far from Home" (2010) |

Music video
- "Bad Company" on YouTube

Five Finger Death Punch frequently performs a cover of this song live, and recorded the song for their second album War Is the Answer. The song has a significantly heavier tone to it, along with several lyrical edits ("I was born a shotgun in my hands", "the death punch sound is our claim to fame"). The song has been used as entrance music by pitchers Drew Storen, Jake Arrieta and Madison Bumgarner.

=== Track listing ===
UK digital download
| No. | Title | Length |
|---|---|---|
| 1. | "Bad Company" | 4:22 |
| 2. | "The Devil's Own" (live) | 4:54 |

Promo CD
| No. | Title | Length |
|---|---|---|
| 1. | "Bad Company (radio edit)" | 3:57 |
| 2. | "Bad Company (album version)" | 4:23 |

=== Charts ===
==== Weekly charts ====
| Chart (2010–2011) | Peak position |
|---|---|
| Canada Rock (Billboard) | 17 |
| US Bubbling Under Hot 100 (Billboard) | 6 |
| US Alternative Airplay (Billboard) | 26 |
| US Mainstream Rock (Billboard) | 2 |
| US Hot Rock & Alternative Songs (Billboard) | 7 |

==== Year-end charts ====
| Chart (2010) | Position |
|---|---|
| US Hot Rock & Alternative Songs (Billboard) | 29 |

=== Certifications ===
| Region | Certification | Certified units/sales |
|---|---|---|
| Denmark (IFPI Danmark) | Gold | 45,000^{‡} |
| New Zealand (RMNZ) | Platinum | 30,000^{‡} |
| United Kingdom (BPI) | Silver | 200,000^{‡} |
| United States (RIAA) | Platinum | 1,000,000^{^} |
^{^} Shipments figures based on certification alone.^{‡} Sales+streaming figures based on certification alone.

=== Band members ===
- Zoltan Bathory – guitars
- Jason Hook – guitars (original 5FDP version]
- Ivan Moody – vocals
- Matt Snell – bass (original 5FDP version)
- Jeremy Spencer – drums (original 5FDP version)
- Chris Kael – bass (re-recorded version)
- Andy James – guitars (re-recorded version)
- Charlie Engen – drums (re-recorded version)

== Other notable covers ==
Rickie Lee Jones recorded a version of the song which was used as the opening track of her cover album Kicks.

In 2025, Charley Crockett covered the song for the tribute album Can't Get Enough: A Tribute To Bad Company along with the band, serving as one of the album's lead singles.
