= Can't Get Enough (Bad Company song) =

- Cover of the 1974 German single

Single by Bad Company

from the album Bad Company
- B-side: "Little Miss Fortune"
- Released: 10 May 1974
- Recorded: November 1973; Headley Grange, Hampshire, England
- Genre: Hard rock; blues rock
- Length: 4:17
- Label: Island; Swan Song
- Songwriter: Mick Ralphs
- Producer: Bad Company

Bad Company singles chronology
"Can't Get Enough" (1974)	"Movin' On" (1974)

Official audio
- "Can't Get Enough" on YouTube

"Can't Get Enough" is a song by English guitarist Mick Ralphs. It was recorded by rock supergroup Bad Company, of which Ralphs was a member, for their 1974 self-titled debut album, and was issued as their debut single. It reached No. 5 on the Billboard Hot 100 singles chart and No. 1 on Cashbox magazine's Top 100 Singles chart. "Can't Get Enough" is Bad Company's biggest hit and is considered their most popular song; it is frequently played on classic rock radio stations.

== Composition ==
The song is credited to guitarist Mick Ralphs, who tuned his guitar in the open-C tuning C-C-G-C-E-C. Ralphs said: "It never really sounds right in standard tuning. It needs the open C to have that ring." It borrows from the riff Ralphs used for his 1972 Mott the Hoople song "One of the Boys".

== Reception ==
Billboard described "Can't Get Enough" as a "good, solid rocker" and praised Paul Rodgers' vocal performance. Cash Box called it "one of the best rockers to come out of Britain in years", describing it as "Top 40 oriented with a heavier flair". Record World said that "lead singer Paul Rodgers is just enough of a controlled powerhouse to turn this into a solid top 40 item."

Classic Rock critic Malcolm Dome rated it as Bad Company's second-best song, saying that it "combines a shuffling riff with a classy melody, all done with a big production that still sounds intimate". Classic Rock History critic Janey Roberts rated it as Bad Company's third-best song, saying that "the three chord progression to 'Can't Get Enough' became a favorite of young guitar players growing up in the 1970s." Ultimate Classic Rock critic Matt Wardlaw rated it as Bad Company's fifth-best song, saying that the song "finds Paul Rodgers exuding complete confidence in his ability to land the girl that he wants".

== Personnel ==
- Paul Rodgers - vocals, rhythm guitar
- Mick Ralphs - lead guitar
- Boz Burrell - bass
- Simon Kirke - drums

== Track listing ==
7" vinyl

No.	Title	Length
1.	"Can't Get Enough"	4:17
2.	"Little Miss Fortune"	3:55

45 RPM

No.	Title	Length
1.	"Can't Get Enough"	4:17
2.	"Bad Company"	4:47

== Charts ==
Chart (1974)	Peak position
Canada Top Singles (RPM)	3
UK Singles Chart (The Official Charts Company)	15
US Billboard Hot 100	5
US Cash Box Top 100	1
