= Boz Burrell =

British singer and bassist (1946–2006)

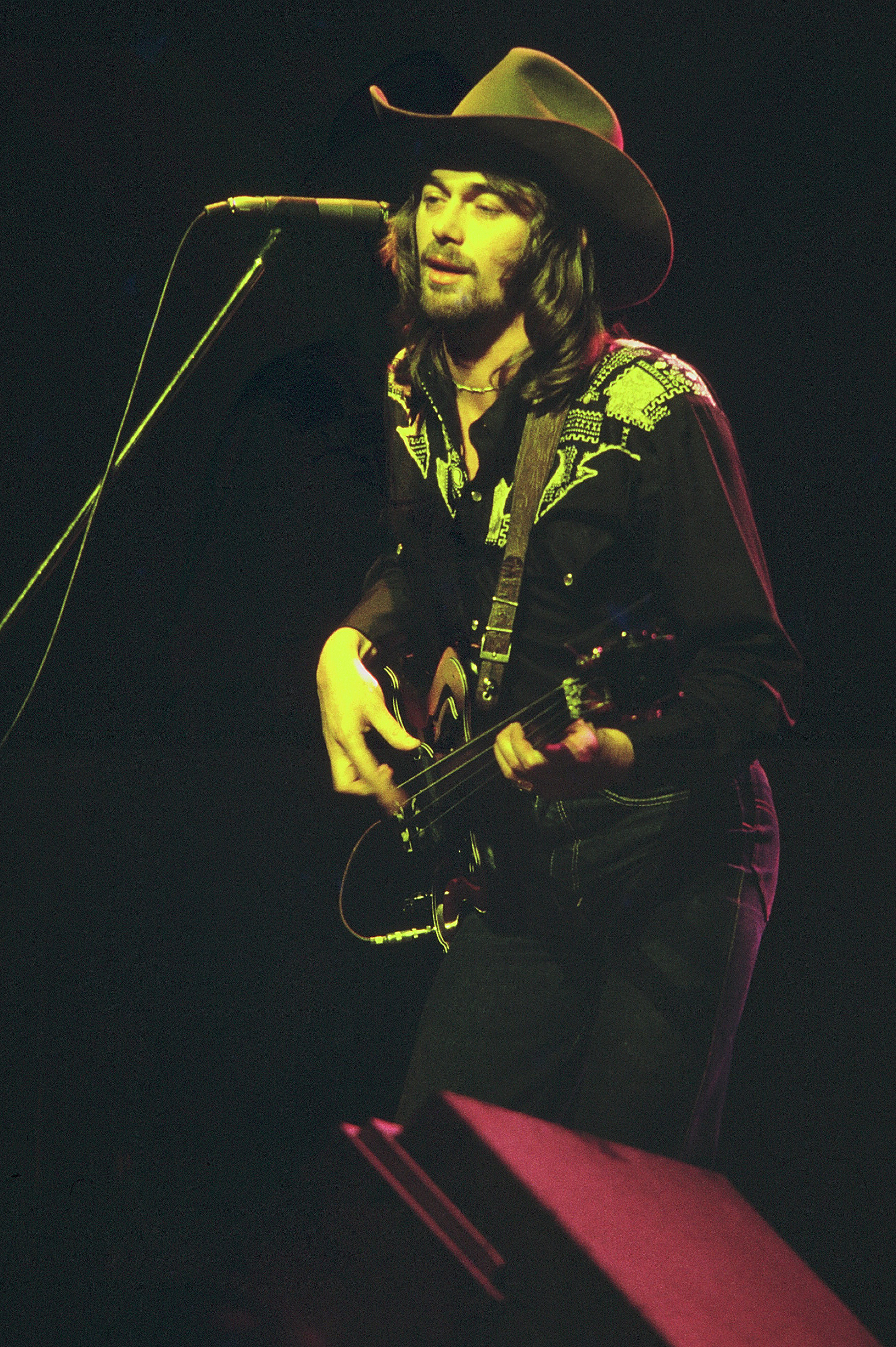
- Burrell performing with Bad Company in 1976

Background information
- Born: Raymond Burrell; 1 August 1946; Holbeach, Lincolnshire, England
- Died: 21 September 2006 (aged 60) Marbella, Spain
- Genres: Hard rock; blues-rock; progressive rock; jazz fusion
- Occupations: Musician; singer-songwriter
- Instruments: Bass; vocals; guitar
- Years active: 1963–2006
- Labels: Swan Song; Island; Virgin
- Formerly of: The Tea Time 4; Boz People; Feel For Soul; Centipede; King Crimson; Snape; Chapman Whitney Streetwalkers; Bad Company; Boxer; Roger Chapman & The Shortlist; Nightfly; The Shoe String Band; Celtic Groove Connection

Raymond "Boz" Burrell (1 August 1946 – 21 September 2006) was an English musician. Originally a vocalist and guitarist, Burrell is best known for being the vocalist and bassist of King Crimson from 1971 to 1972 and the original bassist of Bad Company from 1973 to their first disbandment in 1982 and once more from 1998 to 1999. He died of a heart attack in Spain in 2006, aged 60.

== Biography ==
=== Early years ===
Raymond Burrell was born on 1 August 1946 in Holbeach, Lincolnshire; he lived in Saracens Head and Holbeach Hurn. As a teen in the 1950s, he began playing rhythm guitar for the Tea Time 4, a group formed with his school pals Bernie Rudd and Brian Rocky Browne, at the George Farmer School. They both acquired a passion for jazz and enjoyed acts such as Mose Allison, John Coltrane, and Charles Mingus. He later attended King's Lynn Technical College.

The group had several personnel changes and moved to London in 1965 at the suggestion of manager, Jack Barrie. With the addition of Ian McLagan on keyboard and a name change to Boz People, the group secured a contract with EMI's Columbia label.

Burrell's style leaned more towards jazz, whereas McLagan was into Booker T, four singles being recorded and backing band slots with Kenny Lynch and Elkie Brooks. However, with little commercial success, McLagan soon left to join The Small Faces.

Burrell next enjoyed a short stint in the soul band, Feel For Soul, back in Norwich from 1966 until the following year. In late 1965, Burrell was briefly considered to replace Roger Daltrey in The Who.

Between 1966 and 1968, Burrell released six singles in Britain on the Columbia label under the name Boz, including a cover of "I Shall be Released", backed by "Down in the Flood" (wrongly named "Dove in the Flood" on the label), both written by Bob Dylan. On this he was joined by organist Jon Lord, guitarist Ritchie Blackmore and drummer Ian Paice, who formed Deep Purple at the same time, and bassist Chas Hodges, later of Chas and Dave fame. Burrell later appeared on Centipede's 1971 recording Septober Energy.

=== King Crimson ===
In 1971, Burrell joined King Crimson as the new vocalist, having met Robert Fripp while both were performing with Centipede. As well as a vocalist, the band were also in search of a new bass player. After Rick Kemp turned down a last-minute offer to join, Burrell (who had only limited guitar-playing ability) was installed as the band's bass player with Fripp and Ian Wallace teaching him to play rather than start the search again.

The band toured and recorded the band's fourth studio album, Islands (1971), a warmer sounding release and the band's only string ensemble experimentation. Tensions began socially on tour and creatively with the direction of the group's latest effort. This led to lyricist Peter Sinfield being ousted following the band's next tour. During rehearsals in early 1972 the band fell apart with all members leaving due to creative restrictions imposed by Fripp as a "quality control" measure.

The band members were convinced to rejoin and fulfil their touring commitments for that year with the intention of disbanding thereafter. Recordings from this subsequent tour exist as the live album Earthbound (1972) and as a large part of the box set Sailors' Tales (1970–1972) (2017), which contains studio and live recordings spanning Burrell's entire tenure in the band. Although relations improved between both parties leading to an offer from the musicians to continue on in the band, Fripp had already moved on and declined to participate.

In 1973, Burrell, Wallace and Mel Collins reunited with Sinfield for his solo effort, Still. They also went on to form Snape with CCS's Alexis Korner and Peter Thorup, who had been on tour with King Crimson in the states the previous year, releasing the studio album, Accidentally Born in New Orleans, and a live album, Live on Tour in Germany. In 1974 Burrell featured with Chapman Whitney Streetwalkers along with other members of Family and King Crimson.

=== Bad Company ===
Burrell was a founding member of the supergroup Bad Company, formed in 1973 along with ex-Mott the Hoople guitarist Mick Ralphs and two former members of Free: vocalist Paul Rodgers and drummer Simon Kirke. The band debuted in 1974 with the self-titled Bad Company, which eventually went platinum, as did the 1975 follow-up, Straight Shooter and 1976's Run with the Pack.

Released in 1977, Burnin' Sky proved less successful. However, the group's fifth release, Desolation Angels (release in 1979), saw the band once again return to platinum status. Rough Diamonds, the final studio album featuring the original members, released in 1982, was the worst-selling album in this incarnation and the band soon after split.

Using the name Bad Company, Ralphs and Kirke continued to play together. However, it was not until 1998 that Burrell rejoined his bandmates along with Rodgers for a reunion tour; they released four new songs and released the compilation The 'Original' Bad Co. Anthology. Burrell left the band once again in 1999.

=== Later work ===
In January 1981, Burrell joined Roger Chapman again for his solo band, The Shortlist, leaving in 1983. He returned in May 1987, but left again the following year in June. In 1982, Burrell contributed to Jon Lord's solo album, Before I Forget, on the track "Hollywood Rock and Roll", and in 1984 he joined the short-lived Nightfly.

In the 1990s, Burrell worked with such acts as Alvin Lee for his Best of British Blues tour of 1996 and Ruby Turner. During this period, his main creative outlet was with the Scottish blues singer Tam White. Their collaboration developed into a trio known as The Shoe String Band and a big band, the Celtic Groove Connection. White was present at Burrell's apartment in Spain when Burrell suddenly died of a heart attack during rehearsals, on 21 September 2006.

In 2025, Burrell was inducted into Rock and Roll Hall of Fame as a member of Bad Company.

== Discography ==
solo as Boz

- "Isn't That So" / "You're Just the Kind of Girl I Want" (11 Feb 1966) (single)
- "Meeting Time" / "No (Ah) Body Knows Blues" (7 Apr 1966) (single)
- "Pinocchio" / "Stay as You Are" (10 Jun 1966) (single)
- "The Baby Song" / "Carry on Screaming" (29 Jul 1966) (single)
- "I Shall Be Released" / "Down in the Flood" (3 May 1968) (single)
- "Light My Fire" / "Back Against the Wall" (16 Aug 1968) (single)

with Duster Bennett

- Jumpin' at Shadows (1965)

with Centipede

- Septober Energy (1971)

with King Crimson

- Islands (1971)
- Earthbound (1972)
- Ladies of the Road (2002)
- Sailors’ Tales (1970 – 1972), 27-disc boxed set (2017)

with Pete Sinfield

- Still (1973)

with Snape

- Accidentally Born in New Orleans (1973)
- Live on Tour in Germany (1973)

with Bad Company

Main article: Bad Company discography
- Bad Company (1974)
- Straight Shooter (1975)
- Run with the Pack (1976)
- Burnin' Sky (1977)
- Desolation Angels (1979)
- Rough Diamonds (1982)
- 10 from 6 (1985)
- The 'Original' Bad Co. Anthology (1999)
- Live in Albuquerque 1976 (2006)

with Boxer

- Bloodletting (1979)

with Jon Lord

- Before I Forget (1982) Track 3 – "Hollywood Rock and Roll"

with The Shortlist

- He Was... She Was... You Was... We Was... (1982)
- Mango Crazy (1983)
- Riff Burglar (The Legendary Funny Cider Sessions – Vol. 1) (1988)

with Ken Hensley

- From Time to Time (1994)

with Ruby Turner

- Call Me by My Name (1998)

with Celtic Groove Connection

- Celtic Groove Connection (1999)
