= Rock and Roll Queen =

Greatest hits album by Mott the Hoople
- Released: October 1972 (UK); 1974 (US)
- Recorded: 1969–71
- Genre: Hard rock
- Length: 35:34
- Label: Island (UK/Canada); Atlantic (US)
- Producer: Guy Stevens (tracks 1–6); Shadow Morton (track 7); Mott the Hoople/Guy Stevens (track 8)

Mott the Hoople chronology
All the Young Dudes (1972)	Rock and Roll Queen (1972)	Mott (1973)

Professional ratings
Review scores
Source	Rating
Christgau's Record Guide	B+
Tom Hull	D+

Rock and Roll Queen is a compilation album by the British rock band Mott the Hoople. The album predominantly features selections from the four albums Mott recorded for Island Records in the UK, which were subsequently issued in the US by Atlantic Records. In Canada, the first three were released by Polydor, while Brain Capers was released in Canada by Island.

The album was initially released by Island Records UK in late 1972 (catalog no. ILPS 9215) following Mott's move to CBS/Columbia Records earlier that year, and the band's success with their first CBS/Columbia album All the Young Dudes. It was not initially issued in North America until February 1974 when Atlantic released it in the US (catalog no. SD 7297), and Island released it in Canada, after the release of Mott's second Columbia album Mott (1973). The release also shortly followed recording of ex-Mott guitarist Mick Ralphs's first album with his new band Bad Company, which was issued as the first release by Atlantic's affiliated label Swan Song Records in June 1974 in North America.

The album includes selections from all of Mott the Hoople's Island/Atlantic albums, as well as one non-LP track, as chosen by the band's early mentor and producer Guy Stevens. Stevens' selections might in some cases be viewed as questionable; in particular, his choices include a short edit of "The Wheel of the Quivering Meat Conception" (a coda to Ian Hunter's song "The Journey" on which Stevens took a songwriter's credit), and one track from Mott's largely self-produced album Wildlife that Stevens collaborated with them on, the live 1950s rock and roll medley "Keep A Knockin'." Regardless of this, however, critic Ira Robbins cited the album as having merit in his Trouser Press online retrospective of Ian Hunter's and Mott the Hoople's work: "Rock and Roll Queen ... omits 'Sweet Angeline' [from Mott's fourth album Brain Capers] and includes 'Keep A Knockin' but is otherwise a fair sampler of the band's Atlantic era."

== Track listing ==
Vocals on all tracks by Ian Hunter, except as noted.

1. "Rock and Roll Queen" (Mick Ralphs) – 5:06
  - From Mott the Hoople's first album Mott the Hoople (1969 UK, 1970 North America).
2. "The Wheel of the Quivering Meat Conception" (Ian Hunter, Guy Stevens) – 0:26
  - Edited version, from Mott the Hoople's fourth album Brain Capers (1971 UK, 1972 North America).
3. "You Really Got Me" (Ray Davies) – 2:53
  - From Mott the Hoople. Instrumental.
4. "Thunderbuck Ram" (Mick Ralphs) – 4:48
  - From Mott the Hoople's second album Mad Shadows (1970). Vocals by Mick Ralphs.
5. "Walkin' With a Mountain" (Ian Hunter) – 3:53
  - From Mad Shadows.
6. "Death May Be Your Santa Claus" (Ian Hunter, Verden Allen) – 4:54
  - From Brain Capers.
7. "Midnight Lady" (Ian Hunter, Mick Ralphs) – 3:28
  - Non-LP single recorded during the Brain Capers sessions, and released in 1972.
8. "Keep A-Knockin'" (Richard Penniman) – 10:06
  - From Mott the Hoople's third album Wildlife (1971). Recorded at Fairfield Halls, Croydon, UK in late 1970. Interpolates sections of "I Got A Woman" (by Ray Charles), "What'd I Say" (Charles) and "Whole Lotta Shakin' Goin' On" (Jerry Lee Lewis).

== Personnel ==
Mott the Hoople

- Ian Hunter - vocals, guitar, piano
- Mick Ralphs - guitar, vocals, backing vocals
- Pete Overend Watts - bass, backing vocals
- Dale "Buffin" Griffin - drums, backing vocals
- Verden Allen - organ, backing vocals
