= Fame and Fortune (Bad Company song) =

Single by Bad Company

from the album Fame and Fortune
- B-side: "When We Made Love"
- Released: 23 February 1987
- Genre: Hard rock
- Length: 3:35
- Label: Atlantic
- Songwriter(s): Mick Ralphs
- Producer(s): Keith Olsen

Bad Company singles chronology
"That Girl" (1986)	"Fame and Fortune" (1987)	"Shake It Up" (1988)

"Fame and Fortune" is a song by English rock band Bad Company. The song was released as the third and final single from the album of the same name. The track was written by guitarist Mick Ralphs.

"Fame and Fortune" peaked at #37 on the Billboard Mainstream Rock chart, the band's second lowest peak position on the chart.

== Track listing ==
Side A
No.	Title	Writer(s)	Length
1.	"Fame and Fortune"	Mick Ralphs	3:35

Side B
No.	Title	Writer(s)	Length
1.	"When We Made Love"	Brian Howe, Simon Kirke, John Bettis	4:18

== Personnel ==
- Brian Howe – vocals
- Mick Ralphs – guitar
- Steve Price – bass
- Simon Kirke – drums
