= Shake It Up (Bad Company song) =

Single by Bad Company

from the album Dangerous Age
- B-side: "Dangerous Age"
- Released: April 1989
- Genre: Hard rock
- Length: 3:56
- Label: Atlantic
- Songwriters: Brian Howe, Terry Thomas
- Producer: Terry Thomas

Bad Company singles chronology
"Fame and Fortune" (1986)	"Shake It Up" (1989)	"No Smoke Without a Fire" (1986)

"Shake It Up" is a song by English rock band Bad Company. The song was released as the lead single from the band's eighth studio album, Dangerous Age. Written by vocalist Brian Howe and producer Terry Thomas, the song fared much better than previous single "Fame and Fortune", which only peaked at #37 on the Billboard Mainstream Rock chart. "Shake It Up" was a top-10 hit on the chart, helping to re-establish the band's fame.

== Track listing ==
7" single

Side A
No.	Title	Writer(s)	Length
1.	"Shake It Up"	Brian Howe, Terry Thomas	3:56

Side B
No.	Title	Writer(s)	Length
1.	"Dangerous Age"	Mick Ralphs, Terry Thomas	3:45

Promo CD single

No.	Title	Length
1.	"Shake It Up"	3:56

== Charts ==
Chart (1988)	Peak position
Billboard Hot 100	82
Billboard Mainstream Rock Songs	9

== Personnel ==
Bad Company

- Brian Howe – lead vocals
- Mick Ralphs – guitar
- Steve Price – bass
- Simon Kirke – drums

Additional

- Terry Thomas – production, backing vocals
