= If You Needed Somebody =

1990 single by Bad Company

Single by Bad Company

from the album Holy Water
- Released: November 1990
- Length: 4:21
- Label: Atco
- Songwriters: Brian Howe; Terry Thomas
- Producer: Terry Thomas

Bad Company singles chronology
"Holy Water" (1990)	"If You Needed Somebody" (1990)	"Walk Through Fire" (1991)

"If You Needed Somebody" is a song by Bad Company, released in 1990 as the second single from their ninth album, Holy Water (1990).

The power ballad was the band's first top 40 hit since 1979's "Rock 'n' Roll Fantasy", peaking at No. 16 on the Billboard Hot 100.

== Charts ==
Chart (1990–1991)	Peak position
Canada Top Singles (RPM)	51
US Billboard Hot 100	16
US Album Rock Tracks (Billboard)	2
US Cash Box Top 100	15
