= Jeff Bova =

American musician (born 1953)

- Born: Jeffrey Bova; 1953 (age 72–73); Washington, D.C., U.S.
- Genres: Pop
- Occupations: Keyboardist; composer; arranger; record producer
- Instruments: Piano; synthesizer; keyboards; trumpet
- Years active: 1970s–present

Jeff Bova (born Jeffrey Bova in 1953) is an American musician. He has been active in the music industry since the mid-1970s, contributing to recordings by significant mainstream artists like Celine Dion, Michael Jackson, Blondie, Eric Clapton, Joe Cocker, Cyndi Lauper, Bill Laswell and Herbie Hancock, Bernard Edwards and Tony Thompson, Meat Loaf, Robert Palmer, Missing Persons, Iggy Pop, Iron Maiden, Billy Joel, and the Sisters of Mercy among others.

== Early life ==
Born in Washington D.C., he grew up in Old Greenwich, Connecticut. Being the son of a professional trumpet player, he took the instrument up for himself during elementary school and continued with it at the Berklee College of Music and the Manhattan School of Music. Although he also had arranging and composition lessons by trumpet legend Maury Deutsch, he would choose to specialize in keyboards instead. After leaving college he participated in a Connecticut-based jazz fusion band called "Flying Island" and later on he moved back to New York to find a place into the R&B group Change (from 1982 to 1984).

== Career ==
=== 1980s ===
In 1983, and after having worked with Nona Hendryx, he met avant-garde bassist and record producer Bill Laswell, who was set to produce Herbie Hancock's Future Shock (the first part of the latter's "techno-funk" trilogy). The tour in support of that album found Bova on Hancock's live band, as he was proficient in the ARP Chroma (a much-heard instrument on Future Shock). He would work with him for the next five years, contributing to the recordings of the final part of the trilogy (Perfect Machine), while he also programmed and composed tracks for several of the soundtracks Hancock has been working on, including that of the Sean Penn film Colours. Soon after, he started working on numerous projects that were held in the Power Station and eventually obtained a room of his own there (courtesy of the studio's owners Tony Bongiovi and Bob Walters). In 1987, fellow Power Station "resident", bassist Bernard Edwards (of Chic), formed the rock-funk supergroup Distance, with Bova on keyboards, Tony Thompson (also of Chic) on drums, future Bad Company member Robert Hart on lead vocals and Eddie Martinez on guitars. They released only one album, Under the One Sky (1989) on Reprise Records, which failed to chart.

=== 1990s ===
During the 1990s, Bova achieved great commercial success as a producer of Celine Dion's Grammy Award-winning album Falling into You. He also played Hammond organ and synthesizers with Meat Loaf on Bat Out of Hell II: Back into Hell. "Back Into Hell", an instrumental track on Bat Out of Hell II, was arranged and performed entirely by him, while "Fiesta De Las Almas Perdidas", a short song also written by Bova, was featured on Meat Loaf's 1995 album Welcome to the Neighborhood.

== Partial discography ==
Partial Jeff Bova's discography, as a keyboardist, composer, arranger and producer:

- Visions – Bunky Green (Vanguard, 1978)
- Riptide - Robert Palmer, 1985
- Starpeace - Yoko Ono, 1985
- True Colors - Cyndi Lauper, 1986
- Eat 'Em and Smile - David Lee Roth, 1986
- The Bridge - Billy Joel, 1986
- Color in Your Life - Missing Persons, 1986
- Hearts In Motion - Air Supply, 1986
- Floodland - The Sisters of Mercy, 1987
- Perfect Machine - Herbie Hancock, 1988
- Instinct - Iggy Pop, 1988
- Ooh Yeah! - Hall & Oates, 1988
- Original Sin - Pandora's Box, 1989
- A Night to Remember - Cyndi Lauper, 1989
- Jody Watley - Jody Watley, 1989
- Under the One Sky - Distance, 1989
- Journeyman - Eric Clapton, 1989
- Stranger in This Town - Richie Sambora, 1991
- Bat Out of Hell II: Back into Hell - Meat Loaf, 1993
- Blink of an Eye - Michael McDonald, 1993
- HIStory - Michael Jackson, 1995
- Welcome to the Neighborhood - Meat Loaf, 1995
- Falling into You - Celine Dion, 1996
- Stories Told & Untold - Bad Company, 1996
- In Deep - Tina Arena, 1997
- Brave New World - Iron Maiden, 2000
- Talk to Me - Joe McIntyre, 2006
- Bag of Bones - Europe, 2012
- Opus - Jane Badler, 2014
- The Book of Souls - Iron Maiden, 2015
- Gracia - Mari Hamada, 2018
- Soar - Mari Hamada, 2023

== Notes ==
1. "Jeff Bova Website"
2. "Mix" interview
