= Wildlife (Mott the Hoople album) =

Studio album by Mott the Hoople
- Released: 19 March 1971
- Recorded: November–December 1970
- Studio: Island, London
- Genre: Country rock
- Length: 40:05
- Label: Island (UK), Atlantic (US)
- Producer: Mott the Hoople (tracks 1, 2, 4, 6–8); Guy Stevens (track 3); Mott the Hoople/Guy Stevens (tracks 5 and 9)

Mott the Hoople chronology
Mad Shadows (1970)	Wildlife (1971)	Brain Capers (1971)

Wildlife is the third album by the British band Mott the Hoople.

The album was originally released in 1971; in the UK by Island Records (catalogue number ILPS 9144) and in the US by Atlantic Records (cat. no. SD 8284). It was subsequently re-released by Angel Air in 2003 SJPCD159.

It reached No. 44 in the UK Albums Chart in April 1971.

== Recording ==
The album was recorded in November and December 1970 at Island Studios in London. It was produced by Guy Stevens and Mott the Hoople. The engineers were Andy Johns, Brian Humphries, and Phill Brown.

== Release ==
The album was released on vinyl in 1971; in the UK by Island Records and in the US by Atlantic Records. It was subsequently re-released on CD by Angel Air in 2003. It was the band's third album since their debut, Mott the Hoople, in 1969.

== Reception ==
Ben Edmonds, reviewing for Rolling Stone in June 1971, felt that the band and singer Ian Hunter had moved on from the Bob Dylan comparisons of the first two albums, and had added a country music influence, to produce an album with "more than enough solid music" to warrant some attention in America.

The album reached No. 44 in the UK Albums Chart in April 1971.

== Legacy ==
Stephen Thomas Erlewine of AllMusic gave the album four stars out of five and stated:

Since they had little success and seemed to be going off the tracks, Mott the Hoople was encouraged to produce their third album with anyone that wasn't Guy Stevens. Eventually, they chose themselves, creating a record that is bright and punchy, standing in direct contrast to Mad Shadows' enveloping fog. They wound up with Wildlife, a record that still seems a little transitional, yet is considerably more confident, unified, and enjoyable.

== Track listing ==
Side one
No.	Title	Writer(s)	Lead vocals	Length
1.	"Whisky Women"	Mick Ralphs	Ralphs	3:34
2.	"Angel of Eighth Avenue"	Ian Hunter	Hunter	4:25
3.	"Wrong Side of the River"	Ralphs	Ralphs	5:14
4.	"Waterlow"	Hunter	Hunter	3:00
5.	"Lay Down"	Melanie Safka	Hunter	4:02

Side two
No.	Title	Writer(s)	Lead vocals	Length
6.	"It Must Be Love"	Ralphs	Ralphs	2:15
7.	"Original Mixed-Up Kid"	Hunter	Hunter	3:35
8.	"Home Is Where I Want to Be"	Ralphs	Ralphs	4:07
9.	"Keep a Knockin'" (live at Fairfield Halls, Croydon, 13 September 1970)	Richard Penniman	Hunter	9:50*

- *This track is a rock and roll medley that, in addition to "Keep a Knockin'", includes snippets of "I Got a Woman" (by Ray Charles), "What'd I Say" (Charles) and "Whole Lotta Shakin' Goin' On" (Jerry Lee Lewis). On the recording, singer Ian Hunter incorrectly introduces "What'd I Say" as being written by Jerry Lee Lewis.

2003 CD bonus tracks

10. "It'll Be Me" (Jack Clement) – 2.58
11. "Long Red" (Leslie West, Felix Pappalardi, John Ventura, Norman Landsberg) – 3.47

2018 CD bonus track

In 2018, as part of a boxed set of Island era material, "Whiskey Women" was issued under its original title of "Brain Haulage". This is an unedited take, with the guitar power-chords mixed higher. It's heavier, and closer to the live versions of the song.

== Personnel ==
Mott the Hoople

- Ian Hunter – vocals, piano
- Mick Ralphs – guitar, vocals
- Verden Allen – organ
- Pete "Overend" Watts – bass
- Dale "Buffin" Griffin – drums

Additional personnel

- Jerry Hogan – steel guitar on "It Must Be Love" and "Original Mixed-Up Kid"
- Jess Roden – background chorus on "Lay Down"
- Stan Tippins – background chorus on "Lay Down"
- Michael Gray – string arrangements and conductor on "Waterlow"
- Jim Archer – violin on "Angel of Eighth Avenue"

Technical

- Andy Johns, Brian Humphries, Phill Brown – engineers
- Brian Cooke – photography

== Charts ==
Chart (1971)	Peak position
UK Albums (OCC)	44
