= Company of Strangers (Bad Company album) =

1995 studio album by Bad Company

Studio album by Bad Company
- Released: June 1995
- Recorded: 1994–1995
- Genre: Blues rock
- Length: 50:52
- Label: East West
- Producer: Bad Company

Bad Company chronology
What You Hear Is What You Get: The Best of Bad Company (1993)	Company of Strangers (1995)	Stories Told & Untold (1996)

Professional ratings
Review scores
Source	Rating
AllMusic	2/5 stars
Entertainment Weekly	B

Company of Strangers is the eleventh studio album by the English blues rock band Bad Company, and their first with lead singer Robert Hart (in place of Brian Howe who had replaced Paul Rodgers in 1986). The album was released in June 1995, and was their last album of original material.

== Track listing ==
No.	Title	Writer(s)	Length
1.	"Company of Strangers"	Robert Hart, Simon Kirke	5:14
2.	"Clearwater Highway"	Robert Hart, Dave Colwell, Mick Lister	3:25
3.	"Judas My Brother"	Robert Hart	4:45
4.	"Little Martha"	Dave Colwell, Mick Lister, Kim Carnes, Terry Finley	2:57
5.	"Gimme Gimme"	Mick Ralphs	3:32
6.	"Where I Belong"	Dave Colwell, Mick Lister	4:02
7.	"Down Down Down"	Mick Ralphs	3:19
8.	"Abandoned and Alone"	Dave Colwell, Mick Lister	5:37
9.	"Down and Dirty"	Mick Ralphs, Dave Colwell	4:51
10.	"Pretty Woman"	Robert Hart, Mick Ralphs, Simon Kirke, Dave Colwell, Rick Wills	3:32
11.	"You're the Only Reason"	Mick Ralphs	3:45
12.	"Dance with the Devil"	Simon Kirke	3:04
13.	"Loving You Out Loud"	Simon Kirke	2:49

== Personnel ==
Bad Company

- Robert Hart − vocals
- Mick Ralphs − guitars
- Dave Colwell − guitars
- Rick Wills − bass
- Simon Kirke − drums

with:

- Mel Collins − saxophone
- Jody Linscott – percussion
- Strings arranged and conducted by Michael Kamen

== Charts ==
Chart (1995)	Peak position
US Billboard 200	159
