= Circus Bar =

Studio album by Brian Howe
- Released: February 26, 2010
- Genre: Rock
- Length: 51.1 minutes
- Label: Frontiers Records,
- Producer: Brooks Paschal

Brian Howe chronology
Tangled In Blue (2003)	Circus Bar (2010)

Circus Bar is the second solo and final studio album by ex-Bad Company singer Brian Howe. Produced by Brooks Paschal and mixed by Rafe McKenna, the album includes two newly recorded remakes of the Bad Company hits "How About That" and "Holy Water".

Some friends helped Brian in shaping up Circus Bar: Wayne Nelson of Little River Band dropped by the studio for a few days and also Pat Travers popped in and played guitar on "My Town".

== Track listing ==
1. I'm Back
2. Life's Mystery
3. There's This Girl
4. Could Have Been You
5. Surrounded
6. Flying
7. How It Could Have Been
8. My Town
9. How 'Bout That (new version)
10. Feels Like I'm Coming Home
11. If You Want Trouble
12. Feelings
13. Holy Water (new version)
14. Little George Street

== Personnel ==
- Brian Howe- lead vocals
- Brooks Paschal, Dean Aicher, James Paul Wisner, Tyson Shipman- guitar
- Pat Travers- electric guitar (“My Town”)
- Brooks Paschal, Miguel Gonzalez, Wayne Nelson- bass guitar
- Matt Brown- drums
- Luke Davids- keyboards
