= Nightstand (disambiguation) =

A nightstand is a small bedside table.

Nightstand or Night stand may also refer to:

- Nightstand, a 2018 album by Tancred
- Night Stand with Dick Dietrick, a 1990s American television comedy show
- "Nightstand", a song by K. Michelle from her 2016 album More Issues Than Vogue

== See also ==
- One-night stand (disambiguation)
