= For One Night Only =

One Night Only may refer to:

- For One Night Only (TV series), an Irish light entertainment show hosted by Gay Byrne
- For One Night Only (album), a Terrorvision album

== See also ==
- One Night Only (disambiguation)
- One Night (disambiguation)
