= No Smoke Without a Fire =

Single by Bad Company

from the album Dangerous Age
- B-side: "Love Attack"
- Released: 1989
- Genre: Rock
- Length: 4:33
- Label: Atlantic
- Songwriter(s): Brian Howe, Terry Thomas
- Producer(s): Bad Company

Bad Company singles chronology
"Shake It Up" (1988)	"No Smoke Without a Fire" (1989)	"Holy Water" (1990)

"No Smoke Without a Fire" is a song by English rock group Bad Company, released as the second single from their eighth studio album Dangerous Age.

Despite failing to match the success of the album's first single, "Shake It Up", "No Smoke Without a Fire" was played substantially with "Shake It Up" on rock radio stations at the time of its release, eventually reaching a peak of #4 on the Billboard Mainstream Rock Tracks chart.

Cash Box called it "an auspicious come-back effort for Bad Company," saying that "a boulder-heavy signature track lumbers away under an inspired vocal effort."

== Track listing ==
=== 7" single ===
1. "No Smoke Without a Fire" - 4:33
2. "Love Attack" - 3:51

=== 12" single ===
1. "No Smoke Without a Fire" (LP version) - 4:33
2. "No Smoke Without a Fire" - 4:33

=== 12" vinyl single (Germany) ===
1. "No Smoke Without a Fire" (Remix) - 6:01
2. "No Smoke Without a Fire" (LP version) - 4:33
3. "Love Attack" (LP version) - 3:55

== Charts ==
Chart (1988)	Peak position
U.S. Billboard Mainstream Rock Tracks	4
