= Mad Shadows =

Mad Shadows may refer to:

- Mad Shadows (album), an album by English rock band Mott the Hoople
- Mad Shadows (novel), the English title of a novel by Canadian author Marie-Claire Blais
