= Guy Stevens =

Music industry figure

Background information
- Born: Guy Stevens; 13 April 1943; East Dulwich, London, England
- Died: 29 August 1981 (aged 38) Forest Hill, South London, England
- Occupations: Producer; manager; DJ
- Years active: 1963–1981

Guy Stevens (13 April 1943 – 28 August 1981) was a British music industry figure whose roles included DJ, record producer and band manager. He was influential in promoting R&B music in Britain in the 1960s, gave the rock bands Procol Harum and Mott the Hoople their distinctive names and co-produced The Clash's album London Calling.

== Early life and career ==
Stevens was born in East Dulwich, London. His father Edgar died when he was six, and at the age of 11 he was enrolled at Woolverstone Hall boarding school near Ipswich. After being expelled for rebelliousness, he started work with his brother in the insurance industry, at the same time starting a record collection of blues and R&B records, imported from the U.S. He married Diane Cox in 1965 and had a son the following year.

In 1963, he started a weekly "R&B Disc Night" at the Scene Club in Soho, run by Ronan O'Rahilly, at which Stevens often played obscure Stax, Chess and Motown records, attracting a growing number of mod clubgoers and musicians, including members of The Who, The Small Faces, The Yardbirds, The Rolling Stones and The Beatles. Stevens compiled and annotated reissues and compilations of American records, particularly for EMI. He wrote the first UK press profiles of such musicians as Muddy Waters and Howlin' Wolf in the Record Mirror.

== Sue and Island Records ==
Stevens was approached by record company executive Chris Blackwell in 1964 to run the Sue record label in the UK, as an offshoot of Island Records. He took responsibility for releasing a string of successful R&B singles on Sue in the UK, including records by Ike and Tina Turner, Jimmy McGriff, Elmore James, Wilbert Harrison, Donnie Elbert, and Inez and Charlie Foxx. He also compiled and annotated The Sue Story compilation LPs. Stevens used the Sue label to put out obscure American singles not only from the U.S. Sue group of labels, but from many small independent record companies, and some of the bigger ones. It became widely influential. Stevens was also president of the Chuck Berry Appreciation Society, and had a say in the UK releases that Pye International put out by Berry, Bo Diddley and others on the Chess and Checker labels. It was Guy Stevens who brought Berry to the UK for his first tour after paying his bail to get him out of jail for offences under the Mann Act.

He broke into record production at Blackwell's suggestion in 1965, firstly on a single by Alex Harvey and then producing live albums by Larry Williams and Lee Dorsey. The following year, he was appointed head of A&R at Island Records. His first signing to the label was Birmingham band The V.I.P.s, who soon changed their name to Art. Stevens produced their early recordings, before they added keyboardist Gary Wright to become Spooky Tooth. Stevens also managed and produced Hapshash and the Coloured Coat, an artistic and musical collaboration between the band Art and designers Michael English and Nigel Waymouth, which led to the album Featuring the Human Host and the Heavy Metal Kids.

Stevens also introduced lyricist Keith Reid to keyboardist Gary Brooker of The Paramounts. He encouraged them to write together, and reportedly commented to Reid at a party that a friend had turned "a whiter shade of pale". The resulting song was recorded by Brooker's newly formed band, named Procol Harum by Stevens, and – though turned down by Blackwell at Island – went on to become one of the defining songs of the era.

In 1967, Stevens was imprisoned for several months for drug offences, during which time his record collection was stolen, leading to a breakdown. However, on his release he returned to Island Records, and produced albums by Free, Mighty Baby, and Heavy Jelly.

=== Mott the Hoople ===
While working for Island, Stevens was fundamental in the formation of Mott the Hoople. The band was originally called "Silence," with the line-up of Stan Tippins on vocals, Mick Ralphs on lead guitar, Verden Allen on keyboards, Overend Watts on bass, and Dale Griffin on drums. Envisioning a band with a sound that would be a combination of The Rolling Stones and Bob Dylan, Stevens recruited and mentored Ian Hunter as lead singer, and demoted Stan Tippins to road manager. Stevens also named the band after the Willard Manus novel, which he had read while in prison.

Stevens served as the Mott's manager, and produced their eponymous 1969 debut album and its 1970 follow-up, Mad Shadows (1970). After Mad Shadows met with poor sales and negative reviews, Mott dispensed with Stevens' services and produced their third album, Wildlife (1971), by themselves. After that album's commercial failure, Mott re-recruited Stevens to produce the Brain Capers album (1971). On the verge of splitting up in 1972, Mott again dropped Stevens, and signed to Tony DeFries' company MainMan. Mott's fifth album, All the Young Dudes, was produced by David Bowie.

== Later activities ==
By the mid-1970s, Stevens' activities had become increasingly erratic as a result of his chronic alcoholism.

=== The Clash ===
In 1976 Stevens was present, although not clearly as a producer, on a demo session which The Clash undertook before they were signed. Mick Jones recalled that:

At the session, Guy was there for a while and then he got upset about something. I think the other guys, the sound engineer Vic Smith and Chris Perry from Polydor, just wanted to record a demonstration session and take it to A&R and get the band signed. They didn't know how to deal with Guy, because everything with Guy was like a major number.

In 1979, the band recruited Stevens to produce their album London Calling. The band themselves have always held up Stevens' input as a major factor in the album's popularity and quality. The Clash involved Stevens because they recognized the influential role he had played in the British beat and blues booms of the 1960s. The Who, The Small Faces, The Rolling Stones and many others used Stevens' knowledge of the American R&B and soul scene as a source for their own repertoire, having heard of him through his deejaying at the New Scene Club. Stevens' involvement with the production of London Calling is explored extensively in Marcus Gray's book Route 19 Revisited: The Clash and the Making of London Calling (2012).

== Death and legacy ==
Stevens was last seen alive at his home in South-east London on 29 August 1981. His body was found on 31 August. His death was the result of an overdose on the prescription drugs he was taking to reduce his alcohol dependency.

Later that year the Clash wrote a song in his honour: "Midnight to Stevens". It was eventually released as the B-side of a 12" Clash single in the summer of 1982. It was later re-released in 1991 when it appeared on disc three of the compilation Clash on Broadway.

Free recorded "Guy Stevens Blues" as a tribute although the track remained unissued until 2001.

Stevens' involvement in Mott the Hoople's early career was covered in the 2011 documentary, The Ballad of Mott the Hoople. Stevens also produced Free's debut album Tons of Sobs, the eponymous debut album of Mighty Baby, and the debut of Art (Spooky Tooth), Supernatural Fairy Tales.

A poem in tribute to Stevens was included by Ian Hunter on the lyric sheet of his 1983 CBS album All of the Good Ones Are Taken, which concluded: "I remember the guy with the electric hair at that first rehearsal standing there. You gave your heart – you gave your soul. God bless you, Guy – Rock n Roll!"

In assessing himself, Stevens stated, "There are only two Phil Spectors in the world... and I'm one of them!"
