= The Jones Gang =

English rock band

- Origin: London, England, UK
- Genre: Rock
- Years active: 2001–present
- Label: AAO Music
- Members: Kenney Jones; Robert Hart; Johnson Jay; Jim Stapley; Mark Read; Pat Davey; Sam Tanner
- Past members: Dave Colwell; Rick Wills

The Jones Gang are an English rock band, formed in London in 2001 by the English drummer and ex-Small Faces and The Who member Kenney Jones, plus ex-Foreigner member Rick Wills and British vocalist ex-Bad Company member Robert Hart.

== Members ==
=== Main lineups ===
- Kenney Jones – drums (2001–present)
- Robert Hart – lead vocals (2001–present)
- Jim Stapley – vocals (2013–present)
- Mark Read – vocals (2014–present)
- Pat Davey – bass guitar (2017–present)
- Johnson Jay – lead guitar (2014–present)
- Sam Tanner – keys/vocals (2016–present)

=== Former members ===
- Rick Wills – bass guitar (2001–2017)
- Dave "Bucket" Colwell – lead guitar (2001–2014)

== Discography ==
- Any Day Now (2005)
