= Fame and Fortune =

1986 studio album by Bad Company

Studio album by Bad Company
- Released: October 1986
- Genres: Hard rock; arena rock
- Length: 39:07
- Label: Atlantic
- Producer: Keith Olsen

Bad Company chronology
| 10 from 6 (1985) | Fame and Fortune (1986) | Dangerous Age (1988) |

Singles from Fame and Fortune
- 1. "This Love" Released: October 1986; 2. "That Girl" Released: February 1987 (US); 3. "Fame and Fortune" Released: February 1987 (UK)

Professional ratings
Review scores
| Source | Rating |
|---|---|
| AllMusic | 2.5/5 stars |
| The Encyclopedia of Popular Music | 2/5 stars |
| MusicHound Rock: The Essential Album Guide | 1.5/5 stars |
| The Rolling Stone Album Guide | 2/5 stars |

Fame and Fortune is the seventh studio album by British rock band Bad Company, released in 1986. It was the first album released by the reformed group, featuring original members Mick Ralphs (guitar) and Simon Kirke (drums), with the addition of new frontman Brian Howe (formerly of Ted Nugent's band) substituting for original singer Paul Rodgers. Though original bassist Boz Burrell received credit, the liner notes reveal that session player Steve Price played on the album.

The album peaked at No. 106 on the Billboard 200.

== Production ==
The album was produced by Foreigner producer Keith Olsen. Foreigner's Mick Jones served as executive producer and co-writer of two tracks.

== Critical reception ==
The Morning Call deemed the album a "high-tech clunker".

== Track listing ==
| No. | Title | Writer(s) | Length |
|---|---|---|---|
| 1. | "Burning Up" | Mick Ralphs, Mick Jones | 4:02 |
| 2. | "This Love" | Brian Howe, Andy Fretwell | 4:21 |
| 3. | "Fame and Fortune" | Mick Ralphs | 3:35 |
| 4. | "That Girl" | Brian Howe, Mick Ralphs | 4:01 |
| 5. | "Tell It Like It Is" | Brian Howe, Mick Ralphs | 3:52 |
| 6. | "Long Walk" | Brian Howe, Gregg Dechert | 3:34 |
| 7. | "Hold on My Heart" | Brian Howe, Gregg Dechert, Mick Jones | 4:25 |
| 8. | "Valerie" | Brian Howe, Mick Ralphs | 3:29 |
| 9. | "When We Made Love" | Brian Howe, Simon Kirke, John Bettis | 4:18 |
| 10. | "If I'm Sleeping" | Brian Howe, Mick Ralphs, Simon Kirke, Gregg Dechert | 3:30 |

== Personnel ==
=== Bad Company ===
- Mick Ralphs
- Simon Kirke
- Brian Howe

with:

- Gregg Dechert – keyboards
- Steven Price – bass

=== Production ===
- Executive Producer – Mick Jones
- Engineered by – Stuart Epps, Brian Foraker, Jay Healy
- Mixed by – Frank Filipetti with Mick Jones
- Recorded at The Sol, Berkshire
- Mixed at Goodnight L. A. and The Hit Factory New York
- Mastered at Sterling Sound New York by Ted Jensen
- Sid Pryce – band technician
- Produced by Keith Olsen

== Charts ==
| Chart (1986) | Peak position |
|---|---|
| US Billboard 200 | 106 |
