= One Night =

One Night or 1 Night may refer to:

== Film ==
- One Night (1931 film), a Swedish film directed by Gustaf Molander
- One Night (2002 film), a film produced by Winchester Films
- One Night (2005 film), an Iranian film directed by Niki Karimi
- One Night (2007 film), a film featuring Christian Campbell and Billy Lush
- One Night (2009 film), a Canadian short film directed by Shelagh Carter
- One Night (2010 film), a film featuring Olivier Gruner
- One Night (2012 film), a Belgian-French film directed by Lucas Belvaux
- 1 Night (film), a 2016 American film directed by Minhal Baig
- Ek Raat (lit. 'One Night'), a 1942 Indian Hindi-language film

== Music ==
=== Albums ===
- One Night (Greg Brown album), 1983
- One Night (J. C. Jones album), 1998
- One Night, by ELO Part II, 1996
- One Night, by Arlo Guthrie, 1978

=== Songs ===
- "One Night" (Lil Yachty song), 2015
- "One Night" (MK and Sonny Fodera song), 2019
- "One Night" (Smiley Lewis song), 1956, later covered by Elvis Presley
- "One Night" (WTS song), 2016
- "One Night", by Bad Company from Dangerous Age, 1988
- "One Night", by the Corrs from In Blue, 2000
- "One Night", by Griff, 2021
- "One Night", by Jay Sean from Me Against Myself, 2004
- "One Night", by Joan Armatrading from Secret Secrets, 1985
- "One Night", by Matthew Koma, 2013
- "One Night", by MK, 2019
- "One Night", by Picture This, 2019
- "One Night", by Shimica Wong, 2010
- "One Night", by Sia from Reasonable Woman, 2024
- "One Night", by Travis from The Boy with No Name, 2007
- "1 Night", by Mura Masa from Mura Masa, 2017
- "1Night", by Stargate, 2018
- "#1Nite (One Night)", by Cobra Starship from Night Shades, 2011

== Television ==
- One Night (British TV series), a 2012 drama series
- One Night (Norwegian TV series), a 2018 drama series
- One Night (Australian TV series), a 2023 drama series
- One Night (Canadian TV series), a 2023 comedy/drama series
- "One Night" (Cold Case), an episode
- "One Night" (Sanctuary), an episode

== Games ==
- One Night, a variant of Mafia (party game) from gamemaker Bézier Games
- One Night Trilogy, a series of indie survival horror games

== See also ==
- One Night Only (disambiguation)
- One-night stand (disambiguation)
