= All the Young Dudes (album) =

Studio album by Mott the Hoople
- Released: 8 September 1972
- Recorded: May–July 1972
- Studio: Olympic (London); Trident (London)
- Genre: Glam rock, hard rock
- Length: 40:47
- Label: CBS (UK), Columbia (US)
- Producer: David Bowie

Mott the Hoople chronology
Brain Capers (1971)	All the Young Dudes (1972)	Rock and Roll Queen (1972)

Singles from All the Young Dudes
- 1. "All the Young Dudes" Released: July 1972; 2. "One of the Boys" Released: January 1973 (US); 3. "Sweet Jane" Released: March 1973 (US)

Professional ratings
Review scores
Source	Rating
AllMusic	5/5 stars
Christgau's Record Guide	A−
Pitchfork	7.8/10
Rolling Stone	favourable

All the Young Dudes is the fifth studio album by the English rock band Mott the Hoople, released in 1972. It was their initial album for the CBS Records label (Columbia Records in the United States and Canada), after three years with Island Records in the UK and Atlantic Records in the United States and Canada.

== Background and reception ==
All the Young Dudes was a turning point for the then-struggling British band. Mott the Hoople were on the verge of breaking up when David Bowie stepped in and gave them the song "All the Young Dudes". Bowie and Mick Ronson also produced the album with tracks arranged by Ronson, which took Mott "from potential has-beens to avatars of the glam rock movement". A remastered and expanded version was released by Sony BMG on the Columbia Legacy label in the United Kingdom and the United States on 21 February 2006.

The title track, "All the Young Dudes", was released as a single prior to the album and charted worldwide, becoming the "ultimate '70s glitterkid anthem". "Sweet Jane", a cover of the Velvet Underground song from their 1970 album Loaded, was issued as a single in Canada, the Netherlands, Portugal, Spain and the United States, though not in their home market of the UK. "One of the Boys", originally the B-side of "All the Young Dudes", was also released in North America and Continental Europe.

In 2003, the album was ranked No. 491 on Rolling Stone magazine's list of The 500 Greatest Albums of All Time. In 2012's revised list, the magazine ranked it at No. 484, saying, "Mott would sound more soulful but never more sexy or glittery."

"Ready for Love" was reworked by Mick Ralphs's subsequent band Bad Company on their self-titled debut. "Soft Ground" was written by organist Verden Allen and, other than the 2013 reunion album, the only occasion when he recorded lead vocal with Mott the Hoople.

== Recording ownership controversy ==
Speculation has persisted over the years that, although All the Young Dudes was released by CBS/Columbia Records, Mott the Hoople may have recorded part or all of the album while still under contract to their original label, Island Records – a situation that, if proven true, might give Island ownership rights to the recordings. Fuel was added to this speculation in 2006 with the re-release of All the Young Dudes in remastered form, including several bonus tracks. Production on one of the bonus tracks, "Black Scorpio" (an early version of "Momma's Little Jewel"), is co-credited to Island staff producer/A&R executive Muff Winwood, possibly suggesting that work on at least that track was begun while Mott were still signed to Island.

Public comments from the band regarding this matter have been inconsistent. In an extended August 1980 interview with Trouser Press magazine, Ian Hunter stated that Mott had completed All the Young Dudes prior to the band's leaving Island Records, and that Island's head Chris Blackwell was unaware the band had a new album ready for release when dissolving their relationship. However, when interviewed about the situation for Chris Hall's and Mike Kerry's 2011 documentary Ballad of Mott the Hoople, Hunter laughed, saying "I can’t really discuss it ... there's a blank there as far as I’m concerned – all of a sudden we’re on Columbia Records, and 'Dudes' was the first single."

== Track listing ==
=== Original 1972 release ===
==== Side one ====
1. "Sweet Jane" (Lou Reed) – 4:21
2. "Momma's Little Jewel" (Ian Hunter, Peter Watts) – 4:26
3. "All the Young Dudes" (David Bowie) – 3:32
4. "Sucker" (Hunter, Mick Ralphs, Watts) – 5:03
5. "Jerkin' Crocus" (Hunter) – 4:00

==== Side two ====
1. "One of the Boys" (Hunter, Ralphs) – 6:46
2. "Soft Ground" (Verden Allen) – 3:17
3. "Ready for Love/After Lights" (Ralphs) – 6:47
4. "Sea Diver" (Hunter) – 2:53

=== Bonus tracks (2006 CD reissue) ===
1. "One of the Boys" (Demo version) (Hunter, Ralphs) – 4:18 Produced by Mott the Hoople
2. "Black Scorpio" (Demo version of "Momma's Little Jewel") (Hunter, Watts) – 3:35 Produced by Mott the Hoople and Muff Winwood
3. "Ride on the Sun" (Demo version of "Sea Diver") (Hunter) – 3:36 Produced by Mott the Hoople
4. "One of the Boys" (UK single version) (Hunter, Ralphs) – 4:21 Produced by Mott the Hoople
5. "All the Young Dudes" (David Bowie; Ian Hunter – vocal) (Bowie) – 4:25
6. "Sucker" (Hunter, Ralph, Watts) – 6:27 Live 1973 at the Hammersmith Odeon; produced by Dale "Buffin" Griffin
7. "Sweet Jane" (Reed) – 5:00 Live 1973 at the Hammersmith Odeon; produced by Dale "Buffin" Griffin

== Personnel ==
=== Mott the Hoople ===
- Ian Hunter – lead vocals, piano
- Mick Ralphs – guitar, backing vocals, lead vocals on "Ready For Love / After Lights"
- Pete Overend Watts – bass
- Dale "Buffin" Griffin – drums
- Verden Allen – organ, backing vocals, lead vocals on "Soft Ground"

=== Additional personnel ===
- Ariel Bender – guitar, vocals on bonus tracks 6, 7
- Mick Bolton – organ on bonus track 7
- David Bowie – saxophones, backing vocals, vocals on bonus track 5
- Morgan Fisher – organ, Mellotron on bonus track 3; piano, synthesizer, vocals on bonus tracks 6, 7
- Ray Majors – slide guitar on bonus track 2
- Mick Ronson – strings, brass, arrangement on "Sea Diver"
- Buddy Bauerle – pan flute
- Mike Walls – Hammond B3 organ
- Jeff Hanover – vibraslap

=== Technical personnel ===
- David Bowie – producer
- David Hentschel, Keith Harwood, Ted Sharp – engineer
- George Underwood – cover art, colour retouching
- Mick Rock – sleeve concept, art direction, photography

== Charts ==
Chart (1972–73)	Peak position
Australian Albums (Kent Music Report)	61
UK Albums (OCC)	21
US Billboard 200	89
