= Mott the Hoople (album) =

Studio album by Mott the Hoople
- Released: November 1969
- Recorded: May–July 1969
- Studio: Morgan (London)
- Genre: Hard rock
- Length: 38:26
- Labels: Island (UK), Atlantic (US)
- Producer: Guy Stevens

Mott the Hoople chronology
Mott the Hoople (1969)	Mad Shadows (1970)

Singles from Mott the Hoople
- 1. "Rock and Roll Queen" Released: October 1969

Professional ratings
Review scores
Source	Rating
Allmusic	4/5 stars
Christgau's Record Guide	C+
Entertainment Weekly	A

Mott the Hoople is the debut studio album by the band of the same name. It was produced by Guy Stevens and released in 1969 by Island Records in the UK (ILPS 9108), and in 1970 by Atlantic Records in the US (SD 8258). It was re-issued by Angel Air in 2003 (SJPCD157).

== Background ==
Stevens, the group's initial mentor and guide, wanted to create an album that would suggest Bob Dylan singing with the Rolling Stones. This was partially achieved, with the album including several Dylanesque cover versions along with aggressive rock originals. Years later, vocalist Ian Hunter - who had only just joined the band prior to Mott the Hoople's recording and had yet to play live with them - would insinuate, in an August 1980 Trouser Press magazine interview, that the Stones' 1971 track "Bitch" bore more than a passing resemblance to this album's "Rock and Roll Queen." (Both songs are in the key of A, and use the pentatonic scale.)

An instrumental version of The Kinks' "You Really Got Me" introduces the album, though a vocal version was recorded and is available on Mott's compilation release Two Miles From Heaven. Doug Sahm's "At the Crossroads" (originally recorded by Sahm's Sir Douglas Quintet in 1968) and Sonny Bono's "Laugh at Me" (originally issued by Sonny & Cher on their second full-length album in 1966, but without vocals from Cher) are suitably reminiscent of Bob Dylan, as is Hunter's "Backsliding Fearlessly."

Initial copies of the UK album were wrongly pressed with the song "The Road to Birmingham," (the B-side of their debut single in the UK) at the end of side one, with "Backsliding Fearlessly" replacing "Rock and Roll Queen" at the start of side two.

The album's cover is a colorized reproduction of M. C. Escher's lithograph "Reptiles." In an interesting coincidence considering Guy Stevens' desire for Mott to sound like the Rolling Stones, in early 1969 Mick Jagger had approached Escher wanting to commission a painting for the cover of the Stones' upcoming album Let It Bleed; Escher declined the request.

== Critical reception ==
Stephen Thomas Erlewine of AllMusic, gives the album four stars out of five and states:

Up to this point, Mott the Hoople is wildly imaginative and invigorating, and that's enough to make this a fine debut, even if it falls off the tracks during the second side. The first side and those two originals reveal a band whose rowdy power is matched by sly humor, clever twists, and fierce intelligence -- all qualities they built a career on, and this blueprint still stands the test of time.

Robert Christgau however rates the album "C+" and states:

Despite the hype, these guys strike me as an ordinary hard rock combo.

Record World called the single "Rock and Roll Queen" a "heavyweight rocker with nifty lyric."

== Track listing ==
=== Side one ===
1. "You Really Got Me" (Ray Davies) – 2:55
2. "At the Crossroads" (Doug Sahm) – 5:33
3. "Laugh At Me" (Sonny Bono) – 6:32
4. "Backsliding Fearlessly" (Ian Hunter) – 3:47

=== Side two ===
1. "Rock and Roll Queen" (Mick Ralphs) – 5:10
2. "Rabbit Foot and Toby Time" (Ralphs) – 2:04
3. "Half Moon Bay" (Ralphs, Hunter) – 10:38
4. "Wrath and Wroll" (Guy Stevens) – 1:49

=== 2003 CD bonus tracks ===
9. "Ohio" (Neil Young) – 4:26
10. "Find Your Way" (Ralphs) – 3:30

== Personnel ==
=== Mott the Hoople ===
- Ian Hunter – lead vocals, piano
- Mick Ralphs – lead guitar, vocals
- Pete "Overend" Watts – bass
- Dale "Buffin" Griffin – drums
- Verden Allen – organ

=== Technical ===
- Guy Stevens – producer
- Andy Johns – engineer
- M. C. Escher – front cover drawing

== Charts ==
Chart (1970)	Peak position
UK Albums (Official Charts)	66
US Billboard 200	185
