= Stories Told & Untold =

1996 album by Bad Company

Studio album by Bad Company
- Released: 15 October 1996
- Genre: Hard rock
- Length: 58:22
- Label: East West
- Producer: Bad Company

Bad Company chronology
Company of Strangers (1995)	Stories Told & Untold (1996)	The 'Original' Bad Co. Anthology (1999)

Professional ratings
Review scores
Source	Rating
AllMusic	2/5 stars

Stories Told & Untold is the twelfth and final studio album by the English band Bad Company. The album was released on 15 October 1996, through East West. This album features newly arranged re-recordings of Bad Company's greatest hits in a more Americana inspired style, along with new songs. Despite not recording any further albums, the band would continue to tour (with original lead vocalist Paul Rodgers eventually returning) until 2019.

== Track listing ==
No.	Title	Writer(s)	Length
1.	"One on One"	Robert Hart, Dave Colwell	4:01
2.	"Oh, Atlanta"	Mick Ralphs	4:08
3.	"You're Never Alone"	Hart, Colwell	4:38
4.	"I Still Believe in You"	Vince Gill, John Barlow Jarvis	4:37
5.	"Ready for Love"	Ralphs	4:36
6.	"Waiting on Love"	Hart, Simon Kirke	4:32
7.	"Can't Get Enough"	Ralphs	3:41
8.	"Is That All There Is to Love"	Hart, Kirke	3:33
9.	"Love So Strong"	Hart, Colwell, Kirke	3:49
10.	"Silver, Blue and Gold"	Paul Rodgers	3:38
11.	"Downpour in Cairo"	Hart, Kirke	3:47
12.	"Shooting Star"	Rodgers	5:18
13.	"Simple Man"	Ralphs	4:37
14.	"Weep No More"	Kirke	3:57

== Personnel ==
Bad Company

- Robert Hart − vocals
- Mick Ralphs − lead guitar, slide guitar, keyboards
- Dave Colwell – guitar
- Rick Wills − bass guitar, backing vocals
- Simon Kirke − drums

Additional musicians

- Josh Leo – acoustic guitar, production
- Vince Gill – electric guitar
- Dean Howard, Richie Sambora – guitars
- Alison Krauss – fiddle, backing vocals
- Chris Dunn, Doug Moffet, Vinnie Ciesielski, William Fanning – horns
- Matt Rollings – piano
- John Hobbs – piano, organ, synthesizer
- Bill Cuomo, Carl Marsh, Jeff Bova – synthesizer
- Fats Kaplin – accordion
- Greg Morrow, Jim Capaldi – percussions
- Bekka Bramlett, Kim Carnes, Timothy B. Schmit – chorus, backing vocals
- Kim Carnes – vocals on "Silver, Blue & Gold" and "Shooting Star"
- Richie Sambora – lead guitar, rhythm guitar on "Shooting Star"

== Production ==
- Bad Company – producers
- Andy Jackson – engineer
- Amy Hughes, Sandy Jenkins – engineers, mixing, tracking
- Ben Fowler – engineer, mixing
- Ted Jensen – mastering
- John Kunz, John Thomas – tracking
- Aubrey Powell, Jim Shea, Simon Fowler – photography
- Jennifer Roddie – art direction
