= Distance (band) =

Rock/funk supergroup

- Genres: Rock music, funk music
- Years active: 1987–1989
- Spinoffs: The Power Station, Bad Company
- Spinoff of: Chic
- Past members: Bernard Edwards; Tony Thompson; Robert Hart

Distance was a English–American late-1980s rock/funk supergroup band led by bassist/producer Bernard Edwards, patterned after the Power Station. The band was composed of former Chic and the Power Station members Edwards (bass) and Tony Thompson (drums) with future Bad Company member Robert Hart on lead vocals, and noted session musicians Eddie Martinez on guitar and Jeff Bova on keyboards.

This "supergroup" released only one album, 1989's Under the One Sky on Reprise Records. The album failed to make the chart and produced no hits. Richard Drummie, one half of Go West, has a co-writing credit on the track "Everytime I Stand Up".

Distance appeared as the club band in the 1987 Whoopi Goldberg movie, Burglar. Edwards was the film's "music producer", and was credited for the songs that appeared within.

== Discography ==
=== Studio albums ===
- Under the One Sky (1989)

=== Soundtrack appearances ===
- "Bernie's Groove", "New Way of Living", "News at 11" (from Burglar) (1987)

== Film appearances ==
- Appeared as the club band in the Whoopi Goldberg movie, Burglar (1987)
