= Brain Capers =

Studio album by Mott the Hoople
- Released: 19 November 1971 (UK/Canada); January 1972 (US)
- Recorded: August–September 1971
- Studio: Island (London)
- Genre: Hard rock
- Length: 37:55
- Label: Island (UK/Canada), Atlantic (US)
- Producer: Guy Stevens

Mott the Hoople chronology
Wildlife (1971)	Brain Capers (1971)	All the Young Dudes (1972)

Professional ratings
Review scores
Source	Rating
Allmusic	4.5/5 stars
Christgau's Record Guide	B
Rolling Stone	favourable

Brain Capers is the fourth album by the band Mott the Hoople.

It was originally released in November 1971 in the UK by Island Records (catalogue number ILPS 9178) and on Island Records in Canada (cat. no. SW-9178), and was reissued in 2003 (on CD) by Angel Air (cat. no. SJPCD160). It was released January 1972 in the US on Atlantic Records (cat. no. SD 8304).

The release was not initially a commercial success, and was the only Mott the Hoople album that failed to chart in either the UK or US.

The initial working title of AC/DC would be abandoned in favour of a combination of alternate choices Brain Damage and Bizarre Capers. Ultimately, the album was titled Brain Capers as a compromise between the latter two. Earlier sessions, self-produced by the band, were also abandoned when Guy Stevens was called in to rescue the recording but a number of these tracks have resurfaced on All the Young Dudes: The Anthology and as bonus material on Angel Air's re-issues of Mott the Hoople albums.

The covers of the original UK and Canadian LPs do not feature the mask seen on the US version (and some later re-releases). There was an actual mask packaged inside with the UK version of the album, but not with the Canadian LP. The band name and line under it are in the centre of the cover where the mask would be and the title shifted upwards. The US and Canadian LPs do not have the inner sleeve picturing fighter planes that the original UK album had.

The album is dedicated to James Dean, as stated below the band photo on the back cover.

== Track listing ==
=== Side one ===
1. "Death May Be Your Santa Claus" (Ian Hunter, Verden Allen) – 4:48
2. "Your Own Backyard" (Dion DiMucci, Tony Fasce) – 4:12
3. "Darkness, Darkness" (Jesse Colin Young) – 4:28
4. "The Journey" (Hunter) – 9:15

=== Side two ===
1. "Sweet Angeline" (Hunter) – 4:49
2. "Second Love" (Allen) – 3:48
3. "The Moon Upstairs" (Hunter, Mick Ralphs) – 5:00
4. "The Wheel of the Quivering Meat Conception" (Hunter, Guy Stevens) – 1:15

"The Wheel of the Quivering Meat Conception" is essentially part two of "The Journey," beginning with a fade-in at the point where "The Journey" was earlier faded out.

On original pressings of Brain Capers, the running time of "The Journey" is incorrectly listed at 8:31, "Sweet Angeline" at 5:13, "The Moon Upstairs" at 5:13 and "The Wheel of the Quivering Meat Conception" is listed at 2:07.

=== 2003 CD bonus tracks ===
- "Midnight Lady" (Hunter, Ralphs) – 3:33
- "The Journey" (Hunter) – 9:47

== Personnel ==
=== Mott the Hoople ===
- Ian Hunter – guitar, keyboards, vocals
- Mick Ralphs – lead guitar, vocals
- Pete Watts – bass, vocals
- Dale "Buffin" Griffin – drums, vocals
- Verden Allen – keyboards, vocals

=== Additional musicians ===
- Jim Price – trumpet on "Second Love"
- Guy Stevens – piano, producer

=== Technical ===
- Andy Johns – engineer
- Zal Schreiber – mastering
- Richard Polak – photography
