= Penetrator (album) =

- Cover art by Boris Vallejo

Studio album by Ted Nugent
- Released: February 1984
- Recorded: July–August 1983
- Studios: Power Station, New York City; The Plant, Sausalito, California
- Genre: Hard rock
- Length: 40:41
- Label: Atlantic
- Producers: Ashley Howe, Doug Banker

Ted Nugent chronology
Nugent (1982)	Penetrator (1984)	Little Miss Dangerous (1986)

Singles from Penetrator
- 1. "Tied Up in Love" Released: February 1984; 2. "(Where Do You) Draw the Line" Released: April 1984

Penetrator is the eighth studio album by American rock musician Ted Nugent. It was released in February 1984 by Atlantic Records.

"Tied Up in Love" was made into a promo clip to support the album. It reached No. 56 on the Billboard 200 albums chart. The song "(Where Do You) Draw the Line", written by Bryan Adams and Jim Vallance, was originally recorded by Adams for his hit 1984 album Reckless but was left off the final track list. Adams' version eventually saw a release on the 30th anniversary reissue of Reckless.

The cover art is a section of the painting "Dragon Tattoo" by Boris Vallejo.

== Reception ==
Professional ratings
Review scores
Source	Rating
AllMusic	1.5/5 stars
Classic Rock	5/10 stars
Collector's Guide to Heavy Metal	5/10

In a largely negative review, John Franck of AllMusic proclaimed Penetrator to be "one of Nugent's most underwhelming releases".

== Track listing ==
All songs by Ted Nugent, except where indicated.

Side one
No.	Title	Writer(s)	Length
1.	"Tied Up in Love"	Randy Cate, Clif Magness, Nugent	4:23
2.	"(Where Do You) Draw the Line"	Bryan Adams, Jim Vallance	3:25
3.	"Knockin' at Your Door"	Andy Fraser	3:53
4.	"Don't You Want My Love"		3:30
5.	"Go Down Fighting"	Robin George, Nugent	4:42

Side two
No.	Title	Writer(s)	Length
6.	"Thunder Thighs"		4:07
7.	"No Man's Land"		3:24
8.	"Blame It on the Night"	Rick Blakemore, Dennis LaRue, Nugent	4:13
9.	"Lean Mean R & R Machine"		3:56
10.	"Take Me Home"		5:06

== Personnel ==
Band members

- Ted Nugent – guitars, six-string bass, lead vocals on tracks 6, 7, 9, 10
- Brian Howe – lead vocals on tracks 1–5, 8
- Alan St. Jon – keyboards, backing vocals
- Doug Lubahn – bass
- Bobby Chouinard – drums

Additional musicians

- Peter Wolf – percussion, sequencing
- Cynthia Shiloh, Kevin Russell, Rahni Raines, Tod Howarth, Zoe Fox – background vocals

Production

- Ashley Howe – producer, engineer, mixing
- Bill Scheniman – engineer
- Kevin Eddy – engineer, mixing
- Bob Ludwig – mastering
- Doug Banker – executive producer
- Eric Conn – digital remastering

== Charts ==
Chart (1984)	Peak position
US Billboard 200	56
