= Nugent (album) =

Studio album by Ted Nugent
- Released: June 17, 1982
- Recorded: February–April 1982
- Studio: Pasha Music House, Hollywood, California and March 1982 at A2 Studio, Ann Arbor, Michigan
- Genre: Hard rock
- Length: 39:34
- Label: Atlantic
- Producer: Ted Nugent

Ted Nugent chronology
Intensities in 10 Cities (1981)	Nugent (1982)	Penetrator (1984)

Singles from Nugent
- 1. "Bound and Gagged" Released: September 1982; 2. "No, No, No" Released: November 1982

Nugent is the seventh studio album by the American hard rock musician Ted Nugent. It was released in 1982 by Atlantic Records.

== Reception ==
Professional ratings
Review scores
Source	Rating
AllMusic	2/5 stars
Classic Rock	6/10 stars
Collector's Guide to Heavy Metal	4/10

John Franck of AllMusic was dismissive of Nugent, commenting that although the record had "a strong start", things "quickly deteriorate[d]", describing the rest of the album as "mediocre [...] to the just plain awful."

== Track listing ==
All songs written and arranged by Ted Nugent.

Side one
No.	Title	Length
1.	"No, No, No"	3:39
2.	"Bound and Gagged"	4:34
3.	"Habitual Offender"	3:09
4.	"Fightin' Words"	3:59
5.	"Good and Ready"	4:19

Side two
No.	Title	Length
6.	"Ebony"	4:26
7.	"Don't Push Me"	2:34
8.	"Can't Stop Me Now"	2:35
9.	"We're Gonna Rock Tonight"	3:21
10.	"Tailgunner"	7:03

== Personnel ==
Band members

- Ted Nugent – guitars, six string bass, lead vocals, producer, mixing
- Derek St. Holmes – lead vocals on tracks 1, 3, 5, 6, 8 & 10, rhythm guitar
- Dave Kiswiney – bass guitar, backing vocals
- Carmine Appice – drums, backing vocals

Additional musicians

- Donnie Backus – piano on "Can't Stop Me Now"
- Randy Bishop, Bart Bishop, Jude Cole, Mark Gerhardt, Shawn Murphy, Rick Wagoner, Kurt Wagoner, Verne Wagoner – backing vocals

Production

- David McCullough – assistant producer, mixing
- Larry Brown – engineer, mixing
- Al Hurschman, Dee Hurschman, Csaba Petocz, Mike Sanders, Tim Clark – assistant engineers
- Bernie Grundman – mastering
- Eric Conn – digital remastering

== Charts ==
Chart (1982)	Peak position
US Billboard 200	51
