= Holy Water (Bad Company album) =

1990 studio album by Bad Company

Studio album by Bad Company
- Released: 12 June 1990
- Recorded: 1989–1990
- Genre: Hard rock
- Length: 53:27
- Label: Atco
- Producers: Tony Harris, Andrew Scarth, Terry Thomas

Bad Company chronology
Dangerous Age (1988)	Holy Water (1990)	Here Comes Trouble (1992)

Singles from Holy Water
- 1. "Holy Water" Released: July 1990; 2. "If You Needed Somebody" Released: November 1990; 3. "Walk Through Fire" Released: July 1991

Professional ratings
Review scores
Source	Rating
AllMusic	3/5 stars
Entertainment Weekly	B
Select	2/5

Holy Water is the ninth studio album by the English hard rock band Bad Company, and their third with Brian Howe as lead vocalist. The album was released on 12 June 1990.

== Background ==
It went platinum, selling over 1,000,000 units, and climbed to No. 35 on the Billboard Top Pop Albums chart. The first single, "Holy Water", was a No. 1 Billboard Album Rock Tracks hit for two weeks during the summer of 1990 as the band toured the United States with Damn Yankees. The single "If You Needed Somebody" became a hit in early 1991, reaching No. 16 on the Billboard Hot 100 and No. 2 on the Album Rock Tracks chart. "Boys Cry Tough" (#3), "Stranger Stranger" (#9) and "Walk Through Fire" (#28 Hot 100 / #14 Album Rock Tracks) also received substantial airplay.

== Track listing ==
All songs written by Brian Howe and Terry Thomas, except where noted.

No.	Title	Writer(s)	Length
1.	"Holy Water"		4:06
2.	"Walk Through Fire"		4:48
3.	"Stranger Stranger"	Brian Howe, Simon Kirke, Terry Thomas	4:51
4.	"If You Needed Somebody"		4:21
5.	"Fearless"		3:32
6.	"Lay Your Love on Me"	Mick Ralphs	4:04
7.	"Boys Cry Tough"		5:34
8.	"With You in a Heartbeat"		4:34
9.	"I Don't Care"		4:33
10.	"Never Too Late"	Mick Ralphs, Terry Thomas	3:42
11.	"Dead of the Night"	Mick Ralphs, Terry Thomas	3:40
12.	"I Can't Live Without You"	Mick Ralphs, Terry Thomas	3:50
13.	"100 Miles"	Simon Kirke	1:57

== Personnel ==
Bad Company

- Brian Howe – lead vocals
- Mick Ralphs – guitars
- Simon Kirke – drums; lead vocals and acoustic guitar on "100 Miles"

Additional personnel

- Felix Krish – bass
- Terry Thomas – guitars, backing vocals, Hammond organ, percussion
- Lea Hart – backing vocals
- Tina Egan – additional backing vocals on "If You Needed Somebody"
- Rick Smith – accordion on "100 Miles"
- Paul Cullen – bass player during the tour. Also seen in the Holy Water Music Video

== Charts ==
Chart (1990)	Peak position
Canada Top Albums/CDs (RPM)	41
US Billboard 200	35
US AOR (Radio & Records)	1

== Certifications ==
Region	Certification	Certified units/sales
Canada (Music Canada)	Gold	50,000^{^}
United States (RIAA)	Platinum	1,000,000^{^}
^{^} Shipments figures based on certification alone.
