= Dangerous Age =

1988 studio album by Bad Company

Studio album by Bad Company
- Released: 15 August 1988
- Genres: Hard rock; arena rock
- Length: 44:31
- Label: Atlantic
- Producer: Terry Thomas

Bad Company chronology
Fame and Fortune (1986)	Dangerous Age (1988)	Holy Water (1990)

Singles from Dangerous Age
- 1. "No Smoke Without a Fire" Released: 1988; 2. "One Night" Released: August 1988; 3. "Shake It Up" Released: April 1989

Professional ratings
Review scores
Source	Rating
AllMusic	3/5 stars

Dangerous Age is the eighth studio album by hard rock band Bad Company. The album was released in August 1988. It was their second album with Brian Howe as lead vocalist and first with Steve Price credited as bass guitarist. It was produced and largely co-written by Terry Thomas. It helped bring the group back into the spotlight, with major radio airplay for the tracks "No Smoke Without a Fire" (#4), "One Night" (#9), "Shake It Up" (#9), and "Bad Man" (#20) appearing on Billboard's Album Rock Tracks chart.

== Track listing ==
All songs written by Brian Howe and Terry Thomas, except where noted.

No.	Title	Writer(s)	Length
1.	"One Night"	Mick Ralphs, Terry Thomas	4:38
2.	"Shake It Up"		3:56
3.	"No Smoke Without a Fire"		4:33
4.	"Bad Man"		3:45
5.	"Dangerous Age"	Mick Ralphs, Terry Thomas	3:45
6.	"Dirty Boy"		3:52
7.	"Rock of America"		3:55
8.	"Something About You"		4:17
9.	"The Way That It Goes"	Brian Howe, Mick Ralphs, Terry Thomas	3:25
10.	"Love Attack"	Brian Howe, Mick Ralphs, Terry Thomas	3:55
11.	"Excited"		4:32

== Personnel ==
Bad Company

- Brian Howe – vocals
- Mick Ralphs – guitar
- Simon Kirke – drums

with:

- Steve Price – bass
- Terry Thomas – Hammond organ, guitar, backing vocals
- Jon Mallison – backing vocals

== Charts ==
Chart (1988)	Peak position
Canada Top Albums/CDs (RPM)	84
US Billboard 200	58

== Certifications ==
Region	Certification	Certified units/sales
United States (RIAA)	Gold	500,000^{^}
^{^} Shipments figures based on certification alone.
