= Here Comes Trouble (Bad Company album) =

1992 studio album by Bad Company

Studio album by Bad Company
- Released: 22 September 1992
- Recorded: 1991–92
- Genre: Hard rock
- Length: 52:44
- Label: Atco
- Producer: Bad Company

Bad Company chronology
Holy Water (1990)	Here Comes Trouble (1992)	What You Hear Is What You Get (1993)

Singles from Here Comes Trouble
- 1. "How About That" Released: September 1992; 2. "This Could Be the One" Released: November 1992

Professional ratings
Review scores
Source	Rating
AllMusic	2.5/5 stars
Entertainment Weekly	F

Here Comes Trouble is the 10th studio album by the English hard rock band Bad Company, it would be the last studio album with Brian Howe as lead vocalist. The album was released in September 1992. The cover is an image by Mark Vincent of his young brother in front of a chopper. The title track received some airplay on classic rock radio, although "How About That" was the biggest single from the album, spending six weeks at the top of the Album Rock Tracks chart in the US.

== Track listing ==
All songs written by Brian Howe and Terry Thomas, except where noted.

No.	Title	Writer(s)	Length
1.	"How About That"		5:26
2.	"Stranger Than Fiction"		5:12
3.	"Here Comes Trouble"		4:10
4.	"This Could Be the One"		5:17
5.	"Both Feet in the Water"	Brian Howe, Mick Ralphs, Dave Colwell, Terry Thomas	4:42
6.	"Take This Town"		4:17
7.	"What About You"		3:54
8.	"Little Angel"	Brian Howe, Mick Ralphs, Terry Thomas	5:02
9.	"Hold on to My Heart"		4:40
10.	"Brokenhearted"		4:47
11.	"My Only One"	Simon Kirke, Larry Dvoskin	5:01

== Personnel ==
Bad Company

- Brian Howe – vocals
- Mick Ralphs – lead and rhythm guitar
- Felix Krish – bass
- Simon Kirke – drums, vocals (track 11)

Additional musicians

- Dave "Bucket" Colwell – guitar
- Terry Thomas – guitar, keyboards, Hammond organ, backing vocals
- Richard Cottle – keyboards on track 11
- Birdinia Armbruster, Richa Sands, Snovia Pierre – chorus

== Charts ==
Chart (1992)	Peak position
Canada Top Albums/CDs (RPM)	37
US Billboard 200	40

== Certifications ==
Region	Certification	Certified units/sales
Canada (Music Canada)	Gold	50,000^{^}
United States (RIAA)	Gold	500,000^{^}
^{^} Shipments figures based on certification alone.
