= One Night Only =

One Night Only may refer to:

== Film and television ==
- One Night Only (1986 film), a Canadian sex comedy featuring Lenore Zann
- One Night Only (2008 film), a Philippine sex comedy
- One Night Only (2016 film), a Chinese-Taiwanese romantic crime drama
- One Night Only (2026 film), an American romantic comedy
- One Night Only (TV series), a 2008 British variety show
- TNA One Night Only, a professional wrestling pay-per-view event series
- WWF One Night Only, a professional wrestling pay-per-view event

== Music ==
=== Albums ===
- One Night Only (Bee Gees album), 1998
- One Night Only: Live, a 1998 album by Black 'N Blue
- Elton John One Night Only – The Greatest Hits, a 2000 live album
- One Night Only: The Greatest Hits Live at Madison Square Garden, a 2000 DVD by Elton John
- One Night Only (video), 1999, by Ricky Martin
- One Night Only with Ricky Martin, a 2005–2006 tour by Ricky Martin
- One Night Only (band), a British indie rock group
  - One Night Only (One Night Only album), 2010
- One Night Only (Pascal & Pearce album)
- One Night Only (Thin Lizzy album), 2000
- One Night Only: Barbra Streisand and Quartet at The Village Vanguard, a 2010 DVD

=== Songs ===
- "One Night Only" (song), from the musical Dreamgirls
- "One Night Only" (Krystal Klear song)
- "One Night Only" (The Struts song)

== See also ==
- For One Night Only (disambiguation)
- One Night (disambiguation)
