= Robert Hart (musician) =

English singer (born 1958)

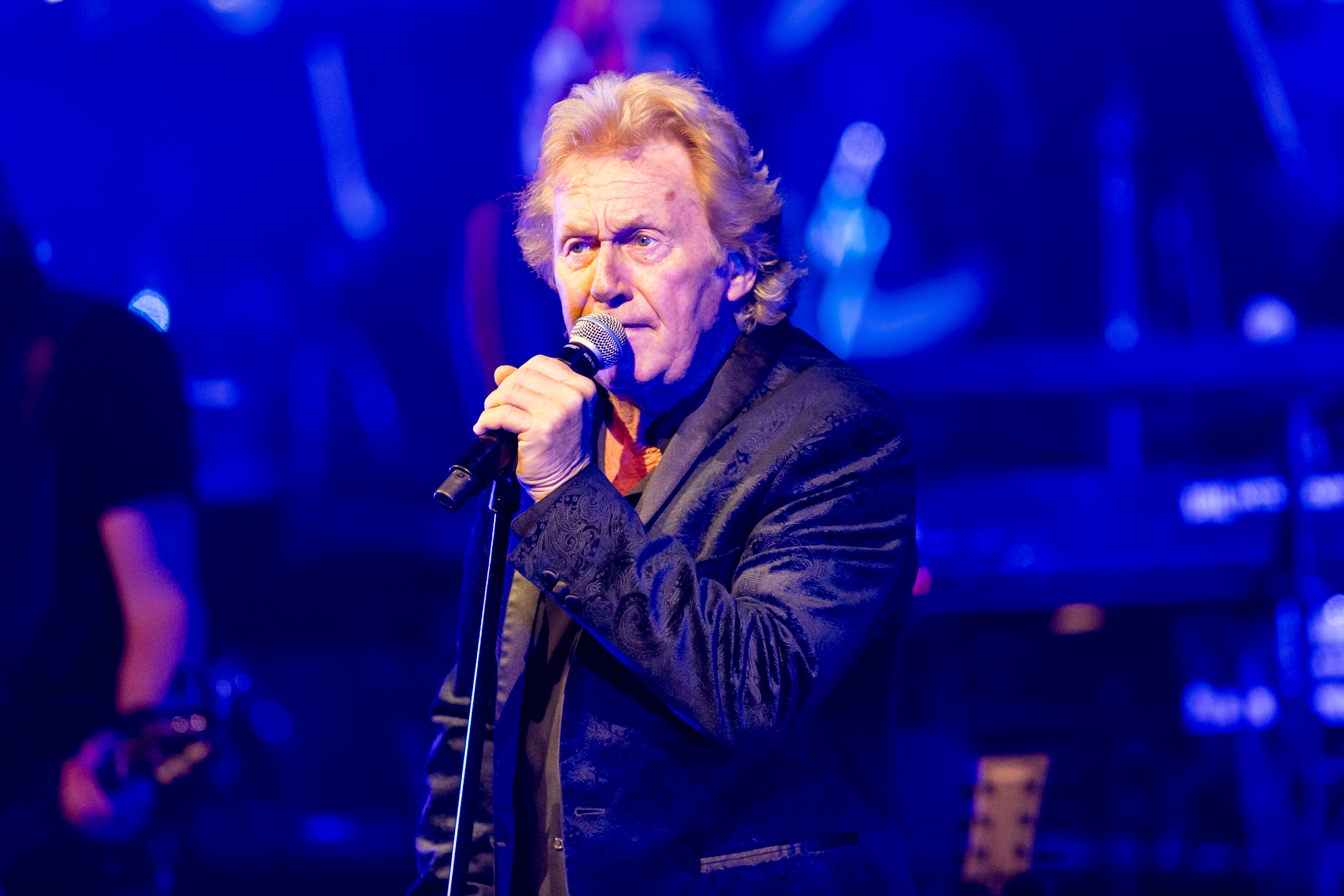
- Hart in 2024

Background information
- Born: 1 November 1958 (age 67); Bournemouth, Hampshire, England
- Genres: Hard rock, blues rock, funk
- Occupations: Singer, musician, songwriter
- Instrument: Vocals
- Years active: 1980s–present
- Labels: Island, Atlantic, Hollywood

Robert Hart (born 1 November 1958) is an English vocalist and songwriter. He is currently the lead singer of Manfred Mann's Earth Band and Bad Co Legacy. He has performed as a solo artist, and with bands including The Distance, Diesel and Bad Company, as well as with former Whitesnake members in Company of Snakes. He also fronted The Jones Gang, a rock group formed by Hart, Rick Wills and Kenney Jones. He was the first English writer to be signed to Disney-owned Hollywood Records.

== Career ==
Chris Blackwell signed Hart to his Island Records label in the 1980s and teamed him with Bernard Edwards. The two men produced collaborated on several projects, including the soundtrack for the Whoopi Goldberg film, The Burglar. The Distance was commercially successful in Japan. After leaving the band Hart moved to Atlantic Records as a solo artist, with Stewart Levine producing his first album, Cries and Whispers.

He then became the first English artist to be signed by Disney-owned Hollywood Records, and worked with Russ Ballard on Hart's self-titled album, Robert Hart, which charted in more than 18 countries.

=== Bad Company ===
During 1992, Hart was approached by Mick Ralphs and Simon Kirke and asked if he would like to join them as the third lead vocalist for Bad Company, following Paul Rodgers and Brian Howe. Hart performed with Bad Company, including in the US and Canada. In July 1994 a contract was drawn up by Alliance Artists and Legend Management and signed by the then Bad Company line up, Mick Ralphs, Simon Kirke, Hart, Dave Colwell and Rick Wills, giving Hart the right to perform, write and record songs and albums and receive royalty payments as a full Bad Company member. In 1995 a self-produced Bad Company album was released, Company of Strangers, with Hart, who bore a vocal similarity to Paul Rodgers. It contained four tracks self-penned or co-written by Hart. The band made a promotional tour of the US with Bon Jovi. Griffin Music of America also re-issued Take This! on compact disc. In 1996 another Bad Co album, Stories Told & Untold featured Hart. Stories Told & Untold, contained seven new compositions and seven acoustic versions including 'Can't Get Enough' and 'Ready For Love'. Hart was also lead vocalist on three live albums between 1994 and 2001. In March 2020 he was on tour in Germany with “Rock meets classic“ featuring Alice Cooper. The tour was cut short because of the COVID-19 situation.

=== The Jones Gang ===
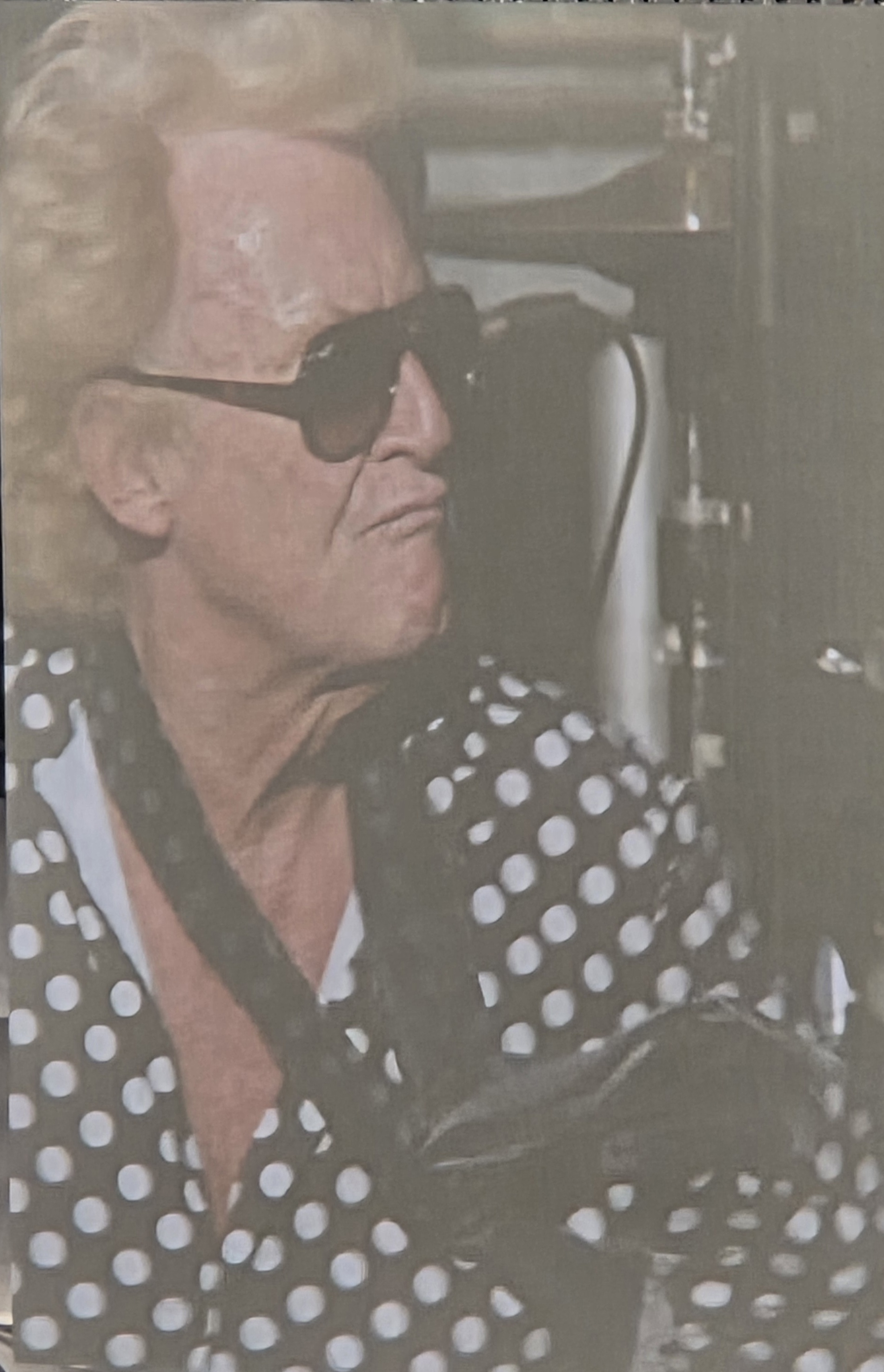
Robert Hart in Clam Rock 2026 in Austria

After Bad Company, Hart became the frontman with the Jones Gang. Hart formed the trio with Kenney Jones in 2001. Hart wrote a charity song titled "It's All About The Children" for which Hart and Jones and other artists played on the record. They included: Paul Young, Gary Granger, Ronnie Wood, and Rick Wills. The band recorded an album titled Any Day Now which Hart co-wrote all of the tracks and sole wrote most of the tracks. The album was released in the U.S. on 9 August 2005. The debut single "Angel" written by Hart, and Russ Ballard went to number 1 on the ACQB Top 40 charts, staying there for a further 11 weeks. The album overall was commercially successful and another two songs by Hart reached the top ten of Billboard's Hot 100 Singles Sales Chart .

The airline company USA 3000 commissioned 14 planes to have The Jones Gang album cover art work on as drawn by Ronnie Wood from the Rolling Stones. These planes were the first sent in the rescue operation of people affected by Hurricane Wilma.

=== Manfred Mann's Earth Band ===
On 13 March 2011, Manfred Mann announced Hart as the new singer for his formation Manfred Mann's Earth Band. Though he has not recorded any studio material with the band to date, he does guest appear on Mann's solo album Lone Arranger (2014).

=== XBad Company / Bad Co Legacy ===
Hart had played with Dave "Bucket" Colwell, Pat Davey and Gary "Harry" James over many years, in bands such as Bad Company and the Jones Gang. They have worked together on various albums, co-written songs and have toured the world together, and they collectively formed the band XBad Company. They recorded a FIFA World Cup song called "We Ain't Going Home Empty Handed". Since 2024, Colwell and Hart have been performing together under the band name Bad Co Legacy.

=== Help for Heroes ===
Hart gave permission for his song "We Will Remember Them" to be recorded by various artists for the charity Help for Heroes. On 1 November 2009, Robin Gibb, Michael Bolton, Mica Paris, Paul Rodgers and Lee Mead, who won TV's Any Dream Will Do and others recorded it at Abbey Road Studios in London.

=== Collaborations with other artists ===
Over the years Hart has also been involved in projects with Andy Taylor of Duran Duran, Peter Maffay, members of Chic and Go West.

== Discography ==
=== Studio albums ===
- Cries and Whispers (1989)
- Robert Hart (1992)
- Pure (2020)
- Circus life (2024)

=== with Distance ===
- Under the One Sky (1989)

=== with Bad Company ===
- Company of Strangers (1995)
- Stories Told & Untold (1996)

=== with XBad Company ===
- Live at Hampshire Beach Ballroom (1999)
- "We Aint Going Home Empty Handed" (World Cup Song) (2009)

=== Singles ===
- "Boys on the Corner" (1992)
- "Fooled Around and Fell in Love" (1993)
- "Heart and Soul" (1994)
- "A Little Love Is Overdue" (1999)
- "Angel" (2005)
- "We Will Remember Them" (2009)

=== Guest appearances ===
- All About the Children (All Star Charity Band 2002)
- Any Day Now (2005) (The Jones Gang)
- Endangered Species - Tony Ashton and Friends live at the Abbey Road (2009) (Company of Snakes)
- Into the Fire (2014) (Diesel)
- Lone Arranger (2014) (Manfred Mann)

=== Soundtrack appearances ===
Title	Release	Contribution	Other artist(s)	Soundtrack
"Bernie's Groove"	1987	lead vocals	Distance	Burglar
"New Way of Living"	1987	lead vocals	Distance	Burglar
"News at 11"	1987	lead vocals	Distance	Burglar
	1998	performance as a mad drummer, "Mick"		Richie Rich's Christmas Wish
"With You (Song for Kate)"	2009	writer	Jonah Johnson	My Sister's Keeper
