= Mad Shadows (album) =

Studio album by Mott the Hoople
- Released: 25 September 1970
- Recorded: November 1969 – April 1970
- Studio: Olympic (London)
- Genre: Hard rock
- Length: 35:45
- Label: Island, Atlantic
- Producer: Guy Stevens

Mott the Hoople chronology
Mott the Hoople (1969)	Mad Shadows (1970)	Wildlife (1971)

Professional ratings
Review scores
Source	Rating
AllMusic	2/5 stars
Rolling Stone	favourable

Mad Shadows was the second album by Mott the Hoople. It was recorded in 1970 and released in the UK on Island Records in September 1970 (catalogue number ILPS 9119) and in the US by Atlantic Records (cat. no. SD 8272). It was subsequently re-released by Angel Air in 2003 (SJPCD158). As with their debut album, it was produced by Guy Stevens.

The original pressing reached No. 48 in the UK Albums Chart in October 1970.

== Critical reception ==
Stephen Thomas Erlewine of AllMusic gave the album two stars out of five and stated:

If Mott the Hoople's debut album cheerfully careened all over the place, their second, Mad Shadows, has one direction – downward into dense murk.

== Track listing ==
All songs written by Ian Hunter except where noted.

Side one

1. "Thunderbuck Ram" (Mick Ralphs) – 4:51
2. "No Wheels to Ride" – 5:49
3. "You Are One of Us" – 2:22
4. "Walkin' with a Mountain" – 3:52

Side two

1. "I Can Feel" – 7:15
2. "Threads of Iron" (Ralphs) – 5:11
3. "When My Mind's Gone" – 6:25
- Note: the times on the sleeve and record centre on early pressings are incorrect for "No Wheels To Ride" (listed as 6:02), "You Are One Of Us" (listed as 3:22) and "Threads Of Iron" (listed as 5:51). The times above are correct.

2003 CD bonus tracks

8. "It Would Be a Pleasure" (Ralphs) – 1:50
9. "How Long? (Death May Be Your Santa Claus)" (Hunter, Verden Allen) – 3:54

== Personnel ==
Mott the Hoople

- Ian Hunter – lead vocals (tracks 2–5, 7–9), co-lead vocals (6), piano
- Mick Ralphs – guitar, backing vocals, lead vocals (track 1), co-lead vocals (6)
- Pete "Overend" Watts – bass
- Dale "Buffin" Griffin – drums
- Verden Allen – organ

Additional personnel

- Guy Stevens – "psychic" piano, "spiritual" percussion

Technical

- Guy Stevens – producer
- Andy Johns – engineer
- Ginny Smith, Peter Sanders – cover design
- Gabi Naseman – front cover photography

== Charts ==
Chart (1970)	Peak position
UK Albums (OCC)	48
