= One-night stand (disambiguation) =

A one-night stand is either a non-recurring theatrical performance or a sexual encounter lasting one night.

One-night stand may also refer to:

== In film ==
- One Night Stand (1984 film), a John Duigan film
- One Night Stand (1997 film), a Mike Figgis film
- One Night Stand (2016 film), a Jasmine D'Souza film

== In music ==
- One Night Stand (festival), regional music event by radio station Triple J
- One Night Stand (musical), a musical by Herb Gardner and Jule Styne
- One Night Stand (opera), 2011 opera by Finnish composer Olli Kortekangas
- One Night Stand (Gary B.B. Coleman album), 1989
- One Night Stand, a 1973 album by Noel Paul Stookey (and its title song)
- One Night Stand, a 1979 album by Fandango
- One Night Stand (Flamin' Groovies album), 1987
- "One Night Stand" (Mis-Teeq song), a song by Mis-Teeq
- "One Night Stand" (Keri Hilson song), a song by Keri Hilson and Chris Brown
- "One Nite Stand (Of Wolves and Sheep)", a song by Sarah Connor
- "Free Loop (One Night Stand)", a 2005 song by Daniel Powter
- "One Night Stand", a track on the 1974 Rick Nelson and the Stone Canyon Band album, Windfall (songwriter, Dennis Larden)
- "One Night Stand", a 2014 song by TWiiNS and Flo Rida
- "One Night Stand", a song by Paul Anka and Wes Farrell
- "One Night Stand", a song by The Aloof from their 1996 album Sinking
- One Night Stand: Ladies Only Tour, a 2008 tour by Usher in support of his album Here I Stand
- "One Night Stand", a song by Keith Moon from his 1975 album Two Sides of the Moon
- "One Night Stand", a song by Small Faces from their 1966 album Small Faces
- "One Night Stand", a 2006 song by Motörhead from their album Kiss of Death

== In television ==
- One Night Stand (Grimm), an episode of Grimm
- One Night Stand (CSI episode), an episode of CSI: Miami
- One Night Stand, an episode of Ever Decreasing Circles
- One Night Stand (Canadian TV series), a 1976 Canadian music television series
- One Night Stand (American TV series), a stand-up comedy television series
- Dave's One Night Stand, a British stand-up comedy programme
- WWE One Night Stand (formerly ECW One Night Stand), a pay-per-view wrestling event

== Other ==
- One Night Stand (video game), a video game
