= One Night Stand (Canadian TV program) =

Canadian music television program

- Genre: Music
- Directed by: Dee Gilchrist
- Presented by: Rob Parker; Mel Profit
- Country of origin: Canada
- Original language: English
- No. of seasons: 1
- No. of episodes: 10

Production
- Producer: John Martin
- Running time: 30 minutes

Original release
- Network: CBC Television
- Release: 17 April – 17 September 1976

One Night Stand is a Canadian music television program that aired on CBC Television in 1976.

== Premise ==
This program featured Toronto concerts in the rock and pop genres, presented by either Rob Parker and Mel Profit who alternated as episode hosts. Featured artists included Dianne Heatherington, Joe Mendelson of Mainline, Domenic Troiano Band and the Christopher Ward Band.

John Martin, later of MuchMusic, produced One Night Stand.

== Scheduling ==
This half-hour program was broadcast on Saturdays at 7:00 p.m. (Eastern) from 17 April to 26 June 1976, with two final broadcasts aired Fridays at 7:00 p.m. on 10 and 17 September 1976.
