= Dave Colwell =

British guitarist (born 1964)

- Also known as: Dave Bucket
- Born: David Colwell; 1 August 1964 (age 62); London, England
- Genres: Rock
- Occupation: Musician
- Instruments: Guitar, Vocals
- Years active: 1984–present

David Colwell (born 1 August 1964, also known as Dave Bucket) is a British rock guitarist who has been a member of Bad Company, Samson, ASAP, The Eastenders, The Entire Population of Hackney, 720, The Torpedoes, Angel Street, Roger Chapman's Shortlist, The Jones Gang, FM, Frankie Miller's Fullhouse (2017 lineup) and Rock Steady. He recorded Back on Track with Humble Pie in 2001, touring with them until the band broke up in 2003. He started a supergroup called Rock Steady which, among others, included bass guitarist Rick Wills, best known for his work with Foreigner and his associations with Small Faces, Peter Frampton and Bad Company and did a New Zealand tour with this band. In November 2018 he once again joined Humble Pie (reformed by Jerry Shirley and lead singer Jimmy Kunes of Cactus) for their US tour. Dave Colwell has his own band now which is called Bucket's Rebel Heart. Their debut album 20 Good Summers was released in December 2018 on Pride & Joy Records, and in January 2019 in Japan on Marquee Records.

== Solo album ==
Colwell started recording his first solo album Guitars, Beers & Tears in 2008, and it was released in 2010. There were a number of Colwell's associates playing on this album, including Steve Conte (New York Dolls), Adrian Smith (Iron Maiden), Robert Hart (The Jones Gang, Bad Company), Edwin McCain, Bekka Bramlett, Danny Bowes (Thunder), Spike (The Quireboys) and Jaz Lochrie.

== Samson ==
Colwell became an official member of Samson in 1984, along with bassist Merv Goldsworthy. He played on the live album Thank You and Goodnight (1985), recorded during the 1984 tour. Samson temporarily disbanded in May 1984. He then became member of the short-lived new band "Paul Samson's Empire", in 1986–1987, in support of Samson album Joint Forces (1986). Colwell played on the live album Paul Samson's Empire - Live at the Marquee, which also contains three studio tracks.

== Bucket's Rebel Heart ==
Dave Colwell formed his own band in 2018 with Paul 'Taff' Edwards formerly of the 720 and Torpedoes. the line up included Colwell (guitars and vocals), Edwards (drums), Jim Stapley formerly of The Jones Gang (lead vocals and guitar) and Dave Boyce formerly of Samson on bass. Their debut album 20 Good Summers was released in December 2018 on Pride and Joy Records and in January 2019 it was released in Japan by Marquee Records. Colwell and Edwards wrote all the songs and produced the album. The band had its live debut at 'Sweden Rock Festival' in 2018.

== Song writing credits ==
Colwell is credited with writing the song "Reach Out", performed by Iron Maiden and used as a b-side on the "Wasted Years" single. He is credited on seven of the ten tracks featured on Humble Pie's Back on Track album released by Sanctuary in 2002. He co-wrote two songs on the Bad Company album Here Comes Trouble, also five songs on Bad Company's Company of Strangers in 1995. Also contributing two songs for Stories Told & Untold released 1996.

== DBC & Friends ==
In 2013, Colwell together with Ross McEwen formed a band fronted by Colwell. This band toured Scotland and Cyprus, performing a set list of the greatest hits of Bad Co, Free and material from Colwell's 2010 solo album. In 2014 the band recorded its first album of original material 'WhiskeyLand' on which they wrote all the tracks. The album was released in July 2014.
