= Mick Ralphs =

British guitarist (1944–2025)

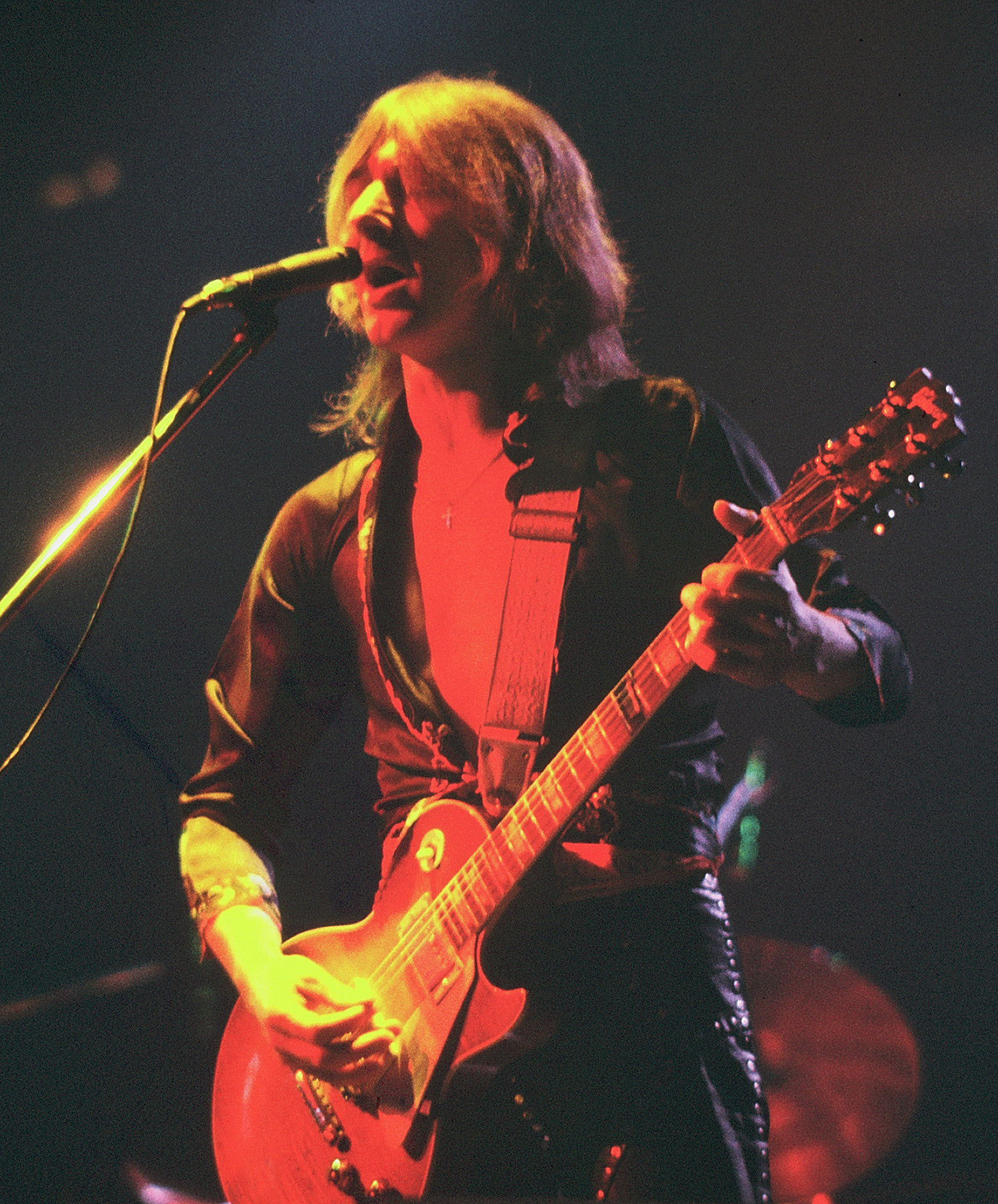
- Ralphs in 1976

Background information
- Born: Michael Geoffrey Ralphs; 31 March 1944; Stoke Lacy, England
- Origin: Hereford, England
- Died: 23 June 2025 (aged 81) Henley-on-Thames, England
- Genres: Hard rock; blues rock; glam rock
- Occupation: Musician; songwriter
- Instruments: Guitar; vocals; keyboards
- Years active: 1964–2016
- Labels: Island; CBS; Swan Song
- Formerly of: Mott the Hoople; Bad Company; Mick Ralphs Blues Band
- Spouse: Susie Chavasse
- Website: Official Facebook page

Michael Geoffrey Ralphs (31 March 1944 – 23 June 2025) was an English guitarist, vocalist and songwriter. He was a founding member of English rock bands Mott the Hoople and Bad Company. Despite not being a constant member, he appeared on every studio album released by both bands. In 2011, he formed the Mick Ralphs Blues Band with musicians he had met in a jam session.

Ralphs was described as "a versatile and skilful guitarist who could play anything from crunching power chords to delicate acoustic picking" and as "a major songwriting contributor."

== Early life and career ==
Ralphs was born on 31 March 1944 in Stoke Lacy, Herefordshire. He did not start playing until he was 18, and described the music when he was growing up as bubblegum like Cliff Richard and Bobby Vee. He began his career playing with the blues-rock band the Buddies and released a single with them in 1964 before joining the Mod Doc Thomas Group in 1966. After a debut album that band changed its name twice, first to Silence in 1968 and then to Mott the Hoople in 1969. Ralphs remained with the band until 1973; he left soon after they achieved their commercial breakthrough with the David Bowie-produced album All the Young Dudes. Ralphs's last appearance with Mott the Hoople was on the Mott album in 1973 which featured the hit "All the Way from Memphis". The lyrics tell the story of Ralphs having his guitar stolen on Long Island before a gig in Memphis in 1972.

Ralphs founded Bad Company with vocalist Paul Rodgers from Free. Described as a "rock supergroup", their manager Peter Grant was the manager of Led Zeppelin, and Bad Company were the first band signed to Zeppelin's Swan Song label. The band's debut album, Bad Company in 1974, included the hit track written by Ralphs, "Can't Get Enough", for which he tuned his guitar in open-C tuning. He said it did not sound right in standard tuning: "It needs the open C to have that ring." The debut album reached number one in the United States. Ralphs continued to record and tour with Bad Company until they folded in 1982, after the release of Rough Diamonds. He commented, "Bad Company had become bigger than us all and to continue would have destroyed someone or something."

In 1984 he toured with Pink Floyd guitarist David Gilmour on Gilmour's About Face tour, although he did not play on the album. In 1985, Ralphs released a solo album, Take This, which included Free and Bad Company drummer Simon Kirke. He worked with future Bad Company guitarist Dave Colwell for a four-run live support of the album, which also featured drummer Chris Slade of Manfred Mann's Earth Band and keyboard player Lindsay Bridgewater, who performed with Ozzy Osbourne. He did one performance with a band called Cold Turkey.

Bad Company reformed with different line-ups between 1986 and 1998. After a reunion tour with the original band in 1999, Ralphs announced that he was giving up touring, which he had never been comfortable with as he had an extreme fear of flying.

His second solo work, It's All Good, an instrumental album, was released in 2001. Two years later his That's Life – Can't Get Enough album was released, including a demo version of "Can't Get Enough".

In 2004 he again worked with former Mott colleague Ian Hunter, playing second lead guitar (with Andy York) on Hunter's UK tour. Ralphs performed at Hunter's May 2004 concert at the London Astoria, which was filmed and released as a DVD titled "Just Another Night" the following year.

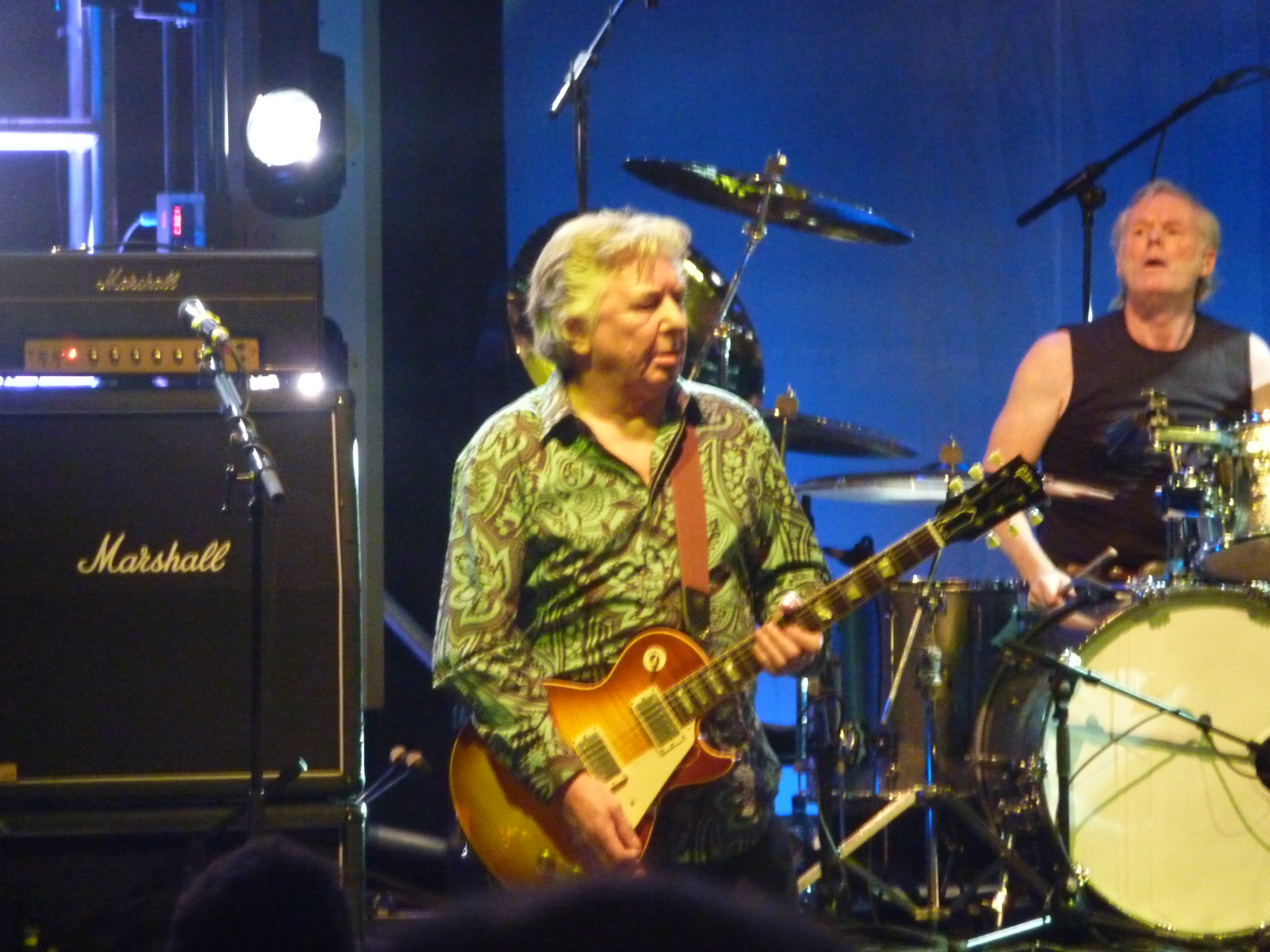
Ralphs performing with Mott the Hoople at a reunion gig, Hammersmith Apollo, October 2009

On 2 July 2008, it was announced that the original line-up of Bad Company (without Boz Burrell, who had died in September 2006) would do a one-off gig at the Hard Rock Hotel and Casino in Hollywood, Florida, on 8 August 2008. According to Rodgers, the band played this show to "protect the legacy they have built and cement the rights to the trademark Bad Company for touring."

Mott the Hoople, including Ralphs, reunited for two shows at the Blake Theatre in Monmouth, close to Rockfield Studios, where they rehearsed before playing five concerts at the Hammersmith Apollo in London, during September and October 2009. All five of the original members participated in the reunion with Martin Chambers assisting on drums.

In 2011 Ralphs formed the Mick Ralphs Blues Band with musicians he met in a jam session at the Nag's Head pub in High Wycombe: Stuart 'Son' Maxwell, harmonica/vocals; Jim Maving, guitar; Sam Kelly, drums and Dickey Baldwin, bass. The band's website stated that Ralphs was exploring his blues and soul roots, playing covers of classic blues and R&B songs. The band made its debut, as Mick Ralphs and Co, at the Jagz Club in Ascot, Berkshire in June 2011, and changed the name to the Mick Ralphs Blues Band soon afterwards.

In 2013 and 2014, Bad Company and Lynyrd Skynyrd jointly toured the United States and Canada, commemorating the 40th anniversary of the release of Skynyrd's first album, (Pronounced 'Lĕh-'nérd 'Skin-'nérd) and Bad Company's formation.

In 2016, Bad Company announced a US tour with Joe Walsh. Ralphs said that he would not participate in this tour and that Rich Robinson of the Black Crowes would stand in for him. In June 2016, the group announced a UK arena tour with special guests Richie Sambora and Orianthi, culminating in a show at London's O2 Arena on 29 October. Ralphs rejoined the band for the duration of the tour. After the band's concluding performance in London, it was reported that Ralphs had been hospitalized after suffering a stroke. He never returned to the band, and his lead guitar parts were played by second guitarist Howard Leese and keyboard parts by Rodgers.

== Personal life and death ==
Ralphs was married three times. His first marriage ended in divorce. His third wife was Susie Chavasse. He had two children and three step-children.

Ralphs spent the final years of his life bedridden after a stroke. He died at a care facility in Henley-on-Thames, Oxfordshire, on 23 June 2025, aged 81.

== Style and legacy ==
Writing in Ralphs's obituary for The Guardian, Adam Sweeting said, "Though modest about his own accomplishments, he was a versatile and skilful guitarist who could play anything from crunching power chords to delicate acoustic picking, and was also a major songwriting contributor."

Reviewing his career, Blues Rock Review, said, "Never a virtuoso or an overly flashy player, Ralphs' guitar chops always felt workman-like: laser-focused on skilfully and passionately providing exactly what the song called for without flashy embellishments. Some of the most iconic crunchy riffs of '70s-era blues rock came from his hands while in Bad Company, but Ralphs also toured with such legends as David Gilmour and led a solo career full of treats for blues rockers."

Before his death, Ralphs was able to express his happiness that Bad Company were due to be inducted into the Rock and Roll Hall of Fame in November 2025.

== Guitars ==
- Mott the Hoople – Gibson Les Paul Junior
- Bad Company – Fender Telecaster, Fender Stratocaster, Gibson Les Paul Standard, Fender Esquire, Gibson Flying V (as seen in the "Feel Like Makin' Love" official video)
- Burns with tri-sonic pickups
- Martin D-76 Bicentennial
- Rosetti Lucky 7

== Notable songwriting credits ==
- "Rock and Roll Queen" (1969)
- "Ready for Love" (1972)
- "One of the Boys" with Ian Hunter (1972)
- "Movin' On" (1972)
- "Can't Get Enough" (1973)
- "Good Lovin' Gone Bad" (1975)
- "Feel Like Makin' Love" with Paul Rodgers (1974)
- "Flying Hour" with George Harrison (1978)
- "Oh, Atlanta" (recorded originally by Bad Company on the album Desolation Angels (1978); later covered by Alison Krauss)

== Discography ==
=== Solo ===
- 1984 – Take This − Re-edited on CD in 1996
- 2001 – It's All Good − Recorded live in 1999 with Simon Kirke and Boz Burrell
- 2003 – That's Life

=== Mott the Hoople ===
- 1969 – Mott the Hoople
- 1970 – Mad Shadows
- 1971 – Wildlife
- 1971 – Brain Capers
- 1972 – All the Young Dudes
- 1972 – Rock and Roll Queen (compilation album)
- 1973 – Mott
- 1974 – The Hoople − Ralphs sang backup vocals on "Pearl 'n' Roy (England)" and played rhythm guitar on "Roll Away the Stone".

=== Bad Company ===
- 1974 – Bad Company
- 1975 – Straight Shooter
- 1976 – Run With The Pack
- 1977 – Burnin' Sky
- 1979 – Desolation Angels
- 1982 – Rough Diamonds
- 1985 – 10 from 6 (compilation)
- 1986 – Fame and Fortune
- 1988 – Dangerous Age
- 1990 – Holy Water
- 1992 – Here Comes Trouble
- 1993 – What You Hear Is What You Get: The Best of Bad Company (live album)
- 1995 – Company of Strangers
- 1996 – Stories Told & Untold
- 1999 – The 'Original' Bad Co. Anthology (compilation)
- 2006 – Live in Albuquerque 1976 (live album)}
- 2010 – Hard Rock Live (live album)
- 2011 – Live at Wembley (live album)
- 2016 – Live in Concert 1977 & 1979 (live album)

=== Mick Ralphs Blues Band ===
- 2013 – I Should Know Better
- 2016 – If It Ain't Broke

=== Collaborations ===
- 1971: Under Open Skies by Luther Grosvenor
- 1984: Ralphs toured with David Gilmour to support his second solo album About Face, with Gregg Dechert on keyboards, Mickey Feat on bass, Sue Evans and Jody Linscott on percussions, Raphael Ravenscroft on saxophone, flute and keyboards and Chris Slade on drums. No live album has been released but a video of a performance at the Hammersmith Odeon was released in 1984 with special guests: Roy Harper (vocals, percussion) and Nick Mason (drums).
