= Brian Howe (singer) =

English singer (1953–2020)

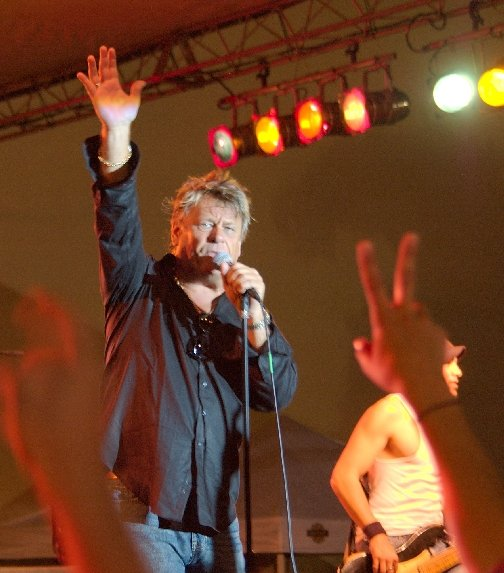
- Howe in concert, March 2009

Background information
- Born: Brian Anthony Howe; 22 July 1953; Portsmouth, Hampshire, England
- Died: 6 May 2020 (aged 66) Lake Placid, Florida, U.S.
- Genres: Hard rock; pop rock; heavy metal
- Occupation: Singer
- Instrument: Vocals
- Years active: 1983–2020
- Labels: Touchwood; Frontiers
- Formerly of: White Spirit; Ted Nugent; Bad Company
- Website: brianhowe.com

Brian Anthony Howe (22 July 1953 – 6 May 2020) was an English rock singer, best known for replacing Paul Rodgers as the lead vocalist of Bad Company. Howe's career was jump-started in 1983 when Ted Nugent recruited him to handle lead vocals for his Penetrator album and front its subsequent world tour.

== Early career ==
Howe was born in Portsmouth in 1953. He sang with a local band called Shy who had one minor hit single in the UK but he quickly quit, seeking a harder rock band. He had a brief stint with the NWOBHM group White Spirit, having replaced their recently departed singer Bruce Ruff. However, the group quickly collapsed, and Howe never recorded an album with them. A sole cut, "Watch Out", surfaced on Neat Records' 60 Minutes Plus cassette compilation in 1982, also issued on vinyl as All Hell Let Loose by Neat in conjunction with Italy's Base Records label in 1983. The song was also released on CD by US-based label Prism Entertainment on their Metal Minded compilation in 1987, and appeared as a bonus track on the CD reissue of the 1980 White Spirit album in 2005.

Following the discovery of a cassette tape containing studio demos recorded in 1981 of what was to be the second White Spirit album, careful restoration took place to retrieve the original Brian Howe vocals and musical performances. This was to form the basis of a new White Spirit album Right or Wrong, released through Conquest Music in July 2022. Guest performers on the album include Neil Murray, Russell Gilbrook, Jeff Scott Soto, Steve Overland and Lee Small.

== With Ted Nugent ==
Howe's first gig in the U.S. was with Ted Nugent in 1984. He had been sending songs to Atlantic Records in London to try to get a deal. Atlantic said that they did not hear a single but they liked his voice. One day, Ashley Howe (not related but producer of Ted Nugent's upcoming album) was walking down the corridor of Atlantic's offices and heard his voice. Ashley Howe had been looking for a singer for the next Ted Nugent album and thought that Howe would be a good fit. Howe was soon in New York City and signed a contract to become the lead singer for Ted Nugent and sang on the Penetrator album. The contract was not favorable to Howe, finding him working at a vastly reduced rate (~$450/week), and he ultimately left to pursue a solo career and album due to lack of writing credits on songs such as "Tied Up In Love". After a call from Mick Jones of Foreigner, whom Howe tried to work with earlier in his career, Howe was introduced to Mick Ralphs and Simon Kirke of Bad Company.

== With Bad Company ==
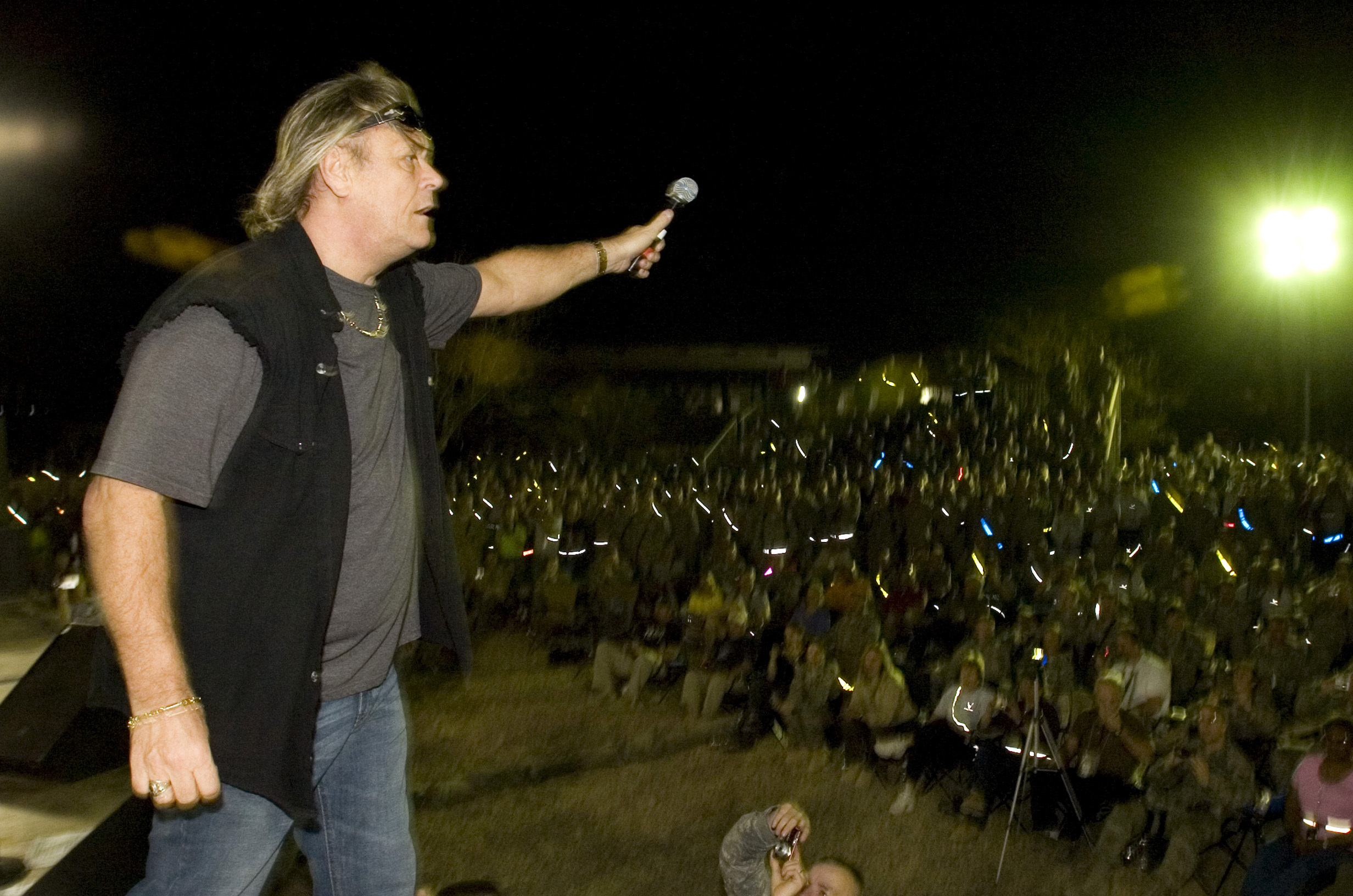
Howe performing in Iraq in 2010

In 1986, Mick Ralphs and Simon Kirke decided to regroup for a new project. Their label, Atlantic Records, however, insisted they resume the Bad Company name, but Paul Rodgers was already engaged with a new supergroup called The Firm. With Rodgers gone, the remaining two members partnered with ex-Ted Nugent vocalist Brian Howe as the new lead singer. "Mick told me that I had to get away from Ted and go to New York where Mick and Simon wanted to meet up with me," Howe related. "So I made up some story to leave and went to the Mayflower Hotel, where we decided to give things a go."

In addition, they hired Steve Price as the new bass player and Gregg Dechert (ex-Uriah Heep) on keyboards. Howe's vocal style brought more of a pop-rock sound to the band, which Atlantic Records, looking to bring the band back up to arena status, was looking for after declining turnouts to previous live performances and the dismal sales of Rough Diamonds. The band hired Foreigner producer Keith Olsen to produce the new line-up's initial album, 1986's Fame and Fortune. Reflecting the musical style of the mid-1980s, the album was laden with keyboards, unlike previous Bad Company albums, and was modestly commercially successful. The single "This Love" managed to reach No. 85 on the UK Singles Chart, but was not the success the band hoped for, but things were about to change.

In 1987, Dechert was dropped from the line-up as the group decided not to play up the keyboards in their sound as much. They toured that year supporting Deep Purple.

For the next Howe-era album, 1988's Dangerous Age, the band replaced Olsen with producer Terry Thomas, who got rid of most of the keyboards and returned the band to a guitar-driven sound. Thomas also added small amounts of keyboards as well as rhythm guitars and backing vocals and wrote most of the songs with the band. Dangerous Age fared better than its predecessor, spawning several MTV videos and the AOR hits "No Smoke Without A Fire" (#4), "One Night" (#9) and "Shake It Up" (#9, also No. 89 on the singles chart). The album went Gold and hit the Top 60. For the Dangerous Age tour, the band were augmented by Larry Oakes (keyboards, guitar), who had also played with Foreigner. Price and Oakes left at the conclusion of the tour.

The band's next album, Holy Water written mostly by Brian Howe and Terry Thomas released in June 1990 on Atco, also produced by Thomas, was enormously successful both critically and commercially, attaining Top 40 and Platinum status by selling more than one million copies. Holy Water was the band's first album on the Atlantic subsidiary Atco Records. The album spun off the singles: "If You Needed Somebody" (#16), the title track "Holy Water" (#89) and "Walk Through Fire" (#28). "Holy Water" also hit No. 1 for two weeks on the AOR charts with "If You Needed Somebody" reaching No. 2. The album received significant radio airplay (five songs made the AOR charts in all) and spawned several video hits. Felix Krish played bass guitar on the CD while Paul Cullen was recruited for live shows. Mick Ralphs, who was taking care of personal and family matters, sat out for most of the Holy Water tour, although he did perform on the album. Ralphs was replaced on the road and in the videos by ex-Crawler guitarist Geoffrey Whitehorn. Ralphs returned later on during the tour and Whitehorn joined Procol Harum. Also joining at this time was ex-ASAP guitarist Dave "Bucket" Colwell as second guitarist. Heralded as one of the top 5 grossing tours of 1991, and supported by Damn Yankees, that year was one in which many other rock acts faced a downturn in concert attendance brought on by rising ticket prices and economic recession.

It was widely rumoured all summer that Howe and other members of the band, which he helped revive three years earlier, had been bickering over financial matters. Howe was rumoured to be leaving the band and ex-Kansas singer Steve Walsh was to take over for the remainder of the tour. Atlantic Records did not agree. Given the success of Holy Water and Howe's extraordinary vocal ability, he was asked to stay on. "Atlantic Records didn't want me to leave and they told me so," Howe recalled. "They didn't have much time either for Mick and Simon, and they promised me that they would cover me and look after me if I stayed in the band and wrote the songs. I don't know what that says about everything, but it was a very dysfunctional band. It really was. It wasn't a pleasure. It wasn't a happy band."

The final studio album of the Howe era, 1992's Here Comes Trouble, featured the Top 40 hit "How About That" (#38) and "This Could Be The One" (#87). The album went Gold. Before touring in support of Here Comes Trouble, the band added ex-Foreigner, Roxy Music and Small Faces bassist Rick Wills and Colwell, a protégé of Ralphs, was now a full-time member. The band recorded a live album, What You Hear Is What You Get: The Best of Bad Company on the Here Comes Trouble tour. The critically acclaimed album released in November 1993, featured live versions of hits from both the Rodgers and Howe eras of the band. Throughout his time in Bad Company, Howe occasionally played saxophone. Howe left the band in 1994.

== Solo ==
Howe released his first solo album, Tangled in Blue, in 1997 on Touchwood Records. It was re-released with one additional song under the name Touch in 2003 on MTM Music and Publishing.

Howe played a series of shows as part of an Iraq and Kuwait tour to entertain the troops overseas in March 2010, one of which was the "Change of Command ceremony" in Baghdad on 12 March 2010. The mini-tour was funded (and supported) by the US Forces Iraq/Entertainment Branch.

In late February 2010, Howe's second solo album, The Circus Bar, was released in United Kingdom to mostly positive reviews and after its subsequent North American release, has become, according to one American review, "one of the best solo albums of the past 25 years." The album is now available on iTunes in most countries.

In November 2011, Howe released the EP Emotions featuring "Christmas". "The song just came from trying to imagine how some people during Christmas end up alone," he says. "I actually wrote it during a period where I spent Christmas alone. And I thought, 'Oh, I don't like this very much.'"

In October 2016, Howe began recording acoustic renditions of Bad Company classics, some of Brian's solo material and other songs for a future album titled Porch Sessions.

On 30 June 2017 the first new studio recording from Brian was released worldwide, on his own label, Howe's Business. 'Hot Tin Roof' has already been gaining critical acclaim and garnering airplay on classic rock outlets. To coincide with the release, a tour of Europe, the first for Brian since 1993, was announced with the first show in Sweden on 21 September. The tour will take in stops in Sweden, Norway, Germany, France and Italy, in anticipation of an even more extensive tour in 2018.

The line-up of his solo band was:

- Brian Howe – Lead vocals
- Paul Warren – Guitar / Backing vocals
- Christopher Turnbow – Guitar / Backing vocals
- Abe White – Bass / Backing vocals
- Rick Brothers – Drums / Backing vocals

A previously unreleased song "Going Home" was released on 29 June 2020. "This is one of the last songs Brian wrote and recorded and, as it turns out, sadly it was very prophetic," said Howe's manager, Paul Easton. "The song really touched everybody in the office when they first heard it. And today, as we work on the release, it is still a tough one to listen to."

== Death ==
Howe died of cardiac arrest on 6 May 2020 while en route to a hospital in Florida, aged 66. He had a history of heart illnesses including a heart attack in 2017. Howe was survived by his sister Sandie and her husband, his three children, and his three grandchildren.

== Discography ==
=== Solo ===
- Tangled in Blue (1997)
- Touch (2003)
- Circus Bar (2010)

=== Singles ===
- "Hot Tin Roof" (2017)
- "Going Home" (2020)

=== EPs ===
- Emotions (2011)

=== with Ted Nugent ===
- Penetrator (1984)

=== with Bad Company ===
- Fame and Fortune (1986)
- Dangerous Age (1988)
- Holy Water (1990)
- Here Comes Trouble (1992)
- What You Hear Is What You Get: The Best of Bad Company (1993)

=== with White Spirit ===
- Right or Wrong (2022, posthumously)
