= Verden Allen =

British organ player and vocalist

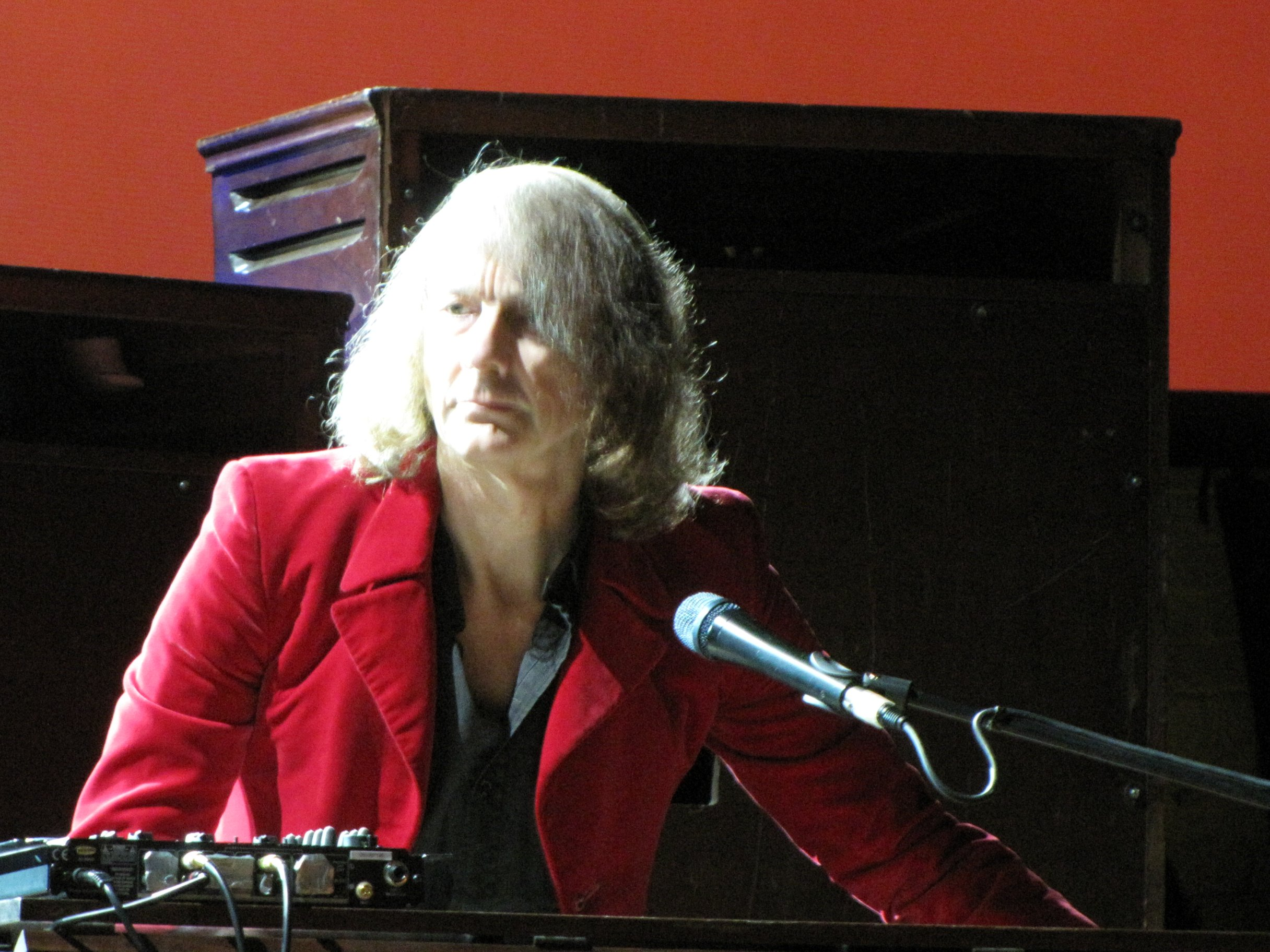
- Allen performing at a Mott the Hoople reunion gig, Hammersmith Apollo, October 2009

Background information
- Born: Terence Allen; 26 May 1944 (age 82)
- Origin: Crynant, Wales
- Genres: Rock; Hard rock; Glam rock
- Occupations: Musician, singer-songwriter
- Instruments: Organ; vocals
- Years active: 1966–present
- Labels: Chrysalis; Island; Spinit; Angel Air
- Formerly of: The Inmates; Mott the Hoople; Cheeks; Thunderbuck Ram; Soft Ground

Verden Allen (born Terence Allen, 26 May 1944) is a Welsh organist and vocalist best known as a founding member of 1970s rock band Mott the Hoople. Before that band formed, he had in the mid-1960s been in a rhythm and blues cover band called The Inmates and recorded with Jimmy Cliff.

He left Mott after their breakthrough 1972 album All The Young Dudes. He is featured singing on a few Mott songs, including the demo version of "Nightmare", released on the (reissue) of the album Mott, as well as "Soft Ground" on All the Young Dudes. After he left Mott, he joined up with future Pretenders members James Honeyman-Scott and Martin Chambers in a band called The Cheeks. They disbanded in 1976 after failing to get a record deal. On his 1999 solo album, For Each Other, Allen played all the instruments, and the album was released by Angel Air Records, who reissued all the classic Mott the Hoople albums during the early 2000s.

In January 2009, it was confirmed that Allen and the other original members of Mott the Hoople would reform for two 40th anniversary reunion concerts in October 2009. This was later expanded to cover five dates, all at the Hammersmith Apollo. A further five-date tour followed, in November 2013, covering dates across the UK.
