= Mott the Hoople discography =

- Studio albums: 7
- Live albums: 9
- Compilation albums: 13
- Singles: 15
- B-sides: 16

The rock band Mott the Hoople have released seven studio albums, nine live albums, thirteen compilation albums and 15 singles. The discographies of Mott and British Lions are also included because they are a continuation of Mott the Hoople (without founding members Mick Ralphs and Ian Hunter, but featuring members of the original line-up of Mott the Hoople).

== Albums ==
=== Studio albums ===
==== As Mott the Hoople ====
Year	Title	Peak chart positions						Certifications
Year	Title	UK	AUS	CAN	NOR	SWE	US	Certifications
1969	Mott the Hoople: Released: November 1969; Label: UK Island/US Atlantic; Format:	66	—	—	—	—	185	
1970	Mad Shadows: Released: September 1970; Label: UK Island/US Atlantic; Format:	48	—	—	—	—	—	
1971	Wildlife: Released: March 1971; Label: UK Island/US Atlantic; Format:	44	—	—	—	—	—	
1971	Brain Capers: Released: November 1971; Label: UK Island/US Atlantic; Format:	—	—	—	—	—	—	
1972	All the Young Dudes: Released: 8 September 1972; Label: UK CBS/US Columbia; Format:	21	61	—	—	—	89	
1973	Mott: Released: 20 July 1973; Label: UK CBS\US Columbia; Format:	7	57	43	—	—	35	UK: Silver
1974	The Hoople: Released: 29 March 1974; Label: UK CBS\US Columbia; Format:	11	—	28	11	4	28	UK: Gold
"—" denotes releases that did not chart.

==== As Mott ====
Year	Title	Peak chart positions	
Year	Title	UK	US
1975	Drive On: Released: 12 September 1975; Label: CBS Records International; Format:	35	160
1976	Shouting and Pointing: Released: 7 June 1976; Label: CBS Records International; Format:	70	180

==== As British Lions ====
Year	Title	Peak chart positions		
Year	Title	UK	US	CAN
1978	British Lions: Released: 10 February 1978; Label: Vertigo Records; Format:	78	83	80
1980	Trouble with Women: Released: 6 June 1980; Label: Cherry Red Records; Format:	80	199	—

=== Live albums ===
Year	Title	Peak chart positions			
Year	Title	UK	CAN	SWE	US
1974	Live	32	51	8	23
1996	Original Mixed Up Kids – The BBC Recordings	—	—	—	—
2000	Rock 'n' Roll Circus Live	—	—	—	—
2001	Two Miles from Live Heaven	—	—	—	—
2004	Mott the Hoople Live – 30th Anniversary Edition	—	—	—	—
2006	Live Fillmore West	—	—	—	—
2007	Fairfields Halls, Live 1970	—	—	—	—
2008	In Performance 1970-1974	—	—	—	—
2009	Live at HMV Hammersmith Apollo 2009	—	—	—	—
"—" denotes releases that did not chart.

=== Compilation albums ===
Year	Title	Peak chart positions	
Year	Title	UK	US
1974	Rock and Roll Queen	—	112
1976	Greatest Hits	—	—
1979	Shades of Ian Hunter: The Ballad of Ian Hunter and Mott the Hoople	—	—
1979	Two Miles from Heaven	—	—
1981	All the Way from Memphis	—	—
1988	The Collection: Ian Hunter & Mott the Hoople	—	—
1990	Walkin' with a Mountain	—	—
1992	London to Memphis	—	—
1993	Ballad of Mott the Hoople – A Retrospective	—	—
1997	Super Hits	—	—
1998	All the Young Dudes: The Anthology	—	—
2001	A Tale of Two Cities	—	—
2005	Family Anthology	—	—
"—" denotes releases that did not chart.

== Singles ==
Year	Title	Peak chart positions				Album
Year	Title	US	GER	UK	CAN	Album
1969	"Rock and Roll Queen"	—	—	—	—	Mott the Hoople
1970	"Thunderbuck Ram" (Note: released in France and Japan)	—	—	—	—	Mad Shadows
1971	"Midnight Lady"	—	—	—	—	Non-album single
1971	"Downtown"	—	—	—	—	Non-album single
1972	"All the Young Dudes"	37	—	3	31	All the Young Dudes
1972	"Lay Down" (Note: released in the Netherlands)	—	—	—	—	Wildlife
1973	"One of the Boys"	96	—	—	—	All the Young Dudes
1973	"Sweet Jane"	—	—	—	—	All the Young Dudes
1973	"Honaloochie Boogie"	—	—	12	—	Mott
1973	"All the Way from Memphis"	—	—	10	—	Mott
1973	"Roll Away the Stone"	—	25	8	—	The Hoople
1974	"The Golden Age of Rock 'n' Roll"	96	—	16	64	The Hoople
1974	"Foxy, Foxy"	—	—	33	—	Non-album single
1974	"Saturday Gigs"	—	—	41	—	Non-album single
1974	"All the Young Dudes" (Live)	—	—	—	—	Live
1975	"Monte Carlo" (As 'Mott')	—	—	—	—	Drive On
1975	"By Tonight" (As 'Mott')	—	—	—	—	Drive On
1976	"Shouting and Pointing" (As 'Mott')	—	—	—	—	Shouting and Pointing
1978	"One More Chance to Run" (As 'British Lions')	—	—	—	—	British Lions
"—" denotes releases that did not chart.
