= Greatest Hits (Mott the Hoople album) =

Greatest hits album by Mott the Hoople
- Released: 1 March 1976
- Recorded: 1972–1974
- Studio: Various
- Genre: Glam rock
- Length: 39:39 (1976 original edition); 46:10 (2003 CD reissue edition)
- Label: Columbia
- Producer: Mott the Hoople

Mott the Hoople chronology
The Hoople (1974)	Greatest Hits (1976)	Two Miles from Heaven (1980)

Greatest Hits is a compilation album by English rock band Mott the Hoople. It was released on 1 March 1976 through Columbia Records.

== Release and reception ==
Professional ratings
Review scores
Source	Rating
Allmusic	2.5/5 stars

Dave Thompson of AllMusic wrote,

"A petty little package this is, and no mistake. It was no secret, of course, that the end of Mott the Hoople was a rancorous, bitter affair. But while former frontman Ian Hunter was igniting his solo career with an album of songs which could have been Mott's, did his erstwhile bandmates truly have nothing better to occupy their time with than compiling a collection which not only skews all that they really achieved during three years of hit..."

== Track listing ==
Side one
No.	Title	Writer(s)	Original Album	Length
1.	"All the Way from Memphis"	Ian Hunter	Mott, 1973	3:25
2.	"Honaloochie Boogie"	Hunter	Mott	2:43
3.	"Hymn for the Dudes"	Verden Allen; Hunter	Mott	5:23
4.	"Born Late '58"	Overend Watts	The Hoople, 1974	3:59
5.	"All the Young Dudes"	David Bowie	All of the Young Dudes, 1972	3:33

Side two
No.	Title	Writer(s)	Original Album	Length
1.	"Roll Away the Stone"	Hunter	The Hoople	3:13
2.	"Ballad of Mott"	Hunter; Dale Griffin; Watts; Mick Ralphs; Allen	Mott	5:22
3.	"The Golden Age of Rock 'n' Roll"	Hunter	The Hoople	3:26
4.	"Foxy, Foxy"	Hunter	non-album single, 1974	3:30
5.	"Saturday Gigs"	Hunter	non-album single, 1974	4:20

- Sides one and two were combined as tracks 1–10 on CD reissues.

2003 CD reissue – Bonus tracks
No.	Title	Writer(s)	Original Album	Length
11.	"Sweet Jane"	Lou Reed	All the Young Dudes	4:21
12.	"One of the Boys"	Hunter; Ralphs	All the Young Dudes	2:50

== Personnel ==
Mott the Hoople

- Ian Hunter – piano, acoustic guitar, vocals
- Overend Watts – bass guitar, rhythm guitar, vocals
- Dale Griffin – drums, vocals
- Morgan Fisher – piano, synthesizer (6, 9, 10)
- Mick Ralphs – electric guitar, rhythm guitar, organ
- Ariel Bender – electric guitar

Additional musicians

- David Bowie – producer on "All the Young Dudes"
- Mick Ronson – electric guitar (10)
- Thunderthighs – backing vocals (3, 6)
- Sue & Sunny – backing vocals (8, 9)

Design

- Norman Seeff – photography
- Norman Moore – sleeve design
