= London to Memphis =

Album by Mott the Hoople

Compilation album by Mott the Hoople
- Released: 1992
- Genre: Glam rock
- Length: 44:47
- Label: Sony Music

London to Memphis is a compilation album by Mott the Hoople. It was released in 1992 by Sony Music Distribution as both a cassette and a CD.

== Track listing ==
All tracks are written by Ian Hunter, except where noted

No.	Title	Writer(s)	Length
1.	"All the Way from Memphis"		4:57
2.	"Sweet Jane"	Lou Reed	4:18
3.	"Honaloochie Boogie"		2:41
4.	"Jerkin' Crocus"		3:59
5.	"Ready for Love/After Lights"	Mick Ralphs	6:45
6.	"All the Young Dudes"	David Bowie	3:31
7.	"Ballad of Mott the Hoople" (26th March 1972, Zürich)	Dale Griffin, Ian Hunter, Mick Ralphs, Pete Overend Watts	5:22
8.	"The Golden Age of Rock 'n' Roll"		3:24
9.	"Roll Away the Stone"		3:06
10.	"One of the Boys"	Hunter, Ralphs	6:44
Total length:			44:47
