= In Performance 1970–1974 =

Box set by Mott the Hoople
- Released: 2008
- Recorded: 1970–1974
- Genres: Glam rock, hard rock
- Label: Angel Air

Mott the Hoople chronology
Fairfield Halls, Live 1970 (2007)	In Performance 1970–1974 (2008)	Old Records Never Die: The Mott the Hoople/Ian Hunter Anthology (2008)

In Performance 1970–1974 is a four CD box-set of live Mott the Hoople concerts between 1970 and 1974. Playing were the original members of the band and also, the new members incorporated in 1973 after Verden Allen's May departure, and Mick Ralph's August departure.

The sessions to convert and remaster the original tapes were supervised by drummer Dale Griffin. The result was this box-set published by Angel Air Records in 2008.

These sets of live recordings show the original band, as well as the later Bender/Fisher line-up. It captures the best of those releases and puts them together in chronological order, allowing the listener to follow the group's journey from the "Liverpool Docks to the Hollywood Bowl".

== Track listing ==
=== CD1: Fairfield Hall, Croydon 1970 ===
1. "Ohio" (Neil Young) (*)
2. "No Wheels to Ride" (Ian Hunter)
3. "Rock 'n' Roll Queen" (Mick Ralphs)
4. "Thunderbuck Ram" (Ralphs)
5. "When My Mind's Gone" (Hunter)
6. "Keep a Knockin'" (Richard Penniman) (**)
7. "You Really Got Me" (Ray Davies)

Bonus Tracks: The Konserthuset, Stockholm, Sweden 1971

1. "Long Red" (Leslie West, Felix Pappalardi, Ventura, Landsberg)
2. "The Original Mixed-Up Kid" (Hunter)
3. "Walking With a Mountain" (Hunter)
4. "Laugh At Me" (Sonny Bono)
5. "Thunderbuck Ram" (Ralphs)

(*) Includes band introduction. (**) Includes parts of "I Got a Woman", "What I'd Say" and "Whole Lotta Shakin' Goin' On" (Not credited on the box).

=== CD2: The Tower Theatre, Philadelphia 1972 ===
1. "Introduction / Jupiter from the Planets" (from Holst's Planet Suite)
2. "Jerkin' Crocus" (Hunter)
3. "Sucker" (Hunter)
4. "Hymn for the Dudes" (Hunter)
5. "Ready for Love" (Ralphs) (***)
6. "Sweet Jane" (Lou Reed)
7. "Sea Diver" (Hunter)
8. "Sweet Angeline" (Hunter)
9. "One of the Boys" (Hunter, Ralphs)
10. "Midnight Lady" (Hunter, Ralphs)
11. "All the Young Dudes" (David Bowie)
12. "Honky Tonk Women" (Mick Jagger, Keith Richards)

(***) Includes "After Lights" (Not credited on the box)

=== CD3: Live Heaven - USA Tours 1971–1973 and demos ===
1. "No Wheels to Ride" (Hunter)
2. "Whisky Women" (Ralphs)
3. "Walkin' With a Mountain, includes: Jumping Jack Flash & Satisfaction" (Hunter, Jagger / Richards)
4. "It'll Be Me" (Jack Clement)
5. "Angel of Eight Avenue" (Hunter)
6. "Drivin' Sister" (Hunter, Ralphs)
7. "All the Young Dudes" (Bowie)
8. "All The Way from Memphis" (Hunter)
9. "Sweet Angeline" (Hunter)
10. "Death May Be Your Santa Claus" (wild and rude mix) (Verden Allen, Hunter)
11. "The Ballad of Billy Joe" (demo) (Charlie Rich)
12. "If Your Heart Lay With the Rebel (would you cheer the underdog?)" (demo) (Cyril / Dora Ward / Charles Ward)
13. "It Would Be a Pleasure" (demo) (Ralphs)

=== CD4: Live Heaven II - USA Tour 1974 ===
1. "American Pie" (Don McLean) (***)
2. "The Golden Age of Rock 'n' Roll" (Hunter)
3. "Sucker" (Hunter)
4. "Roll Away the Stone & Sweet Jane" (Hunter, Lou Reed)
5. "Rest in Peace" (Hunter, Watts, Griffin)
6. "Here Comes the Queen" (Luther Grosvenor)
7. "One of the Boys" (Hunter, Ralphs)
8. "Born Late '58" (Peter Watts)
9. "Hymn of the Dudes" (Allen, Hunter)
10. "Marionette" (Hunter)
11. "Drivin' Sister, includes: Crash Street Kidds & Violence" (Hunter, Ralphs)
12. "All The Way from Memphis" (Hunter)
13. "All the Young Dudes" (Bowie, Columbia Records, 'All the Young Dudes' outer sleeve)

(***) Acoustic first part only

== Personnel from 1970 to May 1973 ==
CSs 1 & 2 and tracks 1–5 & 10–13 of CD3

- Ian Hunter - lead vocals, piano
- Pete "Overend" Watts - bass, vocals
- Mick Ralphs - lead guitar, vocals
- Verden Allen - organ, vocals
- Dale Griffin - drums, vocals

== Personnel from August 1973 to 1974 ==
CD 4 and tracks 6–9 CD3

- Ian Hunter - lead vocals, piano
- Ariel Bender - guitar, vocals
- Peter Watts - bass, vocals
- Morgan Fisher - piano, synth, vocals
- Blue Weaver - Hammond organ
- Dale Griffin - drums, vocals
- Stan Tippins - power vocals (ATYD)
