= Two Miles from Heaven =

Two Miles From Heaven

Compilation album by Mott the Hoople
- Released: 1980
- Recorded: 1969–1972
- Genre: Rock
- Length: 45:31 (German vinyl), 55:26 (CD)
- Label: Island and Angel Air (reissue)
- Producer: Dale "Buffin" Griffin

Mott the Hoople chronology
Live (1974)	Two Miles From Heaven (1980)	All the Young Dudes: The Anthology (1998)

Two Miles From Heaven is a compilation album of tracks recorded by British rock band Mott the Hoople during their period with Island Records from 1969 to 1972. It features the original band line-up of Ian Hunter (vocals, piano, guitar), Mick Ralphs (guitar, vocals), Peter Watts (bass guitar, vocals), Dale Griffin (drums) and Verden Allen (organ). Incomplete tracks from original sessions were supplemented by overdubs of vocals, keyboards (by later Mott the Hoople and Mott member Morgan Fisher) and guitar (including contributions from Mott guitarist Ray Majors).

Of significance to followers of the group were the inclusion of alternative versions of extant Mott the Hoople songs (a vocal version of "You Really Got Me", the discarded mix of "Thunderbuck Ram" and early demo tapes of songs that were later recorded for their All the Young Dudes album once the band had left Island and signed to Columbia Records: "One of the Boys", "Ride on the Sun" (better known as "Sea Diver") and "Black Scorpio" (Momma's Little Jewel). "Until I'm Gone" was an otherwise unreleased Ralphs track.

The initial vinyl release was on Island's German label (202 429-270), in 1980, but it has subsequently been re-released on Angel Air SJPCD 161 in 2003 with additional bonus tracks.

== Track listing (Original German vinyl issue) ==
1. "You Really Got Me" (Ray Davies) 3.05
2. "Road to Birmingham" (Ian Hunter) 3.28
3. "Thunderbuck Ram" (Mick Ralphs) 4.40
4. "Going Home" (Ralphs) 2:54
5. "Little Christine" (Ralphs) 3.06
6. "Keep A-Knockin'" (Richard Penniman) 3.18
7. "Black Hills" (Ralphs) 1.27
8. "Black Scorpio" (Hunter, Peter "Overend" Watts) 3.30
9. "One of the Boys" (Ralphs, Hunter) 4.15
10. "Till I'm Gone" (Ralphs) 3:10
11. "Growin' Man Blues" (Hunter) 2.44
12. "Ride On the Sun" (Hunter) 3.34
13. "Surfin' U.K." (Ralphs) 2.32
14. "Ill Wind Blowing" (Hunter) 3.53

== Track listing (2003 re-issue) ==
1. "You Really Got Me" (Ray Davies) 3.05
2. "Road to Birmingham" (Ian Hunter) 3.28
3. "Thunderbuck Ram" (Mick Ralphs) 4.40
4. "Going Home" (Ralphs) 2:54
5. "Little Christine" (Ralphs) 3.06
6. "Keep a Knockin'" (Richard Penniman) 3.18
7. "Black Hills" (Ralphs) 1.27
8. "Movin' On" (Ralphs) 2.42
9. "Ride On the Sun" (Hunter) 3.34
10. "Growin' Man Blues" (Hunter) 2.44
11. "Till I'm Gone" (Ralphs) 3.10
12. "One of the Boys" (Ralphs, Hunter) 4.15
13. "Surfin' U.K." (Ralphs) 2.32
14. "Black Scorpio" (Hunter, Peter "Overend" Watts) 3.30
15. "Ill Wind Blowing" (Hunter) 3.48
16. "The Debt" (Hunter) 4.12
17. "Downtown" (Danny Whitten, Neil Young) 3.01
