= Live (Mott the Hoople album) =

Live album by Mott the Hoople
- Released: November 1974
- Recorded: Hammersmith Odeon, 14 December 1973 and Uris Theatre, Broadway, 8 and 9 May 1974
- Length: 53:48
- Labels: CBS (UK), Columbia (US)
- Producer: Dale "Buffin" Griffin,

Mott the Hoople chronology
The Hoople (1974)	Live (1974)	Drive On (1975)

Professional ratings
Review scores
Source	Rating
Allmusic ('74 LP)	3/5 stars
Allmusic ('04 CDs)	4.5/5 stars

Live is a 1974 album by British band Mott the Hoople recorded during their debut US performance at the Uris Theater (Gershwin) on Broadway in Manhattan, New York City, United States, with Queen as the opening act, and at London's Hammersmith Odeon. A remastered and expanded 30th Anniversary Edition was released by Sony BMG on the Columbia label (516051). The release of the album in its original form in 1974 coincided with the announcement of the band's demise and it was, therefore, their final release. It was a single disc album in its original format but the addition of thirteen extra tracks has seen it expand to a double CD package.

The original release peaked at No. 32 in the UK Albums Chart. It was the band's most successful album in the USA, reaching number 23.

== Track listing ==
=== Original LP ===
Side A (Broadway)

1. "All the Way from Memphis" (Hunter) – 5:05
2. "Sucker" (Hunter, Ralphs, Watts) – 6:06
3. "Rest in Peace" (Griffin, Hunter, Watts) – 5:57
4. "All the Young Dudes" (David Bowie) – 3:49
5. "Walkin' With A Mountain" (Hunter) – 5:02

Side B (Hammersmith)

1. "Sweet Angeline" (Hunter) – 7:03
2. "Rose" (Griffin, Hunter, Ralphs, Watts) – 4:46
3. "Jerkin' Crocus" / "One of the Boys" / "Rock & Roll Queen" / "Get Back" / "Whole Lotta Shakin' Goin' On" / "Violence" (Sunny David, Hunter, John Lennon, Paul McCartney, Ralphs, Dave Williams) – 16:00

=== 30th Anniversary Edition 2 CD set (2004) ===
CD 1 - Broadway

1. Intro - "Jupiter" from The Planets (Holst) – 0:46
2. "American Pie"/ "The Golden Age of Rock 'n' Roll" (McLean / Hunter) – 4:16
3. "Sucker" (Hunter, Ralphs, Watts) – 5:59
4. "Roll Away the Stone" / "Sweet Jane" (Hunter / Reed) – 3:52
5. "Rest in Peace" (Griffin, Hunter, Watts) – 6:01
6. "All The Way From Memphis" (Hunter) – 5:02
7. "Born Late '58" (Watts) – 4:51
8. "One of the Boys" (Hunter, Ralphs) – 5:32
9. "Hymn for the Dudes" (Allen, Hunter) – 5:46
10. "Marionette" (Hunter) – 5:04
11. "Drivin' Sister" / "Crash Street Kidds" / "Violence" (Hunter, Ralphs) – 9:06
12. "All The Young Dudes" (Bowie) – 3:49
13. "Walking with a Mountain" (Hunter) – 4:54

CD 2 - Hammersmith

1. Intro - "Jupiter" from The Planets (Holst) – 0:46
2. "Drivin' Sister" (Hunter, Ralphs) – 3:51
3. "Sucker" (Hunter, Ralphs, Watts) – 6:03
4. "Sweet Jane" (Reed) – 5:10
5. "Sweet Angeline" (Hunter) – 6:47
6. "Rose" (Buffin, Hunter, Ralphs, Watts) – 4:42
7. "Roll Away The Stone" (Hunter) – 3:31
8. "All The Young Dudes" (Bowie) – 3:53
9. "Jerkin' Crocus" / "One of the Boys" / "Rock 'n' Roll Queen" / "Get Back" / "Whole Lotta Shakin' Goin On" / "Violence" (David, Hunter, Lennon, McCartney, Ralphs, Williams) – 16.16
10. "Walking with a Mountain" (Hunter) – 9:09

== Personnel ==
Mott the Hoople

- Ian Hunter – vocals, rhythm guitar,
- Peter Overend Watts – bass guitar, vocals,
- Dale "Buffin" Griffin – drums, vocals,
- Ariel Bender – lead guitar, vocals,
- Morgan Fisher – piano, vocals

with:

- Blue Weaver – organ (U.S.)
- Mick Bolton – organ (UK)
- Stan Tippins – vocals on "All the Young Dudes"

Technical

- Fred Heller – executive producer
- Gary Klein – executive production supervision
- Bill Price, Gary Edwards – engineer (Island mobile studio)
- James Reeves – engineer (Record Plant mobile studio)
- Alan "Pinball Wizard" Harris, Bill Price, Gary Edwards, Peter Swettenham, Peter Wilson, Sean Milligan, Steve Nye – remix engineer
- Roslav Szaybo – sleeve design
- Dagmar Krajnc – front cover photography

== Charts ==
Chart (1974–75)	Peak position
Canada Top Albums/CDs (RPM)	51
UK Albums (Official Charts)	32
US Billboard 200	23
