= Drive On (album) =

Studio album by Mott
- Released: 12 September 1975
- Recorded: 1975
- Studio: Clearwell Castle, Gloucestershire, England
- Genre: Glam rock, rock and roll, hard rock
- Length: 42:22
- Label: CBS; Columbia
- Producer: Dale "Buffin" Griffin and Pete "Overend" Watts

Mott chronology
Live (1974)	Drive On (1975)	Shouting and Pointing (1976)

Singles from Drive On
- 1. "Monte Carlo" Released: 22 August 1975; 2. "By Tonight" Released: 31 October 1975; 3. "It Takes One To Know One" Released: 27 February 1976

Professional ratings
Review scores
Source	Rating
Allmusic	2/5 stars

Drive On is the debut album by British band Mott (formerly Mott the Hoople), released on 12 September 1975 by CBS in the UK and the Columbia label in the United States. It was their first album following their rebranding after original lead vocalist Ian Hunter departed the previous year alongside lead guitarist Mick Ronson, and hence marks the debut of two new members: lead guitarist Ray Majors and lead vocalist Nigel Benjamin.

The album features the singles "Monte Carlo / Shout It All Out" and "By Tonight / I Can Show You How It Is".

== Background ==
In the afterglow of The Hoople (1974), a live album Live was quickly released, after which the guitarist Ariel Bender was replaced by Mick Ronson. Mott The Hoople ended when vocalist/songwriter/rhythm guitarist Hunter left the group to form a solo band with Ronson.

In January 1975, Ray Majors and lead singer Nigel Benjamin were added to continue the group, which abbreviated its name to Mott. The new line-up consisted of Pete Watts, Dale Griffin and Morgan Fisher, along with guitarist Majors (formerly of Opal Butterfly, Hackensack, and brief stints with Andy Fraser and Frankie Miller) and the relatively unknown frontman Benjamin.

Watts did the lion's share of songwriting, supplemented by Griffin and Majors. Mott "arranged, produced and directed" Drive On, and it was co-engineered by Geoff Emerick.

This line-up released only one more album, Shouting and Pointing (1976), which was similarly a commercial disappointment compared to prior efforts, particularly in the United States. Drive On was also the last studio album by the band to reach the UK Albums Chart, peaking at number 45 on a one week stint in the charts.

A remastered version was released in CD format in 2006 by Wounded Bird Records in US.

== Track listing ==
All tracks written by Pete Overend Watts, except where noted.

=== LP version ===
==== Side one ====
1. "By Tonight" – 3:46
2. "Monte Carlo" – 4:35
3. "She Does It" – 3:26
4. "I'll Tell You Something" – 4:30
5. "Stiff Upper Lip" 4:30

==== Side two ====
6. "Love Now" – 2:45
7. "Apologies" (Ray Majors) – 0:50
8. "The Great White Wail" – 5:06
9. "Here We Are" – 5:25
10. "It Takes One To Know One" (Dale Griffin) – 4:30
11. "I Can Show You How It Is" (Watts, Griffin) – 2:30

== Personnel ==
Mott

- Nigel Benjamin – lead vocals (tracks 1–4, 7–11), backing vocals (tracks 5, 6, 11) acoustic guitar (track 7)
- Ray Majors – lead guitar (tracks 2–6, 8–11), rhythm guitar (tracks 2, 3, 10), slide guitar (track 1), backing vocals (track 10)
- Morgan Fisher – piano (tracks 1–6, 9–11), synthesizer (tracks 2–4, 8), organ (tracks 2, 4, 10), Davolisint (tracks 2, 8), electric piano (tracks 4, 8, 9, 11), backing vocals (tracks 2, 5, 10), glockenspiel (track 5), bass (track 8)
- Pete Overend Watts – bass (tracks 1–6, 9–11), rhythm guitar (tracks 1, 5, 6, 8, 10), backing vocals (track 2, 3), lead vocals (tracks 5, 6), acoustic guitar (track 9)
- Dale "Buffin" Griffin – drums (tracks 1–6, 8–11), backing vocals (tracks 2, 6)

Additional personnel

- Stan Tippins – backing vocals (tracks 2, 10, 11)

=== Technical ===
- Mott – producer, arranger
- Alan Harris, Geoff Emerick, Ron Fawcus – engineers
- Arun Chakraverty – mastering
- Art Direction – Roslav Szaybo
- Gary Edwards, Geoff Emerick, Pete Henderson – mixing engineers
- Mike Putland, Peter Lavery – photography
- Roger Bamber – photography [Front Cover]

== Charts ==
Chart (1975)	Peak position
UK Albums (OCC)	45
US Billboard 200	160
