= Mott (album) =

Studio album by Mott the Hoople
- Released: 20 July 1973
- Recorded: February–April 1973 (except track 1, 22 December 1972)
- Studios: AIR (London); Abbey Road (London)
- Genre: Glam rock
- Length: 43:00
- Labels: CBS (UK), Columbia (US)
- Producer: Mott the Hoople

Mott the Hoople chronology
Rock and Roll Queen (1972)	Mott (1973)	The Hoople (1974)

Singles from Mott
- 1. "Honaloochie Boogie" Released: 25 May 1973; 2. "All the Way from Memphis" Released: 31 August 1973

Alternative cover
- U.S. album cover

Mott is the sixth studio album by British rock band Mott the Hoople. It peaked at No. 7 in the UK Albums Chart. It is the last album to feature guitarist Mick Ralphs, and the first without organist Verden Allen; because of Allen's departure, most organ and other keyboard parts are played by Ralphs.

"All the Way from Memphis", an edited version of which was released as a single, received considerable airplay on U.S. radio and captured the band overseas fans, as well as reaching the UK Singles Chart.

== Packaging ==
The album featured different album covers in the U.K. and U.S., as well as remastered tracks on some editions. The U.S. cover featured a photo of the four band members with the word "MOTT" on it, with "Mott The Hoople" written in the O. The U.K. front cover featured an illustration based on a bust of Roman emperor Augustus, the band's name written in a typeface simultaneously evocative of a 1920s Art Deco font and the "Future Shock" font inspired by computer-readable punch cards. Initial copies had a gatefold sleeve with the Augustus image printed on a transparent plastic sheet. The emperor would appear again on the inner sleeve of The Hoople, the band's next and final album in both the United States and the United Kingdom. A remastered and expanded version was released by Sony's Columbia/Legacy imprint in the United States in 2006.

== Reception ==
In 2003, the album was ranked number 366 on Rolling Stone magazine's list of the 500 greatest albums of all time, and 370 in a 2012 revised list.

Professional ratings
Review scores
Source	Rating
AllMusic	5/5 stars
Christgau's Record Guide	A−
Pitchfork	7.4/10
PopMatters	favourable
Rolling Stone	very favourable

== Track listing ==
All songs written by Ian Hunter, except where indicated

=== Side one ===
1. "All the Way from Memphis" – 4:55
2. "Whizz Kid" – 3:05
3. "Hymn for the Dudes" (Verden Allen, Hunter) – 5:15
4. "Honaloochie Boogie" – 2:35
5. "Violence" (Hunter, Mick Ralphs) – 4:37

=== Side two ===
1. "Drivin' Sister" (Hunter, Ralphs) – 4:42
2. "Ballad of Mott the Hoople (26th March 1972, Zürich)" (Hunter, Dale "Buffin" Griffin, Peter Watts, Ralphs, Allen) – 5:40
3. "I’m a Cadillac / El Camino Dolo Roso" (Ralphs) – 7:40
4. "I Wish I Was Your Mother" – 4:41

LP track times from 1973 UK release (CBS 69038). Published track times for the US release (Columbia 32425) differ slightly.

=== 2006 CD release ===
1. "All the Way from Memphis" – 5:02
2. "Whizz Kid" – 3:25
3. "Hymn for the Dudes" (Allen, Hunter) – 5:24
4. "Honaloochie Boogie" – 2:43
5. "Violence" (Hunter, Ralphs) – 4:48
6. "Drivin' Sister" (Hunter, Ralphs) – 3:53
7. "Ballad of Mott the Hoople (26th March 1972, Zürich)" (Hunter, Griffin, Watts, Ralphs, Allen) – 5:24
8. "I’m a Cadillac / El Camino Dolo Roso" (Ralphs) – 7:50
9. "I Wish I Was Your Mother" – 4:52

==== Bonus tracks (2006 reissue) ====
10. "Rose" (Hunter, Ralphs, Watts, Griffin) – 3:56 B-side of "Honaloochie Boogie"; produced by Mott The Hoople
11. "Honaloochie Boogie" (Demo version) – 3:07
12. "Nightmare" (Demo) (Allen) – 3:36
13. "Drivin' Sister" (Hunter, Ralphs) – 4:30 Live 1973 at the Hammersmith Odeon; produced by Dale "Buffin" Griffin

== Personnel ==
=== Mott the Hoople ===
- Ian Hunter – lead vocals (All tracks except 8); piano (All tracks except 5); acoustic guitar (Tracks 3, 7, 9); rhythm guitar (Track 6); echo vamper (Tracks 7, 9); arrangements
- Mick Ralphs – lead guitar (All tracks except 9); backing vocals (Tracks 1, 2, 4); organ (Tracks 3, 5, 7, 8); Moogotron (Track 2); mandolins (Track 9); tambourine (track 1); acoustic guitar (Track 8); lead vocals (Track 8)
- Pete "Overend" Watts – bass guitar (All tracks); backing vocals (Track 4); fuzz bass (Track 8)
- Dale "Buffin" Griffin – drums (All tracks); backing vocals (Tracks 1, 3, 4, 6)

=== Additional personnel ===
- Paul Buckmaster – electric cello on "Honaloochie Boogie"
- Morgan Fisher – piano, synthesizer, backing vocals on "Drivin' Sister" (live)
- Mick Hince – bells on "I Wish I Was Your Mother"
- Andy Mackay – tenor saxophone on "All The Way from Memphis" and "Honaloochie Boogie"
- Graham Preskett – "insane" violin on "Violence"
- Thunderthighs (Karen Friedman, Dari Lalou, Casey Synge) – backing vocals on "Hymn for the Dudes"

=== Technical ===
- Dan Loggins – production supervisor
- Alan Harris, Bill Price, John Leckie – engineer
- Roslav Szaybo – art direction, design

== Charts ==
Chart (1973–74)	Peak position
Australian Albums (Kent Music Report)	57
Canada Top Albums/CDs (RPM)	43
UK Albums (Official Charts)	7
US Billboard 200	35

== Certifications ==
Region	Certification	Certified units/sales
United Kingdom (BPI)	Silver	60,000^{^}
^{^} Shipments figures based on certification alone.
