= Oriole Mine =

- Place
- Location within Kentucky Location within the United States
- Coordinates: 37°17′52″N 87°34′13″W
- Country: United States
- State: Kentucky
- County: Hopkins
- Elevation: 397 ft (121 m)
- Time zone: UTC-6 (Central (CST))
  - Summer (DST): UTC-5 (CST)
- GNIS feature ID: 508756

Oriole is a place located in Hopkins County, Kentucky, United States. The origin of the name Oriole is unknown, and the place never had a post office. Oriole is located four miles south-west of Madisonville, on Clear Creek.

Oriole might be mentioned in the Mott the Hoople song "All the Way from Memphis" written by Ian Hunter, as a result of guitarist Mick Ralphs' guitar being sent there by accident.

== Oriole mine ==
Oriole was home to the Oriole mine owned by the Bell and Zoller Coal and Mining Company. The roof of the mine was very weak shale. Roof bolting to secure the slate roof of the mine began in 1950. In 1952 a man was killed at the mine in a slate-fall. In 1954 a loader-operator was badly burned in a methane explosion at the mine. The output of the mine in 1959 was 747,313 tons of coal, making it one of the top ten coal-producing mines in Hopkins county. In April 1966 the mine was the site of an unsanctioned walk-out by workers striking in protest at the failure of the mine-owners to negotiate a new contract. In early August 1966 another strike began at the mine over seniority rights. Talks were held in Madisonville to resolve the strike. In 1967 the mine was the site of a major fire that began when a cable short-circuited in a bore-hole.

The mine was active through the 1950s and 1960s but closed in the early 1970s. In 2012 the Kentucky Division of Abandoned Mine Lands began planning the redevelopment of the former site of the mine.
