= British Lions (album) =

Studio album by British Lions
- Released: 10 February 1978
- Genre: Rock
- Length: 74:29
- Label: Vertigo/RSO
- Producer: British Lions

British Lions chronology
Shouting and Pointing (1976)	British Lions (1978)	Trouble with Women (1980)

Professional ratings
Review scores
Source	Rating
Allmusic	2.5/5 stars

British Lions is the 1978 debut album by British Lions, the band consisting mainly of members of Mott—Morgan Fisher, Ray Major, Pete Overend Watts and Dale Griffin—alongside singer/guitarist John Fiddler, previously of Medicine Head. It was released on the Vertigo label in the UK and the RSO label in the United States. A single "One More Chance to Run" b/w "Booster" was released by Vertigo in the UK to promote the album. In the US, the track, "Wild in the Streets" went to #87 on the Hot 100.

"One More Chance to Run" was covered by Joe Elliott's Down 'n' Outz on their 2010 album My ReGeneration.

== Track listing ==
All tracks composed by John Fiddler, except where noted.

Original release
No.	Title	Writer(s)	Length
1.	"One More Chance to Run"		3:36
2.	"Wild in the Streets"	Garland Jeffreys	3:00
3.	"Break This Fool"	Fiddler, Pete Watts	5:29
4.	"International Heroes"	Kim Fowley, Kerry Scott	4:19
5.	"Fork Talking Man"	Fiddler, Morgan Fisher, Watts	4:20
6.	"My Life's in Your Hands"		5:17
7.	"Big Drift Away"		8:29
8.	"Booster"	Fiddler, Watts	4:07
9.	"Eat the Rich"		3:40

Re-release (2000 Angel Air CD) bonus tracks
No.	Title	Writer(s)	Length
10.	"One More Chance to Run" (BBC John Peel Show session, May 10, 1978)		3:49
11.	"Break This Fool" (BBC John Peel Show session, May 10, 1978)	Fiddler, Watts	5:10
12.	"Wild in the Streets" (BBC John Peel Show session, May 10, 1978)	Jeffreys	3:23
13.	"Wild One" (live, recorded at Woods Club, Plymouth, Devon on April 12, 1978)		6:12
14.	"Eat the Rich: the Second Course" (demo)		3:52
15.	"Can't Get Over You" (demo)		3:05
16.	"Long Distance Love" (demo)		3:30
17.	"You Got Everything" (demo)		3:00

== Personnel ==
British Lions

- John Fiddler – lead vocals, rhythm guitar
- Ray Major – lead guitar; backing vocals (tracks 1, 3, 6–8), percussion (track 3)
- Morgan Fisher – piano, Hammond organ, Korg synthesizer, davolisint; slide glockenspiel and electric percussion (track 9)
- Pete Watts – bass; backing vocals (tracks 1, 3, 6–8), slide guitar (track 1)
- Dale "Buffin" Griffin – drums; backing vocals (tracks 2, 4, 5), percussion (track 3)

Additional personnel

- Stan Tippins — backing vocals (tracks 2, 4)

Technical

- Alan "Ghastly Toad" Douglas and Mick "School Bully" Glossop – recording
- Alan Schmidt – art direction

== Charts ==
Chart (1978)	Peak position
Canada Top Albums/CDs (RPM)	80
US Billboard 200	83
