= Graham Preskett =

British musician and composer (born 1948)

- Born: Graham Donald Harry Preskett; 26 December 1948 (age 77)
- Genres: Film score, rock, pop
- Occupations: Composer, musician
- Instruments: Piano, violin, fiddle, mandolin, banjo, harmonica, guitar
- Years active: 1970s–present
- Formerly of: Development
- Website: http://www.preskett.com/

Graham Donald Harry Preskett (born 26 December 1948) is a British composer and musician who has been active since the early 1970s. He appeared on the Mott the Hoople albums Mott (1973) and The Hoople (1974), playing violin on both, and arranging and conducting on the latter.

== Background ==
In his autobiography Snakes and Ladders (2016), Whitesnake guitarist Micky Moody wrote of their 1978 album Snakebite:

Also in the line-up was a multi-instrumentalist, who played almost everything, could write, read and arrange music like most of us write, read and arrange our names, and was a charming and funny man to boot.

— Micky Moody, Snakes and Ladders – My Autobiography: A Rock 'n' Roll Odyssey as Whitesnake's Guitarist

== Career ==
Graham Preskett was a member of the group Development that Colin Young had formed after he left The Foundations in late 1970. The group would alternate between the names of The Foundations and Development.

The 17 January issue Crónica ran the group's picture on page 13 when they arrived in Argentina. It also gave the line up as Graham Donald Preskett on violin, Christopher Smith on drums, Roger Cawkwell on saxophone and flute, Colin Young on lead vocals, Jean Alain Roussel on organ and piano and Estephen Bingham (bass). Also with them was Rodney Harrod the manager, and Philip Peverley. Juan D'Arjenzo appeared to be their technician. It was also made known that the group was changing their name to Development.

== Selected works ==
Preskett is credited on the following releases:

- Mott – Mott the Hoople (1973), violin
- The Hoople – Mott the Hoople (1974), arranger, conductor, violin, tubular bells, orchestration
- Streets... – Ralph McTell (1975), arranger, string arrangements
- Afternoon Sunshine – Edwin Starr (1977), fiddle
- City to City – Gerry Rafferty (1978), vocals, mandolin, violin, fiddle, keyboards, string arrangements, brass arrangements, string machine
- "Baker Street" – Gerry Rafferty (1978), string arrangements
- Snakebite – Whitesnake (1978), violin
- "Try Anything Once" – Alan Parsons (1993), fiddle, violin, mandolin
- Something to Talk About score (1995; with Hans Zimmer), primary artist, composer
- Musical Tour of Scotland (1995), arranger, piano, violin, producer
- The Da Vinci Code soundtrack (2006; with Hans Zimmer), arranger, composer
