= Diary of a Rock'n'Roll Star =

Memoir by musician Ian Hunter

Diary of a Rock'n'Roll Star is a 1974 book by the Ian Hunter about the US tour of the British band Mott the Hoople in late 1972.

== Background ==
Diary of a Rock'n'Roll Star was the Ian Hunter's written-as-it-happened account of Mott the Hoople's 5 week tour of the United States in November-December 1972. The book was published 18 months later in June 1974, just as Hunter, the band's lead singer and piano player, was leaving the band to embark on a solo career. It was based on a journal kept by Hunter during the tour.

== About ==
The book chronicles the endless traveling, hotels, sound checks, performances and, notably, strips away the glittering facade of the rock star that the music industry PR machine would have music fans believe.

Hunter delivers a distinctly British perspective as he encounters the diverse American cultural landscape. Already in his 30s and a show biz veteran, Hunter offers not only the usual clichés, but also mature, hard-won insights into the rock game. As if aware of his own future career arc, Hunter warns, "It may look flashy, but it's over and you are finished before you know it - if you aren't already broken by one thing it will be another... The rock business is a dirty business full stop."

With Mott the Hoople sharing Tony Defries' MainMan Management "family" with rising superstar David Bowie and riding a Top 5 hit song ("All The Young Dudes" penned by Bowie himself), the book also offers an inside look at Bowie circa late 1972. When their paths cross, as on November 29 in Philadelphia before 2,000 fans, Bowie would join the band on stage to sing harmony on "Dudes".

Hunter comments, "David looks tired, but great... he's the only star I know who regularly suffers from malnutrition... Innocence, cruelty, the nearness yet the distance, all the qualities of the star he is — only he knows what he pays for this coveted title, but I've sometimes caught glimpses of the sadness".

== Critical reception ==
Out of print for years and difficult to find, Diary achieved cult status.

Eventually, Hunter's wife Trudi bought the rights as a surprise for her husband.

== Reprint ==
A near-identical Diary was re-published in 1996 by Independent Music Press with a new foreword by Andrew Collins. A review in the October 1996 issue of Q magazine ventured that it "may well be the best rock book ever".
