= One of the Boys (Mott the Hoople song) =

1972 song by Mott the Hoople

Single by Mott the Hoople

from the album All the Young Dudes
- B-side: "Sucker"
- Released: January 1973 (US)
- Recorded: 14 May 1972
- Length: 2:50 (single edit); 6:46 (album version)
- Label: Columbia Records
- Songwriter(s): Ian Hunter/Mick Ralphs
- Producer(s): David Bowie

Mott the Hoople singles chronology
"All the Young Dudes" (1972)	"One of the Boys" (1973)	"Sweet Jane" (1973)

"One of the Boys" is a song written by Ian Hunter and Mick Ralphs that was released on Mott the Hoople's 1972 album All the Young Dudes. It was also released as the b-side of the "All the Young Dudes" single in some countries. It was released as a single in its own right in the US.

== Lyrics and music ==
According to rock historian Joe Harrington, the lyrics of "One of the Boys" celebrate the singers' hooliganism in behaving contrary to social norms and joining a rock group. Harrington regards this, and similarly themed songs that share an "unembellished" sound such as "Cum on Feel the Noize", "Mama Weer All Crazee Now" and "Borstal Boys" as being influenced by the Rolling Stones and being an important step towards punk rock. The Clash historian Randal Doane noted the song lyric's "manneristic self-referentiality", similar to the Rolling Stones' "Torn and Frayed" and John Lennon's "God", a style the Clash used in some of their early songs. Allmusic critic Dave Thompson cited the line "I borrowed [a] Gibson just to show them, and now I'm in a rock'n'roll band, I don't wanna know them/If they want a Slade, they'd better go out and grow one" to illustrate that the song gives "a five-minute lesson in how to form a great group, and how to remain one as well." Thompson called the song "a magnificently anthemic rallying call which is at least as powerful, in its own way, as the better feted 'All the Young Dudes.'"

== Reception ==
Upon its release, Record World called it "an exciting rhythmic number with sensational lyrics and topBowie production." Rolling Stone critic Bud Scoppa said that "the playing off of a Keith Richards-style tense, ringing guitar against a power-chorded Led Zeppelin guitar-bass boom" "gets your attention." Billboard recommended the single.

Classic Rock History critic Brian Kachejian rated "One of the Boys" to be Mott the Hoople's 5th greatest song. Ultimate Classic Rock critic Michael Gallucci rated it as Mott the Hoople's 9th greatest song, saying that it is the "tightest link to [the band's] bluesy past" on the All the Young Dudes album. Allmusic critic Stephen Thomas Erlewine regarded it as one of Hunter's best songwriting efforts. Thompson called it "the quintessential Mott the Hoople rocker" Pitchfork critic Joe Tangari called it a "strong hard boogie tune."

== Single release ==
Producer David Bowie wanted "One of the Boys" to be the lead single from All the Young Dudes, but the band preferred to release the title track, which Bowie had written. In the US, "One of the Boys" was released as the follow-up single to "All the Young Dudes", which became a big hit. "One of the Boys" did not replicate its predecessor's success, stalling at No. 96 on the Billboard Hot 100.

== Legacy ==
"One of the Boys" was included on several of Mott the Hoople's compilation and live albums, such as the CD release of Greatest Hits, Live and In Performance 1970–1974.

The song was featured in an episode of the BBC Television drama series, Life on Mars.

After leaving Mott the Hoople, Ralphs joined the newly formed band Bad Company. He based the guitar riff for Bad Company's first single "Can't Get Enough" on that from "One of the Boys". "Can't Get Enough" proved to be a more successful single release for Bad Company than "One of the Boys" was for Mott the Hoople, reaching No. 5 on the Billboard Hot 100.
