= Thunderthighs =

British backing vocal group

- Origin: United Kingdom
- Years active: 1973–1977
- Past members: Karen Friedman; Dari Lalou; Casey Synge

Thunderthighs (also known as "Thunder Thighs") were a British backing vocal group, who released records in their own right.

== Career ==
The female trio, consisting of Karen Friedman, Dari Lalou (American) and Casey Synge, provided the backing vocals to Lou Reed's hit single, "Walk on the Wild Side" (from his 1972 Transformer album) which became a top 10 hit in the UK. It was around this vocal arrangement that singer-songwriter Lynsey de Paul wrote their first single, "Central Park Arrest", which reached number 30 in the UK Singles Chart in 1974. It also reached number 3 on the Radio Northsea Toppers 20, number 5 on the Swedish Poporama singles chart, number 24 on London's Capital Radio chart and number 25 on the Radio Luxembourg top thirty. The single received critical acclaim, being listed in the New Musical Express as one of the best singles released in 1974 in the End of Year Critic List. De Paul recorded her own version of the song which was released as the B-side to her hit single "No, Honestly" later that year. Dari Lallou performed all the speaking parts throughout the song, including "Book him" at the end, misheard at the time as being a similar sounding profanity and getting the record temporarily banned by the BBC, until it was re-voiced.

Further singles followed such as "Dracula's Daughter" (1974) (produced by Steve Rowland) that received a glowing review from Record and Popswop Mirror and reached number 16 on the Swedish Poporama single chart. The song was also included on the 1975 compilation album, Ripper! 20 Original Smash Hits. The trio changed label to EMI for their next single release "Stand Up and Cheer" and the Blue Inc label for their final single release "Loving You Ain't Easy", co-written by Dari Lallou Wynne. According to an interview with Karen Friedman, the trio also released "They'd Rather Be Making Money Than Making Love", another de Paul composed song, as a single in 1976.

An album was recorded, but was shelved at the time since further hits were not forthcoming, although it is now available at BR Music and on iTunes. The track listing is:-

1. "Central Park Arrest"
2. "Bronze Beach Hero"
3. "Dracula's Daughter"
4. "Great Male Robbery"
5. "Lady"
6. "Loving You Ain't Easy"
7. "Sally Wants a Red Dress"
8. "Shine Your Light on Me"
9. "So Fine"
10. "We've Got a Good Thing Going"
11. "Shake Sheik Shake"

They were, however, in demand and provided backing vocals for Mott the Hoople on the single version of their hit, "Roll Away the Stone" (although de Paul delivered the spoken bridge on the later The Hoople album version), and their 1974 single "Foxy, Foxy". Thunderthighs had already appeared on Mott the Hoople's earlier 1973 album, Mott, on the track "Hymn for the Dudes". The trio provided backing vocals for Mick Ronson at his show at London's Rainbow Theatre in February 1974.

They provided backing vocals for Elkie Brooks on two tracks on the 1975 original studio cast compilation album, Flash Fearless Versus The Zorg Women Parts 5 & 6. They also provided backing vocals for Maggie Bell on her 1974 U.S. tour that garnered positive reviews for Bell and for them. In 1981, they provided the backing vocals on "Solid Gold Easy Action", a cover version of the Marc Bolan song recorded and released by the group Department S.

In addition, Thunderthighs provided vocals for the following albums:

- Jonathan Kelly (Wait 'Til They Change The Backdrop) (1973)
- Jerry Lee Lewis (The Session) (1973)
- Go (Go) (1976)
- Shusha (Before the Deluge) (1975)
- John Verity (John Verity Band) (1974)
- Alquin (Nobody Can Wait Forever) (1975)
- The Crazy World of Arthur Brown (Lost Ears) (1976)
- Adrian Wagner (Instincts) (1977)
- Elephant's Memory (Angels Forever) (1974)

== Singles ==
- "Central Park Arrest" (June 1974) – Philips 6006 386 – UK singles chart – Number 30
- "Dracula's Daughter" (November 1974) – Philips 6006 413
- "Stand Up and Cheer" (1975) – EMI
- "Loving You Ain't Easy" (1981) – Blue Inc
