= Shouting and Pointing =

Studio album by Mott
- Released: 7 June 1976
- Recorded: February–March 1976
- Studio: The Manor Studio, Shipton-on-Cherwell, Oxfordshire, England
- Genre: Glam rock, rock and roll, hard rock
- Length: 39:04
- Label: CBS; Columbia
- Producer: Mott, Eddie Kramer

Mott chronology
Drive On (1975)	Shouting and Pointing (1976)

Professional ratings
Review scores
Source	Rating
Allmusic	1/5 stars

Shouting and Pointing is the second and final album by British band Mott, released in 1976.

Despite favourable nods by critics in the music press, Shouting and Pointing was the only Mott album to not chart at all in either the U.S. or U.K. Following that disappointment, the band was dropped by CBS Records. Singer Benjamin left, to be replaced by ex-Medicine Head band singer/guitarist John Fiddler, and the band changed their name to British Lions, just one year after the release of this album. Retrospective reception to the album is now negative.

== Track listing ==
=== Side one ===
1. "Shouting and Pointing" (Morgan Fisher, Pete Overend Watts) – 4:31
2. "Collision Course" (Watts) – 3:25
3. "Storm" (Fisher, Ray Major, Watts) – 5:31
4. "Career (No Such Thing as Rock 'n' Roll)" (Nigel Benjamin, Fisher) – 5:26

=== Side two ===
1. "Hold on, You're Crazy" (Watts) – 4:31
2. "See You Again" (Watts) – 4:22
3. "Too Short Arms (I Don't Care)" (Fisher, Major) – 4:00
4. "Broadside Outcasts" (Fisher, Watts) – 3:18
5. "Good Times" (Harry Vanda, George Young) – 3:57

== Personnel ==
=== Mott ===
- Nigel Benjamin – lead vocals, rhythm and acoustic guitars
- Ray Major – lead and slide guitars, backing vocals
- Morgan Fisher – piano, backing vocals, organ, synthesizer
- Pete Overend Watts – bass, backing vocals
- Dale "Buffin" Griffin – drums, backing vocals, percussion

=== Technical ===
- Mott – producer, arranger
- Eddie Kramer – producer, engineer
- Mick "The Mint" Glossop – engineer
- Bill Price, Ric Stokes – mastering
- Roslav Szaybo – design
- Alan Messer, Dale Griffin, Gered Mankowitz – photography
