= Roll Away the Stone =

1974 single by Mott the Hoople

Single by Mott the Hoople

from the album The Hoople
- B-side: "Where Do You All Come From?"
- Released: November 1973 (UK); 1974 (US)
- Recorded: July 1973
- Genre: Glam rock; pop rock
- Length: 3:02
- Label: CBS
- Songwriter: Ian Hunter
- Producer: Mott the Hoople

Mott the Hoople singles chronology
"All the Way from Memphis" (1973)	"Roll Away the Stone" (1973)	"The Golden Age of Rock 'n' Roll" (1974)

Audio
- "Roll Away the Stone" on YouTube

"Roll Away the Stone" is a song written by Ian Hunter, recorded by English rock band Mott the Hoople, and released as a single on the CBS label. On the first version, recorded before Mick Ralphs left the band, Ralphs plays lead guitar and one of the Thunderthighs handles the bridge voice. It was re-recorded by the band for their 1974 album The Hoople, with Ariel Bender on harmony lead line and Lynsey de Paul singing the vocal bridge.

It reached No. 8 on the UK Singles Chart for two weeks in December 1973, spending five weeks in the top 10. The band performed the song on the BBC Television show Top of the Pops on 15 November 1973.

Cash Box said that "Hunter's unique, far reaching vocals are stronger than ever and the rest of the group backing him musically is up to the task." Record World called it Mott the Hoople's "biggest rocker since their label debut" and said that the "Easter-themed love epistle should sha-la-la itself to monumental status."

It featured in the 2015 film The Diary of a Teenage Girl, as well as on the soundtrack album.

== Personnel ==
- Ian Hunter – vocals, rhythm guitar, piano
- Pete Overend Watts – bass guitar, vocals, rhythm guitar, 12-string guitar
- Dale "Buffin" Griffin – drums, vocals, percussion
- Ariel Bender – lead guitar, vocals, slide guitar
- Morgan Fisher – keyboards, synthesizer
- Lynsey De Paul – backing vocals
- Mick Ralphs – rhythm and lead guitar (Bender added harmony lead line)
- Thunderthighs (Karen Friedman, Dari Lalou & Casey Synge) – backing vocals
