= The Hoople =

Studio album by Mott the Hoople
- Released: 29 March 1974
- Recorded: January–February 1974
- Studios: Advision (London); AIR (London)
- Genres: Glam rock, hard rock
- Length: 39:09
- Labels: CBS (UK); Columbia (U.S.)
- Producers: Dale "Buffin" Griffin, Ian Hunter and Pete "Overend" Watts

Mott the Hoople chronology
Mott (1973)	The Hoople (1974)	Live (1974)

Singles from The Hoople
- 1. "Roll Away the Stone" Released: 9 November 1973 (UK); 2. "The Golden Age of Rock 'n' Roll" Released: 15 March 1974 (UK)

Professional ratings
Review scores
Source	Rating
AllMusic	4.5/5 stars
Christgau's Record Guide	B
Record Collector	3/5 stars
Rolling Stone	Favourable
Tom Hull	A−

The Hoople is the seventh and final studio album by the British rock band Mott the Hoople. The album peaked in the UK Albums Chart at No. 11, whilst its highest chart rating in the US was No. 28. It was the 85th best selling album of 1974 and was voted 16th best album of 1974 by the readers of Creem magazine. A remastered and expanded version was released by Sony BMG on the Columbia Legacy label in Europe in 2006. It was the only studio album to feature guitarist Ariel Bender, replacing Mick Ralphs (who nevertheless appeared on two tracks), and the last album to feature vocalist Ian Hunter before his departure for a solo career.

The album's cover features a stylised portrait of Kari-Ann Moller (with the band members in her hair), who also graces the cover of Roxy Music's 1972 debut album.

The album was also released in quadraphonic sound with a different mix emphasising added sound effects.

== Track listing ==
All tracks written by Ian Hunter except where noted.

=== Side one ===
1. "The Golden Age of Rock 'n' Roll" – 3:26
2. "Marionette" – 5:08
3. "Alice" – 5:20
4. "Crash Street Kidds" – 4:31

=== Side two ===
5. "Born Late '58" (Pete Overend Watts) – 4:00
6. “Trudi's Song" – 4:26
7. "Pearl 'n' Roy (England)" – 4:31
8. "Through the Looking Glass" – 4:37
9. "Roll Away the Stone" – 3:10

=== Bonus tracks on 2006 CD reissue ===
10. "Where Do You All Come From" (Dale "Buffin" Griffin, Hunter, Mick Ralphs, Peter Watts) – 3:26 B-side of "Roll Away the Stone" single.
11. "Rest in Peace" – 3:55 B-side of "The Golden Age of Rock 'n' Roll" single.
12. "Foxy, Foxy" – 3:31 Non-LP single A-side.
13. "(Do You Remember) The Saturday Gigs" – 4:20 Non-LP single A-side.
14. "The Saturday Kids" – 6:03 (Work in progress mixes)
15. "Lounge Lizzard" – 4:19 (Aborted single b-side)
16. "American Pie/The Golden Age of Rock 'n' Roll" (Don McLean, Hunter) (Live) – 4:15 (Live from Broadway)

== Personnel ==
Mott the Hoople

- Ian Hunter – vocals, rhythm guitar
- Pete Overend Watts – bass guitar, vocals, lead vocals on "Born Late '58", rhythm guitar, 12-string guitar
- Dale "Buffin" Griffin – drums
- Ariel Bender – lead guitar, vocals
- Morgan Fisher – keyboards, synthesizer

Additional personnel

- Howie Casey – tenor saxophone on 1 2 3 7
- Jock McPherson – baritone saxophone on 1 2 7, tenor saxophone on 1 2 7
- Mike Hurwitz – cello on 2
- Lynsey De Paul – backing vocals on 3 9
- Mick Ralphs – backing vocals on 7, rhythm and lead guitar on 9 (Ariel added harmony lead line)
- Graham Preskett – violin on 8, conductor on 8, tubular bells on 8
- Barry St. John, Sue and Sunny – backing vocals on 1 8
- Thunderthighs (Karen Friedman, Dari Lalou & Casey Synge) – backing vocals on 9

Technical

- Dan Loggins – production supervisor
- Mike Dunne, Paul Hardiman – engineer (Advision Studios)
- Bill Price, Gary Edwards, Peter Swettenham, Sean Milligan – engineer (Air Studios)
- Roslav Szaybo – sleeve concept, design
- John Brown – photography

== Charts ==
Chart (1974)	Peak position
Canada Top Albums/CDs (RPM)	28
Norwegian Albums (VG-lista)	11
UK Albums (Official Charts)	11
US Billboard 200	28

== Certifications ==
Region	Certification	Certified units/sales
United Kingdom (BPI)	Gold	100,000^{^}
^{^} Shipments figures based on certification alone.
