= Saturday Gigs =

Single by Mott the Hoople
- B-side: "Medley: Jerkin' Crocus/Sucker/Violence"
- Released: 18 October 1974
- Recorded: 1974
- Genre: Glam rock
- Length: 4:20
- Label: Columbia Records
- Songwriter(s): Ian Hunter
- Producer(s): Mott the Hoople

Mott the Hoople singles chronology
"Foxy, Foxy" (1974)	"Saturday Gigs" (1974)	"Drive On" (1975)

"Saturday Gigs" is a 7" single released by Mott the Hoople, written by Ian Hunter.

== Background ==
It was the last studio recording made by the group before Ian Hunter left and the group reformed as simply "Mott". Guitarist Ariel Bender was replaced by Mick Ronson during the production of the single, marking Ronson's only official appearance on a Mott the Hoople release. Ronson's image was used in the middle of the band's line-up on the single's cover sleeve. Another track, "Lounge Lizard", was recorded as a planned B-side, but was not used. The Mott the Hoople recording eventually turned up on the extended CD re-issue of The Hoople in 2006. This song was played live during the 1974 European tour as the set's ending but also at the Mott the Hoople Reunion concerts in 2009 with it being the closing song of the final concert.

== Chart performance ==
The single peaked at No. 41 in the UK Singles Chart.
