= The Golden Age of Rock 'n' Roll =

Single by Mott the Hoople

from the album The Hoople
- B-side: "Rest In Peace"
- Released: February 1974
- Recorded: January–February 1974
- Genre: Glam rock; rock and roll
- Length: 3:26
- Label: CBS Records/Columbia Records
- Songwriter: Ian Hunter
- Producer: Mott the Hoople

Mott the Hoople singles chronology
"Roll Away the Stone" (1973)	"The Golden Age of Rock 'n' Roll" (1974)	"Foxy, Foxy" (1974)

"The Golden Age of Rock 'n' Roll" is a single by Mott the Hoople, written by Ian Hunter. It is a release from 1974's The Hoople.

== Background ==
When performed live by Matt the Hoople, "The Golden Age of Rock 'n' Roll" would sometimes follow a portion of Don McLean's song "American Pie." This version of the "The Golden Age of Rock 'n' Roll" was featured on the 1974 Mott the Hoople live album Live.

== Reception ==
Cash Box called it a "hard driving rocker typical of the great work the group has been turning out of late" that is "highlighted by the strength of Hunter’s vocals and a strong keyboard and lead guitar." Record World said "Horn lines from Larry Williams' 'Boney Maroney' wedded to Mott's brand of glitter rock means a hit marriage of the past and the future of rock."

== Chart performance ==
It reached number 16 on the UK Singles Chart. In the US, "The Golden Age of Rock 'n' Roll " went to number 96, and was one three Mott the Hoople releases to hit the Hot 100. In Canada, it reached number 64.

== Cover versions ==
Def Leppard covered the song for their 2006 covers album Yeah! "The one I assumed I'd breeze through was 'The Golden Age of Rock 'n' Roll'," observed singer Joe Elliott, "which I know backwards, inside out and in foreign languages. We had to take that one down a key because I just couldn't do it."
