= British Lions (band) =

British rock band

- Origin: Herefordshire, England
- Genres: Glam rock, hard rock
- Years active: 1977–1980
- Labels: Vertigo/RSO, Angel Air
- Spinoff of: Mott the Hoople
- Past members: Dale "Buffin" Griffin; Morgan Fisher; Ray Majors; John Fiddler; Pete Watts; Steve Hyams

British Lions were a short-lived rock band from Herefordshire from 1977 to 1979, with former members of Mott and Medicine Head. They toured Britain extensively, as support to Status Quo, whose management they shared, and AC/DC, but were more successful in America. They released two studio albums with little commercial success in the UK. Their second album was rejected by RSO and then by Vertigo, and they disbanded in 1979. The release rights were acquired by Cherry Red, who released it the following year. Their debut album was reissued in 2023 by Think Like A Key Music.

== Members ==
- Morgan Fisher – piano, Hammond organ, Korg synthesizer, davolisint
- John Fiddler – guitar, harmonica, vocals
- Dale Griffin – drums
- Ray Majors – guitar, vocals
- Pete Overend Watts – bass, vocals

== Discography ==
=== Studio albums ===
Year	Title	Peak chart positions		
Year	Title	UK	US	Canada
1978	British Lions: Released: February 10, 1978; Label: Vertigo; Format:	-	83	80
1980	Trouble with Women: Released: June 6, 1980; Label: Cherry Red; Format:	-	-	-

=== Singles ===
- "One More Chance to Run" (1977)
- "Wild in the Streets" (1978) - US No. 87
- "International Heroes"/"Eat the Rich" (1978)

=== Compilations and live albums ===
- Live and Rare (1999)
- Live at the Old Waldorf: San Francisco 1978 (2010)
