= Honaloochie Boogie =

1973 single by Mott the Hoople

Single by Mott the Hoople

from the album Mott
- B-side: "Rose"
- Released: 25 May 1973
- Recorded: 1973
- Genre: Glam rock
- Length: 2:43
- Label: Columbia Records
- Songwriter: Ian Hunter
- Producer: Mott the Hoople

Mott the Hoople singles chronology
"Sweet Jane" (1972)	"Honaloochie Boogie" (1973)	"All the Way from Memphis" (1973)

"Honaloochie Boogie" is a single released by Mott the Hoople on the album Mott. It was the follow-up to their breakthrough single "All The Young Dudes". It reached a peak position of No. 12 in the UK Singles Chart in July 1973. Written and sung by vocalist Ian Hunter, apart from the group's regular line-up, it also featured Andy Mackay of Roxy Music on tenor saxophone, Bill Price on moog, and Paul Buckmaster on cello.

Hunter originally believed he was influenced by the film That'll Be The Day when writing the song, but later realized that was not case. The word "Honaloochie" is completely made up.

Record World said that it "has all the ingredients for a biggie!"

A cover version was released as a promo single in France by Babylon Zoo in 1999 and included on their album King Kong Groover.
