= Mott the Hoople =

British rock band

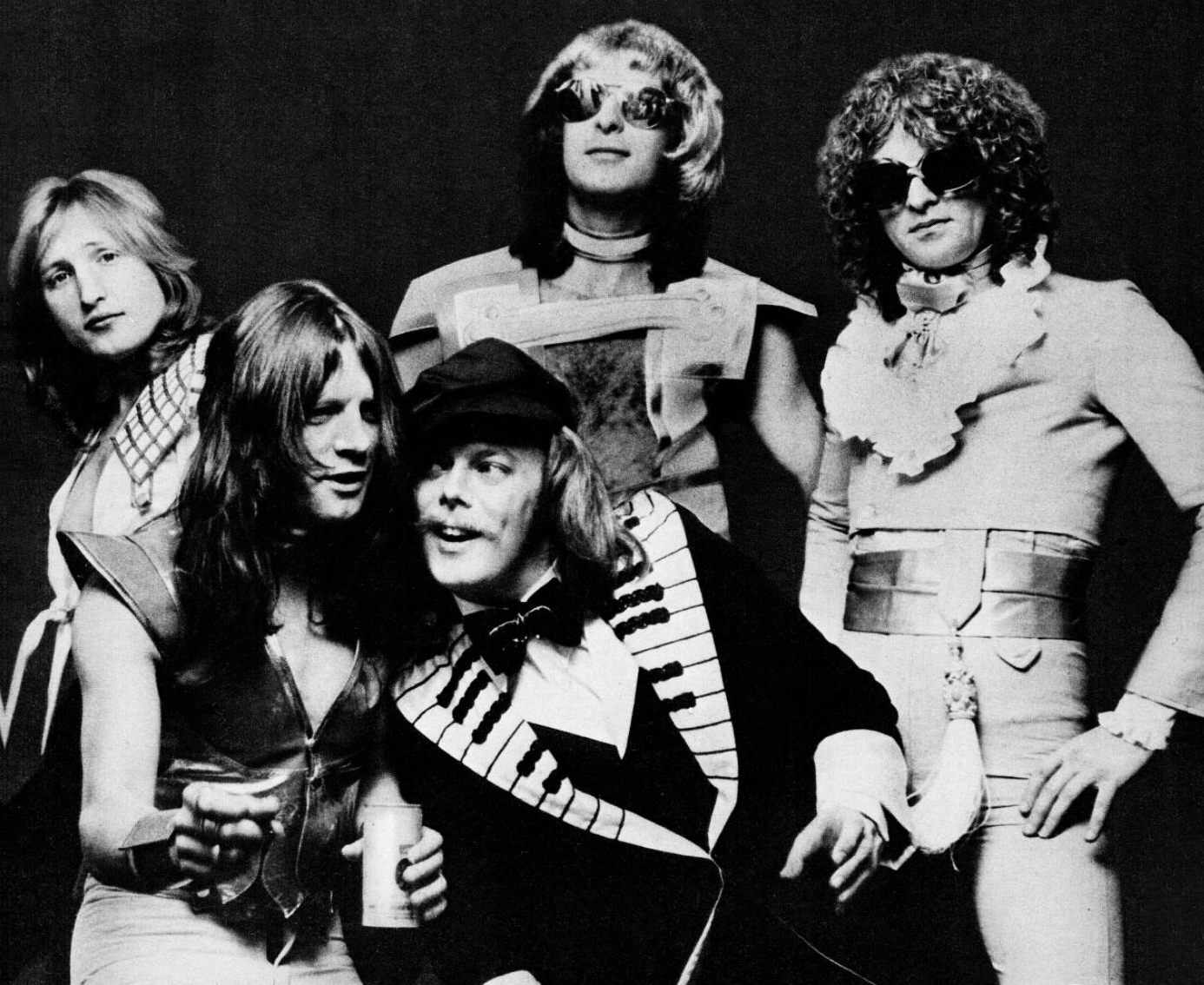
- Mott the Hoople in 1974 (left to right: Dale Griffin, Ariel Bender, Morgan Fisher (front), Pete Overend Watts, Ian Hunter)

Background information
- Also known as: The Doc Thomas Group (1966–1969); Mott (1974–1976); British Lions (1977–1979)
- Origin: Hereford, Herefordshire, England
- Genres: Glam rock; hard rock
- Years active: 1969–1980 (reunions: 2009, 2013, 2018, 2019)
- Labels: Island; Atlantic; CBS; Columbia
- Spinoffs: Bad Company
- Past members: Pete Overend Watts; Dale "Buffin" Griffin; Mick Ralphs; Verden Allen; Stan Tippins; Ian Hunter; Mick Bolton; Blue Weaver; Ariel Bender; Morgan Fisher; Mick Ronson; Ray Majors; Nigel Benjamin; James Mastro; Steve Holley; Steve Hyams

Mott the Hoople were an English rock band formed in Hereford in 1966. Originally named the Doc Thomas Group, the band changed their name after signing with Island Records in 1969. The band released albums at the beginning of the 1970s but failed to find any success. On the verge of breaking up, the band were encouraged by David Bowie to stay together. Bowie wrote their glam-style signature song "All the Young Dudes" for them, which became their first hit in 1972. Bowie subsequently produced their album of the same name, which added to their success.

Despite membership changes, the band experienced further commercial success with the albums Mott (1973) and The Hoople (1974). Lead singer Ian Hunter departed the band in 1974, after which the band's commercial fortunes began to diminish. They remained together amid ongoing membership changes until their breakup in 1980. The band have had reunions in 2009, 2013, 2018 and 2019.

== History ==
=== Pre-Mott ===
The Doc Thomas Group were formed in 1966 with Mick Ralphs on guitar, Stan Tippins on vocals, and Pete Overend Watts on bass. Ralphs and Tippins had been in a local Hereford band, the Buddies, and Watts had been in a local Ross-on-Wye band the Soulents with Dale "Buffin" Griffin on drums. The Doc Thomas Group had a concert residency at a nightclub in a resort town in Italy. The group were offered a recording contract with the Italian label Dischi Interrecord, and released an eponymous album in January 1967. By 1968, Griffin and organist Verden Allen had joined the band.

Although the group toured and recorded in Italy as the Doc Thomas Group, their gigs in the UK were played under the names of the Shakedown Sound and, later, Silence. Silence recorded demos at Rockfield Studios in Monmouth, Wales, which were offered to EMI, Polydor, Immediate and Apple but with no success.

=== Early years ===
The group came to the attention of Guy Stevens at Island Records, who liked the group but not with Tippins as lead singer. Advertisements were placed ("Singer wanted, must be image-minded and hungry"), and Ian Hunter was selected as lead singer and piano player. Tippins assumed the role of road manager. While in prison for a drug offence, Stevens read the Willard Manus novel Mott the Hoople, about an eccentric who works in a circus freak show, and decided to use it as a band name. Silence reluctantly agreed to change the band's name to Mott the Hoople following their audition for Stevens in early 1969. Manus's novel's title was in turn a reference to "Martha Hoople", which was the name of a character from the comic strip Our Boarding House, which was widely syndicated in American newspapers from 1921 to 1984.

The band's debut album, Mott the Hoople (1969), recorded in only a week, was a cult success. Their repertoire included cover versions of "Laugh at Me" (Sonny Bono) and "At the Crossroads" (Doug Sahm's Sir Douglas Quintet), and an instrumental cover of "You Really Got Me" (The Kinks).

The second album, Mad Shadows (1970), sold poorly and received generally negative reviews. Wildlife (1971) fared even worse, despite gaining the highest UK album chart position of the band's pre-Glam years. It featured an overtly country-hippie stance and more acoustic instrumentation on some Ralphs-penned songs.

On 10 October 1970, Mott the Hoople, the Senator (aka the Walrus), and Bridget St John were showcased on BBC2's Disco 2. Even though the group were building a decent following, Brain Capers (1971) failed to sell well. The group decided to split following a depressing concert in a former gas holder in Switzerland. When their UK tour with The Lothringers was aborted, the band were close to breaking up.

=== Glam years ===
David Bowie had long been a fan of the band. After learning from Watts that they were about to split, he persuaded them to stay together and offered them "Suffragette City", which later appeared on his Ziggy Stardust album. They turned it down. Bowie also penned "All the Young Dudes" for them, and it became their biggest hit. Released as a single in July 1972, it was a success in the UK, with the band using Tippins – who by this time was their tour manager – to sing backing vocals during concerts. Bowie produced an album, also called All the Young Dudes, which included a Mick Ronson strings and brass arrangement for "Sea Diver". It sold well, but stalled at No. 21 in the UK Albums Chart. Hunter authored a book entitled Diary of a Rock 'n' Roll Star about the day-to-day life on the band's subsequent 1972 winter tour of the US, covering the ups and downs of life on the road, and it was eventually published in June 1974. It was out of print for many years but was reissued in 1996.

A casualty in the wake of All the Young Dudes was Verden Allen, who departed before the release of their next album, Mott. Mott climbed into the Top 10 of the UK Albums Chart, and became the band's best-seller to date in the US. It yielded two UK hits, "Honaloochie Boogie" and "All the Way from Memphis", both featuring Andy Mackay of Roxy Music on saxophone. "All the Way from Memphis" is also featured in the movie Alice Doesn't Live Here Anymore.

In May 1973, following Verden Allen's departure, the band were augmented by two keyboard players. Former Love Affair and Morgan member Morgan Fisher joined as keyboardist and Mick Bolton joined on Hammond organ. Bolton left at the end of 1973 and was replaced on tour by Blue Weaver, while Fisher stayed on to become Allen's official replacement in the band. Ralphs left in August 1973 to form Bad Company and was replaced by former Spooky Tooth guitarist Luther Grosvenor. For contractual reasons, he changed his name to Ariel Bender at the suggestion of singer-songwriter Lynsey de Paul for his stint with the band. According to Ian Hunter, interviewed in the documentary Ballad of Mott the Hoople, the band were in Germany with de Paul for a TV show when Mick Ralphs walked down a street bending a succession of car aerials in frustration. De Paul came out with the phrase "aerial bender" which Hunter later suggested to Grosvenor as a stage name.

At the end of 1973, the band had a chart success in the UK with "Roll Away the Stone" recorded before Mick Ralphs left the band. Ralphs played lead guitar and the Thunderthighs provided female vocal backing and a bridge. It reached No.8 on the UK Singles Chart. In 1974, the album version of "Roll Away the Stone" credited to Mott the Hoople and Lynsey de Paul with the vocal bridge from de Paul and guitar from Ariel Bender was released in Japan, backed with a live version of "All The Young Dudes" as the B-side.

In 1974, Mott the Hoople toured America with Ariel Bender playing lead guitar. In one of Bender's earliest performances with the band they played the Masonic Temple in Detroit on 12 October 1973 with a young Aerosmith opening the show. They were primarily supported on the 1974 tour by the band Queen. This tour later provided the inspiration for Queen's 1975 single "Now I'm Here", which contains the lyrics "Down in the city, just Hoople and me." The song became a live favourite of Queen fans and reached No. 11 in the UK Singles Chart. The tour resulted in a lifelong friendship between the two bands, with Ian Hunter, Mick Ronson and David Bowie performing "All the Young Dudes" at the Freddie Mercury Tribute Concert in 1992. Morgan Fisher went on to play piano on Queen's 'Hot Space' tour in 1982, and Brian May, Freddie Mercury and Roger Taylor performed backing vocals on the Ian Hunter solo song, "You Nearly Did Me In". May would later cover Mott's "All the Way from Memphis" on his solo album, Another World, with Hunter making a guest appearance. Mott the Hoople are name-checked on two other hit singles. Reunion's 1974 single "Life Is a Rock (But the Radio Rolled Me)" begins with the lyrics 'B Bumble and the Stingers, Mott the Hoople, Ray Charles Singers...'.; and R.E.M.'s "Man on the Moon" begins with 'Mott the Hoople and the Game of Life, yeah, yeah, yeah, yeah...'

In the afterglow of The Hoople (1974), a live album Live was quickly released, after which Mick Ronson replaced Bender. The end was near when both Hunter and Ronson left the group to commence Hunter's solo career following which the band abbreviated its name to 'Mott'.

=== Post-Hunter years ===
The new line-up consisted of Watts, Griffin, and Fisher along with lead guitarist Ray Majors (formerly of Opal Butterfly, Hackensack, and brief stints with Andy Fraser and Frankie Miller) and lead vocalist Nigel Benjamin. This line-up released two more albums, Drive On (1975) and Shouting and Pointing (1976), both of which failed to match the commercial success of releases during Hunter's tenure, particularly in the United States. After Benjamin quit in 1976 (notably going on to join early Los Angeles glam metal band London with Nikki Sixx, later of Mötley Crüe, in 1980), Mott briefly replaced him with Steve Hyams, before joining forces with John Fiddler (formerly of Medicine Head), and became British Lions, recording two albums, British Lions (1977) and Trouble With Women (posthumously released on Cherry Red Records 1980) before finally splitting up without any chart success. Hunter and Ronson worked and toured together sporadically until Ronson's death in 1993. Hunter has continued his solo career.

In 1990, after a brief reunion in 1989, the former members of The Silence reunited in the studio to record a mix of new songs and staples from their days performing together. The resultant album Shotgun Eyes was released in 1998, combined with The Italian Job (a re-release of the Doc Thomas Group's self-titled album).

In 1996, K-tel released a CD called The Best of Mott the Hoople purporting to be re-recordings of the band's hits and new songs by Hunter and Ronson. In actuality, the recording was by Danny McCulloch, former bass player with Eric Burdon and the New Animals and Gerry Chapman, usually going under the band name of The Trybe. The album consisted of heavy rock versions of Mott's hits and original songs, and had nothing at all to do with the original Mott the Hoople. K-tel were subsequently fined for supplying goods with a false description, but the tracks and album continued to circulate under the name Mott the Hoople, often appearing on compilation albums. In 2002, the tracks were released again as I Can't Believe It's Not Mott the Hoople!, though this time it was credited to The Trybe.

On 16 and 17 April 1999, the first and only 'Mott the Hoople Convention' was held at the Robin Hood Pub in Bilston, Wolverhampton, England. Hunter and his band performed both evenings of the convention. During the encore of the Ian Hunter Band's performance of 17 April, Hunter was joined onstage by Bender and Allen for a version of "Walkin' With A Mountain"; Allen performed on the original studio version of the song, whilst Bender performed an extended solo during performances of the song on Mott the Hoople's 1973–74 tours.

In 2002 and 2004, Ralphs toured with Hunter, as part of the latter's backing band.

No Mott the Hoople reunion occurred prior to 2009, although negotiations for one were attempted in 1985; all parties have shown some interest at various times in the idea over the last 30 years. In 2005 it was reported in the publication Classic Rock that Hunter had received the offer of a seven-figure number to re-form the band. In October 2007 at Hunter's concert at the Shepherd's Bush Empire, he was joined by Ralphs and Allen for the encore.

=== 2009 reunion ===
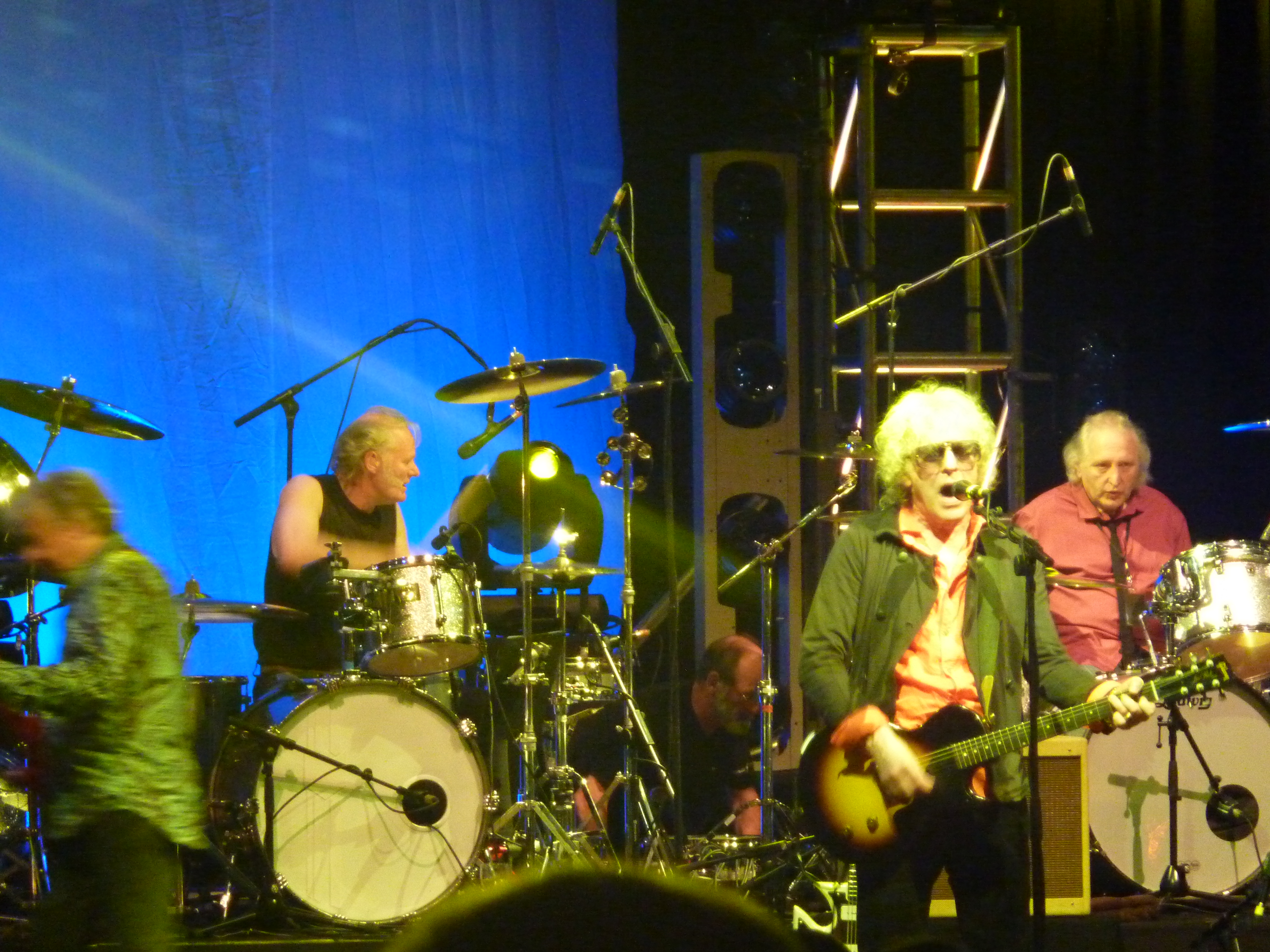
Mott the Hoople reunion, 2009

On 16 January 2009, it was announced that the band would be re-uniting for two concerts at the Hammersmith Apollo in London, in October 2009. According to Hunter's web site, all five of the original members would participate in the reunion. Hunter wrote, "Why are we doing it? I can't speak for the others, but I'm doing it just to see what it's like. Short of war, death, famine etc... it's ON." Tickets for the two original dates sold out, and a third date at the same venue was added for 3 October 2009. After that one sold out as well another two dates were added on 5 and 6 October. The special limited 3 CD-set recorded during the first show at Hammersmith Apollo was sold directly after the concerts.

Mott the Hoople also held a warmup gig prior to their five-night stand at the HMV Hammersmith Apollo in October. The show was held at the Blake Theatre in Monmouth, Wales, on 26 September 2009. Prior to this it was announced that because of the poor health of Buffin, his place for the concerts would be taken by Martin Chambers, drummer of The Pretenders, though Griffin did appear at encores.

The reunion was favourably reviewed by major British broadsheet newspapers, with The Guardian, The Times and The Independent awarding 4/5 stars and The Daily Telegraph awarding 5/5. On 27 November 2009, Mott the Hoople played The Tartan Clefs charity night in Glasgow.

=== 2013 dates ===
Mott the Hoople (featuring Allen, Hunter, Ralphs and Watts with Martin Chambers on drums) played the O2 Arena in London on 18 November 2013, preceded by dates in Birmingham, Glasgow, Newcastle and Manchester (the latter of which was recorded for a limited edition CD/DVD). One critic described the concert at the O2 Arena as "a bit of a slog" and Hunter's voice as "now little more than a guttural rasp". A recording of 17 November 2013 show at the O2 Apollo Manchester was released in June 2014 as a double album/DVD, Live 2013. Several years after the 2013 reunion, Mott the Hoople lost two of its founding members: Dale Griffin died on 17 January 2016 at the age of 67, and Overend Watts died on 22 January 2017 at the age of 69.

=== 2018 dates ===
In February 2018, it was announced that Mott the Hoople would be playing several European dates in the summer of 2018. Ian Hunter would be joined by former bandmates Morgan Fisher on keyboards and Ariel Bender on guitar. In a press release, Hunter said "[Fisher and Bender] toured extensively with Mott and both were featured heavily on The Hoople album after Mick Ralphs and Verden Allen left the band... I know many people were disappointed when neither appeared on the 2009 and 2013 get-togethers. Hope this makes up for it!" The line-up would also include James Mastro and Mark Bosch on guitars, Dennis DiBrizzi on keyboards, Paul Page on bass, and Steve Holley on drums. Holley – a member of Wings from 1978 to 1981 – has been a member of Hunter's "Rant Band" since 2001.

=== 2019 dates ===
In January 2019, the band announced the "Tax the Heat" tour, a brief six-show UK tour in April 2019, preceded by an eight-date tour of the US as "Mott the Hoople '74" (which began on 1 April and concluded on 10 April at the Beacon Theatre in New York City). This was the first time in 45 years that Mott the Hoople had toured the US. Indeed, the core '74 members Ian Hunter, Ariel Bender and Morgan Fisher celebrated the 45th anniversary of their 1974 US tour (hence the name of the bill), as well as the original release of The Hoople and Live, the final albums of the classic Mott the Hoople era. The band includes Ian Hunter (vocals and guitar), Ariel Bender (guitar) and Morgan Fisher (keyboards) joined by James Mastro (guitar, saxophone, mandolin), Steve Holley (drums, backing vocals), Mark Bosch (guitar), Paul Page (bass) and Dennis Dibrizzi (keyboards, backing vocals).

The band were due to tour the US in October and November 2019, performing 11 shows. The tour dates were cancelled due to Ian Hunter's tinnitus.

== Personnel ==
=== Classic lineup ===
- Ian Hunter – vocals, guitar, piano, harmonica, bass (1969–1974, 2009, 2013, 2018, 2019)
- Mick Ralphs – guitar, vocals, organ, synthesizers (1966–1973, 2009, 2013; died 2025)
- Verden Allen – organ, vocals (1967–1972, 2009, 2013)
- Pete Overend Watts – bass, vocals, guitar (1966–1979, 2009, 2013; died 2017)
- Dale "Buffin" Griffin – drums, backing vocals, percussion (1967–1979, guest in 2009; died 2016)

=== Other members ===
- Stan Tippins – vocals (1966–1969)
- Morgan Fisher – keyboards, backing vocals, bass (1973–1979, 2018, 2019)
- Ariel Bender – guitar, backing vocals (1973–1974, 2018, 2019)
- Mick Ronson – guitar, backing vocals (1974; died 1993)
- Ray Majors – guitar, backing vocals (1974–1979; died 2022)
- Nigel Benjamin – vocals, guitar (1974–1976; died 2019)
- Steve Hyams – vocals, guitar (1976; died 2013)
- John Fiddler – vocals, guitar, harmonica (1977–1979)

Touring musicians

- Mick Bolton – organ (1973; died 2021)
- Blue Weaver – organ (1973)
- Martin Chambers – drums, backing vocals, percussion (2009, 2013)
- James Mastro – guitars, saxophone, mandolin, backing vocals (2018, 2019)
- Mark Bosch – guitars, backing vocals (2018, 2019)
- Dennis DiBrizzi – keyboards, backing vocals (2018, 2019)
- Paul Page – bass (2018, 2019)
- Steve Holley – drums, backing vocals (2018, 2019)

== Discography ==
=== Albums ===
- Mott the Hoople (1969) – UK No. 66 / US No. 185
- Mad Shadows (1970) – UK No. 48
- Wildlife (1971) – UK No. 44 / US No. 207 (bubbled under)
- Brain Capers (1971) – US No. 208 (bubbled under)
- All the Young Dudes (1972) – UK No. 21 / US No. 89
- Mott (1973) – UK No. 7 / US No. 35 / Can. No. 43
- The Hoople (1974) – UK No. 11 / US No. 28 / Can. No. 28

=== Mott albums ===
- Drive On (September 1975) – UK No. 35 / US No. 160 (Sony/Rewind 487237 2)
- Shouting and Pointing (June 1976) – UK No. 45 (Sony/Rewind 489492 2)

=== Compilations and live albums ===
- Rock and Roll Queen (1972)
- Live (1974) / US. No. 23
- Greatest Hits (1976)
- Two Miles from Heaven (1980)
- London to Memphis (1991)
- Ballad of Mott the Hoople – A Retrospective (1993)
- Backsliding Fearlessly: The Early Years (1994)
- Original Mixed Up Kids – The BBC Recordings (1996)
- All The Way From Stockholm To Philadelphia - Live 71/72 (1998)
- All the Young Dudes: The Anthology (1998 3-CD box set)
- Rock 'n' Roll Circus Live 1972 (2000)
- A Tale of Two Cities (2000)
- Two Miles from Live Heaven (2001)
- Mott the Hoople Live – 30th Anniversary Edition (2004)
- Family Anthology (2005)
- Live Fillmore West (2006)
- Fairfield Halls, Live 1970 (2007)
- In Performance 1970–1974 (2008) (4-CD box set of live concerts, published by Angel Air Records)
- Old Records Never Die: The Mott the Hoople/Ian Hunter Anthology (2008)
- Hammersmith Apollo – 1 October 2009 (January 2010) (3-CD box set; Indie Europe/Zoom)
- Live at Hammersmith Apollo 2009 (May 2010) (2-CD)
- Live 2013 (June 2014) (double album/DVD of 17 November 2013 concert at the O2 Apollo Manchester)

=== Singles ===
- "Rock and Roll Queen" / "Road to Birmingham" (October 1969)
- "Rock and Roll Queen" / "Backsliding Fearlessly" (January 1970)
- "Midnight Lady" / "It Must Be Love" (October 1971)
- "Downtown" / "Home Is Where I Want to Be" (December 1971)
- "All the Young Dudes" / "One of the Boys" (July 1972) – UK No. 3 / US No. 37 / Can No. 31
- "One of the Boys" / "Sucker" (January 1973) US No. 96
- "Sweet Jane" / "Jerkin' Crocus" (March 1973) – (not released in the UK)
- "Honaloochie Boogie" / "Rose" (May 1973) – UK No. 12
- "All the Way from Memphis" / "Ballad of Mott the Hoople (26 March 1972 – Zürich)" (August 1973) – UK No. 10
- "Roll Away the Stone" / "Where Do You All Come From" (November 1973) – UK No. 8
- "The Golden Age of Rock 'n' Roll" / "Rest in Peace" (March 1974) – UK No. 16 / US No. 96
- "Foxy, Foxy" / "Trudi's Song" (June 1974) – UK No. 33
- "Saturday Gigs" / Medley; "Jerkin' Crocus" – "Sucker" (live) (October 1974) – UK No. 41
- "All the Young Dudes" (live) / "Rose" (December 1974)

== See also ==
- List of Island Records artists
- List of glam rock artists
- List of performers on Top of the Pops
- Tony Mott

== Bibliography ==
- Mott the Hoople (a novel by Willard Manus) ISBN 0-7351-0377-1
