= Foxy, Foxy =

Single by Mott the Hoople
- B-side: "Trudi's Song"
- Released: 7 June 1974
- Recorded: 1974
- Genre: Glam rock, soft rock
- Length: 3:26
- Label: CBS Records/Columbia Records
- Songwriter(s): Ian Hunter
- Producer(s): Mott the Hoople

Mott the Hoople singles chronology
"The Golden Age of Rock 'n' Roll" (1974)	"Foxy, Foxy" (1974)	"Saturday Gigs" (1974)

"Foxy, Foxy" is a non-LP single released by Mott the Hoople in 1974. It reached number 33 on the UK Singles Chart, their penultimate entry in that listing.
