= All the Young Dudes =

1972 single by Mott the Hoople

Single by Mott the Hoople

from the album All the Young Dudes
- B-side: "One of the Boys"
- Released: 28 July 1972
- Recorded: 14 May 1972
- Studio: Olympic (Barnes, London)
- Genre: Glam rock
- Length: 3:32
- Label: CBS (UK); Columbia (US)
- Songwriter: David Bowie
- Producer: David Bowie

Mott the Hoople singles chronology
"Downtown" (1971)	"All the Young Dudes" (1972)	"One of the Boys" (1972)

Music video
- Mott The Hoople – All the Young Dudes (audio) on YouTube

"All the Young Dudes" is a song written by the English singer-songwriter David Bowie, originally recorded and released as a single by the English rock band Mott the Hoople in 1972 by Columbia Records. Bowie produced the song, which he had given to the band after they rejected his "Suffragette City". Bowie would subsequently record the song himself. Regarded as an anthem of glam rock, the song has received acclaim and was a commercial success. In 2021, Rolling Stone ranked "All the Young Dudes" number 166 in its list of the 500 Greatest Songs of All Time. It is also one of the Rock and Roll Hall of Fame's 500 Songs that Shaped Rock and Roll.

== Background and recording ==
By 1972, Mott the Hoople were on the verge of splitting up. Having been together for three years, the band had released four well-received albums and developed a small loyal following but had failed to garner commercial success. An appearance on the BBC television programme Top of the Pops in late 1971 was not enough to push their recent single "Midnight Lady" onto the charts. The band had also finished a tour which left them financially unstable.

On 4 February 1972, David Bowie sent the band a demo of "Suffragette City" in hopes they would record it. The band played it and believed it did not fit their style. Bassist Pete Watts contacted Bowie in late March 1972 and politely rejected it, stating the band broke up. Upon learning this, Bowie contacted Watts back two hours later and said, "I've written a song for you since we spoke, which could be great." Bowie had just finished recording two albums consecutively and had another single, "John, I'm Only Dancing", prepared for release, so he was eager to write for other artists. While Bowie's manager Tony Defries worked on signing the band with CBS Records, Bowie met with Watts a few days later and played "All the Young Dudes" on acoustic guitar. Watts recalled: "He hadn't got all the words but the song just blew me away, especially when he hit the chorus." Watts then introduced Bowie to the rest of the band at an office located at Regent Street in London, where Bowie sat cross-legged on the floor and played the band the song.

The band were ecstatic. Ian Hunter recalled: "He just played it on an acoustic guitar. I knew straight away it was a hit. There were chills going down my spine. It's only happened to me a few times in my life, when you know that this is a biggie". Drummer Dale Griffin said: "We couldn't believe it. In the office at Regent Street he's strumming it on his guitar and I'm thinking, he wants to give us that? He must be crazy! We broke our necks to say yes! You couldn't fail to see it was a great song." After playing it, Bowie told them he would produce the track for release as a single while his manager, Tony Defries, informed them he would become their manager. Knowing the track would be a hit, the band agreed to not break up.

Mott the Hoople recorded "All the Young Dudes" at Olympic Studios in London on 14 May 1972, with Bowie producing. (Note: Cann, O'Leary and Doggett list David Bowie and Mick Ronson as co-producers.) The song was engineered and mixed by Keith Harwood, and featured handclaps by Nicky Graham and security guard Stuey George. Describing the session, Hunter said: "It was a high, because we knew we were singing a hit." Bowie recorded a guide vocal for Hunter, which was remixed over the original backing track and released on the 1998 box set All the Young Dudes: The Anthology.

As recounted by Robert Christgau in a 1972 Newsday review, the band added a long extended fadeout to the song. "As the chorus repeats to a fade, Hunter calls out: 'Hey, you there. You with the glasses. I want you. I want you in the front. Now.' Soon, he loves and faces down his victim, who I imagine as some hapless Emerson, Lake & Palmer fan. 'How did it feel?' someone asks. Hunter's reply is barely audible, the last word of the song: 'Sick.'" In his book Rock on the Wild Side: Gay Male Images in Popular Music of the Rock Era, Wayne Studer refers to this as Hunter "camping it up."

== Writing ==
"All the Young Dudes" is a glam rock song in the key of D. With its dirge-like music, youth suicide references and calls to an imaginary audience, the song bore similarities to Bowie's own "Rock 'n' Roll Suicide", the final track from Ziggy Stardust. Described as being to glam rock what "All You Need Is Love" was to the hippie era, the lyrics name-checked contemporary star T. Rex and contained references to the Beatles and the Rolling Stones. NME editors Roy Carr and Charles Shaar Murray have described the track as "one of that rare breed: rock songs which hymn the solidarity of the disaffected without distress or sentimentality".

Bowie himself once claimed that the song was not intended to be an anthem for glam and actually carried a darker message of apocalypse. According to an interview Bowie gave to Rolling Stone magazine in 1973, the boys are carrying the same news that the newscaster was carrying in the song "Five Years" from Ziggy Stardust; the news being the fact that the Earth had only five years left to live. Bowie explains: "'All the Young Dudes' is a song about this news. It's no hymn to the youth, as people thought. It is completely the opposite." "All the Young Dudes" is also thought of as a gay anthem. Lou Reed said, "It's a Gay Anthem! A rallying call to the young dudes to come out in the streets and show that they were beautiful and gay and proud of it."

== Release and aftermath ==
"All the Young Dudes" was released by CBS Records in the UK on 28 July 1972, with the catalogue number CBS 8271. It was a commercial success, peaking at No. 3 on the UK Singles Chart, No. 37 on the US Billboard Hot 100 (in November), and No. 31 in Canada (also in November). Mott the Hoople titled their fifth album after the song, which was produced by Bowie and recorded at Trident Studios in London during the summer of 1972. Throughout autumn 1972, the band joined Bowie and the Spiders from Mars on tour in the U.S.

On 29 November, Bowie boosted their profile by introducing them on stage, including at the Tower Theater outside Philadelphia, and performed the song with Hunter; this performance was released on the 1998 compilation album All the Way from Stockholm to Philadelphia.

The original Mott the Hoople release had to be changed lyrically in order that it might be played on UK radio and television. The line in the second verse: "Wendy's stealing clothes from Marks and Sparks" was a reference to UK retailer Marks & Spencer, also known by that colloquialism. As such, air play of the song in its original form would have breached broadcasting regulations relating to advertising in force at the time. The line was replaced with: "Wendy's stealing clothes from unlocked cars".

Bowie took to performing "All the Young Dudes" on his Ziggy Stardust Tour, and a medley version appears on the album Ziggy Stardust – The Motion Picture, the live recording of the last Ziggy show that was finally released officially in 1983. Bowie's first released version of the song was in 1974 on David Live. Bowie had also offered "Drive-In Saturday" to Mott the Hoople following "All the Young Dudes", but they turned down this offer, at least partially owing to the then-current success of their own "Honaloochie Boogie". According to an anecdote by Bowie on the VH1 Storytellers (2009) album (track 7), his annoyance at the rejection prompted Bowie to shave his eyebrows while in Florida.

In 1992, twenty years after their duet in Philadelphia, Bowie and Hunter again performed the song together with the surviving members of Queen, Mick Ronson, and Def Leppard's Joe Elliott and Phil Collen at the Freddie Mercury Tribute Concert. The song was also featured during the Outside Tour as well as the A Reality Tour, and is included on the video and audio releases of the latter.

=== Usage in media ===
"All the Young Dudes" was featured in the 1995 film Clueless, the 2007 Jason Reitman film Juno and the 2008 film The Wackness. It is also used in Ricky Gervais and Stephen Merchant's 2010 film, Cemetery Junction. "All the Young Dudes" was included in the video game Guitar Hero: Aerosmith as a cover version recorded by Wavegroup.

== Reception ==
"All the Young Dudes" has received critical acclaim, and is regarded as one of glam rock's best recordings. In its review of the single, Record World said that the "'Hey Jude'-ish hook takes on classic status" and "lead singer Ian Hunter vocalizes and acts magnificently." In a review for its parent album, in which he describes it as one of the "most satisfying glam records", Stephen Thomas Erlewine of AllMusic calls "All the Young Dudes" "one of the all-time great rock songs", further praising Bowie's involvement. Mark Deming, also of AllMusic, further praised the song, calling it one of Hunter's best songs, even if he didn't write it.

In 2004, Rolling Stone ranked "All the Young Dudes" number 253 in its list of The 500 Greatest Songs of All Time, moving down to number 256 on its 2010 updated list, and moving up to number 166 in its 2021 revised list. It is also one of the Rock and Roll Hall of Fame's 500 Songs that Shaped Rock and Roll. Jon Savage of The Guardian ranked it the fifth best glam-rock song of all time in 2013.

== Personnel ==
Personnel per biographer Chris O'Leary.

- Ian Hunter – lead vocals, piano
- Mick Ralphs – electric and acoustic guitars, backing vocals
- Pete Overend Watts – bass, backing vocals
- Dale Griffin – drums, tambourine
- Verden Allen – Hammond organ, backing vocals
- David Bowie – backing vocals
- Stan Tippins – backing vocals
- Stuey George – handclaps
- Nicky Graham – handclaps

== Charts ==
1972 weekly chart performance
Chart (1972)	Peak position
Ireland (IRMA)	4
Netherlands (Top 100)	20
New Zealand (Listener)	13
UK Singles (Official Charts)	3
US Billboard Hot 100	37
US Cash Box Top 100	34
US Record World	32
Canada Top Singles (RPM)	31

== Influence and legacy ==
The song’s influence has extended beyond direct cover versions. Green Day’s 2009 single “21 Guns” was noted by critics to bear melodic similarities to the chorus of “All the Young Dudes”. To avoid potential legal disputes, David Bowie—who composed “All the Young Dudes”—was credited as a songwriter on “21 Guns”.

== Cover versions ==
"All the Young Dudes" has been covered by many artists as album tracks, B-sides and in live performances.

Noel Gallagher of Oasis often incorporated the chorus of the song into live versions of their song "Whatever".

Bruce Dickinson (of Iron Maiden) released the song as a single in 1990, which became a hit in Northern Europe, peaking at number 23 in the UK singles chart. The song also features on his first solo album Tattooed Millionaire.

In November 2024, Pet Shop Boys released a cover as a double single with their own song "New London Boy". They had originally performed a version of the track with the BBC Concert Orchestra for BBC Radio 2 in February 2024.

=== David Bowie version ===
"All the Young Dudes"

Song by David Bowie

from the album Rarestonebowie
- Released: May 1995
- Recorded: 7–10 December 1972
- Studio: RCA, New York City
- Genre: Glam rock
- Songwriter: David Bowie
- Producer: David Bowie

Bowie's own studio version, recorded in December 1972 during the sessions for Aladdin Sane, went unreleased until 1995 when it appeared in mono on the album Rarestonebowie. It was subsequently included, again in mono, on The Best of David Bowie 1969/1974, the 2-disc US version of Best of Bowie, and the 30th Anniversary edition of Aladdin Sane. A stereo version, which is around a minute shorter than the mono version, circulated unofficially among collectors and finally saw official release in November 2014 on Bowie's Nothing Has Changed compilation set. There also exists a version consisting of the backing track for Mott the Hoople's version with Bowie's guide vocal. A variant of this version, combining Bowie's vocal on the verses with Ian Hunter's on the chorus, was released on the 2006 reissue of All the Young Dudes. Bowie also used the music in reverse as the basis for "Move On", a track on his 1979 album, Lodger.

==== Certifications ====
Region	Certification	Certified units/sales
United Kingdom (BPI)	Silver	200,000^{‡}
^{‡} Sales+streaming figures based on certification alone.
