= Luther Grosvenor =

English rock guitar player (born 1946)

Luther James Grosvenor
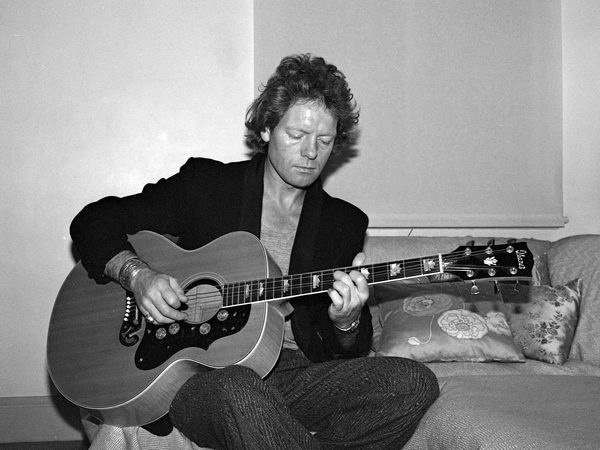
- Grosvenor in 1988

Background information
- Also known as: Ariel Bender
- Born: 23 December 1946 (age 79); Evesham, Worcestershire, England
- Instrument: Guitar
- Label: Ruf Records
- Formerly of: Spooky Tooth; Stealers Wheel; Mott the Hoople; Widowmaker

Luther James Grosvenor (born 23 December 1946) is an English rock musician, who played guitar in Spooky Tooth, briefly in Stealers Wheel and, under the pseudonym Ariel Bender, in Mott the Hoople, Arthur Brown's Kingdom Come and Widowmaker.

Grosvenor was born in Evesham, Worcestershire, England, where he first began playing in local bands. He met Jim Capaldi, who later played with Traffic, with whom he formed a group called Deep Feeling.

Later he joined a group called The V.I.P.'s, in which Keith Emerson played for some time. The V.I.P.'s were renamed Art and later became Spooky Tooth. After leaving Spooky Tooth, he released a solo album, Under Open Skies (Island Records, 1971).

Ian Hunter asked him to join Mott the Hoople on the condition he change his name to Ariel Bender, a name created by singer-songwriter Lynsey de Paul. According to Mott's lead singer Ian Hunter, interviewed in the documentary The Ballad of Mott the Hoople, the band were in Germany with Lynsey de Paul for the TV show Hits-a-Go-Go in Germany on 24 June 1973 when lead guitarist Mick Ralphs walked down a street bending a succession of car aerials in frustration. De Paul came out with the phrase "aerial bender", which Hunter later suggested to Grosvenor as a stage name. Grosvenor joined the band in 1973, replacing Ralphs. Grosvenor toured with Mott in 1973 and 1974 and performed on the band's seventh album, The Hoople (1974).

The years with Spooky Tooth (1967 to 1970), Stealers Wheel (1973) and Mott the Hoople (1973 to 1974) were the most successful years in Grosvenor's musical career. After leaving Mott in 1974 – he was replaced by Mick Ronson – Grosvenor published a few solo albums, and formed Widowmaker, releasing Widowmaker in 1976 and Too Late to Cry in 1977.

In 1995, he recorded two tracks for Viceroy Music's tribute to Peter Green along with former Spooky Tooth drummer Mike Kellie. These songs led to Grosvenor signing a deal with the New York City-based Brilliant Recording Company and produced the Floodgates album. It was released on 15 August 1996. The album again featured Mike Kellie on drums and featured Jess Roden singing vocals on two tracks, Grosvenor did the vocals on the rest of the album. The album was produced by Grosvenor and Mick Dolan.

In 1999, Grosvenor returned in a Spooky Tooth reunion (without Gary Wright), and recorded Cross Purpose again for the Brilliant Recording Company. In 2005, he revived his pseudonym and formed the Ariel Bender Band. In 2007 and 2008, he performed under the name Ariel Bender's Mott the Hoople, performing both Spooky Tooth and Mott the Hoople songs, as well as cover songs.

In 2009, he worked with London act, The Winter Olympics, recording guitar parts for their song, "The Great Outdoors", which was released in August 2010.

In 2011 Grosvenor released the If You Dare album, featuring Marc Eden on guest vocals

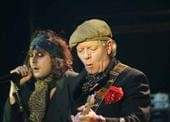
Grosvenor as Ariel Bender in 2020

In June 2018, performing as Ariel Bender, Grosvenor played three Mott the Hoople reunion shows with Hunter and 1974 Mott pianist Morgan Fisher, backed by Hunter's Rant Band. The shows were at festivals in Spain and the United Kingdom and a concert in Norway. In April 2019, performing as Ariel Bender, Grosvenor played 14 Mott the Hoople reunion shows – eight in the US, six in the UK – with Hunter and 1974 Mott pianist Morgan Fisher, backed by Hunter's Rant Band. Later in 2019, a planned MTH 74 11-city swing largely through the southern US was canceled because of Hunter's bout with tinnitus.

== Discography ==
- 1971 : Under Open Skies
- 1996 : Floodgates
- 2001 : Floodgates – Anthology
- 2011 : If You Dare
- 2024 : Another Journey
- 2025 : I Really Don't Know

== Media depictions ==
Grosvenor is featured along with Spooky Tooth in the 1970 documentary Groupies.
