= Morgan Fisher =

English keyboard player and composer (born 1950)

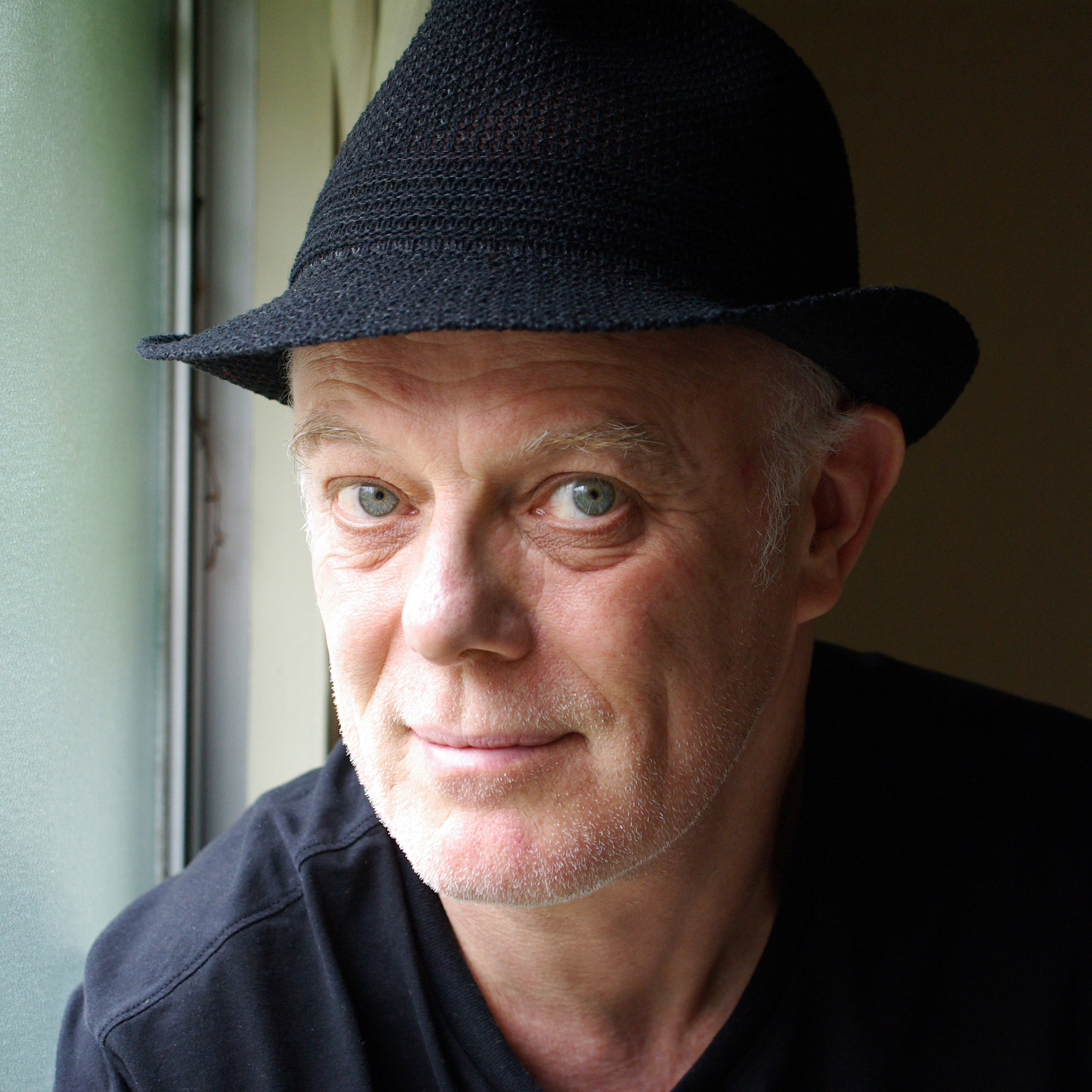

Background information
- Born: Stephen Morgan Fisher; 1 January 1950 (age 76); Middlesex Hospital, London, England
- Occupation: Musician
- Instrument: Keyboards
- Years active: 1960s–present
- Website: morgan-fisher.com

Stephen Morgan Fisher (born 1 January 1950) is an English keyboard player and composer, and is best known as a member of Mott the Hoople in the early 1970s. However, his career has spanned a wide range of musical activities, and he remains active in the music industry. In recent years he has expanded into photography.

== Music career ==
=== Love Affair and Mott the Hoople: 1966–1976 ===
From 1966 to 1970, he played the organ with the soul/pop band the Soul Survivors, who in 1967 renamed themselves Love Affair. They had a number one hit single in 1968 with "Everlasting Love", while Fisher was taking a break from the band to complete his final year at Hendon County Grammar school: "I joined the band when I was still at school, and then various people convinced me I ought to stay at school to finish my 'A' Levels. So I left them for about six months, during which time they had a number one hit. I had no plan to come back, but after they had a number one hit".

In late 1968, Fisher asked a friend of his to write a letter to Love Affair to give them an update on his personal life, writing that Morgan was out of school now. The band sent a letter back to Fisher, asking him if he wanted to rejoin the group, as they weren't really getting along with Lynton Guest and were wanting him replaced. Morgan was in Love Affair again, and was so until 1971.

When Fisher left Love Affair in 1971, he formed the progressive rock band called Morgan, with singer Tim Staffell (the lead singer of the band Smile, who later became Queen) and Love Affair drummer Maurice Bacon. They only released one album Nova Solis, in 1972, before disbanding in 1973. A second album, "The Sleeper Wakes", recorded in 1973, was released in 1976.

From 1973 to 1976, after a brief liaison with Third Ear Band, he joined British rock band Mott the Hoople. Morgan was known for his eccentric black suit jacket with piano keys styled on the suit lapels. Meanwhile, Fisher contributed keyboards to John Fiddler's Medicine Head.

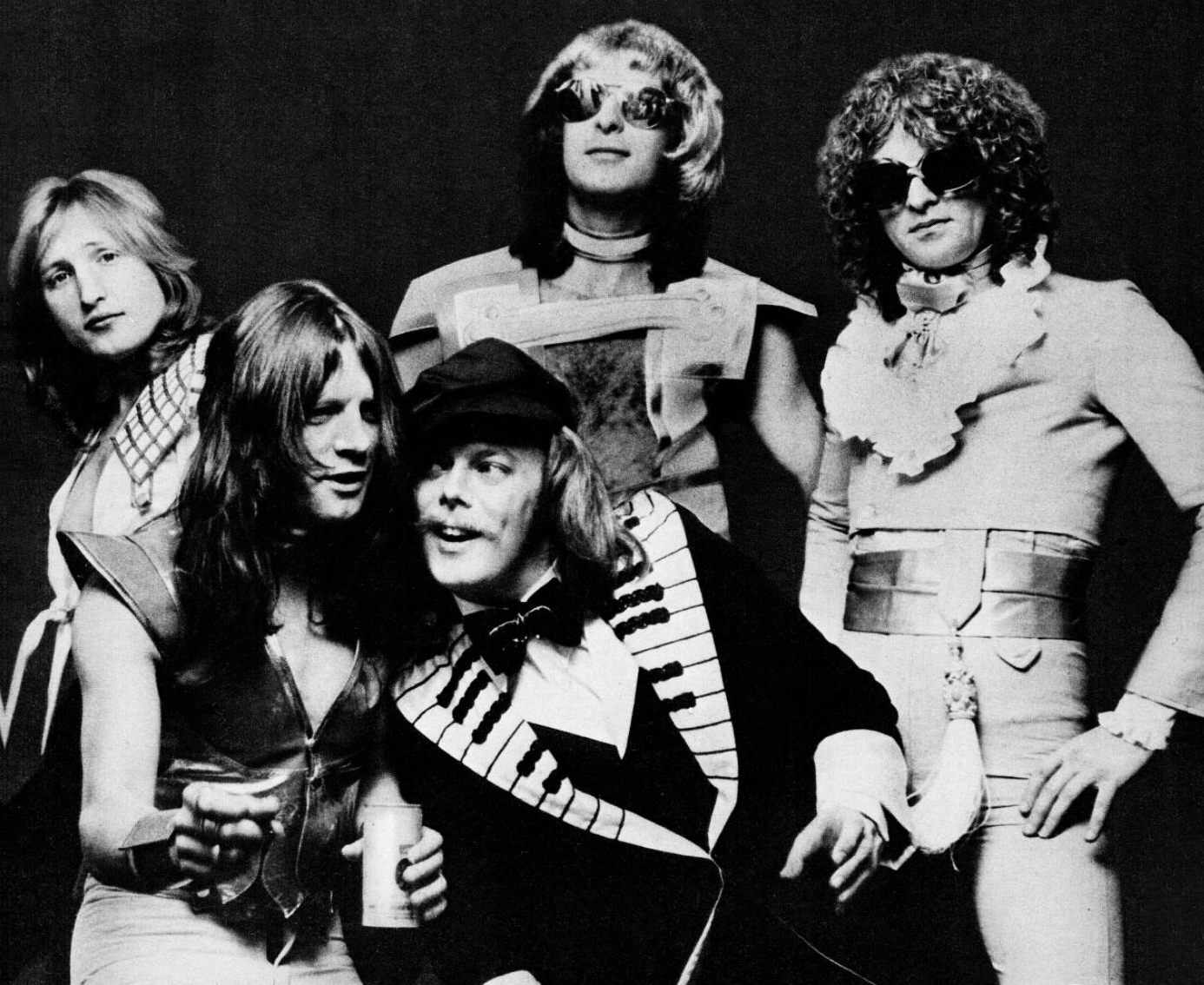
Fisher at bottom middle with Mott the Hoople in a 1974 trade ad

=== British Lions and Solo works: 1977–1980 ===
When Mott folded, Fisher invited Fiddler to join the remaining members of Mott in what would become British Lions. From 1977 to 1979 the Lions recorded two albums, and three singles: Kim Fowley's "International Heroes", Garland Jeffries' "Wild in the Streets", and Fiddler's own "One More Chance to Run".

In 1978 in his home studio in Notting Hill, Fisher started an intense two-year burst of activity with four iconoclastic solo projects, all released on the new indie label Cherry Red Records. 1979's Hybrid Kids – A Collection of Classic Mutants featured art-punk arrangements of hit songs, posing as a dozen indie bands, who were in fact, all Fisher, playing keys, bass, guitar and singing. A sequel, a Christmas album called Claws, came out in 1980. Fisher's first foray into ambient music came out the same year, the sublime Slow Music in which he looped and processed a performance by Lol Coxhill.

Also in 1980, Fisher conceived and produced Miniatures – a sequence of fifty-one tiny masterpieces album (51 one-minute tracks by Robert Fripp, Gavin Bryars, Michael Nyman, the Pretenders, XTC, Penguin Cafe Orchestra, Robert Wyatt, Ivor Cutler, the Damned, etc.) A sequel was released in 2000. Miniatures 2020 – a 40th anniversary tribute album produced by other artists – was released in 2021.

=== Touring with Queen and move to Japan: 1982–present ===
Burnt out after his two-year burst of solo recordings, Fisher took a few years break and travelled around Europe and Asia. After coming back to music, he played with Queen on their 1982 tour of Europe, the first time they added an extra musician to their live shows. Freddie Mercury can be seen humorously introducing him to the audience before the band's performance of "Crazy Little Thing Called Love", on the band's Queen on Fire – Live at the Bowl album.

After further travels, Fisher moved to Japan in 1984, where he quickly realised that he had found the new home base he had been searching for ever since leaving London. There, he started to make ambient and improvised music, as well as becoming a successful TV commercial music composer, including songs written or arranged for Cat Power, Karin Krog, José Feliciano, Zap Mama and Swing Out Sister. Japanese artists he has worked with include Yoko Ono, Dip in the Pool, the Boom, Heat Wave, Shoukichi Kina, and Haruomi Hosono from Yellow Magic Orchestra. He also scored the Japanese anime/live-action hybrid film Twilight of the Cockroaches (1987) and the documentary A Zen Life: D.T. Suzuki (2006).

Starting in November 2003, Morgan performed 100 monthly solo improvisation concerts at the cutting-edge arts/music club Superdeluxe, in Roppongi, Tokyo. He called this concert series "Morgan's Organ", and has started to release live recordings of the series as downloads. The series ended in March 2013 and has been continued as "Morgan's Organ at Home" at his personal studio in Tokyo since June 2013. There he also began to host a series of events at his own "Morgan Salon" room that he runs, inspired by the salon events in Paris in the 1920s, featuring creative individuals from other disciplines such as photography, poetry, Japanese traditional music, and sake-making.

In 2005, he collaborated with German musician Hans-Joachim Roedelius (of Cluster and Harmonia) on the ambient album Neverless (on the Klanggalerie label). Between 2014 and 2020, Fisher contributed to four albums by Tom Guerra. The fourth Guerra album, titled "Sudden Signs of Grace", was made in the midst of the worldwide COVID-19 pandemic. The video for the title track features guest appearances including Fisher and a number of rock notables, including Hilton Valentine, Dan Baird, Christine Ohlman, G.E. Smith, Alvin Youngblood Hart, Jeff Pevar, and Kenny Aaronson.

== Photography career ==
Fisher has maintained a lifelong interest in photography and in recent years has been holding an increasing number of solo exhibitions of his work in Japan and abroad. He has evolved a technique of abstract photography which he calls Light Art, influenced by the photograms of Man Ray and László Moholy-Nagy, by pendulum-created harmonographs, and in particular by the abstract cinema of Len Lye, Norman McLaren and Oskar Fischinger. Unlike most light paintings where images are created by "drawing" with flashlights in front of a camera with an open shutter, Fisher's light artworks are in the main created by moving the camera in front of various natural and man-made light sources (fireworks, sunlight on water, city illuminations, etc.).

Many of his light artworks may be seen at his website. Victor Magazine, a prestigious large-format hardback magazine produced by Hasselblad, included a 20-page feature on Morgan's light art in their 3rd issue, alongside a feature on David Lynch. His light art was featured in the booklet of his March 2009 album release Non Mon, a collection of his most well-known TV commercial compositions (Japan, DefSTAR/Sony Records).

=== Exhibitions ===
Fisher has held twenty solo exhibitions in Tokyo, and occasionally in the United States. These include:

- 1980 Institute of Contemporary Art, London
- 1987 NTT (Nippon Telephone) Gallery, Tokyo
- 1988 Roppongi Wave, Tokyo
- 1989 Striped House Gallery, Tokyo
- 2003 Uplink Gallery, Tokyo
- 2007 Superdeluxe, Tokyo
- 2007 Cool Train Gallery, Tokyo
- 2009 Superdeluxe, Tokyo
- 2010 Gallery Bauhaus, Tokyo
- 2010 Blue-T Gallery, Tokyo
- 2010 Gallery Cosmos, Tokyo
- 2011 Winfield Gallery, Carmel CA
- 2011 Fire King Cafe, Tokyo
- 2011 Gallery Box, Yokohama
- 2012 Foreign Correspondents' Club, Tokyo
- 2013 Hard Rock Hotel, Las Vegas
- 2013 Hasselblad Gallery
- 2014 Kid Ailack Art Hall, Tokyo
- 2015 Fire King Cafe, Tokyo
- 2019 Plate Tokyo

== Personal life ==
In the late 70s/early 80s, Fisher took a three-year "sabbatical", spending time in India, Belgium, and the US, studying meditation, vegetarianism and macrobiotics. This led to his 1984 move to Japan, where he still lives.

Fisher shared a flat with Mott the Hoople guitarist Mick Ralphs in Rusthall Avenue in Chiswick in 1973, then in 1976 moved to Canada Road, Acton, London and in 1978 to Linden Gardens in Notting Hill.

== Discography ==
=== Solo ===
- 1973 Centuri Maya Nexus
- 1979 Hybrid Kids 1
- 1980 Hybrid Kids – Claws: The Christmas Album
- 1983 Seasons
- 1984 Ivories
- 1984 Look at Life
- 1985 Inside Satie
- 1985 Water Music
- 1987 Flow Overflow
- 1987 Life Under the Floor: Soundtrack to "Twilight of the Cockroaches"
- 1988 Peace in the Heart of the City
- 1989 Outer Beauty, Inner Mystery
- 1990 Echoes of Lennon
- 1992 Re-Lax
- 1992 Re-Fresh
- 1992 Re-Charge
- 1994 Rebalance
- 1995 Refresh (new version)
- 1996 Relax (new version)
- 1996 Recharge (new version)
- 1998 Flower Music
- 1999 Peace in the Heart of the City (new version)
- 1999 Remix (remixed selections from Re series)
- 2005 Roedelius & Morgan Fisher – Neverless
- 2009 Non Mon
- 2011 The Great White Obi
- 2014 Heartmuse

==== Compilations ====
- 1980 Miniatures: A Sequence of Fifty-One Tiny Masterpieces
- 1998 Echoes of a City Life (selections from Life Under the Floor, Peace in the Heart of the City and Echoes of Lennon)
- 2000 Miniatures 2: A Sequence of Sixty Tiny Masterpieces

=== with Love Affair ===
- 1968 The Everlasting Love Affair
- 1971 New Day (credited to "LA")

=== with Morgan ===
- 1972 Nova Solis
- 1973 The Sleeper Wakes (a.k.a. Brown Out, unreleased until 1976)

=== with Mott the Hoople ===
- 1974 The Hoople
- 1974 Mott the Hoople Live

=== with Mott ===
- 1975 Drive On
- 1976 Shouting and Pointing

=== with British Lions ===
- 1978 British Lions
- 1980 Trouble with Women

=== with Lol Coxhill ===
- 1980 Lol Coxhill/Morgan Fisher – Slow Music

=== with Tiswas ===
- 1980 Tiswas Presents the Four Bucketeers

=== with the Witch Trials ===
- 1981 The Witch Trials [EP]

=== with John White ===
- 1983 Morgan Fisher/John White – Play Loud / Play Quiet

=== with Portmanteau ===
- 2013 Portmanteau (with Tatsuji Kimura & Toshiyuki Yasuda)

=== with Tom Guerra ===
- 2014 All of the Above
- 2016 Trampling Out the Vintage
- 2018 American Garden
- 2020 Sudden Signs of Grace

Citations
