= Pete Overend Watts =

English bass guitarist (1947-2017)

Peter Overend Watts
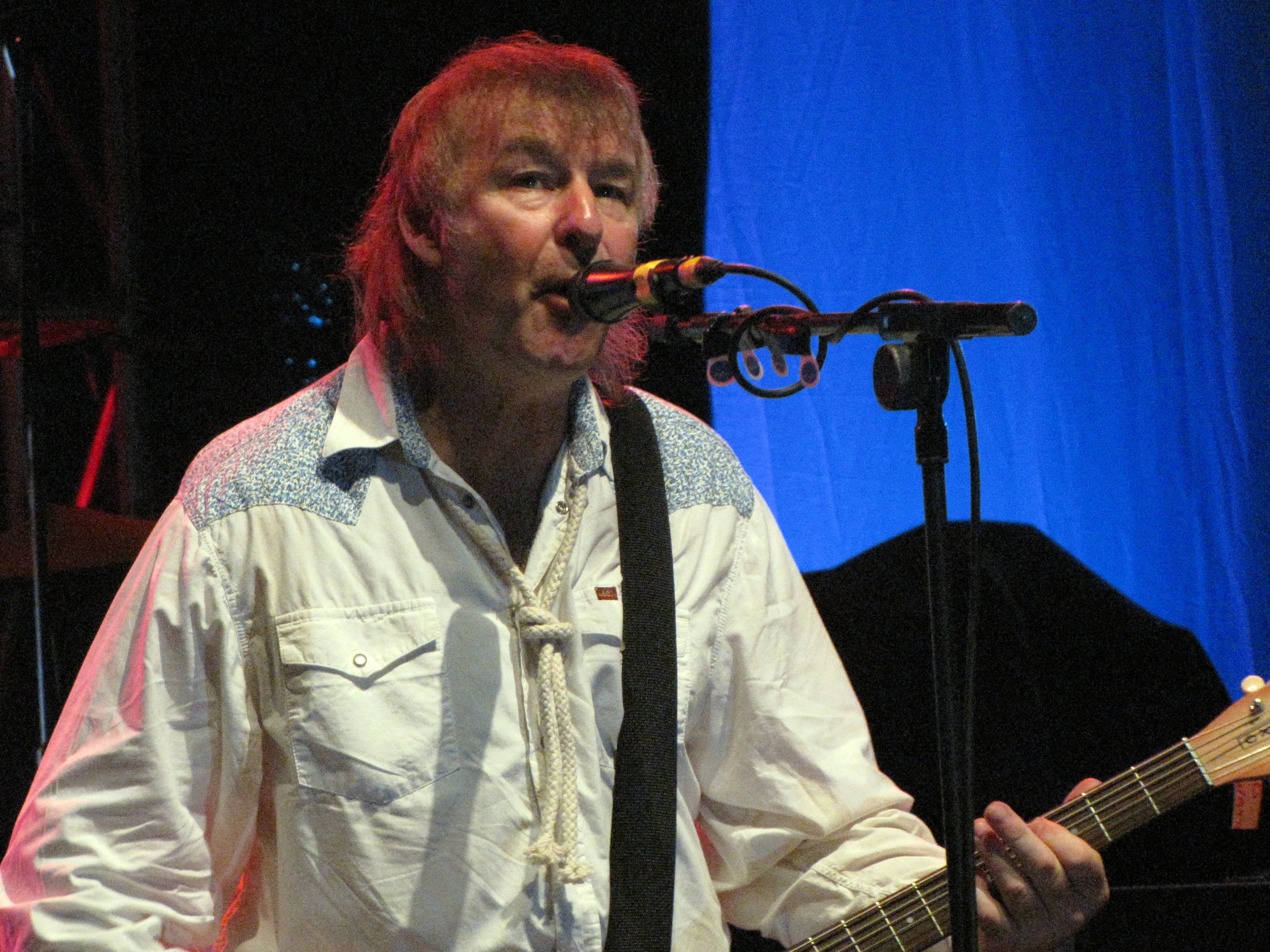
- Overend Watts performing with Mott the Hoople, reunion gig, Hammersmith Apollo, October 2009

Background information
- Born: Peter Overend Watts; 13 May 1947; Yardley, Birmingham, England
- Died: 22 January 2017 (aged 69)
- Genres: Rock; hard rock; glam rock
- Occupations: Musician; vocalist; record producer
- Instruments: Bass guitar; guitar; vocals
- Years active: 1969–2017
- Labels: Chrysalis; Island; Vertigo
- Formerly of: Mott the Hoople; British Lions

Peter Overend Watts (13 May 1947 – 22 January 2017) was an English bass guitar player and founding member of the 1970s rock band Mott the Hoople.

== Early life ==
Watts was born in Yardley, Birmingham on 13 May 1947. He moved as a child to Worthing, Sussex, and then to Ross-on-Wye, Herefordshire, where he started learning guitar while at Ross Grammar School. His middle name, Overend (which initially he did not use), came from that of a family ancestor.

== Career ==
Watts began playing the guitar at the age of 13 and by 1965, he had switched to bass guitar, and became a professional musician alongside Mick Ralphs in a group, the Buddies, that played in German clubs. The group later became the Doc Thomas Group, and then Shakedown Sound, before finally changing their name to Silence and settling in London in 1969. The group then added singer Ian Hunter, became Mott the Hoople, and, taking the advice of manager Guy Stevens, Pete Watts adopted the stage name Overend Watts. Watts played bass in Mott the Hoople's seven albums released between 1969 and 1974, and sang his own composition "Born Late '58" included in the band's seventh album, The Hoople (1974).

Following the departure of Ian Hunter and Mick Ralphs from the band in 1974, the remaining members of Mott the Hoople recruited relative unknowns Ray Major, on guitar, and Nigel Benjamin, on vocals. The name was abbreviated to Mott and a further two albums, Drive On (1975) and Shouting and Pointing (1976), were recorded with this line-up, before Benjamin quit.

Watts continued, with Dale "Buffin" Griffin, Morgan Fisher and Ray Major, in the Mott successor British Lions, recruiting former Medicine Head member John Fiddler. They released the albums British Lions, which reached No. 83 in the US (1977), and Trouble with Women (1982). He later became a record producer, producing albums for artists including Hanoi Rocks and Dumb Blondes.

Watts's bass of choice was a white Gibson Thunderbird, one of which was later sold to Wishbone Ash bassist Martin Turner.

=== Later career ===
In January 2009 it was confirmed that Watts and the other original members of Mott the Hoople would reform for three 40th anniversary reunion concerts in October 2009. The reunion at the HMV Hammersmith Apollo, London, England was extended to five shows due to popular demand.

In August 2009 American rock music group Mambo Sons released their double album Heavy Days featuring a song in tribute to him entitled "Overend Watts".

In November 2013 Mott the Hoople again reunited, with Martin Chambers once again sitting in (for an ailing Buffin) on drums, for a series of UK gigs in Birmingham, Glasgow, Newcastle and Manchester, before concluding at the o2 in London.

Before his death in 2017 Watts completed the solo album that he had said he would make for over a decade. Knowing that the album would be released after his death it would not be called "She’s Real Gone" as originally planned, but instead titled "He’s Real Gone".

== Death ==
Watts died on 22 January 2017 from throat cancer at the age of 69.

== Publication ==
Watts was known for his long-distance walks. His book, The Man Who Hated Walking, was published in 2013.
