= Dale Griffin =

English drummer (1948–2016)

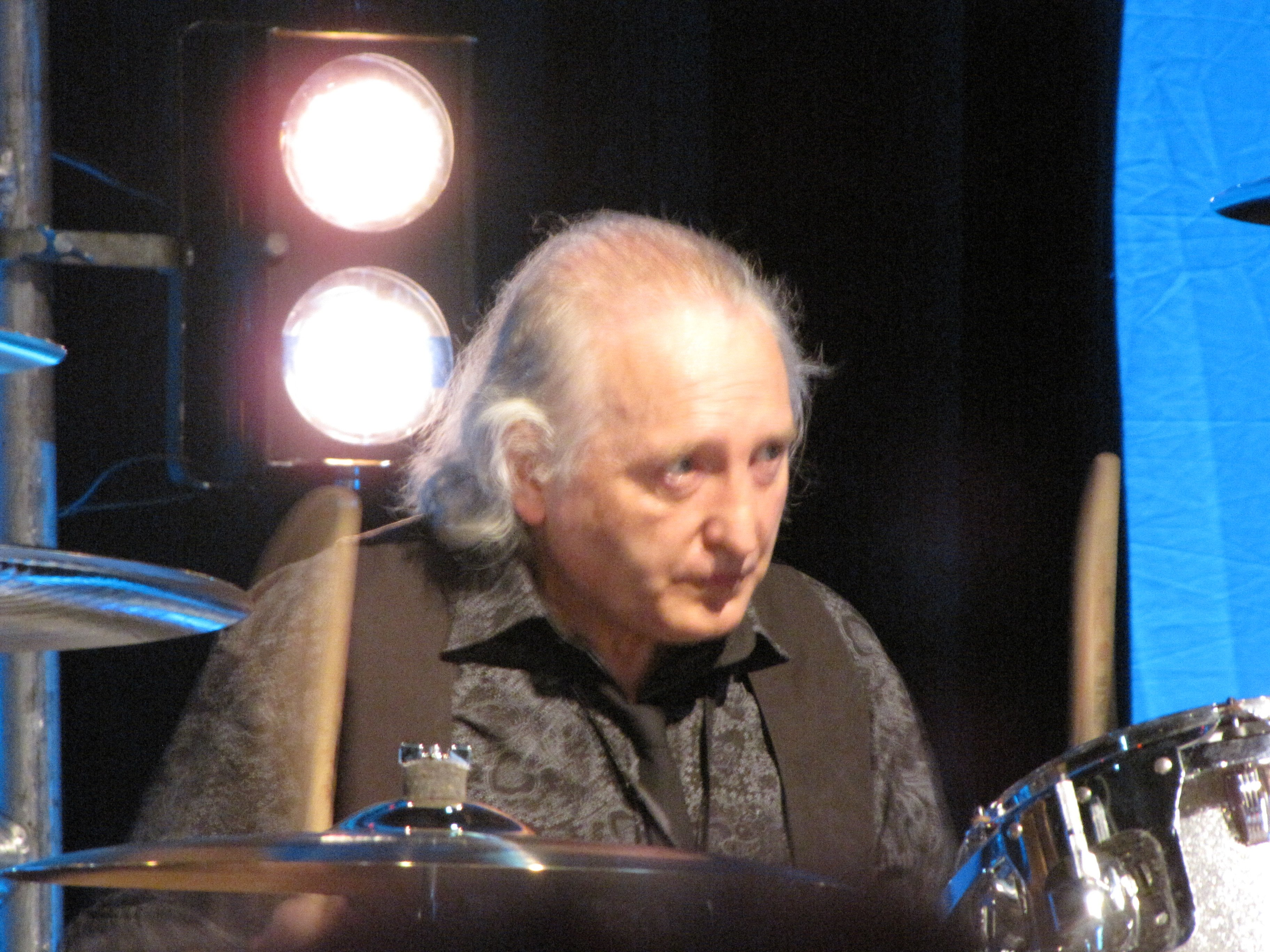
- Griffin performing in 2009

Background information
- Born: Terence Dale Griffin; 24 October 1948; Ross-on-Wye, Herefordshire, England
- Died: 17 January 2016 (aged 67)
- Genres: Rock; hard rock; glam rock
- Occupations: Drummer; vocalist; record producer
- Instrument: Drums
- Labels: Chrysalis; Island; Vertigo
- Formerly of: Mott the Hoople; British Lions

Terence Dale "Buffin" Griffin (24 October 1948 – 17 January 2016) was an English drummer and a founding member of 1970s rock band Mott the Hoople. Later, he worked as a producer, and produced many of the BBC Radio 1 John Peel sessions from 1981 to 1994.

== Life and career ==
Born in Ross-on-Wye, Herefordshire, Griffin attended Ross-on-Wye Grammar School. He played in local bands with future fellow Mott the Hoople member Overend Watts and it was during this time he gained the nickname "Buffin". Griffin's bands during this time included the Silence and the Charles Kingsley Creation. He appeared on two singles in 1966 by Yemm and the Yemen. Also in 1966, again with Watts and also with Mick Ralphs, Griffin played in the Doc Thomas Group. Successful in Italy, the group performed until the summer of 1968 when further changes of band personnel took place. Organist Verden Allen was added, and the group changed its name to the Shakedown Sound, then to Silence. In 1969, they moved to London, and with the addition of Ian Hunter, Mott The Hoople were formed in June 1969.

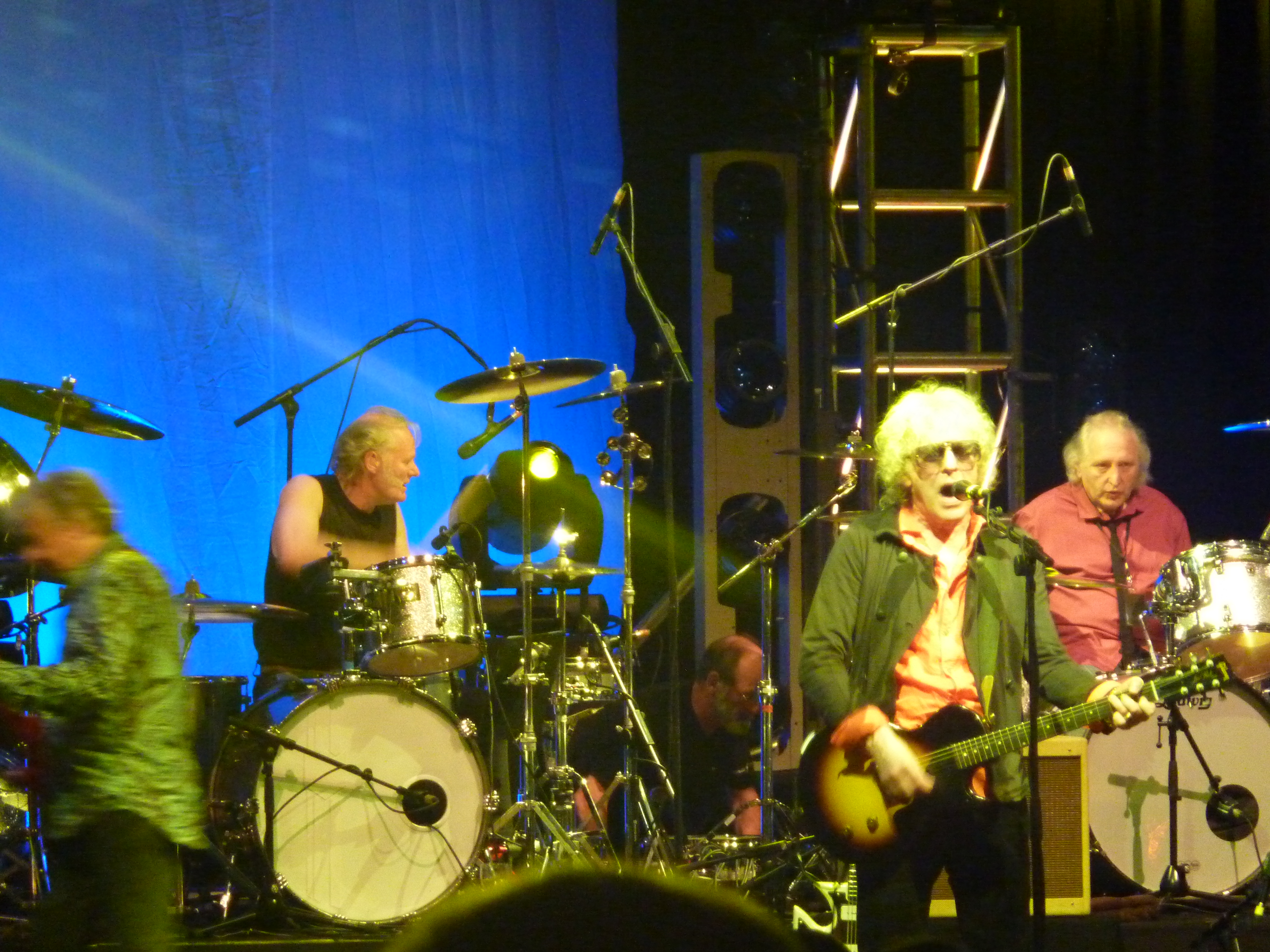
Griffin (right) with Mott the Hoople in 2009

Following the departure of Ian Hunter and Mick Ralphs, Griffin, along with Overend Watts and Morgan Fisher re-formed Mott with guitarist Ray Major and vocalist Nigel Benjamin. Following the departure of Benjamin in 1976 the remaining members regrouped as British Lions, with former Medicine Head member and songwriter John Fiddler, until their demise around 1978. During the 1980s, Griffin produced albums for Hanoi Rocks and The Cult, and the Department S hit, 'Is Vic There?', among others (such as New Model Army).

Griffin also produced numerous BBC Radio 1 John Peel sessions from 1981 to 1994. These included:

- The first professional recording session for Pulp in 1981.
- A session by The Smashing Pumpkins that included the track, "Girl Named Sandoz", which was featured on Pisces Iscariot (in the liner notes, Billy Corgan derisively referred to Griffin as 'Mott The Nipple' and 'Mott the Supple').
- An early session for Nirvana, which appeared on their Incesticide collection.
- A session for Carcass in 1989.
- A session for Orchestral Manoeuvres in the Dark in 1983.

Aged 58, Griffin was diagnosed with early-onset Alzheimer's disease. In January 2009 it was confirmed that Griffin and the other original members of Mott the Hoople would reform for three 40th anniversary reunion concerts in October 2009. Due to popular demand, the reunion was eventually extended to five shows. Having been diagnosed with Alzheimer's disease, Griffin only performed during the encores. The Pretenders drummer Martin Chambers, a fellow Herefordshire native and friend of the band, played the main set and also covered for Griffin on the 2013 tour.

Griffin died in his sleep on 17 January 2016 at the age of 67, exactly a week after former collaborator David Bowie died from cancer.

== See also ==
- Peel Sessions 1979–1983
- The Peel Sessions 1988–90
