= Paul Rodgers discography =

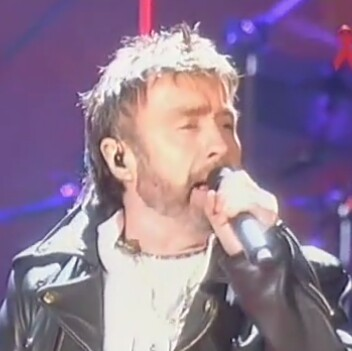
- Studio albums: 5
- Extended plays: 1
- Live albums: 7
- Singles: 3

The full list of Paul Rodgers' solo discography over the years. He has released 5 studio albums, 7 live albums, 1 EP and 3 singles.

== Albums ==
=== Studio albums ===
Year	Title	UK Albums Chart	US Billboard 200
1983	Cut Loose	—	135
1993	Muddy Water Blues: A Tribute to Muddy Waters	9	91
1997	Now	30	—
2000	Electric	—	—
2014	The Royal Sessions	58	81
2023	Midnight Rose	—	—

=== Live albums ===
Year	Title	UK Albums Chart
1996	Live: The Loreley Tapes	—
1997	Now and Live	—
2006	Extended Versions	—
2007	Live in Glasgow	—
2010	Live at Hammersmith Apollo 2009	—
2011	Paul Rodgers & Friends - Live at Montreux 1994	—
2018	Free Spirit	30

== EPs ==
Year	Title
1993	The Hendrix Set

== Singles ==
Year	Title	UK Singles Chart	US Bubbling Under	US Mainstream Rock	Album
1983	"Morning After the Night Before"	—	—	—	Cut Loose
1983	"Cut Loose"	—	2	15	Cut Loose
1993	"Muddy Water Blues"	45	—	—	Muddy Water Blues: A Tribute to Muddy Waters
1993	"The Hunter"	—	—	6	Muddy Water Blues: A Tribute to Muddy Waters
1996	"Soul of Love"	—	—	15	Now
1997	"All I Want Is You"	185	—	—	Now
2000	"Drifters"	—	—	33	Electric
2014	"I Thank You"	—	—	—	The Royal Sessions
