= List of Billboard Mainstream Rock number-one songs of the 1980s =

When introduced by Billboard in March 1981, the Mainstream Rock chart was entitled Top Tracks and designed to measure the airplay of songs being played on album-oriented rock radio stations. The chart has undergone several name changes over the years, first to Top Rock Tracks in September 1984 and then to Album Rock Tracks in April 1986. The chart was not called "mainstream" until 1996. The term "tracks" was used to distinguish itself from singles charts (such as the Billboard Hot 100) as songs played on rock radio were not always released as singles. When an established rock artist released a new album, for example, it was not uncommon for multiple songs from the album to become popular simultaneously.

The song that had the longest run atop the chart during the 1980s was "Start Me Up" by the Rolling Stones at 13 weeks from the beginning of September through the first week of December in 1981. No other song had a run of more than 10 weeks. Tom Petty (with and without the Heartbreakers) was the act with the most number ones during the 1980s with 6.

== Number-one songs ==
† – Number-one song of the year

Issue date	Song	Artist(s)	Weeks at number one (Note: Weeks spent at number one in this decade)	Ref
1981
March 21	"I Can't Stand It"	Eric Clapton	2	
April 4	"You Better You Bet"	The Who	5	
May 9	"The Waiting"	Tom Petty and the Heartbreakers	6	
June 20	"A Life of Illusion"	Joe Walsh	1	
June 27	"The Voice"	The Moody Blues	4	
July 25	"Urgent"	Foreigner	4	
August 22	"Burnin' for You"	Blue Öyster Cult	2	
September 5	"Start Me Up"	The Rolling Stones	13	
December 5	"Waiting for a Girl Like You"	Foreigner	1	
December 12	"Every Little Thing She Does Is Magic"	The Police	2	
December 26	"Harden My Heart"	Quarterflash	3	
1982
January 16	"Centerfold"	The J. Geils Band	3	
February 6	"I Love Rock and Roll"	Joan Jett	5	
March 13	"(Oh) Pretty Woman"	Van Halen	2	
March 27	"Don't Let Him Know"	Prism	1	
April 3	"867-5309/Jenny"	Tommy Tutone	3	
April 24	"Heat of the Moment"	Asia	5	
May 29	"No One Like You"	Scorpions	1	
June 5	"Stone Cold"	Rainbow	1	
June 12	"Heat of the Moment"	Asia	1	
June 19	"Hurts So Good"	John Cougar	1	
June 26	"Caught Up in You"	.38 Special	1	
July 3	"Eye of the Tiger"	Survivor	5	
August 7	"Think I'm in Love"	Eddie Money	3	
August 28	"Everybody Wants You"	Billy Squier	6	
October 9	"New World Man"	Rush	1	
October 16	"Dirty Laundry"	Don Henley	2	
October 30	"New World Man"	Rush	1	
November 6	"Dirty Laundry"	Don Henley	1	
November 13	"Shock the Monkey"	Peter Gabriel	2	
November 27	"Down Under"	Men at Work	2	
December 11	"You Got Lucky"	Tom Petty and the Heartbreakers	2	
December 25	"Down Under"	Men at Work	3	
1983
January 15	"You Got Lucky"	Tom Petty and the Heartbreakers	1	
January 22	"Hungry Like the Wolf"	Duran Duran	3	
February 12	"Twilight Zone"	Golden Earring	1	
February 19	"Separate Ways (Worlds Apart)"	Journey	4	
March 19	"Photograph"	Def Leppard	6	
April 30	"She's a Beauty"	The Tubes	5	
June 4	"Rock of Ages"	Def Leppard	1	
June 11	"Every Breath You Take"	The Police	9	
August 13	"Other Arms"	Robert Plant	1	
August 20	"Don't Cry"	Asia	1	
August 27	"King of Pain"	The Police	4	
September 24	"How Can I Refuse?"	Heart	1	
October 1	"King of Pain"	The Police	1	
October 8	"Suddenly Last Summer"	The Motels	2	
October 22	"Love Is a Battlefield"	Pat Benatar	2	
November 5	"Heart and Soul"	Huey Lewis and the News	1	
November 12	"Love Is a Battlefield"	Pat Benatar	2	
November 26	"Owner of a Lonely Heart"	Yes	4	
December 24	"If I'd Been the One"	.38 Special	4	
1984
January 21	"Jump"	Van Halen	8	
March 17	"Got a Hold on Me"	Christine McVie	2	
March 31	"A Fine, Fine Day"	Tony Carey	1	
April 7	"Against All Odds (Take a Look at Me Now)"	Phil Collins	1	
April 14	"You Might Think"	The Cars	3	
May 5	"Oh Sherrie"	Steve Perry	2	
May 19	"Run Runaway"	Slade	2	
June 2	"Magic"	The Cars	1	
June 9	"Dancing in the Dark"	Bruce Springsteen	6	
July 21	"No Way Out"	Jefferson Starship	1	
July 28	"The Warrior"	Scandal	1	
August 4	"Rock Me Tonite"	Billy Squier	2	
August 18	"The Warrior"	Scandal	1	
August 25	"Missing You"	John Waite	2	
September 8	"Are We Ourselves?"	The Fixx	2	
September 22	"On the Dark Side"	John Cafferty & The Beaver Brown Band	5	
October 27	"I Can't Hold Back"	Survivor	3	
November 17	"Run to You"	Bryan Adams	4	
December 15	"The Boys of Summer"	Don Henley	4	
1985
January 19	"I Want to Know What Love Is"	Foreigner	1	
January 26	"The Old Man Down the Road"	John Fogerty	3	
February 16	"Somebody"	Bryan Adams	2	
March 2	"Just Another Night"	Mick Jagger	2	
March 16	"Radioactive"	The Firm	1	
March 23	"All She Wants to Do Is Dance"	Don Henley	2	
April 6	"Forever Man"	Eric Clapton	2	
April 20	"Don't You (Forget About Me)"	Simple Minds	3	
May 11	"Trapped"	Bruce Springsteen & the E Street Band	3	
June 1	"Little by Little"	Robert Plant	2	
June 15	"Tough All Over"	John Cafferty & The Beaver Brown Band	2	
June 29	"If You Love Somebody Set Them Free"	Sting	3	
July 20	"The Power of Love"	Huey Lewis and the News	2	
August 3	"Money for Nothing"†	Dire Straits	3	
August 24	"Fortress Around Your Heart"	Sting	2	
September 7	"Lonely Ol' Night"	John Cougar Mellencamp	5	
October 12	"We Built This City"	Starship	1	
October 19	"You Belong to the City"	Glenn Frey	3	
November 9	"Sleeping Bag"	ZZ Top	2	
November 23	"Tonight She Comes"	The Cars	3	
December 14	"Talk to Me"	Stevie Nicks	2	
December 28	"Silent Running"†(1986)	Mike + The Mechanics	5	
1986
February 1	"Kyrie"	Mr. Mister	1	
February 8	"Stages"	ZZ Top	2	
February 22	"All the King's Horses"	The Firm	4	
March 22	"Addicted to Love"	Robert Palmer	2	
April 5	"Why Can't This Be Love"	Van Halen	3	
April 26	"Stick Around"	Julian Lennon	3	
May 17	"Like a Rock"	Bob Seger & The Silver Bullet Band	2	
May 31	"Sledgehammer"	Peter Gabriel	2	
June 14	"Invisible Touch"	Genesis	3	
July 5	"Secret Separation"	The Fixx	2	
July 19	"Higher Love"	Steve Winwood	4	
August 16	"Missionary Man"	Eurythmics	1	
August 23	"Throwing It All Away"	Genesis	3	
September 13	"In Your Eyes"	Peter Gabriel	1	
September 20	"Take Me Home Tonight"	Eddie Money	2	
October 4	"Emotion in Motion"	Ric Ocasek	1	
October 11	"Amanda"	Boston	3	
November 1	"Hip to Be Square"	Huey Lewis and the News	1	
November 8	"Don't Get Me Wrong"	The Pretenders	3	
November 29	"I Want to Make the World Turn Around"	Steve Miller Band	6	
1987
January 10	"It's in the Way That You Use It"	Eric Clapton	1	
January 17	"My Baby"	The Pretenders	2	
January 31	"Livin' on a Prayer"	Bon Jovi	2	
February 14	"Midnight Blue"†	Lou Gramm	5	
March 21	"I'm No Angel"	Gregg Allman Band	1	
March 28	"Come as You Are"	Peter Wolf	1	
April 4	"With or Without You"	U2	5	
May 9	"Jammin' Me"	Tom Petty and the Heartbreakers	4	
June 6	"Shakedown"	Bob Seger	4	
July 4	"Don't Mean Nothing"	Richard Marx	1	
July 11	"Give to Live"	Sammy Hagar	3	
August 1	"Touch of Grey"	Grateful Dead	3	
August 22	"Paper in Fire"	John Cougar Mellencamp	5	
September 26	"Learning to Fly"	Pink Floyd	3	
October 17	"Brilliant Disguise"	Bruce Springsteen	1	
October 24	"Love Will Find a Way"	Yes	3	
November 14	"Cherry Bomb"	John Cougar Mellencamp	1	
November 21	"Tunnel of Love"	Bruce Springsteen	4	
December 19	"Say You Will"	Foreigner	4	
1988 (Note: Van Halen's "Finish What Ya Started" peaked at number 2 on the Top Album Rock Tracks chart in August 1988 but was ranked number one on the year-end chart for 1988.)
January 16	"On the Turning Away"	Pink Floyd	1	
January 23	"Just Like Paradise"	David Lee Roth	4	
February 20	"Heaven Knows"	Robert Plant	6	
April 2	"I Wish I Had a Girl"	Henry Lee Summer	1	
April 9	"Tall Cool One"	Robert Plant	4	
May 7	"Only a Memory"	The Smithereens	1	
May 14	"The Valley Road"	Bruce Hornsby and the Range	3	
June 4	"Black and Blue"	Van Halen	3	
June 25	"Roll with It"	Steve Winwood	4	
July 23	"When It's Love"	Van Halen	1	
July 30	"Simply Irresistible"	Robert Palmer	3	
August 20	"Hate to Lose Your Lovin'"	Little Feat	4	
September 17	"Don't You Know What the Night Can Do?"	Steve Winwood	2	
October 1	"I'm Not Your Man"	Tommy Conwell & The Young Rumblers	1	
October 8	"Desire"	U2	5	
November 12	"It's Money That Matters"	Randy Newman	2	
November 26	"Orange Crush"	R.E.M.	2	
December 10	"Angel of Harlem"	U2	6	
1989
January 21	"Got It Made"	Crosby, Stills, Nash & Young	2	
February 4	"The Love in Your Eyes"	Eddie Money	1	
February 11	"Stand"	R.E.M.	1	
February 18	"Driven Out"	The Fixx	4	
March 18	"Working on It"	Chris Rea	1	
March 25	"I'll Be You"	The Replacements	3	
April 15	"Now You're in Heaven"	Julian Lennon	1	
April 22	"I Won't Back Down"	Tom Petty	5	
May 27	"The Doctor"	The Doobie Brothers	3	
June 17	"Rooms on Fire"	Stevie Nicks	1	
June 24	"Runnin' Down a Dream"	Tom Petty	1	
July 1	"The End of the Innocence"	Don Henley	4	
July 29	"Crossfire"	Stevie Ray Vaughan and Double Trouble	3	
August 19	"Let the Day Begin"	The Call	1	
August 26	"Free Fallin'"†	Tom Petty	1	
September 2	"Mixed Emotions"	The Rolling Stones	5	
October 7	"Love in an Elevator"	Aerosmith	2	
October 21	"Rock and a Hard Place"	The Rolling Stones	5	
November 25	"Pretending"	Eric Clapton	5	
December 30	"Show Don't Tell"	Rush	1	
