= Now (Paul Rodgers album) =

Studio album by Paul Rodgers
- Released: 17 June 1997
- Genre: Rock
- Length: 54:53
- Label: Ramshackle Music Limited
- Producer: Paul Rodgers, Eddie Kramer and Dan Priest

Paul Rodgers chronology
| Live: The Loreley Tapes (1996) | Now (1997) | Now & Live (1997) |

Singles from Now
- 1. "Soul of Love" Released: 1996; 2. "All I Want Is You" Released: 1997

Now is the third studio album by English rock musician Paul Rodgers, of Free and Bad Company fame. It is his second solo work of wholly original material, following 1993's covers album Muddy Water Blues.

The song "Saving Grace" was later re-recorded by Rodgers with Bad Company as one of two new studio recordings on their live album In Concert: Merchants of Cool. Jaz Lochrie plays bass on both recordings.

The album was later reissued as a part of 2-CDset, Now & Live, which packaged the album alongside Rodger's 1996 live recording Live: The Loreley Tapes.

== Track listing ==
All tracks are written by Paul Rodgers, except where noted.

| No. | Title | Writer(s) | Length |
|---|---|---|---|
| 1. | "Soul of Love" | | 4:51 |
| 2. | "Overloaded" | | 3:16 |
| 3. | "Heart of Fire" | | 4:13 |
| 4. | "Saving Grace" | Rodgers, Neal Schon, Geoff Whitehorn | 4:51 |
| 5. | "All I Want Is You" | | 5:33 |
| 6. | "Chasing Shadows" | | 4:43 |
| 7. | "Love Is All I Need" | | 5:57 |
| 8. | "Nights Like This" | | 5:19 |
| 9. | "Shadow of the Sun" | | 5:23 |
| 10. | "I Lost It All" | | 5:53 |
| 11. | "Holding Back the Storm" | Rodgers, Andrea Rodriguez | 4:54 |

Japanese edition bonus track
| No. | Title | Length |
|---|---|---|
| 8. | "Ride My Love" | 4:35 |

=== Album outtakes ===
1. "Soul of Love" (acoustic version) – Released as B-side to "Soul of Love"
2. "Shadow of the Sun" (acoustic version) – Released as B-side to "All I Want Is You"
3. "Ride Easy, Ride Slow" – Released as B-side to "All I Want Is You"

== Personnel ==
- Paul Rodgers - lead vocals, rhythm guitar on "Soul of Love", "Overloaded", "Chasing Shadows" and "Shadow of the Sun", 12-string guitar on "All I Want Is You" and "Holding Back the Storm", piano on "Love Is All I Need"
- Geoff Whitehorn - lead guitar, backing vocals
- Jaz Lochrie - bass, backing vocals
- Jim Copley - drums

with:

- Clive Brown and the Shekinah Singers - choir on "Love Is All I Need"
- Jennifer Phillips, Paul Boldeau - vocals on "Love Is All I Need"
- Dan Priest - tambourine on "Love Is All I Need"

== Charts ==
=== Singles ===
| Year | Single | Chart | Position |
|---|---|---|---|
| 1997 | "Soul Of Love" | Billboard Mainstream Rock Tracks | 15 |
