= Sanity (disambiguation) =

Sanity is the state of being of sound mind and therefore legally responsible for one's actions.

Sanity may also refer to:

- "Sanity" (song), a song by Killing Joke
- "Sanity", a song by Matt Brouwer from Imagerical
- Sanity (music store), an Australian entertainment retailer
- Sanity (professional wrestling), a professional wrestling faction in WWE
- Sanity: Aiken's Artifact, a 2000 video game developed by Monolith Productions
- Sanity check
- Sanity (software company), a Norwegian software company
