= Live: The Loreley Tapes =

Live: The Loreley Tapes......

Live album by Paul Rodgers
- Released: 1996
- Recorded: 8 July 1995 Rockpalast Open Air Festival, Freilichtbühne Loreley, St. Goarshausen, Germany
- Genre: Rock
- Label: SPV Recordings
- Producer: Paul Rodgers, Stephen Croxford

Paul Rodgers chronology
The Hendrix Set (1993)	Live: The Loreley Tapes...... (1996)	Now (1997)

Live: The Loreley Tapes...... is a live album by Paul Rodgers of Free and Bad Company fame. It was recorded at the Rockpalast Open Air Festival, at Freilichtbühne Loreley, St. Goarshausen, Germany on 8 July 1995 and released in 1996.

The album consists of blues standards previously covered by Rodgers on his solo album Muddy Water Blues: A Tribute to Muddy Waters, as well as several Free and Bad Company hits. The band Rodgers recruited for the concert – Geoff Whitehorn on guitar, Jaz Lochrie on bass and Jim Copley on drums – would go on to play on Rodgers' next two solo albums.

The album was later reissued as a part of 2-CD set, Now & Live, which packaged the album alongside Rodger's 1997 studio album Now.

== Track listing ==
No.	Title	Writer(s)	Length
1.	"Little Bit of Love"	Andy Fraser, Paul Rodgers, Simon Kirke, Paul Kossoff	4:28
2.	"Be My Friend"	Fraser, Rodgers	6:12
3.	"Feel Like Makin' Love"	Rodgers, Mick Ralphs	4:31
4.	"Louisiana Blues"	Muddy Waters	4:19
5.	"Muddy Water Blues"	Rodgers	4:58
6.	"Rollin' Stone"	Waters	10:13
7.	"I'm Ready"	Willie Dixon	3:33
8.	"Wishing Well"	Rodgers, Kirke, Tetsu Yamauchi, Kossoff, John Bundrick	4:28
9.	"Mr. Big"	Fraser, Rodgers, Kirke, Kossoff	5:28
10.	"Fire and Water"	Fraser, Rodgers	4:24
11.	"The Hunter"	Booker T. Jones, Carl Wells, Al Jackson Jr., Donald Dunn, Steve Cropper	6:36
12.	"Can't Get Enough"	Ralphs	4:07
13.	"All Right Now"	Fraser, Rodgers	7:26

== Personnel ==
- Paul Rodgers - vocals
- Geoff Whitehorn - guitars
- Jaz Lochrie - bass
- Jim Copley - drums
