= Cynthia Kereluk =

Canadian fitness and exercise guru (born 1960)

- Born: Cynthia Michele Kereluk; April 29, 1960 (age 66); Saskatoon, Saskatchewan, Canada
- Education: Okanagan College; Simon Fraser University
- Occupation: Former television host
- Spouse: Paul Rodgers (m. 2007)
- Beauty pageant titleholder
- Title: Miss Edmonton; Miss Canada 1984
- Years active: 1984-2000
- Hair color: Blonde
- Eye color: Blue
- Major competitions: Miss Edmonton 1984 (winner); Miss Canada 1984 (winner); Miss Universe 1984

Cynthia Michele Kereluk (/ˈkɜːrlʌk/ KURR-luk; born April 29, 1960) is a Canadian fitness model and beauty pageant titleholder. She won the title of Miss Canada 1984 and went on to compete in the Miss Universe 1984. From 1985 to 2000, she hosted the exercise program Everyday Workout.

== Early life and education ==
She is a native of Saskatoon and was adopted at birth. She was adopted by her mother, Elizabeth. Elizabeth went to the same church as Kereluk's biological mother, who was an unmarried teen when she gave birth. The family moved from Saskatoon to Vancouver, and, later, to Summerland in the Okanagan.

Elizabeth remained unmarried until Kereluk was 12 years old when she married Bud Kereluk, who worked as a carpenter. Cynthia is one of ten adopted siblings who had polio as a child and who she helped with recovery. Her adoptive mother looked after foster children and mentally handicapped adults.

Prior to obtaining her degree in education from Simon Fraser University (SFU), Kereluk attended Okanagan College for 3 years. In October 1982, she moved to Edmonton, Alberta.

Her interests include weightlifting, judo, and gymnastics. In her early years, she won two judo championships and further awards in poetry, story, and drama championships.

== Career ==
Kereluk worked as a teacher in Kelowna after completing her degree at SFU. Prior to entering the pageants, Kereluk worked as an aerobics instructor in Edmonton.

Kereluk won the title of Miss Edmonton. In 1984, she won the Miss Canada title and competed in Miss Universe 1984. From 1985 to 2000 she reached both a Canadian (CFRN) and American (Lifetime cable network) audience through television with her exercise program, Everyday Workout. At the time, Everyday Workout's sale to Lifetime was the second largest U.S. sale of an Edmonton-produced television program. Kereluk contributed the fitness program for Chantal Jakel and Denise Hamilton's 1999 cookbook, Fit to Cook.

Kereluk has had small parts in three movies; Mark of Cain (1985, aka Identity Crisis), The Pink Chiquitas (1986), and Overnight (1985 film).

== Personal life ==
On August 28, 2007 Kereluk married English rock singer-songwriter Paul Rodgers, best known for being a member of Free and Bad Company, as well as a member of The Firm and The Law. They married, after dating for ten years, at their home in British Columbia's Okanagan Valley.

== Filmography ==
Year	Title	Role	Notes
1985	Overnight	Patsy Seymour	
1986	Mark of Cain	Nurse	
1986	The Pink Chiquitas	Pink Chiquita	

Preceded by Jodi Yvonne Rutledge	Miss Canada; 1984	Succeeded by Karen Elizabeth Tilley
