= Radioactive (The Firm song) =

Single by The Firm

from the album The Firm
- B-side: "Together"
- Released: 1985
- Recorded: 1984
- Genre: Rock
- Length: 2:49
- Label: Atlantic
- Songwriter: Paul Rodgers
- Producers: Paul Rodgers, Jimmy Page

The Firm singles chronology
"Radioactive" (1985)	"Satisfaction Guaranteed" (1985)

Music video
- "Radioactive" on YouTube

"Radioactive" is a song by English rock band The Firm. It was the first single released from their eponymous debut album The Firm, where it was the fifth track. It was written by Paul Rodgers. Rodgers still performs this song during his solo sets and it appears on the 2007 Paul Rodgers: Live In Glasgow DVD.

== Background ==
A compact and straightforward rock song from the 1980s, structured with Tony Franklin's fretless bass hook at the beginning, combined with Jimmy Page's guitar scratch on the third line in the verse, Rodgers' reverbed vocal, and followed by a wah pedal inflected guitar solo. Chris Slade plays a steady drum beat throughout. On live performances, the song was introduced with a drum solo from Slade, leading into Franklin's opening bass line. Page utilized his Botswana brown 1953 Fender Telecaster guitar featuring a Parsons and White B-string bender on tour with this song.

Their self-titled album, appearing on Atlantic Records, cracked the Billboard Top 20 on the strength of this single. A music video to promote the song was filmed in October 1984. Jimmy Page broke with the past and participated in the recording for the music video and single, the first time he had done both since the late 1960s. Page can be seen miming to the recording with his famous red doubleneck 1971 Gibson EDS-1275 guitar. In March 1985, MTV began heavily promoting the video, although the track was a modest seller, reaching #28 in America and topping the Top Rock Tracks chart for one week. "Radioactive" was also released as a 12" single and limited-edition picture disc.

== Formats and track listings ==
1985 7" single (US: Atlantic 7-89586, UK: Atlantic A-9586)

- A. "Radioactive" (Rodgers) 2:49
- B. "Together" (Page, Rodgers) 3:54

1985 12" special mix edition (US: Atlantic 86896, UK: Atlantic A-9586T)

- A. "Radioactive (Special Mix)" (Rodgers) 5:52
- B1. "City Sirens (Live)" (Page, Edwards) 4:27
- B2. "Live in Peace (Live)" (Rodgers) 5:10

1985 12" single (UK: Atlantic A-9586TE)

- A1. "Radioactive (Special Mix)" (Rodgers) 2:49
- A2. "Together" (Page, Rodgers) 3:54
- B1. "City Sirens (Live)" (Page, Edwards) 2:01
- B2. "Live in Peace (Live)" (Rodgers) 5:05

1986 7" single reissue (US: Atlantic Oldies Series 7-84966)

- A. "Radioactive" (Rodgers) 2:49
- B. "All the King's Horses" (Rodgers) 3:16

== Charts ==
Chart (1985)	Peak position
Canada Top Singles (RPM)	75
UK Singles (Official Charts)	76
US Billboard Hot 100	28
US Mainstream Rock (Billboard)	1
US Radio & Records Top 40 Singles	27
US Cash Box Top 100 Singles	28

== Personnel ==
- Paul Rodgers – lead vocals, acoustic and electric guitars, production
- Jimmy Page – acoustic and electric guitars, production
- Tony Franklin – bass guitar, keyboards, synthesizer, backing vocals
- Chris Slade – drums and percussion

== See also ==
- List of Billboard Mainstream Rock number-one songs of the 1980s
