= Midnight Rose (album) =

Studio album by Paul Rodgers
- Released: September 22, 2023
- Recorded: 2022–2023
- Studios: Roper Recording, Peachland and The Warehouse, Vancouver
- Genre: Rock
- Length: 32:12
- Label: Sun Records
- Producers: Bob Rock, Cynthia Rodgers

Paul Rodgers chronology
Free Spirit (2018)	Midnight Rose (2023)

Singles from Midnight Rose
- 1. "Living it Up" Released: June 23; 2. "Take Love" Released: July 28

Midnight Rose is the seventh solo album by Paul Rodgers, of Free and Bad Company fame. It is his first album of original material since Electric (1999). It was recorded in 2022 and 2023 at Roper Recording in Peachland and Bryan Adams' studio, The Warehouse, in Vancouver.

The song "Take Love" was previously worked on and played live by Rodgers as part of the Queen + Paul Rodgers project, although a studio version ultimately never materialised from the group.

== Critical reception ==
Professional ratings
Aggregate scores
Source	Rating
Metacritic	65/100
Review scores
Source	Rating
PopMatters	6/10
Blues Rock Review	9.5/10}
Loudersound.com	3/5 stars

The album has received mixed reviews with Blues Rock Review praising it as "a totally satisfying set of eight rocking songs that demonstrate why Paul Rodgers is considered one of the best singer/songwriter/frontmen of the rock & roll genre." PopMatters awarded it 6/10 with Michael Elliot saying the album, "signals the return of one of rock's greatest voices, which remarkably has not diminished over the decades and remains as expressive and powerful as ever, even if the material doesn't always match those golden vocal cords." In a 3/5 review, Loudersound.com suggests that "there are flashes of brilliance – class acts will always be class acts – but there are also moments when one wonders bemusedly what the hell is going on here."

== Track listing ==
All tracks are written by Paul Rodgers except where noted.

No.	Title	Writer(s)	Length
1.	"Coming Home"		3:18
2.	"Photo Shooter"		3:42
3.	"Midnight Rose"	Cynthia Rodgers, Paul Rodgers	4:00
4.	"Living it Up"	Paul Rodgers, Rick Fedyk, Todd Ronning	3:06
5.	"Dance in the Sun"		3:49
6.	"Take Love"		4:20
7.	"Highway Robber"		5:05
8.	"Melting"		4:48

== Charts ==
Chart performance for Midnight Rose
Chart (2023)	Peak position
German Albums (Offizielle Top 100)	78
Scottish Albums (Official Charts)	7
Swiss Albums (Schweizer Hitparade)	46

== Personnel ==
As per PopMatters, and Blues Rock Review.

- Paul Rodgers - vocals
- Ray Roper - guitar
- Keith Scott - guitar
- Todd Ronning - bass guitar
- Rick Fedyk - drums
- Chuck Leavell - piano
- Chris Gestrin - organ
- Leslie Page - backing vocals
- Jimmy Mattingly - mandolin
- Johnny Ferreira - saxophone

Technical

- Bob Rock - producer
- Cynthia Rodgers - producer
- Ray Roper - engineer
- Todd Ronning - engineer
- Randy Staub - mixer
