= Brighter Than a Thousand Suns (album) =

Studio album by Killing Joke
- Released: 10 November 1986
- Recorded: October 1985; March 1986 ("Victory"), August 1986 ("A Southern Sky")
- Studios: Hansa Tonstudio, West Berlin, West Germany
- Genres: Post-punk; gothic rock; new wave
- Length: 41:17 (original vinyl release)
- Labels: E.G., Virgin
- Producers: Chris Kimsey; Stewart Levine; Chris Tsangarides

Killing Joke chronology
Night Time (1985)	Brighter Than a Thousand Suns (1986)	Outside the Gate (1988)

Singles from Brighter Than a Thousand Suns
- 1. "Adorations" Released: August 1986; 2. "Sanity" Released: October 1986

Brighter Than a Thousand Suns is the sixth studio album by English post-punk band Killing Joke, released in November 1986 by E.G. Records. It was their first album to be distributed through Virgin Records. It entered the UK Albums Chart at number 54 on 22 November 1986, staying for one week. It was produced by Chris Kimsey, who had recorded the band's previous album Night Time.

== Production ==
The majority of the album was recorded in West Berlin during October 1985 with returning producer Chris Kimsey. The band's stage keyboard player David Kovacevic recalls the recording sessions and time spent in Berlin as "wild". The track "Victory" was recorded months later in March 1986, along with "Ecstasy" (the B-side to the Adorations single release), produced by Stewart Levine. The last track to be produced was "A Southern Sky" in August 1986, produced by Chris Tsangarides.

The album, with the exception of "A Southern Sky", was originally mixed by Chris Kimsey. However, E.G. Records requested that all of Kimsey's mixes (bar "Twilight of the Mortal") be replaced with new mixes by Julian Mendelsohn for more commercial appeal, against the wishes of the band. It was these replacement mixes which were ultimately released, with prominent reverb and the guitars and rhythm section generally mixed lower. Some songs were significantly altered, such as extending "Victory" from its original 4 minutes to over 7 in the style of a 12" remix.

== Promotion and release ==
Prior to the album's release, the band was booked to headline the first day of the Reading Festival on 22 August 1986. During their set, the band premiered most of the forthcoming album to the UK audience.

The album was announced for November. Upon release, the vinyl contained only 8 tracks due to the limited runtime of LP records, while the cassette and CD versions both contained 11, each with a slightly different running order, as detailed below. The album was a commercial failure as it only reached number 54 in the UK Albums Chart and stayed in the UK top 100 for just one week.

In 2008 at the request of the band, Chris Kimsey's original mixes were restored when the album was remastered for CD. The reissue also features bonus tracks, including the B-side "Ecstasy". The verse riff from "Ecstasy" was reused on the track "Obsession" from Killing Joke's next album, Outside the Gate.

== Reception ==
Professional ratings
Review scores
Source	Rating
AllMusic	2/5 stars
Encyclopedia of Popular Music	3/5 stars
The Great Rock Discography	6/10
MusicHound Rock	3/5
PopMatters	6/10
Record Mirror	5/5
The Rolling Stone Album Guide	3/5 stars
Select	3/5
Sounds	3/5 stars
Sputnikmusic	3.5/5

Brighter Than a Thousand Suns has received a mixed response from music critics. Ned Raggett of AllMusic retrospectively wrote, "Chris Kimsey's production, effective on that earlier album [1985's Night Time], here combines with Julian Mendelsohn's mixing to result too often in blanded-out album rock throwaways". Adrien Begrand of PopMatters wrote in 2008, "Brighter Than a Thousand Suns marked a sharp decline in quality, many viewing it as a complete betrayal of Killing Joke's signature sound, but more than 20 years later, it's surprising how well parts of the album hold up [...] the hooks are undeniable." He goes on to note that the restored Kimsey mix on the 2008 re-issue "blows the old, overpolished mix out of the water."

== Track listing ==
Original vinyl version

All tracks are written by Killing Joke (Jaz Coleman, Geordie Walker, Paul Raven and Paul Ferguson).

Side A
No.	Title	Length
1.	"Adorations"	4:39
2.	"Sanity"	4:44
3.	"Chessboards"	5:47
4.	"Twilight of the Mortal"	4:12

Side B
No.	Title	Length
1.	"Love of the Masses"	4:54
2.	"A Southern Sky"	4:25
3.	"Wintergardens"	5:24
4.	"Rubicon"	7:06

Original cassette version

Side A
No.	Title	Length
1.	"Adorations"
2.	"Sanity"
3.	"Chessboards"
4.	"Goodbye to the Village"
5.	"Wintergardens"
6.	"Twilight of the Mortal"

Side B
No.	Title	Length
1.	"Love of the Masses"
2.	"A Southern Sky"
3.	"Victory"
4.	"Exile"
5.	"Rubicon"

Original CD version

No.	Title	Length
1.	"Adorations"	4:42
2.	"Sanity"	4:45
3.	"Chessboards"	5:51
4.	"Twilight of the Mortal"	4:15
5.	"Love of the Masses"	4:40
6.	"A Southern Sky"	4:39
7.	"Victory"	7:11
8.	"Wintergardens"	5:24
9.	"Rubicon"	7:03
10.	"Goodbye to the Village"	5:26
11.	"Exile"	6:38

2008 reissue bonus tracks
No.	Title	Length
12.	"Ecstasy"	4:10
13.	"Adorations" (Supernatural Mix)	6:39
14.	"Sanity" (Insane Mix)	6:15

== Personnel ==
Killing Joke

- Jaz Coleman – vocals, keyboards
- Kevin "Geordie" Walker – guitar
- Paul Raven – bass guitar
- Paul Ferguson – drums, vocals

Technical

- Chris Kimsey – production, mixing
- Thomas Stiehler – engineering
- Chris Tsangarides – production on "A Southern Sky"
- Bob Kraushaar – mixing on "A Southern Sky"
- Stewart Levine – production on "Victory"
- Glenn Skinner – engineering on "Victory"
- Julian Mendelsohn – remixing (original release only)
- Marion Schult – photography
- Cindy Palmano – photograph of Raven
- Stylorouge – sleeve design
- Alex Zander – crew
- Fil. E. – crew

== Charts ==
Chart (1986)	Peak position
UK Albums Chart	54
U.S. Billboard 200	194
