= America (Killing Joke song) =

Song by Killing Joke

Single by Killing Joke

from the album Outside the Gate
- A-side: "America"
- B-side: "Jihad"
- Released: 18 April 1988
- Genre: New wave, synthpop
- Length: 3:44
- Label: E.G. Records
- Songwriters: Jaz Coleman; Kevin "Geordie" Walker
- Producers: Jaz Coleman; Kevin "Geordie" Walker

Killing Joke singles chronology
"Sanity" (1986)	"America" (1988)	"My Love of This Land" (1988)

Killing Joke CD singles chronology
""America"" (1988)	""Money is Not Our God"" (1991)

"America" is Killing Joke's first single from their seventh studio album, Outside the Gate. It was released by E.G. Records on 18 April 1988. It was the first official single by Killing Joke to be self-produced, after the departure of producer Chris Kimsey.

The single was accompanied by a satirical music video depicting Jaz Coleman as a presidential candidate and dressed as Uncle Sam, in a dystopian scene of the United States.

"America" charted at No. 77 on the UK Singles Chart.

== Track listings ==
The song was first released as a 7" single with "Jihad" as the B-side. It was also released as a 12" single in the UK and Germany, featuring "America (The Extended Mix)" as the A-side, and "Jihad" and a remix of "America" by Glenn Skinner on the B-side.

This was the first single by Killing Joke to be released as a CD maxi single, featuring the Glenn Skinner remix of "America", "Jihad (Beyrouth Edit)", "America (The Extended Mix)" and the original 1980 remix of "Change".

=== 7" single ===
Side A

1. "America" – 03:47

Side B

1. "Jihad" – 06:00

=== 12" single ===
Both versions of "America" were mixed by Glenn Skinner.

Side A

1. "America (The Extended Mix)" – 06:45

Side B

1. "Jihad" – 05:26
2. "America" – 03:44

=== CD maxi single ===
Both versions of "America" were mixed by Glenn Skinner.

1. "America" – 03:44
2. "Jihad (Beyrouth Edit)" – 05:08
3. "America (The Extended Mix)" – 06:45
4. "Change (Original 1980 Mix)" – 04:00

== Charts ==
Year	Chart	Peak Position
1988	UK Singles Chart	77
