= Outside the Gate =

Studio album by Killing Joke
- Released: 27 June 1988
- Recorded: July–August 1987
- Studios: The Whitehouse (London); Abbey Road Studios (London)
- Genres: New Romantic; synth-pop
- Length: 38:00 (original release); 50:32 (reissue with bonus tracks)
- Labels: E.G., Virgin
- Producers: Jaz Coleman; Geordie Walker

Killing Joke chronology
Brighter Than a Thousand Suns (1986)	Outside the Gate (1988)	The Courtauld Talks (1989)

Singles from Outside the Gate
- 1. "America" Released: 18 April 1988; 2. "My Love of this Land" Released: 4 July 1988

Outside the Gate is the seventh studio album by English post-punk band Killing Joke, released in June 1988 by E.G. via Virgin Records worldwide. It was a significant musical departure for the band, with complex, orchestra influenced synthesiser arrangements and less prominent guitar. Tensions within the band surfaced during production, leading to drummer Paul Ferguson being dismissed and bassist Paul Raven also leaving. The lead single was "America".

== Production ==
In 1987, Killing Joke singer Jaz Coleman and guitarist Geordie Walker embarked on a project to record and self-produce new material, with tempos and time signatures determined using gematria. It also featured prominent synthesised instrumentation from Coleman, who was keen to use the symphonic techniques he had learned in his recent classical composition training.

Drummer Paul Ferguson later claimed that Outside the Gate actually began as a solo project by Coleman. In an interview given in 2016, he stated that costs mounted during production, leading to the record label insisting that the project become a Killing Joke album, though he and Raven did not participate in the writing.

Ferguson was initially invited to record live drums to the material but, according to Coleman, was fired because he was unable to perform the complex timings; this version of events was disputed by Paul Raven. According to Ferguson, he "couldn’t listen" to the existing synthesiser arrangements and asked that they be muted for him to record to the guitar only. His resulting performance didn't align with the arrangements once unmuted, and the ensuing tensions between Ferguson and Jaz resulted in his leaving Killing Joke altogether. Raven also left after recording bass for the album and asked for his name to be removed from the credits, purportedly calling Coleman and Walker "a pair of ego-strokers".

Session player Jimmy Copley was ultimately brought in to re-record the drums. Jeff Scantlebury had also performed additional percussion.

A picture collage of Coleman and Walker appears on the album sleeve and the pair promoted the album with no other band members. In an interview for MTV in the UK, in May 1988, the pair stated their intention to support Outside the Gate with a tour. Coleman also stated of the album's new style that they "wanted a more articulate funky powerful rhythm" and that "as long as [he is] alive and as long as Geordie is alive, Killing Joke is alive."

== Release and critical reception ==
Professional ratings
Review scores
Source	Rating
AllMusic	2/5 stars
The Encyclopedia of Popular Music	2/5 stars
PopMatters	2/10
MusicHound Rock	1/5 stars
Select	1/5 stars

Outside the Gate was not released until 27 June 1988 and entered the UK Albums Chart at number 92, staying for just one week. It was panned by critics. Sounds said of the album: "It's a stodgy, inconclusive LP that fails in all but the most basic of senses to achieve its end, leaving us feeling soured and unimpressed". NME shared the same point of view and depicted it as "a private breakfast of ideas, depicting poor old Jaz wading through quicksand with his jeans rolled down yet again. Worse ... he seems to be wandering off in exactly the same direction". Retrospective reviews have remained largely negative; David Jeffries of AllMusic said that "pallid synths poorly imitate orchestras, the complex song structures are just tedious, Coleman acts as if he's Freddie Mercury and David Bowie mashed together, and none of the throb, thunder or heavy riffage so important to the Killing Joke name is to be found." Adrien Begrand of PopMatters called it simply "disastrous".

The album was not released in the USA, nor was any material from the album ever performed live. Two singles, "America" and "My Love of This Land", were released but did little to improve its fortunes. The video for the former song featured Coleman and Walker along with drummer Copley and session bassist Jerome Rimson, who did not actually record or play live with the band.

Due to poor sales, Virgin dropped the group two months after the release of the album. In 2008, the album was re-released with bonus tracks, including rough mixes of some songs. The previously unreleased track "May Day" was re-written as parts of "The Calling" and "Tiahuanaco" for the final album. The original release was dedicated to Conny Plank, who had produced several Killing Joke records, after his death in 1987. The 2008 reissue was dedicated to Raven, following his death the previous year.

== Track listing ==
All tracks are written by Jaz Coleman and Geordie Walker.

Side A
No.	Title	Length
1.	"America"	3:47
2.	"My Love of This Land"	4:13
3.	"Stay One Jump Ahead"	3:10
4.	"Unto the Ends of the Earth"	6:08

Side B
No.	Title	Length
1.	"The Calling"	4:45
2.	"Obsession"	3:35
3.	"Tiahuanaco"	3:27
4.	"Outside the Gate"	8:47

CD bonus tracks
No.	Title	Length
9.	"America" (Extended Mix)	6:47
10.	"Stay One Jump Ahead" (Extended Mix)	5:46

2008 CD reissue bonus tracks
No.	Title	Length
9.	"May Day"	3:50
10.	"My Love of This Land" (Early Version)	4:16
11.	"Obsession" (Early Version)	3:48
12.	"Unto the Ends of the Earth" (Instrumental)	6:07
13.	"Jihad"	6:03
14.	"America" (Extended Mix)	6:47
15.	"Stay One Jump Ahead" (Dub)	3:30

== Personnel ==
Killing Joke

- Jaz Coleman – vocals, keyboards, piano, production
- Kevin "Geordie" Walker – guitar, bass guitar, production
- Paul Raven – bass guitar (uncredited)

Additional personnel

- Jimmy Copley – drums
- Jeff Scantlebury – percussion

Technical

- Martin Rex – recording engineer
- Glenn Skinner – mixing
- Bill Smith Studio – sleeve design
- Fil Le Gonidec – crew

== Charts ==
Year	Chart	Peak position
1988	UK Albums Chart	92
