= Mean Business =

Studio album by The Firm
- Released: 3 February 1986
- Recorded: 1985
- Genre: Rock
- Length: 39:20
- Label: Atlantic
- Producers: Jimmy Page, Paul Rodgers and Julian Mendelsohn

The Firm chronology
| The Firm (1985) | Mean Business (1986) |

Professional ratings
Review scores
| Source | Rating |
|---|---|
| AllMusic | 2.5/5 stars |
| Rolling Stone | (unfavorable) |

Mean Business is the second and final studio album by The Firm, released by Atlantic Records on 3 February 1986. Repeating the same bluesy formula as on the first album, The Firm (1985), Mean Business did not achieve the same commercial success.

One of the album's tracks, "Live in Peace", was first recorded on Paul Rodgers' first solo album in 1983, Cut Loose. The versions differ in that Chris Slade played the drums at half tempo compared to the original version, apart from the ending. Paul Rodgers has recently played a new version on his new compilation album Live in Peace.

The album's title was intended to have a double meaning: that the music business is a hard one, and that the band was serious about its music ("The Firm mean business"). Following the album's release and a brief supporting tour, Page and Rodgers disbanded the Firm, believing that it had served its purpose.

The album peaked at #22 on the Billboard 200 albums chart. and at #46 on the UK Albums Chart. The single "All the King's Horses" spent four weeks at the top of Billboard's Mainstream Rock Tracks chart.

"Fortune Hunter" was originally co-written by Page and Chris Squire for the aborted XYZ project in 1981. Squire was not credited on The Firm's version.

== Track listing ==
1986 vinyl edition & 1986 Compact disc edition Side one
| No. | Title | Writer(s) | Length |
|---|---|---|---|
| 1. | "Fortune Hunter" | Jimmy Page, Paul Rodgers, Chris Squire (uncredited) | 5:00 |
| 2. | "Cadillac" | Page, Rodgers | 5:57 |
| 3. | "All the King's Horses" | Rodgers | 3:16 |
| 4. | "Live in Peace" (cover of Paul Rodgers solo song from Cut Loose) | Rodgers | 5:05 |

Side two
| No. | Title | Writer(s) | Length |
|---|---|---|---|
| 1. | "Tear Down the Walls" | Page, Rodgers | 4:43 |
| 2. | "Dreaming" | Tony Franklin | 6:00 |
| 3. | "Free to Live" | Page, Rodgers | 4:13 |
| 4. | "Spirit of Love" | Rodgers | 5:06 |

== Personnel ==
=== Band ===
- Paul Rodgers – vocals, acoustic and electric guitars, piano, producer
- Jimmy Page – acoustic and electric guitars, producer
- Tony Franklin – fretless bass, keyboards, synthesizer, rhythm guitar on "Dreaming", vocals
- Chris Slade – drums and percussion

=== Other ===
- Julian Mendelsohn – producer
- Aubrey Powell Productions – cover design
- Barry Diament – mastering

== Charts ==
| Chart (1986) | Peak position |
|---|---|
| Canada Top Albums/CDs (RPM) | 37 |
| Swedish Albums (Sverigetopplistan) | 43 |
| UK Albums (Official Charts) | 46 |
| US Billboard 200 | 22 |
