= British Rock Symphony =

2000 studio and live album combined

Studio album / live album by Roger Daltrey, Darlene Love, Alice Cooper, Paul Young, Ann Wilson, Simon Townshend, Gary Brooker, Eric Clapton
- Released: 2000
- Recorded: 1999
- Genre: Rock
- Length: DVD – 88:00
- Label: DVD – Image Entertainment

Alternative cover

The British Rock Symphony was a tour that featured classic rock hits presented by a gospel choir, a full orchestra and vocalists including: Roger Daltrey, Darlene Love, Nikki Lamborn, Alice Cooper, Paul Young, Simon Townshend and Gary Brooker. Geoff Whitehorn played guitar and Zak Starkey performed on drums with Jaz Lochrie on Bass guitar. Studio recordings were issued on CD and cassette tape in 1999, and a video of live recordings from the tour in both VHS and DVD formats was issued in 2000. Eric Clapton and Ann Wilson appeared on the CD, but were not present on the tour DVD.

The tour was organized by producer David Fishof and launched at the Royal Albert Hall in London on 28 June 1999. After appearing at several venues in the UK, the tour continued in Europe and the United States. The tour program included music of The Who, The Rolling Stones, The Beatles, Led Zeppelin and Procol Harum.

== Track listing ==
1. "Jumpin' Jack Flash"
2. "Imagine"
3. "Blackbird"
4. "Come Together"
5. "Kashmir"
6. "Norwegian Wood (This Bird Has Flown)"
7. "Street Fighting Man"
8. "Start Me Up"
9. "5:15"
10. "Ruby Tuesday"
11. "Stairway to Heaven"
12. "Conquistador"
13. "A Whiter Shade of Pale"
14. "Let It Be"
15. "Pinball Wizard"
16. "You Better You Bet"
17. "Who Are You"
18. "A Little Help From My Friends"
