= Adorations =

Song by Killing Joke

Single by Killing Joke

from the album Brighter than a Thousand Suns
- A-side: "Adorations (The Extended Mix)"
- B-side: "Exile"; "Ecstasy (The Extended Mix)"
- Released: August 1986
- Genre: Post-punk, new wave, cold wave
- Length: 17:39 (maxi single); 4:39 (album version)
- Label: E.G. Records; Virgin Records; Virgin Schallplatten GmbH
- Songwriters: Jaz Coleman; Kevin "Geordie" Walker; Paul Raven; Paul Ferguson
- Producers: Chris Kimsey; Stewart Levine

Killing Joke singles chronology
"Kings and Queens" (1985)	"Adorations" (1986)	"Sanity" (1986)

Killing Joke cassette singles chronology
"Adorations (The Cassette Maxi Single)" (1986)	"Sanity (The Cassette Maxi Single)" (1986)

"Adorations" is Killing Joke's first single from their sixth studio album, Brighter than a Thousand Suns, released in August 1986. All of the releases were mixed by Julian Mendelsohn and Zeus B. Held, and produced by Chris Kimsey and Stewart Levine.

The single was accompanied by a music video of the band performing the song in a cathedral.

== Track listings ==
"Adorations" was released in several versions including remixes. The 7" vinyl single, released in the UK, France, and Spain, was a shorter edit of "Adorations", with "Exile" (also from Brighter Than A Thousand Suns) as its B-side. The 12" featured an extended mix as its A-side, with "Exile" and an extended mix of "Ecstasy" on the B-side.

"Adorations (The Supernatural Mix)" was released on 12" vinyl in the UK and featured "Love Like Blood (The '86 Remix)" and "Exile" as B-sides.

E.G. also released a 7" limited-edition double vinyl single exclusively in the UK featuring the remix of "Adorations" as the A-side, "Exile" as the B-side, "Ecstasy" as the C-side, and "Adorations (Instrumental Mix)" as the D-side. A cassette maxi single was also released.

=== 7" single ===
Side A

1. "Adorations" – 04:09 (Note: Mixed by Julian Mendelsohn)

Side B

1. "Exile" – 06:09

=== Limited double 7" single ===
Side A

1. "Adorations" – 04:38 (Note: Produced by Chris Kimsey)

Side B

1. "Exile" – 06:04

Side C

1. "Ecstasy" – 04:08 (Note: Produced by Stewart Levine)

Side D

1. "Adorations (Instrumental Mix)" – 04:02 (Note: Mixed by Zeus B. Held)

=== 12" Extended Mix ===
Side A

1. "Adorations (The Extended Mix)" – 05:08

Side B

1. "Exile" – 6:04
2. "Ecstasy (The Extended Mix)" – 06:27

=== 12" Supernatural Mix ===
Side A

1. "Adorations (The Supernatural Mix)" – 06:34

Side B

1. "Love Like Blood (The '86 Remix)" – 06:17
2. "Exile" – 06:02

=== Cassette Maxi single ===
Side one

1. "Adorations (The Supernatural mix)" – 06:41
2. "Ecstasy" – 04:10

Side two

1. "Exile" (06:09
2. "Love Like Blood (The '86 Remix)" – 06:29

== Charts ==
Year	Chart	Peak Position
1986	UK Singles Chart	42
