= The Firm (album) =

Studio album by The Firm
- Released: 22 February 1985
- Recorded: 1984
- Studios: Sol Studios, Cookham, Berkshire, England. Mixed at Sol Studios. Mastered at The Townhouse, London, England.
- Genre: Rock
- Length: 40:19
- Label: Atlantic
- Producers: Jimmy Page, Paul Rodgers

The Firm chronology
The Firm (1985)	Mean Business (1986)

Jimmy Page chronology
Whatever Happened to Jugula? (1985)	The Firm (1985)	Mean Business (1986)

Singles from The Firm
- 1. "Radioactive" Released: 1985; 2. "Closer" Released: 1985; 3. "Satisfaction Guaranteed" Released: 1985

Professional ratings
Review scores
Source	Rating
AllMusic	4/5 stars
Rolling Stone	2/5 stars
Smash Hits	7/10
Sounds	4/5 stars

The Firm is the debut studio album by British rock band the Firm, released by Atlantic Records on 22 February 1985. Its tracks range from the epic "Midnight Moonlight", based on a previously unreleased song by Led Zeppelin called "Swan Song" – first tinkered with during the Physical Graffiti sessions – to the commercially successful "Radioactive". "Closer" employs a horn section to subtle effect. The album also includes a version of the Righteous Brothers' hit "You've Lost That Lovin' Feelin'".

The Firm peaked at No. 17 on the Billboard 200 chart, and reached No. 15 on the UK Albums Chart. The song "Radioactive" topped Billboard's Top Rock Tracks chart for one week.

== Track listing ==
All tracks written by Jimmy Page and Paul Rodgers, except where indicated.

Side one
No.	Title	Writer(s)	Length
1.	"Closer"		2:52
2.	"Make or Break"	Rodgers	4:21
3.	"Someone to Love"		4:55
4.	"Together"		3:54
5.	"Radioactive"	Rodgers	2:49

Side two
No.	Title	Writer(s)	Length
1.	"You've Lost That Lovin' Feelin'" (The Righteous Brothers cover)	Phil Spector, Barry Mann, Cynthia Weil	4:33
2.	"Money Can't Buy"	Rodgers	3:35
3.	"Satisfaction Guaranteed"		4:07
4.	"Midnight Moonlight"		9:13

== Personnel ==
=== The Firm ===
- Paul Rodgers – lead vocals, acoustic and electric guitars, production
- Jimmy Page – acoustic and electric guitars, production
- Tony Franklin – fretless bass, keyboards, synthesizer, backing vocals
- Chris Slade – drums and percussion

=== Additional musicians ===
- Steve Dawson – trumpet on "Closer"
- Paul "Shilts" Weimar – baritone saxophone on "Closer"
- Willie Garnett – tenor saxophone on "Closer"
- Don Weller – tenor saxophone solo on "Closer"
- Sam Brown, Helen Chappelle & Joy Yates – backing vocals on "You've Lost That Lovin' Feeling" & "Midnight Moonlight"

=== Production personnel ===
- Stuart Epps – engineering
- Gordon Vicary – mastering
- Steve Maher – cover artwork
- Steve Privett – tape operation; supplier of tea, gin and tonics

== Accolades ==
Publication	Country	Accolade	Year	Rank
Kerrang!	UK	Albums of 1985	1985	20

== Charts ==
Chart (1985)	Peak position
Canada Top Albums/CDs (RPM)	16
New Zealand Albums (RMNZ)	47
Swedish Albums (Sverigetopplistan)	21
UK Albums (Official Charts)	15
US Billboard 200	17

== Certifications ==
Region	Certification	Certified units/sales
Canada (Music Canada)	Gold	50,000^{^}
United States (RIAA)	Gold	500,000^{^}
^{^} Shipments figures based on certification alone.
