= My Love of This Land =

1988 single by Killing Joke

Single by Killing Joke

from the album Outside the Gate
- A-side: "My Love of this Land"
- B-side: "Darkness Before Dawn"
- Released: 4 July 1988
- Genre: Synth-pop, new wave
- Length: 9:32
- Label: E.G. Records
- Songwriter(s): Jaz Coleman; Kevin "Geordie" Walker
- Producer(s): Jaz Coleman; Kevin "Geordie" Walker

Killing Joke singles chronology
| "America" (1988) | "My Love of This Land" (1988) | "The Beautiful Dead" (1990) |

10" single release
- My Love of This Land Side A Inner Sleeve

"My Love of This Land" is Killing Joke's second single from their seventh studio album, Outside the Gate. It was released by E.G. Records on 4 July 1988.

"My Love of this Land" reached No. 89 on the UK Singles Chart.

== Releases ==
"My Love of This Land" was first released as a 7" single, backed by B-side "Darkness Before Dawn" (previously from the album Night Time). "My Love of This Land" was then released as a 10" single in the UK, featuring a remix of the song by Glenn Skinner on the A-side, along with "Darkness Before Dawn", and "Follow the Leaders-Dub" and "Sun Goes Down" on the B-side. A third release of the single as a 12" featured the same A-side as the 10" release, while the B-side included a live version of "Pssyche" with "Follow the Leaders-Dub".

== Track listings ==
=== 7" single ===
Side A

1. "My Love of This Land" – 04:14

Side B

1. "Darkness Before Dawn" – 05:18

=== 10" single ===
Side A

1. "My Love of This Land" – 03:58 (Note: Mixed by Glenn Skinner)
2. "Darkness Before Dawn" – 05:18

Side B

1. "Follow the Leaders-Dub" – 04:00
2. "Sun Goes Down" – 04:19

=== 12" single ===
Side A

1. "My Love of This Land" – 03:58
2. "Darkness Before Dawn" – 05:18

Side B

1. "Follow the Leaders-Dub" – 04:00
2. "Pssyche (Live)" – 04:38

== Charts ==
| Year | Chart | Peak Position |
|---|---|---|
| 1988 | UK Singles Chart | 89 |
