= Cut Loose =

Studio album by Paul Rodgers
- Released: October 1983
- Recorded: at Sundown, Kingstone
- Genre: Rock
- Length: 40:53
- Label: Atlantic
- Producer: Paul Rodgers

Paul Rodgers chronology
Cut Loose (1983)	Muddy Water Blues: A Tribute to Muddy Waters (1993)

Singles from Cut Loose
- 1. "Cut Loose" Released: 1983; 2. "Morning After the Night Before" Released: 1983

Professional ratings
Review scores
Source	Rating
AllMusic	3/5 stars
Rolling Stone	2/5 stars

Cut Loose is the 1983 debut solo album by Paul Rodgers, of Free and Bad Company fame. Unlike his other work, Rodgers plays all the instruments on this album. It was recorded at his house in Kingstone.

The song "Live in Peace" was later re-recorded by Rodgers with his band The Firm for their second album Mean Business. "Superstar Woman" was originally recorded by Bad Company for their debut self-titled album, but it was ultimately left off the final track listing; Rodgers re-recorded it for this album. (The original Bad Company version was eventually released on The 'Original' Bad Co. Anthology in 1999.) The album peaked at #135 on the Billboard's 200 chart.

== Track listing ==
All tracks are written by Paul Rodgers.

No.	Title	Length
1.	"Fragile"	4:45
2.	"Cut Loose"	3:37
3.	"Live in Peace"	5:01
4.	"Sweet Sensation"	3:18
5.	"Rising Sun"	4:08
6.	"Boogie Mama"	3:11
7.	"Morning After the Night Before"	4:15
8.	"Northwinds"	3:58
9.	"Superstar Woman"	5:00
10.	"Talking Guitar Blues"	4:05

== Personnel ==
- Paul Rodgers - bass, guitar, drums, keyboards, vocals, producer, liner notes

Technical

- John Herdt - artwork, design
- Julian Mendelsohn - engineer
- Joe Reagoso - liner notes, reissue producer, remastering
