= Now & Live =

Studio album (with live tracks) by Paul Rodgers
- Released: June 1997
- Recorded: 1997 (CD1), 1995 (CD2)
- Label: Velvel (USA)
- Producer: Dan Priest, Eddie Kramer, Paul Rodgers, Stephen Croxford

Paul Rodgers chronology
Now (1997)	Now & Live (1997)	Electric (2000)

Now & Live is a double CD compilation-like album released in 1997 by Paul Rodgers of Free and Bad Company fame. In fact, it is a re-release of the studio album Now including a disc of live material recorded in 1995 and issued on the album Live: The Loreley Tapes. The album's full 24-track version, but as one CD (2003, SPV, Germany) also is known.

== Track listing ==
=== Disc one – Now ===
1. "Soul of Love" – 4:51
2. "Overloaded" – 3:16
3. "Heart of Fire" – 4:13
4. "Saving Grace " (Rodgers, Neal Schon, Geoff Whitehorn) – 4:51
5. "All I Want Is You" – 5:33
6. "Chasing Shadows" – 4:43
7. "Love Is All I Need" – 5:57
8. "Nights Like This" – 5:19
9. "Shadow of the Sun" – 5:23
10. "I Lost It All" – 5:53
11. "Holding Back the Storm" (Rodgers, Andrea Rodriguez)– 4:54

=== Disc two – Live ===
1. "Little Bit of Love" (Andy Fraser, Rodgers, Simon Kirke, Paul Kossoff) – 4:28
2. "Be My Friend" (Fraser, Rodgers) – 6:12
3. "Feel Like Makin' Love" (Rodgers, Mick Ralphs) – 4:31
4. "Louisiana Blues" (Muddy Waters) – 4:19
5. "Muddy Water Blues" (Rodgers) – 4:58
6. "Rollin' Stone" (Waters) – 10:13
7. "I'm Ready" (Willie Dixon) – 3:33
8. "Wishing Well" (Rodgers, Kirke, Tetsu Yamauchi, Kossoff, John Bundrick) – 4:28
9. "Mr. Big" (Fraser, Rodgers, Kirke, Kossoff) – 5:28
10. "Fire and Water" (Fraser, Rodgers) – 4:24
11. "The Hunter" (Booker T. Jones, Carl Wells, Al Jackson Jr., Donald Dunn, Steve Cropper) – 6:36
12. "Can't Get Enough" (Ralphs) – 4:07
13. "All Right Now" (Fraser, Rodgers) – 7:26

== Personnel ==
- Paul Rodgers - vocals, 12-string guitar, rhythm guitar, piano on "Love Is All I Need"
- Geoff Whitehorn - lead guitar, backing vocals
- Jaz Lochrie - bass, backing vocals
- Jim Copley - drums

with:

- Clive Brown and the Shekinah Singers - choir on "Love Is All I Need"
- Jennifer Phillips, Paul Boldeau - vocals on "Love Is All I Need"
- Dan Priest - tambourine on "All I Want Is You"
