= All the King's Horses (The Firm song) =

Song performed by The Firm

Single by The Firm

from the album Mean Business
- Released: 1986
- Genre: Rock
- Length: 3:16
- Label: Atlantic Records
- Songwriter(s): Paul Rodgers
- Producer(s): Paul Rodgers, Jimmy Page

The Firm singles chronology
"Satisfaction Guaranteed" (1985)	"All the King's Horses" (1986)	"Live in Peace" (1986)

"All the King's Horses" is a song by The Firm from the album Mean Business, released as a single in 1986.

In the United States, the single spent four weeks at No. 1 on the Billboard Album Rock Tracks chart, reached No. 61 on the Billboard Hot 100 and No. 67 on the Cash Box Top 100 Singles chart. When it was released on an EP, the other side had the song, "Fortune Hunter". It was released in the US three times, in the UK once, and in Spain once.

== Charts ==
Chart (1986)	Peak position
US Billboard Hot 100	61
US Mainstream Rock (Billboard)	1
US Cash Box Top 100 Singles	67
