= Paul Rodgers =

English-Canadian singer (born 1949)

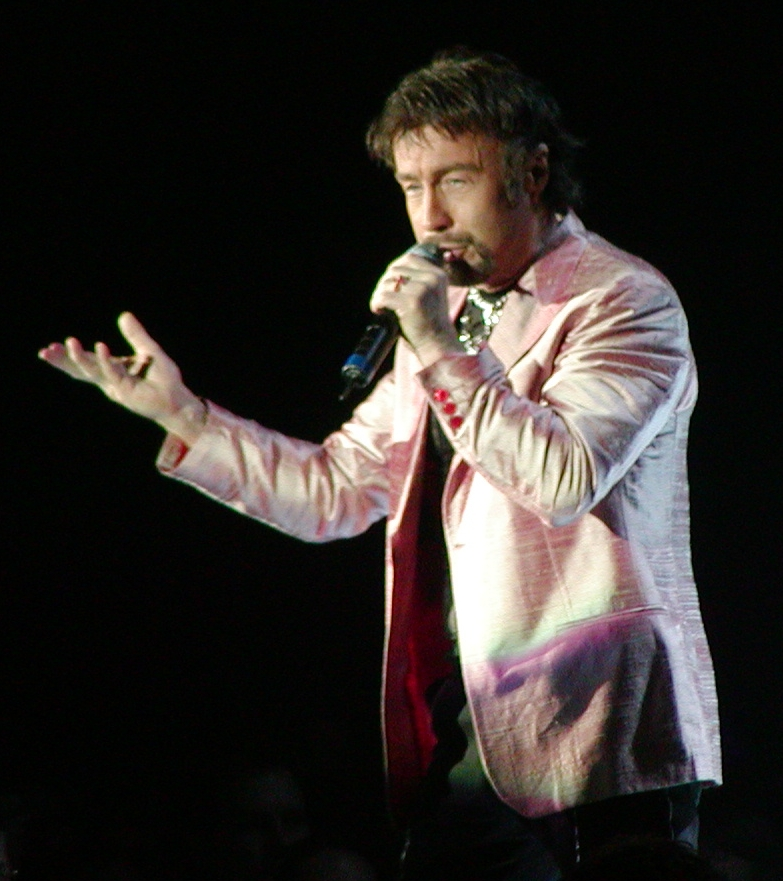
- Rodgers performing with Queen at Festhalle Frankfurt in Frankfurt, Germany, on 19 April 2005

Background information
- Born: Paul Bernard Rodgers; 17 December 1949 (age 76); Middlesbrough, England
- Genres: Rock; blues rock; hard rock; blues; soul blues
- Occupations: Singer; songwriter
- Instruments: Vocals; guitar; bass; piano; drums
- Years active: 1968–present
- Labels: Atlantic; Victor Entertainment; SPV GmbH; Velvel; Sun Records
- Formerly of: Brown Sugar; Free; Bad Company; The Firm; The Law; Queen + Paul Rodgers
- Spouses: Machiko Shimizu (m. 1971; div. 1996) Cynthia Kereluk (m. 2007)
- Website: paulrodgers.com

Paul Bernard Rodgers (born 17 December 1949) is an English singer. He was the lead vocalist of numerous successful rock bands, including Free, Bad Company, the Firm and the Law. He also has performed as a solo artist and collaborated with the remaining active members of Queen under the name Queen + Paul Rodgers, from 2004 to 2009. A poll in Rolling Stone magazine ranked him number 55 on its list of the "100 Greatest Singers of All Time". In 2011, Rodgers received the British Academy's Ivor Novello Award for Outstanding Contribution to British Music.

Rodgers has been cited as a significant influence on various rock singers. In 1991, John Mellencamp called Rodgers "the best rock singer ever". Freddie Mercury in particular liked Rodgers and his aggressive style. Rodgers holds joint citizenship, after becoming a Canadian citizen in 2011.

In 2025, Rodgers was inducted into Rock and Roll Hall of Fame as a member of Bad Company.

== Early life and career ==
Rodgers was born in Middlesbrough, England. He played bass for a band named The Roadrunners. Colin Bradley originally had the lead vocal slot, but convinced Rodgers to sing and front the band as Colin was primarily interested in playing rhythm guitar and his oldest brother Joe (who managed the band) supported the idea. Just before leaving Middlesbrough for the London music scene, the band changed its name to the Wildflowers. Other members of the band were Micky Moody (later of Whitesnake) and Bruce Thomas (later of Elvis Costello and The Attractions).

== Career ==
=== Free ===
In 1968, Rodgers joined bluesy rockers Free as singer and songwriter. In 1970, they shot up the international radio charts with "All Right Now", which Rodgers wrote with the group's bassist Andy Fraser. It was a number one hit in more than 20 territories and acknowledged by ASCAP in 1990 for having received over a million radio plays in the US.

For a short time, Free were alongside Led Zeppelin as among the highest grossing British acts, though Free's status was not sustained. Free released four albums with a combination of blues, ballads and rock which were Top Five successes in the UK. When in 2000, the song "All Right Now" achieved the mark of two million radio plays in the UK, an award was given to Rodgers as one of the two writers.

After the first break-up of Free in the spring of 1971, Rodgers briefly formed a three-piece band called Peace. Alongside bassist Stewart McDonald and drummer Mick Underwood, Rodgers played guitar and sang lead vocals. Peace supported Mott the Hoople's UK tour in 1971, but broke up when Free reformed at the start of 1972. The Peace song "Lady" was later included on the Free compilation The Free Story in 1973, while two more tracks were eventually released on the fifth disc of the 2000 Free box set Songs of Yesterday, along with a song that Rodgers recorded with the Maytals. A bootleg has circulated of a 22 December 1971 appearance by Peace, live in studio, on BBC Radio 1's Top Gear program.

=== 1970s: Bad Company ===
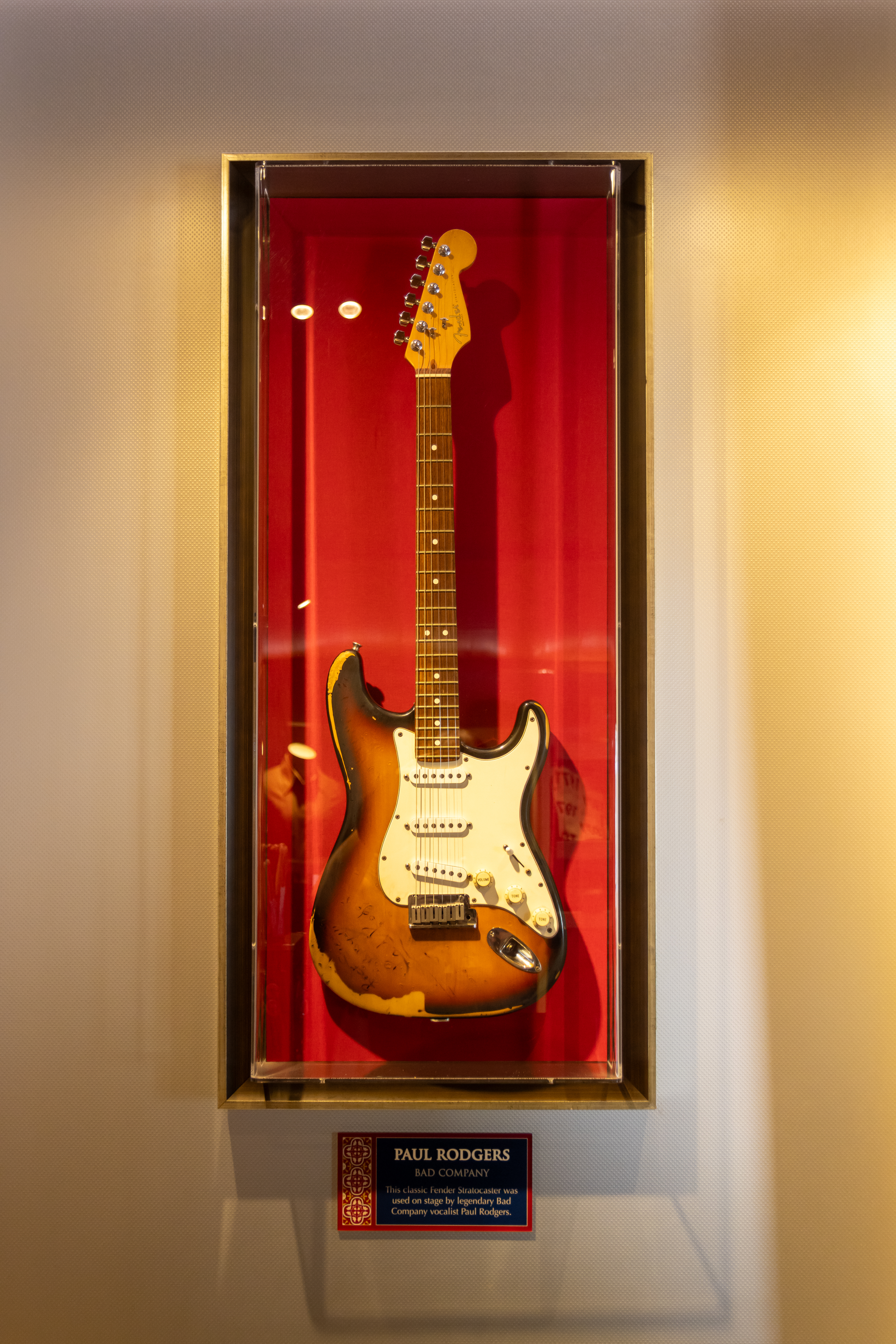
Guitar used by Rodgers, on display at the Hard Rock Cafe in Tenerife, Canary Islands

Rodgers formed his next band, Bad Company, with Mick Ralphs, former guitarist of Mott the Hoople. The line-up also included Free drummer Simon Kirke, and Boz Burrell, former vocalist and bassist of King Crimson. Rodgers said that he and Ralphs were still trying to come up with a name for the band. Rodgers had just written the song Bad Company and mentioned the new song he had written, "and I just said 'Bad Company', and there was this scuffling noise and he said, 'Sh_, I dropped the phone—that's it!'"

Bad Company was the first act signed to Led Zeppelin's new record label, Swan Song. They toured from 1973 to 1982, and had several hits including "Feel Like Makin' Love", "Can't Get Enough", "Shooting Star", "Bad Company", and "Run with the Pack". Rodgers played instruments on several tracks: "Bad Company" and "Run with the Pack" featured him on piano; "Rock and Roll Fantasy" on guitar; and on the ballad "Seagull" Rodgers played all of the instruments. Bad Company earned six platinum albums until Rodgers left in 1982, stating that he wanted to spend time with his young family.

It was revealed in April 2011 that after Jim Morrison's death in 1971, the rest of The Doors wanted Rodgers to replace him. Robby Krieger flew to England to personally offer him the job. However, Rodgers has said that he was off the grid in a very rural area at the time, and the moment passed. In late 1973, Rodgers was asked to become the singer of Deep Purple when Ian Gillan had left the band. He rejected their offer in order to start Bad Company.

=== 1980s: Solo career and the Firm ===
In October 1983, Rodgers released his first solo LP Cut Loose. He composed all of the music and played all of the instruments. The album reached number 135 on Billboard's Pop Albums chart.

When his friend Jimmy Page started to come around to his house, guitar in hand and Led Zeppelin at an end, the duo's first live pairing was on the US ARMS (Action Research into Multiple Sclerosis) Tour, which had first been mooted by Eric Clapton and besides Rodgers and Page included Jeff Beck, Joe Cocker, Steve Winwood and others. The inspiration behind ARMS had been former Small Faces/Faces member Ronnie Lane's own struggle with MS. That led to Rodgers and Page's further teaming in the group The Firm, which resulted in two albums and two tours. Critics' reception of the band was sometimes scathing (one review used the term "supersludge") and also mixed. Even so, the Firm's two albums, The Firm and Mean Business, achieved moderate sales success and produced the radio hits "Radioactive", "Satisfaction Guaranteed", and, in the UK, "All The King's Horses".

During that same period, a series of albums were produced called Willie and the Poor Boys. Rodgers and Page were briefly part of this and recorded "These Arms of Mine", an Otis Redding tune. The recording also became a video promoting the CD.

=== 1990s: The Law and solo career ===
The Law, Rodgers' 1991 musical venture with former the Who and Faces drummer Kenney Jones, produced Billboard's number one AOR chart hit "Laying Down the Law" written by Rodgers, but the album peaked at number 126 on the Billboard 200 chart. A second album can be found on the bootleg market, which is often referred to as The Law II. It is believed that this collection of songs were leftovers from the first album. Rodgers acknowledged the influence of Jimi Hendrix by collaborating with Steve Vai, Hendrix's Band of Gypsys (Buddy Miles and Billy Cox) and the London Metropolitan Orchestra and recording the track "Bold As Love", on the Hendrix tribute album In From The Storm. Then Rodgers teamed with Journey guitarist Neal Schon and drummer Deen Castronovo for his release The Hendrix Set, a live 5-track CD, recorded in 1993 with Rodgers' interpretations of Hendrix songs. A Canadian and US tour followed. His Grammy-nominated solo CD, Muddy Water Blues: A Tribute to Muddy Waters was released in 1993. Rodgers wrote the title track and was backed by guitarists Brian May, Gary Moore, David Gilmour, Jeff Beck, Steve Miller, Buddy Guy, Richie Sambora, Brian Setzer, Slash, Neal Schon, and Trevor Rabin.

For Woodstock's 25th anniversary in 1994, Rodgers pulled together drummer Jason Bonham, bassist Andy Fraser (from Free), guitarists Slash and Schon at the last moment to perform as the Paul Rodgers Rock and Blues Revue. In 1995, he formed a new band consisting of Jaz Lochrie on bass, Jimmy Copley on drums and Geoff Whitehorn on guitar. The band (The Paul Rodgers Band) toured extensively in Europe, US and in the UK until 1998 and released three albums – Live: The Loreley Tapes, Now and Electric. Now charted internationally in the Top 40. The single "Soul of Love" remained in rotation on more than 86 US radio stations for six months but was not a sales success. His 1997 world tour included Russia, Japan, Canada, US, UK, Germany, France, Romania, Bulgaria, Israel, Brazil, Greece and Argentina.

Rodgers and Bad Company were on Billboard's US BDS charts with the number one single "Hey, Hey" in 1999, one of four new tracks off Bad Company's The 'Original' Bad Co. Anthology. The second single release, Rodgers's "Hammer of Love", reached number two. For the first time in 20 years, all the original members of Bad Company toured the US.

=== 2000s: Solo career, Queen and Bad Company reunion ===
Rodgers focused on his solo career in 2000 and released Electric, his sixth solo CD. In its debut week, the single "Drifters" was US rock radio's number one on the Most Added FMQB Hot Trax list, number two on Most Added R&R Rock and number three on Most Added Album Net Power Cuts. "Drifters" remained in the top 10 for eight weeks on Billboard's Rock charts. Also in 2000, he played sold-out concerts in England, Scotland, Australia, the United States, and Canada. After his appearance on TV's Late Show with David Letterman in New York, he met and jammed with B. B. King. In the same year, Rodgers, Jimmie Vaughan, Levon Helm, bluesmen Hubert Sumlin, Johnnie Johnson, James Cotton and others performed a sold out concert in Cleveland, Ohio as a Muddy Water Blues: A Tribute to Muddy Waters. In spring 2001, Rodgers returned to Australia, England and Scotland for the second run of sold-out shows. That summer he toured the US with Bad Company.

Rodgers and Bad Company released their first official live CD and DVD, In Concert: Merchants of Cool, in 2002. It included all the hits and a new single, "Joe Fabulous", penned by Rodgers, which hit number one at Classic Rock Radio and Top 20 on mainstream rock radio in the US. In its debut week, the DVD sales sound scanned at number three Canada, and number four in the US. The Joe Fabulous Tour kicked off in the US and sold out in the UK. While in London, Rodgers performed with Jeff Beck at the Royal Festival Hall. Rodgers was invited by long-time fan Tony Blair to perform at the Labour Party Conference. "I had the entire Labour Party singing the chorus of "Wishing Well", a song I wrote and shared with Free, ...'love in a peaceful world'. 'Love in a peaceful world'... over and over and over hoping the words would sink in but we went to war" recalled Rodgers. Twice in 2002, Rodgers performed on Britain's TV show Top of the Pops 2.

In 2003, Rodgers toured as a solo artist for the first time in two years playing 25 US dates. In his solo band were guitarist Howard Leese (formerly of Heart), bassist Lynn Sorensen, and drummer Jeff Kathan. Jools Holland invited Rodgers to record "I Told The Truth" for Holland's album Small World Big Band. The CD also featured Eric Clapton, Ronnie Wood, Peter Gabriel, Michael McDonald, Ringo Starr and others. That led to Rodgers performing two sold-out nights at London's Royal Albert Hall with Holland and his 18-piece rhythm and blues orchestra, and several UK TV appearances. He also appeared with Jeff Beck, performing some songs from Beck's back catalogue (along with several other notable musicians including John McLaughlin, Roger Waters, and The White Stripes ) for part of a week-long series of charity concerts put on by Jeff Beck at the Royal Festival Hall in London.

Early in 2004, Rodgers joined Mitch Mitchell and Billy Cox (Hendrix's Cry of Love), Buddy Guy, Joe Satriani, Kid Rock's Kenny Olson, Alice in Chains' Jerry Cantrell, Double Trouble, Indigenous, Kenny Wayne Shepherd, and blues legend Hubert Sumlin (Howlin' Wolf and Muddy Waters) and performed three sold-out shows in Seattle, Portland and San Francisco as "Experience Hendrix". Once again, Rodgers only played 25 concerts in the US and Canada. He performed at Wembley for the fiftieth anniversary celebration for the Fender Stratocaster, along with David Gilmour who played Strat No. 001, Ronnie Wood, Brian May, Joe Walsh and Gary Moore. Rodgers sang and played a custom designed Jaguar Fender Strat. He was invited by the Four Tops to be part of their fiftieth anniversary TV/DVD concert celebration at Motown's Opera House and performed alongside Aretha Franklin, Dennis Edwards & The Temptations Revue, Sam Moore, Mary Wilson, Ashford & Simpson, and the Four Tops.

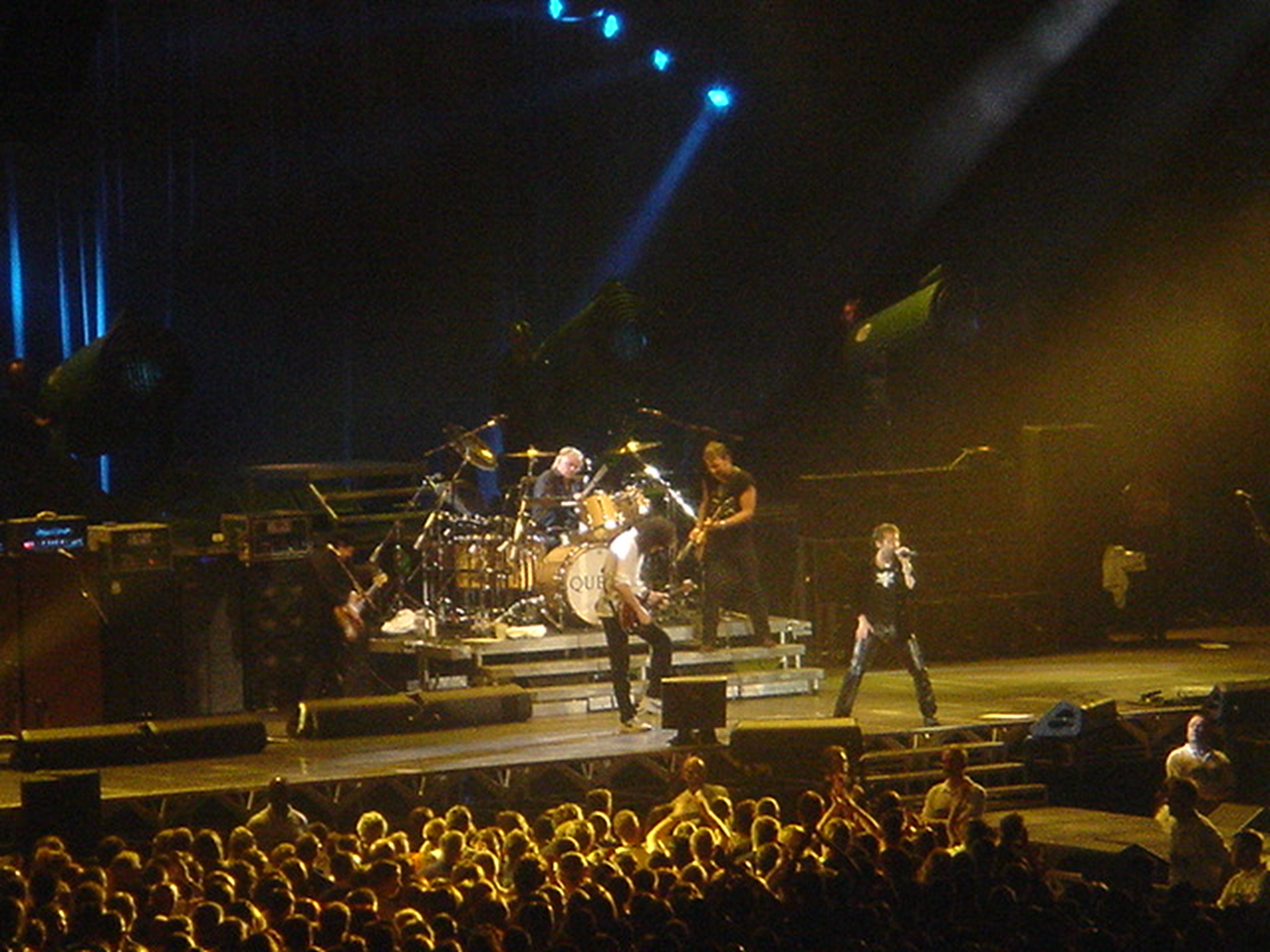
Paul Rodgers and Queen at the NEC in Birmingham, England, May 2005

In late 2004, after a successful live television performance, two of the three living members of the British rock group Queen proposed a collaboration with Rodgers, in which he would sing lead vocals on a European tour. Rodgers thus joined Brian May and Roger Taylor (former bassist John Deacon retired in the late 1990s), with the group billed as Queen + Paul Rodgers and they subsequently toured worldwide in 2005 and 2006. The participants clearly said, including on Brian May's own website, "that Rodgers would be "featured with" Queen as: "Queen + Paul Rodgers", not replacing the late Freddie Mercury". The group then released a live album with songs from Queen, Bad Company and Free, called Return of the Champions, and a DVD of the same name. Both featured live recordings from their Sheffield Hallam FM Arena concert on 9 May 2005. The DVD features "Imagine" from Hyde Park. "For one glorious summer" opined music critic Sean Michaels "we were all Paul Rodgers". Another DVD was released in 2006 from a live performance in Japan, called Super Live in Japan.

Queen + Paul Rodgers also released a single featuring "Reaching Out", "Tie Your Mother Down" and "Fat Bottomed Girls". In the summer of 2006, Rodgers again focused on his solo career with a world tour, which commenced in Austin, Texas in June, went to Japan, and ending in Glasgow, Scotland, in October 2006. On 15 August 2006, Brian May confirmed through his website that "Queen + Paul Rodgers" would begin producing a new studio album beginning in October, to be recorded at Roger Taylor's home. In April 2007 Rodgers released a live album of his 2006 tour, Live in Glasgow, recorded in Glasgow on 13 October 2006, with a DVD of the same show released the next month. On 27–28 December 2007, Rodgers performed with the Trans-Siberian Orchestra during their Winter 2007 Tour in Houston and Dallas. Unannounced, he joined the band at the end of their show to sing "Bad Company" and "All Right Now". Rogers was a judge for the sixth and seventh annual Independent Music Awards to support independent artists.

On 27 June 2008, Rodgers and Queen performed at the Concert for Nelson Mandela to celebrate Mandela's 90th birthday. On 8 August 2008, Rodgers and original members Mick Ralphs and Simon Kirke reunited as Bad Company to perform a one-night only, sold-out performance at the Seminole Hard Rock Live in Hollywood, Florida. The live performance was released on Blu-ray, DVD, and CD on 9 February 2010 and the tracks included seventeen Bad Company hits. Rodgers dedicated "Gone, Gone, Gone" to original bassist Boz Burrell, who died in 2006.

On 14 May 2009, Rodgers announced that he was ending his five-year-long collaboration with Queen, although he did not rule out the possibility of working with them again. On 17 November 2009, it was announced he would join the other surviving members of Bad Company for an eight-date UK tour in April 2010.

=== 2010s: Solo career and more Bad Company ===
From 5 June 2010 to 18 June 2010 Rodgers and his band were on a small tour of California. They performed at the Temecula Valley Balloon & Wine Festival. One week later, on 12 June, Rodgers and his band went to appeared as headliners on the Grandstand Stage at the San Diego County Fair in Del Mar, California, followed by casino shows in Lemoore on 17 June and in Santa Ynez on 18 June. Rodgers performed a solo UK tour in April 2011 with Joe Elliot's Down 'n' Outz. The concert of 28 April at Birmingham's National Indoor Arena was filmed for a future live DVD release. In May 2011 Rodgers received an Ivor Novello Award for "Outstanding contribution to British music"

Rodgers announced that he would be taking part in a Paul McCartney tribute album which has contributions by Billy Joel, Garth Brooks, B. B. King, and Kiss. Originally planned for a late 2010 release, the album, entitled The Art of McCartney, was released in late 2014. Rodgers' contribution is a cover of the Wings song "Let Me Roll It", originally from their 1973 album Band on the Run. In 2014, he toured again with Bad Company. He performed again with the Trans-Siberian Orchestra on their New Year's Eve show in Seattle. He performed Can't Get Enough and All Right Now.

In 2017 Rodgers embarked on a 'Free Spirit' UK Tour in May 2017 to celebrate the music of Free by performing songs strictly from the Free catalogue. He said "It was 50 years ago in 1967 when Paul Kossoff and I met and later formed Free". In 2018 a CD/DVD set was released which recorded the final show from the 'Free Spirit' tour; it was filmed at the Royal Albert Hall on 28 May 2017. In the summer of 2018 Rodgers toured with Jeff Beck. In 2023, he released the album Midnight Rose, his first solo album of original material in 24 years. He said in an interview with Eddie Trunk that he had no plans to tour in support of it.

== Personal life ==
=== Relationships and family ===
Rodgers has a daughter, Natalie, from an early relationship, who lives in his hometown of Middlesbrough. Paul Rodgers married Machiko Shimizu in 1971 and they have two children, Steve and Jasmine. Both children are musicians, known for being members of the rock band Bôa. Paul Rodgers and Shimizu divorced in 1996.

In 2007, Rodgers married Cynthia Kereluk, a former Miss Canada, with whom he'd been in a relationship since 1997.

Rodgers became a Canadian citizen on 21 October 2011 and lives in British Columbia.

=== Health ===
In 2016 Rodgers suffered the first of two major strokes. The second in 2019, greatly affected his speech and musical abilities. Those strokes, along with 11 more minor strokes, required an endarterectomy. He has since made a full recovery.

== Discography ==
=== Solo ===
Studio albums

- Cut Loose (1983)
- Muddy Water Blues: A Tribute to Muddy Waters (1993)
- Now (1997)
- Electric (1999)
- The Royal Sessions (2014)
- Free Spirit (2018)
- Midnight Rose (2023)

Live albums

- The Hendrix Set (live EP, 1993)
- Paul Rodgers and Friends: Live at Montreux (1994, edited 2011)
- Live: The Loreley Tapes (live album, 1996)
- Now and Live (2CD compilation, 1997)
- Extended Versions (live album, 2006) (10 of the 13 Loreley Tapes in different order)
- Live in Glasgow (2007)
- Live at Hammersmith Apollo 2009 (2010)

=== with Free ===
Studio Albums

- Tons of Sobs (1969)
- Free (1969)
- Fire and Water (1970)
- Highway (1970)
- Free at Last (1972)
- Heartbreaker (1973)

Live Albums

- Free Live! (live album, 1971)

=== with Bad Company ===
Studio Albums

- Bad Company (1974)
- Straight Shooter (1975)
- Run With the Pack (1976)
- Burnin' Sky (1977)
- Desolation Angels (1979)
- Rough Diamonds (1982)

Live Albums

- In Concert: Merchants of Cool (2002)
- Hard Rock Live (2010)
- Live at Wembley (2011)
- Live in Concert 1977 & 1979 (2016)
- Live at Red Rocks (2017)

=== with The Firm ===
Studio Albums

- The Firm (1985)
- Mean Business (1986)

Live Albums

- The Firm Live at Hammersmith 1984 (DVD, 1984, limited release video)
- Five From the Firm (DVD, 1986)

=== with The Law ===
- The Law (1991)

=== with Queen ===
Studio Albums

- The Cosmos Rocks (CD, 2008)

Live Albums

- Return of the Champions (CD/LP/DVD, 2005)
- Super Live in Japan (DVD, 2006; Japan only)
- Live in Ukraine (CD/DVD, 2009)
