= The Hendrix Set =

EP by Paul Rodgers
- Released: 1993
- Recorded: July 4, 1993
- Venue: Bayfront Park in Miami, Florida
- Genre: Rock
- Length: 22:06
- Label: Victory Music, Inc.
- Producer: Paul Rodgers and Neal Schon

Paul Rodgers chronology
| Muddy Water Blues: A Tribute to Muddy Waters (1993) | The Hendrix Set (1993) | Live: The Loreley Tapes (1996) |

Professional ratings
Review scores
| Source | Rating |
|---|---|
| Allmusic | 2.5/5 stars |

The Hendrix Set is a live EP by two time Grammy nominee Paul Rodgers of Free and Bad Company fame. Released 2 November 1993, The Hendrix Set consists of covers of five of Jimi Hendrix's songs. It was recorded live at Bayfront Park in Miami, Florida on 4 July 1993. The EP features Neal Schon of Journey on guitar, as well as future Journey members Deen Castronovo and Todd Jensen.

== Track listing ==
All tracks are written by Jimi Hendrix.

| No. | Title | Length |
|---|---|---|
| 1. | "Purple Haze" | 5:03 |
| 2. | "Stone Free" (includes excerpt of "I Feel Free", originally by Cream) | 6:16 |
| 3. | "Little Wing" (includes excerpt of "Angel") | 5:01 |
| 4. | "Manic Depression" | 3:38 |
| 5. | "Foxy Lady" | 4:28 |

== Personnel ==
=== Paul Rodgers and Company ===
- Paul Rodgers – vocals
- Neal Schon – guitar
- Todd Jensen – bass
- Deen Castronovo – drums

=== Technical ===
- Paul Rodgers, Neal Schon – producers
- Steve Croxford – production manager
- Craig Schertz, Lee Baird – engineers
- Stephen Marcussen – mastering
- Harry Zontal – mixing engineer
- Karl Kristkeitz – art direction
- Mike Guzzeta – photography
- Rob Belcher – band technician
