= Sanity (song) =

1986 Killing Joke song

Single by Killing Joke

from the album Brighter Than a Thousand Suns
- A-side: "Sanity"
- B-side: "Goodbye to the Village"
- Released: October 1986
- Genre: Synthpop, post-punk, new wave
- Length: 10:12
- Label: E.G. Records; Virgin; Virgin Music (Canada); Virgin France S.A. Virgin Schallplatten GmbH
- Songwriters: Jaz Coleman; Kevin "Geordie" Walker; Paul Raven; Paul Ferguson
- Producer: Chris Kimsey

Killing Joke singles chronology
"Adorations" (1986)	"Sanity" (1986)	"America" (1988)

Killing Joke cassette singles chronology
""Adorations (The Cassette Maxi Single)"" (1986)	""Sanity (The Cassette Maxi Single)"" (1986)	""Millennium (The Cassette Maxi Single)"" (1994)

"Sanity" is Killing Joke's second single from their sixth studio album, Brighter Than a Thousand Suns. It was released in October 1986. The single peaked at No. 70 in the UK Singles chart. All of the releases were mixed by Julian Mendelsohn and Zeus B. Held, and produced by Chris Kimsey.

== Track listings ==
As with previous single "Adorations", "Sanity" was released in several versions including remixes. The 7" single was the original album version, backed by "Goodbye to the Village".

The song had two 12" vinyl remixes, "Sanity (The Insane Mix)" and "Sanity (The Roman Mix)". A cassette maxi single featured an instrumental mix of "Sanity", plus "Goodbye to the Village" and "Wardance (Naval Mix)".

In 1987, "Sanity" was re-released in America by Virgin Records as a 12" single featuring "Sanity (The Roman Mix)" as the A-side and both "Sanity (Edited Version)" and "Eighties" as B-sides. A 12" promo single of an acappella mix of "Sanity" was also released.

=== 7" single ===
All tracks mixed by Julian Mendelsohn and produced by Chris Kimsey.

Side A

1. "Sanity" – 04:42

Side B

1. "Goodbye to the Village" – 05:30

=== 12" Insane Mix ===
"Sanity" and "Wardance" were mixed by Zeus B. Held. "Goodbye to the Village" was mixed by Julian Mendelsohn. "Sanity" and "Goodbye to the Village" were produced by Chris Kimsey.

Side A

1. "Sanity (The Insane Mix)" – 06:15

Side B

1. "Goodbye to the Village" – 05:30
2. "Wardance (The RAF Mix)" – 03:41

=== 12" Roman Mix ===
Both versions of "Sanity" were mixed by Zeus B. Held. "Goodbye to the Village" was mixed by Julian Mendelsohn.

Side A

1. "Sanity (The Roman Mix)" – 05:09

Side B

1. "Goodbye to the Village" – 05:30
2. "Sanity (Instrumental Mix)" – 05:01

=== 12" Virgin Records America release ===
"Sanity (The Roman Mix)" was mixed by Zeus B. Held. "Sanity (Edited Version)" was mixed by Julian Mendelsohn.

Side A

1. "Sanity (The Roman Mix)" – 05:07

Side B

1. "Sanity (Edited Version)" – 04:33
2. "Eighties" – 03:50

=== Cassette maxi single ===
"Sanity" and "Wardance" were mixed by Zeus B. Held. "Goodbye to the Village" was produced by Chris Kimsey and mixed by Julian Mendelsohn.

Side one/two

1. "Sanity (Instrumental Mix)" – 05:00
2. "Goodbye to the Village" – 05:30
3. "Wardance (The Naval Mix)" – 03:41

=== 12" Virgin Records America promo ===
All tracks mixed by Julian Mendelsohn.

Side A

1. "Sanity (Vocal/LP Version)" – 04:44

Side B

1. "Sanity (Vocal/LP Version)" – 04:44

== Charts ==
Year	Chart	Peak Position
1986	UK Singles Chart	70
