= Live in Glasgow (Paul Rodgers album) =

Live album by Paul Rodgers
- Released: April 16, 2007
- Recorded: October 13, 2006, Glasgow, Scotland
- Genres: Hard rock, blues-rock
- Length: 70:14
- Label: Eagle Records

Paul Rodgers chronology
Electric (2000)	Live in Glasgow (2007)	The Royal Sessions (2014)

Professional ratings
Review scores
Source	Rating
Allmusic	3.5/5 stars

Live in Glasgow is a live album by Paul Rodgers of Free and Bad Company fame, recorded at the Clyde Auditorium on October 16, 2006.

The album features hits from Rodgers' previous bands, blues standards and one new song, "Warboys (A Prayer for Peace)", which was later re-recorded by Rodgers as part of Queen + Paul Rodgers for their studio album The Cosmos Rocks. The song "I Just Want to See You Smile" is a new arrangement of a track Rodgers recorded with The Maytals while Free were on hiatus between 1971 and 1972. The Maytals' version was not released at the time, but eventually appeared on the Free rarities box set Songs of Yesterday in 2000.

Rodgers' backing band for the concert included former Heart guitarist Howard Leese and bassist Lynn Sorensen, both of whom would subsequently join Rodgers on tour in a reformed Bad Company, appearing on the albums Hard Rock Live and Live at Wembley.

A DVD of the same name and concert was also released in May 2007.

== Tracks ==
No.	Title	Writer(s)	Length
1.	"I'll Be Creepin'"	Andy Fraser, Paul Rodgers	4:27
2.	"The Stealer"	Fraser, Rodgers, Paul Kossoff	3:32
3.	"Ride on a Pony"	Fraser, Rodgers	4:21
4.	"Radioactive"	Rodgers	3:44
5.	"Be My Friend"	Fraser, Rodgers	6:22
6.	"Warboys (A Prayer for Peace)"	Rodgers	3:46
7.	"Feel Like Makin' Love"	Rodgers, Mick Ralphs	4:52
8.	"Bad Company"	Rodgers, Simon Kirke	5:21
9.	"I Just Want to See You Smile"	Rodgers	3:36
10.	"Louisiana Blues"	Muddy Waters	3:28
11.	"Fire and Water"	Fraser, Rodgers	4:17
12.	"Wishing Well"	Rodgers, Kirke, Tetsu Yamauchi, Kossoff, John Bundrick	3:29
13.	"All Right Now"	Fraser, Rodgers	6:27
14.	"I'm a Mover"	Fraser, Rodgers	3:06
15.	"The Hunter"	Booker T. Jones, Carl Wells, Al Jackson Jr., Donald Dunn, Steve Cropper	4:25
16.	"Can't Get Enough"	Ralphs	4:35
17.	"Seagull"	Rodgers, Ralphs	3:46

== Personnel ==
- Paul Rodgers - lead vocals, guitar, piano
- Howard Leese - guitar, backing vocals
- Kurtis Dengler - guitar
- Lynn Sorensen - bass, backing vocals
- Ryan Hoyle - drums

== Trivia ==
- The album is dedicated to Joe Bradley (Rodgers' first manager), Boz Burrell, Ahmet Ertegün and Henk Huffener.
- The album packaging features quotes from Jimmy Page and Brian May.
- The corresponding DVD was Rodgers' first solo DVD release.
