= Electric (Paul Rodgers album) =

Studio album by Paul Rodgers
- Released: 2000
- Studio: Lartington Hall Studios, Barnard Castle, UK
- Genre: Rock
- Length: 41:38
- Label: CMC International (UK); JVC Victor (Japan); SPV (Germany)
- Producer: Paul Rodgers

Paul Rodgers chronology
Now and Live (1997)	Electric (2000)	Live in Glasgow (2007)

Singles from Electric
- 1. "Find a Way" Released: 1999

Electric is the fourth studio album by Paul Rodgers, of Free and Bad Company fame. It was recorded at Lartington Hall Studios near Barnard Castle in the North East of England and was released in 2000.

It is Rodgers' last solo album to feature Geoff Whitehorn, Jaz Lochrie and Jim Copley on guitar, bass and drums, respectively, although Lochrie would go on to play with Rodgers in a reformed Bad Company, appearing on the In Concert: Merchants of Cool live album.

Professional ratings
Review scores
Source	Rating
Allmusic	

== Track listing ==
All tracks are written by Paul Rodgers.

No.	Title	Length
1.	"Deep Blue"	2:33
2.	"Walking Tall"	3:34
3.	"Find a Way"	5:37
4.	"China Blue"	3:01
5.	"Love Rains"	3:18
6.	"Over You"	6:29
7.	"Drifters"	4:19
8.	"Freedom"	3:53
9.	"Jasmine Flower"	3:59
10.	"Conquistadora"	4:55

Japanese edition bonus track
No.	Title	Length
11.	"Other Side of Midnight"	3:19

== Personnel ==
- Paul Rodgers - guitar, piano, lead vocals, producer, mixing
- Geoff Whitehorn - guitar
- Jim Copley - drums
- Jaz Lochrie - bass guitar
- Tom Keenlyside - flute
- Saffron Henderson - backing vocals
- Tania Hancheroff - backing vocals
- Catherine St. Germain - backing vocals
- Cynthia Kereluk - backing vocals

Technical

- Zach Blackstone - assistant engineer
- Dean Maher - assistant engineer
- Stephen Croxford - coordination

== Charts ==
=== Singles ===
Year	Single	Chart	Position
2000	"Drifters"	Billboard Mainstream Rock Tracks	33
