= The Royal Sessions =

Studio album by Paul Rodgers
- Released: 4 February 2014
- Recorded: 2013, Royal Studios, Memphis
- Genres: Blues, soul
- Length: 41:34
- Labels: 429 Records, Pie Records
- Producer: Perry A. Margouleff

Paul Rodgers chronology
Live in Glasgow (2007)	The Royal Sessions (2014)	Midnight Rose (2023)

The Royal Sessions is a studio album by Paul Rodgers of Free and Bad Company fame. Released on 4 February 2014, it consists of ten covers of blues, rhythm & blues and soul songs recorded at Royal Studios in Memphis, Tennessee with local musicians and produced by Perry A. Margouleff. Rodgers chose songs for the album that inspired him in his youth.

Rodgers announced before the album's release that he would be donating all proceeds from it to the Stax Music Academy, an after-school music programme in Memphis, stating that he wanted to "pay the proceeds to the people who gave us this music".

The album entered the Billboard Blues Albums chart at number one, and debuted on the Billboard 200 at number 81.

== Reception ==
Professional ratings
Aggregate scores
Source	Rating
Metacritic	74/100
Review scores
Source	Rating
AllMusic	4/5 stars
Glide	8/10
USA Today	3/4 stars
Winnipeg Sun	2.5/5 stars

Steven Thomas Erlewine, reviewing the album for AllMusic, describes it as "enjoyable". Glide magazine awarded it 8/10. USA Today gave it three stars out of four, with Jerry Shriver saying that "Rodgers' devotion rings true". The Winnipeg Sun gave it two and a half stars, describing it as "Enjoyable, but not essential." Le Parisien writer Michel Valentin viewed the familiarity of the songs as a drawback.

== Track listing ==
No.	Title	Writer(s)	Length
1.	"I Thank You"	Isaac Hayes, David Porter	3:10
2.	"Down Don’t Bother Me"	Albert King	2:17
3.	"I Can’t Stand the Rain"	Don Bryant, Bernard Miller, Ann Peebles	4:05
4.	"I’ve Been Loving You Too Long (To Stop Now)"	Jerry Butler, Otis Redding	5:36
5.	"That's How Strong My Love Is"	Roosevelt Jamison	3:15
6.	"Walk On By"	Burt Bacharach, Hal David	6:49
7.	"Any Ole Way"	Steve Cropper, Otis Redding	2:38
8.	"It's Growing"	Warren Moore, Smokey Robinson	3:05
9.	"Born Under a Bad Sign"	William Bell, Booker T. Jones	4:09
10.	"I’ve Got Dreams to Remember"	Otis Redding	6:31

- The vinyl version of this album does not contain "Born Under a Bad Sign"
- Amazon Exclusive includes three bonus tracks – "Shake", "Walk In My Shadow" and "Wonderful World"

== Personnel ==
- Paul Rodgers – vocals
- Michael Toles – guitar
- Leroy Hodges – bass
- Michael Barar – viola
- Roy Brewer – violin
- Marc Franklin – trumpet
- Charles Hodges – Hammond B3
- Wesley Hovanec – assistant engineer, electric bongos, videography
- Jonathan Kirkscey – cello
- Beth Luscombe – viola
- Perry Margouleff – guitar, mixing, producer
- Lannie McMillan – tenor saxophone
- Susanna Perry-Gilmore – violin
- Jessie Munson – violin
- Royal horns – featured artist, horn
- Lester Snell – piano
- Gary Topper – tenor saxophone
- Archie Turner – Wurlitzer
- Mark Wallace – cello
- The Royal Singers – strings
- James L. Spake – baritone sax
- James Robertson – drums
- Steve Potts – drums
- Daniel Bean – assistant engineer
- Ryan Smith – mastering
- William Wittman – engineer, mixing

== Charts ==
Chart (2014)	Peak position
Australian Albums (ARIA)	92
UK Albums (Official Charts)	58
US Billboard 200	81
