= Jimmy Copley =

English rock drummer

James "Jimmy" Copley
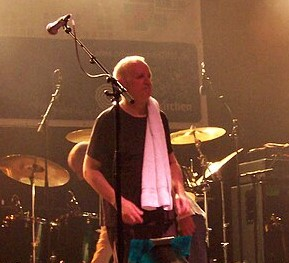
- Copley with Manfred Mann's Earth Band in 2010

Background information
- Also known as: Jim Copley
- Born: 29 December 1953; London, England
- Died: 13 May 2017 (aged 63) Bristol, England
- Occupation: Musician
- Spouse: Sachi Caroline Taylor (m. 1984; div. 2014)

James Frank Copley (29 December 1953 – 13 May 2017) was an English rock drummer.

Copley was largely a session musician and worked with Jeff Beck, Graham Parker, Upp, Paul Young, Magnum, Roger Glover, Ian Gillan and Glenn Hughes of Deep Purple, Go West, Killing Joke, Tears for Fears, Seal, Tony Iommi and Paul Rodgers. He was the drummer with Manfred Mann's Earth Band from 2007.

He was a master of the open-handed drumming technique. This method dispenses with crossing the hands when playing the hi-hat and snare drum simultaneously, as opposed to the more traditional way of playing drums which features crossed hands as the basic playing position.

Copley was a long-term Tama Drums endorser. He used Superstar, Granstar, Artstar II and Starclassic drums throughout the years. Another long time association was with Zildjian Cymbals. He also used Vic Firth drumsticks.

== Death ==
According to University Hospital Bristol, Copley had been diagnosed with leukemia in 2015 and relapsed following a bone marrow transplant. He opted to discontinue chemotherapy. In Copley's final days, his hospital room was transformed into a temporary recording studio so that he and friends could record an EP to benefit the Bristol Haematology and Oncology Centre and Royal United Hospital in Bristol.

== Selected discography ==
=== Upp ===
- Upp (1975)
- This Way Upp (1976)

=== Killing Joke ===
- Outside the Gate (1988)

=== Tears For Fears ===
- Tears for Fears: Live at Knebworth '90 (Change, Badman's Song, Everybody Wants to Rule the World) (1990)
- Going To California (Live from Santa Barbara) (1990)

=== Psychedelix ===
- Move On/Green Light (1992)
- Psychedelix (1992)
- no one's wastin' time (live album, 1992)
- Rowdy Boys (1993)
- Psychedelix II (1994)
- Livin' In Osaka (1994)
- Merry-Go-Round (1995)
- Stand (1995)
- Stand e.p. (1995)
- Smoky (1996)
- On-Gaeshi 1 (live album, 1999)
- On-Gaeshi 2 (live album, 1999)
- Edoya Collection 1992-1996 (1999)
- 20th March 1994 (live DVD, 2000)
- Move On Tour Stage 1 (live DVD, 2005)
- New Classics (2008)

=== Stone Free - Jimi Hendrix Tribute ===
- Stone Free - Jimi Hendrix Tribute (1993)

=== Curt Smith ===
- Soul on Board (1993)

=== Martin Page ===
- In the House of Stone and Light (1994)

=== The Pretenders ===
- Last of the Independents (1994)

=== Paul Rodgers ===
- Live: The Loreley Tapes (live album, 1996)
- Now (1997)
- Now and Live (2-CD compilation, 1997)
- Electric (2000)

=== Char ===
- Days Went By 1988-1993 (1993)
- 20th Anniversary "Electric Guitar Concert" (live album, 1997)
- Today (1998)
- Let It Blow (1998)
- Touch My Love Again (1999)
- I’m Gonna Take This Chance (1999)
- Char Edoya Collection 1988-1997 (1999)
- Char Plays Ballad (1999)
- 20th Anniversary "Electric Guitar Concert" (live DVD, 1999)
- Share The Wonder (2000)
- Char Played With And Without (live album, 2000)
- Bamboo Joints (2001)
- Char Psyche 1988 (live album, 2002)
- Live In Nippon Budokan 2001 "Bamboo Joints" (live DVD, 2002)
- Sacred Hills (2002)
- Mr.70’s You Set Me Free (2003)
- Singles 1976-2005 (2006)
- Tradrock "Jeff" by Char (2011)

=== Mayfield ===
- Mayfield (1998)

=== Tony Iommi ===
- Iommi (2000)
- The 1996 DEP Sessions (2004)

=== Go West ===
- The Best Of Go West - The Runaway Train Tour (1987)

=== Magnum ===
- Livin' The Dream (2005 live DVD)
- Princess Alice and the Broken Arrow (2007)

=== Jimmy Copley ===
- Slap My Hand (2008)

=== Jimmy Copley & Char ===
- Slap My Hand Special Session (live DVD, 2009)
