= Muddy Water Blues: A Tribute to Muddy Waters =

Studio album by Paul Rodgers
- Released: 1993
- Studio: One One One, North Hollywood; Record One, Sherman Oaks; Cherokee, Hollywood; The Mill and Metropolis, England; Ocean Way, Los Angeles; Cornerstone, Chatsworth; The Office, Van Nuys
- Genre: Blues-rock; blues
- Length: 65:49
- Label: Victory Music; 383480
- Producer: Billy Sherwood

Paul Rodgers chronology
Cut Loose (1983)	Muddy Water Blues: A Tribute to Muddy Waters (1993)	The Hendrix Set (1993)

Singles from Muddy Water Blues: A Tribute to Muddy Waters
- 1. "Muddy Water Blues" Released: 1993; 2. "The Hunter" Released: 1993

Professional ratings
Review scores
Source	Rating
Allmusic	4/5 stars

Muddy Water Blues: A Tribute to Muddy Waters is the second solo album by Paul Rodgers (of Free and Bad Company fame), consisting predominantly of covers of songs made famous by blues artist Muddy Waters. Although ostensibly a Rodgers solo effort, the album features many guest musicians including Jeff Beck, Jason Bonham, David Gilmour, Buddy Guy, Brian May, Steve Miller, Gary Moore, Trevor Rabin, Richie Sambora, Neal Schon, Brian Setzer and Slash. It was released in 1993.

As well as the standard one-disc release, a limited-edition version was released in Europe containing a second CD. The bonus disc, entitled Paul Rodgers: The History, features new re-recordings of several Free and Bad Company hits.

== Songs ==
While consisting mainly of covers, the album is book-ended by two versions of the original Rodgers composition "Muddy Water Blues", performed in acoustic and electric arrangements. A third version of the song, recorded live for the BBC and featuring Bryan Adams on guitar, was released on the CD single.

Among the tracks covered is the Albert King song "The Hunter", which Rodgers previously recorded with Free for their debut album Tons of Sobs. The song was a standard of Free's live performances, and would continue as a mainstay of Rodgers' solo tours. The year after the album was released, Rodgers performed "The Hunter" as part of his set at Woodstock '94, backed by Muddy Water Blues alumni Slash (who plays on the album version), Neal Schon and Jason Bonham, with Rodgers' former Free bandmate Andy Fraser on bass; this performance was included on the official album of the festival.

The album also features another Albert King staple, "Born Under a Bad Sign". Rodgers would go on to record this song in the studio at least a further two times, first on his own album The Royal Sessions in 2014, and later with Slash for the latter's 2024 blues covers album Orgy of the Damned.

== Track listing ==
Disc one – Muddy Water Blues: A Tribute to Muddy Waters
No.	Title	Writer(s)	Length
1.	"Muddy Water Blues" (with Buddy Guy)	Paul Rodgers	4:52
2.	"Louisiana Blues" (with Trevor Rabin)	Muddy Waters	4:02
3.	"I Can't Be Satisfied" (with Brian Setzer)	Waters	4:12
4.	"Rollin' Stone" (with Jeff Beck)	Waters	5:27
5.	"Good Morning Little School Girl (Part 1)" (with Jeff Beck)	Sonny Boy Williamson	4:03
6.	"I'm Your Hoochie Coochie Man" (with Steve Miller)	Willie Dixon	5:07
7.	"She's Alright" (with Trevor Rabin)	Waters	3:45
8.	"Standing Around Crying" (with David Gilmour)	Waters	6:24
9.	"The Hunter" (with Slash)	Booker T. Jones, Carl Wells, Al Jackson Jr., Donald Dunn, Steve Cropper	3:39
10.	"She Moves Me" (with Gary Moore)	Waters	4:49
11.	"I'm Ready" (with Brian May)	Dixon	2:59
12.	"I Just Want to Make Love to You" (with Jeff Beck)	Dixon	4:03
13.	"Born Under a Bad Sign" (with Neal Schon)	Jones, William Bell	4:45
14.	"Good Morning Little School Girl (Part 2)" (with Richie Sambora)	Williamson	3:03
15.	"Muddy Water Blues" (electric version; with Neal Schon)	Rodgers	4:48

Disc two – Paul Rodgers: The History
No.	Title	Writer(s)	Length
1.	"All Right Now"	Andy Fraser, Rodgers	7:15
2.	"Wishing Well"	Rodgers, Simon Kirke, Tetsu Yamauchi, John Bundrick, Paul Kossoff	4:08
3.	"Fire and Water"	Fraser, Rodgers	3:59
4.	"Bad Company"	Rodgers, Kirke	5:07
5.	"Feel Like Makin' Love"	Rodgers, Mick Ralphs	6:00
6.	"Can't Get Enough"	Ralphs	3:46

== Personnel ==
- Paul Rodgers - lead vocals, nylon guitar on "Muddy Water Blues", Rhodes guitar on "The Hunter", rhythm guitar on "The Hunter", Valdez guitar on "Muddy Water Blues" (electric version)
- Ian Hatton - rhythm guitar
- Pino Palladino - bass guitar
- Jason Bonham - drums
- Billy Sherwood - percussion
- Buddy Guy - lead guitar on "Muddy Water Blues"
- Trevor Rabin - lead guitar on "Louisiana Blues"
- Brian Setzer - lead guitar on "I Can't Be Satisfied"
- Jeff Beck - lead guitar on "Good Morning Little School Girl (Part 1)" and "I Just Want to Make Love to You"
- Steve Miller - lead guitar on "I'm Your Hoochie Coochie Man"
- David Gilmour - lead guitar on "Standing Around Crying"
- Slash - lead guitar on "The Hunter"
- Gary Moore - lead guitar on "She Moves Me"
- Brian May - lead guitar on "I'm Ready"
- Neal Schon - lead guitar on "Born Under a Bad Sign" and "Muddy Water Blues" (electric version)
- Richie Sambora - lead guitar on "Good Morning Little School Girl (Part 2)"
- Jimi Haun - rhythm guitar on "I'm Your Hoochie Coochie Man" and "Born Under a Bad Sign"
- Mark T. Williams - bass drum on "Muddy Water Blues" and "Good Morning Little School Girl (Part 1)", brushes on "Good Morning Little School Girl (Part 1)"
- Ronnie Foster - Hammond organ on "I'm Your Hoochie Coochie Man" and "Muddy Water Blues" (electric version)
- Paul Shaffer - Hammond organ on "Standing Around Crying"
- David Paich - piano on "Born Under a Bad Sign" and "Muddy Water Blues" (electric version), Hammond organ on "Born Under a Bad Sign"
- Jimmie Wood - harmonica on "I'm Your Hoochie Coochie Man" and "I'm Ready"
- Alexandra Brown - backing vocals on "Muddy Water Blues" and "Muddy Water Blues" (electric version)
- Carmen Carter - backing vocals on "Muddy Water Blues" and "Muddy Water Blues" (electric version)
- Jean McClain - backing vocals on "Muddy Water Blues" (electric version)
