= The Firm (rock band) =

British rock supergroup (1984–1986)

- L-R: Jimmy Page, Chris Slade, Paul Rodgers, and Tony Franklin, 1984.

Background information
- Origin: England
- Genres: Hard rock, blues rock
- Years active: 1984–1986
- Label: Atlantic
- Past members: Paul Rodgers; Jimmy Page; Tony Franklin; Chris Slade

The Firm were a British rock supergroup formed in 1984, featuring singer Paul Rodgers, guitarist Jimmy Page, drummer Chris Slade, and bassist Tony Franklin. The band released two albums in 1985 and 1986 and eventually saw their greatest chart success with the songs "Radioactive", "All the King's Horses", and "Satisfaction Guaranteed".

== History ==
In the early 1980s, Page and Rodgers were both dealing with the demise of their respective bands, Led Zeppelin and Bad Company. "Jimmy was at a bit of a loose end," recalled Rodgers of the band's formation. "He'd come round and check out my home studio and we ended up writing songs, but without any definite plans. Jimmy was very keen to get on the road, so we put a band together… The first thing I knew was that he had to be writing songs again. I'd already seen one of my friends going down that road in Koss, and it wasn't going to happen again." They initially wanted to form a band with Yes and King Crimson drummer Bill Bruford and bassist Pino Palladino but both were under contract with other acts.

Page and Rodgers consciously chose not to play material by their former bands and instead opted for a selection of Firm songs plus tracks from their solo albums; however, at least one performance of "Midnight Moonlight" featured sections of "White Summer" and "Kashmir", originally recorded by Page's former bands The Yardbirds and Led Zeppelin, respectively. The new songs were heavily infused with a soulful and commercially accessible sound, courtesy of Franklin's fretless bass guitar underpinning an understated song structure. Despite refusing to play old material, the last track from The Firm, "Midnight Moonlight", was originally an unreleased Led Zeppelin song entitled "Swan Song". This caused some critics to claim that Page had begun to run out of ideas.

In subsequent interviews, Page and Rodgers both indicated that the band was never meant to last more than two albums. After the band split, Page and Rodgers returned to solo work while Chris Slade joined AC/DC in 1989 and Franklin teamed up with guitarist John Sykes and drummer Carmine Appice in Blue Murder.

== Band members ==
- Paul Rodgers – lead vocals, rhythm guitar
- Jimmy Page – lead guitar, violin bow
- Tony Franklin – fretted and fretless bass guitar, keyboards, synthesizer, backing vocals
- Chris Slade – drums, percussion

== Films, DVDs ==
- The Firm Live at Hammersmith 1984 (1984) (limited release video)
- 5 from the Firm (1986)

== Official tours ==
- Europe (29 November 1984 – 9 December 1984)
- UK (1985)
  - The band played only two UK concerts on this tour: one at Middlesbrough Town Hall, and one at the London Hammersmith Odeon. In addition to Firm songs, the band played solo material by Rodgers and Page. This included Paul Rodgers singing "Live in Peace" from his earlier solo album.
- United States (14 March 1986 – 28 May 1986)

== Discography ==
=== Studio albums ===
Year	Album	Chart positions	
Year	Album	US	UK
1985	The Firm	17	15
1986	Mean Business	22	46

=== Singles ===
Year	Title	Chart positions		
Year	Title	US	US Rock	UK
1985	"Radioactive"	28	1	76
1985	"Closer"	-	19	-
1985	"Satisfaction Guaranteed"	73	4	-
1986	"All the King's Horses"	61	1	-
1986	"Live in Peace"	-	21	-
