= Jaz Lochrie =

Scottish bass guitarist (born 1960)

- Born: James Lochrie; 18 April 1960 (age 65); Paisley, Renfrewshire, Scotland
- Genres: Hard rock, Pop
- Occupation: Musician
- Instrument: Bass guitar
- Years active: 1980–present

Jaz Lochrie (born 18 April 1960) is a Scottish bass guitarist born in Paisley.

== Career ==
Lochrie has played variously in his career live or recording with Pete Townshend, Bad Company, Slash, Paul Rodgers, Roger Daltrey, Joe Satriani, British Rock Symphony, Yngwie Malmsteen, Gary Brooker, Zakk Wylde and many more. Credits include Bad Company, Go West, Psychedelix, Paul Rodgers, Pete Townshend, British Rock Symphony, Mamma Mia! The Musical, David Knopfler, Breathe and many others.

His son Ben Lochrie is a successful session guitarist and currently lead guitarist for 1980s band Go West.
