= Steve Albini discography =

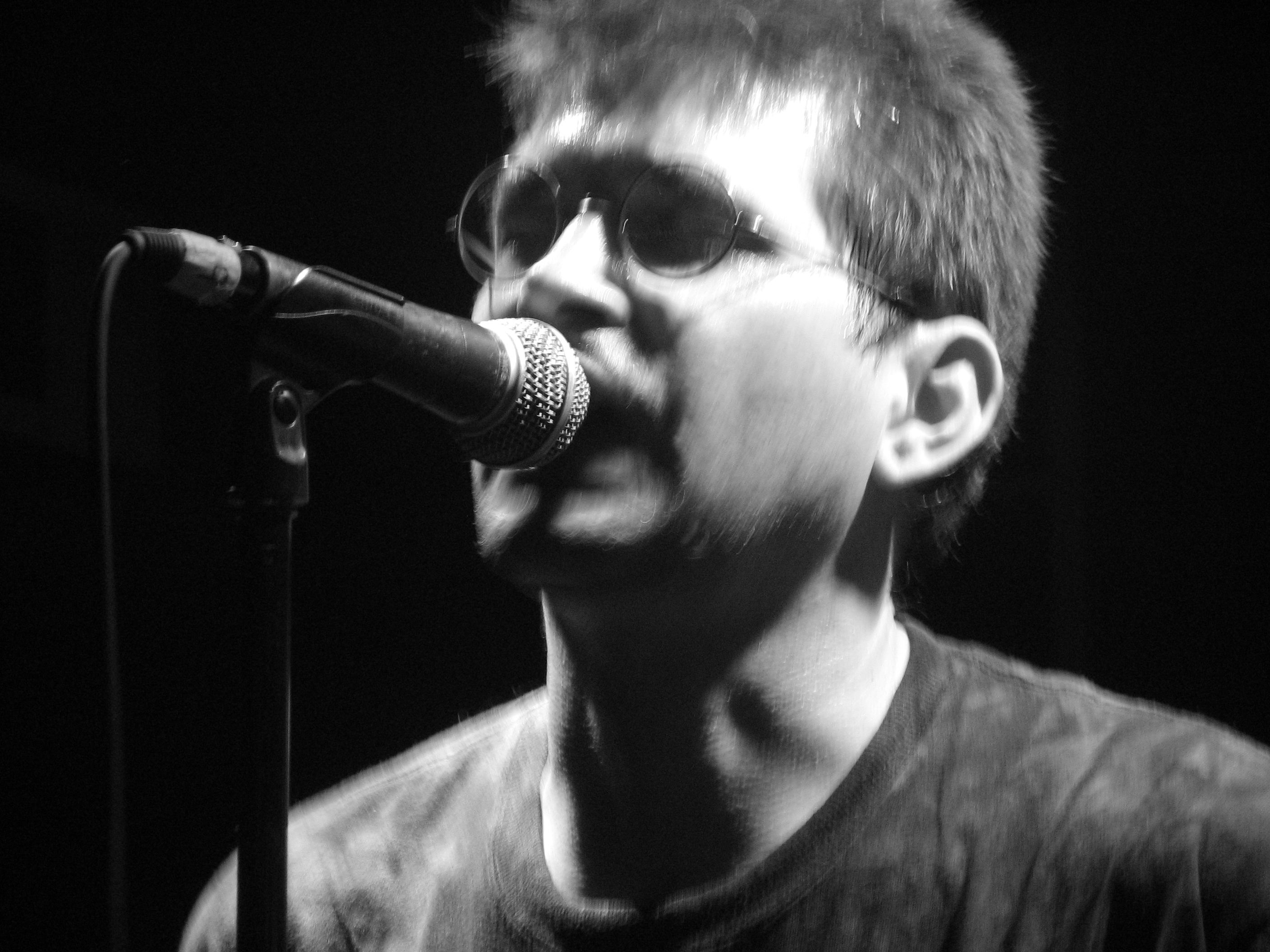
Albini in 2007 playing with Shellac

Steve Albini was an American musician, audio engineer, and music journalist, whose many recording projects have exerted an important influence on independent music since the 1980s. Most of his projects from 1997 onwards were recorded at the Electrical Audio studios in Chicago. Albini is occasionally credited as a record producer, though he disliked the term to describe his work, preferring the term "recording engineer" when credited, and refused to take royalties from bands recording in his studio, as he felt it would be unethical to do so.

As a musician, Albini fronted the bands Big Black, Rapeman, and Shellac on guitar and vocals. He also played on other projects from time to time, notably as a bass guitarist in the touring incarnation of Pete Conway's solo project Flour whose records he also engineered.

The list is in chronological order by date of release, but is incomplete.

== As a musician ==
=== Just Ducky, 1979–1980 (Missoula) ===
Year	Release	Label	Note
1987	Don't Worry Bowta Theng Mister	Cheese Cannon Records	Various Artists compilation, "To and Fro"
2022	Without Warning: Early Montana Punk, Postpunk, New Wave & Hardcore 1979-1991	Lost Sounds Montana	Various Artists compilation, "New Metro Stomp" and "Dog Food", recorded live at the Star Garage, Missoula, Montana, April 1980

=== Big Black, 1982–87 ===
Year	Release	Label	Format	Notes
1982	Lungs	Ruthless	12"	Reissued by Touch and Go in 1992 and 2012
1983	Bulldozer	Ruthless	12"	Reissued by Touch and Go in 1993 and 2012
1985	Racer-X	Homestead	12", cassette	Reissued by Touch and Go in 1992 and 2013
1985	"Rema Rema"	Forced Exposure	7"	
1985	The Hammer Party	Homestead	LP, cassette, CD	Reissued by Touch and Go in 1992
1985	"Il Duce" / "Big Money"	Homestead	7"	Reissued by Touch and Go in 1992
1986	Atomizer	Homestead	LP, cassette	Reissued by Touch and Go in 2015
1987	Sound of Impact	Blast First	LP	
1987	Headache	Touch and Go	12", cassette	Reissued in 2018
1987	"Heartbeat"	Touch and Go	7"	
1987	"He's a Whore" / "The Model"	Touch and Go	7"	
1987	Songs About Fucking	Touch and Go	LP, cassette, CD	Reissued in 2004 and 2018
1988	The Rich Man's Eight Track Tape	Homestead	CD	Reissued by Touch and Go in 2015
1992	Pigpile	Touch and Go	VHS, CD	Recorded live in 1987

=== Rapeman, 1987–89 ===
Year	Release	Label	Format	Note
1988	"Hated Chinee" / "Marmoset"	Touch and Go	7"	
1988	Budd	Touch and Go	12", cassette	Live (first three tracks), reissued in 2007
1988	Two Nuns and a Pack Mule	Touch and Go	LP, cassette, CD	
1989	"Inki's Butt Crack" / "Song Number One"	Sub Pop	7"	Singles Club release

=== Shellac, 1992–2024 ===
Year	Release	Label	Format	Note
1993	The Rude Gesture: A Pictorial History	Touch and Go	7"	
1993	Uranus	Touch and Go	7"	
1994	The Bird Is the Most Popular Finger	Drag City	7"	
1994	At Action Park	Touch and Go	LP, cassette, CD	
1994	Live at Tokyo	NUX Organization	CD	Japan-exclusive live album
1995	"Billiardspielerlied" / "Mantel"	Überschall	7"	
1997	Split with Mule	Touch and Go	7"	
1997	The Futurist	n/a	LP	Private release, given out to friends and family
1998	Terraform	Touch and Go	LP, CD	
2000	1000 Hurts	Touch and Go	LP, CD	
2001	Split with Caesar	Barbaraal	7"	
2002	All Tomorrow's Parties 2.0: Shellac Curated	ATP Recordings	CD	Compilation curated by Shellac
2007	Excellent Italian Greyhound	Touch and Go	LP, CD	
2014	Dude Incredible	Touch and Go	LP, CD	
2019	The End of Radio	Touch and Go	LP, CD	Includes recordings of their Peel Sessions in 1994 and 2004
2024	To All Trains	Touch and Go	LP, CD	

=== Other ===
- Pray I Don't Kill You Faggot by Run Nigger Run (Steve Albini and Nash Kato of Urge Overkill) on Tellus, The Audio Cassette Magazine #10 - All Guitars! (compilation album, 1985)
- Nutty About Lemurs by Steve Albini (solo) on Guitarrorists (compilation album, 1991)
- Music from Girl on the Third Floor (with Alison Chesley and Tim Midyett) on Touch and Go (soundtrack album, 2020)

== Credits on other artists' releases ==
=== 1980s ===
==== 1984 ====
Artist	Release	Format	Label	Credit
Various Artists	The Middle of America	LP	H.I.D. Productions	vocals, guitar, writer (tracks 13 and 14)

==== 1985 ====
Artist	Release	Format	Label	Credit
Breaking Circus	The Very Long Fuse	LP	Homestead	Artwork

==== 1986 ====
Artist	Release	Format	Label	Credits
Urge Overkill	Strange, I...	LP	Ruthless	Producer, credited as The Li'l Weed
Dark Arts	A Long Way From Brigadoon	LP	Ruthless	Artwork
Naked Raygun	All Rise	LP, CD	Homestead	Artwork
Various Artists	God's Favorite Dog	LP, cassette	Touch and Go	Performer (tracks 6 and 7)

==== 1987 ====
Artist	Release	Format	Label	Credits
Various Artists	Hog Butcher For The World	LP	Mad Queen	guitar (track 7)
Various Artists	Happiness Is Dry Pants	LP	Chemical Inbalance	vocals, guitar (track 2)
Various Artists	Head Over Ears (A Debris Compilation)	LP	Play Hard	writer (track 6)
Various Artists	The Wailing Ultimate! The Homestead Records Compilation	LP, CD, cassette	Homestead	guitar, vocals (track 6)

==== 1988 ====
Artist	Release	Format	Label	Credit
Pixies	Surfer Rosa	LP, CD, cassette	4AD	Producer, engineer
Head of David	Dustbowl	LP, CD	Blast First	Producer, credited as Steven Albini
Savage Pencil	Angel Dust (Music for Movie Bikers)	LP	Blast First	Liner notes
Gore	Wrede- The Cruel Peace	LP, CD	Megadisc	Producer
Various Artists	The End of Music (As We Know It)	LP, CD, cassette	ROIR/Danceteria	Liner notes
Pussy Galore/Black Snakes	Split	7"	Supernatural Organization	Producer
Bitch Magnet	Star Booty	LP	Roman Candle	Producer
Flour	Flour	LP	Touch and Go	Engineer
The Membranes	Kiss Ass... Godhead!	LP, CD, cassette	Homestead	Recording engineer
Various Artists	Mondostereo	LP	Tinnitus/Away From The Pulsebeat	Engineer, producer (track 13)

==== 1989 ====
Artist	Release	Format	Label	Credit
Tar	Handsome	LP	Amphetamine Reptile	Engineer (tracks 2, 3, 5, and 6)
Wreck	Wreck	EP	Play It Again Sam	Producer
The Jesus Lizard	Pure	EP	Touch and Go	Producer
Tad	"Wood Goblins" b/w "Cooking with Gas" plus "Daisy"	12" single	Glitterhouse	Recording engineer (tracks 1 and 2)
The Wedding Present	Bizarro	LP, CD, cassette	RCA	Engineer, re-recording of one song for single release
Ut	Griller	LP, CD	Blast First	Engineer
Poster Children	Flower Plower	LP, CD, cassette	Limited Potential	Producer, four songs
Sixteen Tons	4 Songs 16 Tons	7"	No Blow	Engineer, credited as S. Albini
Boss Hog	Drinkin', Lechin' & Lyin'	EP	Amphetamine Reptile	Recording engineer
Pussy Galore	Dial 'M' for Motherfucker	LP, CD	Caroline Records	Producer
Flea Circus	Slingshot	Cassette	n/a	Producer, recording engineer
Slint	Tweez	LP, CD, cassette	Jennifer Hartman Records	Engineer, credited as "some fuckin' derd niffer"
Band of Susans	Love Agenda	CD	Torso	Recording engineer (uncredited)

=== 1990s ===
==== 1990 ====
Artist	Release	Format	Label	Credit
The Breeders	Pod	LP, CD, cassette	RCA	Engineer
Boss Hog	Cold Hands	LP, CD, cassette	Amphetamine Reptile	Recording engineer, mixer
Flour	Luv 713	LP, CD, cassette	Touch and Go	Engineer
Sixteen Tons	Headshot	LP, CD	Abstract Sounds	Producer
The Jesus Lizard	Head	LP, cassette	Touch and Go	Engineer, producer
Tad	Salt Lick/God's Balls	LP, CD	Sub Pop	Producer
Whitehouse	Thank Your Lucky Stars	LP, CD	Susan Lawly	Producer, credited as S. Albini
Whitehouse	Cream of the Second Coming	LP, CD	Susan Lawly	Producer, credited as S. Albini
Wreck	Soul Train	LP, CD, cassette	Play It Again Sam	Producer
Pigface	Gub	LP, CD, cassette	Invisible	Engineer
Hum	Is Like Kissing An Angel (She Said)	Cassette	n/a	Recording engineer
Various Artists	Rubáiyát (Elektra's 40th Anniversary)	LP, CD	Elektra	Engineer
Tar	Roundhouse	CD	Amphetamine Reptile	Engineer
Mass	"Pulling/Thinking"	7"	No Blow	Remixer
Sludgeworth	"Sludgeworth"	7"	Roadkill	Producer
Theweddingpresent	3 Songs	LP, 7", CD, cassette	RCA	Engineer
Big Trouble House	"Watered Down"	7"	Community 3	Engineer
Masters of the Obvious	"She's Not Ready"	7"	Feel Good All Over	Producer
Poster Children	"Thinner, Stronger" b/w "Pointed Stick"	7"	Sub Pop	Producer
Bitch Magnet	Ben Hur	LP, CD, cassette	Glitterhouse	Recording engineer, credited as Arden Geist
Theweddingpresent	Brassneck	LP, CD, cassette	RCA	Engineer

==== 1991 ====
Artist	Release	Format	Label	Credit
Cath Carroll	England Made Me	LP, CD, cassette	Fantasy	Engineer, guitar
Whitehouse	Another Crack of the White Whip	CD	Susan Lawly	Writer
Whitehouse	"Still Going Strong"	7"	Susan Lawly	Writer
Chris Connelly	Whiplash Boychild	CD, cassette	Wax Trax!	Assistant engineer, guitar
The Jesus Lizard	Goat	LP, CD, cassette	Touch and Go	Producer
Poster Children	Daisychain Reaction	LP, CD, cassette	Twin/Tone	Engineer
Wreck	House of Boris	LP, CD, cassette	Wax Trax!	Producer
Theweddingpresent	"Dalliance"	7", CD, cassette	RCA	Engineer
Theweddingpresent	"Lovenest"	LP, CD	RCA	Engineer
Cheer-Accident	Dumb Ask	CD, cassette	Complacency	Engineer
Scrawl	Bloodsucker	LP, CD, cassette	Simple Machines	Recording engineer
Cheeze TM	Dancing with the Dead	7"	Bob Records	Engineer
Bewitched	Harshing My Mellow	CD, cassette	No. 6	Recording engineer
Sandy Duncan's Eye	Sandy Duncan's Eye	CD	Flipside	Recording engineer
Zeni Geva	Total Castration	CD	Public Bath	Engineer
Sometime Sweet Susan	Collide	LP	5th & National	Producer, engineer
Naked Vanilla	Wooly Metal	Cassette	n/a	Engineer
Dolomite	Venus	7"	Fiasco	Recording engineer, credited as Steve
The Didjits	Full Nelson Reilly	LP, CD, cassette	Touch and Go	Credited as Reggie Stiggs
The Wedding Present	Seamonsters	LP, CD	RCA	Engineer
The Mark of Cain	Incoming	CD	Dominator	Engineer
Superchunk	No Pocky for Kitty	LP, CD, cassette	Matador	Uncredited
Tar	Jackson	LP, CD, cassette	Amphetamine Reptile	Recording engineer
Volcano Suns	Career in Rock	LP, CD, cassette	Quarterstick	Recording engineer, credited as Torso Man
Urge Overkill	The Supersonic Storybook	LP, CD, cassette	Touch and Go	Uncredited

==== 1992 ====
Artist	Release	Format	Label	Credit
Things That Fall Down	Disbelief	LP, CD, cassette	Sonic Noise	Engineer
Various Artists	Follow Our Trax, Vol. 8: Another Disc, Another Planet	CD	Reprise	
Bewitched	Harshing My Mellow	CD, cassette	No.6	Recording engineer
Jon Spencer Blues Explosion	The Jon Spencer Blues Explosion	LP, CD, cassette	Caroline	Recording engineer
The Jesus Lizard	Liar	LP, CD, cassette	Touch and Go	Uncredited
Helmet	Meantime	LP, CD, cassette	Interscope	Recording engineer ("In The Meantime")
Mule	Mule	LP, CD, cassette	Quarterstick	credited as "Lenard Johns"
Thrillhammer	Giftless	LP, CD	Rough Trade	Recording engineer, credited as "Albini-San"
Failure	Comfort	LP, CD, cassette	Slash	Engineer
Braindamage	Signal de Revolta	CD	G.L.C.	Mixer
Zeni Geva	Nai-Ha	LP, CD	Nipp Guitar	Producer, engineer, guitar
Murder, Inc.	Murder, Inc.	LP, CD, cassette	Invisible	Recording engineer
Crain	Speed	LP, cassette	Automatic Wreckords	Recording engineer
Union Carbide Productions	Swing	CD, cassette	Radium 226.05	Producer, Recording engineer
Whitehouse	Twice Is Not Enough	CD	Susan Lawly	Producer, engineer ("Neronia")
Dazzling Killmen	Dig Out The Switch	LP, CD	Intellectual Convulsion	Recording engineer
Distorted Pony	Punishment Room	LP, CD	Bomp!	Producer, Recording engineer, credited as "bespectacled wisp of a fellow from the midwest"
Fugazi	In on the Kill Taker	Digital Download	Dischord	Recording engineer, unofficial recording only, band re-recorded the album for the official release. Digital download became available in March 2026 as a fundraiser for "Letters Charity"
Peter Sotos	Buyer's Market	CD	AWB	Producer

==== 1993 ====
Artist	Release	Format	Label	Credit
Murder Inc.	Murder Inc.	CD	Futurist	Recording engineer
Theweddingpresent	Hit Parade 3	CD, cassette	RCA	Producer
Big Boys	The Fat Elvis	CD, cassette	Touch and Go	Liner notes
Dazzling Killmen	"Medicine Me"	7"	Skin Graft	Recording engineer
The Jon Spencer Blues Explosion	Crypt-Style!	CD, LP	Crypt	Engineer (credited as Albini)
Shorty	"Kaput!"	7"	Skin Graft	
Crow	My Kind of Pain			
Engine Kid	Bear Catching Fish			Producer, uncredited
Craw	Craw			Producer, uncredited
Don Caballero	"Our Caballero" b/w "My Ten Year Old Lady Is Giving It Away"	7"		Producer, a-side only, uncredited
Don Caballero	"Andandandandandandandand" b/w "First Hits"			Producer, uncredited
Don Caballero	For Respect			Producer, uncredited
Screeching Weasel/Pink Lincolns	Split			Engineer, credited as A Skinny Bespectacled Guy
PJ Harvey	Rid of Me			Recording engineer, all but one song
Jawbreaker	24 Hour Revenge Therapy	CD, LP, cassette		Producer, credited as "Fluss"
Nirvana	In Utero	CD, LP, cassette	DGC	Producer, mixer, engineer
Nirvana	"Heart-Shaped Box"	CD, 7", cassette	Geffen	
Shadowy Men on a Shadowy Planet	Sport Fishin': The Lure of the Bait, The Luck of the Hook	CD, LP, cassette	Quarterstick	Recording engineer
King Cobb Steelie	n/a			Unofficial recording only, band chose to go with different producer
Shorty	"Thumb Days"			Mixer, credited as "Albhienni"
Urbn DK	Denial			Uncredited on release
Usherhouse	Molting			
Zeni Geva	Autofuck	7"		
Zeni Geva	Alright You Little Bastards			Guitar
Various Artists	1993 Mercury Music Prize: Shortlist Sampler			
Various Artists	Whip			

==== 1994 ====
Artist	Release	Format	Label	Credit
Gastr del Sol	Mirror Repair	CD, LP	Drag City	Recording engineer
Slint	Untitled	10", CD, cassette	Touch and Go	Engineer, uncredited
Nirvana	In Utero	CD, LP, cassette	DGC Records	Recording engineer
Mount Shasta	Put The Creep On	CD, cassette	Skin Graft	Producer
Dazzling Killmen	Face of Collapse	CD, LP, cassette	Skin Graft	Producer
Various Artists	The Beavis and Butt-Head Experience	CD, LP, cassette	Geffen Records	Producer (on track 1)
The Jesus Lizard	Down	CD, LP, cassette	Touch and Go	Producer, uncredited
Zeni Geva	Desire for Agony	CD, LP, cassette	Alternative Tentacles	Engineer
Brise-Glace	"In Sisters All And Felony"	7"	Skin Graft	Engineer
Space Streakings	7-Toku	CD, LP, cassette	Skin Graft	Engineer, recording engineer
Silkworm	Libertine	CD, LP	El Recordo	Recording engineer
Silkworm	In the West	CD, cassette	C/Z Records	Recording engineer, uncredited
Nirvana	"All Apologies"/"Rape Me"	CD, cassette	DGC Records	Recording engineer
The Jon Spencer Blues Explosion	The Jon Spencer Blues Explosion	CD, LP, cassette	Caroline Records	Recording engineer, mixer
Nirvana	"Pennyroyal Tea"	CD	Geffen Records	Recording engineer
Craw	Lost Nation Road	LP	Choke	Engineer
Various Artists	Wohlstand	CD	Human Wrechords	Producer (on track 10)
DQE	But Me, I Fell Down	CD, LP	Hoppel Di Hoy	Producer
Steel Pole Bath Tub	Some Cocktail Suggestions	CD, 10" cassette	Boner Records	Featured
Shorty	Fresh Breath	10", cassette	Skin Graft	Recording engineer, producer, credited as "Albhienni of Francisco"
Balloon Guy	Boogie, Rock	2x7"	Generator	Recording engineer (tracks 1–3)
Morsel	Noise Floor	CD	Choke	Recording engineer (tracks 1–4, 6, 8–10)
Nirvana	In Utero Demos	CD	Collectors Pleasure	Producer, unofficial release
Souls	Tjitchischtsiy (Sudêk)	CD, LP	Telegram Records	Engineer, producer, mixer
Various Artists	You Got Lucky: A Tribute to Tom Petty	CD, cassette	Scotti Bros./Alleged/Backyard	Recording engineer (track 6)
Slapshot	Unconsciousness	CD, LP	We Bite Records	Recording engineer
Stinking Lizaveta	"Refinery"/"Crooked Teeth"	7"	Tolotta Records	Recording engineer
Brise-Glace	When in Vanitas...	CD, LP	Skin Graft	Engineer
Bubble Gum Thunder	"Coward"/"Cheater"	7"	Model Rocket	Recording engineer
Various Artists	Rock and Roll Super Highway	CD	God Damn Right!	Recording engineer (track 9)
Gaunt	Sob Story	CD, LP	Thrill Jockey/Crypt Records	Recording engineer, credited as "Steve"
Fiddlehead	The Deaf Waiter	CD, 10"	Allied Recordings	Recording engineer
Jack 'o' Nuts	On You	CD, LP, cassette	Radial Records	Producer, engineer, credited as "S Albini"
Various Artists	For a Life of Sin	CD	Bloodshot Records	Recording engineer (track 6)
The Breeders	"No Aloha"	CD	4AD	Engineer (track 2)
Deerheart	"Male"	7"	Goldenrod Records	Engineer
Union Carbide Productions	The Albini Swing	CD	Radium 226.05	Producer, mixer, recording engineer
Stinking Lizaveta	"Sink"	7"	Egg Yolk Records	Recording engineer
Nirvana	Heart-Shaped Box Vol. 2	4xCD	Kiwi Records	Recording engineer (tracks 2.5-2.19), unofficial release
Whitehouse	Halogen	CD, LP	Susan Lawly	Co-producer
Sissy	Hunky Cop	CD	n/a	Producer
Flac	"Pilot"/"Toothbrush"	7"	Hybrid Music Co.	Recording producer

==== 1995 ====
Artist	Release	Format	Label	Credit
Whitehouse	Quality Time	CD	Susan Lawly	Co-producer
Tortoise	Rhythms, Resolutions, & Clusters	CD, LP	Thrill Jockey	Remixer (track 4)
Jim O'Rourke, Richard Youngs, Faust, & Keith Rowe	"In God We Trust"	7"	Table of the Elements	Engineer
Man or Astro-man?	Project Infinity	CD, LP	Estrus Records	Recording engineer (tracks 2, 6, 8)
Zeni Geva	Freedom Bondage	CD, LP	Alternative Tentacles	Producer
Los Crudos/Spitboy	Viviendo Asperamente	LP	Ebullition Records	Recording engineer, mixer, credited as Steve (tracks 12–18)
Screeching Weasel	Kill the Musicians	CD	Lookout! Records	Engineer (track 12)
Various Artists	A Means to an End: The Music of Joy Division	CD, LP	Virgin Records	Recording engineer (track 11)
Palace Music	Viva Last Blues	CD, LP	Domino/Drag City/Palace Records	Producer
Oxbow	Let Me Be a Woman	CD, LP	Brinkman Records	Recording engineer
Tony Conrad	Slapping Pythagoras	CD	Table of the Elements	Recording engineer
Palace	"Mountain"	7", CD	Palace Records	Recording engineer (track 1)
Uzeda	4	CD, LP	Touch and Go	Recording engineer
Pixies	Rough Diamonds (Studio Sessions 1987-1991)	CD	Blue Moon Records	Engineer (track 23), uncredited, unofficial release
The Auteurs	Back With The Killer E.P.	CD, 7", cassette	Hut Recordings/Virgin	Recording engineer (track 1)
God Bullies	"Millenium"	7"	Radial Records	Mixer
Various Artists	Bad Sun Rising II	CD	Nipp Guitar	Producer (tracks 1–7, 9), featured (track 8)
Various Artists	Homage: Lots of Bands Doing Descendents's Songs	CD	Coolidge Records	Recording engineer (track 14)
18th Dye	"Play w/ You" b/w "Gout S.F."/"F"	CD, 7", cassette	ché	Producer (track 1)
Gaunt	I Can See Your Mom From Here	CD, LP	Thrill Jockey	Recording engineer, credited as "Steve"
Yona-Kit	Yona-Kit	CD, LP	Skin Graft	Recording engineer
Various Artists	Does The Word Duh Mean Anything To You?: Another Che Compilation	CD	ché	Producer (tracks 3 & 4)
18th Dye	Tribute to a Bus	CD, LP, cassette	ché/Matador/Cloudland	Recording engineer
The Effigies	Remains Nonviewable	CD, cassette	Touch and Go	Liner notes
Killdozer	God Hears Pleas of the Innocent	CD, LP, cassette	Touch and Go	Recording engineer, mixer
Superchunk	Incidental Music 1991–95	CD, cassette	Merge Records	Recording engineer (track 15)
Melt-Banana	Scratch or Stitch	CD, LP	Skin Graft	Recording engineer
Cheer-Accident	Dumb Ask	CD, LP, cassette	Neat Metal	Co-Producer
Thrush Hermit	The Great Pacific Ocean	CD, LP, cassette	Murderecords	Recording engineer
The Martians	Low Budget Stunt King	CD	Allied Recordings	Recording engineer (tracks 1–8)
Various Artists	Dad, Are We Punk Yet?	CD, LP	Harmless Records	Recording engineer (track 5)
Skippies/Sloy/Cut The Navel String	"On Tourne (Hot)"	CD	Roadrunner Records	Producer (track 2)
Sloy	"Pop"	CD	Roadrunner Records	Producer, uncredited (tracks 1 & 2)
Absolute Grey	Broken Promise: An Absolute Grey Anthology ...1984-87	2xCD	Strange Ways Records	Liner notes
Grind	Creampetal	CD	AGM Music	Recording engineer
Quint	"Blueprint to a Blackout"/"Sawtooth"	7"	Southern Records	Engineer
Les Thugs	Strike	CD, LP, cassette	Roadrunner Records	Recording engineer, mixer
Table	Table		Humble	
The Fleshtones	Laboratory of Sound		Ichiban International	
Lizard Music	Fashionably Lame		World Domination Recordings	
Jaks	Hollywood Blood Capsules		Choke	
Hamlet Idiot	"Don't Let Them"	7"	Chunk Records	
Hegoat	"Edict"	7"	Allied Recordings	
Lizard Train	Everything Moves	CD	Shagpile	
Various Artists	Hot Rock Action Vol. 1	7"	Reptilian Records	
Dis-/Panel Donor	"Suddenly, Everyone Is A Smoker"/"L.T. Weightman"	7"	Lombardi Recordings	
Nirvana	Singles	6xCD	Geffen Records	
Various Artists	Bad Sun Rising	CD	Nipp Guitar	
Various Artists	TDK's Ultimate Guide to Great Sound		TDK	
Various Artists	Socket	CD	Lombardi Recordings	
Sloy	Plug		Roadrunner Records	
Fix Your Wagon	Pillow Talk	CD	Crank Records	
Funhouse	Poet Is Dead		Nipp Guitar	
Lizard Train	Inertia	CD	Shagpile	
Lizard Music	Is Coming	CD	World Domination Recordings	
Mound	"Drag The River"/"Sweet Occasion"	7"	Transmission Recordings	
D.O.P.E.	Resination	CD	Anti-Gravity Records	

==== 1996 ====
Artist	Release	Format	Label	Credit
The Auteurs	After Murder Park	CD, LP, cassette	Hut Recordings	Recording engineer
Laurels	L	CD	Thick Records	Recording engineer (tracks 2, 3, 7, 10, 13)
Palace Music	Arise Therefore	CD, LP	Domino	Recording engineer
Oxbow	Serenade in Red	CD, LP	Pop Biz	Recording engineer
Rosa Mota	Bionic	CD	13th Hour Recordings	Recording engineer, mixing
Rosa Mota	"Space Junk"	CD, 7"	13th Hour Recordings	Recording engineer, mixing
Whitehouse	"Just Like A Cunt"	CD	Fanatics	Recording engineer
Tortoise	A Digest Compendium of the Tortoise's World	CD	Thrill Jockey	Remixer (track 10)
Gold Blade	"Black Elvis"	CD, 7"	Ultimate	Recording engineer
Bodychoke	Five Prostitutes	CD	Freek Records	Recording engineer
Various Artists	Shots In The Dark	CD	Donna	Producer (track 12)
Various Artists	Cloud 9	Cassette	Select Magazine	Recording engineer, mixning
Various Artists	The Lounge Ax Defense & Relocation Compact Disc	CD	Touch and Go	Guitar, vocals (track 2)
Oxbow	"Insylum"	10"	Crippled Dick Hot Wax!	Recording engineer (track 2)
Robbie Fulks	Country Love Songs			
Big'n	Discipline Through Sound	CD, LP	Skin Graft Records/Gasoline Boost Records	Recording engineer, credited as Inibla Nevets (Steve Albini backwards)
Various Artists	Direction	CD, LP	Polyvinyl Record Company	Recording engineer, credited as Steve
Silkworm	Firewater	LP, cassette	Matador	Recording engineer
Bodychoke	Five Prostitutes			
A Minor Forest	Flemish Altruism (Constituent Parts 1993–1996)	CD, LP	Thrill Jockey	Recording engineer (even-numbered tracks)
Various Artists	Ground Rule Double	CD, LP	Divot/ActionBoy300 Records	Recording engineer (tracks 12, 20)
Various Artists	Ox-Compilation #24: Bombenleger	CD	Ox Fanzine	Producer (track 7)
Man or Astro-Man?	The Sounds of Tomorrow	7"	Estrus Records	Recording engineer, credited as Professor S. Albini
Man of Astro-Man?	Experiment Zero			Recording engineer
Phono-Comb	Fresh Gasoline			
Brainiac	Hissing Prigs in Static Couture	CD, LP	Touch and Go	Recording engineer (track 5)
Dis-	Historically Troubled Third Album			
Splendorbin	Stealth			
Stinking Lizaveta	...Hopelessness and Shame.	CD	Compulsiv Music	Recording engineer, mixing
Various Artists	In Defense of Animals, Vol. 2	CD	Play It Again Sam Records	Recording engineer (track 10)
The Union	In Terminus GA, 1997			Vocals, mixing
Various Artists	Jabberjaw Compilation Vol. 2: Pure Sweet Hell			
Fred Schneider	Just...Fred	CD, LP, cassette	Reprise Records	Producer
Smog	Kicking a Couple Around	CD, LP	Drag City	Recording engineer (tracks 2–4)
Mandingo	Macho Grande			
Cheer-Accident	Not a Food			
Ativin	Pills vs. Planes	CD	Polyvinyl Record Company	Recording engineer (tracks 1–4)
Sloy	Planet of Tubes	CD, LP, cassette	PIAS France	Producer (uncredited)
Bush	Razorblade Suitcase	CD, LP, cassette	Trauma Records/Interscope Records	Recording engineer
Dazzling Killmen	Recuerda	CD	Skin Graft Records	Recording engineer (tracks 1–3)
Pixies	"Debaser"	LP	4AD	Producer (track 3)
The Mark of Cain	Rock & Roll			
Various Artists	Shots In The Dark			
Shakuhachi Surprise	Space Streakings Sighted Over Mount Shasta	CD, LP	Skin Graft	Recording engineer, credited as Steve Albinary
Bush	"Swallowed"			
Hubcap	Those Kids are Weird	LP	ActionBoy300 Records	Recording engineer (all but last song)
Low	Transmission	CD	Vernon Yard Recordings	Artwork, credited as Steve
Scrawl	Travel On, Rider	CD	Elektra	Recording engineer (tracks 2, 5–7, 9–12)
Scrawl	Travel On Scrawl	CD	Elektra	Recording engineer (tracks 2 and 4)
Guided by Voices	Under the Bushes Under the Stars			two songs, credited as Fluss
Vent 414	Vent 414	CD, LP	Polydor	Recording engineer (tracks 2, 3, 5–13)
Vent 414	"Life Before You"	CD, 7"	Polydor	Recording engineer
Various Artists	Audio CD	CD	Audio Magazine	Producer (track 14)
Killdozer & Ritual Device	When the Levee Breaks			
Veruca Salt	Blow It Out Your Ass It's Veruca Salt	CD	DGC Records	
Burning Witch	Towers...			
Wuhling	Extra 6			
Cord	Easy Living On 101			

==== 1997 ====
Artist	Release	Format	Label	Credit
Souls	Bird Fish or In Between			
Bokomelch	Jet Lag			
Cheap Trick	"Baby Talk" b/w "Brontosaurus"			
Cheap Trick	unreleased re-recording of In Color			
Craw	Map, Monitor, Surge			
Darling Little Jackhammer	Criminally Easy To Please			
Ein Heit	Lighting and the Sun			
Great Unraveling	Great Unraveling			
Pegboy	Cha Cha Damore			
Pixies	Death to the Pixies			Recording engineer
P.W. Long's Reelfoot	We Didn't See You On Sunday			
Silkworm	Developer			
Solar Race	Homespun			
Spider Virus	Electric Erection			
Storm & Stress	Storm & Stress			
Various Artists	Guide to Fast Living, Vol. 2			
Various Artists	The Jackal			
Dianogah	As Seen from Above			
La Gritona	Arrasa Con Todo			
Wuhling	Extra 6		Touch and Go	
Bush	"Greedy Fly"	CD, cassette	Trauma Records	

==== 1998 ====
Artist	Release	Format	Label	Credit
Pansy Division	Absurd Pop Song Romance	CD		
Various Artists	Music From and Inspired by The Jackal	CD	n/a	Recording engineer
Whitehouse	Mummy and Daddy	CD	Susan Lawly	Recording engineer ("Private")
Pedro, Muriel, & Esther	The White To Be Angry			
Jon Spencer Blues Explosion	Acme	CD, LP, cassette	Matador	Mixer
Ballydowse	The Land, The Bread, and The People			
Young Dubliners	Alive Alive O			
Silver Apples	Beacon			
Uzeda	Different Section Wires			
Silkworm	Even a Blind Chicken Finds a Kernel of Corn: 1990-1994			
Eclectics	Idle Worship			
Will Oldham	Little Joya			
Pansy Division	More Lovin' from Our Oven			
Plush	More You Becomes You	CD, LP	Domino	Recording engineer
Dirty Three	Ocean Songs			
The Sadies	Precious Moments			
Various Artists	Smash Your Radio: Jump Up! Sampler			
Bert	Bert		Pinebox	
Cordelia's Dad	Spine			
The Ex	Starters Alternators			
The Traitors	Traitors			
Dirty Three	Ufkuko			
Joel RL Phelps and the Downer Trio	3			
Jimmy Page & Robert Plant	Walking into Clarksdale			
Mount Shasta	Watch Out			Credited as Debbie Albini
Vandal X	Songs from the Heart			
Bedhead	Transaction de Novo			
.22	Watertown			
Bedhead	Lepidoptera	10"	Trance Syndicate	
Jon Spencer Blues Explosion	Magical Colors			

==== 1999 ====
Artist	Release	Format	Label	Credit
Teenage Frames	1% Faster			
Fun People	The Art(e) of Romance			
Chisel Drill Hammer	Chisel Drill Hammer			
Early Lines	Are Tired Beasts			
Filibuster	Deadly HiFi			
Jon Spencer Blues Explosion	Emergency Call From Japan			
Neurosis	Times of Grace			
The Bollweevils	History of the Bollweevils, Vol. 2			
Distortion Felix	I'm an Athlete			
Ensimi	BMX			
Murder, Inc.	Locate Subvert Terminate: The Complete Murder, Inc.			
Nina Nastasia	Dogs			
Neutrino	Motion Picture Soundtrack			
Chevelle	Point #1			
Various Artists	Poor Little Knitter on the Road: A Tribute to the Kni			
The Sadies	Pure Diamond Gold			
Low	Secret Name			
Don Caballero	Singles Breaking Up (Vol. 1)			Recording engineer (uncredited)
Ativin	Summing the Approach			
Pezz	Warmth & Sincerity			
Hosemobile	What Can & Can't Go On			
Jon Spencer Blues Explosion	Xtra Acme USA			Recording engineer (seven songs)
Dragbody	Flip The Kill Switch			
New Brutalism	A Diagram Without Scale or Dimension			
Pugs	Chimato Kubiki			

=== 2000s ===
==== 2000 ====
Artist	Release	Format	Label	Credit
Will Oldham & Rian Murphy	Almost Heaven	CD, 12"	Drag City	Engineer
Various Artists	Best Anthems... Ever!			
Cinerama	Disco Volante			
Don Caballero	American Don	CD, LP	Touch and Go	Recording engineer
Man or Astro-man?	A Spectrum of Infinite Scale	CD, 10"	Touch and Go	Recording engineer (credited as Dr. Stephen Albini)
Neurosis	Sovereign	CD, LP, cassette	Music For Nations/Hydra Head	Engineer
Goatsnake/Burning Witch	Split	CD, 12"	Hydra Head	Recording engineer
Cinerama	"Wow"	CD	Scopitones	
Cinerama	"Lollobridiga"	CD	Scopitones	
Cinerama	"Your Charms"	CD	Scopitones	
Dianogah	Battle Champions	CD, LP	Southern	
Caesar	Leaving Sparks	CD	Excelsior	
Flogging Molly	Swagger	CD, LP, cassette	SideOneDummy	
Cheer-Accident	Salad Days !!	CD	Skin Graft	
Pinebender	Things Are About to Get Weird	CD	Ohio Gold	
Papa M	Live from a Shark Cage	Cassette	Sound Improvement	
Silkworm	Lifestyle	CD, LP	Touch and Go	
XBXRX	Gop Ist Minee	CD, LP	Tapes Records	
Cinerama	Disco Volante	CD, LP	Scopitones	
Shannon Wright	Maps of Tacit	CD	Quarterstick	
Will Oldham	Guarapero: Lost Blues 2	CD, LP	Drag City/Palace	
Screeching Weasel	Thank You Very Little	CD	Lookout!	
The Bomb	Torch Song	CD	Jettison Music	
Caesar	(the) Stellar Road (e.p.)	CD	Excelsior	
Bride of No No	B.O.N.N. Apetit!	CD, LP	Atavistic	
The Membranes	Kiss Ass, Godhead!	CD	Overground	
Destro 1	Start the Whole Mechanical Sequence	CD	Radio is Down	
Dirty Old Man River	Ageless	CD	Radial	
Dragbody	Flip the Kill Switch	CD	Overcome	
Neurosis	Times of Grace	CD	Relapse	
Loraxx	Yellville	CD	Automatic Combustioneer	
The Bennies	Fossil Record	CD	Not on Label	
Fun People	The Art(e) of Romance	CD	Ugly/Highlight Sounds	
Robbie Fulks	13 Hillbilly Giants	CD	Boondoggle	
fra-foa	青白い月	CD	Toy's Factory	
Early Lines	Are Tired Beasts	CD	Deep East	
The Jon Spencer Blues Explosion	"Magical Colours" b/w "Confused"	7"		

==== 2001 ====
Artist	Release	Format	Label	Credit
Labradford	Fixed::Context	CD, LP	Kranky/Mute	
Various Artists	All Tomorrow's Parties 1.0	CD	ATP Recordings	
Whitehouse	Cruise	CD	Susan Lawly	"Public"
Low	Things We Lost in the Fire	CD, LP	Kranky	
Pigface	The Best of Pigface: Preaching to the Perverted	CD	Invisible	
Various Artists	Rough Trade Shops: 25 Years	CD	Mute	
Dianogah	"Hannibal"	7"	Southern	
Mogwai	"My Father My King"	CD, 12"	Rock Action	
Zeni Geva	10,000 Light Years	CD	Neurot	
Owls	Owls	CD	Jade Tree	
Cinerama	"Superman"	CD, 7"	Scopitones	
Early Lines	Hate the Living, Love the Dead			
The Bottletones	Adult Time			
The Meat Joy	Between the Devil and the Deep	CD	All Night Riot	
Robbie Fulks	Couples in Trouble	CD	Boondoggle	
Joan of Arse	Distant Hearts, a Little Closer	CD, LP	Scientific Laboratories	
The Ex	Dizzy Spells	CD	Ex Records	
Cinerama	"Health and Efficiency"	CD, 7"	Scopitones	
The New Year	Newness Ends	CD, LP	Touch and Go	
Shannon Wright	Dyed in the Wool	CD	Quaterstick	
Maestro Echoplex	Last Night I Saw God On The Dance Floor	CD	Android Eats	
Post Diluvian	Means of Production	CD	1970 Recordings	
Edith Frost	Wonder Wonder	CD, LP	Drag City	
mclusky	"Lightsabre Cocksucking Blues"	7"	Too Pure	
Beachbuggy	Sport Fury	CD	Sony Music	
The Danielson Famile	Fetch the Compass Kids	CD, LP	Secretly Canadian	
The Frames	For The Birds	CD, LP	Overcoat Recordings	
Elysian Fields	Clinical Trial	CDr	n/a	
Sonna	We Sing Loud, Sing Soft Tonight	CD, LP	Temporary Residence Limited	
Hubcap	Hatest Grits (Those Kids Are Wierder)	CD	54º40' Or Fight!	
Neurosis	A Sun That Never Sets	CD, LP	Relapse	
The Sadies	Tremendous Efforts	CD	Outside Music	
Portastatic featuring Ken Vandermark and Tim Mulvenna	The Perfect Little Door	CD	Merge	
Chestnut Station	In Your Living Room	CD	Drag City	
Dirty Three	Ocean Songs	CD	THOK	
Steve Fanagan	There Is Hope	CD	Mango Music	
The Frames	"Lay Me Down"	CD	Plateau	
The Traitors	Everything Went Shit: Lost and Collected Tracks	CD	Johanns Face	
fra-foa	宙の淵	CD	Toy's Factory	three songs
.22	The Worker	CD	The Roydale Recording Company Corporation, Inc.	
Beachbuggy	"From the South"	7"	Poptones	
Honey For Petzi	Heal All Monsters	CD	Gentleman/Supermodern/Aerinsk	
Adrian Crowley	When You Are Here You Are Family	CD	Bed of Rockets	
Various Artists	Explanation of Scientific Explosion: Chicago-Midwest	CD	Contact	
Hero of a Hundred Fights	The Remote, The Cold	CD	Divot	
Trend 86	Adobe	CD	n/a	
Robbie Fulks	13 Hillbilly Gioants	CD	Bloodshot	
The Quarterhouse	I Was On Fire For You	CD	Radio is Down	
Xenton	Untitled	CD	Fraction Bar	
Ballydowse	Out of the Fertile Crescent			
Danielson Famile	Fetch the Compass Kids			
Double Life	III Song EP			
Edith Frost	Wonder Wonder			
Point 22	Worker			
Rye Coalition	"ZZ Topless" / "Snowjob"	7"		
The Black Lungs	Unreleased album			
Technician	Opposition EP			
Saturnine	Pleasure of Ruins			

==== 2002 ====
Artist	Release	Format	Label	Credit
Glen Meadmore	Cowboy Songs for Little Hustlers			
Nina Nastasia	The Blackened Air			
Flogging Molly	Drunken Lullabies			
Jawbreaker	Etc.			
Plush	Fed			
Goatsnake/Burning Witch	Goatsnake/Burning Witch			
Silkworm	Italian Platinum			
Giddy Motors	Make It Pop			
Mclusky	Mclusky Do Dallas			
Various Artists	Membranaphonics			
Rye Coalition	On Top			
Portastatic	Perfect Little Door			
Milemarker	Satanic Versus			
The Quarterhorse	I Was On Fire For You			
Bellini	Snowing Sun			
Sonic Mook Experiment	Sonic Mook Experiment 2: Future Rock & Roll			
Vermillion	Flattening Mountains and Creating Empires			
54-71	enClorox			
Beachbuggy	Sport Fury			
The Ghost	This Is a Hospital			
Bloodlet	Three Humid Nights in the Cypress Trees			
The Breeders	Title TK			
Cinerama	Torino			
Cordelia's Dad	What It Is			
Adrian Crowley	When You Are Here You Are Family			
Godspeed You! Black Emperor	Yanqui U.X.O.			
Zu	Igneo			
Dionysos	Western sous la neige			
Dead Man Ray	Cago			
Jon Spencer Blues Explosion	Plastic Fang			
Nirvana	Nirvana			Recording engineer (four songs)
Brick Layer Cake	Whatchamacallit			

==== 2003 ====
- Sylvan – The Ugly Lemon
- Early Lines – Pure Health
- Subersive – Antihero
- Cinerama – Cinerama Holiday
- Ring, Cicada – Good Morning Mr. Good
- The Heavils – Heavils
- Original Score – Hell House
- Scout Niblett – I Am
- Valina – Vagabond
- The Forms – Icarus
- Duenow – If You Could Only See What They Are Doing to You
- Cheer-Accident – Introducing Lemon
- Songs: Ohia – The Magnolia Electric Co.
- Pepito – Migrante
- Dysrhythmia – Pretest
- The Frames – The Roads Outgrown
- Nina Nastasia – Run to Ruin
- Sonna – Smile and the World Smiles with You
- Cheap Trick – Special One
- The Desert Fathers – Spirituality
- F-Minus – Sweating Blood
- Transit Belle – Transit Belle
- F-Minus – Wake Up Screaming
- Rope – Widow's First Dawn
- Various Artists – Wig in a Box
- Federation X – X Patriot
- Purplene – Purplene
- The Hidden – Hymnal EP
- Red Swan – Michigan Blood Games
- 12Twelve – Speritismo
- Chevreuil – Chateauvallon
- Whitehouse – Bird Seed (title track only)
- A Whisper in the Noise – Through the Ides of March
- Berkeley – Hopes, Prayers and Bubblegum
- Three Second Kiss – Music out of Music
- Uncommonmenfrommars – Kill the Fuze

==== 2004 ====
- yourcodenameis:milo – All Roads to Fault
- Living Things – Black Skies in Broad Daylight
- mclusky – The Difference Between Me and You Is That I'm Not on Fire
- Neurosis – The Eye of Every Storm
- Bear Claw – Find The Sun
- Leftöver Crack – Fuck World Trade
- Various Artists – How Soon Is Now?: The Songs of the Smiths By...
- Living Things – I Owe
- Silkworm – It'll Be Cool
- Haymarket Riot – Mog
- Various Artists – Neurot Recordings
- Various Artists – No Depression: What It Sounds Like, Vol. 1
- Shannon Wright – Over the Sun
- 0.22 – Patriots
- Electrelane – The Power Out
- Various Artists – TRR50: Thank You
- The Ex – Turn
- Amber – Putting All the Pieces Together
- La Habitación Roja – Nuevos Tiempos
- Plush – Underfed
- Helmet – Unsung: The Best of Helmet (1991–1997)
- Scout Niblett – Uptown Top Ranking
- Mono – Walking Cloud and Deep Red Sky, Flag Fluttered and the Sun Shined
- Pixies – Wave of Mutilation: Best of Pixies
- Saeta – We Are Waiting All for Hope
- Chauncey – My Radio (Everything I Know)
- Nirvana – With the Lights Out
- Wrangler Brutes – Zulu
- Bright Channel – Bright Channel
- Phillip Roebuck – One-man band
- Senator – United Wire
- Father Divine – The Paradigm Shift
- The New Year - The End Is Near

==== 2005 ====
- Living Things – Ahead of the Lions
- BANG sugar BANG – Victory Gin
- Electrelane – Axes
- Kash – Beauty Is Everywhere/Kash
- High on Fire – Blessed Black Wings
- Terry Stamp – Bootlace Johnnie & The Ninety-Nines
- The Ponys – Celebration Castle
- Gogol Bordello – East Infection
- The Hidden – Smash to Ashes
- Gogol Bordello – Gypsy Punks: Underdog World Strike
- Wonderful Smith – Hello, It's Wonderful
- Jaks – Here Lies the Body of Jaks
- Scout Niblett – Kidnapped by Neptune
- The Patsys – On The 13th Kick
- Make Believe – Shock of Being
- Bellini – Small Stones
- Magnolia Electric Co – What Comes After the Blues
- Cinerama – Don't Touch That Dial
- Spy – Spy
- From Fiction – Bloodwork
- Boxes – Bad Blood
- Die! Die! Die! – Die! Die! Die!
- Loraxx – Selfs

==== 2006 ====
- This Moment in Black History – It Takes a Nation of Assholes to Hold Us Back
- Jinx Titanic – Stuporstardom!
- The Cape May – Glass Mountain Roads
- Cougars – Pillow Talk
- Sparrklejet – Beyond the Beyond
- Two Minute Warning – Short Stories On Super-Eight
- Mise en Place – Innit
- Mono – You Are There
- New Grenada – Modern Problems
- Zao – The Fear Is What Keeps Us Here
- Joanna Newsom – Ys
- 12Twelve – L'Univers
- Nina Nastasia – On Leaving
- The Time Of The Assassins – Awake In Slumberland
- The Hidden – Winged Wolves
- Made Out of Babies – Coward
- Marty Casey and Lovehammers – Marty Casey and Lovehammers
- Cheap Trick – Rockford
- Born Again Floozies – 7 Deadly Sinners
- Living Things – "Bom Bom Bom"
- Chevreuil – (((Capoëira)))
- Chevreuil – Science
- The Sadies – Live Vol.1
- Gasoline Heart – You Know Who You Are
- Phillip Roebuck – Fever Pitch
- Uzeda – Stella
- Childproof – Original Copy

==== 2007 ====
- Second Echo
- The Stooges – The Weirdness
- Fun – Zu-Pa!
- Orchid Trip – Orchid Trip
- Alamos – Captain Indifferent says, "Whatever"
- Chingalera – In the Shadow of the Black Palm Tree
- Moutheater – Lot Lizard
- stuffy/the fuses – Angels Are Ace
- Hot Little Rocket – How to Lose Everything
- Weedeater – God Luck and Good Speed
- A Whisper In The Noise – Dry Land
- Nina Nastasia & Jim White – You Follow Me
- The Conformists – Three Hundred
- Om – Pilgrimage
- Valina – a tempo! a tempo!
- Scout Niblett – This Fool Can Die Now
- The Judas Goats – Cold Creases E.P.
- The Forms – st
- Stinking Lizaveta – Scream of the Iron Iconoclast
- Phonovectra – Too Young To Die
- Neurosis – Given to the Rising
- Bear Claw – Slow Speed: Deep Owls
- Wonderful Smith - Hello, It's Wonderful

==== 2008 ====
- Aloke – I Moved Here to Live
- Esquimaux – Tiger
- The Breeders – Mountain Battles
- My Disco – Paradise
- Over Vert – Gagging and Swallowing
- Popular Workshop – We're Alive And We're Not Alone
- Scott Weiland – "Happy" in Galoshes
- The Pale Figures – Memphis and Chicago
- Nations Of Fire – If It Swings, We've Got It!
- Room 101 – The Pitch
- Trash Talk – Trash Talk
- ALiX – Good 1
- The Wedding Present – El Rey
- Haymarket Riot – Endless Bummer
- 54-71 – I'm not fine thank you, and you?
- Three second kiss – Long Distance Runner
- Vitamin X – Full Scale Assault
- Ranheim – I Don't Like The Smiths EP
- Ranheim – Norwegian Wood
- The Splints – Love Letters and Broken Bones
- Precore – Sick
- Born Again Floozies – street music, 13 Rebellions and a Song of Consolation
- The New Year - The New Year

==== 2009 ====
- The Provocative Whites – EVOLYM
- Mono – Hymn to the Immortal Wind
- Manic Street Preachers – Journal for Plague Lovers
- Umphrey's McGee – Mantis
- Stella Peel – Stella Peel
- Jarvis Cocker – Further Complications
- Minto – Lay It On Me
- Delby L – Nine Skies
- The Thing – Bag It!
- PRE – Hope Freaks
- Magnolia Electric Co. – Josephine
- Drug Mountain – Drug Mountain
- Motorpsycho – Child of the Future
- Berri Txarrak – Payola
- Om – God Is Good
- Pixies – Minotaur
- Tunica Dartos – Sound Buffet (released January 2011)
- Årabrot – The Brother Seed
- Kingskin – Slug
- Leila Adu – Dark Joan
- The Marder – Men's Ruin EP
- Sparklehorse – Bird Machine
- Anni Rossi — Rockwell

=== 2010s ===
==== 2010 ====
- Brent Newman & The Broken Arrows – Before The Revolution
- Scout Niblett – The Calcination of Scout Niblett
- Bella Clava – The Craic
- The Ex – Catch My Shoe
- Nina Nastasia – Outlaster
- The Bats Pajamas – The Bats Pajamas
- Grandfather – Why I'd Try
- My Disco – Little Joy
- The Conformists – None Hundred
- Avitia – Windowsmashers and Safecrackers
- Ferocious Fucking Teeth – Ferocious Fucking Teeth
- Tubelord – Tezcatlipōca
- Old Man Lady Luck

==== 2011 ====
- The Gary – El Camino
- Let's Wrestle – Nursing Home
- Senium – Such Progress
- Azimyth – Azimyth
- Bear Claw – Refuse This Gift
- The Crooked Fiddle Band – Overgrown Tales
- Sleepwalks – The Milk Has Gone Sour (recording engineer, credited as Stevo)
- Joan of Arc – Life Like
- Monotonix – Not Yet
- Weedeater – Jason...The Dragon
- Andy Powder – Friendlier
- 24 Grana – “La stessa barca”

==== 2012 ====
- We Are Knuckle Dragger – Tit for Tat
- Cloud Nothings – Attack on Memory
- China – Pussy LP
- The Cribs – In The Belly of the Brazen Bull
- Screaming Females – Ugly
- Ghosts in the Valley – Clockpunchers (released May 2012)
- Younger – TBA
- A Banquet – Breath
- Teeth – The Strain
- Cold Fur – Altamont Every Night
- Colin Tyler – Live From Studio A
- Bonnie 'Prince' Billy – Now Here's My Plan EP
- Ominous Black – Self-titled EP
- Neurosis – Honor Found in Decay
- Vitamin X – About To Crack
- Hugh Cornwell – Totem And Taboo
- Thinning the Herd – Freedom From the Known
- Alexi Martov – Scent of a Wolf
- Joe 4 – Njegov Sin

==== 2013 ====
- Man or Astro-man? – Defcon 5 4 3 2 1
- Goddard – 10-inch (with Giraffes? Giraffes!)
- Candelilla – Heart Mutter
- The Crooked Fiddle Band – Moving Pieces Of The Sea
- Saything – Nonsense
- The Seething Coast – Olympia
- STNNNG – Empire Inward
- Robert Rolfe Feddersen – American Loser
- The New Trust – Keep Dreaming
- Barb Wire Dolls – Slit
- P.K.14 – 1984
- Thom Bowden - Searching The Brittle Light

==== 2014 ====
- Brent Newman & The Broken Arrows – Hot Blood
- Blind Butcher – Albino
- D3AD BY MONDAY – Memento Mori
- Captain Blood – Captain Blood
- Esben and the Witch – A New Nature
- Foxy Shazam – Gonzo
- Screaming Females – Live at the Hideout
- Valina – Container

==== 2015 ====
- Conduct – Fear and Desire
- Raketkanon – RKTKN#2
- KEN Mode – Success
- WOMPS – Live a Little Less/Dreams on Demand
- Steve Taylor and the Danielson Foil – Wow to the Deadness
- Weedeater – Goliathan
- Screaming Females – Rose Mountain
- Subsurfer – La La La
- Hex Horizontal– Electric Fence
- Yonatan Gat – Physical Copy
- Sterling Witt - Satyagraha

==== 2016 ====
- Alpha Strategy – Drink the Brine, Get Scarce
- Womps – Our fertile forever
- Cocaine Piss – Sex Weirdos 7-inch
- Cocaine Piss – The Dancer
- Valina – In Position
- Peter Squires – When I Couldn't Move
- Robbie Fulks – Upland Stories
- Neurosis – Fires Within Fires
- The Conformists – Divorce
- Karabas Barabas – Return of the Sexy Demon
- Kapitan Korsakov – Physical Violence is the Least of My Priorities
- Vomitface – Hooray for Me
- Descartes a Kant – Victims of Love Propaganda
- Malojian – This Is Nowhere
- Mono – Requiem For Hell
- Dazzling Killmen – Face of Collapse: Special Edition (25th Anniversary reissue)
- Chris Cobilis (performed by Spektral Quartet and Kenneth Goldsmith) – This Is You
- Sex Snobs – Emotional Stuffing
- KEN Mode – Nerve EP (tracks 1–4)
- Oddity - “Settle Down”

==== 2017 ====
- Ty Segall – Ty Segall
- Meat Wave – The Incessant
- The Oxford Coma – Everything Out of Tune
- STNNNG – Veterans of Pleasure
- The Cribs -24–7 Rock Star Shit
- Descartes a Kant– Victims Of Love Propaganda
- METZ – Strange Peace
- Andy Pratt — Horizon Disrupted
- Ben Frost — The Centre Cannot Hold
- The Wedding Present – George Best (20th anniversary re-recording. Recorded in 2007 but not released until 2017)
- The New Year - Snow
- Super Static Fever - Silent Dynamic Torture (recorded in the 90's, remastered by Albini)

==== 2018 ====
- The Breeders – All Nerve
- Spare Snare – Sounds Recorded by Steve Albini
- Signal the Launch – Dance Like a Vampire
- Elias Black – Reclamation
- GEZAN — Silence Will Speak
- Super Unison – Stella
- Alpha Strategy – The Gurgler
- Meat Wave – The Incessant
- Andy Pratt – Further Disruption (EP)
- Control Group – It's the year 2000!

==== 2019 ====
- Fastriser – Type III
- Mono – Nowhere Now Here
- Sunn O))) – Life Metal
- Sunn O))) – Pyroclasts
- Triliteral – Flying Snake's Claw
- Frank Iero and the Future Violents – Barriers
- Doblecapa – La Felpa
- Uzeda – Quocumque jeceris stabit
- Décibelles – Rock Français
- Asylums – Genetic Cabaret
- Flat Worms – Antarctica
- DBOY – New Records in Human Power
- Ty Segall & Freedom Band – Deforming Lobes
- Black Orchids – Sakura Sorrow
- Austero – Austero
- Local H – Lifers (one song only)
- Down The Lees – Bury The Sun
- Psihomodo Pop - Digitalno Nebo (engineer on tracks 10 and 12)

=== 2020s ===
==== 2020 ====
Artist	Release	Format	Label	Credit
Medusa	In Bed with Medusa			
Glasgow	Glasgow EP			
Karabas Barabas	Degenerate National Anthem	Vinyl CD Cassette	Library Ghost Records	Recording & Mix Engineer
dave the band	Slob Stories			
Fuzz	III			
Laura Jane Grace	Stay Alive			
Living Things	Shapeshifter			
Asylums	Genetic Cabaret			
Lil BUB	Lil BUB: The Band			
Chief Tail	Chief Tail			
Brainiac	Transmissions After Zero	DVD		Featured
Fotocrime	South of Heaven			Recording engineer
Local H	LIFERS			
Metz	"Acid" / "Slow Delay"			
Former Utopia	Magnetar			
Failure	1992-1996			Recording engineer
Pylon	Pylon Box			
Get Smart!	Oh Yeah No			

==== 2021 ====
Artist	Release	Format	Label	Credit
Racing The Sun	Epidemic of Love			
Mono	Pilgrimage of the soul			
Ativin	Austere			
Prince of Lilies	Vent			

==== 2022 ====
Artist	Release	Format	Label	Credit
CREEPSCIENCE	Shift the Paradigm			
Cat's Eye	Night and Soul		8 Hours Records	
Nina Nastasia	Riderless Horse			
Corduroy Cat	10% Hopeful			
Black Midi	live at electric audio			Recording engineer
Mikey Erg	Love at Leeds			
Meet Cute	"Party Mind"			

==== 2023 ====
Artist	Release	Format	Label	Credit
Spare Snare	The Brutal			
Liturgy	93696			
No Men	Fear This			
MX-80 Sound	Better Than Life	CD, LP	Klanggalerie	Mixer
Snailbones	"Erroneous Harmonious"			
Laurel Canyon	Laurel Canyon			
Ativin	Austere			
Code Orange	The Above			
CRYAMY	World			

==== 2024 ====
Artist	Release	Format	Label	Credit
Cheer-Accident	Vacate	CD, digital	Cuneiform	Recording engineer
Fire!	Testament	CD, LP, digital	Rune Grammofon	Recording engineer, mixing
Facs	"North American Endless"	7", digital	Sub Pop	Engineer
The Conformists	Midwestless	CDr, LP, digital	Computer Students	Recording engineer
Didjits	Strictly Dynamite: The Best of The Didjits	LP, digital	Touch and Go	Engineer, producer (tracks 10, 11, 13, 14, 18, and 33)
Mono	Oath	CD, LP, digital	Pelagic/Temporary Residence	Recording engineer, mixing, producer
The Ergs!	Dorkrockcorkrod (20th Anniversary Steve Albini Remix)	LP, cassette	Don Giovanni	Mixing
Chin Music	Chin Music	7"	Nitty Kitty	Guitar, artwork
Dream Skills, GW Sok	As We Speak	LP	Sleeping Giant Glossolalia	Recording engineer
DJ Dust	Melting Pot: Songs from the Furnace	CDr	Misadventures in Media	Mixer (track 3)
...Of Death	Discography	Cassette	R.I.P. In Peace Records	Recording engineer
Slowly	"Prayer to God"	Digital	Lossleader Records	Writer
Basically Nancy	Wounds	LP	Graveface Records	Recording engineer, mixer
Mono	The Unforgettable EP	7"	Temporary Residence Limited	Recording engineer, mixer, producer
The Effigies	Est. 1980 Chicago	LP	BFD	Transferring
Prince Of Lilies	Hurst			
Redshift Headlights	If You Are Around Still			
Hide and Shine	Soft Machines	DBL-LP		Mixing
Slint	Tweez (35th Anniversary Edition)	LP	Touch and Go	Engineer, liner notes
Montage Montage	See Them While They're Here	digital	self-released	Recording engineer
Kim Deal	Nobody Loves You More	CD, LP, digital	4AD	Engineer

==== 2025 ====
Artist	Release	Format	Label	Credit
FACS	Wish Defense			Recording engineer
Karabas Barabas	99 Cent Store	CD, LP, digital	Library Ghost Records	Recording engineer, mixing

==== 2026 ====
Artist	Release	Format	Label	Credit
Toadies	The Charmer	CD, LP, digital	Spaceflight Records	Recording engineer
Adam Wiltzie & Jóhann Jóhannsson	Friendship Survival Guide	CD, LP, digital	Deutsche Grammophon	Recording engineer

== Spoken word ==
- "Spoken Word Thing" - Sub Pop 100 (Sub Pop, 1986) – compilation by various artists
