= Toku =

Toku may refer to:

== People ==
Name

- Toku (musician) (born 1973), Japanese jazz musician
- Toku Hime (1565–1615), Japanese princess during the Sengoku and Edo periods
- Toku Nishio (西尾 徳; 1939–2005), Japanese actor and voice actor
- Shō Toku (尚 徳; 1441–1469), was the son of Shō Taikyū and last king of the First Shō Dynasty

Surname

- Emmanuel Toku (born 2000), Ghanaian professional footballer
- Indiya Toku (born 1994), Indian cricketer
- Sanpo Toku (徳 三宝; 1887–1945), Japanese judoka

== Music ==
- 7-Toku, is the second album by Space Streakings
- Toku Do, is an album by guitarist Larry Coryell
- Tōku Made, is the eighth single by Do As Infinity

== Place ==
- Toku, Estonia, a village in Antsla Parish, Võru County, Estonia
- Tokū, Tonga, an uninhabited volcanic island in Tonga

== Other ==
- Toku (TV network), an American anime television network
- TokuDB, is an open-source, high-performance storage engine
- Tokusatsu, a genre of Japanese live action film or television series featuring kaiju, superheroes or mecha
- Toku Daihatsu-class landing craft, was a type of landing craft
