= Me or You? =

Song by Killing Joke

Single by Killing Joke
- B-side: "Wilful Days"
- Released: 7 October 1983
- Genre: Post-punk
- Length: 11:38
- Label: E.G. Records
- Songwriters: Jaz Coleman; Kevin "Geordie" Walker; Paul Raven; Paul Ferguson
- Producers: Killing Joke; John Porter

Killing Joke singles chronology
"Let's All Go (to the Fire Dances)" (1983)	"Me or You?" (1983)	"Eighties" (1984)

12" Release
- Me or You? Side A Inner Sleeve

"Me or You?" is a single by Killing Joke. It was released by E.G. Records in October 1983 as a 12", 7", and limited double vinyl 7" single, including the B-side "Wilful Days". The single reached No. 57 in the UK Singles Chart that month. Both "Me or You?" and "Wilful Days" were later included on the 2008 reissue of Fire Dances.

== Track listings ==
For the 12" release, the B-side "Wilful Days" was joined by "Feast of Blaze" from the album Fire Dances. The limited double vinyl 7" single featured "Wilful Days" as a C-side with a blank D-side.

=== 7" vinyl single ===
==== Side A ====
1. "Me or You?" – 03:02

==== Side B ====
1. "Wilful Days" – 05:01

=== 7" double vinyl single ===
==== Side A ====
1. "Me or You?" – 03:02

==== Side B ====
1. "Feast of Blaze" – 03:35

==== Side C ====
1. "Wilful Days" – 05:01

==== Side D ====
- blank

=== 12" vinyl single ===
==== Side A ====
1. "Me or You?" – 03:02

==== Side B ====
1. "Feast of Blaze" – 03:35
2. "Wilful Days" – 05:01

== Charts ==
Year	Chart	Peak Position
1983	UK Singles Chart	57
