= Hatsukoi (Space Streakings album) =

Hatsu-Koi

Studio album by Space Streakings
- Released: 1993
- Genre: Noise rock
- Length: 38:51
- Label: NUX
- Producer: KK Null, Space Streakings

Space Streakings chronology
Hatsu-Koi (1993)	7-Toku (1994)

Professional ratings
Review scores
Source	Rating
Allmusic	3/5 stars

Hatsu-Koi is the debut album from Space Streakings, released in 1993 through NUX Organization.

== Track listing ==
All tracks are written by Space Streakings

No.	Title	Length
1.	"夢の島" ("Yume No Shima")	2:02
2.	"怪奇サスペンスくも男" ("Kaiki Suspense Kumo Otoko")	4:03
3.	"ブレインデッド" ("Brain Dead")	3:11
4.	"マジック・ドラゴン" ("Magic Dragon")	4:53
5.	"三途の河" ("Sanzu No Kawa")	4:43
6.	"ヒロポン・グー" ("Hiropon Goo!!")	1:32
7.	"愛と憎しみの季節" ("Ai to Nikushimi No Kisetsu")	3:56
8.	"スポーツちょっとだけョ" ("Sports Chiyotto Dakeyo")	3:29
9.	"メガトン・ベイビー・ボム" ("Megaton Baby Bomb")	5:25
10.	"北極圏の青い空" ("Hottkyokuken No Aoisora")	2:06
11.	"脳天直下ハイパーラヴ" ("Nohten Chiyyoka Hyper Love")	3:31

== Personnel ==
Adapted from 7-Toku liner notes.

Space Streakings

- Captain Insect – bass guitar, vocals, programming
- Kame Bazooka – alto saxophone, vocals, horns, illustrations
- Karate Condor – turntables, vocals
- Screaming Stomach – guitar, vocals, trumpet, kazoo

Production

- KK Null – production
- Space Streakings – production

== Release history ==
Region	Date	Label	Format	Catalog
Japan	1993	NUX	CD	NUX-D5
