= Out of Place =

2009 American documentary film

Out of Place is a surfing documentary directed by Scott Ditzenberger and Darrin McDonald that follows the lives of several lake surfers in Cleveland, Ohio. While Lake Erie does not offer the quality of waves they would prefer, business commitments, family, and friends keep them from moving. As the best waves occur in the winter, the surfers often experience freezing conditions including during a snowbound Great Lakes Eastern Surfing Association competition featured in the film.

== Production ==
Production for the film began in the fall of 2001 and wrapped in the summer of 2009. Unlike many surf genre films, Out Of Place was entirely independently financed and produced. The project began with an idea Scott Ditzenberger had to film his friends surfing in Lake Erie. It was not until he discussed the subject with Darrin McDonald, a PBS producer, and Tom Heinrich that Out Of Place became a serious film project. In 2007, Kurt Vincent began editing the film. Vincent happened to be sharing a house with Robby Staebler of The Barn Owls, leading to The Barn Owls involvement in the film's soundtrack.

== Release ==
Out of Place opened at the New York Surf Film Festival in September 2009 where it won the Viewers’ Choice Award for Best Feature. It has also screened at the 25th Santa Barbara International Film Festival, the Cleveland International Film Festival, the 2010 Taranaki Surf Film Festival in New Zealand and the 2010 Lighthouse International Film Festival in Long Beach Island, New Jersey. In July 2010, the film screened in Hawaii for the first time at the Doris Duke Theatre at the Honolulu Academy of Art as part of its 2010 surf film festival. It has also been screened at an April 2010 benefit for the Surfrider Foundation in New York City.

== Soundtrack ==
The movie features songs from several artists including The Barn Owls, Colin Wilson, The Dreadful Yawns, Gabe Schray, Great Lake Swimmers, Neil Turk, The All Golden, Celebrity Pilots and This Moment in Black History. The Barn Owls, a psychedelic rock duo from Columbus, Ohio, featuring Robby and Jason Staebler, contributed original music for the film's soundtrack.

The soundtrack was released in March 2010 on Actual Archives, a record label based in Akron, Ohio. The soundtrack artwork was designed by Cleveland-based graphic designer Trevor Marzella.

== Cast ==
In alphabetical order:

- Gennaro Barilaro
- How Beates
- Eric Becker
- Bob a.k.a. Freakface
- Andrew Carlson
- Austin Dalpe
- Stevie Dalpe
- Dirty Dex
- Kirk Dorony
- Paul Doughty
- Edmund
- Sean "Ripper" Flanagan
- Chris Gibbons
- Luke Gibbons
- Rick Guest
- Ben Haehn
- Nathan Hammond
- Suzie "Suzymyster" Hancock
- Kevin Hegedus
- Jay Hill
- David Hubbard
- Jason's friend Michael
- Ralph Joslin
- Mike Junewicz
- Paul Kovalcik
- Ali Kurzeja
- Vince Labbe
- Gary "Frozenbolt" Lagore
- Jason Lance
- Joel Lehman
- Chris Lipsey
- Neal Luoma a.k.a. Oscar
- Jimmy "the Kid" Manson
- Chris McIntosh
- Mike Miller
- Jen Moldovan
- Johnny "Shred" Moore
- Tim Moran
- James "Kimo" Moya
- Kyle Nesbit
- M. Yvette "Evie" Obias
- Guillermo Pardo
- Vince Piscitello
- Mark Renko
- Sean Rooney
- Jack Ryncarz
- Johnny Santosuooso
- Magilla Schaus
- Sean with the Laptop
- Rich Stack
- Kevin "Snake" Stoeveken
- Bryan "Indysfr" Wedmore
- Bill Weeber
- Amanda Weigand
- Kevin Weigand
- Dr. Joe Wellington
- Hobie Williams
- Todd "the Rod" Williams
- Jennifer Wooley
- Marikate Workman
- J.A. Yanak

== See also ==
- Unsalted: A Great Lakes Experience, a 2005 documentary film also about lake surfing
