= Let's All Go (to the Fire Dances) =

Song by Killing Joke

Single by Killing Joke

from the album Fire Dances
- A-side: "Let's All Go (to the Fire Dances)"
- B-side: "Dominator"
- Released: 17 June 1983
- Genre: Post-punk, gothic rock
- Length: 13:49
- Label: E.G. Records
- Songwriter(s): Jaz Coleman; Kevin "Geordie" Walker; Paul Raven; Paul Ferguson
- Producer(s): Killing Joke; John Porter

Killing Joke singles chronology
| "Birds of a Feather" (1982) | "Let's All Go (to the Fire Dances)" (1983) | "Me or You?" (1983) |

"Let's All Go (to the Fire Dances)" is a song by English post-punk band Killing Joke, released as the sole single from their 1983 studio album Fire Dances, on 12" and 7" vinyl by E.G. Records in June 1983. The single reached number 51 in the UK Singles Chart and was the band's first single with a music video.

== Track listings ==
The B-side for the 7" release was the track "Dominator", also from the album Fire Dances. The version of this track featured on the 12" release was a longer alternative mix, titled "Dominator (Version)".

The A-side for the 12" single also included a live recording of "The Fall of Because". The alternative mix of "Dominator" was later included on the 2008 reissue of Fire Dances.

7" vinyl single

Side A

1. "Let's All Go (to the Fire Dances)" – 03:20

Side B

1. "Dominator" – 05:05

12" vinyl single

Side A

1. "Let's All Go (to the Fire Dances)" – 03:23
2. "The Fall of Because (Live)" – 04:54

Side B

1. "Dominator (Version)" – 05:32

== Charts ==
| Chart (1983) | Peak position |
|---|---|
| UK Singles (OCC) | 51 |
