= Nursing Home (album) =

Studio album by Let's Wrestle
- Released: May 17, 2011
- Recorded: Electrical Audio, Chicago
- Genre: Indie rock
- Length: 30:40
- Label: Merge Records, Full Time Hobby
- Producer: Steve Albini

Let's Wrestle chronology
In the Court of the Wrestling Let's (2009)	Nursing Home (2011)	Let's Wrestle (2014)

Nursing Home is the second album by indie rock band Let's Wrestle. It was released on May 16, 2011 on Full Time Hobby, and the following day on Merge Records. It was recorded at Electrical Audio in Chicago and was produced by Steve Albini.

The album was produced under the working title Trout Mask Wrestlica, after Captain Beefheart's 1969 album Trout Mask Replica, which would have continued the trend of naming their albums after classic albums which was explored by their first album, In the Court of the Wrestling Let's, but as frontman Wesley Patrick Gonzalez said in 2011, "we didn’t want to have to carry on the whole parody album names forever. I don’t want us to be looked at in the way a band like Half Man Half Biscuit are, a Joke Band."

== Lyrics ==
The album's lyrics contain humor and wit, focusing on topics such as playing computer games and hanging out with friends. The lyrics are also more self-deprecating and apathetic than those of Let's Wrestle's previous songs.

== Critical reception ==
Professional ratings
Aggregate scores
Source	Rating
Metacritic	74/100
Review scores
Source	Rating
AllMusic	4/5 stars
The A.V. Club	B–
Boston Phoenix	3/4 stars
Drowned in Sound	8/10
MSN Music (Expert Witness)	A–
MusicOMH	4/5 stars
NME	7/10
Pitchfork	6.7/10
PopMatters	6/10

The album received generally favorable reviews from critics. In a mixed review, Daniel Tebo wrote, "There’s still a lot of fun to be had at this Nursing Home but it’s pretty clear that the party is winding down." In a more positive review, Robert Christgau wrote that in addition to maturing, the members of Let's Wrestle "do what all maturing s.-p.o.w.t.a. [slacker-punks or whatever they are] wish they could do – write better songs." Drowned in Sound's Michael Wheeler awarded the album a score of 8/10 and wrote that the song "For My Mother" was "probably the best and further proof of Let’s Wrestle’s idiot-savant genius."

Many reviewers perceived Nursing Home as reflecting a more mature band than did the band's debut, In the Court of the Wrestling Let's. According to Daniel Tebo, Nursing Home is "a few shades darker than expected." David Sheppard also praised Nursing Home as an improvement over their debut, writing that Nursing Home was "understandably crunchier than its predecessor," and that "this time the melodies are more consistently nagging and Gonzalez’s lyrics broader in scope." Michael Wheeler wrote that Nursing Home was "if not exactly refined, than certainly a little tighter and more focused in its abandon" than In the Court of the Wrestling Let's, and also described it as more coherent and unified.

== Track listing ==
1. In Dreams (Part 2)
2. If I Keep on Loving You
3. In the Suburbs
4. Bad Mamories
5. Dear John
6. For My Mother
7. I'm So Lazy
8. There's a Rockstar in My Room
9. I Forgot
10. I Am Useful
11. I Will Not Give In
12. Getting Rest

== Personnel ==
- Steve Albini—Engineer
- Darkus Bishop—Drums, Group Member
- Wesley Patrick Gonzalez—Artwork, Composer, Group Member, Guitar, Vocals
- Adam Kerle—Mastering
- Mike Lightning—Bass, Group Member, Keyboards, Vocals
- Merida Richards—Art Supervisor
