= Fire Dances =

1983 studio album by Killing Joke

Studio album by Killing Joke
- Released: 15 July 1983
- Recorded: February–March 1983
- Studio: Basing Street, London
- Genre: Post-punk; gothic rock
- Length: 39:25
- Label: E.G., Polydor
- Producer: Killing Joke, John Porter

Killing Joke chronology
Revelations (1982)	Fire Dances (1983)	Night Time (1985)

Singles from Fire Dances
- 1. "Let's All Go (to the Fire Dances)" Released: 17 June 1983

Fire Dances is the fourth studio album by English post-punk band Killing Joke, released on 15 July 1983 by E.G. via Polydor Records. It was the band's first album to feature new bass player Paul Raven, recorded at Basing Street Studios in London between February and March 1983. According to Paul Ferguson the band's drug use contributed to the original mix of the album being "tinny".

== Release ==
Fire Dances was released in July 1983 by E.G. Records. It entered number 29 in the UK Albums Chart, on 23 July 1983.

The album was remastered and reissued in 2008, with eight bonus tracks: the non-album single "Me or You?", an alternate version of "Dominator" (B-side to "Let's All Go (to the Fire Dances)"), an unreleased early version of "The Gathering" and four tracks from a John Peel session from 1983.

== Reception ==
Professional ratings
Review scores
Source	Rating
AllMusic	3.5/5 stars
The Encyclopedia of Popular Music	4/5 stars
MusicHound Rock	2.5/5 stars
Select	2/5 stars
PopMatters	8/10
Sounds	1.5/5 stars

Fire Dances was generally well received by music critics. NME called it "their best [album] yet, and also likely to be their biggest." PopMatters and Trouser Press both qualified the album as "superb", with the latter describing the album's mood as "brighter" and "more joyous" than previous records.

== Track listing ==
All tracks are written by Killing Joke (Jaz Coleman, Paul Ferguson, Paul Raven and Geordie Walker).

Side A
No.	Title	Length
1.	"The Gathering"	3:11
2.	"Fun and Games"	4:05
3.	"Rejuvenation"	4:01
4.	"Frenzy"	3:46
5.	"Harlequin"	3:57

Side B
No.	Title	Length
1.	"Feast of Blaze"	3:35
2.	"Song and Dance"	5:13
3.	"Dominator"	4:28
4.	"Let's All Go (to the Fire Dances)"	3:19
5.	"Lust Almighty"	3:50

2008 CD reissue bonus tracks
No.	Title	Length
11.	"Me or You?"	3:11
12.	"Wilful Days"	5:01
13.	"Dominator" (Alternate Version)	5:33
14.	"The Gathering" (Original Version)	3:25
15.	"Dominator" (John Peel Session, 12/07/83)	5:40
16.	"Frenzy" (John Peel Session, 12/07/83)	3:40
17.	"Wilful Days" (John Peel Session, 12/07/83)	6:00
18.	"Harlequin" (John Peel Session, 12/07/83)	3:56

== Personnel ==
Killing Joke

- Jaz Coleman – vocals, synthesizer, production
- Kevin "Geordie" Walker – guitar, production
- Paul Raven – bass guitar, production
- Paul Ferguson – drums, vocals, production

Technical

- John Porter – co-producer on "Let's All Go (to the Fire Dances)", "Me or You" and "Wilful Days"
- Nigel Mills – recording engineer, mixing

== Charts ==
Year	Chart	Peak position
1983	UK Albums Chart	29
