= German Water =

Studio album by Ativin
- Released: 4 May 1999
- Genre: Instrumental rock
- Length: 38:20
- Label: Secretly Canadian

Ativin chronology
Pills Versus Planes (1996)	German Water (1999)	Summing the Approach (1999)

Professional ratings
Review scores
Source	Rating
AllMusic	4.5/5 stars

German Water is an album by the Bloomington, Indiana-based instrumental rock band Ativin, released in 1999.

== Critical reception ==
Pitchfork deemed the album "brooding, introspective and powerful, even during the whisper-quiet moments."

== Track listing ==
1. "Thirteen Ovens" – 4:00
2. "Fortune Telling Fish" – 3:25
3. "Stations" – 6:28
4. "Back at the Lab" – 4:18
5. "Church of Astronauts" – 4:00
6. "Modern Gang Reader" – 4:17
7. "Meeting with the Center of the Earth" – 11:52
