= New Grenada (band) =

American indie rock band

- Origin: Royal Oak, Michigan, USA
- Genres: Indie rock
- Years active: 2001-2010
- Labels: Plumline; Asaurus; Contraphonic; Jack Holmes Recording Co. Melodic Virtue; Wax Detroit
- Members: John Nelson; Dave Melkonian; Monday Busque
- Past members: Nicole Allie; Shawn Knight; Andy Roy; Scott Behnan; Mike Chavarria; Nick Pallos
- Website: www.newgrenada.com

New Grenada was an American indie rock band from Royal Oak, Michigan. The band was active from 2001- 2010.

New Grenada's style of indie rock music is both melodic and abrasive and has been compared to Neil Young, punk icons the Buzzcocks and lo-fi pioneers Sebadoh. Mainstays in the underground Detroit rock scene, New Grenada developed a cult following and have 4 albums, several EPs, singles and compilation tracks to their credit.

== Biography ==
The band was started by songwriter John Nelson and girlfriend Nicole Allie, along with Mike Chavarria and Nicholas Pallos. The band formed after the breakup of Nelson's previous band, Cloud Car. Cloud Car, founded by Nelson at the age of 19, were one of the few indie rock groups to find acceptance in the Detroit garage rock scene of the late 1990s. Bands like the Dirtbombs, Outrageous Cherry, The Go, The Sights and the White Stripes thrived during this important time in Detroit music history. Cloud Car's original lineup featured drummer Jim Edmunds, eventually joining Dean Fertita's (Queens of the Stone Age, The Dead Weather) retro pop group The Waxwings.

New Grenada debuted their split 7-inch with Detroit punk band the Trembling (featuring Busque) in fall of 2001. Their first album, The Open Heart, was released in 2002 and featured tracks produced by Detroit recording engineer Tim Pak and solo artist Brendan Benson, also of The Raconteurs. The album featured a diverse mixture of scrappy up-tempo rock songs and quirky keyboard-driven pop. The album was warmly received by critics and found success on college radio stations throughout the U.S. The band toured and played shows with the likes of Imperial Teen, Rainer Maria, Aloha, Joel Plaskett and many others.

The band went through several lineup changes before their next release, the Hot War EP. Chavarria left the group to concentrate on producing hip hop artists. Shawn Knight, who contributed to the Open Heart recordings, became a full-time member. Pallos moved to Los Angeles to concentrate on film making, and a revolving cast of drummers played in the band, most notably Scott Behnan and Andy Roy.

From 2002 to 2005 New Grenada played hundreds of shows, released the home-recorded full length Parting Shots, an EP of punk covers called the Iron Triangle, and the experimental More Nature EP. The band was also featured on several compilations, including a high-profile Sonic Youth Tribute called Kill Yr Idols (Narnack Records). Legendary d.j. John Peel became a New Grenada fan, playing their music on his radio show. After an ill-fated show opening for Detroit band Thunderbirds Are Now!, which featured onstage bickering and instruments being destroyed, Andy Roy left the band. He was soon replaced by Dave Melkonian of Ten Words for Snow.

Nelson and Allie married in 2005. In January 2006, the band recorded the album Modern Problems with Steve Albini at Electrical Audio. This would be the last album to feature Shawn Knight, as he left the band soon thereafter to concentrate on post-punk outfit Child Bite. Modern Problems was well received by critics, but problems with the fledgling record label Contraphonic resulted in weak album sales.

New Grenada continued on as a trio, recording the stripped down Model Citizen EP in 2007. Soon after the release, Nelson and Allie's personal and musical relationship came to an end. Nelson and Melkonian forged ahead, recording the full length Energy Shortage with Mike Bridavsky at Russian Recording in Indiana. The album was released on Nelson's new label, Jack Holmes Recording Company. Monday Busque filled the vacated bass player position in late 2008.

The lineup of Nelson, Melkonian and Busque played limited shows in support of Energy Shortage from 2008 through 2010. On November 20, 2010, they played their final show at P.J.'s Lager House in Detroit. Many former members joined them onstage for different songs, and the band gave out copies of a DVD documenting their nearly 10-year career.

Nelson and Busque went on to play together in the band Destroy This Place.

== Members ==
=== Final lineup ===
- John Nelson – Vocals, Guitars
- Dave Melkonian – Drums
- Monday Busque – Bass

=== Past members ===
- Nicole Allie - Bass, Vocals
- Shawn Knight - Guitars, Keyboards, Vocals
- Andy Roy - Drums
- Scott Behnan - Drums
- Mike Chavarria - Guitars
- Nick Pallos - Drums

== Discography ==
=== LPs ===
- The Open Heart (2002, Plumline)
- Parting Shots (2005, Asaurus)
- Modern Problems (2006, Contraphonic)
- Energy Shortage (2009, Jack Holmes Recording Co.)

=== EPs ===
- Hot War (2003, Plumline)
- Iron Triangle (2003, Boyarm/Plumline)
- More Nature (2005, Melodic Virtue)
- Model Citizen (2008, Asaurus)

=== 7"s ===
- Oberlin/ Shooting Blanks split with The Trembling (2001, Plumline)
- The Day After/ Airwolf (2003, Wax Detroit)
