= Let's Wrestle =

British indie rock band

- Origin: London, England
- Genres: Indie rock, lo-fi
- Years active: 2005-2015
- Labels: Fortuna Pop! Merge Records; Full Time Hobby; Stolen Recordings; Marquis Cha Cha
- Members: Wesley Patrick Gonzalez; Mike Lightning; Darkus Bishop
- Website: http://letswrestleblog.tumblr.com/

Let's Wrestle were an English indie rock band based in London. The band consisted of Wesley Patrick Gonzalez (vocals and guitar), Mike Lightning (bass) and Louis Scase A.K.A Darkus Bishop (drums).

== History ==
Gonzalez, bassist Mike Hankin (also known as Mike Lightning) and drummer Darkus Bishop formed the band in 2005. Their debut 7" single "Song for ABBA Tribute Band" was released only two years later on Marquis Cha Cha Records. According to AllMusic, "it gained them fans in the British music scene, including Art Brut's Eddie Argos, to whom Gonzalez (whose stepfather is musician Pete Astor) was often compared". In 2008 the band signed to Stolen Recordings which released their EP In Loving Memory Of, followed by the full-length In the Court of the Wrestling Let's (2009), recorded in a basement. It was warmly received by critics and earned them comparisons to The Fall and early Wedding Present among others. "They do a first-rate job blending humor, emotion, and energy on In the Court; it's a tricky routine to master but they've done it impressively right out of the gate", AllMusic's Tim Sendra wrote. The second album, Nursing Home, was produced by Steve Albini and released on 1 June 2011 by Merge Records.

In May 2015, after taking a hiatus, the band announced they would be splitting up following a farewell show in London in July.

Wesley Patrick Gonzalez released his first solo single, Come Through and See Me, in November 2015. To promote the new material, Gonzalez appeared the same month on Marc Riley's show on BBC 6 Music, with a backing band consisting of Rose Elinor Dougall and members of Younghusband.

== Musical style ==
The band claims that their musical influences include The Beatles, Neil Young, Pavement, Nirvana, Swell Maps, Pixies, The Raincoats, The Beach Boys, Dinosaur Jr., Buddy Holly, Black Sabbath, Denim, Grandaddy, Hüsker Dü, Wire, Yo La Tengo and Phil Spector. They have also said that they are "ultimately trying to be as raw as possible and they try to write songs that make your soul crumble as well as making you smile, sing along and clap your hands".

== Critical reception ==
The band was described by the NME as "a charming, funny and utterly real trio". Drowned in Sound gave their track "Song For Abba Tribute Record" an 8/10 describing it as a "downtrodden plea from a self-absorbed man with issues" by a "captivating and cutting band" of "ham-fisted gentlemen". The song was also described by the BBC's Collective as "the accidental 4am lovechild of eight bottles of £2.99 Merlot and a wheelbarrow full of Cutter’s Choice". Clash described their album Nursing Home as "brittle scuzzed-up grunge guitars...around a chirpy indie pop recital".

== Discography ==
=== Singles ===
- "Song For Abba Tribute Record" (2007)
- "I Wont Lie To You" (2007)
- "Let's Wrestle/I'm in Fighting Mode" (2008)
- "We Are The Men You'll Grow to Love Soon" (2009)
- "In Dreams Part II" (2011)
- "If I Keep On Loving You" (2011)

=== EPs ===
- In Loving Memory Of... (2008)
- Let's Wrestle Stolen Cover's CDR (2008)

=== Albums ===
- In the Court of the Wrestling Let's (2009)
- Nursing Home (2011)
- Let's Wrestle (2014)
