= Interiors (Ativin album) =

Studio album by Ativin
- Released: January 22, 2002
- Genre: Instrumental rock, ambient
- Length: 37:55
- Label: Secretly Canadian

Ativin chronology
| Summing the Approach (1999) | Interiors (2002) | Night Mute (2004) |

Professional ratings
Review scores
| Source | Rating |
|---|---|
| AllMusic | 4/5 stars |

Interiors is the fourth release and second full-length album from Bloomington, Indiana-based instrumental rock group, Ativin. This album strayed from Ativin's typical instrument line-up of guitar, baritone guitar and drums by adding strings on certain tracks, sometimes very prominently.

== Track listing ==
1. "Interiors" – 3:41
2. "Rub out the Woods" – 3:45
3. "Scissors" – 2:51
4. "Underwater" – 3:29
5. "Two Knives as Crutches" – 1:59
6. "A Single Crease" – 1:46
7. "End of Tape" – 2:48
8. "When the Sky Turns Clear" – 7:20
9. "Near North" – 2:57
10. "Dead Horses" – 4:50
11. "Under Blankets" – 2:30
