= Night Mute =

Studio album by Ativin
- Released: March 16, 2004
- Genre: Instrumental rock
- Length: 31:26
- Label: Secretly Canadian

Ativin chronology
Interiors (2002)	Night Mute (2004)

Professional ratings
Review scores
Source	Rating
AllMusic	3/5 stars
Pitchfork	5.5/10

Night Mute is an album from the Bloomington, Indiana-based instrumental rock band Ativin.

== Critical reception ==
Pitchfork wrote that "when Night Mute strives for mystery, it comes out overwrought; when it goes for dreamy, it comes off sleepy". The Coast wrote that it "has a lot to offer for repeated alone-on-a-Friday-night listens".

== Track listing ==
1. "Night Terror" – 2:20
2. "Saigon Sleeps" – 3:48
3. "Concentrate" – 2:01
4. "Endless" – 1:54
5. "Double Back" – 3:00
6. "The Game" – 3:57
7. "Drink This" – 3:09
8. "Scout" – 3:17
9. "Blood" – 1:36
10. "Sleep Well" – 3:21
