= New York Surf Film Festival =

Film festival in New York

The New York Surf Film Festival is a film festival held in New York City featuring surf films that was held between 2008 and 2013.

== History ==
The New York Surf Film Festival was founded in 2007 by a group of New York surfers.

It held its inaugural event September 26–28, 2008 at Tribeca Cinemas, with 25 films screened from all over the world, including a special 30th Anniversary screening of Warner Brothers' Big Wednesday directed by John Milius and co-written with Denny Aaberg.

The official website shows details of the 2013 festival.

== Submission guidelines ==
The New York Surf Film Competition is open to independently produced feature-length and short films in the surf genre. In order to be considered for the Festival's Film Competition for U.S. and International films, submitted films must have been completed after January 1, 2004. The running time for features must be greater than 30 minutes. Films under 30 minutes in length are eligible for participation in the Short Film Program.

== 2008 program ==
=== Feature films ===
- The Rocks, directed by Mark Temme
- Peel: The Peru Project, directed by Wes Brown
- Musica Surfica, directed by Mick Sowry
- One Winter Story, directed by Elizabeth Pepin
- Sliding Liberia, directed by Britton Cailhouette
- Archy, directed by Bill Ballard
- Out There, a film by the Teton Gravity Project
- Under the Sun, directed by Cyrus Sutton
- Bustin Down the Door, directed by Jeremy Gosch
- Between the Lines, directed by Ty Ponder

=== Short films ===
- Surf Noir, directed by Suyen Mosely
- The Ghosts Are Calling, directed by Andrew Kidman
- June, directed by Spencer Driggs
- Commune, directed by Matt Wesson
- Distant Shores, directed by Matt Katsolis
- Bonzer: The Mothership, directed by the Campbell Brothers
- Evening Africa, directed by Dustin Miller
- Pulp Poo and Perfection, directed by Joshua Berry
- Drawing Lines, directed by Josh Bolton
- Runman's:The Bruce Movie, directed by Ray Kleiman
- Doctor Blood Family Surf, directed by Charles Smith
- Lapsed Catholics, directed by Todd Stewart
- Rip Tide, directed by Dennis Jarvy
- Kooks, directed by Guy Fiorita
- Invasion from Planet C, directed by David Potter

== Winners ==
- Musica Surfica, 2008 Best Feature Award
- Distant Shores, 2008 Best Short Award
- The Rocks, 2008 Viewers Choice Award

== 2009 program ==
The 2009 program included the following feature films:

- Beyond The Dream: Joey Buran Story directed by Matt Katsolis and Nic McLean
- Sea of Darkness directed by Michael Oblowitz
- Power Of Three directed by Ross Cairns
- Last Hope directed by Andrew Kidman
- Hanging Five directed by Christopher Cutri
- Searching for Michael Peterson directed by Australian documentary maker Jolyon Hoff
- Waveriders directed by Joel Conroy
- The Women and The Waves directed by Heather Hudson and Peck Euwer
- The Drifter directed by Taylor Steele
- Out of Place directed by Scott Ditzenberger and Darrin McDonald
- Whitewash directed by Ted Woods
- Clay Marzo:Just Add Water directed by Jamie Tierney
- Surfing 50 States directed by Stefan Hunt and Jonno Durrant
- Mengejar Ombak directed by Dave Arnold & Tyrone Lebon
- Modern Collective directed by Kai Neville
- A Pleasant Surprise directed by Kyle Pahlow
- The Endless Summer directed by Bruce Brown
- Innermost Limits of Pure Fun directed by George Greenough

=== Winners ===
The 2009 winners were:

- Sea of Darkness, 2009 Best Feature Award
- All Points South directed by Joshua Berry, 2009 Best Short Award
- Out of Place, 2009 Viewers Choice Award
