= The Ghost (American band) =

American punk rock band

- Origin: Chicago, Illinois, United States
- Genres: Post-hardcore, indie rock, emo
- Years active: 2001–2004
- Labels: Some Records
- Past members: Brian Moss; Randall Bleichner; Jordan Schalich; Shane Stevens; Paul Lask

The Ghost was a punk rock band from Chicago, with its roots based in the San Francisco Bay Area, California. Members were Brian Moss (Wunder Years, Hanalei, Ole Hole, Great Apes), Randall Bleichner, Jordan Schalich, Shane Stevens, and Paul Lask. From 2001 to 2005 The Ghost toured with bands such as Rival Schools, Thursday, Communique, The Exit, The Cost, Twelve Hour Turn and Small Brown Bike.

Signed to Some Records, The Ghost released two full-length albums. This Is a Hospital, recorded by Steve Albini, was met with favorable reviews. In 2005 This Pen Is a Weapon, recorded and produced by Brian Deck, was met with mixed reviews.

In December 2004 the band broke up, citing "arguments, shifting interests, consistently harsh tours, depression, and conflicting views".

== Discography ==
=== Albums ===
- This Is a Hospital, Some Records, 2002
- This Pen Is a Weapon, Some Records, 2004
- This Is a Hospital re-release, Solidarity Recordings, 2009

400 clear green vinyl / 100 white vinyl / 100 black vinyl (only available at Reunion shows)

=== Splits ===
- The Ghost/Prosperity Wallet Split, Grey Flight Records, 2002

700 Black Vinyl / 300 White Vinyl

=== Compilations ===
- Living Tomorrow Today: A Benefit for Ty Cambra, Asianman Records, 2001

Track 18: Groundswell

- Oil: Chicago Punk Refind, Thick Records, 2002

Track 8: They Came To See You

- Metaphysics For Beginners, Redder Records, 2006

Track 11: Red Slippers, Red Wheels (Midwest Reprise)
