= In the Court of the Wrestling Let's =

Studio album by Let's Wrestle
- Released: June 29, 2009 UK, March 13, 2010 U.S.
- Genre: Indie rock, lo-fi
- Length: 42:49
- Label: Stolen Recordings

Let's Wrestle chronology
In the Court of the Wrestling Let's (2009)	Nursing Home (2011)

Singles from In the Court of the Wrestling Let's
- 1. "We Are The Men You'll Grow to Love Soon" Released: June 21, 2009

Professional ratings
Review scores
Source	Rating
Allmusic	3.5/5 stars
Mojo	4/5 stars
NME	link
Clash	link
Loud and Quiet	link
Record Collector	link
Rock Sound	link
Metro	link
Pitchfork Media	(7.6/10) link

In the Court of the Wrestling Let's is the debut studio album by British indie rock band Let's Wrestle. It was released on June 29, 2009, through Stolen Recordings.

The name of the album was directly inspired by highly influential progressive rock band King Crimson's debut album In the Court of the Crimson King.

== Track listing ==
No.	Title	Length
1.	"My Arms Don't Bend That Way, Damn It!"	2:29
2.	"I'm In Love With Destruction"	3:06
3.	"Tanks"	3:11
4.	"My Eyes Are Bleeding (Interlude)"	1:01
5.	"My Schedule"	3:32
6.	"We Are The Men You'll Grow to Love Soon"	3:02
7.	"In Dreams"	2:41
8.	"Atlantis (Interlude)"	0:50
9.	"Song For Old People"	2:19
10.	"I Won't Lie to You"	2:43
11.	"Diana's Hair"	3:09
12.	"I'm In Fighting Mode"	3:09
13.	"Insects"	3:07
14.	"It's Not Going to Happen"	3:19
15.	"Waltz (Interlude)"	0:27
16.	"In the Court of Wrestling Let's"	4:44

iTunes bonus track
No.	Title	Length
17.	"We Are The Men You'll Grow to Love Soon (M.A.T.H.E.S. Remix)"	2:07
