= This Pen Is a Weapon =

Studio album by The Ghost
- Released: June 1, 2004
- Recorded: July 2003
- Genre: Emo, indie rock
- Length: 38:40
- Label: Some
- Producer: Brian Deck

The Ghost chronology
This Is a Hospital (2002)	This Pen Is a Weapon (2004)

Professional ratings
Review scores
Source	Rating
AllMusic	3/5 stars
Aversion.com	(mixed)
Hectic Eclectic	6.5/10 stars
MSN Music	2.5/5 stars
Punknews.org	3/5 stars

This Pen Is a Weapon is the second album by Chicago-based punk rock band The Ghost. It was released June 1, 2004, on Some Records.

== Track listing ==
All tracks are written by Randy Bleichner/Paul Lask/Brian Moss/Jordan Schalich.

No.	Title	Length
1.	"Broken Ears/Poison Hearts"	4:27
2.	"Exorcism in the Key of a Minor"	4:55
3.	"Mad Max Was an Amateur"	3:17
4.	"Banished and Loving It"	5:00
5.	"...and Now for My Disappearing Act"	4:58
6.	"The Skin We Shed Has Stories to Tell"	2:54
7.	"A Letter from God"	3:41
8.	"Modern Restless"	3:15
9.	"We Shall Persist"	6:10
Total length:		38:40
