= Purplene =

- Origin: Sydney, Australia
- Genres: Indie rock
- Years active: 1996–2005
- Labels: Spunk Records; Hobbledehoy; Quietly Suburban
- Members: Matt Blackman; Adam Jesson; Dave Ledlin; Matt Rossetti
- Past members: Dave Hector

Purplene were an indie rock band whose life began in the industrial Australian city of Newcastle in 1996, culminating in the release the 2004 Purplene LP, then disbanding in the spring of 2005 as one of Australia's most respected rock groups.

== Purplene LP ==
Recorded in Chicago in 2003 with Steve Albini, Purplene earned high critical praise both locally and internationally when the CD was first released via Spunk Records in 2004. The Australian newspaper said of the LP, "Just when I thought Australian guitar music seemed poised to choke on its own cliché-ridden tail, Purplene release their second album," awarding it 4.5 stars out of 5. Belgian magazine Derives made it their feature release, and Rolling Stone called the album, "The work of a band that's in love with the art of crafting the perfect song...truly impressive." In early 2018, it was announced that Hobbledehoy Records would be releasing the album for the first time on gatefold vinyl.

== Discography ==
=== LPs ===
- Ruining It For Everybody LP (2001 Quietly Suburban – engineer Steve Foster)
- Purplene LP (2004 Spunk – engineer Steve Albini)

=== EPs ===
- SMH Days (1998 Threetrack/MGM – engineer Steve Foster)
- All & Sundry (2000 Threetrack – engineer Steve Foster)
- Songs From The Marketplace (2003 Quietly Suburban – engineer Steve Foster)
- Swords Down (2004 Spunk – engineer Steve Albini)

=== DVD & Video ===
- These Things Take Time compilation VHS (All & Sundry – Candle Records 2001)
- Lines From A Poem longboard surfing DVD (Various Purplene + Ukiyo-e tracks – Nathan Oldfield 2003)
- Fuck This, I'm Going to the Annandale compilation DVD (Swords Down live – Reverberation 2005)

=== 7" vinyl ===
- Split with The Rebel Astronauts (2001 Steady Cam)
  – Purplene: Rinse & Stack
  – The Rebel Astronauts: Magnetic

=== Music Videos ===
- Moods of Doubt (demo 1996 – Robin Davies)
- Paris Falling In ('SMH Days', 1998 – Robin Davies)
- Spring On ('SMH Days', 1999 – Joel Noble)
- All & Sundry ('Ruining It For Everybody', 2000 – Joel Noble)
- Last Post ('Ruining It For Everybody', 2001 – Matt & Jonathan Blackman)
- As The Marketplace Orders ('Songs From The Marketplace', 2003 – Jonathan Blackman & Damien Watkins)
- The Battler ('Purplene', 2004 – Matt Richards)
- Love: Western ('Purplene', 2004 – Matt Richards)
- Swords Down ('Purplene', 2005 – Matt & Jonathan Blackman)

== Related projects ==
Blackman, Jesson, and Rossetti went on to form Charge Group, releasing the albums Escaping Mankind (2008) and Charge Group (2012). Charge Group's excellent video for Run garnered significant praise and TV airtime.
Jesson and Rossetti also went on to continue working with Newcastle instrumental rock group The Instant (previously Audiophile).
Blackman, Jesson, and Rossetti have all contributed work with Firekites – a band formed by The Instant's Tim McPhee.
In 2008, Blackman formed rock trio Palace of Fire with Chris Ross and Myles Heskett, both formerly of Wolfmother, then later went on to form electronic duo Ex-Hell with Heskett. In late 2017, Ex-Hell's work first emerged in the music score for CBS comedy No Activity. Blackman has also worked as music composer for TV shows including Review With Myles Barlow, Kitchen Cabinet, and ABC Open. Blackman plays drums in The Tucker B's and was a founding member and multi-instrumentalist in Sydney experimental post-rock group Ukiyo-e (1998–2002).
