= The Crooked Fiddle Band =

Australian music group

- Genres: folk punk
- Years active: 2006 -
- Members: Jess Randall; Gordon Wallace; Mark Stevens; Joe Gould

The Crooked Fiddle Band is an Australian band formed in 2006. The band is made up of Jess Randall (violin), Gordon Wallace (acoustic guitar, bouzouki), Mark Stevens (double bass) and Joe Gould (drums, occasional vocals). Their third album Another Subtle Atom Bomb was nominated for the 2020 ARIA Award for Best World Music Album.

== Members ==
- Jess Randall (violin, nyckelharpa, vocals)
- Gordon Wallace (guitar, bouzouki, cittern, mandolin)
- Mark Stevens (double bass, dulcimer)
- Joe Gould (drums, vocals)

== Discography ==
- The Crooked Fiddle Band EP (2006)
- Rise EP (2008)
- Overgrown Tales (2011)
- Moving Pieces Of The Sea (2013) - Bird's Robe
- Another Subtle Atom Bomb (2019) - Bird's Robe
