= 12Twelve =

Spanish post-rock band

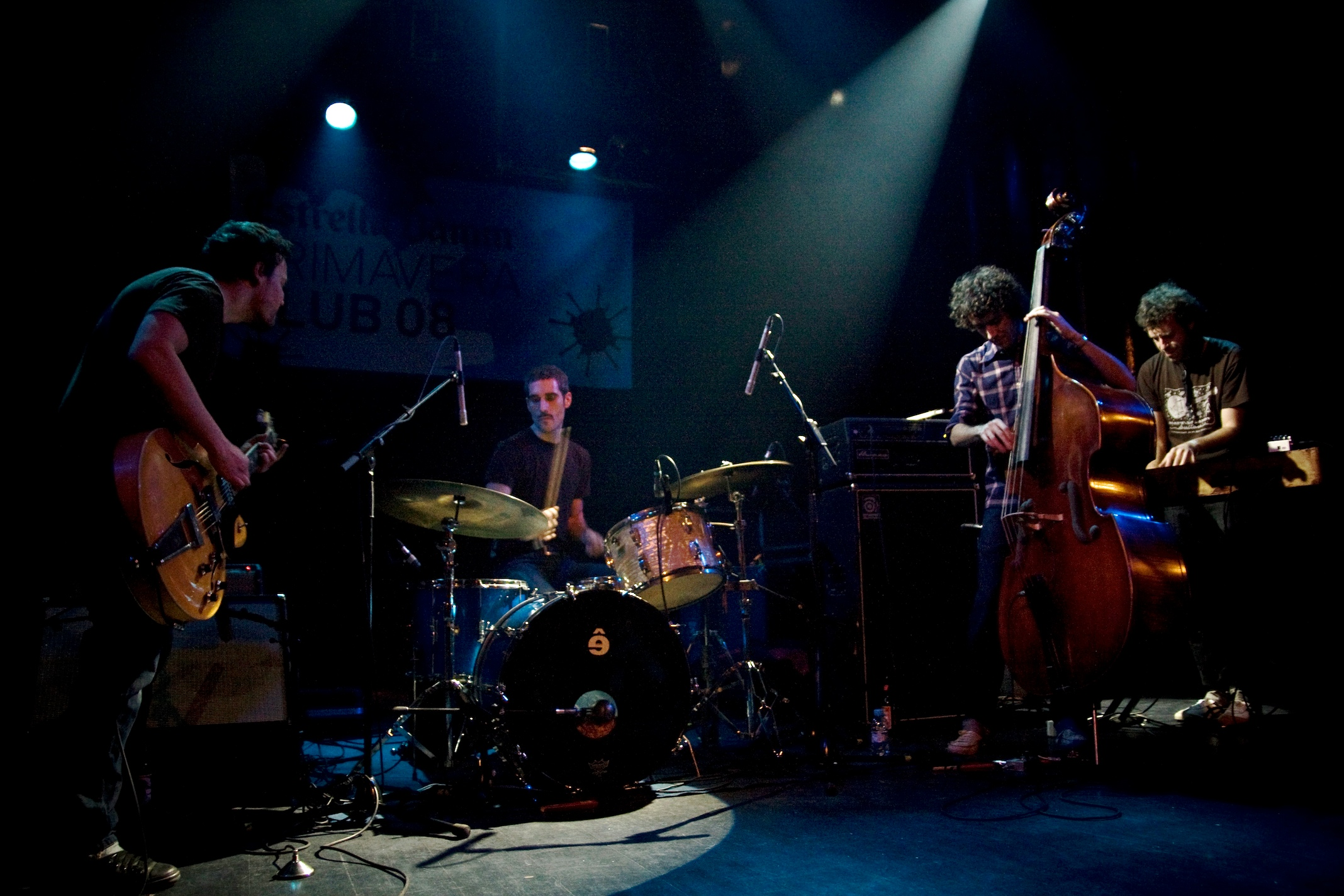
- 12twelve in Barcelona (2008)

Background information
- Origin: Barcelona, Catalonia, Spain
- Genres: Post-rock
- Years active: 1998–2008; 2019-
- Label: Acuarela Discos
- Members: Jaume L. Pantaleón; Javier García; José Roselló; Jens Neumaier

12Twelve is a post-rock band from Barcelona (Catalonia, Spain) formed by Jaume L. Pantaleón (guitar), Javier García (doublebass), José Roselló (drums) and Jens Neumaier (sax and keyboards).

== History ==
Formed in 1998, they recorded their first demo in December 1998 with David from Beef as a producer.

In June 2001, they released the first album, called Tears, Complaint and Spaces, published by BOA Music. It was a big surprise in Spain and the band played with bands like 90 Day Men, Do Make Say Think, and Mogwai.

In 2002, they recorded a split album with the Bilbao band Ya te digo. The album was released by Astro Discos.

In 2003, the band went to Chicago to record their new album with Steve Albini, after winning the best band prize in the prestigious Villa de Bilbao Contest. They recorded the album in June, and released it in October.

In 2006, they released their fourth album with the label Acuarela. With this album, the band played in the same year in all the important festivals in Spain: Festival Internacional de Benicàssim, Sónar, Primavera Sound and Metrorock. They were cover of Rockdelux Magazine in March 2006.

In November 2006, they made an Italian tour with a great success.

On December the 10th 2008, before playing on the Primavera Club Festival at Apolo concert hall, they announced it was the last concert in Barcelona and confirmed the band is officially splitting up after 10 years of being together.

Members of the band were working on several projects as AtletA, Rebuig, and Gambardella. In 2019, the band reencountered for AMFest for a unique concert. However, they announced more concerts after the reencounter. On March 21, they participated in the Basque festival MAZ Basauri and launched a live video of its track Leroy, recorded in the AMFest 2019. They also were in Barcelona's festival BAM (Barcelona Acció Musical).

== Discography ==
- Tears, complaint and spaces (2001, BOA)
- Doppler (with Ya Te Digo) (2002, Astro)
- Speritismo (2003, BOA)
- L'Univers (2006, Acuarela)
