= Cutters Choice =

Brand of hand-rolling tobacco

- Product type: Hand-rolling tobacco
- Current owner: British American Tobacco
- Produced by: British American Tobacco
- Country: Netherlands

Cutters Choice is a fine-cut hand-rolling tobacco manufactured in the Netherlands by British American Tobacco. It is sold in 30 g and 50 g pouches. Prior to 20 May 2017, when the sale of smaller quantities of tobacco was outlawed in the EU, it used to be sold in 10 g, 12.5 g, 25 g & 50 g pouches. In addition, Cutters Choice was previously available in 50 g tins as well as 100 g pouches which were both discontinued in 2017.

== Overview ==
The EU Tobacco Products Directive which took effect on 1 July 2017 removed all brandings, descriptions, and attractive colourisation from tobacco products, leaving only government health warnings and, disturbing pictures of tobacco-related illnesses. Only the manufacturer's name and brands are allowed to distinguish one pouch from another. The use of tobacco strength indicators with words such as 'light' or 'smooth' was also outlawed leaving the industry to use somewhat subliminal brand names for their products. In Cutter's Choice case, their 'smooth' blend became 'extra fine'. The 'extra fine' blend is simply cut slightly finer than the original but it has a noticeably harsher flavour.

Cutters Choice is a blend of gold and bronze Virginia tobacco and has mild, smooth and flavourful qualities. Cutters Choice is mainly smoked in the United Kingdom and Ireland and its popularity is attributed to its mid-range pricing strategy.
