= This Is a Hospital =

Studio album by The Ghost
- Released: March 5, 2002
- Recorded: Aug 2001
- Genre: Emo, indie rock
- Length: 37:40
- Label: Some
- Producer: Steve Albini

The Ghost chronology
This Is a Hospital (2002)	This Pen Is a Weapon (2004)

Professional ratings
Review scores
Source	Rating
Allmusic	3/5 stars
Pitchfork Media	(8.1/10)
Stylus Magazine	(C)

This Is a Hospital is the debut album by Chicago-based punk rock band The Ghost. It was released on March 5, 2002 on Some Records to generally positive reviews.

Jason D. Taylor from Allmusic described the lyrics as "scathing in their intensity yet brutally honest" and is an album which "displays much potential". He compares their musical arrangements to post-hardcore band Thursday. Pitchfork Media's Rob Mitchum calls the album a blend of "straightforward indie rock with some jagged post-punk hues for a rhythmic, powerful, incisive guitar-and-bass attack", and the band "distinguish themselves with some impressive songwriting.

== Track listing ==
All tracks are written by The Ghost.

No.	Title	Length
1.	"Death by the Bay"	2:52
2.	"On and On"	3:26
3.	"Gem, Mint Ten"	3:54
4.	"Groundswell"	2:39
5.	"My First and Last"	4:00
6.	"Diffuser"	4:34
7.	"By the Books"	5:34
8.	"A New Trick for the Old Dog"	3:22
9.	"The Exhibition"	3:26
10.	"Red Slippers Red Wheels"	3:50
Total length:		37:40
