= Murder, Inc. (band) =

British industrial music group

- Murder, Inc. circa 1991; clockwise from the far left: Walker, Ferguson, Connelly, Bechdel, Raven, Atkins

Background information
- Origin: United Kingdom
- Genres: Industrial rock; alternative rock
- Years active: 1991–1992
- Labels: Invisible; Devotion
- Past members: Chris Connelly; Geordie Walker; Paul Raven; "Big Paul" Ferguson; John Bechdel; Martin Atkins

Murder, Inc. were a British industrial music supergroup formed in 1991, featuring Killing Joke members Geordie Walker, Paul Raven, "Big Paul" Ferguson, John Bechdel, and Martin Atkins, in addition to vocalist Chris Connelly.

== History ==
Martin Atkins joined Killing Joke as their drummer and later their manager in 1988. The band recorded the 1990 album Extremities, Dirt and Various Repressed Emotions after which they parted ways with singer Jaz Coleman. Along with Atkins on drums, the remaining lineup of Killing Joke consisted of Geordie Walker on guitar, Paul Raven on bass, and John Bechdel (a live member only) on keyboards. With that lineup intact, Atkins formed Murder, Inc., recruiting Chris Connelly (who had worked with Ministry amongst others) to replace Coleman as vocalist and former Killing Joke member Paul Ferguson as a second drummer.

The band released their debut EP Corpuscle (which featured tracks remixed by J. G. Thirlwell) in 1991. The band quickly followed it up with their eponymous album in 1992. The album was recorded by Steve Albini, who had already worked with Atkins on the Pigface album Gub and with Connelly on his album Whiplash Boychild. The band played five live dates before disbanding later in 1992, due to "internal squabbles".

In 1998, Connelly, Atkins, and Walker reconvened and formed another industrial supergroup, with Jah Wobble and Lee Fraser, called The Damage Manual.

== Personnel ==
- Martin Atkins – drums
- John Bechdel – keyboards
- Chris Connelly – vocals
- Paul Ferguson – drums
- Paul Raven – bass
- Geordie Walker – guitar

== Discography ==
- Corpuscle (1991, EP)
- Murder, Inc. (1992, LP)
- "Mania" (1992, single)
- Locate Subvert Terminate – The Complete Murder, Inc. (1999, compilation)
- Demos & Live Unreleased (2024, compilation)
