= The Forms (band) =

American indie rock band

- Origin: Queens, New York, U.S.
- Genres: Indie rock, math rock
- Years active: 2003–present
- Labels: Threespheres; Rebel Group/ADA; Triple Down
- Members: Alex Tween; Matt Walsh

The Forms are an American indie rock band from Queens, New York, whose style incorporates aspects of math rock, dream pop, and emo. The band members include Alex Tween (vox, keyboards) and Matt Walsh (drums, sequencers).

== History ==
The Forms released their debut album, Icarus, in February 2003. The album was recorded with legendary producer Steve Albini (Nirvana, Pixies, P. J. Harvey) at the helm. They worked with Albini again on their latest (self-titled) album, which was released in October 2007.

In 2011, they released their first EP, Derealization, which featured The National’s Matt Berninger on vocals, as well as Shudder to Think's Craig Wedren.

The Forms recorded a cover of Billy Joel's "We Didn't Start the Fire" for Engine Room Recordings' compilation album Guilt by Association Vol. 2, which was released in November 2008.

On June 21, 2021, they released a single Southern Ocean on the label Threespheres and announced a vinyl release via the Open Ocean label.

On September 13, 2021, they released a single Head Underwater on the label Threespheres and announced a vinyl release via the Open Ocean label.

On November 1, 2021, they released a single All Souls Day on the label Threespheres and announced a vinyl release via the Open Ocean label.

On March 28, 2022, they released a single Latch on the label Threespheres and announced a vinyl release via the Open Ocean label.

The band has shared the stage with bands like The National, The Hold Steady, St. Vincent, OK Go, Deerhunter, Minus the Bear, Ted Leo and Nick Cave.

== Reception ==
At the time of the debut release, reviews were generally very positive, and critics compared the band favorably to early-emo rock group Sunny Day Real Estate. Mac Randall of The New York Observer described the band as "aggro-artsy trio fond of awkward time signatures, sly rhythmic manipulation, curlicuing vocal lines, and giving one song two separate track numbers for no obvious reason... [T]hese guys make a virtue out of attention-deficit disorder." PopMatters called the band "one of the most exciting, if not one of the best, new acts in indie rock right now."

== Discography ==
=== Studio albums ===
- Icarus (2003)
- The Forms (2007)

=== EPs ===
- Derealization (2011)

=== Compilation ===
- "We Didn't Start the Fire" from the Guilt by Association Vol. 2 compilation

=== Singles ===
- Southern Ocean (2021)
- Head Underwater (2021)
- All Souls Day (2021)
- Latch (2022)
