= Space Streakings =

Japanese band

- Origin: Japan
- Genres: Noise rock
- Years active: 1993–1996
- Labels: NUX Organization, Skin Graft
- Past members: Captain Insect; Kame Bazooka; Karate Condor; Screaming Stomach

Space Streakings was a noise rock band from Japan formed in 1993 by four video game programmers. That year the band issued its debut album, Hatsukoi, through NUX Organization. The Space Streakings then signed with Skin Graft Records, whose attention had been piqued by the band's contribution to the Dead Tech 3: New Japanese Music compilation. In 1994, musician and music engineer Steve Albini flew to Japan in order to record the band's second album 7-Toku. Shortly after the album's release, Screaming Stomach, who had grown tired of the band's cacophonous sound, left the band. After a brief tour of the United States, which resulted in a collaboration with Mount Shasta of Chicago, Space Streakings disbanded.

== Discography ==
Studio albums

- Hatsukoi (1993, NUX Organization)
- 7-Toku (1994, Skin Graft)
- with Mount Shasta: Space Streakings Sighted Over Mount Shasta (1996, Skin Graft)
