= Sloy =

French indie rock band

- Origin: Béziers, France
- Genres: Noise rock; post-hardcore
- Years active: 1991–2000
- Labels: RoseBud; Roadrunner; Tubes
- Past members: Armand Gonzalez; Cyril Bilbeaud; Virginie Peitavi

Sloy was a French indie rock band, formed in 1991 and disbanded in 2000. The band was formed in Béziers but relocated to Rennes, in Brittany the year of their formation because the audience in their native region was not receptive to their music. They emerged thanks to the collaboration of Steve Albini, who produced their first albums.

== Discography ==
=== Albums ===
- 1995 : Plug (prod. du Fer/Roadrunner, produced by Steve Albini)
- 1996 : Planet of Tubes (Tubes/Pias, produced by Steve Albini)
- 1998 : Electrelite (Tubes/Pias)

=== EPs ===
- Fuse - 1994, Rosebud
- Pop - 1995, Prod.du Fer/Roadrunner
- Electric Session 1 - 1997, Tubes Records
