= Over the Sun =

Studio album by Shannon Wright
- Released: 2004
- Length: 42:18
- Label: Quarterstick Records

Shannon Wright chronology
Dyed in the Wool (2001)	Over the Sun (2004)	Yann Tiersen & Shannon Wright (2004)

Professional ratings
Review scores
Source	Rating
AllMusic	4/5 stars
Pitchfork Media	6.5/10
Tiny Mix Tapes	3.5/5 stars

Over the Sun is a 2004 album by Shannon Wright.

== Track listing ==
1. Intro/With Closed Eyes – 4:39
2. Portray – 5:36
3. Black Little Stray – 6:20
4. You'll Be the Death – 4:07
5. Throw a Blanket Over the Sun – 4:25
6. Avalanche – 4:49
7. If Only We Could – 4:07
8. Plea – 4:08
9. Birds – 4:07

=== Japanese bonus track ===
10. Insolvable Self – 4:11
