= Space Streakings Sighted Over Mount Shasta =

Studio album by Shakuhachi Surprise
- Released: October 1, 1996
- Genre: Noise rock
- Length: 30:06
- Label: Skin Graft
- Producer: Steve Albini

Space Streakings chronology
7-Toku (1994)	Space Streakings Sighted Over Mount Shasta (1996)

Professional ratings
Review scores
Source	Rating
Allmusic	1.5/5 stars

Space Streakings Sighted Over Mount Shasta is an album by Mount Shasta and Space Streakings, released on October 1, 1996 through Skin Graft Records.

== Track listing ==
All tracks are written by Shakuhachi Surprise

No.	Title	Length
1.	"Swavay"	4:11
2.	"Harduro... Deso Deso (?)"	3:44
3.	"Shacho"	3:25
4.	"Yadoroku Diamondo"	2:23
5.	"Tora! Tora! Tora! Senzuri"	2:59
6.	"Jushoku"	2:28
7.	"Oresama "Big J""	3:10
8.	"Nande"	2:10
9.	"Kick on Cigarette (Kekkon Shitekure)"	5:36

== Personnel ==
Musicians

- Jason Benson – drums, percussion
- Carl Brueggen – guitar
- Captain Insect – bass guitar, vocals, horns
- John Forbes – vocals, guitar, harmonica
- Kame Bazooka – alto saxophone, vocals
- Karate Condor – turntables, guitar, horns
- Jenny White – guitar, bass guitar, vocals

Production and additional personnel

- Steve Albini – production
- Nobtack Koike – illustrations
- Rob Syers – illustrations
