= Icarus (The Forms album) =

Studio album by The Forms
- Released: February 4, 2003
- Genre: Pop rock, indie rock
- Length: 18:13
- Label: Threespheres
- Producer: Steve Albini

The Forms chronology
Icarus (2003)	The Forms (2007)

Professional ratings
Review scores
Source	Rating
AllMusic	3/5 stars
PopMatters	positive

Icarus is the first studio album by The Forms, produced by Steve Albini and released on February 4, 2003.

== Track listing ==
1. "Stel" — 0:57
2. "Stel (Continued)" — 1:24
3. "Innizar" — 0:15
4. "Innizar (Continued)" — 3:28
5. "Sunday" — 2:21
6. "Sunday (Continued)" — 0:30
7. "Seagull" — 1:36
8. "Classical" — 3:42
9. "Stravinsky" — 1:51
10. "Black Metal" — 2:09

== Reception ==
Upon release, Icarus gained generally positive reviews, and critics compared the band favorably to early-emo rock group Sunny Day Real Estate. Mac Randall of The New York Observer described the band as "aggro-artsy trio fond of awkward time signatures, sly rhythmic manipulation, curlicuing vocal lines, and giving one song two separate track numbers for no obvious reason... [T]hese guys make a virtue out of attention-deficit disorder." PopMatters called the band "one of the most exciting, if not one of the best, new acts in indie rock right now."
