= Pills vs. Planes =

Pills Versus Planes

EP by Ativin
- Released: 2 December 1996
- Genre: Instrumental rock, math rock
- Length: 23:45
- Label: Polyvinyl Record Co.
- Producer: Steve Albini and Carl Saff

Ativin chronology
Pills Versus Planes (1996)	German Water (1999)

The Pills Versus Planes EP is the debut release from Bloomington, Indiana-based instrumental group, Ativin.

== Track listing ==
1. "I Know One-Hundred Things" – 5:30
2. "King's Ship" – 5:15
3. "Mass" – 4:20
4. "Metallic Boy" – 1:17
5. "Meditational Flaws" – 7:23
