= Murder, Inc. (album) =

Studio album by Murder, Inc.
- Released: June 22, 1992
- Genre: Industrial rock; alternative rock
- Length: 42:36
- Label: Invisible
- Producer: Murder, Inc.

Murder, Inc. chronology
Corpuscle EP (1992)	Murder, Inc. (1992)	Locate Subvert Terminate: The Complete Murder Inc. (1999)

Murder, Inc. is the only studio album by the industrial rock supergroup Murder, Inc., featuring members of Killing Joke and Revolting Cocks. Originally released on Invisible Records in 1992, it was subsequently reworked and reissued in 1993, with contributions from JG Thirlwell. The album was recorded by Steve Albini.

The album was subsequently included in the band's 1999 compilation album, Locate Subvert Terminate: The Complete Murder Inc.

== Critical reception ==
Professional ratings
Review scores
Source	Rating
AllMusic	2.5/5 stars

The album received a mixed response from critics and fans. AllMusic critic Tim DiGravina unfavorably compared the record's sound to Killing Joke's 1990 album, Extremities, Dirt and Various Repressed Emotions, describing the tracks to "Killing Joke on a bad day" or a "hit and miss affair". Nevertheless, he also praised vocalist Chris Connelly's vocals, stating that "the dynamics make for a thrilling beast" when "his bandmates allow him room to breathe." Billboard described the music as "not terribly comfortable mix of industrial music and hard rock that will be either too soft or not tough enough for listeners' tastes." Trouser Press stated that band's "the viscous drones on Murder Inc. are at least comparable to Killing Joke (particularly Walker's pernicious guitar), if nowhere near as memorable."

== Track listing ==
1992 CD edition

All tracks are written by Martin Atkins, John Bechdel, Chris Connelly, Paul Ferguson, Paul Raven and Geordie Walker.

1. "Supergrass" — 5:48
2. "Murder, Inc." — 6:42
3. "Mania" — 5:08
4. "Hole in the Wall" — 4:36
5. "Uninvited Guest" — 5:05
6. "Gambit" — 3:45
7. "Red Black" — 3:32
8. "Last of the Urgents" — 5:33
9. "Mrs. Whiskey Name" — 2:27

== Personnel ==
Album personnel as adapted from CD liner notes from 1992 issue:

- Martin Atkins — writer, performer
- John Bechdel — writer, performer
- Chris Connelly — writer, performer
- Paul Ferguson — writer, performer
- Paul Raven — writer, performer
- Geordie Walker — writer, performer
- Murder, Inc. — producer
- Steve Albini — recording engineer
