= Hanalei (band) =

Hanalei is an indie rock/folk band from the Chicago area, and Bay Area in California. Brian Moss heads the band along with Pete Croke and others from bands such as The Pines. Moss a singer/songwriter from the Bay Area (San Francisco) who later moved to Chicago and back again; his previous bands include Great Apes, The Ghost and The Wunder Years. Hanalei began as a solo project of Brian Moss after The Ghost broke up, and after one release entitled "We Are All Natural Disasters", Hanalei became a four-piece band, moving away from Postal Service-esque sound, and becoming a folky-earthy sounding band.

The band released "Parts and Accessories" in 2006.

== Discography ==
=== Albums ===
- We Are All Natural Disasters, Thick Records, 2004
- Parts and Accessories, Thick Records, 2006
- One Big Night, Brick Gun Records (US)/Big Scary Monsters(UK), 2010

=== EPs ===
- Hurricane We, Self Released, 2003

=== Splits ===
- Fifteen / For.The.Win. / Hanalei - Can You Spare Some Change? Split 7", Solidarity Recordings, 2010

Side B: Hanalei - Petroleum Distillation (Fifteen Cover)

- Aspiga / Hanalei - Split 7", Jump Start Records (JST-072), 2012

Side B: Hanalei - Get Gone
Digital Download Only Track: Hanalei - Cut Dead

=== Live ===
- Hanalei Live at Schubas 01/07/2005, Re:Live, 2005 - Digital Release

=== Compilations ===
- Mean It Man, Thick Records, 2005

Track 9: Action Drum
Track 21: Chamomile (Live)
