= Ativin =

American post-rock band

- Origin: Bloomington, Indiana, United States
- Genres: Math rock, post-rock, instrumental rock, slowcore
- Years active: 1994–1999, 2001–2004, 2014–2015, 2021–present
- Labels: Polyvinyl Record Co. Secretly Canadian; Joyful Noise Recordings
- Members: Chris Carothers; Dan Burton; Chris Brokaw
- Past members: Rory Leitch; Kevin Duneman; Joey Ficken; Mark Rice; Jonathan Ford
- Website: Official site

Ativin is a post-rock/math rock band from Bloomington, Indiana. Chris Carothers and Dan Burton of Early Day Miners make up their core, with a revolving door of drummers. Currently located at Nashville, Tennessee.

== History ==
Ativin was founded in late 1994 by Indiana University students Chris Carothers (guitar) and Rory Leitch (drums). The group became a trio the following spring with the addition of guitarist Dan Burton. This lineup recorded the band's debut EP, Pills vs. Planes, which was released in December 1996.

In 1997, Ativin released the "Modern Gang Reader" / "Larkin" single via Secretly Canadian. Their debut LP, German Water, followed in March 1999. Jonathan Cohen from AllMusic praised the band's compositional skills and described their sound as possessing an "intelligent heaviness."

Following a tour in support of the album, Ativin disbanded. Dan Burton subsequently formed a new group, Early Day Miners.

In 2001, Ativin returned with a new drummer, Kevin Duneman, and released their second studio album, Interiors, in 2002. Jason Nickey from Pitchfork observed that the band's sound had changed significantly following the reunion. Nickey criticized Duneman's drumming for "lacking the punch and quick snaps" of former drummer Rory Leitch. Additionally, he compared Burton's guitar work to that of Early Day Miners, suggesting that Interiors felt more like an Early Day Miners release.

== Members ==
=== Current members ===
- Chris Carothers – guitar (1994–1999, 2001–2004, 2014–2015, 2021–present), vocals (1995–1996, 2001–2004, 2021–2023) (also baritone guitar (1997–1998, 2001–2002), bass (2001–2002), drums, synthesizer, organ)
- Dan Burton – guitar (1994–1999, 2001–2004, 2014–2015, 2021–present), vocals (2001–2004, 2014–2015), electronics (1997–1999, 2001–2004) (also bass (2001–2002), synthesizer, keyboards, noise, tapes)
- Chris Brokaw – drums (2021–present) (also bass (2021–2023))

=== Former members ===
- unknown name – bass (1994)
- unknown name – bass (1994)
- Rory Leitch – drums (1994–1999)
- Kevin Duneman – drums (2001–2002)
- Joey Ficken – drums (2002–2003)
- Mark Rice – drums (2003–2004, 2014–2015)
- Jonathan Ford – bass (2014–2015)

=== Session and guest members ===
- Rebecca Rice – viola (1995) (track "Slovenia" (1996))
- Molly Kien – cello (2001) (on "Interiors" (2002))
- Maggie Polk – viola (2001) (on "Interiors" (2002))
- Eric Weddle – electronics (no-input mixing board) (2003) (on "Night Mute" (2004))
- Alison Chesley – cello (2021) (on "Austere" (2023), track "Mirrors Secured"))
- Mattia Ferrarini – loops (2021) (on "Austere" (2023), track "Mirrors Secured")
- Mark Shippy – ambient guitar (2021) (on "Austere" (2023), download bonus track "Ativincense")
- Natasha Noramly – vocals (2022) (track "Mountain Visions" (2023))

== Discography ==
- Demo (self-released, 1995)
- Pills Versus Planes EP (Polyvinyl Record Co., 1996)
- Modern Gang Reader / Larkin - 7" single (Secretly Canadian, 1997)
- German Water (Secretly Canadian, 1999)
- Summing the Approach EP (Secretly Canadian, 1999)
- Interiors (Secretly Canadian, 2002)
- Night Mute (Secretly Canadian, 2004)
- Mountain Visions - digital single (Joyful Noise Recordings, 2023)
- Austere (Joyful Noise Recordings, Fonoradar, 2023)
- Hidden Tracks: 1995-1996 compilation (Secretly Canadian, 2024)

=== Compilation appearances ===
- "I Know 100 Things" on "Ooh Do I Love You" (The Core For Care, 1996)
- "Slovenia" on "Polyvinyl Record Co. Free Sampler Spring/Summer 1997" (Polyvinyl Record Co., 1997) [originally appeared on Pills Versus Planes EP]
- "Riding and Roaming" on "Zum Audio Vol. 2" (Zum, 1998) [later appeared on Summing the Approach EP]
- "Halls of Medicine" and "Back at the Lab" on "Regeneration: The Me Generation Recordings Compilation 1998" (The Me Generation Recordings, 1998)
- "Fortune Telling Fish" on "St Ives" (Secretly Canadian, 1999) [originally appeared on German Water]
- "My Eyes of Yours" on "How to Be a Hero" (Prizefight Records, 1999) [originally appeared on Summing the Approach]
- "Hell Hammer (Live)" on "Currents and Directions" (Meridien, 2002)
- "Underwater" on "A Little Winter Warmth - A Sensory Projects Compilation" (Sensory Projects, Cavalier Music, 2002) [originally appeared on Interiors]
- "Wings and Trees" on "For Jonathan" (The Great Vitamin Mystery, 2004)
- "Soft Evenings" on "SC100" (Secretly Canadian, 2007)
- "Concentrate" on "Defunct Indiana" (Joyful Noise Recordings, Musical Family Tree Records, 2012) [originally appeared on Night Mute]

== See also ==
- Early Day Miners
