= 7-Toku =

Studio album by Space Streakings
- Released: October 3, 1994
- Genre: Noise rock
- Length: 39:08
- Label: Skin Graft
- Producer: Steve Albini

Space Streakings chronology
Hatsukoi (1993)	7-Toku (1994)	Space Streakings Sighted Over Mount Shasta (1996)

Professional ratings
Review scores
Source	Rating
The Encyclopedia of Popular Music	3/5 stars
NME	7/10 stars

7-Toku is the second album by Space Streakings. It was released on October 3, 1994, by Skin Graft Records.

== Critical reception ==
The Encyclopedia of Popular Music called the album "a vivid new listening experience rather than a formulaic copy of a western style." Trouser Press wrote: "Far more boisterous and a lot less methodical than American industrialists, the quartet rushes in and around its tracks, layering bits on to a point of distraction in which chaos would come as a welcome relief." The Chicago Reader wrote that the album "finds this whacked foursome proffering more cartoonish, progged-out approximations of the infinitely superior Boredoms."

== Track listing ==
All tracks are written by Space Streakings

No.	Title	Length
1.	"F.O.J.K."	2:00
2.	"Youngman II"	3:39
3.	"Fire (Made in Asia)"	3:48
4.	"Houkago Seikan Aesthe"	3:06
5.	"Special Karaoke King"	4:29
6.	"Zurineta (Never Listen! For Discoattacker Only)"	2:35
7.	"Kai Kai Scratch"	3:47
8.	"Surf on 7th Beat"	4:13
9.	"Come Up"	2:15
10.	"Noruze Thrillercar"	4:59
11.	"GetterRobo G"	4:18

== Personnel ==
Adapted from 7-Toku liner notes.

Space Streakings

- Captain Insect – bass guitar, vocals, programming
- Kame Bazooka – alto saxophone, vocals, horns
- Karate Condor – turntables, vocals, guitar
- Screaming Stomach – guitar, vocals, trumpet, kazoo

Production and design

- Steve Albini – production, engineering, recording
- Nobtack Koike – cover art, illustrations

== Release history ==
Region	Date	Label	Format	Catalog
United States	1994	Skin Graft	CD, CS, LP	GR 22
