= Electrical Audio =

Recording studio in Chicago, USA

Coordinates: 41.9392°N 87.6938°W

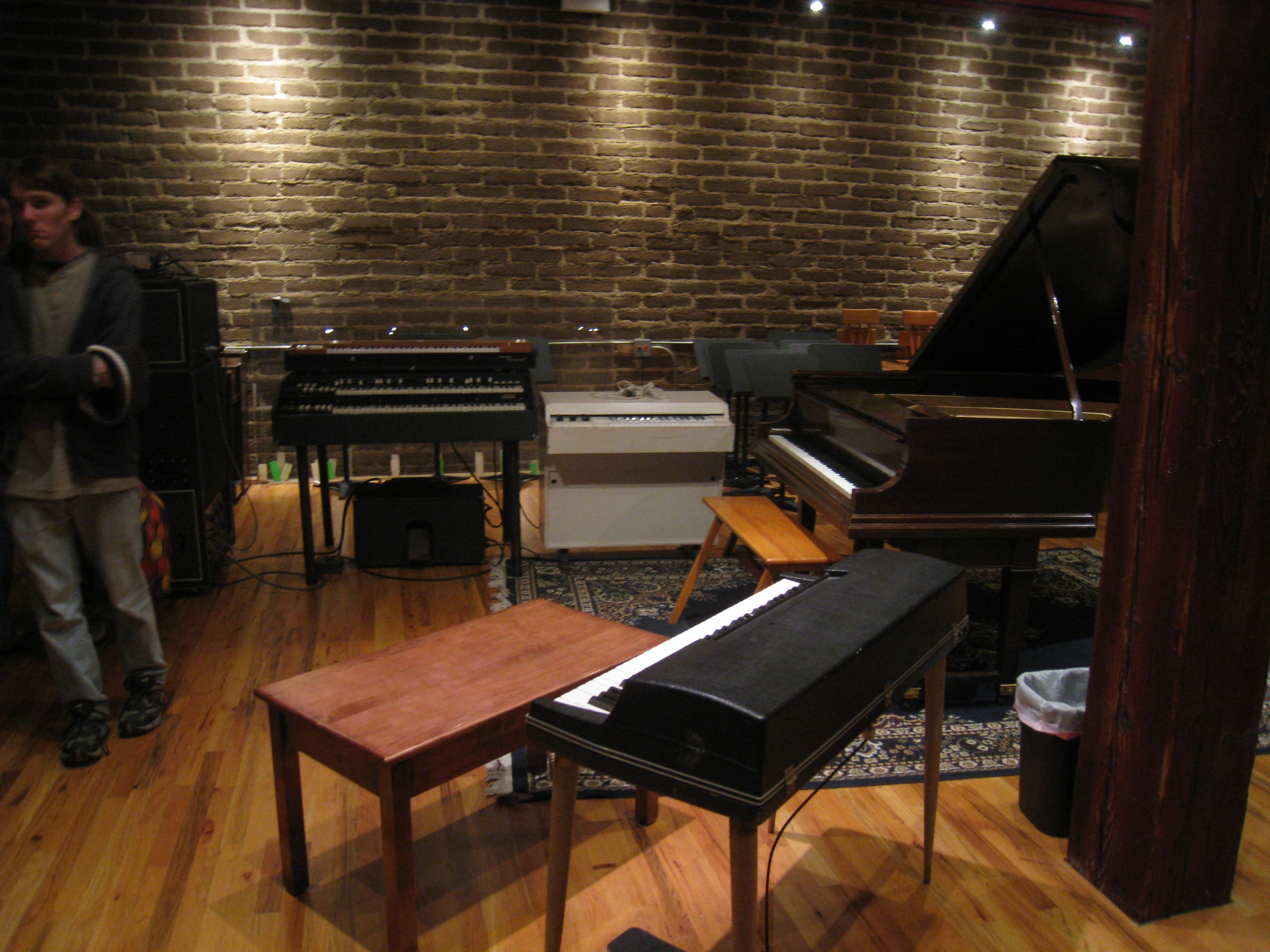
Studio A in 2011, with adobe brick walls and vintage keyboards

Electrical Audio is a recording facility founded in Chicago, Illinois by musician and recording engineer Steve Albini in 1997. Hundreds of independent music projects have been recorded there. Unlike most producers, Albini refused to take any royalties from musicians who record at the studio.

Founded during an era of increasing popularity for digital recording, Electrical Audio was unusual for using only analog recording technology, including mixing consoles, tape recorders and many outboard sound effects. The rooms are also designed to offer natural reverberation rather than adding the quality in post-production.

In a 2007 post on the studio's message board, the studio's technician Greg Norman revealed that the studio had acquired a Pro Tools rig for computer-aided recording and editing, saying it had become "as important to have as a piano". Norman also went on to write that Albini, who disliked digital recording, "won't be recording with [Pro Tools]. So don't ask him about it."

Albini died after a heart attack in May 2024. Electrical Audio resumed recording sessions two days later under its remaining staff.

In 2025, Electrical Audio was included as a new site in the Chicago Architecture Center's Open House Chicago program.

== Studio layout ==
The facility was built by gutting an existing building and customizing the space to Albini's specifications, including walls made of adobe bricks shipped from New Mexico. Electrical Audio comprises two separate studios, A and B.

=== Studio A ===
Studio A is the larger of the two studios and has three separate performance rooms. Center Field is the largest at 1,200 square feet (110 m^{2}), Alcatraz is a 'dry environment' room and Kentucky is a brighter live room with improved low frequency linearity. The control room runs a 48 channel Neotek Elite console and can accommodate up to 132 inputs.

=== Studio B ===
Studio B is the smaller of the two studios with an 800 square feet (74 m^{2}) live room and a 300 square feet (28 m^{2}) isolation room. The control room runs a 36 input Neotek Series II console.

== See also ==
- List of Steve Albini's recording projects, many of which were recorded at Electrical Audio
