= Paul Ferguson =

English drummer

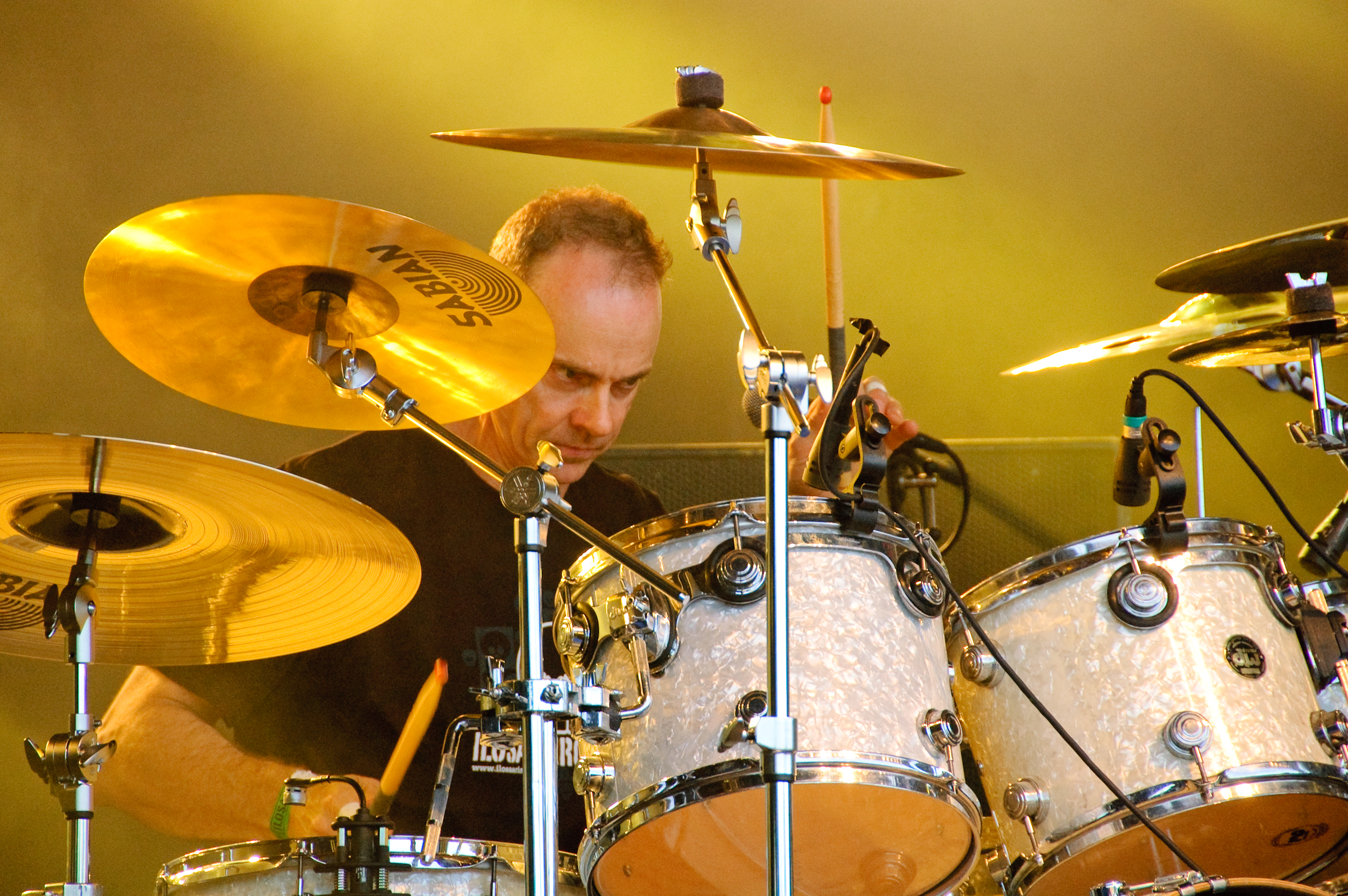
- Ferguson performing in 2009

Background information
- Born: Matthew Paul Ferguson; 31 March 1958 (age 68)
- Genres: Industrial; alternative metal; post-punk
- Instruments: Drums; vocals
- Years active: 1979–present

Matthew Paul Ferguson (born 31 March 1958) is an English rock drummer, best known for his work in the post-punk and industrial group Killing Joke and cult English punk band Pink Parts. Following a stint as the drummer with the London-based Matt Stagger Band in 1978, Ferguson became a founding member of Killing Joke and served as their drummer from 1979 to 1987. He was known as Big Paul Ferguson during this period. Ferguson is known for his tribal drum style.

Following disagreements with lead singer Jaz Coleman about new material and the direction of the band, Ferguson and bassist Paul Raven departed the band in 1987 during the recording of their seventh studio album Outside The Gate.

He then worked on other musical projects, notably with Warrior Soul (1987–1990), Murder, Inc. (1991–92) and Crush (1992–93) - the latter was mainly a collaboration with former Siouxsie and the Banshees guitarist John Valentine Carruthers. During the following years, Ferguson moved to Puerto Rico, then to the United States, and he became a sculptor and art restorer, specialising in ancient sculptures. He also briefly played with The Orb and took up guitar.

Ferguson rejoined Killing Joke for their 2008 reunion, and original line-up was together for the first time since 1982. Ferguson recorded with Killing Joke for the first time in 23 years for their 2010 studio album Absolute Dissent. He remains with Killing Joke, having played drums on their April 2012 album release MMXII and subsequent tour as well as their 2015 release Pylon.

2015 saw the launch of Boneyard, a line of skull-and-bone jewelry designed by Ferguson. Each unique piece is individually cast and hand finished in solid sterling silver.

In 2018, he brought out an EP titled Remote Viewing under the banner BPF - as for the initials of his surname Big Paul Ferguson. The EP was recorded with guitarist Mark Thwaite. It included seven tracks of spoken word, with instrumentation. That year, he also recorded drums for Thwaite's band MGT on the album Gemini Nyte.

In 2021, he released his first solo album Virtual Control on Cleopatra Records. It was also conceived with Thwaite, with the help of producer Tom Dalgety. Virtual Control was issued in May on vinyl and CD. Two videos were shot to promote the album; one for the leading track "The Unraveling" and one for the second song "Extrapolate". These songs were uploaded on YouTube on the Cleopatra channel.

== Discography ==
Solo

- Remote Viewing EP (2018)
- Virtual Control (2021)
- Remote Viewing - Reboot (2022)

With Killing Joke

- Turn to Red/Almost Red EP (1979)
- Killing Joke (1980)
- What's THIS For...! (1981)
- Ha! Killing Joke Live (1982)
- Revelations (1982)
- Fire Dances (1983)
- Night Time (1985)
- Brighter Than a Thousand Suns (1986)
- Absolute Dissent (2010)
- MMXII (2012)
- Pylon (2015)
- Lord of Chaos EP (2022)

With Warrior Soul

- Last Decade Dead Century (1990)

With Murder, Inc.

- Corpuscle EP (1992)
- Murder Inc. (1992)

With Crush

- Crush (1993)

=== With Light Of Eternity ===
- Edge Of Fate (2024)
- Aftershock (2024)
- Collateral (2025)

With Sevendials

- A Crash Course In Catastrophe (2025)

== Bibliography ==
- Reynolds, Simon (2005). Rip It Up and Start Again: Postpunk 1978–1984. London: Faber and Faber. ISBN 0571215696.
