= This Moment in Black History =

American punk rock band

- Origin: Cleveland, Ohio, U.S.
- Genres: Punk rock
- Years active: 2002–present
- Labels: Version City, Cold Sweat, Smog Veil, Snax Records
- Members: Bim Thomas (drums), Chris Kulcsar (keyboards, vocals), Buddy Akita (guitar), Lawrence Caswell (bass guitar)
- Past members: Mike D'Amico

This Moment in Black History is an American punk rock band from Cleveland, Ohio, formed in 2002.

== History ==
This Moment in Black History formed in 2002 and released its debut EP, "The Cleveland Finger", in 2003. In 2004, they released their first full-length album, "Midwesterncuttalistick", on the Version City label. In 2005, founding bassist Mike D'Amico was replaced by Lawrence Caswell.

In the fall of 2005, the band recorded its second album, "It Takes a Nation of Assholes", with Steve Albini. The album was released the following year on the Cold Sweat label. In 2009, the band released another album, entitled "Public Square", on Smog Veil Records. In December 2012, the band released its fourth album, Higher ≥ Deffer, on both Smog Veil and Snax Records.

== Reception ==
This Moment in Black History's music has been described as "half-, perhaps even quarter-assed Primus" and as "a punch-drunk mix of relentless Punk and Post Punk with some of the finest lyrics you’ll ever read from a Rock band."

== Discography ==
- Midwesterncuttalistick—2004 (Version City)
- It Takes a Nation of Assholes—2006 (Cold Sweat)
- Public Square—2009 (Smog Veil)
- Higher ≥ Deffer—2012 (Smog Veil/Snax)
