= NUX Organization =

Japanese record label

Nux Organization is a Japanese record label founded by Zeni Geva frontman KK Null. It has released records by Null and Zeni Geva as well as bands such as Shellac, Melt-Banana, Merzbow and others.

== See also ==
- List of record labels
