= Killing Joke discography =

List of recordings by English band Killing Joke

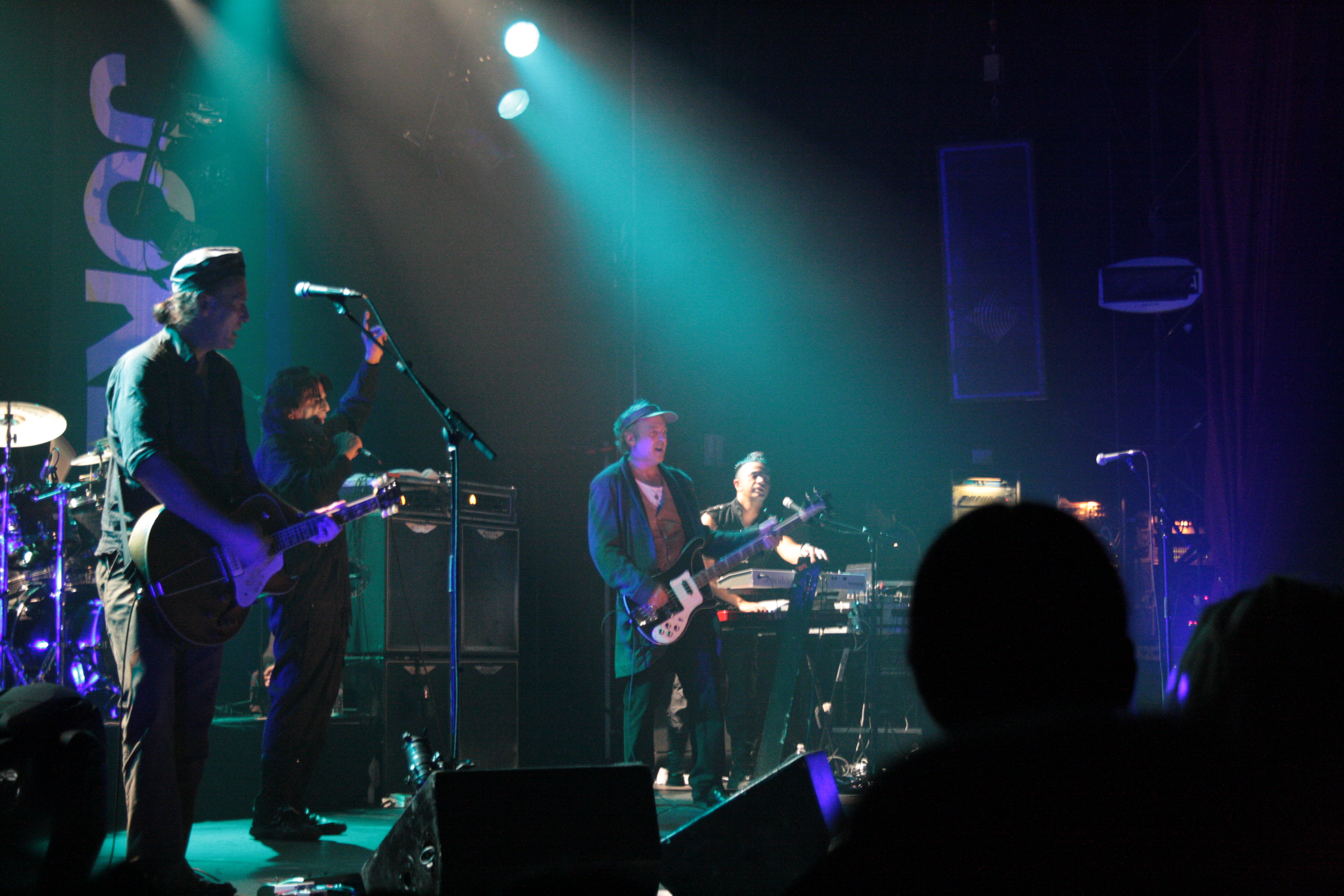
- Killing Joke performing in 2010
- Studio albums: 15
- Extended plays: 5
- Live albums: 17
- Compilation albums: 16
- Singles: 32
- Video albums: 4
- Music videos: 15

The discography of Killing Joke, a British rock band, consists of 15 studio albums, seven live albums, 14 compilation albums, five extended plays (EPs), 31 singles and four video albums. The band formed in late 1978–early 1979 in Notting Hill, London, England.

In October 1979, shortly after they began the Malicious Damage record label, Killing Joke released their debut EP, Turn to Red. It was shortly followed by their second EP, Almost Red, released in November, and by their first single, "Nervous System", released in December 1979. Their first studio album, Killing Joke, was released in 1980. The album, which peaked at number 39 on the UK Albums Chart, produced three singles: "Wardance", "Change" and "Requiem". Their second studio album, What's THIS For...!, was released in 1981 and reached number 42 in the UK. "Follow the Leaders", the only single to be released from the album, charted in the UK and in the U.S. Their third album, Revelations, was released in 1982 and peaked at number 12 in the UK, and number 33 in New Zealand. Two singles, "Empire Song" and "Chop-Chop", were released from the album, but only "Empire Song" charted in the UK. After the release of their third EP, Birds of a Feather and the eponymous single, which charted in the UK, Killing Joke released their fourth studio album, Fire Dances, in July 1983. The only single from Fire Dances, "Let's All Go (to the Fire Dances)", and the album both charted in the UK. In October, they released "Me or You?", a non-album single that charted in the UK.

Their fifth album, Night Time, was released in 1985. It achieved mainstream success, reaching number 11 in the UK, 8 in the Netherlands, and 50 in Sweden, receiving the silver certification in the UK. It was preceded by the single "Eighties", non-album single "A New Day" and "Love Like Blood", and followed by "Kings and Queens". All four singles charted in the UK, but "Love Like Blood" was an international hit and charted in Germany, Ireland, Netherlands and New Zealand. The album itself peaked at number 11 in the UK, 8 in Netherlands, and 50 in Sweden. In 1986, Killing Joke released their sixth studio album, Brighter Than a Thousand Suns, and two singles, "Adorations" and "Sanity". The album charted in the UK and in the U.S., and both singles only in the UK. Outside the Gate, their seventh studio album, was released in 1988. While it was not promoted, the album and two singles from it, "America" and "My Love of This Land", charted in the UK. Coleman and Walker temporarily decided to disband the band. The Courtauld Talks, released in 1989, was essentially a spoken word album. Killing Joke's eighth album, Extremities, Dirt & Various Repressed Emotions, was released in 1990. It included two singles, "The Beautiful Dead" and "Money Is Not Our God". A Killing Joke anthology, Laugh? I Nearly Bought One!, and two singles featuring "Change" and "Wardance" in several new versions remixed by Youth, were released in 1992. Pandemonium, released 1994, and Democracy, in 1996, resulted in five singles: "Exorcism", "Millennium" (a UK Top 40 hit), "Pandemonium" (a UK Top 30 hit), "Jana" and "Democracy" (a UK Top 40 hit).

After the Democracy tour, the band went on an extended hiatus until 2002, when Coleman, Geordie and Youth reformed Killing Joke. Their second self-titled album was released in 2003. The album reached the UK Top 40, and produced two singles, "Loose Cannon" (a UK Top 25 hit) and "Seeing Red". In February 2005, Killing Joke played two consecutive shows to commemorate their 25th anniversary. DVD and CD recordings from these concerts were released in the fall of 2005 as XXV Gathering: The Band That Preys Together Stays Together. In June, remastered and expanded editions of their two 1990s Butterfly Recordings albums, Pandemonium and Democracy, were released by Cooking Vinyl. These were followed in July by their first four albums (from Killing Joke to Ha!) on EMI. Hosannas from the Basements of Hell was released in April 2006 on Cooking Vinyl. The album made the UK Top 75. Early in 2007, Killing Joke released three archival collections via Candlelight Records: Inside Extremities, Bootleg Vinyl Archive Volumes 1 & 2 and, in October, Extremities, Dirt & Various Repressed Emotions. On 28 January 2008, the albums Fire Dances, Night Time, Brighter Than a Thousand Suns and Outside the Gate were reissued in remastered form with bonus tracks by EMI. Each of these carried the message: Dedicated to our brother Paul Vincent Raven 1961–2007.

In 2008, Killing Joke released Duende - The Spanish Sessions and an album of radio session recordings, The Peel Sessions 1979-1981. The EP In Excelsis was released in 2010, and the following studio album, Absolute Dissent, was released in September 2010. On 2 April 2012, Killing Joke released their 15th studio album, MMXII on Spinefarm Records/Universal. It reached number 44 on the UK albums chart upon its first week of release, and number 9 on the Finnish albums chart.

On 23 October 2015, the band released their 15th studio album, Pylon.

== Albums ==
=== Studio albums ===
| Year | Album | Peak chart positions | | | | | | | Certifications (sales thresholds) |
| Year | Album | UK | FIN | FRA | NL | NZ | SWE | US | Certifications (sales thresholds) |
|---|---|---|---|---|---|---|---|---|---|
| 1980 | Killing Joke: Release date: October 1980; Label: E.G., Polydor | 39 | — | — | — | — | — | — | |
| 1981 | What's THIS For...!: Release date: June 22, 1981; Label: E.G., Polydor | 42 | — | — | — | — | — | — | |
| 1982 | Revelations: Release date: April 1982; Label: E.G., Polydor | 12 | — | — | — | 33 | — | — | |
| 1983 | Fire Dances: Release date: July 15, 1983; Label: E.G., Polydor | 29 | — | — | — | — | — | — | |
| 1985 | Night Time: Release date: February 25, 1985; Label: E.G., Polydor | 11 | — | — | 10 | 8 | 50 | — | UK: Silver |
| 1986 | Brighter Than a Thousand Suns: Release date: November 10, 1986; Label: E.G., Virgin | 54 | — | — | — | — | — | 194 | — |
| 1988 | Outside the Gate: Release date: June 27, 1988; Label: E.G., Virgin | 92 | — | — | — | — | — | — | — |
| 1990 | Extremities, Dirt & Various Repressed Emotions: Release date: November 20, 1990; Label: Noise | — | — | — | — | — | — | — | — |
| 1994 | Pandemonium: Release date: July 25, 1994; Label: Butterfly, Zoo | 16 | — | — | — | — | — | — | — |
| 1996 | Democracy: Release date: April 1, 1996; Label: Butterfly, Big Life | 71 | — | — | — | — | — | — | — |
| 2003 | Killing Joke: Release date: July 28, 2003; Label: Zuma, Epic, Columbia | 43 | — | 108 | 100 | — | — | — | — |
| 2006 | Hosannas from the Basements of Hell: Release date: April 3, 2006; Label: Cooking Vinyl | 113 | — | 173 | — | — | — | — | — |
| 2010 | Absolute Dissent: Release date: September 27, 2010; Label: Spinefarm | 71 | 37 | 113 | — | — | — | — | — |
| 2012 | MMXII: Release date: April 2, 2012; Label: Spinefarm | 44 | 9 | 134 | — | — | — | — | — |
| 2015 | Pylon: Release date: October 23, 2015; Label: Spinefarm | 16 | — | 98 | 70 | — | — | — | — |

=== Live albums ===
| Year | Album | Peak chart positions |
| Year | Album | UK |
|---|---|---|
| 1982 | The Unperverted Pantomime | |
| 1982 | Ha | 66 |
| 1989 | The Courtauld Talks | — |
| 1995 | BBC in Concert | — |
| 2001 | No Way Out But Forward Go! | — |
| 2005 | XXV Gathering: Let Us Prey | — |
| 2008 | The Original Unperverted Pantomime | — |
| 2008 | Live at the Forum | — |
| 2009 | Requiem | — |
| 2009 | The Gathering 2008 | — |
| 2011 | Down by the River | — |
| 2015 | Live at the Hammersmith Apollo 16.10.2010 Volume 1 | — |
| 2015 | Live at the Hammersmith Apollo 16.10.2010 Volume 2 | — |
| 2016 | The Great Gathering | — |
| 2018 | Laugh at Your Peril (Live At The Roundhouse, London) | — |
| 2018 | Laugh at Your Peril (Live in Berlin) | — |
| 2019 | Malicious Damage (Live at the Astoria) | — |
| 2021 | Total Invasion: Live in the USA | — |
| 2023 | Honour The Fire - Live At The Eventim Apollo Hammersmith | |
"—" denotes releases that did not chart or were not released in that country.

=== Compilation albums ===
| Year | Title |
|---|---|
| 1990 | An Incomplete Collection 1980-1985 |
| 1992 | Laugh? I Nearly Bought One! |
| 1995 | Wilful Days |
| 1996 | Alchemy – The Remixes: Note: Remix album |
| 1998 | Wardance – The Remixes: Note: Remix album |
| 2003 | The Unperverted Pantomime |
| 2004 | Chaos for Breakfast |
| 2004 | For Beginners |
| 2007 | Inside Extremities: Mixes, Rehearsals and Live |
| 2007 | Bootleg Vinyl Archive Vol. 1 |
| 2007 | Bootleg Vinyl Archive Vol. 2 |
| 2008 | Rmxd: Note: Remix album |
| 2008 | The Peel Sessions 1979-1981 |
| 2008 | Duende - The Spanish Sessions |
| 2013 | The Singles Collection 1979-2012 |
| 2014 | Killing Joke in Dub Vol 1: Note: Remix album |
| 2023 | Killing Joke In Dub Vol 2 |
| 2026 | Extremities - The Albini Demos and Live Recordings |

== Extended plays ==
| Year | Title |
|---|---|
| 1979 | Turn to Red: Release date: October 1979 |
| 1995 | Jana Live: Release date: February 1995; Additional information Label: Big Life, Butterfly; Format: CD; Track listing: 1. "Jana" – 5:19; 2. "Wardance" – 3:55; 3. "Exorcism" – 7:30; 4. "Kings and Queens" – 4:46 |
| 2010 | In Excelsis Additional information Label: Spinefarm; Format: CD; Track listing: 1. "In Excelsis" – 5:14; 2. "Endgame" – 4:39; 3. "Kali Yuga" – 3:52; 4. "Ghost of Ladbroke Grove" – 6:30; 5. "Ghost of Ladbroke Grove Dub" – 6:27 |
| 2020 | Turn To Red 12" 2020 |
| 2022 | Lord of Chaos: Release date: March 2022 |
| 2023 | Wardance/Pssyche 12" |

== Singles ==
| Year | Single | Peak chart positions | | | | | | | Album |
| Year | Single | UK | UK Sales | GER | IRE | NL | NZ | US Dance | Album |
|---|---|---|---|---|---|---|---|---|---|
| 1979 | "Nervous System" (Note: "Nervous System" charted on the UK Physical Singles Chart upon its reissue in 2013.) | — | 11 | — | — | — | — | — | Turn to Red |
| 1980 | "Wardance" (Note: "Wardance" charted on the UK Physical Singles Chart upon its reissue in 2023.) | — | 34 | — | — | — | — | 50 | Killing Joke |
| 1980 | "Change" | — | — | — | — | — | — | — | Killing Joke |
| 1980 | "Requiem" | — | — | — | — | — | — | 43 | Killing Joke |
| 1981 | "Follow the Leaders" | 55 | — | — | — | — | — | 25 | What's THIS For...! |
| 1982 | "Empire Song" | 43 | — | — | — | — | — | — | Revelations |
| 1982 | "Chop-Chop" | — | — | — | — | — | — | — | Revelations |
| 1982 | "Birds of a Feather" | 64 | — | — | — | — | — | — | Non-album song |
| 1983 | "Let's All Go (to the Fire Dances)" | 51 | — | — | — | — | — | — | Fire Dances |
| 1983 | "Me or You?" | 57 | — | — | — | — | — | — | Non-album song |
| 1984 | "Eighties" | 60 | — | — | — | — | — | — | Night Time |
| 1984 | "A New Day" | 56 | — | — | — | — | — | — | Non-album song |
| 1985 | "Love Like Blood" | 16 | — | 24 | 30 | 5 | 6 | — | Night Time |
| 1985 | "Kings and Queens" | 58 | — | — | — | — | — | — | Night Time |
| 1986 | "Adorations" | 42 | — | — | — | — | — | — | Brighter Than a Thousand Suns |
| 1986 | "Sanity" | 70 | — | — | — | — | — | — | Brighter Than a Thousand Suns |
| 1988 | "America" | 77 | — | — | — | — | — | — | Outside the Gate |
| 1988 | "My Love of This Land" | 89 | — | — | — | — | — | — | Outside the Gate |
| 1990 | "The Beautiful Dead" | — | — | — | — | — | — | — | Extremities, Dirt & Various Repressed Emotions |
| 1991 | "Money Is Not Our God" | — | — | — | — | — | — | — | Extremities, Dirt & Various Repressed Emotions |
| 1992 | "Change: The Youth Mixes" | 76 | — | — | — | — | — | — | Non-album song |
| 1994 | "Exorcism" | — | — | — | — | — | — | — | Pandemonium |
| 1994 | "Millennium" | 34 | 34 | — | — | — | — | — | Pandemonium |
| 1994 | "Pandemonium" | 28 | 28 | — | — | — | — | — | Pandemonium |
| 1995 | "Jana" | 54 | 54 | — | — | — | — | — | Pandemonium |
| 1996 | "Democracy" | 39 | 39 | — | — | — | — | — | Democracy |
| 1998 | "Love Like Blood/Intellect" | — | — | — | — | — | — | — | Non-album song |
| 2003 | "Loose Cannon" | 25 | 25 | — | — | — | — | — | Killing Joke 2003 |
| 2003 | "Seeing Red" | — | — | — | — | — | — | — | Killing Joke 2003 |
| 2006 | "Hosannas from the Basements of Hell" | 72 | 48 | — | — | — | — | — | Hosannas from the Basements of Hell |
| 2006 | "Invocation" | — | — | — | — | — | — | — | Hosannas from the Basements of Hell |
| 2011 | "European Super State" | — | 5 | — | — | — | — | — | Absolute Dissent |
| 2012 | "In Cythera" | — | 4 | — | — | — | — | — | MMXII |
| 2012 | "Corporate Elect" | — | 22 | — | — | — | — | — | MMXII |
| 2015 | "I Am the Virus" | — | 17 | — | — | — | — | — | Pylon |
| 2015 | "Euphoria" | — | — | — | — | — | — | — | Pylon |
| 2015 | "Dawn of the Hive" | — | — | — | — | — | — | — | Pylon |
| 2020 | "Turn to Red 2020" | — | 6 | — | — | — | — | — | Non-album song |
| 2020 | "Wardance (Liminal Twins Disorientation Mix)" | — | — | — | — | — | — | — | Non-album song |
| 2022 | "Lords of Chaos" | — | 1 | — | — | — | — | — | Non-album song |
| 2023 | "Full Spectrum Dominance" | — | — | — | — | — | — | — | Non-album song |
"—" denotes releases that did not chart.

== Videography ==
| Year | Title |
|---|---|
| 2002 | Rok ďábla/Year of the Devil (feat. Jaz Coleman) Released in the Czech Republic |
| 2003 | No Way Out But Forward Go!: Label: Import; Format: DVD |
| 2005 | XXV Gathering: The Band That Preys Together Stays Together: Label: Eagle Vision; Format: DVD |
| 2009 | Requiem (Live): Label: Charly; Format: CD+DVD |
| 2019 | Malicious Damage - Live at the Astoria 12.10.03: Label: Cadiz Music; Format: DVD |

== Music videos ==
| Year | Title | Director |
|---|---|---|
| 1983 | "Let's All Go (To the Fire Dances)" | Tony Van Den Ende |
| 1984 | "Eighties" | Tony Van Den Ende |
| 1984 | "A New Day" | |
| 1985 | "Love Like Blood" | Peter Care |
| 1985 | "Kings and Queens" | |
| 1986 | "Adorations" | |
| 1986 | "Sanity" | |
| 1988 | "America" | Ralph Ziman |
| 1991 | "Money Is Not Our God" | |
| 1994 | "Millennium" | Jon Klein |
| 1994 | "Pandemonium" | C.B. |
| 1996 | "Democracy" | Guy Guillet |
| 2003 | "Loose Cannon" | |
| 2003 | "Seeing Red" | Oblong Box |
| 2006 | "Hosannas from the Basements of Hell" | Petr Zelenka |
| 2011 | "European Super State" | Digital Beast |
| 2012 | "In Cythera" | Mike Coles |
| 2013 | "Corporate Elect" | Mikee Goodman |
| 2016 | "New Cold War" | Mike Coles |
| 2016 | "Euphoria" | |
| 2023 | "Full Spectrum Dominance" | |
