= Laugh? I Nearly Bought One! =

1992 compilation album by Killing Joke

Compilation album by Killing Joke
- Released: 5 October 1992
- Recorded: 1979–1990
- Genre: Post-punk; industrial rock; gothic rock; new wave
- Length: 79:19
- Label: Caroline; Virgin
- Producer: Killing Joke, Conny Plank, Chris Kimsey, Martin Rex

Killing Joke compilation album chronology
Laugh? I Nearly Bought One! (1992)	Wilful Days (1995)

Laugh? I Nearly Bought One! is the first major compilation album by English post-punk band Killing Joke, released in October 1992 by Caroline Records in the U.S. and by Virgin Records in the U.K. and Europe.

== Content ==
Every studio album up to the time of release is represented, except Fire Dances and Outside the Gate. Three non-album tracks are also included, along with the original Chris Kimsey mix of "Wintergardens" from Brighter than a Thousand Suns, which was previously unreleased at the time.

The album's cover image of a priest blessing Nazi soldiers was previously used by the band for a concert poster in the early 1980s. Because of its theme, it caused quite a stir and the band were banned from playing a concert in Glasgow, Scotland. Contrary to popular belief, the priest in the picture was not Pope Pius XII, but German Nazi abbot Albanus Schachleiter.

== Reception ==
Professional ratings
Review scores
Source	Rating
AllMusic	4.5/5 stars
The Encyclopedia of Popular Music	3/5 stars
MusicHound Rock	3.5/5 stars
Select	4/5 stars

Ned Raggett of AllMusic wrote, "not the best compilation that could have been assembled [...] Laugh? is still a reasonable overview of the first decade of Killing Joke and its checkered but still important history". Trouser Press called the album "commendable", but "a few obscure tracks take the place of more essential choices".

== Track listing ==
No.	Title	Writer(s)	Length
1.	"Turn to Red" (from Turn to Red)	Jaz Coleman, Kevin "Geordie" Walker, Martin "Youth" Glover, Paul Ferguson	4:01
2.	"Pssyche (Live)" (from Ha!)	Coleman, Walker, Glover, Ferguson	4:44
3.	"Requiem" (from Killing Joke)	Coleman, Walker, Glover, Ferguson	3:43
4.	"Wardance" (from Killing Joke)	Coleman, Walker, Glover, Ferguson	3:45
5.	"Follow the Leaders" (from What's THIS For...!)	Coleman, Walker, Glover, Ferguson	4:54
6.	"Unspeakable" (from What's THIS For...!)	Coleman, Walker, Glover, Ferguson	5:18
7.	"Butcher" (from What's THIS For...!)	Coleman, Walker, Glover, Ferguson	6:10
8.	"Exit" (from What's THIS For...!)	Coleman, Walker, Glover, Ferguson	3:39
9.	"The Hum" (from Revelations)	Coleman, Walker, Glover, Ferguson	4:56
10.	"Empire Song" (from Revelations)	Coleman, Walker, Glover, Ferguson	3:17
11.	"Chop-Chop" (from Revelations)	Coleman, Walker, Glover, Ferguson	4:17
12.	"Sun Goes Down" (from Birds of a Feather EP)	Coleman, Walker, Paul Raven, Ferguson	4:17
13.	"Eighties" (from Night Time)	Coleman, Walker, Raven, Ferguson	3:49
14.	"Darkness Before Dawn" (from Night Time)	Coleman, Walker, Raven, Ferguson	5:18
15.	"Love Like Blood" (from Night Time)	Coleman, Walker, Raven, Ferguson	4:23
16.	"Wintergardens (Previously Unreleased Mix)" (original version from Brighter than a Thousand Suns)	Coleman, Walker, Raven, Ferguson	4:47
17.	"Age of Greed" (from Extremities, Dirt and Various Repressed Emotions)	Coleman, Walker, Martin Atkins	7:26

== Personnel ==
- Jaz Coleman – vocals, synthesizer
- Kevin "Geordie" Walker – guitar
- Martin "Youth" Glover – bass guitar on tracks 1 and 3–11
- Paul Raven – bass guitar on tracks 2 and 12–17
- Paul Ferguson – drums, vocals on tracks 1–16
- Martin Atkins – drums, vocals on track 17
- Mike Coles - cover design
