= Ha (Killing Joke album) =

Live album by Killing Joke
- Released: 4 November 1982
- Recorded: 9–10 August 1982
- Genre: Post-punk; industrial rock
- Length: 26:35
- Label: E.G.
- Producer: Conny Plank, Killing Joke

Killing Joke live albums chronology
Ha (1982)	BBC in Concert (1995)

Professional ratings
Review scores
Source	Rating
AllMusic	3.5/5 stars

"Ha" or "Ha": Killing Joke Live is the first commercially distributed live recording by English post-punk band Killing Joke. It was recorded at Larry's Hideaway in Toronto, Ontario, Canada on 9 and 10 August 1982 by producer Conny Plank, and released on 4 November by E.G. Records. Rob O'Connor did the artwork for the album.

== Release ==
Ha was originally released on 4 November 1982, in 10-inch and cassette EP formats, by E.G. Records. It reached number 66 in the UK Albums Chart.

It was re-released on CD in 2005 by Virgin Records, with three bonus tracks taken from Killing Joke's 1982 single, Birds of a Feather.

== Track listing ==
All tracks are written by Jaz Coleman, Paul Ferguson, Martin Glover and Kevin "Geordie" Walker

No.	Title	Length
1.	"Pssyche"	4:47
2.	"Sun Goes Down"	3:53
3.	"The Pandys Are Coming"	3:54

Side B
No.	Title	Length
1.	"Take Take Take"	4:56
2.	"Unspeakable"	5:19
3.	"Wardance"	3:46

CD reissue bonus tracks, from the Birds of a Feather single
No.	Title	Length
7.	"Sun Goes Down"	4:18
8.	"Birds of a Feather"	3:46
9.	"Flock the B-Side"	3:46

== Personnel ==
Killing Joke

- Jaz Coleman – vocals, synthesizer
- Kevin "Geordie" Walker – guitar
- Paul Raven – bass guitar
- Paul Ferguson – drums, vocals

== Charts ==
Year	Chart	Peak position
1982	UK Albums Chart	66
