= Kings and Queens (Killing Joke song) =

1985 single by Killing Joke

Single by Killing Joke

from the album Night Time
- A-side: "Kings and Queens"
- B-side: The Madding Crowd (Remixed by Killing Joke)
- Released: 22 March 1985
- Genre: Post-punk
- Length: 13:29
- Label: E.G. Records; Polydor
- Songwriter(s): Jaz Coleman; Kevin "Geordie" Walker; Paul Raven; Paul Ferguson
- Producer(s): Killing Joke; Chris Kimsey

Killing Joke singles chronology
"Love Like Blood" (1985)	"Kings and Queens" (1985)	"Adorations" (1986)

"Kings and Queens" is Killing Joke's third single from their fifth studio album, Night Time. It was originally released by E.G. Records on 22 March 1985 as a 7" and 12" single in the UK, and a 7" single by Polydor in the Netherlands. It was produced by Chris Kimsey. Although "Kings and Queens" was overshadowed by the success of Killing Joke's previous single, "Love Like Blood", it did reach number 58 in the UK Singles Chart.

== Track listings ==
The B-side to the single was a dub remix of the song "Multitudes" from Night Time, titled "The Madding Crowd (Remixed by Killing Joke)". The 12" single featured the dub mix "Kings and Queens (A Right Royal Mix)" as its A-side, with the original included on the B-side.

=== 7" single ===
Side A

1. "Kings and Queens" – 03:35

Side B

1. "The Madding Crowd (Remixed by Killing Joke)" – 05:05

=== 12" single ===
Side A

1. "Kings and Queens (A Right Royal Mix)" – 04:52

Side B

1. "The Madding Crowd (Remixed by Killing Joke)" – 05:05
2. "Kings and Queens" – 03:35

== Charts ==
Chart (1985)	Peak position
UK Singles (OCC)	58
