= Love Like Blood =

Love Like Blood may refer to:

- "Love Like Blood" (song), a 1985 song by Killing Joke
- Love Like Blood (band), a German rock band
