= The Damage Manual =

UK musical group

- Origin: London, England
- Genres: Industrial, industrial rock
- Years active: 2000–2005; 2012
- Label: Invisible Records
- Spinoffs: Pigface, Killing Joke, Public Image Ltd, Murder, Inc., Hate Dept., Sheep on Drugs
- Past members: Jah Wobble; Chris Connelly; Martin Atkins; Geordie Walker; Lee Fraser; Steven Seibold
- Website: thedamagemanual.com

The Damage Manual were an English industrial supergroup formed in London in 2000. The band initially featured Martin Atkins (Pigface/Killing Joke) on drums and loops, Chris Connelly (Revolting Cocks) on vocals, Geordie Walker (Killing Joke) on guitar, Jah Wobble (Public Image Ltd) on bass, and Lee Fraser (Sheep on Drugs) on keyboards. Atkins, Walker, and Connelly were previously in the early 1990s supergroup Murder, Inc. as well. A second lineup in 2004 featured Atkins, Connelly, and Steven Seibold (Hate Dept.).

== History ==
Originally stemming from discussions between Martin Atkins and Jah Wobble, Geordie Walker was brought aboard when Wobble expressed interest in working with him. After writing and arranging material through exchanging recordings from their own respective studios, the trio had put together a batch of instrumental ideas in need of a vocalist. It was rumored that the trio first approached vocalist John Lydon (Public Image Ltd/Sex Pistols) for an amicable resurgence (both Atkins and Wobble did notable work in Public Image Ltd), but he declined the opportunity. Atkins and Walker had both worked with vocalist/songwriter Chris Connelly during the early 1990s in the supergroup Murder, Inc., and thus Connelly joined The Damage Manual. Lee Fraser of Sheep on Drugs also originally played keyboards with the band. During the Damage Manual's initial recording sessions, Fraser departed from the band (although his contributions remained on the band's eventual releases).

The Damage Manual initially released the mini-album One in April 2000. It consisted of seven songs. The band quickly followed it up with a self-titled album in September of that same year. Both One and The Damage Manual were on Atkins' own Invisible Records label. The group dissolved after a US tour which did not include Wobble, who was reported as not being interested in touring with the band, although he had played on the UK leg of the tour. Invisible Records later released a combined reissue of One and The Damage Manual as Double Damage in 2002, followed by the remix album Damaged: The Remixes in 2003.

In 2004, a resurrected Damage Manual without Walker and Wobble found Steven Seibold of the band Hate Dept. providing guitar and bass. The revised band released the full-length record Limited Edition in 2005. It was to be followed by a headlining tour; however, that was canceled due to a series of emergencies within Atkins' family. A subsequent tour with Pigface and Sheep on Drugs also in 2005 was also canceled, this time due to Connelly's illness. A DVD compilation of studio recordings, interviews, and more (simply titled The Damage Manual) was released in 2008. In 2012, Atkins and Connelly reunited to perform a short set as the Damage Manual. Their performance occurred at the yearly industrial/electronic festival Cold Waves.

== Members ==
- Martin Atkins – drums, loops (2000–2005, 2012)
- Chris Connelly – vocals (2000–2005, 2012)
- Geordie Walker – guitar (2000–2003)
- Jah Wobble – bass (2000–2003)
- Lee Fraser – keyboards, programming (2000)
- Steven Seibold – guitar, bass (2004–2005)

== Discography ==
=== Studio albums ===
- One (2000)
- The Damage Manual (2000)
- Limited Edition (2005)

=== Remix albums ===
- Damaged: The Remixes (2003)
- Damaged Dubs (2006)

=== Compilations ===
- Double Damage (2002)

=== DVDs ===
- The Damage Manual (2008)
