= Birds of a Feather (Killing Joke song) =

Song by Killing Joke

Single by Killing Joke
- A-side: "Birds of a Feather"
- B-side: "Flock the B-Side"
- Released: 22 October 1982
- Genre: Post-punk
- Length: 7:32
- Label: E.G., Polydor
- Songwriters: Jaz Coleman, Kevin "Geordie" Walker, Paul Raven, Paul Ferguson
- Producers: Killing Joke, Conny Plank

Killing Joke singles chronology
"Chop-Chop" (1982)	"Birds of a Feather" (1982)	"Let's All Go (to the Fire Dances)" (1983)

"Birds of a Feather" is a single by English post-punk band Killing Joke. It was released as a 7" and 12" single in October 1982 by E.G. Records in the UK, Polydor in the Netherlands and E.G. and Passport Records in the US. The 12" release also included the track "Sun Goes Down". The single reached No. 64 in the UK Singles Chart.

The single was Killing Joke's first release with new bass guitarist Paul Raven. Its musical style was more melodic than their previous albums, a direction that continued with the album "Fire Dances" and the non-album singles "Me or You?" (1983) and "A New Day" (1984).

== Track listing ==
The B-side to all releases was "Flock the B-side", a dub remix of the title track.

7" Single

Side A
No.	Title	Length
1.	"Birds of a Feather"	3:46

Side B
No.	Title	Length
1.	"Flock the B-Side"	3:46

12" Single

Side A
No.	Title	Length
1.	"Birds of a Feather"	3:46
2.	"Sun Goes Down"	4:19

Side B
No.	Title	Length
1.	"Flock the B-Side"	3:46

== Charts ==
Year	Chart	Peak position
1982	United Kingdom (UK Singles Chart)	64

Year	Chart	Peak position
1983	Spain (Los 40 Principales)	33
