= Nervous System (song) =

Song by Killing Joke

Single by Killing Joke

from the album Turn to Red (EP)
- B-side: "Turn to Red"
- Released: 30 November 1979
- Genre: Post-punk
- Length: 8:20
- Label: Island
- Songwriter(s): Jaz Coleman, Kevin "Geordie" Walker, Martin "Youth" Glover, Paul Ferguson
- Producer(s): Killing Joke

Killing Joke singles chronology
"Nervous System" (1979)	"Wardance" (1980)

Alternate cover

"Nervous System" is a song by English post-punk band Killing Joke. It was released in 1979 by Island Records as the band's debut single, shortly after the release of their Turn to Red EP.

== Release ==
"Nervous System" originally appeared on the band's debut EP, Turn to Red. It was then released in December 1979 on 7" vinyl by Island Records as the band's debut single. Both promo and non-promo versions of the single were released by Island Records with different cover art. The non-promo featured the same album cover as the Almost Red EP, while the promo featured an Island Records factory cover. The single did not chart.

== Track listing ==
7"

Side A

1. "Nervous System" – 4:10

Side B

1. "Turn to Red" – 4:10

12"

Side A

1. "Almost Red"
2. "Nervous System"

Side B

1. "Are you Receiving"
2. "Turn to Red"
