= Night Time (album) =

1985 studio album by Killing Joke

Studio album by Killing Joke
- Released: 25 February 1985
- Recorded: August–September 1984
- Studio: Hansa (West Berlin)
- Genre: Gothic rock; post-punk
- Length: 39:54
- Label: E.G.; Polydor
- Producer: Killing Joke; Chris Kimsey

Killing Joke chronology
Fire Dances (1983)	Night Time (1985)	Brighter Than a Thousand Suns (1986)

Singles from Night Time
- 1. "Eighties" Released: 30 March 1984; 2. "Love Like Blood" Released: 25 January 1985; 3. "Kings and Queens" Released: 22 March 1985

Night Time is the fifth studio album by the English post-punk band Killing Joke, released on 25 February 1985 by E.G. through Polydor Records and produced by Chris Kimsey. It entered the UK Albums chart on 9 March 1985 at number 11, their highest position to date and it stayed nine weeks in that chart. The track "Love Like Blood", released as a single in January 1985, was a top 20 hit on the UK singles chart.

== Background and recording ==
Most of Night Time was written in Geneva, Switzerland. The band had felt they needed a change in 1983 and went to live there for a while. Singer Jaz Coleman wrote the lyrics of "Eighties" and "Love like Blood" there.

The album was recorded across five weeks in August and September 1984 at Hansa Tonstudio in West Berlin. The band felt that Berlin was a "cold place" which suited the material. Producer Chris Kimsey sought to replicate the sound and feel of the band playing live, and exercised restraint during the mixing process; the group described him as a "true engineer". Coleman felt in retrospect that he was unstable and unbalanced during the sessions.

== Release and promotion ==
Ahead of the release of the album, the band performed three songs live on the UK TV show The Tube on 25 January 1985: "Night Time", "Love Like Blood" and "Kings and Queens".

Night Time was released in late February 1985 by E.G. Records through Polydor. It was an international hit, reaching number 11 in the United Kingdom in its first week on 9 March, number 8 in New Zealand and number 50 in Sweden.

The album was remastered and reissued on CD in 2008 with nine bonus tracks, including 1984 Kid Jensen BBC radio sessions, the non-album single "A New Day" and the previously unreleased complete version of "Blue Feather" (previously only available in an instrumental remix as the B-side to "Love Like Blood").

== Critical reception ==
Professional ratings
Review scores
Source	Rating
AllMusic	4.5/5 stars
The Encyclopedia of Popular Music	3/5 stars
PopMatters	9/10
MusicHound Rock	4/5 stars
Select	4/5 stars
Smash Hits	5/10

Night Time generally received a favourable critical response. Retrospectively, PopMatters opined that the band had "perfected" their "balance between antagonism and accessibility" on the album, and were "simply on fire on this record". Ned Raggett of AllMusic commented that the album found the band "caught between their earlier aggression and a calmer, more immediately accessible approach".

== Legacy ==
Nirvana adapted the guitar riff from "Eighties" for their song "Come as You Are".

== Track listing ==
All tracks are written by Killing Joke (Jaz Coleman, Paul Ferguson, Geordie Walker, Paul Raven), except as noted.

Side one
No.	Title	Length
1.	"Night Time"	4:58
2.	"Darkness Before Dawn"	5:22
3.	"Love Like Blood"	6:50
4.	"Kings and Queens"	4:41

Side two
No.	Title	Length
1.	"Tabazan"	4:36
2.	"Multitudes"	4:59
3.	"Europe"	4:38
4.	"Eighties"	3:51

2008 CD reissue bonus tracks
No.	Title	Writer(s)	Length
9.	"Eighties" (Kid Jensen Session, 17/04/84)		2:53
10.	"New Culture" (Kid Jensen Session, 17/04/84)		3:12
11.	"Blue Feather" (Kid Jensen Session, 17/04/84)		4:33
12.	"All Play Rebel" (Kid Jensen Session, 17/04/84)		3:23
13.	"A New Day"	Coleman; Ferguson; Chris Kimsey; Raven; Walker	4:23
14.	"The Madding Crowd"		5:10
15.	"Blue Feather" (Joke Mix)		3:59
16.	"Love Like Blood" (Gestalt Mix)		5:10
17.	"Kings and Queens" (Geordie's Dub Mix)		5:00

== Personnel ==
Killing Joke

- Jaz Coleman – vocals, keyboards
- Kevin "Geordie" Walker – guitar
- Paul Raven – bass guitar
- Paul Ferguson – drums, vocals

Production and artwork

- Chris Kimsey – production, mixing
- Brian McGhee – engineering
- Thomas Stiehler – engineering
- Jeff Veitch – photography
- Rob O'Connor – sleeve design
- Alex Zander – crew
- Brad Nelson – crew
- Fil. E. – crew

== Charts ==
Chart (1985)	Peak position
New Zealand Albums Chart	8
Swedish Albums Chart	50
UK Albums Chart	11

Chart (2025)	Peak position
Greek Albums (IFPI)	77
