= What's THIS For...! =

Studio album by Killing Joke
- Released: 22 June 1981
- Recorded: Late December 1980 to February 1981
- Studios: Townhouse Studios, London
- Genres: Post-punk; industrial rock
- Length: 42:04
- Labels: E.G., Polydor
- Producers: Killing Joke, Nick Launay

Killing Joke chronology
Killing Joke (1980)	What's THIS For...! (1981)	Revelations (1982)

Singles from What's THIS For...!
- 1. "Follow the Leaders" Released: May 1981

What's THIS For...! is the second studio album by English post-punk band Killing Joke, released on 22 June 1981 by E.G. via Polydor Records.

== Recording ==
Like Killing Joke's debut album, What's THIS For...! was self-produced by the band. It was engineered by Hugh Padgham and Nick Launay. Launay, Padgham's assistant at that time, finished the album after an altercation that resulted in damage to the mixing desk, causing Padgham to leave before the album was mixed. Launay continued to work under the band's direction. Padgham contradicts the mixing desk incident saying that Jaz's recollection is "all rubbish. The thing is they were so out of it."

== Release ==
What's THIS For...! was released in June 1981 by E.G. Records. It entered the UK Albums Chart at number 51 on 20 June and peaked at number 42 on 4 July.

A remastered version with three bonus tracks was released in 2005.

== Music ==
Josh Jackson of Paste Magazine said the album's style was "as much post-metal as post-rock."

== Reception ==
Professional ratings
Review scores
Source	Rating
AllMusic	4/5 stars
The Austin Chronicle	3/5 stars
Robert Christgau	B
The Encyclopedia of Popular Music	3/5 stars
MusicHound Rock	3.5/5 stars
Select	4/5 stars
Sounds	5/5 stars

What's THIS For...! was generally well received by critics. In a 5 out 5 star review, John Gill of Sounds wrote: "it's an album of incomparable verve, energy and aggression, and you might even risk a dalliance with the slumming glamour of its violence. NME hailed the album, saying: "In its own terms, What's THIS For...! is an excellent record - even if those terms are the most hopeless ones to be found in rock today. It's the same wardance as before, slightly better realised." Trouser Press described the album as "nearly as terrific" as their debut album, "bringing funk to ambient music, implying feeling sublimated in a chaotic world".

A significant contemporary dissent came from Melody Maker, whose Adam Sweeting called the album "a tired and very noisy collection of ripoffs", and deemed the whole effort "unlistenable ... apart from the spaces between the tracks".

In a 2016 review, Paste Magazine's Josh Jackson listed the album at No. 48 on his list of "The 50 Best Post-Punk Albums". He said the band "laid the groundwork for an industrial music revolution," and noted "the real genius here is the human emotion that comes through such spare efficiency." The Pensive Quill's Christopher Owens calls this "...the greatest album ever made."

== Artwork ==
The image of the photograph was taken at 88 Colegate in Norwich, though only the left-hand side is visible.

== Track listing ==
All tracks are written by Killing Joke (Jaz Coleman, Paul Ferguson, Martin Glover and Geordie Walker).

Side A
No.	Title	Length
1.	"The Fall of Because"	5:12
2.	"Tension"	4:33
3.	"Unspeakable"	5:20
4.	"Butcher"	6:11

Side B
No.	Title	Length
1.	"Follow the Leaders"	5:37
2.	"Madness"	7:43
3.	"Who Told You How?"	3:37
4.	"Exit"	3:42

2005 CD reissue bonus tracks
No.	Title	Length
9.	"Follow the Leaders" (Dub)	4:06
10.	"Madness" (Dub)	7:28
11.	"Brilliant"	3:58

The 1981 cassette featured the titles "This Is Madness" and "It's Very Nice (Unspeakable!)" instead of "Madness" and "Unspeakable", respectively.

== Personnel ==
Killing Joke

- Jaz Coleman – vocals, synthesizer, production
- Kevin "Geordie" Walker – guitar, production
- Martin "Youth" Glover – bass guitar, production
- Paul Ferguson – drums, vocals, production

Technical

- Hugh Padgham – recording engineer (uncredited)
- Nick Launay – recording engineer, mixing (uncredited)
- Mike Coles – sleeve design (uncredited)

== Charts ==
Year	Chart	Peak position
1981	UK Albums Chart	42
