= Elan Sicroff =

Pianist

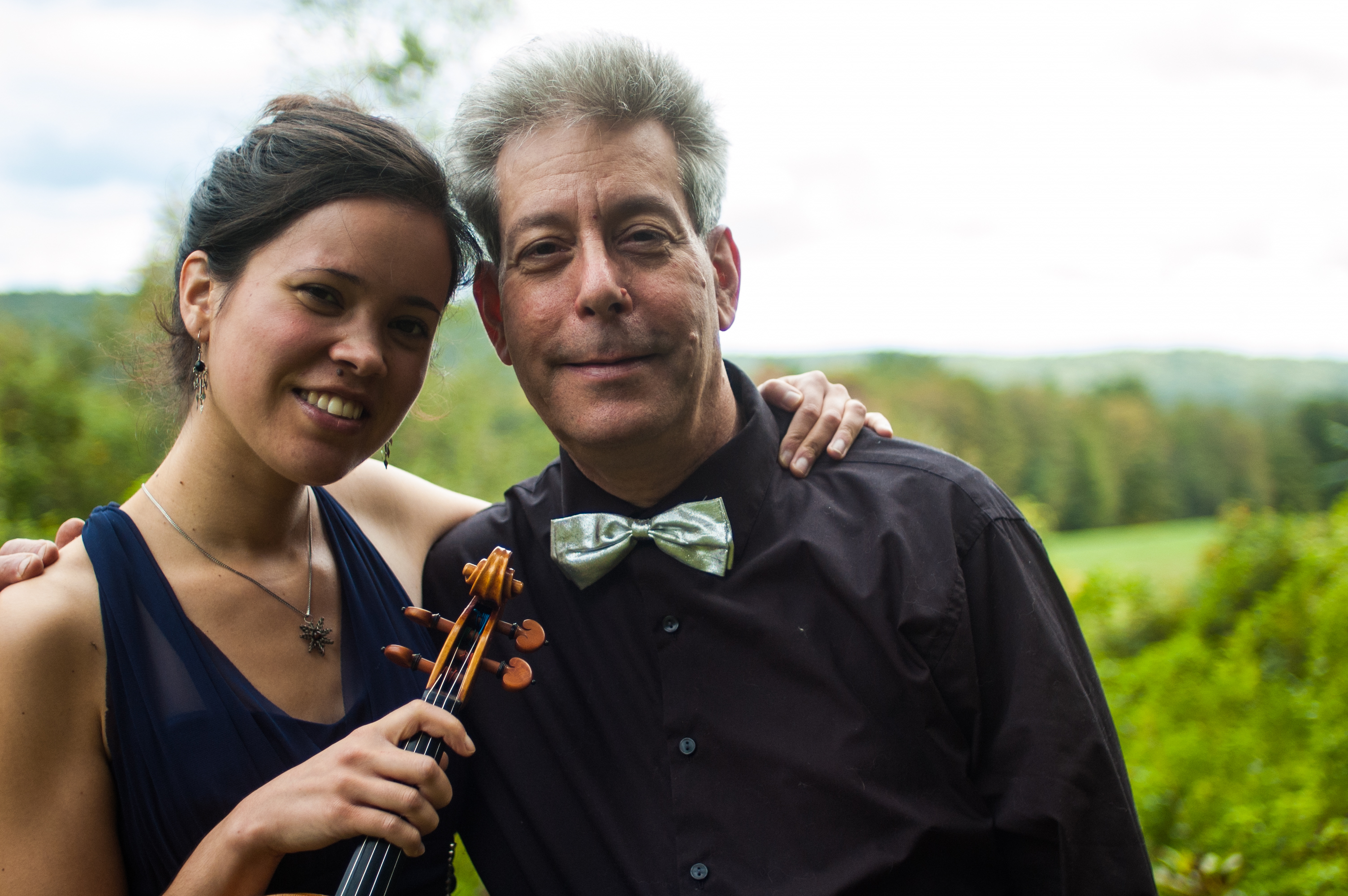
- Katharina Paul & Elan Sicroff 2011
- Occupation: Pianist
- Years active: 1982–present
- Website: sicroff.com

Elan David Sicroff (born March 20, 1950) is a concert pianist, recording artist, and educator. He interprets the music composed by Thomas de Hartmann (1885–1956) and the spiritualist George Gurdjieff (1866 or 1867–1949).

== Early life and education ==
As a teen, Sicroff trained as a classical pianist at the Juilliard Preparatory School under Jeaneane Dowis, specializing in the Hungarian composer Béla Bartók. "When I first found Bartók’s music, I was 14," he recalled in a 2010 interview. "My teacher gave me the Three Rondos on Folk Tunes, from Hungary. I was at the Juilliard Preparatory School, and I needed something modern for the final exam of my first year there. I played it through once and I didn’t understand it. The second time, I was addicted. For years, I was playing only Bartók."

He later studied at the Oberlin Conservatory. He attended the International Academy for Continuous Education in Sherborne, UK, directed by John G. Bennett, one of the leading exponents of Gurdjieff's teachings.

From 1975 to 1979 he trained with Mme. Olga de Hartmann, the composer's widow. About his training with Mme. de Hartmann, Sicroff said, "Her greatest interest in the interpretation and performance of her husband’s music was that feeling should be transmitted through it. She was unimpressed by fingers running up and down the keyboard, and she would sometimes say things that would irritate me. She would say that none of the pianists on the world stage really played with feeling. This was very hard for me to accept, and it took many years for it to really become clear to me, just what she was talking about."

== Career ==
In 1982, Sicroff undertook a concert tour of the US, introducing de Hartmann's neglected works to a wider audience.

Sicroff has performed at London’s Wigmore Hall, Carnegie Recital Hall in New York, Bulgaria's National Academy of Music, and Madrid's Muzeum Hudby, as well as with the Santa Fe Symphony. He has also performed at McGill University, Bowdoin College, the University of California, Los Angeles, Smith College, the University of California, Berkeley, Boston's Longy School of Music, the Berklee College of Music, and the Royal Irish Academy of Music in Dublin, Ireland.

He lives in the Netherlands.

=== The Thomas de Hartmann Project ===
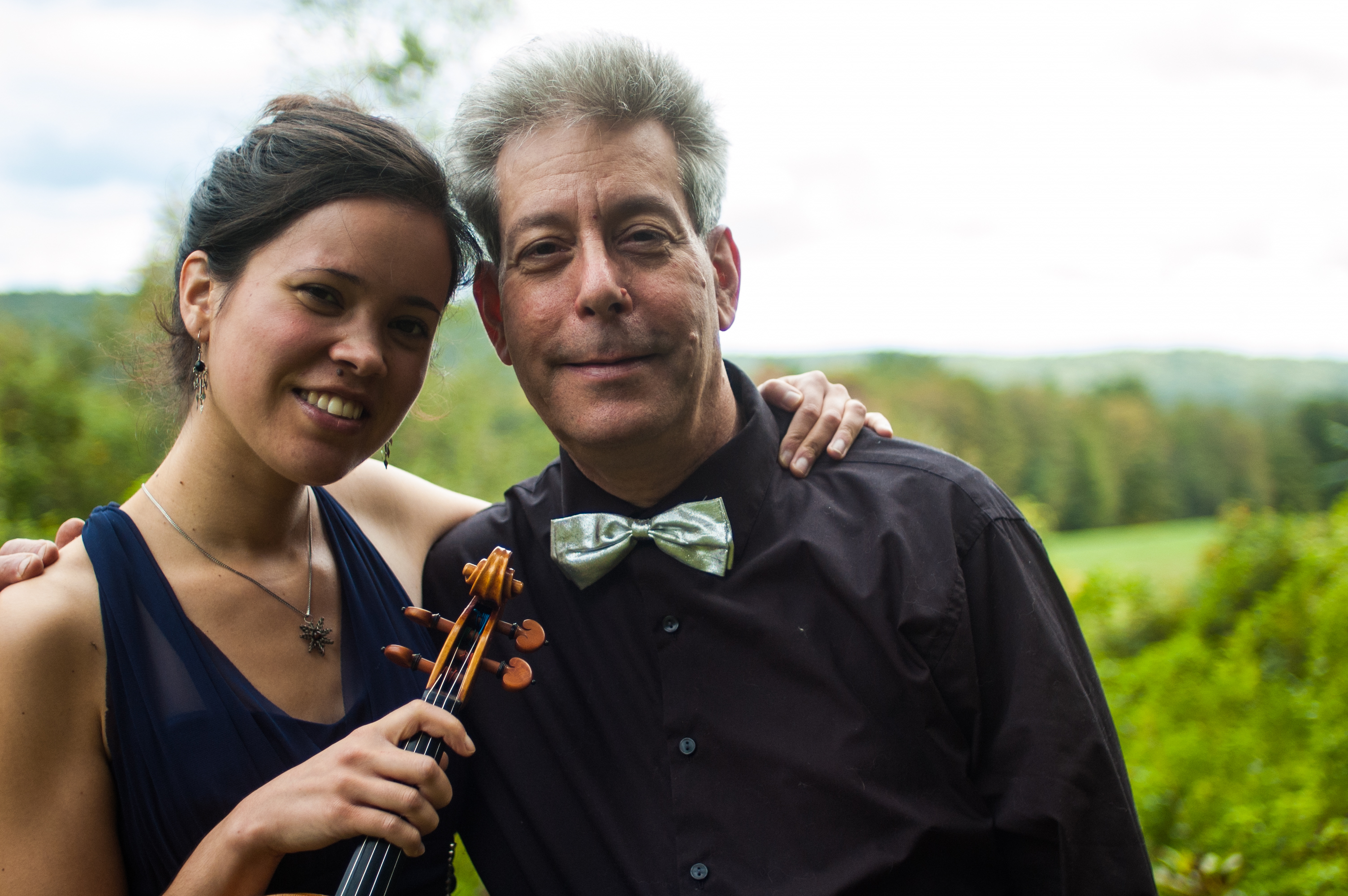
Violinist Katharina Paul and Elan Sicroff, Warwick, Massachusetts, 2011

Between 1918 and 1927, De Hartmann and Gurdjieff co-composed a repertoire of sacred music, which has remained in circulation; however, de Hartmann's catalog of classical music has been largely overlooked. In 2006, guitarist Robert Fripp (of the band King Crimson), an adherent of the teachings of Gurdjieff and an admirer of de Hartmann's music, proposed that Sicroff take on the task of bringing the Russian composer's music back into concert halls. "Fripp said to me, 'If you don’t get this music known, nobody is going to do it,'" said Sicroff. "The Gurdjieff music is safe. Many, many people are playing the Gurdjieff now. It’s the de Hartmann classical music that is still sitting under a rock." For this purpose, the Thomas de Hartmann Project was conceived. Thomas Daly, the executor of the estate of Olga and Thomas de Hartmann, approved the project, and permitted de Hartmann's unpublished works to be distributed and performed.

A recording project, begun in the Netherlands in 2011 and produced by Gert-Jan Blom, artistic director of the Metropole Orkest, was completed in 2016. A seven-CD set, The Thomas de Hartmann Project, featuring Sicroff (with accompanists) performing the composer's solo piano, chamber and vocal works, will be released on the Basta Music label in September 2016.

Sicroff has performed de Hartmann’s music in performance with violinist Juliette Zeelander, cellist Anneke Janssen and soprano Nina Lejderman. He has also performed de Hartmann's Violin Sonata Op. 51 with violinist Katharina Paul. In addition, Sicroff has programmed a lecture-recital which chronicles the composer’s life and work with live performance, recordings, and photos.

=== Discography ===
Sicroff has released three albums:

- Journey to Inaccessible Places and Other Music (produced by Robert Fripp; recorded 1985, released 1987 on the Editions E.G. label)
- Sicroff Plays Gurdjieff (2002);
- Laudamus: The Music of Georges Ivanovitch Gurdjieff and Thomas de Hartmann (2009, a selection of Gurdjieff/de Hartmann collaborations and three early romantic works composed by de Hartmann in his teens).
