= Love Like Blood (band) =

German gothic rock/gothic metal band

- Origin: Germany
- Genres: Gothic rock; dark wave; hard rock; gothic metal
- Years active: 1989–2001, 2010, 2011
- Labels: Deathwish Office; Hall of Sermon
- Members: Yorck Eysel; Gunnar Eysel

Love Like Blood was a German gothic rock band. The band's name comes from the song of the same name by English post-punk band Killing Joke.

== Biography ==
Its nucleus consists of the Eysel brothers Yorck (vocals, lyrics) and Gunnar (bass). The band was active from 1989 to 2001 and is now on (indefinite) hiatus.

Its early sound reminisces the style of Fields of the Nephilim. They made their breakthrough with the 1992 album An Irony of Fate, which marked the debut of English guitarist Mark Wheeler. This album showcased a transition to a more hard rock-influenced style.

In the mid-1990s, Love Like Blood turned to gothic metal with the album Exposure.

On their 2000 album, Enslaved + Condemned, Love Like Blood made a rendition of Youssou N'Dour and Neneh Cherry's song "Seven Seconds", giving the pop song a more ragged, metal-oriented sound.

In January 2010, it was announced that Love Like Blood would be performing live for the "first and only" time since 1999 at the Twentieth Anniversary Wave-Gotik-Treffen festival in Leipzig. However, they played one more show on 23 July 2011 in Kortrijk, Belgium.

== Discography ==
=== Albums ===
- Flags of Revolution (1990)
- An Irony of Fate (1992)
- Odyssee (1994)
- Exposure (1995)
- Snakekiller (1998)
- Enslaved+Condemned (2000)
- Chronology of a Love Affair (2001)

=== Compilation albums ===
- Sinister Dawn / Ecstasy (1992)
- Swordlilies - The Decade of Love Like Blood (1997)

=== Singles ===
- "Sinister Dawn" (1989)
- "Ecstasy" (1991)
- "Kiss & Tell" (1992)
- "Demimondes" (1992)
- "Flood of Love" (1993)
- "Heroes" (1993)
- "Stormy Visions" (1993)
- "Taste of Damocles" (1997)
- The Love Like Blood E.P. (1998)
- "Love Kills" (2000)
