= Pylon (Killing Joke album) =

Studio album by Killing Joke
- Released: 23 October 2015
- Recorded: Vada Studios (Worcestershire, England); The Lair (Bath, England); The Doghouse Studio (Oxfordshire, England); The Hive (Prague, Czech Republic)
- Genres: Industrial metal; post-punk
- Length: 57:03
- Labels: Spinefarm; Universal
- Producers: Tom Dalgety, Killing Joke

Killing Joke chronology
MMXII (2012)	Pylon (2015)	Lord of Chaos (2022)

Pylon is the fifteenth studio album by English post-punk band Killing Joke, released on 23 October 2015 by Spinefarm Records, distributed worldwide by Universal Music Group. The album was recorded in the UK and the Czech Republic and co-produced by the band and Tom Dalgety. It was preceded by the release of "I Am the Virus" and "Euphoria" was subsequently released as the album's second single. Jaz told biographer Jyrki "Spider" Hämäläinen that it was their Cold War album. This is the band's last studio album with guitarist Geordie Walker, before his death in 2023, as well as the band's final studio album to feature the original line-up.

== Reception ==
Professional ratings
Aggregate scores
Source	Rating
Metacritic	77/100
Review scores
Source	Rating
AllMusic	3.5/5 stars
Consequence of Sound	C
Drowned in Sound	8/10
Exclaim!	9/10
Kerrang!	4/5 stars
Mojo	4/5 stars
PopMatters	8/10
Q	3/5 stars
Record Collector	4/5 stars
Uncut	4/5 stars

Pylon has received a rating of 77/100 based on eleven reviews on review aggregator website Metacritic.

AllMusic wrote: "Pylon doesn't sound terribly innovative within the band's body of work, but the album's widescreen sound and bone-fracturing impact leave no doubt that Killing Joke are still deeply committed to what they do, and it's genuinely remarkable that they're still sounding this furious and effective 35 years after their debut album."

Pylon peaked at the No. 16 position on the UK Albums Chart, thus it became the third-highest charting album of the band's career (tied with 1994's Pandemonium). Pylon ranked at No. 10 in Rolling Stone's list of the "20 Best Metal Albums of 2015".

== Track listing ==
All tracks are written by Killing Joke (Jaz Coleman, Paul Ferguson, Youth and Geordie Walker).

No.	Title	Length
1.	"Autonomous Zone"	6:43
2.	"Dawn of the Hive"	6:28
3.	"New Cold War"	6:51
4.	"Euphoria"	4:16
5.	"New Jerusalem"	6:10
6.	"War on Freedom"	4:40
7.	"Big Buzz"	5:02
8.	"Delete"	5:00
9.	"I Am the Virus"	5:38
10.	"Into the Unknown"	6:15
Total length:		57:03

Limited deluxe edition bonus disc
No.	Title	Length
1.	"Apotheosis"	6:25
2.	"Plague"	5:50
3.	"Star Spangled"	5:30
4.	"Panopticon"	8:45
5.	"Snakedance" (Youth 'Rattlesnake Dub' Remix)	7:55

== Personnel ==
Killing Joke

- Jaz Coleman – vocals, keyboards
- Kevin "Geordie" Walker – guitars
- Martin "Youth" Glover – bass, programming
- Paul Ferguson – drums

Technical

- Tom Dalgety – recording engineer, programming, mixing
- Amak Golden – recording engineer, programming
- Michael Rendall – recording engineer, additional programming
- Bert Neven – recording engineer
- Joe Jones – additional engineering & programming
- Reza Udhin – additional engineering & programming
- Jamie Grashion – additional engineering & programming
- Edward Banda – additional engineering & programming
- Tom Barnes – band photography
- Mike Coles – cover design
