= The Courtauld Talks =

Live album by Killing Joke
- Released: 1989
- Recorded: 19 September 1987
- Venue: The Courtauld Institute, London
- Genre: Spoken word; acoustic
- Label: Invisible

Killing Joke chronology
Outside the Gate (1988)	The Courtauld Talks (1989)	Extremities, Dirt and Various Repressed Emotions (1990)

Professional ratings
Review scores
Source	Rating
AllMusic	3/5 stars

The Courtauld Talks is a live album by English post-punk band Killing Joke, released in 1989 by Invisible Records. It is different from the group's other releases in that it is essentially a spoken-word album.

== Content ==
On 19 September 1987, frontman Jaz Coleman delivered a lecture at London's Courtauld Institute, outlining the thinking behind the band's then-unreleased Outside the Gate album, expounding on its origins in gematria and the occult. Fellow Killing Joke member Geordie Walker (on acoustic guitar) and Outside the Gate session musician Jeff Scantlebury (on percussion) provided a minimal, repetitive musical backing. The venue itself was an apt place for the lecture as it specialised in arts and conservation.

== Release ==
A recording of the lecture was released as The Courtauld Talks, a double vinyl LP on Killing Joke drummer Martin Atkins' Invisible Records in 1989. A CD version was released in July 1997.

== Track listing ==
1. "The Courtauld Talks" – 66:22

== Personnel ==
Killing Joke

- Jaz Coleman – voice
- Kevin "Geordie" Walker – acoustic guitar

Additional personnel

- Jeff Scantlebury – percussion

Technical

- Martin Rex - live sound & recording engineer
- Phil Le Gonidec - crew
