= A New Day (song) =

1984 single by Killing Joke

Single by Killing Joke
- A-side: "A New Day"
- B-side: "Dance Day"
- Released: July 1984
- Genre: Post-punk
- Length: 8:28
- Label: E.G. Records
- Songwriters: Jaz Coleman; Kevin "Geordie" Walker; Paul Raven; Paul Ferguson; Chris Kimsey
- Producers: Killing Joke; Chris Kimsey

Killing Joke singles chronology
"Eighties" (1984)	"A New Day" (1984)	"Love Like Blood" (1985)

7" B-Side
- A New Day Side B Inner Sleeve

"A New Day" is a single by English post-punk band Killing Joke. It was released by E.G. Records in July 1984 as a 7-inch and 12-inch single. The B-side to the 7" release was a remix of the song, named "Dance Day". The single reached No. 51 in the UK Singles Chart. A promotional video was filmed for the song, the first time the band made a video for a non-album single.

The song was later included on the 2008 reissue of Night Time. "Dance Day" was later included on the compilation "Wilful Days" (mistakenly titled "A New Day").

== Reception ==
Muriel Gray at Smash Hits said, "A very dated guitar riff announces the fact that we're not to expect anything new from Killing Joke in this latest release. They're apparently attempting to sound threatening and raw, but the band have always been a little bit guilty of being pantomime punks, and this just reinforces that pastiche."

== Track listings ==
The 7-inch single featured "Dance Day" as the B-side. The 12" single featured a dub mix of "A New Day" as its A-side and the original track as the B-side. A 7" release in Portugal used a shorter edit of "A New Day" instead.

=== 7" vinyl single ===
Side A

1. "A New Day" – 04:08

Side B

1. "Dance Day" – 03:40

=== 12" vinyl single ===
Side A

1. "A New Day (Dub Mix)" – 04:20

Side B

1. "A New Day" – 04:08

== Charts ==
Year	Chart	Peak Position
1984	UK Singles Chart	56
