= Empire Song =

Song by Killing Joke

Single by Killing Joke

from the album Revelations
- B-side: "Brilliant"
- Released: March 1982
- Genre: Post-punk, gothic rock
- Length: 7:19
- Label: E.G.
- Songwriters: Jaz Coleman, Kevin "Geordie" Walker, Martin "Youth" Glover, Paul Ferguson
- Producers: Killing Joke, Conny Plank

Killing Joke singles chronology
"Follow the Leaders" (1981)	"Empire Song" (1982)	"Chop-Chop" (1982)

Empire Song is a song by English post-punk band Killing Joke. It was released in 1982 by E.G. Records as the first single from their third studio album, Revelations.

== Production and release ==
By 1982, members of Killing Joke, especially singer Jaz Coleman, had become immersed in the occult, particularly the works of Aleister Crowley. In February of that year, Coleman moved to Iceland to survive the apocalypse, which Coleman predicted was coming soon.

"Empire Song" was released in March 1982 by E.G. Records as the first single from the band's third studio album, Revelations. Polydor also released "Empire Song" as a single in Ireland. It reached No. 43 in the UK Singles Chart that same month. As a result of Coleman moving to Iceland, "Empire Song" was performed at Top of the Pops with drummer Paul Ferguson on vocals. Because Coleman was absent, a dummy was placed in front of a keyboard, while the other three members played.

Guitarist Kevin "Geordie" Walker and bassist Martin "Youth" Glover followed Coleman and moved to Iceland later that year. There, Coleman and Walker worked with musicians from the band Þeyr in the project Niceland. After a few months, Youth decided there was no indication of the apocalypse, and moved back to England. Youth then began the band Brilliant with Ferguson, but the latter defected and traveled to Iceland to rejoin Killing Joke with new bassist Paul Raven (previously of Neon Hearts and the rock/glam band Kitsch) in tow. After spending some time in Iceland, Killing Joke returned to England and began touring and recording.

== Track listing ==
Side A

1. "Empire Song" – 03:19

Side B

1. "Brilliant" – 04:00

== Charts ==
Year	Chart	Peak Position
1982	UK Singles Chart	43
