= MMXII (Killing Joke album) =

Studio album by Killing Joke
- Released: 2 April 2012
- Recorded: 2011
- Studios: The Doghouse Studio (Oxfordshire, England); Studio Faust (Prague, Czech Republic)
- Genres: Industrial metal, post-punk
- Length: 50:47
- Labels: Spinefarm; Universal
- Producer: Killing Joke

Killing Joke chronology
Absolute Dissent (2010)	MMXII (2012)	Pylon (2015)

Singles from MMXII
- 1. "In Cythera" Released: 19 March 2012

MMXII ("2012" in Roman numerals) is the fourteenth studio album by English post-punk band Killing Joke, released on 2 April 2012, by Spinefarm Records, which was distributed worldwide by Universal Music Group.

== Recording and production ==
We don't know if we're all gonna be here next year, we really don't. So let's celebrate!

— Jaz Coleman

Following up the 2010 release of Absolute Dissent, Killing Joke's original lineup of Jaz Coleman, Geordie Walker, Martin "Youth" Glover, and Paul Ferguson worked on the new album in 2011, writing and recording about twenty-six tracks, mainly at The Doghouse Studio, Oxfordshire, England. The album, produced by the band, was programmed, engineered, mixed by Clive Goddard, Tom Dalgety, Michael Rendall, with additional work by Reza Udhin at Studio Faust Records in Prague, Czech Republic. Making guitar overdubs were avoided.

== Content ==
=== Music ===
This year is about getting our collective dreams in order, restoring the biosphere, the idea of well-being as opposed to economic growth, the idea of partnership and co-creation with fellow human beings, moving away from national boundaries and more towards what Schiller and Beethoven were saying in some of their work.

— Jaz Coleman

MMXII is a dense and dark end-of-time album that explores the 2012 phenomenon with political, anti-establishment and forward-looking themes, which is also able to find moments of optimism and hope, and positive light in the fields of environmentalism, reforestation, permaculture and the dawning of the Age of Aquarius. The industrial rock album's compositions are characterized by Walker's guitar riffs, Youth's warm and vibrant bass guitar, Ferguson's impeccable timing and by Coleman's sweet harmonies mixed with rants.

The opening track of the album, "Pole Shift", is about environmental concerns and the possibility and the need of a potentially rapid shifts in the relative positions of the geographic locations of the poles and the axis of rotation of the Earth. This nine-minute track, which starts with a cascading symphony made up by electric bass guitar and synthesizers, is marked by Walker's guitar scaling and Coleman's mix of introspectively delivered verses and dark chorus. The second track, "Fema Camp", is a five-minute song with tribal rhythms and incendiary vocals that was inspired by the prison-like facilities built around the United States by the U.S. Federal Emergency Management Agency (FEMA) that could be used during martial law for the internment of citizens who are deemed a threat to U.S. national security.

'Rapture' is the way I perceive a Killing Joke concert – it's a spiritual experience for myself to get into that state of grace... music is the theme of mantra. I'm not into organized religion at all, but I've always liked what Fela Kuti did in Nigeria, playing music like it was a temple. Maybe we will evolve into a time where we will be performing for ritualistic and spiritual reasons alone and not for monetary reasons?

— Jaz Coleman

"Rapture", the third track on the album and the first song that was made available for free listening, is Coleman's vision of Killing Joke's concerts, comparing them to a spiritual experience. The song, arranged in the industrial metal music style of their 2006's album Hosannas from the Basements of Hell, was inspired by Fela Kuti and his Kalakuta Republic commune in Nigeria. The fourth track, "Colony Collapse", deals with the current global situation and its prospects in the near future. "Corporate Elect", the fifth track on the album, is about the greed in the business world whose rules are defined by the top corporations. The seventh track, "Primobile", is a self-referential piece about the band's members internal interactions. Both "Primobile" and "Corporate Elect" are in the industrial endeavor of reuniting a more direct punk and metal crossover.

The lead single and sixth track of the album, "In Cythera" is an optimistic synthpop-influenced song reminiscent of "Adorations" and the band's sound in the mid-1980s. Cythera, to which the lyrics of the song probably refer, is an island in Greece located at the south-western exit from the Aegean Sea, opposite to the south-eastern tip of the Peloponnese peninsula behind Cape Maleas. This island was also the inspiration for many artists such as Italian early Renaissance painter Sandro Botticelli for his painting The Birth of Venus, as well as for other similarly themed paintings that show the goddess Venus arriving at the shore of Cythera, for French Rococo painter Antoine Watteau's painting Embarkation for Cythera and French Modernist poet Charles Baudelaire's poem "A Voyage to Cythera", in which the poet called the island a "banal El Dorado". The penultimate track, "Trance", has a rumbling bass line mirroring that of early song "Pssyche" and an abrasive guitar. The closing track, "On All Hallow's Eve", is about Coleman's belief in ancestor worship supported by quantum theories that there is no death, bringing the album to a natural close.

=== Album cover ===
The album cover was designed by graphic artist and Killing Joke's long-time collaborator Mike Coles. It depicts the profile of a skull and a machine, both suspended in the air, and a devastated landscape in the background.

== Release ==
A track from the album, "Rapture", was made available for listening in February 2012. The music video for "In Cythera", the first single from the album, was uploaded to the Killing Joke Vevo YouTube channel on 6 March. The single itself was made available to purchase on 19 March as a limited and numbered 12″ coloured vinyl, and as a CD featuring "Penny Drops" as an exclusive and unreleased track. "Corporate Elect" was released as the second single from the album, available on iTunes on 01/12/2012 with an extended version of "On All Hallow's Eve" as the b-side.

MMXII was released as a CD, a double coloured vinyl and as a downloadable Internet album via iTunes with "New Uprising" as an exclusive track on 2 April through the UK subsidiary of Spinefarm Records, and was distributed worldwide by Universal Music Group. It reached number 44 in the UK Albums Chart. It was preceded by a UK tour and followed by a European tour.

== Reception ==
Professional ratings
Aggregate scores
Source	Rating
Metacritic	75/100
Review scores
Source	Rating
Blabbermouth	4/5 stars
Classic Rock	4.5/5 stars
Drowned in Sound	8/10
Kerrang!	4/5 stars
Metal Hammer	4.5/5 stars
Mojo	4/5 stars
Record Collector	4/5 stars
Rolling Stone	4/5 stars
Sputnikmusic	4.5/5
Terrorizer	4/5 stars

MMXII was very well received by critics. Tom Bryant in the March issue of the UK-based music magazine Kerrang! rated MMXII described it as an "[a]pocalyptic death disco from seminal post-punks". British magazine Classic Rock in its March issue gave the album a rating of 9 out of 10, stating that "[i]t's the end of the world as we know it. But what a way to go."

The music website Sputnikmusic described it as "an end-of-times album full of carnage, disarray, paranoia... and just a little bit of hope", depicting MMXII as an album that "marks one of Killing Joke's greatest achievements, dating all the way back to their inception in 1978." Dom Gourlay of the UK-based music webzine Drowned in Sound wrote: "[t]he sound of a band still in their creative prime, MMXII is everything Killing Joke have proclaimed themselves to be these past three-and-a-half decades, and fifteen albums on is just as incisive and coarse as their debut."

== Track listing ==
All tracks are written by Killing Joke (Jaz Coleman, Paul Ferguson, Youth, and Geordie Walker).

No.	Title	Length
1.	"Pole Shift"	8:56
2.	"Fema Camp"	5:02
3.	"Rapture"	4:15
4.	"Colony Collapse"	5:04
5.	"Corporate Elect"	4:00
6.	"In Cythera"	4:29
7.	"Primobile"	4:44
8.	"Glitch"	4:48
9.	"Trance"	6:09
10.	"On All Hallow's Eve"	3:21
Total length:		50:52

iTunes exclusive bonus track
No.	Title	Length
11.	"New Uprising"	6:09

== Personnel ==
Killing Joke

- Jaz Coleman – vocals, synthesizer, production, cover design
- Kevin "Geordie" Walker – guitar, production, cover design
- Martin "Youth" Glover – bass guitar, synthesizer, production, cover design
- Paul Ferguson – drums, production, cover design

Technical

- Clive Goddard – recording engineer, mixing
- Tom Dalgety – recording engineer, programming, mixing
- Michael Rendall – recording engineer
- Reza Udhin – engineering, programming
- Mike Coles – cover design

== Charts ==
Chart (2012)	Peak position
Finnish Album Chart	9
French Albums Chart	134
UK Albums Chart	44
