= Eighties (song) =

1984 single by Killing Joke

Single by Killing Joke

from the album Night Time
- B-side: "The Coming Mix"
- Released: 30 March 1984
- Genre: Post-punk
- Length: 3:51
- Label: E.G.
- Songwriters: Jaz Coleman; Paul Ferguson; Paul Raven; Kevin Walker
- Producers: Killing Joke; Chris Kimsey

Killing Joke singles chronology
"Me or You?" (1983)	"Eighties" (1984)	"A New Day" (1984)

Music video
- "Eighties" on YouTube

"Eighties" is the lead single from the English post-punk band Killing Joke's fifth studio album, Night Time (1985), produced by Chris Kimsey. The song had been premiered during a three track live performance for UK TV show The Tube in December 1983. Upon its release, the single reached No. 60 in the UK singles chart.

A short snippet of "Eighties" was the opening theme to the 2002 sitcom That '80s Show. It was used for a party scene in the 1985 movie Weird Science. It is also used as the theme song for the Investigation Discovery series The 1980s: The Deadliest Decade. It was also used as the music at the closing credits of Season 1, Episode 6, "Bent", of The Lincoln Lawyer.

== Critical reception ==
A retrospective review of AllMusic said: "Guitarist Geordie Walker shines on "Eighties," playing cyclical and repetitive riffs, each one a variation or inversion of the song's main theme, and each one a hook unto itself".

== Release ==
The studio version was released in late March 1984 by E.G. Records as a 12-inch and 7-inch single. The 12-inch single A-side featured the track "Eighties (Serious Dance Mix)" with "Eighties" and "Eighties (The Coming Mix)" as B-sides. The 7-inch single exempted the "Serious Dance Mix" and instead, featured "Eighties" as the A-side. Also, the 7-inch single was sold with a bonus 7-inch single of "Let's All Go (to the Fire Dances)".

== Music video ==
The official 1984 music video to "Eighties" was directed by Anthony Van Den Ende, and shows the band performing the song while frontman Jaz Coleman stands in front of a microphone stand which has the U.S. flag draped over it. Behind him the flag of the Soviet Union can be seen. Their performance is intercut with stock footage of Margaret Thatcher, Ronald Reagan, Leonid Brezhnev (with the footage deliberately skipping), Anwar Sadat, Pope John Paul II, Ruhollah Khomeini, Konstantin Chernenko and John DeLorean. Other footage shows a space shuttle being launched, nuclear bomb explosion, a female bodybuilding contest, a group of punks at a concert in Hammersmith, book burnings, Beatles albums being burned after the "bigger than Jesus" comment and a dog wedding.

== Conflict with Nirvana ==
The song "Come as You Are", by American grunge band Nirvana, featured a riff similar to "Eighties". Nirvana and their management company, Gold Mountain, were unsure about releasing the song as a single from their 1991 studio album, Nevermind. Danny Goldberg, head of Gold Mountain, later revealed that "we couldn't decide between 'Come as You Are' and 'In Bloom.' Kurt [Cobain] was nervous about 'Come as You Are' because it was too similar to a Killing Joke song but we all thought it was still the better song to go with. And, he was right, Killing Joke later did complain about it". Nirvana biographer Everett True wrote that "Come as You Are" was eventually chosen for release as a single because "Goldberg favoured the more obviously commercial song".

After Nirvana released the single in 1992, members of Killing Joke claimed the main guitar riff of "Come as You Are" plagiarized the riff of "Eighties", but according to Rolling Stone magazine, they did not file a copyright infringement lawsuit because of "personal and financial reasons". However, conflicting reports, such as Kerrang!, have stated differently.

Cobain's death in 1994 effectively dissolved Nirvana and the conflict with Killing Joke. If there was a lawsuit filed as Kerrang! claimed, it was either thrown out of court, or it was dropped to take the burden off the remaining members of Nirvana and their management. However, the court that supposedly took the case was not named and many doubted that Killing Joke ever filed a lawsuit against Nirvana.

An interview with Killing Joke guitarist Geordie Walker that same year confirmed the possibility of a lawsuit along these lines, thus proving that the claim by Kerrang! was not fabricated. Walker stated:

We were very pissed off about that, but it's obvious to everyone. We had two separate musicologists' reports saying it was. Our publisher sent their publisher a letter saying it was and they went 'Boo, never heard of ya!', but the hysterical thing about Nirvana saying they'd never heard of us was that they'd already sent us a Christmas card!

Nine years later, in 2003, Nirvana drummer Dave Grohl took a leave of absence from his current band, the Foo Fighters, to record drums for Killing Joke's second self-titled album. The move surprised some Nirvana fans, given Nirvana's past conflict with Killing Joke. However, Foo Fighters had previously recorded a cover of another Killing Joke song, "Requiem", as a B-side to their 1997 single "Everlong."

AllMusic writer Bill Janovitz reviewed "Eighties", comparing and contrasting "Come as You Are" and "Eighties":

While 'Eighties' unflinchingly displays the band's aggressive punk rock roots—cold and hard to mirror the socio-political message—it also embraces dance-music grooves and a certain sort of melodic sensibility. One main, perhaps, crucial difference between the bands is that while Kurt Cobain practiced whisper-to-a-scream vocal dynamics, Killing Joke's Jaz Coleman was almost always full-on in his approach, with a terrifying growl of a voice that is similar to that of Motörhead's Lemmy.

However, The Big Takeover magazine's Jack Rabid reported that Captain Sensible's "Life Goes On", recorded by The Damned for their 1982 album, Strawberries, "features the exact same, extremely unique riff as both 'Eighties' and 'Come as You Are'". Coleman and Paul Ferguson separately claimed to have no knowledge of this.

== Track listings ==
=== 7-inch vinyl single ===
Side A

1. "Eighties" – 03:35

Side B

1. "Eighties (The Coming Mix)" – 03:33

=== 12-inch vinyl single ===
Side A

1. "Eighties (Serious Dance Mix)" – 06:02

Side B

1. "Eighties" – 03:35
2. "Eighties (The Coming Mix)" – 03:33

== Charts ==
Chart (1984)	Peak Position
UK Singles (OCC)	60
