= Follow the Leaders =

Single by Killing Joke

from the album What's THIS For...!
- B-side: "Follow the Leaders (Dub)", "Tension"
- Released: May 1981
- Genre: Post-punk
- Length: 14:02
- Label: E.G., Malicious Damage
- Songwriters: Jaz Coleman, Kevin "Geordie" Walker, Martin "Youth" Glover, Paul Ferguson
- Producer: Killing Joke

Killing Joke singles chronology
"Requiem" (1980)	"Follow the Leaders" (1981)	"Empire Song" (1982)

7" Italian release
- Side A

Alternative cover
- Side B

"Follow the Leaders" is a song by the English post-punk band Killing Joke. It was released in May 1981 by E.G. Records as the only single from the band's second studio album, What's THIS For...!.

== Release ==
"Follow the Leaders" was backed by the B-sides "Follow the Leaders (Dub)" and "Tension". It reached No. 55 in the UK Singles Chart in May 1981 and No. 25 in the Billboard Hot Dance Club Songs.

A 7" single was released by Polydor in Italy and E.G. Records in Spain, each with a different version of "Follow the Leaders" from the 10".

== Track listing ==
7"
Side A

1. "Follow the Leaders" – 4:05

Side B

1. "Tension" – 4:27

10"
Side A

1. "Follow the Leaders" – 5:30

Side B

1. "Follow the Leaders (Dub)" – 4:04
2. "Tension" – 4:28

== Charts ==
Chart (1981)	Peak Position
UK Singles Chart	55
U.S. Billboard Hot Dance Club Songs	25
