= Extremities, Dirt and Various Repressed Emotions =

Studio album by Killing Joke
- Released: 20 November 1990
- Recorded: August 1990
- Studio: Townhouse Studios, London
- Genre: Industrial rock; post-punk; industrial metal; gothic rock
- Length: 65:08
- Label: Noise
- Producer: Killing Joke; Martin Rex

Killing Joke chronology
The Courtauld Talks (1989)	Extremities, Dirt and Various Repressed Emotions (1990)	Pandemonium (1994)

Singles from Extremities, Dirt and Various Repressed Emotions
- 1. "Money Is Not Our God" Released: January 1991

Extremities, Dirt and Various Repressed Emotions is the eighth studio album by English post-punk band Killing Joke, released in November 1990 by Noise Records. After the commercial failure of their previous album Outside the Gate in 1988, singer Jaz Coleman and guitarist Geordie Walker were the last remaining members of the group. In December 1988, they recruited new musicians to perform a one-off concert in Porchester and premiered new songs, including early versions of "Extremities" and "The Beautiful Dead". The band didn't have any support of a record company anymore: Virgin had fired them and their label E.G. sued them. Coleman stated that it was a very stressful period of time for him and Walker. The new material was more intense, the band performed it live during a US tour in 1989. Extremities, Dirt and Various Repressed Emotions was recorded in 1990 for a German independent label: bassist Paul Raven was called back before entering into the studio. Drummer Martin Atkins, formerly of Public Image Ltd and Ministry, had joined the band in 1988 and co-composed the songs with Coleman and Walker.

"Money Is Not Our God" was the leading single of the album. The new line-up toured extensively to support the album in 1991.

== Content ==
=== Musical style ===
Extremities, Dirt and Various Repressed Emotions saw a return to prominent guitars after the synthesised sound on previous album Outside the Gate. Trouser Press wrote, "Perhaps inspired by all the new industrial bands aping their early style, Killing Joke reformed for a tour, demonstrating new resolve to recapture the old formula", describing it as having "all the intoxicating intensity and righteous fury missing from Outside the Gate mated to a timelier Ministry-like feel." It was recorded shortly after Jaz Coleman's Arabic-influenced album with The Art of Noise's Anne Dudley, Songs from the Victorious City.

The chorus riff from "Intravenous" would be reprised in 2006's "Majestic" and 2012's "Glitch".

=== Artwork ===
The eyes on the cover of the album belong to actor Conrad Veidt, as featured in the 1920 German film The Cabinet of Dr. Caligari. The top pair is original, the other three are upside down, and the cover for the cassette version shows all four pairs original.

The back of the CD bears two Latin phrases: the first, "hoc volo, sic iubeo, sit pro ratione voluntas", means: "I wish it, I command it. Let my will take the place of a reason", and was quoted from Roman poet Juvenal; the second, "semper imitatum nunquam idem", means: "always imitated, never replicated".

== Release ==
Extremities, Dirt and Various Repressed Emotions was released in November 1990 by the German label Noise Records.

It was re-released on 15 October 2007 by Candlelight Records in three editions: double LP, normal CD and a Deluxe Edition with a CD and a dual disc.

"Money Is Not Our God" was the only single released from the album, and failed to chart.

The double LP edition features the track "Age of Greed (Live)" as a bonus, whereas both CD reissues also feature four tracks from a very rare 1989 cassette demo. One of these tracks, "Jubilation", is actually an early version of "The Beautiful Dead" and had been released previously on a flexi disc. Of the other tracks, only "The Fanatic" was known, having been performed live at several concerts in 1989. The Deluxe Edition featured all bonus tracks on a separate dual disc, with the DVD side containing the music video for "Money Is Not Our God".

== Reception ==
Professional ratings
Review scores
Source	Rating
AllMusic	3/5 stars
Collector's Guide to Heavy Metal	7/10
The Encyclopedia of Popular Music	4/5 stars
MusicHound Rock	4/5 stars
NME	8/10

In his retrospective review, Ned Raggett of AllMusic wrote that the album "[recaptures] the sprawling spirit of the early days" of the band.

== Track listing ==
All tracks are written by Jaz Coleman, Geordie Walker and Martin Atkins

No.	Title	Length
1.	"Money Is Not Our God"	5:15
2.	"Age of Greed"	7:23
3.	"The Beautiful Dead"	6:02
4.	"Extremities"	5:20
5.	"Intravenous"	7:02
6.	"Inside the Termite Mound"	7:49
7.	"Solitude"	5:02
8.	"North of the Border"	5:52
9.	"Slipstream"	7:07
10.	"Kaliyuga"	2:08
11.	"Struggle"	6:13

2007 CD reissue bonus tracks
No.	Title	Length
12.	"The Party" (Demo)	5:09
13.	"The Fanatic" (Demo)	4:22
14.	"Solitude" (Demo)	5:10
15.	"Jubilation" (Demo)	4:37
16.	"Age of Greed" (Live)	12:05

Cassette version

Side A
No.	Title	Length
1.	"Money Is Not Our God"	5:26
2.	"Age of Greed"	6:49
3.	"The Beautiful Dead"	5:41
4.	"Extremities"	5:16
5.	"Intravenous"	6:58

Side B
No.	Title	Length
1.	"Inside the Termite Mound"	8:03
2.	"Solitude"	4:56
3.	"North of the Border"	5:59
4.	"Slipstream"	7:05
5.	"Kaliyuga-Struggle"	8:18

== Personnel ==
Killing Joke

- Jaz Coleman - vocals, keyboards, production
- Kevin "Geordie" Walker - guitar, production
- Paul Raven - bass guitar (tracks 1–11), production
- Dave "Taif" Ball - bass guitar (tracks 12–16), production
- Martin Atkins - drums, vocals, production

Additional personnel

- John Bechdel - programming, sampler (tracks 1–11)
- Dave Kovacevic - synthesizer (track 16)

Technical

- Martin Rex (as J.M. Rex) - production, engineering, mixing
- Michael Butterworth - engineering assistance
- Dominic Robson - engineering assistance
- Shawn Cymbalisty - engineering assistance (Marcus Studios)
- Geoff Pryce - technical engineer (Marcus Studios)
- Malcolm Haywood - photography
- Birgit Nielsen - artwork
- Henni Hell - artwork
- Paul Raven - art direction
