= Revelations (Killing Joke album) =

Studio album by Killing Joke
- Released: April 1982
- Studio: Conny's Studio, Wolperath, Cologne, Germany
- Genre: Post-punk; industrial rock; gothic rock
- Length: 37:24
- Label: E.G., Polydor
- Producer: Conny Plank

Killing Joke chronology
What's THIS For...! (1981)	Revelations (1982)	Fire Dances (1983)

Singles from Revelations
- 1. "Empire Song" Released: March 1982; 2. "Chop-Chop" Released: June 1982

Revelations is the third studio album by English post-punk band Killing Joke, released in April 1982 by E.G. via Polydor Records. It was recorded in Cologne, Germany and produced by Conny Plank, making it their first album not to be self-produced. Since bassist Youth departed from the band after the album's release, Revelations was the band's last album to feature the original line-up (until their 2010 album Absolute Dissent).

== Release ==
Revelations was released in April 1982 by E.G. Records. It reached number 12 in the UK Albums Chart. Youth was disappointed the way the album turned out, as it later contributed to him leaving the band, saying "It came out a bit dirgy".

Two singles were released from the album: "Empire Song" and "Chop-Chop". "Empire Song" was performed on Top of the Pops, but without singer Jaz Coleman, who had departed for Iceland fearing nuclear holocaust at the time. "Chop-Chop" suffered the same fate as "Empire Song". At the band's performance on Top of the Pops, the "Fake Coleman" keyboardist was used again with drummer Paul Ferguson as singer. At this time, frontman Jaz Coleman was the only member of Killing Joke to have moved to Iceland. However, by the end of the year, the other three members also moved to Iceland to avoid the Apocalypse, as predicted by Coleman.

A remastered version was released in 2005, including an alternate recording of "We Have Joy".

== Reception ==
Professional ratings
Review scores
Source	Rating
AllMusic	3/5 stars
The Austin Chronicle	3.5/5 stars
Drowned in Sound	5/5
The Encyclopedia of Popular Music	3/5 stars
MusicHound Rock	3/5 stars
Select	3/5 stars

Revelations has generally received mixed-to-favourable reception by critics. Nick Lancaster of Drowned in Sound praised the album, calling it "a less individual work – record company pressures and an outside producer necessarily toning down the band's nihilistic excesses – but it's all the better for it." Christopher Gray of The Austin Chronicle called it "faster" and "sleeker" than previous albums. Fact put the album at no. 11 on their list titled "20 Best: Goth Records Ever Made". In negative retrospective reviews, AllMusic believed the album had a "lack of cohesion and direction", while Trouser Press wrote that it "suffers from an uninvolving lethargy".

== Track listing ==
All tracks are written by Killing Joke (Jaz Coleman, Paul Ferguson, Youth and Geordie Walker).

Side A
No.	Title	Length
1.	"The Hum"	4:58
2.	"Empire Song"	3:19
3.	"We Have Joy"	2:56
4.	"Chop-Chop"	4:19
5.	"The Pandys Are Coming"	4:27

Side B
No.	Title	Length
1.	"Chapter III"	3:13
2.	"Have a Nice Day"	3:13
3.	"Land of Milk and Honey"	2:38
4.	"Good Samaritan"	3:28
5.	"Dregs"	4:57

2005 CD reissue bonus track
No.	Title	Length
11.	"We Have Joy" (Alternate Mix)	4:21

== Personnel ==
Killing Joke

- Jaz Coleman – vocals, synthesizer
- Kevin "Geordie" Walker – guitar
- Martin "Youth" Glover – bass guitar
- Paul Ferguson – drums, vocals

Technical

- Conny Plank – recording engineer, mixing, production
- Rob O'Connor – sleeve design

== Charts ==
Chart (1982)	Peak position
UK Albums Chart	12
New Zealand	33
