= Love Like Blood (song) =

1985 single by Killing Joke

Single by Killing Joke

from the album Night Time
- B-side: "Blue Feather (Version)"
- Released: 25 January 1985
- Genre: Gothic rock; post-punk; new wave
- Length: 6:50 (album); 4:14 (single/video)
- Label: E.G.; Polydor
- Songwriters: Jaz Coleman; Paul Ferguson; Paul Raven; Kevin Walker
- Producers: Killing Joke; Chris Kimsey

Killing Joke singles chronology
"A New Day" (1984)	"Love Like Blood" (1985)	"Kings and Queens" (1985)

Love Like Blood (Gestalt Mix)
- Love Like Blood (Gestalt Mix) side A snner sleeve

"Love Like Blood" is a song by English rock band Killing Joke. Described by guitarist Geordie Walker as "disco with distorted guitar", the song was released on 25 January 1985 as the second single from their fifth studio album, Night Time (1985). Produced by Chris Kimsey, the song is characterised as gothic rock and new wave. It was a top 10 hit in the Netherlands, Belgium and New Zealand and peaked at number 16 in the United Kingdom.

"Love Like Blood" was originally released by E.G. Records in January 1985 as a 7" and 12" single in the UK and various other European markets.

The song remains very fondly remembered in the Netherlands and in Belgium, as it has appeared on the former country's annual Top 2000 songs of all time countdown every year since 2011. Its highest position was No. 554 in 2000.

== Track listings ==
The single release was a shorter edit of "Love Like Blood" than the full album track. The 12" single featured an extended mix, titled "Love Like Blood (Version)" as its A-side. An alternative 12" release, limited to 2000 copies, replaced this with a dub remix, known as the "Gestalt Mix". "Blue Feather (Version)" was featured as the B-side; an instrumental mix of a song that was otherwise unreleased, until the complete version was included on the re-issue of Night Time in 2008.

In 1998, "Love Like Blood" was reissued as a live remix 12" single by Butterfly Records, alongside a remix of the song "Intellect" from Killing Joke’s 11th studio album, Democracy.

=== 7" vinyl single ===
Side A

1. "Love Like Blood" – 04:14

Side B

1. "Blue Feather (Version)" – 04:09

=== 12" vinyl single ===
Side A

1. "Love Like Blood (Version)" – 06:42

Side B

1. "Love Like Blood" – 04:14
2. "Blue Feather (Version)" – 04:09

=== Limited Gestalt Mix 12" single ===
Side A

1. "Love Like Blood (Gestalt Mix)" – 05:05

Side B

1. "Love Like Blood" – 04:14
2. "Blue Feather (Version)" – 04:09

== Charts ==
=== Weekly charts ===
Chart (1985)	Peak position
Australia (Kent Music Report)	83
Belgium (Ultratop 50 Flanders)	8
Ireland (IRMA)	30
Netherlands (Dutch Top 40)	8
Netherlands (Single Top 100)	5
New Zealand (Recorded Music NZ)	6
UK Singles (Official Charts)	16
West Germany (GfK)	24

=== Year-end charts ===
Chart (1985)	Position
Belgium (Ultratop Flanders)	59
Netherlands (Dutch Top 40)	75
Netherlands (Single Top 100)	50

== Covers ==
"Love Like Blood" was covered by several bands, and the German gothic rock band Love Like Blood took their name from this song.

=== Dead by April version ===
"Love Like Blood/Promise Me"

Single by Dead by April

from the album Stronger
- Released: 10 May 2010
- Recorded: 2010
- Genre: Alternative metal, pop rock
- Length: 3:40
- Label: Universal Records
- Songwriters: Jaz Coleman; Paul Ferguson; Paul Raven; Kevin Walker

Dead by April singles chronology
"Angels of Clarity" (2009)	"Love Like Blood/Promise Me" (2010)	"Dance in the Neon Light with Lena Philipsson" (2011)

In 2010, Swedish alternative metal band Dead by April released a cover version of "Love Like Blood" as a stand-alone single on 10 May 2010 on iTunes and as a double A-side single alongside previously released track "Promise Me" from their eponymous debut album. No music videos were made for either of the tracks. "Love Like Blood" was the first track recorded by the band with their new singer Zandro Santiago, and was later included on their compilation album Stronger, released on 24 January 2011.

Digital single

No.	Title	Length
1.	"Love Like Blood"	3:40
2.	"Promise Me"	3:35

=== Other versions ===
Band	Album	Year
Blacklight	Dream Dance, Vol. 25	2002
Iva Davies	Berlin Tapes	1996
Icehouse	Berlin Tapes	1996, 1999, 2002
Love Like Blood	Love Like Blood EP	1998
Technoir	Love Like Blood	2002
Out	Unik	2003
Blackmail	Friend or Foe? (Japanese edition)	2004
Sybreed	The Pulse of Awakening	2009
Dool	Love Like Blood EP	2019
