= Turn to Red =

1979 EP by Killing Joke

EP by Killing Joke
- Released: 26 October 1979
- Recorded: August 1979
- Studio: Gooseberry Sound (London)
- Genre: Post-punk
- Length: 13:10
- Label: Malicious Damage
- Producer: Killing Joke

Killing Joke chronology
Turn to Red (1979)	Killing Joke (1980)

Singles from Turn to Red
- 1. "Nervous System" Released: 30 November 1979

Turn To Red (12-inch)

EP by Killing Joke
- Released: 14 December 1979
- Genre: Post-punk
- Length: 16:58
- Label: Island

Killing Joke chronology
Turn To Red (12-inch) (1979)	Killing Joke (1980)

Turn to Red (sometimes known as Almost Red or Nervous System) is an EP and the debut release by English post-punk band Killing Joke. It was released as a 10-inch EP on 26 October 1979 by Malicious Damage and re-released as a 12-inch EP on 14 December by Island Records.

== History ==
In 1978, Jaz Coleman and Paul Ferguson left Mat Stagger Band to form Killing Joke. In February 1979, they placed an advertisement in the music press which attracted guitarist Kevin "Geordie" Walker and bass guitarist Martin "Youth" Glover. According to Coleman, their manifesto was to "define the exquisite beauty of the atomic age in terms of style, sound and form." The band was formed in June. The first song the band composed was "Are You Receiving?".

In late 1979, they began the Malicious Damage record label with graphic artist Mike Coles as a way to press and sell their music.

An advance of the EP was sent to legendary DJ John Peel, who was keen to champion the band's urgent new sound, and the release received extensive airplay. The band was immediately invited to record a John Peel Session for the BBC on 17 October 1979, which was aired on 29 October.

== Release ==
On 26 October 1979, the EP was officially released in 10" format by Malicious Damage. Melody Maker made it Single of the Week on 10 November 1979. A supportive namecheck by John Lydon in NME secured more interest in the new band.

On 14 December 1979, it was re-released in 7" and 12" format by Island Records, now with "Almost Red" added, a dub remix of the title track.

The Turn to Red release became a collectable for the four scarce "art cards" that were included with the disc in its clear plastic sleeve. The track "Turn to Red" featured a locked groove, repeating the word 'red' infinitely. The building featured on the sleeve is Centre Point in New Oxford Street, London.

Killing Joke quickly developed this sound into something denser, more aggressive and more akin to heavy metal with their debut studio album, Killing Joke.

== Track listing ==
All songs written and composed by Killing Joke (Jaz Coleman, Kevin "Geordie" Walker, Martin "Youth" Glover, Paul Ferguson).

=== Original 10" Release ===
Side A
No.	Title	Length
1.	"Nervous System"	4:10
2.	"Turn to Red"	4:10

Side B
No.	Title	Length
1.	"Are You Receiving"	4:50

=== 12" Release ===
Side A
No.	Title	Length
1.	"Almost Red"	3:48
2.	"Nervous System"	4:10

Side B
No.	Title	Length
1.	"Are You Receiving"	4:50
2.	"Turn to Red"	4:10

== Personnel ==
Killing Joke

- Jaz Coleman – Vocals, keyboards, production
- Kevin "Geordie" Walker – Guitar, production
- Martin "Youth" Glover – Bass guitar, production
- Paul Ferguson – Drums, production

Technical

- Mark Lusardi – engineering
- Jonz – mastering
- Mike Coles – sleeve graphic design
