= Wardance (song) =

Song by Killing Joke

Single by Killing Joke

from the album Killing Joke
- B-side: "Pssyche"
- Released: February 1980
- Genre: Post-punk
- Length: 3:40
- Label: Malicious Damage
- Songwriters: Jaz Coleman, Kevin "Geordie" Walker, Martin "Youth" Glover, Paul Ferguson
- Producer: Killing Joke

Killing Joke singles chronology
"Nervous System" (1979)	"Wardance" (1980)	"Change" (1980)

"Wardance" is a song by English post-punk band Killing Joke. It was released in February 1980 by Malicious Damage as the band's first single. The song was re-recorded for their self-titled debut album. The song has been performed at most of their live shows.

== Release ==
"Wardance" was released on 7" vinyl by Malicious Damage. A small number of copies from the original pressing came with a pre-typed form of military 'call-up papers' to be filled out and submitted by the purchaser. The B-side, "Pssyche", was commonly played live.

The single did not chart in the UK but reached number 50 in the US Billboard Dance Music/Club Play singles chart.

== Cover versions ==
In 1993, Econoline Crush covered "Pssyche" for their Purge EP, and in 2004, Nouvelle Vague covered it on their self-titled debut album. In 2001, Mad Capsule Markets covered "Wardance" on their album 010.

== Track listing ==
Side A

1. "Wardance" – 3:40

Side B

1. "Pssyche" – 5:02

== Charts ==
Year	Chart	Peak Position
1980	U.S. Billboard Hot Dance Club Songs	50

== See also ==
- List of anti-war songs
