= Killing Joke =

English post-punk band

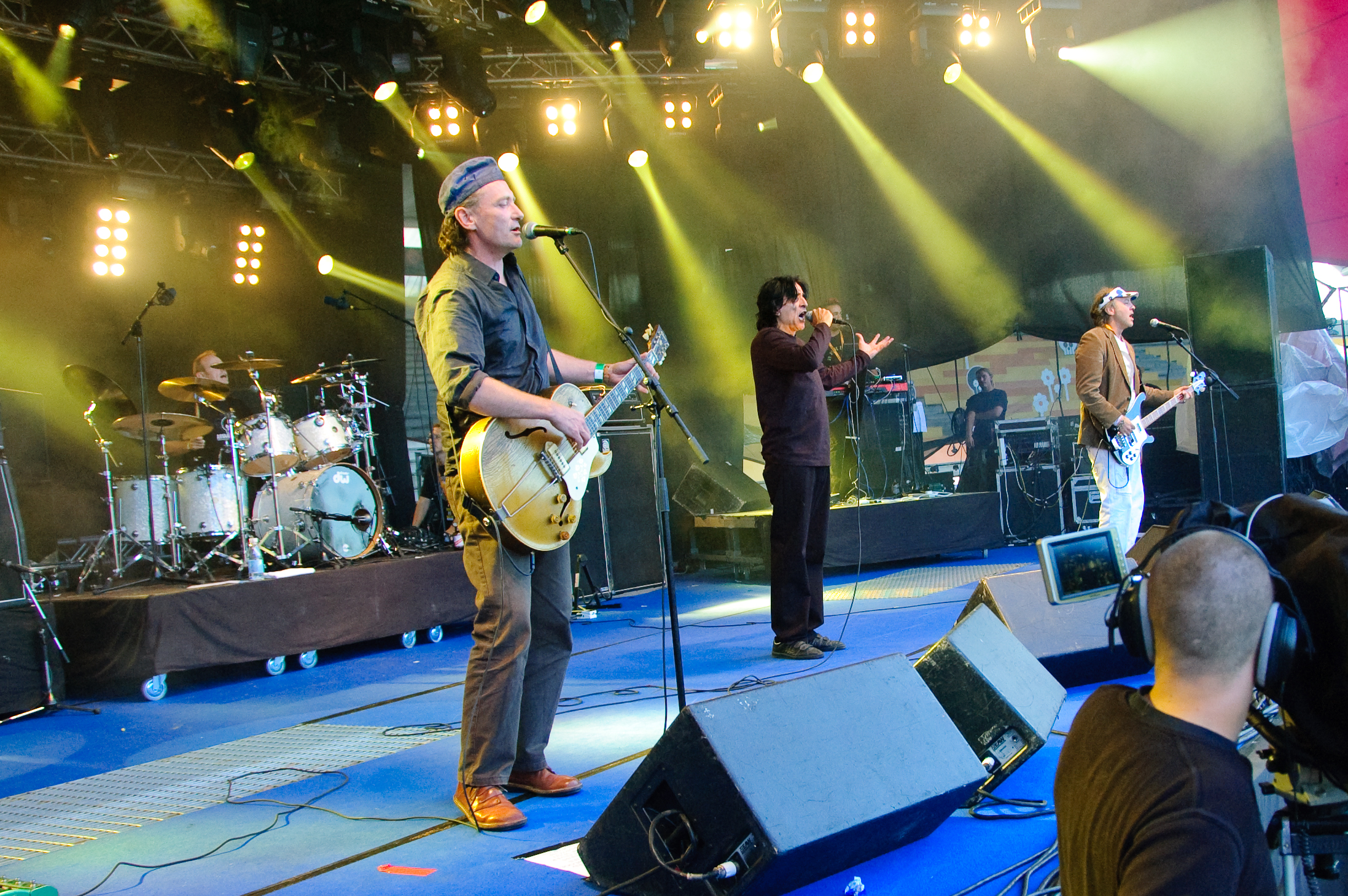
- Killing Joke performing at the 2009 Ilosaarirock Festival. From left to right: Ferguson (background), Walker, Coleman, Youth

Background information
- Origin: Notting Hill, London, England
- Genres: Post-punk; gothic rock; industrial rock; industrial metal; new wave
- Works: Killing Joke discography
- Years active: 1978–1996; 2002–2023
- Labels: Malicious Damage; Island; E.G.; Polydor; Virgin; Noise; Zoo; Butterfly; Big Life; Zuma; Cooking Vinyl; Spinefarm
- Past members: Geordie Walker; Paul Raven; Martin Atkins; Dave "Taif" Ball; Geoff Dugmore; Ben Calvert; Reza Udhin; Jaz Coleman; Paul Ferguson; Youth
- Website: www.killingjoke.co.uk

Killing Joke were an English rock band formed in Notting Hill, London, in 1978 by Jaz Coleman (vocals, keyboards), Paul Ferguson (drums), Geordie Walker (guitar) and Youth (bass).

Their first album, Killing Joke, was released in 1980. After the release of Revelations in 1982, bassist Youth was replaced by Paul Raven. The band achieved mainstream success in 1985 with the album Night Time and particularly the single "Love Like Blood", which reached the top ten in Belgium, the Netherlands and New Zealand.

The band's musical style emerged from the post-punk scene, but stood out due to their heavier approach, and has been cited as a key influence on industrial rock. Their style evolved over many years, at times incorporating elements of gothic rock, synth-pop and electronic music, but always featuring Walker's prominent guitar and Coleman's "savagely strident vocals". Killing Joke have influenced many bands and artists, such as Metallica, Nirvana, Nine Inch Nails and Soundgarden.

Following Raven's sudden death in 2007, all four founding members returned to the band's lineup the following year. Coleman and Walker were the only constant members of the band until Walker's death in 2023.

== History ==
=== Formative years (1978–1982) ===
Paul Ferguson was the drummer in the band Matt Stagger when he met Jaz Coleman (from Cheltenham, Gloucestershire) in Notting Hill, London in late 1978. Coleman was briefly the keyboard player in that band. He and Ferguson then left to gradually piece together Killing Joke. In the following months, they placed advertisements in Melody Maker and other music papers. Guitarist Geordie Walker joined them in March 1979, followed by bassist Youth. The band was formed in June 1979. Coleman said their manifesto at the time was to "define the exquisite beauty of the atomic age in terms of style, sound and form". Coleman gave an explanation concerning their name: "The killing joke is like when people watch something like Monty Python on the television and laugh, when really they're laughing at themselves. It's like a soldier in the first world war. He's in the trench, he knows his life is gone and that within the next ten minutes he's gonna be dead ... and then suddenly he realises that some cunt back in Westminster's got him sussed—'What am I doing this for? I don't want to kill anyone, I'm just being controlled'." The band played their debut gig on 4 August 1979 at Whitcombe Lodge in Brockworth, near Gloucester, supporting the Ruts and The Selecter.

By September 1979, shortly before the release of their debut EP, Turn to Red, they started the Malicious Damage record label with graphic artist Mike Coles as a way to press and sell their music. Island Records distributed the records (and released their debut single "Nervous System"), before they switched to E.G. Records with distribution through Polydor from 1980. Killing Joke's early material "fused together elements of punk, funk and dub reggae". Turn to Red came to the attention of BBC Radio 1 DJ John Peel, who was keen to champion the band's urgent new sound and gave them extensive airplay. In October 1979, the band recorded their first session for Peel's radio show. An NME concert review said that "their sound is a bit like early [Siouxsie and the] Banshees without the thrilling, amoral imagination". Concerning their live performances, it was said that "the only animation on stage is provided by Jaz who crouches behind his synthesizer, making forays like a Neanderthal man gripped by a gesturing, gibbering fury". The songs on the 1980 "Wardance/Pssyche" single were described as "heavy dance music" by the press. The band had changed their sound into something denser, more aggressive and more akin to heavy metal. Their debut album, Killing Joke, was released in October 1980; the band had considered calling it Tomorrow's World. The press started to criticise them for the lack of new material appearing on the B-sides of singles, which often featured different mixes. The group preferred to carry on working in the studio and released What's THIS For...! just eight months after Killing Joke, in June 1981. For this second album, they hired sound engineer Nick Launay, who had previously recorded with Public Image Ltd. They toured extensively throughout the UK during this time, with fans of post-punk and heavy metal taking interest in Killing Joke via singles such as "Follow the Leaders".

Killing Joke also became notorious largely due to the controversies that arose from their imagery. The images that appeared on their records and stage set were often bizarre and potentially shocking and inflammatory. Critics noted the band's black humour and the use of musical and visual shock tactics to create a reaction. The "Wardance" sleeve had already depicted Fred Astaire dancing in a war field. One promotional poster featured an original photo, erroneously believed to be of Pope Pius XI. The picture was of German abbot Alban Schachleiter walking among rows of Nazi brownshirts offering Hitler salutes and appearing to return the salute; it was later used for the cover of the band's compilation album Laugh? I Nearly Bought One!

Revelations was recorded in 1982 in Germany near Cologne with producer Conny Plank, who had previously worked for Deutsch Amerikanische Freundschaft, Neu!, and Kraftwerk. The album was supported by a pair of performances on BBC Radio's "The John Peel Show" and a slot on UK TV show Top of the Pops for "Empire Song". It was the first time that one of their albums had entered the top 20 of the UK Albums Chart: Revelations peaked at No. 12 at its release. Members of the band, especially Coleman, had become immersed in the occult, particularly the works of occultist Aleister Crowley. In February of that year, Coleman, with Walker following shortly after, moved to Iceland to survive the Apocalypse, which Coleman predicted was coming soon. While in Iceland, Coleman and Walker worked with musicians from the band Þeyr in the project Niceland. Youth, who had stayed in England, left the band after a few months. He then began the band Brilliant with Ferguson, but the latter defected and travelled to Iceland to rejoin Killing Joke with new bassist Paul Raven.

=== Paul Raven and new direction (1982–1988) ===
The new Killing Joke line-up recorded again with Plank, yielding the single "Birds of a Feather" and a six-track 10" EP Ha!, recorded live at Larry's Hideaway in Toronto, Ontario, Canada in August. In 1983 the band released Fire Dances and its single, "Let's All Go (to the Fire Dances)", the first Killing Joke single to be promoted with a music video. Another non-album single, "Me or You?", was released in October.

The following year brought the arrival of producer Chris Kimsey, who had previously worked with the Rolling Stones and Led Zeppelin. The first releases with Kimsey were "Eighties" (April 1984) and "A New Day" (July 1984). The band achieved mainstream success in January 1985 with the single "Love Like Blood", which blended goth and new wave to pop and rock; it peaked at No. 16 in the UK charts. In Europe and overseas, it reached the No. 5 position in the Netherlands, No. 6 in New Zealand and No. 8 in Belgium. This song and the earlier single "Eighties" were both included on their fifth album, Night Time, released later that year. The album took the band's songwriting in a more melodic, "anthemic" direction and reached No. 11 in the UK albums chart, their highest position to date. Night Time also became an international success, staying in the Dutch charts for nine weeks, reaching the top 10, and peaking at No. 8 in New Zealand during a 14-week stay. The band, still on the E.G. label, then quit their distribution deal with Polydor and signed a new one with Virgin Records.

The following album, Brighter than a Thousand Suns (1986) was also produced by Kimsey and saw the band's style develop further. The label rejected Kimsey's original mixes and had the album re-mixed against the wishes of the band, in an attempt to achieve more commercial success. The results have been retrospectively described as over-produced. Despite the intentions of the label, the album was a commercial failure compared to Night Time, failing to reach the top 50 in the UK chart. Its two singles fared little better: "Adorations" narrowly missed the UK Top 40 and "Sanity" peaked at number 70. However, the band continued touring successfully until the end of the year. Kimsey's original mixes of Brighter Than A Thousand Suns were eventually restored on the 2008 re-release, to a more favourable response.

In 1987, Coleman and Walker began working on a new project, which was presented by Coleman and Walker as a studio project to the rest of the band. Raven took part in the sessions but ultimately asked for his name to be removed from the album credits. Ferguson recorded drums in Berlin but, according to Coleman, was dismissed because he was not able to manage the precise timings. Raven denied this version of events, stating, "I know Paul and when he does something he does it properly. If it wasn't right he would have stayed there 'til it was". Session player Jimmy Copley was brought in to provide the drumming on the album, along with percussion player Jeff Scantlebury. Raven and Ferguson quit Killing Joke shortly afterwards, with Raven purportedly calling Coleman and Walker "a pair of ego-strokers". Coleman then delivered a lecture at London's Courtauld Institute about his method behind the songs, expounding on its origins in gematria and the occult, while Walker and Scantlebury provided a minimal acoustic musical backing. A recording of this event was released as The Courtauld Talks.

The resulting album, Outside the Gate, released the following June, is Killing Joke's most controversial work to date due to its complex synth instrumentation and stylistic departure. It entered the UK Albums Chart at number 92 and stayed for just one week. No gigs were played in support of the album and it was not released in the US. Virgin dropped the band two months later, by which time Coleman and Walker had become embroiled in a lengthy legal battle to extricate themselves from their contract with E.G.

=== Revised line-up (1989–1991) ===
Towards the end of 1988, Coleman and Walker revived the band and began looking for full-time bass players and drummers. First on board was drummer Martin Atkins, who had gained notability in Public Image Ltd. A suitable bass player proved more difficult. Former Smiths member Andy Rourke was hired, then dismissed after only three days. Eventually the band settled on Welsh bass player Dave "Taif" Ball, and played their first gigs in almost two years in December 1988. Touring continued across the UK, Europe and the US until August 1989, when the band took a break to record new material in Germany and allow Coleman time to record Songs from the Victorious City with Anne Dudley of Art of Noise.

For reasons that remain unclear, the German sessions were shelved and bass player Taif left the band. He was replaced by former member Paul Raven and the revised line-up began recording again, this time in London. The result was Killing Joke's eighth album, Extremities, Dirt & Various Repressed Emotions, released on the German Noise International label in 1990. It marked a return to a heavier sound. "Money Is Not Our God" was the lead single. The band toured Europe and North America until unexpectedly disbanding again in mid-1991. Coleman emigrated to New Zealand to live on a remote Pacific island, and Killing Joke entered a hiatus.

Atkins continued with Walker, Raven and the band's live keyboard player, John Bechdel, as the short-lived Murder, Inc., recruiting Scottish vocalist Chris Connelly and reuniting with Ferguson as second drummer.

=== Pandemonium and Democracy (1992–1996) ===
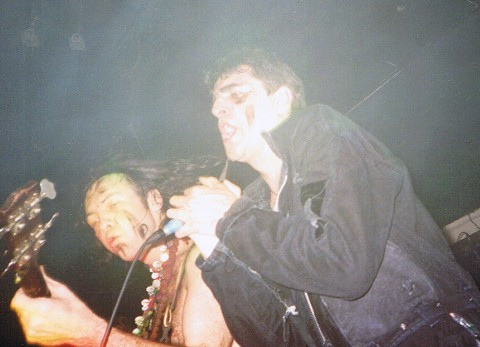
Youth and Coleman (1994)

A Killing Joke anthology, Laugh? I Nearly Bought One!, was released in 1992; during its production, Walker became reacquainted with Youth, who suggested that they reform the band with himself back on bass. That same year, two singles (on cassette and CD) appeared featuring the early songs "Change" and "Wardance" remixed by Youth, who was by then a successful producer. In late 1993, Walker, Youth, and Coleman (alongside new drummer Geoff Dugmore) started work on Killing Joke's ninth studio album. Portions of the album were recorded inside the King's Chamber of The Great Pyramid of Giza.

Pandemonium was released in 1994 on Youth's Butterfly Recordings label, featuring a heavy and diverse new style. Tom Larkin, of New Zealand band Shihad, performed additional drums on the album. Coleman had earlier produced Shihad's 1993 debut album, but relations later soured due to a dispute over Coleman's producer's fee. Pandemonium also featured several Egyptian musicians that Coleman had previously worked with on Songs from the Victorious City, including percussionist Hossam Ramzy and violinist Aboud Abdel Al., and earned Killing Joke a memorable Top of the Pops appearance for the single "Millennium", which was a UK Top 40 hit (the album itself made the Top 20). The title track was also released as a single and made the UK Top 30. The album itself became Killing Joke's best-selling work.

In 1995, the band recorded the song "Hollywood Babylon" for the Showgirls soundtrack of the Paul Verhoeven film of the same name.

A follow-up album, Democracy, was released in 1996 and also produced by Youth. Democracy introduced acoustic guitar to several songs and featured more explicitly political lyrics. The title track was released as a single and made the UK Top 40. Much of Pandemonium and all of Democracy featured drummer Dugmore, who also played live with the band during this era. Nick Holywell-Walker also joined the band on keyboards and programming for 11 years from 1994 to 2005, notably on Democracy and XXV Gathering. Youth bowed out of live performance early in the Democracy tour and was replaced by Troy Gregory, previously of Prong.

After the Democracy tour, the band went on their longest hiatus to date. Coleman and Youth produced a string of orchestral rock albums based on the music of classic rock artists such as Led Zeppelin, Pink Floyd and the Doors. Coleman became Composer in Residence for New Zealand and Czech symphony orchestras, and made his acting debut with the main role in the film Rok ďábla (Year of the Devil) by Czech filmmaker Petr Zelenka.

=== Reformation and death of Paul Raven (2002–2007) ===
In 2002, Coleman, Walker and Youth recorded their second self-titled album with special guest Dave Grohl on drums. Produced by Andy Gill and released to much acclaim in 2003, it was heralded as a powerful addition to their earlier classics. In 2003, the band played at the biggest open air festival in Europe—Przystanek Woodstock in Poland. The war on terror and the invasion of Iraq were cited as major factors in their reforming, reflected in the lyrical content of much of the album, based on themes of war, government control and Armageddon. The album, which fell just short of the UK Top 40 and spawned two singles, "Loose Cannon" (a UK Top 25 hit) and "Seeing Red". The songs were all credited to Coleman/Walker/Youth/Gill, although Raven's name is also on the list of musicians on the liner notes, marking his return to the band after more than a decade. The album was accompanied by a tour of the United States, Europe and Australia in 2003–2004, with ex-Prong drummer Ted Parsons on board.

In February 2005, now with young drummer Ben Calvert (Twin Zero, Sack Trick), Killing Joke played two consecutive shows at London's Shepherd's Bush Empire to commemorate their 25th anniversary. DVD and CD recordings from these concerts were released in the fall of the same year as XXV Gathering: The Band that Preys Together Stays Together. In June, remastered and expanded editions of Pandemonium and Democracy, were released by Cooking Vinyl. These were followed in July by remasters of their first four albums (Killing Joke to Ha!) on EMI, who by then owned the E.G. Records catalogue. The second batch of EMI remasters would not appear until January 2008. That year, Reza Udhin joined the band on keyboards when they supported Mötley Crüe's British tour; they then began work on their next album in Prague. Killing Joke's contribution to the world of rock was recognised when they were awarded the "Lifetime Achievement Award" at the 2005 Kerrang Awards. The band recorded the new album in "Hell", the basement rehearsal space of Studio Faust Records in Prague, opting for simplicity and raw energy through the use of live takes with a minimum of overdubs. The result was Hosannas from the Basements of Hell, released in April 2006, which made the UK Top 75.

During a European tour in April 2006, Paul Raven abruptly departed after a few dates to tour with Ministry, and was temporarily replaced by Kneill Brown. In October, it was announced that Coleman had been chosen as Composer in Residence for the European Union, to be commissioned to write music for special occasions.

Early in 2007, Killing Joke released three archival collections. The first, Inside Extremities, was a double album of material taken from the band's preparations for the Extremities album, including rehearsals, rare mixes, previously unheard track "The Fanatic" and a full live show from the Extremities tour. This was followed by two volumes of Bootleg Vinyl Archive, each consisting of a 3-CD box set of live bootleg recordings originally released on vinyl in the 1980s, plus the Astoria gig from the Pandemonium tour (which was voted one of the greatest gigs of all time by Kerrang). The 1990 album Extremities, Dirt & Various Repressed Emotions, which had long been out of print, was reissued in remastered form.

On 20 October, Paul Raven died of heart failure prior to a recording session in Geneva, Switzerland. In his honour, Coleman composed the track "The Raven King", which appeared on the next album. In 2008, the second batch of albums, from Fire Dances to Outside the Gate, was reissued in remastered form with bonus tracks.

=== Reunion of the original line-up and death of Geordie Walker (2008–present) ===
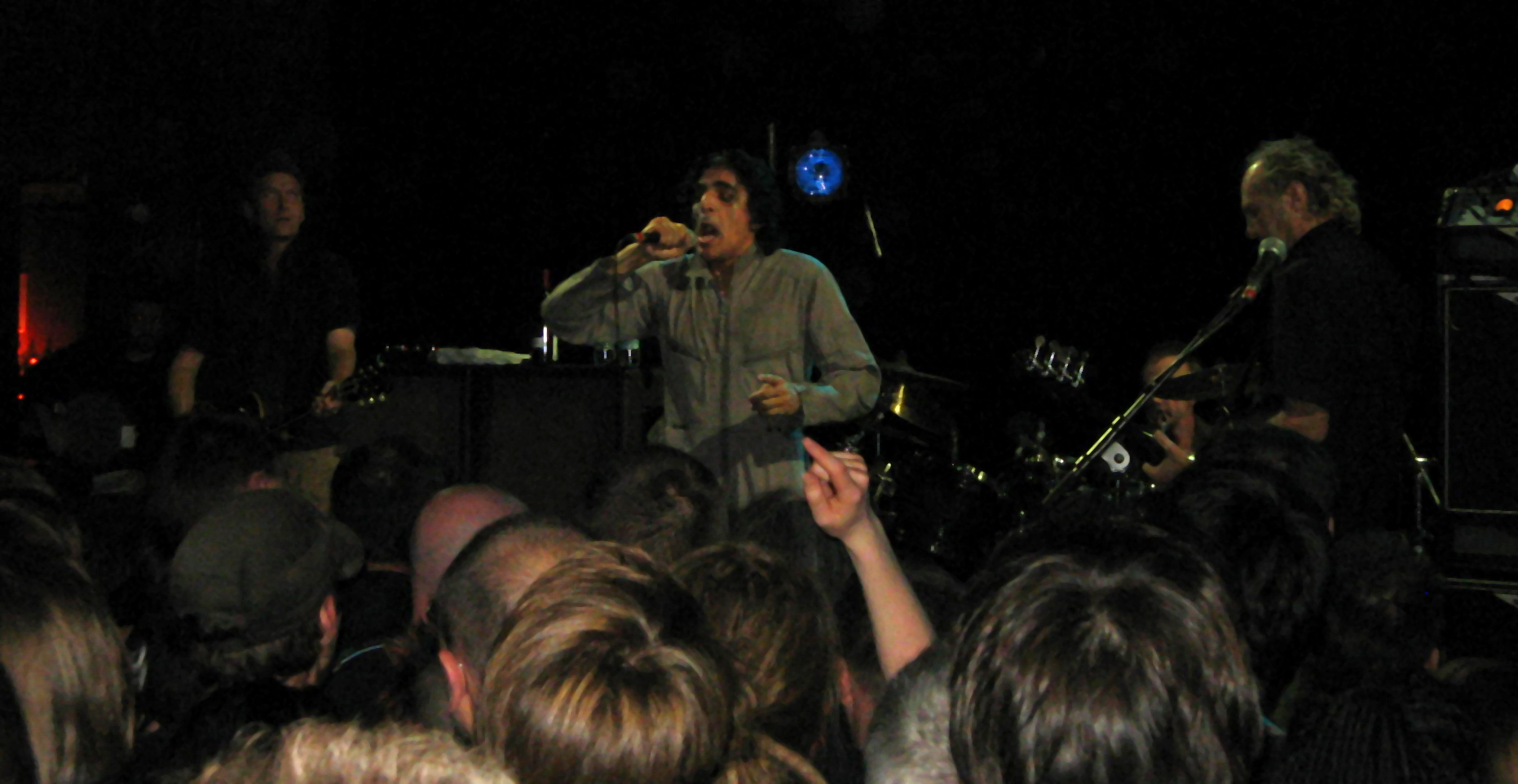
Killing Joke live in Paris during the 2008 tour (Le Trabendo, 27 September 2008)

After the death of Raven, the original line-up of Coleman, Youth, Walker and Ferguson reunited. Coleman told Terrorizer magazine how the return of Ferguson came up after 20 years of absence:

Everything came together when we all met at...Raven's funeral. It was funny the unifying effect it had on all of us. It made us realise our mortality and how important Killing Joke is to all of us.

They assembled in Granada, Spain, to prepare a world tour consisting of two nights in various capital cities of the world, playing a programme of four complete albums. Recordings of the rehearsals were later released as Duende - The Spanish Sessions. The first night was dedicated to their first two albums, Killing Joke and What's THIS For...!, while the second night featured large parts of Pandemonium plus some early Island singles. The world tour began in September in Tokyo and concluded in Chicago in October.

An album of radio session recordings, The Peel Sessions 1979–1981, was released in September 2008. This was the second time all 17 tracks were released in their live session form.

The band then appeared at several festivals, including All Tomorrow's Parties, Sonisphere Festival, and Rebellion Festival, headlining the latter. They also performed in the Big Top Tent at the 2009 Isle of Wight Festival after being hand-picked by Tim Burgess, frontman for the Charlatans.

During October and November 2009, they recorded the album Absolute Dissent (2010), marking the band's 30th anniversary. It was preceded by the In Excelsis EP in June 2010. In November, the band received the "Innovator Award" at the 2010 Classic Rock Roll of Honour; the award was presented to Killing Joke by Jimmy Page of Led Zeppelin, who stated, "I go back a long way with Jaz Coleman and the band. I used to go and see the band, and it was a band that really impressed me because Geordie's guitar sound was just really, really strong. And they were really tribal, the band, and it was really intense. It was just really good to hear something like that during the 80s, which sort of caved in a bit with haircuts and synthesizers". The band were also honoured by Metal Hammer at their annual awards, receiving the Album of the Year award for Absolute Dissent.

In 2012, the group released MMXII. It reached No. 44 upon its first week of release, the band's highest UK chart placement since their eponymous 2003 album, as well as charting across Europe.

The band released their 15th studio album, Pylon, in October 2015. The deluxe edition contained five additional tracks. A nine-date British tour followed to promote the record. Pylon entered the UK albums chart at No. 16, becoming the band's first UK Top 20 album since 1994. In November 2016, the band played at the Brixton Academy in London, before embarking on a European tour, their longest to date. In 2018, the band did a worldwide tour to celebrate their 40th anniversary.

In March 2022 the band released a new EP, Lord of Chaos, their first new material in seven years.

Geordie Walker died in Prague on 25 November 2023, aged 64, after suffering a stroke.

Paul Ferguson has subsequently created a new band, Light of Eternity.

== Style and influences ==
The band called their sound "tension music". Co-founder Ferguson described it as "the sound of the earth vomiting. I'm never quite sure whether to be offended by the question of 'are we punk' or not, because, I loved punk music, but we weren't. And I think our influences were beyond punk. Obviously before punk, there was Led Zeppelin, Black Sabbath and there was Yes even and King Crimson, and those had all influenced me as a player, and the other guys would say other things, but I'm sure they were all part of their history as well".

Coleman's "menacing" vocal style and "terrifying growl" have been compared to Motörhead's Lemmy. In the first part of their career, Coleman also played synth while singing, adding electronic atonal sounds to create a disturbing atmosphere.

Walker's guitar style is metallic and cold. Walker stated that "the guitar should convey some sort of emotion". He cited Siouxsie and the Banshees's original guitarist John McKay, who "came out with these chord structures that I found very refreshing". According to critic Simon Reynolds, Walker took Keith Levene's guitar sound from PiL to another, almost inhuman and extreme level. Ferguson's tribal drum style has been compared to early Siouxsie and the Banshees. Coleman had stated in early 1980 that Ferguson listened to the Banshees.

The band experimented with an industrial metal-influenced sound on Pandemonium, and it continued on their later albums.

== Legacy ==
Killing Joke have inspired artists of many genres. They have been name-checked by several heavy metal and rock bands, such as Metallica and Soundgarden. Metallica covered "The Wait" and James Hetfield picked Coleman as one of his favourite singers. Soundgarden cited them as one of their main influences when they started playing. Jane's Addiction said that the group was one of their influences; singer Perry Farrell was inspired by the percussive and tribal aspect of their music. Helmet frontman Page Hamilton, whose band covered "Primitive" and "Requiem", has described Killing Joke as "a huge-huge influence". Faith No More stated that all of their members liked the group, qualifying them as a "great band". Walker's style inspired Kurt Cobain's work with Nirvana, according to Bill Janovitz of AllMusic, with the use of a metallic sound mixed with a shimmering chorused effect. Foo Fighters, Nirvana drummer Grohl's subsequent band, covered "Requiem" in 1997. Metal band Fear Factory covered "Millennium" in 2005.

The band have inspired many industrial bands, including Nine Inch Nails and Ministry. They have been cited by Trent Reznor, Nine Inch Nails's leader, who mentioned his interest in their early material, and said that he studied their music. Al Jourgensen of Ministry described himself as a "big fan" of the group. Marilyn Manson listened to them during his formative years. Godflesh frontman Justin Broadrick appreciated Killing Joke for their early releases containing dub versions, and has stated that, "I wouldn’t play guitar how I do without that band."

The group has also been cited by alternative music acts such as My Bloody Valentine and LCD Soundsystem. Shoegaze guitarist and composer Kevin Shields of My Bloody Valentine mentioned the band and specifically praised Walker's touch, which he described as "this effortless playing producing a monstrous sound". In 2002, James Murphy of dance-punk band LCD Soundsystem lifted the rhythm section of "Change" on his debut single, "Losing My Edge".

== Film ==
Killing Joke were the subject of a feature-length documentary film, The Death and Resurrection Show (2013), by filmmaker Shaun Pettigrew; its genesis came from an earlier video work financed by Coleman called Let Success Be Your Proof. The film was shown in various festivals between 2013 and 2014. Co-produced by Coleman, it combined archive footage of Killing Joke over the previous decades with tour footage, recording sessions and interviews with subjects including the members of the band, Jimmy Page, Dave Grohl, Peter Hook and Alex Paterson. The Death and Resurrection Show was broadcast on Sundance TV and was then released on DVD via the film's website in 2017. Uncut rated it 9 out of 10, saying "Shaun Pettigrew's film mixes outlandish anecdotes, arcane philosophy and blistering music".

== Members ==
=== Current members ===
Image	Name	Years active	Instruments	Release contributions
	Jaz Coleman	1978–1996; 2002–present	lead vocals; synthesizer; keyboards	all releases
	Paul Ferguson	1978–1987; 2008–present	drums; backing vocals	all releases from Turn to Red (1979) to Brighter Than a Thousand Suns (1986); An Incomplete Collection 1980–1985 (1990); Laugh? I Nearly Bought One! (1992); Wilful Days (1995); BBC in Concert (1995); No Way Out but Forward Go (2001); all releases from The Original Unperverted Pantomime (2008) onwards
	Youth	1979–1982; 1992–1996; 2002–2003; 2008–present	bass; backing vocals; keyboards (2008–present)	Turn to Red (1979); Killing Joke (1980); What's THIS For...! (1981); Revelations (1982); An Incomplete Collection 1980–1985 (1990); Laugh? I Nearly Bought One! (1992); Pandemonium (1994); Wilful Days (1995); Democracy (1996); Killing Joke (2003) – unspecified tracks; all releases from The Original Unperverted Pantomime (2008) onwards

=== Former members ===
Image	Name	Years active	Instruments	Release contributions
	Geordie Walker	1979–1996; 2002–2023 (until his death)	guitars; bass (1987–1988, 1991–1992, 2002–2003, 2007–2008); backing vocals	all releases
	Paul Raven	1982–1987; 1990–1991; 2003–2007 (until his death)	bass	Ha (1982); Fire Dances (1983); Night Time (1985); Brighter Than a Thousand Suns (1986); Outside the Gate (1988); Extremities, Dirt and Various Repressed Emotions (1990); An Incomplete Collection 1980–1985 (1990); Laugh? I Nearly Bought One! (1992); Wilful Days (1995); BBC in Concert (1995); No Way Out but Forward Go (2001); Killing Joke (2003) – unspecified tracks; XXV Gathering: Let Us Prey (2005); Hosannas from the Basements of Hell (2006)
	Martin Atkins	1988–1991	drums; backing vocals	Extremities, Dirt and Various Repressed Emotions (1990); Laugh? I Nearly Bought One! (1992); Wilful Days (1995)
	Dave "Taif" Ball	1988–1990	bass	Extremities, Dirt and Various Repressed Emotions (1990)
	Geoff Dugmore	1993–1996	drums	Pandemonium (1994); Democracy (1996)
	Ben Calvert	2005–2008	drums	Hosannas from the Basements of Hell (2006); XXV Gathering: Let Us Prey (2005)

=== Additional musicians ===
Image	Name	Years active	Instruments	Release contributions
	Dave Kovacevic	1984–1990	keyboards	Extremities, Dirt and Various Repressed Emotions (1990) – one track; BBC in Concert (1995); No Way Out but Forward Go (2001)
	Jimmy Copley	1987–1988 (died 2017)	drums	Outside the Gate (1988)
	John Bechdel	1990–1991	keyboards; programming	Extremities, Dirt and Various Repressed Emotions (1990)
	Nick Holywell-Walker	1994–1996; 2002–2005	keyboards; programming	Democracy (1996); XXV Gathering: Let Us Prey (2005); Malicious Damage (Live at the Astoria) (2019)
	Troy Gregory	1996	bass	none
	Dave Grohl	2002–2003	drums	Killing Joke (2003)
	Ted Parsons	2003–2004	drums	none
	Reza Udhin	2005–2016	keyboards; programming; backing vocals	Hosannas from the Basements of Hell (2006); The Gathering 2008 (2009); Absolute Dissent (2010); Down by the River (2011); Pylon (2015)
	Kneill Brown	2006	bass	none
	Jason Bowld	2007; 2012; 2013; 2014	drums	none
	Roi Robertson	2016–present	keyboards	Laugh at Your Peril (Live in London) (2018); Laugh at Your Peril (Live in Berlin) (2018); Total Invasion: Live in the USA (2021)

== Discography ==
Studio albums

- Killing Joke (1980)
- What's THIS For...! (1981)
- Revelations (1982)
- Fire Dances (1983)
- Night Time (1985)
- Brighter Than a Thousand Suns (1986)
- Outside the Gate (1988)
- Extremities, Dirt and Various Repressed Emotions (1990)
- Pandemonium (1994)
- Democracy (1996)
- Killing Joke (2003)
- Hosannas from the Basements of Hell (2006)
- Absolute Dissent (2010)
- MMXII (2012)
- Pylon (2015)
