= E.G. Records =

British record label

Virgin EG Records Limited
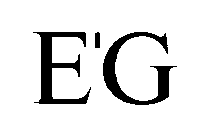
- Parent company: Universal Music Group (UMG) (2012–present; most of back catalogue)
- Founded: 1969
- Founder: David Enthoven; John Gaydon
- Defunct: 1996
- Status: Inactive
- Distributors: 1969–75 Island Records; 1976–85 Polydor / Polygram; 1986–2012 Virgin / EMI; 2013–2020 Virgin EMI / UMG; 2020–present EMI / UMG
- Genre: Various
- Country of origin: UK

Virgin EG Records (formerly E.G. Records until 1991) was a British artist management company and independent record label, mostly active during the 1970s and 1980s. The initials stood for its founders, David Enthoven and John Gaydon.

The pair signed on as managers of King Crimson in early 1969, during the formative stage of the band and prior to the release of debut In the Court of the Crimson King, with it springboarding their entrance into the record label and music publishing markets. They also signed T. Rex, Emerson, Lake & Palmer and Roxy Music to management.

Gaydon left the company in 1971 and Enthoven, due to declining health, in June 1977. Samuel George Alder and Mark Fenwick (later managing Roger Waters) took over control of the companies, re-releasing material from King Crimson in addition to new releases from acts such as Iain Ballamy, Bill Bruford, The Chieftains, Earthworks, Brian Eno, Robert Fripp, Human Chain, Killing Joke, Loose Tubes, Man Jumping, Penguin Cafe Orchestra, Elan Sicroff, Toyah Willcox, and U.K.

The label was distributed in the UK by Island Records (through 1974) and then Polydor Records. In the US, artists were placed on Atlantic Records, Warner Bros. Records, Reprise Records, Atco Records, Polydor Records, Passport Records/Jem Records, Caroline Records and Virgin Records and on various other labels in other parts of the world.

Alder and Fenwick were investors in Lloyd's of London and attempted an entrance into the real estate market; major losses on both ventures through 1988-1991 led them to have E.G. loan 4 million pounds towards their failing businesses, which led to no royalty payments to their roster for that time period. This prompted extensive legal battles with many of the artists they were involved with. Most notable among those was the one undertaken by Robert Fripp, which lasted 6 1/2 years (April 1991 – September 1997). Fripp has been publicly critical of Sam Alder's business practices, both in regards to the non-payment of royalties and beyond, recounting the development of the situation that led to the lawsuit and digitizing/reproducing financial/legal documents multiple times on his online diary. John Lurie of American group The Lounge Lizards, whose first album was released by the label in 1981, was also critical of E.G. Records business practices, which he described as deceptive and unethical.

E.G. was sold to its distributor Virgin Records in 1992, which continued operating E.G. In 1996, after Virgin was sold to EMI, it was absorbed into Virgin.

Enthoven was born on 5 July 1944. He continued in music management until his death on 11 August 2016.

== See also ==
- Discipline Global Mobile, independent music company founded by Robert Fripp (guitarist of King Crimson), whose tenets were made to be in direct opposition to the procedures of Sam Alder's E.G.
