= Geordie Walker =

British guitarist (1958–2023)

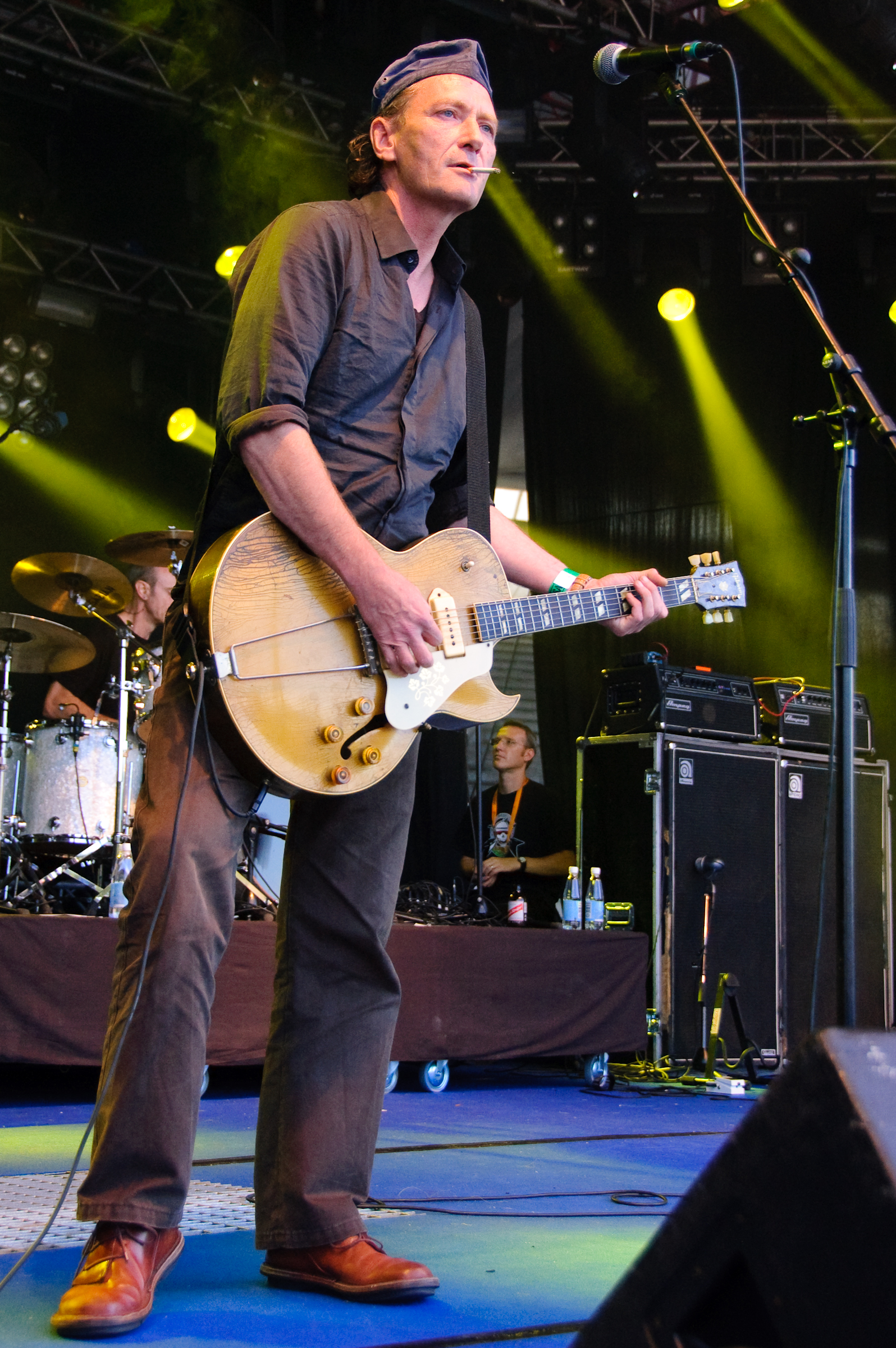
- Walker performing at the 2009 Ilosaarirock festival

Background information
- Born: Kevin Walker; 18 December 1958; Chester-le-Street, County Durham, England
- Died: 26 November 2023 (aged 64) Prague, Czech Republic
- Genres: Post-punk; industrial rock; gothic rock; new wave; synth-pop; industrial metal
- Occupation: Musician
- Instrument: Guitar
- Years active: 1979–2023
- Formerly of: Killing Joke; Murder, Inc.; The Damage Manual; Pigface

Kevin Walker (18 December 1958 – 26 November 2023), known professionally as Geordie Walker, was an English rock musician, songwriter and producer. He was best known as the guitarist of post-punk band Killing Joke. He joined the band in March 1979; his first recording was released in December of that year. Their debut eponymous studio album came out in October 1980. Walker recorded 15 studio albums with Killing Joke and also took part in various side-projects. His unorthodox style of electric guitar playing was widely acclaimed.

== Life and career ==
When he was ten years old, Walker was deeply marked by the guitar sound in the song "Sabre Dance" by Love Sculpture. "I used to go mad when it came on the radio." When he was fourteen, Walker's family moved south from Chester le Street to Bletchley in Buckinghamshire and he attended Leon School; it was during this era that he acquired his nickname due to his north-eastern "Geordie" accent. He decided to learn to play the guitar: "I used to run home from school at about four, lock myself in the bedroom, turn the amp up full, and thrash it till he [his dad] came in. It was a daily ritual". He learnt that melody lines are important, as opposed to solos. His first guitar was bought in Northampton at Christmas 1973; when his mother saw a Gibson Les Paul in the shop, she suggested he try it in remembrance of a concert she attended with Jimi Hendrix on the bill. After Walker played about two chords, his mother's verdict was: "We'll take it." He worked at that time, "two real jobs" that allowed him to save money. He then bought another guitar, a Gibson SG Junior.

Walker later moved to London to study architecture and became a founding member of Killing Joke in March 1979 when he responded to an advertisement placed by the singer Jaz Coleman. He had never played in a band before. His first release with Killing Joke, the Turn to Red EP came out in December 1979. Their debut self-titled album was released in October 1980. He recorded fifteen studio albums with the band between 1980 and 2015. Walker and Coleman were the only constant members of the group until Walker's death.

Walker had also been a member of industrial music supergroups Murder, Inc. and The Damage Manual.

In the mid-1990s, Walker lived in Royal Oak, Michigan, a suburb of Detroit, with his wife Ginny Kiraly and his son Atticus (born in 1992). At the time of the recording of Hosannas from the Basements of Hell in 2006, he produced UK girl punk rock act Mary–Jane at Faust Studios in Prague. He then resided in Prague, where he co-operated with Studio Faust Records recording other artist's music. He divorced in 2012. He continued living in Czech Republic with his partner Alexandra Kocourkova, and their daughter Isabella (born in 2018).

== Influences ==
Walker cited the band Love Sculpture featuring Dave Edmunds and their sound on their cover version of "Sabre Dance" because "it used the guitar as a musical instrument to convey an atmosphere, it wasn't normal guitar playing which people feel they have to play, certain rhythms, certain solos, certain scales". Walker also named Siouxsie and the Banshees' debut studio album The Scream (1978) as an influence because their original guitarist John McKay "came out with these chord structures that I found very refreshing".

== Style ==
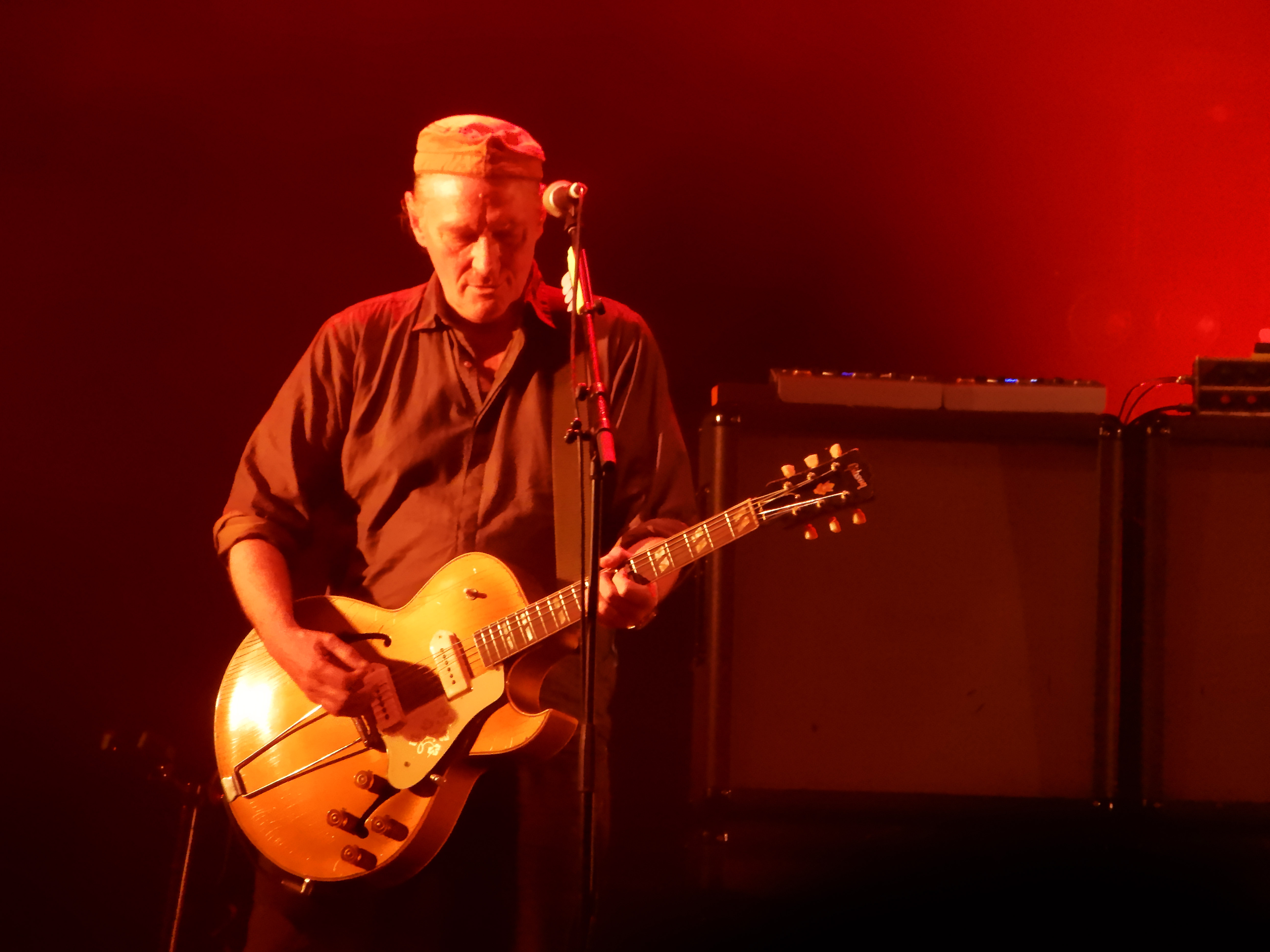
Walker at Hellfest 2022

Walker tuned his guitar a whole tone lower than standard, an unusual choice in the 1980s. "It suits the resonance and the volume of the thing, and you can use heavier strings [...] Basically if I play an E-position chord, it's D." Walker said that "a guitar has a lot of musical capability, but it has the rhythm as well. As one instrument, I think it has the most pleasing sound, the attack, the rhythm". Concerning his guitar playing, Walker explained: "If you hit a chord and press down on the bridge, it bends all six notes at once, that's probably one of the odder aspects of my technique. If you want to get technical—things like augmented fourths and sevenths have a certain unnerving effect, a bit like a tingle up the spine. I go for a lot of those in my chord structures".

Jimmy Page of Led Zeppelin hailed Walker's guitar sound as "really, really strong", while peer Kevin Shields of My Bloody Valentine praised Walker's guitar playing, which he described as "this effortless playing producing a monstrous sound".

== Equipment ==
His guitar of choice was a hollow-bodied 1952 Gibson ES-295 in gold lacquer with a trapeze tailpiece, a model also used by Elvis Presley sideman Scotty Moore. Walker bought it in the early 1980s from an old jazzman who played in clubs. He plugged it into two Burman amplifiers, "and the sound was there – a full resonance, and totally bell-like with the sustain on it through 250 watts of amplification in stereo. You can feel the thing vibrating, it's a huge sound. I tune the guitar in D (below bottom E) and my strings are really thick, I use an 062 on the bottom [in 1984], and because of the way I tune the guitar, the strings still have the same response as a normal guitar would. The amplification makes the bottom end sound unreal. [...] the sound of the guitar is a lot sharper, a lot clearer than other ones I've heard." By 2013, Walker was using slightly lighter gauge strings, with 058s on the bottom.

In the 1980s, Walker used ADT units made by Bell, one on each amplifier: "It's got from a really tight delay to a single short delay, and a pitch bend on it", and an Electro Harmonix Deluxe Memory Man Delay. Later in his career, Walker also used a Line 6 DL4 digital delay unit onstage.

== Death ==
Walker died in Prague on 26 November 2023, two days after suffering a stroke. He was 64.
