= System Express =

Compilation album by System 7
- Released: October 1996 UK 2CD; February 1997 North America; June 1998 Japan; November 2000 UK 1CD re-release
- Recorded: 1996
- Genre: Ambient; Dance; Electronica
- Length: 79:00 CD1 + 21:08 CD2
- Label: Butterfly Big Life BFLCD21X UK; Hypnotic (Cleopatra) North America; Flavour Japan; A-Wave AAWCD005 UK re-release
- Producer: System 7

Professional ratings
Review scores
Source	Rating
Muzik	4/5 stars

System Express is a compilation album by dance/ambient band System 7 with remixes of tracks from their first four studio albums, including seven completely new mixes. A limited UK edition came with a bonus CD EP of two additional remixes.

== Track listing ==
=== Mixed CD / Unmixed 3LP ===
(BFLCD21, AAWCD005) (BFLLP 21)

#	Track	Length	Written by	Produced by	Mixed by
1	"Alpha Wave (Plastikman Acid House Mix)" (original version on Point 3 - Fire Album)	10:43	Steve Hillage & Miquette Giraudy	Steve Hillage & Miquette Giraudy	Richie Hawtin, re-edited by Steve Hillage
2	"Desir (Turbo Mix)" (original version on 777)	05:52	Steve Hillage, Miquette Giraudy & DJ Lewis	Steve Hillage, Miquette Giraudy & DJ Lewis	Greg Hunter & DJ Lewis, re-edited by Steve Hillage
3	"Hanger 84 (Cox's WW Ultimatum Mix)" (original version on Power of Seven)	05:40	Steve Hillage & Miquette Giraudy	Steve Hillage & Miquette Giraudy	Carl Cox
4	"Coltrane (Red Moon Mix)" (original version on Point 3 - Fire Album)	08:57	Steve Hillage & Miquette Giraudy	Steve Hillage & Miquette Giraudy	System 7 & Greg Hunter, re-edited by Steve Hillage
5	"Altitude (Easy Life Mix)" (original version on System 7)	08:51	Derrick May & Steve Hillage	Derrick May & Steve Hillage	System 7 & Adam Wren
6	"7:7 Expansion (Elastic Mix)" (original version on 777)	07:31	Youth, Tony Thorpe & Steve Hillage	Youth & Tony Thorpe	System 7 & Adam Wren
7	"Big Sky City (High Rise Mix)" (original version on Power of Seven)	06:53	Derrick May & Steve Hillage	Derrick May & Steve Hillage	System 7 & Adam Wren
8	"Big Sky City (Jacob's Optical Staiway Mix)" (original version on Power of Seven)	04:44	Derrick May & Steve Hillage	Derrick May & Steve Hillage	Jacob's Optical Stairway 4 Reinforced Productions
9	"Interstate (Doc Scott Mix)" (original version on Power of Seven)	07:08	Steve Hillage & Miquette Giraudy	Steve Hillage & Miquette Giraudy	Doc Scott
10	"Sirènes (Marshall Jefferson Mix)" (original version on Point 3 - Fire Album)	05:53	Laurent Garnier & Steve Hillage	Laurent Garnier & Steve Hillage	Marshall Jefferson
11	"Sunburst (Atahualpa Mix)" (original version on System 7)	06:43	Alex Paterson, Steve Hillage & Miquette Giraudy	Youth & Steve Hillage	System 7 & Adam Wren

Tracks 1, 3, 9 and 10 had been previously released, track 1 is here shortened from its original 19 minute length. Tracks 8 and 11 were released on a promotional 12" in August 1996.

=== Bonus CD ===
(BLFCDL21, included as a bonus in BFLCD21X)

#	Track	Length	Written by	Produced by	Mixed by
1	"Sirènes (System 7.1)" (original version on Point 3 - Fire Album)	10:00	Laurent Garnier & Steve Hillage	Laurent Garnier & Steve Hillage	Carl Craig
2	"Interstate (Exploding Plastic Main Line)" (original version on Power of Seven)	11:07	Steve Hillage & Miquette Giraudy	Steve Hillage & Miquette Giraudy	David Holmes

Both tracks had been previously released.
