= Absolute Dissent =

Studio album by Killing Joke
- Released: 27 September 2010
- Recorded: Britannia Row Studios (London); The Dreaming Cave (London); Space Mountain Studio (Granada, Spain); Studio Faust (Prague, Czech Republic)
- Genre: Post-punk; industrial rock; industrial metal
- Length: 62:46
- Label: Spinefarm; Universal
- Producer: Killing Joke

Killing Joke chronology
Hosannas from the Basements of Hell (2006)	Absolute Dissent (2010)	MMXII (2012)

Singles from Absolute Dissent
- 1. "European Super State" Released: 20 September 2010

Absolute Dissent is the thirteenth studio album by English post-punk band Killing Joke, released on 27 September 2010 by Spinefarm Records, distributed worldwide by Universal Music Group.

Absolute Dissent is Killing Joke's first studio album in twenty-eight years to feature the band's original line-up, Jaz Coleman (vocals), Kevin "Geordie" Walker (guitar), Martin "Youth" Glover (bass guitar) and Paul Ferguson (drums), and also their first album following the death of their long-time bassist Paul Raven in 2007. Absolute Dissent was engineered and mixed by Clive Goddard, and produced by the band.

The album was released on various formats including CD, double coloured vinyl and a two-disc deluxe edition featuring a bonus disc entitled Absolute Respect containing cover versions of Killing Joke songs by Metallica, Amen, Helmet, Econoline Crush, Dead by April, Nine Inch Nails, The Mad Capsule Markets, Nouvelle Vague, Fear Factory, Foo Fighters and Kotiteollisuus.

== Recording and production ==
After meeting again in October 2007 at Paul Raven's funeral and sharing the feelings of mortality that Raven's passing gave to them, the original line-up of Killing Joke - Jaz Coleman, Geordie Walker, Youth and Paul Ferguson - decided to work together again as a unit and to record for the first time since 1982.

While rehearsing for gigs during the Summer of 2009, the band worked on new songs for the album. Coleman and Walker got a few more ideas together in Prague. Upon starting the album they had nine songs ready for the album, followed by another nine. The band wrote over twenty songs for the album. The record label was really impressed by their new material.

We have survived equipment being hi-jacked, tapes being withheld, nervous breakdowns, family bereavements, blood lettings, and a host of other challenges of Biblical proportions, But we are now at the final ascent, and I have to say it's one of the greatest albums I have ever had the privilege to be involved with… EVER! I have been living and breathing it for over four months now, and I'm still jaw-droppingly amazed at its power & beauty.

— Martin "Youth" Glover, Killing Joke's MySpace Blog

All members of Killing Joke participated in writing the lyrics and composing the music. The album was conceived and then recorded in London, Spain and Prague. It was engineered and mixed by Clive Goddard, and produced by the band themselves.

The album was originally going to be titled Feast of Fools.

== Music ==
Absolute Dissent features the sludgy sonic quality of their 2006 release Hosannas from the Basements of Hell, along with much of the same metal influence as their 2003 album Killing Joke and the melodic quality of earlier records such as of 1986's Brighter Than a Thousand Suns. Apocalypse, geopolitics, population, societal control are among the main themes in the album.

The album's second track, "The Great Cull", is another heavy metal song. Its lyrical content concerns Malthusianism, the Codex Alimentarius, water fluoridation and dopamine increased in the brain, chemtrails, malleable population, and mass control to maintain the population, preferably at around 500 million.

The third track, "Fresh Fever from the Skies", tells of an experience that happened to Coleman and about a hundred other people who saw seven luminous glowing objects in the sky when they were outside pubs in Ladbroke Grove, London.

"In Excelsis" was first released on 23 June 2010 on the extended play of the same name. It is an anthemic song, with simple drums and also featuring keyboards for the first time on the album.

The fifth track, "European Super State", was released as a single prior to the release of the album on 20 September 2010. The song, the most commercial track on the album, is stylistically a mixture of dance-punk, UK hard house and electronic body music. It is a continuation of their convictions about the "European dream".

The sixth track, "This World Hell (Die, Long Pig!)", is an industrial metal piece. The song is played without a click track, in one take. Lyrically it was inspired by Coleman's eldest daughter who turned him on to the work of Jean Ziegler, former professor of sociology at the University of Geneva and the Sorbonne, Paris, and United Nations Special Rapporteur on the Right to Food from 2000 to 2008. Among its lyrical concerns are food supply.

"Endgame" was first released on the In Excelsis EP. The lyrics are about several different themes, such as a pharmaceutical company (Baxter) that was caught sending the H1N1 virus to their sister company, as well as the Iraq War.

"The Raven King" started during a jam session. "It's not a song about Paul Raven", Coleman said in an interview with Rob Haynes for The Quietus, "it's about Raven's anger and things he felt passionately about. It's a song for Englishmen." "Carpe nocturno" is the last line of the song and also the last thing Raven said to Coleman in Prague when they met for the last time.

"Honour the Fire" was intended to be autobiographical and concerns the band's relationship with money.

"Depthcharge" is an industrial dance track. The lyrics are about impending environmental catastrophe.

"Here Comes the Singularity" details the 2012 phenomenon and technological singularity.

The closing track, "Ghosts of Ladbroke Grove", first released on the In Excelsis EP, is a moody piece, echoing the dub roots of their first EP, Turn to Red. Ladbroke Grove, a road in west London, is where generations of Coleman's family have lived. The music was composed first; Coleman went into the studio the day after and wrote the vocals. The whispering vocal is sung by Glover.

Well it's our tribal area, apart from we hate the way it's been developed. We miss all our old friends. That's where we started this, where generations of my family have lived, it was the first cosmopolitan experiment in this country. It's sacred land. It's where the second wave of punk started, from the punky reggae party where Don Letts brought punk together with Bob Marley, and the whole spring in punk's rhythm section changed from that point in that area. We used to rehearse there, The Clash would be upstairs rehearsing – we didn't used to speak to each other at that stage, but later I became great friends with Joe. We used to live in squats then. It was the only way you could afford to do your music. It was an area of dissenters and thinkers, and now it's just full of bankers and wankers.

— Jaz Coleman, Tomorrow's World: Jaz And Youth Play Us The New Killing Joke Album, The Quietus

Other songs such as "I Am War", "A Sick Sun", "Time Wave", "Suicide Tribe" and "Feast of Fools" were not featured on the album, but the band still plan to work on them and publish them in different editions of the album.

== Release ==
The album was released on 27 September 2010 in the United Kingdom and Japan, and on 1 October in Europe on Spinefarm Records, marking the 30th Anniversary for Killing Joke. It was released in the United States in November 2010 and distributed worldwide via Universal Music Group.

The album was released in various formats, including CD, double coloured vinyl, and a two-disc deluxe edition featuring a bonus disc entitled Absolute Respect, featuring covers of Killing Joke's songs by Metallica, Amen, Helmet, Econoline Crush, Dead by April, Nine Inch Nails, The Mad Capsule Markets, Nouvelle Vague, Fear Factory, Foo Fighters and Kotiteollisuus.

== Reception ==
Professional ratings
Aggregate scores
Source	Rating
Metacritic	79/100
Review scores
Source	Rating
AllMusic	4.5/5 stars
Alternative Press	3/5 stars
Classic Rock	4/5 stars
Drowned in Sound	8/10
Kerrang!	3/5 stars
Mojo	4/5 stars
Now	3/5 stars
PopMatters	8/10
Q	4/5 stars
Spin	7/10

Reception for Absolute Dissent was largely positive. Review aggregator Metacritic, which collates reviews from various publications, indicates a score of 79 ("Generally favorable") for the album.

John Doran of BBC Music wrote: "They easily manage to step out from the long shadow cast by their own first two albums on this close-to-genius release. [...] this is KJ at their distressingly original best." Dom Gourlay of the Drowned in Sound music webzine awarded the album eight stars out of ten, writing that "they've defied all expectations and created arguably their most definitive, and overtly complex body of work in decades. ... Absolute Dissent is a remarkable achievement for a band whose creative zenith appeared to have been locked in the annals many moons ago. [...] if this is the last time Killing Joke embark on a recording project together, they couldn't have concocted a more fitting finale."

Neil Gardner of British magazine Rock Sound wrote of the album: "Still angry, still vital", giving it seven stars out of ten. Darryl Sterdan of Canoe.ca gave the album a rating of 4/5. Phil Freeman of AllMusic gave the album four-and-a-half stars out of five, ending his review with: "it's damn nice to hear a band still operating at this level over 30 years into their career." Laura Wiebe of Exclaim! praised the album, writing: "The (post-)punk ethos is there, but this is heavy, intelligent rock, aggressive and insistent sometimes, but tempered by several laidback, reflective moments. And, in a way, it sounds like these four guys were never apart." Mike Schiller of PopMatters gave the album a rating of eight out of ten, writing: "the sound of Absolute Dissent is remarkably consistent—mostly straightforward rockers with some combination of tuneful singing and gravel-tinged bellowing over the top, well produced and tightly performed. There are a couple of low points, [...] but even those tracks pass fairly unassumingly." Q magazine gave the album a rating of four stars out of five, pointing out that "The post-punk provocateurs 13th album finds them straddling post-millennial metal and ritualistic pounding, Jaz Coleman still roaring like he's the only sane person in a world of fools". Mojo stated that "from the title track's monolithic defiance down, this one's an out-of-the-blue, anti-establishment classic", giving the album a rating of four stars out of five. Tim Klingbiel of leading Australian music website FasterLouder wrote: "Approaching controversial subjects such as population control, chemtrails, microchipping of the world's population and bioterrorism, Coleman's lyrics are fascinating as always, and he remains one of the few truly enigmatic and captivating frontmen in the world of modern music", summing up the record's impact by stating that "More than anything else, Absolute Dissent highlights exactly why Killing Joke remain so culturally relevant after over 30 years – far from being content to rest on their laurels, they continue to explore territory far beyond almost any other band today."

Less enthusiastic (though still positive) reviews were written by Kerrang!, Now and Alternative Press. Alternative Press pointed out that "instead of building on their strengths, frontman Jaz Coleman & Co. have backslid into the subdued sogginess of the band's mid-period".

In November 2010, Killing Joke were honoured with the trophy for Innovator at the Classic Rock Roll of Honour. The magazine ranked Absolute Dissent at number ten on its "album of the year" list. The album was listed at number ten in Terrorizer magazine's "Top 40 Albums of 2010" list. It reached number four in Metal Hammer's "Top 50 Albums of 2010" list. It came eighth in Revolver magazine's end-of-year list.

== Track listing ==
All tracks are written by Killing Joke (Jaz Coleman, Paul Ferguson, Martin "Youth" Glover and Kevin "Geordie" Walker).

No.	Title	Length
1.	"Absolute Dissent"	6:16
2.	"The Great Cull"	5:57
3.	"Fresh Fever from the Skies"	3:23
4.	"In Excelsis"	4:04
5.	"European Super State"	4:42
6.	"This World Hell"	5:27
7.	"Endgame"	4:42
8.	"The Raven King"	6:33
9.	"Honour the Fire"	5:50
10.	"Depthcharge"	4:17
11.	"Here Comes the Singularity"	5:04
12.	"Ghosts of Ladbroke Grove"	6:32

Deluxe edition bonus disc: Absolute Respect
No.	Title	Performer	Length
1.	"The Wait" (appears on The $5.98 E.P. - Garage Days Re-Revisited)	Metallica	4:55
2.	"Europe (BBC Live Version)" (appears on Too Hard to Be Free)	Amen	3:58
3.	"Primitive" (appears on Born Annoying)	Helmet	3:58
4.	"Pssyche" (appears on Purge)	Econoline Crush	4:58
5.	"Love Like Blood" (appears on Digital)	Dead by April	3:41
6.	"Democracy" (NIN Remix)" (appears on Wardance: The Remixes)	Killing Joke	7:24
7.	"Wardance" (appears on 010)	The Mad Capsule Markets	3:33
8.	"Pssyche" (appears on Nouvelle Vague)	Nouvelle Vague	4:12
9.	"Millennium" (appears on Transgression)	Fear Factory	5:26
10.	"Requiem (BBC Live Version)" (appears on The Colour and the Shape (Note: 10th Anniversary Edition))	Foo Fighters	3:33
11.	"Pandemonium" (appears on Murheen mailla II 2007–2014)	Kotiteollisuus	6:30

== Personnel ==
Killing Joke

- Jaz Coleman – vocals, synthesizer, production
- Kevin "Geordie" Walker – guitar, production
- Martin "Youth" Glover – bass guitar, synthesizer, production
- Paul Ferguson – drums, production

Additional personnel

- Reza Udhin – additional keyboards

Technical

- Clive Goddard – recording engineer and mixing
- Richard Nutting – additional mixing (track 8)
- Michael Rendell – additional engineering, keyboards and programming
- Joel Cormack – assistant recording engineer
- John Cox – assistant recording engineer
- Davide Venco – assistant recording engineer
- Thomas Stiehler – recording engineer (Prague vocal sessions)
- Derek Saxonmeyer – recording engineer (Prague vocal sessions)

== Charts ==
Chart (2010)	Peak position
Finnish Album Chart	37
French Albums Chart	113
UK Albums Chart	71
