= Exorcism (song) =

Song by Killing Joke

Single by Killing Joke

from the album Pandemonium
- A-side: "Exorcism (Live in King's Chamber, Cairo August 1993 Mix) Edit"; "Exorcism (A Germanic Interpretation)(Unification Catastrophe-Full Length Mandra Gora Remix)"
- B-side: "Whiteout (The Intellect is Ugly Remix)(Mandra Gora Edit)"; "Another Cult Goes Down (Protobello Mix)"; "Exorcism (The Bretonic Revenge)(Total Eclipse Remix Edit)"
- Released: 14 March 1994
- Genre: Industrial metal
- Length: 6:42 (album track); 28:36 (maxi single)
- Label: Butterfly Records
- Songwriters: Jaz Coleman; Kevin "Geordie" Walker; Martin "Youth" Glover
- Producers: Youth, Greg Hunter (additional production/engineering)

Killing Joke singles chronology
| "Change: The Spiral Tribe Mix/The Youth Mixes" (1992) | "Exorcism" (1994) | "Pandemonium" (1994) |

CD single release
- Exorcism CD Frontcover

12" single release
- Exorcism 45 RPM Side A

"Exorcism" is Killing Joke's first single from their ninth studio album, Pandemonium. It was released on 14 March 1994 by Butterfly Records.

"Exorcism", like "Money Is Not Our God", failed to chart on the UK Singles Charts.

== Background ==
In 1990, Killing Joke agreed to take a hiatus from writing studio material. Although the song "Change" was remixed by Martin "Youth" Glover in 1992, the band decided to take another year off until he was ready to return to the band. In an April 1994 MTV interview, after the release of Pandemonium, Jaz Coleman stated that he was "not together "walking the shores", if you like," during the 10-year period of Youth's absence and the relocation to Iceland (see: "Empire Song"), saying, "I feel that the difference between now and the early days is we feel more focused, we feel more in control of our own destinies, if we want to put out a record, we put out a record. We don't ask for permission from anyone and we decide things within our own group as individuals." In mid-1993, Killing Joke began writing new material, and in August of that year, they performed "Exorcism" for the first time live in Cairo, Egypt.

== Releases ==
"Exorcism" was released in several versions including remixes and live performances. The original album version was not featured on any of the releases.

The first release of "Exorcism" was a 10" and CD single, both on Butterfly Records, a label created by Glover. The A-side featured "Exorcism (Live in King's Chamber, Cairo August 1993 Mix) Edit" and "Exorcism (A Germanic Interpretation)(Unification Catastrophe-Full Length Mandra Gora Remix)", which was remixed by Mandra Gora (real name: Johann Bley). The B-side featured "Whiteout (The Intellect Is Ugly Remix)(Mandra Gora Edit)", "Another Cult Goes Down (Portobello Mix)" (later appearing on the 2005 reissue of Pandemonium) and "Exorcism (The Bretonic Revenge)(Total Eclipse Remix Edit)". The latter was remixed by Total Eclipse (real name: Stephane Holweck).

The second release of "Exorcism" was as an unofficial, limited-edition 12" single, also on Butterfly Records. It did not include "Another Cult Goes Down (Portobello Mix)".

== Reception ==
Ned Raggert of Allmusic described "Exorcism" as a "straight-ahead rampage" and said that it "shows that Killing Joke hasn't forgotten the power of sheer intensity, and if Ferguson's sheer power and inventiveness is missed the most here, the results are still a thrilling, fierce listen." Adrien Begrand of PopMatters praised "Exorcism": "[It] is every bit as vicious as Pandemonium is stately, a seven and a half-minute explosion of industrial-fused rage, Coleman commanding in his Lemmy-esque voice, 'Watch the ugliness rise… Let it out, let it rise,' punctuating the verses with vulgar hacks and coughs."

== Track listings ==
=== 10" single ===
Side A

1. "Exorcism (Live in King's Chamber Cairo August 1993 Mix) Edit" – 05:24
2. "Exorcism (A Germanic Interpretation) (Unification Catastrophe - Full Length Mandra Gora Remix)" – 07:30 (Note: Mixed by Mandra Gora)

Side B

1. "Whiteout (The Intellect Is Ugly Remix) (Mandra Gora Edit)" – 04:13
2. "Another Cult Goes Down (Portobello Mix)" – 06:17
3. "Exorcism (The Bretonic Revenge) (Total Eclipse Remix Edit)" – 06:12 (Note: Mixed by Total Eclipse)

=== 12" single ===
Side A

1. "Exorcism (Live in King's Chamber Cairo August 1993 Mix) Edit" – 05:24
2. "Exorcism (A Germanic Interpretation) (Unification Catastrophe - Full Length Mandra Gora Remix)" – 07:30

Side B

1. "Whiteout (The Intellect Is Ugly Remix) (Mandra Gora Edit)" – 04:13
2. "Another Cult Goes Down (Portobello Mix)" – 06:17
3. "Exorcism (The Bretonic Revenge) (Total Eclipse Remix Edit)" – 06:12

=== CD single ===
1. "Exorcism (Live in King's Chamber Cairo August 1993 Mix (Edit))" – 05:24
2. "Exorcism (A Germanic Interpretation) (Unification Catastrophe - Full Length Mandra Gora Remix)" – 07:30
3. "Whiteout (The Intellect Is Ugly Remix) (Mandra Gora Edit)" – 04:13
4. "Another Cult Goes Down (Portobello Mix)" – 06:17
5. "Exorcism (The Bretonic Revenge) (Total Eclipse Remix Edit)" – 06:12
