= Trevor Key =

British photographer and designer (1947–1995)

- Born: 10 July 1947; Hull
- Died: 6 December 1995 (aged 48); London
- Website: trevorkey.com

John Trevor Key (10 July 1947 – 6 December 1995) was a British photographer and designer, best known for his work for musical artists of the 1970s and 1980s. One of his best-known covers was for Mike Oldfield's 1973 debut album Tubular Bells. Other artists that he produced cover artwork for include Joy Division, Sex Pistols, Phil Collins, Roxy Music, Wham!, Can, China Crisis, System 7, Orchestral Manoeuvres in the Dark, and New Order.

Key was also involved in logo design and was credited with designing the Virgin Group signature logo with Ray Kyte. Key was also associated with Peter Saville and Factory Records.

Key was married to Lesley and they had a child. He died of a brain tumour in December 1995.

== Music artwork ==
Key's music cover artwork included:

- Mike Oldfield – Tubular Bells (1973)
- Mike Oldfield – Hergest Ridge (1974)
- Link Wray – “Beans and Fatback” (1973)
- Mandalaband – Mandalaband (1975)
- Lady June – Lady June's Linguistic Leprosy (1975)
- Can – Unlimited Edition (1976)
- Keith Hudson – Too Expensive (1976)
- Robin Trower – Robin Trower Live (1976)
- Mike Oldfield – Incantations (1978)
- Mike Oldfield – Platinum (1979)
- Sex Pistols – The Great Rock 'n' Roll Swindle (1979)
- Joy Division – "Love Will Tear Us Apart" (1980)
- Pauline Murray and the Invisible Girls – Pauline Murray and The Invisible Girls (1980)
- Pauline Murray and the Invisible Girls – "Dream Sequences" (1980)
- Orchestral Manoeuvres in the Dark – Organisation (1980)
- The Distractions – Nobody's Perfect (1980)
- Ultravox – "The Thin Wall" (1981)
- Jack Bruce, Bill Lordan & Robin Trower – B.L.T. (1981)
- Chris De Burgh – Best Moves (1981)
- Phil Collins – Face Value (1981)
- Phil Collins – Hello, I Must Be Going! (1982)
- Midge Ure – No Regrets (1982)
- Roxy Music – "Take a Chance with Me" (1982)
- China Crisis – Difficult Shapes & Passive Rhythms, Some People Think It's Fun to Entertain (1982)
- China Crisis – "No More Blue Horizons" (1982)
- Howard Devoto – Jerky Versions of the Dream (1983)
- Gardening by Moonlight – "Method in the Madness" (1983)
- Orchestral Manoeuvres in the Dark – "Genetic Engineering (1983)
- New Order – "Thieves Like Us" (1984)
- New Order – "Murder" (1984)
- Section 25 – From the Hip (1984)
- Jethro Tull – Under Wraps (1984)
- Wham! – "Wake Me Up Before You Go-Go" (1984)
- Orchestral Manoeuvres in the Dark – "Tesla Girls" (1984)
- New Order – Low-Life (1985)
- New Order – "State of the Nation" (1986)
- New Order – Brotherhood (1986)
- New Order – "Bizarre Love Triangle" (1986)
- Peter Gabriel – So (1986)
- Peter Gabriel – "Don't Give Up" (1986)
- Wham! – Music from the Edge of Heaven (1986)
- John Waite – Rover's Return (1987)
- New Order – "True Faith" (1987)
- New Order – "Touched by the Hand of God" (1987)
- New Order – "Fine Time" (1988)
- New Order – "Blue Monday" (1988)
- New Order – "Round & Round (Remix)" (1989)
- New Order – Technique (1989)
- Phil Collins – ...But Seriously (1989)
- Orchestral Manoeuvres in the Dark – "Then You Turn Away" (1991)
- Orchestral Manoeuvres in the Dark – Sugar Tax (1991)
- Martin Hannett – Martin, The Work of Martin Hannett (1991)
- Mike Oldfield – Heaven's Open (1991)
- Mike Oldfield – "Heaven's Open" (1991)
- Mike Oldfield – "Sentinel" (1992)
- Mike Oldfield – Tubular Bells II (1992)
- Phil Collins – Both Sides (1993)
- Ultramarine – United Kingdoms (album) (1993)
- System 7 – 777 (1993)
- System 7 – Point 3 (Fire and Water albums) (1994)
- New Order – "True Faith 94" (1994)
- Ultramarine – "Hymn" (1995)
- New Order – The Rest of New Order (1995)
- New Order – "1963" (1995)
