= Democracy (album) =

Studio album by Killing Joke
- Released: 1 April 1996
- Recorded: Henley-on-Thames, Oxfordshire, England
- Genre: Industrial rock; post-punk; alternative rock
- Length: 54:14
- Label: Butterfly/Big Life
- Producer: Youth

Killing Joke chronology
Pandemonium (1994)	Democracy (1996)	Killing Joke (2003)

Singles from Democracy
- 1. "Democracy" Released: 11 March 1996

Democracy is the tenth studio album by English post-punk band Killing Joke, released on 1 April 1996 by Butterfly Records and Big Life.

== Recording and production ==
Following their successful 1994 Pandemonium album and tour, Killing Joke reconvened in Cornwall, U.K. to write new material before moving on to Henley-on-Thames, Oxfordshire to record a new album. Production was overseen by bassist Martin "Youth" Glover, with session musician Geoff Dugmore returning once more on drums. Dugmore shared mutual friends with the band hence joining the group. Stage keyboardist Nick Holywell-Walker was also brought in to add some additional synthesizer and programming.

Singer and keyboard player Jaz Coleman had spent some time decompressing at the end of the Pandemonium tour in Sedona, Arizona, where he had been inspired by a new interest in Native American culture, striking a chord with his previous involvement in Māori culture in New Zealand, where he had settled in 1991. This resulted in a more optimistic and New Age-tinged album lyrically and marked the beginning of a more settled period for Coleman, who had by now also made considerable progress with his orchestral career.

The album sessions supposedly culminated in a full moon drumming fire ceremony on a small island on the river Thames at Henley, with Youth reportedly braving the murky waters for a naked swim.

Coleman and guitarist Geordie Walker have both expressed their disappointment with the resulting album, blaming their decision to allow Youth to mix it without their involvement.

After a short tour in the summer of 1996, the band entered their longest career hiatus to date, lasting until 2002, when they began work on what would become their second eponymously titled album.

== Release ==
Democracy was released on 1 April 1996 by Youth's record label Butterfly Records in conjunction with Big Life, on CD and cassette. It reached number 71 in the UK Albums Chart.

One single, the title track "Democracy", was released on 11 March 1996. It reached number 39 in the UK Singles Chart.

The album was reissued in remastered form in 2005 by Cooking Vinyl featuring one bonus track, a 17-minute trance remix of "Democracy".

== Reception ==
Professional ratings
Review scores
Source	Rating
AllMusic	3/5 stars
The Encyclopedia of Popular Music	3/5 stars
Entertainment Weekly	C+
MusicHound Rock	3.5/5 stars
NME	4/10
PopMatters	mixed
Rock Hard	9.0/10.0
Trouser Press	unfavourable
Select	2/5 stars

Critical response to Democracy has been generally mixed. Adrien Begrand of PopMatters commented that on the album "the band sounds watered down". Trouser Press called the album "the wrong kind of joke – either Midnight Oil with a raspy singer or James Hetfield attempting to hijack U2 – complete with inane lyrics about 'Prozac People', 'Intellect' and 'Another Bloody Election'. Vote with your feet." Jack Rabid of AllMusic, on the other hand, called it "Killing Joke's best album in [eleven] years". In Germany, the album garnered “record of the month” status in at least two magazines (Metal Hammer and Rock Hard).

== Track listing ==
All tracks are written by Jaz Coleman, Youth and Geordie Walker.

No.	Title	Length
1.	"Savage Freedom"	4:52
2.	"Democracy"	3:39
3.	"Prozac People"	6:54
4.	"Lanterns"	4:53
5.	"Aeon"	8:05
6.	"Pilgrimage"	6:29
7.	"Intellect"	4:00
8.	"Medicine Wheel"	5:18
9.	"Absent Friends"	5:40
10.	"Another Bloody Election"	4:27

2005 CD reissue bonus track
No.	Title	Length
11.	"Democracy" (The Russian Tundra Mix)	17:52

== Personnel ==
Killing Joke

- Jaz Coleman – vocals, synthesizer
- Kevin "Geordie" Walker – guitar
- Martin "Youth" Glover – bass guitar, production, mixing

Additional personnel

- Geoff Dugmore – drums
- Nick Holywell-Walker – additional synthesizer & programming

Technical

- Andy Scarfe – recording engineer (tracks 2–10)
- Paul Wright – mixing (tracks 2–10)
- Ott – recording engineer (track 1)
- Killing Joke – mixing (track 1)
- Mike Coles – cover design

== Charts ==
Year	Chart	Peak position
1996	UK Albums Chart	71
