= Feel the Passion (disambiguation) =

"Feel the Passion" is a song by Albanian singer Aurela Gaçe. It may also refer to:

- "(Can You) Feel the Passion" by Blue Pearl
- "Feel the Passion" song by Steel Pulse, from 1991 album Victims (Steel Pulse album)
