= (Can You) Feel the Passion =

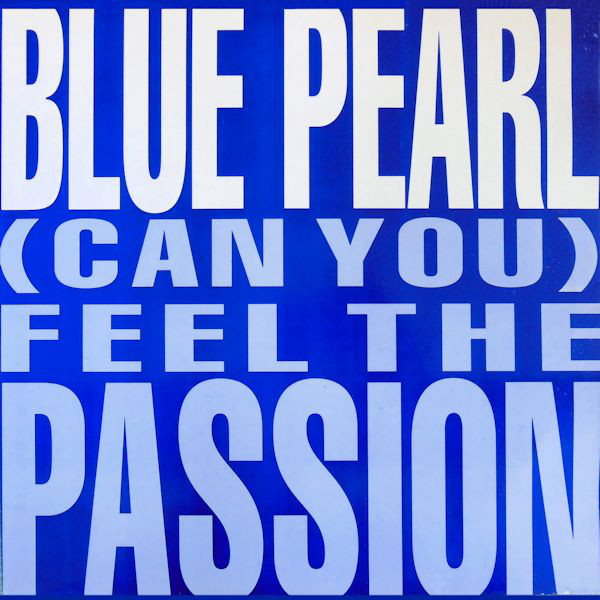

Single by Blue Pearl
- Released: 1991 (UK); 1992 (US)
- Recorded: 1991
- Genre: Dance; house
- Length: 3:25
- Label: Big Life/SBK Records
- Songwriters: Durga McBroom; Martin Glover
- Producer: Martin Glover

Blue Pearl singles chronology
"Alive" (1991)	"(Can You) Feel the Passion" (1991)	"Mother Dawn" (1992)

"(Can You) Feel the Passion" is a song recorded, written, and produced by American/British group Blue Pearl. Released in 1991, by Big Life/SBK Records the single is to date the act's second best known song after "Naked in the Rain". "(Can You) Feel the Passion" had better success in the United States, hitting No. 1 on both the Billboard Hot Dance Club Play chart and the Music Week UK Dance Singles chart in 1992, while reaching No. 14 on the UK Singles Chart.

== Background ==
The single is done in a spoken word type manner by lead singer Durga McBroom, while the hook, riffs, and chorus melody written by Durga was augmented by Youth on the keyboards, and samples from Bizarre Inc's "Playing with Knives". Ironically, club DJs have used both "(Can You) Feel the Passion" and "Playing With Knives" in their bootleg mashups due to the former providing the lyrics and the latter's piano-heavy house feel.

== Track listing ==
- CD maxi (US)
1. "(Can You) Feel the Passion" (Youth Mix) (5:48)
2. "(Can You) Feel the Passion" (U.S. Mix) (3:25)
3. "(Can You) Feel the Passion" (Adrenalin Mix) (5:35)
4. "(Can You) Feel the Passion (House Mix)" (6:23)
5. "(Can You) Feel the Passion (Zen Mix)" (6:03)

== Charts ==
Chart (1991–1992)	Peak position
Australia (ARIA)	166
Belgium (Ultratop 50 Flanders)	34
Ireland (IRMA)	24
Netherlands (Dutch Top 40 Tipparade)	12
Netherlands (Single Top 100)	49
Sweden (Sverigetopplistan)	32
UK Singles (OCC)	14
UK Airplay (Music Week)	14
UK Dance (Music Week)	1
US Hot Dance Club Play (Billboard)	1

== See also ==
- List of number-one dance singles of 1992 (U.S.)
