= Power of Seven =

Power of Seven may refer to:

- Power of Seven (album), an album by System 7
- Power of Seven (publisher), a digital music content publisher
- Power of Seven (Goals), the annihilation of Manchester United by Liverpool on 5 March 2023
