= Pandemonium (Killing Joke album) =

Studio album by Killing Joke
- Released: 25 July 1994
- Studios: Townhouse Studios (London); Metropolis Studios (London); Butterfly Studios (London); York Street Studio (Auckland, New Zealand); EMI Studios (Cairo, Egypt); Hani Mehana Studios (Cairo, Egypt); The King's Chamber, Great Pyramid (Cairo, Egypt)
- Genres: Industrial metal; post-punk
- Length: 62:37
- Label: Butterfly/Zoo
- Producers: Youth; Greg Hunter

Killing Joke chronology
Extremities, Dirt and Various Repressed Emotions (1990)	Pandemonium (1994)	Democracy (1996)

Singles from Pandemonium
- 1. "Exorcism" Released: March 1994; 2. "Millennium" Released: April 1994; 3. "Pandemonium" Released: July 1994; 4. "Jana" Released: January 1995

Pandemonium is the ninth studio album by English post-punk band Killing Joke, released on 25 July 1994 by Butterfly Records. The album marked Killing Joke's return after a four-year hiatus, the longest the band had taken since it was founded. It also featured the return of founding member Youth, who replaced Paul Raven on bass.

== Content ==
The vocal tracks for "Pandemonium", "Exorcism" and "Millennium" were recorded in the King's Chamber of The Great Pyramid of Giza. The session was filmed by director Shaun Pettigrew and features in the Killing Joke documentary The Death And Resurrection Show (2013) which also details alleged paranormal experiences during the recording.

Frontman Jaz Coleman considered Pandemonium to be a conceptual album on the external influence of Arabic music, which was spread throughout the album. It also incorporated his perspective on life, which is apparent in songs such as "Labyrinth" and "Pleasures of the Flesh".

A track called "Hallucinations of a Cynic" was also recorded, but left off the album.

The title track, as well as "Communion" and "Whiteout", would become live staples of the band.

== Release ==
Pandemonium was released in July 1994 by Youth's record label Butterfly Records.

The singles "Millennium" and "Pandemonium" both reached the UK top 40 and the album is the band's best selling work.

It was reissued in remastered form in 2005, featuring two additional tracks: a remix of "Another Cult Goes Down" and an experimental dub remix of "Pandemonium". The original version of "Another Cult Goes Down" has remained unreleased.

In 2020, Spinefarm Records reissued Pandemonium as part of the band's 40th anniversary.

== Reception ==
Professional ratings
Review scores
Source	Rating
AllMusic	3/5 stars
Collector's Guide to Heavy Metal	7/10
The Encyclopedia of Popular Music	4/5 stars
Kerrang!	4/5
PopMatters	7/10
MusicHound Rock	2.5/5 stars
Select	3/5 stars

Pandemonium has been generally moderately-well received by critics.

Kerrang! magazine wrote, "Gargantuanly heavy, catchy and hilarious at turns, Pandemonium yokes pounding slabs of techno-metal to Coleman's cosmic visions, to exhilarating, trance-inducing effect". Trouser Press described it as "a significant upgrade from Extremities, Dirt and Various Repressed Emotions".

The Guardian described the album as a return to form for the band.

== Track listing ==
All tracks are written by Killing Joke (Jaz Coleman, Youth and Geordie Walker).

No.	Title	Length
1.	"Pandemonium"	6:42
2.	"Exorcism"	7:26
3.	"Millennium"	5:34
4.	"Communion"	6:56
5.	"Black Moon"	5:19
6.	"Labyrinth"	5:55
7.	"Jana"	4:06
8.	"Whiteout"	5:43
9.	"Pleasures of the Flesh"	5:42
10.	"Mathematics of Chaos"	7:24

2005 CD reissue bonus tracks
No.	Title	Length
11.	"Pandemonium" (A Thread of Steel in the Suspension Bridge of Time and Space Mix)	9:18
12.	"Another Cult Goes Down" (Portobello Mix)	6:19

== Personnel ==
Killing Joke

- Jaz Coleman – vocals, synthesizer
- Kevin "Geordie" Walker – guitar
- Martin "Youth" Glover – bass guitar, production, mixing

Additional personnel

- Geoff Dugmore – drums
- Tom Larkin – drums
- Larry De Zoete – drums
- Hossam Ramzy – percussion
- Said El Artist – percussion
- Aboud Abdel Al – violin
- Matt Austin – programming
- Paddy Free – programming

Technical

- Greg Hunter – production, engineering, mixing
- Ron Saint Germain – mixing
- Sameh Almazny – engineering assistance
- Natalie Heath – engineering assistance
- Matt Howe – engineering assistance
- Sheldon Isaac – engineering assistance
- Mike Coles – cover design

== Charts ==
Chart (1994)	Peak position
UK Albums Chart	16
U.S. Billboard Heatseekers	39
