= Golden Section (album) =

Studio album by System 7
- Released: July 1997 UK; September 1997 North America; June 1998 Japan; May 2000 UK re-release
- Recorded: 1997
- Length: 78:34
- Label: Butterfly/Big Life BLFCD27 UK; Hypnotic (Cleopatra) CLP108-2 North America; Flavour Japan; A-Wave AAWCD006 UK re-release
- Producer: Steve Hillage, Miquette Giraudy

System 7 chronology
Power of Seven (1996)	Golden Section (1997)	Seventh Wave (2001)

Professional ratings
Review scores
Source	Rating
AllMusic	3/5 stars
NME	0/10
The Plain Dealer	B

Golden Section is an album by the British ambient dance band System 7, released in 1997.

== Critical reception ==
The New York Times wrote that "System 7 makes cheerful midtempo dance music that usually relies on a bouncy, chugging beat ... Removed from the dance floor, the music has too little happening for too long." The Dallas Observer thought that "tracks like 'Exdreamist' are nothing more than psychedelia wrapping itself in drum 'n' bass beats and electronic ambience." The Plain Dealer concluded: "Dreamy, smooth and stimulating, this is sacred music for digital temples."

== Track listing ==
#	Track	Length	Written & produced by	Mixed by
1	"Rite of Spring"	08:56	Steve Hillage and Miquette Giraudy	System 7 and Adam Wren
2	"Don Corleone"	08:36	Steve Hillage, Talvin Singh and Miquette Giraudy	System 7 and Adam Wren
3	"Y2K (Beatnik Mix)"	05:14	Steve Hillage and Miquette Giraudy	System 7 and Adam Wren
4	"Ring of Fire"	09:49	Steve Hillage and Miquette Giraudy	System 7 and Adam Wren
5	"Exdreamist"	07:31	Steve Hillage and Miquette Giraudy	System 7 and Adam Wren
6	"Wave Bender"	06:37	Steve Hillage and Miquette Giraudy	System 7 and Adam Wren
7	"Sinom X Files"	07:56	Steve Hillage and Miquette Giraudy	System 7 and Adam Wren
8	"Merkaba!"	09:51	Steve Hillage and Miquette Giraudy	System 7 and Adam Wren
9	"Y2K (Back to the Future)"	06:38	Steve Hillage and Miquette Giraudy	System 7 and Adam Wren
10	"Borobudur"	07:37	Steve Hillage and Miquette Giraudy	System 7 and Adam Wren
