= Seventh Wave =

For the wave phenomenon, see sneaker wave.

Seventh Wave may also refer to:

- Seventh Wave (band), a British progressive rock band
- Seventh Wave (Annie Crummer album)
- Seventh Wave (GrimSkunk album)
- Seventh Wave (System 7 album)
- "Seventh Wave", the opening track on Devin Townsend's album Ocean Machine: Biomech
- "Love Is the Seventh Wave", a song on Sting's album The Dream of the Blue Turtles
- A fictional arms dealer group in the video game Black
