= Change (Killing Joke song) =

Song by Killing Joke

Single by Killing Joke
- B-side: "Tomorrow's World"
- Released: 17 March 1980
- Genre: Post-punk
- Length: 9:28
- Label: Malicious Damage
- Songwriters: Jaz Coleman, Kevin "Geordie" Walker, Martin "Youth" Glover, Paul Ferguson
- Producer: Killing Joke

Killing Joke singles chronology
"Wardance" (1980)	"Change" (1980)	"Requiem" (1980)

"Change: Spiral Tribe Mix"

Single by Killing Joke
- B-side: "Requiem (A Floating Leaf Always Reaches the Sea Dub Mix)"
- Released: 1992
- Genre: Post-punk
- Label: E.G.
- Songwriters: Jaz Coleman, Kevin "Geordie" Walker, Martin "Youth" Glover, Paul Ferguson
- Producer: Killing Joke

Killing Joke singles chronology
"Money Is Not Our God" (1991)	"Change: Spiral Tribe Mix" (1992)	"Exorcism" (1994)

"Change" is a song by English post-punk band Killing Joke that appeared on the US release of their 1980 self-titled debut album. The song bears a resemblance to the War song "Me and Baby Brother", which Killing Joke have acknowledged. DFA Records cofounder Tim Goldsworthy stated that the song was the key inspiration to the composition of his record label artist James Murphy on LCD Soundsystem's debut single "Losing My Edge".

== Release ==
A version of the song recorded at a John Peel session on 5 March 1980 was issued that month as a limited-edition promotional single, available at gigs and without advertisement from the band's Malicious Damage label. The B-side was a version of "Tomorrow's World" (originally on Killing Joke's debut album) recorded at the same Peel session. These two versions later appeared on the 2008 compilation The Peel Sessions 1979–1981.

The song then appeared on the US release of the band's October 1980 debut album. This same version of "Change" was released as the B-side of the band's single "Requiem".

"Change" and "Requiem" were remixed in 1992 by Martin Glover, who had recently rejoined the band. "Change: The Youth Mixes" was released in 1992 on CD by E.G. Records and also as a CD maxi single by Virgin Records.

Another set of remixes by Spiral Tribe was released as "Change (Spiral Tribe Mixes)" in 1992 on CD and 12" vinyl by E.G. Records. A cassette release combining the main Spiral Tribe Mix with three remixes by Youth was also released, simply titled "Change".

== Track listing ==
=== 7-inch single ===
1. "Change" – 3:58
2. "Tomorrow's World" – 5:30

=== CD single ("Change: The Youth Mixes") ===
1. "Change (Re-Evolution 23 Mix)" – 3:58
2. "Requiem (Malicious Damage Mix)" – 3:51
3. "Change (Instrumental Mix)" – 4:00
4. "Requiem (Full Moon Instrumental Mix)" – 3:43

All tracks remixed by Youth. Remix engineer (tracks 1 and 3): John Brough. Remix engineer (tracks 2 and 4): Chris Potter

=== CD single ("Change: Spiral Tribe Mixes") ===
1. "Change (Spiral Tribe Mix)" – 6:39
2. "Change (Spiral Trance Mix)" – 6:39
3. "Requiem (A Floating Leaf Always Reaches the Sea Dub Mix)" – 10:54

Tracks 1 and 2 remixed by Spiral Tribe. Track 3 remixed by Thrash and Greg Hunter.

=== Cassette single ("Change") ===
Side A

1. "Change (Re-Evolution 23 Mix)" – 3:58
2. "Change (Spiral Tribe Mix)" – 6:39

Side B

1. "Requiem (Malicious Damage Mix)" – 3:51
2. "Requiem (Acapella Dub)" – 3:48

Tracks A1, B1 and B2 remixed by Youth. Track A2 remixed by Spiral Tribe. Remix engineer (track A1): John Brough. Remix engineer (tracks B1 and B2): Chris Potter.
