= Pandemonium (song) =

Song by Killing Joke

Single by Killing Joke

from the album Pandemonium
- Released: 4 July 1994
- Genre: Industrial metal
- Length: 6:41
- Label: Butterfly
- Songwriter(s): Jaz Coleman, Kevin "Geordie" Walker, Martin "Youth" Glover
- Producer(s): Youth, Greg Hunter

Killing Joke singles chronology
"Exorcism" (1994)	"Pandemonium" (1994)

"Pandemonium" (also known as "The Pandemonium Single") is a song by Killing Joke, released in 1994 by Butterfly Records as the third single from their 1994 studio album of the same name.

== Release ==
"Pandemonium" was released in July 1994 by Butterfly Records as the third single from the band's 1994 studio album of the same name. It peaked at No. 28 in the UK Singles Chart on 16 July 1994.

== Track listing ==
12"
No.	Title	Length
1.	"Pandemonium (The Dragonfly Mix)"
2.	"Pandemonium (Cybersank Extended Remix)"
3.	"Requiem (A Floating Leaf Always Reaches the Sea Mix)"
4.	"Pandemonium (Waxworth Industries Mix)"

CD
No.	Title	Length
1.	"Pandemonium (Cybersank Edit)"
2.	"Pandemonium (Original Edit)"
3.	"Pandemonium (Waxworth Industries Mix)"
4.	"Pandemonium (Cybersank Extended Remix)"
5.	"Pandemonium (The Dragonfly Mix)"

== Charts ==
Year	Chart	Peak Position
1994	UK Singles Chart	28
