= Killing Joke (2003 album) =

Studio album by Killing Joke
- Released: 28 July 2003
- Recorded: 2002–2003
- Studios: The Beauchamp Building (London); Grand Master (Los Angeles)
- Genres: Industrial metal; post-punk
- Length: 59:28
- Labels: Zuma; Epic; Columbia
- Producer: Andy Gill

Killing Joke chronology
Democracy (1996)	Killing Joke (2003)	Hosannas from the Basements of Hell (2006)

Singles from Killing Joke
- 1. "Loose Cannon" Released: 17 July 2003; 2. "Seeing Red" Released: 6 October 2003

Killing Joke (also known as Killing Joke 2003) is the eleventh studio album by English rock band Killing Joke, released on 28 July 2003 through Zuma Recordings. It was their first album in seven years, following Democracy in 1996, and their second self-titled album, following their debut in 1980. The album was produced by Andy Gill (Gang of Four) and all drums were performed by guest Dave Grohl (Nirvana, Foo Fighters), a long-time Killing Joke fan.

Critical reviews were largely positive, noting the band's move towards a heavier sound, and the album peaked at number 43 in the UK Albums Chart.

== Background and recording ==
Vocalist Jaz Coleman and Dave Grohl originally intended to title the album Axis of Evil, in reference to the political lyrical themes: "It's the beginning of the American Empire. They're taking over the world. That's what's happening, and here we are at the heart of the fucking enemy. I never thought I'd see the day." The Death & Resurrection Show, the title of the opening song on the album, was also a working title.

Bassist Paul Raven had recently met Grohl, who expressed an interest in working with the band. According to Coleman, "The original idea was to have three of our favourite drummers play on the album, Dave [Grohl] being one of them. We also wanted John [Dolmayan] from System of a Down and Danny [Carey] from Tool. But when Dave heard the songs, he said, 'I want the whole thing'". Dolmayan worked with the band during early recording sessions, but the drumming on the final album is entirely by Grohl. Grohl declined to be paid for his work. The drum recording sessions took five days in March 2003.

The album was produced by Andy Gill of Gang of Four and mostly recorded at his Beauchamp Building studio in London. The drums were recorded at Grand Master Studios in Los Angeles. Grohl's drum parts were adapted from drum machine patterns Gill and the band created. During the recording of the song "Asteroid", Dave Grohl commented on the album:

It's the first record I've ever done where the drums come last. Usually drums are first. It's nice, though, because once you put the drums down and all the percussion is done and everything, it's done. You have a finished song. And also, all the programming and stuff that Andy is doing, the rhythms that they came up with are great. It's not conventional "rock drumming", it's not like conventional rock rhythms. It's challenging. Everything is a challenge.

Most of the bass guitar is played by original member Youth, with contributions by the band's other long-time bassist Paul Raven. Youth said "The reason we brought Raven back in to do one track was because I didn't want to tour it. He was prepared to tour it but wanted to be part of the album if he was gonna tour it". Guitarist Geordie Walker originally claimed to have played "half the bass on the record." but later said "Not much at all. I think I just added a lower bass-line to 'Loose Cannon'." Grohl did not play live with the band; the drummer on the supporting tour was Ted Parsons, formerly of Swans, Prong and Godflesh.

== Release ==
Killing Joke was released on 28 July 2003 through Zuma, Epic Records, and Columbia Records.

In 2020, Spinefarm Records reissued Killing Joke as part of the band's 40th anniversary.

== Critical reception ==
Professional ratings
Aggregate scores
Source	Rating
Metacritic	79/100
Review scores
Source	Rating
AllMusic	4/5 stars
Alternative Press	5/5 stars
Blender	3.5/5 stars
The Encyclopedia of Popular Music	4/5 stars
Mojo	4.5/5 stars
Playlouder	5/5 stars
Q	2/5 stars
Rolling Stone	2/5 stars
Stylus	A−
Uncut	4/5 stars

The album received positive reviews from critics. On review aggregator website Metacritic, it holds an average review score of 79/100, based on 15 reviews, indicating "generally favourable reviews".

Joshua Klein of Billboard awarded the album an 80 out of 100, noting that "Grohl's furious playing fits perfectly with the wall of rage erected by Joke vocalist Jaz Coleman and fellow founders Geordie Walker on guitar and Youth on bass". John Robb of Playlouder wrote that the album "may well be the best rock record you'll hear all year".

A negative review came from Rolling Stone, who awarded the album 2 stars out of 5 and wrote that "all the humorless gloom and doom feels oppressive after a while". Q also gave a score of 2 out of 5, stating that the album was "patchy".

In 2005, Killing Joke was ranked number 355 in Rock Hard magazine's book The 500 Greatest Rock & Metal Albums of All Time.

== Track listing ==
All tracks are written by Jaz Coleman, Youth, Geordie Walker and Andy Gill.

No.	Title	Length
1.	"The Death & Resurrection Show"	6:56
2.	"Total Invasion"	5:28
3.	"Asteroid"	3:24
4.	"Implant"	5:18
5.	"Blood on Your Hands"	6:00
6.	"Loose Cannon"	4:12
7.	"You'll Never Get to Me"	6:19
8.	"Seeing Red"	5:27
9.	"Dark Forces"	6:26
10.	"The House That Pain Built"	6:13

US CD bonus track
No.	Title	Music	Length
11.	"Wardance" (re-recording)	Coleman, Walker, Glover, Paul Ferguson	3:49

UK CD bonus track
No.	Title	Length
11.	"Inferno"	3:38

Japan CD bonus tracks
No.	Title	Length
11.	"Inferno"	3:38
12.	"Zennon"	5:38

== Personnel ==
Killing Joke

- Jaz Coleman – vocals, synthesizer
- Kevin "Geordie" Walker – guitar, bass guitar ("Loose Cannon")
- Martin "Youth" Glover – bass guitar
- Paul Raven – bass guitar (one track)
- Dave Grohl – drums

Additional personnel

- Andy Gill – additional guitar feedback
- Katie Summers – voice (track 2)

Technical

- Andy Gill – recording engineer, producer
- Jerry Kandiah – recording engineer
- Nick Raskulinecz – recording engineer (L.A. drum sessions)
- Alex Alekel – assistant engineer (L.A. drum sessions)
- Clive Goddard – mixing
- Milk – cover design

== Charts ==
Chart (2003)	Peak position
Dutch Albums (Album Top 100)	100
French Albums (SNEP)	108
German Albums (Offizielle Top 100)	65
Scottish Albums (Official Charts)	50
UK Albums (Official Charts)	43
US Independent Albums (Billboard)	30
