= Echotape =

English rock band

- Origin: Wallop, Hampshire
- Genres: Indie rock
- Years active: 2010–present
- Members: Marc Burford, Dan Bowman, Mike Burford, Joe Stickland
- Website: www.echotape.co.uk

Echotape are an English indie rock band from Wallop, Hampshire.

The band refer to themselves as "the DIY band". Drummer Mike Burford explained "We realised we were going to have to do everything ourselves because we were not going to get straight away the major label backing and financial help".

After obtaining a grassroots following, the band attracted the attention of Killing Joke bassist and producer Martin Glover (Youth). Glover invited the band to his studio in Spain, where he produced their debut album, Collective in 2013. Their debut single, "Unstable" was a top 200 hit on US college radio.

The band have a strong DIY ethic, and produce their own videos, releasing them on YouTube, and photos on Instagram. The band have since toured the UK and Ireland, including an appearance at the Blissfields Festival in Winchester.

== Discography ==
- Collective (2013)
- "Pushing Your Faith/the Weak" (2013)
- "We Should Feel Like We Are in Love" (2014)
- "Whiskey Bar" (2014)
- "See You Soon" (2015)
- "All My Days" (2015)
- "Wicked Way" (2016)
- "This Could Be Anything" (2017)
