= Hosannas from the Basements of Hell =

Studio album by Killing Joke
- Released: 3 April 2006
- Recorded: Studio Faust (Prague, Czech Republic)
- Genre: Industrial metal; post-punk
- Length: 62:23
- Label: Cooking Vinyl
- Producer: Killing Joke

Killing Joke chronology
| Killing Joke (2003) | Hosannas from the Basements of Hell (2006) | Absolute Dissent (2010) |

Singles from Hosannas from the Basements of Hell
- 1. "Hosannas from the Basements of Hell" Released: 2006; 2. "Invocation"/"Implosion" Released: 2006

Hosannas from the Basements of Hell is the twelfth studio album by English post-punk band Killing Joke, released on 3 April 2006 by Cooking Vinyl.

== Recording ==
The album title refers to the location of the album recording. The band recorded the album in "Hell", the darkest basement studio at Studio Faust Records, run by Richard "Faust" Mader in Prague, Czech Republic. It was engineered by Jerry Kandiah, who also worked on the band's previous, self-titled, album. They made extensive use of Faust's vintage recording equipment from the late 1970s to achieve the atmosphere of the album. It was mixed by Mark Lusardi, who previously worked with the band on their very first release, Turn to Red, in 1979. Originally the sessions were meant to last 3 months, but this got greatly extended.

This was Killing Joke's last studio album to feature bassist Paul Raven, who died in October 2007.

== Artwork ==
The cover artwork is taken from a painting by Russian artist Victor Safonkin entitled Inhuman Rearing. The artwork featured in the inside booklet is taken from Society of Good Inventions and Hidden Aims by the same painter.

== Release ==
Hosannas from the Basements of Hell was released on 3 April 2006 by Cooking Vinyl. It reached number 72 in the UK Albums Chart.

The track "Hosannas from the Basements of Hell" was released as the album's first single, and reached number 72 in the UK Singles Chart. The tracks "Invocation" and "Implosion" were also released on a promo CD-R, both receiving radio air time.

== Reception ==
Professional ratings
Review scores
| Source | Rating |
|---|---|
| AllMusic | 4/5 stars |
| Blabbermouth.net | 9.5/10 |
| The Encyclopedia of Popular Music | 3/5 stars |
| Kerrang! | 4/5 |
| PopMatters | 8/10 |

Hosannas from the Basements of Hell received acclaim upon release. David Jeffries of AllMusic said "the Joke sound absolutely free and grand here, allowing songs to stretch well past the five-minute mark and just begging the detractors to have at it by sitting firm on their classic delivery", adding that "newcomers may find this all too much to take in, while old fans can cherish the band's most personal album as another victory." Adrien Begrand of PopMatters called the album "everything we’d ever want from a Killing Joke record" and "their finest album in well over a decade".

Keith Bergman, writer for Blabbermouth.net, described the album as "perfect post-millennial music, the sound of a world merrily driving itself off the deep end. Killing Joke are a primal scream of humanity drowning in a tsunami of man-made disorder, headed straight to Hell and laughing the whole way down, like Slim Pickens riding the A-bomb at the end of Dr. Strangelove. You won't find a more blown-out, wild-eyed freakout on the record store shelves any time soon."

Paul Brannigan, editor for Kerrang! magazine, argued "Out of step with the world they might well be, but Killing Joke's righteous frenzy still feels horribly necessary."

== Track listing ==
All tracks are written by Jaz Coleman, Geordie Walker and Paul Raven.

| No. | Title | Length |
|---|---|---|
| 1. | "This Tribal Antidote" | 4:15 |
| 2. | "Hosannas from the Basements of Hell" | 5:52 |
| 3. | "Invocation" | 7:54 |
| 4. | "Implosion" | 6:41 |
| 5. | "Majestic" | 5:40 |
| 6. | "Walking with Gods" | 8:36 |
| 7. | "The Lightbringer" | 9:38 |
| 8. | "Judas Goat" | 6:21 |
| 9. | "Gratitude" | 7:04 |

Japan CD bonus track
| No. | Title | Length |
|---|---|---|
| 10. | "Universe B" | 6:13 |

== Personnel ==
Killing Joke

- Jaz Coleman – vocals, synthesizer, string arrangement & recording, production
- Kevin "Geordie" Walker – guitar, production
- Paul Raven – bass guitar, production
- Benny Calvert – drums, production

Additional personnel

- Tashkent Strings – string section (track 3)
- Ronnie Barak – percussion (track 3)
- Reza Udhin – effects, atmospheres (track 6)

Technical

- Jerry Kandiah – recording engineer
- Mark Lusardi – mixing
- Victor Safonkin – cover paintings
- Paul Raven – serpent logo design

== Charts ==
| Chart (2006) | Peak position |
|---|---|
| UK Albums Chart | 72 |
| France | 173 |
