= 777 (System 7 album) =

Studio album by System 7
- Released: March 1993
- Recorded: September 1992
- Studio: Butterfly Studios
- Genre: Techno; trance; ambient
- Length: 58:20
- Label: Big Life
- Producer: Steve Hillage, Miquette Giraudy, Youth, Tony Thorpe, The Orb, Lewis Keogh

System 7 chronology
System 7 (1991)	777 (1993)	Point 3 (1994)

Singles from 777
- 1. "7:7 Expansion" Released: 1993; 2. "Sinbad / Quest" Released: 1993

777 is the second studio album by English electronic music group System 7, originally released by Big Life in the United Kingdom in 1993. The album was released in the United States by Hypnotic Records in 1998, after having been unavailable in the country, and was later re-released through System 7 member Steve Hillage's A-Wave label in 2003.

After establishing themselves as ambient house producers in the early 1990s, System 7 recorded 777 at Butterfly Studios in September 1992, sharing the album's name with the 1992 American version of their first studio album, System 7. Compared to the group's ambient-styled debut album, 777 has a stronger emphasis on dance music, incorporating styles of techno and trance. The record also features collaborations with The Orb and producer Youth. Released at the height of the popularity of ambient music in the UK, 777 peaked at number 30 on the UK Albums Chart, and received critical acclaim.

== Production and composition ==
In the 1990s, musician Steve Hillage and his former Gong bandmate Miquette Giraudy formed System 7, an ambient house group who operated more as a recording collective than a band. The formation of the group was inspired by Hillage befriending Alex Paterson of the Orb, who played Hillage's Rainbow Dome Musick (1979) at the Heaven nightclub in London while Hillage was there. Paterson persuaded Hillage to record ambient house music with his guitar as prominent in the mix as it had been in his solo work. System 7's debut single "Sunburst" was released in late 1990, followed by debut album System 7 (1991) which featured collaborations with acts like Derrick May. The group then signed to Astralwerks in the United States who released System 7 there in 1992 with the new name 777.

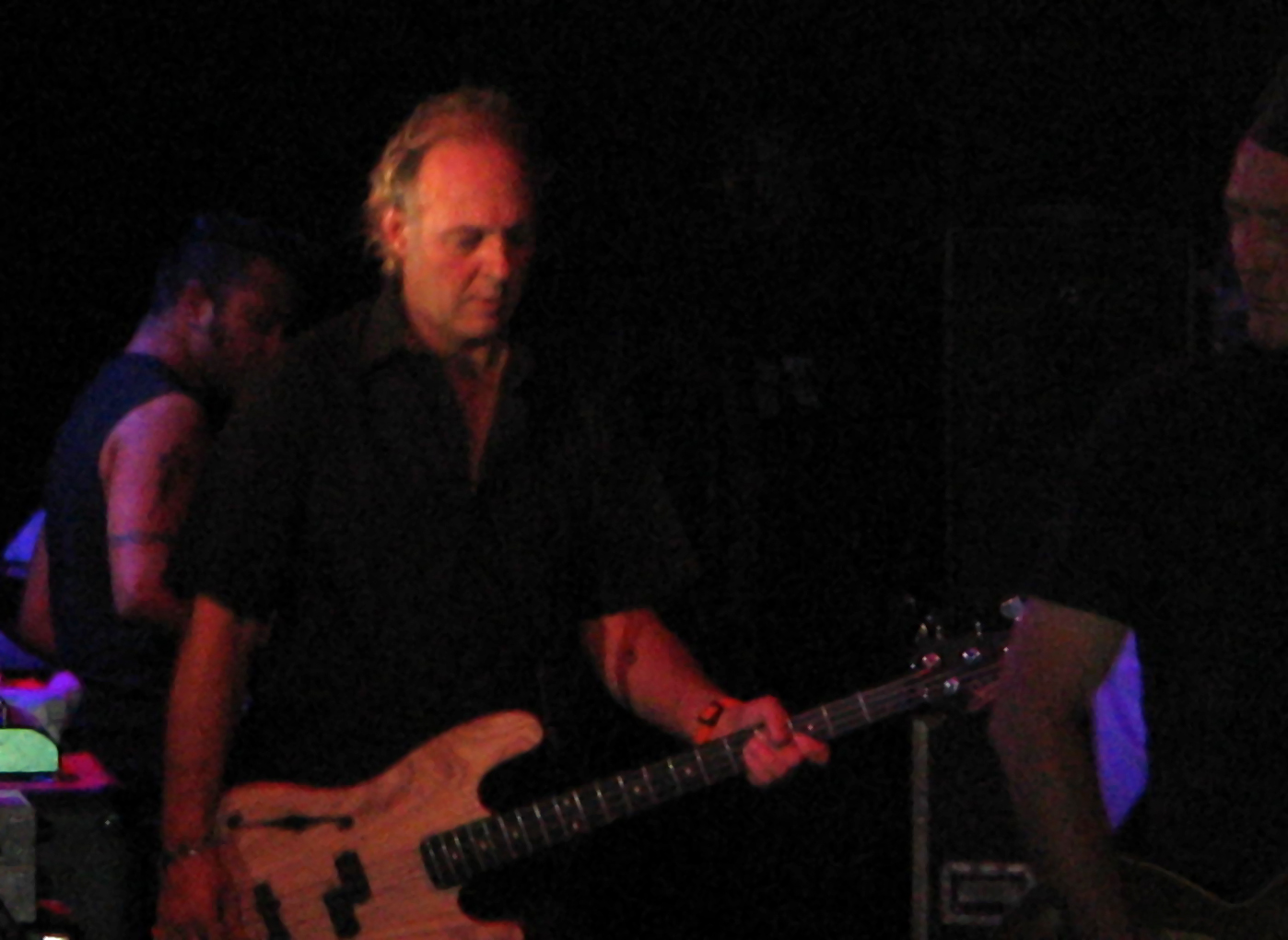
Youth (pictured here with Killing Joke) provided co-production and mixing on "7:7 Expansion".

After releasing the standalone singles "Freedom Fighters" and "Attitude," System 7 began preparing for their second album. They named it 777, sharing its name with the 1992 American release of their debut album. The group had been briefly known as 777 when a rock band named System Seven complained, but System 7 reverted to their original name after System Seven dissolved. System 7 recorded 777 at Butterfly Studios in September 1992, with recording assistance from Jody Sherry, Neal Snyman and Scruff. "7:7 Expansion" features additional co-producing and mixing from Youth, and is the only track on the album not to feature Giraudy. The Orb feature on "A Cool Dry Place", with Alex Paterson providing "ambience & navigation" and Kris Weston featuring on keyboards alongside Giraudy. The Orb also co-produced and mixed the track.

Unlike the ambient pop of System 7's early work, 777 moves the group towards straightforward techno, contributing to what biographer John Bush felt was "a completely different work than the earlier LP." The album places an stronger emphasis on dance music than its predecessor, with "its feet firmly on the dancefloor" according to writer Ben Hogwood. Candy Absorption of Rough Guides wrote that, compared to System 7's debut album, 777 saw the group's "blissed-out trance textures and rhythms take over." Ben Hogwood of Resident Advisor cites "Sinbad" as proof that "Steve Hillage and Miquette Giraudy know how to make a crowd dance." "Quest" and "7:7 Expansion" also feature "solidly rocking grooves." "A Cool Dry Place" features a soundscape style.

== Release and reception ==
Professional ratings
Review scores
Source	Rating
AllMusic	3/5 stars
Resident Advisor	8/10
Select	3/5 stars
The Virgin Encyclopedia of Dance Music	4/5 stars

777 was released in the United Kingdom by Big Life Records in March 1993. It reached number 30 on the UK Albums Chart, spending two weeks on the chart in total, and it remains their most successful album on the chart. Absorption felt the album's British Top 40 success was because it was released at the peak of "ambient fervour" in the region. The artwork for 777 features photography from Trevor Key with design and art direction from David James Associates. Key's photograph for the cover depicts an early, primitive version of the typeface Metsys used for the band's name; the type and effects are part of the original photograph and were not added to the image in post-production. The liner notes and back cover use Gerstner Original, a typeface with a "fluid, techy and sci-fi quality" similar to Metsys.

"7:7 Expansion" was released as the album's first single in February 1993, and it reached number 39 on the UK Singles Chart, becoming the band's first and highest charting single. A double A-side of "Sinbad" and "Quest" was issued as the album's second and final single in June, and it reached number 74 on the chart. Although System 7 wanted to release 777 in the United States, the record went unreleased the country until Cleopatra Records and Hypnotic Records re-released the album there in 1998. After Hillage acquired the rights to 777 and other System 7 albums, he re-released 777 on his label A-Wave on 26 May 2003.

In a contemporary review, Rupert Howe of Select described 777 as taking the "directionless jumble" of the group's debut and "[hammering] some kind of form out of Hillage's druidic fantasies." He wrote that the collaborations with The Orb and Youth were the album highlights, both offering what he described as a "rhythmic toughness that drops out of the later trips through the Hillage fretboard repertory." Andrew Boyd of the Reading Evening Post expressed disappointment that the group "abandoned the vocals which enlivened many of the best tracks on their debut album," instead making an album of "Orb-like meanderings" that are "very pleasant, but no more than that." While Dave Simpson of Melody Maker described 777 as sounding like the Orb, whom he said Hillage "virtually invented" with his album Rainbow Dome Musick (1979), he conceded it was a "fine LP" which he hoped would achieve commercial success. John Bush of AllMusic highlighted "7:7 Expansion" and "Sinbad" as among the best tracks on 777 in a retrospective review. In a review of the 2003 reissue, Ben Hogwood of Resident Advisor wrote that 777 had "stood up well" as a result of its emphasis on dance music, and felt that "Sinbad" alone was proof that the System 7 reissues held "value." He also wrote that the reissues of 777 and other albums by the group would remind listeners "of the surprising weight and influence that System 7 hold within dance music."

== Track listing ==
No.	Title	Writer(s)	Length
1.	"7:7 Expansion"	Martin Glover, Steve Hillage, Tony Thorpe	10:03
2.	"A Cool Dry Place"	Miquette Giraudy, Hillage, Alex Paterson, Kris Weston	8:18
3.	"Desir (Ghost Mix)"	Giraudy, Hillage, Lewis Keogh	7:47
4.	"On the Seventh Night"	Giraudy, Hillage	7:32
5.	"Sinbad"	Giraudy, Hillage	8:00
6.	"Quest (Moon Mix)"	Giraudy, Hillage	6:41
7.	"Ship of the Desert"	Giraudy, Hillage	9:46
8.	"Faydeaudeau"	Giraudy, Hillage	7:21

1998 re-release bonus track
No.	Title	Writer(s)	Length
9.	"Expansion (Double Edged Sword Mix)"	Glover, Hillage, Thorpe	10:10

"Quest (Moon Mix)" was not included on the early versions of the album.

== Personnel ==
Credits adapted from liner notes.

- Steve Hillage – production, guitar, keyboards, programming
- Miquette Giraudy – production, keyboards, programming
- Youth – production, keyboards
- Tony Thorpe – production, keyboards
- The Orb – production
- Lewis Keogh – production, keyboards
- Matt Austin – programming
- Kris Weston – keyboards
- Alex Paterson – ambience, navigation

== Charts ==
Chart	Peak position
UK Albums (OCC)	30
