= Killing Joke (1980 album) =

Studio album by Killing Joke
- Released: October 1980
- Recorded: August 1980
- Studios: Marquee, London
- Genres: Post-punk; industrial rock
- Length: 35:10
- Labels: E.G.; Polydor
- Producer: Killing Joke

Killing Joke chronology
Turn to Red (1979)	Killing Joke (1980)	What's THIS For...! (1981)

Singles from Killing Joke
- 1. "Wardance" Released: February 1980; 2. "Requiem" Released: September 1980

Killing Joke is the debut studio album by English post-punk band Killing Joke, released in October 1980 by E.G. via Polydor Records. It debuted at number 41 on the UK Albums Chart on 25 October 1980 and later peaked at number 39.

== Background and recording ==
Singer and keyboardist Jaz Coleman met drummer Paul Ferguson in late 1978. In February 1979, they put an announcement in Melody Maker with the words: "Bass, lead, to tell the killing joke, we mean it man ! Total exploitation, no information, anonymity". They soon recruited guitarist Geordie Walker and then bassist Youth. After releasing a few singles, they recorded Killing Joke in August 1980 at Marquee Studios in London, shortly after a small tour promoting the Almost Red EP.

The album was self-produced by the band on purpose. They only wanted an engineer "who can put their technical knowledge into what we want, the way we want it. He's got to take us as we are". They recorded it live in the studio as "basic" as possible with "no overdubs to speak of"; Ferguson explained, "The mixing is where the difference is". Engineer Phil Harding reckons the recording of the album might have only taken two weeks. The album's lyrics were written by Coleman and Ferguson expressing their opinions on issues such as politics, death, hypocrisy, human nature, pollution and exile.

The artwork was based on a photograph by Don McCullin of young rioters trying to escape from clouds of CS gas released by the British Army in Derry, Northern Ireland, on 8 July 1971 during the Troubles. The original picture was taken a few months before the day now known as Bloody Sunday that took place in the same town in early 1972.

== Release ==
Killing Joke was released in October 1980 by E.G. Records, who were distributed at the time by Polydor Records. It entered the UK Albums Chart on 25 October 1980, and eventually reached number 39.

The album produced two singles: "Wardance" and "Requiem".

The 2005 and 2008 reissues of Killing Joke featured several bonus tracks, such as previously released B-sides and demo tracks. as it was in the original US release.

In 2020, Spinefarm Records reissued Killing Joke as part of the band's 40th anniversary.

== Reception ==
It got slagged off by everybody and then eight years later we were told it was a ground-breaking record. People are fickle and you have to stand by your own creations.

— Jaz Coleman

Professional ratings
Review scores
Source	Rating
AllMusic	4.5/5 stars
The Austin Chronicle	3/5 stars
The Encyclopedia of Popular Music	4/5 stars
Mojo	5/5 stars
MusicHound Rock	5/5 stars
Select	5/5
Sounds	5/5 stars
Uncut	9/10

In his retrospective review, Bradley Torreano of AllMusic praised the album, writing, "Since 1980, there have been a hundred bands who sound like this, but before Steve Albini and Al Jourgensen made it hip, the cold metallic throb of Killing Joke was exciting and fresh", calling it an "underground classic" that "deserves better than its relative unknown status". In the band's biography it was called an "outstanding debut album which captured not only their defining sound, but also the chilling apocalyptic anguish about the world to come."

Sputnikmusic called it a "post-punk masterpiece of tribal funk-rock and grinding heavy metal with suitably doom-mongering lyrics and splenetic vocals". In 2019, Pitchfork placed the album at No. 9 on their "33 Best Industrial Albums of All Time" list. The music critic Chuck Eddy has praised the album for its "surprisingly potent gridlock-plot avant-drone somberness, layers of fuzz over kamikaze electrobongos", and has highlighted the US bonus track "Change", commenting that its music "marches the children of Ozzy's grave into land minds of dub".

== Legacy ==
The album has been called "an underground classic" for fans of "heavy music". Dave Grohl has cited it as one of his favorite albums. "The Wait" was covered by Metallica on The $5.98 E.P. - Garage Days Re-Revisited EP in 1987 and was later featured on Garage Inc. "Primitive" was covered by Helmet in 1993 as the A-side to their "Primitive" single, and later added to their Born Annoying compilation album. "Requiem" was covered by Foo Fighters in 1997 as a B-side to the "Everlong" single. Prong frontman Tommy Victor has praised Killing Joke, stating, "There is nothing phony, gimmicky or pretentious about this record or this band. Simplicity: powerful riffs and gang choruses over undeniable grooves. Nobody, nobody, did this before. Pure innovation."

Japanese band The Mad Capsule Markets covered "Wardance" on their 2001 album "010". Scar the Martyr covered "Complications" as a bonus track on the Japanese and deluxe editions of their 2013 self-titled "Scar the Martyr" album.

The album was included in the book 1001 Albums You Must Hear Before You Die.

== Track listing ==
All lyrics are written by Jaz Coleman, Paul Ferguson; all music is composed by Killing Joke (Coleman, Geordie Walker, Youth, Paul Ferguson), except as noted.

Side A
No.	Title	Music	Length
1.	"Requiem"		3:45
2.	"Wardance"		3:49
3.	"Tomorrow's World"		5:31
4.	"Bloodsport"	Walker; Glover; Ferguson	4:46

Side B
No.	Title	Length
5.	"The Wait"	3:45
6.	"Complications"	3:08
7.	"S.O.36"	6:52
8.	"Primitive"	3:37

Re-issue bonus tracks
No.	Title	Length
9.	"Change"	4:01
10.	"Requiem" (Single version)	3:47
11.	"Change" (dub)	4:00
12.	"Primitive" (Rough mix)	3:35
13.	"Bloodsport" (Rough mix)	4:50

Note: The original US release featured the track "Change" in between tracks "Complications" and "S.O.36".

== Personnel ==
Killing Joke

- Jaz Coleman – lead vocals, synthesizer, production
- Kevin "Geordie" Walker – guitar, production
- Martin "Youth" Glover – bass guitar, production
- Paul Ferguson – drums, backing vocals, production

Technical

- Phil Harding – recording engineer, mixing (uncredited)
- Mike Coles – sleeve design (uncredited)
- Don McCullin – photography (uncredited)

== Charts ==
Year	Chart	Peak position
1980	UK Albums Chart	39
