= Power of Seven (album) =

Studio album by System 7
- Released: February 1996; November 2000 UK re-release
- Recorded: 1995
- Length: 58:20
- Label: Butterfly/Big Life BLFCD16 UK; Distance SUB 4805.2 France; R&S 96091 Europe; Sony Music (Japan) SRCS 8006 Japan; Hypnotic (Cleopatra) CLP6809 North America; A-Wave AAWCD004 UK re-release
- Producer: System 7

System 7 chronology
Point 3 (1994)	Power of Seven (1996)	Golden Section (1997)

Professional ratings
Review scores
Source	Rating
Allmusic	4.5/5 stars
Muzik	4.5/5 stars

Power of Seven — or, as represented in typographic artwork on its packaging, Power of Seven^{7} — is the fifth studio album by British electronic music band System 7.

== Track listing ==
#	Track	Length	Written by	Produced by	Mixed by
1	"Interstate"	5:46	Steve Hillage, Miquette Giraudy, Klaus Dinger and Michael Rother	Steve Hillage and Miquette Giraudy	Steve Hillage and Adam Wren
2	"Civilization"	6:28	Carl Craig, Steve Hillage and Miquette Giraudy	Carl Craig for Planet E Com	Carl Craig
3	"Davy Jones' Locker"	11:48	Alex Paterson, Steve Hillage and Miquette Giraudy	Alex Paterson and Steve Hillage	Alex Paterson, Steve Hillage and Adam Wren
4	"Big Sky City"	9:30	Derrick May and Steve Hillage	Derrick May and Steve Hillage	Derrick May
5	"Good Morning"	6:31	Steve Hillage and Miquette Giraudy	Steve Hillage and Miquette Giraudy	Steve Hillage and Adam Wren
6	"Night Owl"	7:49	Lewis Keogh, Steve Hillage and Miquette Giraudy	Lewis Keogh and Steve Hillage	Lewis Keogh, Steve Hillage and Adam Wren
7	The Osmosis Suite: "To the Power of Seven"	6:07	Steve Hillage and Miquette Giraudy	Steve Hillage and Miquette Giraudy	Mickey Mann and Steve Hillage
8	The Osmosis Suite: "Hanger 84"	6:10	Steve Hillage and Miquette Giraudy	Steve Hillage and Miquette Giraudy	Steve Hillage and Adam Wren
9	The Osmosis Suite: "Chicago Indian"	5:20	Steve Hillage and Miquette Giraudy	Steve Hillage and Miquette Giraudy	Steve Hillage and Adam Wren
10	"Mektoub"	7:09	Youth and Steve Hillage	Youth	Youth
11	"Europa"	5:05	Steve Hillage and Miquette Giraudy	Steve Hillage and Miquette Giraudy	Steve Hillage and Adam Wren
