= Durga McBroom =

American singer, songwriter, and actress

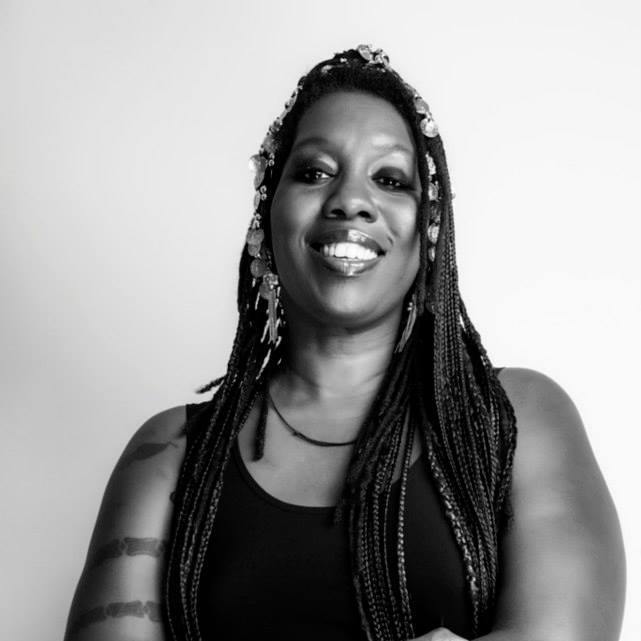
- McBroom in 2015

Background information
- Born: October 16, 1962 (age 64); Los Angeles, California, U.S.
- Genres: Rock; house; techno
- Occupations: Singer; musician; actress
- Instruments: Vocals; keyboards
- Years active: 1987–present
- Label: Mooremapp

Durga McBroom is an American singer who has performed backing vocals for Pink Floyd and is a member of the house music band Blue Pearl, best known for their hit single "Naked in the Rain". She works as an actress, dancer, and singer in the United States and internationally.

== Career ==
After working as an actress (most notably playing "Heels" in the 1983 blockbuster Flashdance), dancer, and singer, McBroom and her sister Lorelei McBroom worked with Pink Floyd as backing vocalists. She went on to have a long stint with them, being the only backing vocalist to appear consistently on all of their shows starting from the November 1987 concert at Omni Arena of A Momentary Lapse of Reason Tour up to the final concert of The Division Bell Tour in October 1994. She also performed on their appearance at the 1990 Knebworth festival and has provided vocals for the Pink Floyd live albums Delicate Sound of Thunder, and Pulse, and the Pink Floyd studio albums The Division Bell, and The Endless River, as well as David Gilmour's 2001 solo tour.

=== Blue Pearl ===
Around 1989, McBroom formed the band Blue Pearl with record producer Youth, singing, playing some keyboards and co-writing all of their material. As part of Blue Pearl, she had several hit songs in the early 1990s, including "Naked in the Rain" (UK #4 in July 1990), "Little Brother" (UK #31 in October 1990), and a cover version of Kate Bush's "Running Up That Hill", all taken from the album Naked, released in 1990 on the Big Life label. Subsequent singles included "(Can You) Feel the Passion" (UK #14 in January 1992) Can You Feel The Passion had better success in the United States, hitting No. 1 on both Billboard's Hot Dance Club Play chart and the UK Dance Chart.

=== Other activities ===
She provided backing vocals to the song "Don't Wait That Long" featured on the James album Seven released in 1992. She also sang a duet on "Mother Dawn" with Billy Idol for his Cyberpunk album, a self-penned song that was originally released as a Blue Pearl single. In addition, she sang backing vocals on several other songs on Cyberpunk, including a featured performance on "Heroin", and participated in "No Religion" tour.

In addition to her music career, McBroom performed as an actress in the movies Flashdance, The Rosebud Beach Hotel, the episode "Lullabye" of the TV show Hunter (with Gary Sinise), and several other less notable appearances. She also appears in many videos, including "California Girls", "Yankee Rose" and "Just a Gigolo" for David Lee Roth; "Would I Lie To You" for Eurythmics; "Day In, Day Out" for David Bowie and "When I Think of You" for Janet Jackson.

In April 2010, she started to work with the Argentinian band "The End Pink Floyd" show in Buenos Aires, including some appearances with Guy Pratt and Jon Carin. In October 2011, McBroom joined her sister Lorelei to sing "The Great Gig in the Sky" in Anaheim, California with the Australian Pink Floyd Show. 2017 saw her reunite with Gary Wallis, Scott Page, and Claudia Fontaine in several Italian shows.

She tours the world singing with various bands (Shpongle Live / May 3–4, 2019). She also recorded a second Blue Pearl album with Youth, which has yet to be released. Currently she's touring the world with her own Pink Floyd tribute band, Pink Floyd Legacy.

February 2020 saw her return to the big screen in the controversial film Sammy-Gate, premiering in the Netherlands at IFFR (Rotterdam). She and her sister Lorelei are also featured on Steve Hackett's album At the Edge of Light, being featured on the chart-topping single "Underground Railroad", as well as on the single "Wingbeats" from his subsequent album,"Surrender Of Silence". A single written with Graziano Regoli and Vittorio De Scalzi (New Trolls) called "American Big Top" came out in June 2020 on Supa Qween Records, a fiery protest song reflective of the times. Another album, Black Floyd, was recorded with her sister Lorelei (co-produced by Dave Kerzner), and released in July 2020 as The McBroom Sisters. It includes some cover songs as well as original material. She also continued her acting career in the film Naples to New York, directed by Academy Award-winning Italian director Gabriele Salvatores, released in 2024.

== Personal life ==
McBroom was married to Mark Hudson from May 10, 2008, until his death on July 5, 2015.

Following his death, she moved to Rome, Italy in 2017.

== See also ==
- Pink Floyd live backing musicians
