= Eagulls =

English rock band

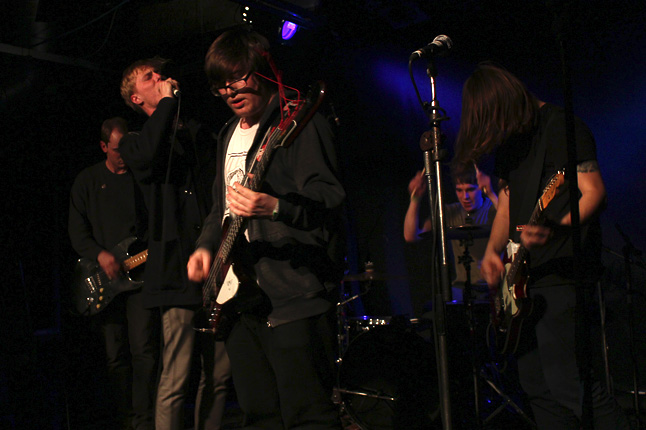
- Eagulls in 2011.

Background information
- Origin: Leeds, West Yorkshire, England
- Genre: Post-punk
- Years active: 2009–2018
- Label: Partisan
- Members: Mark 'Goldy' Goldsworthy; Henry Ruddel; Liam Matthews; Tom Kelly; George Mitchell

Eagulls were an English rock band, formed in Leeds in 2009. The band consisted of Mark Goldsworthy (guitar), Henry Ruddel (drums), Liam Matthews (guitar), Tom Kelly (bass), and George Mitchell (vocals).

== History ==
Eagulls were formed in 2009 and released their first single 'Council Flat Blues' on Moshi Moshi imprint Not Even Records. The band's 2012 self-titled EP, recorded by MJ of Hookworms, was released on both London's Sexbeat label and Canadian label Deranged Records. In 2013 the band signed to Partisan Records, releasing 7" single "Nerve Endings" with a cover of Killing Joke's 'Requiem', and 7" single 'Tough Luck' (with 'Opaque' on the 7" as well). Their self-titled debut album has been released in March 2014.

The band have received sustained press attention, such as from the NME, The Guardian, Loud and Quiet, Vice, Stereogum, Yorkshire Evening Post, and internationally, such as from The Fader and Pitchfork Media. They were BBC Radio 6's Steve Lamacq's New Favourite Band in 2013. They have played in the UK and Europe with notable artists including Manic Street Preachers, Flipper, Milk Music, Ceremony, Iceage, Hot Snakes, and Pulled Apart By Horses, and in the United States for South by Southwest in Texas and New York's CMJ festivals. In 2014 they appeared on the Late Show with David Letterman, performing their song 'Possessed' for Bill Murray. The band were chosen as the main support for Franz Ferdinand's 2014 UK tour.

In May 2016, the band released their second album, Ullages, on Partisan Records. Produced by Matt Peel, the title is an anagram of the band's name.

In May 2021, singer George Mitchell confirmed during an interview that he left the band "a few years back". He is now a painter and has started a new musical project called "Honesty".

== Musical style and influences ==
Critics have categorised Eagulls' music as post-punk.

Eagulls cited influences including the Cure, Bauhaus, Public Image Ltd., Dinosaur Jr., Siouxsie and the Banshees, the Clash and Sex Pistols.

== Discography ==
=== Studio albums ===
Title	Details	Peak chart positions
Title	Details	UK
Eagulls	Released: 3 March 2014; Label: Partisan; Format: LP, CD, Digital download	86
Ullages	Released: 13 May 2016; Label: Partisan; Format: LP, CD, Digital download	133

=== EP & Singles ===
- Songs Of Prey - Kirky's Records, Cassette (2010)
- Council Flat Blues - Moshi Moshi Records/Not Even Records, 7" (2011)
- Eagulls/Mazes split - Italian Beach Babes, 7"/MP3 (2011)
- Eagulls EP - Deranged Records/Sexbeat, 12"/MP3 (2012)
- Nerve Endings - Partisan Records, 7"/MP3 (2013)
- Tough Luck/Opaque - Partisan Records, 7"/MP3 (2013)
