= Requiem (Killing Joke song) =

Song by Killing Joke

Single by Killing Joke

from the album Killing Joke
- B-side: "Change"; "Requiem" (demo)
- Released: 26 September 1980
- Recorded: August 1980
- Studio: Marquee Studios (London)
- Genre: Post-punk; gothic rock
- Length: 3:42
- Label: E.G.; Malicious Damage
- Songwriter(s): Jaz Coleman; Paul Ferguson; Martin Glover; Kevin Walker
- Producer(s): Killing Joke

Killing Joke singles chronology
"Change" (1980)	"Requiem" (1980)	"Follow the Leaders" (1981)

"Requiem" is a song by the English post-punk band Killing Joke. It was released in September 1980 by E.G. Records as the second single from their first studio album, Killing Joke.

== Release ==
"Requiem" was released on 26 September 1980 on 7" vinyl by E.G. Records and Malicious Damage as the second single from the band's first album, backed by the B-side "Change". A 12" version of the single was also released, with "Change" and a demo of "Requiem" as the B-sides.

The single did not chart in the UK, but it reached number 1 on the UK Indie Chart and 43 on the US Billboard Dance Club Songs chart.

== Cover versions ==
The song was covered in 1997 by the American rock band Foo Fighters as one of the B-sides to their song "Everlong", and was included in the 2007 re-release of their album The Colour and the Shape.

The British industrial metal band Godflesh performed "Requiem" live on their 2001 tour in support of their album Hymns For that tour, the group was accompanied by the Killing Joke bass guitarist Paul Raven and, in one instance, by the Killing Joke singer Jaz Coleman.

Requiem was covered by the British post-punk band Eagulls in 2013 as the B-side to their "Nerve Endings" single, which received a limited release on 7" vinyl.

The French band LANE (Love and Noise Experiment), created by ex-members of the Thugs and Daria, two bands from Angers, performed it live during its 2018 tour, and then recorded a studio version in 2019 that can be found on Spotify.

== Track listing ==
=== 7" vinyl ===
- E.G. / Malicious Damage — EGMD 1.0

Side A
No.	Title	Length
1.	"Requiem"	3:42

Side B
No.	Title	Length
1.	"Change"	3:58

=== 12" vinyl ===
- E.G. / Malicious Damage — EGMDX 1.0

Side A
No.	Title	Length
1.	"Requiem"	3:42

Side B
No.	Title	Length
1.	"Change"	3:58
2.	"Requiem" (Malicious Demo 2)	3:42

== Personnel ==
- Jaz Coleman – lead vocals, synthesizer, lyrics, production
- Geordie Walker – guitar, production
- Youth – bass guitar, production
- Paul Ferguson – drums, backing vocals, production

== Charts ==
Chart (1980)	Peak position
US Hot Dance Club Songs (Billboard)	43

== Release history ==
Region	Date	Label	Format	Catalogue no.
United Kingdom	26 September 1980	E.G.; Malicious Damage	7"	EGMD 1.0
United Kingdom	26 September 1980	E.G.; Malicious Damage	12"	EGMDX 1.0
