= System 7 (album) =

Studio album by System 7
- Released: September 1991
- Recorded: 1991
- Genres: Ambient; ambient house; space rock; sound collage; dance; ambient pop
- Length: 66:27
- Labels: Ten Records (Virgin); DIXCD 102 CD; DIXG102 2 x 12"
- Producer: System 7

System 7 chronology
System 7 (1991)	777 (1993)

Professional ratings
Review scores
Source	Rating
AllMusic	4/5 stars
New Musical Express	5/10
Select	3/5 stars
The Virgin Encyclopedia of Dance Music	3/5 stars

System 7 is the first studio album by the dance/ambient band System 7.

A somewhat different version was released in the United States as 777 by 777. The running order is different, there are different mixes of two tracks (taken from the "Miracle" single), and it has two tracks from the "Freedom Fighters" single – "Depth Disco" and "Mia". Just to confuse matters, 777 was also the title of System 7's second UK album, with completely different music.

With several vocal tracks, this album has rather a different feel from later System 7 albums. Aniff Cousins appears on "Freedom Fighters" (with Zoë providing chorus vocals) and "Dog", and Olu Rowe on "Habibi", "Bon Humeur" and "Strange Quotations".

== Style ==
Candy Absorption of The Rough Guide to Rock wrote that the album was "accessible, if in retrospect untypical", adding that group leaders Steve Hillage and Miquette Giraudy "were yet to settle into their after-hours, dreamy, chill-out style, and the record features vocals by Olu Rowe reminiscent of Seal." John Bush of AllMusic writes that the album is a "potent crossover record" that explores "the polished end of ambient house". He wrote that Hillage's guitar solos and the structures of several tracks evoke Hillage's mid-1970s work, considering the album to be "space-rock explorations". Davydd Chong of Music Week describes it as an album of "atmospheric sound collages" which are laced with harder-edged material.

The single "Habibi" was described by Chong as "world music dragged through a sweaty sound system at three in the morning". Hillage explained: "'Habibi' means 'my love' in Arabic. I've had a long-term interest in Arabic music, right back to the mid-seventies. It's quite elevating." "Mia (The Fisherman Mix)", found on the American version of the album, is a washing ambient track which features on the 1993 Excursions in Ambience compilation.

== Track listing ==
=== System 7 ===
#	Track	Length	Written by	Produced by	Mixed by
1	"Sunburst"	07:25	Alex Paterson, Steve Hillage & Miquette Giraudy	Youth & Hillage	Youth and Thrash
2	"Freedom Fighters"	05:21	Hillage, Aniff Cousins & Zoë	Hillage	Hillage, Thrash and Greg Hunter
3	"Habibi"	06:09	Steve Waddington, Hillage, Olu Rowe & Giraudy	Hillage & Waddington	Thrash
4	"Altitude"	05:58	Derrick May & Hillage	May & Hillage	May
5	"Bon Humeur"	07:27	Hillage, Rowe & Giraudy	Hillage	Thrash
6	"Fractal Liaison"	02:09	May & Hillage	May & Hillage	mixed live to DAT
7	"Dog"	05:52	Paterson, Hillage, Cousins & Giraudy	Hillage	Thrash
8	"Thunderdog"	02:26	Paterson, Hillage & Giraudy	Hillage & Paterson	The Orb
9	"Listen"	06:23	May & Hillage	May & Hillage	Thrash
10	"Strange Quotations"	06:36	Hillage, Michael MacNeil & Rowe	Hillage	—
11	"Miracle"	07:08	Paterson, Paul Oakenfold, Hillage, Giraudy & Andy Falconer	Hillage	Thrash
12	"Over and Out"	03:27	Hillage & Giraudy	Hillage & Giraudy	—

=== 777 ===
777

Studio album by 777
- Released: July/August 1992
- Length: 78:33
- Labels: Caroline; CAROL 1727-2

Professional ratings
Review scores
Source	Rating
AllMusic	4/5 stars

#	Track	Length	Written by	Produced by	Mixed by
1	"Sunburst (Seahorse Mix)"	07:14	Paterson, Hillage & Giraudy	Youth & Hillage	Youth and Thrash
2	"Miracle (Orb Remix)"	06:31	Paterson, Oakenfold, Hillage, Giraudy & Falconer	Hillage	The Orb (Paterson and Thrash)
3	"Depth Disco"	07:35	Hillage, Giraudy & Lewis Keogh	Hillage	Hillage and Tyrell
4	"Altitude"	05:58	May & Hillage	May & Hillage	May
5	"Habibi"	06:19	Waddington, Hillage, Rowe & Giraudy	Hillage & Waddington	Thrash
6	"Strange Quotations"	06:16	Hillage, MacNeil & Rowe	Hillage	Hillage and Thrash
7	"Bon Humeur"	07:00	Hillage, Rowe & Giraudy	Hillage	Thrash
8	"Freedom Fighters"	05:18	Hillage, Cousins & Zoë	Hillage	Hillage, Thrash and Hunter
9	"Dog"	05:52	Paterson, Hillage, Cousins & Giraudy	Hillage	Thrash
10	"Thunderdog"	02:26	Paterson, Hillage & Giraudy	Hillage & Paterson	The Orb
11	"Listen"	06:25	May & Hillage	May & Hillage	Thrash
12	"Fractal Liaison"	02:10	May & Hillage	May & Hillage	mixed live to DAT
13	"Over and Out"	03:25	Hillage & Giraudy	Hillage & Giraudy	—
14	"Mia (The Fisherman Mix)"	06:09	Hillage, Nigel Butler & Giraudy	Hillage & Butler	mix consultant Paterson
