= Point 3 =

Album by System 7

Point 3 – Fire Album

Studio album by System 7
- Released: 1994; May 2003
- Recorded: 1994
- Genre: Dance; Electronica
- Length: 75:59
- Label: Butterfly Recordings BFLCA 11; A-Wave AAWCD002
- Producer: System 7

System 7 chronology
777 (1993)	Point 3 – Fire Album (1994)	Power of Seven (1996)

Professional ratings
Review scores
Source	Rating
Allmusic	4/5 stars

Point 3 – Water Album

Studio album by System 7
- Released: 1994; May 2003
- Genre: Ambient; Electronica
- Length: 73:49
- Label: Butterfly Recordings BFLCB 11; A-Wave AAWCD003

Professional ratings
Review scores
Source	Rating
Allmusic	4/5 stars

System 7.3: Fire + Water

Studio album by 777
- Released: 1995
- Genre: Ambient; Dance; Electronica
- Length: 75:59 + 73:49
- Label: Astralwerks/Caroline/Virgin/EMI Records ASW 66137

Point 3 is the collective title of the third and fourth studio albums by British ambient dance band System 7. The first of the two is Point 3 – Fire Album; the second, Point 3 – Water Album. The two offer different mixes of the same material, Fire using more drums and rhythms, while Water is more ambient. Three tracks are unique: "Radiate" and "Overview" appear only on Fire; "Liquid Sky", only on Water.

The albums were released in the United States as a 2-CD set as System 7.3: Fire + Water by 777 on Astralwerks Records.

== Track listing ==
=== Fire Album ===
#	Track	Length	Written by	Produced by	Mixed by
1	"Sirènes"	07:51	Laurent Garnier and Steve Hillage	Laurent Garnier and Steve Hillage	Laurent Garnier
2	"Alpha Wave (Gliss Mix)	08:04	Steve Hillage and Miquette Giraudy	Steve Hillage and Miquette Giraudy	Steve Hillage and Miquette Giraudy
3	"Mysterious Traveller"	06:31	Derrick May and Steve Hillage	Derrick May and Steve Hillage	Steve Hillage and Miquette Giraudy
4	"Coltrane (Fire Mix)"	08:54	Steve Hillage and Miquette Giraudy	Steve Hillage and Miquette Giraudy	Steve Hillage and Miquette Giraudy
5	"Radiate"	06:27	Lewis Keogh, Steve Hillage and Miquette Giraudy	Steve Hillage and Lewis Keogh	Steve Hillage, Mickey Mann and Lewis Keogh
6	"Overview"	06:09	Derrick May and Steve Hillage	Derrick May and Steve Hillage	Greg Hunter
7	"Gliding On Duo-Tone Curves"	07:39	Martin Glover (Youth), Steve Hillage and Greg Hunter	Youth	Youth and Greg Hunter
8	"Jupiter!"	06:45	Lol Hammond, Charlie Hall, Steve Hillage and Miquette Giraudy	Steve Hillage and The Drum Club	Charlie Hall
9	"Dr Livingstone I Presume"	08:55	Martin Glover and Steve Hillage	Youth and Steve Hillage	Youth and Greg Hunter
10	"Batukau"	07:42	Laurent Garnier and Steve Hillage	Laurent Garnier and Steve Hillage	Laurent Garnier and Mickey Mann

=== Water Album ===
#	Track	Length	Written by	Produced by	Mixed by
1	"Batukau (World Turtle Mix)"	04:50	Laurent Garnier and Steve Hillage	Laurent Garnier and Steve Hillage	Steve Hillage and Miquette Giraudy
2	"Sirènes (Tranquility Mix)"	05:02	Laurent Garnier and Steve Hillage	Laurent Garnier and Steve Hillage	Steve Hillage and Miquette Giraudy
3	"Coltrane (Firefly Mix)"	14:24	Steve Hillage and Miquette Giraudy	Steve Hillage and Miquette Giraudy	Steve Hillage and Miquette Giraudy
4	"Mysterious Traveller (Dust Devils Mix)"	06:54	Derrick May and Steve Hillage	Derrick May and Steve Hillage	Steve Hillage and Miquette Giraudy
5	"Dr Livingstone I Presume (Hotuatabotol Mix)"	05:34	Martin Glover and Steve Hillage	Youth and Steve Hillage	Youth and Greg Hunter
6	"Alpha Wave (Hemi-Sync Mix)"	13:27	Steve Hillage and Miquette Giraudy	Steve Hillage and Miquette Giraudy	Steve Hillage and Miquette Giraudy
7	"Liquid Sky"	07:54	Lol Hammond, Steve Hillage and Miquette Giraudy	Steve Hillage and Miquette Giraudy	Steve Hillage and Miquette Giraudy
8	"Gliding On Duo-Tone Curves (Cascade Mix)"	07:47	Martin Glover and Steve Hillage	Youth and Steve Hillage; additional production by Steve Hillage and Miquette Giraudy	Youth and Greg Hunter
9	"Jupiter! (Feed Your Head Mix)"	07:57	Lol Hammond, Charlie Hall, Steve Hillage and Miquette Giraudy	Steve Hillage and The Drum Club	Steve Hillage and Miquette Giraudy
