= Encantado (album) =

Studio album by System 7
- Released: October 2004
- Recorded: 2004
- Length: 1.1 hours
- Label: A-Wave AAWCD009
- Producer: Steve Hillage, Miquette Giraudy

System 7 chronology
Seventh Wave (2001)	Encantado (2004)

Encantado is the eighth studio album by British ambient dance band System 7.

"Encantado" is a Spanish word that means "enchanted" or "entranced". Hillage and Giraudy were inspired to use this title following a visit to Coba on the Yucatán Peninsula.

== Track listing ==
#	Track	Length	Written by	Produced by
1	"Planet 7"	08:26	Steve Hillage, Miquette Giraudy and Sander Kleinenberg	Steve; Hillage and Miquette; Giraudy
2	"Bewitched"	08:35	Steve Hillage and Miquette Giraudy	Steve; Hillage and Miquette; Giraudy
3	"Back to Reality"	07:56	Steve Hillage and Miquette Giraudy	Steve; Hillage and Miquette; Giraudy
4	"Octopussy"	07:18	Steve Hillage and Miquette Giraudy	Steve; Hillage and Miquette; Giraudy
5	"Bassrock"	07:54	Steve Hillage, Miquette Giraudy and Alex Paterson	Steve; Hillage and Miquette; Giraudy
6	"Kupuri"	08:47	Steve Hillage and Miquette Giraudy	Steve; Hillage and Miquette; Giraudy
7	"Gazed and Diffused"	06:45	Steve Hillage and Miquette Giraudy	Steve; Hillage and Miquette; Giraudy
8	"Dance of the Deer"	07:53	Steve Hillage and Miquette Giraudy	Steve; Hillage and Miquette; Giraudy
9	"Europa (Blue)"	07:34	Steve Hillage and Miquette Giraudy	Steve; Hillage and Miquette; Giraudy
