= Naked (Blue Pearl album) =

1990 studio album by Blue Pearl

Studio album by Blue Pearl
- Released: 1990
- Label: Big Life
- Producer: Youth; Howard Gray

Professional ratings
Review scores
Source	Rating
AllMusic	2/5 stars
NME	3/10

Naked is the only studio album by English electronic music group Blue Pearl, released in 1990 on the Big Life record label. The album includes Blue Pearl's biggest hit single "Naked in the Rain" (UK No. 4) and the follow-up single "Little Brother" (UK No. 31). It also includes a cover of "Running Up That Hill" by Kate Bush.

== Track listing ==
All tracks written by Durga McBroom, except where noted.

No.	Title	Writer(s)	Length
1.	"Naked in the Rain"	McBroom; Youth	4:11
2.	"Down to You"	McBroom; Youth	4:13
3.	"Chemical Thing"		5:12
4.	"I Never Knew"		4:35
5.	"Running Up That Hill"	Kate Bush	4:53
6.	"Little Brother"	McBroom; Guy Pratt; Youth	5:21
7.	"Alive"	McBroom; Pratt; Youth	6:27
8.	"Rollover"		5:16
9.	"Without Love"		4:51
10.	"Over You"		4:01
11.	"Chemical Thing" (Ambient Mix)		5:10
12.	"Rollover" (Acapella)		4:30

== Personnel ==
Blue Pearl

- Durga McBroom – keyboards, vocals
- Youth – drum programming, guitar, bass guitar, keyboards, producer

with:

- Gary Barnacle – saxophone
- Michael Bigwood – mixing
- Stephen Chase – mixing
- Marius de Vries – mixing
- Fred Defaye – mixing
- Andy Falconer – engineer
- Adam Fuest – engineer, mixing
- David Gilmour – guitar
- Howard Gray – mixing, producer
- Trevor Gray – keyboards, producer, programming
- Sarah Gregory – artwork, illustrations
- Mike Jarratt – engineer
- Simon "The Funky Ginger" Law – piano
- Pete Lorimer – engineer
- Ian McKell – photography
- Mark O'Donoughue – engineer
- Tim Parry – executive producer
- Guy Pratt – bass guitar
- Tim Renwick – guitar
- Steve Sidelnyk – mixing
- Jazz Summers – executive producer
- Thrash – engineer
- Mark "Tufty" Evans – engineer
- Joel "Tyrrell" LeBlanc – engineer
- Gary Wallis – percussion
- Dave Williams – guitar
- Gavyn Wright – string arrangements
- Richard Wright – keyboards

== Charts ==
Chart (1990)	Peak position
UK Albums (OCC)	58
