= Transmission (band) =

Experimental/post-rock band based in the United Kingdom

Transmission is an English experimental/post-rock band based in the United Kingdom. The band includes former members of Killing Joke, Murder, Inc., The Verve, and Dreadzone.

== Band members ==
- Tim Bran - vocals, keyboards
- Paul Ferguson - drums
- Simon Tong - guitar
- Youth - bass, guitar

== Discography ==
- Noctolucent EP (2006)
- Beyond Light (2006)
- Sublimity (2008)
