= Blue Pearl =

English electronic music duo

- Origin: London, England
- Genres: House, alternative dance
- Years active: 1990–1993, 1998
- Label: Big Life
- Past members: Durga McBroom; Youth

Blue Pearl were an electronic music duo consisting of American female singer Durga McBroom and British musician Youth (Martin Glover). They charted six times on the UK singles chart and had two songs reach the US Billboard Hot Dance Club Play chart.

"Naked in the Rain" was a No. 4 hit in the UK Singles Chart and a No. 5 dance hit in the US in 1990, which was originally issued on blue vinyl. It was followed by "(Can You) Feel the Passion" (whose melody samples Bizarre Inc's "Playing with Knives"), which hit No. 1 on both Billboard's Dance Club Play and the UK Dance Chart in 1992, reaching No. 14 on the UK Singles Chart. They also had a Top 40 hit in the UK Singles Chart in November 1990 with the No. 31 hit, "Little Brother".

As McBroom is a backing vocalist for Pink Floyd, their records feature guest appearances from David Gilmour and Richard Wright. A couple of decades later, both Youth and McBroom went on to be involved in the completion of Pink Floyd's 2014 album The Endless River, which charted at No. 1 in the UK Albums Chart.

== Discography ==
=== Albums ===
- Naked (1990) UK No. 58

=== Singles ===
Year	Single	Peak positions									Album
Year	Single	UK	IRE	NED	BEL (FLA)	GER	AUT	SWI	SWE	US Dance	Album
1990	"Naked in the Rain"	4	14	—	9	21	2	15	6	5	Naked
1990	"Little Brother"	31	30	—	—	75	—	—	—	—	Naked
1991	"Alive"	—	—	—	—	—	—	—	—	—	Naked
1991	"(Can You) Feel the Passion"	14	24	49	34	—	—	—	32	1	singles only
1992	"Mother Dawn"	50	—	—	—	—	—	—	—	—	singles only
1993	"Fire of Love" (with Jungle High)	71	—	—	—	—	—	—	—	—	singles only
1998	"Naked in the Rain '98"	22	—	—	—	—	—	—	—	—	singles only
"—" denotes releases that did not chart or were not released.											singles only

== See also ==
- List of Billboard number-one dance club songs
- List of artists who reached number one on the US Dance chart
