= Naked in the Rain =

1990 single by Blue Pearl

Single by Blue Pearl

from the album Naked
- Released: 1990
- Length: 6:07 (12-inch mix); 3:50 (7-inch mix)
- Label: Big Life
- Songwriters: Durga McBroom; Youth
- Producer: Youth

Blue Pearl singles chronology
"Naked in the Rain" (1990)	"Little Brother" (1990)

"Naked in the Rain" is a song performed by English dance music group Blue Pearl and released as their debut single in 1990 by label Big Life. The song was co-written by Blue Pearl's singer Durga McBroom and producer Youth (also known as Martin Glover). It is featured on their album Naked. Graham Massey from English electronic music group 808 State was the track's remixer.

The song was a hit in the United Kingdom, reaching number four on the UK Singles Chart in July 1990, and later became a dance hit in the United States, reaching the top five on the Billboard Dance Club Play chart. A music video, directed by Richard Stanley, accompanied the song on its release, featuring McBroom performing in a tropical jungle-like scene mixed with scenes in an almost Third World setting, and visualizes the overall atmosphere of the song.

In 1998 the song was remixed and released as a single. Entitled "Naked in the Rain '98", the remixed version reached number 22 on the UK Singles Chart.

== Charts ==
=== Weekly charts ===
"Naked in the Rain"

Chart (1990)	Peak position
Austria (Ö3 Austria Top 40)	2
Belgium (Ultratop 50 Flanders)	9
Europe (Eurochart Hot 100)	11
Ireland (IRMA)	14
Israel (Israeli Singles Chart)	6
Luxembourg (Radio Luxembourg)	3
Sweden (Sverigetopplistan)	6
Switzerland (Schweizer Hitparade)	15
UK Singles (Official Charts)	4
UK Indie (Music Week)	1
US Dance Club Play (Billboard)	5
West Germany (GfK)	21

"Naked in the Rain '98"

Chart (1990)	Peak position
Scottish Singles Sales (Official Charts)	19
UK Singles (Official Charts)	22
UK Dance (Official Charts)	3

=== Year-end charts ===
"Naked in the Rain"

Chart (1990)	Position
Austria (Ö3 Austria Top 40)	19
Belgium (Ultratop)	76
Europe (Eurochart Hot 100)	53
Sweden (Topplistan)	36
UK Singles (OCC)	31

== Other versions ==
- The Naturists, a techno band led by Sid Raven and Wilmott Doonican, issued a version called "Naked" on Interactive records in 1994
- Caz Heyes, a Hi-NRG singer from Blackpool issued a version that was mixed by Matt Pop and DJ Toy Armada in 2026 on the label Pumpin'UK, gaining success on the Club Charts.
