= Nick Holywell-Walker =

British musician (born 13th August 1971)

- Born: 1971 (age 54–55); London, England
- Genres: Industrial rock, electronica
- Instruments: Keyboards, programming

Nick Holywell-Walker is a British musician best known as the touring keyboard player for English post-punk band Killing Joke, beginning in 1994. He left in 2004 to concentrate on his own projects. A singer, songwriter, producer and composer, he resided in North London, for many years until returning to his hometown in Norfolk, England. He is founding member of UK band Wandering Crow and a father of three.

Since 1998 he has also composed, produced and mixed soundtracks for film + TV extensively. Some notable projects include BBC's Wolfblood, and Silent Witness.

== Bibliography ==
Further reading:

- Hämäläinen, Jyrki "Spider" (2020). Killing Joke: Are You Receiving?. Milton Keynes: New Haven Publishing Ltd. ISBN 978-1912587407.
