= Seventh Wave (System 7 album) =

Studio album by System 7
- Released: September 2001
- Recorded: 2001
- Length: 71:04
- Label: A-Wave AAWCD007
- Producer: System 7

System 7 chronology
| Golden Section (1997) | Seventh Wave (2001) | Encantado (2004) |

Seventh Wave is the seventh studio album by the electronic band System 7. It was released in 2001 through the A-Wave company.

== Track listing ==
All tracks are written by System 7

| No. | Title | Length |
|---|---|---|
| 1. | "Manik Shamanik" | 9:46 |
| 2. | "High Plains Drifter" | 8:50 |
| 3. | "7 O'Clock" | 10:25 |
| 4. | "Soft Rain" | 8:53 |
| 5. | "Sal del Mar" | 9:00 |
| 6. | "Varkala" | 8:11 |
| 7. | "The Abyss" | 7:39 |
| 8. | "Chiringuito" | 8:19 |
| Total length: | | 71:04 |
