= Money Is Not Our God =

Song by Killing Joke

Single by Killing Joke

from the album Extremities, Dirt & Various Repressed Emotions
- A-side: "Money Is Not Our God"
- B-side: "North of the Border"
- Released: 3 January 1991
- Genre: Post-punk, industrial rock
- Length: 11:02
- Label: Aggressive Rockproduktionen
- Songwriters: Jaz Coleman; Kevin "Geordie" Walker; Martin Atkins
- Producers: Killing Joke, Martin Rex (credited "A. Rex")

Killing Joke singles chronology
| "The Beautiful Dead" (1990) | "Money Is Not Our God" (1991) | "Change: The Spiral Tribe Mix/The Youth Mixes" (1992) |

Killing Joke CD singles chronology
| "America" (1988) | "Money Is Not Our God" (1991) | "Change: The Spiral Tribe Mix/The Youth Mixes" (1992) |

CD Mini Single release
- Money Is Not Our God CD Mini Single Frontcover

"Money Is Not Our God" is Killing Joke's second and only official single from their eighth studio album, Extremities, Dirt & Various Repressed Emotions. It was released only in Germany on 3 January 1991 by the Aggressive Rockproduktionen label on 12" vinyl and as a CD mini single, both backed by B-side "North of the Border".

"Money Is Not Our God" failed to chart on the UK Singles Chart.

== Reception ==
Reception for "Money Is Not Our God" was generally positive. Ned Raggett of Allmusic praised Geordie Walker's guitar performance as "better than ever" and the song itself "rips along with the sheer fire of 1980 intact." He credited Coleman's vocals as an "opening rampage" and that the group "collectively allows for the later abilities of the members and incorporates that into the performances."

== Track listings ==
=== 12" single ===
Side A

1. "Money Is Not Our God" – 05:12

Side B

1. "North of the Border" – 05:50

=== CD mini single ===
Side A

1. "Money Is Not Our God" – 05:12
2. "North of the Border" – 05:50
