= System 7 (band) =

British electronic music project

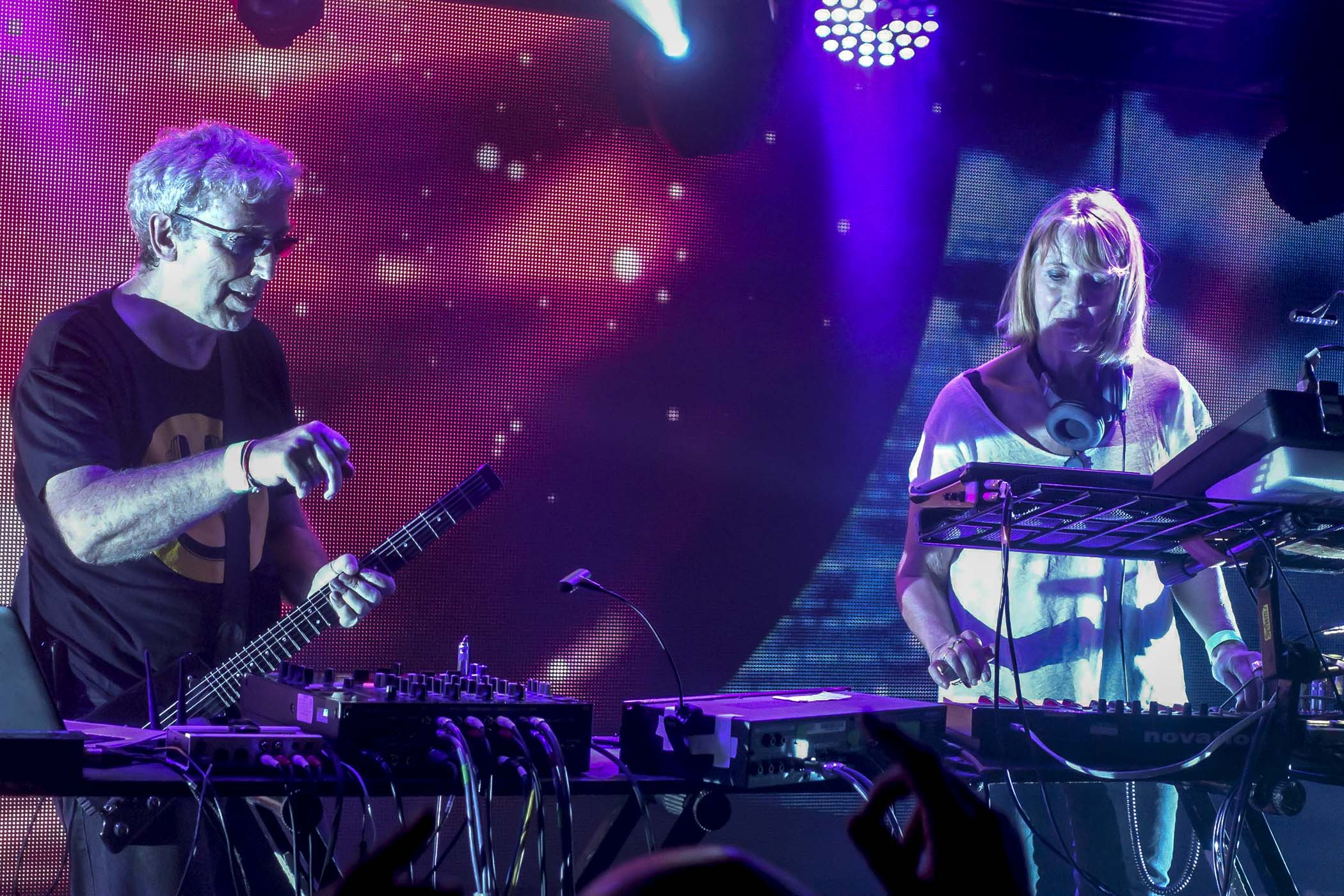
- System 7 performing in London, September 2018

Background information
- Origin: Chingford, England
- Genres: Techno, ambient, tech house, progressive trance, psychedelic trance
- Years active: 1989–present
- Labels: A-Wave, Big Life Records, Virgin/EMI Records, Caroline Records
- Spinoff of: Gong
- Members: Steve Hillage; Miquette Giraudy
- Website: a-wave.com/system7

System 7 are a UK-based electronic dance music band. Due to the existence of another band called System Seven they were initially billed as 777 in North America.

Steve Hillage and Miquette Giraudy, both formerly of Gong, formed System 7 in 1989, after a period of several years becoming gradually immersed in the developments of electronic and dance music in the UK while Steve was working mainly as a record producer for other artists. A key early collaborator was DJ Alex Paterson (of the Orb), whom Steve and Miquette heard playing Hillage's 1979 ambient record Rainbow Dome Musick in an ambient DJ set at the London club Heaven. They soon became part of the underground dance scene in London. While Hillage and Giraudy form the core of System 7, it is an extended collaborative project with artists such as A Guy Called Gerald, Paul Oakenfold, Carl Craig, Laurent Garnier, Derrick May, Alex Paterson, and Youth. System 7 makes extensive use of Hillage's electric guitars.

Hillage and Giraudy later launched a chill-out and downtempo sister project called Mirror System, and have also worked under the name Groovy Intent.

The first System 7 album was released on Virgin's 10 Records dance music label, followed by the vinyl-only Derrick May collaboration Altitude (featuring Ultra Naté). In 1992, System 7 moved to Youth's Butterfly label, releasing four albums, until 1999 when they founded their own label A-Wave for all future releases, also re-releasing their Butterfly catalogue.

In addition to the albums, System 7 have released a number of club singles with notable remixes from, among others, Richie Hawtin (aka Plastikman), Dubfire, James Holden, Liquid Soul, and Son Kite.

== System 7 Live ==
=== Early 1990s ===
System 7 were one of the first techno groups to play live, and have developed a live performance approach that is a bit more extreme than their records, with tougher beats and hypnotic live echo loops. The first System 7 live show was in December 1990 at Linford Studios in Battersea, London, consisting of Steve playing guitar and Alex Paterson playing samples and DJing pre-release versions of the upcoming first System 7 and Orb albums. In 1991 there were some more shows and a tour to support the System 7 album release, with Miquette's synthesisers incorporated into the live sound. In 1993 System 7, now playing as a duo, developed a new live technical format and joined Orbital, The Drum Club, and Aphex Twin on the Midi Circus tour of the UK with Megadog party crew.

=== Festivals ===
Partly through their extended involvement with Megadog, by 1994 System 7 had become an established live act, in particular playing at many music festivals. In 1995, through his previous association with Michael Eavis, Steve Hillage was asked to oversee the putting together of the first official dance music stage at Glastonbury Festival. In subsequent years System 7 played at Glastonbury a further 15 times, often at the open-air Glade stage, a further dance music development at the festival that started in 2000. The crew from the Glastonbury Glade stage created their own spin-off festival, the Glade Festival, starting in 2004, with System 7 playing there 5 times.

Other major festivals where they have played include Phoenix Festival, Beach Festival, Wickerman, Willowman, Womad, Sunrise Celebration, Waveform, Whirl-Y-Gig, Guilfest, and Eden Festival (UK); Printemps de Bourges, Borealis and Francofolies (France); Lovefield and Burg Herzberg (Germany); Pink Pop and Lowlands (Netherlands); Dour Festival and I Love Techno (Belgium); Sonica (Italy); Open Air Field (Czech Republic); Odinstown and Roskilde (Denmark); Hultsfred and Arvika (Sweden); Konemetsä (Finland); Indigo Festival (Israel); Ozora (Hungary); Reverence Valada and Boom Festival (Portugal).

Outside of Europe they have played at Juggernaut Festival and the Big Top tour (USA); Fuji Rock, Summersonic, Star Festival, Amami Eclipse 2009, Hotaka, Asagiri Jam, Nagisa Festival, Solstice Music Festival and the World Festival of Sacred Music (Japan); Earthcore (Australia); Universo Paralello (Brazil); Tribal Gathering (Panama).

=== Recent shows ===
System 7 co-headlined at Matsuri Digital's Timeless event at AgeHa, Tokyo on 14 March 2015, and at the Megadog 30th anniversary event at Manchester Academy on 21 November 2015. They continue to play their own club shows and at parties and festivals, including Glastonbury, Ozora and Boom. They have also been involved in some notable live collaborations with The Orb, Japanese progressive space rock jam band Rovo (Phoenix Rising), Japanese rock guitarist and Juno Reactor collaborator Sugizo, leading psy-trance artist Ajja (Novelty Engine), and Merv Pepler of Eat Static (System Static).

=== Mirror System Live ===
System 7's chill-out and downtempo sister project Mirror System made its live debut on the ID Spiral chill-out stage at the UK Sunrise Celebration festival in 2006, followed closely by a set also with ID Spiral at the Glade Festival of that year. In 2007, ID Spiral opened the InSpiral Lounge in Camden. London, and Mirror System played at the opening party on 16 December 2007. They became one of the resident artists at the InSpiral Lounge playing there two or three times a year, including most of the inSpiral New Year's Eve parties. Mirror System live also became popular in Japan, and at European trance festivals where they have been booked as the chill-out stage closing act at Sonica (twice), Ozora (three times) and Boom Festival, where in 2016 they followed their closing set with a full-length live rendition of Rainbow Dome Musick. With the Reflector DJ mix album (release in 2009) the Mirror System sound expanded to incorporate a soft techno dance groove element, and this element has been further developed in their most recent album, N-Port. This ability to seamlessly move from deep chill to danceable grooves that still retain the chill element, has been an important factor in the Mirror System live approach.

== System 7 in Japan ==
Since their first show, at the closing party for Tokyo's On Air club on 4 May 1994 with Orbital and Alex Paterson, System 7 have toured in Japan on twenty-eight further occasions. In addition Steve Hillage went to Japan to play with Manuel Göttsching at Metamorphose Festival (2010) and to play with Tomita at Free Dommune Festival in 2013, plus an additional visit to mix the Phoenix Rising album in February 2013. System 7 have a special relationship with Japan, and have been closely associated with the development of live dance music there. As an extension to this special spiritual connection, System 7 played as the only electronic dance music act at the World Festival of Sacred Music at Itsukujima shrine on Miyajima in 2001, and also offered a hōnō (dedicatory) performance at Tenkawa-Daibenzaiten-sha (Tenkawa shrine) in Nara in 2013. In 2006 they were approached by Rumiko Tezuka, the daughter of famed manga pioneer Osamu Tezuka, to see if they were interested in making musical interpretations of her father's Phoenix manga graphic novels. Rumiko had first become interested in System 7 after seeing them perform at the Miyajima festival. This project excited System 7 and it led directly to their album Phoenix (released in Japan in 2007), which became their biggest selling album in Japan and also produced their successful Japanese single Hinotori (which means bird of fire). The phoenix theme, with Rumiko Tezuka's endorsement, continued with System 7's album and tour collaboration with Japanese band Rovo, which was titled Phoenix Rising, and also featured Rovo's live rock re-interpretation of the track Hinotori. Other System 7 recording and remixing collaborations in Japan have been with Mito (of the group Clammbon), Sugizo, and Joujouka, the group founded by noted Japanese psychedelic trance DJ Tsuyoshi Suzuki.

== Discography ==
=== Studio albums ===
- System 7 (1991)
- 777 (1993) - No. 30 on the UK Albums Chart; March 1993
- Point 3 - Fire Album (1994)
- Point 3 - Water Album (1994)
- Power of Seven (1996)
- Golden Section (1997)
- Seventh Wave (2001)
- Encantado (2004)
- Phoenix (2008)
- Up (2011)
- Phoenix Rising (2013) with Rovo
- X-Port (2015)
- Cafe Seven (2018)
- Field of Dreams (2020)
- Flower of Life (2026)

As Mirror System

- Mirror System (2006)
- Reflector - DJ Mix (2010)
- N-Port (2015)

=== U.S. albums ===
As 777

- 777 (1992) U.S. version of the System 7 album
- System 7.3: Fire + Water (1995) U.S. release of the two Point 3 albums

=== Compilations ===
- Excursions in Ambience (A Collection of Ambient-House Music) (1994)
- Excursions in Ambience (The Fourth Frontier) (1995)
- System Express (1996)
- Mysterious Traveller with Derrick May (2002)
- Planet 7 (2006) iTunes-only album
- System 7 - Classics (2010) iTunes-only album
- Out (2014)

=== Live albums ===
- Live Transmissions (2006)
- Live Transmissions 02 (2025)

=== Singles and EPs ===
- "Sunburst" (1990)
- "Habibi" (1991)
- "Freedom Fighters" (1991)
- "Miracle" (1991)
- "7:7 Expansion" (1992) - No. 39 on the UK Singles Chart; February 1993
- Altitude (featuring Ultra Naté) (1992) - No. 75 on the UK Albums Chart; June 1992
- "Sinbad" / "Quest" (1993) - No. 74 on the UK Singles Chart; July 1993
- "Alpha Wave" (1995) - No. 92 on the UK Singles Chart; April 1995
- "Hangar 84" (1996)
- "Interstate" (1996) - No. 85 on the UK Singles Chart; February 1996
- "Rite of Spring" (1997) - No. 99 on the UK Singles Chart; July 1997
- "Ring of Fire" (1998)
- "High Planes Drifter" (2001)
- "Planet 7" (2004)
- "Love Mission - Mission Love" • "I Move" • "Teotihuacan" • "Om Rock" (by Groovy Intent) (download-only EP) (2004)
- "Space Bird" (2008)
- "AlphaWave" / "HPD" (2010)
- "Passion" (2012)
- "Hinotori" (with Rovo) (2013)

== See also ==
- List of ambient music artists
