= Butterfly Recordings =

Record labels

- Genre: Dance, electronic, folk
- Country of origin: United States

Butterfly Recordings is the name used by three record labels.

== 1970s ==
Butterfly Records, a disco record label created in 1977 by A.J. Cervantes in Los Angeles, California. Throughout the 1980s, the company licensed its music for movies, television and aerobics studios. The catalog was sold to Warner Music in 1988. Per A.J. Cervantes.

== 1990s ==
Butterfly Recordings, formed by the artist and electronic dance music producer Martin Glover (commonly known as Youth). Youth set up the second incarnation in the 1990s before setting up Dragonfly Records. It released many electronic dance albums by such bands as System 7, often in conjunction with Big Life. It is sometimes cited as Butterfly Records.

== 2007 ==
Youth and Simon Tong formed the third incarnation to focus on folk and acoustic music. The label's first release is What the Folk (12 February 2007).

== See also ==
- Lists of record labels
- List of electronic music record labels
- List of independent UK record labels
