= Youth (musician) =

British musician and producer (born 1960)

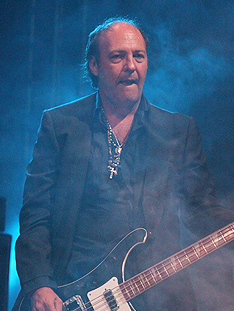
- Youth performing with Killing Joke in 2011

Background information
- Also known as: Youth, Orion
- Born: Martin Glover; 27 December 1960 (age 65); Slough, Buckinghamshire, England
- Genres: Rock; post-punk; experimental rock; electronic; ambient; dub
- Occupations: Musician, record producer
- Instruments: Bass; keyboards; vocals
- Member of: Killing Joke, the Fireman
- Formerly of: Brilliant, Blue Pearl, Pigface

Martin Glover (born 27 December 1960), better known by his stage name Youth, is a British musician and record producer. He is a founding member and bassist of the rock band Killing Joke, and a member of the Fireman, along with Paul McCartney.

== Early career ==
Martin Glover was born on 27 December 1960 in Slough, at that point part of Buckinghamshire, England. He attended private boarding school Kingham Hill School near Chipping Norton, Oxfordshire, where he met Alex Paterson, who would become a roadie for Glover's band Killing Joke, and later founder of the Orb. Naming himself Youth after the roots reggae chanter Big Youth, in 1977 he joined punk rock band the Rage, who toured with the Adverts. Later he joined "4 Be 2", a band formed by John Lydon's brother Jimmy Lydon, and recorded the "One of the Lads" single with them.

Youth was the original bass player in Killing Joke but left the band in 1982 and soon after founded his own band Brilliant with future the KLF member Jimmy Cauty. The act recorded one album with producers Stock Aitken Waterman (SAW) in 1985 before disbanding.

Youth also played bass on the Bollock Brothers' disco-mix 12-inch, "The Slow Removal of Vincent van Gogh's Left Ear" (1982).

In 1989, Youth and Alex Paterson started the WAU! Mr. Modo label.

Youth was asked by Adrian Sherwood to remix some of Bim Sherman's tracks for a reworking of the Miracle album. He also appeared on a Ted Parsons/NIC dub album, contributing a remix which opens with a sample from Glen Brown's "Version '78", a track originally released on the South East label.

In the early 1990s, Youth formed techno and house music duo Blue Pearl together with American singer Durga McBroom. They scored a handful of hit singles including their blue vinyl debut "Naked in the Rain", which reached No. 4 in the UK singles chart and was also a No. 5 dance hit in the U.S. in 1990. It was followed by "Little Brother" and "(Can You) Feel the Passion". An album, Naked, was also released.

In 1994, Youth rejoined Killing Joke and their album Pandemonium was released on his Butterfly Recordings label, as was the 1996 follow-up, Democracy.

He is credited with founding the first psychedelic trance record label, Dragonfly Records, as well as the Liquid Sound Design and Kamaflage Records labels. He is well known in the psychedelic trance scene, collaborating with Simon Posford and Saul Davies as Celtic Cross, with Greg Hunter and Simon Posford as Dub Trees, and on the project Zodiac Youth. He has performed both full-on trance as well as chill-out DJ sets at several Return to the Source parties, and released the Ambient Meditations 3 mix album on their label in 2000. His Butterfly Studios were also home of the Return to the Source offices circa 1999–2002.

== Later career ==
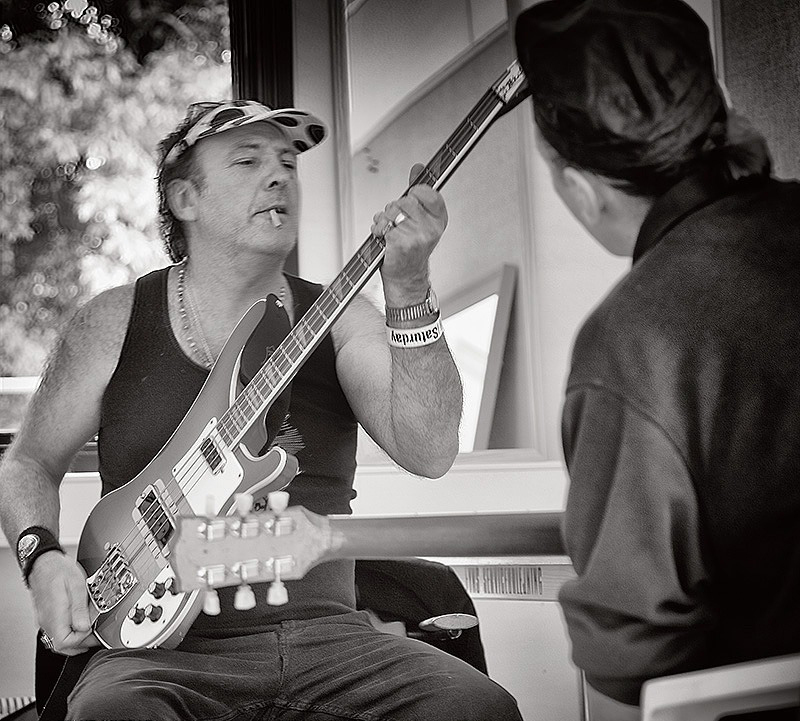
Youth (left) with Geordie Walker

Youth's Butterfly Records label has produced artists such as Take That, Wet Wet Wet, Tom Jones, the Orb, System 7, Maria McKee and Heather Nova. Youth was the co-producer of the Verve's Urban Hymns and Dolores O'Riordan's Are You Listening?. He has also worked, produced and remixed for artists including Kate Bush, Guns N' Roses, Primal Scream, Embrace, Lee Scratch Perry, Siouxsie and the Banshees, Gaudi, Art of Noise, Crowded House, Zoe, P.M. Dawn, Pop Will Eat Itself, Yazoo, Erasure, U2, Bananarama, INXS, James and Suns of Arqa.

Youth had also made plans to work with Duran Duran in the later stages of their lost album Reportage, before it was shelved later in 2006.

In 2008, Youth produced the Delays album Everything's the Rush, the Futureheads' This Is Not The World and worked on the debut album of American band The Daylights. In 2013, Glover produced the debut album Collective by the DIY indie rock band Echotape, followed by Meteorites by Echo and the Bunnymen and Lion by Peter Murphy. The following year, Glover produced Culture Club's Tribes album.

Youth is a member of the band Transmission, together with Simon Tong of the Verve, Paul Ferguson of Killing Joke and Tim Bran of Dreadzone. He also played guitar on several tracks on the 2007 Client album Heartland.

In mid-2010, he teamed up with Alex Paterson (of the Orb) to compile a retrospective compilation album of tracks from the WAU! Mr Modo label. The album titled Impossible Oddities was released on CD and double vinyl on 25 October 2010 via Year Zero Records.

In 2011, he recorded Generation Indigo, a fusion of punk, dub, ambient and techno with Poly Styrene of early punk rock band X-Ray Spex.

On 27 October 2012, during the International Festival of Music Producers and Sound Designers SOUNDEDIT, Youth was awarded The Man with the Golden Ear Award.

In 2016, he received the PPL Music Producers Guild Lifetime Achievement award and released the album Create Christ, Sailor Boy with David Tibet as Hypnopazūzu.

In 2017, he teamed with Gaudi for two collaborative releases as 'YOUTH & GAUDI': the vinyl 10in '2063: A Dub Odyssey' (printed on a limited edition green vinyl) and their debut album 'Astronaut Alchemists', both on Liquid Sound Design. Subsequently, the duo released the double album 'Astronaut Alchemists – Remixes' featuring Banco de Gaia, The Orb, Kaya Project, Bombay Dub Orchestra, Kuba, Gabriel Le Mar, Pitch Black, BUS/Gus Till, Vlastur, Deep Fried Dub, The Egg, Jef Stott/Aslan Dub, Onium, Living Light, Sadhu Sensi, DM-Theory and Uncle Fester On Acid.

In 2018, he recorded a collaborative album with Nik Turner. Pharaohs from Outer Space was released by Painted Word on 17 August 2018.

In 2019 he teamed with Italian musician Emilio Sorridente and created The Dream Symposium. They recorded the space rock album Green Electric Muse, produced by Youth and released in 2020 by Youthsounds Records. In the same year, he worked with Public Image Ltd's Keith Levene and Richard Dudanski on a single about the Brexit revolt with Mark Stewart of the Pop Group on vocals.

In 2021, he received the Grammy Award in the category Best Reggae Album as a producer of Got to Be Tough by Toots and the Maytals.

== Production discography ==
Taken from Martin Glover's Youth site.

Artist	Title	Record company	Credit	Year
Alien Sex Fiend	Who's Been Sleeping in My Brain	Anagram Records	Production	1983
Art of Noise	"The Ambient Collection"	China/Polydor	Additional Production/Remix	1990
Art of Noise	Art of Love	China	Production/Remix	
Bananarama	Pop Life	London	Production	1991
Blue Pearl	Naked	Big Life	Production	
Blue Pearl	Naked in the Rain	Big Life	Production	
The Charlatans	Who We Touch	Frinck Recordings	Production	2010
Edwyn Collins	A Girl Like You		Remix	
Crowded House	Together Alone	EMI	Production	
The Cult	She Sells Sanctuary	Beggars Banquet Records	Additional production/mix	
Howie Day	Stop All the World Now	Sony (US)	Production	
Dido	Don't Think of Me	BMG	Production	
Drum Club	Drums are Dangerous	Instinct	Production	
Dubstar	One	Northern Writes	Production	
Embrace	All You Good Good People		Production	
Embrace	Come Back to What You Know	Hut Records	Production	
Embrace	The Good Will Out	Independiente	Production/Mixed	
Embrace	Higher Sights	Hut	Production	
Erasure	"Chorus" (single)	Mute Records	Production/Mixed	
Faith No More	A Small Victory	Slash Records	12" remix	
FAKE?	Switching on X	MusicTaste	Production	
The Fireman	Strawberries Oceans Ships Forest	Parlophone	Writer/Co-producer	1993
The Fireman	Rushes	Hydra	Writer/Co-producer	1998
The Fireman	Electric Arguments	One Little Indian	Writer/Co-producer	2008
The Futureheads	This Is Not the World	Nul Records	Production	
Guns N' Roses	Chinese Democracy	Geffen	initial arrangement suggestions, Additional Demo Pre-production on "Madagascar"	2008
James	Seven	Mercury Records	Production	
Vanessa-Mae	Art of War	EMI	Production/Mix	2002
Marilyn Manson	Mobscene	Interscope Records	Additional production/remix	
The Music	Come What May	Virgin	Production	
Heather Nova	Oyster	Big Life	Production	
Heather Nova	Siren	Sony	Production	
Heather Nova	Pearl	Saltwater	Production	
The Orb	The Orb's Adventures Beyond the Ultraworld	Island Records	Co-producer/Co-writer	
Beth Orton	Best Bit	Heavenly Recordings	Production	
P.M. Dawn	Set Adrift on Memory Bliss	Island	Additional production/mix	1991
The Prostitutes	Deaf to the Call	X Production	Production	
Sam Roberts Band	Lo-Fantasy	Secret Brain	Production	2014
Shack	H.M.S. Fable	London	Production	
Shed Seven	Instant Pleasures	BMG	Production	2017
Siouxsie and the Banshees	"Kiss Them for Me"	Wonderland	12" remix	1991
Sonido Vegetal	Las Bases del Razonamiento	Maldito Digital	Production	
Sonido Vegetal	Verbena Calavera	Octubre (Sony Music)	Production	
The Sugarcubes	Vitamin	One Little Indian Records	12" remix	
Symposium	Bury You	Infectious Records	Production	
Symposium	Paint The Stars	Infectious Records	Production	
Tribazik	Data Warfare	Skyride	Mixing and additional production	
U2	Night and Day	Island	12" remix	1998
Vega 4	Love Is The Music	Taste Media	Production	
The Verve	Bitter Sweet Symphony	Hut Records	Production	
The Verve	Lucky Man	Hut Records	Production	
The Verve	Sonnet	Hut Records	Production	
The Verve	Urban Hymns	Hut Records	Co-producer	1997
Naturists	Naked In the Rain	Interactive Records	Co-producer	
Naturists	Naturist composition inst	Interactive Records	Co-producer	
Naturists	Naked	Interactive Records	Co-producer	
Nik Tuner (Hawkwind)	Interstellar Energy	Cadiz Music	Producer	2020
Youth Meets Jah Wobble	Acid Punk Dub Apocalypse	Cadiz Music	Artist/Producer	2020
Youth	Spinning Wheel	Cadiz Music	Artist/Producer	2022
Radical Dance Faction	Welcome To The Edge	Cadiz Music	Producer	2023
Lee Scratch Perry	Spaceship To Mars	Creation Youth	Artist/Producer	2024
3HEAD	You Are Beautiful	Creation Youth	Producer	2025
Bad Fractals	The Sea Sang Screaming	Creation Youth	Producer	2026
Zodiac Youth	Carnival Of Souls	Creation Youth	Artist/Producer	2026
Chant Artist Collective	Relics Of Tree Worship (In Dub)	Cadiz Music/Balance Recordings	Producer	2026
