= Dead by April discography =

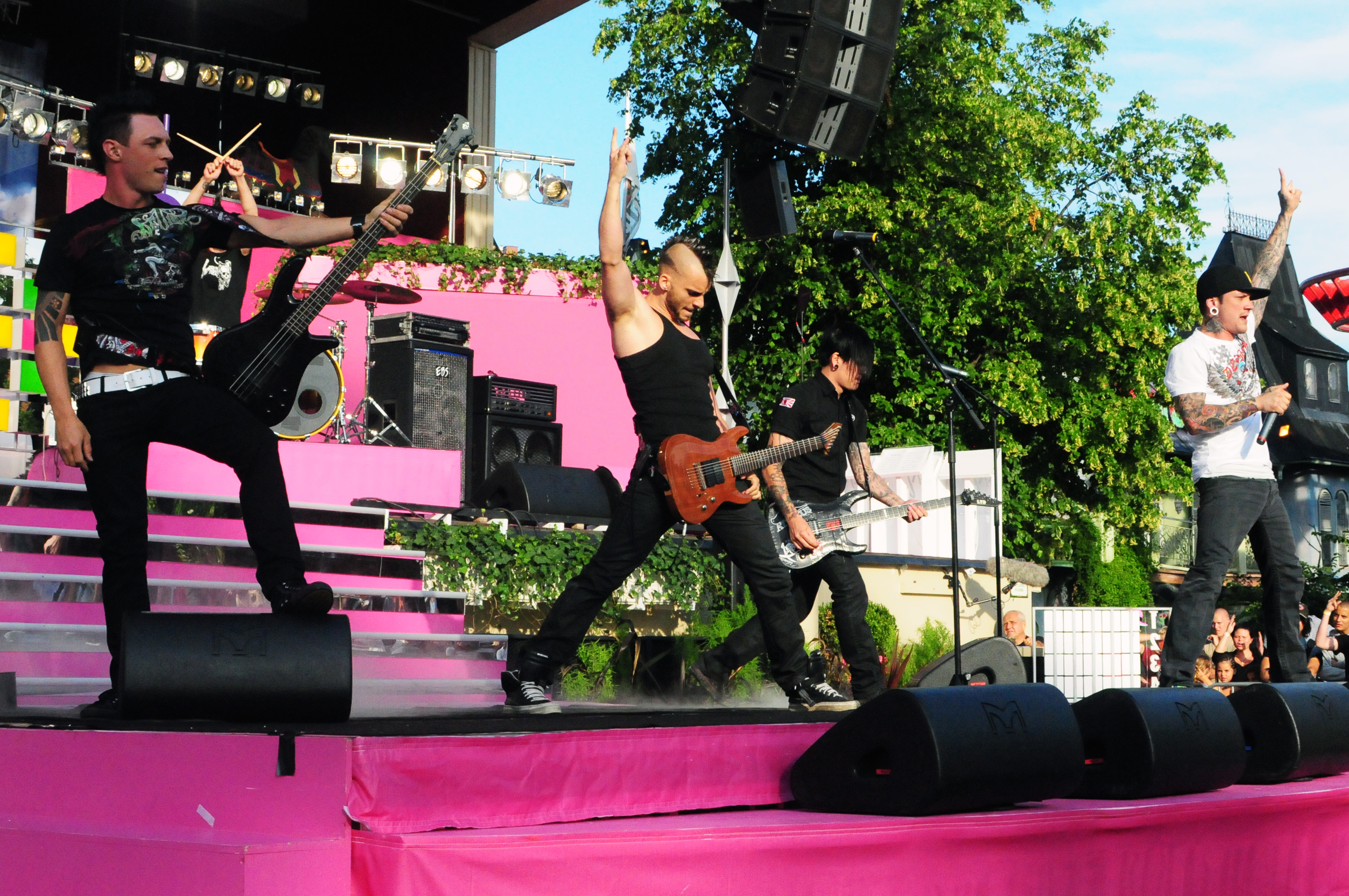
- Dead by April in 2009
- Studio albums: 5
- EPs: 2
- Compilation albums: 1
- Singles: 13
- Music videos: 10

Dead by April is a Swedish metal band from Gothenburg, formed in February 2007 by Pontus Hjelm and Jimmie Strimell. The band has released 5 studio albums, 1 compilation album, 7 music videos and 9 singles.

== Albums ==
=== Studio albums ===
Title	Album details	Peak positions		
Title	Album details	SWE	FIN	GER
Dead by April	Released: 13 May 2009; Label: Universal Music; Format: CD, digital download	2	–	–
Incomparable	Released: 21 September 2011; Label: Universal Music, Spinefarm; Format: CD, digital download	2	—	—
Let the World Know	Released: 12 February 2014; Label: Universal Music; Format: CD, digital download	5	36	99
Worlds Collide	Released: 7 April 2017; Label: Universal Music; Format: CD, digital download	8	—	—
The Affliction	Released: 26 January 2024; Label: Self-released; Format: CD, digital download, vinyl	—	—	—

=== Compilation albums ===
Title	Album details	Peak position (SWE)
Stronger	Released: 24 January 2011; Label: Universal music; Format: CD, digital download	1

=== Extended plays ===
Title	Album details	Peak position (SWE)
Worlds Collide (Jimmie Strimell Sessions)	Released: 1 September 2017; Label: Universal music; Format: Digital download	-
Worlds Collide (Acoustic Sessions)	Released: 20 October 2017; Label: Universal music; Format: Digital download	-

== Singles ==
Title	Year	Peak position (SWE)	Album
"Losing You"	2009	1	Dead by April
"What Can I Say"	2009	38	Dead by April
"Angels of Clarity"	2009	–	Dead by April
"Within My Heart"	2011	–	Incomparable
"Lost"	2011	–	Incomparable
"Calling"	2011	–	Incomparable
"Mystery"	2012	10	Incomparable: Mystery Version
"Freeze Frame"'	2013	–	Let the World Know
"As a Butterfly"'	2013	–	Let the World Know
"Breaking Point"	2016	–	Worlds Collide
"My Heart Is Crushable"	2017	–	Worlds Collide
"Perfect the Way You Are"	2017	–	Worlds Collide
"Warrior"	2017	–	Worlds Collide
"Numb" (Linkin Park cover)	2017	–	Non-album singles
"Memory"	2020	–	Non-album singles
"Bulletproof"	2020	–	Non-album singles
"Let It Go"	2020	–	Non-album singles
"Heartbeat Failing"	2021	–	The Affliction
"Collapsing"	2021	–	Non-album single
"Anything at All"	2021	–	The Affliction
"Better Than You"	2022	–	Non-album singles
"Me"	2022	–	Non-album singles
"Wasteland" (featuring The Day We Left Earth)	2023	×	The Affliction
"Dreamlike"	2023	×	The Affliction
"My Light"	2023	×	The Affliction
"Hurricane" (featuring The Day We Left Earth)	2023	×	The Affliction
"Feeding Demons" (featuring Self Deception)	2023	×	The Affliction
"Break My Fall" (featuring Samuel Ericsson)	2023	×	The Affliction
"Outcome" (featuring Smash Into Pieces and Samuel Ericsson)	2024	×	The Affliction
"Parasite" (featuring The Day We Left Earth and Cyhra)	2024	×	Non-album single
"Brain Tissue"	2025	×	Non-album single
"Naked"	2025	×	Non-album single

=== As featured artist ===
Title	Year	Peak position (SWE)	Album
Stronger (Lazee feat. Dead by April)	2010	–	Non-album single
Dance in the Neon Light (Lena Philipsson feat. Dead by April)	2011	50	Non-album single

== Music videos ==
Title	Year	Album	Director	Type	Link
Losing You	2009	Dead by April	Mikeadelica	Narrative	
Angels of Clarity	2009	Dead by April	Unknown	Performance	
Calling	2011	Incomparable	Mikeadelica	Narrative	
Lost	2011	Incomparable	David Guvå	Tour footage	
Stronger	2012	Stronger	Unknown	Tour footage	
Crossroads	2013	Incomparable	Mikeadelica	Performance	
As A Butterfly	2014	Let the World Know	Unknown	Narrative	
Beautiful Nightmare	2014	Let the World Know	Unknown	Performance	
Warrior	2017	Worlds Collide	Patric Ullaeus	Performance	
Heartbeat Failing	2021	The Affliction	Patric Ullaeus	Performance	
Collapsing	2021		Patric Ullaeus	Performance	
Anything At All	2021	The Affliction	Peter Lindgren	Performance	
Better Than You	2022		Joel Nilsson	Performance	
Dreamlike	2023	The Affliction	Peter Lindgren	Performance	
My Light	2023	The Affliction		Unknown	
Feeding Demons	2023	The Affliction		Unknown	
"Break My Fall"	2023	The Affliction	Peter Lindgren		
Outcome	2024	The Affliction	Peter Lindgren		
