= Breaking Point =

Breaking Point or The Breaking Point may refer to:

== General ==
- Breaking point (psychology), a critical moment of personal stress
- Breaking strength, in engineering, the stress at which a specimen fails via fracture

== Film ==
- The Breaking Point (1921 film), an American film by Paul Scardon
- The Breaking Point (1924 film), an American film by Herbert Brenon
- The Breaking Point (1950 film), an American adaptation of Ernest Hemingway's To Have and Have Not
- The Breaking Point (1961 film), a British crime film by Lance Comfort
- Breaking Point (1975 film), a Swedish erotic horror film by Bo Arne Vibenius
- Breaking Point (1976 film), an American film by Bob Clark
- Breaking Point (1989 film), an American television remake of the 1965 suspense film 36 Hours
- Breaking Point, a 1994 film starring Gary Busey
- Breaking Point (2005 film), a Canadian TV documentary about the 1995 Quebec sovereignty referendum
- Breaking Point (2009 film), an American action film starring Tom Berenger
- The Breaking Point (2014 film), an American action film of the 2010s
- Breaking Point (2023 film), a French thriller film

== Literature ==
- The Breaking Point (play), a 1923 play by Mary Roberts Rinehart
- The Breaking Point (short story collection), a 1959 short story collection by Daphne du Maurier
- Breaking Point (novel), a 2002 young adult novel by Alex Flinn
- The Breaking Point, a 1922 mystery novel by Mary Roberts Rinehart

== Music ==
- Breaking Point (band), an American hard rock/alternative rock band

=== Albums ===
- Breaking Point (Central Line album) (1982)
- Breaking Point (Digital Summer album) (2012)
- Breaking Point!, a 1964 album by Freddie Hubbard or its title composition
- Breaking Point (Lunatic Calm album) (2002)
- Breakin' Point, a 2016 album by Peter Bjorn and John

=== Songs ===
- "Breaking Point" (Bullet for My Valentine song) (2013)
- "Breaking Point" (Keri Hilson song) (2010)
- "Breakin' Point" (song), a 2016 song by Peter Bjorn and John
- "Breaking Point", a 1989 song by The Alarm
- "Breaking Point", a 2011 song by Amaranthe from Amaranthe
- "The Breaking Point", a song by Bacharach & David, covered by Normie Rowe
- "Breaking Point", a 1984 song by Bourgie Bourgie
- "Breaking Point", a 2013 song by The Browning from Hypernova
- "Breaking Point", a 2011 song by Crown the Empire from Limitless
- "Breaking Point", a 2017 song by Dead by April from Worlds Collide
- "Breaking Point", a 1988 song by the Moody Blues from Sur la Mer
- "Breaking Point", a 2007 song by Parkway Drive from Horizons

== Television ==
=== Series ===
- Breaking Point (1963 TV series), an American medical drama
- The Breaking Point (1991 TV series), a Hong Kong series
- Breaking Point (2010 TV series), a Discovery Channel Canada reality/documentary series
- Breaking Pointe, a 2012 American reality series
- Breaking Point (Casualty), the forty-second series of the television series Casualty (2024)

=== Episodes ===
- "Breaking Point" (Alias), 2003
- "Breaking Point" (Between the Lines), 1992
- "Breaking Point" (The Outer Limits), 2000
- "Breaking Point" (Run Away), 2026
- "Breaking Point" (Shameless), 2009
- "The Breaking Point" (Band of Brothers), 2001
- UFC 81: Breaking Point, a 2008 pay-per-view event
- WWE Breaking Point, a 2009 pay-per-view event

== Politics ==
- Breaking Point (UKIP poster), a 2016 Brexit referendum poster by the UK Independence Party

== See also ==
- Break Point (disambiguation)
- Breakpoint (disambiguation)
- Nervous breakdown (disambiguation)
- Point Break, a 1991 action film
- Point of no return
- Psychotic break
- Ultimate tensile strength
- Yield (engineering)
