= Incomparable (Dead by April album) =

Studio album by Dead by April
- Released: 21 September 2011
- Recorded: July 2010 – August 2011; Big Island Studios; Stockholm, Sweden
- Genres: Alternative metal, melodic metalcore, electronicore
- Length: 44:53
- Labels: Universal Music Group, Spinefarm
- Producers: Jacob Hellner, Pontus Hjelm

Dead by April chronology
Stronger (2011)	Incomparable (2011)	Let the World Know (2014)

Singles from Incomparable
- 1. "Within My Heart" Released: 16 May 2011; 2. "Calling" Released: 4 September 2011; 3. "Lost" Released: 19 September 2011; 4. "Crossroads" Released: 22 January 2013

Incomparable is the second studio album by Swedish metal band Dead by April. Production for the album took place after a lineup change of guitarists and vocalists for the band following the release of their self-titled debut. Incomparable was released on 21 September 2011 in the United States and most countries, and on 26 September in the United Kingdom, making it the first album by the band to be released in the US in the same time frame as its European release. The album's first official single, "Within My Heart", was released on 16 May 2011 as an EP containing two additional tracks to be featured on the album. The second single, "Calling", was released on 4 September with an accompanying music video released on 6 October. The third single, "Lost", was released on 19 September 2011, following the delay of the "Calling" music video.

Like the band's debut album, Incomparable included re-recorded demos as well as brand new tracks. On their debut album, only two out of 16 tracks were new, and the 14 others were re-recorded demo songs. Incomparable, however, has only one re-done demo (titled "Lost") while the other 12 songs on the standard edition are new. Two other early demos, "Painting Shadows" and "Unhateable", were also remade during the production of the album; the former was made the bonus track and the latter did not make it on the track list but was featured on the B-side of "Within My Heart". Incomparable charted at number two on the Swedish Albums Charts.

Main songwriter and former member Pontus Hjelm returned to fill in on guitar after Johan Olsson quit the band. However Hjelm was not immediately reinstated as an official member; he is credited separately from the other members in the liner notes and is absent from band photos. He finally rejoined Dead by April a year after the album's release. Like their previous album (and subsequent ones) all songs were written by Hjelm; with most co-written by vocalist Jimmie Strimell. Strimell was dismissed from Dead by April in April 2013, making Incomparable his final album with the band (though he would rejoin in a short album-less stint between 2017 and 2020).

== Background ==
Following the release of their self-titled debut in 2009, Dead by April toured extensively throughout Europe to promote album sales until mid-2010. On 23 April 2010 it was announced on the band's official MySpace page that founding member Pontus Hjelm had officially left Dead by April in order to focus on his songwriting but would continue writing music for Dead by April, telling the fans that "nothing is different in the songwriting department". The replacement for Pontus Hjelm became vocalist Zandro Santiago. The band did not recruit a replacement guitarist as they felt it would not affect their sound to continue with only one guitarist. However, the last remaining guitarist, Johan Olsson, also left the band in late 2010 for personal reasons, wanting to work on his clothing line. During his time in the band, Johan had also worked as an assisting promoter. When he left he opined that he had merely worked with Dead by April, as opposed to being a member of the band. In an interview he stated: "I loved doing Dead by April, but I haven't really been involved in the songwriting process, and I wanted to do something on my own and that conflicted with the band's style." With the lineup changes, Pontus returned as a "session" player for the album and upcoming promotional tour, though he rejoined officially in 2012.

The album began mixing in the second quarter of 2011 and concluded on 19 April 2011. On 4 July the band announced the title of the new album to be "Incomparable", and it was announced on 11 July that it would be released on 21 September, though it was rumored to be delayed in early August to a possible 7 November release date. The album cover was originally going to be released by the band on Facebook once they reached 230,000 "likes", but other sites leaked the cover so the band released it early. The cover features a sky blue background with the same "Dead by April" logo as their self-titled album. The center shows a Japanese girl with blood and a black substance coming out of her mouth, similar to scenes from The Grudge. The album is said to be heavier and more dynamic than their self-titled album. Zandro Santiago commented on the band's genre, stating that, "[Dead by April is a] metal and boyband pop. Metal fans might not handle it properly."

The album was finalized in August, where the band announced more details about it. It was confirmed that the album used executive producer Jacob Hellner along with mixing by Stefan Glaumann, both of whom worked together on every Rammstein album to date. The band commented on the album and its production, saying, "The new recordings are now complete, and we're delighted with the way they've turned out — they are WAY beyond anything we've done before, smashing our debut! Jacob Hellner has given us the heaviness we've always craved... we are super-excited, and can't wait for our fans, and everyone else, to hear the results!" The album was accidentally leaked on 3 September 2011, with Universal Music Group working to remove all leaks.

== Singles and promotion ==
In August 2010, the band released a minute-long teaser for the album's first single titled "Within My Heart". Before the full single was released, however, the band released a compilation album, Stronger, that contained a demo version of a new song, "More Than Yesterday", that would be featured on the album. The song soon became played during the band's live shows and a recording video was released for the song. The release of the single "Within My Heart" was delayed several months following difficulties getting the band's discography on sale on the iTunes Store. The single was finally released on 16 May 2011 as an EP containing two other songs: "Two-Faced" and "Unhateable". The song "Unhateable" is actually a rerecording of an old song that was recorded in 2007 but not included on the band's debut album. Another new song, "You Should Know", was added to the live playlist for the band in July 2011, though the studio version did not appear until the album itself was released the following September.

The second single for the album, "Calling", was set to be released on 19 September, along with the first music video for the album. It was released on 4 September but the video was not released until October 6 due to delays in the video shoot. The single had actually appeared a few months prior during a live performance on 11 July 2011 as an encore song. Because the "Calling" music video was delayed, the band released a third single, "Lost", which included a b-side of a heavier mix of "Promise Me", which was released on 19 September, the intended release date for "Calling". On 22 August the band released a teaser of the rerecorded version of the track "Lost", the first of what was a series of teasers released every Monday until the album was released. The second was "You Should Know", third was "Calling", fourth was "Too Late", and the final teaser was "Last Goodbye". The band also released a clip of the music video for "Calling" a few weeks prior to release. Also, to promote the album, the band played a few acoustic shows at Bengan's Record Store in Stockholm, Sweden in July 2011, where the vinyl edition of Incomparable was announced.

For promotional touring for the album, the band played at Sonisphere Festival in Sweden on July 9 and the band will continue to tour at the end of 2011 following the release of the album. Due to extensive touring, drummer Alexander Svenningson chose to take a few months off to rest his ears, as recording for the album had already concluded. Jonas Ekdahl, the drummer Strimell's other band, Death Destruction, replaced Alexander Jonas until he returned for more shows. In late September, Dead by April played at Debaser Medis in Stockholm and in Gothenburg at Sticky Fingers three days later for a few album release shows. Following the release of the album, the band plotted a UK tour, "The SlaughTour 2011", which was scheduled to begin on 8 November, with the band playing each day until 13 November, in venues including Southampton, Birmingham, London, Glasgow, Newcastle, and Manchester. Supporting acts for the UK tour include Marionette, Machinae Supremacy, and Overload. The tour was delayed to December 2011, with the same locations, but Machinae Supremacy dropped out of the tour and One Without replaced them.

== Critical reception ==
Professional ratings
Review scores
Source	Rating
AllMusic	2.5/5 stars
HD	1/5 stars
Imperiumi	9.5/10 stars
Rush on Rock	4/10 stars
Rockfreaks.net	3.5/10 stars

Gabriel Pio of The New Review called the album better than Dead by April's debut album, but noted that "For those of you who expect Dead by April to bring the heavy, don’t hold your breath." While the review criticized the lyrics, both singing and screaming were complimented for both Zandro Santiago and Jimmie Strimmel, respectively. The band was called "The metal version of Backstreet Boys" as a compliment, and the review concluded that despite its flaws, "Incomparable is without a doubt one of the best releases this year within the genre." A review from Swedish publication HD gave the album an overall score of one out five, calling it "a really bad example of boy band meets metal." The review noted the imbalance between the two genres and called the joint attempt "odd sticking". The review concluding by saying the band was "careless with both songwriting and arrangements" and that Incomparable is "certainly not a good album."

== Commercial performance ==
Similarly to the band's debut album, Incomparable debuted at number two on the national Swedish album charts, the band's homeland. The album was outsold only by Melissa Horn's Innan jag kände dig, which was in its second week of release and had already reached gold status in Sweden.

== Track listing ==
All tracks are written by Pontus Hjelm and Jimmie Strimell; except "Mystery" written by Pontus Hjelm; and "Crossroads" written by Pontus Hjelm and Robert Habolin.

No.	Title	Length
1.	"Dreaming"	4:15
2.	"Real & True"	3:06
3.	"Within My Heart"	3:25
4.	"More Than Yesterday"	3:30
5.	"Calling"	3:37
6.	"Two Faced"	3:04
7.	"Crossroads"	2:56
8.	"Incomparable"	3:23
9.	"Too Late"	3:14
10.	"You Should Know"	3:46
11.	"When You Wake Up"	3:44
12.	"Lost"	3:34
13.	"Last Goodbye"	3:19
Total length:		44:53

iTunes & Japanese Version
No.	Title	Length
14.	"Painting Shadows"	3:34

Mystery Version
No.	Title	Length
14.	"Mystery"	2:58
15.	"Painting Shadows"	3:34
16.	"Unhateable"	3:00

== Singles and videos ==
=== Within My Heart ===
Within My Heart
No.	Title	Length
1.	"Within My Heart"	3:24
2.	"Two Faced"	3:04
3.	"Unhateable"	3:00

=== Calling ===
Calling
No.	Title	Length
1.	"Calling (Album version)"	3:36
2.	"Calling (Radio Edit)"	3:34
3.	"Within My Heart (Video Violence)"	3:21

=== Lost ===
Lost
No.	Title	Length
1.	"Lost"	3:35
2.	"Promise Me (Heavier Mix)"	3:32

== Personnel ==
Credits for Incomparable adapted from Allmusic.

Dead by April

- Jimmie Strimell – screamed vocals, clean vocals
- Zandro Santiago – clean vocals
- Marcus Wesslén – bass guitar
- Alexander Svenningson – drums, percussion

Guests

- Pontus Hjelm - lead and rhythm guitar, keyboards, backing vocals, additional production
- Peter Mansson - Acoustic guitar on song #7 "Crossroads"
- Erik Arvinder with "The Dreaming People" - String instruments on song #7 "Crossroads"

=== Production ===
- Jacob Hellner - executive producer, recording, programming, mastering
- Stefan Glaumann - mixing, additional production
- Peter Mansson - mixing, additional production
- Mats Limpan Lindfors - Mastering

== Chart positions ==
Country	Position
Swedish Albums (Sverigetopplistan)	2
Japanese Albums Chart	118

== Release history ==
Region	Date	Label	Format	Catalog	Ref
United States	September 21, 2011	Universal Music Group, Spinefarm	CD, digital download, Limited Edition CD	2776322	
Japan	September 21, 2011	Universal Music Group, Spinefarm	CD, digital download, Limited Edition CD	4988005676054	
European Union	September 26, 2011	Universal Music Group, Spinefarm	CD, digital download, Limited Edition CD	B00599UF4S	
Online import	September 21, 2011	Universal Music Group, Spinefarm	Vinyl LP	UNI-0602527-79043	
