= Break Point =

Break Point may refer to:

- Break Point (film), a 2014 American comedy directed by Jay Karas
- Break Point (2021 TV series), an Indian documentary series
- Break Point (2023 TV series), a documentary series released by Netflix
- "Break Point" (Suits), a 2012 TV episode
- "Break Point" (Emily in Paris), a 2024 TV episode
- Break Point (novel), a 2002 novel by Rosie Rushton
- Break point (tennis), a chance for the receiver to win a game

== See also ==
- Breakpoint (disambiguation)
- Breaking Point (disambiguation)
- Point Break (disambiguation)
