= DbA =

DbA may refer to:

- A-weighted decibels
- Dead by April
