= Point Break (disambiguation) =

Point Break is a 1991 action film.

Point Break may also refer to:

- Point Break (2015 film), a remake of the 1991 film
- Point Break Live!, a play and parody of the 1991 film by Jaime Keeling
- Point Break (group), a British pop group
- Point break, a type of surf break

== See also ==
- Break Point (disambiguation)
