= Sticks and Stones (disambiguation) =

"Sticks and Stones" is a children's rhyme.

Sticks and Stones may also refer to:

== Film and television ==
- Sticks & Stones, a 1996 film featuring Gary Busey
- Sticks and Stones: An Exploration of the Blair Witch Legend, a 1999 short film
- Sticks & Stones (2019 film), a stand-up comedy show by Dave Chappelle
- Sticks and Stones (TV series), a 2019 British drama series
- "Sticks and Stones" (Doctors), a 2004 television episode
- "Sticks and Stones" (Murder, She Wrote), a 1985 television episode
- "Sticks and Stones" (My Name Is Earl), a 2006 television episode
- "Sticks and Stones" (Outlander), a 2022 television episode

== Literature ==
- Sticks and Stones, a 2004 graphic novel by Peter Kuper
- Sticks and Stones, a 2005 novel by Catherine MacPhail
- Sticks and Stones, a 1976 novel by Susan Price
- Sticks and Stones, a 1975 play by James Reaney

== Music ==
- Sticks and Stones (band), a Scottish folk rock band

=== Albums ===
- Sticks and Stones (The 77s album), 1990
- Sticks and Stones (Cher Lloyd album), 2011
- Sticks and Stones (Dave Grusin and Don Grusin album) or the title song, 1988
- Sticks and Stones (Moe album) or the title song, 2008
- Sticks and Stones (New Found Glory album), 2002
- Sticks and Stones (Tracy Lawrence album) or the title song (see below), 1991
- Sticks 'n' Stones (EP) or the title song, by Jamie T, 2009

=== Songs ===
- "Sticks & Stones" (Arlissa song), 2013
- "Sticks & Stones" (Joyner Lucas and Conway the Machine song), 2024
- "Sticks and Stones" (Nicola Roberts song), 2011
- "Sticks and Stones" (Titus Turner song), 1959
- "Sticks and Stones" (Tracy Lawrence song), 1991
- "Sticks and Stones", by Alien Ant Farm from Anthology, 2001
- "Sticks and Stones", by Aly & AJ from Into the Rush, 2005
- "Sticks and Stones", by Babyshambles from Down in Albion, 2005
- "Sticks and Stones", by Blur from The Ballad of Darren (Japanese version), 2023
- "Sticks and Stones", by Bronze Radio Return from Shake! Shake! Shake!, 2011
- "Sticks and Stones", by Carmel from The Falling, 1986
- "Sticks & Stones", by the Creepshow, 2017
- "Sticks & Stones", by the Divine Comedy from Absent Friends, 2004
- "Stickz N Stonez" by J. Cole from Might Delete Later, 2024
- "Sticks and Stones", by Jónsi from the How to Train Your Dragon soundtrack, 2010
- "Sticks 'n' Stones", by Karine Polwart from Traces, 2012
- "Sticks & Stones", by KSI from Jump Around, 2016
- "Sticks and Stones", by Mudvayne, 2025
- "Sticks and Stones", by X Ambassadors from Townies, 2024

== Other uses ==
- Sticks & Stones (board game), a 1978 board wargame by Metagaming Concepts
- Stars and bars (combinatorics), or sticks and stones, a method in combinatorial mathematics

== See also ==
- Sticks and Stones and Broken Bones, a 1991 album by the Toll
