= Breakpoint (disambiguation) =

A breakpoint is an execution stop point in the code of a computer program.

Breakpoint or break point may also refer to:

- BCR (gene), the gene that encodes the breakpoint cluster region protein
- Break point, in tennis
- Break Point, a 2002 novel by Rosie Rushton
- Break Point (film), a 2015 U.S. comedy film
- Breakpoint (demoparty), a German demoscene party
- Breakpoint (meteorology), a location referred to by meteorologists when issuing watches, warnings, or advisories for specific areas
- Breakpoint (novel) a 2007 novel by Richard A. Clarke
- Breakpoint ("The Shield"), a 2003 episode of the television show The Shield
- Breakpoint, an indicator of a microbial organism's susceptibility or resistance to a particular antimicrobial; see Minimum inhibitory concentration
- "Breakpoint", a song by Megadeth on the 1995 album Hidden Treasures

== See also ==
- Break Point (disambiguation)
- Breaking point (disambiguation)
- Point Break, a 1991 action film
- Tom Clancy's Ghost Recon Breakpoint, a 2019 online video game by Ubisoft
