= Chloe Sanderson =

Chloe Sanderson may refer to:

- Chloe Sanderson, character in McLeod's Daughters
- Chloe Sanderson, character in Best Friends Getting Sorted
