= Love, Lies and Lizzie =

2009 novel by Rosie Rushton

- Book's cover
- Author: Rosie Rushton
- Original title: Love, Lies and Lizzie
- Cover artist: Susan Hellard
- Language: English, Americain
- Series: 21st century Austen
- Genre: Young adult novel
- Publisher: Piccadilly Press
- Publication date: January 25, 2009
- Publication place: United Kingdom
- Media type: Print (Paperback)
- Pages: 208 ppya–novel
- ISBN: 978-1-85340-979-0
- Preceded by: Secret Schemes and Daring Dreams
- Followed by: Echoes of Love

Love, Lies and Lizzie, a young adult romance novel, is the fourth installment of Rosie Rushton's Jane Austen in the 21st Century series.

== Plot summary ==
The book, which was published in 2009, is based on Jane Austen's 1813 novel Pride and Prejudice. It tells the story of the main character, Lizzie Bennet, dumping her boyfriend—Toby. Lizzie's sister, Jane, was surprised by it because Toby is crazy about Lizzie.

It also talks about the mother, Mrs Bennet, telling her five daughters that the family is moving to the new house at Priory Park. At first, the sisters did not feel good about being there but they soon got involved in parties and James Darcy's life.
