= Losing You (Dead by April song) =

Single by Dead by April

from the album Dead by April
- B-side: "My Saviour"
- Released: 6 March 2009
- Genre: Nu metal, melodic metalcore, alternative metal
- Length: 3:55
- Label: Universal
- Songwriter(s): Pontus Hjelm and Jimmie Strimell

Dead by April singles chronology
"Falling Behind" (2007)	"Losing You" (2009)	"What Can I Say" (2009)

Dead by April UK singles chronology
"Losing You" (2009)	"Angels of Clarity" (2009)

"Losing You" is the debut single by Swedish heavy metal band Dead by April and is the first single from their self-titled debut album Dead by April. The single was released on 6 March 2009. "Losing You" is the first physical CD single by the band. The single was only released in Europe with only the title track, but in support of their UK tour they gave out a reissue of the single entitled "Losing You/My Saviour" in the UK, which features an alternative version of the title track and the previously unreleased track "My Saviour".

== Track listing ==
EU CD single

No.	Title	Writer(s)	Length
1.	"Losing You" (Album Version)	Pontus Hjelm & Jimmie Strimell	3:53

Promo CD

No.	Title	Writer(s)	Length
1.	"Losing You" (Album Version)	Pontus Hjelm & Jimmie Strimell	3:53
2.	"Losing You" (Radio Edit)	Pontus Hjelm & Jimmie Strimell	3:30

UK CD single

No.	Title	Writer(s)	Length
1.	"Losing You" (Alternative Version)	Pontus Hjelm & Jimmie Strimell	3:56
2.	"My Saviour" (Non-album Track)	Pontus Hjelm & Jimmie Strimell	3:13

iTunes single

No.	Title	Writer(s)	Length
1.	"Losing You" (Album Version)	Pontus Hjelm & Jimmie Strimell	3:53
2.	"Losing You" (Edit Version)	Pontus Hjelm & Jimmie Strimell	3:30

UK/iTunes EP

No.	Title	Writer(s)	Length
1.	"Losing You"	Pontus Hjelm & Jimmie Strimell	3:57
2.	"Trapped" (Heavier Mix)	Pontus Hjelm	3:06
3.	"Stronger" (Heavier Mix)	Pontus Hjelm & Jimmie Strimell	3:58
4.	"Angels of Clarity" (Heavier Mix)	Pontus Hjelm & Jimmie Strimell	3:39

== Charts ==
=== Weekly charts ===
Chart (2009)	Peak position
Sweden (Sverigetopplistan)	1

=== Year-end charts ===
Chart (2009)	Position
Sweden (Sverigetopplistan)	11

== Personnel ==
- Jimmie Strimell - lead vocals (clean and unclean)
- Pontus Hjelm - backing vocals, guitar, keyboards
- Johan Olsson - guitar
- Marcus Wesslén - bass guitar
- Alexander Svenningson - drums
