= Stronger (Dead by April album) =

Compilation album by Dead by April
- Released: 24 January 2011
- Recorded: 2009–2010
- Genre: Alternative metal, melodic metalcore
- Label: Universal

Dead by April chronology
Dead by April (2009)	Stronger (2011)	Incomparable (2011)

Singles from Stronger
- 1. "Love Like Blood/Promise Me" Released: 10 May 2010

Stronger is the first compilation by Swedish alternative metal band Dead by April. It was released on 24 January 2011. The album features some b-sides, acoustic versions, remixes, cover songs as well as an unreleased demo version of the song "More Than Yesterday" as well as two unreleased re-recorded acoustic versions. This is the first release by the band to feature Zandro Santiago as lead vocalist.

== Track listing ==
No.	Title	Length
1.	"Trapped" (Heavier mix)	3:06
2.	"Angels of Clarity" (Heavier mix)	3:39
3.	"Stronger" (Heavier mix)	3:58
4.	"My Saviour"	3:13
5.	"Leaves Falling"	3:23
6.	"Love Like Blood" (Killing Joke cover)	3:41
7.	"Angels of Clarity" (Shawn 'Clown' Crahan Remix)	4:35
8.	"Losing You" (Acoustic version)	3:50
9.	"Promise Me" (Acoustic version)	3:13
10.	"More Than Yesterday" (Demo version)	3:29
11.	"Stronger (Heavier Mix) (Video)" (iTunes Bonus)	4:00

== Song information ==
- Track 1, 2 and 3 are new mixed songs; originally from the UK single of Losing You.
- Track 4 and 5 are bonus tracks; from their debut album Dead by April.
- Track 6 is a Killing Joke cover; from their single Love Like Blood/Promise Me.
- Track 7 is a remixed version of the song made by Shawn Crahan; from their single Angels of Clarity.
- Track 8 and 9 are studio recorded acoustic versions of the songs. Not to be confused with the studio recorded versions found on the Angels of Clarity single which featured the vocals of Pontus Hjelm and Jimmie Strimell instead of Zandro Santiago.
- Track 10 is a demo version of the song; the final version is included on their second album Incomparable

== Personnel ==
Dead by April

- Jimmie Strimell – unclean and clean vocals
- Zandro Santiago - clean vocals (only on track 6, 8, 9 & 10)
- Marcus Wesslén – bass guitar
- Alexander Svenningson – drums

Additional musicians

- Pontus Hjelm - guitars, keyboards, programming, backing vocals
- Johan Olsson - guitars
- Shawn 'Clown' Crahan (of Slipknot) - composition of track 7
