= Jay Ray =

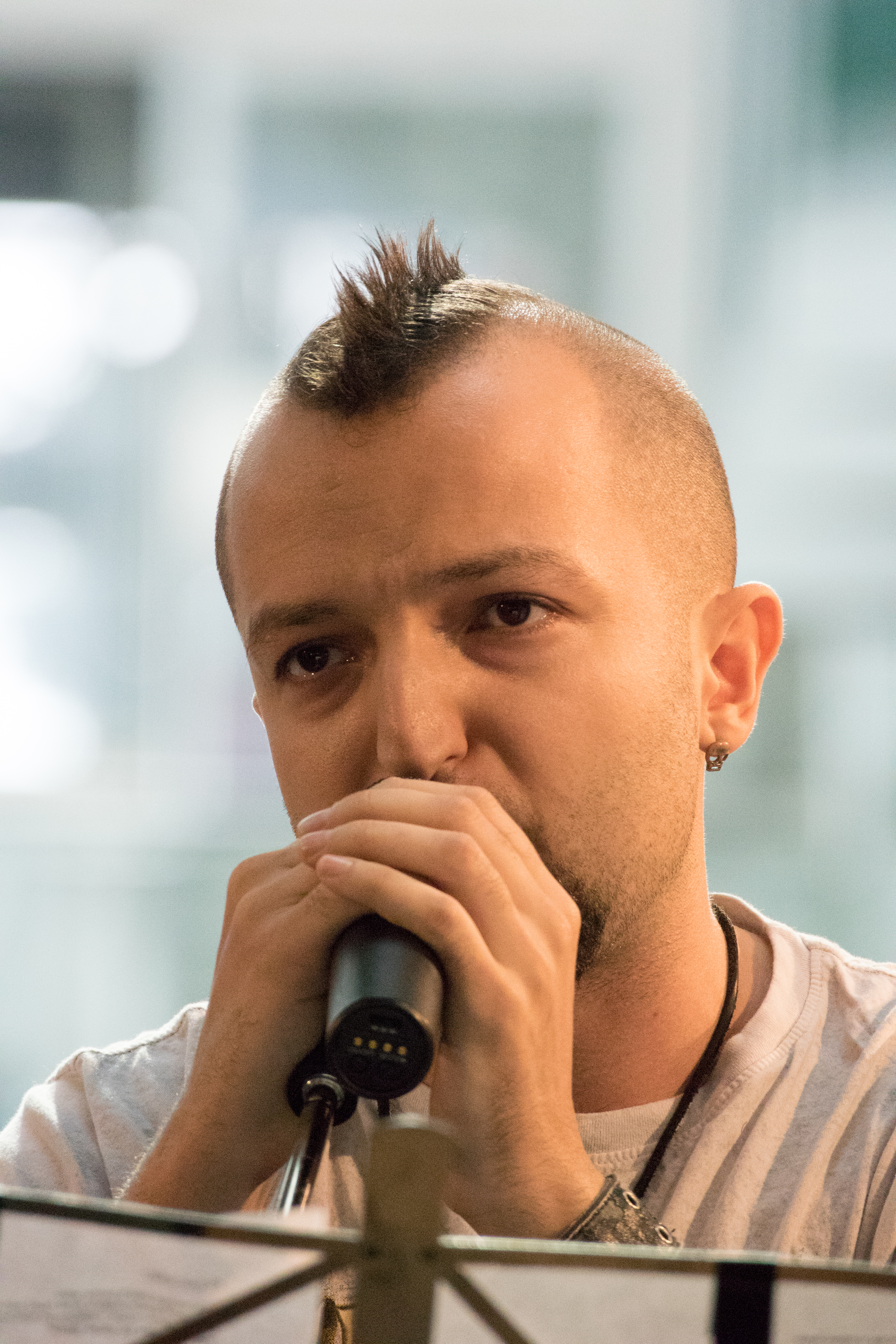

Background information
- Born: Joni Säde; 15 July 1986 (age 40)
- Origin: Salo, Finland
- Genres: Electronic rock; alternative metal
- Occupations: Singer, songwriter, music producer
- Instrument: Guitar
- Years active: 2010–present
- Label: ColdFire Records
- Website: jayraymusic.com

Joni Säde (born 15 June 1986), known professionally as Jay Ray, is a Finnish singer, songwriter and music producer based in Salo, Finland. He is widely recognized for his unique blend of electro-cinematic rock and metal which fuses elements from diverse genres of music.

== Biography ==
Jay Ray was born in Finland to a Ukrainian mother and a Finnish father. His interest in music was developed during his teenage years, leading him to dedicate extensive hours to the exploration of various music production software. Simultaneously, he started to take guitar lessons. In the early 2000s, Jay Ray founded the band Inhale with his friends. During their initial phase, the group predominantly focused on covering songs from renowned bands such as Metallica and Blink 182. However, as time elapsed, they gradually incorporated original compositions into their repertoire.

In 2010, Jay Ray's dedication to the musical arts experienced a notable intensification, and his artistic inclinations underwent a transformation, embracing a fusion of metal and electronic influences. Despite the commendable progress of his band Inhale, Jay Ray experienced a profound sense of misalignment within the group, prompting him to make the decision of pursuing a solo career.

In 2011, as part of his initial foray into solo pursuit, Jay Ray actively engaged in various remix competitions, a venture that proved to be highly successful. Notably, during the Serj Tankian Competition, where Serj Tankian personally selected him as the winner. Jay Ray is known for infusing his remixes with his own vocal performances.

In 2012, Jay Ray released his debut single, Crucial Fracture, marking a pivotal moment in his solo career. Subsequently, in the buildup to his studio album, Jay Ray also released a series of additional singles and collaboration tracks. During these years, he collaborated with several prominent European musicians such as The Dread, Sapphires, Paul Udarov, Dead Silence Hides My Cries, Fredi Fate, Entropy Zero and others. In 2015, Jay Ray collaborated with Mikko Kouki and released the music video for his single "You Were There", the single received positive reviews from multiple news outlets.

Jay Ray's inaugural studio album, Self-Resonance, was officially released on 23 September 2017. The album's compositions, including tracks such as "King Vultures", "The Great Art of Living", "137" and "Crucial Fracture" have garnered notable prominence as they have been featured within the video game Wreckfest developed by the Finnish game studio Bugbear Entertainment. Another single from the album is "Striven", a song showcasing the collaborative efforts of Jay Ray and the esteemed vocalist Marko Saaresto of the renowned Finnish rock band Poets of the Fall. Self-Resonance received favorable reviews from various Finnish and other European music news websites.

Following the release of his album, Jay Ray subsequently released two singles, The Edge and Flame of Fate in 2018, in collaboration with the Belarusian musician Entropy Zero. Notably, these compositions were primarily created for the mobile racing game Demolition Derby 3. In 2020, Jay Ray's single titled 137 was released and it featured in a commercial for Laughing Man Coffee featuring acclaimed personalities Hugh Jackman and Ryan Reynolds. In 2021, Jay Ray collaborated with Paul Udarov, resulting in the release of their single titled Heartless. Later in 2021, Jay Ray collaborated with Jimmie Strimell and released the single titled Cold Light.

== Discography ==
Jay Ray's Discography
Year	Title	Artist	Type	Notes
2011	I Can't Wait	Celldweller	Remix	Metal Remix by Jay Ray
2011	Live The Life	J.Scott G	Remix	Metal Remix by Jay Ray
2011	Eleven Miles	The Dread	Single	featuring Jay Ray
2011	See Through Me	The Dread	Single	featuring Jay Ray
2012	Figure It Out	Serj Tankian	Remix	Metal Remix by Jay Ray
2012	Your Body	Christina Aguilera	Remix	Metal Remix by Jay Ray
2012	Carriers	Sapphires	Single	featuring Jay Ray
2012	Lost Chance	Paul Udarov & Jay Ray	Single	radio edit, featuring Jay Ray
2012	Crucial Fracture	Jay Ray	Single	–
2013	The Helping Hand	Dead Silence Hides My Cries	Single	chorus vocals, featuring Jay Ray
2013	My Inspiration	Dead Silence Hides My Cries	Single	outro vocals, featuring Jay Ray
2013	Mä En Oo Niinku Sä	Fredi Fate	Single	featuring Jay Ray
2014	Anna Mun Elää	Mc Mane & Jay Ray	Single	featuring Jay Ray
2014	The Great Art of Living	Jay Ray	Single	–
2014	The Great Art of Living	Jay Ray	Music videos	–
2014	In The End	Linkin Park	Cover songs	Vocal Cover by Jay Ray
2015	Lost Chance	Paul Udarov & Jay Ray	Single	featuring Jay Ray
2015	You Were There	Jay Ray	Single	–
2015	Promo EP	Jay Ray	Albums	–
2015	Lost Chance	Paul Udarov & Jay Ray	Music videos	–
2015	You Were There	Jay Ray	Music videos	–
2015	Fallen	Volbeat	Cover songs	Vocal Cover by Jay Ray
2017	137	Jay Ray	Single	–
2017	Striven	Jay Ray	Single	featuring Marko Saaresto
2017	Self-Resonance	Jay Ray	Albums	debut album
2017	137	Jay Ray	Music videos	–
2017	Striven	Jay Ray	Music videos	featuring Marko Saaresto
2017	Left of You	Jay Ray	Music videos	–
2017	My December	Linkin Park	Cover songs	Vocal Cover by Jay Ray
2017	Numb	Linkin Park	Cover songs	Vocal Cover by Jay Ray
2018	The Edge	Entropy Zero	Single	featuring Jay Ray
2018	Flame of Fate	Entropy Zero	Single	featuring Jay Ray
2018	King Vultures	Jay Ray	Music videos	–
2018	The Edge	Entropy Zero	Music videos	featuring Jay Ray
2021	Heartless	Paul Udarov & Jay Ray	Single	featuring Jay Ray
2021	Cold Light	Jay Ray	Music videos	featuring Jimmie Strimell
2022	Cold Light	Jay Ray	Single	featuring Jimmie Strimell
