= Marionette (band) =

Swedish melodic death metal band

- Origin: Gothenburg, Sweden
- Genre: Melodic death metal
- Years active: 2005–2017
- Label: Listenable Records
- Members: Alexander Andersson; Mikael Medin; Anton Modig; Aron Parmerud; Linus Johansson; Jimmie Olausson

Marionette was a Swedish melodic death metal band from Gothenburg. Formed in 2005, the band achieved recognition from placing high in, and often winning, many national and international music contests. They were inspired by the Japanese visual-kei scene and Swedish hardcore and metal.

== Career ==
Founded in 2005, Marionette made a name for themselves in the Swedish metal scene by winning and placing high in many national and international music contests. In support of the EP Terror Hearts, mixed and mastered by Fredrick Nordström (In Flames, At the Gates), Marionette shared the stage with metal acts including Machine Head, Slayer, Mastodon, Meshuggah, and Candlemass, among others.

In January 2008, Marionette recorded its debut album, Spite, with Swedish producers Simon Exner (As You Drown) and two-time Swedish Grammy winner Åke Parmerud. Spite was mixed and mastered by Christian Silver (Sonic Syndicate). Spite was released in April 2008 and received positive reviews from mainstream and underground publications around Europe. The album was released in North America in September of the same year via France's Listenable Records.

Marionette made its debut European tour in October 2008, following a showcase at PopKomm in Berlin, increasing the band's prominence in the European metal scene. Marionette toured with Die Apokalyptischen Reiter for Reiterfestspiele 2008 tour. With the support the band's growing UK fan base and acclaim from Metal Hammer and Kerrang! magazines, Marionette headlined a short UK tour in January 2009. Marionette joined the Deathstars and Sonic Syndicate for the Scandinavian dates of the Death Syndicate European Tour in February and March 2009. In April 2009, Marionette joined the Deathstars on the UK leg of its Night Electric Night Tour. Following the aforementioned tour, Marionette began writing its second full-length album, Enemies.

As on Spite, Marionette assembled a production team for Enemies that included Pontus Hjelm (Dead by April) and two-time Swedish Grammy award-winning producer Åke Parmerud. Fredrik Nordström (In Flames, At the Gates, Bring Me the Horizon) and Peter in De Betou (Dimmu Borgir, Meshuggah) mixed and mastered the album, respectively. Enemies met critical acclaim on its European release in late 2009, and early 2010 in North America and Japan. The band's aggressive sound, "stylistic depth", "technical cohesion", and ability to juggle heaviness and commercial appeal were recognized. Heavy touring followed, including Scandinavian dates with Five Finger Death Punch and Shadows Fall in November 2009 and European and UK tour with Blessthefall. Enemies was nominated for a Swedish Metal Award in the "Best Death Metal Album" category in 2009.

In July 2010, Marionette entered Studio Fredman with Fredrik Nordström to record the band's then-unnamed third album, the first to feature new vocalist Alexander Andersson, who replaced Axel Widén (ZombieKrig) in spring of the same year. The band took a break from recording in fall 2010 to headlined The SlaughTour 2010 of the UK and Denmark and to support Dark Tranquillity for the final Scandinavian dates of its Where Death Is Most Alive Part II Tour. In November 2010, Marionette signed a worldwide publishing deal with Warner Chappell Music, becoming the third metal band to signed with the company's Swedish branch (the other two being Meshuggah and Sabaton). In January 2010, Marionette toured Europe support the Murderdolls. In February 2011, Marionette completed the mix of its third album at PH Studio in Gothenburg with Pontus Hjelm, whom the band had worked with on the Enemies album.

In May 2011, Marionette announced they would tour Europe and the UK on "The SlaughTour 2011" with Swedish pop-metallers Dead By April. "The SlaughTour 2011" covered Denmark, Netherlands, Germany, Austria, France, and the UK in October and November 2011.

== Members ==
Name	Instrument	Membership
Alexander Andersson	vocals	2010–2017
Mikael Medin	bass guitar	2005–2017
Anton Modig	guitar	2008–2017
Aron Parmerud	guitar, vocals	2005–2017
Linus Johansson	keyboard	2005–2017
Jimmie Olausson	drums	2005–2017
Johan Sporre	guitar and vocals	2005–2008
Axel Widén	vocals	2005–2010

== Discography ==
Studio albums

- Spite (2008)
- Enemies (2009)
- Nerve (2011)
- Propaganda (2016)
