= Let the World Know =

Studio album by Dead by April
- Released: 12 February 2014
- Recorded: October 2012 – November 2013
- Genre: Melodic metalcore, electronicore
- Length: 49:00
- Label: Universal Music Group
- Producer: Pontus Hjelm

Dead by April chronology
Incomparable (2011)	Let the World Know (2014)	Worlds Collide (2017)

Singles from Let the World Know
- 1. "Freeze Frame" Released: 25 May 2013; 2. "As a Butterfly" Released: 6 December 2013; 3. "Beautiful Nightmare" Released: 14 November 2014

Let the World Know is the third studio album by Swedish metal band Dead by April. The album is the first without former vocalist Jimmie Strimell who had since been replaced by Christoffer Andersson, current member of What Tomorrow Brings. The album is also the last to feature original drummer Alexander Svenningson and clean vocalist Zandro Santiago, who both left in 2014. Three of the songs on the album, "As a Butterfly", "Beautiful Nightmare" and "Hold On", were re-recorded in 2019 with Jimmie Strimell and Pontus Hjelm on lead vocals and Marcus Rosell on drums.

== History ==
The album was announced in posts of the band regarding their recording progress, dating back as early as October 2012, and was announced to have been completed in November 2013, making the album's approximate recording time 13 months. The track list and the album's cover were released on 9 December 2013 on the band's official Facebook page.

== Track listing ==
All tracks are written by Pontus Hjelm.

No.	Title	Length
1.	"Beautiful Nightmare"	4:06
2.	"Abnormal"	4:15
3.	"Empathy"	3:57
4.	"Done With Broken Hearts"	3:12
5.	"As a Butterfly"	4:52
6.	"Same Star"	3:20
7.	"Let the World Know"	3:50
8.	"Peace of Mind"	3:17
9.	"Freeze Frame"	3:58
10.	"Infinity x Infinity"	3:10
11.	"My Tomorrow"	4:02
12.	"Hold On"	3:36
13.	"Replace You"	3:25
Total length:		49:00

Japanese edition bonus track
No.	Title	Length
14.	"Cause I Need You"	4:18

== Personnel ==
Dead by April

- Zandro Santiago – clean vocals
- Christoffer Andersson – unclean vocals
- Pontus Hjelm – guitars, keyboards, programming, backing vocals
- Alexander Svenningson – drums
- Marcus Wesslén – bass guitar

== Charts ==
Chart (2014)	Peak position
Swedish Albums (Sverigetopplistan)	5
