= The Secrets of Love =

Book by Rosie Rushton

- Book's cover
- Author: Rosie Rushton
- Cover artist: Susan Hellard
- Language: English
- Series: 21st century Austen
- Genre: Young adult literature
- Publisher: Piccadilly Press
- Publication date: February 25, 2005
- Publication place: Great Britain
- Media type: Book
- Pages: 176
- ISBN: 978-1-85340-774-1
- Followed by: Summer of Secrets

The Secrets of Love is an homage to Jane Austen's 1811 novel Sense and Sensibility, written by Rosie Rushton and published by Piccadilly Press as a children's book in 2005.

== Plot summary ==
The Dashwood sisters, Ellie, Abby and Georgie go to London to visit their father, Max Dashwood, who is divorced to their mother. After spending the day in the dungeons, they go to father’s new flat, where he lives with Pandora, his new wife. They meet Blake Goodman – Pandora’s nephew. Georgie gets a birthday present and the girls come back to Brighton. Abby goes to the XS club, but she tells everyone she's going to the hospital because her boyfriend had an accident. Her mother discovers it and won't let Abby go out with friends for a month.

Few days later, Blake calls Ellie and tells her that Max is in the hospital. Ellie, Abby and their mother, Julia, go to London to visit Mr. Dashwood. Unfortunately, he dies and Abby blames Pandora of killing her dad. Pandora blames Julia, but ladies explain everything and talk about funeral details.

Georgie comes back home (she was at the zorbing session, which was present from Tom) and she’s really upset. Few days later Max’s lawyer comes to Holly House and tells Julia that she and her daughters have to move out, because the house is Pandora’s property. Davina, Julia's mother, arrives to Holly House and tells her daughter that, they can move to Norfolk to her grandma's house.

Abby discovers that, in Norfolk there are no clubs, discos and cinemas. She meets a girl called Chloe at school and they become friends. Chloe brings Abby for a concert of a local group and they meet Nick Mayes, who falls in love with Abby. Unfortunately, Chloe has a crush on Nick so Abby doesn't want to hurt her feelings by going out with him, even though she likes Nick.

One day, Abby meets Hunter Meade-Holman - son of local politician. She falls in love with him and they become a couple after few days. Nick doesn't want to look at Abby kissing Hunter and tells her about it. She doesn't care about him. Once, Hunter takes Abby out and offers to go to his house. He wants to have sex with her, but Abby doesn't agree. Hunter breaks up with her and Abby comes back home on foot. Luckily, Nick finds her and she tells him about everything.

Ellie's private life is complicated, too. Blake's got a girlfriend, Lucy, whose grandma is ill and he can't break up with her. But he doesn't see any problems with kissing Ellie, who doesn't like his games. Ellie doesn't want to hear Blake's explanations, but Davina makes things worse - she wants Ellie to meet Lucy.

Georgie has a new friend - Adam. He seems to have a crush on Georgie. They are working together on a party - they're waiters. Before starting their work, Adam talks with Georgie. Georgie suspects that Adam is ill but then he kisses her and she forgets to ask him.

Ellie works at the bar. She overhears Blake talk to Piers, his friend. She treats Blake very frostily when he comes to the bar.

Hunter comes back for a party and he brings his new girlfriend, Fiona, with him. Abby sees it and tells Fiona that she's Hunter's girlfriend. She's very angry and she hits Fiona with her bag and runs away to the parking lot. She's got Nick's keys and she decides to get into the car and go home. Abby can't handle driving a car. Suddenly, she becomes unconscious. Her family and Nick go to the hospital. Next day, Abby talks to Nick, who tells her about his feelings and kisses her. Abby talks to Chloe, who has a boyfriend now - Ryan.

Abby goes out with Nick. She can't walk, so the boy brings a wheel chair for her. They go to the harbour and they see Georgie and Tom, who came to Norfolk to visit his friend. Georgie tells her sister that she and Tom are together. Ellie talks to Blake, who came back from Hong Kong (he was going to go to Australia with Lucy, but he came back). He kisses her and tells Ellie that he loves her. Then, he shows her portrait of Dashwood family: Max, Julia, Ellie, Abby and Georgie and offers her to come to Holly House.

== Characters ==
- Elinor "Ellie" Dashwood - the eldest daughter of Max and Julia Dashwood. She's 17 years old. She's practical and shy. She's in love with Blake Goodman and wants to study law.
- Abigail "Abby" Dashwood - She's 16 years old. She's a wannabe actress. She's Ellie's and Georgie's sister and is in love with Nick but she can't go out with him because her best friend, Chloe, has a crush on him.
- Georgina "Georgie" Dashwood - She's 13 and the youngest sister of Ellie and Abby. She's a tomboy. Her best friend is Tom, but Adam has a crush on her. Adam kisses her.
- Julia Dashwood - Ellie's, Abby's and Georgie's mother. She's divorced and now lives with her daughters in Norfolk.
- Maximilian Dashwood - Ellie's, Abby's and Georgie's father. Julia's ex-husband. He married Pandora, but he died of a heart attack.
- Pandora Dashwood - Max's new wife. She lives in Holly House now.
- Davina Stretton - Julia's mother.
- Blake Goodman - Pandora's nephew. He's in love with Ellie. He wants to be an artist.
- Nick Mayes - Abby's boyfriend.
- Adam - Georgie's new friend. He's in love with her.
- Tom Eastment – Georgie’s friend from Brighton.
- Hunter Meade-Holman - politician's son. He wanted Abby to have sex with him, but she didn't agree.
- Piers Frondyce - Blake's friend. He's Lucy's new boyfriend.
- Lucy - Blake's ex-girlfriend.
- Fiona - Hunter's new girlfriend.
- Mrs. Eastment -Tom's mum.
- Chloe - Abby's new friend. She's Ryan's girlfriend.
- Ryan - Chloe's boyfriend.
- Samantha Carter - Chloe and Abby's friend.
- Eveline Passmore - principal of Dashwood sisters' old school.
- Fergus Mortimer - a boy, who invited Abby to XS club.
- Melissa Peck - a girl, who was Abby's rival (she wanted to be Fergus' girlfriend).
- Phoebe - Abby's friend from Brighton.
