= Nervous Breakdown =

Nervous breakdown is a term for a mental disorder with no agreed-upon medical definition.

Nervous Breakdown may refer to:

== Music ==
- Nervous Breakdown (album), by Fu-Schnickens, 1994
- Nervous Breakdown (EP), by Black Flag, 1979
- "Nervous Breakdown", a song by Carleen Anderson from True Spirit, 1994
- "Nervous Breakdown", a song by Eddie Cochran, 1958
- "Nervous Breakdown", a song by Hawthorne Heights from Skeletons, 2010
- "Nervous Breakdown", a song by Van Morrison from What's It Gonna Take?, 2022

== Other uses ==
- "A Nervous Breakdown", an 1889 short story by Anton Chekhov
- The Nervous Breakdown (magazine)
