= Point Break Live! =

2003 reality play inspired & parody of 1991 film

- Written by: Jaime Keeling
- Characters: Johnny Utah; Bodhi; Pappas; Tyler
- Original language: English
- Subject: Point Break
- Genre: Comedy, parody

Premiere
- Date premiered: 2003
- Place premiered: Little Theatre, Northwest Film Forum; Seattle, Washington

Point Break Live! is a parody by Jaime Keeling of the 1991 Keanu Reeves, Patrick Swayze action crime movie Point Break.

Sometimes credited as the first-ever "reality-play", each performance features a new, unrehearsed actor in the protagonist role of Johnny Utah, reading their lines from cue-cards delivered by a production assistant.

== How it works ==
At the start of the show, audience members who wish to play Johnny Utah are called on stage and put through a quick faux-audition. The winner is then selected by audience Applause-o-meter. A cue card assistant (cast member) leads Utah around the stage throughout the play and shows him or her the lines on laminated cards. Some have said that the winner is frequently a "ringer," because the person chosen is often a good actor and always fits into the wetsuit. The play is an over-the-top, action-packed comedy.

== History ==
The play premiered in a sold-out 2-month run co-directed by Jaime Keeling and Jamie Hook at Seattle's Northwest Film Forum and has since toured throughout the country, including extended runs at the Bryant-Lake Bowl in Minneapolis and Galapagos Art Space in Brooklyn, New York.

The show played at the La Tea Theater in Manhattan. It previously played at Charlie O's Lounge in the Hotel Alexandria in downtown Los Angeles, where much of the movie took place, and premiered on October 1, 2008, at the V Theater at the Miracle Mile Shops in Las Vegas.

Producer-Director Eve Hars brought the show to Chicago's New Rock Theater, where it ran from March to October 2010, and reopened for a short spring run in 2011. The show's longest run to date is in LA/Hollywood, where it opened in 2007 and closed June 25, 2016. Hars stopped paying Keeling while she continued to produce the show, on the grounds that Keeling created the show without permission from the creators of the original film so the play was not entitled to copyright protection. Keeling sued Hars, and in 2015 the Second US Circuit Court of Appeals ruled in favor of Keeling, finding sufficient originality in Keeling's play for it to be transformative use and entitled to copyright protection.

== Productions ==
Point Break Live! was performed at:

- The Dragonfly in Hollywood
- The Theatre Guild of Ancon (Community Theatre in English) in Panama City, Panama - June 20 – 29, 2013
- The Alley Theater in Louisville, Kentucky.

The San Francisco production ran sequentially across 4 venues between April 11, 2008, and June 3, 2016. All but 2 of its performances sold out. During this period, the show closed out its first venue (The Xenodrome) and third venue (The Metreon) due to impending reconstruction projects. The final night was almost cancelled due to a bomb threat at the theater.

== Cast ==
- Notable figures who have played Johnny Utah in the production include Lori Petty (who played Utah's girlfriend Tyler Endicott in the movie), Justin Pierre from the band Motion City Soundtrack, Juli Crockett, Andre Ethier (outfielder for the LA Dodgers), and stand-up comedian Jake Weisman.
- Gary Busey made a special appearance on stage at the Dragonfly production.
- Patrick O'Sullivan from the ABC sitcom "The Neighbors" played Angelo Pappas/Gary Busey in the show from 2011 to 2013.
- Other celebrity attendees include Kirsten Dunst and Justin Long, writer Peter Iliff, and director Kathryn Bigelow.

== Awards ==
- Mayor Gavin Newsom declared April 11, 2008 "Point Break Live! Day" in San Francisco.
- Point Break Live! hit the #1 spot on E! Daily 10 in 2008.
- ABC News Nightline aired a segment about Point Break Live! in 2009.
- WGN aired a segment of Chicago's Best with Brittney Payton, daughter of Walter Payton interviewing the cast
