= Worlds Collide (Dead by April album) =

Studio album by Dead by April
- Released: 7 April 2017
- Recorded: May 2015 – August 2016
- Studio: Studio PH Sweden, Gothenburg, Sweden
- Genre: Pop metal; metalcore; post-hardcore
- Length: 41:45
- Label: Universal, Spinefarm
- Producer: Pontus Hjelm

Dead by April chronology
Let the World Know (2014)	Worlds Collide (2017)	The Affliction (2024)

Singles from Worlds Collide
- 1. "Breaking Point" Released: 2 December 2016; 2. "My Heart Is Crushable" Released: 27 January 2017; 3. "Warrior" Released: 3 March 2017

Worlds Collide is the fourth studio album by Swedish metalcore band Dead by April. It was released on 7 April 2017 through Spinefarm and Universal. It is the first album to feature guitarist/songwriter Pontus Hjelm on co-lead vocals and the last album to feature former unclean vocalist Christoffer "Stoffe" Andersson as he left the band shortly after the album's release. The album debuted at number 8 on the Swedish albums chart. On 1 September 2017 the band released an EP titled Worlds Collide (Jimmie Strimell Sessions), which contains four tracks from Worlds Collide with the original harsh vocals replaced with harsh vocals by returning member Jimmie Strimell. On 20 October another EP, called Worlds Collide (Acoustic Sessions), was released, containing acoustic versions of 4 songs from the album.

== Track listing ==
All tracks are written by Pontus Hjelm, Christos Dell. (tracks 1,6,10)

No.	Title	Length
1.	"Crying Over You"	4:25
2.	"I Can't Breathe"	4:02
3.	"Playing with Fire"	3:56
4.	"Warrior"	3:02
5.	"Breaking Point"	3:49
6.	"My Heart Is Crushable"	3:15
7.	"Can You See the Red"	3:41
8.	"Our Worlds Collide"	3:56
9.	"This Is My Life"	4:09
10.	"Perfect the Way You Are"	3:45
11.	"For Every Step" (featuring Tommy Körberg)	3:53
Total length:		41:45

Worlds Collide (Jimmie Strimell Sessions)
No.	Title	Length
1.	"Crying Over You" (featuring Jimmie Strimell)	4:25
2.	"Warrior" (featuring Jimmie Strimell)	3:02
3.	"This Is My Life" (featuring Jimmie Strimell)	4:09
4.	"Playing with Fire" (featuring Jimmie Strimell)	3:56
Total length:		15:32

Worlds Collide (Acoustic Sessions)
No.	Title	Length
1.	"Breaking Point" (acoustic)	3:41
2.	"For Every Step" (acoustic)	3:30
3.	"Perfect the Way You Are" (acoustic)	3:37
4.	"Our Worlds Collide" (acoustic)	3:15
Total length:		14:03

== Personnel ==
Credits are adapted from the album's liner notes.

Dead by April

- Pontus Hjelm – guitars, clean vocals (except track 9 and 11), additional choirs (track 11), keyboards
- Marcus Rosell – drums
- Christoffer Andersson – harsh vocals (except for track 10, 11 and Jimmie Strimell Sessions and Acoustic Sessions)
- Marcus Wesslén – bass, additional choirs (track 11)

Additional musicians

- Jimmie Strimell - harsh vocals (Jimmie Strimell Sessions only)
- Tommy Körberg – lead vocals (track 11)
- Nils-Petter Nilsson – additional choirs (tracks 1, 6 and 8)
- Christopher Kristensen – additional choirs (tracks 1, 6 and 8)
- Andréa C-a – additional choirs (tracks 1, 6 and 8)
- Beda Odlöw Nyberg – children choir (tracks 1, 6 and 8)
- Bella Holmudden – children choir (tracks 1, 6 and 8)
- Embla Johansson – children choir (tracks 1, 6 and 8)
- Fina Juslin – children choir (tracks 1, 6 and 8)
- Julia Lindgren – children choir (tracks 1, 6 and 8)
- My Wegnelius Jarlstedt – children choir (tracks 1, 6 and 8)
- Nelly Jamarani – children choir (tracks 1, 6 and 8)
- Rebecca Tuite – children choir (tracks 1, 6 and 8)
- Tora Kopp – children choir (tracks 1, 6 and 8)
- Viktor Werlenius – children choir (tracks 1, 6 and 8)
- Zelda Ekelun – children choir (tracks 1, 6 and 8)

Production

- Pontus Hjelm – producer, recording, engineering
- Christian Silver – drum recording, engineering (drums)
- Olof Berggren – drum recording, drum engineering (drums)
- Ben Grosse – mixing
- Paul Pavao – mixing
- Henke – mastering

== Charts ==
Chart (2017)	Peak position
Swedish Albums (Sverigetopplistan)	8
