= Jimmie Strimell =

Swedish singer (born 1980)

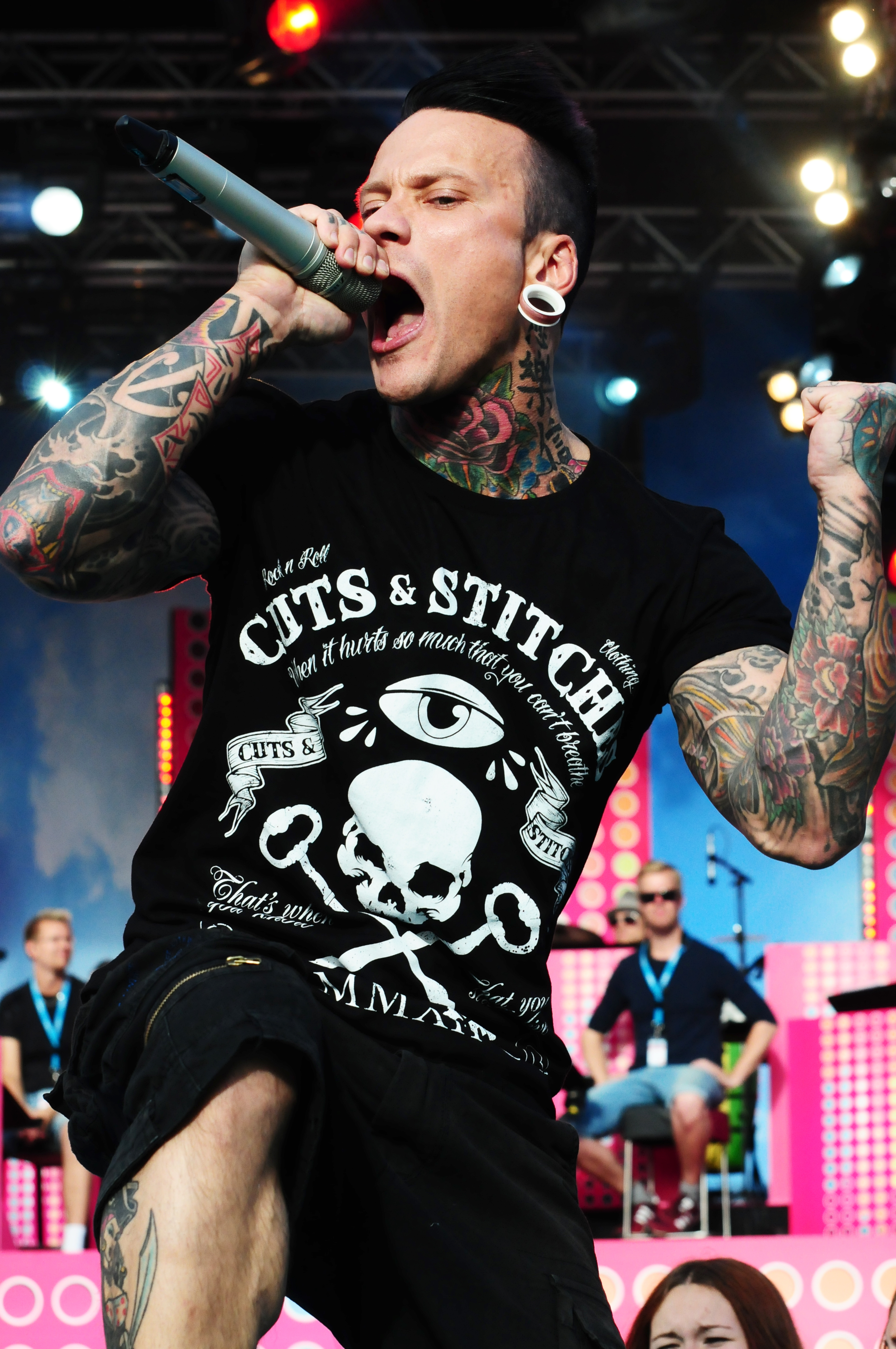
- Strimell in 2012

Background information
- Born: 3 December 1980 (age 45)
- Genre: Melodic death metal, metalcore, electronicore, post-hardcore, death metal, deathcore, groove metal, djent
- Occupations: Singer, songwriter
- Years active: 2005–2019
- Member of: Vindicta
- Formerly of: Dead by April, Nightrage, Ends With a Bullet, My Collapse, The End of Grace

Jimmie Strimell (born 3 December 1980) is a Swedish death metal singer. Strimell is known for being a founding member, vocalist and songwriter of metal band Dead by April, as well as serving as frontman for Nightrage.

== Career ==
In 2006, Strimell founded Dead by April with Pontus Hjelm, where he would serve as the band's vocalist and as a songwriter. Strimell became known for his growls, which were inspired by Pantera. Strimell's vocals caught the attention of other metal acts. After the departure of Tomas Lindberg, Greek-Swedish metal group Nightrage recruited Strimell to sing vocals on their 2007 album, A New Disease is Born. In 2009, Strimell joined Swedish metal supergroup, Death Destruction.

=== Dead by April ===
Dead by April released their first eponymous album, Dead by April in May 2009. The group released their follow up, Incomparable, in September 2011. Concurrently, Strimell toured and released and album with Death Destruction. In February 2012, Dead by April performed at Melodifestivalen, where they were named finalists in the competition to represent Sweden at the 2012 Eurovision Song Contest. Later that year, Strimell left Death Destruction to focus on Dead by April full time.

=== Departure ===
In March 2013, Strimell left Dead by April due to personal reasons. At the time, his bandmates released an open letter to their fans thanking Strimell for his contributions to the band, but citing Strimell's personal issues had created a "bad environment" that they could not continue with him. After leaving the band, Strimell was announced as returning to join Nightrage's Japanese tour, but ultimately did not appear due to "unforeseen circumstances". Strimell would later join the Swedish hard rock band, Ends With a Bullet. In October 2013, the band released their first album.

In 2015, Strimell was falsely announced as the new frontman of Asking Alexandria when he was impersonated on Twitter. At the time, Strimell was in the band My Collapse.

=== Return to April ===
In April 2017, Strimell rejoined Dead by April as a vocalist. At the time, Strimell claimed he had overcome his addiction issues. In March 2020, Strimell was released from the band for a second time due to his ongoing drug and alcohol addiction. After being released from Dead by April for the second time, Strimell formed a new band, Vindicta. Vindicta released their first single called "Slice It" on 1 October 2021.

On 30 June 2023 Strimell rejoined Nightrage after their long time vocalist Ronnie Nyman left the band, but left shortly after joining due to "personal problems".

== Discography ==
with Nightrage

- 2007 — A New Disease Is Born

with Dead by April

- 2009 — Dead by April
- 2011 — Incomparable
- 2017 — Worlds Collide (Jimmie Strimell Sessions)
- 2019 — As A Butterfly (Re-recorded)
- 2019 — Hold On (Re-recorded)
- 2019 — Beautiful Nightmare (Re-recorded)
- 2019 — Empathy (Re-recorded)

with Death Destruction

- 2011 — Death Destruction
- 2011 — Fuck Yeah (Live EP)

with Ends With a Bullet

- 2013 — Ends With a Bullet (EP)

with My Collapse

- 2015 — Ghosts (Single)

with Splittrad

- 2018 — Djofull (Single)
- 2018 — Jörmungandr (Single)

with Jay Ray

- 2021 — Cold Light (Music video)
- 2022 — Cold Light (Single)

with Vindicta

- 2021 — Slice It (Single)
- 2023 — Vindicta (EP)
