= Gary Busey filmography =

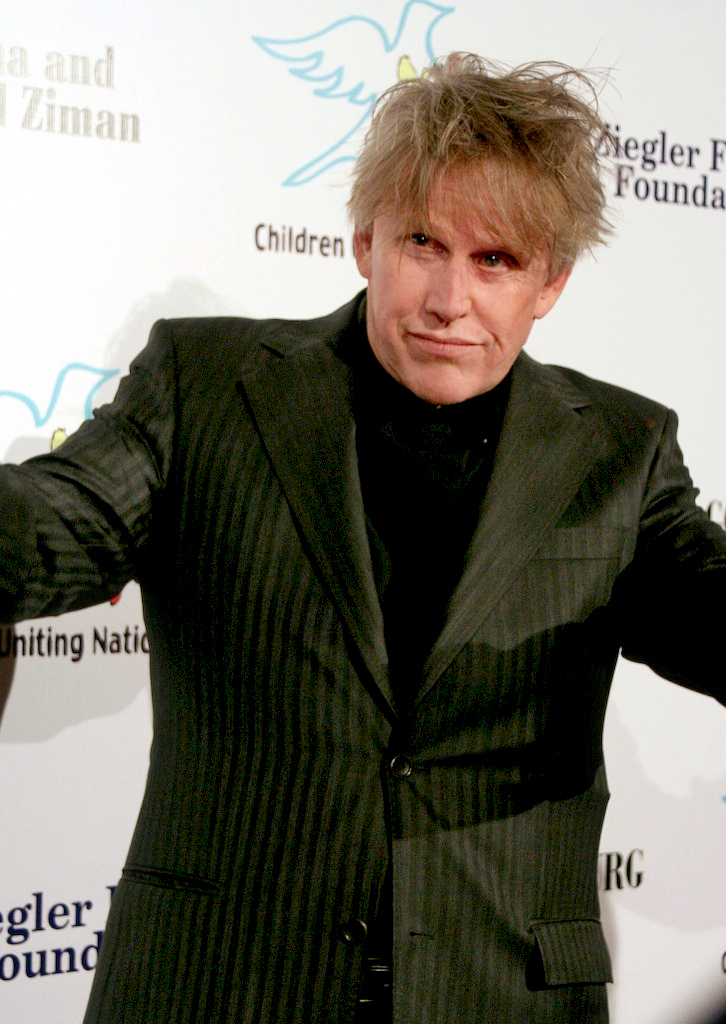
Busey at the Oscar Party in 2008

The following is the filmography of American actor Gary Busey.

== Film ==
Year	Title	Role	Notes	Ref(s)
1967	The Love-Ins	Hippie with Loudspeaker	Uncredited	
1968	Wild in the Streets	Concert Attendee	Uncredited	
1970	Didn't You Hear?	James		
1971	Angels Hard as They Come	Henry		
1972	The Magnificent Seven Ride!	Hank Allen		
1972	Dirty Little Billy	Basil Crabtree		
1973	Lolly-Madonna XXX	Zeb		
1973	The Last American Hero	Wayne Jackson		
1973	Hex	Giblets		
1974	Thunderbolt and Lightfoot	Curly	Credited as Garey Busey	
1974	You and Me	Himself		
1976	The Gumball Rally	Gibson – Camaro Team		
1976	A Star Is Born	Bobby Ritchie		
1978	Straight Time	Willy Darrin		
1978	The Buddy Holly Story	Buddy		
1978	Big Wednesday	Leroy Smith		
1980	Carny	Frankie		
1980	Foolin' Around	Wes		
1982	Barbarosa	Karl Westover		
1983	D.C. Cab	Dell		
1984	The Bear	Paul W. Bryant		
1985	Insignificance	The Ballplayer		
1985	Silver Bullet	Uncle Red		
1986	Let's Get Harry	Jack		
1986	Eye of the Tiger	Buck Matthews		
1987	Lethal Weapon	Mr. Joshua		
1987	Bulletproof	Frank McBain		
1988	Act of Piracy	Ted Andrews		
1989	Hider in the House	Tom Sykes		
1990	Predator 2	Peter Keyes		
1991	My Heroes Have Always Been Cowboys	Clint		
1991	Point Break	Angelo Pappas		
1992	The Player	Gary Busey		
1992	Canvas	Ozzy Decker		
1992	Under Siege	Commander Peter Krill		
1993	The Firm	Eddie Lomax		
1993	Rookie of the Year	Chet Steadman		
1993	South Beach	Lenny		
1994	Breaking Point	Dwight Meadows	also known as Double Suspicion	
1994	Surviving the Game	Doc Hawkins		
1994	Chasers	Sergeant Vince Banger		
1994	Warriors	Frank		
1994	Drop Zone	Ty Alan Moncrief		
1995	Man with a Gun	Jack Rushton	also known as Gun for Hire	
1996	Livers Ain't Cheap	Foreman	also known as The Real Thing	
1996	Carried Away	Nathan / Major		
1996	Black Sheep	Drake Sabitch		
1996	The Chain	Frank Morrisey		
1996	Sticks & Stones	Book's Dad		
1996	Lethal Tender	Mr. Turner		
1996	One Clean Move	Connie	Short film	
1997	Lost Highway	Bill Dayton		
1997	Plato's Run	Plato		
1997	Steel Sharks	Cmdr. Bill McKay		
1997	The Rage	Art Dacy		
1997	Diary of a Serial Killer, also known as "Rough Draft".	Nelson Keece	Murder & intrigue, something different	
1997	Suspicious Minds	Vic Mulvey		
1998	Rough Draft	Nelson Keece	also known as Diary of a Serial Killer	
1998	Fear and Loathing in Las Vegas	Highway Patrolman		
1998	Detour	Mo Ginsburg		
1998	Soldier	Church		
1999	Two Shades of Blue	Jack Reynolds		
1999	Jacob Two Two Meets the Hooded Fang	The Hooded Fang		
1999	No Tomorrow	Noah		
2000	Apocalypse III: Tribulation	Tom Canboro		
2000	Hot Boyz	Tully		
2000	Down 'n Dirty	D. A. Mickey Casey		
2000	G-Men from Hell	Lt. Langdon		
2001	A Crack in the Floor	Tyler Trout		
2002	Frost: Portrait of a Vampire	Micah		
2002	Slap Shot 2: Breaking the Ice	Richmond Claremont		
2002	Sam & Janet	Bartender		
2002	Glory Glory	Sheriff Ben Tyler	also known as Hooded Angels	
2002	On the Edge	Felix		
2003	Quigley	Archie Channing	also known as Daddy Dog Day	
2003	Welcome 2 Ibiza	Cortez		
2003	Ghost Rock	Jack Pickett		
2003	Scorched	Zeek		
2003	The Shadowlands	Supreme Regent Onticree		
2003	The Prize Fighter	Whitey Ferguson		
2004	Motocross Kids	Viper		
2004	Fallacy			
2004	If Love Hadn't Left Me Lonely	Mesdeg		
2004	Latin Dragon	Thorn		
2004	El Padrino	Lars		
2004	Border Blues	LAPD medium Michael March		
2004	Double Dare	Self	Uncredited	
2005	Shade of Pale	Billings		
2005	Buckaroo: The Movie	Dr. Brawn		
2005	Chasing Ghosts	Marcos Alfiri		
2005	A Sight for Sore Eyes	Earl Cooper	Short film	
2005	The Gingerdead Man	Millard Findlemeyer		
2005	Souled Out	Gabriel (The Angel)		
2005	Overachievers	Blind Master	also known as The Hand Job	
2005	No Rules	Leroy Little		
2006	Cloud 9	Gary Busey		
2006	Descansos	The Keeper		
2006	Valley of the Wolves: Iraq	Doctor		
2006	Dr. Dolittle 3	Butch	Voice role	
2006	Shut Up and Shoot!	Bob Katz		
2006	Crooked	John Rouse	also known as Soft Target	
2006	The Hard Easy	Vinnie		
2006	Buy the Ticket, Take the Ride: Hunter S. Thompson on Film	Self		
2007	Succubus: Hell-Bent	Sentinel		
2007	Lady Samurai	Chief Downs		
2007	Homo Erectus	Krutz		
2007	Blizhniy Boy: The Ultimate Fighter	Wizard		
2007	Chasing the Dream	Narrator		
2008	Beyond the Ring	Tony De Luca		
2009	Hallettsville	Sheriff David Ketchum		
2010	Freaky Saturday Night Fever	Boyie	Short film	
2010	Down and Distance	Bo Vonarb		
2011	Jenny	Gary	Short film	
2011	Guido	Steve Kaufman		
2012	Piranha 3DD	Clayton		
2012	Lizzie	Andrew Borden		
2012	Change of Heart	Movie Star	Short film	
2013	Matt's Chance	Bill		
2013	Bounty Killer	Van Sterling		
2014	Confessions of a Womanizer	Gary		
2014	Behaving Badly	Chief Howard D. Lansing		
2015	Entourage	Gary Busey		
2015	Mansion of Blood	Zacharia		
2015	Bikini Model Academy	Uncle Seymour		
2016	Candiland	Arnie / God		
2016	Mamaboy	Coach Dombrowski		
2016	DaZe: Vol. Too (sic) - NonSeNse	Mr. Morris		
2018	Camp Manna	Jack Cujo Parrish		
2019	Bunker of Blood: Chapter 8: Butcher's Bake Off: Hell's Kitchen	Millard Findlemeyer		
2024	Holy Cash	Pediatrician		
2025	Trick and Treats	Pastor Joseph		

== Television ==
Year	Title	Role	Notes	Ref(s)
1970	The High Chaparral	Rafe	Episode: "The Badge"	
1971	Dan August	Hippie #2	Episode: "The Manufactured Man"	
1971	The Uncanny Film Festival and Camp Meeting	Teddy Jack Eddy		
1972	Bonanza	Henry Johnson	Episode: "The Hidden Enemy"	
1973	Kung Fu	Josh	Episode: "The Ancient Warrior"	
1973	Blood Sport	David Lee Birdsong	Television film	
1974	The Execution of Private Slovik	Jimmy Feedek	Television film	
1974	The Law	William Bright	Television film	
1974–1975	The Texas Wheelers	Truckie Wheeler	8 episodes	
1975	Gunsmoke	Harve Daley	Episode: "The Busters"	
1975	Baretta	Puckett	Episode: "On the Road"	
1985	The Hitchhiker	Rev. Nolan Powers	Episode: "W.G.O.D."	
1986	Half a Lifetime	Bart	Television film	
1988	A Dangerous Life	Tony O'Neil	Television film	
1989	The Neon Empire	Frank Weston	Television film	
1991	Wild Texas Wind	Justice Hayden Parker	Television film	
1992	Chrome Soldiers	Jim 'Flash' Gordon	Television film	
1993	Fallen Angels	Buzz' Meeks	Episode: "Since I Don't Have You"	
1997	Hawaii Five-O	Jimmy Xavier Berk	Television film (never aired)	
1997	Rough Riders	Gen. Joseph Wheeler	Miniseries	
1998	Universal Soldier II: Brothers in Arms	Otto Mazur	Television film	
1998	The Girl Next Door	Sheriff Larson	Television film	
1999	Walker, Texas Ranger	Donovan Riggs	Episode: "Special Witness"	
1999	Shasta McNasty	Jack	Episode: "The Thanksgiving Show"	
2000	Best Actress	Gary Busey	Television film	
2000	The Outer Limits	Ezra Burnham	Episode: "Revival"	
2000	The Huntress	Tmomy Van Slyke	Episode: "What Ralph Left Behind"	
2001	Law & Order	Tommy Vega	Episode: "Formerly Famous"	
2001	King of the Hill	Mad Dog	Voice role, episode: "Soldier of Misfortune"	
2003	Russians in the City of Angels	March	3 episodes	
2003	I'm with Busey	Self	13 episodes	
2004	Penn & Teller: Bullshit!	Himself	Episode: "12 Stepping"	
2004–2007	Entourage	Himself	3 episodes	
2005	The Simpsons	Gary Busey	Voice role, episode: "On a Clear Day I Can't See My Sister"	
2005	Into the West	Johnny Fox	Episode: "Wheel to the Stars"	
2005	Yesenin	Zinger	5 episodes	
2005	Celebrity Fit Club	Himself	8 episodes	
2006	Scrubs	Gary Busey	2 Episodes	
2006	Tom Goes to the Mayor	Coach Red Harris	Voice role, episode: "Wrestling"	
2006	Celebrity Paranormal Project	Himself	9 episodes	
2007	Maneater	Grady Barnes	Television film	
2008	The Cho Show	Himself	Episode: "Off the Grid"	
2008	Celebrity Rehab with Dr. Drew	Himself	9 episodes	
2008–2012	World's Dumbest...	Himself	23 episodes	
2009	Nite Tales: The Series	Army Man	Episode: "Trapped"	
2011	The Apprentice	Himself	24 episodes	
2011	Two and a Half Men	Gary Busey	Episode: "Frodo's Headshots"	
2012	Celebrity Wife Swap	Himself	1 episode	
2012–2013	Mr. Box Office	John Anderson	4 episodes	
2014	American Dad!	Gary Busey	Voice role, episode: "She Swill Survive"	
2014	Celebrity Big Brother	Himself	26 episodes	
2015	Dancing with the Stars	Himself	6 episodes	
2015	From Dusk till Dawn: The Series	The Prospector	Episode: "There Will Be Blood"	
2016	Sharknado: The 4th Awakens	Wilford	Television film	
2016	The Mr. Peabody & Sherman Show	Alternate Universe Peabody	Voice role, episode: "The Wrath of Hughes"	
2017–2018	Impractical Jokers	Himself	3 episodes	
2018	The Last Sharknado: It's About Time	Wilford Wexler	Television film	
2020	Gary Busey: Pet Judge	Himself	6 episodes	
2021	Shameless	Frank Gallagher's Father	Episode: Hall of Shame - Frank: Ghosts of Gallagher Past	

== Video games ==
Year	Title	Role	Notes	Ref(s)
2002	Grand Theft Auto: Vice City	Phil Cassidy	Voice role	
2006	Grand Theft Auto: Vice City Stories	Phil Cassidy	Voice role	
2015	Killing Floor 2	Badass Santa	Voice role	
2016	Hitman	Himself	Voice role	
2021	Grand Theft Auto: The Trilogy - The Definitive Edition	Phil Cassidy	Voice role Archival recordings Remaster of Grand Theft Auto: Vice City only	
