= Dead by April (album) =

Studio album by Dead by April
- Released: 13 May 2009
- Recorded: 2007–2008
- Genre: Metalcore, melodic death metal, alternative metal
- Length: 47:48
- Language: English
- Label: Universal Music
- Producer: Henrik Edenhed

Dead by April chronology
Dead by April (2009)	Stronger (2011)

Singles from Dead by April
- 1. "Losing You" Released: 6 March 2009; 2. "What Can I Say" Released: 16 September 2009; 3. "Angels of Clarity" Released: 28 September 2009; 4. "Stronger" Released: 6 December 2010

Dead by April is the debut album from Swedish metal band Dead by April, released on 13 May 2009. It is the only album to feature former guitarist Johan Olsson.

The album entered the Swedish album charts at No. 2, with Relapse by Eminem at No. 3 and 21st Century Breakdown by Green Day at No. 1. The first single from the album was "Losing You", released on 6 March 2009. On 18 April the track listing, along with the album cover, was released.

The album mainly consists of re-recorded demo songs, except for two new tracks called "What Can I Say" and "Sorry for Everything". One of the two new tracks, "What Can I Say" was released as the second single from the album on 16 September, and "Angels of Clarity" became the third such release on 28 September. "What Can I Say" was released as a physical single only in Europe and "Angels of Clarity" as a digital download single only in the UK.

== Track listing ==
No.	Title	Writer(s)	Length
1.	"Trapped"	Pontus Hjelm	3:08
2.	"Angels of Clarity"	Hjelm, Jimmie Strimell	3:41
3.	"Losing You"	Hjelm, Strimell	3:57
4.	"What Can I Say"	Hjelm	3:08
5.	"Erased"	Hjelm, Strimell	3:26
6.	"Promise Me"	Hjelm, Christos Dell	3:34
7.	"Falling Behind"	Hjelm, Strimell	3:26
8.	"Sorry for Everything"	Hjelm	3:44
9.	"In My Arms"	Hjelm, Christos Dell	4:25
10.	"Stronger"	Hjelm, Strimell	4:00
11.	"Carry Me"	Hjelm, Strimell	3:48
12.	"A Promise"	Johan Eskilsson, Hjelm, Strimell	3:37
13.	"I Made It"	Hjelm, Strimell	3:49

Bonus tracks

No.	Title	Writer(s)	Length
14.	"Leaves Falling" (Limited edition and UK bonus track)	Hjelm	3:23
15.	"My Saviour" (UK bonus track)	Hjelm, Strimell	3:13
16.	"Losing You" (Alternate version - UK bonus track)	Hjelm, Strimell	3:30

Bonus DVD

- "Video Blog"
- "The Making Of"
- "Losing You" (Music Video)
- "Losing You" (Karaoke version)
- "Photo Slide" (Live photography)
- "Interview"

== Critical reception ==
Professional ratings
Review scores
Source	Rating
Allmusic	3.5/5 stars
Imperiumi	6/10 stars
Kerrang!	(4/5)
Ultimate-Guitar	9/10

"Fusing huge hooks, infectious melodies, stonking nu-metal styled riffage and electro samples, Dead by April surely know how to write songs... Sure, it won't leave your ears ringing, or fists bleeding, but it'll have you humming all the way home from the show," remarked Katie Parsons of Kerrang!, giving it a 4 out of 5 rating.

== Personnel ==
Dead by April

- Jimmie Strimell - lead vocals
- Pontus Hjelm - guitars, keyboards, programming, backing vocals, additional production
- Johan Olsson - guitars
- Marcus Wesslén - bass guitar
- Alexander Svenningson - drums

== Charts ==
=== Weekly charts ===
Chart (2009)	Peak position
Japanese Albums (Oricon)	163
Swedish Albums (Sverigetopplistan)	2

=== Year-end charts ===
Chart (2009)	Position
Swedish Albums (Sverigetopplistan)	39
