= Rosie Rushton =

British writer (born 1946)

- Born: 1946 (age 79–80) United Kingdom
- Occupation: Writer
- Subject: Fiction

Rosie Rushton (born 1946) is a British author who wrote several novels for teenagers.

Rushton is a researcher and music facilitator based in the West Midlands, where she has established herself as a specialist in music provision for individuals with learning disabilities.

Rushton began her career as a feature writer for the local paper. Staying Cool, Surviving School was her first book, published by Piccadilly Press in 1993. After writing another non-fiction title, You’re My Best Friend, I Hate You!, Rosie turned to fiction.

== Selected works ==
=== The Leehampton series ===
- Just Don't Make a Scene, Mum! (1995)
- I Think I'll Just Curl Up and Die! (1995)
- How Could You Do This To Me, Mum? (1996)
- Where Do We Go From Here?/Does Anyone Ever Listen? (1999)

=== The Girls ===
- Poppy (1996)
- Olivia (1997)
- Sophie (1998)
- Melissa (1998)
- Jessica (2000)

=== Best Friends ===
- Best Friends Together (1998)
- Best Friends Getting Sorted (1999)
- Best Friends in Love (1999)

=== What a Week ===
- What a Week Omnibus Books 1-3:
  - What a Week to Fall in Love (1998)
  - What a Week to Make it Big (1998)
  - What a Week to Break Free (1998)
- What a Week Omnibus Books 4-6:
  - What a Week to Make a Stand (1999)
  - What a Week to Play It Cool (1999)
  - What a Week to Make a Move (2001)
- What a Week to Take a Chance (2004)
- What a Week to Get Real (2005)
- What a Week to Risk it All (2006)

=== 21st century Austen ===
- The Secrets of Love (2005)
- Summer of Secrets (2007)
- Secret Schemes and Daring Dreams (2008)
- Love, Lies and Lizzie (2009)
- Echoes of Love (2010)
- Whatever Love Is (2012)

=== Other books ===
- Staying Cool, Surviving School (1993)
- You're My Best Friend - I Hate You! (1994)
- Fab 5: Don't Make a Scene, Mum (1999)
- Life Line (1999)
- PS He’s Mine (2000)
- Break Point (2001)
- Tell Me I’m OK, really (2001)
- Last Seen Wearing Trainers (2002)
- All Change! (2000)
- Fall Out! (2002)
- Waving Not Drowning (2003)
- Friends, Enemies and Other Tiny Problems (2004)
- The Dashwood Sisters’ Secrets of Love (2005)
- The Greatest Love Story Ever Told (2013, Kevin Mayhew). The gospel retold for teenagers.
