= Dead by April =

Swedish band

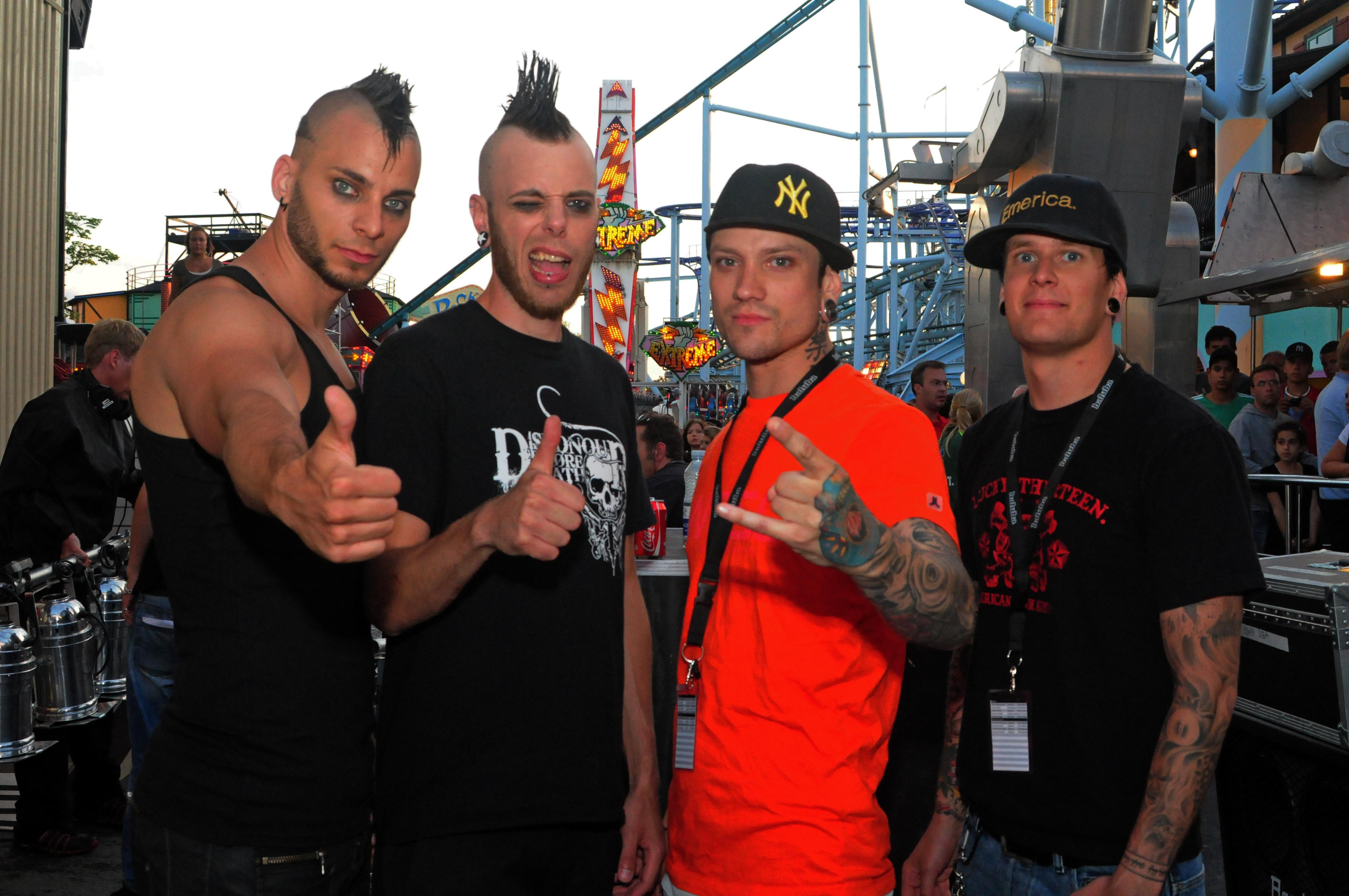
- Dead by April in 2009

Background information
- Origin: Gothenburg, Sweden
- Genres: Metalcore; electronicore; alternative metal; post-hardcore; pop metal
- Years active: 2007–present
- Labels: Universal; Spinefarm
- Members: Pontus Hjelm; Markus Wesslén; Christopher Kristensen; Richard Schill
- Past members: Johan Eskilsson; Henric Liljesand; Johan Olsson; Alexander Svenningsson; Zandro Santiago; Christoffer Andersson; Marcus Rossell; Jimmie Strimell
- Website: deadbyapril.com aprilarmy.world

Dead by April is a Swedish metalcore band from Gothenburg, formed in 2007 by Pontus Hjelm and Jimmie Strimell. The current band lineup consists of Pontus Hjelm (guitars/keyboards/clean vocals), Christopher Kristensen (unclean vocals), Markus Wesslén (bass/backing growled vocals) and Richard Schill (drums). Despite many line up changes throughout their career, both Markus Wesslén and Pontus Hjelm have remained consistent since their debut album.

== History ==
=== Early career and the self-titled album (2007–2010) ===
The band was formed in early 2007, when Jimmie Strimell, the lead vocalist of Nightrage, decided to collaborate with songwriter and former Cipher System member Pontus Hjelm to form Dead by April. During the band's early days in 2007 and 2008, the band did not release any physical media, though most of the songs that they gave to friends were quickly leaked out to several peer-to-peer-sites, with the first songs being "Lost" and "Stronger". During this time, they also played in local venues around Gothenburg.

On 27 March 2010, Dead by April headlined the Norwegian festival 'Rock mot Rus' together with several Norwegian acts such as Turdus Musicus, Moddi, Cyaneed, Jodski, Purified in Blood etc. The band continued touring with Purified in Blood until early May.

On 23 April 2010, it was announced on the band's official MySpace page that Pontus Hjelm had officially left Dead by April, to focus on songwriting. He stayed on as the main songwriter, telling the fans that "nothing is different in the songwriting department". The replacement for Hjelm became Zandro Santiago who only provided vocals as the band felt that it did not change much of the sound to continue with only one guitarist.

On 17 May 2010, the band released the fourth single of their debut album. Unlike any other Dead by April-single release, this single was a double A-Side entitled "Love Like Blood/Promise Me". Besides that, "Love Like Blood" is a Killing Joke cover; it marks the very first track recorded by Dead by April with their new singer, Zandro Santiago. "Promise Me", however, already appeared on the album.

On 22 October 2010, it was announced that Olsson would be leaving the band, citing "personal issues", as well as focusing on his clothing range. The band searched for a new guitarist via Facebook and YouTube. However, they later revealed on their Facebook page that Pontus would act as a "session" player on their upcoming album and whilst on tour.

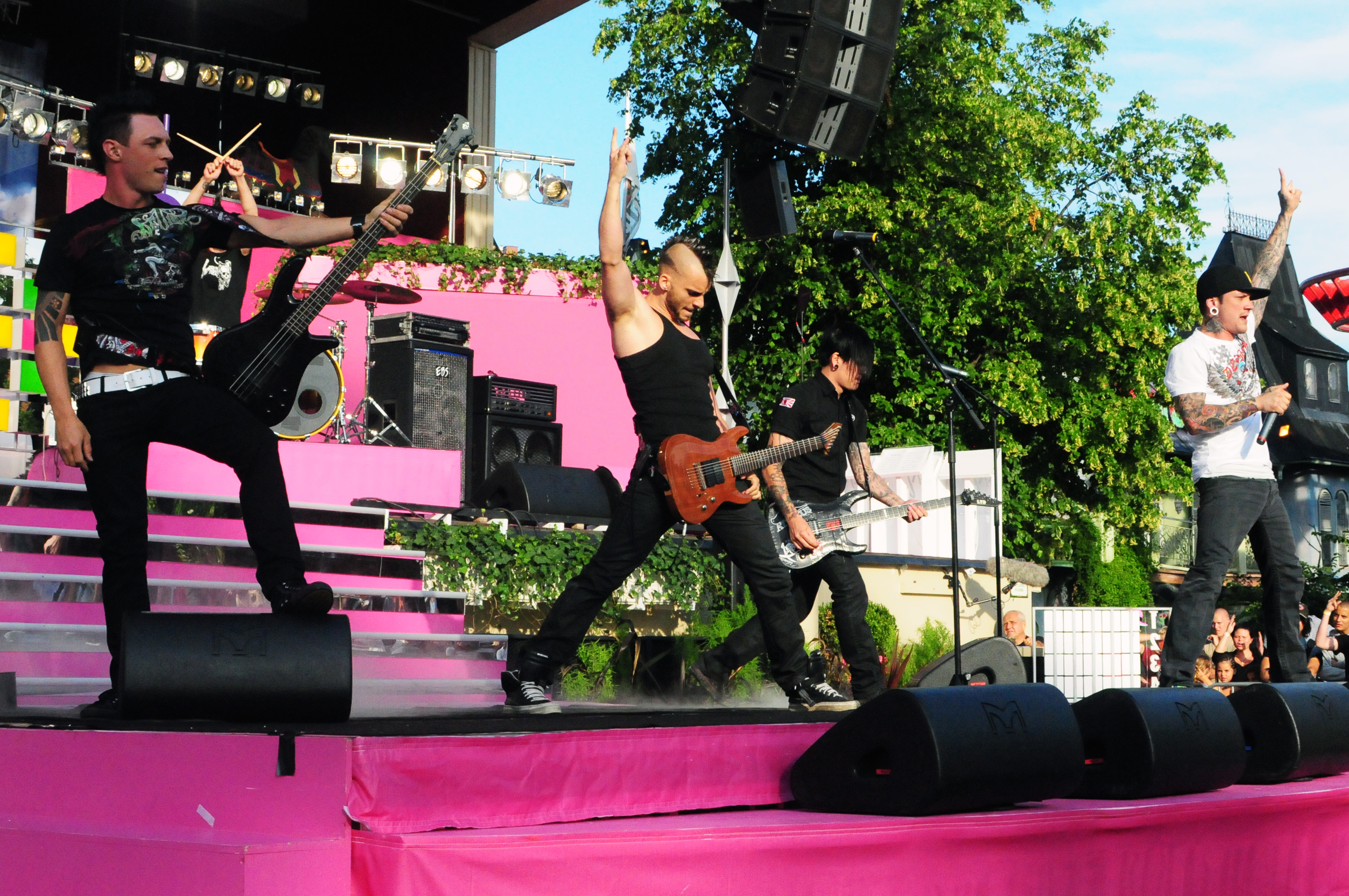
Dead by April performing in 2009

During Dead by April's UK tour with My Passion, Olsson was replaced by guitarist Joel Nilsson.

In August 2010, they released a teaser for a new song called "Within My Heart", which was released, along with the new album, in early 2011. The album is heavier and more dynamic than their self-titled album. The song "More Than Yesterday" has been played live on tour in the UK and Sweden and will feature on the new album, as well as the compilation album, "Stronger". Strimell released a demo recording of it on his YouTube channel.

Dead by April made an appearance on the soundtrack for Need for Speed: Hot Pursuit as a featured artist on the song "Stronger" by Lazee (not to be confused with their song with the same name).

On 7 December, it was announced that a new compilation album called Stronger would be released on 25 January 2011. It contains a demo version of "More Than Yesterday", three heavier versions of their songs and some tracks that have already been released.

During shows in Russia, DeathDestruction drummer Jonas Ekdahl, was replacing Svenningson while he is resting his ears. Ekdahl will remain as a session drummer for the coming 3 to 5 months.

=== Incomparable (2010–2012) ===
On 19 April 2011, Dead by April confirmed the mixing was complete for their newest album via their Facebook page. On 2 May 2011, Dead by April announced that their first single of their second album would be "Within My Heart". This was released digitally on 16 May 2011 and included two more songs - a new song called "Two Faced" and a re-recorded version of "Unhateable". Later, it was confirmed that the band would perform at the Sonisphere Festival in Sweden on 9 July.

Dead by April began mixing their new album in the second quarter of 2011 and concluded on 19 April 2011. On 4 July, the band announced the title of the new album to be Incomparable, and it was announced on 11 July that it would be released on 21 September, though it was rumored to be delayed in early August to a possible 7 November release date. The album cover was originally going to be released by the band on Facebook once they reached 230,000 "likes", but other sites leaked the cover so the band released it early. The cover features a sky blue background with the same "Dead by April" logo as their self-titled album. The center shows a Japanese girl with blood and a black substance coming out of her mouth, similar to scenes from The Grudge. The album is said to be heavier and more dynamic than their self-titled album. Zandro Santiago commented on the band's genre, stating that, "[Dead by April is a] metal and boyband pop. Metal fans might not handle it properly."

Similarly to the band's debut album, Incomparable debuted at number two on the national Swedish album charts, the band's homeland. The album was outsold only by Melissa Horn's Innan jag kände dig, which was in its second week of release and had already reached gold status in Sweden.

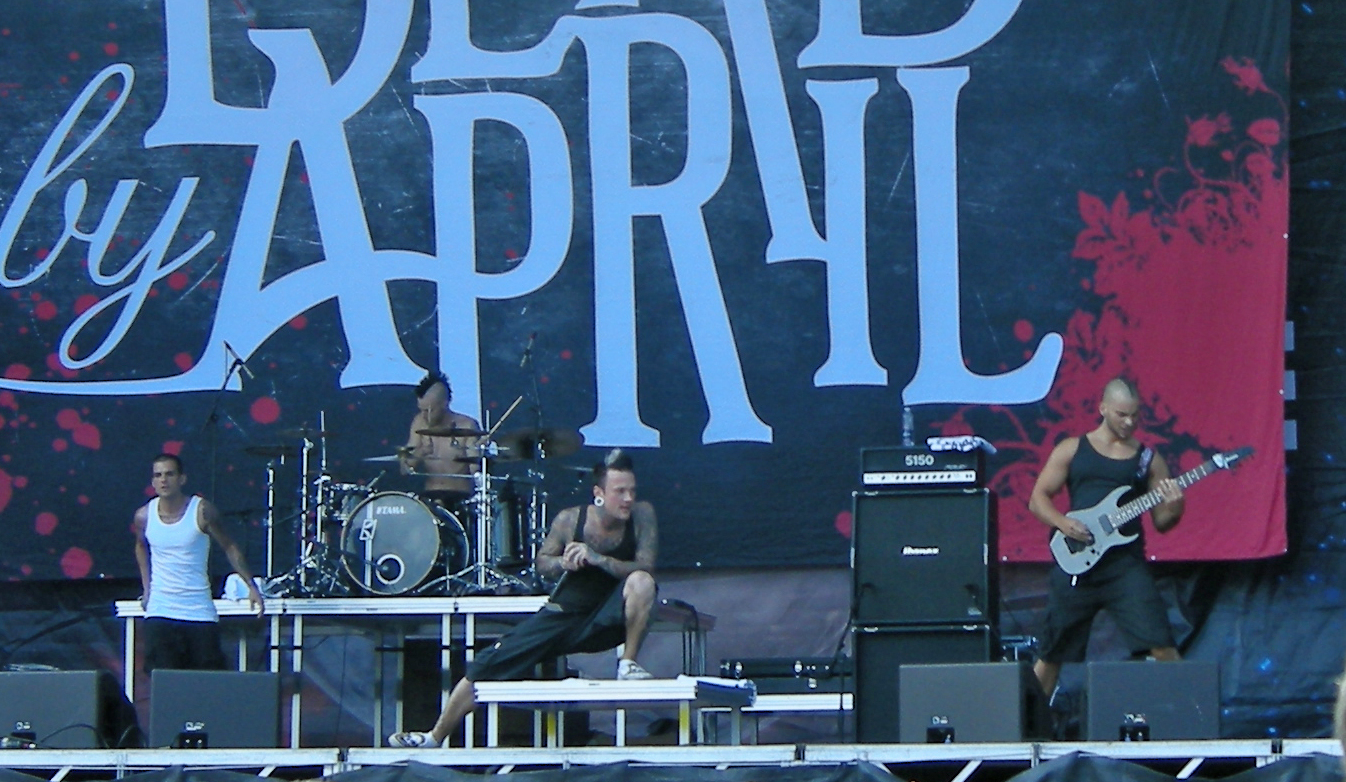
Dead by April at Sonisphere 2011

Dead by April performed in Melodifestivalen in early 2012 and went into the finals. The band placed 7th, using the song "Mystery". They have also announced that they are currently working on a new album, and that Pontus Hjelm had rejoined officially.

The band re-recorded an old demo song of theirs called "Found Myself in You" for pledgers on their PledgeMusic site. They have also announced that they will release a compilation album early next year. On 25 February 2013, Dead by April gained the number of pledges required for them to fund a live DVD release set for 13 March. Unfortunately, after much delay due to subsequent filming problems, the band later scrapped the release and refunded the funds.

On 18 March 2013, it was confirmed by the band that Strimell was no longer part of the band and had been replaced by Christoffer Andersson, current member of What Tomorrow Brings. The statement also stated that a new album, EP and tour was under way.

=== Let the World Know (2012–2015) ===
It was announced in November 2013 that the band's new album, Let the World Know, was scheduled for release in mid-February 2014, and would be published by Spinefarm Records. Later that month, the band later confirmed the official release date of the album will be on 12 February 2014. The band released a new single on 6 December 2013 titled "As a Butterfly".

Shortly after the release of Let the World Know, Alexander Svenningson announced he had left the band and had been quickly replaced by Marcus Rosell, current member of Ends with a Bullet. On 3 November 2014, the band announced that Zandro Santiago had left to pursue a solo career of his own, and that Hjelm would take his place as the vocalist, returning to the role he had left in 2010.

Dead by April announced in July 2015 on their Facebook page that they were recording their fourth studio album. In late September 2015, they announced that their upcoming album will be out in 2016.

=== Worlds Collide (2015–2019) ===
In August 2016, the band announced that the upcoming album is officially completed. On 21 September 2016, they announced that their first single will be out in October/November 2016. They also will have a European "Breaking Tour" from 7–22 December 2016 in different places (Germany, Spain, Italy...) supported by ATHEENA and Beyond All Recognition. On 2 December 2016, they released a lyric video for the single "Breaking Point" on YouTube and on 27 January 2017, a lyric video was released for "My Heart Is Crushable".

On 7 April 2017, they released their fourth album Worlds Collide. On 19 April 2017, Andersson announced he parted ways with the band. In April 2017 the band confirmed Andersson's departure for personal reasons. On 2 May 2017, The band confirmed Jimmie Strimell has rejoined band via Facebook.

On 1 September 2017, the band released an EP Worlds Collide (Jimmie Strimell Sessions) which features Strimell on unclean vocals. On 15 September 2017, the band released a cover of the Linkin Park song "Numb" as a tribute to the late Chester Bennington, this is the first newly recorded material released since Strimell rejoined the band. On 20 October 2017, they released an acoustic EP Worlds Collide (Acoustic Sessions). On 26 December 2017, they released their first Christmas and instrumental cover of Franz Schubert's song "Marche Militaire".

On 29 January 2018, Hjelm posted on his Facebook profile that he has started writing new songs for the band. On 9 February 2018, the band posted on their Facebook page a picture of Strimell recording in the Studio PH Sweden having the description "Working on new songs #deadbyapril #2018". On 13 January 2019, Dead by April launched the April Army Platform, a subscription service that allows access to exclusive content such as the band's video diary, free band merch and remastered songs recorded with their current vocalist line-up.

=== New material and The Affliction (2019–present) ===
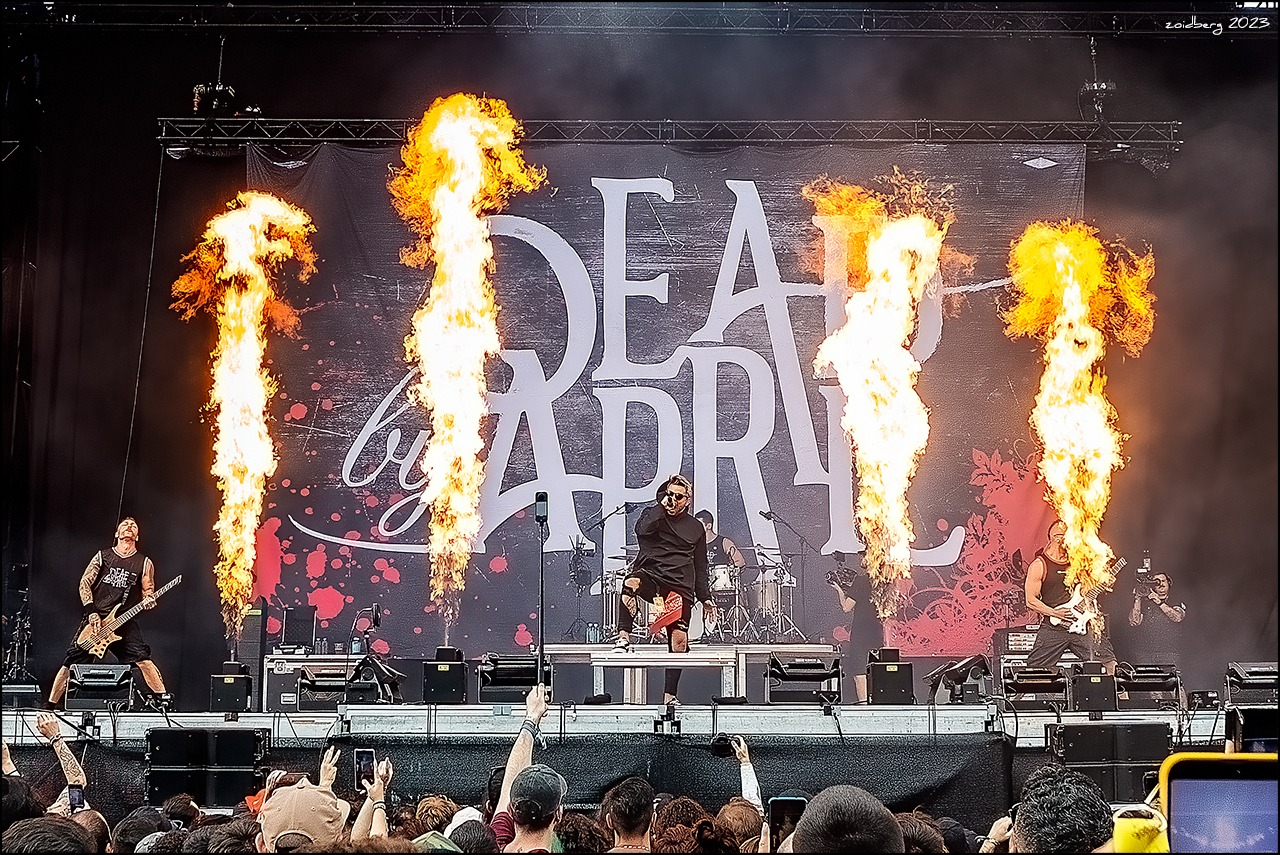
Dead by April performing at Resurrection Fest 2023

On 6 March 2020, Hjelm released a statement via the band's Facebook and website citing that Jimmie Strimell had been dismissed from the band for a second time; due to his continued drug and alcohol abuse, in spite of his own vows to stay sober. Shortly afterwards, Hjelm released a statement announcing dEMOTIONAL's lead growler Christopher Kristensen would replace Strimell on their current tour, explaining his position within the band as 'a trial run'. They also recorded a cover of "Let It Go" from the 2013 film Frozen.

Since then, the band has produced five new original songs with Kristensen on scream vocals; "Memory", "Bulletproof" (both released in 2020), "Heartbeat Failing", "Collapsing", and "Anything At All" in 2021.

In 2022, they have released two songs, called "Better than You" and "Me", and a 4-song EP titled "Heartbeat Failing (Piano Version)" with variations of the song "Heartbeat Failing".

In 2023, they released three more singles, "Wasteland (feat. The Day We Left Earth)", "Dreamlike", and "My Light". These singles are part of the band's new album The Affliction, released on 26 January 2024. On the day the album was released, the band also released "Outcome" as a single, featuring Smash Into Pieces and Samuel Ericsson. On 7 April 2024 drummer Marcus Rosell decided to leave the band.

== Musical style and influences ==
Often called the "Swedish metal Backstreet Boys", Dead by April has mainly been considered metalcore and post-hardcore. Dead by April is also known for using elements of music genres such as orchestral rock, techno, nu metal, melodic death metal, and emo. Dead by April are influenced by American singer Michael Jackson. Vocally, the band uses a combination of clean and unclean vocals.

== Band members ==
Current members

| Name | Years active | Instruments | Release contributions |
|---|---|---|---|
| Pontus Hjelm | 2007–2010; 2012–present (official); 2010–2012 (unofficial) | clean vocals (2007 - 2010 and since 2014); guitars & keyboards (since 2007) | All Dead by April releases |
| Marcus Wesslén | 2008–present | bass; backing screams (since 2016) | All Dead by April releases |
| Christopher Kristensen | 2020–present | screaming vocals; clean vocals (since 2023) | All Dead by April releases from "Memory" (2020) onwards |

Former members

| Name | Years active | Instruments | Release contributions |
|---|---|---|---|
| Johan Eskilsson | 2007 | guitars | none |
| Henric Liljesand | 2007 | bass | none |
| Johan Olsson | 2007–2010 | guitar; backing screams | All Dead by April releases until Stronger (2011) |
| Alexander Svenningson | 2007–2014 | drums | All Dead by April releases until Let the World Know (2014) |
| Zandro Santiago | 2010–2014 | clean vocals | All Dead by April releases from Stronger (2011) until Let the World Know (2014) |
| Christoffer Andersson | 2013–2017 | screams | Let the World Know (2014) & Worlds Collide (2017) |
| Jimmie Strimell | 2007–2013; 2017–2020 | screams; clean vocals | All Dead by April releases until Mystery (2012); Worlds Collide (Jimmie Strimell Sessions only) & Numb (both 2017) & Let the World Know (re-recording) (2019) |
| Marcus Rosell | 2014–2024; 2011 (session) | drums | All Dead by April releases from Worlds Collide (2017) to The Affliction (2024) |

Session and touring musicians

| Name | Years active | Instruments | Release contributions |
|---|---|---|---|
| Joel Nilsson | 2010 | guitar | |
| Jonas Ekdahl | 2010 | drums | |
| André Gonzales | 2012–2013 | guitar | |
| Anton Hognert | 2017–2018 | bass | |
| Richard Schill | 2024 | drums | |

Timeline

== Discography ==
Studio albums

- Dead by April (2009)
- Incomparable (2011)
- Let the World Know (2014)
- Worlds Collide (2017)
- The Affliction (2024)
