= Paul Bley discography =

This is the discography for Canadian jazz musician Paul Bley.

== As leader/co-leader ==
Recording date	Title	Label	Year released	Personnel/Notes
1953-11	Introducing Paul Bley	Debut	1954	Charles Mingus, Art Blakey
1954-02, 1954-08	Paul Bley	Wing	1955	Percy Heath/Peter Ind, Al Levitt
1957-08	Solemn Meditation	GNP	1958	Dave Pike, Charlie Haden, Lennie McBrowne
1958-10	Live at the Hilcrest Club 1958	Inner City	1976	Ornette Coleman, Don Cherry, Charlie Haden, Billy Higgins. live
1958-10	Coleman Classics Volume 1	Improvising Artists	1977	Ornette Coleman, Don Cherry, Charlie Haden, Billy Higgins. live
1962-08, 1963-09	Footloose!	Savoy	1963	Steve Swallow, Pete LaRoca; Complete version as The Floater Syndrome combining Floater.
1962-08, 1963-09	Floater	Savoy	1984	Steve Swallow, Pete LaRoca; Unreleased tracks of Footloose! sessions.
1962-08, 1963-09	The Floater Syndrome	Savoy	1986	Steve Swallow, Pete LaRoca; Complete version of Footloose!.
1964-03	Turns	Savoy	1987	John Gilmore, Gary Peacock, Paul Motian; Previously on New Music: 2nd Wave and Turning Point.
1964-10	Barrage	ESP-Disk	1965	Dewey Johnson, Marshall Allen, Eddie Gómez, Milford Graves
1965-11	Touching	Fontana	1965	Kent Carter, Barry Altschul
1965-12	Closer	ESP-Disk	1966	Steve Swallow, Barry Altschul
1966-07	Ramblin'	BYG Actuel	1967	Mark Levinson, Barry Altschul
1966-09, 1966-10	Blood	Fontana	1966	Mark Levinson, Barry Altschul
1965-11, 1966-11	Copenhagen and Haarlem	Arista/Freedom	1975	[2LP] Kent Carter, Mark Levinson, Barry Altschul; Live
1966-11	In Haarlem – Blood	Polydor	1967	Mark Levinson, Barry Altschul; Live
1967-06	Virtuosi	Improvising Artists	1976	Gary Peacock, Barry Altschul
1967-03, 1967-07	Ballads	ECM	1971	Mark Levinson/Gary Peacock, Barry Altschul
1964-03, 1968-05	Turning Point	Improvising Artists	1975	John Gilmore, Gary Peacock, Paul Motian/Bill Elgart
1963-04, 1968-05	Paul Bley with Gary Peacock	ECM	1970	Gary Peacock, Paul Motian/Billy Elgart
1968-05	Mr. Joy	Limelight	1968	Gary Peacock, Billy Elgart
1969-04, 1969-06, 1969-11	Revenge: The Bigger the Love the Greater the Hate	Polydor	1971	Annette Peacock and various others Live
1970-12, 1971-01, 1971-03	The Paul Bley Synthesizer Show	Milestone	1971	Dick Youngstein/Glen Moore/Frank Tusa, Steve Hass/Bobby Moses
1971-03	Improvisie	America	1971	Annette Peacock, Han Bennink; Live
1971-03, 1971-11	Dual Unity	Freedom	1972	Annette Peacock, Mario Pavone, Lawrence Cook/Han Bennink. Live
1972-09	Open, to Love	ECM	1972	Solo piano
1972-11	Paul Bley & Scorpio	Milestone	1973	Dave Holland, Barry Altschul
1973-06, 1973-07	Paul Bley/NHØP	SteepleChase	1973	Niels-Henning Ørsted Pedersen
1974-06	Jaco	Improvising Artists	1976	Jaco Pastorius, Pat Metheny, Bruce Ditmas. Live
1974-08	Alone, Again	Improvising Artists	1975	Solo piano
1974-11	Quiet Song	Improvising Artists	1975	Jimmy Giuffre, Bill Connors
1976-07	Japan Suite	Improvising Artists	1977	Gary Peacock, Barry Altschul. Live
1977-06	Pyramid	Improvising Artists	1977	Lee Konitz, Bill Connors
1977-07	Axis	Improvising Artists	1978	Solo piano. Live
1983-05	Tears	Owl	1984	Solo piano
1983-05	Tango Palace	Soul Note	1985	Solo piano
1983-05	Sonor	Soul Note	1984	George Cross McDonald
1985-02	Questions	SteepleChase	1985	Jesper Lundgaard, Aage Tanggaard
1985-02	Diane	SteepleChase	1985	Chet Baker
1985-03	Hot	Soul Note	1985	John Scofield, Steve Swallow, Barry Altschul. Live
1985-12	My Standard	SteepleChase	1986	Jesper Lundgaard, Billy Hart
1986-01	Fragments	ECM	1986	John Surman, Bill Frisell, Paul Motian
1986-03	Paul Bley & Jesper Lundgaard Live	SteepleChase	1986	Jesper Lundgaard. Live
1986-03	Paul Bley & Jesper Lundgaard Live Again	SteepleChase	1987	Jesper Lundgaard. Live
1987-05	Indian Summer	SteepleChase	1991	Ron McClure, Barry Altschul
1987-07	Notes	Soul Note	1987	Paul Motian
1987-11	The Paul Bley Quartet	ECM	1988	John Surman, Bill Frisell, Paul Motian
1987-12	Solo	Justin Time	1989	Solo piano
1988-03	Live at Sweet Basil	Soul Note	1988	John Abercrombie, Red Mitchell, Barry Altschul. live
1988-04	Solo Piano	Soul Note	1988	Solo piano
1988-11	The Nearness of You	SteepleChase	1989	Ron McClure, Billy Hart
1989-05	Blues for Red	Red	1989	Solo piano
1989-05	Rejoicing	SteepleChase	1990	Michał Urbaniak, Ron McClure, Barry Altschul
1989-12	The Life of a Trio: Saturday	Owl	1990	Jimmy Giuffre, Steve Swallow
1989-12	The Life of a Trio: Sunday	Owl	1990	Jimmy Giuffre, Steve Swallow
1989-12	Partners	Owl	1991	Gary Peacock
1989-12	BeBopBeBopBeBopBeBop	SteepleChase	1990	Bob Cranshaw, Keith Copeland
1990-03	Right Time, Right Place	GNP Crescendo	1990	Gary Burton
1990-05	12 (+6) In a Row	Hat Hut	1995	Hans Koch, Franz Koglmann
1990-07	Memoirs	Soul Note	1990	Charlie Haden, Paul Motian
1991-02	Changing Hands	Justin Time	1991	Solo piano
1991-03	Lyrics	Splasc(H)	1991	Tiziana Ghiglioni
1991?	A Musing	Justin Time	1991	Jon Ballantyne
1991-09	In the Evenings Out There	ECM	1993	John Surman, Gary Peacock, Tony Oxley
1991-12	Paul Plays Carla	SteepleChase	1992	Marc Johnson, Jeff Williams
1992-04	Mindset	Soul Note	1997	Gary Peacock
1992-04	Annette	Hat Hut	1993	Franz Koglmann, Gary Peacock
1992-04	Caravan Suite	SteepleChase	1993	Solo piano
1992-04	Homage to Carla	Owl	1993	Solo piano
1992-11	Paul Bley at Copenhagen Jazz House	SteepleChase	1994	Solo piano. Live
1993-03	Zen Palace	Transheart	1993	Steve Swallow, Paul Motian
1993-03	Hands On	Transheart	1993	Solo piano
1993-04	If We May	SteepleChase	1994	Jay Anderson, Adam Nussbaum
1993-08	Sweet Time	Justin Time	1994	Solo piano
1993-08	Double Time	Justin Time	1994	Jane Bunnett
1993-08	Know Time	Justin Time	1995	Herbie Spanier, Geordie McDonald
1993-08	Synth Thesis	Postcards	1994	Solo piano and synthesizer
1994-01	Time Will Tell	ECM	1995	Evan Parker, Barre Phillips
1994-03	Chaos	Soul Note	1998	Furio Di Castri, Tony Oxley
1994-07	Outside In	Justin Time	1995	Sonny Greenwich
1994-09	Modern Chant	Venus	1994	David Eyges, Bruce Ditmas
1994-09	Emerald Blue	Venus	1994	David Eyges, Bruce Ditmas
1994-10	Speechless	SteepleChase	1995	Rich Perry, Jay Anderson, Victor Lewis
1994-10	Reality Check	SteepleChase	1996	Jay Anderson, Victor Lewis
1996-04	Sankt Gerold	ECM	2000	Evan Parker, Barre Phillips. live
1997-04	Out of Nowhere	SteepleChase	1998	Lee Konitz, Jay Anderson, Billy Drummond
1997-09	Notes on Ornette	SteepleChase	1998	Jay Anderson, Jeff Hirshfield
1998-01	Not Two, Not One	ECM	1999	Gary Peacock, Paul Motian
1999-03	When will the blues leave?	ECM	2019	Bley, Peacock and Motian
1999-06	Echo	SME	1999	Masahiko Togashi
2000-07	Basics	Justin Time	2001	Solo piano
2001-06	Solo in Mondsee	ECM	2007	Solo piano. Live
2003-05	Nothing to Declare	Justin Time	2004	Solo piano
2007-05	About Time	Justin Time	2008	Solo piano
2008-08	Play Blue: Oslo Concert	ECM	2014	Solo piano. Live

== As sideman ==
With Don Ellis

- Essence (Pacific Jazz, 1962)
- Out of Nowhere (Candid, 1988) – rec. 1961

With Jimmy Giuffre and Steve Swallow

- 1961: The Jimmy Giuffre 3, Fusion (Verve)
- 1961: The Jimmy Giuffre 3, Thesis (Verve) – re-released by ECM together with Fusion (1992)
- 1961: Jimmy Giuffre Trio Live in Europe 1961 (Raretone, 1984)
- 1961: Emphasis, Stuttgart 1961 (hatART, 1993)
- 1961: Flight, Bremen 1961 (hatART, 1993)
- 1962: Free Fall (Columbia, 1963)
- 1989: The Life of a Trio: Saturday (Owl, 1990)
- 1989: The Life of a Trio: Sunday (Owl, 1990)
- 1992: Fly Away Little Bird (Owl, 1992)
- 1993: Conversations with a Goose (Soul Note, 1996)

With Sonny Rollins

- Sonny Meets Hawk! (RCA Victor, 1963)
- Tokyo 1963 (Rare Live Recordings, 1963)

With others

- Jakob Bro, Bro/Knak (Loveland, 2011)[2CD]
- Marion Brown, Sweet Earth Flying (Impulse!, 1974)
- Satoko Fujii, Something About Water (Libra, 1996)
- Charlie Haden, The Montreal Tapes: with Paul Bley and Paul Motian (Verve, 1994) – rec. 1989
- Lee Konitz, Out of Nowhere (SteepleChase, 1997)
- Charlie Parker, Montreal 1953 (Uptown UPCD 27.36, 1993) – rec. 1953
- Mario Pavone, Trio Arc (Playscape, 2008) – rec. 2007
- John Surman, Adventure Playground (ECM, 1992) – rec. 1991
- Andreas Willers, In the North (Between the Lines, 2001)
