= Virtuosi (album) =

Studio album by Barry Altschul, Paul Bley & Gary Peacock
- Released: 1976
- Recorded: June 28, 1967; Nola's Penthouse Sound Studios, NYC
- Genre: Jazz
- Length: 33:11
- Label: Improvising Artists IAI 373844
- Producer: Paul Bley

Paul Bley chronology
In Haarlem - Blood (1966)	Virtuosi (1976)	Ballads (1963-67)

Virtuosi is an album by drummer Barry Altschul, pianist Paul Bley and bassist Gary Peacock recorded in 1967 and released on Bley's own Improvising Artists label in 1976.

== Reception ==
Professional ratings
Review scores
Source	Rating
AllMusic	2.5/5 stars
MusicHound Jazz	4/5 stars
The Penguin Guide to Jazz	3/4 stars
The Rolling Stone Jazz Record Guide	5/5 stars
The Virgin Encyclopedia of Jazz	4/5 stars

The editors of AllMusic awarded the album 2½ stars, and reviewer Eugene Chadbourne suggested that listeners could find the music "either endlessly fascinating if the time is there to focus on every detail, or a kind of irrelevant background patter whose components could be reordered endlessly without any change in meaning."

The authors of The Penguin Guide to Jazz Recordings noted that the album "sounds... very much like Bley's own trio work of the period," and stated: "Bley... tends to dominate proceedings, though Altschul's continuous flow of ideas would be impressive were it registered more distinctly; not even CD gives a faithful rendition of some of his softer figures and effects."

Writing for MusicHound Jazz, Steve Holtje commented: "to hear this trio's kaleidoscopic deployment of its considerable yet restrained resources is to witness improvisational interaction at the highest level."

== Track listing ==
1. "Butterflies" (Annette Peacock) - 15:54
2. "Gary" (Peacock) - 17:10

== Personnel ==
- Paul Bley - piano
- Gary Peacock - bass
- Barry Altschul - drums
