= Sweet Time =

Sweet Time may refer to:

- "Sweet Time", song by American rock band REO Speedwagon on 1982 Good Trouble (album)
- Sweet Time, 1993 album by Canadian jazz musician Paul Bley (Paul Bley discography)
- "Sweet Time", song by American electronic music producer Porter Robinson on 2021 Nurture (album)
