= Tango Palace =

Tango Palace may refer to:

- Tango Palace (Paul Bley album), 1985
- Tango Palace (Dr. John album), 1979
- Tango Palace (María Irene Fornés play), written in 1962, first performed 1963
