= Sonor (album) =

Studio album by Paul Bley
- Released: 1984
- Recorded: May 22, 1983
- Genre: Jazz
- Length: 39:35
- Label: Soul Note
- Producer: Giovanni Bonandrini

Paul Bley chronology
Tango Palace (1983)	Sonor (1984)	Questions (1985)

Sonor is an album by Canadian jazz pianist Paul Bley recorded in 1983 and released on the Italian Soul Note label.

== Reception ==
The Allmusic review by Eugene Chadbourne awarded the album 2½ stars, stating: "For Paul Bley to comment that this 1983 recording is the best collection of his music to emerge since 1961 is a provocative statement unless, knowing Bley, he's just kidding around. Since this is even more spaced-out than some of his famous "slow" recordings such as Ballads, does that mean he really wanted those recordings to be even more minimal than they were?... The demanding listener may not forgive Bley for having tapped a vein of boredom, but perhaps this enigmatic jazz figure was trying to prove that there is no such thing."

Professional ratings
Review scores
Source	Rating
Allmusic	2.5/5 stars

== Track listing ==
All compositions by Paul Bley

1. "Little Bells" - 4:59
2. "Landscape" - 3:45
3. "Speed" - 3:10
4. "Recollection" - 2:48
5. "Joined" - 4:46
6. "Sonor" - 6:24
7. "Waltz" - 3:34
8. "Set" - 3:49
9. "Darkness" - 5:00
10. "Tight Rope" - 1:20

- Recorded at Barigozzi Studio in Milano, Italy, on May 22, 1983.

== Personnel ==
- Paul Bley — piano
- George Cross McDonald — percussion
