= Bill Elgart =

American jazz musician

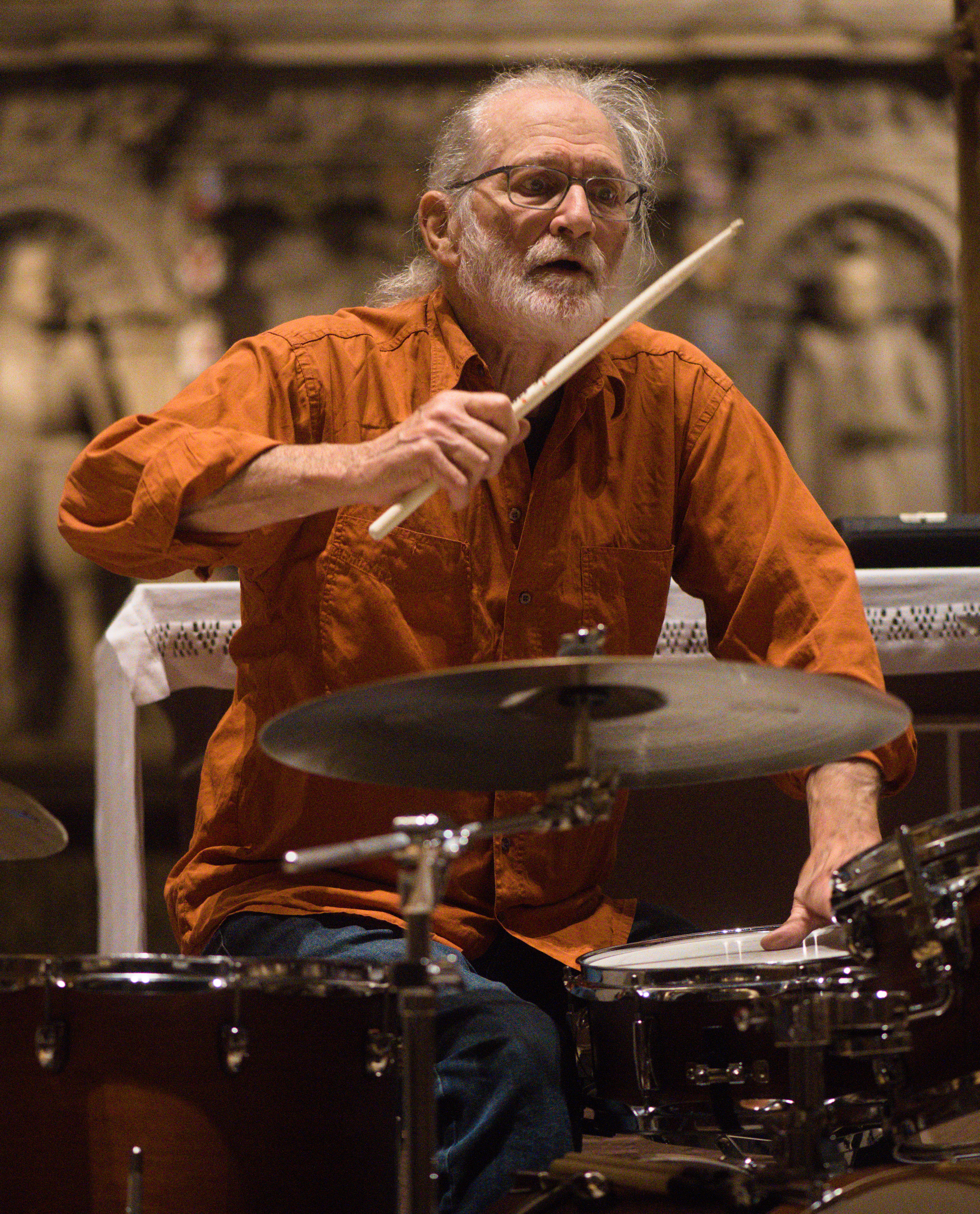
Bill Elgart, 2022

Bill Elgart or Billy Elgart (born November 9, 1942, Cambridge, Massachusetts) is an expatriate American jazz drummer. He is related to Les and Larry Elgart.

Elgart was born in Chelsea, Massachusetts. He studied at the Berklee College of Music and was a student of Alan Dawson. In 1968 he made his recording debut on Mr. Joy, with Paul Bley and Gary Peacock.

He moved to Europe in 1976, settling first in Salzburg, Austria and later in Ulm, Germany. He played in the groups Zollsound 4, Sundial Trio, Caoma, and the Annemarie Roelofs Projekt.

From 2001 he has been professor for Jazz Percussion at the University of Music Würzburg.

== Discography ==
=== As leader ===
- A Life (Mark Levinson, 1976)
- Jazz at Long Wharf (Mark Levinson, 1978)
- Sun Dial (Rst, 1985)
- Iliad (Rst, 1986)
- O'Mara/Darling/Elgart (Core, 1988)

=== As sideman ===
With Paul Bley

- Mr. Joy (Limelight, 1968)
- Paul Bley with Gary Peacock (ECM, 1970)
- Turning Point (Improvising Artists, 1975)

With Claudio Fasoli

- Cities (RAM 1993)
- Ten Tributes (RAM 1995)
- Trois Trios (Splasc(H), 1999)

With others

- Franco D'Andrea, Franco D'Andrea Trio (YVP Music 1989)
- Karl Berger, No Man Is an Island (Douglas Music, 1997)
- Kent Carter, Plaything (NoBusiness, 2014)
- Wolfgang Lackerschmid, One More Life (Bhakti, 1992)
- Guenter Lenz, Strict Minimum (Jazzwerkstatt, 2007)
- Charlie Mariano, Somewhere, out there (New Edition, 2013)
- Martin Mull, Martin Mull (Capricorn, 1972)
- Jim Pepper, Polar Bear Stomp (EmArcy, 2003)
- Tomasz Stanko, Caoma (Konnex, 1993)
- Sadao Watanabe, Sadao & Charlie Again (JVC, 2006)
- Eric Watson, The Fool School (AA, 1993)
- Kenny Wheeler, Flutter By, Butterfly (Soul Note, 1987)
- Leszek Zadlo, Breath (Enja, 1989)
