= L'Heure Bleue =

Studio album by Franz Koglmann
- Released: 1991
- Recorded: April 15–17 and March 20 & 21, 1991
- Studio: Haus der Begegnung Mariahilf, Vienna, Austria and Foundation Artist House, Boswil, Switzerland
- Genre: Jazz
- Length: 70:32
- Label: HatART; CD 6093
- Producer: Pia Uehlinger, Werner X. Uehlinger

Franz Koglmann chronology
| A White Line (1990) | L'Heure Bleue (1991) | Annette (1992) |

L'Heure Bleue is an album by trumpeter/flugelhornist Franz Koglmann which was recorded in Austria and Switzerland in 1991 and released on the Swiss HatART label.

== Reception ==
Professional ratings
Review scores
| Source | Rating |
|---|---|
| Allmusic | 4.5/5 stars |

The Allmusic review by Thom Jurek states: "This intimacy, this quiet brilliance and restraint that Koglmann shows here on his works -- some of which were initially written for and performed by the Pipetet -- is a statement not only of how versed the man is in the traditions of jazz and classical music but just how aware he is of his own mates' musical strengths".

== Track listing ==
All compositions by Franz Koglmann except where noted

1. "Leopard Lady" – 7:14
2. "Moon Dreams" (Chummy MacGregor) – 3:22
3. "My Old Flame" (Arthur Johnston) – 3:17
4. "Monoblue" – 6:33
5. "Night and Day" (Cole Porter) – 5:25
6. "Baite" (Tony Fruscella) – 5:56
7. "It Isn't Easy" (Ralph Richardson) – 8:10
8. "L'Heure Bleue" – 7:13
9. "Slow Fox" – 3:35
10. "For Bix" – 6:00
11. "Blue Angel" (Burkhard Stangl) – 4:28
12. "Black Beauty" (Duke Ellington) – 5:12
13. "Nachts" – 4:07

== Personnel ==
- Franz Koglmann – trumpet, flugelhorn
- Misha Mengelberg – piano (tracks 3, 6, 9 & 13)
- Tony Coe – clarinet, tenor saxophone (tracks 1, 2, 4, 5, 7, 8 & 10–12)
- Burkhard Stangl – guitar (tracks 1, 2, 4, 5, 7, 8 & 10–12)
- Klaus Koch – bass (tracks 1, 2, 4, 5, 7, 8 & 10–12)
