= Changing Hands =

Studio album by Paul Bley
- Released: 1991
- Recorded: February 25–26, 1991
- Studios: Studio Tempo, Montreal, Canada
- Genre: Jazz
- Length: 47:40
- Label: Justin Time JUST 040-2
- Producer: Jim West

Paul Bley chronology
Right Time, Right Place (1990)	Changing Hands (1991)	In the Evenings Out There (1991)

Changing Hands is a solo album by pianist Paul Bley recorded in 1991 and released on the Justin Time label.

== Reception ==
Professional ratings
Review scores
Source	Rating
Allmusic	3/5 stars

The Allmusic site awarded the album 3 out of 5 stars.

== Track listing ==
All compositions by Paul Bley except as indicated

1. "Changing Hands" - 6:50
2. "Juanita" - 7:58
3. "Willow" - 6:37
4. "Longer" - 9:29
5. "Summertime" - 6:58
6. "U-Nighted" - 6:58
7. "Pleasing You" - 2:50

== Personnel ==
- Paul Bley – piano
