= Not Two, Not One =

Studio album by Paul Bley / Gary Peacock / Paul Motian
- Released: February 15, 1999
- Recorded: January 1998
- Studio: Avatar (New York, New York)
- Genre: Jazz
- Length: 62:31
- Label: ECM; ECM 1670
- Producer: Manfred Eicher

Paul Bley chronology
| Notes on Ornette (1997) | Not Two, Not One (1999) | Basics (2000) |

Not Two, Not One is an album by pianist Paul Bley, bassist Gary Peacock and drummer Paul Motian, recorded for ECM in January 1998 and released on February 15, 1999.

== Reception ==
The AllMusic review by Steve Loewy states, "None of the pieces drift, as these three masters contribute a mature perspective that comes from varied experience. Remarkable interplay, chamber-free harmonies, and loose improvisations add up to some special sounds."

Professional ratings
Review scores
| Source | Rating |
|---|---|
| AllMusic | 4/5 stars |
| The Penguin Guide to Jazz Recordings | 3/4 stars |

== Track listing ==
All compositions by Paul Bley except as indicated

1. "Not Zero: In Three Parts" (Gary Peacock, Paul Bley, Paul Motian) - 9:34
2. "Entelechy" (Peacock) - 2:08
3. "Now" - 4:35
4. "Fig Foot" - 5:38
5. "Vocal Tracked" - 5:24
6. "Intente" (Peacock) - 5:41
7. "Noosphere" (Peacock, Bley) - 7:07
8. "Set Up Set" (Peacock) - 6:19
9. "Dialogue amour" (Peacock, Bley) - 8:07
10. "Don't You Know" (Peacock, Bley) - 6:57
11. "Not Zero: In One Part" (Peacock, Bley, Motian) - 0:55

== Personnel ==
- Paul Bley – piano
- Gary Peacock – bass
- Paul Motian – drums
