= Japan Suite =

Live album by Paul Bley, Barry Altschul & Gary Peacock
- Released: 1977
- Recorded: July 25, 1976; Yamaha Music Festival, Nemu No Sato, Shima, Mie, Japan
- Genre: Jazz
- Length: 31:51
- Label: Improvising Artists IAI 373849
- Producer: Carol Goss & Paul Bley

Paul Bley chronology
Quiet Song (1974)	Japan Suite (1977)	Pyramid (1977)

Japan Suite is a live album by pianist Paul Bley, drummer Barry Altschul and bassist Gary Peacock recorded in Japan in 1976 and released on Bley's own Improvising Artists label in 1977.

== Reception ==
Professional ratings
Review scores
Source	Rating
Allmusic	2/5 stars
The Penguin Guide to Jazz	3/4 stars
The Rolling Stone Jazz Record Guide	4/5 stars

Allmusic awarded the album 2 stars noting the performance is "certainly more fiery than many of the other recordings by the trio and has its colorful moments". The Penguin Guide to Jazz called it "a set of remarkable intensity, even by the standards of these fiery players".

== Track listing ==
All compositions by Paul Bley

1. "Japan Suite I" - 19:22
2. "Japan Suite II" - 12:26

== Personnel ==
- Paul Bley - piano
- Gary Peacock - bass
- Barry Altschul - drums, percussion
