= Annette (album) =

Studio album by Paul Bley, Franz Koglmann and Gary Peacock
- Released: 1993
- Recorded: April 12–14, 1992; Radio Bremen, Bremen, Germany
- Genre: Jazz
- Length: 64:50
- Label: hat ART 6118
- Producers: Peter Schulze & Volker Steppat

Paul Bley chronology
Mindset (1992)	Annette (1993)	Caravan Suite (1992)

Franz Koglmann chronology
L'Heure Bleue (1991)	Annette (1992)	We Thought About Duke (1994)

Annette is an album by Paul Bley with Franz Koglmann and Gary Peacock recorded in Germany in 1992 and released on the hat ART label in 1993. The album features compositions by Annette Peacock.

== Reception ==
Professional ratings
Review scores
Source	Rating
AllMusic	4.5/5 stars
The Guardian	3/5 stars
The Penguin Guide to Jazz Recordings	3.5/4 stars

The Independent review by Richard Williams noted "Bley has been exploring the likes of 'Blood', 'Touching' and 'Mister Joy' for most of his long career, but still manages to find something new within their strange, elliptical, allusive contours". Thom Jurek of AllMusic states, "With this album, the trio of Bley, Peacock, and Koglmann has created more than just a tribute to a great if nearly completely unknown artist -- it has offered a look deep inside the musical psyche of a true original". The Guardian review by John Fordham awarded the album 3 stars observing "Bley's unplugged trio – with Austrian trumpeter Franz Koglmann and Annette Peacock's first husband Gary Peacock on bass – doesn't mimic or cover its subject's work. Instead, it takes up the free-improv invitation of her melancholy, minor-key miniatures... Peacock's avant-pop connections, however, shouldn't fool anyone into thinking this is anything other than a mostly low-key, acoustic free-jazz conversation".

== Track listing ==
All compositions by Annette Peacock except as indicated

1. "Touching (Take 1)" – 5:51
2. "El Cordobes" – 8:31
3. "Cartoon" – 6:26
4. "Albert's Love Theme" – 3:46
5. "Kid Dynamite" – 4:26
6. "Miracles" – 6:47
7. "Blood (Take 1)" – 5:03
8. "Annette" (Paul Bley, Gary Peacock, Franz Koglmann) – 6:26
9. "Both" – 4:26
10. "Blood (Take 2)" – 2:46
11. "Mister Joy" – 8:37
12. "Touching (Take 2)" – 1:45

== Personnel ==
- Paul Bley – piano
- Franz Koglmann – trumpet, flugelhorn
- Gary Peacock – bass
