= Voices (Gary Peacock album) =

Studio album by Gary Peacock
- Released: June 21, 1971
- Recorded: April 5, 1971
- Studio: Mohri Studio, Tokyo.
- Genre: Jazz
- Length: 53:05
- Label: Sony Records SRCS 9334
- Producer: Kiyoski Itoh

Gary Peacock chronology
Eastward (1970)	Voices (1971)	Tales of Another (1977)

Masabumi Kikuchi chronology
Poesy (1971)	Voices (1971)	Masabumi Kikuchi with Gil Evans (1972)

Voices is a studio album by American bassist Gary Peacock featuring pianist Masabumi Kikuchi, percussionist Masahiko Togashi and drummer Hiroshi Murakami. The album was recorded in Tokyo in 1971 and released via Sony Records label.

== Reception ==
Peter Margasak of Chicago Reader stated "On these early recordings with Peacock, Masabumi Kikuchi hadn't quite achieved the Spartan sound he eventually mastered, but he was on his way, playing mercurial lines amid Peacock's churning patterns. The 1971 album Voices, a trio session with alternating drummers Masahiko Togashi and Hiroshi Murakami, has been stuck in my CD player for days. It occupies the same meditative, questing terrain explored by Paul Bley before its release and by Keith Jarrett after. I'm a sucker for its elegant sense of dynamics, which gives empty space a crucial role in the arrangements and improvisations."

== Track listing ==
All tracks are written by Gary Peacock.

No.	Title	Length
1.	"Ishi"	11:50
2.	"Bonsho"	6:14
3.	"Hollows"	7:50
4.	"Voice from the Past"	11:19
5.	"Requiem"	6:05
6.	"Ae. Ay."	9:47
Total length:		53:05

== Personnel ==
Band

- Gary Peacock – bass
- Masabumi Kikuchi – piano, electric piano
- Masahiko Togashi – percussion (tracks: 1 2 3 4 6)
- Hiroshi Murakami – drums (tracks: 1 2 3 5 6)

Production

- Kiyoshi Ito – producer
- Kenichi Handa – recording
