= Improvising Artists =

American record label

Improvising Artists Inc. (IAI) is a production company created in 1974 by jazz pianist Paul Bley and video artist Carol Goss for the purpose of recording improvised music and video art.

== Discography ==
Catalog number	Artist	Title
37.38.39	Paul Bley - Jimmy Giuffre - Bill Connors	Quiet Song
37.38.40	Paul Bley	Alone, Again
37.38.41	Paul Bley - John Gilmore - Gary Peacock - Paul Motian	Turning Point
37.38.42	Ran Blake	Breakthru
37.38.43	Sam Rivers - Dave Holland	Dave Holland / Sam Rivers
37.38.44	Barry Altschul - Paul Bley - Gary Peacock	Virtuosi
37.38.45	Lee Konitz - Paul Bley - Bill Connors	Pyramid
37.38.46	Jaco Pastorius - Pat Metheny - Bruce Ditmas - Paul Bley	Jaco
37.38.47	Steve Lacy - Michael Smith	Sidelines
37.38.48	Sam Rivers - Dave Holland	Sam Rivers / Dave Holland Vol. 2
37.38.49	Paul Bley - Gary Peacock - Barry Altschul	Japan Suite
37.38.50	Sun Ra	Solo Piano
37.38.51	Almanac	Almanac
37.38.52	Paul Bley - Ornette Coleman - Don Cherry - Billy Higgins - Charlie Haden	Coleman Classics Volume 1
37.38.53	Paul Bley	Axis
37.38.54	Lester Bowie - Philip Wilson	Duet
37.38.55	Marion Brown - Gunter Hampel	Reeds 'n Vibes
37.38.56	Perry Robinson - Badal Roy - Nana Vasconcelos	Kundalini
37.38.57	Michael Gregory Jackson - Oliver Lake	Karmonic Suite
37.38.58	Sun Ra	St. Louis Blues
37.38.59	Jimmy Giuffre - Lee Konitz - Bill Connors - Paul Bley	IAI Festival
37.38.60	Vanessa Bley	"Seasons"
