= Masabumi Kikuchi with Gil Evans =

Studio album by Masabumi Kikuchi with Gil Evans
- Released: 1972
- Recorded: July 5, 1972
- Venue: Tokyo, Japan
- Studio: Victor Studio
- Genre: jazz
- Label: LP: Philips [Japan]; CD: EmArcy
- Producer: Masaharu Honjo

Masabumi Kikuchi chronology
Voices (1971)	Masabumi Kikuchi with Gil Evans (1972)	Hollow Out (1973)

Gil Evans chronology
Satin Doll (1972)	Masabumi Kikuchi with Gil Evans (1972)	Svengali (1973)

Masabumi Kikuchi with Gil Evans is a studio album led by jazz pianist and composer Masabumi Kikuchi with support of Gil Evans, recorded during Gil's first visitation to Japan in 1972. CD version was released from EmArcy label in 1989 with additional three tracks.

== Background ==
Masabumi Kikuchi first visited and met with Gil Evans in the spring of 1972 when Masabumi had been traveling to New York City to join in Elvin Jones' group. Masabumi and Gil hit it off to organize hybrid orchestra from Japan and the US. Toshinari Koinuma had managed to coordinate the personnels, hired 21 Japanese players besides Masabumi, and Gil visited Japan for the first time with Billy Harper and Marvin Peterson. The three men arrived at Haneda Airport on June 22.

The concert was named "Kikuchi Masabumi Recital", and held at four cities; started from Tokyo on 27th, Osaka, Wakayama and Nagoya. Although the original plan was to do live recording at Tokyo concert, Masabumi and Gil insisted studio recording after all the concerts. The three men had attended and experienced another studio recording of Kimiko Kasai's album Satin Doll at CBS/Sony 1st Studio in Tokyo on 26th. All the orchestra members came together at Victor Studio in Tokyo again on July 4, and the recording took all night long.

== Track listing ==
No.	Title	Writer(s)	Length
1.	"Ictus"	Carla Bley	1:41
2.	"Thoroughbred"	Billy Harper	10:36
3.	"Priestess"	Billy Harper	9:10
4.	"Love in The Open"	Gil Evans	11:31
5.	"Drizzling Rain (驟雨, Syu-u)"	Masabumi Kikuchi	6:03
6.	"Eleven #11" (Bonus track in CD release. previously known as "Little Stuff".)	Gil Evans and Miles Davis	2:39
7.	"Cry of Hunger" (Bonus track in CD release.)	Billy Harper	13:11
8.	"Love In The Open" (Take 2. Bonus track in CD release.)	Gil Evans	12:51

== Personnel ==
- Masabumi Kikuchi – electric piano
- Gil Evans – conductor, piano
- Billy Harper – tenor sax, flute, chime
- Marvin Peterson – trumpet, flugel horn
- Kohsuke Mine – alto sax, soprano sax
- Shigeo Suzuki – alto sax, flute
- Kiyoshige Matsubara – French horn
- Nao Yamamoto – French horn
- Shozo Nakagawa – piccolo flute, alto flute, bass flute
- Takashi Asahi – piccolo flute, alto flute, bass flute
- Yukio Etoh – piccolo flute, alto flute, bass flute
- Kunitoshi Shinohara – trumpet, flugel horn
- Takehisa Suzuki – trumpet, flugel horn
- Hiroshi Munekiyo – tuba
- Kikuzo Tado – tuba
- Tadataka Nakazawa – bass tuba
- Michiko Takahashi – marimba, vibraphone
- Masayuki Takayanagi – electric guitar
- Sadanori Nakamure – electric guitar
- Yoshio Suzuki – bass
- Isao Etoh – electric bass
- Masahiko Togashi – drums
- Yoshiyuki Nakamura – drums
- Kohichi Yamaguchi – timpani
- Hideo Miyata – percussion
