= December Poems =

Studio album by Gary Peacock
- Released: 1979
- Recorded: December 1977
- Studios: Talent, Oslo, Norway
- Genre: Jazz
- Length: 42:36
- Label: ECM 1119
- Producer: Manfred Eicher

Gary Peacock chronology
Tales of Another (1977)	December Poems (1979)	Shift in the Wind (1980)

December Poems is a solo album by American jazz bassist Gary Peacock, recorded in December 1977 and released on the ECM label in 1979; Norwegian saxophonist Jan Garbarek makes a guest appearance for two duets.

== Reception ==
Professional ratings
Review scores
Source	Rating
AllMusic	3/5 stars
DownBeat	4/5 stars
The Penguin Guide to Jazz Recordings	3/4 stars
The Rolling Stone Jazz Record Guide	3/5 stars
Tom Hull – on the Web	B+

The AllMusic review by David R. Adler stated: "Despite the sparse and somewhat cold feeling of the record, Peacock's virtuosity and sterling tone are well-served in a solo format."

DownBeat reviewer Art Lange wrote, "December Poems is a gem of an album".

== Track listing ==
All compositions by Gary Peacock

1. "Snow Dance" - 7:24
2. "Winterlude" - 6:02
3. "A Northern Tale" - 6:18
4. "December Greenwings" - 7:44
5. "Flower Crystals" - 5:09
6. "Celebrations" - 9:49

== Personnel ==
- Gary Peacock – bass
- Jan Garbarek (tracks 2 & 4) – tenor saxophone, soprano saxophone
