= The Nearness of You (Paul Bley album) =

Studio album by Paul Bley Trio
- Released: 1989
- Recorded: November 21, 1988; Copenhagen
- Genre: Jazz
- Length: 65:37
- Label: SteepleChase SCS 1246
- Producer: Nils Winther

Paul Bley chronology
Solo Piano (1988)	The Nearness of You (1989)	Blues for Red (1989)

The Nearness of You is an album of jazz standards by pianist Paul Bley recorded in Denmark in 1988 and released on the SteepleChase label.

== Reception ==
Professional ratings
Review scores
Source	Rating
Allmusic	4/5 stars
The Penguin Guide to Jazz Recordings	3/4 stars

Allmusic awarded the album 4 stars stating "This is Bley at his level jamming best. If this had been a cutting session, I'd have hated to be the horn player".

== Track listing ==
1. "This Can't Be Love" (Lorenz Hart, Richard Rodgers) - 5:35
2. "The Nearness of You" (Hoagy Carmichael, Ned Washington) - 12:54
3. "What a Difference a Day Makes" (Stanley Adams, María Mendez Grever) - 7:28
4. "These Foolish Things" (Harry Link, Holt Marvell, Jack Strachey) - 4:35 Bonus track on CD
5. "Blues in the Closet" (Oscar Pettiford) - 11:30 Bonus track on CD
6. "Lullaby of Birdland" (George Shearing, George David Weiss) - 6:20
7. "We'll Be Together Again" (Carl Fischer, Frankie Laine) - 10:44
8. "Take the "A" Train" (Billy Strayhorn) - 6:50

== Personnel ==
- Paul Bley - piano
- Ron McClure - bass
- Billy Hart - drums
