= Footloose! =

Studio album by Paul Bley
- Released: 1963
- Recorded: August 17, 1962 and September 12, 1963
- Studio: Medallion Studios, Newark, New Jersey
- Genre: Jazz
- Length: 33:38
- Label: Savoy; MG-12182
- Producer: Fred Mendelsohn

Paul Bley chronology
Coleman Classics Volume 1 (1958)	Footloose! (1963)	Barrage (1964)

Footloose! is an album led by jazz pianist Paul Bley featuring tracks recorded in 1962 & 1963 and released on the Savoy label. Tracks from this album, along with alternate takes and addition material from the sessions, were later released as Syndrome and Floater.

== Reception ==
Professional ratings
Review scores
Source	Rating
Allmusic	4/5 stars
Down Beat	4/5 stars

Allmusic described it as "one of Bley's most enjoyable albums". Rough Guide author Ian Carr calls the album "classic and highly influential" stating that the "quiet, focused intensity persists throughout." Fellow pianist Keith Jarrett said he listened to the album "thousands of times."

== Track listing ==
All compositions by Paul Bley, except as indicated

1. "When Will The Blues Leave" (Ornette Coleman) - 6:08
2. "Floater" (Carla Bley) - 6:23
3. "Turns" - 3:14
4. "Around Again" (Carla Bley) - 4:04
5. "Syndrome" (Carla Bley) - 7:07
6. "Cousins" - 4:39
7. "King Korn" (Carla Bley) - 3:57
8. "Vashkar" (Carla Bley) - 4:06

=== Alternate releases ===
Floater:

This 1984 album included tracks 1–4 and added the following tracks recorded at the same sessions:

- "Stereophrenic" (David Baker) - 5:06 (Note: some editions misspell title as "Stereophonic", and mistakenly credit Paul Bley as composer. This composition was previously recorded for George Russell's The Stratus Seekers).
- "Circle with the Hole in the Middle" (Coleman) - 5:08
- "Ballad No. 4" - 4:50

Syndrome:

This 1986 album included tracks 5–8 and added the following tracks recorded at the same sessions:

- "Around Again" [alternate take] (Carla Bley) - 3:53
- "Ballad I" - 4:29
- "King Korn" [alternate take] (Carla Bley) - 4:17
- "Ballad II" - 3:47

== Personnel ==
- Paul Bley - piano
- Steve Swallow - bass
- Pete LaRoca - drums
