= Coleman Classics Volume 1 =

1977 live album

Live album by Paul Bley, Ornette Coleman, Don Cherry, Charlie Haden and Billy Higgins
- Released: 1977
- Recorded: October 1958
- Venues: The Hilcrest Club, Los Angeles, California
- Genre: Jazz
- Length: 35:14
- Label: Improvising Artists IAI 37.38.52
- Producer: Paul Bley

Paul Bley chronology
Live at the Hilcrest Club 1958 (1958)	Coleman Classics Volume 1 (1977)	Footloose! (1963)

Coleman Classics Volume 1 is a live album by pianist Paul Bley, saxophonist Ornette Coleman, trumpeter Don Cherry, drummer Billy Higgins and bassist Charlie Haden recorded in California in 1958 and released Bley's on the Improvising Artists label in 1977. The album is an early live recording of Ornette Coleman, made shortly after his first album, Something Else!!!! and featuring the group (without Bley) that would soon record the Atlantic albums The Shape of Jazz to Come (1959) and Change of the Century (1960).

== Reception ==
Professional ratings
Review scores
Source	Rating
Allmusic	4/5 stars
DownBeat	3/5 stars
The Rolling Stone Jazz Record Guide	3/5 stars

Allmusic reviewer Scott Yanow observed: "Coleman already had his very original style pretty much together at this early stage. Paul Bley was wise enough to mostly stay out of the way and he clearly benefited from this encounter with some of the pioneers of free jazz".

== Track listing ==
All compositions by Ornette Coleman except as indicated

1. "When Will The Blues Leave" - 14:06
2. "Crossroads" - 2:00
3. "Rambling" - 14:28
4. "How Deep Is the Ocean" (Irving Berlin) - 4:40

== Personnel ==
- Paul Bley - piano
- Ornette Coleman - alto saxophone
- Don Cherry - cornet
- Charlie Haden - bass
- Billy Higgins - drums
