= My Standard =

Studio album by Paul Bley Trio
- Released: 1986
- Recorded: December 8, 1985
- Studio: Sound Track Studios, Copenhagen
- Genre: Jazz
- Length: 64:16
- Label: SteepleChase
- Producer: Nils Winther

Paul Bley chronology
Hot (1985)	My Standard (1986)	Fragments (1986)

My Standard is an album of jazz standards by pianist Paul Bley recorded in Denmark in 1985 and released on the SteepleChase label.

== Reception ==
Professional ratings
Review scores
Source	Rating
AllMusic	4/5 stars
The Penguin Guide to Jazz Recordings	3/4 stars

AllMusic awarded the album 4 stars, stating that Bley "avoids the obvious and comes up with something new to say".

== Track listing ==
1. "I'm Glad There Is You" (Jimmy Dorsey, Paul Madeira) – 2:59 Bonus track on CD
2. "Santa Claus Is Coming to Town" (John Frederick Coots, Haven Gillespie) – 3:06
3. "Lover Man" (Jimmy Davis, Ram Ramirez, Jimmy Sherman) – 5:30
4. "All the Things You Are" (Oscar Hammerstein II, Jerome Kern) – 3:02
5. "Long Ago (and Far Away)" (Ira Gershwin, Jerome Kern) – 4:29
6. "Black and Blue" (Harry Brooks, Andy Razaf, Fats Waller) – 4:47
7. "How Long Has This Been Going On?" (George Gershwin, Ira Gershwin) – 2:30 Bonus track on CD
8. "A.R.B." (Paul Bley) – 6:18 Bonus track on CD
9. "Blues Waltz" (Bley) – 3:06 Bonus track on CD
10. "I Wish I Knew" (Mack Gordon, Harry Warren) – 3:43
11. "If I'm Lucky" (Eddie DeLange, Josef Myrow) – 3:09
12. "You'd Be So Nice to Come Home To" (Cole Porter) – 4:57
13. "I Can't Get Started" (Vernon Duke, Ira Gershwin) – 4:03
14. "The Theme" (Traditional) - 4:45
15. "Becky" (Bley) – 5:11 Bonus track on CD
16. "Bolivar Blues" (Thelonious Monk) – 2:18 Bonus track on CD
17. "Goodbye" (Gordon Jenkins) – 2:13 Bonus track on CD

== Personnel ==
- Paul Bley – piano
- Jesper Lundgaard – bass
- Billy Hart – drums
