= In the Evenings out There =

Studio album by Paul Bley
- Released: September 1993
- Recorded: September 1991
- Studio: Rainbow Studio; Oslo, Norway
- Genre: Avant-garde jazz, free jazz
- Length: 56:11
- Label: ECM; ECM 1488
- Producer: Manfred Eicher

Paul Bley chronology
Changing Hands (1991)	In the Evenings out There (1993)	Paul Plays Carla (1992)

In the Evenings out There is an album by Canadian jazz pianist Paul Bley recorded in September 1991 and released on ECM two years later. The quartet features rhythm section Gary Peacock and Tony Oxley and reed player John Surman.

== Reception ==
Professional ratings
Review scores
Source	Rating
AllMusic	3/5 stars
The Penguin Guide to Jazz	3.5/4 stars

The AllMusic review by David R. Adler stated: "This is a remarkable encounter between four top-notch musicians... Although the record falls solidly within the "free jazz" category, it has a mysteriously soothing, meditative quality. Fans of these four greats shouldn't miss it."

The Penguin Guide to Jazz wrote: "The music is entirely collaborative and there are solo tracks, duos, and trios, with only one substantial group track, so the emphasis is on intimate communication across small but significant musical distances."

== Track listing ==
All compositions by Paul Bley except as indicated

1. "Afterthoughts" - 4:05
2. "Portrait of a Silence" (Gary Peacock) - 5:58
3. "Soft Touch" (Bley, Tony Oxley) - 3:42
4. "Speak Easy" (Oxley, Peacock) - 2:47
5. "Interface" (Bley, Oxley, Peacock, John Surman) - 5:22
6. "Alignment" (Surman) - 3:50
7. "Fair Share" (Bley, Peacock) - 6:03
8. "Article Four" (Surman) - 8:28
9. "Married Alive" - 4:17
10. "Spe-cu-lay-ting" (Bley, Oxley) - 1:26
11. "Tomorrow Today" (Peacock) - 2:19
12. "Note Police" - 7:54

== Personnel ==
- Paul Bley – piano
- John Surman – baritone saxophone, bass clarinet
- Gary Peacock – bass
- Tony Oxley – drums
