= Quiet Song =

Studio album by Paul Bley, Jimmy Giuffre & Bill Connors
- Released: 1975
- Recorded: November 14, 1974
- Studios: Generation Sound Studios, NYC
- Genre: Jazz
- Length: 32:26
- Label: Improvising Artists IAI 373839
- Producer: Paul Bley

Paul Bley chronology
Alone, Again (1975)	Quiet Song (1975)	Japan Suite (1976)

Quiet Song is an album by pianist Paul Bley, clarinetist Jimmy Giuffre and guitarist Bill Connors recorded in 1974 and released on Bley's own Improvising Artists label in 1975.

== Reception ==
Professional ratings
Review scores
Source	Rating
Allmusic	2.5/5 stars
The Penguin Guide to Jazz	3/4 stars
The Rolling Stone Jazz Record Guide	3/5 stars

Allmusic awarded the album 2½ stars noting "Although there are some interesting instrumental colors, much of the music rambles and wanders without much purpose and the results are rather inconclusive and slightly disappointing considering the talent involved". The Penguin Guide to Jazz said "Most of the pieces are improvised and most are thoughtful and introspective rather than dramatic".

== Track listing ==
1. "Solo" (Jimmy Giuffre) - 0:56
2. "Duet" (Bill Connors) - 4:35
3. "Play Blue" (Paul Bley) - 3:23
4. "Clarinet" (Jimmy Giuffre) - 0:52
5. "Yeah, Guitar" (Paul Bley) - 3:48
6. "Carol" (Paul Bley) -1:43
7. "Trio" (Paul Bley) -1:44
8. "Goodbye" (Gordon Jenkins) - 3:34
9. "Laurent" (Paul Bley) - 2:04
10. "Quiet Song" (Paul Bley) - 9:47

== Personnel ==
- Paul Bley - piano
- Jimmy Giuffre - clarinet, flute
- Bill Connors - guitar
