= Live at the Hilcrest Club 1958 =

1976 live album

Live album by Paul Bley, Ornette Coleman, Don Cherry, Charlie Haden and Billy Higgins
- Released: 1976
- Recorded: October 1958
- Venue: The Hillcrest Club, Los Angeles, California
- Genre: Jazz
- Length: 32:05
- Label: Inner City IC 1007

Paul Bley chronology
| Solemn Meditation (1958) | Live at the Hilcrest Club 1958 (1976) | Coleman Classics Volume 1 (1958) |

Live at the Hilcrest Club 1958 (originally released in 1970 by America Records as The Fabulous Paul Bley Quintet) is a live album by pianist Paul Bley, saxophonist Ornette Coleman, trumpeter Don Cherry, drummer Billy Higgins and bassist Charlie Haden recorded in California in 1958 and released on the Inner City label in 1976. The album was the first live recording of Ornette Coleman, made shortly after he recorded his first album, Something Else!!!! and featuring the group (without Bley) that would soon record the Atlantic albums The Shape of Jazz to Come (1959) and Change of the Century (1960).

== Reception ==
Professional ratings
Review scores
| Source | Rating |
|---|---|
| Allmusic | 4/5 stars |
| Christgau's Record Guide | A |
| The Penguin Guide to Jazz | 3.5/4 stars |
| The Rolling Stone Jazz Record Guide | 4/5 stars |

Village Voice critic Robert Christgau rated the album an "A" on its release observing: "I have the feeling when I want people to understand what free jazz meant, this is what I'll play". The Allmusic reviewer wrote: "The recording quality is decent for the period, and avant-garde collectors will want to search for this pioneering effort". According to The Penguin Guide to Jazz: "This is clearly an important record and, technical difficulties aside, it should be in all modern collections. However, it isn't central to Bley's recorded output".

== Track listing ==
All compositions by Ornette Coleman except as indicated

1. "Klactoveesedstene" (Charlie Parker) – 12:04
2. "I Remember Harlem" (Roy Eldridge) – 3:48
3. "The Blessing" – 9:35
4. "Free" – 5:39

== Personnel ==
- Paul Bley – piano
- Ornette Coleman – alto saxophone
- Don Cherry – cornet
- Charlie Haden – bass
- Billy Higgins – drums
