= The Life of a Trio: Sunday =

Studio album by Paul Bley, Jimmy Giuffre and Steve Swallow
- Released: 1990
- Recorded: December 17, 1989
- Studio: Sound on Sound Studio, NYC
- Genre: Jazz
- Length: 66:38
- Label: Owl; OWL060CD
- Producer: François Lemaire

Jimmy Giuffre chronology
The Life of a Trio: Saturday (1989)	The Life of a Trio: Sunday (1990)	River Station (1991)

Paul Bley chronology
The Life of a Trio: Saturday (1989)	The Life of a Trio: Sunday (1989)	Partners (1989)

The Life of a Trio: Sunday is an album reuniting the Jimmy Giuffre 3, pianist Paul Bley, saxophonist Jimmy Giuffre and bassist Steve Swallow which was released on the French Owl label in 1990.

== Reception ==
Professional ratings
Review scores
Source	Rating
Allmusic	4/5 stars
All About Jazz	4.5/5 stars
The Penguin Guide to Jazz Recordings	3.5/4 stars

Allmusic awarded the album 4 stars stating "The joy of music-making and the inherent lyricism in these pieces reflect not only a sense of familiarity with the dialogue and improvisational feel of each player, but the true desire to communicate from inside the sound being explored to the listener as well. There may have been a few more viscerally exciting performances by vanguard jazz trios during 1989, but few of them that revealed – via the strength of restraint – what tonality, dissonance, and harmony can achieve when what is explored is music for its own sake. Highly recommended". Matthew Miller on All About Jazz stated "Older, wiser and still stunningly in tune with each other, the threesome take up where they left off and the resulting double-disc of music is every bit as riveting as the original".

== Track listing ==
1. Sensing (Jimmy Giuffre) – 4:12
2. Monique (Paul Bley) – 3:25
3. The Giant Guitar and the Black Stick (Giuffre, Steve Swallow) – 5:58
4. Industrial Suite (Bley, Giuffre, Swallow) – 3:15
5. Sanctuary Much (Bley, Swallow) – 3:47
6. Tango del Mar (Bley, Giuffre, Swallow) – 5:32
7. The Hidden Voice (Giuffre) – 3:06
8. Mephisto (Bley) – 4:04
9. Where Were We? (Carla Bley) – 4:50
10. Sweet Song (Bley, Giuffre) – 3:25
11. Scrambled Legs (Bley, Swallow) – 2:02
12. Play Ball (Swallow) – 7:45
13. Fallen Statue (Bley, Swallow) – 1:25
14. Things (Bley, Swallow) – 3:35
15. Two Singers (Giuffre, Swallow) – 3:52
16. The Life of a Trio (Bley, Giuffre, Swallow) – 6:25

== Personnel ==
- Jimmy Giuffre – soprano saxophone, clarinet (tracks 1, 3, 4, 6, 7, 9, 10, 12, 13, 15, 16)
- Paul Bley – piano (tracks: 1, 2, 4–6, 8–14 & 16)
- Steve Swallow – electric bass (tracks: 1, 3–6, 9, 11, 12 & 14–16)
