= Alone, Again =

Studio album by Paul Bley
- Released: 1975
- Recorded: August 8–9, 1974
- Studios: Bendiksen Studio, Oslo
- Genre: Jazz
- Length: 36:56
- Label: Improvising Artists IAI 373840
- Producer: Paul Bley

Paul Bley chronology
Jaco (1975)	Alone, Again (1975)	Quiet Song (1975)

Alone, Again is a solo piano album by Paul Bley, recorded in Norway in 1974 and released on Bley's own Improvising Artists label in 1975.

== Reception ==
Professional ratings
Review scores
Source	Rating
AllMusic	3/5 stars
The Rolling Stone Jazz Record Guide	3/5 stars

Allmusic awarded the album 3 stars noting "Bley stayed mainly in the piano's center, creating nimble melodies, working off them and crafting alternate directions or intriguing counterpoints. It was intellectual, occasionally stiff, but never dull or detached".

== Track listing ==
All compositions by Paul Bley except where noted.

1. "Olhos de Gato" (Carla Bley) - 4:29
2. "Ballade" - 5:54
3. "And Now the Queen" (Carla Bley) - 3:06
4. "Glad" - 5:08
5. "Lovers" - 5:34
6. "Dreams" (Annette Peacock) - 5:57
7. "Explanations" - 6:48

== Personnel ==
- Paul Bley - piano
