= Barrage (Paul Bley album) =

Studio album by Paul Bley Quintet
- Released: 1965
- Recorded: October 20, 1964
- Studio: New York City
- Genre: Jazz
- Length: 29:27
- Label: ESP-Disk
- Producer: Fred Mendelsohn

Paul Bley chronology
Footloose! (1963)	Barrage (1965)	Touching (1965)

Barrage is the fifth album led by jazz pianist Paul Bley. The album was recorded by Bley's quintet in 1964, released by ESP-Disk, and features saxophonist Marshall Allen in a rare appearance outside the band of Sun Ra.

== Reception ==
Professional ratings
Review scores
Source	Rating
Allmusic	4/5 stars
The Penguin Guide to Jazz	3.5/4 stars
The Rolling Stone Jazz Record Guide	3/5 stars
DownBeat	2.5/5 stars

Allmusic gave the album four stars, calling it "a lost free jazz classic". Reviewing the 2009 re-release, All About Jazz stated "Barrage is a gem from the ESP-Disk archives; an important document in the progress of contemporary music, as fresh today as the day it was first performed" The Penguin Guide to Jazz said, "much of the interest in the album, which like its successor consists entirely of Carla Bley tunes, is in hearing Johnson and Allen in a small group context. The music is fairly hard-edged and the presence of two such confrontational players (the trumpeter was to appear on Coltrane's Ascension) gives the set an uncomfortable fiery complexion that tends to singe away its more subtle moments".

== Track listing ==
All compositions by Carla Bley

1. "Batterie" - 4:19
2. "Ictus" - 5:24
3. "And Now the Queen" - 4:21
4. "Around Again" - 4:15
5. "Walking Woman" - 4:18
6. "Barrage" - 5:31

== Personnel ==
- Paul Bley – piano
- Dewey Johnson – trumpet
- Marshall Allen – alto saxophone
- Eddie Gómez – double bass
- Milford Graves – percussion
