= Nothing to Declare (Paul Bley album) =

Studio album by Paul Bley
- Released: April 27, 2004
- Recorded: May 16, 2003
- Studio: Sound On Sound, NYC
- Genre: Jazz
- Length: 57:16
- Label: Justin Time JUST 199-2
- Producer: Jim West

Paul Bley chronology
Solo in Mondsee (2001)	Nothing to Declare (2004)	About Time (2007)

Nothing to Declare is a solo album by pianist Paul Bley recorded in 2003 and released on the Justin Time label in 2004.

== Reception ==
Professional ratings
Review scores
Source	Rating
Allmusic	3.5/5 stars
Jazz Review	5/5 stars
The Penguin Guide to Jazz Recordings	4/4 stars

The Allmusic review by Thom Jurek awarded the album 3½ stars, stating: "In all, Nothing to Declare is Bley's best outing for Justin Time thus far. It's simple in its presentation, but labyrinthine in its journeys". All About Jazz said: "Bley's lyricism has never been blunt or simplistic, and Nothing to Declare is nothing to be glossed over with a superficial listen, but it's sufficiently natural that the spontaneous leaps in logic make good sense". Jazz Review noted: "Nothing To Declare, while implying an international theme with its allusion to customs procedures, in fact refers to American standards and blues throughout the CD. Perhaps "nothing to declare" suggests disarming false humility, when the pianist and the listener know full well that Bley has a lot to declare and has been making important musical declarations for half a century."

== Track listing ==
All compositions by Paul Bley

1. "Nothing to Declare" - 18:39
2. "Breakdown" - 15:47
3. "Blues Waltz" - 14:15
4. "8th Avenue" - 8:35

== Personnel ==
- Paul Bley – piano
