= The Life of a Trio: Saturday =

Studio album by Paul Bley, Jimmy Giuffre and Steve Swallow
- Released: 1990
- Recorded: December 16, 1989
- Studio: Sound on Sound Studio, NYC
- Genre: Jazz
- Length: 45:59
- Label: Owl; OWL059CD
- Producer: François Lemaire

Jimmy Giuffre chronology
Liquid Dancers (1989)	The Life of a Trio: Saturday (1990)	The Life of a Trio: Sunday (1989)

Paul Bley chronology
Rejoicing (1989)	The Life of a Trio: Saturday (1989)	The Life of a Trio: Sunday (1989)

The Life of a Trio: Saturday is an album reuniting the Jimmy Giuffre 3—pianist Paul Bley, saxophonist Jimmy Giuffre and bassist Steve Swallow—released on the French Owl label in 1990. The album was released in the US on Sunnyside Records in 2003.

== Reception ==
Professional ratings
Review scores
Source	Rating
All About Jazz	4.5/5 stars
AllMusic	3.5/5 stars
The Penguin Guide to Jazz Recordings	4/4 stars

AllMusic stated that "time seems to be stripped away, and the microtonal and pointillistic investigations in collective improvisation embarked upon nearly three decades previously are as current as the next breath ... And indeed they are, as there were no rehearsals, no extra or alternate takes, nothing but the music as it happened ... What comes out is an investigation of sound from the inside out, textually, tonally, spatially. Extraordinary". Matthew Miller on All About Jazz stated: "Older, wiser and still stunningly in tune with each other, the threesome take up where they left off and the resulting double-disc of music is every bit as riveting as the original".

== Track listing ==
1. "Clarinet Zone" (Jimmy Giuffre) – 1:24
2. "Black Ivory" (Paul Bley, Giuffre) – 4:29
3. "Owl Eyes" (Bley) – 5:31
4. "Endless Melody" (Bley, Steve Swallow) – 3:08
5. "Turns" (Giuffre) – 5:27
6. "Foreplay" (Bley) – 3:06
7. "We Agree" (Giuffre, Swallow) – 2:06
8. "Clusters" (Giuffre) – 7:03
9. "December" (Swallow) – 1:27
10. "Someone" (Giuffre) – 2:13
11. "Even Steven" (Bley) – 3:52
12. "By the Way:" (Swallow) – 6:14
  1. "Part 1" – 1:19
  2. "Part 2" – 4:50

== Personnel ==
- Jimmy Giuffre – soprano saxophone, clarinet (tracks 1, 2, 5, 7, 8, 10 & 12)
- Paul Bley – piano (tracks 2–6, 8, 11 & 12)
- Steve Swallow – electric bass (tracks 4, 5, 7–9, & 12)
