= Notes on Ornette =

Studio album by Paul Bley
- Released: May 5, 1998
- Recorded: September 1997
- Genre: Jazz
- Length: 61:04
- Label: SteepleChase SCCD 31437
- Producer: Nils Winther

Paul Bley chronology
Out of Nowhere (1997)	Notes on Ornette (1998)	Not Two, Not One (1998)

Professional ratings
Review scores
Source	Rating
The Penguin Guide to Jazz Recordings	3.5/4 stars
Tom Hull	B+

Notes on Ornette is an album by pianist Paul Bley recorded in 1997 and released on the Danish SteepleChase label.

== Reception ==
All About Jazz said "Bley, at times, can be a brooding musician, although the more carefree exuberance of be-bop is not a foreign concept to him. Here with Notes on Ornette, the darker aspects of Bley’s musical personality suits the pointed and slightly melancholy nature of Coleman’s work... Another fine item to be added to Bley’s list of SteepleChase classics, this set not only speaks to this trio’s collective veracity but also to Coleman’s enduring genius as a writer. In fact, I’m sure the composer would be proud." JazzTimes observed "There have been so many Bley records over the last 20-odd years that only diehards try to keep up with all of them, but anyone who has ever enjoyed the pianist should seek out Notes on Ornette. Bley still enjoys throwing seemingly unrelated bits of improvised melody together, but here he often goes to the other extreme, spinning out lines that seem endless in which a few simple ideas continually transmogrify."

== Track listing ==
All compositions by Ornette Coleman except as indicated

1. "Turnaround" – 12:06
2. "Lorraine" – 10:03
3. "Crossroads" – 5:51
4. "When Will The Blues Leave" – 6:43
5. "Compassion" – 9:34
6. "Rejoicing" – 10:38
7. "Aarp" (Paul Bley) – 5:54

== Personnel ==
- Paul Bley – piano
- Jay Anderson – bass
- Jeff Hirshfield – drums
