= Tales of Another =

Studio album by Gary Peacock
- Released: 1977
- Recorded: February 2, 1977
- Studio: Generation Sound; New York City
- Genre: Jazz
- Length: 48:30
- Label: ECM 1101 ST
- Producer: Manfred Eicher

Gary Peacock chronology
| Voices (1971) | Tales of Another (1977) | December Poems (1979) |

Standards Trio chronology
| Tales of Another (1977) | Standards, Vol. 1 (1983) |

Tales of Another is an album by American bassist Gary Peacock, recorded on February 2, 1977, and released on ECM later that year. The trio features pianist Keith Jarrett and drummer Jack DeJohnette—the first recording by the group later known as Jarrett's Standards Trio.

== Background ==
DeJohnette recalled: "We... came together as a result of Gary's record date... He wanted Keith and I to join him on that. And then after that Manfred [Eicher] suggested to Keith that maybe we should form a trio. So we had a meeting to talk about the music, and we decided we'd play standards, so that it wouldn't be like a 'band'—we'd have flexibility, using the standards as a satellite jumping-off point." Despite the musicians' enthusiasm, the trio did not record together again until January 1983, when they gathered for the session that produced Standards, Vol. 1, Standards, Vol. 2, and Changes.

Peacock later recalled his satisfaction with the session: "It was a real eye-opener for me, because I was thinking—"Am I going to have to explain what to do and tell them this and that?... It was such a relief to say to someone, 'Just do whatever comes next', and know that person understands what you're saying from a musical point—not an intellectual point—actually understands it and says 'OK'."

== Reception ==
Professional ratings
Review scores
| Source | Rating |
|---|---|
| AllMusic | 4/5 stars |
| The Penguin Guide to Jazz Recordings | 3.5/4 stars |
| The Rolling Stone Jazz Record Guide | 4/5 stars |

The AllMusic review by Scott Yanow stated: "These musicians (who are equals) have played together many times through the years and their support of each other and close communication during these advanced improvisations is quite impressive. It's a good example of Peacock's music".

The authors of The Penguin Guide to Jazz commented: "there is a wonderful coherence to his solo work... which quashes any suggestion that this is another Jarrett album, politely or generously reattributed... the pianist is clearly at home with Peacock's music and there is a level of intuition at work which became the basis of their later standards performances."

Jarrett biographer Ian Carr called the recording "one of the classic albums of the 1970s," and wrote: "Even on this first meeting, the trio has an almost mystical rapport and there is a joy and vivacity in the whole performance which seems to make the music glow... the music has a vital maturity and youthfulness."

== Track listing ==
All compositions by Gary Peacock

1. "Vignette" - 7:06
2. "Tone Field" - 7:58
3. "Major Major" - 9:05
4. "Trilogy, No. 1" - 8:34
5. "Trilogy, No. 2" - 9:46
6. "Trilogy, No. 3" - 6:20

== Personnel ==
- Gary Peacock – bass
- Keith Jarrett – piano
- Jack DeJohnette – drums
