= Axis (Paul Bley album) =

Live album by Paul Bley
- Released: 1978
- Recorded: July 1–3, 1977; Axis in Soho, NYC
- Genre: Jazz
- Length: 30:15
- Label: Improvising Artists IAI 373853
- Producer: Paul Bley

Paul Bley chronology
Pyramid (1977)	Axis (1978)	Tears (1983)

Axis is a live solo album by pianist Paul Bley recorded in New York in 1977 and released on Bley's own Improvising Artists label the following year.

== Reception ==
Professional ratings
Review scores
Source	Rating
Allmusic	4.5/5 stars
The Penguin Guide to Jazz	3/4 stars
The Rolling Stone Jazz Record Guide	4/5 stars

Allmusic awarded the album 4½ stars stating "This is one of Bley's most painterly and moving solo dates". The Penguin Guide to Jazz called it "a meditative and in some ways rather melancholy set" and "an intriguing blend of styles and ideas".

== Track listing ==
All compositions by Paul Bley except as indicated

1. "Axis" - 16:01
2. "Porgy" (George Gershwin) - 3:38
3. "Music Matador" (Prince Lasha) - 4:48
4. "El Cordobes-Please Don't Ever Leave Me" - 5:48

== Personnel ==
- Paul Bley - piano
