= Paul Bley with Gary Peacock =

Studio album by Paul Bley with Gary Peacock
- Released: 1970
- Recorded: 1964; 1968
- Studio: New York City
- Genre: Jazz
- Length: 31:51
- Label: ECM; ECM 1003 ST
- Producer: Manfred Eicher

Paul Bley chronology
Turning Point (1964-68)	Paul Bley with Gary Peacock (1970)	Ballads (1971)

Paul Bley with Gary Peacock is an album by Canadian jazz pianist Paul Bley with American bassist Gary Peacock recorded in two sessions on 1964 and 1968 and released on ECM in December 1970. The sessions' trios feature drummers Paul Motian and Billy Elgart, respectively.

== Reception ==
The AllMusic review by David R. Adler awarded the album 3 stars stating "There's a curiously straight-ahead, tempo-driven feel to this short and sweet disc... The brittle, lo-fi sound doesn't detract from the album's historical value."

The Penguin Guide to Jazz said "There are good things, too, from what was to be Bley's established trio. Up until that point most of the trio's best work seems to have gone unrecorded."

Professional ratings
Review scores
Source	Rating
AllMusic	3/5 stars
The Penguin Guide to Jazz	3/4 stars

== Track listing ==
All tracks are written by Paul Bley except as indicated

Side I
No.	Title	Writer(s)	Date recorded	Length
1.	"Blues"	Ornette Coleman	1964	4:25
2.	"Getting Started"		1964	4:26
3.	"When Will the Blues Leave?"	Coleman	1964	3:54
4.	"Long Ago (and Far Away)"	Ira Gershwin; Jerome Kern	1964	4:18

Side II
No.	Title	Writer(s)	Date recorded	Length
1.	"Moor"	Gary Peacock	1964	3:29
2.	"Gary"	Annette Peacock	1968	4:42
3.	"Big Foot"		1968	3:27
4.	"Albert's Love Theme"	Annette Peacock	1968	4:53

== Personnel ==
=== Musicians ===
==== 1964 ====
- Paul Bley – piano
- Gary Peacock – bass
- Paul Motian – drums

==== 1968 ====
- Paul Bley – piano
- Gary Peacock – bass
- Billy Elgart – drums

=== Technical personnel ===
- Manfred Eicher – producer
- B & B Wojirsch – artwork
- Hans Harzheim – photography
