= Pyramid (Lee Konitz album) =

Studio album by Lee Konitz, Paul Bley and Bill Connors
- Released: 1977
- Recorded: June 11, 1977
- Studio: Electric Lady Studios, NYC
- Genre: Jazz
- Length: 35:44
- Label: Improvising Artists; IAI 37.38.45
- Producer: Paul Bley

Lee Konitz chronology
Figure & Spirit (1976)	Pyramid (1977)	The Lee Konitz Quintet (1977)

Paul Bley chronology
Japan Suite (1976)	Pyramid (1977)	Axis (1977)

Bill Connors chronology
Theme to the Gaurdian (1975)	Pyramid (1977)	Of Mist and Melting (1977)

Pyramid is an album by American jazz saxophonist Lee Konitz, pianist Paul Bley and guitarist Bill Connors recorded in 1977 and released on Bley's Improvising Artists label.

== Critical reception ==
Professional ratings
Review scores
Source	Rating
Allmusic	2/5 stars
The Rolling Stone Jazz Record Guide	3/5 stars

Scott Yanow on Allmusic said "due to the free nature of the pieces, the music is less exciting than one might hope. Everyone takes chances in their solos but several of the pieces wander on much too long. Overall this session does not reach the heights one might expect from these great players".

== Track listing ==
All compositions by Lee Konitz except where noted.

1. "Pyramid" (Bill Connors) – 4:05
2. "Out There" – 10:45
3. "Talk to Me" (Connors) – 2:47
4. "Tavia" – 4:32
5. "Longer Than You Know" (Paul Bley) – 4:13
6. "Play Blue" (Bley) – 9:22

== Personnel ==
- Lee Konitz – alto saxophone, soprano saxophone
- Paul Bley – piano, electric piano
- Bill Connors – electric guitar, acoustic guitar
