= Guamba =

Studio album by Gary Peacock
- Released: 1987
- Recorded: March 1987
- Genre: Jazz
- Length: 44:22
- Label: ECM
- Producer: Manfred Eicher

Gary Peacock chronology
Voice from the Past – Paradigm (1982)	Guamba (1987)	Partners (1989)

Guamba is an album by American jazz bassist Gary Peacock, with saxophonist Jan Garbarek, trumpeter Palle Mikkelborg, and drummer Peter Erskine, recorded in 1987 and released on the ECM label.

== Reception ==
The Allmusic review by Ron Wynn awarded the album 4 stars stating "Good late '80s session... The only defect comes from ECM's occasional tendency to introduce New Age themes and production values into the mix".

Professional ratings
Review scores
Source	Rating
Allmusic	4/5 stars
The Penguin Guide to Jazz Recordings	3/4 stars
Tom Hull – on the Web	B+

== Track listing ==
All compositions by Gary Peacock except as indicated

1. "Guamba" - 3:09
2. "Requiem" - 7:10
3. "Celina" - 4:13
4. "Thyme Time" (Peter Erskine, Gary Peacock) - 5:25
5. "Lila" - 13:04
6. "Introending" - 3:43
7. "Gardenia" - 8:07

- Recorded at Rainbow Studio in Oslo, Norway in March 1987.

== Personnel ==
- Gary Peacock — bass
- Jan Garbarek — tenor saxophone, soprano saxophone
- Palle Mikkelborg — trumpet, flugelhorn
- Peter Erskine — drums
