= BeBopBeBopBeBopBeBop =

Studio album by Paul Bley Trio
- Released: 1990
- Recorded: December 22, 1989; Copenhagen, Denmark
- Genre: Jazz
- Length: 63:08
- Label: SteepleChase SCS 1259
- Producer: Nils Winther

Paul Bley chronology
Partners (1989)	BeBopBeBopBeBopBeBop (1990)	Memoirs (1990)

BeBopBeBopBeBopBeBop (sometimes simply referred to as BeBop) is an album of bebop standards by pianist Paul Bley recorded in Denmark in 1989 and released on the SteepleChase label.

== Reception ==
Professional ratings
Review scores
Source	Rating
Allmusic	4/5 stars
The Penguin Guide to Jazz	4/4 stars

Allmusic awarded the album 4 stars calling it "A surprising album from Bley, long considered an outside player with little, if any, affinity for straight bop. He shatters that myth on this set". The Penguin Guide to Jazz said "Bebop is a taxingly inventive and constantly surprising run through a dozen kenspeckle bop tunes".

== Track listing ==
1. "Now's the Time" (Charlie Parker) – 4:40
2. "My Little Suede Shoes" (Parker) – 7:47
3. "Ornithology" (Parker) – 7:06
4. "A Night in Tunisia" (Dizzy Gillespie) – 4:23
5. "Don't Blame Me" (Dorothy Fields, Jimmy McHugh) – 6:29 Bonus track on CD
6. "The Theme" (Traditional) – 7:35 Bonus track on CD
7. "Bebop" (Gillespie) – 2:38
8. "Lady Bird" (Tadd Dameron) – 6:32
9. "Tenderly" (Walter Gross, Jack Lawrence) – 4:37
10. "Steeplechase" (Parker) – 3:14
11. "Barbados" (Parker) – 3:52
12. "52nd Street Theme" (Thelonious Monk) – 3:41

== Personnel ==
- Paul Bley – piano
- Bob Cranshaw – bass
- Keith Copeland – drums
