= Life Time (Tony Williams album) =

Studio album by Tony Williams
- Released: January 1965
- Recorded: August 21 & 24, 1964
- Studio: Van Gelder, Englewood Cliffs, NJ
- Genre: Jazz
- Length: 38:25
- Label: Blue Note; BST 84180
- Producer: Alfred Lion

Tony Williams chronology
Life Time (1965)	Spring (1965)

Life Time is the debut album by American drummer Tony Williams, recorded in 1964 and released on the Blue Note label. Featured musicians include tenor saxophonist Sam Rivers, vibraphonist Bobby Hutcherson, pianist Herbie Hancock and bassists Ron Carter, Gary Peacock, and Richard Davis.

== Reception ==
Professional ratings
Review scores
Source	Rating
AllMusic	4.5/5 stars
The Penguin Guide to Jazz Recordings	3.5/4 stars

The AllMusic review by Scott Yanow stated: "The unpredictable music holds one's interest; a very strong debut for the masterful drummer".

The Penguin Guide to Jazz Recordings included the album in its suggested “core collection” of essential recordings.

== Track listing ==
All compositions by Tony Williams.

1. "Two Pieces of One: Red" – 8:06
2. "Two Pieces of One: Green" – 10:40
3. "Tomorrow Afternoon" – 5:35
4. "Memory" – 8:06
5. "Barb's Song to the Wizard" – 5:58

Recorded on August 21 (1–3) and August 24 (4–5), 1964.

== Personnel ==
- Tony Williams – drums, timpani, woodblocks, maracas, triangle (1–4)
- Sam Rivers – tenor saxophone (1–3)
- Bobby Hutcherson – vibes, marimba (4)
- Herbie Hancock – piano (4–5)
- Ron Carter (5), Richard Davis (1–2), Gary Peacock (1–3) – bass
