= Shift in the Wind =

Studio album by Gary Peacock
- Released: 1980
- Recorded: February 1980
- Studio: Columbia Recording Studios; New York City
- Genre: Jazz
- Length: 47:10
- Label: ECM 1165
- Producer: Manfred Eicher

Gary Peacock chronology
December Poems (1979)	Shift in the Wind (1980)	Voice from the Past – Paradigm (1982)

Shift in the Wind is an album by American jazz bassist Gary Peacock recorded in February 1980 and released on ECM later that year. The trio features pianist Art Lande and drummer Eliot Zigmund.

== Reception ==
The AllMusic review by Scott Yanow stated: "The interplay between these masterful musicians is more significant than the actual compositions and rewards repeated listenings."

Professional ratings
Review scores
Source	Rating
AllMusic	4/5 stars
The Penguin Guide to Jazz Recordings	2.5/4 stars
The Rolling Stone Jazz Record Guide	3/5 stars
Tom Hull – on the Web	B+

== Track listing ==
All compositions by Gary Peacock except as indicated

1. "So Green" (Art Lande) - 6:15
2. "Fractions" (Art Lande, Gary Peacock, Eliot Zigmund) - 5:03
3. "Last First" - 8:15
4. "Shift in the Wind" - 5:51
5. "Centers" (Lande, Peacock, Zigmund) - 6:56
6. "Caverns Beneath the Zoth" (Lande) - 10:01
7. "Valentine" - 5:10

== Personnel ==
- Gary Peacock – bass
- Art Lande – piano
- Eliot Zigmund – drums
