= Voice from the Past – Paradigm =

Voice from the Past – PARADIGM

Studio album by Gary Peacock
- Released: 1982
- Recorded: August 1981
- Studio: Talent Studio; Oslo, Norway
- Genre: Avant-garde jazz
- Length: 49:22
- Label: ECM; ECM 1210
- Producer: Manfred Eicher

Gary Peacock chronology
Shift in the Wind (1980)	Voice from the Past – PARADIGM (1982)	Guamba (1987)

Voice from the Past – PARADIGM is an album by American jazz bassist Gary Peacock, recorded in August 1981 and released on ECM the following year. The quartet features saxophonist Jan Garbarek, trumpeter Tomasz Stańko, and drummer Jack DeJohnette.

== Reception ==
The AllMusic review by David R. Adler stated: "The interplay between Peacock and DeJohnette, captured roughly two years before the release of the first Keith Jarrett standards record, is especially interesting. One only wishes the horns weren't so tinny."

Professional ratings
Review scores
Source	Rating
AllMusic	3/5 stars
The Penguin Guide to Jazz Recordings	3/4 stars
The Rolling Stone Jazz Record Guide	3/5 stars
Tom Hull – on the Web	B+

== Track listing ==
All tracks are written by Gary Peacock.

Side I
No.	Title	Length
1.	"Voice from the Past"	11:00
2.	"Legends"	7:40
3.	"Moor"	4:58

Side II
No.	Title	Length
1.	"Allegory"	9:35
2.	"Paradigm"	6:44
3.	"Ode for Tomten"	9:25

== Personnel ==
- Gary Peacock – bass
- Jan Garbarek – tenor and soprano saxophones
- Tomasz Stańko – trumpet
- Jack DeJohnette – drums
