= Essence (Don Ellis album) =

Studio album by Don Ellis
- Released: 1962
- Recorded: July 15–17, 1962
- Studio: Los Angeles, California
- Genre: Jazz
- Length: 45:07
- Label: Pacific Jazz; PJ/PJS 55
- Producer: Richard Bock

Don Ellis chronology
New Ideas (1961)	Essence (1962)	Jazz Jamboree 1962 (1962)

Essence is an album by trumpeter Don Ellis recorded in 1962 and released on the Pacific Jazz label.

== Reception ==
Professional ratings
Review scores
Source	Rating
Down Beat	4.5/5 stars
Allmusic	4/5 stars
The Penguin Guide to Jazz	3.5/4 stars

Reviewed in the January 3, 1963 issue of Down Beat magazine, jazz critic Richard B. Hadlock said that "Over and over throughout the 44 remarkable minutes of this recording the force of Ellis' extraordinary musicianship makes itself felt. Indeed, at times his complete mastery of the horn almost seems to get in the way. But this is a brilliant young musician with original ideas to offer..."

The AllMusic site awarded the album four stars stating "Ellis, who sought during this period to transfer ideas and concepts from modern classical music into adventurous jazz, often experimented with time, tempos and the use of space while still swinging... This is thought-provoking music that was certainly way overdue to be reissued." The Penguin Guide to Jazz said "The group is a fine one; even the little-known drummers play with authority and seem equal to Ellis's developing rhythmic obsessions. ...Bley is fascinating and Peacock his usual authoritative self."

== Track listing ==
All compositions by Don Ellis except as indicated

1. "Johnny Come Lately" (Billy Strayhorn) - 4:57
2. "Slow Space" - 4:36
3. "Ostinato" - 7:35
4. "Donkey" (Carla Bley) - 4:39
5. "Form" - 10:15
6. "Angel Eyes" (Earl Brent, Matt Dennis) - 4:26
7. "Irony" - 5:16
8. "Lover" (Richard Rodgers, Lorenz Hart) - 3:23

== Personnel ==
- Don Ellis - trumpet
- Paul Bley - piano
- Gary Peacock - bass
- Nick Martinis, Gene Stone - drums
