= Caravan Suite =

Studio album by Paul Bley
- Released: 1993
- Recorded: April 18, 1992
- Studio: SteepleChase Digital Studio, Copenhagen, Denmark
- Genre: Jazz
- Length: 56:02
- Label: SteepleChase SCCD 31316
- Producer: Nils Winther

Paul Bley chronology
Annette (1992)	Caravan Suite (1993)	Homage To Carla (1992)

Caravan Suite is an album of compositions by Duke Ellington performed by pianist Paul Bley which was recorded in Denmark in 1992 and released on the SteepleChase label.

== Reception ==
Professional ratings
Review scores
Source	Rating
The Penguin Guide to Jazz	3.5/4 stars

The Penguin Guide to Jazz wrote that the "piano is very crisp and exact, suiting the material admirably."

== Track listing ==
All compositions by Duke Ellington

1. "Caravan Suite:" – 32:57
  1. "Section 1" – 7:21
  2. "Section 2" – 7:40
  3. "Section 3" – 8:55
  4. "Section 4" – 7:02
2. "I Got It Bad (and That Ain't Good)" – 7:30
3. "(In My) Solitude" – 11:06
4. "I'm Beginning to See the Light" – 6:17

== Personnel ==
- Paul Bley – piano
