= Paul Plays Carla =

Studio album by Paul Bley Trio
- Released: 1992
- Recorded: December 1991; SteepleChase Digital Studio in Copenhagen, Denmark
- Genre: Jazz
- Length: 66:40
- Label: SteepleChase SCCD 31303
- Producer: Nils Winther

Paul Bley chronology
In the Evenings Out There (1991)	Paul Plays Carla (1992)	Mindset (1992)

Paul Plays Carla (sometimes referred to as Paul Bley Plays Carla Bley) is an album of Carla Bley's compositions performed by pianist Paul Bley which was recorded in Denmark in 1991 and released on the SteepleChase label.

== Reception ==
Professional ratings
Review scores
Source	Rating
Allmusic	4/5 stars
The Penguin Guide to Jazz Recordings	3.5/4 stars

Allmusic awarded the album 4 stars noting "The music falls somewhere between advanced bop and the avant-garde, often swinging but with surprising turns and twists and often-unusual chord sequences. An intriguing set".

== Track listing ==
All compositions by Carla Bley

1. "Vashkar" - 6:06
2. "Floater" - 4:40
3. "Seven" - 6:44
4. "Around Again" - 7:04
5. "Ida Lupino" - 7:29
6. "Turns" - 4:54
7. "And Now the Queen" - 6:23
8. "Ictus" - 7:28
9. "Olhos de Gato" - 7:44
10. "Donkey" - 8:08

== Personnel ==
- Paul Bley - piano
- Marc Johnson - bass
- Jeff Williams - drums
