= Modern Chant =

Studio album by Paul Bley Trio
- Released: November 25, 1994
- Recorded: September 17, 1994
- Studio: Masuo Studio, NYC
- Genre: Jazz
- Length: 51:48
- Label: Venus; TKCV-79074
- Producer: Todd Barkan

Paul Bley chronology
Chaos (1994)	Modern Chant (1994)	Emerald Blue (1994)

Modern Chant (subtitled Inspiration from Gregorian Chant) is an album by pianist Paul Bley, cellist David Eyges, and drummer Bruce Ditmas recorded in 1994 and released on the Japanese Venus label.

== Reception ==
Professional ratings
Review scores
Source	Rating
Allmusic	3/5 stars

The Allmusic review by Richard S. Ginell states "this enjoyable, offbeat trio album featuring the unusual combination of Bley's piano, David Eyges' electric cello and Bruce Ditmas' drums seems to have very little to do with Gregorian chant per se ... Only "Digitant" seems to breathe some of the ambience of chant in its thematic material. Eyges' cello usually fills in the traditional function of a bass—albeit a very light-toned bass—while occasionally forming dissonant arco (bowed) counterlines around the piano. Bley's playing is often brilliantly unpredictable, difficult to categorize, and thus, able to stand out from the pack". In JazzTimes Bill Bennett wrote "Bley is a fountain of ideas, sometimes suggesting divergent harmonic and melodic directions, sometimes reveling in the sound of a lone tone cluster ringing through the pulse. Eyges takes full advantage of the range of his instrument, moving between rhythmic and melodic contributions with grace and ingenuity. Ditmas respects the flexible time sense that Bley brings to bear, contributing texture and color as well as pulse to the proceedings".

== Track listing ==
All compositions by Paul Bley, David Eyges and Bruce Ditmas.

1. "The New You" - 3:59
2. "Sweet Talk" - 4:31
3. "Funhouse" - 5:34
4. "Please Don't" - 5:54
5. "Wisecracks" - 5:40
6. "Spot" - 3:43
7. "Russell" - 7:33
8. "Digitant" - 4:40
9. "Decompose" - 5:05
10. "Loose Change" - 5:09

== Personnel ==
- Paul Bley – piano
- David Eyges – electric cello
- Bruce Ditmas – drums
