= Spring (Tony Williams album) =

Studio album by Anthony Williams
- Released: 1966
- Recorded: August 12, 1965
- Studios: Van Gelder, Englewood Cliffs, NJ
- Genres: Avant-garde jazz, post-bop, modal jazz
- Length: 38:56
- Labels: Blue Note; BST 84216
- Producer: Alfred Lion

Anthony Williams chronology
Life Time (1964)	Spring (1966)	Emergency! (1969)

Spring is the second album by American drummer Tony Williams, recorded in 1965 and released on the Blue Note label. Williams is featured with tenor saxophonists Sam Rivers and Wayne Shorter, pianist Herbie Hancock and bassist Gary Peacock.

== Reception ==
The AllMusic review by Al Campbell stated: "Considering the extraordinary talent assembled for Tony Williams' second Blue Note date as a leader, this could have been a landmark session. Unfortunately, it's not. Spring isn't totally forgettable; on the contrary... However, the five Tony Williams compositions... often failed to provoke the musicians into reaching crucial unity, making Spring haphazard, falling short of the expected goal".

Professional ratings
Review scores
Source	Rating
AllMusic	3/5 stars
The Penguin Guide to Jazz Recordings	3.5/4 stars

== Track listing ==
All compositions by Anthony Williams

Side one

1. "Extras" – 8:10
2. "Echo" – 5:02
3. "From Before" – 6:50

Side two

1. "Love Song" – 8:25
2. "Tee" – 10:29

== Personnel ==
- Anthony Williams - drums
- Wayne Shorter (1, 3, 5) - tenor saxophone
- Sam Rivers (1, 3-5) - tenor saxophone
- Herbie Hancock - piano (3-5)
- Gary Peacock - bass (1 & 3-5)
