= Partners (Paul Bley & Gary Peacock album) =

Studio album by Paul Bley and Gary Peacock
- Released: 1991
- Recorded: December 18, 1989
- Studio: Sound on Sound Studio, NYC
- Genre: Jazz
- Length: 61:35
- Label: Owl OWL 058
- Producer: François Lemaire

Paul Bley chronology
The Life of a Trio: Sunday (1989)	Partners (1991)	BeBopBeBopBeBopBeBop (1989)

Gary Peacock chronology
Guamba (1987)	Partners (1989)	Oracle (1993)

Partners is an album by pianist Paul Bley and bassist Gary Peacock recorded in New York in 1989 and released on the French label Owl in 1991.

== Reception ==
Professional ratings
Review scores
Source	Rating
Allmusic	4/5 stars
The Penguin Guide to Jazz Recordings	3/4 stars

Allmusic awarded the album 4 stars stating "by the time this duo session was recorded, one could expect that a certain degree of musical empathy would be in play. And yes, here there is plenty of the give and take of two old friends who do not go along with the mainstream jazz program. Yet one could also call this an album of twin monologues, for ten of the 15 tracks here are solo improvisations for each player".

== Track listing ==
All compositions by Paul Bley and Gary Peacock except as indicated

1. "Again Anew" - 6:32
2. "Pleiades Skirt" (Peacock) - 2:12
3. "Octavon" (Bley) - 2:13
4. "Latin Genetics" (Ornette Coleman) - 5:07
5. "Workinoot" (Peacock) - 4:37
6. "Afternoon of a Dawn, Parts 1-3" (Bley) - 5:33
7. "Hand in Hand" - 4:44
8. "Satyr Satire" (Peacock) - 2:41
9. "Lull-A-Bye" (Bley) - 3:31
10. "Twitter Pat" (Peacock) - 1:35
11. "Who's Who Is It?" - 11:37
12. "Gently, Gently" (Peacock) - 2:11
13. "Majestique" (Bley) - 3:06
14. "Pot Luck" (Peacock) - 2:48
15. "No Pun Intended" - 3:08

== Personnel ==
- Paul Bley - piano
- Gary Peacock - bass
