= Jaco (album) =

Live album by Jaco Pastorius/Pat Metheny/Bruce Ditmas/Paul Bley
- Released: 1976
- Recorded: June 16, 1974
- Venues: 29 Greene Street, New York City 10013
- Studio: Blue Rock Studio
- Genre: Jazz
- Length: 36:36
- Label: Improvising Artists
- Producer: Paul Bley

Pat Metheny chronology
Jaco (1976)	Bright Size Life (1976)

Jaco Pastorius chronology
Jaco (1974)	Jaco Pastorius (1976)

Paul Bley chronology
Paul Bley/NHØP (1973)	Jaco (1974)	Alone, Again (1974)

Professional ratings
Review scores
Source	Rating
Allmusic	3/5 stars

Jaco is the unofficial later title of a 1974 LP album on Paul Bley's Improvising Artists Label. It is notable for being the first professional recording showcasing the talents of Jaco Pastorius and Pat Metheny. The two had become friends in Miami the year before. Their collaboration continued on Metheny's debut Bright Size Life with Bob Moses, recorded in December 1975.

== Track listing ==
Side one
No.	Title	Writer(s)	Length
1.	"Vashkar"	Carla Bley	9:55
2.	"Poconos"	Paul Bley	1:00
3.	"Donkey"	Carla Bley	6:28
Total length:			17:23

Side two
No.	Title	Writer(s)	Length
1.	"Vampira"	Paul Bley	7:15
2.	"Overtoned"	Carla Bley	1:04
3.	"Jaco"	Paul Bley	3:45
4.	"Batterie"	Carla Bley	5:12
5.	"King Korn"	Carla Bley	0:29
6.	"Blood"	Annette Peacock	1:28
Total length:			19:13 36:36

== Personnel ==
- Pat Metheny – guitar
- Jaco Pastorius – bass guitar
- Paul Bley – electric piano
- Bruce Ditmas – drums
