= Blues for Red =

Studio album by Paul Bley
- Released: 1989
- Recorded: May 1989
- Studio: Barigozzi Studio, Milan
- Genre: Jazz
- Length: 63:10
- Label: Red, RR 123238
- Producer: Sergio Veschi

Paul Bley chronology
The Nearness of You (1988)	Blues for Red (1989)	Rejoicing (1989)

Blues for Red is a solo piano album by Paul Bley recorded in Italy in 1989 and released on the Red label in 1992.

== Reception ==
Professional ratings
Review scores
Source	Rating
Allmusic	4/5 stars
The Penguin Guide to Jazz	3/4 stars

Allmusic awarded the album 4 stars, stating: "While this is not an album that would serve well as an introduction to this wonderful performer, it will prove particularly rewarding to those who are familiar with the pianist's work and wish to observe some different facets of his playing."

== Track listing ==
All compositions by Paul Bley

1. "Blues for Red" - 8:08
2. "Rear Projection" - 7:20
3. "Into the Night" - 5:24
4. "Above Board" - 5:50
5. "Delirious Boogie" - 6:06
6. "Underground" - 6:43
7. "Up Hill" - 4:14
8. "Latin Thing" - 5:24
9. "Downtown" - 6:24
10. "Late Night Blue" - 2:30
11. "Baby Narrows" - 4:08
12. "Capri - Cious" - 2:55
13. "Solo Mio" - 3:20
14. "Exit" - 0:50

== Personnel ==
- Paul Bley – piano
