= About Time (Paul Bley album) =

Studio album by Paul Bley
- Released: June 24, 2008
- Recorded: May 31, 2007
- Studios: Nola's Penthouse Sound Studios, New York City
- Genre: Jazz
- Length: 43:57
- Label: Justin Time
- Producer: Jim West

Paul Bley chronology
Solo in Mondsee (2007)	About Time (2008)	Play Blue: Oslo Concert (2014)

About Time is a solo album by pianist Paul Bley recorded in 2007 and released on the Justin Time label in 2008.

== Reception ==
Professional ratings
Review scores
Source	Rating
AllMusic	3.5/5 stars

In his review for AllMusic, Thom Jurek stated "About Time is a truly worthy and elegant statement from one of the true greats in the jazz piano lineage, and these intermittently released solo offerings of his are always worth the investment of time and money, because they open up visible but usually unnoticeable sound worlds to those who will open their ears and listen. Further, his work is never that of an artist who has arrived somewhere and remains on his plateau -- Paul Bley is always reaching for higher ground". All About Jazz said "The pianist lures the listener into his web as he blends technique into the expanse of his creativity. Space and time are worked into a melodic dance, atonality sings besides formal structure, and harmony strikes a rich chord. His time signatures are shaped on the go as a pensive interlude can turn into a lithe romp when he traverses tangents with agile lines... His artistry is upfront and center. With About Time it takes Bley less than 45 minutes to stamp his virtuosity".

== Track listing ==
All compositions by Paul Bley except as indicated

1. "About Time" - 33:32
2. "Pent-Up House" (Sonny Rollins) - 10:25

== Personnel ==
- Paul Bley – piano
