= Fragments (Paul Bley album) =

Studio album by Paul Bley
- Released: October 1986
- Recorded: January 1986
- Studio: Rainbow Studio; Oslo, Norway
- Genre: Jazz
- Length: 54:05
- Label: ECM 1320
- Producer: Manfred Eicher

Paul Bley chronology
| My Standard (1985) | Fragments (1986) | The Paul Bley Quartet (1987) |

Fragments is an album by Canadian jazz pianist Paul Bley recorded in January 1986 and released on ECM October later that year. The quartet features reed player John Surman, guitarist Bill Frisell, and drummer Paul Motian.

== Reception ==
Professional ratings
Review scores
| Source | Rating |
|---|---|
| AllMusic | 4/5 stars |
| The Penguin Guide to Jazz | 3/4 stars |

The AllMusic review by Stephen Cook awarded the album 4 stars, stating, "This 1986 session ranks high among his many solo and group outings for the label.... Overcast and a bit icy as one might expect, but nevertheless Bley's Fragments makes for a consistently provocative and enjoyable listen."

The Penguin Guide to Jazz states, "The writing and arranging are surprisingly below par and the recording isn't quite as clean as it might be".

== Track listing ==
All compositions by Paul Bley except as indicated

1. "Memories" – 7:26
2. "Monica Jane" (Bill Frisell) – 7:09
3. "Line Down" (John Surman) – 7:17
4. "Seven" (Carla Bley) – 5:44
5. "Closer" (Carla Bley) – 5:08
6. "Once Around the Park" (Paul Motian) – 6:40
7. "Hand Dance" – 2:54
8. "For the Love of Sarah" (Motian) – 5:46
9. "Nothing Ever Was, Anyway" (Annette Peacock) – 6:01

== Personnel ==
- Paul Bley – piano
- John Surman – baritone saxophone, soprano saxophone, bass clarinet
- Bill Frisell – guitar
- Paul Motian – drums
