= Play Blue: Oslo Concert =

Live album by Paul Bley
- Released: March 28, 2014
- Recorded: August 2008
- Venue: Oslo Jazzfestival; Oslo, Norway
- Genre: Jazz
- Length: 50:24
- Label: ECM 2373
- Producer: Manfred Eicher

Paul Bley chronology
| About Time (2008) | Play Blue: Oslo Concert (2014) | When will the blues leave? (2019) |

Play Blue: Oslo Concert is a live solo album by pianist Paul Bley recorded at the Oslo Jazzfestival in August 2008 and released on ECM in March 2014.

== Reception ==
Professional ratings
Review scores
| Source | Rating |
|---|---|
| The Guardian | 4/5 stars |
| The Buffalo News | 3/5 stars |
| Tom Hull | B+ |

JazzTimes stated "Hearing Bley in action, applying his own sense of order to various approaches, still feels electrifying."

The Guardian review by John Fordham awarded the album 4 stars noting "Expat Canadian piano star Paul Bley, the man with the vision to hire the unknown Ornette Coleman back in the 1950s, was 75 when this solo concert was recorded by ECM's Jan Erik Kongshaug and Manfred Eicher at the Oslo jazz festival—still exposing his profound knowledge of jazz to unflinching spontaneous reexamination."

The Buffalo News review said "Listen to this disc a few times, if you can. It’s a great jazz pianist playing for you how he was never pent up in anyone’s house in jazz—how he became a great and thorny and weirdly lovable jazz maverick in his old age, a kind of link between Bill Evans and Cecil Taylor."

All About Jazz enthused "Bley's music rambles. He never plays anything twice, not even on a fifteen or seventeen minute tune. Every second of his music is a voyage of discovery. On Play Blue he has created a profound and timeless beauty. A career highlight."

== Track listing ==
All compositions by Paul Bley except as indicated

1. "Far North" - 17:00
2. "Way Down South Suite" - 15:21
3. "Flame" - 7:47
4. "Longer" - 10:16
5. "Pent-up House" (Sonny Rollins) - 6:06

== Personnel ==
- Paul Bley – piano
