= Turning Point (Paul Bley album) =

Studio album by Paul Bley
- Released: 1975
- Recorded: March 9, 1964 and May 10, 1968
- Studio: Mirasound Studio, New York City and the University Of Washington, Seattle
- Genre: Jazz
- Length: 35:35
- Label: Improvising Artists IAI 373841
- Producer: Paul Bley

Paul Bley chronology
Mr. Joy (1968)	Turning Point (1975)	Paul Bley with Gary Peacock (1963–68)

Turning Point' is an album led by jazz pianist Paul Bley collecting studio recordings from 1964 and two concert recordings from 1968 which was released on Bley's own Improvising Artists label in 1975.

== Reception ==
Professional ratings
Review scores
Source	Rating
Allmusic	3/5 stars

Allmusic awarded the album 3 stars calling it "Very interesting if not quite essential music".

== Track listing ==
1. "Calls" (Carla Bley) - 6:10
2. "Turning" (Paul Bley) - 6:30
3. "King Korn" (Carla Bley) - 6:00
4. "Ictus" (Carla Bley) - 4:05
5. "Mr. Joy" (Annette Peacock) - 3:50
6. "Kid Dynamite" (Peacock) - 3:40
7. "Ida Lupino" (Carla Bley) - 5:20
- Recorded at Mirasound Studio, New York City on March 9, 1964 (tracks 1–4 & 7) and at the University of Washington in Seattle on May 10, 1968 (tracks 5 & 6)

== Personnel ==
- Paul Bley - piano
- John Gilmore - tenor saxophone (tracks 1–4 & 7)
- Gary Peacock - bass
- Billy Elgart (tracks 5 & 6), Paul Motian (tracks 1–4 & 7) - drums
