= Tears (Paul Bley album) =

Studio album by Paul Bley
- Released: 1984
- Recorded: May 19, 1983
- Studio: Studio Adyar, Paris, France
- Genre: Jazz
- Length: 37:46
- Label: Owl OWL 034
- Producer: Guy Van Minden & Jean-Jacques Pussiau

Paul Bley chronology
| Axis (1977) | Tears (1984) | Tango Palace (1983) |

Tears is a solo album by pianist Paul Bley recorded in France in 1983 and released on the French Owl label the following year.

== Reception ==
Professional ratings
Review scores
| Source | Rating |
|---|---|
| Allmusic | 4/5 stars |

Allmusic awarded the album 4 stars calling it "one of Paul Bley's solo piano masterworks".

== Track listing ==
All compositions by Paul Bley except as indicated

1. "Tears" - 6:31
2. "Ostinato" - 3:34
3. "Music Matador" (Prince Lasha, Sonny Simmons) - 5:07
4. "Walkman" - 4:00
5. "Flame" - 3:48
6. "Hardly" - 1:48
7. "Head Over Heels" - 5:16
8. "Solo Rose" - 3:40
9. "For Roy E." - 3:01

== Personnel ==
- Paul Bley - piano
