= Bruce Ditmas =

American jazz musician

Bruce Ditmas (born December 12, 1946) is an American jazz drummer and percussionist.

== Early life ==
Ditmas was born in Atlantic City, New Jersey on December 12, 1946, but grew up in Miami; his father was a trombonist in Miami big bands. Ditmas studied the piano from the age of nine and switched to the drums two years later. He studied with Tony Crisetello and then attended Stan Kenton clinics at Indiana University and Michigan State University in the early 1960s. He started playing with Ira Sullivan while still at high school, and continued until 1964.

== Later life and career ==
Ditmas accompanied singers including Judy Garland, Barbra Streisand, Della Reese, Leslie Uggams, and Sheila Jordan between 1964 and 1970. He moved to New York City in 1966 and often worked in the city thereafter, although he was based in Miami from 1970 to 1983.

In the 1970s Ditmas played in the pit orchestra for the Broadway show Promises, Promises. He was then with Joe Newman (1971), Jazz Interactions Orchestra (1971), Gil Evans (1971–77), Enrico Rava (from 1971), Stardrive, Atmospheres, and Future Shock (1972), New Wilderness Preservation Band (1972–73), Paul Bley, Lee Konitz, Chet Baker (1974–75), and Stan Getz (1975). Later in the 1970s he concentrated on solo performance, including experiments with drum machines. He returned to work with the Evans Orchestra from 1979 to 1985, and lived in Italy in 1986–87, where he played with Dino Saluzzi, Enrico Rava, Rita Marcotulli, and Pietro Tonolo. He played with his own trio D3 with Jack DeSalvo and Tony DeCicco from 1988, after returning to New York. D3 recorded Spontaneous Combustion for the Tutu label. In the 1990s he played with Pat Hall and Karl Berger among others. He often played drum synthesizers in the same decade. His 1995 album What If also featured saxophonist Sam Rivers, guitarist John Abercrombie, Bley on piano and synthesizers, and bassist Dominic Richards.

In 1990, Ditmas orchestrated the music to an opera by Patricia Burgess, The Dream of Four Directions. He has also composed prolifically for television and advertising; among his credits is the film Deathscape.

== Discography ==
=== As leader/co-leader ===
- Aeray Dust (Chiaroscuro Records, 1977)
- What If (Posctards, 1995)
- Synergy (In+Out, 1996)
- Out and Out Jazz (2001)
- Over the Edge (2011)
- Yellow Dust (2015)

=== As sideman ===
With Jaco Pastorius

- Jaco (Improvising Artists, 1974)

With Paul Bley

- Modern Chant (Venus, 1994)
- Emerald Blue (1994)

With Gil Evans

- Where Flamingos Fly (Artists House, 1971)
- Svengali (1973)
- The Gil Evans Orchestra Plays the Music of Jimi Hendrix (RCA, 1974)
- There Comes a Time (RCA, 1975)

With Enrico Rava

- Andanada (1983)
- Secrets (1986)
- Volver (ECM, 1986)

With others

- 1971 Katumbo (Dance), Johnny Coles (Mainstream)
- 1972 Steve Kuhn Live in New York, Steve Kuhn (Cobblestone)
- 1978 Futures Passed, David Friedman
- 1996 Live at Chene Park, Jean-Luc Ponty
- 1996 Music for the Millennium, Ralph Simon
- 1996 Songs from the Musical "Poker", Frank Lacy
- 1997 I Will, John Clark
- 2015 Homage to Paul Bley, Arrigo Cappelletti/Furio Di Castri

Main source:
