= Basics (Paul Bley album) =

Studio album by Paul Bley
- Released: January 30, 2001
- Recorded: July 4, 2000
- Studios: Studio Tempo, Montreal, Canada
- Genre: Jazz
- Length: 60:06
- Label: Justin Time JUST 154-2
- Producer: Jim West

Paul Bley chronology
| Not Two, Not One (1998) | Basics (2001) | Solo in Mondsee (2001) |

Basics is a solo album by the pianist Paul Bley, recorded in 2000 and released on the Justin Time label.

== Reception ==
Professional ratings
Review scores
| Source | Rating |
|---|---|
| AllMusic | 4/5 stars |
| The Penguin Guide to Jazz | 3.5/4 stars |

The AllMusic review by Glenn Astarita stated: "Paul Bley intermingles askew phraseology with geometrically fabricated lines and endearing propositions. Recommended!". All About Jazz wrote that "like any other true artist, Bley continues to grow and investigate, and Basics shares the complexity of his thought conveyed through his medium of expression". Metro Times noted: "Still impressionistic, he's developed a more fluid approach, which makes listening to the unaccompanied instrument seem like less work than it used to be. His probing comes across as less portentous now, encased in a lyrical flow of playful sensuality". JazzTimes observed: "Although subtly shaded dynamics are a key feature of this disc, there's no denying Bley's percussive attack and firm tone, perhaps originally conceived to cut through the chatter in a noisy club".

== Track listing ==
All compositions by Paul Bley except as indicated

1. "Love Lost" - 4:41
2. "Basics" - 2:29
3. "Speed Kills" - 2:04
4. "Told You So" - 9:15
5. "Lucky" - 8:19
6. "Chet" - 7:51
7. "Walk Home" - 7:35
8. "Blues Waltz" - 6:18
9. "Monk's Mood" (Thelonious Monk) - 4:46
10. "Early Alben" - 2:51
11. "Startled" - 4:01

== Personnel ==
- Paul Bley – piano
