= Ballads (Paul Bley album) =

Studio album by Paul Bley
- Released: 1971
- Recorded: March 31 and July 28, 1967
- Studio: New York City
- Genre: Jazz
- Length: 32:37
- Labels: ECM; ECM 1010 ST
- Producer: Manfred Eicher

Paul Bley chronology
Paul Bley with Gary Peacock (1970)	Ballads (1971)	Improvisie (1971)

Ballads is an album by Canadian jazz pianist Paul Bley recorded on March 31 and July 28, 1967 and released on ECM in 1971. The sessions' trios feature rhythm sections Mark Levinson and Barry Altschul on side B, and Gary Peacock and Altschul on side A, respectively.

== Reception ==
Professional ratings
Review scores
Source	Rating
AllMusic	2.5/5 stars
DownBeat	5/5 stars

The AllMusic review by Eugene Chadbourne states:

Ballads, which really seems to make ballads out of ballads, has been considered both worthy of hanging on the museum wall alongside the other masterpieces and being accorded special merit as the jazz record most used for background music... What all this adds up to, when not shoved to the background of the listener's psyche, is a beautiful sound indeed, this album being one of several that helped establish the entire concept of the divine "ECM sound," despite actually being one of Bley's own productions... Surely it was fun making this album, but it has not proven to be an album that is that much fun to really listen to. Perhaps the music's magic is marred by the excessive echo and pristine recording quality, or maybe the playing is simply pretentious. A decision can be made at the end of the recording, if the listener is still awake.

== Track listing ==
All tracks are written by Annette Peacock.

Side I
No.	Title	Date recorded	Length
1.	"Ending"	July 28, 1967	17:15
Total length:			17:15

Side II
No.	Title	Date recorded	Length
1.	"Circles"	March 31, 1967	3:10
2.	"So Hard It Hurts"	March 31, 1967	12:12
Total length:			15:22 32:37

== Personnel ==
=== Musicians ===
==== March 31, 1967 ====
- Paul Bley – piano
- Mark Levinson – bass
- Barry Altschul – drums

==== July 28, 1967 ====
- Paul Bley – piano
- Gary Peacock – bass
- Barry Altschul – drums

=== Technical personnel ===
- ECM – producer
- B & B Wojirsch – cover design
