= Tango Palace (Paul Bley album) =

Studio album by Paul Bley
- Released: 1985
- Recorded: May 21, 1983
- Genre: Jazz
- Length: 41:03
- Label: Soul Note
- Producer: Giovanni Bonandrini

Paul Bley chronology
Tears (1983)	Tango Palace (1985)	Sonor (1983)

Tango Palace is a solo album by Canadian jazz pianist Paul Bley recorded in 1983 and released on the Italian Soul Note label.

== Reception ==
Professional ratings
Review scores
Source	Rating
AllMusic	3/5 stars
The Penguin Guide to Jazz	3/4 stars

The AllMusic review by Eugene Chadbourne awarded the album 3 stars, stating: "An alarm mechanism goes off at the sight of another solo album by this artist; the acquisition of a complete collection would surely cause floors to sag. Still, the dapper Paul Bley, pipe alit, will arrive at the studio, and by the end of the day a project is completed, with attention paid to all the details that will make such an album an enjoyable, varied listening experience." The Penguin Guide to Jazz described it as "a mellow solo piano date."

== Track listing ==
All compositions credited to Paul Bley, although "But Beautiful" was composed by Burke & Van Heusen

1. "Tango Palace" - 3:40
2. "C.G." - 3:09
3. "Woogie" - 2:22
4. "A.G.B." - 4:08
5. "But Beautiful" - 6:20
6. "Return Love" - 5:31
7. "Bound" - 2:38
8. "Zebra Walk" - 2:55
9. "Please" - 4:50
10. "Explain" - 5:30

- Recorded at Barigozzi Studio in Milano, Italy, on May 21, 1983.

== Personnel ==
- Paul Bley – piano
