= Solo in Mondsee =

Live album by Paul Bley
- Released: 2007
- Recorded: June 25, 2001
- Venue: Schloss Mondsee; Mondsee, Austria
- Genre: Jazz
- Length: 55:38
- Label: ECM; ECM 1786
- Producer: Manfred Eicher

Paul Bley chronology
Basics (2001)	Solo in Mondsee (2007)	Nothing to Declare (2004)

Solo in Mondsee is a live solo album by Canadian jazz pianist Paul Bley, recorded at the Mondsee Abbey, Austria on June 25, 2001 and released on ECM in 2007.

== Reception ==
Professional ratings
Review scores
Source	Rating
AllMusic	4.5/5 stars
The Penguin Guide to Jazz	4/4 stars

The AllMusic review by Thom Jurek awarded the album 4½ stars stating "For anyone who has ever wondered about Bley and his amazing 60-year career in jazz, or for anyone interested in either the piano or improvisation, this recording, like its predecessor, will mystify, delight, and satisfy in ways that cannot really be imagined until Solo in Mondsee is actually encountered."

== Track listing ==
All compositions by Paul Bley

1. "Mondsee Variations I" - 6:39
2. "Mondsee Variations II" - 5:06
3. "Mondsee Variations III" - 2:06
4. "Mondsee Variations IV" - 8:44
5. "Mondsee Variations V" - 3:44
6. "Mondsee Variations VI" - 8:12
7. "Mondsee Variations VII" - 7:40
8. "Mondsee Variations VIII" - 4:38
9. "Mondsee Variations IX" - 3:12
10. "Mondsee Variations X" - 5:37

== Personnel ==
- Paul Bley – piano
