= Gary Peacock =

American jazz double bassist (1935–2020)

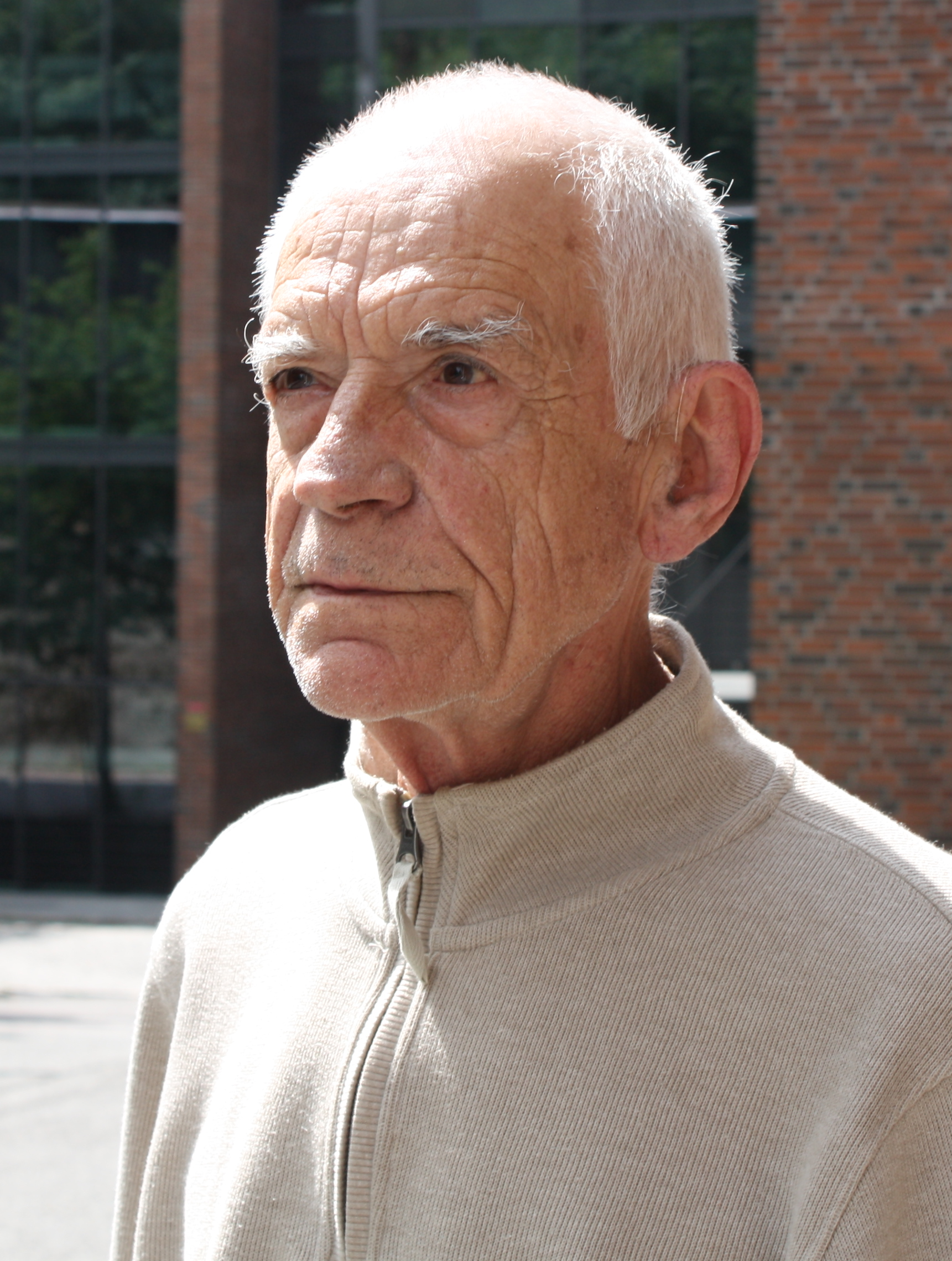
- Peacock in 2014

Background information
- Born: Gary George Peacock; May 12, 1935; Burley, Idaho, U.S.
- Died: September 4, 2020 (aged 85) Olivebridge, New York, U.S.
- Genres: Jazz, post-bop, avant-garde jazz, free jazz
- Occupations: Musician, composer, educator
- Instrument: Double bass
- Years active: 1956–2020

Gary George Peacock (May 12, 1935 – September 4, 2020) was an American jazz double bassist. He recorded a dozen albums under his own name, and also performed and recorded with major jazz figures such as avant garde saxophonist Albert Ayler, pianists Bill Evans, Paul Bley and Marilyn Crispell, and as a part of Keith Jarrett’s “Standards Trio” with drummer Jack DeJohnette. The trio existed for over thirty years, and recorded over twenty albums together. DeJohnette once stated that he admired Peacock's "sound, choice of notes, and, above all, the buoyancy of his playing." Marilyn Crispell called Peacock a "sensitive musician with a great harmonic sense."

== Early life ==
Peacock was born in Burley, Idaho, on May 12, 1935; his father worked as a business consultant for grocery stores, and his mother was a homemaker. He grew up in Yakima, Washington, where he attended Yakima Senior High School, now called A.C. Davis High School. His earliest musical experiences involved playing piano, trumpet, and drums. When he was 15, he heard live jazz for the first time, attending a Jazz at the Philharmonic concert featuring Oscar Peterson and Ray Brown. Peacock graduated in 1953; while playing for his class, he had a profound experience, stating: "I was playing the drums, and had the experience of being played rather than playing... I realized that something transformative had happened... and there was this certainty. From the bottom of my feet to the top of my head, it was totally clear: 'Oh, this is the direction to go.'"

After graduating, Peacock attended the Westlake School of Music in Los Angeles but was then drafted into the Army. While stationed in Germany, he played piano in a jazz trio, but switched to bass when the group's bassist quit. Peacock recalled: "The bass player got married, and his wife didn’t want him out any more. The band’s drummer... said, 'You play bass.' I said, 'I don't want to play bass...' As it turned out, he found a pianist, and I started playing the bass." According to Peacock, he "just sort of figured it out": "I seemed to progress pretty rapidly in a very short time. And since I was stationed in Germany and there weren't any bass players anywhere, it allowed me to be available to play sessions with different people in Frankfurt and the surrounding areas." He also recalled: "The instrument felt natural. It just turned out to be a recognition, like, 'Oh, this is it. This is good.'"

== Career ==
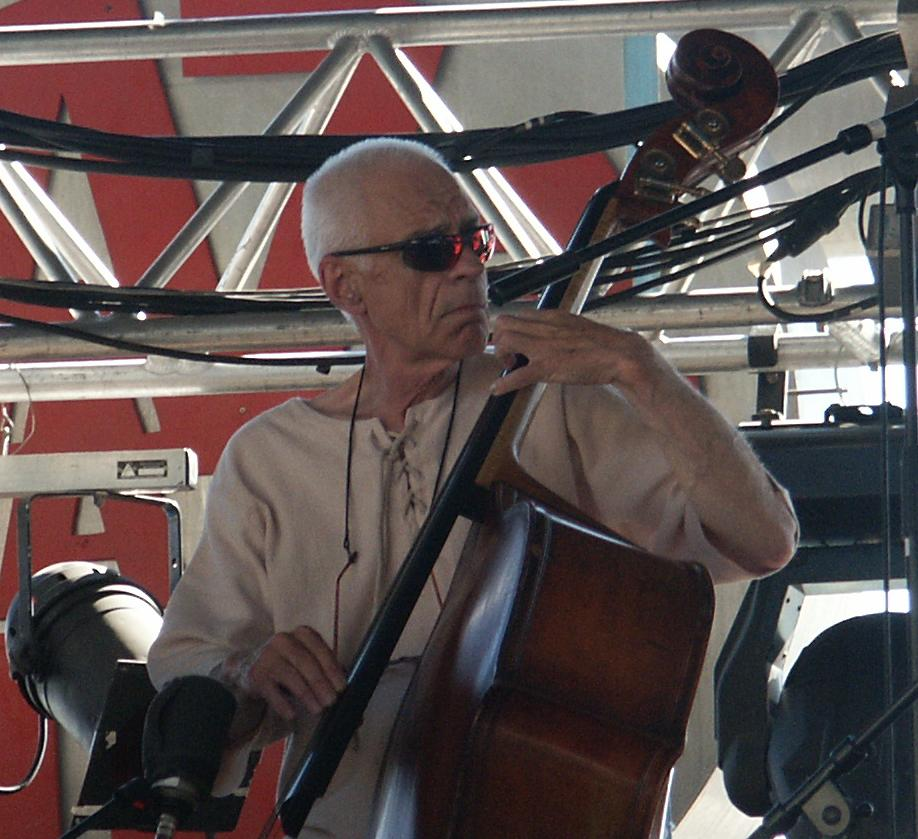
Peacock performing in July 2003

After being discharged from the Army in 1956, Peacock remained in Germany, playing with Hans Koller, Tony Scott, Bud Shank, Attila Zoller, and others, before returning to Los Angeles. He recalled: "I had a standing invitation for a scholarship at Westlake College of Music. So I went to the school. They said, 'Great. Unfortunately, the school is closing.' So I had to start looking for gigs right away. That ended my scholarly education." His bass playing at the time was influenced by Paul Chambers, Ray Brown, and Scott LaFaro, whom he befriended. He soon established himself as a bass player, participating in sessions with Barney Kessel and Art Pepper, and, in 1962, recording with Don Ellis (Essence), Clare Fischer (First Time Out and Surging Ahead), and Prince Lasha (The Cry!). He also married fellow musician Annette Peacock (they later divorced) and began a musical association with pianist Paul Bley, with whom he would go on to record nine albums.

While in California, Peacock heard the music of Ornette Coleman. Initially dismissive, he soon changed his mind: "It challenged that fixed position I had about what jazz improvisation should be and what the rules are. It created a pivot for me to embrace a much larger musical universe." Peacock reflected on how his thinking began to change:

I can remember when I was in Los Angeles about 1959 and I noticed that I was playing less time... In fact, playing the time became very irritating, it just felt like a straightjacket and I wanted to kind of break through that. I simply started listening in myself to what a bass could do and I just began to intentionally play out of time, with some notions, some glimmers of what could be done. I noticed that the time could literally be there and I could be playing something that was basically ametric and yet it worked in some way as far as my ears were concerned... An interesting question [came up]: What would happen if we didn't play the time but just allowed it to be there. Instead of going, 'dingdingding,' just allow it to be there and play something... It opened up something for the pianist, it opened up something for the drums.

In 1962, Peacock moved to New York, where he played with Bley and musicians such as Jimmy Giuffre, Roland Kirk, George Russell, and Archie Shepp. He also joined Bill Evans' trio, which included drummer Paul Motian, who would become a long-time associate, recording the album Trio 64 with the group in December 1963. Peacock recalled that Evans' "sense of harmony was exquisite... The harmonies, and the way that he would voice the harmonies, made a melody not only believable but [so] you wanted to fall in love with it. And because he played low, whatever the bass played, it could be heard; be an integral part of the music." In 1964, Peacock briefly joined Miles Davis' quintet, substituting for Ron Carter in April and May of that year. Reflecting on his time with Davis, he stated:

Miles probably said one of the most brilliant, useful, and necessary comments I've ever heard. Somebody was recording with him, and Miles looked at him and said, "What I want to hear is what you don't know." That is really the key: not playing what you know, playing what you don't know. To do that, you have to get very quiet inside, listen, and surrender to whatever that particular musical setting is. So it doesn't make any difference whether I'm playing standards or free stuff, because you're giving up any kind of fixed positions or attitudes you may have about what it should or shouldn't be. And to do that, you have to be vulnerable, to be in a place where you realize that what you're after, you cannot know. It's not conceivable. But it's there. It's the muse. So it's kind of a switch from the self playing the muse to the muse playing the self.

He also said that Davis "didn't miss one thing. He heard everything that was happening all the time. I could hear that he was hearing it. There was that kind of focus, that kind of attention, that kind of commitment to what's happening. It was a great experience, really a great lesson. Miles was a great teacher, without teaching."

That year, he also appeared on Tony Williams' debut album, Life Time.

In 1964, Peacock joined Albert Ayler's trio, which also featured drummer Sunny Murray, and went on to tour and record with him, appearing on the groundbreaking Spiritual Unity album among others. Regarding Ayler, Peacock stated:

I think he brought something that was so genuine and so natural and so authentic that it was unavoidable. If someone could get past their ideas about what something should be and just listen. It is incredible... He was definitely a major influence for me... He was about music, really, really about music and about continual development with the instrument, with technique, with all of that. So when he played it wasn't just squawks and beeps and honks and that kind of thing. He was really, he was coming from a real place. It was authentic. It was really him.

Peacock continued to record with Bley, Williams (Spring, which also featured Herbie Hancock, Sam Rivers, and Wayne Shorter), and others until the late 1960s, when he began experiencing health problems. He reflected:

I was not in good shape. I was doing a lot of drugs and alcohol, and I was discontented with myself... I happened to meet with Timothy Leary and... took acid. The result of that was realizing, number one, that I didn’t know who the hell I was, whereas before, I’d always identified myself as a musician, a bass player. Then, of course, came "Who am I?" I also noticed that this desire to play music wasn't there anymore. So the question was, what to do. So what I did was nothing. I stopped playing.

At this point, he decided to take a complete break from music. He recalled: "I got involved with macrobiotics and felt drawn to Eastern philosophies and medicine. I became a regular practitioner of macrobiotics and eventually moved to Japan for two and a half years, studying the language, history, and Oriental philosophy." Reflecting on studying the Japanese language, he stated: "There is a great lack of personal pronouns... And the effect that has... is after a time, there is a sense of spaciousness that opens up internally and externally."

By 1970, while still in Japan, Peacock began to play again, recording Eastward in Tokyo with pianist Masabumi Kikuchi and drummer Hiroshi Murakami, followed by Voices the next year. During this time he also recorded with Mal Waldron (First Encounter). In 1972, he returned to the United States and enrolled as a student at the University of Washington, where he studied biology, graduating in 1976. He resumed his musical relationship with Bley, touring Japan and recording Japan Suite. In 1977, he recorded Tales of Another with Keith Jarrett and Jack DeJohnette; together, they would later become known as the Standards Trio due to their focus on jazz standards. This was followed by December Poems, which features four solo bass pieces and two duets with saxophonist Jan Garbarek. From 1977 to 1983, Peacock also taught at the Cornish School of the Arts.

Through the 1980s and '90s, Peacock released a number of albums under his own name, and also played and toured extensively with Jarrett and DeJohnette. He also performed and recorded with a trio known as Tethered Moon, with Masabumi Kikuchi and Motian, as well as recording with Bley, Garbarek, Ralph Towner, and Marc Copland. Regarding the trio format, Peacock stated:

If three people share a common history in a particular area of music and they all found something in that music that freed them, when they get together to play a piece everyone is 100% in that composition... The question is, how much are you willing to give up to play this music? I don't think it can work if you still have an agenda, if you feel you still need to prove something musically. That's not the point – it's just about the music. So you're going to serve that, not yourself or somebody in the audience, not the critics or the reviewers. It's just the music. What does the music want?

The following decades saw Peacock continuing to play and record in the existing trio contexts, as well as with Marilyn Crispell, Lee Konitz, and Bill Frisell, and with a new trio featuring Marc Copland and Joey Baron.

== Death ==
Peacock died on September 4, 2020, at his home in Upstate New York. He was 85; the cause of death was undisclosed.

== Attitude toward music ==
In a 2007 interview, Peacock stated:

I follow a practice that I've done for about ten years. I go through an actual daily practice of greeting the instrument, positioning myself with the instrument, paying attention to my posture, my breathing, the texture, the feeling of the instrument... Sometimes that takes seconds, sometimes it takes five minutes. Just getting a physical-sensory connection. The next thing is when I actually start playing, I don't lose that physical connection. To be completely aware of the sound that I'm playing and also what my feelings are about the sound of the instrument. Just paying attention. I don't try to do anything about it necessarily, but I just play, letting it be there. I might be playing an arpeggio or a melody, but basically the attention is on the sensory-emotional aspect of my playing. And then I let it go.

He also stated: "If you always wake up in the morning and realize, 'Oh my God, I'm just a beginner!,' then you're in a really good place. If you wake up in the morning and say, 'Oh, I've got that handled, I can do anything I want.' - hmm, I don't know." In another interview from 2010, Peacock said "If you've come close to death a few times or what you thought was death, you've realized there's no guarantee that you're going to be alive in the next instant. So my approach to playing is the realization that there are no guarantees anywhere. So where do I want to be, what kind of state to do I want to be in when I'm playing? It helped me to be really focused in a profound way and be really present."

Peacock also discussed the relationship between music and his daily practice of zazen (sitting meditation):

I think music actually prepared me in some ways in coming to zazen, because it was the only window in my life where I felt kind of a spiritual or religious sense. I looked at that, the essence of that and it was just bare awareness. Zazen is the same thing; it's a heightened sense of awareness. My daily mantra is a quote from my Zen teacher, John Daido Loori, Roshi. I asked him one time, "What is Zen?" He said, "Just do what you're doing while you're doing it." It's so simple, but it's so hard!

== Discography ==
Source: AllMusic

=== As leader ===
- Eastward (CBS/Sony, 1970) with Masabumi Kikuchi, Hiroshi Murakami
- Voices (CBS/Sony, 1971) with Masabumi Kikuchi, Hiroshi Murakami, Masahiko Togashi
- Tales of Another (ECM, 1977) with Keith Jarrett, Jack DeJohnette
- December Poems (ECM, 1978) with Jan Garbarek
- Shift in the Wind (ECM, 1980) with Art Lande, Eliot Zigmund
- Voice from the Past – Paradigm (ECM, 1982) with Tomasz Stanko, Jan Garbarek, Jack DeJohnette – rec. 1981
- Guamba (ECM, 1987) with Palle Mikkelborg, Jan Garbarek, Peter Erskine
- Oracle (ECM, 1993) with Ralph Towner
- Just So Happens (Postcards, 1994) with Bill Frisell
- A Closer View (ECM, 1998) with Ralph Towner – rec. 1995
- Now This (ECM, 2015) with Marc Copland, Joey Baron
- Tangents (ECM, 2017) with Marc Copland, Joey Baron

=== As a member ===
Tethered Moon
Trio with Masabumi Kikuchi and Paul Motian

- First Meeting (Winter & Winter, 1997) – rec. 1990-1991
- Tethered Moon (King/Paddle Wheel, 1992)
- Triangle (King/Paddle Wheel, 1993)
- Tethered Moon Play Kurt Weill (JMT, 1995) – reissued on (Winter & Winter, 2005)
- Chansons d'Édith Piaf (Winter & Winter, 1999)
- Experiencing Tosca (Winter & Winter, 2004)

=== As sideman ===
With Albert Ayler

- Ghosts (Debut, 1965) – rec. 1964
- New York Eye and Ear Control (ESP-Disk, 1965) – rec. 1964
- Spiritual Unity (ESP-Disk, 1965)
- Spirits Rejoice (ESP-Disk, 1965)
- Prophecy (ESP-Disk, 1975) – rec. 1964
- The Hilversum Session (Osmosis, 1980) – rec. 1964
- Albert Smiles With Sunny (InRespect, 1996) – rec. 1964
- The Copenhagen Tapes (Ayler, 2002) – rec. 1964
- Holy Ghost: Rare & Unissued Recordings (1962–70) (Revenant, 2004) – compilation

With Paul Bley

- Mr. Joy (Limelight, 1968)
- Paul Bley with Gary Peacock (ECM, 1970) – rec. 1964, 1968
- Ballads (ECM, 1971) – rec. 1967
- Turning Point (Improvising Artists, 1975) – rec. 1964, 1968
- Virtuosi (Improvising Artists, 1976) – rec. 1967. also with Barry Altschul.
- Japan Suite (Improvising Artists, 1977) – live rec. 1976
- Partners (Owl, 1991) – rec. 1989
- In the Evenings out There (ECM, 1993) – rec. 1991
- Annette (Hat ART, 1993) – rec. 1992
- Not Two, Not One (ECM, 1999) – rec. 1998

With Marc Copland

- My Foolish Heart (Jazz City, 1988) with John Abercrombie, Jeff Hirshfield
- All Blues at Night (Jazz City, 1989) with Tim Hagans, Bill Stewart
- At Night (album)|At Night (Sunnyside, 1992) with Billy Hart
- Paradiso (Soul Note, 1995) with Billy Hart
- Softly (1998 album)|Softly (Savoy, 1998) with Mike Brecker, Tim Hagans, Joe Lovano, Bill Stewart
- What It Says (Sketch, 2004)
- Modinha - New York Trio Recordings Vol. 1 (Pirouet, 2006) trio with Bill Stewart
- Voices - New York Trio Recordings Vol. 2 (Pirouet, 2007) trio with Paul Motian
- Insight (Pirouet, 2009)

With Marilyn Crispell

- Nothing Ever Was, Anyway: Music of Annette Peacock (ECM, 1997) – rec. 1996
- Amaryllis (ECM, 2001) – rec. 2000
- Azure (ECM, 2013) – rec. 2011
- In Motion (Intakt, 2016) – rec. 2014

With Clare Fischer

- First Time Out (Pacific Jazz, 1962)
- Surging Ahead (Pacific Jazz, 1962)

With Toninho Horta

- Once I Loved (Verve, 1992)
- From Ton To Tom (VideoArts Music, 1998)

With Keith Jarrett

- Standards, Vol. 1 (ECM, 1983)
- Standards, Vol. 2 (ECM, 1983)
- Changes (ECM, 1984) – rec. 1983
- Standards Live (ECM, 1986) – rec. 1985
- Still Live (ECM, 1989) – rec. 1986
- Changeless (ECM, 1989) – rec. 1987
- Tribute (ECM, 1990) – rec. 1989
- The Cure (ECM, 1991) – rec. 1990
- Bye Bye Blackbird (ECM, 1993) – rec. 1991
- At the Deer Head Inn (ECM, 1994) – rec. 1992
- Standards in Norway (ECM, 1995) – rec. 1989
- Keith Jarrett at the Blue Note (ECM, 1995) – rec. 1994
- Tokyo '96 (ECM, 1998) – rec. 1996
- Whisper Not (ECM, 2000) – rec. 1999
- Inside Out (ECM, 2001) – rec. 2000
- Always Let Me Go (ECM, 2002) – rec. 2001
- Up for It (ECM, 2003) – rec. 2002
- The Out-of-Towners (ECM, 2004) – rec. 2001
- My Foolish Heart (ECM, 2007) – rec. 2001
- Yesterdays (ECM, 2009) – rec. 2001
- Somewhere (ECM, 2013) – rec. 2009
- After the Fall (ECM, 2018) – rec. 1998
- The Old Country (More From The Deer Head Inn) (ECM, 2024) - rec. 1992

With Robert Kaddouch

- 53rd Street (Odradek, 2016)
- High Line (Odradek, 2016)

With Bud Shank

- Holiday in Brazil (World Pacific, 1958)
- Latin Contrasts (World Pacific, 1958)
- Slippery When Wet (World Pacific, 1959)
- New Groove (Pacific Jazz, 1961)
- Barefoot Adventure (Pacific Jazz, 1961)

With Tony Williams

- Life Time (Blue Note, 1965) – rec. 1964
- Spring (Blue Note, 1966) – rec. 1965

With others

- Franck Amsallem, Out a Day (OMD, 1990) –also with Bill Stewart
- Bill Carrothers, Home Row (Pirouet) – also with Bill Carrothers, Bill Stewart
- Chick Corea, Live In Montreux (GRP, 1981) – also with Joe Henderson and Roy Haynes
- Lowell Davidson, Lowell Davidson Trio (ESP-Disk, 1965)
- Don Ellis, Essence (Pacific Jazz, 1962)
- Bill Evans, Trio 64 (Verve, 1964)
- Barney Kessel, Barney Kessel's Swingin' Party (Contemporary, 1963)
- Prince Lasha and Sonny Simmons, The Cry! (Contemporary, 1962)
- Misha Mengelberg, Driekusman Total Loss (VaraJazz (Netherlands), 1981)
- Don Pullen, New Beginnings (Blue Note, 1988)
- Ravi Shankar, Improvisations (World Pacific, 1962)
- John Surman, Adventure Playground (ECM, 1991)
- Ralph Towner, City of Eyes (ECM, 1988)
- Mal Waldron, First Encounter (RCA Victor (Japan), 1971)
- Jimmy Woods, Awakening!! (Contemporary, 1962)
- Hōzan Yamamoto, Ginkai (Philips, Nihon Phonogram, 1971) – also with Masabumi Kikuchi

== Filmography ==
=== Film ===
==== Composer ====
Year	Title	Credit	Notes
1961	Toys on a Field of Blue	composer	short film
1964	New York Eye and Ear Control	composer	short film

==== Performer ====
Year	Title	Credit	Notes
1960	Barefoot Adventure	musician	surfing documentary
1985	Keith Jarrett: Standards	himself (bass guitar)	direct-to-video documentary
1993	The Keith Jarrett Trio: Live at Open Theatre East	himself (bass guitar)	direct-to-video documentary
2020	ECM50 – 2015 Gary Peacock	himself	episode in 50-part documentary series on ECM Records

==== Soundtrack ====
Year	Title	Credit	Notes
2001	Mostly Martha	"Never Let Me Go" & "U Dance" performed by: (credited w/Keith Jarrett & Jack DeJohnette)	soundtrack

=== Television ===
Performer

Year	Title	Credit	Notes
1962	Frankly Jazz	himself (musician: bass)	(TV series) original air date: November 10, 1962
