= Paul Bley =

Canadian jazz pianist (1932–2016)

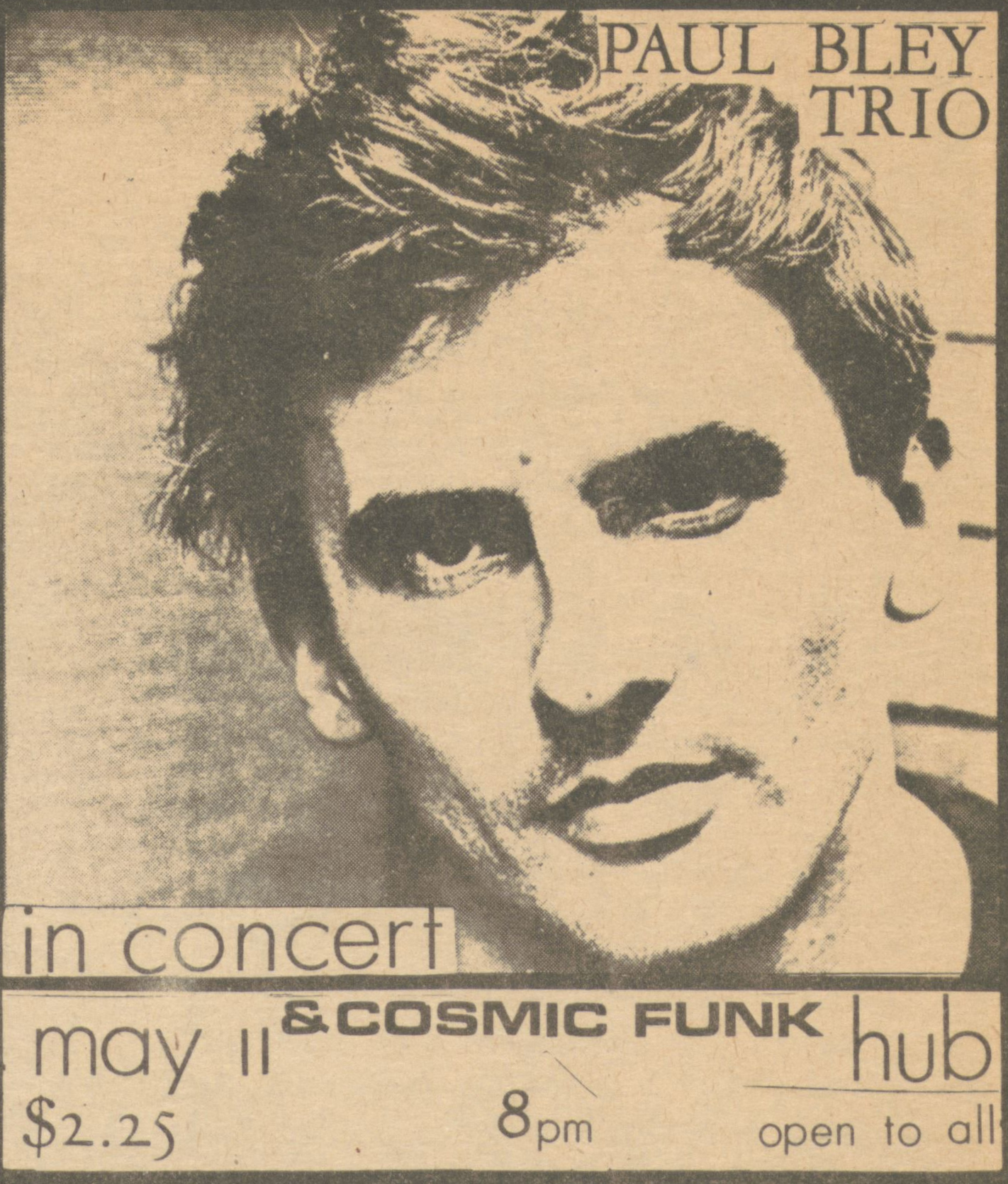
- Paul Bley, 1968

Background information
- Born: Hyman Bley; November 10, 1932; Montreal, Quebec, Canada
- Died: January 3, 2016 (aged 83) Stuart, Florida, U.S.
- Genres: Avant-garde jazz, free jazz, free improvisation, post bop
- Occupations: Musician, composer
- Instruments: Piano, synthesizers
- Formerly of: Carla Bley, Art Blakey, Charlie Parker, Ben Webster, Sonny Rollins, Chet Baker, Don Cherry, Ornette Coleman, Gary Peacock, Jimmy Giuffre, Charlie Haden, Charles Mingus, Paul Motian, Annette Peacock, Gary Peacock, Steve Swallow, Barry Altschul, Jaco Pastorius, Pat Metheny, John Abercrombie, Coleman Hawkins, Steve Lacy
- Website: improvart.com/bley/

Paul Bley, CM (November 10, 1932 – January 3, 2016) was a Canadian jazz pianist known for his contributions to the free jazz movement of the 1960s as well as his innovations and influence on trio playing and his early live performance on the Moog and ARP synthesizers. His music has been described by Ben Ratliff of the New York Times as "deeply original and aesthetically aggressive". Bley's prolific output includes influential recordings from the 1950s through to his solo piano recordings of the 2000s.

== Early life ==
Bley was born in Montreal, Quebec, on November 10, 1932. His adoptive parents were Betty Marcovitch, an immigrant from Romania, and Joseph Bley, owner of an embroidery factory, who named him Hyman Bley. However, in 1993 a relative from the New York branch of the Bley family walked into the Sweet Basil Jazz Club in New York City and informed Bley that his father was actually his biological parent. At age five Bley began studying the violin, but at age seven, after his mother divorced his father, he decided to switch to the piano. By eleven he had received a junior diploma from the McGill Conservatory in Montreal. At thirteen he formed a band which played at summer resorts in Ste. Agathe, Quebec. As a teenager he changed his name to "Paul," thinking that girls would find it more attractive. Also as a teenager, he played with touring American bands, including Al Cowan's Tramp Band. In 1949, when Bley was starting his senior year of high school, Oscar Peterson asked Bley to fulfill his contract at the Alberta Lounge in Montreal. The next year Bley left Montreal for New York City and Juilliard. Bley lived in the United States for his entire adult life, but never renounced his Canadian citizenship.

== 1950s ==
In 1951, on summer break from Juilliard, Bley returned to Montreal where he helped organize the Montreal Jazz Workshop. In 1953 Bley invited the bebop alto saxophonist and composer Charlie Parker to the Jazz Workshop, where he played and recorded with him, making the record Charlie Parker Montreal 1953. When Bley returned to New York City he hired Jackie McLean, Al Levitt and Doug Watkins to play an extended gig at the Copa City on Long Island. From the early 1950s until 1960 Bley did a series of trios with Al Levitt and Peter Ind; recordings of this trio in 1954 were included in the Mercury album Paul Bley. In 1953 the Shaw Agency booked Bley and his trio to tour with Lester Young, billed as "Lester Young and the Paul Bley Trio" in advertisements. He also performed with tenor saxophonist Ben Webster at that time. Additionally, in 1953, Charles Mingus produced the Introducing Paul Bley album for his label, Debut Records with Mingus on bass and drummer Art Blakey. (In 1960 Bley recorded again with the Charles Mingus Group.)

In 1954, Bley received a call from Chet Baker inviting him to play opposite Baker's quintet at Jazz City in Hollywood, California, for the month of March. This was followed by a tour with singer Dakota Staton. Down Beat Magazine interviewed Bley for its July 13, 1955, issue. The prescient title of the article read, "PAUL BLEY, Jazz Is Just About Ready for Another Revolution". The article, reprinted in Down Beat's 50th Anniversary edition, quoted Bley as saying, "I'd like to write longer forms, I'd like to write music without a chordal center."

Bley's trio with Hal Gaylor and Lennie McBrowne toured across the US in 1956, including a club in Juarez. Mexico. The tour culminated with an invitation to play a 1956 New Year's Eve gig at Lucille Ball and Desi Arnaz's home in Palm Springs. During the evening, Bley collapsed on the bandstand with a bleeding ulcer and Lucille immediately took him to the Palm Springs Hospital where she proceeded to pay for all of his medical care. Bley, who had met Karen Borg while she was working as a cigarette girl at Birdland in New York, married her after she came out to meet him in Los Angeles, where she became Carla Bley.

In 1957, Bley stayed in Los Angeles where he had the house band at the Hillcrest Club. By 1958 the original band, with vibe player, Dave Pike, evolved into a quintet with Bley hiring young avant garde musicians trumpet player Don Cherry, alto saxophonist Ornette Coleman, bassist Charlie Haden and drummer Billy Higgins.

== 1960s ==
In the early 1960s, Bley was part of a trio with Jimmy Giuffre on reeds and Steve Swallow on bass. Its repertoire included compositions by Giuffre, Bley and his now ex-wife, composer Carla Bley. The group's music presented innovations in chamber jazz and free jazz. The 1961 European tour of The Giuffre 3 shocked a public expecting Bebop, however the many recordings released from this tour have proven to be classics of free jazz. During the same period, Bley was touring and recording with tenor saxophonist Sonny Rollins, which culminated with the RCA Victor album Sonny Meets Hawk! with tenor saxophonist Coleman Hawkins. Bley's solo on "All the Things You Are" from this album has been called "the shot heard around the world" by Pat Metheny.

In 1964, Bley was instrumental in the formation of the Jazz Composers Guild, a co-operative organization which brought together many free jazz musicians in New York: Bill Dixon, Roswell Rudd, Cecil Taylor, Archie Shepp, Carla Bley, Michael Mantler, Sun Ra, and others. The guild organized weekly concerts and created a forum for the "October Revolution" of 1964. The influential album, Turning Point, released by Improvising Artists in 1975, was recorded in 1964 when Bley brought John Gilmore, Gary Peacock, and Paul Motian to the University of Washington.

In the late 1960s, Bley pioneered the use of the ARP and Moog synthesizers, doing the first live synthesizer performance at Philharmonic Hall in New York City on December 26, 1969. This "Bley-Peacock Synthesizer Show" performance, a group with singer/composer Annette Peacock, who had written much of his personal repertoire since 1964, was followed by her playing on the recordings Dual Unity (credited to "Annette & Paul Bley") and Improvisie. The latter was a French release of two extended improvisational tracks with Bley on synthesizers, Peacock's voice and keyboards, and percussion by Dutch free jazz drummer Han Bennink, who had also appeared on part of Dual Unity.

== 1970s ==
In 1972, Manfred Eicher released Bley's first solo piano recording, Open, to Love, on ECM Records. Bley also released the trio album, Paul Bley & Scorpio for Milestone Records in 1972 on which he plays two electric pianos and Arp synthesizer. In 1974, Bley and video artist Carol Goss, his second wife, founded the production company Improvising Artists, known as IAI Records & Video. The label issued acoustic recordings by many of the most creative improvisers of the twentieth century as well as the electric quartet album, Jaco, the debut recording of Pat Metheny on electric guitar and Jaco Pastorius on electric bass, with Bley on electric piano and Bruce Ditmas on drums. IAI records and videos include performances by Jimmy Giuffre, Lee Konitz, Dave Holland, Marion Brown, Gunter Hampel, Lester Bowie, Steve Lacy, Ran Blake, Perry Robinson, Naná Vasconcelos, Badal Roy, John Gilmore, Gary Peacock, two solo piano records by Sun Ra, and others. Bley and Carol Goss are credited in a Billboard cover story with the first commercial "music video". Goss produced live video recordings with IAI Records artists, projecting the images from analog video synthesizers during the performances. In addition, her video art is often accompanied by Paul Bley's solo piano music as well as his electric band recordings, some of which have not yet been released on audio records.

== 1980s ==
Bley was featured in Ron Mann's 1981 documentary film Imagine the Sound, in which he performs and discusses the evolution of free jazz and his music. Bley began to record for multiple labels in the 1980s in many different formats including: solo piano albums Tears for Owl Records, Tango Palace for Soulnote, PAUL BLEY SOLO for Justin Time Records, Blues for Red for Red Records, and Solo Piano for SteepleChase Records; duo and larger-group recordings Diane (album) with Chet Baker for SteepleChase Records, The Montreal Tapes with Charlie Haden and Paul Motian for Verve, Fragments with John Surman, Bill Frisell, and Paul Motian for ECM, three new recordings with Jimmy Giuffre and Steve Swallow for Owl Records, and numerous other recordings.

== 1990s ==
Bley continued to tour in Europe, Japan, South America and the US recording prolifically as a soloist and with a wide range of ensembles. In 1993 the Montreal International Jazz Festival produced a Paul Bley Homage concert series of four nights. In some years he recorded more than eight albums. Notably, Bley revisited the synthesizer in a record for Postcards titled Synthesis.

During this time, Bley also became a part-time faculty member of the New England Music Conservatory, where he taught musicians Satoko Fujii and Yitzhak Yedid. He would travel to Boston for one day a month, ostensibly to have lobster, often meeting with students in coffee shops as he considered that they already knew how to play, but needed guidance in life.

The American television network Bravo and the French-German network Arte co-produced a one-hour biography of Paul Bley in 1998.

Bley's autobiography was published in 1999

== 2000s ==
In 2001 the National Archives of Canada acquired Bley's archives. In 2003 a book based on Bley interviews by musicologist Norman Meehan (Time Will Tell) was published. It was an in depth discussion of the process of improvisation. In 2008, he was made a member of the Order of Canada. In 2009 the book Paul Bley: The Logic of Chance, written in Italian by jazz pianist Arrigo Cappelletti and translated into English by jazz pianist Greg Burk, was published. In addition to touring solo in the US and Europe, Bley released several solo piano recordings in this decade, including Basics, Nothing to Declare and About Time for Justin Time Records and Solo in Mondsee and Play Blue - Oslo Concert for ECM Records. Bley's last public performances were in 2010 playing a solo piano concert at the La Villette Jazz Festival in Paris, followed by a duo with Charlie Haden at BlueNote in New York City during a full moon.

Bley died of natural causes on January 3, 2016, at home in Stuart, Florida, aged 83.
