= Daniel Hertz S.A. =

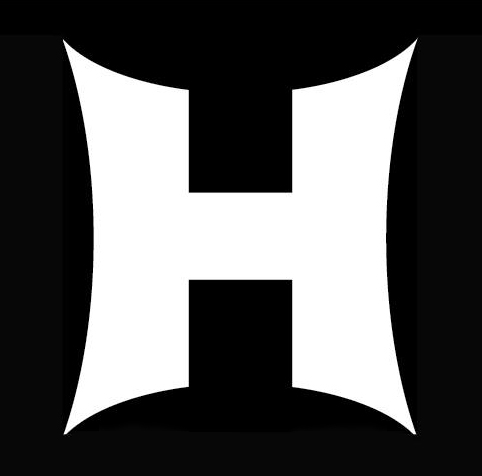
- Industry: High-end audio
- Founder: Mark Levinson (Director)
- Products: Loudspeakers and Amplifiers
- Website: www.danielhertz.com

Daniel Hertz S.A. is a high-performance audio company based in Switzerland. The company makes high-efficiency loudspeakers, power amplifiers, pre-amplifiers, integrated amplifiers, and audio processing software. Daniel Hertz provides consulting services to major companies like LG Electronics of Korea and semiconductor firm Intersil of the USA.

Daniel Hertz was founded in 2007 by Mark Levinson, who had previously founded Mark Levinson Audio Systems, Cello Ltd. and Red Rose Music. The company name combines the given name of Levinson's father with his mother's family name. His father Daniel Levinson was a professor of psychology at Yale University, his mother Maria is a grandniece of German physicist Heinrich Hertz, after whom the scientific unit for cycles-per-second is named.
