= Lexus LX =

Full-size luxury SUV model from Lexus

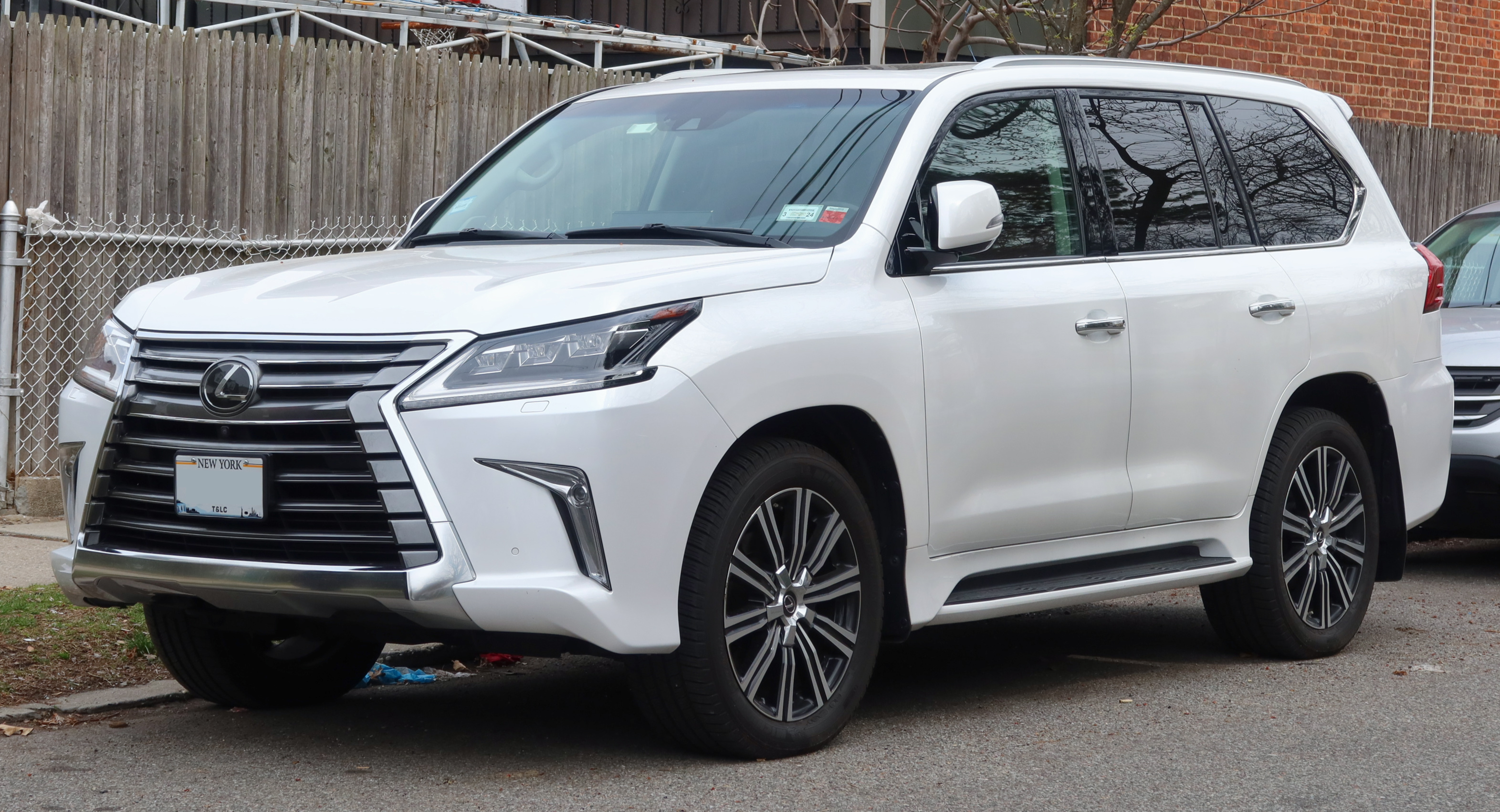
- 2018 Lexus LX 570 (URJ201, US)

Overview
- Manufacturer: Toyota
- Also called: Toyota Land Cruiser
- Production: November 1995 – present
- Model years: 1996–present
- Assembly: Japan: Toyota City, Aichi (Yoshiwara plant)

Body and chassis
- Class: Full-size luxury SUV
- Body style: 5-door SUV
- Layout: Front-engine, four-wheel-drive
- Chassis: Body-on-frame

The Lexus LX (Japanese: レクサス・LX, Hepburn: Rekusasu LX) is a full-size luxury SUV sold by Lexus, a luxury division of Toyota, since January 1996, having entered manufacturing in November 1995. As the flagship SUV from Lexus, it is the company's largest and most expensive SUV. Four generations have been produced, all based heavily on the long-running Toyota Land Cruiser SUVs. The first-generation LX 450 started production in 1995 as Lexus' first entry into the SUV market. Its successor, the LX 470, premiered in 1998 and was manufactured until 2007. The third-generation LX debuted at the New York International Auto Show in April 2007. The fourth-generation LX debuted in October 2021.

The first-generation LX 450 had a straight-six engine and seats for seven passengers. The second and third-generations had a V8 engine powertrain, a welded steel body-shell combined with full-size steel ladder frame (body-on-frame construction), and seats for eight passengers. The fourth-generation model has a twin-turbocharged V6 engine powertrain and seats for seven passengers as standard and four passengers as an option. The second-generation LX 470 shared exterior styling with the Japanese domestic market Land Cruiser Cygnus.

According to Lexus, the "LX" name stands for "Luxury Crossover". However, some Lexus importers use the backronymic name, "Luxury Four Wheel Drive".

== First generation (J80; 1995) ==
First generation
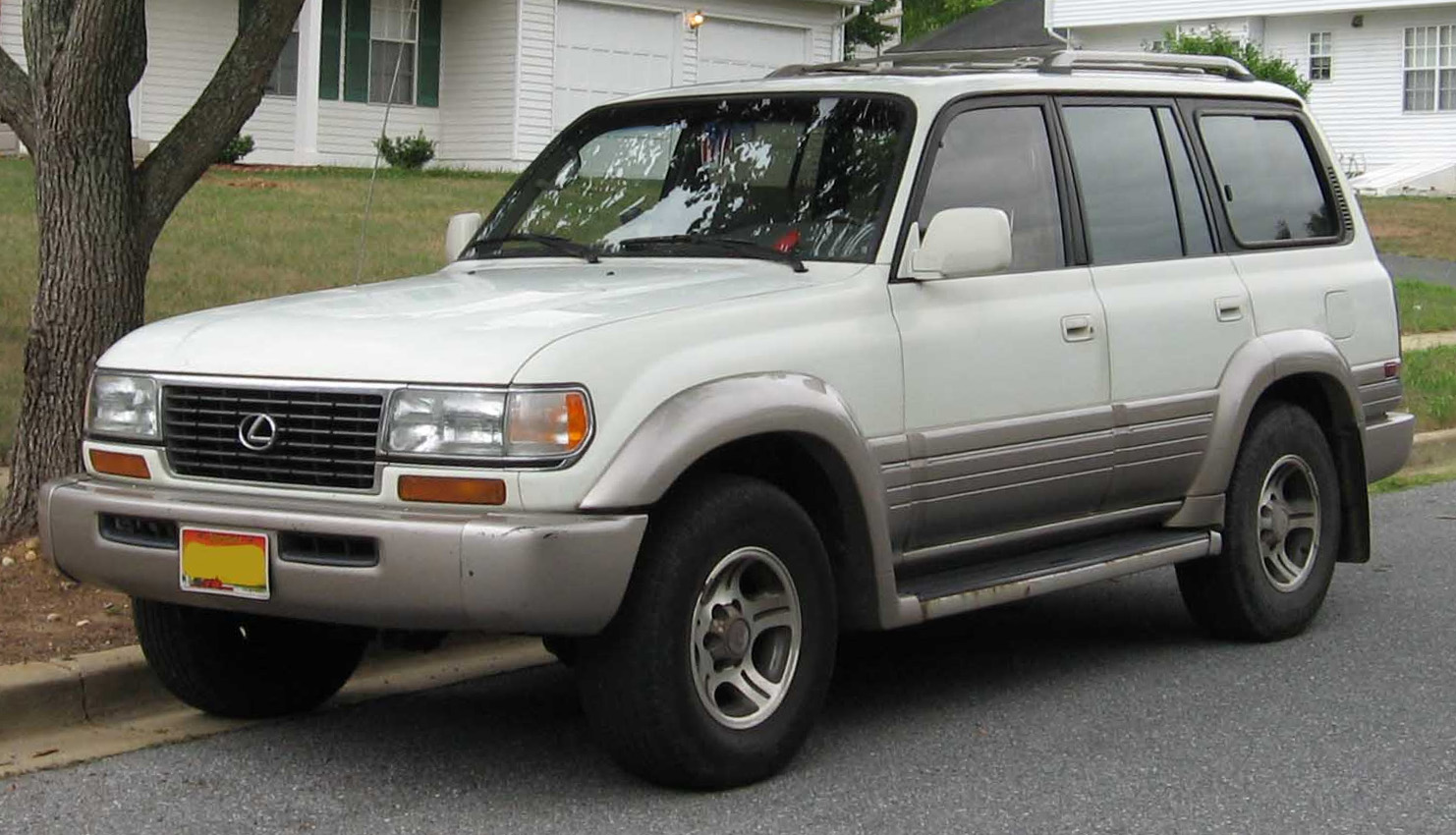
- 1995–1997 LX 450 (US)

Overview
- Model code: J80
- Also called: Toyota Land Cruiser (J80)
- Production: November 1995 – December 1997
- Model years: 1996–1997

Body and chassis
- Related: Toyota Land Cruiser (J80)

Powertrain
- Engine: Gasoline: 4.5 L 1FZ-FE I6 (LX 450; FZJ80)
- Transmission: 4-speed A343F automatic

Dimensions
- Wheelbase: 2,850 mm (112.2 in)
- Length: 4,821 mm (189.8 in)
- Width: 1,930 mm (76.0 in)
- Height: 1,869 mm (73.6 in)

=== 1995–1997 ===
Rapidly developed in the mid-1990s as a result of threatening US trade sanctions on Japanese luxury cars, the LX 450 started production in November 1995 and was released to the US in January 1996 as a 1996 model; Canada received the LX from 1997. The LX 450 was Lexus's first SUV and was almost entirely based on the sixth generation Toyota Land Cruiser (J80). Differences lay in a restyled, more luxurious interior and softer suspension settings. The first LX 450 rolled off the production line in December 1995.

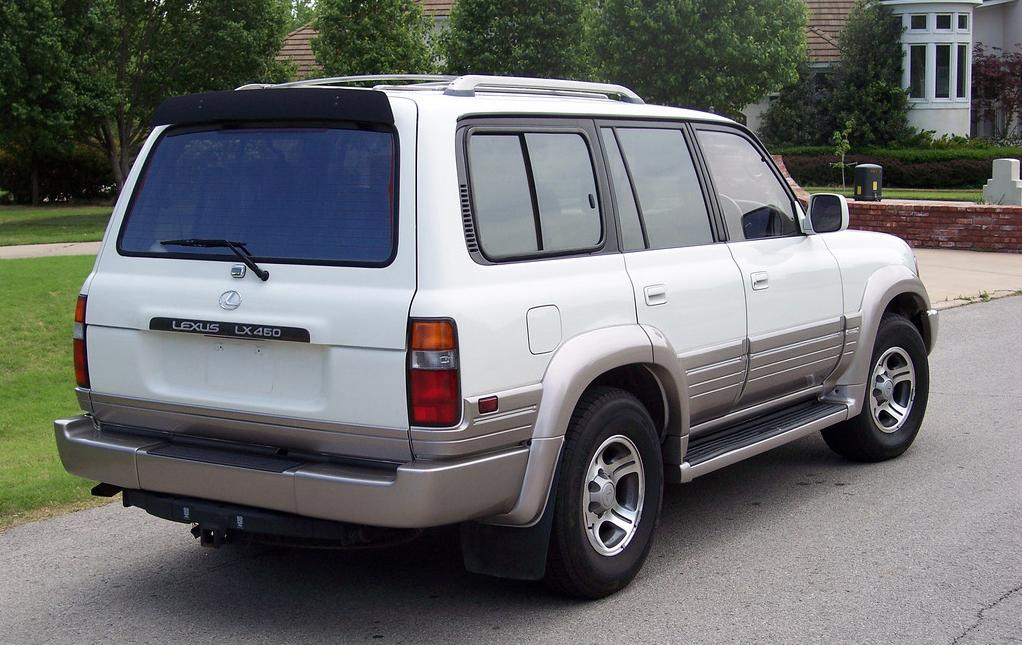
Lexus LX 450, rear view

The LX 450 was powered by a 4.5-liter, twin-cam, four-valve inline-six engine that produced 160 kW (215 hp) and 373 N⋅m (275 lb⋅ft) of torque. Both front and rear axles were solid. Externally, the LX 450 was identical to the J80 series Land Cruiser, with the exception of the grille, side body cladding, and wheels. Side running boards give step-up access. The vehicle had additional sound-absorbing insulation.

Amenities included leather seats and seating for seven passengers in three rows, the third row accessed by tilting the second row bench seat forward. The third row could be folded to the side and the second row folded down for further space. The vehicle was pre-wired for the Lexus remote telephone system, and had a remote entry key system. The three options consisted of a console-mounted 6-disc CD changer, electronic front and rear locking differentials, and a power moonroof. At the time of its sales debut in early 1996, the LX 450 was listed in the US at a suggested base price of $47,995, an approximately $7,000 premium over the Land Cruiser, with a base price of $40,678 in 1996, but a similarly optioned Land Cruiser would cost $46,968.

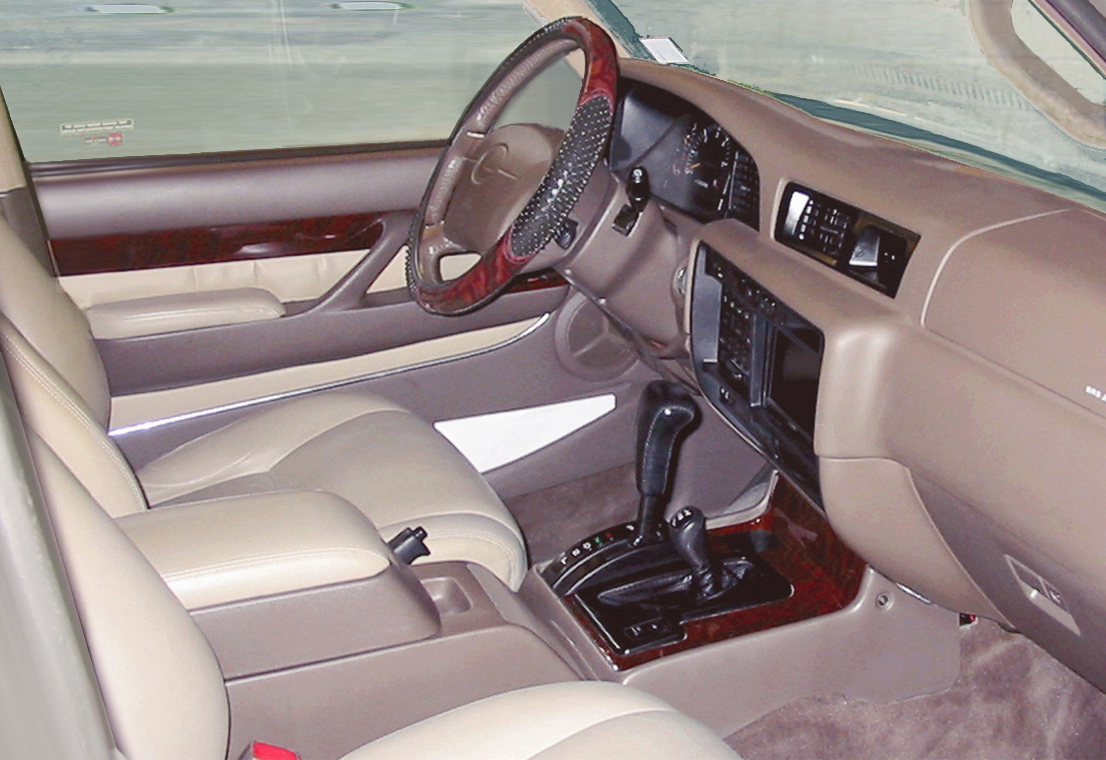
Interior

Targeted against luxury SUV competitors such as Range Rover, the LX 450 sold over 5,000 units in 1996 and over 9,000 units in 1997. At its launch it sold out its initial production allocation, resulting in a two-month wait list, surpassing initial expectations which had called for 4,000 units that year. It was brought to market as US buyers showed greater interest in large SUVs, which had grown popular because of their high driver's vantage point and truck-like characteristics. Lexus customer research revealed that one in six owners were purchasing large SUVs to add to their garages. An additional factor was the US-Japan trade war of the mid-1990s. The US government threatened to place 100 percent tariffs on all Japanese luxury import cars, but not including SUVs. The LX 450 was produced as a rebadged model (in contrast with other Lexus efforts which were independently or divergently developed from Toyota vehicles), giving a model that was exempt from the tariff. Ultimately a gentlemen's agreement was reached and the threatened tariffs did not materialize.

The LX 450 replaced the Land Cruiser in the Canadian market starting after 1996, reducing internal competition (big expensive SUVs have traditionally faced a difficult market in Canada) and avoiding the issue of selling a rebadged model (except for GM, Ford and Chrysler, rebadged models in Canada have not met with success). For a 5,000 lb (2,300 kg) vehicle, the LX 450 was regarded by some critics as underpowered, leading to the shortening of its model cycle (despite sales increases) and replacement with a V8-powered successor.

The LX 450 was the top-ranked full-size SUV in J.D. Power and Associates' Initial Quality Survey, with the lowest number of problems during the first three months of ownership.

=== Engines ===
Model	Engine	Power	Max. Torque	Region	Years
LX 450	1FZ-FE I6 4,477 cc (273.2 cu in)	160 kW (215 hp) at 4,600 rpm	373 N⋅m (275 lbf⋅ft) at 3,200 rpm		1995-1997

== Second generation (J100; 1998) ==
Second generation
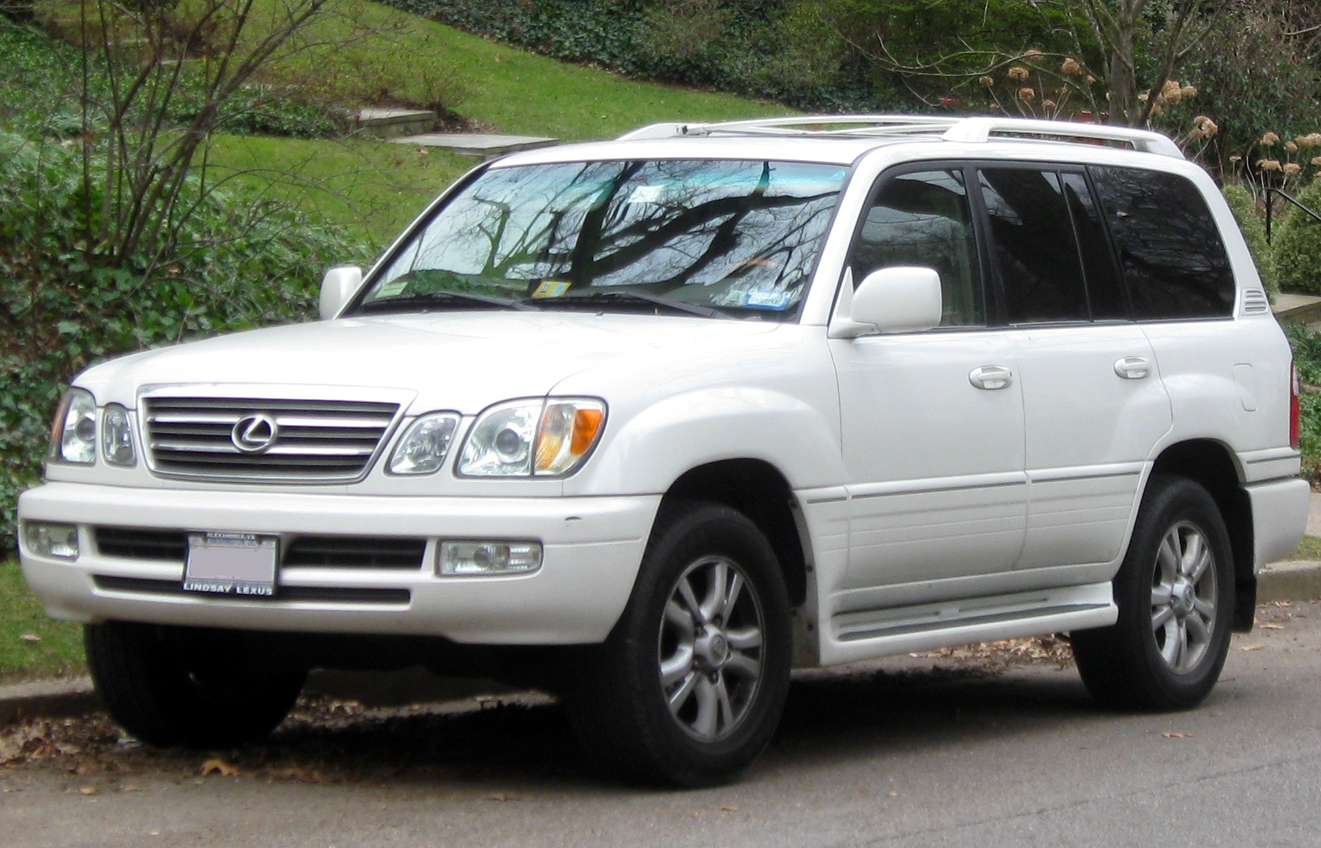
- 2002–2005 Lexus LX 470

Overview
- Model code: J100
- Also called: Toyota Land Cruiser Cygnus (J100)
- Production: January 1998 – October 2007
- Model years: 1998–2007
- Designer: Hiroya Kitazumi (1995, facelift: 2000, second facelift: 2003)

Body and chassis
- Related: Toyota Land Cruiser (J100)

Powertrain
- Engine: Gasoline: 4.7 L 2UZ-FE V8 (LX 470; UZJ100)
- Transmission: 4-speed A343F automatic; 5-speed A750F automatic

Dimensions
- Wheelbase: 2,850 mm (112.2 in)
- Length: 4,890 mm (192.5 in)
- Width: 1,941 mm (76.4 in)
- Height: 1,849 mm (72.8 in)

=== 1998–2002 ===
In the mid-1990s, work started on a Lexus variant of the Toyota Land Cruiser (J100), the LX (J100). The final design by Hiroya Kitazumi was approved in 1995, with updates by Kitazumi approved in 2001 and 2004. Testing was conducted from the mid-1990s till late 1997. In December 1997, the second generation LX 470 debuted at the Los Angeles Auto Show, going on sale in the second quarter of 1998. It shared the floor pan and most body panels with the equivalent Land Cruiser, and differed in its front appearance and had a more luxurious interior. Exterior design differences included a quad-headlamp forward fascia with larger grille and different wheels. It was powered by a LEV-certified 4.7-liter V8 engine, which initially produced 172 kW (230 hp), later upgraded to 175 kW (235 hp), then 200 kW (268 hp). The final torque value was 445 N⋅m (328 lb⋅ft). It was rated to tow 2,900 kg (6,500 lb) with the tow package installed.

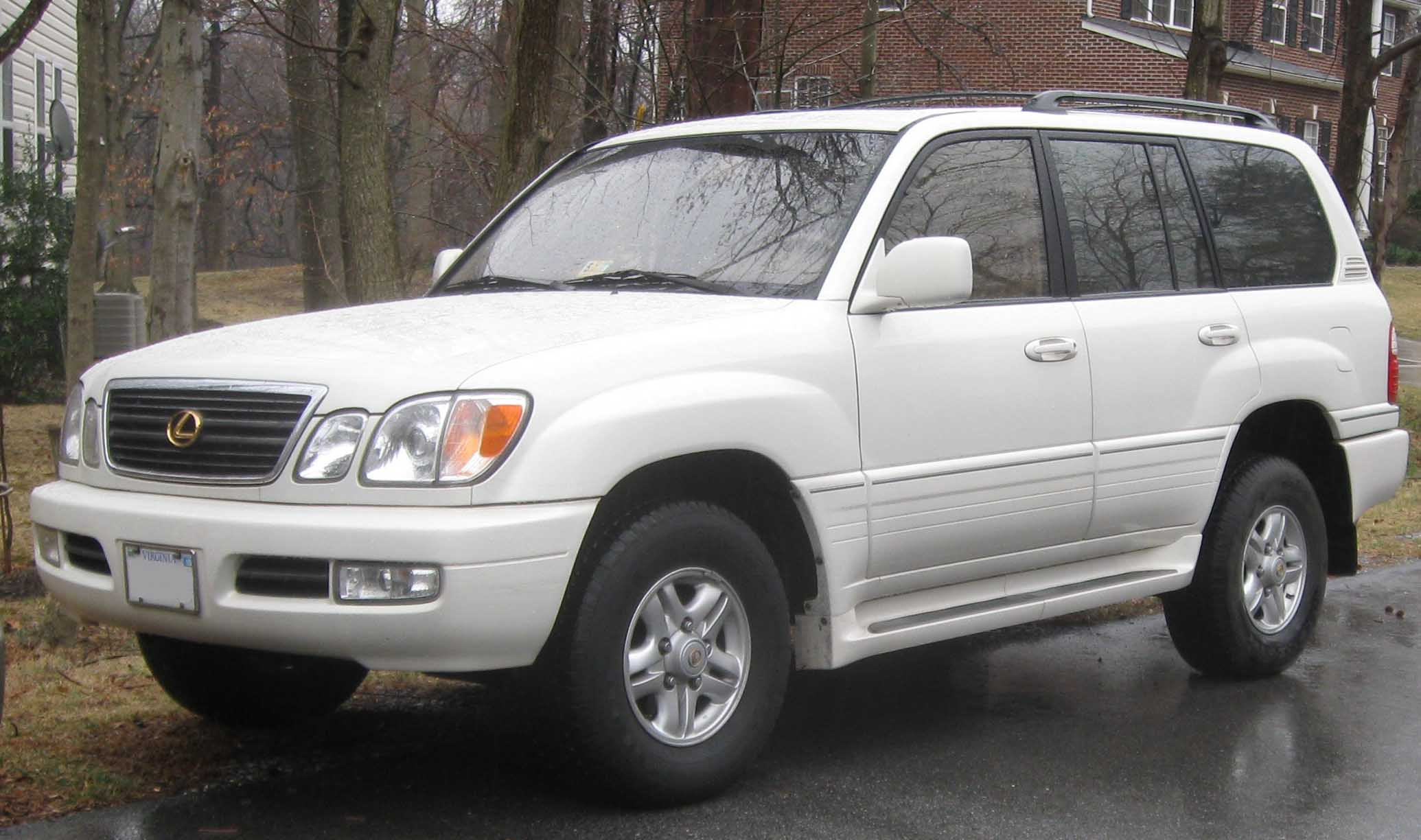

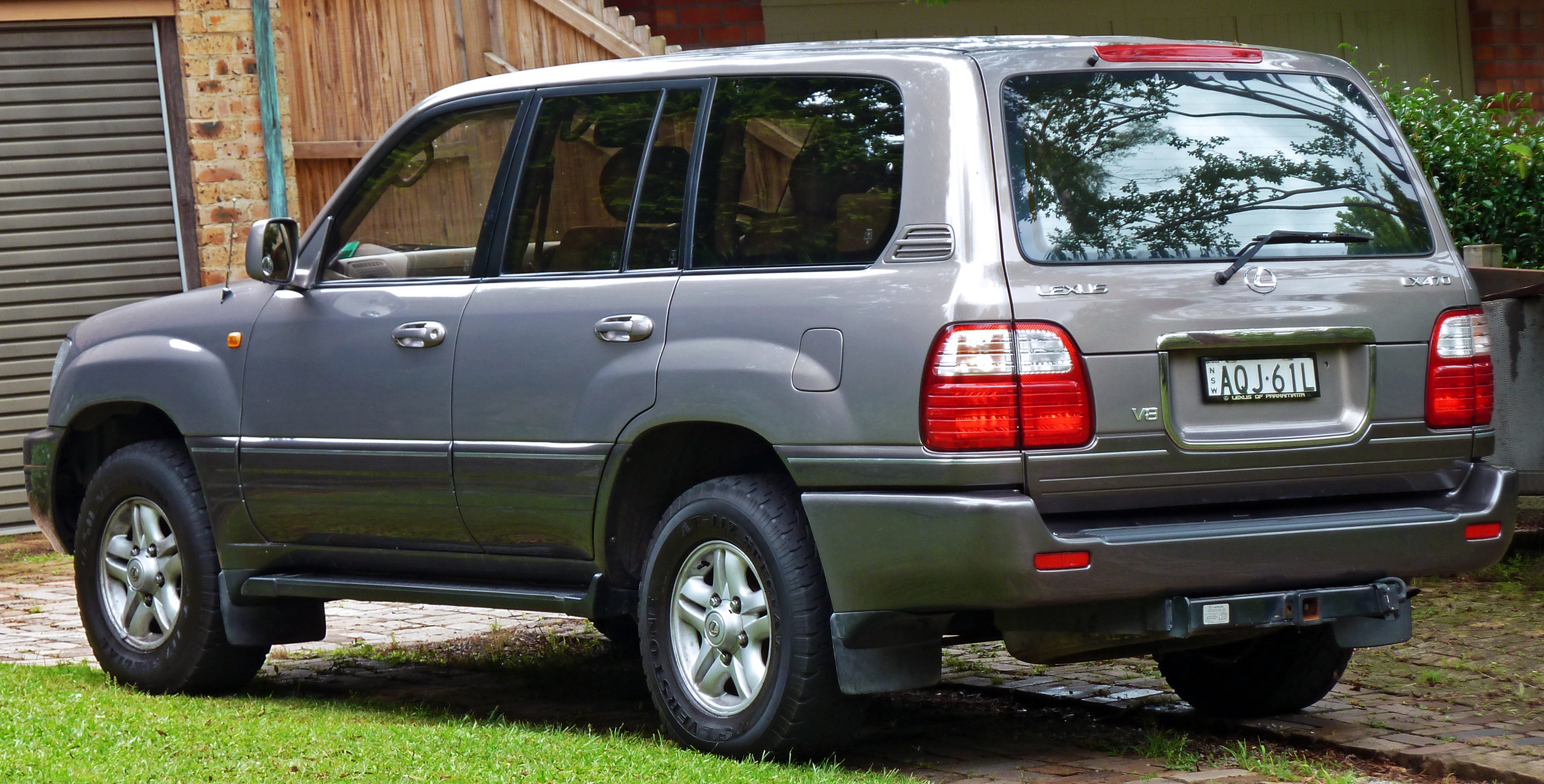
1998–2002 Lexus LX 470

The front gained independent suspension, and the optional electronic locking front and rear differentials were dropped – although the rear locking differential was still available in Canada in 1998–1999. Suspension included Adjustable Height Control (AHC) hydraulic suspension and Adaptive Variable Suspension (AVS). The AHC could raise the vehicle for off-roading and return to a normal driving height reducing the center of gravity and wind resistance. The lowest setting for when the vehicle was stopped allowed for easier entry, exit and loading. AVS alters shock absorber firmness in under 2.5 milliseconds at each wheel, individually selecting from a range of 64 settings depending on road conditions and driver input such as steering-wheel activity, braking and acceleration. The AVS system used a switch for the driver's preferences including "normal", "comfort" and "sport" modes.

Nakamichi stereo with in-dash six-disc CD changer was optional from 1998, and became standard in 2000. A DVD-based navigation system was offered starting in 2001 with the brand new standard Mark Levinson sound system. The navigation system would become standard from 2002. Electrochromic power folding side mirrors, and a smog sensor for the HVAC system were offered. For 2000 models, Vehicle Stability Control and brake assist were made standard, along with Toyota's new A-TRAC (Active Traction Control System).

=== 2002–2005 ===
During 2002 for the 2003 model year, Lexus introduced minor tweaks to the exterior, a 5-speed transmission including larger standard 18-inch wheels, a new front bumper, etc. The interior was substantially overhauled, adopting the corresponding updates to the Land Cruiser's interior, and with Bluetooth and a backup camera now available. In the US, both were optional with the camera coupled with the navigation system, due to the shared screen. Lexus increased power from 172 kW (230 hp) to 175 kW (235 hp). The updated engine now met CARB ULEV-II emission standards. Lexus added front row side torso airbags and side curtain airbags, electronic brakeforce distribution and rain-sensing windshield wipers as standard. An 11-speaker Mark Levinson premium sound system and a DVD Rear-Seat Entertainment System (RSES) were made optional. Other new features included Lexus Link, an emergency service similar to GM's Onstar, in North America.

The Night View infrared camera safety system was offered as an option in 2002, projecting information on the windshield using a head-up display; the driver could vary brightness using a dimmer knob. The 2003 LX 470 came with Variable Gear Ratio Steering (VGRS) system, varying steering ratios from 12.4 to 1 to 18.0 to 1 (previously fixed at 19.8 to 1), allowing the driver to apply less steering input to maneuver in tight places such as parking lots. By changing the ratio on the highway, minor adjustments made by the driver would not create excessive vehicular movement.

=== 2005–2007 ===
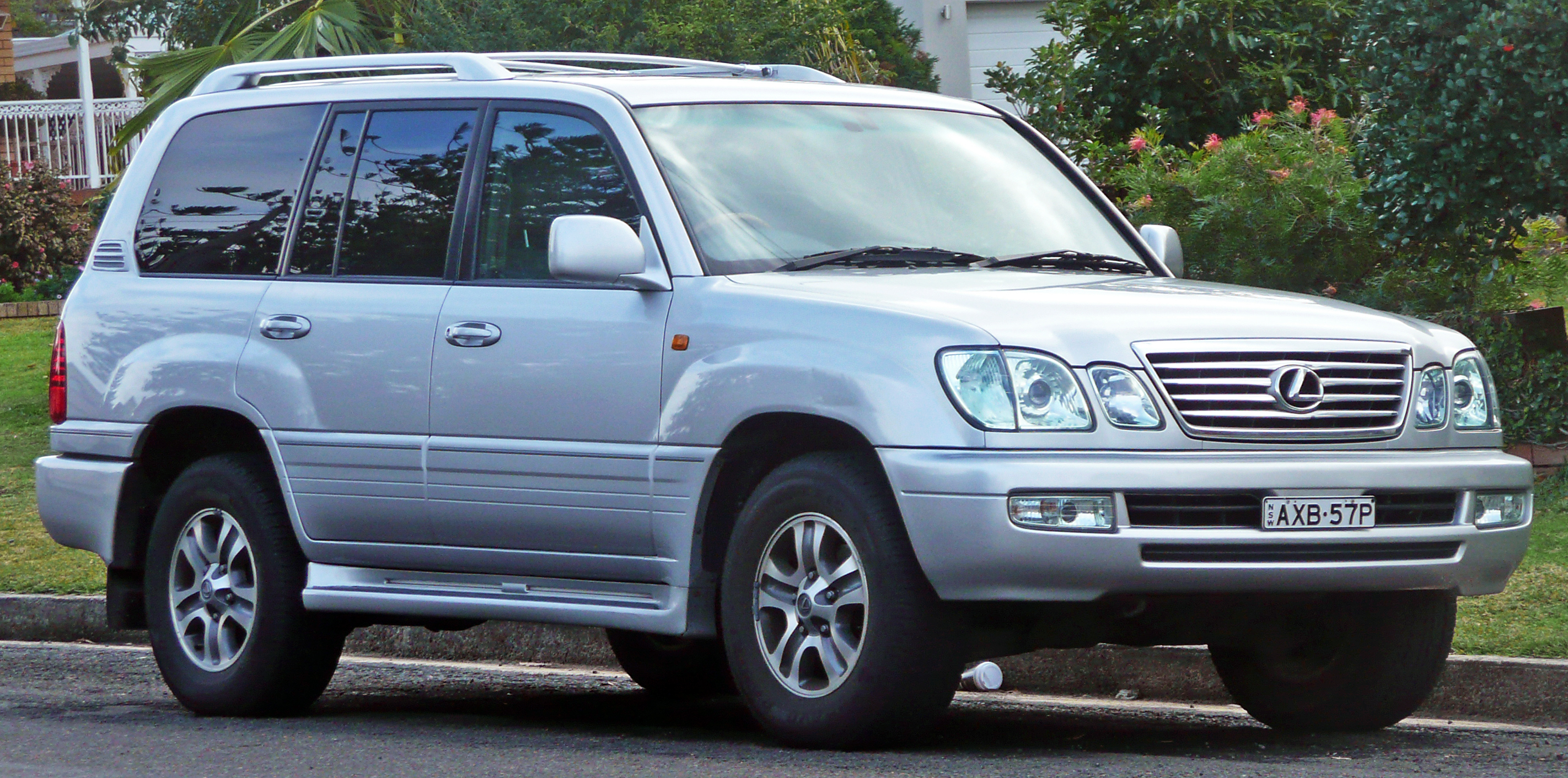

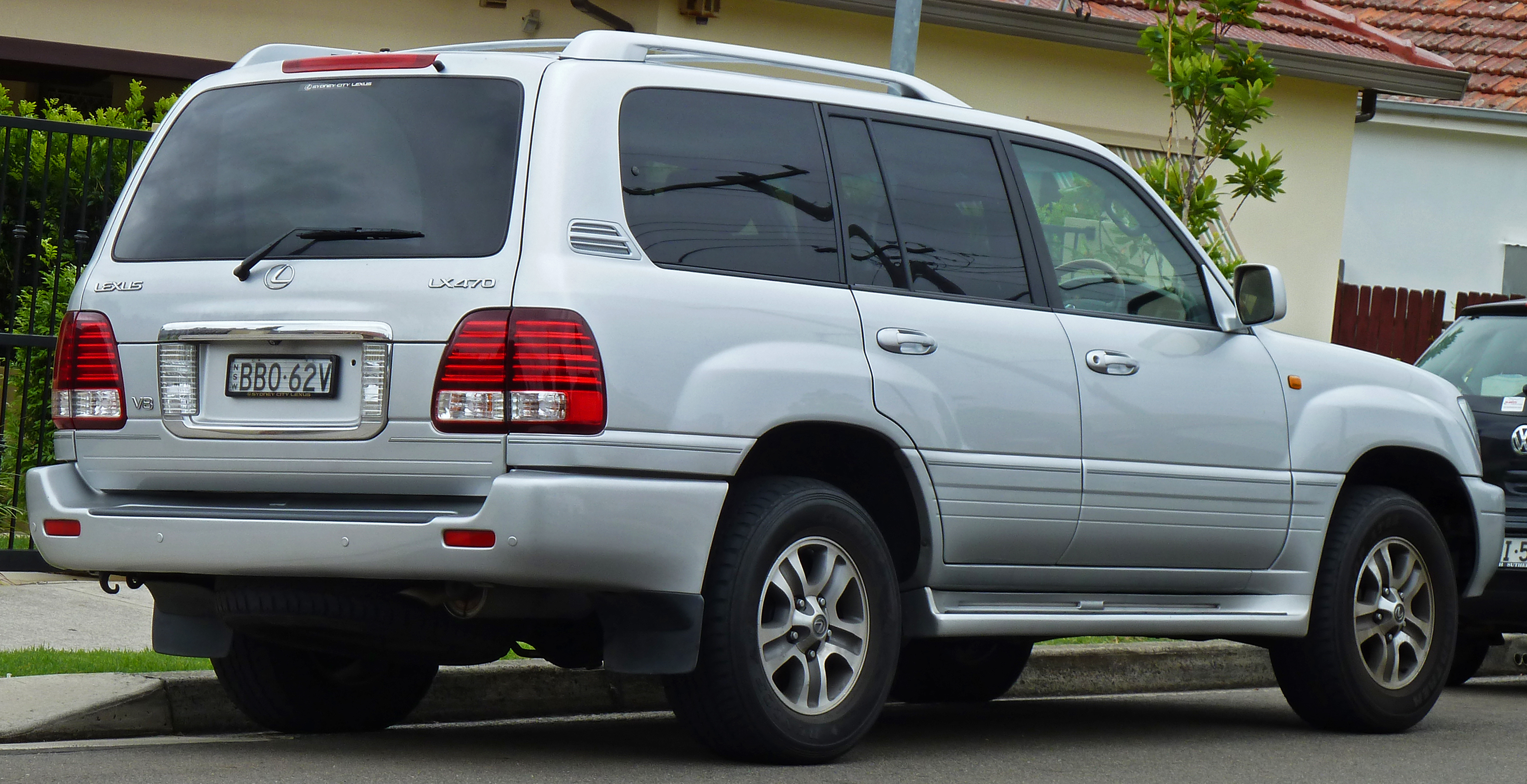
2005–2007 Lexus LX 470

In 2005 for the 2006 model year, a refresher included LED tail lamps, adding VVT-i to the engine and increasing its power to 205 kW (275 hp). During 2006, for the final model year, 2007, Lexus produced 400 "Limited Edition" LX 470s with Black Onyx paint, stone leather interior, and specialized badging and scuff plates.

Several awards were made for the J100 series:

- The LX 470 was named by J.D. Power and Associates as the best luxury SUV in initial quality in 2000, 2002, and 2004.
- Kelley Blue Book gave the LX 470 its Best to Hold Value Award in 1998, 1999, and 2000.
- In a 2000 Edmunds.com comparison with four other premium SUVs, the LX 470 took first place.
- In a 2003 Edmunds.com comparison, the LX 470's Mark Levinson audio system and navigation system were the highest rated in their respective categories.
- In 2005, J.D. Power named the LX 470 the most reliable luxury SUV over a three-year period in its Vehicle Dependability Study.

=== Gallery ===
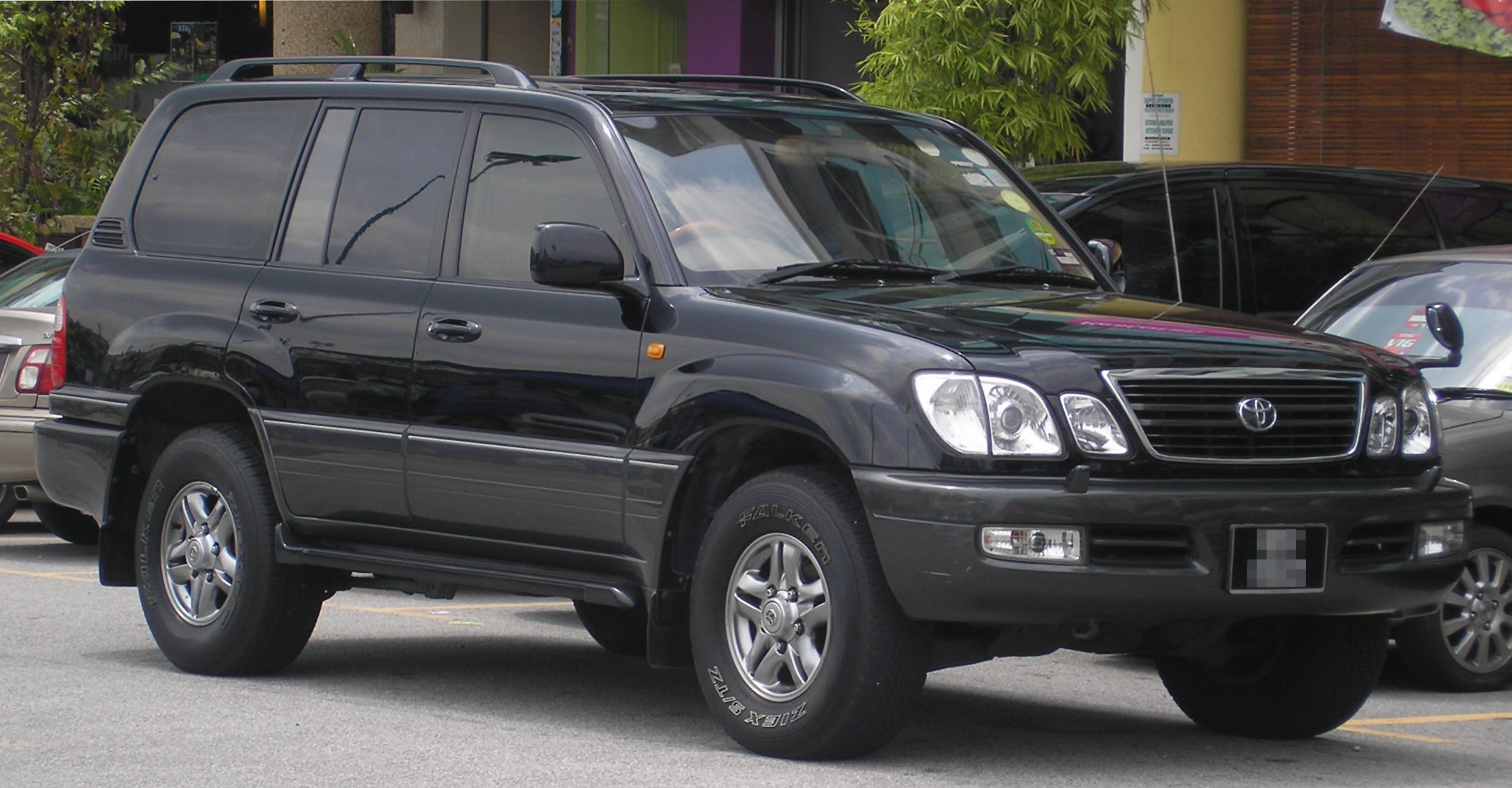
1998-2002 Toyota Land Cruiser Cygnus

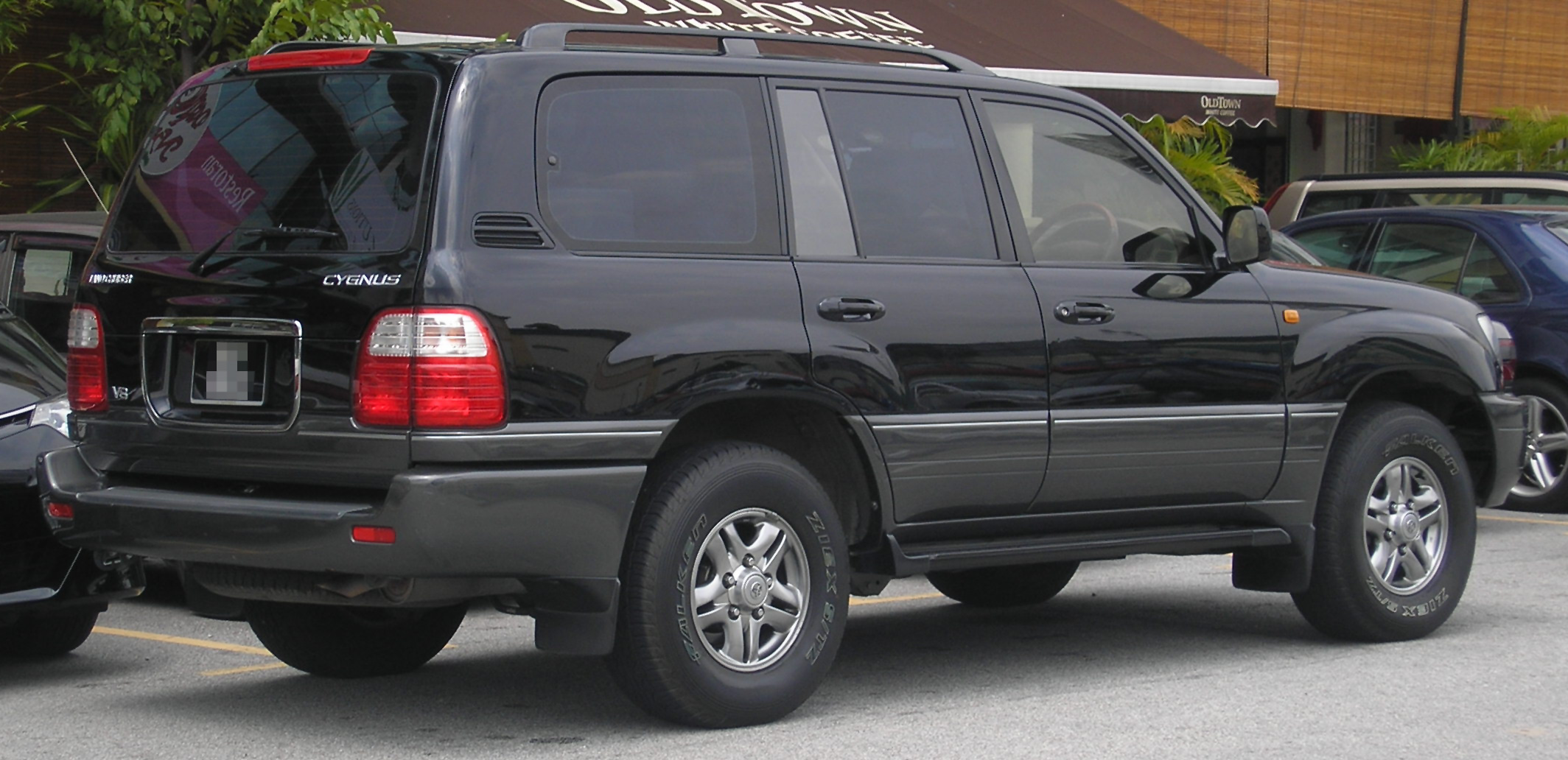
1998-2002 Toyota Land Cruiser Cygnus

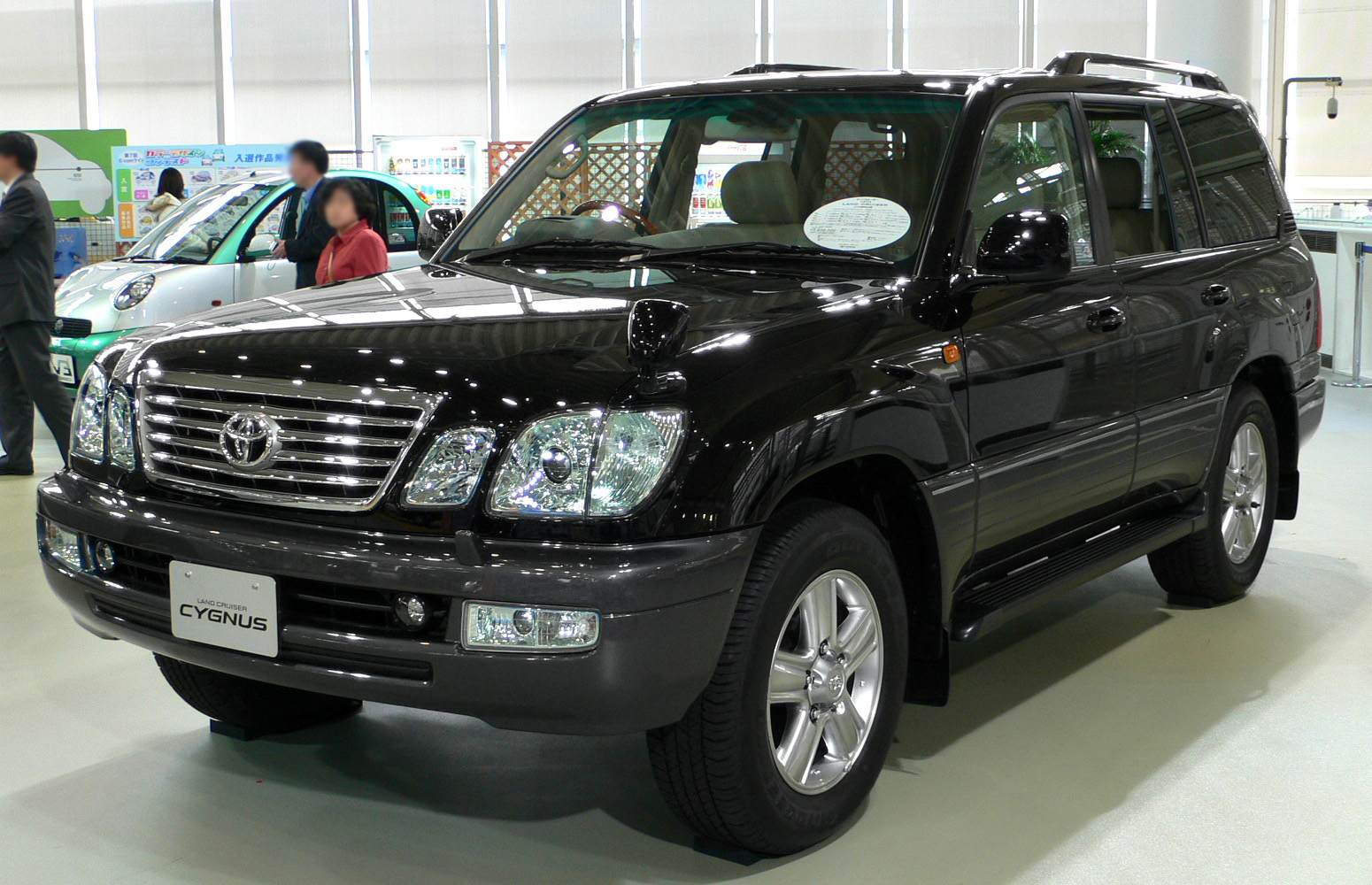
2005–2007 Toyota Land Cruiser Cygnus (Japan)

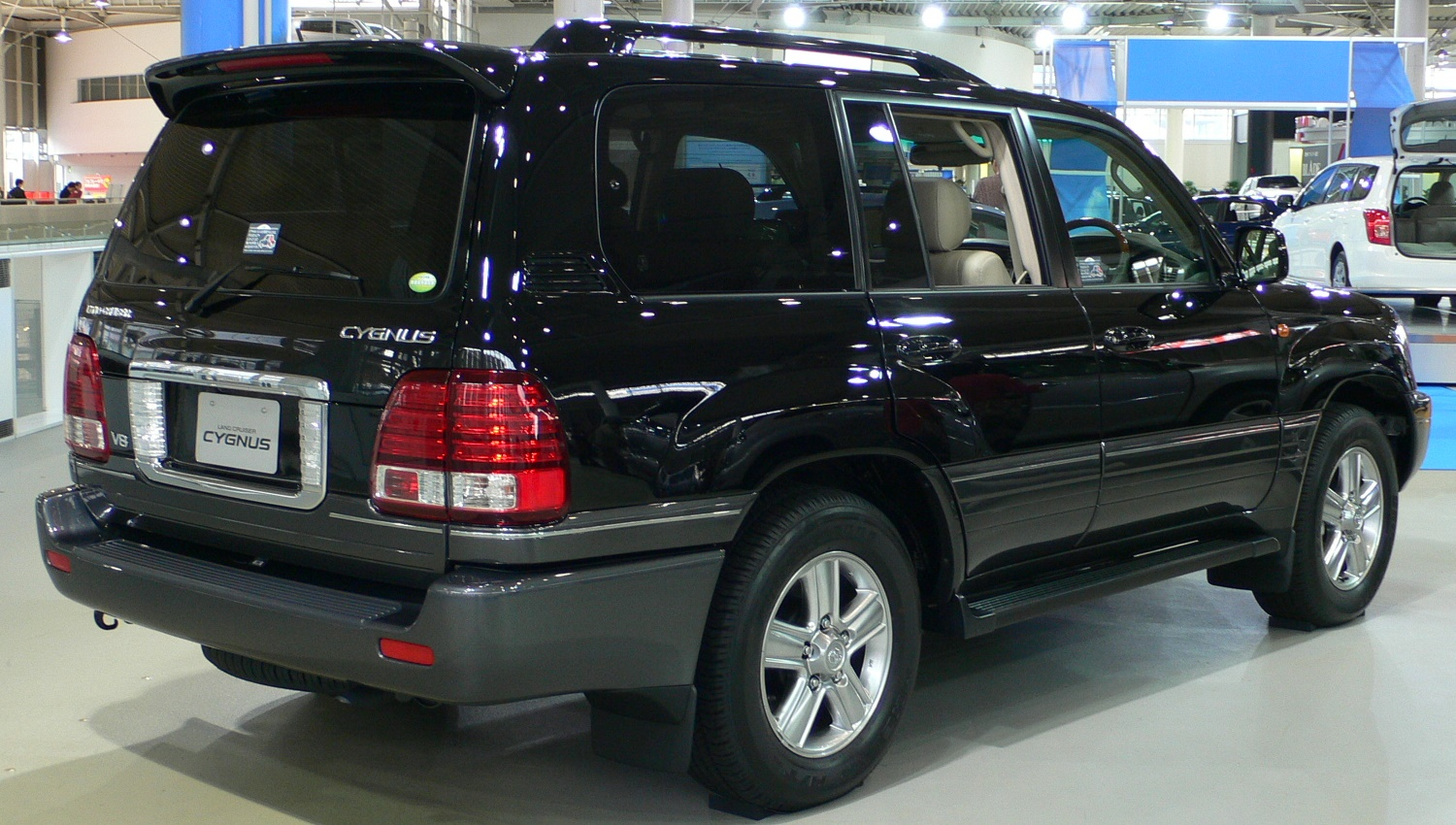
2005–2007 Toyota Land Cruiser Cygnus (Japan)

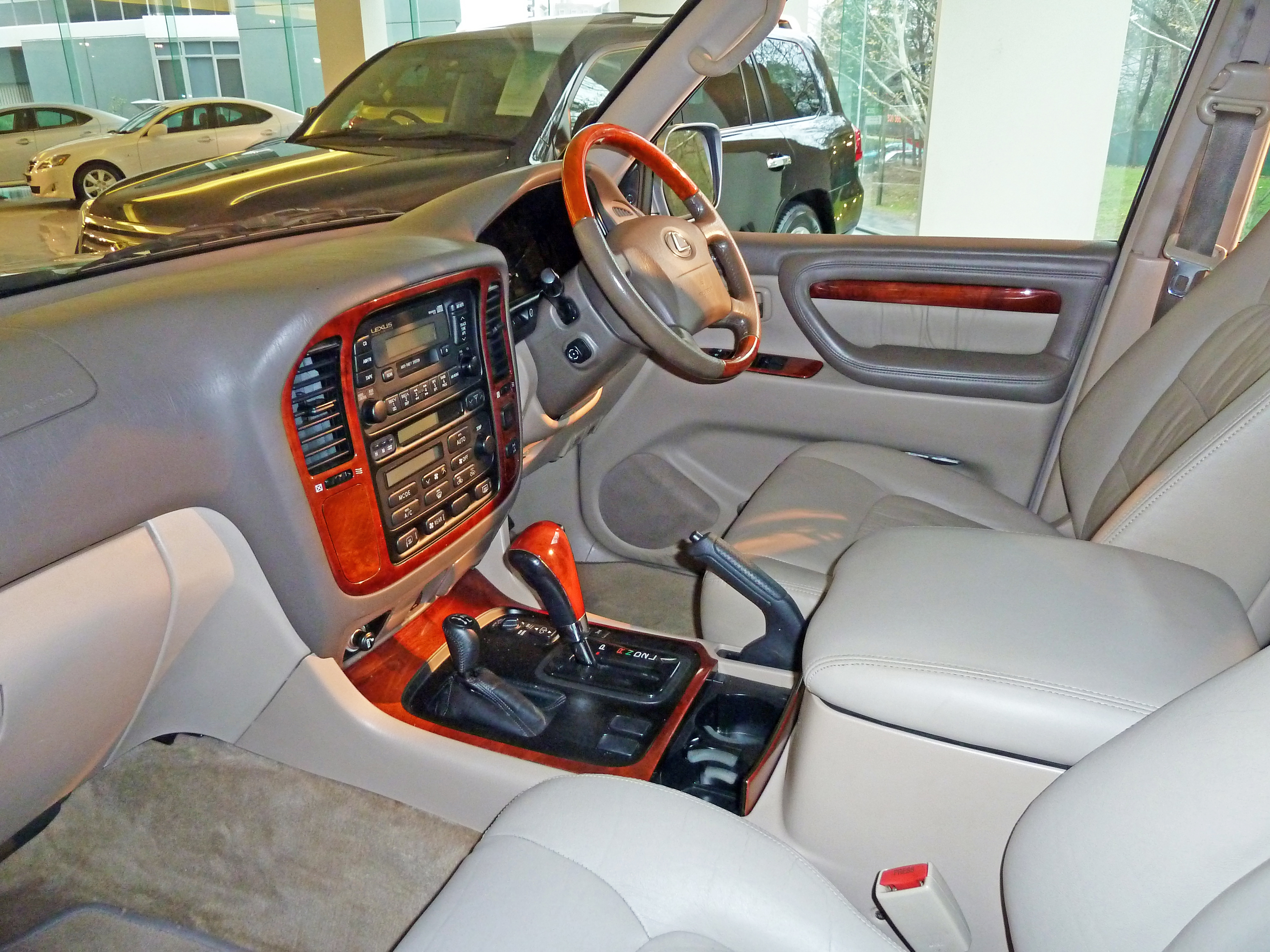
1998–2002 Lexus LX 470 interior

=== Engines ===
Model	Engine	Power	Max. Torque	Region	Years
LX 470	2UZ-FE V8 4,663 cc (284.6 cu in)	175–200 kW (235–268 hp) at 4,800 rpm	445 N⋅m (328 lbf⋅ft) at 3,400 rpm		1998-2005

== Third generation (J200; 2007) ==
Third generation
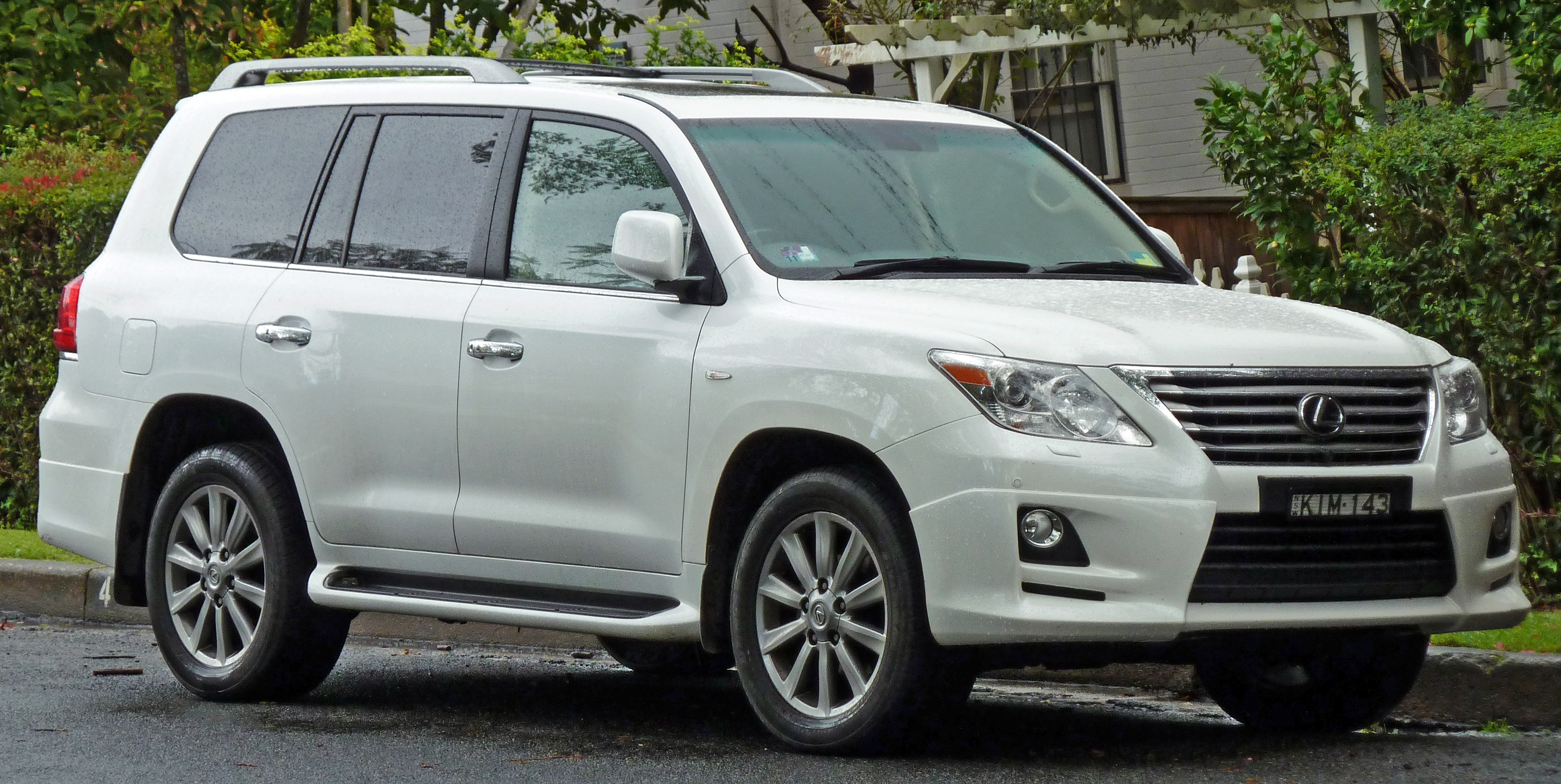
- 2010 Lexus LX 570 Sport (Australia)

Overview
- Model code: J200
- Also called: Toyota Land Cruiser (J200)
- Production: November 2007 – October 2021
- Model years: 2008–2021
- Designer: Kengo Matsumoto, Shinichi Hiranaka and Takanori Ito; Takanori Ito (2012 facelift)

Body and chassis
- Platform: Toyota F1
- Related: Toyota Tundra (XK50); Toyota Land Cruiser (J200); Toyota Sequoia (XK60)

Powertrain
- Engine: Gasoline: 4.6 L 1UR-FE V8 (LX 460; URJ202); 4.7 L 2UZ-FE V8 (LX 470; UZJ201); 5.7 L 3UR-FE V8 (LX 570; URJ201); Diesel: 4.5 L 1VD-FTV turbo V8 (LX 450d; VDJ201)
- Transmission: 6-speed AB60F automatic (2007–2021); 8-speed AE80F automatic (2015–2021)

Dimensions
- Wheelbase: 2,850 mm (112.2 in)
- Length: 5,005 mm (197.0 in)
- Width: 1,970 mm (77.6 in)
- Height: 1,865 mm (73.4 in)
- Curb weight: 2,685–2,750 kg (5,919–6,063 lb)

=== 2007–2010 ===
On April 4, 2007, Lexus debuted the 2008 model year LX 570 at the New York International Auto Show. It was a complete redesign, and the first version to be debuted before its expected Land Cruiser counterpart. The design by Shinichi Hiranaka was approved in 2004, who also did the design update approved in 2010. It has a new UL EV-II certified 5.7 L 3UR-FE V8 engine. Power output is 286 kW (383 hp) with 546 N⋅m (403 lb⋅ft) of torque. The more powerful engine helps give an increased towing capacity of up to 3,900 kg (8,500 lb). The engine is tied to a six-speed sequential-shift automatic transmission with an all-new 4WD system which uses a Torsen center differential. Development began on both the Land Cruiser (J200) and Lexus LX equivalent in 2002. The final design was approved in 2004, with testing being conducted into early 2007 on development prototypes and late 2007 on pre-production models. The final design patent for the J200 series Lexus LX was filed on March 27, 2007.

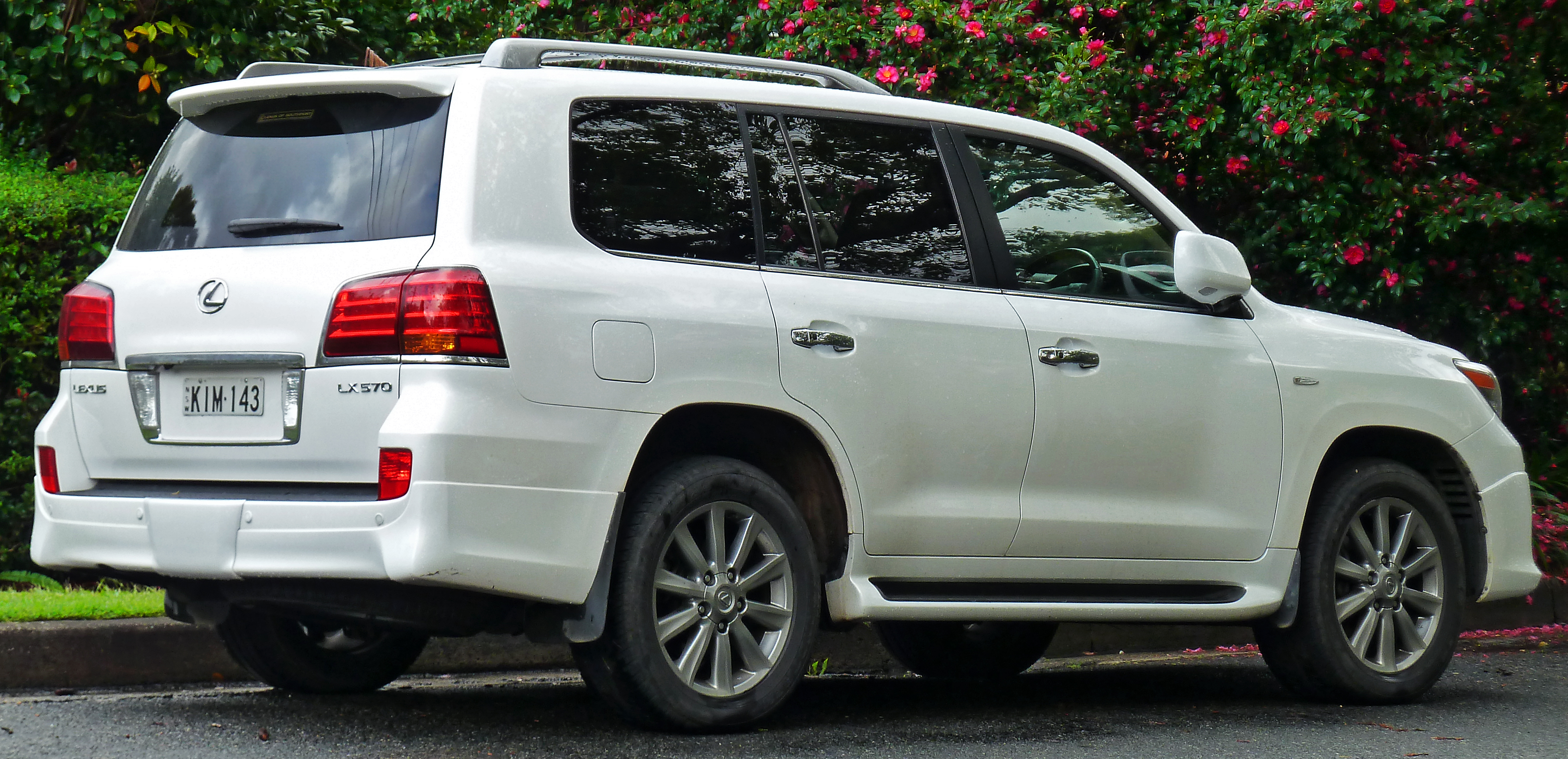
Rear view

The LX 570 is 102 mm (4 in) longer overall and 25 mm (1 in) wider, while retaining the same wheelbase. It loses the plastic lower body side cladding leaving the paint exposed. A third of the frame's body mass is made from high-tensile steel, along with the entire B-pillar, and all three crossmembers are hydroformed steel. Like the Toyota Tundra the tow hitch is integrated into the frame. The front suspension now uses double wishbones, replacing the torsion beam, which gives 230 mm (9 in) of suspension travel, while the rear continues to use a multi-link suspension with a solid rear axle for strength and durability. The LX platform has logged 240,000 test kilometers through subtropical forests, the Australian Outback and American deserts.

The LX 570 comes standard with 20-inch wheels, a four-wheel electro-hydraulic suspension with an updated six-setting AHC system that can raise the vehicle by 76 mm (3 in) or lower it by 51 mm (2 in) from its normal ride height using a knob in the center console. The front suspension's air bag spring rates are variable, but not continuously like a fully active suspension arrangement. The AVS provides more immediate damper firmness adjustments that are diagonally cross-linked through a mechanical system using hydraulic fluid, similar to the 4Runner's X-REAS system.

Other performance features include a Crawl Control (more advanced version of Downhill Assist Control) system that negotiates off-road obstacles in both forward and reverse at low speeds by automatically providing throttle and braking inputs for less experienced off-road drivers: an interior lever allows the driver to reduce speed. A multi-terrain anti-lock braking system gives shorter stopping distances on surfaces such as sand or gravel. Hill-start Assist Control (HAC) prevents rolling backwards on hills or slippery surfaces.

The interior includes amenities, standard and optional, featured in the 2007 LS 460, such as semi-aniline leather seats, four-zone climate control, a 19-speaker 450 Watt Mark Levinson surround-sound stereo system with hard-drive memory storage, a hard-drive-based navigation system, XM satellite radio with NavTraffic as standard, a two-piece power liftgate/tailgate and Lexus Intuitive Park Assist, sonar parking assistance. Other features include Bubinga wood trim, a center console cooler for storage of cold drinks, power sliding rear seats, power third row seats, and a 229 millimetres (9 in) DVD rear-seat entertainment system.

It also has the updated Lexus fifth-generation hard-drive-based navigation system with an 8-inch high-resolution VGA display. Lexus' keyless SmartAccess with an ultra-thin "smart card" key is standard with 10 airbags including knee airbags for driver and front passenger and second row side torso airbags, and the Adaptive Front-lighting System (AFS) is standard, while the Pre-Collision System (PCS) and Dynamic Radar Cruise Control systems are options. Active front headrests debut this Lexus safety feature for the first time on an SUV in the U.S. A new Wide-view Front and Side Monitor system uses a camera mounted on the grille giving a 180-degree view in front and a camera mounted on the passenger side of the side mirror helps eliminate blind spots at low speeds useful in parking lots or off-road adventures. Night View was discontinued.

In 2009, the LX 570 received J.D. Power's top score in its Initial Quality Study.

=== 2010–2012 ===
In 2010 for the 2011 model year, Lexus introduced a mild facelift with a new front bumper, and for sports models a stick-on body kit on the front and rear bumpers. The new front bumper gave the effect of the new Lexus "spindle" grille without redesigning any of the major bodywork components. This was the first year to have the heated steering wheel option.

=== 2012–2015 ===
A more substantial facelift arrived in 2012 for the 2013 model year, characterized by a new grille, bumpers, headlamps, tail lamp lenses and miscellaneous trim changes such as new wheel designs.

=== 2015–2021 ===
Another facelift was unveiled in August 2015 at the US Pebble Beach Concours d'Elegance. The update brought significant changes with an all-new interior, and the only exterior panels carried over were the doors and the roof.

This facelifted version of the LX is also the first LX model to be officially sold in Japan.

=== Gallery ===
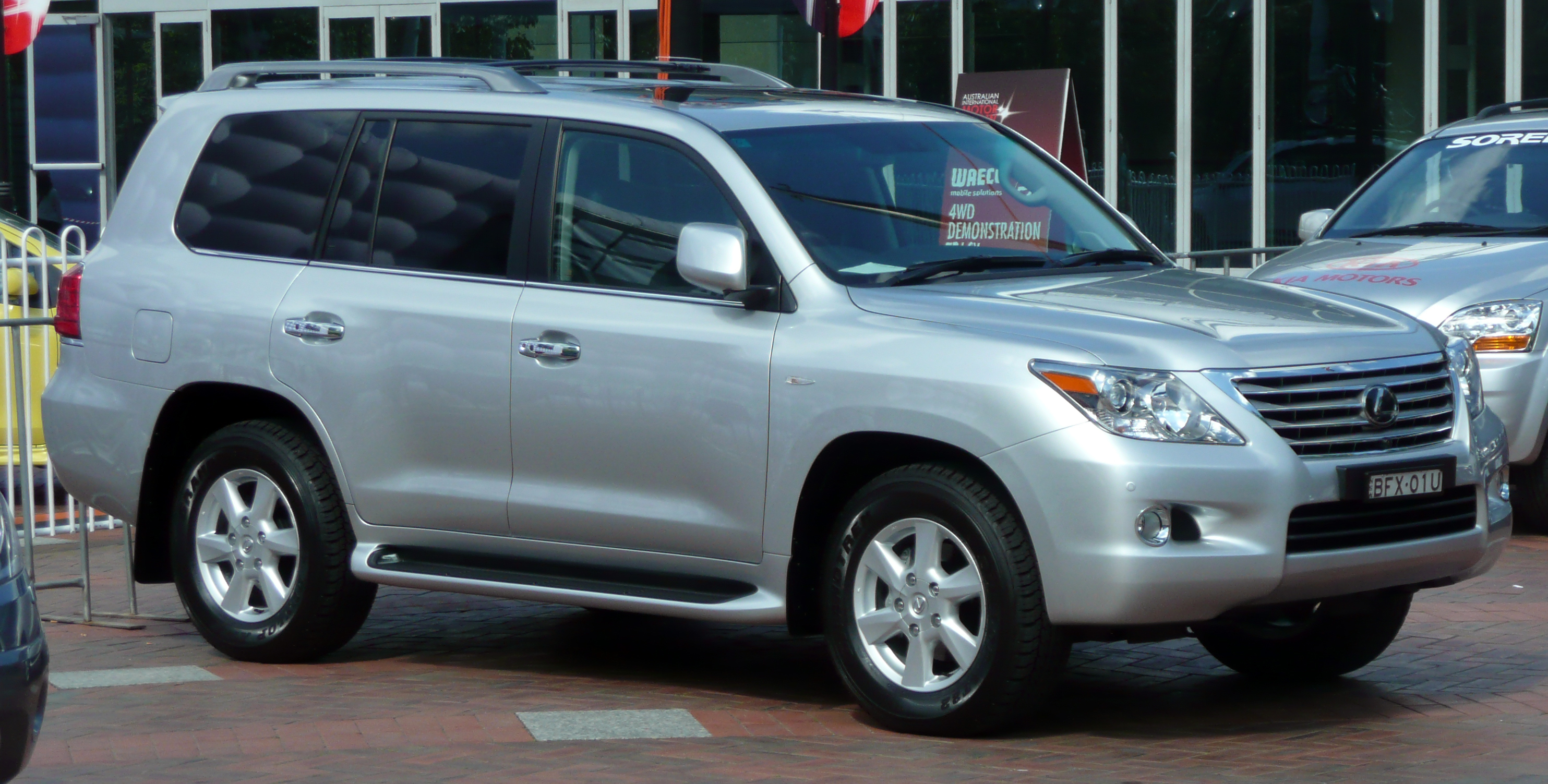
2007-2010 Pre-facelift Lexus LX 570 Prestige

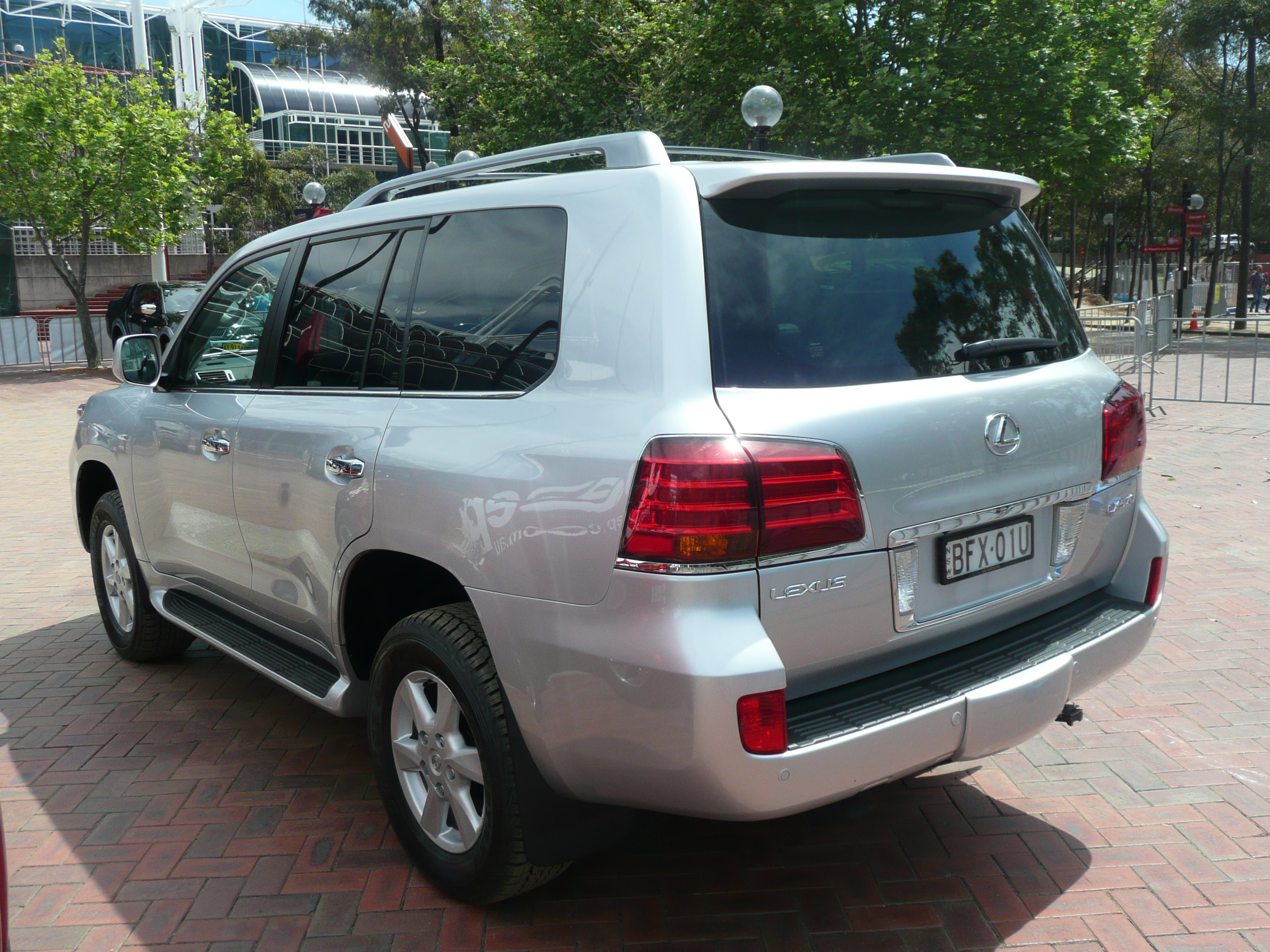
2007-2010 Pre-facelift Lexus LX 570 Prestige

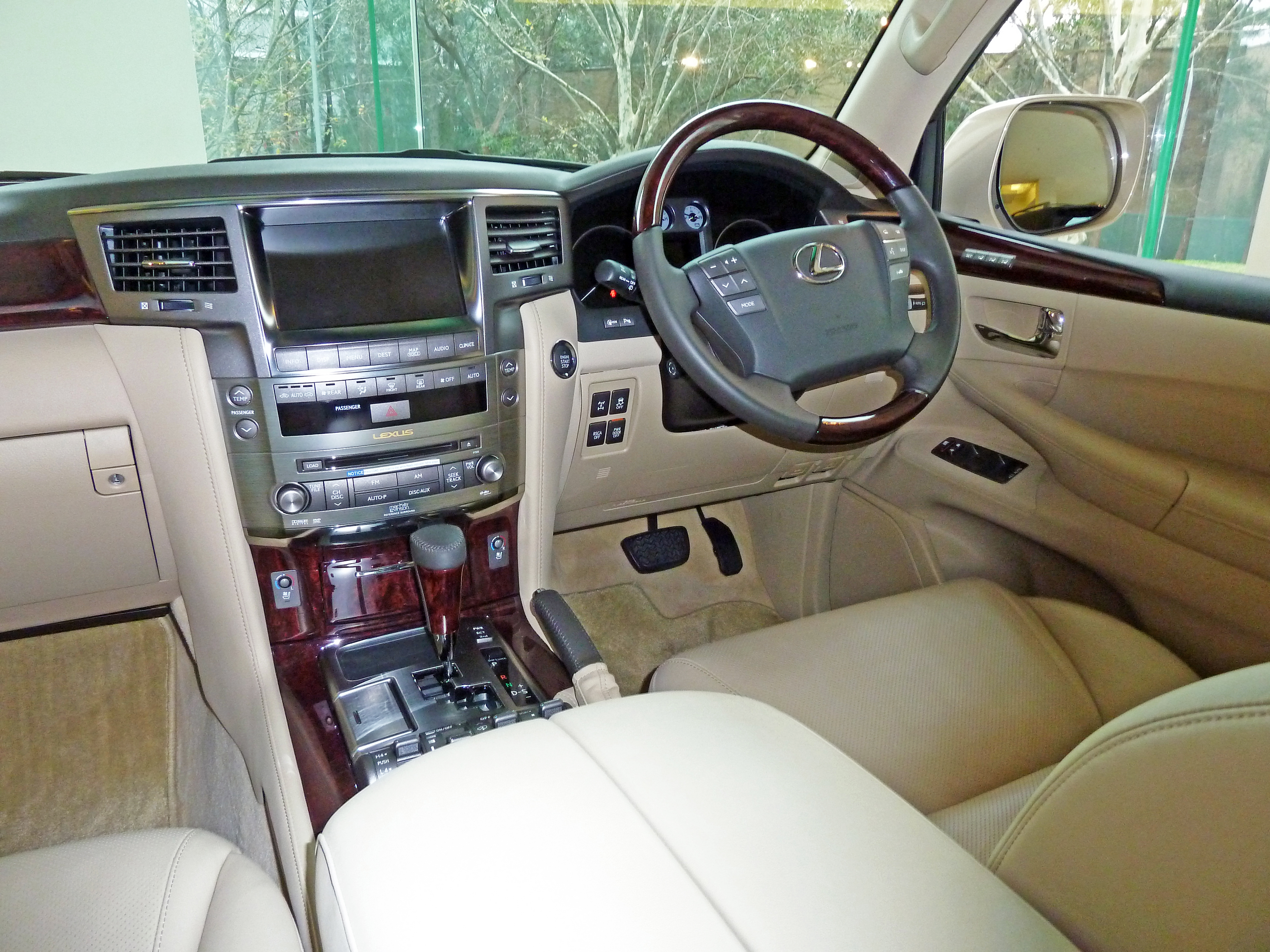
Pre-facelift interior

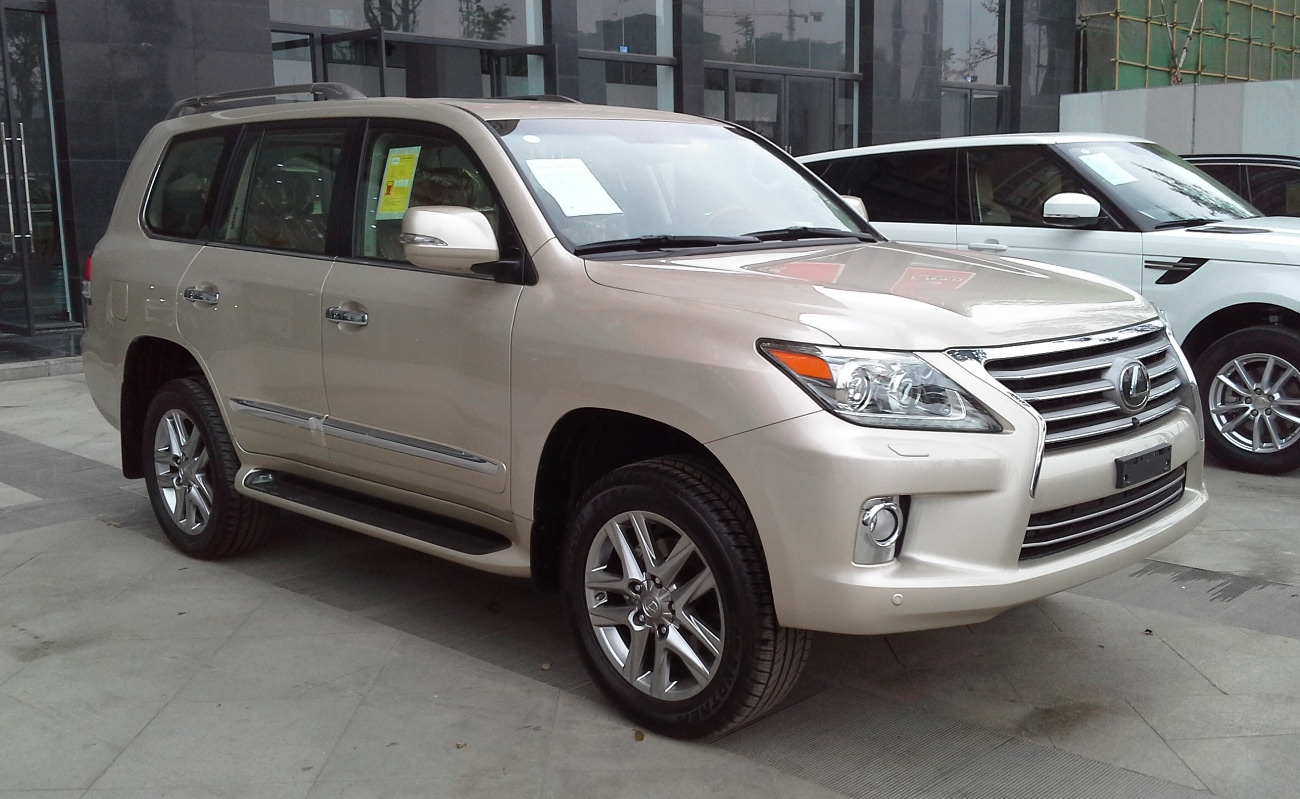
2012-2015 First facelift Lexus LX 570

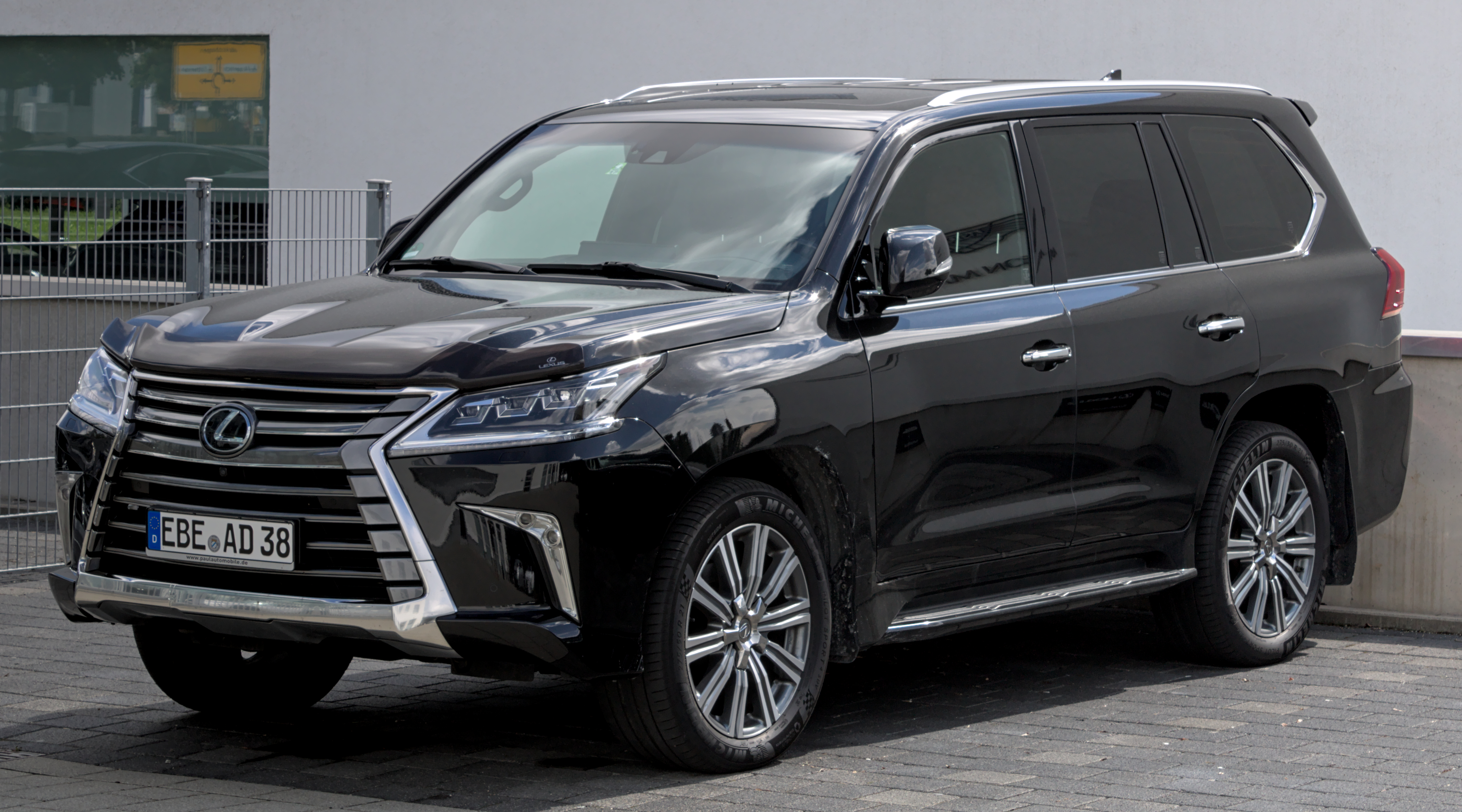
2015-2021 Second facelift LX 570

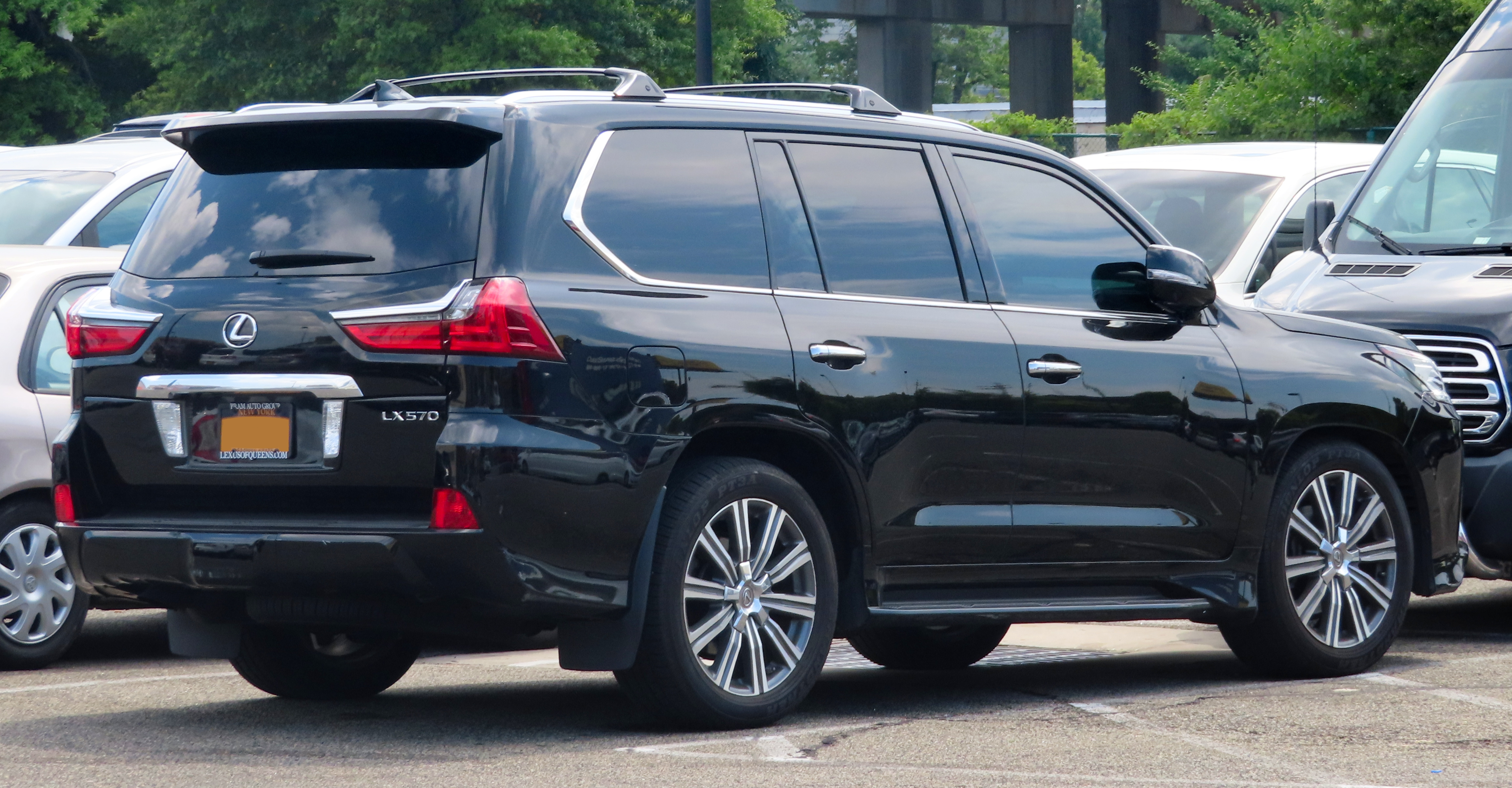
2015-2021 Second facelift LX 570

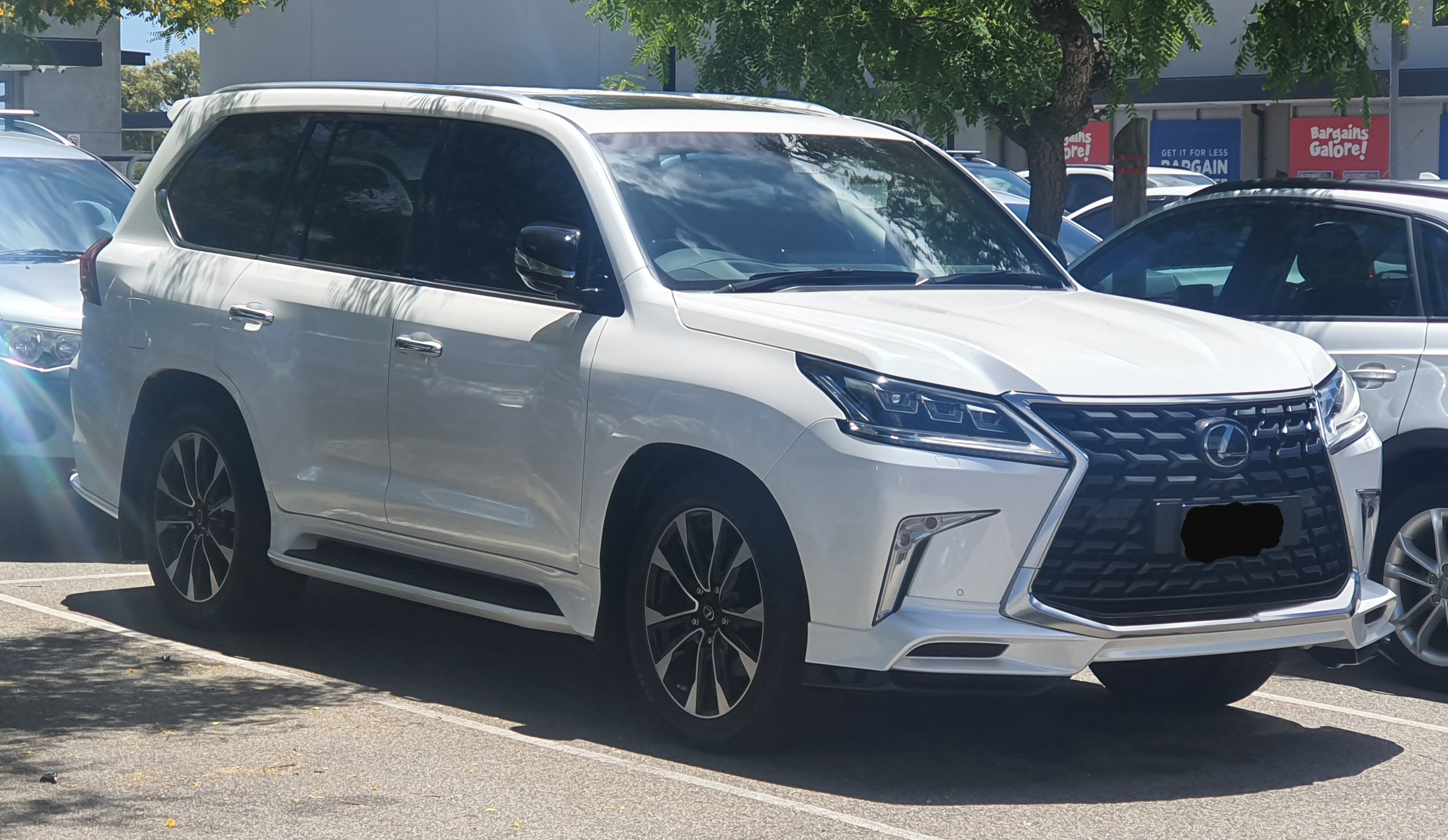
2015-2021 Second facelift LX 570 Sport

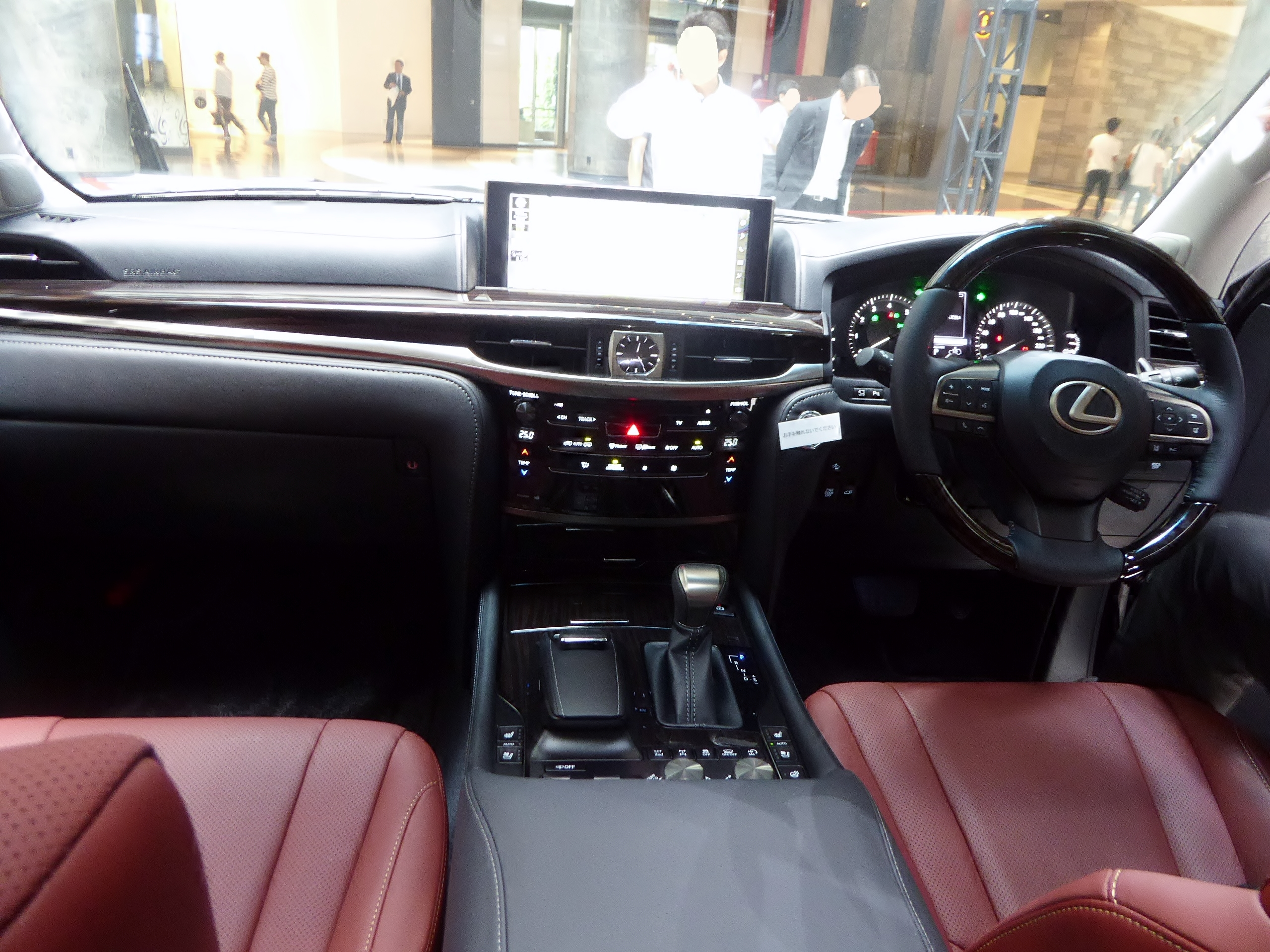
2015-2021 Second facelift interior

=== Engines ===
Model	Engine	Power	Max. Torque	Region	Years
LX 470	2UZ-FE V8 4,663 cc (284.6 cu in)	202 kW (271 hp) at 5,400 rpm	410 N⋅m (302 lbf⋅ft) at 3,400 rpm	Hong Kong only	2007–2012
LX 460	1UR-FE V8 4,608 cc (281.2 cu in)	233 kW (313 hp) at 5,500 rpm	460 N⋅m (339 lbf⋅ft) at 3,400 rpm	Hong Kong only	2012–2014
LX 570	3UR-FE V8 5,663 cc (345.6 cu in)	270 kW (362 hp) at 5,600 rpm	530 N⋅m (391 lbf⋅ft) at 3,200 rpm	GCC, Australia, Russia, Ukraine, Armenia (since 2008), Kazakhstan, China, Taiwan, Indonesia, Philippines, Chile, South Africa, New Zealand, Vietnam (since Dec 2013), Malaysia (since Dec 2015)	2007–2021
LX 570	3UR-FE V8 5,663 cc (345.6 cu in)	277 kW (371 hp) at 5,600 rpm	534 N⋅m (394 lb⋅ft) at 3,200 rpm	Japan	2015–2021
LX 570	3UR-FE V8 5,663 cc (345.6 cu in)	286 kW (383 hp) at 5,600 rpm	546 N⋅m (403 lb⋅ft) at 3,600 rpm	United States, Canada	2007–2021
LX 570 Supercharged	3UR-FE V8 5,663 cc (345.6 cu in)	336 kW (450 hp) at 5,400 rpm	706 N⋅m (521 lb⋅ft) at 3,200 rpm	Middle East (special edition)	2014–2015
LX 450d	1VD-FTV V8 4,461 cc (272.2 cu in) Turbodiesel	200 kW (268 hp) at 3,600 rpm	650 N⋅m (479 lbf⋅ft) at 1,600–2,800 rpm	Russia, Ukraine, Paraguay, New Zealand, South Africa, Saudi Arabia, Armenia, Georgia (since 2018), India (since 2017), Australia (since April 2018)	2015–2021

== Fourth generation (J310; 2021) ==
Fourth generation
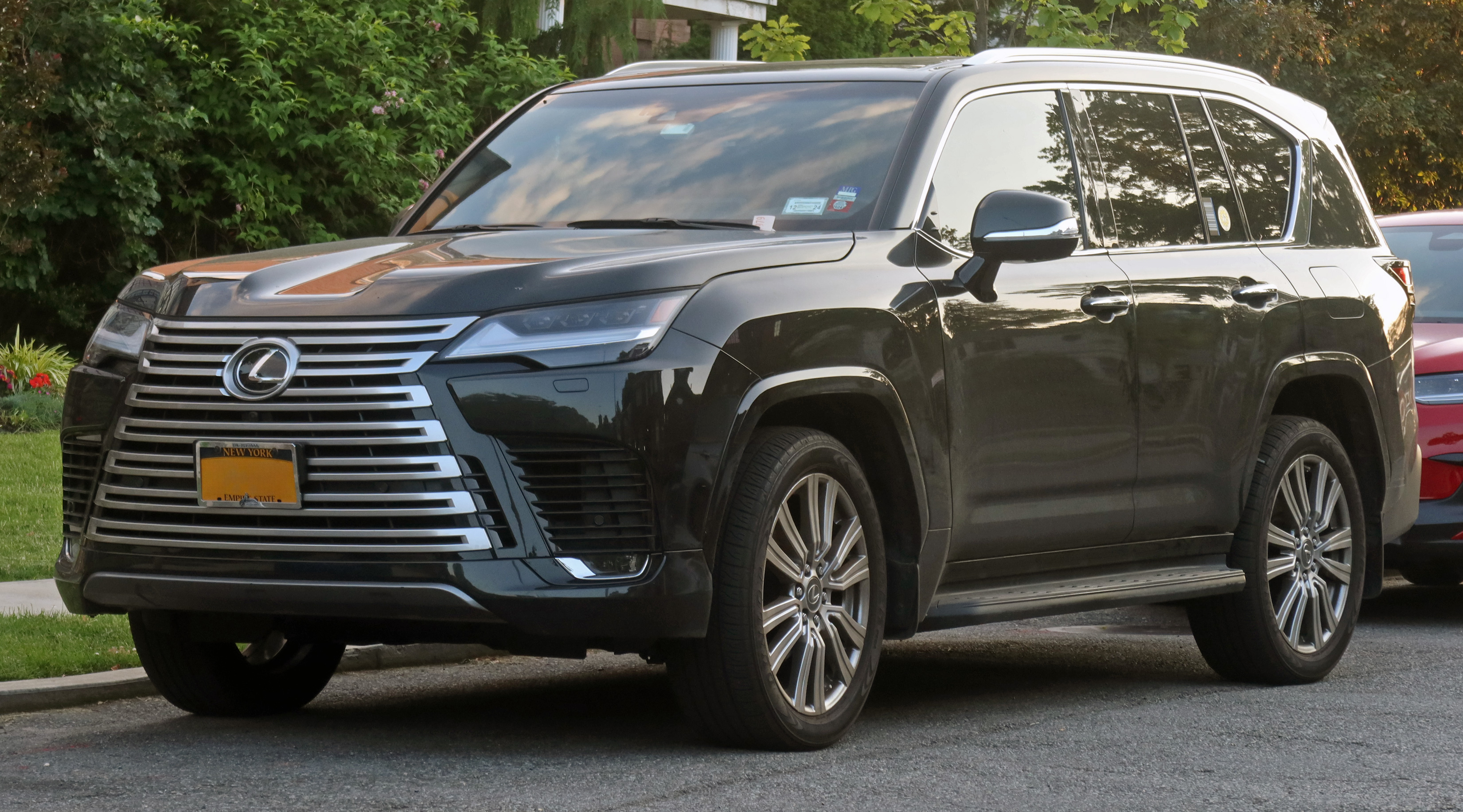
- Lexus LX 600 (VJA310, North America)

Overview
- Model code: J310
- Production: October 2021 – present
- Model years: 2022–present

Body and chassis
- Platform: TNGA: GA-F
- Related: Toyota Land Cruiser (J300); Toyota Sequoia (XK80); Toyota Tundra (XK70)

Powertrain
- Engine: Gasoline: 3.4 L V35A-FTS twin-turbo V6 (LX 600; VJA310); Gasoline hybrid: 3.4 L V35A-FTS twin-turbo V6 (LX 700h; VJH310); Diesel: 3.3 L F33A-FTV twin-turbo V6 (LX 500d; FJA310)
- Electric motor: 36 kW (48 hp; 49 PS) AC permanent magnet synchronous
- Power output: 305 kW (409 hp; 415 PS) (V35A-FTS); 341 kW (457 hp; 464 PS) (V35A-FTS hybrid); 225–227 kW (302–304 hp; 306–309 PS) (F33A-FTV)
- Transmission: 10-speed AWR10L65 "Direct Shift" automatic
- Hybrid drivetrain: Parallel (LX 700h)

Dimensions
- Wheelbase: 2,850 mm (112.2 in)
- Length: 5,085–5,230 mm (200.2–205.9 in)
- Width: 1,990 mm (78.3 in)
- Height: 1,855–1,895 mm (73.0–74.6 in)
- Curb weight: 2,575–2,720 kg (5,677–5,997 lb)

The fourth-generation LX was unveiled on October 13, 2021, which is based on the J300 series Land Cruiser. Unlike the corresponding Land Cruiser, the fourth-generation LX is available in North America. For the first time, two twin-turbocharged V6 engines are offered instead of V8s: a 3.4-liter gasoline unit for the LX 600, and a 3.3-liter diesel unit for the LX 500d, both mated to a 10-speed automatic transmission.

The "F Sport" trim is offered for the first time, replacing the previous "Sport" trim. The "VIP/Executive/Ultra Luxury" trim with four individual seats is also available. The "Offroad" trim with three locking differentials is available exclusively in Japan.

On October 10, 2024, Lexus unveiled the LX 700h Overtrail edition, equipped with front and rear differential locks—alongside the standard center differential lock—making it the only LX variant to feature three locking differentials.

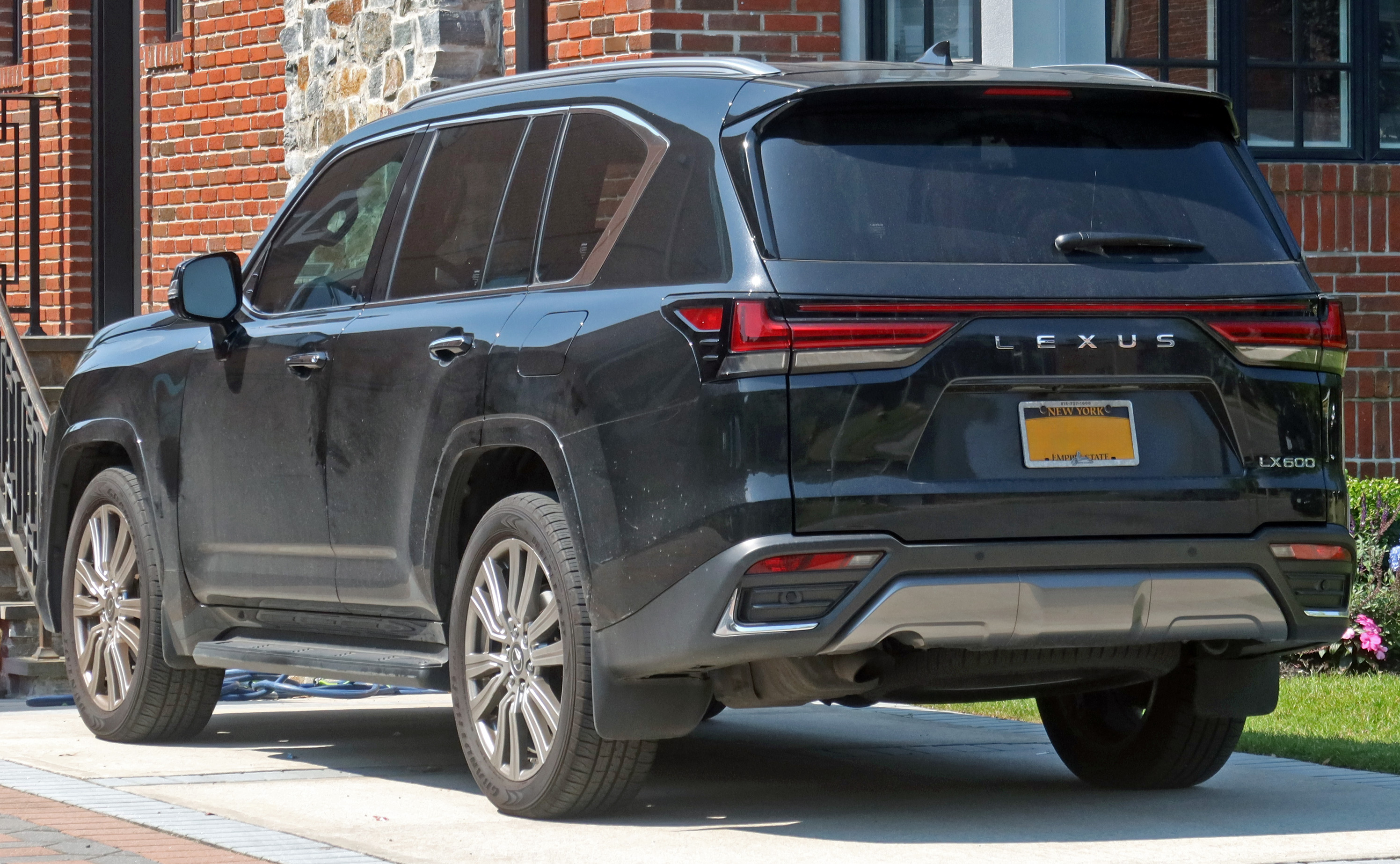
Rear

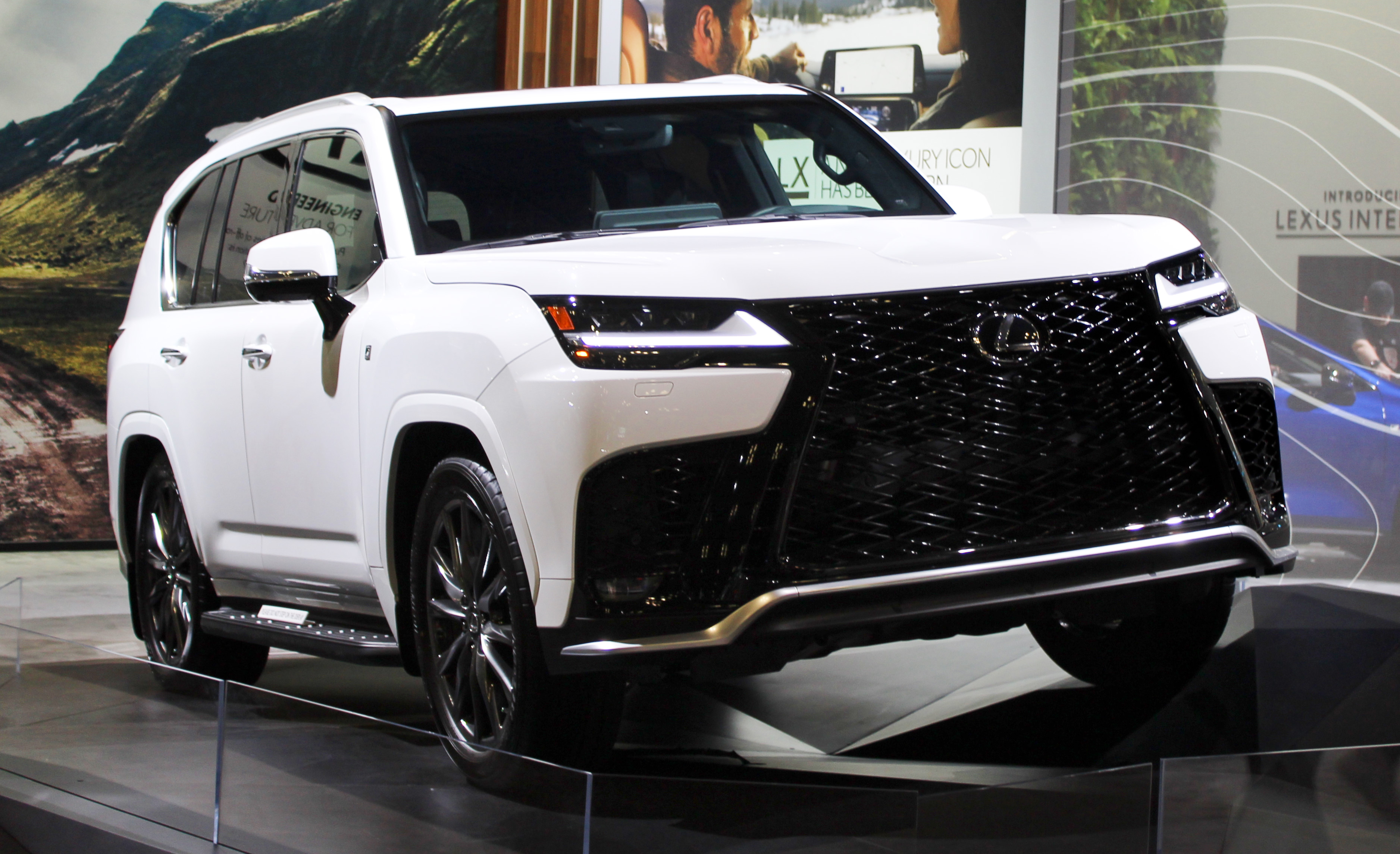
Lexus LX 600 F Sport (VJA310)

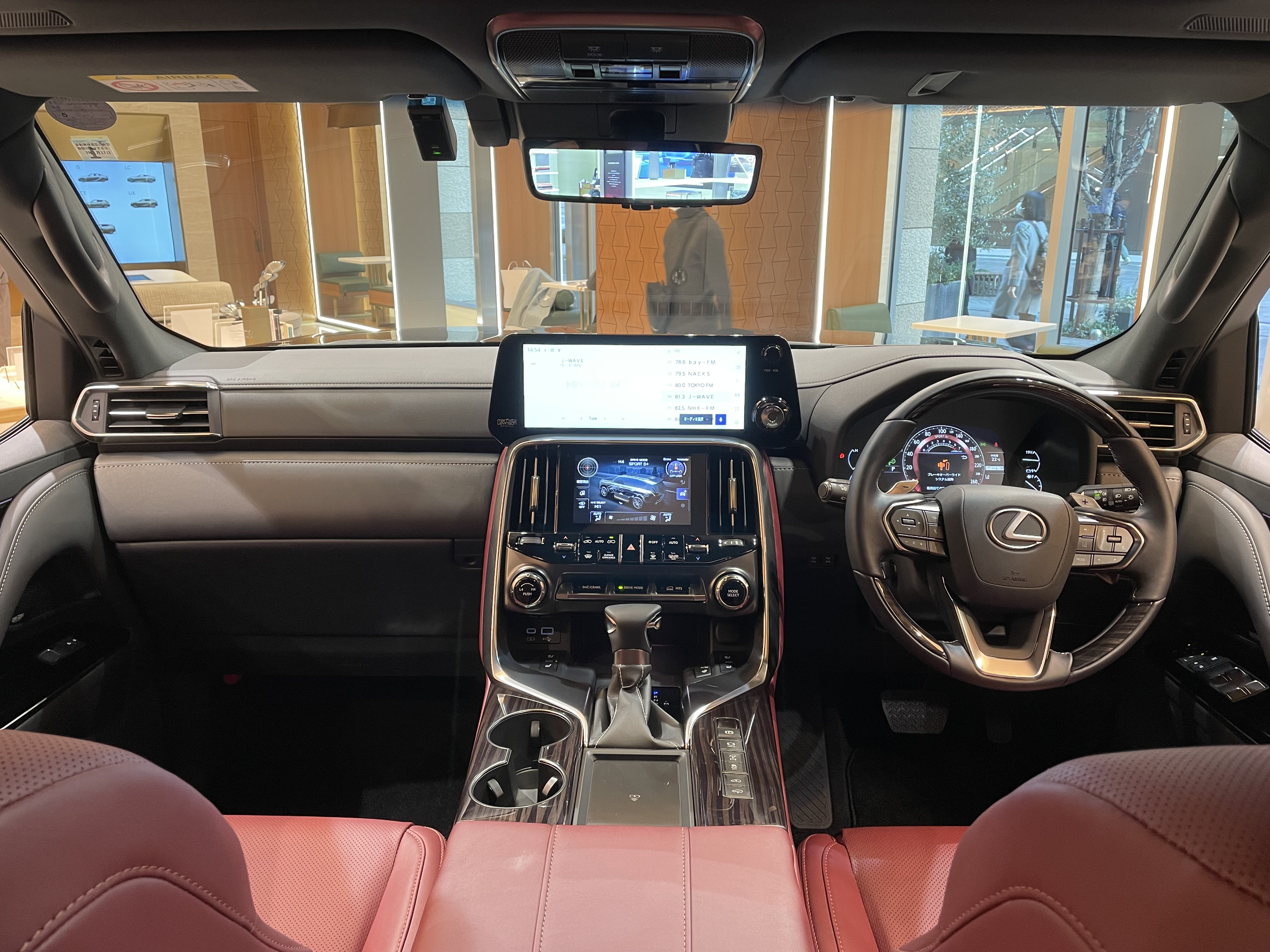
Interior

=== Engines ===
Model	Engine	Power	Max. Torque	Region	Years
LX 500d	F33A-FTV V6 3,345 cc (204.1 cu in)	227 kW (304 hp) at 4,000 rpm	700 N⋅m (516 lbf⋅ft) at 1,600-2,600 rpm		2022-present
LX 600	V35A-FTS V6 3,445 cc (210.2 cu in)	305 kW (409 hp) at 5,200 rpm	650 N⋅m (479 lbf⋅ft) at 2,000-3,600 rpm		2021-present
LX 700h	V35A-FTS V6 3,445 cc (210.2 cu in)	341 kW (457 hp) at 5,200 rpm	790 N⋅m (583 lbf⋅ft) at 2,000-3,600 rpm		2024-present

== Sales ==
Sales data, from manufacturer yearly data.

Generation	Model(s)	Calendar year	U.S. sales (hybrid)	China sales
UZJ100	LX 470	2000	14,732	
UZJ100	LX 470	2001	9,320	
UZJ100	LX 470	2002	9,231	
UZJ100	LX 470	2003	9,193	
UZJ100	LX 470	2004	9,846	
UZJ100	LX 470	2005	8,555	
UZJ100	LX 470	2006	5,595	
UZJ100	LX 470	2007	2,468	
URJ200	LX 570	2008	7,915	
URJ200	LX 570	2009	3,616	
URJ200	LX 570	2010	3,983	
URJ200	LX 570	2011	3,167	
URJ200	LX 570	2012	5,005	
URJ200	LX 570	2013	4,625	
URJ200	LX 570	2014	4,052	
URJ200	LX 570	2015	3,884	
URJ200	LX 570	2016	5,707	
URJ200	LX 570	2017	6,004	
URJ200	LX 570	2018	4,753	
URJ200	LX 570	2019	4,718	
URJ200	LX 570	2020	4,512	
URJ200	LX 570	2021	3,563	
J310	LX 600 (LX 700h)	2022	3,642 (0)	
J310	LX 600 (LX 700h)	2023	6,959 (0)	3,414
J310	LX 600 (LX 700h)	2024	6,830 (0)	2,674
J310	LX 600 (LX 700h)	2025	7,464 (2,883)	4,092
