= Mark Levinson ML-3 =

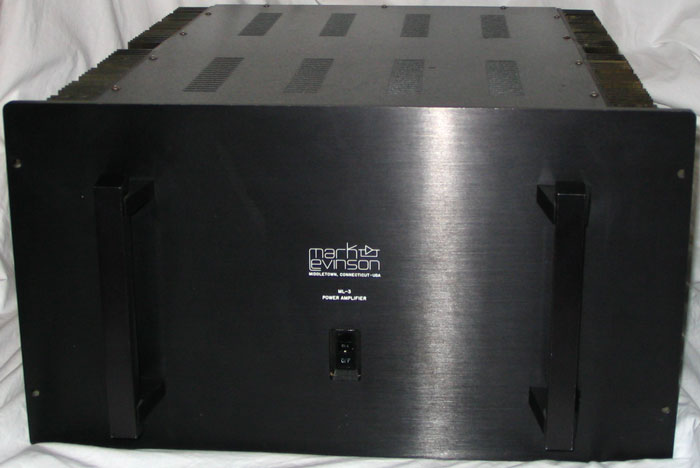
Mark Levinson ML-3 amplifier

The Mark Levinson ML-3 is a 200 watt per channel dual monaural Class AB2 power amplifier that uses two Avel Lindberg toroidal transformers in its powersupply and four huge Sprague Series 36DX, 36.000uF, 100 Volt capacitors. Produced between 1979 and 1987, the ML-3 consisted of two electrically separate amplifiers in one chassis, hence the name "Dual Monaural". It also features discrete circuit construction; no integrated circuits were incorporated to keep the signal pure. The design was by the late Thomas P. Colangelo.

The ML-3 constituted the archetype of an American highend, highpower amplifier. MLAS differentiated three types or versions of the ML-3. The first version had smaller Callins 18.000uF main filtercaps and no decoupling for the driver stage. The second version added 1.700uF decoupling caps for the driver stage and WW Fischer Camac system in- and output connectors. The latest version got an anti buzz circuit, double AC fuseholders and two dampingswitches (for each channel) at the back for optimizing output impedance of the amplifier towards the used loudspeaker. These could be later retrofitted on earlier versions.

== Specifications ==
- 200 W/channel at 8 ohms, 400 W/ch at 4 ohms, 800 W/ch at 2 ohms
- Maximum output: 45 volts 30 amperes
- Two 1.2 kVA Avel Lindbergh toroidal transformers, 4 Sprague 36,000 μF, 100 V capacitors and 40 output devices (20 per channel)
- Range: 20 Hz to 20 kHz with less than 0.2% total harmonic distortion
- Gold-plated CAMAC input connectors
- Adjustable AC voltage: No, factory set.
- Adjustable output damping toggle switches (one per channel) (in later models only)
- Weight: 116 lb (53 kg)
