= Mark Levinson No. 26 =

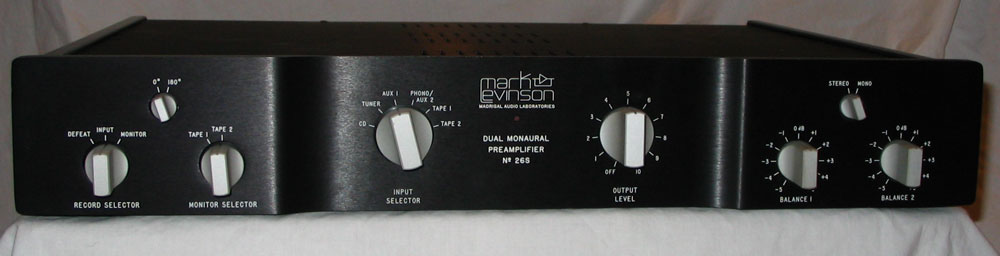
Mark Levinson No. 26S preamplifier

The Mark Levinson No. 26S Dual Monaural Preamplifiers used Teflon circuit boards to supposedly differentiate the No. 26 and the 26S models, produced between 1991 and 1994 by Madrigal Audio Laboratories. This unit utilizes Camac coaxial connectors (except for the XLR balanced ones), which were used in the medical industry as well, because they break hot before they break ground when unplugged. No shorting electronics means a safe preamp and safe ER patients. An external power block, the PLS-226, was used to keep interference to a minimum.

The No. 26 came in three versions, a balanced audio version, a phono version, and a basic version that could do neither. There was only space for one expansion board inside the unit, so it was not possible to put in the phono and the balanced board. This made the phono and balanced inputs on the unit shared; only one set could be active in the unit based on which board was present. The 26S included both phono and one balanced input as standard.

== Specifications ==
- XLR Balanced Stereo Input and Output
- 3 Outputs: Main/Tape 1/Tape 2
- 6 Inputs: Tuner/Tape 1/Tape 2/CD/Aux 1/Phono or Aux 2
- 8 Selector knobs: Input/Output Level/Record/Monitor/Phase/Balanced 1/Balanced 2/Stereo, Mono
- Voltage can be adjusted internally: 100, 120, 200, 220, 240 VAC @ 50–60 Hz
