= Mark Levinson (designer) =

American jazz musician and audio equipment designer

- Born: December 11, 1946 (age 79)
- Occupations: Founder of Mark Levinson Audio Systems (MLAS); Cello Ltd. Red Rose Music; Daniel Hertz S.A.
- Years active: 1972–present
- Spouse: Kim Cattrall (m. 1998; div. 2004)

Mark Levinson (born December 11, 1946) is an American audio equipment designer, recording and mastering engineer, and multi-instrumentalist musician. He was formerly married to the actress Kim Cattrall.

== Career ==
Mark Levinson worked as the bassist for jazz pianist Paul Bley (in 1966 through 1971 by his own account), and mentions other renowned jazz musicians with whom he played then. Bley's memoir has a 1965 photo of his trio with Levinson and Barry Altschul, and tells of touring and recording in Europe with them in 1966. Bley describes Levinson and Altschul as "a rhythm section with a wide range of talents".

In 1972, Levinson founded Mark Levinson Audio Systems (MLAS, Ltd.) in New Haven, Connecticut. He ran MLAS from 1972 to 1980, during which time he created products such as the LNP-2 preamplifier.

However, by 1980 MLAS was in financial trouble. Levinson then asked Sanford Berlin, a retired executive in the audio industry, to invest in MLAS and to aid in the management of the company. Berlin personally invested $480,000 in the company and persuaded several others to invest an additional $300,000.

In the summer of 1984 Levinson left MLAS and founded another company to produce audio equipment, Cello Ltd. Levinson became president and one of the three directors of Cello. MLAS launched a lawsuit attempting to prevent Levinson from working in the audio industry for the rest of his life, on the grounds that he was a "walking trade name" who could "diminish the value of their asset".

Levinson won the case in 1986 but lost the right to use his name as a trade name on an audio product. For this reason, since several years before the lawsuit, "Mark Levinson" branded audio products have had no relationship to the brand's founder; the "Mark Levinson" brand name has been and continues to be an intellectual property wholly owned by Harman International. In resolving the case, the Second Circuit Court of Appeals wrote a 25-page decision that outlined the rights of entrepreneurs who use their own name as the name of a company. Levinson himself has continued to work in the industry, creating several new companies.

Levinson ran his second company, Cello Ltd., from 1984 to 1998. With Cello, Levinson created high-priced models such as the Audio Palette. In 1999, Levinson founded Red Rose Music, an audio company with its own New York retail store on Madison Avenue. The business model of Red Rose was to create compact, affordable products with very high-quality sound.

In 2007, Levinson moved to Switzerland and used his consulting revenue to finance the founding of Daniel Hertz S.A., an audio equipment and audio software company.

== Personal life ==
Mark Levinson and the actress Kim Cattrall were married from 1998 to 2004. The couple co-wrote the book Satisfaction: The Art of the Female Orgasm (2002).

== Discography ==
Nearly all of Levinson's recorded work as a jazz bassist was in jazz piano trios led by Paul Bley, with Barry Altschul on drums.

- Paul Bley – Ramblin', Red Records, Rome 1966
- Paul Bley – Blood, Fontana, Baarn, Netherlands 1966
- Paul Bley – International Jazz Festival, Praha '66, Supraphon, Prague, 1966. One track, "Ramblin'".
- Paul Bley – Paul Bley In Haarlem - Blood, Freedom, Haarlem 1966
- Paul Bley – Ballads, ECM, New York City 1967
- Doug Levinson – Jazz At Long Wharf, Acoustic Recording Series, France 1978
