= Mark Levinson Audio Systems =

American high-end audio equipment brand

Mark Levinson Audio Systems Ltd.

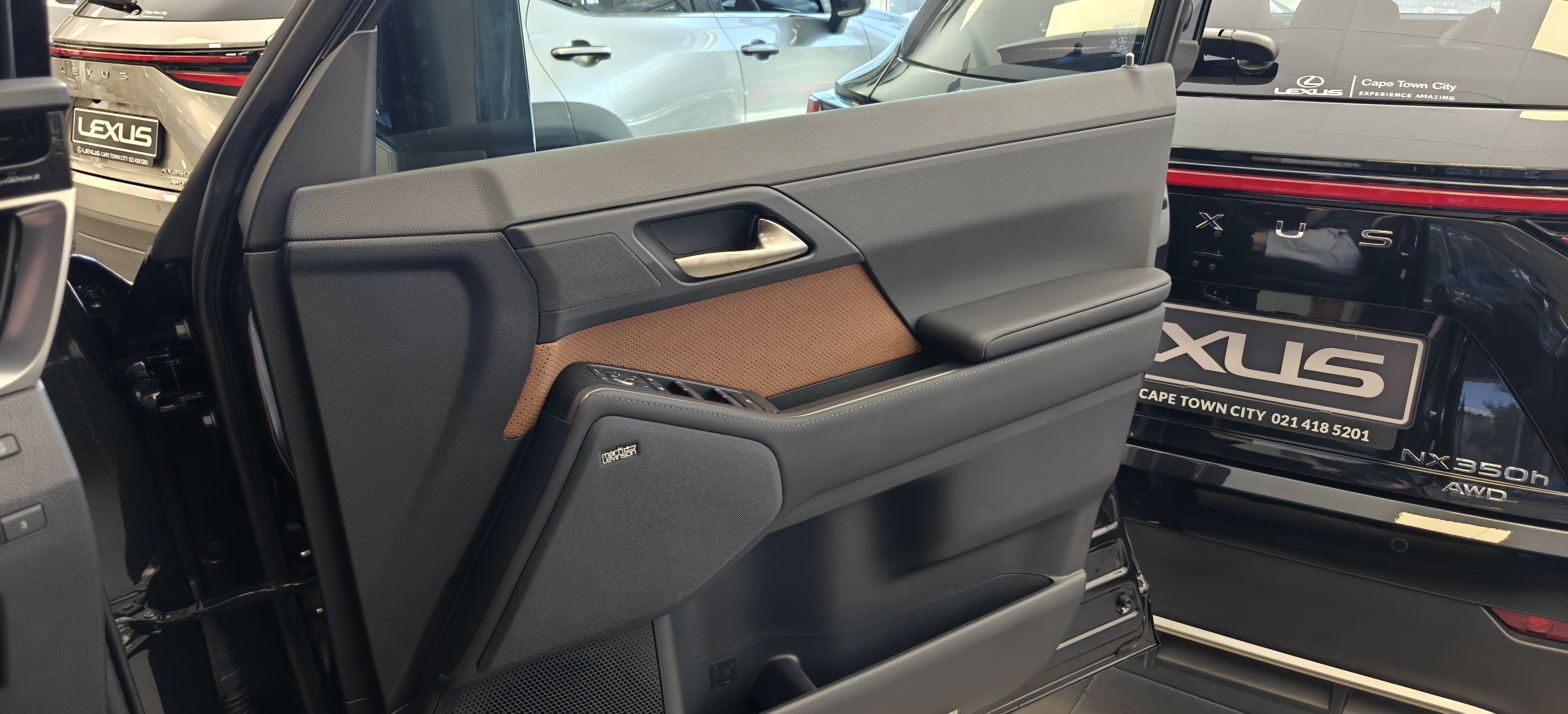
- A Mark Levinson speaker on the driver's side door of a new, 2026 model year Lexus GX550 SE, in Cape Town. Locally, the vehicle features a 21-speaker Mark Levinson Audio System as standard on its SE trim
- Type: Subsidiary
- Industry: High-end audio
- Founded: 1972; 54 years ago
- Founder: Mark Levinson
- Headquarters: Stamford, Connecticut
- Products: Audio equipment
- Owner: Samsung Electronics
- Parent: Harman International Industries
- Website: marklevinson.com

Mark Levinson is an American high-end audio equipment brand established in 1972 by eponymous founder Mark Levinson, and based in Stamford, Connecticut. It is owned by Harman International Industries, a subsidiary of Samsung Electronics.

== History ==
Mark Levinson Audio Systems Ltd. (MLAS) was founded in 1972 in Woodbridge, Connecticut (a suburb of New Haven) by Mark Levinson. Original MLAS products were designed by John Curl (Hence the JC abbreviation to many of the early products) under the supervision of Mark Levinson, with a team of associates. Audio pioneer Dick Burwen, Levinson’s first electronics mentor, helped Levinson start the company with the iconic LNP-2 Preamplifier.

Chief Engineer Tom Colangelo, who brought visionary audio circuitry to the company, died in a tragic car accident in 2007.

By 1980, MLAS was in serious financial trouble. Levinson then asked Sandy Berlin, a retired executive in the audio industry, to invest in MLAS and to aid in the management of the company, which Berlin did, personally investing $480,000 in the company and persuading several others to invest an additional $300,000.

At Berlin's request, Levinson entered into an Employment Agreement with MLAS from December 1980, under which Levinson agreed to convey to MLAS the permanent and exclusive right, title and interest to the trade name "Mark Levinson". He also agreed that, should he leave MLAS's employ, he would not engage in the audio business "anywhere in the world".

In October 1984, three creditors forced MLAS into bankruptcy and Mark Levinson Audio Systems, Ltd. ceased to exist, with Madrigal Audio Labs acquiring "all of [MLAS'] equipment, inventory, parts, finished and semi-finished goods, office furniture, blueprints and trademark and tradename rights including those arising under agreement between Mark Levinson and MLAS.

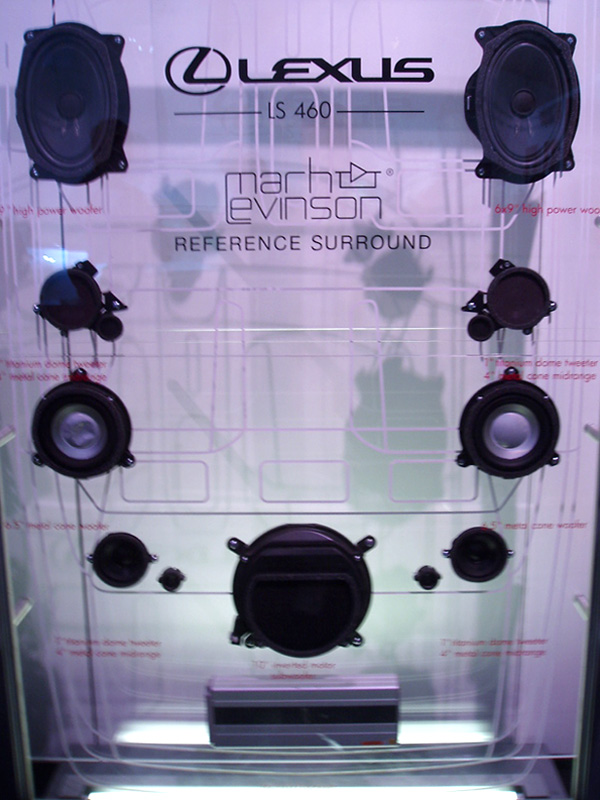
Model of a Mark Levinson Reference Surround system used in the Lexus LS460 (2006)

Since 1990, the Mark Levinson brand and trade name have been property of Harman International Industries. Mark Levinson produces audio amplifiers and digital audio processors that have a characteristic black anodized chassis, a design associated with the brand since the beginning.

Harman also makes Mark Levinson audio systems as an optional upgrade for Lexus luxury automobiles. Harman's Mark Levinson automotive audio systems are designed in collaboration with sound, electrical, and design engineers who produce Mark Levinson audio electronics.

Certain Lexus models have featured Mark Levinson sound systems as an option since 2001, with prices varying based on the vehicle and its specific components (~US$2,500 for the LS 460, ~US$1,600 for the ES 350, ~US$1,440 for the IS 350, etc.).

The first Mark Levinson car 5.1 surround sound system appeared on the Toyota Crown Majesta in 2004. Current US Lexus models available with the Mark Levinson Audio System include: CT200h, IS 250/300h, GS 300h/450h, RC & RC F, NX 300h, RX450h, LS460/600h.

A Mark Levinson speaker on the door of a 2026 Lexus RX 450h+ Luxury trim

== Equipment history ==
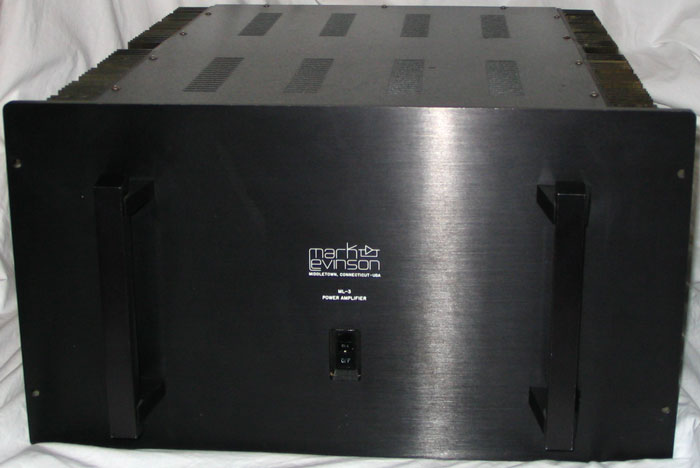
Mark Levinson ML-3 amplifier (1979 through 1987)

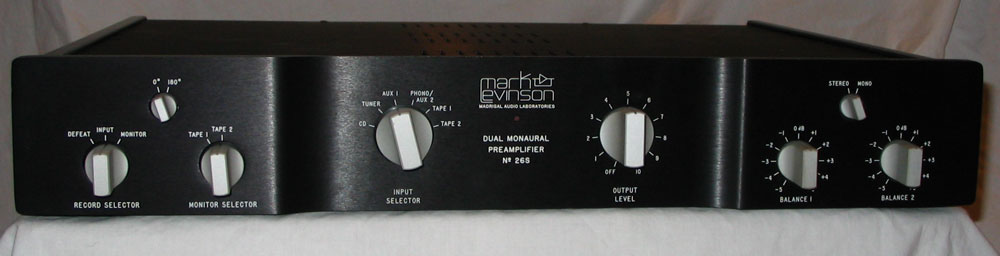
Mark Levinson No. 26S preamplifier

=== Amplifiers ===
- ML-2, a Class A Mono Amplifier with 25 Watts output power at 8 Ohms, regulated power supply for output section and modular construction.
- ML-3, a Class AB Power Amplifier with 2 x 200 Watts output power at 8 Ohms in a dual mono construction.
- ML-9, a Class AB Power Amplifier with 2 x 100 Watts output power at 8 Ohms.
- ML-11, a Class AB Power Amplifier with 2 x 50 Watts output power at 8 Ohms.

=== Preamplifiers ===
- LNP-1 Preamplifier, prototype
- LNP-2 Professional Preamplifier
- JC-1 Moving Coil Cartridge Preamplifier
- JC-1AC Moving Coil Cartridge Preamplifier with battery
- JC-2 Straightline Preamplifier
- ML-1 Preamplifier
- ML-6, ML-6A, ML-6B Preamplifier
- ML-7, ML-7A Preamplifier
- ML-8 Microphone Preamplifier
- ML-10, ML-10A Preamplifier
- ML-12, ML-12A Preamplifier

=== Design credits ===
- LNP-1 and 2, Dick Burwen and Mark Levinson
- JC-1 and JC-2, John Curl
- ML-1 and ML-2, John Curl and Thomas Colangelo
- ML-3 through ML-12A, Thomas Colangelo

=== Power Supplies ===
- PLS-150, for LNP-2 JC-2, ML-1 and LNC-2
- PLS-151, for LNP-2, ML-1, ML-6 and LNC-2
- PLS-153L (Japanese version of PLS 151)
- PLS-154, for, ML-6A and 6B, ML-7 and 7A
- PLS-124, for ML-12A (the ML-12 preamplifier was powered by two umbilical cables from the ML-11 power amplifier.)

=== Crossovers ===
- LNC-2 Electronic Crossover

=== Tape Machines ===
- ML-5 modified Studer A-80 professional tape recorder with custom electronics

=== System ===
- Mark Levinson HQD System

The HQD was Levinson’s tri-amped active replay system. Each of the two channels comprises a woofer using a 24-inch Hartley drive unit, a pair of stacked Quad electrostatic speakers for the midrange and between the two Quad speakers a Decca (Kelly) ribbon tweeter for the treble, the latter modified by having the horn removed. Each speaker was driven by a separate ML-2 amplifier fed by a LNC-2, this in turn being fed by an ML-1 preamp.
