= Mike Garson discography =

This article contains a comprehensive collection of information related to recordings by American pianist Mike Garson.

== Solo albums ==
- 1979: Avant Garson
- 1982: Jazzical
- 1986: Serendipity
- 1989: Remember Love
- 1990: The Mystery Man
- 1990: Oxnard Sessions, Vol.1
- 1992: A Gershwin Fantasia
- 1992: Oxnard Sessions, Vol.2
- 1998: Now! Music (Volume IV)
- 2003: Homage to My Heroes
- 2008: Conversations with My Family
- 2008: Lost in Conversation
- 2008: Mike Garson's Jazz Hat
- 2011: The Bowie Variations
- 2012: Wild Out West
- 2016: Monk Fell On Me
- 2020: Unleashed Volumes 1-6

== Solo EPs ==
- 2006: Contemplation
- 2006: Part of the Whole
- 2007: Anxcity
- 2007: Hope in Forgotten Places

== Free Flight albums ==
- 1984: Beyond the Clouds
- 1986: Illumination
- 1988: Slice of Life
- 1999: Free Flight 2000
- 2002: A Free Flight Christmas
- 2012: Free Flight Forevor

== With David Bowie ==
- 1973: Aladdin Sane
- 1973: Pin Ups
- 1974: David Live
- 1974: Diamond Dogs
- 1975: Young Americans
- 1983: Ziggy Stardust - The Motion Picture
- 1993: Black Tie White Noise
- 1993: The Buddha of Suburbia
- 1995: Santa Monica '72
- 1995: Outside
- 1997: Earthling [US]
- 2000: Bowie at the Beeb
- 2003: Reality
- 2004: Hours (2004 bonus track)
- 2009: VH1 Storytellers (David Bowie album)
- 2010: A Reality Tour (album)
- 2014: Nothing Has Changed - The Very Best of Bowie
- 2015: David Bowie - Five Years (1969-1973)
- 2016: David Bowie - Who Can I Be Now? (1974-1976)
- 2018: Glastonbury 2000
- 2020: I'm Only Dancing: Soul Tour '74

== With Mick Ronson ==
- 1974: Slaughter on 10th Avenue
- 1975: Play Don't Worry

== With Stan Getz ==
- 1980: Stan Getz Live
- 1994: Stan Getz & Colleagues
- 1999: Stan Getz Is Jazz – Live by the Sea

== With Stanley Clarke ==
- 1977: I Wanna Play for You
- 1978: Modern Man

== With Jim Walker ==
- 1983: Flight of the Dove
- 1983: Reflections
- 1997: Walker & Garson Play Gershwin
- 2000: Tranquility
- 2007: Jim Walker Plays the Music of Mike Garson
- 2010: Pied Piper
- 2012: The Music of George Gershwin

== With Billy Corgan ==
- 1999: Stigmata

== With Smashing Pumpkins ==
- 2000: MACHINA/The Machines of God
- 2000: Machina II/The Friends & Enemies of Modern Music (2000)
- 2023: ATUM: A Rock Opera in Three Acts

== With Nine Inch Nails ==
- 1999: The Fragile

== With Mr Averell ==
- 2013: Gridlock

== Participations ==
- 1970: Brethren - Brethren
- 1971: Brethren - Moment of Truth
- 1971: Annette Peacock - Bley / Peacock Synthesizer Show
- 1972: Annette Peacock - I'm the One
- 1973: Lulu (aka: The Man Who Sold the World)
- 1973: Open Sky - Open Sky
- 1975: Bob Sargeant - First Starring Role
- 1975: David Essex - All The Fun of the Fair
- 1977: Paul Horn - Riviera Concert
- 1988: Guy Pastor - It's Magic
- 1991: Mike Garson and Los Gatos - Admiration
- 1991: Brian Bromberg - It's About Time - The Acoustic Project
- 1993: Jazz at the Movies Band - Man & A Woman, Sax at the Movies
- 1994: Jazz at the Movies Band - Reel Romance
- 1994: Robin Williamson - Love & Parting & Five Bardic Mysteries
- 1995: People from Bad Homes - Ava Cherry & Astronettes: People from Bad Homes
- 1997: Jazz at the Movies Band - Sax on Broadway
- 1998: Yamaha - Flute - Contemporary Virtuosos
- 1998: Seal - Human Being
- 1999: C. Gibbs - Twenty Nine over Me
- 2000: No Doubt - Return of Saturn
- 2003: Raphaël Haroche - La Réalité
- 2005: Raphaël Haroche - Caravane
- 2005: Jimmy Chamberlin Complex - Life Begins Again (bonus tracks)
- 2006: Something for Kate - Desert Lights
- 2007: Annie Clark/St Vincent - Marry Me
- 2007: Polyphonic Spree - The Fragile Army
- 2007: Raphaël Haroche - Live - Une Nuit Au Châtelet
- 2007: Emma Burgess - Swim
- 2008: Juno Reactor - Gods and Monsters
- 2008: Aviv Geffen - Live 08
- 2008: Sibyl Vane - The Locked Suitcase
- 2009: Sleepyard - Future Lines
- 2010: Melissa Auf der Maur - Out of Our Minds
- 2010: Dillinger Escape Plan - Option Paralysis
- 2014 Sleepyard - Black Sails
- 2014 Gone Girl (Soundtrack from the Motion Picture)
- 2022 The Pretty Reckless – Other Worlds
