= Slaughter on 10th Avenue =

Slaughter on Tenth Avenue may refer to:

- Slaughter on Tenth Avenue, Balanchine's 1936 ballet music by Richard Rodgers
- Slaughter on Tenth Avenue (film), 1957 crime film
- Slaughter on 10th Avenue (Mick Ronson album), 1974 album
