= Just Like This =

Compilation album by Mick Ronson
- Released: 15 March 1999
- Recorded: November and December 1976
- Venues: Bearsville Sound Studios, Bearsville NY and the Barn, Woodstock, NY
- Genre: Rock
- Length: 63:44
- Labels: Burning Airlines (1999); Easy Action (2018)
- Producer: Mick Ronson

Mick Ronson chronology
Heaven and Hull (1994)	Just Like This (1999)	Showtime (1999)

Just Like This is the fourth solo studio album by Mick Ronson, consisting of previously unreleased material recorded in November and December 1976. It was supposed to become Ronson's third solo album after Slaughter on 10th Avenue (1974) and Play Don't Worry (1975), but due to low selling amounts of the latter album, RCA Records refused to release this as his third album as a solo artist in 1977.

Just Like This was finally released six years after Ronson's death (1993), on 15 March 1999, by New Millennium Music (Burning Airlines label) in a limited amount. A rare extra limited amount has an extra bonus CD with seven demos and two outtakes. The release was backed by Mick Ronson's widow Suzanne Ronson.

Two songs from the album, "I'd Give Anything to See You" and "Hard Life" were included in the 2017 feature-length biographical documentary, and compilation Soundtrack, entitled Beside Bowie: the Mick Ronson Story.

== Track listing ==
All tracks composed by Mick Ronson, except where indicated.

CD One:

1. "Just Like This" (T-Bone Walker)
2. "I'd Give Anything to See You"
3. "Takin' a Train" (Jay Davis)
4. "Hard Life"
5. "(I'm Just a) Junkie for Your Love" (Ricky Fataar)
6. "Crazy Love" (Blondie Chaplin)
7. "Hey Grandma" (Skip Spence)
8. "Is That Any Way"
9. "I've Got No Secrets"
10. "Hard Headed Woman"
11. "Roll Like the River" (Ronson, Mick Barakan, Bobby Chen, Burt Carey)
12. "Angel No. 9" (Craig Fuller)

CD Two:

1. "Crazy Love" (demo)
2. "I'd Give Anything to See You (Right Now)" - (demo)
3. "Takin' The Next Train" (demo)
4. "Hard Life" (Ballad version)
5. "Junkie" (demo)
6. "Hey Grandma" (demo)
7. "Just Like This" (demo)
8. "Ronno's Bar & Grill" (studio outtake)

== Personnel ==
- Mick Ronson – vocals, guitar
- Shane Fontayne – guitar, backing vocals
- Jay Davis – bass, backing vocals
- Burt Carey – bass
- Bobby Chen – drums, backing vocals
- Executive Producer: Suzanne Ronson

== Notes ==
Recorded in November and December 1976 at Bearsville Sound Studio.
