= The Price of Progression =

The Price of Progression may refer to:

- The Price of Progression (The Toll album), 1988
- The Price of Progression (Ensign album), 2001
