= My Mama Never Taught Me How to Cook =

My Mama Never Taught Me How to Cook: The Aura Years 1978–1982

Compilation album by Annette Peacock
- Released: 2004
- Recorded: 1978–1982
- Genre: Jazz, rock
- Length: 1:18:32
- Label: Sanctuary; CMRCD956
- Producer: Annette Peacock

My Mama Never Taught Me How to Cook: The Aura Years 1978–1982 is a compilation album by composer, singer, songwriter, and producer Annette Peacock. It brings together material previously released by the Aura label on X-Dreams (1978), The Perfect Release (1979), and The Collection (1982), and was released by Sanctuary Records in 2004.

== Reception ==
Professional ratings
Review scores
Source	Rating
AllMusic	4.5/5 stars
Pitchfork	7.9/10 stars
The Encyclopedia of Popular Music	4/5 stars
Tom Hull – on the Web	A

In a review for AllMusic, Richie Unterberger wrote: "These recordings' mix of jazz fusion, album-oriented rock, and Peacock's unusual blend of jazzy singing with sensually spoken intellectual poetic passages was too offbeat to get any more than a cult audience, though it's more accessible than many a cult rock artist's work. This is as complete a document of that part of her career as any fan could wish for."

A reviewer for Pitchfork stated: "None of her records... capture Peacock's singing as clearly and thoroughly as this collection... It was easier to sound mysterious in the 70s, when your career, the story behind your career, and the subtext under everything you did weren't put under a microscope. But even by those standards, Peacock's a cipher: She lets the work speak for itself, when it so chooses."

The BBC's Peter Marsh commented: "Hardly a month goes by these days without the rediscovery of some neglected talent... In Annette Peacock's case, the words 'neglected' and 'talent' don't really begin to do her justice, but her rediscovery's been a long time coming... Though she's never achieved... commercial success, there's no doubt that Peacock's talent is still deserving of wider recognition."

Writing for The Herald, Keith Bruce noted that the album is "both outspokenly political and louchely sensual, experimental and downright groovy, and contains one of the great alternative slogans to the Atkins diet in its opening line: 'My mama never taught me how to cook - that's why I'm so skinny'."

== Track listing ==
"Don't Be Cruel" composed by Otis Blackwell and Elvis Presley. Remaining tracks composed by Annette Peacock

1. "My Mama Never Taught Me How to Cook" – 5:30
2. "Real & Defined Androgens" – 10:59
3. "Dear Bela" – 3:02
4. "This Feel Within" – 5:20
5. "Too Much in the Skies" – 4:54
6. "Don't Be Cruel" – 4:35
7. "Questions" – 2:55
8. "Love's Out to Lunch" – 2:22
9. "Solar Systems" – 3:07
10. "American Sport" – 3:43
11. "A Loss of Consciousness" – 3:43
12. "Rubber Hunger" – 4:21
13. "The Succubus" – 3:49
14. "Survival" – 14:48
15. "Mexico" – 2:50
16. "What's It Like in Your Dreams" – 2:30
- Tracks 1–7 originally appeared on X-Dreams (Aura, 1978). Tracks 8–14 originally appeared on The Perfect Release (Aura, 1979). Tracks 15–16 originally appeared on The Collection (Aura, 1982).

== Personnel on tracks 1–7 ==
- Annette Peacock – vocals, keyboards, synthesizer
- Dave Chambers – saxophone
- George Khan – saxophone
- Ray Warleigh – saxophone
- Peter Lemer – keyboards
- Tom Cosgrove – guitar
- Brian Godding – guitar
- Phil Lee – guitar
- Jim Mullen – guitar
- Mick Ronson – guitar
- Chris Spedding – guitar
- Jeff Clyne – bass
- Steve Cook – bass
- Kuma Harada – bass
- Peter Pavli – bass
- Stu Woods – bass
- Bill Bruford – drums
- John Halsey – drums
- Rick Marotta – drums
- Dave Sheen – drums
- Brother James – congas, percussion
- Darryl Lee Que – congas

== Personnel on tracks 8–16 ==
- Annette Peacock – vocals
- Robert Ahwai – guitar
- Max Middleton – keyboards
- John McKenzie – bass
- Richard Bailey – drums
- Darryl Lee Que – percussion
- Lennox Laington – percussion, steel drums
