= Showtime (Mick Ronson album) =

Live album by Mick Ronson
- Released: 1999
- Recorded: 1976 and 1989
- Genre: Rock
- Length: 67:26
- Label: NMC
- Producer: Beccy Ryan

Mick Ronson chronology
Just Like This (1994)	Showtime (1999)	Indian Summer (2001)

Showtime is a live album by the English rock guitarist Mick Ronson, which was released in 1999. It is a compilation of two live shows from 1976 and 1989, and the album was released six years after Ronson's death.

It was given a two and a half star rating by AllMusic, which noted, "The real magic of Mick is a long way from this particular release."

== Track listing ==
1. "Crazy Love" (Blondie Chaplin)
2. "Hey Grandma" (Jerry Miller, Don Stevenson)
3. "Takin' a Train" (Jay Davis)
4. "Junkie" (Ricky Fataar)
5. "I'd Give Anything to See You" (Ronson)
6. "Hard Life" (Ronson)
7. "Just Like This" (T-Bone Walker)
8. "Sweet Dreamer" (Ronson, D. Gibson)
9. "F.B.I." (Peter Gormley)
10. "White Light/White Heat" (Lou Reed)
11. "Darling Let's Have Another Baby" (Fred Berk)
12. "Slaughter on Tenth Avenue" (Richard Rodgers)

1–7 Live in Century Theatre, Buffalo, New York with the Mick Ronson Band 1976
8,10,11 Live in San Jose 16.12.89
9 Live in New York 12.6.79
12 Live in Hamburg

Bonus disc

1. "F.B.I." (Stockholm May 1991)
2. "Take a Long Time" (Stockholm May 1991)
3. "Trouble With You, Trouble With Me" (Stockholm May 1991)
4. "Don't Look Down" (Stockholm October 1991)
5. 30 Minute interview
6. "Angel No. 9" (Ford Auditorium 28.4.79)
- Executive Producer: Suzanne Ronson
