= Remember Love =

Remember Love may refer to:

- "Remember Love" (Yoko Ono song), a song by the Plastic Ono Band, B-side of "Give Peace a Chance", 1969
- Remember Love (Mike Garson album) or the title song, 1989
- Remember Love (Houston Person and Ron Carter album), 2018
- "Remember Love", a song by the Newbeats, 1972
