= Hope in Forgotten Places =

EP by Mike Garson
- Released: 2007
- Genre: Avant Garde, Electronica
- Label: MG&A
- Producer: Mike Garson

Mike Garson chronology
Anxcity (EP) (2007)	Hope in Forgotten Places (2007)	Conversations with My Family (2007)

Professional ratings
Review scores
Source	Rating
Regenmag Review	4.0/5 stars

Hope in Forgotten Places is the fourth solo EP by jazz pianist Mike Garson, released in 2007 via his Myspace site.

== Track listing ==
1. Hope In Forgotten places
2. Less Is More
3. Thank You
4. Chaos in Brooklyn
