= Indian Summer (Mick Ronson album) =

Compilation album by Mick Ronson
- Released: 2001
- Recorded: 1981–1982
- Genre: Rock
- Length: 38:42
- Producers: Patrick Bird, Jon Klein

Mick Ronson chronology
Showtime (1999)	Indian Summer (2001)

Indian Summer is the fifth and final solo studio album by Mick Ronson. Recorded in 1981, it was intended to be a soundtrack album for a film that was never produced. Many of the tracks were instrumentals. The track "Indian Summer" was considered for Ronson's solo album Heaven and Hull.

It was given a two-star rating by AllMusic.

== Track listing ==
1. "Indian Summer (Opening Title)"
2. "Tinker Street"
3. "Satellite 1"
4. "(Interlude) Get on With It"
5. "Ballad of Jack Daniels"
6. "Blue Velvet Skirt"
7. "Midnight Love"
8. "Satellite 1"
9. "Blue Velvet Skirt (Reprise)"
10. "Plane to England"
11. "China"
12. "I'd Give Anything to See You (Closing Title)"
