= Paul Bley & Scorpio =

Studio album by Paul Bley
- Released: 1973
- Recorded: November 24, 1972
- Studio: Advantage Studios, New York City, NY
- Genre: Jazz
- Length: 42:51
- Label: Milestone MSP 9046
- Producer: Orrin Keepnews

Paul Bley chronology
Open, to Love (1972)	Paul Bley & Scorpio (1973)	Paul Bley/NHØP (1973)

Paul Bley & Scorpio is an album by Paul Bley performing compositions by Annette Peacock and Carla Bley which was released by the Milestone label in 1973.

== Reception ==
Professional ratings
Review scores
Source	Rating
AllMusic	0/5 stars

AllMusic reviewer Eugene Chadbourne noted that "This one is the album where he goes head over heels for the electric piano, and fans of jazz with that Fender Rhodes sound are going to want it ... Paul Bley sits at a bank of keyboards here, giving forth a passage on acoustic, then some chirping synthesizer, then some electric piano, and so forth ... Nothing seems to be happening on quite a bit of this record, since Bley is deep into his playing slow quest. A pity the electric piano conveys so much less of his personal musical feel, not that the instrument is incapable of it, just that Bley doesn't deliver. He also seems distracted by the banks of available keyboards".

== Track listing ==
All compositions by Annette Peacock except where noted

1. "El Cordobes" – 4:33
2. "Capricorn" (Paul Bley) – 5:31
3. "King Korn" (Carla Bley) – 4:55
4. "Dreams" – 6:17
5. "Syndrome" (Carla Bley) – 7:55
6. "Gesture Without Plot" – 9:45
7. "Ictus" (Carla Bley) – 4:05

== Personnel ==
- Paul Bley – Baldwin piano, ARP synthesizer, RMI electric piano, Fender Rhodes electric piano
- David Holland – acoustic bass, fuzz pedal
- Barry Altschul – percussion
