= C'mon, Accept Your Joy! =

C'mon, Accept Your Joy

Studio album by Chris McKay & the Critical Darlings
- Released: May 7, 2007
- Recorded: 2005
- Genre: Rock
- Length: 43:40
- Label: SideBMusic
- Producer: Chris McKay and Tom Bavis

Professional ratings
Review scores
Source	Rating
Flagpole Magazine	(not rated)

C'mon, Accept Your Joy! is the debut album of Athens, Georgia-based power pop band Chris McKay & the Critical Darlings. According to Flagpole Magazine, "There’s a vague but strong taste of Cheap Trick’s “Surrender” in its muscular smiling power-pop, and that’s always a selling point." The University of Georgia paper Red and Black declared the disc as sounding like "the Clash or some other music from that time."

== Track listing ==
1. "Towel Cape Song" – 3:31
2. "I Know Too Much (For My Own Good)" – 4:22
3. "Into My View" – 3:57
4. "Sometimes I'm Sam" – 4:10
5. "Phony" – 5:32
6. "Down" – 5:22
7. "Colors in Black & White" – 3:28
8. "Until The Road Ends" – 2:25
9. "Taking Its Toll" – 5:49
10. "I'll Be Fine" – 4:50

== Personnel ==
- Chris McKay - lead vocals, guitars, bass, Rhodes, synths
- Frank DeFreese - bass, rhythm guitar
- Tom Bavis - drums, percussion, vocals, white noise, synths

== Album notes ==
- Produced, arranged and sequenced by Chris McKay and Tom Bavis
- Mastered at City Mastering by Jeff Capurso
- Recorded at D.A.R.C in Athens, Georgia
- All songs Copyright 2005 Blather Skite Music, ASCAP
- Cover painting by Scott Bullock Penumbra Studios
- Live photo by Amanda Stahl
- Back cover band portrait by Asa Leffer
- Graphic design and layout defaulted to Chris McKay
