= Serendipity (Mike Garson album) =

Studio album by Mike Garson
- Released: 1986
- Recorded: April 9, 1986, Civic Auditorium, Oxnard, California & April 27, 1986, Santa Ana HS Auditorium
- Genre: Classical Jazz
- Length: 54:26
- Label: Reference Recordings
- Producer: Mike Garson, J. Tamblyn Henderson, Jr.

Mike Garson chronology
Jazzical (1982)	Serendipity (1986)	Remember Love (1989)

Professional ratings
Review scores
Source	Rating
Allmusic	link

Serendipity is the third solo album by jazz pianist Mike Garson, and was released in 1986.

== Track listing ==
All tracks composed by Michael Garson; except where indicated

1. "Serendipity"
2. "Lady" (Lionel Richie)
3. "Autumn Leaves" (Johnny Mercer, Joseph Kosma)
4. "I Should Care" (Axel Stordahl, Paul Weston, S. Kahn)
5. "Spirit of Play"
6. "Trio Blues"
7. "My Romance" (Lorenz Hart, Richard Rodgers)
8. "The Promise"
9. "Tam's Jam" (Billy Mintz, Gary Herbig, Jim Lacefield, Michael Garson, Peter Sprague)
10. "Searching"
11. "My One and Only Love" (Guy Wood, Robert Mellin)

== Personnel ==
- Mike Garson - piano
- Peter Sprague – guitar
- Jim Laceford, Stanley Clarke – bass
- Gary Herbig – tenor and alto saxophone
- Jim Walker – flute
- Billy Mintz – drums
