= I'm the One (Annette Peacock album) =

Studio album by Annette Peacock
- Released: January 1972
- Studio: RCA (New York City)
- Genres: Avant-garde jazz; avant-funk; electronic
- Length: 36:24
- Label: RCA
- Producers: Annette Peacock, Bob Ringe

Annette Peacock chronology
Dual Unity (1972)	I'm the One (1972)	X-Dreams (1978)

I'm the One is the debut solo album by Annette Peacock and was released by RCA in 1972. In 2010 Peacock remastered and reissued it on her label, ironic US, in a signed, collector's edition. In 2012, the album was reissued again by the Future Days imprint of Light in the Attic Records.

I'm the One fuses blues, jazz, avant-garde electronic music (including extensive treatment of her own voice through a Moog synthesizer) and free form poetry and rap. It was recorded live and mostly in single takes.

The coda of the David Bowie song "Something in the Air", from the album Hours, paid homage to "I'm the One", a song of which Bowie was fond. Pianist Mike Garson, who played keyboards on "I'm the One", and who also provided the piano solo on Bowie's song "Aladdin Sane", recalled: "no one would know he stole that from Annette, because you don't even know who Annette is. She was another... big influence." (Peacock had turned down Bowie's request that she appear on the album Aladdin Sane.) Bowie sideman Mick Ronson incorporated "I'm the One" and Peacock's arrangement of "Love Me Tender" into his 1974 album Slaughter on 10th Avenue.

== Reception ==
Professional ratings
Review scores
Source	Rating
AllMusic	4/5 stars
All About Jazz	5/5 stars
DownBeat	4.5/5 stars
The Guardian	4/5 stars
PopMatters	10/10 stars

In an article for The Guardian, John Fordham called the album a "seismically influential session," and wrote: "for all the familiarity of computer-assisted vocals now, nothing prepares you for the howl of her searingly high notes spiralling up out of spooky organ chords and soul-brass riffs on the title track, or against the rolling blues groove of 'Pony', or the dark and prowling one of 'Blood'. Elvis's 'Love Me Tender' is the only cover, a blend of soft, lyrical intimacy and fierce exhortation. The underpinnings are as 1970s soul/blues-rooted as any classic-pop listener could wish, but the uncompromising, sound-manipulating focus still sounds contemporary.

A reviewer for PopMatters commented: "I'm the One spotlights [Peacock's] abilities as a vocalist, composer, and innovator in a fashion that is seamless and still... breathtaking... who Peacock influenced and what they borrowed or stole doesn't matter when you're presented with the brilliance of this 37-minute opus, a record that wasn't as much ahead of its time as it was carving out its time, laying the groundwork for what was possible in a still-young decade and a year that still holds power over the heart and imagination of contemporary music."

A reviewer for The Times remarked: "I'm the One... still sounds like the future 40 years on. In an age when it is standard for stars' voices to be digitally manipulated, these early excursions into electronics remain more bizarre than anything today."

In a review for Perfect Sound Forever, Richard Mason wrote: "this is a remarkable recording, featuring song formats ranging from free jazz to soulful funk, but all with the unmistakeable Annette Peacock touch, music that invites you in, implores you to get involved, to think, to feel physically and cerebrally, to hear and listen actively."

Stephen Judge, writing for Blurt, stated: "Forty years on, I'm the One shouldn't sound so unusual – the collision of singer/songwriter pop and electronic tomfoolery has become fairly common in the current millennium. But Peacock's avant jazz background and the spirit of doing something new suffuses I'm the One with enough joie de vivre to keep it sounding fresh even now."

Martin Aston called the album "revelatory", and commented: "I'm The One remains a visionary slab of darkly intimate avant-funk electronic torch blues... Out there and yet equally soulful, I'm The One had no peers, save perhaps Tim Buckley if you combined his jazz odyssey Starsailor and his subsequent sex-funk riposte Greetings From LA."

== Track listing ==
All tracks composed and arranged by Annette Peacock; except where indicated.

=== Side A ===
1. "I'm the One" – 6:45
2. "7 Days" – 3:54
3. "Pony" – 6:15
4. "Been & Gone" – 2:20

=== Side B ===
1. "Blood" – 2:00
2. "One Way" – 6:12
3. "Love Me Tender" (Elvis Presley, Vera Matson) – 3:45
4. "Gesture Without Plot" – 3:29
5. "Did You Hear Me Mommy?" – 1:44

== Personnel ==
- Annette Peacock – vocals, electronic vocals, acoustic and electric piano, synthesizers, electric vibraphone, liner notes, direction
- Paul Bley – synthesizer and piano on "Blood" and "Gesture Without Plot"
- Mike Garson – piano and organ on "I'm the One", organ on "One Way"
- Mark Whitecage – alto saxophone
- Michael Moss – tenor saxophone
- Perry Robinson – clarinet
- Tom Cosgrove – guitar
- Stu Woods – bass
- Glen Moore – bass on "Blood"
- Rick Marotta – drums
- Laurence Cook – drums
- Barry Altschul – percussion
- Airto Moreira – percussion
- Dom Um Romão – percussion
- Orestes Vilató – percussion
- Apache Bley – piano on "Did You Hear Me Mommy?"

Technical

- Guy Mossler – recording engineer
- Richard Davis – artwork, photography (materialised)
