= Dual Unity =

Live album by Annette Peacock & Paul Bley
- Released: 1972
- Recorded: March 26 and November 16, 1971
- Venue: Club B14, Rotterdam, Netherlands
- Genre: Jazz
- Length: 39:38
- Label: Freedom
- Producer: Alan Bates

Paul Bley chronology
Improvisie (1971)	Dual Unity (1972)	Open, to Love (1972)

Annette Peacock chronology
Dual Unity (1972)	I'm the One (1972)

Dual Unity is a live album by Annette Peacock and Paul Bley (credited as Annette & Paul Bley) which was released by Freedom Records in 1972.

== Reception ==
Professional ratings
Review scores
Source	Rating
AllMusic	2/5 stars

Allmusic gave the album two stars, noting, "The madly in love combination of Paul Bley and Annette Peacock, toting all kinds of unstable synthesizer equipment around Europe, and backed by the madcap Han Bennink on drums, adds up to the stuff of musical legend. Sadly enough, this is one of the better musical documents from these encounters".

== Track listing ==
All compositions by Annette Peacock and Paul Bley except as indicated

1. "M.J." (Annette Peacock) - 17:22
2. "Gargantuan Encounter" - 4:36
3. "Richter Scale" - 8:12
4. "Dual Unity" - 3:22
- Recorded at Club B14 in Rotterdam, Netherlands on March 26, 1971 (tracks 1 & 2) and at Espace Cardin in Paris, France, on November 16, 1971 (tracks 3 & 4)

== Personnel ==
- Annette Peacock – bass guitar, electric piano, piano, vocals
- Paul Bley – electric piano, synthesizer
- Mario Pavone – double bass
- Han Bennink – drums (tracks 1 and 2)
- Laurence Cook – drums (tracks 3 and 4)
