= The Paul Bley Synthesizer Show =

Studio album by Paul Bley
- Released: 1971
- Recorded: December 9, 1970, January 21 & March 9, 1971
- Studio: Advantage Studios, New York City, NY
- Genre: Jazz
- Length: 39:38
- Label: Milestone MSP 9033
- Producer: Orrin Keepnews

Paul Bley chronology
| Revenge: The Bigger the Love, the Greater the Hate (1969) | The Paul Bley Synthesizer Show (1971) | Improvisie (1971) |

The Paul Bley Synthesizer Show is an album by Paul Bley performing compositions by Annette Peacock which was released on the Milestone label in 1971.

== Reception ==
Professional ratings
Review scores
| Source | Rating |
|---|---|
| Allmusic | 4/5 stars |
| The Rolling Stone Jazz Record Guide | 3/5 stars |

Allmusic awarded the album 4 stars noting that "Removed several decades from the initial hoopla about electronic instruments, this music can really be appreciated as a stunning document of Bley in action, bringing past and present aspects of his creativity into something new, developing right in front of the musicians that he gets such superb performances out of".

== Track listing ==
All compositions by Annette Peacock

1. "Mr. Joy" - 4:30
2. "The Archangel" - 6:46
3. "Nothing Ever Was, Anyway" - 6:50
4. "Gary" - 4:28
5. "Snakes" - 6:49
6. "Parks" - 6:07
7. "Circles" - 4:08
- Recorded at Advantage Studios in New York City on December 9, 1970 (tracks 2, 6 & 7), January 21, 1971 (tracks 1, 3 & 4) and March 9, 1971 (tracks 3 & 5).

== Personnel ==
- Paul Bley - piano, ARP synthesizer, RMI electric piano
- Glen Moore (tracks 1, 3 & 4), Frank Tusa (tracks 3 & 5), Dick Youngstein (tracks 2, 6 & 7) - bass
- Steve Hass (tracks 1–4, 6 & 7), Bobby Moses (tracks 3 & 5) - drums
