= An Acrobat's Heart =

Studio album by Annette Peacock
- Released: 2000
- Recorded: January and April 2000
- Studio: Rainbow Studio; Oslo, Norway
- Genre: Jazz
- Length: 61:15
- Label: ECM; ECM 1733
- Producer: Manfred Eicher

Annette Peacock chronology
Abstract-contact (1988)	An Acrobat's Heart (2000)	31:31 (2006)

An Acrobat's Heart is an album by American jazz pianist and composer Annette Peacock, recorded in January and April 2000 and released on ECM later that year—her first release after an absence of over ten years. Peacock is backed by the Cikada String Quartet, consisting violinists Henrik Hannisdal and Odd Hannisdal, violist Marek Konstantynowicz and cellist Morten Hannisdal.

== Background ==
Peacock was commissioned by Manfred Eicher to write music for voice, piano, and strings. Peacock reflected: "I told him I'd never written for string quartet, and he said that was fine with him. So I thought 'OK, go for it'. I heard [in my mind] this string quartet which was just pure sound, just bow on string... And I thought... yes!"

== Reception ==
Professional ratings
Review scores
Source	Rating
AllMusic	3/5 stars
Entertainment Weekly	A−

Stacia Proefrock of AllMusic gave the album three stars out of five, stating, "this album proves that after over three decades as a performer, Annette Peacock still has the skill to compose and execute truly beautiful music."

A reviewer for All About Jazz commented: "'An Acrobat's Heart' is cause for celebration, not only for the re-emergence of Peacock and the reminder of her originality, but also for the consistent and influential statement that she makes, sparingly and powerfully."

Entertainment Weekly's Josef Woodard called the music "a hypnotically tender and ethereal song cycle," and wrote: "Hinting at jazz and chamber music, her private musical language is a bittersweet waking dream of a project, and a welcome return."

In an article for The New York Times, Giovanni Russonello remarked: "The songs... feel like Tin Pan Alley ballads cut open, made into dark dreams. Her voice is like thick smoke, somewhere between a mutter and a purr."

Tom Terrell of JazzTimes wrote: "Less is more than enough for Peacock's exquisitely strange and haunting songs about love..., loneliness..., obsession..., fear and fearlessness... Peacock's smoky alto rarely rises above a whisper, and she phrases silence like Miles."

A writer for JAZZed magazine stated: "the album is typically spare and strikingly lyrical, yet no more conventionally jazz-like in intent as any of her earlier work. Still, it wouldn't be much of a surprise to find discerning jazz musicians rediscovering these tunes somewhere down the line. Quality, even from the least ordinary of artists, has a strange way of resurfacing."

== Track listing ==
All compositions and string arrangements by Annette Peacock

1. "Mia's Proof" – 5:24
2. "Tho" – 5:24
3. "Weightless" – 4:42
4. "Over" – 3:52
5. "As Long as Now" – 3:49
6. "U Slide" – 4:17
7. "B 4 U Said" – 4:42
8. "The Heart Keeps" – 3:08
9. "Ways It Isn't" – 3:50
10. "Unspoken" – 2:59
11. "Safe" – 3:29
12. "Free the Memory" – 4:36
13. "Ever 2 B Gotten" – 2:53
14. "Camille" – 4:50
15. "Lost at Last" – 2:18

== Personnel ==
=== Musicians ===
- Annette Peacock – vocal, piano
- The Cikada String Quartet
  - Henrik Hannisdal, Odd Hannisdal – violin
  - Marek Konstantynowicz – viola
  - Morten Hannisdal – violoncello

=== Technical personnel ===
- Manfred Eicher – producer
- Jan Erik Kongshaug – engineer
- Sascha Kleis – design
- Alastair Thain – photography
- Charlotte Baker Wilbraham – back cover photo
