= Open, to Love =

Studio album by Paul Bley
- Released: 1972
- Recorded: September 11, 1972
- Studio: Arne Bendiksen Studio; Oslo, Norway
- Genre: Jazz
- Length: 42:32
- Label: ECM 1023 ST
- Producer: Manfred Eicher

Paul Bley chronology
Dual Unity (1972)	Open, to Love (1972)	Paul Bley & Scorpio (1973)

Open, to Love is a solo album by Canadian jazz pianist and composer Paul Bley recorded on September 11, 1972 and released on ECM later that year.

== Background ==
The album is one of the first showcases of the pointillism and silence that would inform much of his later work.

Open, to Love was selected as part of the ECM Touchstones series, as one of the most influential recordings on the label.

== Reception ==
Professional ratings
Review scores
Source	Rating
AllMusic	5/5 stars
DownBeat	5/5 stars
The Penguin Guide to Jazz	4/4 stars
The Rolling Stone Jazz Record Guide	5/5 stars

The AllMusic review by Thom Jurek awarded the album 5 stars stating "Despite the fact that pianist and composer Paul Bley had been a renowned and innovative jazzman for nearly 20 years, 1973 saw the release of his most mature and visionary work, and one that to this day remains his opus. This is one of the most influential solo piano recordings in jazz history, and certainly one that defined the sound of the German label ECM... Ultimately, what Bley offers is jazz pianism as a new kind of aural poetics, one that treats the extension of the composer's line much as the poet treats the line as the extension of breath. Sheer brilliance." The Penguin Guide to Jazz said "There is, perhaps, inevitably a hint of deja-vu here and there, but the territory is always much too interesting for that to become a problem."

== Track listing ==
Side I
No.	Title	Writer(s)	Length
1.	"Closer"	Carla Bley	5:51
2.	"Ida Lupino"	Carla Bley	7:31
3.	"Started"	Paul Bley	5:13
Total length:			18:36

Side II
No.	Title	Writer(s)	Length
1.	"Open, to Love"	Annette Peacock	7:10
2.	"Harlem"	Paul Bley	3:22
3.	"Seven"	Carla Bley	7:21
4.	"Nothing Ever Was, Anyway"	Annette Peacock	6:02
Total length:			23:56 42:32

== Personnel ==
Paul Bley – piano
