= Chris McKay & the Critical Darlings =

- Chris McKay & the Critical Darlings

Background information
- Origin: Athens, Georgia, United States
- Genres: Power pop, Rock, Pop
- Years active: 2004 — Present
- Labels: Side B Music
- Members: Chris McKay; Frank DeFreese; Joe Orr; Josh Harrison
- Website: www.criticaldarlings.com

Photographer Chris McKay, of Athens, Georgia, winner of several ASCAP Music Awards for his solo work, had wanted to be back in a group since his days with Q-Sign, which was named "one of the best unsigned bands in America" by Musician magazine.

In 2004, McKay and his bass-playing high school friend Frank DeFreese formed The Critical Darlings. When word started to spread, the offers for shows came. "For the first year, we never booked gigs. We only accepted invitations," McKay said. "I thought that was a great sign."

Eventually, the Darlings went into the studio to record C’mon, Accept Your Joy! Before the CD was finished, leaked tracks had garnered airplay in 3 states. A month prior to the album's release, the band found themselves used as a punchline on Comedy Central's The Daily Show with Jon Stewart. Since the official release of Joy, the songs have been picked up by over 150 stations around the world (including Poland, New Zealand, England and the United States).

In 2007, the Critical Darlings expanded to a quartet (with the addition of guitarist / vocalist Joe Orr and drummer Josh Harrison) and have started work on their second album, titled Satisfactionista with Grammy Award-nominated producer David Barbe (R.E.M., Drive-By Truckers, Bettye LaVette) behind the board. Of interest is the collaboration with David Bowie's pianist Mike Garson (Aladdin Sane, Diamond Dogs, Young Americans) who appears on the track Something Unseen (which also finds Drive-By Truckers’ Brad Morgan on drums). The Darlings are one of the first to employ Pete Townshend's Lifehouse Method in "co-composing" several tracks with The Who's songwriter / guitarist via software that produces a unique song based on data input.

Lee Valentine Smith of Creative Loafing has named the Critical Darlings "a great little buzz-worthy band" and dubbed McKay "power pop potentate."

== Discography ==
- C'mon, Accept Your Joy! (May 7, 2007)
- An Uncertain Flight (EP, 2007)
- Satisfactionista (Summer, 2008)
