= The Mystery Man =

Studio album by Mike Garson
- Released: 1990
- Recorded: 1990
- Genre: Classical Jazz
- Length: 54:00
- Label: City Hall
- Producer: Mike Garson

Mike Garson chronology
Remember Love (1989)	The Mystery Man (1990)	Oxnard Sessions, Vol.1 (1990)

Professional ratings
Review scores
Source	Rating
Allmusic	link

The Mystery Man is the fifth solo album by jazz pianist Mike Garson, and was released in 1990.

== Track listing ==
All tracks are written by Mike Garson, except where noted.

No.	Title	Writer(s)	Length
1.	"Illumination"		3:39
2.	"Plain and Simple"		7:44
3.	"The Mystery Man"		4:31
4.	"Sunset"		4:35
5.	"Be"		3:14
6.	"Brooklyn Blues"		4:36
7.	"Let It Be"	John Lennon, Paul McCartney	3:28
8.	"Do It Out of Love Pt.1"		3:03
9.	"My Home"		3:56
10.	"The Medicine Man"		3:18
11.	"Without a Song"	Vincent Youmans	9:59
12.	"Do It Out of Love Pt. 2"		1:58
