= Free Flight (band) =

- Genre: Jazz
- Years active: 1980–present
- Labels: Palo Alto; Columbia
- Members: Jim Walker; Mike Garson
- Past members: Peter Erskine; Ralph Humphrey; Jimmy Lacefield; Milcho Leviev; Brian Pezzone

Free Flight is an American jazz ensemble led by flutist Jim Walker.

== History ==
Members have included Peter Erskine, Milcho Leviev, Ralph Humphrey, Brian Pezzone and Jimmy Lacefield. The ensemble has consisted of piano, flute, bass, and drums.

Currently, Jim Walker and Mike Garson are the only permanent members of the group that was formed in 1980. The bassist and drummer positions are now filled by college students or recent graduates that tour and perform as Free Flight.

== Discography ==
- The Jazz/Classical Union (1982)
- Soaring (Palo Alto, 1983)
- Beyond the Clouds (Palo Alto, 1984)
- Illumination (Columbia, 1986)
- Slice of Life (Columbia, 1989)
