= Jim Walker (flautist) =

American flutist and educator

- Born: James Walker; Greenville, Kentucky
- Genres: Classical, jazz
- Occupations: Educator, soloist
- Instrument: Flute
- Formerly of: Pittsburgh Symphony; Los Angeles Philharmonic; New York Philharmonic; Free Flight
- Military service
- Allegiance: United States
- Branch: United States Army
- Service years: 1965–1968
- Unit: USMA Band

James Walker is an American flutist and educator. He is the former principal flute of the Los Angeles Philharmonic, and the founder of the jazz quartet Free Flight. Since 1984, he has focused most of his attention on jazz performance and flute pedagogy.

== Biography ==
=== Early life ===
Walker was raised in Greenville, Kentucky and graduated from Central City High School in Central City, Kentucky. He attended the University of Louisville. After graduation, Walker joined the United States Military Academy Band at West Point; at the same time, he studied flute with Harold Bennett, principal flutist of the Metropolitan Opera Orchestra. Other significant teachers have been Sarah Fouse, Francis Fuge, James Pellerite, and Claude Monteux.

In 1969, he joined the Pittsburgh Symphony as associate principal flutist. After eight years in Pittsburgh, he was appointed by Zubin Mehta as principal flutist with the Los Angeles Philharmonic, a position he held from 1977 until 1984. He also played principal flute for the New York Philharmonic (under Mehta) for that orchestra's 1982 South American tour.

=== Jazz career ===
In 1980, Walker organized a jazz quartet featuring flute, piano, bass and drums. This group later become known as Free Flight. In 1984, he left the Los Angeles Philharmonic to concentrate on his work with the quartet and to do freelance work in Southern California and beyond. "After 15 years as a classical player, it was enough", Walker said in 1987. "In the beginning, I felt I was playing honest, wonderfully inspiring music. But after hundreds of repetitions, it wasn't so inspiring."

He has collaborated with many other flutists including James Galway and Jean-Pierre Rampal, and has also worked with other well-known musicians including Wayne Shorter, Leonard Bernstein, Dudley Moore and many others in concert and recordings.

=== Educational positions ===
Walker is currently on the faculty of the USC Thornton School of Music and the Colburn School.

He has been visiting professor at Duquesne University, the University of North Texas, University of Texas at Austin, and Arizona State University.

He has conducted flute master classes and clinics in the U.S., Canada, Europe, South America, Korea, Japan and Russia.

=== Recordings ===
Walker's discography includes with Free Flight the albums The Jazz/Classical Union (1982), Soaring (1983), Beyond the Clouds (1984), Illumination (1986) and Slice of Life (1989), Free Flight 2000 (1999), A Free Flight Christmas (2002), and Free Flight: Forever (2012).

Walker's solo albums are Freeflight (1987), Private Flight (1990), Music for Flute and Piano (1995), Jim Walker Plays the Classics (with Sara Davis Buecher on piano), Dancing Hearts: The Music of Bryan Pezzone (with Bryan Pezzone on piano), Dancing Hearts (Bryan Pezzone on piano) and D'Drum.

Walker has recorded with pianist Mike Garson on duo albums Flight of the Dove (1983), Reflections (1985), Flute Solos for the Performing Artist (1994), Walker & Garson Play Gershwin (1999), Pied Piper (2010), and The Music of George Gershwin (2012).

Lee Ritenour and Dave Grusin invited Walker to play on two tracks by Manuel de Falla on their 2006 album Two Worlds A live concert video is still being played on the Bravo and Arts & Entertainment (A&E) networks.

Walker appeared with the Los Angeles Guitar Quartet (LAGQ) on their 1998 album L.A.G.Q., performing on Chick Corea's "Spain" and on their 2002 album LAGQ Latin (2002), featured on a new composition entitled "SZSYGY". He joined classical guitarist Scott Tennant on his 1998 album Wild Mountain Thyme (Celtic Music for Guitar), performing Ian Krouse's "Da Chara (Two Friends)”.

More recent Free Flight recordings are Free Flight 2000 (1996) on Warner Bros. Publication. Two additional CDs are available as part of the Yamaha Disklavier catalog: Free Flight 2004 and A Free Flight Christmas.

Walker's flute solos are included in movie soundtracks, including Nijinsky (1980), A River Runs Through It (1992), Far and Away (1992), Nell (1994), Two If by Sea (1996), Amistad (1997), The River (1997), Seven Years in Tibet, Titanic, A Beautiful Mind (2001), Monsters, Inc. (2001), Ice Age (2002) and Memoirs of a Geisha (2005).

He is one of four performing artists (with Wynton Marsalis, James Galway and Eddie Daniels) to be named as members of the Board of Advisors for "Smartmusic", a computer program which provides music accompaniments.

Walker is a member of the board of directors of the National Flute Association. He is a Featured Artist for Burkart Flutes and Piccolos, performing on a gold Elite model flute.

He was given the "Distinguished Alumni Award" from the University of Louisville, and was named the first "Alumni Fellow" from the university's School of Music.

Walker recently made his debut at the Western International Band Clinic in Seattle, Washington, where he appeared as guest soloist with the Phoenix and Thunderbird honor bands.

== Discography ==
Solo

- Freeflight (1987, Voss Records)
- Private Flight (1990, Tall Tree Records)
- Music for Flute and Piano (1995)
- Jim Walker Plays the Classics (with Sara Davis Buecher on piano)
- Dancing Hearts: The Music of Bryan Pezzone (Bryan Pezzone on piano)
- D'Drum

With Free Flight

- The Jazz/Classical Union (1982)
- Soaring (1983, Palo Alto)
- Beyond the Clouds (1984, Palo Alto, Hindsight)
- Illumination (1986, Columbia)
- The Best of Free Flight (1988, compilation)
- Slice of Life (1989, Columbia)
- Free Flight 2000 (1999, CPP)
- A Free Flight Christmas (2002)
- Free Flight: Forever (2012)

Duos with pianist Mike Garson

- Flight of the Dove (1983)
- Reflections (1985, Reference Recordings)
- Flute Solos for the Performing Artist (1994, Alfred Publishing Company)
- Walker & Garson Play Gershwin (1999)
- Tranquility (2000)
- Jim Walker Plays the Music of Mike Garson (2007)
- Pied Piper (2010)
- The Music of George Gershwin (2012)
