= The Perfect Release =

Studio album by Annette Peacock
- Released: 1979
- Studios: Konk Studios, London; Scorpio Sound, London
- Genres: Jazz, rock
- Length: 35:54
- Labels: Aura; AUL 707
- Producer: Annette Peacock

Annette Peacock chronology
X-Dreams (1978)	The Perfect Release (1979)	Sky Skating (1982)

The Perfect Release is an album by Annette Peacock. It was recorded in London, and was released in 1979 by Aura Records. On the album, Peacock is joined by guitarist Robert Ahwai, keyboardist Max Middleton, bassist John McKenzie, drummer Richard Bailey, and percussionists Darryl Lee Que and Lennox Laington.

In an interview, Peacock stated that she had heard Jeff Beck's album Blow by Blow prior to its release, and decided she wanted to record with the band. (Middleton and Bailey both appeared on Beck's album.)

The contents of the album were reissued by Sanctuary Records on the 2004 compilation My Mama Never Taught Me How to Cook: The Aura Years 1978–1982.

== Reception ==
Professional ratings
Review scores
Source	Rating
AllMusic	4.5/5 stars

In a review for AllMusic, Thom Jurek stated that the album "nearly was perfect," and wrote: "if the record's not a masterpiece it is something close... it is a record that stands the test of time very well, and is one she is able to be proud of as an artist to this day."

In an article for Flood Magazine, Ad Amorosi commented: "With Peacock sing-speaking/howling like a cross between Kenneth Rexroth and Ornette Coleman... these languorous, extended melodies slip and slide handsomely from song to song in a symmetrical fashion."

A reviewer for Billboard remarked: "The music is often low key but the singing is insistent. Yet it is seductive, as if the singer is a bit abashed about the content of her urgent polysyllabic and libidinal messages. It is intelligent stuff, and winning in its own way."

== Track listing ==
All compositions by Annette Peacock.

1. "Love's Out to Lunch" – 2:22
2. "Solar Systems" – 3:06
3. "American Sport" – 3:43
4. "A Loss of Consciousness" – 3:41
5. "Rubber Hunger" – 4:21
6. "The Succubus" – 3:48
7. "Survival" – 14:51

== Personnel ==
- Annette Peacock – vocals
- Robert Ahwai – guitar
- Max Middleton – keyboards
- John McKenzie – bass
- Richard Bailey – drums
- Darryl Lee Que – percussion
- Lennox Laington – percussion, steel drums
