= Sticks and Stones and Broken Bones =

Studio album by the Toll
- Released: 1991
- Genre: Rock
- Length: 56:04
- Label: Geffen
- Producers: Matt Wallace, the Toll

The Toll chronology
The Price of Progression (1988)	Sticks and Stones and Broken Bones (1991)

Sticks and Stones and Broken Bones is the second and final album by the American band the Toll, released in 1991. The band supported the album by touring with the Ramones. The first single was "One Last Wish".

== Critical reception ==
Professional ratings
Review scores
Source	Rating
AllMusic	3/5 stars
Chicago Tribune	4/4 stars

The Washington Post wrote that "the Toll has succeeded in fashioning a thoroughly mainstream American-rock sound that's subtly enlivened by deft borrowings from Britain." The Chicago Tribune noted that the "producer Matt Wallace also has worked with the Replacements and Faith No More, and The Toll fits perfectly midway between those two bands." The Roanoke Times opined that the "music is middle-of-the-road: heavy enough to satisfy headbangers but not blaring enough to produce headaches."

== Track listing ==
1. "Tongue-Tied River" – 3:27
2. "Boys Are Bustin' Bricks" – 3:00
3. "One Last Wish" – 5:03
4. "Something 'Bout the Struggle" – 3:22
5. "Hear Your Brother Calling" – 6:02
6. "War Is Release" – 3:52
7. "Standing on the Ledge" – 5:05
8. "American Mess" – 5:13
9. "Happy" – 5:07
10. "Never Enough" – 4:41
11. "Colorblind" – 3:54
12. "Sweet Misery" – 7:08

All songs written by Brad Circone/Rick Silk/Brett Mayo/Greg Bartram

== Personnel ==
- Brad Circone – Vocals, guitars, harmonica, piano
- Rick Silk – Guitars, vocals (background)
- Brett Mayo – Drums, vocals (background), percussion
- Greg Bartram – Bass, vocals (background)
- Becky Spaan – Vocals (background)
- Brett B. – Raps
- Todd Jasmin – Piano on "Sweet Misery"
- Philip Cho – Reading on "American Mess"
- Matt Wallace – Producer, guitars, vocals (background)
- The Toll – Co-producer
