= Anxcity =

EP by Mike Garson
- Released: 2007
- Genres: Avant Garde Electronica, experimental jazz
- Label: MG&A
- Producer: Mike Garson

Mike Garson chronology
Part of the Whole (EP) (2006)	Anxcity (2007)	Hope In Forgotten places (2007)

Professional ratings
Review scores
Source	Rating
Regenmag Review	4.0/5 stars

Anxcity is the second solo EP by jazz pianist Mike Garson. It was released in 2007 on MG&A Records.

== Track listing ==
1. Radio Static Lies
2. Anxcity
3. Collapsing Cities
4. The Quandry
