= Improvisie =

Live album by Paul Bley
- Released: 1971
- Recorded: March 26, 1971
- Venue: Club B14, Rotterdam, Holland
- Genre: Jazz
- Length: 37:36
- Label: America (AM 6121)
- Producer: Pierre Berjot

Paul Bley chronology
The Paul Bley Synthesizer Show (1971)	Improvisie (1971)	Dual Unity (1972)

Improvisie is a live album by Paul Bley with Annette Peacock and Han Bennink which was released on the French America label in 1971.

== Reception ==
Professional ratings
Review scores
Source	Rating
Allmusic	4.5/5 stars
The Penguin Guide to Jazz	3/4 stars

Allmusic awarded the album 4½ stars observing "There are two pieces on the set, the elegiac title cut, which is nearly 14 minutes in length, and the much more adventurous "Touching," which is nearly 24. On "Improvisie," elements of jazz phrasing and harmony usher in the piece haltingly, purposefully, almost reverently... Even 35 years later, "Touching" is still a brave and uncompromising work, one that asks as many questions as it answers, and one that renews its freshness with each repeated listening". The Penguin Guide to Jazz stated "It was Peacock who got Bley interested in synthesisers and even at this early stage their mutual explorations of electronic sounds is extremely impressive".

== Track listing ==
1. "Improvisie" (Annette Peacock, Han Bennink, Paul Bley) – 13:53
2. "Touching" (Peacock) – 23:43
- Recorded at Club B14 in Rotterdam, Holland on March 26, 1971

== Personnel ==
- Paul Bley – electric piano, synthesizer
- Annette Peacock – electric bass, electric piano, piano, vocals
- Han Bennink – drums
