= X-Dreams =

Studio album by Annette Peacock
- Released: 1978
- Recorded: 1975
- Studios: Essex Studios, London W1
- Genres: Jazz, rock
- Label: Aura
- Producers: Aaron Sixx, Annette Peacock

Annette Peacock chronology
I'm the One (1972)	X-Dreams (1978)	The Perfect Release (1979)

X-Dreams is the second solo album by Annette Peacock, released in 1978.

Peacock had spent the previous four years recording material for the album in various studios. She recalled that a total of 22 musicians participated in the creation of the album: "most of them had never played together, and all the tracks were first takes. It was very exciting." Mick Ronson played on tracks 1, 5, 6 and 7. Peacock reflected: "There was an understanding between Mick and I, a mutual respect and admiration."

In an interview, Peacock stated that she approached the creation of the album as if it were two singles, "like each side was one piece... and the relationship between the two sides was important." Side A (tracks 1–3) was "very hard and aggressive," while side B (tracks 4–7) was "very romantic and kind of sweet."

The song "My Mama Never Taught Me How to Cook" is featured in the film Chasing Amy.

The contents of the album were reissued by Sanctuary Records on the 2004 compilation My Mama Never Taught Me How to Cook: The Aura Years 1978–1982.

== Reception ==
Professional ratings
Review scores
Source	Rating
AllMusic	4.5/5 stars
DownBeat	3/5 stars

Thom Jurek of Allmusic said, "there are no weak moments on X-Dreams, and despite its age, the album still sounds a bit ahead of its time."

In an article for Flood Magazine, Ad Amorosi wrote: "X-Dreams is stunning stuff that nearly 45 years after its initial moment has lost none of its punch or import."

Imran Khan, writing for PopMatters, commented: "X-Dreams depicts the endless streams of language found in dreams, a transient moment that has been frozen by the coiled magic of Peacock's words and her uncanny ability to capture an image in sound. Overall, it's a phantasmagorical exercise in harnessing the slipstreams of dreamed noises."

A reviewer for Head Heritage remarked: "Resigning the instrumentation to a battery of both jazz and rock musicians, her songs are all carefully thought out ruminations regarding love, relationships and general man/woman workings that are astonishingly clear and simple as they are frighteningly insightful."

An article at AltRockChick states: "Despite the lengthy, choppy recording 'process,' the gestalt is one of unity, of shared inspiration. X-Dreams is a remarkably engaging record, a full-on aesthetic experience that confirms Annette Peacock's stone-cold original status."

== Track listing ==
All compositions by Annette Peacock except where noted

1. "My Mama Never Taught Me How to Cook" 5:32
2. "Real and Defined Androgens" 11:01
3. "Dear Bela" 3:04
4. "This Feel Within" 5:21
5. "Too Much in the Skies" 4:55
6. "Don't Be Cruel" (Otis Blackwell, Elvis Presley) 4:37
7. "Questions" 2:54

== Personnel ==
- Annette Peacock – vocals, keyboards, synthesizer
- Dave Chambers – saxophone
- George Khan – saxophone
- Ray Warleigh – saxophone
- Peter Lemer – keyboards
- Tom Cosgrove – guitar
- Brian Godding – guitar
- Phil Lee – guitar
- Jim Mullen – guitar
- Mick Ronson – guitar
- Chris Spedding – guitar
- Jeff Clyne – bass
- Steve Cook – bass
- Kuma Harada – bass
- Peter Pavli – bass
- Stu Woods – bass
- Bill Bruford – drums
- John Halsey – drums
- Rick Marotta – drums
- Dave Sheen – drums
- Brother James – congas, percussion
- Darryl Lee Que – congas

== Production ==
- Aaron Sixx – executive producer
- Annette Peacock – producer
- John MacKenzie Burns – engineer
- Andrew Pearce – assistant engineer
- Bob Carlos Clarke – photography
