= Jazzical =

Studio album by Mike Garson
- Released: 1982
- Recorded: 1982
- Genre: Jazz, Classical
- Length: 55:26
- Label: Reference
- Producer: Mike Garson

Mike Garson chronology
Avant Garson (1979)	Jazzical (1982)	Serendipity (1986)

Jazzical is the second solo album by jazz pianist Mike Garson. It was released in 1982.

== Background ==
The expression "jazzical" was first used by Charles Mingus as the title of his two-part album Jazzical Moods (1955). "Jazzical" connotes a blend of jazz and classical musics, as does the musical theory third stream.

== Track listing ==
No.	Title	Length
1.	"Jazzical Suite"	9:26
2.	"Melancholy"	8:10
3.	"Reverie"	2:54
4.	"Umpires"	3:20
5.	"Reflections"	4:47
6.	"You’re One Of A Kind"	3:40
7.	"Prelude #4 In E Minor"	4:20
8.	"Song For Thee"	4:20

== Personnel ==
- Mike Garson - piano
- Abraham Laboriel - bass
- David Campbell - viola, string arrangements
- Carol Shive, Charles Veal - violin
- Chick Corea - synthesizer on "Song for Thee"
