= Heaven and Hull =

Studio album by Mick Ronson
- Released: May 10, 1994
- Genre: Rock
- Label: Epic
- Producer: Mick Ronson; Sham Morris; Bruce Fairbairn on "Like a Rolling Stone"

Mick Ronson chronology
Play Don't Worry (1975)	Heaven and Hull (1994)	Just Like This (1999)

Professional ratings
Review scores
Source	Rating
AllMusic	link
Music Week	3/5 stars

Heaven and Hull is the third solo album by Mick Ronson. Having been released in 1994 following his death the previous year, it was his first posthumous release. It featured collaborations by longtime friends of Ronson including David Bowie, Joe Elliott, and Ian Hunter. Other artists included Martin Chambers and Chrissie Hynde, Phil Collen and John Mellencamp. The "All the Young Dudes" track on Heaven and Hull is from the Freddie Mercury Tribute Concert, where Ronson was suffering from cancer. It was his last concert.

On the CD notes, there is a quote from Sham Morris, one of the album's producers:

During the making of Heaven and Hull (working title To Hull and Back), I asked Mick to visualize a characteristic from his home town of Hull. His first thought was the Humber Bridge. The bridge became very symbolic for those of us working on the album and it was his wish to incorporate it in the artwork. Mick has crossed the bridge now and left us this swan song."

The bridge shown in the album artwork is not the Humber Bridge.

Two songs from the album, "Midnight Love" and "Like a Rolling Stone" were included in the 2017 feature-length biographical documentary, and compilation Soundtrack, entitled Beside Bowie: The Mick Ronson Story.

== Track listing ==
All tracks composed by Mick Ronson and Sham Morris; except where indicated

1. "Don't Look Down" (Ronson, Colin Allen) – vocals by Joe Elliott
2. "Like a Rolling Stone" (Bob Dylan) – vocals by David Bowie
3. "When the World Falls Down"
4. "Trouble With Me" – vocals by Chrissie Hynde
5. "Life's a River" – vocals by John Mellencamp and Sham Morris
6. "You and Me" (Ronson, Suzanne Ronson)
7. "Colour Me" – lead vocals Mick Ronson, backing vocals David Bowie and Joe Elliott
8. "Take a Long Line" (Rick Brewster, Doc Neeson, John Brewster) – vocals by Ian Hunter and Joe Elliott
9. "Midnight Love" (Giorgio Moroder)
10. "All the Young Dudes" (Live at Freddie Mercury London Tribute) (David Bowie) – lead vocals by Ian Hunter; vocals by David Bowie, Joe Elliott and Phil Collen

== Personnel ==
- Mick Ronson – vocals, guitar, bass, all Instruments
- Sham Morris – guitar, keyboards, bass, vocals, drum machine
- Peter Noone, Rene Wurst, Peter Kinski – bass
- John Webster – keyboards
- Martin Chambers, Mick Curry, Martin Barker – drums
- Chrissie Hynde – vocals on "Trouble With Me"
- Brian May – guitar on "All the Young Dudes"
- Keith Scott – guitar on "Like A Rolling Stone"
- John Deacon – bass on "All the Young Dudes"
- Roger Taylor – drums on "All the Young Dudes"
- David Bowie – vocals, alto saxophone on "All the Young Dudes"
- Joe Elliott – vocals
- Ian Hunter – vocals
- John Mellencamp – vocals
- Sam Lederman, Steve Popovich, Suzanne Ronson – executive producers
