= Mike Garson =

American pianist (born 1945)

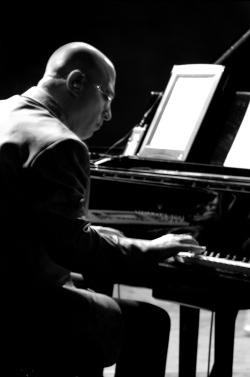
- Garson in Paris, 2006

Background information
- Born: Michael David Garson; July 29, 1945 (age 80); New York City, New York, U.S.
- Genres: Rock; glam rock; industrial; techno; jazz; funk; experimental; folk; instrumental; ambient
- Instruments: Piano, keyboards
- Works: Mike Garson discography
- Years active: 1964–present
- Website: mikegarson.com

Michael David Garson (born July 29, 1945) is an American pianist, who has worked with David Bowie, Nine Inch Nails, St. Vincent, Duran Duran, Free Flight, The Smashing Pumpkins, Melissa Auf der Maur, CSS and The Pretty Reckless.

== Early career ==
Garson went to Lafayette High School in Brooklyn. After graduating from Brooklyn College with a music degree in 1970, he was a member of rock/country/jazz band Brethren with Rick Marotta, Tom Cosgrove and Stu Woods. They recorded two albums, Brethren (1970) and Moment of Truth (1971), on the Tiffany label, which had guest piano and liner notes by Dr. John (and album photography by Murray Head, who scored a hit with "Say it Ain't So Joe", "Jesus Christ Superstar", and later with the single "One Night in Bangkok").

Garson played on the I'm the One (1972) album by early 1970s experimental artist Annette Peacock. David Bowie asked Peacock to join him on a tour; she declined, but Garson began an enduring working relationship with Bowie.

== Work with David Bowie ==
Garson was David Bowie's longest-serving and most frequently appearing band member. They performed together for both Bowie's first and last concerts in the United States as well as a thousand concerts around the globe in between.

Garson provided the piano and keyboard backing on the later Ziggy Stardust tour of 1972–73 and his contribution to the song "Aladdin Sane" (1973) gave the song an avant-garde jazz feel with lengthy and sometimes atonal piano solos.

I had told Bowie about the avant garde thing. When I was recording the "Aladdin Sane" track for Bowie, it was just two chords, an A and a G chord, and the band was playing very simple English rock and roll. And Bowie said: 'play a solo on this.' I had just met him, so I played a blues solo, but then he said: 'No, that's not what I want.' And then I played a Latin solo. Again, Bowie said: 'No no, that's not what I want.' He then continued: 'You told me you play that avant garde music. Play that stuff!' And I said: 'Are you sure? 'Cause you might not be working anymore!'. So I did the solo that everybody knows today, in one take. And to this day, I still receive emails about it. Every day. I always tell people that Bowie is the best producer I ever met, because he lets me do my thing.

Garson played also for Bowie's guitarist bandmate Mick Ronson on his first and last solo tour, and his first Slaughter on Tenth Avenue (1974) and second solo album Play Don't Worry (1975). Garson played with Bowie on and off over the years, resurfacing on The Buddha of Suburbia (1993) and 1. Outside (1995).

== Music career ==
External videos
- Oral History, Mike Garson reflects on his greatest musical influences. Interview date October 3, 2011, NAMM (National Association of Music Merchants) Oral History Library

Parallel to this work with Bowie, Garson engaged in his own solo career as a jazz pianist.

Garson worked with the reformed Spiders from Mars in 1975, alongside Mick Woodmansey, Trevor Bolder, Dave Black (guitar) and Pete McDonald (vocals). They recorded one eponymous album in 1976 before going their separate ways.

In 1984, Garson became a member of the jazz ensemble Free Flight, founded by flautist Jim Walker.

In 1993, Garson began a short-lived series of Screen Themes albums, jazz renditions of major themes and suites from film scores of 1993 (Man & a Woman, Sax at the Movies), and the following year, 1994 (Reel Romance). The latter album included the recording debut of Jessica L. Tivens, at age 13, who had previously appeared on the American television show Star Search. Both albums were released by Discovery Records.

Garson joined in The Smashing Pumpkins for their 1998 Adore tour, playing piano, keyboards and synthesizer. After the tour, he joined The Smashing Pumpkins guitarist Billy Corgan on his solo effort—the soundtrack for the 1999 supernatural horror film Stigmata. Additionally Garson played piano on The Smashing Pumpkins next 2000 album Machina/The Machines of God on the songs "Glass and the Ghost Children" and "With Every Light".

Garson has also played on Nine Inch Nails 1999 album The Fragile, in 2000 with No Doubt and Perry Farrell, in 2007 with St. Vincent, and many others. Garson collaborated with Nine Inch Nails singer Trent Reznor again on for the Grammy nominated score to the 2014 Gone Girl film on which they collaborated and Garson performed.

Garson played piano on the songs "This is the Life for Me" and "Washed Out to Sea" from Something for Kate's 2006 album Desert Lights. He became acquainted with the band when they opened all shows on the Australian leg of David Bowie's A Reality Tour in 2004.

Garson appeared on Myspace with his own music site, and to date has released some 50 free tracks. He is currently working on three new albums, as well as collaborating with several bands as touring player/session musician. His latest collaboration shows up on the last "met-on-Myspace" French artist Kuta's 2007 album A Home. Garson also contributed to and received co writing credit on the track "Something Unseen" by Athens, Georgia, based power pop band Chris McKay & the Critical Darlings. He has also been collaborating with the Norwegian band Sleepyard. In addition to this, he worked on the writing and recording of two songs on mathcore band The Dillinger Escape Plan's 2010 release, Option Paralysis. In this year he also collaborated with Melissa Auf der Maur on her second album Out of Our Minds, playing piano in two songs "The Hunt" and "Father's Grave".

Garson premiered a new commissioned work in 2014, written in collaboration with medical patients in partnership with brain surgeon Dr. Christopher Duma of the Foundation for Neuroscience, Stroke and Recovery. Garson's work, a set of movements of original music compositions, titled "Symphonic Healing Suite" which will continue with the National Symphony in 2016 along with Garson's latest solo album release.

A comprehensive biography of Garson's life and career to date was published in 2015, under the title Bowie's Piano Man: The Life of Mike Garson, by Clifford Slapper.

== Later work ==
Garson performed in the concert series Celebrating David Bowie from early 2017 through early 2018 and headlined a tour of the UK in November 2017 with his Aladdin Sane tour. Mike and fellow David Bowie band alumni began touring in 2018 with a new show A Bowie Celebration: The David Bowie Alumni Tour and continued the tour each year since.

Garson has endorsed M-Audio keyboards, and has performed a demo recording uses the company's digital piano.

In December 2018, Garson returned to perform with both The Smashing Pumpkins and Nine Inch Nails in separate Los Angeles area concerts. Mike continued his collaboration with Reznor in 2019, composing the opening piano number for his HBO series Watchmen score.

In 2020, Garson's Bowie alumni tour returned to play the Diamond Dogs and Ziggy Stardust albums in their entirety only to be stopped by the COVID-19 pandemic after having performed just a portion of their previously scheduled tour dates.

In October 2020, Garson announced he would be producing an online livestream concert on January 8, 2021 – what would have been Bowie's birthday and the weekend of the fifth anniversary of Bowie's passing called "A Bowie Celebration: Just For One Day!" with an array of Bowie alumni band members spanning the history of Bowie's albums and tours from beginning to end.

In May 2021, Duran Duran announced their upcoming studio album will include contributions from Garson. Garson is also featured on the If I Can't Have Love, I Want Power album by Halsey on its bonus track "People Disappear Here".

Garson also appeared on two songs on Def Leppard's 2022 album, Diamond Star Halos. In this year he also collaborated with The Pretty Reckless on their cover album Other Worlds, in their cover of Bowie's "Quicksand".

== Personal life ==
Garson married his wife Susan on March 24, 1968. They have two daughters, Jennifer and Heather, and seven grandchildren. They lived in Bell Canyon, California, where Garson had his recording studio, until the Woolsey Fires hit, leveling both Garson's home and studio.

Garson joined the Church of Scientology in 1970, having been introduced to it by Chick Corea. While he played with Bowie he advocated Scientology to the other members of the Spiders from Mars, with Woodmansey converting as a result. Garson left the Church in 1982.

== Discography ==
- Avant Garson (Contemporary, 1979)
- Jazzical (1982)
- Serendipity (Reference Recordings, 1986)
- Remember Love (1989)
- The Mystery Man (1990)
- Oxnard Sessions, Vol.1 (Reference, 1990)
- A Gershwin Fantasia (Reference, 1992)
- Oxnard Sessions, Vol.2 (Reference, 1992)
- Now! Music (Volume IV) (1998)
- Homage to My Heroes (2003)
- Conversations with My Family (Resonance, 2008)
- Lost in Conversation (2008)
- Mike Garson's Jazz Hat (Reference, 2008)
- The Bowie Variations (Reference, 2011, HDCD)
- Wild Out West (2012)
- Symphonic Suite for Healing (2015)
- Monk Fell On Me (2016)
- Unleashed Volumes 1-6 (2020)

With David Bowie

- Aladdin Sane (1973)
- Pin Ups (1973)
- Diamond Dogs (1974)
- David Live (1974)
- Young Americans (1975)
- Ziggy Stardust - The Motion Picture (1983)
- Black Tie White Noise (1993)
- The Buddha of Suburbia (1993)
- Santa Monica '72 (1994)
- Outside (1995)
- Earthling (1997)
- Bowie at the Beeb (2000)
- Heathen (2002)
- Reality (2003)
- Hours (2004 bonus track)
- VH1 Storytellers (David Bowie album) (2009)
- A Reality Tour (album) (2010)
- Nothing Has Changed - The Very Best of Bowie (2014)
- David Bowie - Five Years (1969–1973) (2015)
- David Bowie - Who Can I Be Now? (1974–1976) (2016)
- Glastonbury 2000 (2018)
- I'm Only Dancing: Soul Tour '74 (2020)
- Ouvrez Le Chien (Live Dallas '95) (2020)
- No Trendy Réchauffé (Live Birmingham '95) (2020)
- LiveAndWell.com) (2020)
- Look at the Moon! (Live Phoenix Festival '97) (2021)
- Something in the Air (Live Paris '99) (2021)
- David Bowie at the Kit Kat Klub (Live New York '99) (2021)
