= Oxnard Sessions, Vol.2 =

Oxnard Sessions, Vol. II

Studio album by Mike Garson
- Released: 1992
- Recorded: 1992
- Genre: Classical, Jazz
- Length: 73:50
- Label: MG&A
- Producer: Mike Garson

Mike Garson chronology
| A Gershwin Fantasia (1992) | Oxnard Sessions, Vol. II (1992) | Now! Music (Volume IV) (1998) |

Professional ratings
Review scores
| Source | Rating |
|---|---|
| Allmusic | link |

Oxnard Sessions, Vol.2 is the seventh solo album by jazz pianist Mike Garson. It was originally released in 1992 and was later re-released in 2008 by Allegro Records as the album Jazzhat.

== Track listing ==
| No. | Title | Writer(s) | Length |
|---|---|---|---|
| 1. | "Rumble" | Mike Garson | 5:04 |
| 2. | "All Blues" | Miles Davis | 9:49 |
| 3. | "It’s You or No One" | Sammy Cahn, Jule Styne | 5:22 |
| 4. | "A Song For You" | Leon Russell | 10:29 |
| 5. | "Waltz For Bill" | Garson | 7:13 |
| 6. | "Rebirth" | Chuck D, Cerwin Depper, Gary G-Wiz, Garson, Stuart Robertz | 6:09 |
| 7. | "A Night In Tunisia" | Dizzy Gillespie, Frank Paparelli | 7:13 |
| 8. | "Nardis" | Davis, Bill Evans | 6:19 |
| 9. | "Count Your Blessings (Instead of Sheep)" | Irving Berlin, Cole Porter | 8:32 |
| 10. | "I Get A Kick Out of You" | Porter | 4:43 |
| 11. | "In A Sentimental Mood" | Duke Ellington, Manny Kurtz, Irving Mills | 2:51 |
