= A Gershwin Fantasia =

Single album by Mike Garson
- Released: 1992
- Recorded: 1992
- Genre: Classical Jazz
- Length: 14:53
- Label: Reference Recordings
- Producer: Mike Garson

Mike Garson chronology
Oxnard Sessions, Vol.1 (1990)	A Gershwin Fantasia (1992)	Oxnard Sessions, Vol.2 (1992)

A Gershwin Fantasia is a single by jazz pianist Mike Garson, and was released in 1992. The lone track, "A Gershwin Fantasia" is a medley of tracks by George Gershwin, given an avant-garde treatment by Garson. In 2008 the track was combined with the Oxnard Sessions, Vol.2 and re-released as the album 'Jazzhat' by Allegro Records.

== Track listing ==
No.	Title	Length
1.	"A Gershwin Fantasia"	14:53
