= The Toll (band) =

American rock band

The Toll, 1991

The Toll was a rock band from Columbus, Ohio active from the mid-1980s to the early 1990s. It consisted of vocalist Brad Circone, guitarist Rick Silk, bassist Greg Bartram, and Brett Mayo on drums. Unusually, many of their songs incorporated spoken narratives. They had earned a reputation for their live performances and were signed to Geffen on the strength of a single show, although they had previously recorded a demo for Chrysalis.

The Toll's first album was The Price of Progression, and "Jonathan Toledo," which included one of the band's trademark narratives and clocked in at more than ten minutes, was the first single. It received rotation on MTV (including 120 Minutes) and for some time held the record as the longest non–Michael Jackson video ever played on the station. However, "Jonathan Toledo" failed to break the band, and the second single, "Soldier's Room," also went nowhere. The album was produced by Steve Thompson and Michael Barbiero, who engineered Guns N' Roses' album Appetite for Destruction.

Their second collection of songs, the concept album The Parable of Pariah, was rejected by Geffen, although several songs from it were re-recorded and included on their second album release, Sticks and Stones and Broken Bones. This record received almost no promotion from the label and did not do well, and Geffen dropped the band, which broke up soon afterward. The original studio demos from Parable of Pariah remain a fan favorite.

== Discography ==
- The Price of Progression, 1988
- Sticks and Stones and Broken Bones, 1991
