= Homage to My Heroes =

Studio album by Mike Garson
- Released: January 2004
- Recorded: 2003
- Genre: New-age
- Length: 74:00
- Label: MG&A
- Producer: Mike Garson

Mike Garson chronology
| Now! Music (Volume IV) (1998) | Homage to My Heroes (2004) | Conversations with my Family (2008) |

Homage to My Heroes is the ninth solo album by jazz pianist Mike Garson, and was released in 2003.

== Track list ==
| No. | Title | Length |
|---|---|---|
| 1. | "Homage to Chopin and Godowsky, for piano" | 1:48 |
| 2. | "Nocturne for piano in D flat major, Op. 2" | 2:43 |
| 3. | "Piano Sonata No. 13" | 7:59 |
| 4. | "Butterfly, for piano" | 2:10 |
| 5. | "Homage to Ligeti, version for piano" | 2:12 |
| 6. | "Nocturne for piano in B minor" | 1:55 |
| 7. | "3 x 18, for piano" | 6:27 |
| 8. | "God Speaks 4, for piano" | 2:48 |
| 9. | "Prelude for piano in C minor" | 1:11 |
| 10. | "Prelude for piano in F minor" | 1:07 |
| 11. | "Prelude for piano in A minor, Op. 3" | 0:41 |
| 12. | "Homage to Bach, for piano" | 1:07 |
| 13. | "For Arnold, for piano" | 4:44 |
| 14. | "For Ives, for piano" | 1:26 |
| 15. | "Homage to Prokofiev, for piano" | 1:30 |
| 16. | "Homage to Messiaen, for piano" | 7:29 |
