= Play Don't Worry =

Studio album by Mick Ronson
- Released: January 1975
- Recorded: 1974
- Studio: Trident and Scorpio Sound, London
- Genre: Rock
- Length: 36:25
- Label: RCA
- Producer: Mick Ronson

Mick Ronson chronology
Slaughter on 10th Avenue (1974)	Play Don't Worry (1975)	Heaven and Hull (1994)

Singles from Play Don't Worry
- 1. "Billy Porter" Released: 1974

Professional ratings
Review scores
Source	Rating
AllMusic	3/5 stars
Classic Rock	6/10 stars

Play Don't Worry is the second album by English guitarist and singer Mick Ronson, recorded in 1974 and released in January 1975 after his several projects in the early seventies together with David Bowie, Lou Reed and the band the Spiders from Mars. It contains mainly covers arranged by Ronson for his own sound, covering everyone from Pure Prairie League, The Velvet Underground and Little Richard. The backing track to "White Light/White Heat" was salvaged from Bowie's Pin Ups sessions. The title track was co-written by Bob Sargeant, later producer to The Beat amongst others, who released an album First Starring Role in April 1974 which included Ronson on recorder and producing four tracks.

== Track listing ==
Side one

1. "Billy Porter" (Mick Ronson) – 3:30
2. "Angel No. 9" (Craig Fuller) – 5:31
3. "This Is for You" (Laurie Heath) – 4:30
4. "White Light/White Heat" (Lou Reed) – 4:07

Side two

1. "Play Don't Worry" (Ronson, Bob Sargeant) – 3:15
2. "Hazy Days" (Ronson) – 4:10
3. "Girl Can't Help It" (Bobby Troup) – 2:45
4. "Empty Bed (Io Me Ne Andrei)" (Claudio Baglioni, Antonio Coggio, Ronson) – 5:12
5. "Woman" (Adam Taylor) – 3:25

=== CD edition bonus tracks ===
1. "Seven Days" (Annette Peacock) – 2:44 [Original B-Side]
2. "Stone Love (Soul Love)" (David Bowie) – 3:30
3. "I'd Rather Be Me" (Ronson) – 4:54
4. "Is There Life on Mars?" (Bob Barnes a.k.a. Roscoe West) – 4:14
5. "Pain in the City" (Ronson) – 3:45
6. "Dogs (French Girl)" (J.H. Burnett) – 3:49
7. "Seven Days" (Annette Peacock) – 6:01 [Alternate Take]
8. "28 Days Jam" (Ronson) – 6:23
9. "Woman" (Adam Taylor) – 3:32 [Alternate Take]

=== Charts ===
Chart (1975)	Peak position
Australia (Kent Music Report)	92
United Kingdom (Official Charts Company)	29

== Personnel ==
- Mick Ronson – guitar, bass, drums, harmonica, piano, clavinet, synthesizer, vocals
- Trevor Bolder – bass, horn
- Mike Garson – piano
- Ritchie Dharma, Aynsley Dunbar, Tony Newman – drums
- Jeff Daly – saxophone, flutes
- Neil Kernon – ARP synthesizer on "Billy Porter" and "This Is for You"
- Paul Francis – drums on "Play Don't Worry"
- John Mealing – piano on "Woman"
- Ian Hunter – backing vocals on "Girl Can't Help It"
- Vicky Silva, Miquel Brown, Beverly Baxton – backing vocals on "Angel No.9" and "Woman"
- Sid Sax – string conductor on "Empty Bed (Io Me Ne Andrei)"

== Charts ==
=== Weekly charts ===
1975 weekly chart performance for Play Don't Worry
Chart (1975)	Peak Position
UK Albums (OCC)	29

== Production ==
- Engineered by Dennis Mackay, Peter Fielder, Ted Sharp, Ray Hendrickson and Ian Major
  - Track 01-10: recorded and mixed at Strawberry Studios, Juan La Pins, South of France, Trident Studios and Scorpio Sound, London, 1974.
  - Track 11–15: recorded and mixed at Sundragon Studios, 13–14 December 1975.
  - Track 16–18: mixed August 1997 by Lestyn at Dana Studios, London.
  - All tracks produced, arranged and conducted by Mick Ronson for Mainman.
- Clive Arrowsmith – photography
