= Now! Music (Volume IV) =

Studio album by Mike Garson
- Released: November 2003
- Recorded: 2003
- Genre: Jazz fusion
- Length: 72:00
- Label: MG&A
- Producer: Mike Garson

Mike Garson chronology
Oxnard Sessions, Vol.2 (1992)	Now! Music (Volume IV) (2003)	Homage to My Heroes (2003)

Now! Music (Volume IV) is the eighth solo album by jazz pianist Mike Garson, and was released in 2003.

== Track listing ==
No.	Title	Length
1.	"Ballade in G sharp Minor"	5:40
2.	"Nocturne in B Minor"	1:47
3.	"Sonata No. 3"	5:21
4.	"Now 41"	1:47
5.	"Now 36"	1:21
6.	"Sonata No. 4"	4:50
7.	"Tremelando"	7:00
8.	"Sonata No. 9"	11:18
9.	"Prelude in A Minor, Op. 3"	3:46
10.	"Now 89"	2:13
11.	"Sonata No. 13"	7:20
12.	"Humoresque"	0:35
13.	"Octaves"	1:37
14.	"Rhapsody No. 2"	3:14
15.	"Scherzo for piano in Bb Minor"	3:07
