= Sleepyard =

Norwegian psychedelic pop band

- Origin: Stavanger, Norway
- Genres: Psychedelic pop Ambient
- Years active: 1994–present
- Labels: Orange music, Trust Me Records, Oatcake Records, Agartha, Global Recording Artists, CCAP, Apollon Records
- Website: sleepyard.com

Sleepyard is a psychedelic band from Norway formed by Oliver and Svein Kersbergen in 1994.

After a couple of demo cassette releases, the band released the minialbum “Intersounds” on their own label Orange music in 1998. This was hailed as one of the first post rock albums from Norway.

Sleepyard released “The runner” on trust me records (2003) and contributed music to the movie Monsterthursday Next album "Easy Tensions" saw the band reaching for a more mellow and richer sound. Their multi tracked vocal harmonies reminded critics of the Beach Boys and drew comparisons to the psychedelic sound of Smile.

"Future lines" from 2009 saw the band move into a more jazzy and ambient direction. It featured contributions from Pianist Mike Garson and Sonic Boom from Spacemen 3

In 2010 the band collaborated with Jim Shepherd of The Jasmine Minks and released a 7" Down Tangerine Road on his Oatcake Records.

Oliver produced and co wrote a couple of tracks with Judy Dyble former vocalist for Fairport Convention during 2012. "Blue barracuda" was included on Füxa Dirty D album which came out on Rocket Girl in summer 2013. The rest did end up on the next Sleepyard album, Black Sails. A new version of "Blue Barracuda" was released on 2018 album Winter Crickets.

"Wall Of Confusion" was a split cassette release with Devita on Lithuanian label Agharta Tapes. It featured Sleepyard with experimental noise recordings in tribute to composer Karlheinz Stockhausen.

Sleepyard released Black Sails on US label Global Recording Artists in March 2014. This album featured special guest musicians Judy Dyble, Geoff Leigh and Mike Garson. Dawn Smithson known from experimental rock band Jessamine, Nik Turner formerly of space rock band Hawkwind on a version of The Seeds Chocolate River.

Sleepyard signed with Norwegian label Apollon Records and released the album Head Values in 2022. The album featured Sandy Dedrick from the 60`s sunshine pop band The Free Design on vocals for the track "Falling In Love". Other guest musicians count Katje Janisch, Mark Refoy known from Spacemen 3 and Spiritualized and Kjetil Manheim formerly of the Norwegian Black Metal band Mayhem. This album showed the band going in a more ambient and electronic direction.

Following year saw the release of the digital single "Soul Cruiser" which featured Suzanne Ciani as a guest musician.

== Discography ==
- Intersounds (1999) Orange Music
- The Runner (2003) Trust Me Records
- Easy Tensions (2006) Orange Music
- Future Lines (2009) Orange Music
- Down Tangerine Road 7" (2010) Oatcake Records
- Wall Of Confusion (Split release with Devita) (2013) Agharta Tapes
- Black Sails (2014) Global Recording Artists
- Winter Crickets (2018) Global Recording Artists
- Head Values (2022) Apollon Records
- Soul Cruiser (2023) (Digital Single) Apollon Records
