= The Price of Progression (The Toll album) =

Studio album by the Toll
- Released: 1988
- Recorded: Bearsville, Bearsville, NY
- Genre: Rock
- Length: 58:16
- Label: Geffen
- Producers: Steve Thompson, Michael Barbiero

The Toll chronology
The Price of Progression (1988)	Sticks and Stones and Broken Bones (1991)

The Price of Progression is an album by the Columbus, Ohio, rock band the Toll, released in 1988. The first single was "Jonathan Toledo". It was produced by Steve Thompson and Michael Barbiero.

== Critical reception ==
Professional ratings
Review scores
Source	Rating
The Philadelphia Inquirer	1/4 stars

The Philadelphia Inquirer wrote: "So unremittingly annoying, so ostentatiously pretentious, so utterly lacking in anything approaching a sense of humor, this album exerts a certain fascination." The Washington Post called the album "heavy-handed, uneven, feverishly melodramatic and occasionally overwrought."

== Track listing ==
1. "Jazz Clone Clown" – 4:00
2. "Jonathan Toledo" – 10:00
3. "Smoke Another Cigarette" – 4:19
4. "Soldier's Room" – 3:34
5. "Word of Honor" – 4:11
6. "Anna-41-Box" – 10:33
7. "Tamara Told Me" – 4:32
8. "Living in the Valley of Pain" – 11:19
9. "Stand in Winter" – 5:32

All songs written by Brad Circone/Rick Silk/Brett Mayo/Greg Bartram

== Personnel ==
- Brad Circone – Vocals, guitars, piano
- Rick Silk – Guitars, vocals (background)
- Brett Mayo – Drums, vocals (background)
- Greg Bartram – Bass, vocals (background)
- Mick Ronson – Lead guitar on "Stand in Winter"
- Lenny Pickett – Saxophone on "Smoke Another Cigarette"
- Michael Barbiero – Producer, engineer
- Steve Thompson – Producer
