= Avant Garson =

Studio album by Mike Garson
- Released: 1980
- Recorded: November 20 & 21, 1979
- Studio: Love Castle Studios, Los Angeles, California
- Genre: Jazz
- Label: Contemporary; C 14003
- Producer: John Koenig, Mike Garson, Chick Corea

Mike Garson chronology
Avant Garson (1980)	Jazzical (1982)

Avant Garson is the debut solo album by American jazz pianist Mike Garson, released on the Contemporary label.

== Reception ==
The Allmusic review states "Pianist Mike Garson's debut as a leader shows off his virtuosity and versatility on a set of unaccompanied solos. The music is consistently colorful and full of surprises, ranging from the melodic to bordering on the avant-garde".

Professional ratings
Review scores
Source	Rating
Allmusic	3/5 stars

== Track listing ==
All compositions by Mike Garson; except as indicated.

1. "Portrait of Chick" - 7:10
2. "Someday My Prince Will Come" (Larry Morey, Frank Churchill) - 3:46
3. "Jennifer" - 1:59
4. "Avant Garson Part I" - 1:20
5. "Classical Improvisation with a Jazz Flavoring and a Touch of Jewish in D Minor" - 4:17
6. "Jewish Blues" - 3:22
7. "Over the Rainbow" (Harold Arlen, Yip Harburg) - 3:31
8. "How Deep is the Suppression" - 3:52
9. "Avant Garson II" - 2:17
10. "One Light Aesthetic Wave" - 0:38
11. "Chopin Visits Brooklyn" - 1:54
12. "Avant Gershwin" (George Gershwin, Garson) - 5:26

== Personnel ==
- Mike Garson – piano
