= Mick Ronson =

English musician (1946–1993)

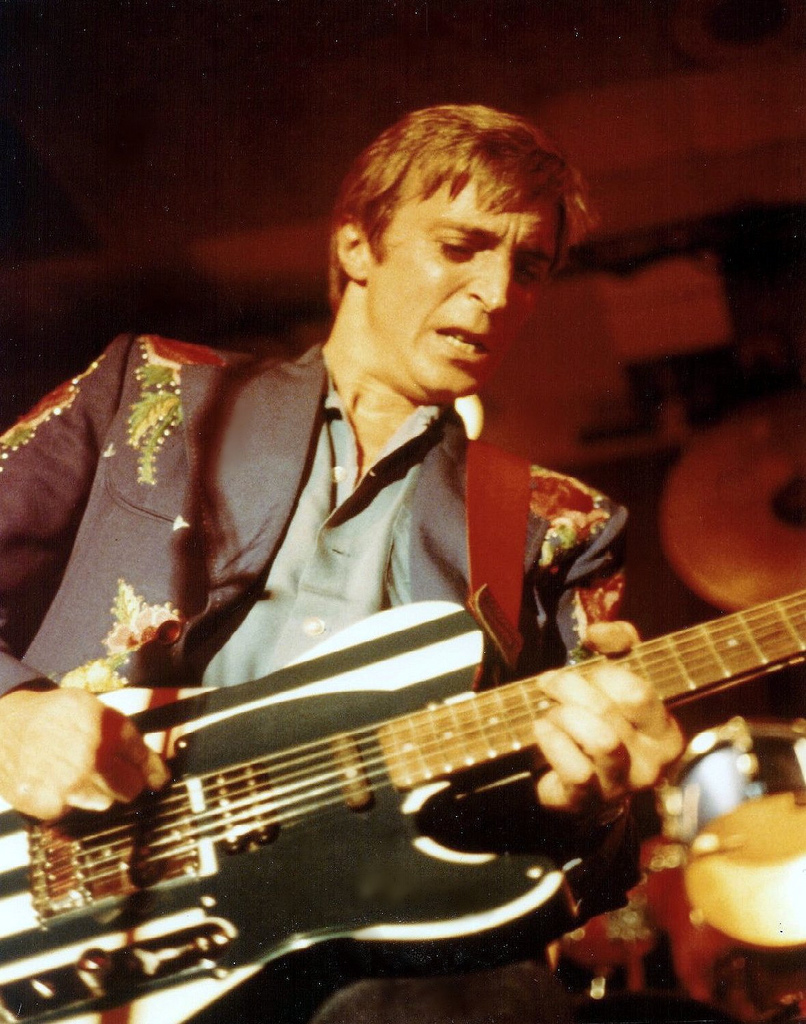
- Ronson in 1981

Background information
- Also known as: Ronno
- Born: Michael Ronson; 26 May 1946; Kingston upon Hull, Yorkshire, England
- Died: 29 April 1993 (aged 46) London, England
- Genres: Rock; glam rock
- Occupations: Musician; songwriter; arranger; producer
- Instruments: Guitar; piano; vocals
- Years active: 1966–1993
- Labels: RCA; Epic; Mercury; Virgin; Rykodisc; Vertigo

Michael Ronson (26 May 1946 – 29 April 1993) was an English musician, songwriter, arranger, and producer. He achieved critical and commercial success working with David Bowie as the guitarist of the Spiders from Mars. He was a session musician who recorded five studio albums with Bowie followed by four with Ian Hunter, and also played in touring bands with Van Morrison and Bob Dylan. A classically trained musician, Ronson was known for his melodic approach to guitar playing.

Ronson and Bowie produced Lou Reed's Transformer with Ronson playing guitar and piano and writing string arrangements, which brought him mainstream recognition. The album is considered an influential landmark of the glam rock genre, anchored by Reed's most successful single, "Walk on the Wild Side". In 2008, John Cougar Mellencamp credited Ronson for helping to arrange his most successful hit single, "Jack & Diane".

Ronson recorded three solo studio albums, the most popular being Slaughter on 10th Avenue, which reached No. 9 on the UK Albums Chart. He played with various bands after his time with Bowie. He was named the 64th-greatest guitarist of all time by Rolling Stone in 2003 and 41st in 2012 by the same magazine.

== Early life ==
Michael Ronson was born in Kingston upon Hull in East Riding. He was the first son of George and Minnie Ronson and had two younger siblings, Maggi and David. As a child, he was trained classically to play piano, recorder, violin, and (later) the harmonium. He initially wanted to be a cellist, but switched to guitar after discovering the music of Duane Eddy, whose bass notes on the guitar sounded to Ronson much like the cello. He joined his first band, The Mariners, in November 1963, when he was 17. His stage debut with The Mariners was in support of the Keith Herd Band at Brough Village Hall, a gig for which the band travelled 35 miles and were paid 10 shillings (50p). While Ronson was working with The Mariners, another local Hull group– The Crestas–recruited him on the advice of The Mariners' bassist John Griffiths. With Ronson on board, the Crestas gained a solid reputation, making regular appearances at local halls: Mondays at the Halfway House in Hull, Thursdays at the Ferryboat Hotel, Fridays at the Regal Ballroom in Beverley, and Sundays at the Duke of Cumberland in North Ferriby.

In 1965, Ronson left The Crestas, moving to London to seek work. He took a part-time job as a mechanic, and joined a band called The Voice, replacing Miller Anderson. Soon afterwards, Crestas' drummer Dave Bradfield went to London, replacing the Voice's previous drummer. After playing a few dates with the group, Ronson and Bradfield returned from a weekend in Hull to find their gear piled at their flat and a note explaining that the rest of the group had gone to the Bahamas. Ronson stayed in London and briefly teamed with a soul band called The Wanted, before eventually returning to Hull. In 1966, he joined Hull's top local band, The Rats, joining singer Benny Marshall, bassist Geoff Appleby, and drummer Jim Simpson (who was then replaced by Clive Taylor and later John Cambridge). The group played the local circuit, and made a few unsuccessful trips to London and Paris.

In 1967 The Rats recorded the one-off psychedelic track "The Rise and Fall of Bernie Gripplestone" at Fairview Studios in Willerby, East Riding and can be heard on the 2008 release, Front Room Masters – Fairview Studios 1966–1973. In 1968, the band changed their name briefly to Treacle and booked another recording session at Fairview Studios in 1969, before reverting to their original name. Around that time, Ronson was recommended by Rick Kemp to play guitar on Michael Chapman's Fully Qualified Survivor album. In 1968 Keith 'Ched' Cheesman joined The Rats replacing Geoff Appleby on bass and the line up of Ronson, Marshall, Cheesman, and Cambridge recorded "Guitar Boogie", "Stop and Get A Hold of Myself", and "Morning Dew" at Fairview Studios. When John Cambridge left The Rats to join his former Hullaballoos bandmate Mick Wayne in Junior's Eyes, he was replaced by Mick "Woody" Woodmansey. In November 1969, the band recorded a final session at Fairview, taping "Telephone Blues" and "Early in Spring".

In March 1970, during the recording sessions for Elton John's album Tumbleweed Connection, Ronson played guitar on the track "Madman Across the Water". The song, however, was not included in the original release. The recording featuring Ronson was released on the 1992 compilation album, Rare Masters, as well as the 1995 reissue and 2008 deluxe edition of Tumbleweed Connection.

== Bowie era ==
Early in 1970, John Cambridge went to Hull in search of Ronson, intent upon recruiting him for a new David Bowie backing band called The Hype. He found Ronson marking out a rugby pitch, one of his duties as a Parks Department gardener for Hull City Council. Having failed in his earlier attempts in London, Ronson was reluctant, but eventually agreed to accompany Cambridge to a meeting with Bowie. Two days later, on 5 February, Ronson made his debut with Bowie on John Peel's national BBC Radio 1 show.

The Hype played their first gig at The Roundhouse on 22 February with a line-up that included Bowie, Ronson, Cambridge, and producer/bassist Tony Visconti. The group dressed up in superhero costumes, with Bowie as Rainbowman, Visconti as Hypeman, Ronson as Gangsterman, and Cambridge as Cowboyman. Also on the bill that day were Bachdenkel, The Groundhogs, and Caravan. The next day they performed at the Streatham Arms in London under the pseudonym of 'Harry The Butcher'. They also performed on 28 February at the Basildon Arts Lab experimental music club at the Basildon Arts Centre in Essex, billed as 'David Bowie's New Electric Band'. Also on the bill were High Tide, Overson, and Iron Butterfly. Strawbs were due to perform but were replaced by Bowie's New Electric Band. John Cambridge left in March, again replaced by Woody Woodmansey. In April 1970, Ronson, Woodmansey, and Visconti started recording Bowie's The Man Who Sold the World album.

During the sessions for The Man Who Sold the World, the trio of Ronson, Visconti, and Woodmansey–still under The Hype moniker– signed to Vertigo Records. The group recruited Benny Marshall from The Rats as vocalist, and recorded an album. By the time a single appeared, The Hype had been renamed Ronno. "4th Hour of My Sleep" was released on Vertigo to an indifferent reception in January 1971. The song was written by Tucker Zimmerman. The B-side was a Ronson/Marshall song called "Powers of Darkness". The Ronno album was never completed.

Bowie's backing ensemble, which now included Trevor Bolder, who had replaced Visconti on bass guitar, and keyboardist Rick Wakeman, were used in the recording of Hunky Dory. The departure of Visconti meant that Ronson, with Bowie, took over the arrangements, while Ken Scott co-produced with Bowie. Hunky Dory featured Ronson's string arrangements on several tracks, including "Life On Mars?".

That band, minus Wakeman, became known as the Spiders from Mars from the title of the next Bowie album. Again, Ronson was a key part of The Rise and Fall of Ziggy Stardust and the Spiders from Mars, providing string arrangements and various instrumentation, as well as playing lead guitar. Ronson's guitar and arranging during the Spiders from Mars era provided much of the underpinning for later punk rock musicians. In 1972 Ronson provided a strings-and-brass arrangement for the song "Sea Diver" on the Bowie-produced All the Young Dudes album for Mott the Hoople. Ronson co-produced Lou Reed's album Transformer with Bowie, playing lead guitar and piano on the songs "Perfect Day" and "Satellite of Love". Again with Bowie, Ronson re-recorded and produced the track "The Man Who Sold the World" for Lulu, released as a single in the UK, and played on a few tracks on the Dana Gillespie album Weren't Born a Man. Ronson appeared on the 1972 country rock album Bustin' Out by Pure Prairie League, where he undertook string ensemble arrangements. Ronson recorded "Angel #9" for his second solo LP Play Don't Worry, and string arrangements on "Boulder Skies" and "Call Me, Tell Me" .

His guitar work was next heard on Bowie's Aladdin Sane and 1973 covers album Pin Ups. However, he was absent from the Diamond Dogs album released later. In September 1983 he was a special guest for the Toronto leg of the Serious Moonlight Tour, playing lead guitar during the performance of "The Jean Genie". He had only been asked to play the day before, and later recalled:

I was playing [Earl] Slick's guitar... I had heard Slick play solos all night so I decided not to play solos and I just went out and thrashed the guitar. I really thrashed the guitar, I was waving the guitar above my head and all sorts of things. It was funny afterwards because David said, 'You should have seen [Earl Slick's] face...' meaning he looked petrified. I had his prize guitar and I was swinging it around my head and Slick's going 'Waaaa... watch my guitar', you know. I was banging into it and it was going round my head. Poor Slick. I mean, I didn't know it was his special guitar, I just thought it was a guitar, a lump of wood with six strings.

Bowie said in a 1994 interview that "Mick was the perfect foil for the Ziggy character. He was very much a salt-of-the-earth type, the blunt northerner with a defiantly masculine personality, so that what you got was the old-fashioned Yin and Yang thing. As a rock duo, I thought we were every bit as good as Mick and Keith or Axl and Slash. Ziggy and Mick were the personification of that rock n roll dualism."

== Later work ==
After leaving Bowie's entourage after the "Farewell Concert" in 1973, Ronson released three solo albums. His solo debut Slaughter on 10th Avenue, featured a version of Elvis Presley's "Love Me Tender", as well as Ronson's most famous solo track, "Only After Dark". In addition, his sister, Margaret (Maggi) Ronson, provided the backing vocals for the set. Between this and the 1975 follow-up, Ronson had a short-lived stint with Mott the Hoople. Ronson then became a long-time collaborator with Mott's former leader Ian Hunter, commencing with the album Ian Hunter (UK No. 21) and featuring the UK Singles Chart No. 14 hit "Once Bitten, Twice Shy", including a spell touring as the Hunter Ronson Band.

In 1980, the live album Welcome to the Club was released, including a couple of Ronson contributions, although it also contained a few studio-based tracks – one of which was a Hunter/Ronson song. In 1974, Ronson secured the No. 2 spot from a reader's poll in Creem magazine of the best guitarists that year, with Jimmy Page taking first place and Eric Clapton in third place after Ronson. After having recorded, on his Slaughter on Tenth Avenue album, Annette Peacock's song I'm The One from her album of the same name, he played on tracks on her X-Dreams album. Ronson contributed guitar to the title track of the 1976 David Cassidy release Getting It in the Street. On 11 February 1977 the single "Billy Porter" (b/w "Seven Days") was released on RCA Victor Records, but did not chart. Roger Daltrey employed Ronson's guitar on his 1977 solo release One of the Boys. Ronson played guitar on two tracks on the Slaughter & The Dogs album Do It Dog Style in 1978. In 1979, Ronson and Hunter produced and played on the Ellen Foley debut album, Night Out, with "We Belong to the Night" and the hit single "What's a Matter Baby".

He also played guitar on Roger C. Reale's Reptiles in Motion album recorded in 1979 and not released until 2019, after the master tapes were acquired from the family of the original rights owners. The label Big Sound, based in Wallingford, Connecticut, had gone bust and the album remained unreleased for forty years.

In 1982, Ronson worked with John Mellencamp on his American Fool album, and in particular the song "Jack & Diane":

"I owe Mick Ronson the hit song 'Jack & Diane'. Mick was very instrumental in helping me arrange that song, as I'd thrown it on the junk heap. Ronson came down and played on three or four tracks and worked on the American Fool record for four or five weeks. All of a sudden, for 'Jack & Diane', Mick said 'Johnny, you should put baby rattles on there.' I thought, 'What the fuck does put baby rattles on the record mean? So he put the percussion on there and then he sang the part 'let it rock, let it roll' as a choir-ish-type thing, which had never occurred to me. And that is the part everybody remembers on the song. It was Ronson's idea." (John Mellencamp, Classic Rock magazine, January 2008, p.61)

Both "Jack & Diane" and American Fool topped their respective US Billboard charts. Ronson was recruited to Midge Ure's band for Ure's Gift tour in 1985. After weeks of rehearsal, Ronson left the band due to financial disagreements and was replaced by Zal Cleminson.

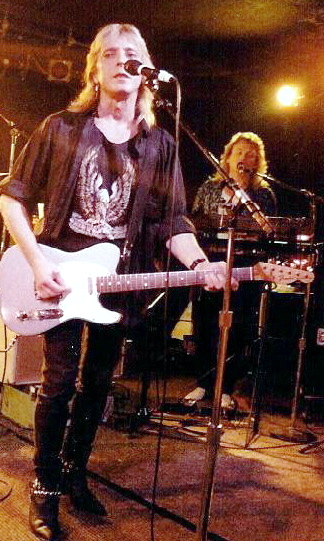
Ronson with Howard Helm, October 1988

In 1990, Ronson again collaborated with Hunter on the album YUI Orta, this time getting joint credit, as "Hunter/Ronson". One of the backing singers on the album was Carola Westerlund. While in Sweden, Ronson wrote and produced three new songs with Estelle Millburne and Westerlund as EC2: "I'm So Sorry"/"Kiss Me" (1990), then a second single as ECII: "Passion" with a B-side cover of J. Kilette and K. Brown's "I'm Forever Blowing Bubbles". In 1993, he again appeared on a Bowie album, Black Tie White Noise, playing on the track "I Feel Free", originally recorded by Cream. Ronson and Bowie had covered the track live 20 years earlier, while touring as Ziggy Stardust and the Spiders from Mars. Ronson also produced Bowie's cover of the Morrissey-penned "I Know It's Gonna Happen".

His second and third solo albums were Play Don't Worry in 1975, and Heaven and Hull in 1994. The latter set was only partly completed at the time of Ronson's death, and was released posthumously. Artists involved with the album included Bowie, John Mellencamp, Joe Elliott, Ian Hunter, Chrissie Hynde, and Martin Chambers. Besides working with Bowie and Hunter, Ronson was a musician, songwriter, and record producer with many other acts. He did not restrict his influence behind the recording desk only to established acts; his production work appears on albums by more obscure artists, such as Payolas, Phil Rambow and Los Illegals, The Mundanes, the Italian band Moda and the Dutch band Fatal Flowers. Ronson produced The Visible Targets, a Seattle-based group, on their 1983 five track EP, Autistic Savant. In 1985, he produced and played on the four song EP Stillwell Avenue with the NYC based band XDAVIS.

Ronson was also a member of Bob Dylan's "Rolling Thunder Revue" live band, and can be seen both on and off-stage in the film of the tour. He made a connection with Roger McGuinn during this time, which led to his producing and contributing guitar and arrangements to McGuinn's 1976 solo album Cardiff Rose. In 1982, he participated on lead guitar in a short-lived band with Hilly Michaels on drums and Les Fradkin on bass guitar. One of their recordings from this group, "Spare Change", appeared on Fradkin's 2006 album, Goin' Back. In 1987, Ronson made an appearance on a record by The Toll. Ronson played lead on the band's song, "Stand in Winter", from the album The Price of Progression.

In 1991, Ronson produced the Swedish cult band the Leather Nun's album, Nun Permanent, adding backing vocals and guitar overdubs on several tracks. At the end of the production, during a short visit to his sister in London, Ronson was diagnosed with cancer. In 1992 he produced Morrissey's album, Your Arsenal. In the same year, Ronson's final high-profile live performance was his appearance at The Freddie Mercury Tribute Concert. He played on "All the Young Dudes" with Bowie and Hunter; and "Heroes" with Bowie. Ronson's final recorded session was as a guest on Earth vs the Wildhearts, a 1993 album by the Wildhearts where he played the guitar solo on the song "My Baby is a Headf_". Liner notes for the Earth vs the Wildhearts album give credit to Mick Ronson for guitar on the track "My Baby Is A Headf_" and the "album is dedicated to Mick Ronson".

== Personal life ==
Ronson was married in Bearsville, New York in March 1977 to Suzanne (Suzi) Fussey, a hairdresser, who worked for David Bowie at the same time as Ronson. They had a daughter in 1977. Ronson had one son with his girlfriend Denise, and another with Carola Westerlund.

== Death and legacy ==
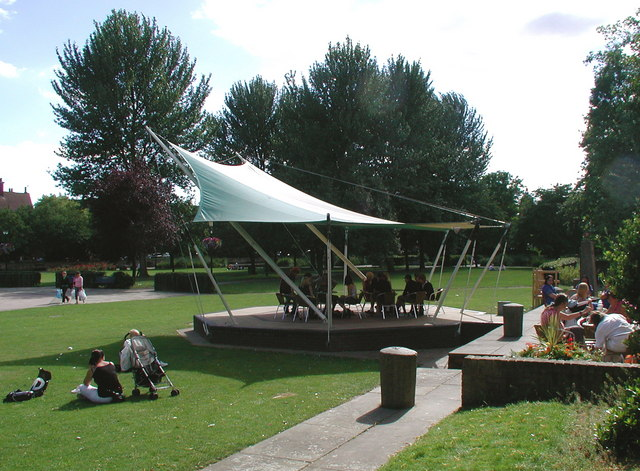
The Mick Ronson Memorial Stage in 2007

Ronson died of liver cancer on 29 April 1993. On 6 May, his funeral was held in a Mormon chapel in London, as he had grown up in The Church of Jesus Christ of Latter-day Saints.

In his memory, the Mick Ronson Memorial Stage was constructed in Queen's Gardens, Hull. In 2015, Steve Harley of Cockney Rebel pledged to help raise funds for a new memorial to Ronson. In April 2016, Harley played for free at the Hull City Hall to help kick start the appeal. A new 8-foot (2.4 m) guitar sculpture memorial to Ronson was unveiled on 2 June 2017 in Hull's East Park, where Ronson used to work as a gardener, now known as the Michael Ronson Garden of Reflection. As part of the Hull 2017 UK City of Culture event programme, a show entitled "Turn and Face the Strange" was created to tell Ronson's story, comprising audio recordings of people who grew up with him in Hull.

In August 2017 there were six performances, at the Freedom Centre on Preston Road, close to where Ronson had grown up and is buried. There was a second run of the show, at the larger Hull Truck Theatre, which played to another six shows, in February 2018, followed by a further ten shows in April and May 2019. In August 2019, a mural was completed in Bilton Grange.

=== Beside Bowie: The Mick Ronson Story ===
In October 2017 the documentary, Beside Bowie: The Mick Ronson Story, was released by Gross US and directed by Jon Brewer. The documentary covers Ronson's life and his first meeting with David Bowie, along with his influence on Bowie's rise to fame. With narration by David Bowie, archive footage and contributions from Bowie's ex-wife Angie, Ronson's sister, Maggi, and his wife, Suzanne Fussey, Lou Reed, Rick Wakeman, Tony Visconti, Ian Hunter, Bob Harris, and many others who knew or worked with Ronson.

== Discography ==
=== Solo ===
==== Albums ====
- Slaughter on 10th Avenue (1974 – UK No. 9)
- Play Don't Worry (1975 – UK No. 29)
- Heaven and Hull (1994)
- Just Like This (recorded in 1976, released in 1999)
- Showtime (live in 1976 and 1989, released in 1999)
- Indian Summer (recorded in 1981–2, released in 2001)

==== Singles ====
- "4th Hour of My Sleep" (Tucker Zimmerman) – 3:08/"Power of Darkness" (Ronson, Benny Marshall) – 3:32 (1971) with his band Ronno.
- "Love Me Tender"/"Only After Dark" (1974) – RCA APBO-0212
- "Slaughter on Tenth Avenue"/"Leave My Heart Alone" (1974) – RCA APBO-0291
- "Billy Porter" / "Seven Days" (1974) – RCA 2482
- "Billy Porter" / "Slaughter on Tenth Avenue" (1982) – RCA GOLD 546
- "Don't Look Down" / "Slaughter on Tenth Avenue" / "Billy Porter" / "Love Me Tender" CD single (1994 – UK No. 55) – credited to Mick Ronson with Joe Elliott

=== With Michael Chapman ===
- Fully Qualified Survivor (1970) – guitar

=== With David Bowie ===
- The Man Who Sold the World (1970)
- Hunky Dory (1971)
- The Rise and Fall of Ziggy Stardust and the Spiders from Mars (1972)
- Aladdin Sane (1973)
- Pin Ups (1973)
- Black Tie White Noise (1993) – lead guitar on "I Feel Free"
- Ziggy Stardust: The Motion Picture (1983)
- Bowie at the Beeb (2000)
- Live Santa Monica '72 (2008)

=== With Lou Reed ===
- Transformer (1972) – lead guitar, piano, recorder, string arrangements, production

=== With Pure Prairie League ===
- Bustin' Out (1972) – guitar, background vocals, string arrangements

=== With Mott the Hoople ===
- All the Young Dudes (1972) – strings, brass, arrangement on "Sea Diver"
- "Saturday Gigs" single (1974)

=== With Ian Hunter ===
- Ian Hunter (1975)
- You're Never Alone with a Schizophrenic (1979)
- Welcome to the Club (1980)
- Short Back 'n' Sides (1981)
- YUI Orta (1990)
- BBC Live in Concert (1995)

=== With Ellen Foley ===
- Night Out (1979) – co-producer (with Ian Hunter), guitar, keyboards, percussion, string arrangements, background vocals

=== With Bob Dylan ===
- Hard Rain (1976)
- The Bootleg Series Vol. 5: Bob Dylan Live 1975, The Rolling Thunder Revue (2002)
- Bob Dylan – The Rolling Thunder Revue: The 1975 Live Recordings (2019)

=== With Rich Kids ===
- Ghosts of Princes in Towers (1978) – Producer

=== With Morrissey ===
- Your Arsenal (1992) – Producer

=== With Payolas ===
- No Stranger to Danger (1982)
- Hammer on a Drum (1983)

=== With Dalbello ===
- Whomanfoursays (1984)

=== With Andi Sex Gang ===
- Arco Valley (1988)

=== With Elton John ===
- Tumbleweed Connection (1995 Rocket and 2001 Mercury reissue)

=== With John Mellencamp (as John Cougar) ===
- American Fool (1982)

=== With Roger C. Reale ===
- Reptiles in Motion (1979, released October 2018)

=== With Fatal Flowers ===
- Jonny D. Is Back! (1988) – Producer
- Pleasure Ground (1990) – Producer

=== Others ===
- Ronson also made an album with the Norwegian artist Casino Steel, called Casino Steel and the Bandits, featuring Mick Ronson in 1991.

== In popular culture ==
A 2017 feature-length biographical documentary entitled Beside Bowie: The Mick Ronson Story was directed by Jon Brewer produced by Cardinal Releasing. The film had a limited theatrical release and was later released to DVD.

== Sources ==
- Weird; Gilly (2009). Mick Ronson – The Spider With The Platinum Hair. John Blake Publishing. ISBN 978-1-784-18952-5.
