= Conversations with My Family =

Studio album by Mike Garson
- Released: April 8, 2008
- Studio: Rising Jazz Stars
- Genre: Jazz
- Length: 82:00
- Label: Resonance
- Producer: George Klabin

Mike Garson chronology
Homage to My Heroes (2003)	Conversations with My Family (2008)	Lost in Conversation (2008)

Conversations with My Family is a solo album by pianist Mike Garson that was released by Resonance in 2008. This is the first solo album released commercially by Garson in over fifteen years after having spent the previous decade working with David Bowie, Nine Inch Nails, and Smashing Pumpkins.

Garson is supported by Lori Bell, Chris Howes, Andreas Öberg, Bob Magnusson, and Claudio Roditi. Most of the arrangements are by Kuno Schmid.

== Track listing ==
1. The Child Within 8:01
2. Interlude 0:42
3. Lullaby for our daughters 5:06
4. Interlude 0:29
5. The mystery and the awe 4:35
6. Blues for the terrible twos 5:41
7. Interlude 0:22
8. Longings 6:43
9. Interlude 0:40
10. Trials and revelations 3:57
11. Interlude 0:45
12. Yearnings 4:40
13. Interaction 3:27
14. Interlude 0:37
15. Song for Susan 4:25
16. Interlude 0:28
17. Searching 7:49
18. Interlude 0:27
19. Miracle of love 5:19
20. Interlude 0:19
21. Jenny's waltz 4:03
22. Conversations with my family 4:02

== Bonus DVD ==
1. Autumn leaves/ stella by starlight (medley)
2. In your own sweet way
3. Besame mucho
4. Hello young lovers
