= Oxnard Sessions, Vol.1 =

Oxnard Sessions, Vol. 1

Studio album by Mike Garson
- Released: 1990
- Recorded: 1990
- Genres: Jazz, Classical
- Length: 62:00
- Label: MG&A
- Producer: Mike Garson

Mike Garson chronology
The Mystery Man (1990)	Oxnard Sessions, Vol. 1 (1990)	A Gershwin Fantasia (1998)

Professional ratings
Review scores
Source	Rating
Allmusic	link

Oxnard Sessions, Vol. 1 is the sixth solo album by jazz pianist Mike Garson. It was released in 1990.

== Track listing ==
No.	Title	Writer(s)	Length
1.	"Without Self"	Mike Garson	9:26
2.	"Nothin’ to Do Blues"	M. Garson	5:35
3.	"Tenderly"	Walter Gross, Jack Lawrence	3:49
4.	"Wind Beneath My Wings"	Larry Henley, Jeff Silbar	6:00
5.	"Spontaneity"	Mike Garson, Susan Garson	5:38
6.	"Solar"	Miles Davis	6:32
7.	"Sweet and Lovely"	Gus Arnheim, Jules LeMare, Harry Tobias	7:43
8.	"Oh, Lady Be Good"	George Gershwin, Ira Gershwin	5:46
9.	"Nothin’ to Do Blues (alternate take)"	M. Garson	7:17
10.	"Sweet And Lovely (alternate take)"	Arnheim, LeMare, Tobais	7:13
11.	"Tenderly (alternate take)"	Gross, Lawrence	4:06
12.	"Spontaneity (alternate take)"	M. Garson, S. Garson	6:40
