= Annette Peacock =

American musician (born 1941)

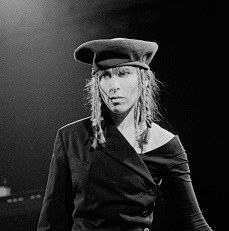

Background information
- Born: 1941 (age 84–85); Brooklyn, New York City, U.S.
- Genres: Free jazz, avant-garde jazz, electronic, art rock
- Occupations: Composer, musician, songwriter, producer, arranger
- Instruments: Vocals, synthesizer, keyboards
- Years active: 1960s–present
- Labels: ironic US, ECM, RCA, Sony, BMG

Annette Peacock (born 1941) is an American composer, musician, songwriter, producer, and arranger. She is a pioneer in electronic music who combined her voice with one of the first Moog synthesizers in the late 1960s.

== Biography ==
Annette Peacock was writing music by the time she was four years old. She is self-taught except for her time as a student at The Juilliard School in the early 1970s. She grew up in California.

She moved to New York to marry jazz bassist Gary Peacock in 1960. During the early 1960s, she was an associate and guest of Timothy Leary and Ram Dass at Millbrook, and was among the first to study Zen Macrobiotics with Michio Kushi, a discipline she continues to uphold. Peacock toured Europe with avant-garde jazz saxophonist Albert Ayler while she was married to Gary Peacock. After their divorce, Peacock married the pianist Paul Bley. Her compositions appeared on Bley's album Ballads and influenced the style of ECM Records. She was a pioneer in synthesizing electronic vocals after having been given a prototype of the first designed Moog synthesizer by its inventor, Robert Moog.

She performed with the Bley-Peacock Synthesizer Show at New York's Town Hall in November 1969 and the next month at Philharmonic Hall which she promoted with late-night television advertisements and an appearance on The Johnny Carson Show. Her official debut solo album, I'm the One (RCA Victor), was released in 1972.

During the 1970s and 1980s, she worked with Karlheinz Stockhausen, Allan Holdsworth, Evan Parker, Brian Eno, Bill Bruford, Mike Garson, Mick Ronson before moving back to the U.S. The album An Acrobat's Heart (ECM, 2000) took two years to compose and arrange, and broke her 12-year hiatus from recording.

== Critical reception ==
"Annette Peacock is a stone cold original – an innovator, an outlier, authentically sui generis," said John Doran of The Quietus.

== Discography ==
=== As leader ===
- 1971 I Belong To A World That's Destroying Itself the authorized Ironic 2014 re-issue of Peacock's first solo album 1971 mis-credited as Bley Peacock Synthesizer Show: Revenge
- 1972 I'm the One (RCA Victor) (reissued in 2010 on ironic US)
- 1978 X-Dreams (Aura Records)
- 1979 The Perfect Release (Aura)
- 1981 Live in Paris released against her wishes (Metronome, LP only)
- 1982 Sky Skating (ironic)
- 1983 Been in the Streets Too Long (ironic)
- 1986 I Have No Feelings (ironic)
- 1988 Abstract-Contact (ironic)
- 2000 An Acrobat's Heart (ECM)
- 2005 31:31 (ironic US)

=== Singles ===
- "Don't Be Cruel" / "Dear Bela" (Aura, 1978)
- "Love's Out to Lunch" / "Rubber Hunger" (Aura, 1979)
- "Sky-skating" / "Taking It as It Comes" (ironic, 1981)

=== Compilations ===
- 1982 The Collection (Aura)
- 2004 My Mama Never Taught Me How to Cook: The Aura Years 1978–1982 (Sanctuary Records)

=== As co-leader or sidewoman ===
- 1971 Revenge: The Bigger The Love The Greater The Hate, Bley-Peacock Synthesizer Show. This is actually her first solo album, preceding I'm The One. Paul Bley is only on three tracks. See 'As leader' above.
- 1971 The Paul Bley Synthesizer Show, Paul Bley (composer only)
- 1971 Improvisie, Paul Bley with Annette and Han Bennink
- 1972 Dual Unity Annette & Paul Bley with Mario Pavone and either Han Bennink or Laurence Cook on drums.
- 1978 Feels Good to Me, Bill Bruford with Allan Holdsworth, Dave Stewart, and Jeff Berlin
- 2006 Sound Mirrors, Coldcut

=== As composer ===
Annette Peacock wrote at least 15 compositions specifically for Paul Bley's repertoire, which he performed/recorded many times through the decades. As well, her compositions have been recorded by Marilyn Crispell, Mick Ronson, Affinity, Andrew Poppy, Bill Bruford, Liam Noble, Howard Riley, Eliana Glass, Al Kooper, BleySchool, Ava Cherry, Morcheeba, Karin Krog, Coldcut, Barry Green, Kazuo Imai, Nels Cline, Mary Halvorson, Ethan Iverson, Frank Kimbrough, David Gilmore, Marc Copland, Mario Pavone, and others.

== Compositions appeared on ==
- 1965: Paul Bley Trio - Touching ("Touching", "Both" & "Cartoon")
- 1966: Paul Bley Trio - Closer ("Cartoon")
- 1967: Paul Bley - Ramblin' ("Both", "Albert's Love Theme" & "Touching")
- 1967: Paul Bley, Gary Peacock, Barry Altschul - Virtuosi (all compositions: "Butterflies" & "Gary")
- 1968: Paul Bley - Mr. Joy (all compositions: "Kid Dynamite", "Nothing Ever Was, Anyway", "El Cordobes", "Touching", "Blood" & "Mr. Joy")
- 1968: Paul Bley - Turning Point ("Mr. Joy" & "Kid Dynamite")
- 1968: Karin Krog and Friends - Joy ("Mr. Joy")
- 1970: Paul Bley & Gary Peacock - Paul Bley with Gary Peacock (all compositions: "Gary" & "Albert's Love Theme")
- 1971: Paul Bley - The Paul Bley Synthesizer Show (all compositions:"Mr. Joy", "The Archangel", "Nothing Ever Was, Anyway", "Gary", "Snakes", "Parks" & "Circles")
- 1971: Paul Bley - Ballads (all compositions:"Ending", "Circles" & "So Hard It Hurts")
- 1972: Paul Bley - Open, to Love ("Open, to Love" & "Nothing Ever Was, Anyway")
- 1973: Al Kooper - Naked Songs ("Been and Gone")
- 1973: Paul Bley & Niels-Henning Ørsted Pedersen - Paul Bley/NHØP ("Gesture Without Plot")
- 1974: Mick Ronson - Slaughter on 10th Avenue ("I'm the One") & (7 Days)
- 1974: Paul Bley & Jaco Pastorius - Jaco ("Blood")
- 1975: Paul Bley – Alone, Again ("Dreams")
- 1978: Bill Bruford - Feels Good to Me ("Adios A La Pasada (Goodbye to the Past)")
- 1986: Paul Bley - Fragments ("Nothing Ever Was, Anyway")
- 1992: Paul Bley, Franz Koglmann, Gary Peacock - Annette ("Touching" (2 takes), "El Cordobes", "Cartoon", "Albert's Love Theme", "Kid Dynamite", "Miracles", "Blood (2 takes), "Both", "Mister Joy")
- 1996: Marilyn Crispell, Gary Peacock & Paul Motian - Nothing Ever Was, Anyway: Music of Annette Peacock (all compositions: "Nothing Ever Was, Anyway", "Butterflies That I Feel Inside Me", "Open, to Love", "Cartoon", "Albert's Love Theme", "Dreams (If Time Weren't)", "Touching", "Both", "You've Left Me", "Miracles", "Ending" & "Blood")
- 2006: Coldcut - "Just For The Kick" ft. Annette Peacock
- 2014: Eric Plandé, Uwe Oberg, Peter Perfido - Touching ("Touching")
- 2015: Uwe Oberg - Twice, At Least ("Touching")
- 2015; Mary Halvorson - Meltframe ("Blood")
- 2016: Nels Cline - Lovers medley of ("So Hard It Hurts/Touching") arranged by Michael Leonhart
- 2016: Frank Kimbrough - Solstice ("Albert's Love Theme" & "El Cordobes")
- 2016: Uwe Oberg & Silke Eberhard - Turns ("Both", "Mr. Joy")
- 2025: Eliana Glass - E ("Dreams")
