= Slaughter on Tenth Avenue =

1936 ballet by George Balanchine

Slaughter on Tenth Avenue is a ballet with music by Richard Rodgers and choreography by George Balanchine. It occurs near the end of Rodgers and Hart's 1936 Broadway musical comedy On Your Toes. Slaughter is the story of a hoofer who falls in love with a dance hall girl who is then shot and killed by her jealous boyfriend. The hoofer then shoots the boyfriend.

The ballet is integrated into the plot of the musical by the device of having two gangsters watching it from box seats in the theatre in which it is staged. They have orders to shoot the leading dancer (played by Ray Bolger in the original production). The dancer, who has been warned just in time, evades them by suddenly dancing at full speed even after the ballet actually ends, and finally two police officers enter and arrest the gangsters.

Slaughter on Tenth Avenue was danced by Bolger and Tamara Geva in the original stage production of On Your Toes, and by Eddie Albert and Vera Zorina in the film version. In Words and Music, the 1948 Technicolor film biography of Rodgers and Hart, the ballet was danced by Gene Kelly and Vera-Ellen, with a somewhat revised, more tragic storyline, and new choreography by Kelly (in Kelly's version, the boyfriend, in addition to killing the dance hall girl, also kills the hoofer).

The first television performance of "Slaughter" was on NBC-TV's Garroway at Large program in 1950 or 1951, with the NBC Chicago studio orchestra under the direction of Joseph Gallichio.

Slaughter on Tenth Avenue entered the repertoire of the New York City Ballet in 1968, first danced by Suzanne Farrell and Arthur Mitchell.

== Adaptations ==
=== Music ===
Lew Stone conducted the BBC Dance Orchestra in a 1936 BBC broadcast performance of Rodgers' score which was the work's radio premiere.

Theatre organist George Wright recorded the composition for his second album for HiFiRecords, George Wright Encores.

An arrangement of Rodgers's theme is part of the soundtrack of the 1957 crime thriller Slaughter on Tenth Avenue, which borrows the title but is otherwise unrelated to the 1936 stage play.

Buddy Cole recorded a version with the Monty Kelly Orchestra shortly before his death in 1964.

Jimmy Smith the jazz organist performed an Oliver Nelson arrangement on the album Who's Afraid of Virginia Woolf (1964)

Jazz singer Anita O'Day performed a vocal (scat) version on her Verve album Incomparable.

The Ventures recorded an instrumental rock version of "Slaughter on Tenth Avenue", based on the score of the ballet. It was released as a single in 1964, and appeared on their album Knock Me Out the following year. The single became a minor hit in the United States, peaking at #35 on the Billboard Hot 100 charts.

The British instrumental pop group The Shadows released their version in November 1969 (b/w "Midnight Cowboy" (John Barry) Columbia DB8628).

Electronic Realizations For Rock Orchestra, the first album released by synthesizer pioneer Larry Fast under the project name of Synergy, featured an electronic rendition of the ballet.

James Last recorded the ballet on his 1975 album Well Kept Secret, featuring Larry Carlton on lead guitar.

Mick Ronson chose the ballet as title track to his debut solo recording Slaughter on 10th Avenue. Ronson was lead guitarist of David Bowie's legendary band, "The Spiders From Mars" and knew and liked the music from his childhood piano training. He continued to play the song the rest of his career.

Don Walker's arrangement was performed by the John Wilson Orchestra as part of the 2012 BBC Proms

The story was parodied by Morecambe and Wise as Slaughter on Western Avenue.
