= Slaughter on 10th Avenue (Mick Ronson album) =

Studio album by Mick Ronson
- Released: February 1974
- Recorded: July 1973
- Studio: Château d'Hérouville, Hérouville, France; Trident, London
- Genre: Rock, glam rock
- Length: 35:19
- Label: RCA
- Producer: Mick Ronson

Mick Ronson chronology
Slaughter on 10th Avenue (1974)	Play Don't Worry (1975)

Singles from Slaughter on 10th Avenue
- 1. "Love Me Tender" Released: 1974; 2. "Slaughter on Tenth Avenue" Released: 1974

Slaughter on 10th Avenue is the debut album by English guitarist Mick Ronson, then-guitarist of David Bowie's backing band the Spiders from Mars. It was released in February 1974 by RCA Records.

For inspiration, Ronson relied on Annette Peacock's 1972 album I'm the One; he used the title track and her arrangement of Elvis Presley's "Love Me Tender". Two songs were co-written by Ronson with Scott Richardson, who had been involved in the Ann Arbor music scene since the mid-'60s and came to prominence as lead singer of the SRC. Richardson was brought into the Bowie camp by Angie Bowie, who met him through Ron Asheton of the Stooges. During the recording of the album, Ronson considered putting together a new band with Richardson, Aynsley Dunbar, and Trevor Bolder, to be called the Fallen Angels, but plans fell through.

"Only After Dark", one of the two tracks co-written by Ronson and Richardson, was later covered by the original lineup of the Human League in 1980. Their version was intended as the second single from their second album Travelogue, but their label Virgin Records shelved it in favour of a reissue of the track "Empire State Human" (from their first album) and the pressings of "Only After Dark" were given away as a free bonus single with the official single, a move that greatly angered the group, and contributed to their subsequent split.

The song was also covered by British heavy rock band Def Leppard, and was issued as the B-side of their 1992 hit single "Let's Get Rocked".

== Promotion and live shows ==
Mick Ronson's debut concert came at the Rainbow Theatre, London, with a pair of shows on 22–23 February 1974. His band consisted of Mark Carr-Pritchard on second guitar, Trevor Bolder on bass, Mike Garson on keyboards and Ritchie Dharma on drums. The band were augmented by Thunderthighs on vocals, a five-piece horn section and the London Symphony Orchestra. This was followed by a 13 date tour in April 1974 without the orchestra.

== Reception ==
Professional ratings
Review scores
Source	Rating
AllMusic	4.5/5 stars
Classic Rock	7/10 stars
Mojo	3/5 stars

Dave Thompson of AllMusic praised the album, putting it on par with "any of Bowie's own" and describing it as a "snapshot of a special time, when the triple disciplines of glam, rock, and 'Precious Art' slammed into one another." According to journalist Jim Irvin, "Ronno's best-selling solo set of '74 has exclusive Bowie songs, a cracking band and engaging ideas. But the mixes are odd, some tracks don't lift-off and his vocals lack a distinctive persona." Classic Rock reviewer finds the album "a mixed blessing" too. Some songs sound dated and overblown, but Bowie's penned tracks are "slices of old-school camp given a no-nonsense twist."

== Track listing ==
All credits adapted from the original liner notes.

Side 1
No.	Title	Length
1.	"Love Me Tender" (George R. Poulton, Ken Darby)	4:50
2.	"Growing Up and I'm Fine" (David Bowie)	3:10
3.	"Only After Dark" (Mick Ronson, Scott Richardson)	3:30
4.	"Music Is Lethal" (Lucio Battisti, English lyrics by Bowie)	5:10

Side 2
No.	Title	Length
5.	"I'm the One" (Annette Peacock)	5:03
6.	"Pleasure Man / Hey Ma Get Papa" (Ronson, Richardson, Bowie)	8:55
7.	"Slaughter on Tenth Avenue" (Richard Rodgers)	4:41

Bonus tracks on selected CD editions
No.	Title	Length
8.	"Solo on 10th Avenue (Solo guitar sections)" (Richard Rodgers)	2:07
9.	"Leave My Heart Alone (Live 22–23 February 1974 at the Rainbow Theatre)" (Craig Fuller)	4:32
10.	"Love Me Tender (Live 22–23 February 1974 at the Rainbow Theatre)"	4:43
11.	"Slaughter on Tenth Avenue (Live 22–23 February 1974 at the Rainbow Theatre)"	4:35

=== Charts ===
Chart (1974)	Peak position
Australia (Kent Music Report)	63
United Kingdom (Official Charts Company)	9

== Personnel ==
- Mick Ronson – guitar, piano, vocals, arrangement, conductor
- Trevor Bolder – bass, trumpet, trombone
- Aynsley Dunbar – drums, percussion
- Mike Garson – piano, electric piano, organ
- David Hentschel – ARP on "Hey Ma Get Papa"
- Margaret Ronson – backing vocals
- Dennis MacKay – engineer, backing vocals
- Sidney Sax – strings
- Leee Black Childers – cover
