= Remember Love (Mike Garson album) =

Studio album by Mike Garson
- Released: 1989
- Genre: Classical Jazz
- Length: 40:48
- Label: MG&A
- Producer: Stanley Clarke

Mike Garson chronology
Serendipity (1986)	Remember Love (1989)	Oxnard Sessions, Vol.1 (1990)

Professional ratings
Review scores
Source	Rating
Allmusic	link

Remember Love is the fourth solo album by jazz pianist Mike Garson, and was released in 1989.

== Track listing ==
All tracks are written by Mike Garson, except where noted.

No.	Title	Writer(s)	Length
1.	"Come into My Arms"		3:03
2.	"Man in the Mirror"	Glen Ballard, Siedah Garrett	4:13
3.	"Remember Love"		4:24
4.	"Somewhere Out There"	James Horner, Barry Mann, Cynthia Weil	5:26
5.	"Mardi Gras"		2:58
6.	"Blue Light"		3:33
7.	"Double Funk"		3:03
8.	"Age of God"		6:01
9.	"Yesterdays"	Otto Harbach, Jerome Kern	2:27
10.	"Interaction"		3:01
11.	"Meditative Improv"		2:39
