= Overnight Angels =

Studio album by Ian Hunter
- Released: May 1977
- Studio: Le Studio, Morin-Heights, Canada; Utopia, London; Olympic, London
- Genre: Hard rock
- Length: 37:33
- Label: Columbia
- Producer: Roy Thomas Baker

Ian Hunter chronology
| All American Alien Boy (1976) | Overnight Angels (1977) | You're Never Alone with a Schizophrenic (1979) |

Professional ratings
Review scores
| Source | Rating |
|---|---|
| AllMusic | 1.5/5 stars |

Overnight Angels is the third studio album by Ian Hunter, released in May 1977 by Columbia Records.

After the poor sales of his previous album, Hunter's apparent aim for this record was to re-emphasise faster songs with more of a rock feel, and he recruited the well-regarded Roy Thomas Baker to produce. However, the album received mixed reviews, and Columbia Records refused to release it in the US, according to Hunter because he had just fired his manager. Columbia reportedly told Hunter they would release it once he had a manager and tour in place to support the album. The release didn't occur however as Hunter left the label but the album did become available as an import when Hunter's next album became a minor hit. Hunter later disavowed the album and described it as a "mistake".

Columbia eventually released five of the songs ("England Rocks", "Wild 'N Free", "Justice of the Peace", "Overnight Angels" and "Golden Opportunity") in the U.S. on the 1979 compilation album Shades of Ian Hunter: The Ballad of Ian Hunter and Mott the Hoople.

Hunter later went on record as stating he disliked the album because he felt the album was forced and, in particular, his vocals which he felt he sang in too high a register. Also, part of the recording studio he was working in burned down during the album sessions. He toured the album with Earl Slick on lead guitar, Rob Rawlinson on bass, Peter Oxendale on keyboards and William "Curly" Smith on drums. The Vibrators were the support band.

The song "England Rocks" (originally a non-album B-side) would become one of his best-known songs, retitled "Cleveland Rocks" on Hunter's next tour, and re-recorded with the new title for his next album.

Joe Elliott's Down 'n' Outz covered the songs "Golden Opportunity", "Overnight Angels" and "England Rocks" on their 2010 album My ReGeneration. The album was re-released on CD by Rock Candy Records in September 2022

== Track listing ==
All songs written by Ian Hunter except where noted

1. "Golden Opportunity" – 4:31
2. "Shallow Crystals" – 3:58
3. "Overnight Angels" – 5:12
4. "Broadway" – 3:46
5. "Justice of the Peace" – 3:01
6. "(Miss) Silver Dime" (Hunter, Earl Slick) – 4:34
7. "Wild 'N Free" – 3:08
8. "The Ballad of Little Star" – 2:32
9. "To Love a Woman" – 3:54
10. "England Rocks" – 2:53 (bonus track on remastered CD)

== Personnel ==
- Ian Hunter - lead and harmony vocals, rhythm guitar, piano
- Earl Slick - lead, rhythm and slide guitars
- Peter Oxendale - keyboards
- Rob Rawlinson - bass, harmony vocals
- Dennis Elliott - drums
- Miller Anderson - harmony vocals (4)
- Lem Lubin - harmony vocals (4)
- Roy Thomas Baker - percussion

Technical

- Gary Lyons - engineer
- Mastered by George Marino at Sterling Sound, NYC
- John Berg, Roslav Szaybo - cover design
- David Oxtoby - front cover art

== Charts ==
| Chart (1977) | Peak position |
|---|---|
| Australian Albums (Kent Music Report) | 38 |
| Swedish Albums (Sverigetopplistan) | 28 |
