= My ReGeneration =

Studio album by Joe Elliott's Down 'n' Outz
- Released: 13 July 2010
- Recorded: 2009–10
- Studio: Moor Hall Studio, Bedfordshire; Joe's Garage
- Genre: Glam rock, hard rock
- Length: 48:36
- Label: Mailboat Records
- Producer: Joe Elliott, Ronan McHugh

Professional ratings
Review scores
Source	Rating
Allmusic	4/5 stars
Rolling Stone	3.5/5 stars

My ReGeneration is the debut album by Joe Elliott's Down 'n' Outz, the band featuring members of Def Leppard, The Quireboys and Raw Glory. The album features covers of songs by artists related to Mott the Hoople, such as Mott, British Lions and Ian Hunter. A ten-track version of the album was available with the 23 June 2010 edition of Classic Rock magazine, prior to the full album's release on 13 July of the same year.

== Track listing ==
Full album, released 13 July 2010
No.	Title	Writer(s)	Original album	Length
1.	"Golden Opportunity" (Ian Hunter cover)	Ian Hunter	Overnight Angels	4:34
2.	"Storm" (Mott cover)	Pete Watts, Morgan Fisher, Ray Major	Shouting and Pointing	5:55
3.	"Overnight Angels" (Ian Hunter cover)	Hunter	Overnight Angels	5:07
4.	"Career (No Such Thing As Rock 'n' Roll)" (Mott cover)	Fisher, Nigel Benjamin	Shouting and Pointing	5:15
5.	"England Rocks" (Ian Hunter cover)	Hunter	Overnight Angels	2:50
6.	"Shouting and Pointing" (Mott cover)	Watts, Fisher	Shouting and Pointing	4:31
7.	"By Tonight" (Mott cover)	Watts	Drive On	3:42
8.	"Apologies" (Mott cover)	Major	Drive On	1:02
9.	"Who Do You Love" (Ian Hunter cover)	Hunter	Ian Hunter	3:51
10.	"One More Chance to Run" (British Lions cover)	John Fiddler	British Lions	3:41
11.	"3000 Miles from Here" (Ian Hunter cover)	Hunter	Ian Hunter	2:37
12.	"Good Times" (The Easybeats cover)	Harry Vanda, George Young	Shouting and Pointing	3:54
13.	"The Flipside of the Shameless Whelk"	Joe Elliott, Ronan McHugh	—	1:37

10-track edition, available with Classic Rock magazine 23 June 2010
No.	Title	Writer(s)	Length
1.	"Golden Opportunity"	Ian Hunter	4:34
2.	"Storm"	Pete Watts, Morgan Fisher, Ray Major	5:55
3.	"Overnight Angels"	Hunter	5:07
4.	"Career (No Such Thing As Rock 'n' Roll)"	Fisher, Nigel Benjamin	5:15
5.	"England Rocks"	Hunter	2:50
6.	"Shouting and Pointing"	Watts, Fisher	4:31
7.	"By Tonight"	Watts	3:42
8.	"Who Do You Love"	Hunter	3:51
9.	"One More Chance to Run"	John Fiddler	3:41
10.	"Good Times"	Harry Vanda, George Young	3:54

== Personnel ==
Musicians

- Joe Elliott — lead vocals, backing vocals, rhythm guitar, acoustic guitar, piano, percussion
- Paul Guerin — lead and rhythm guitar, backing vocals
- Guy Griffin — rhythm guitar, backing vocals
- Keith Weir — keyboards, backing vocals
- Ronnie Garrity — bass guitar
- Phil Martin — drums, backing vocals

Production

- Joe Elliott — producer
- Ronan McHugh — co-producer, engineering, mixing, editing, mastering
- Chris Corney — engineering

Other

- Paul Steadman — band photography
- Delme Beddow — additional photography
- Kristine Elliott — creative consultant
