= Carol Channing in film and television =

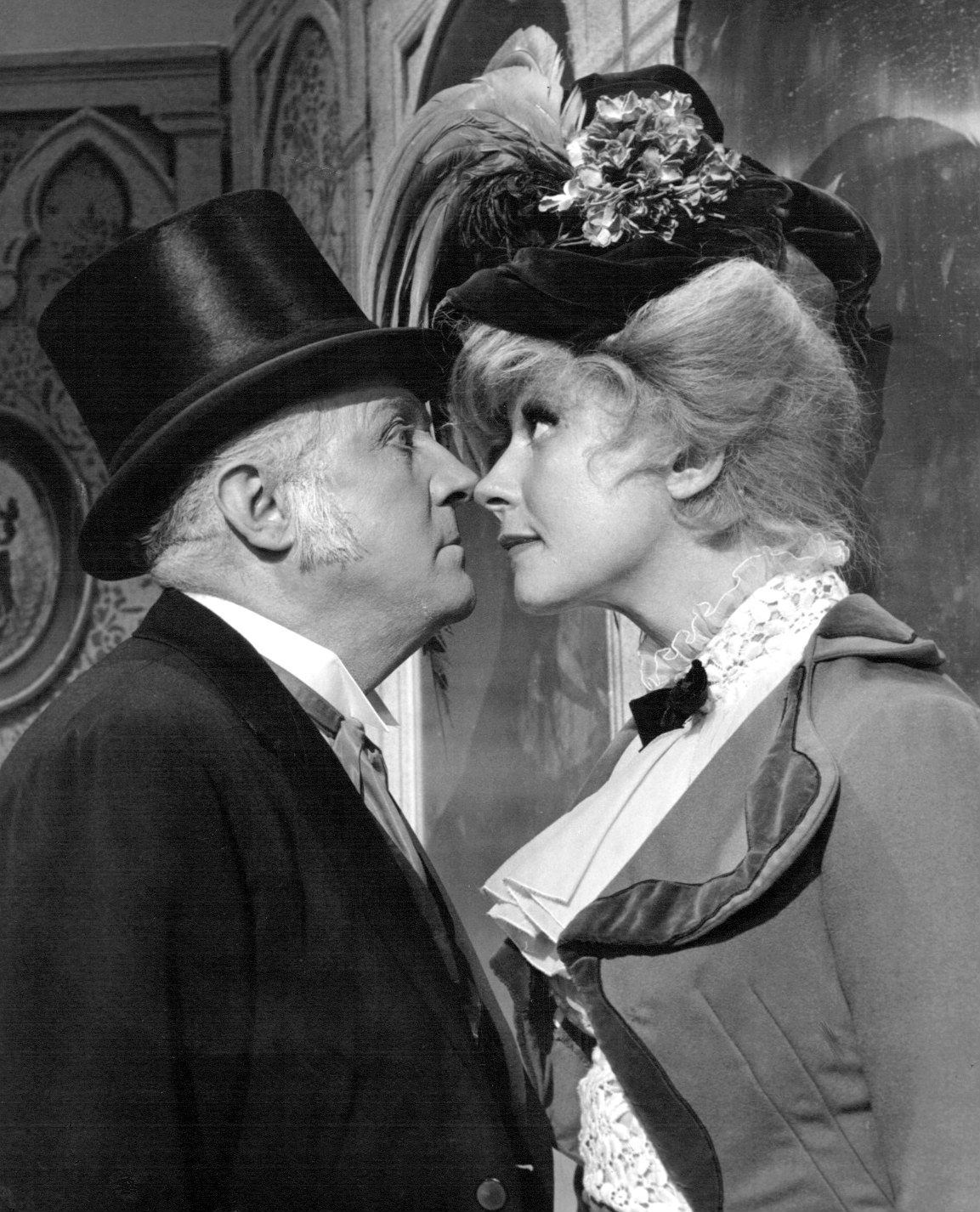
Carol Channing and Milo Boulton in Hello Dolly, 1966

Carol Channing (January 31, 1921 – January 15, 2019) was an American actress, singer, dancer, comedian, and voice artist. She won the Golden Globe Award and was nominated for the Academy Award for Best Supporting Actress for her performance as Muzzy Van Hossmere in Thoroughly Modern Millie (1967). Other film appearances include The First Traveling Saleslady (1956) and Skidoo (1968). On television she has made many appearances as an entertainer on variety shows, from The Ed Sullivan Show in the 1950s to Hollywood Squares. She is also known for her performance as The White Queen in a 1985 production of Alice in Wonderland.

On television, Channing appeared on numerous television shows beginning in the early 1950s. Her husband at the time produced the Burns and Allen comedy show, which starred George Burns and Gracie Allen. When Allen was forced to discontinue performing due to medical problems, Lowe asked Channing to take over Allen's role. Since the late 1950s she worked on and off with Burns, who appeared with her in 1966 on the TV special, An Evening with Carol Channing.

She had guest appearances on sitcoms and talk shows, including What's My Line?, where she appeared in 11 episodes from 1962 to 1966. Channing did voice-over work in cartoons, most notably as Grandmama in an animated version of The Addams Family from 1992 to 1995. On Sesame Street in 1986 she sang a parody of the song "Hello, Dolly!" called "Hello, Sammy!", as a love song to Sammy the Snake. In 1993, she poked a little fun at herself in an episode of The Nanny.

== Filmography ==
=== Film ===
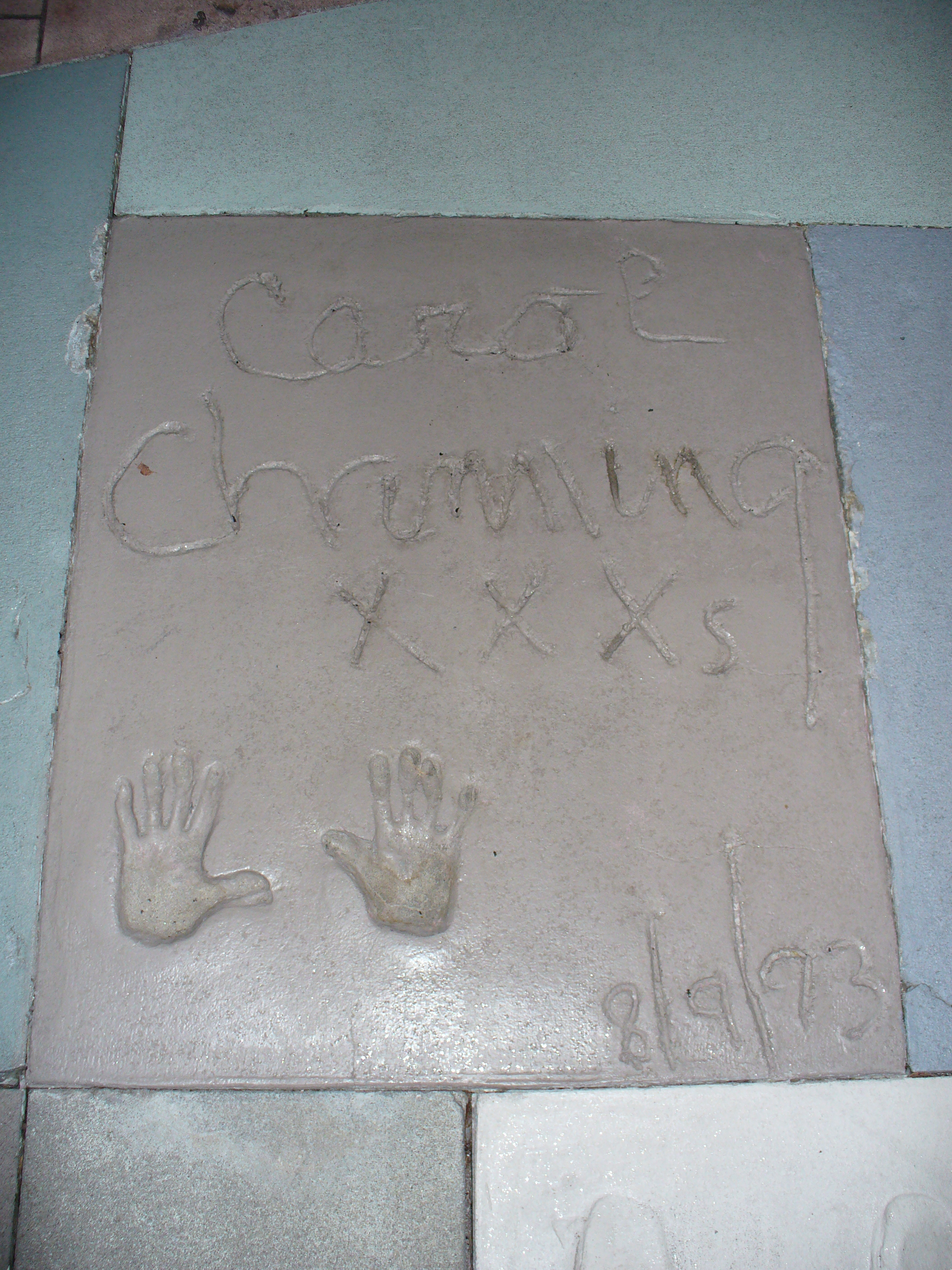
The handprints of Carol Channing in front of The Great Movie Ride at Disney's Hollywood Studios at the Walt Disney World Resort.

Year	Title	Role	Notes
1950	Paid in Full	Mrs. Peters	Uncredited, Paramount
1956	The First Traveling Saleslady	Molly Wade	
1967	All About People	The Narrator	Short film
1967	Thoroughly Modern Millie	Muzzy Van Hossmere	Golden Globe Award for Best Supporting Actress; Nominated – Academy Award for Best Supporting Actress
1968	Skidoo	Flo Banks	
1970	Shinbone Alley	Mehitabel	Voice role, Fine Art Studios
1978	Sgt. Pepper's Lonely Hearts Club Band	Guest at Heartland	Cameo
1989	Happily Ever After	Muddy	Voice role, Filmation
1994	Thumbelina	Ms. Fieldmouse	Voice role, Don Bluth
1998	Homo Heights	Herself	
1998	The Brave Little Toaster Goes to Mars	Fanny	Voice role; final performance in a non-documentary, Disney
2003	Broadway: The Golden Age, by the Legends Who Were There	Herself	
2011	Carol Channing: Larger Than Life	Herself	Documentary

=== Television ===
Year	Series	Role	Notes
1957	The Red Skelton Show, Starring Red Skelton	Daisy June	2 episodes
1962–1966	What's My Line?	Herself	11 episodes
1958	The Ford Show, Starring Tennessee Ernie Ford	Herself	2 episodes
1966	The Carol Channing Show	Carol Honeycutt	Unsold pilot for Desilu Studios
1968–1972	The Carol Burnett Show	Herself	3 episodes
1969–1972	Rowan & Martin's Laugh-In	Herself	8 episodes
1971	The Flip Wilson Show	Herself	1 episode
1980	The Muppet Show	Herself	1 episode
1981–1987	The Love Boat	Varying roles	7 episodes
1983	Magnum, P.I.	Herself	1 episode "Distant Relative" (cameo)
1983	Parade of Stars	Lorelei Lee	Television film
1985	Alice in Wonderland	White Queen	Two-part television film
1986–1988	Sesame Street	Herself	2 episodes
1990	Chip 'n Dale Rescue Rangers	Canina LaFur	2 episodes (voice role)
1991	Where's Wally?	Varying roles	13 episodes (voice role)
1992–1993	The Addams Family	Grandmama Addams	15 episodes (voice role)
1993	The Nanny	Herself	1 episode
1994	The Magic School Bus	Cornelia C. Contralto II	1 episode (voice role)
1994	Burke's Law	Daphne LeMay	1 episode
1995	Space Ghost Coast to Coast	Herself	1 episode
1997	The Drew Carey Show	Herself	Episode: "New York and Queens"
1998	Style & Substance	Herself	1 episode
2006	Family Guy	Herself	Episode: "Patriot Games" (voice role)
2006	Kathy Griffin: My Life on the D-List	Herself	1 episode
2016	RuPaul's Drag Race	Herself	1 episode

== Discography ==
=== Cast recordings and soundtracks ===
- Gentlemen Prefer Blondes, Columbia Records, 1950
- archy and mehitabel: a back-alley opera (with Eddie Bracken), Columbia, 1954
- Show Girl, Roulette Records, 1961
- Hello, Dolly!, RCA Records, 1964
- Thoroughly Modern Millie, Decca Records, 1967
- Lorelei, Decca, 1974
- Hello, Dolly! revival, Varèse Sarabande, 1994

=== Studio albums and live recordings ===
- Carol Channing, Vanguard Records, 1961
- Carol Channing Entertains, Command Records, 1965
- C and W (with Webb Pierce), Plantation Records, 1976
- Kidding Around with Carol Channing and the Kids, Caedmon, 1976
- Carol Channing and Her Country Friends (with Jimmy C. Newman, Hank Locklin, and others), Plantation Records, 1977
- Carol Channing on Tour, 51 West Records, 1980
- Jazz Baby, DRG Records. 1994
- For Heaven's Sake, New Day Records, 2010
- True to the Red, White, and Blue, Homesick Entertainment, 2012

=== Spoken word and audiobooks ===
- Madeline and Other Bemelmans told by Carol Channing, Caedmon Records, 1959
- Gentlemen Prefer Blondes (Lorelei's Diary), Caedmon, 1962
- Carol Channing reads and sings: Roland the Minstrel Pig; Loudmouse; Tom, Sue, and the Clock; The "B" Book, Caedmon, 1969
- The Year Without a Santa Claus read by Carol Channing, Caedmon, 1969
- Carol Channing reads Madeline and the Gypsies, Caedmon, 1970
- Winnie-The-Pooh told and sung by Carol Channing, Caedmon, 1972
- Peter and the Wolf and Tubby the Tuba, Caedmon, 1979
- Carol Channing reads The Purple Cow, Caedmon, 1981
- The House at Pooh Corner told and sung by Carol Channing, Caedmon, 1981
- Carol Channing Sings the Pooh Song Book, Caedmon, 1983
- Winnie-the-Pooh and Christopher Robin told and sung by Carol Channing, Caedmon, 1984
- Just Lucky, I Guess: A Memoir of Sorts, 2017
