= Ian Hunter (album) =

Studio album by Ian Hunter
- Released: 28 March 1975
- Recorded: January–March 1975
- Studios: AIR, London
- Genres: Rock; hard rock; power pop
- Length: 40:38
- Label: CBS
- Producers: Ian Hunter, Mick Ronson

Ian Hunter chronology
Ian Hunter (1975)	All American Alien Boy (1976)

Professional ratings
Review scores
Source	Rating
AllMusic	4/5 stars
Christgau's Record Guide	B
The Village Voice	B−

Ian Hunter is the first solo studio album by English singer-songwriter Ian Hunter, recorded following his departure from Mott the Hoople. Released in 1975, it is also the first of many solo albums on which he collaborated with Mick Ronson. The bassist, Geoff Appleby, was from Hull like Mick Ronson, and they had played together in The Rats in the late 1960s. The track "It Ain't Easy When You Fall/Shades Off" contains the only recorded example of Hunter reading his own poetry.

The single "Once Bitten, Twice Shy" would be his first and last Top 20 hit in the UK Singles Chart. The pop-metal band Great White later covered the song on their 1989 album ...Twice Shy.

"Who Do You Love" and "3,000 Miles from Here" were covered by Joe Elliott's Down 'n' Outz on their 2010 album My ReGeneration. Also, Def Leppard covered "Who Do You Love" on their 1999 single "Goodbye" as a B-side. "Who Do You Love" was also covered by the Pointer Sisters on their 1979 album, Priority.

== Track listing ==
All songs written by Ian Hunter except where noted.

1. "Once Bitten, Twice Shy" – 4:44
2. "Who Do You Love" – 3:51
3. "Lounge Lizard" – 4:32
4. "Boy" (Hunter, Mick Ronson) – 8:52
5. "3,000 Miles from Here" – 2:48
6. "The Truth, the Whole Truth, Nuthin' but the Truth" – 6:13
7. "It Ain't Easy When You Fall/Shades Off" – 5:46
8. "I Get So Excited" – 3:48

=== 30th anniversary bonus tracks ===
9. "Colwater High" – 3:12
10. "One Fine Day" – 2:21
11. "Once Bitten Twice Shy" (single version) – 3:52
12. "Who Do You Love" (single version) – 3:17
13. "Shades Off" (poem) – 1:37
14. "Boy" (single version) – 6:25

== Personnel ==
- Ian Hunter – vocals, rhythm guitar, piano, percussion, backing vocals
- Mick Ronson – lead guitar, organ, Mellotron, mouth organ, bass guitar
- Geoff Appleby – bass guitar, backing vocals
- Dennis Elliott – drums, percussion
- Pete Arnesen – piano, keyboards
- John Gustafson – bass guitar on "Lounge Lizard"

Technical

- Bill Price – engineer
- Roslav Szaybo – design concept
- Martin Springett – illustration

== Charts ==
Chart (1975)	Peak position
Australian Albums (Kent Music Report)	36
Canada Top Albums/CDs (RPM)	83
UK Albums (Official Charts)	21
US Billboard 200	50
