= Cleveland Rocks! Music from The Drew Carey Show =

Soundtrack album by Various artists
- Released: May 19, 1998
- Length: 53:34
- Label: Rhino
- Producer: Gary Stewart

Cleveland Rocks! Music from The Drew Carey Show is a soundtrack for the ABC television series The Drew Carey Show, released on May 19, 1998, by Rhino Records. The album has 24 songs that appeared on the show, both established rock and roll songs and new material performed by the cast of the Drew Carey Show. A new composition titled "Bite Me, Doughboy!" was created for the album by the show's music composer W. G. Snuffy Walden.

Cleveland Rocks! Music from The Drew Carey Show received mostly positive reviews from music critics, who thought the album was perfect for fans of the show. The album won Best New Material Record Release at the 12th TV Theme Music Awards.

== Background and production ==
The Drew Carey Show premiered in 1995 and soon become known for its elaborate song and dance numbers, which were developed in a bid to increase ratings. On April 27, 1998, a reporter for MTV.com announced that an album featuring several of the songs used in the show would be released the following month. The album consists of 24 tracks by artists such as Joe Walsh, Little Richard and Iggy Pop, as well as songs sung by Drew Carey. Songs incorporated into the episodes "New York and Queens" and "The Dog and Pony Show" are present on the album, while two versions of "Cleveland Rocks" are included, one by the original artist, Ian Hunter, and the other by The Presidents of the United States of America, which was used as the show's theme tune from 1997 to 2004. The other two theme tunes "Moon Over Parma" and "Five O'Clock World" are also on the album.

"Bite Me, Doughboy!" is an original composition for the album by the show's music composer W. G. Snuffy Walden. The track uses snippets of music used in the show between scenes. As the snippets were only ten seconds long, Walden decided to incorporate them into a new piece with the help of the cast. "Bite Me, Doughboy!" was recorded at the Taylor Made Studio in Woodland Hills. Cleveland Rocks! Music from The Drew Carey Show was released by Rhino Records on May 19, 1998.

== Reception ==
Cleveland Rocks! Music from The Drew Carey Show won the Best New Material Record Release accolade at the 12th TV Theme Music Awards in 1998.

Lori Sears from The Baltimore Sun gave the album three stars and commented that "fans of the show will get a kick out of this one". Sears thought the tracks performed by the cast were "priceless" and called Carey's version of "High Hopes" a "meek rendition". AllMusic's Stephen Thomas Erlewine also gave the album three stars and said, "In short, it's almost everything a Drew Carey fan could want (even though a version of "A Taste of Honey" would have been nice), and it certainly evokes the nutty charm of the show." Dan Goldwasser of Soundtrack.net wrote that fans of the show would enjoy the album and that it was "worth picking up".

Daniel Buckley of The Tucson Citizen graded the album a B. He liked the tracks used for the show's song and dance numbers, but disliked the clips from the show itself with the cast, such as "High Hopes" and "Tomorrow". Buckley dubbed the album "a dream come true" for fans of the show, but added that general music lovers would also enjoy it. Nicole E. Rogers, writing for The Wisconsin State Journal, thought the album was better than some of the other TV soundtracks released around the same time, as the music was actually relevant to the show. While commenting on The Drew Carey Show, Theresa Carpine Ferris from The Spokesman-Review quipped, "All of the music on this show was so great, an album was made. It's not the same, however, without seeing the antics that accompanied the music on the TV series."

== Track listing ==
No.	Title	Artist	Length
1.	"Cleveland Rocks"	The Presidents of the United States of America	2:32
2.	"Moon Over Parma (Main Title)"	Drew Carey	0:18
3.	"Five O'Clock World"	The Vogues	2:07
4.	"High Hopes"	Drew Carey	0:35
5.	"What is Hip?"	Tower of Power	3:25
6.	"Kira ("Mandy")"	Drew Carey	0:36
7.	"The Time Warp"	The Rocky Horror Picture Show	3:17
8.	"Shake Your Groove Thing"	Peaches & Herb	3:32
9.	"God Bless America"	Drew Carey	0:32
10.	"You Ain't Seen Nothing Yet"	Bachman–Turner Overdrive	3:54
11.	"Free Ride"	The Edger Winter Group	3:02
12.	"Rocky Mountain Way"	Joe Walsh and Little Richard	3:26
13.	"Working in the Coal Mine"	Winfred-Louder Staff	0:24
14.	"Working in the Coal Mine"	Lee Dorsey	2:51
15.	"A Taste of Honey (Rehearsal)"	The Horndogs	1:15
16.	"Now, Right Now"	The Reverend Horton Heat	2:38
17.	"Christmas Parodies"	Mimi & Boys Choir	1:24
18.	"A Man and a Woman (Un homme et une femme)"	Francis Lai	2:42
19.	"40 Cubic Feet"	Drew Carey Orchestra & Vocalists	0:44
20.	"Lust for Life"	Iggy Pop	5:10
21.	"Tomorrow"	Winfred-Louder Staff	0:59
22.	"Bite Me, Doughboy!"	W. G. Snuffy Walden	2:46
23.	"Moon Over Parma (Long version)"	Drew Carey	1:38
24.	"Cleveland Rocks"	Ian Hunter	3:47
