= Shrunken Heads =

Shrunken Heads may refer to:

- Shrunken Heads (film), a 1994 film directed by Richard Elfman
- Shrunken Heads (album), a 2007 album by Ian Hunter
