= All of the Good Ones Are Taken =

Studio album by Ian Hunter
- Released: 1983
- Recorded: Winter 1982–83
- Studios: Wizard Sound, New York
- Genre: Rock
- Length: 42:03
- Label: Columbia
- Producers: Max Norman, Ian Hunter

Ian Hunter chronology
| Short Back 'n' Sides (1981) | All of the Good Ones Are Taken (1983) | Shades of Ian Hunter (1988) |

Singles from All of the Good Ones Are Taken
- 1. "All of the Good Ones Are Taken" Released: 1983

Professional ratings
Review scores
| Source | Rating |
|---|---|
| AllMusic | 3/5 stars |

All of the Good Ones Are Taken is the sixth solo studio album by Ian Hunter. The album contains a mix of several styles. Longtime collaborator Mick Ronson was mostly absent (he only played guitar on one track), because he was seriously considering quitting the music business.

In 2007, the album was reissued with a single bonus track. In a recent biography Ian Hunter explained that the song "Death 'n' Glory Boys" was inspired by the then-current Falklands War. "Somethin's Goin' On" reflects Hunter's reaction to the nuclear arms race. "Speechless" was later covered by Status Quo. "Every Step of the Way" was also later covered by the Monkees on their reunion album Pool It! (1987).

== Track listing ==
All songs written by Ian Hunter except where noted

1. "All of the Good Ones Are Taken" (fast version) – 3:42
2. "Every Step of the Way" (Hunter, Mark Clarke) – 3:55
3. "Fun" (Hunter, Mark Clarke, Hilly Michaels) – 4:21
4. "Speechless" – 3:49
5. "Death 'n' Glory Boys" – 5:57
6. "That Girl is Rock 'n' Roll" – 3:18
7. "Somethin's Goin' On" – 4:33
8. "Captain Void 'n' the Video Jets" – 4:12
9. "Seeing Double" – 4:24
10. "All of the Good Ones Are Taken" (slow version) – 3:48
11. "Traitor" (single version) – 3:57
  - bonus track on reissued CD

== Personnel ==
Adapted from liner notes:

- Ian Hunter - lead vocals, guitar, piano
- Mick Ronson - lead guitar on "Death 'n' Glory Boys"
- Robbie Alter - guitar, vocals
- Tommy Mandel - keyboards
- Bob Mayo - keyboards
- Hilly Michaels - drums
- Mark Clarke - bass guitar, vocals
- Clarence Clemons - tenor saxophone on "All of the Good Ones Are Taken" (slow & fast versions) and "Seeing Double"
- Louis Cortelezzi - alto saxophone
- Dan Hartman - bass guitar on "Speechless"
- Jeff Bova - keyboards on "Speechless"
- Jimmy Ripp - guitars on "All of the Good Ones Are Taken" and "That Girl is Rock 'n' Roll"
- Rory Dodd - backing vocals on "All of the Good Ones Are Taken"
- Eric Troyer - backing vocals on "All of the Good Ones Are Taken"

Technical

- Mike Scott - engineer
- Jon Mathias - remix
- Jim Steinman - "assistance" on "All of the Good Ones Are Taken"
- John Berg, Pietro Alfieri - art direction, design
- Edie Baskin, Sharon Haskel - artwork

== Charts ==
| Chart (1983) | Peak position |
|---|---|
| Canada Top Albums/CDs (RPM) | 98 |
| Norwegian Albums (VG-lista) | 11 |
| Swedish Albums (Sverigetopplistan) | 27 |
| US Billboard 200 | 125 |
