= Dirty Laundry (album) =

Studio album by Ian Hunter
- Released: 10 October 1995
- Genre: Rock
- Length: 49:59
- Label: Cherry Red
- Producer: Björn Nessjö

Ian Hunter chronology
Yui Orta (1989)	Dirty Laundry (1995)	The Artful Dodger (1996)

Professional ratings
Review scores
Source	Rating
AllMusic	4/5 stars

Dirty Laundry is the eighth solo album of Ian Hunter. This album was not planned, because Hunter only intended to record a few songs at Abbey Road Studios. However, twelve tracks were recorded in a fortnight.

The project started out with Norwegian keyboardist Casino Steel, formerly of Hollywood Brats, inviting Hunter to sit in the studio and marked the return of Hunter to the studio since the death of his long-time friend and collaborator Mick Ronson. Darrell Bath and "Honest" John Plain were formerly in the Crybabys and "Vom" was ex-Doctor and the Medics. Unlike his previous solo albums, many songs were written or co-written by others. The album came out with little fanfare in 1995 on a small Norwegian label, with the US company, Cleveland International, also picking it up.

== Track listing ==
1. "Dancing on the Moon" (Hunter, Bath, Plain) – 5:24
2. "Another Fine Mess" (Hunter, Bath, Plain) – 3:28
3. "Scars" (Hunter, Bath, Plain) – 5:04
4. "Never Trust a Blonde" (Bath) – 5:19
5. "Psycho Girl" (Plain) – 2:48
6. "My Revolution" (Steel, Matt Dangerfield, Hunter) – 4:08
7. "Good Girls" (Plain) – 4:01
8. "Red Letter Day" (Hunter) – 5:11
9. "Invisible Strings" (Hunter) – 3:53
10. "Everyone's a Fool" (Bath, Roig) – 2:41
11. "Junkee Love" (Andrew Matheson, Steel) – 2:46
12. "The Other Man" (Hunter) – 5:23

== Personnel ==
- Ian Hunter - guitars, vocals
- Casino Steel (Stein Groven) - keyboards, vocals, percussion
- "Honest" John Plain (John Splain) - guitar, vocals
- Darrell Bath - guitar, vocals
- Glen Matlock - bass
- Steve "Vom" Ritchie - drums
- Blue Weaver - keyboards
- Lasse Hafreager - piano, organ
- Mitt Gamon - harmonica
- Angela Clemmons-Patrick, Bård Svendsen, James Williams, Torstein Flakne, Vaneese Thomas - backing vocals
- Torstein Flakne - guitar on "Invisible Strings"

Technical

- Rune Nordal - technician
- Wolfgang Guerster - photography
