= Rant (Ian Hunter album) =

Studio album by Ian Hunter
- Released: 21 April 2001
- Studio: New Calcutta, New York City
- Genre: Rock
- Length: 56:47
- Label: Papillion (UK), Repertoire (Europe), Fuel2000 (North America)
- Producer: Andy York, Ian Hunter

Ian Hunter chronology
The Artful Dodger (1996)	Rant (2001)	Shrunken Heads (2007)

Professional ratings
Review scores
Source	Rating
Allmusic	3.5/5 stars

Rant is the 10th solo studio album by Ian Hunter and also his most political one in 25 years. Unlike his last three albums which were more collaborative, Hunter wrote all the tracks by himself.

== Track listing ==
All tracks written by Ian Hunter.

=== UK version ===
1. "Ripoff" – 4:50
2. "Good Samaritan" – 4:07
3. "Death of a Nation" – 5:35
4. "Purgatory" – 4:46
5. "American Spy" – 4:30
6. "Dead Man Walkin' (Eastenders)" – 6:20
7. "Wash Us Away" – 3:57
8. "Morons" – 5:32
9. "Soap 'N' Water" – 5:18
10. "Knees of My Heart" – 3:35
11. "No One" – 3:37
12. "Still Love Rock 'n' Roll" – 4:34

=== US version ===
1. "Still Love Rock 'n' Roll" – 4:34
2. "Wash Us Away" – 3:57
3. "Death of a Nation" – 5:35
4. "Morons" – 5:32
5. "Purgatory" – 4:46
6. "American Spy" – 4:30
7. "Dead Man Walkin' (Eastenders)" – 6:20
8. "Good Samaritan" – 4:07
9. "Soap 'N' Water" – 5:18
10. "Ripoff" – 4:50
11. "Knees of My Heart" – 3:35
12. "No One" – 3:37

== Personnel ==
- Ian Hunter - vocals, keyboards, harmonica, acoustic guitar, piano, backing vocals
- Andy York - electric guitar, mandoguitar, groovebox, autoharp, organ, zither, keyboards, mandolin, bass, backing vocals
- Steve Holley - drums, percussion
- Robbie Alter - guitars, bass, piano
- Tommy Mandel - organ, keyboards, loops
- Mickey Curry - drums
- John Conte - bass
- Rich Pagano - backing vocals, bongos, drums
- James Mastro - six-string fuzzbass, mandolin, electric slide, electric 12-string, acoustic 12-string
- Dane Clark - drums
- Doug Petty - organ, keyboards
- Jesse Hunter Patterson - gang vocals
- Lisa Ronson - gang vocals
- Willie Nile - gang vocals
- Rick Tedesco - guitar, gang vocals
