= All American Alien Boy =

Studio album by Ian Hunter
- Released: 1976
- Recorded: January 1976
- Studio: Electric Lady, New York City
- Genre: Rock
- Length: 69:34
- Label: Columbia
- Producer: Ian Hunter

Ian Hunter chronology
Ian Hunter (1975)	All American Alien Boy (1976)	Overnight Angels (1977)

Professional ratings
Review scores
Source	Rating
AllMusic	3.5/5 stars
The Village Voice	B−

All American Alien Boy is the second studio album by Ian Hunter. Because of management issues, Mick Ronson did not appear on this album; instead, Hunter brought in keyboardist Chris Stainton to act as a balancing force in the studio. Unlike his previous album, the album didn't feature any of his trademark rockers (apart from "Restless Youth") and he opted for a more jazzy direction, featuring bassist Jaco Pastorius. The album title is a play on Rick Derringer's 1973 album All American Boy. Queen appear as backing vocalists on the track "You Nearly Did Me In".

In 2006, the album was reissued with several bonus tracks.

== Track listing ==
All songs written by Ian Hunter.

Side one

1. "Letter to Britannia from the Union Jack" – 3:48
2. "All American Alien Boy" – 7:07
3. "Irene Wilde" – 3:43
4. "Restless Youth" – 6:17

Side two

1. "Rape" – 4:20
2. "You Nearly Did Me In" – 5:46
3. "Apathy 83" – 4:43
4. "God (Take 1)" – 5:45

30th Anniversary bonus tracks

1. "To Rule Britannia from Union Jack" (session outtake) – 4:08
2. "All American Alien Boy" (early single version) – 4:03
3. "Irene Wilde (Number One)" (session outtake) – 3:53
4. "Weary Anger" (session outtake) – 5:45
5. "Apathy" (session outtake) – 4:42
6. "(God) Advice to a Friend" (session outtake) – 5:34

== Personnel ==
- Ian Hunter – lead vocals, rhythm guitar, piano on "All American Alien Boy", backing vocals
- Chris Stainton – piano, organ, mellotron, bass guitar on "Restless Youth"
- Jaco Pastorius – bass guitar all tracks, guitar on track "God (Take I)"
- Aynsley Dunbar – drums
- Jerry Weems – lead guitar
- David Sanborn – saxophone
- Dominic Cortese – accordion
- Cornell Dupree – guitar on "Letter to Brittania From the Union Jack"
- Don Alias – congas
- Arnie Lawrence – clarinet
- Dave Bargeron – trombone
- Lewis Soloff – trumpet
- Freddie Mercury – backing vocals on "You Nearly Did Me In"
- Brian May – backing vocals on "You Nearly Did Me In"
- Roger Taylor – backing vocals on "You Nearly Did Me In"
- Bob Segarini – backing vocals
- Ann E. Sutton – backing vocals
- Gail Kantor – backing vocals
- Erin Dickins – backing vocals
- Dave Palmer – engineer, mixing
- Dave Wittman – engineer
- Michael Frondelli – assistant engineer
- Frankie D'Augusta – assistant engineer
- Neal Teeman – assistant engineer

== Charts ==
Chart (1976)	Peak position
Australian Albums (Kent Music Report)	63
Finnish Albums (The Official Finnish Charts)	28
Swedish Albums (Sverigetopplistan)	41
UK Albums (OCC)	29
US Billboard 200	177
