= Calling All Girls (album) =

Studio album by Hilly Michaels
- Released: 1980
- Recorded: 1980
- Studio: A&R Studios and Pennylane Studios, New York City
- Genre: Rock, pop
- Length: 37:59
- Label: Warner Bros. Records Inc.
- Producer: Roy Thomas Baker

Hilly Michaels chronology
Calling All Girls (1980)	Lumia (1981)

Calling All Girls is Hilly Michaels' solo debut, and was released on Warner Bros. Records in 1980.

== Track listing ==
All tracks composed by Hilly Michaels and Kip Saginor except as indicated

Side A
No.	Title	Writer(s)	Length
1.	"Calling All Girls"		3:46
2.	"Teenage Days"		2:53
3.	"Shake It and Dance"	Michaels, Morgan Walker	3:53
4.	"Gemini"		3:56
5.	"U.S. Male"		4:48

Side B
No.	Title	Writer(s)	Length
1.	"Without You"	Michaels, Billy Cross	3:32
2.	"Turn Me On Your Radio"	Michaels, Cross	3:46
3.	"Close Encounters"	Michaels	4:25
4.	"Devotion"		4:19
5.	"Something On Your Mind"	Michaels, Walker	2:41

== Personnel ==
- Hilly Michaels - lead vocals, guitar, drums, percussion
- Dan Hartman - bass, guitar, keyboards, autoharp, backing vocals
- Davey Johnstone - guitar
- Jimmy McAllister - guitar
- Billy Cross - guitar
- Morgan Walker, Tom Mandel - keyboards
- Greg Hawkes - synthesizer
- George Young - saxophone
- Ellen Bernfeld, Ellen Foley, Joe Mauri, Karla DeVito, Liza Minnelli, Lorna Luft, Patrick Linfer-Lau - backing vocals

== Performance ==
Despite strong reviews and a video for "Calling All Girls" that got heavy play on MTV, neither the single nor the album cracked the Billboard charts. (The "Calling All Girls" single did manage to scrape onto the Record World chart at #109.) The second single, "Shake It and Dance" also faltered, but today the LP is considered by some to be a new-wave classic.
