= Cleveland Rocks =

Song by Ian Hunter

from the album You're Never Alone with a Schizophrenic
- Released: March 27, 1979
- Genre: Rock
- Length: 3:48
- Label: Chrysalis
- Songwriter: Ian Hunter
- Producers: Mick Ronson, Ian Hunter

"Cleveland Rocks" is a rock song by Ian Hunter from his 1979 album You're Never Alone with a Schizophrenic. The song is about the city of Cleveland, Ohio and how it rocks. It is seen as a de facto anthem in that city. The song was played every Friday at 5:00 PM on Cleveland radio station WMMS beginning in 1979 and is used as a victory song for the city's sports teams. In recognition of "Cleveland Rocks", Hunter was given the key to the city by Cleveland mayor Dennis Kucinich on June 19, 1979. A cover of the song by The Presidents of the United States of America was used as the theme song for The Drew Carey Show.

== Origins ==
The song was inspired in part by the songwriter's desire to counteract the poor reputation of a city for which he had some affection. Hunter states on his web site, "the inspiration for 'Cleveland Rocks' goes back to the old days when people used to make fun of Cleveland. Cleveland was 'uncool' and LA and NYC were 'cool'. I didn't see it that way. Lotta heart in Cleveland."

The song was first released in 1977 under the title "England Rocks" on a single in the United Kingdom, predating the release of the "Cleveland" version by two years. Hunter has maintained, however, that Cleveland was the original subject of the song, stating on his web site, "I originally wrote 'Cleveland Rocks' for Cleveland. I changed it later to 'England Rocks' because I thought it should be a single somewhere and Columbia wouldn't release it as a single in the U.S. (too regional). 'Cleveland Rocks' is Cleveland's song and that's the truth."

A live version of "Cleveland Rocks" appears on Hunter's 1980 album Welcome to the Club and on the soundtrack to the 1987 film Light of Day, a movie with Joan Jett and Michael J. Fox that is based in Cleveland.

The "England Rocks" version appears on the compilation albums Shades of Ian Hunter: The Ballad of Ian Hunter and Mott the Hoople and The Very Best of Ian Hunter, as well on the CD re-issue of Hunter's 1977 album Overnight Angels.

The original version also serves as an unofficial tribute to the history of rock and roll, as at the beginning of the song, it has an archival sample of Cleveland disc jockey Alan Freed introducing his show on WJW, The Moondog Show, before suddenly segueing into the intro to "Cleveland Rocks". (Freed had been deceased for fourteen years at the time of the release of "Cleveland Rocks".) Freed's show on WJW launched several rock and roll acts in the early days of the genre, and would form part of the basis of opening the Rock and Roll Hall of Fame in Cleveland sixteen years later. Hunter performed "Cleveland Rocks" in the pregame ceremonies of Game 3 of the 2007 NBA Finals at Quicken Loans Arena—the first NBA Finals game played in the state of Ohio.

== Reception ==
Smash Hits said, "The man who launched a thousand poseurs (along with Bowie about the most influential figure of the mid-seventies) returns with a furious, huge production of a number which isn't a million miles away from his 'All the Way from Memphis' classic."

== Cover versions ==
The song was covered in 1997 by The Presidents of the United States of America as the opening theme of the television program The Drew Carey Show, a situation comedy set in Cleveland. It accompanied a lavish opening sequence in which the cast lip-synced the song while performing elaborate choreography. The band covered the entire song with the exception of the portion that said "find a place, grab a space, and yell and scream for more.” Only part of the covered portion was used for the Drew Carey theme. At the beginning of the recording, Drew Carey (a native of Cleveland) can be heard saying "Hey!" and then laughing, and at the end shouting "Ohio!" to an echoing effect. The latter soundbite appears in both the theme song and the full-length version of the song, and is a direct remake of the original, which has a similar "Ohio!" soundbyte at the end. The song is a track on the album Cleveland Rocks! Music from The Drew Carey Show as well as on the band's compilation Pure Frosting. This version is traditionally played after a home win for either the Cleveland Guardians or Cleveland Cavaliers. Although it was never played for the Cleveland Browns, Carey had the Browns fans chant "Cleveland Rocks!" when the team returned to playing in the city in 1999. The song's title has also been referenced several times on The Price is Right, which Carey has hosted since 2007.

Hunter's original version would later open a Drew Carey "mistakes" episode. For the final season of Drew Carey, the theme song was performed in a different musical style for each episode (as were the previous two themes, "Moon Over Parma" from the first season and "Five O'Clock World" from the second).
