= Short Back 'n' Sides =

Short Back n' Sides

Studio album by Ian Hunter
- Released: August 29, 1981
- Genres: Rock; new wave
- Length: 44:55 (Original release); 105:38 (2CD edition)
- Label: Chrysalis
- Producers: Mick Jones, Mick Ronson

Ian Hunter chronology
Welcome to the Club (1980)	Short Back n' Sides (1981)	All of the Good Ones Are Taken (1983)

Professional ratings
Review scores
Source	Rating
AllMusic	4.5/5 stars
The Rolling Stone Album Guide	3/5 stars

Short Back 'n' Sides is the fifth studio album by Ian Hunter. He collaborated with Mick Ronson, Mick Jones, Topper Headon, Todd Rundgren, and Ellen Foley.

In 1995, Chrysalis released a 2 CD set with a remastered version of the album and bonus CD with outtakes of the Chrysalis period. The track "Noises" is an experimental track with many samples used as part of the song and "Theatre of the Absurd" is Ian's only reggae song, inspired by the Ladbroke Grove area of London.

== Track listing ==
All songs written by Ian Hunter; except where indicated

1. "Central Park n' West" – 4:00
2. "Lisa Likes Rock n' Roll" – 3:56
3. "I Need Your Love" – 3:34
4. "Old Records Never Die" – 4:18
5. "Noises" (Ian Hunter, Tommy Morrongiello) – 5:51
6. "Rain" – 5:54
7. "Gun Control" – 3:12
8. "Theatre of the Absurd" – 5:49
9. "Leave Me Alone" – 3:29
10. "Keep On Burning" – 4:46

1995 bonus CD (Long Odds and Out-takes)

1. "Detroit" (rough mix – instrumental) – 3:42
2. "Na Na Na" – 4:13
3. "I Need Your Love" (rough mix) – 3:46
4. "Rain" (alternative mix) – 5:50
5. "I Believe in You" – 4:15
6. "Listen to the Eight Track" – 6:08
7. "You Stepped into My Dreams" – 4:41
8. "Venus in the Bathtub" – 4:29
9. "Theatre of the Absurd" – 6:08
10. "Detroit" (out take 5 – vocal) – 4:00
11. "Na Na Na" (extended mix) – 4:29
12. "China" (Mick Ronson vocal) – 4:36
13. "Old Records Never Die" (version 1) – 4:18

== Personnel ==
- Ian Hunter - lead vocals, guitars, piano
- Mick Ronson - lead guitar, keyboards, vocals
- Tommy Mandel - keyboards
- Tommy Morrongiello - bass, vocals
- Martin Briley - bass
- Eric Parker - drums
- George Meyer - keyboards, vocals
- Mick Jones - guitars, vocals
- Topper Headon - drums, percussion
- Tymon Dogg - violin
- Ellen Foley - vocals
- Miller Anderson - vocals
- Mick Baraken - guitar on "Gun Control"
- Wells Kelly - drums on "Gun Control"
- John Holbrook - bass on "Gun Control"
- Gary Windo - alto saxophone on "I Need Your Love"
- Roger Powell - backing vocals on "I Need Your Love"
- Todd Rundgren - bass, backing vocals on "I Need Your Love"

Technical

- Mixed by Bob Clearmountain; David Tickle on "Rain"
- Lynn Goldsmith - photography

== Charts ==
Chart (1981)	Peak position
Canada Top Albums/CDs (RPM)	20
Norwegian Albums (VG-lista)	14
Swedish Albums (Sverigetopplistan)	18
UK Albums (Official Charts)	79
US Billboard 200	62
