= One Voice (Barry Manilow album) =

Studio album by Barry Manilow
- Released: September 25, 1979
- Studios: United Western, Hollywood; Allen Zentz Recording, Encino
- Genre: Pop
- Length: 40:59
- Label: Arista
- Producers: Barry Manilow; Ron Dante

Barry Manilow chronology
Greatest Hits (1978)	One Voice (1979)	Barry (1980)

Professional ratings
Review scores
Source	Rating
AllMusic	2.5/5 stars
The Rolling Stone Album Guide	1.5/5 stars

One Voice is the sixth studio album by singer/songwriter Barry Manilow, released in 1979. It was recorded at United Western Studios and Allen Zentz Recording in Hollywood. The album peaked at #9 on the Billboard 200 chart and was certified double platinum by RIAA. The album contained three top-40 singles, "Ships" which peaked at #9, "When I Wanted You" at #20 and "I Don't Want to Walk Without You" which hit #36 on the Billboard Hot 100.

The title track was featured in a lengthy segment in an episode of the British comedy show Only Fools and Horses, "Fatal Extraction", where the show's central character Del Boy (David Jason) starts singing the song outside a block of flats late at night after he's been drinking, starting a riot.

The song "Who's Been Sleeping in My Bed?" was sampled in the song "Superheroes" by Daft Punk on the album Discovery.

== Track listing ==
Music and lyrics written by Barry Manilow, except where noted.

=== Side one ===
1. "One Voice" - 3:01
2. "(Why Don't We Try) A Slow Dance" (lyrics: Bruce Sussman and Jack Feldman) - 4:16
3. "Rain" (lyrics: Adrienne Anderson) - 4:48
4. "Ships" (Ian Hunter) - 4:06
5. "You Could Show Me" (lyrics: Bruce Sussman and Jack Feldman) - 1:45
6. "I Don't Want to Walk Without You" (music: Jule Styne; lyrics: Frank Loesser) - 3:54

=== Side two ===
1. "Who's Been Sleeping in My Bed?" (lyrics: Marty Panzer) - 4:36
2. "Where Are They Now" (music: Richard Kerr; lyrics: John Bettis) - 3:59
3. "Bobbie Lee" (lyrics: Enoch Anderson) - 3:32
4. "When I Wanted You" (Gino Cunico) - 3:31
5. "Sunday Father" (lyrics: Enoch Anderson) - 2:51

=== CD bonus tracks ===
1. "They Gave In to the Blues" (non-LP B-side of "Ships") (Included on 1998 and 2006 remasters) - 2:59
2. "Learning to Live Without You" (Demo - Included on 2006 remaster) - 3:46
3. "Where I Want to Be" (Demo - Included on 2006 remaster) - 2:57
4. "I Let Myself Believe" (Demo - Included on 2006 remaster) - 3:38

== Personnel ==
- Barry Manilow – vocals, acoustic piano, backing vocals (1–4, 6–10), rhythm track arrangements
- Bill Mays – keyboards
- Jai Winding – keyboards (2)
- Michael Boddicker – synthesizers
- Ian Underwood – synthesizers (4, 7)
- Mitch Holder – guitars
- Will Lee – bass (1, 3, 5–7, 9, 10)
- David Hungate – bass (2)
- Dennis Belfield – bass (4, 8)
- Ed Greene – drums (1, 3–10)
- Jim Gordon – drums (2)
- Alan Estes – percussion
- Jim Horn – saxophone (9)
- Artie Butler – orchestration
- Jimmie Haskell – horn and string orchestration (2)
- Shaun Harris – contractor
- Sid Sharp – concertmaster
- Ron Dante – backing vocals (2–4, 6–10)
- Monica Burruss – backing vocals (3, 7)
- Muffy Hendrix – backing vocals (3, 7)
- Reparata (Lorraine Mazzola) – backing vocals (3, 7)

=== Production ===
- Barry Manilow – producer
- Ron Dante – producer
- Michael DeLugg – engineer
- Donn Davenport – art direction
- Victor Skrebneski – photography

Reissue credits

- Steve Berkowitz – A&R
- Al Quaglieri – producer
- Andreas Meyer – additional engineer
- Mark Wilder – remastering
- Jeremy Holiday – A&R coordinator
- Zac Profera – A&R coordinator
- Jessica Lizzio – project coordinator
- Madana Eidgah – project director
- Howard Fritzon – art direction
- Michael Boland – design
- Sabeen Ahmad – photo research
- Elizabeth Reilly – photo research
- David Wild – fan notes

== Charts ==
Chart (1979/80)	Peak Position
United States (Billboard 200)	9
Australia (Kent Music Report)	64
United Kingdom (Official Charts Company)	18

== Certifications ==
Region	Certification	Certified units/sales
United Kingdom (BPI)	Gold	100,000^{^}
United States (RIAA)	Platinum	1,000,000^{^}
^{^} Shipments figures based on certification alone.
