= When I Wanted You =

Single by Barry Manilow

from the album One Voice
- B-side: "Bobbie Lee (What's the Difference, I Gotta Live)"
- Released: December 1979
- Genre: Pop
- Length: 3:31
- Label: Arista
- Songwriter: Gino Cunico

Barry Manilow singles chronology
"Ships" (1979)	"When I Wanted You" (1979)	"I Don't Want to Walk Without You" (1980)

"When I Wanted You" is a song whose music and lyrics were written by Gino Cunico. It was first recorded by Gino Cunico (the song's composer) and the Addrisi Brothers.

== Barry Manilow recording ==
The song was later recorded as track from Barry Manilow's 1979 album, One Voice. It was the second of three singles released from the LP, all of which became U.S. Top 40 hits.

"When I Wanted You" peaked at No. 20 on the Billboard Hot 100, No. 24 in Canada, and spent one week at No. 1 on the Adult Contemporary charts of both nations. It was Manilow's seventh No. 1 on the Canadian AC chart and his tenth No. 1 on the US AC chart.

Record World said that Manilow's "dramatic vocal is exhilarating."

== See also ==
- List of number-one adult contemporary singles of 1980 (U.S.)
