= Hilly Michaels =

American musician (1948–2025)

- Born: July 3, 1948; New Haven, Connecticut, U.S.
- Died: November 15, 2025 (aged 77)
- Genres: Rock
- Occupations: Musician; producer
- Instruments: Vocals; guitar; drums
- Years active: 1970s–2025
- Labels: Warner Bros.
- Formerly of: Sparks
- Website: hillymichaels.net

Michael Hillman (July 3, 1948 – November 15, 2025), known professionally as Hilly Michaels, was an American musician who was best known for playing drums with Sparks in the 1970s. Then a New York-based session drummer, he performed on Sparks' 1976 album Big Beat, which was produced by Rupert Holmes. Michaels was the only session musician to go on the North American tour with Ron and Russell Mael of Sparks. Michaels released two solo albums in the early 1980s, Calling All Girls (1980) and Lumia (1981).

== Life and career ==
His first music experience came with playing in a band called Joy, featuring a young Michael Bolton. Later, Michaels played with artists such as The Cherry Vanilla Band, Peach & Lee, Sparks, Ellen Foley, The Hunter/Ronson Band, Dan Hartman, John Mellencamp, Marianne Faithfull, and Ronnie Wood.

In 1979, Michaels signed a million-dollar deal with Warner Bros. Records and a music video to promote Calling All Girls in 1980 with Roy Thomas Baker as the producer.

Michaels was in a relationship with Marianne Faithfull during the mid-1980s; they lived together in New York City.

Michaels' songs can be heard in the movies Caddyshack and Die Laughing. In the movie Rollercoaster, he appeared with Sparks, performing the songs "Big Boy" and "Fill'er Up".

He later worked as a producer and manager of marketing and development. Michaels resided in Connecticut, and died on November 15, 2025, at the age of 77.

== Discography ==
=== Albums ===
- Calling All Girls (1980)
- Lumia (1981)
- Pop This! (2010)

=== Singles ===
- "Calling All Girls" (1980) AUS No. 99
- "Shake It and Dance" (1981) AUS No. 69
