= Ships (song) =

1979 single by Ian Hunter

Single by Ian Hunter

from the album You're Never Alone with a Schizophrenic
- B-side: "Wild East"
- Released: March 1979
- Length: 4:11
- Label: Chrysalis
- Songwriter: Ian Hunter
- Producers: Mick Ronson, Ian Hunter

Ian Hunter singles chronology
"When the Daylight Comes" (1979)	"Ships" (1979)	"We Gotta Get Out of Here" (1980)

"Ships"

Single by Barry Manilow

from the album One Voice
- B-side: "They Gave in to the Blues"
- Released: October 1979
- Length: 4:06
- Label: Arista
- Songwriter: Ian Hunter
- Producers: Barry Manilow, Ron Dante

Barry Manilow singles chronology
"Somewhere in the Night" (1978)	"Ships" (1979)	"When I Wanted You" (1979)

"Ships" is a song written and originally performed by British musician Ian Hunter. The song was first released on Hunter's fourth solo album, You're Never Alone with a Schizophrenic in March 1979. It was later released as a single in August 1979. Hunter's release of the single never made the charts.

The song is said to be about Hunter's relationship with his father. A repeated line in the song is "We're just ships that pass in the night."

== Barry Manilow cover ==
"Ships" was later recorded by singer Barry Manilow for his sixth studio album, One Voice. It was the first of three singles released from the LP, all of which became U.S. Top 40 hits.

Manilow's rendition of "Ships" peaked at number 9 on the Billboard Hot 100 and number 4 on the Adult Contemporary chart. His version also charted at number 78 in Australia and number 28 in Canada.

Cash Box said that Manilow used a slightly different arrangement from Hunter, and that "Manilow's vocals have never been better and the instrumentals are handled with the utmost taste."

Casey Kasem reported on the American Top 40 broadcast of October 27, 1979, the reason that Manilow selected this song to record. His father had been absent from his life since the age of two. Following a concert 30 years later in 1975, Manilow was changing clothes in his dressing room. An unknown man entered his room, telling him simply, "I'm your father. I enjoyed the concert and would like to see you again." He then left.

== Chart history ==
=== Weekly charts ===
Chart (1979–80)	Peak position
Australia (Kent Music Report)	78
Canada RPM Adult Contemporary	5
Canada RPM Top Singles	28
U.S. Billboard Hot 100	9
U.S. Billboard Adult Contemporary	4
U.S. Cash Box Top 100	11

=== Year-end charts ===
Chart (1979)	Rank
U.S. Cash Box	90

Chart (1980)	Rank
U.S. Billboard Hot 100	98
