= Welcome to the Club (Ian Hunter album) =

Live album by Ian Hunter
- Released: March 26, 1980
- Recorded: 5–11 November 1979
- Venues: The Roxy Theatre, West Hollywood, California
- Genre: Rock
- Length: 58:38 (Disc 1); 55:40 (Disc 2)
- Label: Chrysalis
- Producers: Mick Ronson, Ian Hunter

Ian Hunter chronology
The Ballad of Ian Hunter and Mott the Hoople (1979)	Welcome to the Club (1980)	Short Back 'n' Sides (1981)

Professional ratings
Review scores
Source	Rating
Allmusic	4/5 stars

Welcome to the Club is the first live album by Ian Hunter. After the unexpected success of You're Never Alone with a Schizophrenic, Chrysalis Records wanted to keep the momentum by releasing another album. Because Hunter never wrote when he was on the road, it became a live album, which was recorded at the end of his U.S tour. However, there were four new tracks (all of side four) three of which were recorded live in studio.

== Track listing ==
All tracks written by Ian Hunter except where noted.

Side one

1. "F.B.I." (Hank Marvin, Bruce Welch, Jet Harris) – 3:51
2. "Once Bitten Twice Shy" – 5:25
3. "Angeline" – 4:56
4. "Laugh at Me" (Sonny Bono) – 3:40
5. "All the Way from Memphis" – 3:33

Side two

1. "I Wish I Was Your Mother" – 6:47
2. "Irene Wilde" – 4:13
3. "Just Another Night" (Hunter, Mick Ronson) – 6:03
4. "Cleveland Rocks" – 6:01

Side three

1. "Standin' in My Light" – 5:49
2. "Bastard" – 8:12
3. "Walking with a Mountain/Rock 'n' Roll Queen" (Hunter, Mick Ralphs) – 4:19
4. "All the Young Dudes" (David Bowie) – 3:30
5. "Slaughter on Tenth Avenue" (Richard Rodgers) – 2:25

Side four
Recorded live at Media Sound, New York City; 10, 11 January 1980 except track 4 which was recorded at the same shows as the rest of the album.

1. "We Gotta Get Out of Here" – 3:14
2. "Silver Needles" – 5:56
3. "Man O' War" (Hunter, Ronson) – 4:19
4. "Sons and Daughters" – 5:04

== CD reissue ==
Disc 1

1. "F.B.I." (Hank Marvin, Bruce Welch, Jet Harris) – 3:51
2. "Once Bitten, Twice Shy" – 5:25
3. "Angeline" – 4:56
4. "Laugh at Me" (Sonny Bono) – 3:40
5. "All the Way from Memphis" – 3:33
6. "I Wish I Was Your Mother" – 6:47
7. "Irene Wilde" – 4:13
8. "Just Another Night" (Hunter, Mick Ronson) – 6:03
9. "Cleveland Rocks" – 6:01
10. "Standin' in My Light" – 5:49
11. "Bastard" – 8:12

Disc 2

1. "Walking with a Mountain/Rock 'n' Roll Queen" (Hunter, Mick Ralphs) – 4:19
2. "All the Young Dudes" (David Bowie) – 3:30
3. "Slaughter on Tenth Avenue" (Richard Rodgers) – 2:25
4. "One of the Boys" (Hunter, Ralphs) – 7:36
5. "The Golden Age of Rock 'n' Roll" – 4:01
6. "When the Daylight Comes" – 9:00
7. "Medley: Once Bitten Twice Shy/Bastard/Cleveland Rocks" – 6:10
8. "We Gotta Get Out of Here" – 3:14
9. "Silver Needles" – 5:56
10. "Man O' War" (Hunter, Ronson) – 4:19
11. "Sons and Daughters" – 5:04

== Personnel ==
- Ian Hunter - lead vocals, guitar, piano, harp
- Mick Ronson - lead guitar, Moog synthesizer, mandolin, vocals
- Tommy Morrongiello - guitar, vocals
- Tommy Mandel - keyboards
- Martin Briley - bass
- Eric Parker - drums
- George Meyer - keyboards, vocals, saxophone
- Ellen Foley, Susie Ronson - vocals on "We Gotta Get Out of Here"

== Charts ==
Chart (1980)	Peak position
Canada Top Albums/CDs (RPM)	30
German Albums (Offizielle Top 100)	48
Norwegian Albums (VG-lista)	11
Swedish Albums (Sverigetopplistan)	28
UK Albums (Official Charts)	61
US Billboard 200	69
