= The Artful Dodger (album) =

Studio album by Ian Hunter
- Released: 1996 Norway; April 21, 1997 UK
- Recorded: 1995
- Studio: Nidaros Studios, Trondheim, Norway. Additional recordings at The Time Machine, Vermont, USA. Track 7 recorded live 4 October 1995, overdubbed later
- Genre: Rock
- Length: 55:09
- Label: Citadel
- Producer: Björn Nessjö

Ian Hunter chronology
Dirty Laundry (1995)	The Artful Dodger (1996)	Rant (2001)

Professional ratings
Review scores
Source	Rating
AllMusic	2.5/5 stars
Classic Rock	5/10 stars

The Artful Dodger is the ninth solo album of Ian Hunter. Impressed with the production on Dirty Laundry, Hunter collaborated again with Björn Nessjö on this album.
The album was initially released in Norway only, because Hunter felt that he needed management before he could release it in the UK and the US.
The track "Michael Picasso" was a tribute to the late Mick Ronson. The tempo is different from the version performed at the Mick Ronson Memorial Concert in 1994

The album received a broader re-release through MIG Music on July 7, 2014. This release features the original track listing plus one bonus track, "Fuck It Up".

== Track listing ==
All tracks written by Ian Hunter except where noted.

1. "Too Much" – 4:44
2. "Now Is the Time" – 4:54
3. "Something to Believe in" – 5:46
4. "Resurrection Mary" – 6:11
5. "Walk on Water" (Hunter, Robbie McNasty) – 3:48
6. "23A, Swan Hill" – 4:47
7. "Michael Picasso" – 5:45
8. "Open my Eyes" (Hunter, Darrell Bath) – 5:42
9. "The Artful Dodger" – 4:21
10. "Skeletons (In Your Closet)" (Hunter, Darrell Bath, Honest John Plain) – 4:00
11. "Still the Same" – 5:06

=== Bonus track on reissue ===
1. "Fuck It Up" – 6:02

== Personnel ==
- Ian Hunter - lead vocals, acoustic and electric guitars, harp
- Darrell Bath - acoustic, electric and Baryton guitars, lead vocals
- Torstein Flakne - guitars, vocals
- Per Lindvall - drums, percussion
- Sven Lindvall - bass
- Robbie Alter - acoustic, electric and slide guitars
- Kjetil Bjerkestrand - keyboards
- Dennis Eliott - drums
- Pat Kilbride - bass, acoustic bass
- "Honest" John Plain - vocals, lead vocals
- Frode Alnaes - guitar
- Mariann Lisland - vocals
- Per Öisten Sörensen - vocals
- The Vertago String Quartet - strings
