= You're Never Alone with a Schizophrenic =

Studio album by Ian Hunter
- Released: 27 March 1979
- Recorded: 1979
- Studios: Power Station, New York City
- Genre: Rock
- Length: 42:04
- Label: Chrysalis
- Producers: Mick Ronson, Ian Hunter

Ian Hunter chronology
Overnight Angels (1977)	You're Never Alone with a Schizophrenic (1979)	The Ballad of Ian Hunter and Mott the Hoople (1979)

You're Never Alone with a Schizophrenic is the fourth solo studio album by the English singer Ian Hunter. The album featured members of Bruce Springsteen's E Street Band as the backing band. AllMusic considers the album to be Hunter's best.

Hunter says that the title had been spotted on a toilet wall by co-producer Mick Ronson, who planned to use it for one of his solo albums. Hunter loved the title so much that he offered Ronson co-writing credit on the first single "Just Another Night" in exchange for the use of the title for the album. "Just Another Night" reached the Billboard Hot 100 at No. 68. The album became one of Hunter's biggest sellers at the time.

In 2009, EMI released a 30th-anniversary reissue of the album remastered with five bonus tracks on the first disc of outtakes and a second disc of live tracks recorded on the tour to support the album but previously unreleased. The reissue also came with a deluxe booklet discussing the making of the album, along with vintage and new interviews with Hunter.

The song "Cleveland Rocks" (originally recorded as a single for Columbia Records and entitled "England Rocks" around the time of "Overnight Angels") later became a hit when the Presidents of the United States of America re-recorded the song as the theme song to The Drew Carey Show in 1997, raising Hunter's profile. Also, singer Barry Manilow covered the song "Ships" for his album One Voice which became a top-ten hit.

== Critical reception ==
Professional ratings
Review scores
Source	Rating
AllMusic	4.5/5 stars
Christgau's Record Guide	B
The Rolling Stone Album Guide	3/5 stars

The Globe and Mail noted that Hunter's "voice is of the Rod Stewart rasp variety, but with a punkish edge where Stewart's is icily urbane."

== Track listing ==
All tracks written by Ian Hunter except where noted.

Side one

1. "Just Another Night" (Hunter, Mick Ronson) – 4:36
2. "Wild East" – 3:58
3. "Cleveland Rocks" – 3:48
4. "Ships" – 4:11
5. "When the Daylight Comes" – 4:27

Side two

1. "Life After Death" – 3:49
2. "Standin' in My Light" – 4:35
3. "Bastard" – 6:37
4. "The Outsider" – 5:57

=== Deluxe Edition track listing ===
Disc 1

1. "Just Another Night"
2. "Wild East"
3. "Cleveland Rocks"
4. "Ships"
5. "When the Daylight Comes"
6. "Life After Death"
7. "Standin' in My Light"
8. "Bastard"
9. "The Outsider"
10. "Don't Let Go" (Demo)
11. "Ships" (Take 1)
12. "When The Daylight Comes" (Early Version)
13. "Just Another Night" (Early Version) (aka "The Other Side of Life")
14. "Whole Lotta Shakin' Goin' On"

Disc 2

1. "F.B.I." – Live in Agora Ballroom, Cleveland 18/6/79
2. "Once Bitten Twice Shy" – Live in Agora Ballroom, Cleveland 18/6/79
3. "Life After Death" – Live in Agora Ballroom, Cleveland 18/6/79
4. "Sons and Daughters" – Live at the Hammersmith Odeon, London 22/11/79
5. "Laugh at Me" – Live at the Hammersmith Odeon, London 22/11/79
6. "Just Another Night" – Live at the Hammersmith Odeon, London 22/11/79
7. "One of the Boys" – Live at the Hammersmith Odeon, London 22/11/79
8. "Letter to Brittania from Union Jack" – Live in Berkeley Community Theatre, Berkeley 7/7/79
9. "Bastard" – Live in Berkeley Community Theatre, Berkeley 7/7/79
10. "All the Way from Memphis" – Live in Agora Ballroom, Cleveland 18/6/79
11. "Cleveland Rocks" – Live in Agora Ballroom, Cleveland 18/6/79
12. "All the Young Dudes" – Live at the Hammersmith Odeon, London 22/11/79
13. "When the Daylight Comes" – Live in Agora Ballroom, Cleveland 18/6/79
14. "Sweet Angeline" – Live in Agora Ballroom, Cleveland 18/6/79

== Personnel ==
- Ian Hunter – lead vocals, guitar, piano, Moog, ARP, organ, harmony vocals, percussion
- Mick Ronson – guitars, dual lead vocals on "When the Daylight Comes", harmony vocals, percussion
- Roy Bittan – ARP, organ, Moog, piano, harmony vocals
- Max Weinberg – drums
- Garry Tallent – bass
- John Cale – piano & ARP on "Bastard"
- George Young – tenor saxophone
- Lew Delgatto – baritone saxophone
- Ellen Foley – harmony vocals
- Rory Dodd – harmony vocals
- Eric Bloom – harmony vocals

Production

- Mastered by George Marino at Sterling Sound, NYC
- Bob Clearmountain – engineer
- Don Berman, Scott Litt – additional recording
- Georgina Karvellas – illustration

== Charts ==
Chart (1979)	Peak position
Australian Albums (Kent Music Report)	68
Canada Top Albums/CDs (RPM)	45
New Zealand Albums (RMNZ)	42
Swedish Albums (Sverigetopplistan)	26
UK Albums (Official Charts)	49
US Billboard 200	35
