= YUI Orta =

Studio album by Ian Hunter and Mick Ronson Band
- Released: 3 October 1989
- Recorded: 1989
- Studio: Power Station, New York City
- Genre: Hard rock
- Length: 71:11
- Label: Mercury
- Producer: Bernard Edwards

Ian Hunter and Mick Ronson Band chronology
Shades of Ian Hunter (1988)	YUI Orta (1989)	The Very Best of (1990)

Professional ratings
Review scores
Source	Rating
AllMusic	4/5 stars
The Rolling Stone Album Guide	3.5/5 stars

YUI Orta is the seventh solo studio album by English singer Ian Hunter. The title is a play on the phrase "Why you, I ought to...". Hunter reunites again with longtime collaborator Mick Ronson, as The Hunter Ronson Band.

It was intended as a sort of comeback for both men, but the record company did little promotion and eventually they were dropped from the label. There were plans for a follow-up, but these were put on hold when Ronson was diagnosed with liver cancer. In "Big Time", Hunter borrows the riff from his own song "Once Bitten Twice Shy". In "Tell It Like It Is" Ronson borrows the riff from "Get It On".

In 2003, the album was reissued with two bonus tracks.

== Track listing ==
All songs written by Ian Hunter except where noted

(United States) CD (Mercury – catalog number: 838 973-2)
No.	Title	Writer(s)	Length
1.	"American Music"		4:12
2.	"The Loner"		4:47
3.	"Women's Intuition"	Ian Hunter, Mick Ronson	6:31
4.	"Tell It Like It Is"	Ian Hunter, Mick Ronson	4:23
5.	"Livin' in a Heart"		4:34
6.	"Big Time"		4:03
7.	"Cool"	Ian Hunter, Mick Ronson	4:30
8.	"Beg a Little Love"	Ian Hunter, Robbie McNasty	6:26
9.	"Following in Your Footsteps"	Ian Hunter, Mick Ronson	5:02
10.	"Sons 'n' Lovers"		4:55
11.	"Pain"	Ian Hunter, Donnie Kehr	4:43
12.	"How Much More Can I Take"		3:48
13.	"Sweet Dreamer"	Don Gibson, Mick Ronson	6:28
Total length:			64:22

Bonus tracks on 2003 CD re-release
No.	Title	Writer(s)	Length
1.	"4th Hour of My Sleep"	Tucker Zimmerman	3:08
2.	"Power of Darkness"	Mick Ronson, Benny Marshall	3:32

Bonus tracks on 2003 CD re-release. This was a re-release of the January 1971 single by Ronno; which consisted of Benny Marshall (vocals), Mick Ronson (guitar), Tony Visconti (bass) and Woody Woodmansey (drums). Tucker Zimmerman was an American friend of Visconti.

== Personnel ==
- Ian Hunter – lead vocals, backing vocals; piano on "Sweet Dreamer"
- Mick Ronson – guitars, backing vocals
- Pat Kilbride – bass
- Tommy Mandel – keyboards
- Mickey Curry – drums
- Joe Cerisano – backing vocals
- Carmella Long – backing vocals
- Donnie Kehr – backing vocals
- Robbie Alter – backing vocals
- Michèle Vice – backing vocals
- Carola Westerlund – backing vocals
- Bernard Edwards – bass on "Women's Intuition"
- Benny Marshall – vocals on bonus tracks

Technical

- David O'Donnell, Matthew "Boomer" Lamonica, Michael Christopher, Roy Hendrickson – engineer
- Bernard Edwards, Larry Alexander – mixing
- Mitchell Kanner – art director, designer
