= Shrunken Heads (album) =

Studio album by Ian Hunter
- Released: 15 May 2007
- Genre: Rock
- Length: 50:31
- Label: Jerkin Crocus
- Producer: Ian Hunter, Andy York

Ian Hunter chronology
Rant (2001)	Shrunken Heads (2007)	Man Overboard (2009)

Professional ratings
Review scores
Source	Rating
AllMusic	4.5/5 stars
Rolling Stone	3.5/5 stars

Shrunken Heads is the eleventh solo album of British singer-songwriter Ian Hunter and his first since 2001's critically acclaimed Rant.

A bonus CD containing an additional three tracks was included with preorders placed on Ian's web site.

== Track listing ==
All tracks written by Ian Hunter except where noted

1. "Words (Big Mouth)" (Hunter, Andy York) – 5:03
2. "Fuss About Nothin'" – 3:44
3. "When the World Was Round" – 4:50
4. "Brainwashed" – 3:40
5. "Shrunken Heads" – 7:45
6. "Soul of America" – 4:43
7. "How's Your House" – 4:18
8. "Guiding Light" – 4:09
9. "Stretch" – 4:12
10. "I Am What I Hated When I Was Young" – 3:05
11. "Read 'Em 'N' Weep" – 5:02
12. "Your Eyes" – 3.49 *
13. "Wasted" – 5.05 *
14. "Real or Imaginary" – 3.39 *
- * Tracks on the bonus CD

== Personnel ==
- Ian Hunter - lead vocals, acoustic guitar, piano, harmonica, backing vocals
- Andy York - acoustic, electric, 12-string guitar, piano, banjo, ukulele, Wurlitzer, backing vocals, gang vocals
- Steve Holley - drums, percussion, gang vocals
- Graham Maby - bass, gang vocals
- James Mastro - slide, electric, solo, Barytone, buzzsaw guitar, e-bow
- Andy Burton - keyboards, Wurlitzer, organ, accordion, piano
- Jack Petruzzelli - mando, electric, Leslie, Phaser guitar, Omnichord, Wah-Wah
- Mark Bosch - solo guitar
- Soozie Tyrell - strings
- Peter Mushay - keyboards
- Rick Tedesco - staccato piano
- Tony Shanahan - upright bass
- Mary Lee Kortes - vocals, backing vocals
- Christine Ohlman - vocals, backing vocals
- A. Buryon - gang vocals
- Jesse Hunter Patterson - gang vocals
- Dennis Dunaway - gang vocals
- Jeff Tweedy - backing vocals on tracks 1, 2, 8

== Charts ==
Chart (2007)	Peak position
Norwegian Albums (VG-lista)	20
Swedish Albums (Sverigetopplistan)	34
