= The Ballad of Ian Hunter and Mott the Hoople =

Shades of Ian Hunter: The Ballad of Ian Hunter and Mott the Hoople

Compilation album by Ian Hunter
- Released: 1979
- Genre: Rock
- Length: 91:17
- Label: Columbia

Ian Hunter chronology
You're Never Alone with a Schizophrenic (1979)	Shades of Ian Hunter: The Ballad of Ian Hunter and Mott the Hoople (1979)	Welcome to the Club (1980)

Professional ratings
Review scores
Source	Rating
AllMusic	4/5 stars
Christgau's Record Guide	A−

Shades of Ian Hunter: The Ballad of Ian Hunter and Mott the Hoople is a compilation album by Ian Hunter, consisting of tracks by Hunter's previous band Mott the Hoople (tracks 1–13), and solo Hunter tracks as well (tracks 14–23). It was released in 1979 as a double-LP.

== Track listing ==
- Side 1: Mott The Hoople (24:00)
1. "All the Young Dudes"
2. "One of the Boys" (U.S. single version)
3. "Sweet Jane" (U.S. single version)
4. "All the Way from Memphis" (U.S. single version)
5. "I Wish I Was Your Mother"
6. "The Golden Age of Rock 'n' Roll"
7. "Roll Away the Stone"
- Side 2: Mott The Hoople (24:15)
1. "Marionette" (previously unreleased live version)
2. "Rose" (studio version, non-album B-side of "Honaloochie Boogie")
3. "Foxy, Foxy" (U.K. single)
4. "Where Do You All Come From" (U.K. B-side of "Roll Away The Stone", previously unreleased in the U.S.)
5. "Rest in Peace" (studio version, non-album B-side of "The Golden Age Of Rock 'n' Roll")
6. "Saturday Gigs" (U.K. single)
- Side 3: Ian Hunter (24:09)
1. "Once Bitten Twice Shy"
2. "3,000 Miles from Here"
3. "I Get So Excited"
4. "You Nearly Did Me In"
5. "All American Alien Boy"
- Side 4: Ian Hunter's Overnight Angels (18:53)
1. "England Rocks" (previously unreleased in the U.S.)
2. "Wild N' Free" (previously unreleased in the U.S.)
3. "Justice of the Peace" (previously unreleased in the U.S.)
4. "Overnight Angels" (previously unreleased in the U.S.)
5. "Golden Opportunity" (previously unreleased in the U.S.)

== Personnel ==
- David Bowie Composer, Producer
- Dale Buffin Griffin Composer
- Ian Hunter Composer, Guitar, Primary Artist, Producer, Vocals
- Gary Lyons Engineer
- Mott the Hoople Primary Artist, Producer
- Mick Ralphs Composer
- Lou Reed Composer
- Mick Ronson Guitar, Producer, Vocals
- Earl Slick Composer
- Roy Thomas Baker Producer
- Pete Watts Composer
- Gary Weems Guitar
