= Tommy Mandel =

American musician (born 1949)

- Born: June 2, 1949 (age 77); New York City, United States
- Genres: Rock; soft rock
- Occupation: Musician
- Instruments: Keyboards; bass
- Years active: 1981–present
- Website: tommymandel.com

Tommy Mandel (born June 2, 1949) is an American keyboardist most notable for playing with Bryan Adams from 1981 to 1998, starting with the album You Want It You Got It.

== Career ==
Prior to joining Bryan Adams' band, Mandel released a self-titled solo EP.

He joined Dire Straits for their 1982–1983 Love over Gold Tour and featured on the band's 1984 double live album, Alchemy: Dire Straits Live. He also played with Chrissie Hynde of the Pretenders, among many other artists.

He is the musical director of the theatre department at Sarah Lawrence College in Yonkers, New York.

== Partial discography ==
=== Solo ===
- Tommy Mandel EP (1981)
- Mello Magic LP (2018)
- Music For Insomniacs LP (2020)

=== with Bryan Adams ===
- You Want It You Got It
- Cuts Like a Knife
- Reckless
- Into the Fire
- Live! Live! Live!
- Waking Up the Neighbours
- So Far So Good
- The Best of Me
- Anthology 1980–2005

=== with Dire Straits ===
- Alchemy: Dire Straits Live
- Money for Nothing
- Sultans of Swing: The Very Best of Dire Straits

=== with Ian Hunter ===
- Welcome to the Club
- Short Back 'n' Sides
- All of the Good Ones Are Taken
- Yui Orta

=== with the Clash ===
- Combat Rock
- Sound System

=== with Bon Jovi ===
- 7800° Fahrenheit

=== with David Johansen ===
- In Style
- Here Comes the Night

=== with Peter Wolf ===
- Come As you Are

=== with Little Steven ===
- Freedom – No Compromise

=== with Nils Lofgren ===
- Flip

=== with the B-52s ===
- Cosmic Thing

=== with John Waite ===
- Mask of Smiles
- Rover's Return

=== with Cyndi Lauper ===
- A Night to Remember

=== with the Pretenders ===
- Get Close

=== with Tina Turner ===
- Break Every Rule

=== with Foreigner ===
- Unusual Heat

=== with Ellen Foley ===
- Night Out
- Another Breath

=== with Elliott Murphy ===
- Affairs
- Change Will Come

=== with Hilly Michaels ===
- Calling All Girls
