= Down 'n' Outz =

English rock band

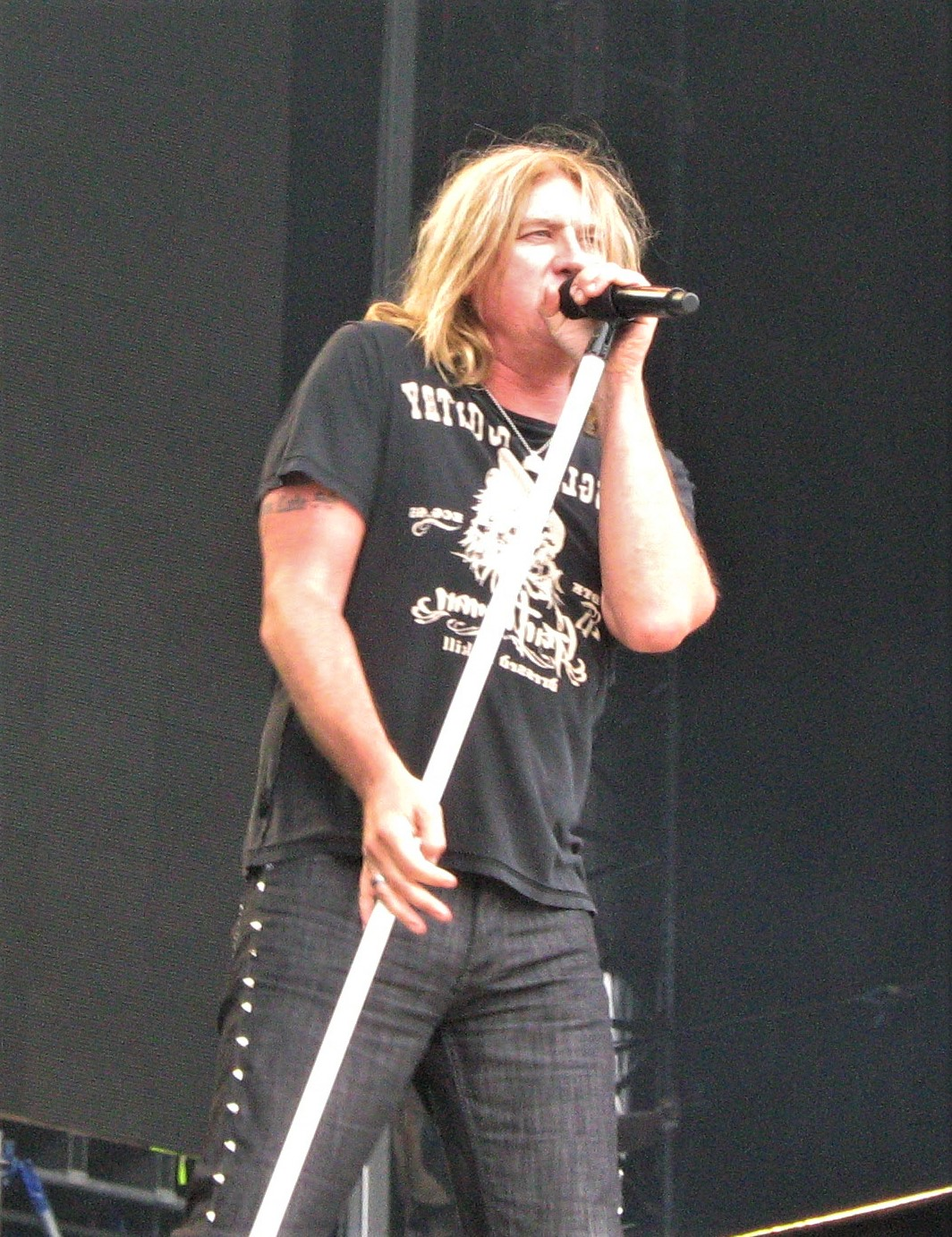
- Joe Elliott at Arrow Festival in 2008.

Background information
- Origin: England
- Years active: 2009–present
- Labels: Bludgeon Riffola/UMC; Mailboat; Frontiers
- Members: Joe Elliott; Paul Guerin; Guy Griffin; Keith Weir; Phil Martini; Share Ross
- Past members: Ronnie Garrity
- Website: downnoutz.net

Down 'n' Outz are an English rock band featuring members from Def Leppard, The Quireboys, and Raw Glory. The group covers bands and artists related to Mott the Hoople including Mott, British Lions, and Ian Hunter. Their debut album, My ReGeneration, was released in 2010, and was followed by a DVD release of the band's show at Hammersmith Odeon. The band's second studio album, The Further Adventures Of... was released in April 2014. The band's third studio album, This Is How We Roll was released in October 2019.

== History ==
The band was formed by Joe Elliott from Def Leppard, London rock drummer Phil Martini, Ronnie Garrity from Raw Glory, and Paul Guerin, Guy Griffin, and Keith Weir from The Quireboys, to open for Mott the Hoople on the last night of the ensemble's tour at London's Hammersmith Apollo in 2009. The band then decided to record an album, produced by Elliott and Ronan McHugh, which was recorded in Elliott's personal studio with basic tracking done at Moor Hall studio Bedfordshire by engineer Chris Corney. A ten-track version of the album, My ReGeneration, was available with the 23 June 2010 edition of Classic Rock magazine, prior to the full album's release on 13 July of the same year.

The band made an appearance at the 2010 High Voltage Festival, launched their own branded beer, and also announced it would be performing with Paul Rodgers in April 2011 as the opening act on the latter's UK tour.

In an interview given by Joe Elliott to Irish TV programme Ireland AM the singer revealed the support dates were never meant to happen and only occurred due to Rodgers insistence. Down 'n' Outz played a secret headline performance (at that time expected to be the only headline gig in the band's existence) on 13 April 2011 in Holmfirth.

The band released a DVD, Down n Outz: Live at the Hammersmith Odeon. Recorded live at Hammersmith Apollo when the Down n Outz opened for Mott The Hoople on the last night of their five-night run back in October 2009. The DVD was directed by Lee Ford, who also shot the promos for England Rock, Overnight Angels and Rock n Roll Queen.

In March 2011, it was revealed that the band parted ways with Ronnie Garrity, and they intended to publish original material for their third album, rather than their fourth.

On 21 April 2014, Down 'n' Outz released their second studio album, The Further Adventures Of...

Their second album was welcomed with good reviews; Classic Rock Magazine stated their Further Adventures "raises the bar for Mott The Hoople covers while giving timeless songs a new lease of life as classics deserving of a new audience." On 29 May, the group followed their album release with the premiere of the video for their first single, "Rock and Roll Queen" on Billboard.com.

On 9 June 2014, it was announced that Down 'n' Outz would be the special guests on the main stage at Planet Rock Radio's "Planet Rockstock" on 6 December at Park Dean Holiday Park in Trecco Bay, Porthcawl, Wales, joining Vandenberg's Moonkings, Magnum, The Cadillac Three, Tax The Heat and Voodoo Six among others.

On 29 July 2014, the group released their second single and video for the song "One of the Boys", which originally was the B-side to Mott The Hoople's single "All The Young Dudes." The single eventually peaked into the Top 10 on the U.S. “classic rock” radio chart. Garrity was replaced by Vixen's Share Ross on bass for their 2014 dates, and she became a permanent member of the band shortly thereafter.

In December 2014, Down 'n' Outz kicked off their 10-date UK tour to support the new album.

To coincide with their December UK tour, Down 'n' Outz released the video for the song "Sea Diver", a bonus track taken from the iTunes release of their album The Further Adventures of….

On 1 December 2017, the band released the DVD and live album, "The Further Live Adventures Of...", which was recorded in December 2014 in Sheffield. They also re-issued their two studio albums on the same day.

On 17 August 2018, guitarist Guy Griffin announced during an interview with Sean Bennett on The Rockpit website that the band were almost at the stage of completing a third album, this time composed of original tracks written by the group. The album is to be released in 2019. Griffin said of the new album," Yeah, but this one is all original material this time. It’s all done and dusted and just need to be mixed. So that will be out next year sometime. And it’s absolutely fantastic, probably one of the best records I’ve worked on. It doesn’t sound like Leppard or the first two Down n Outz records. It’s kind of all the stuff Joe grew up with, a lot of piano type stuff, a bit Elton John, one track a bit 10cc, a couple of good rockers… a real mix of stuff. Joe’s voice sounds amazing and its great fun to do. We recorded it in the studio that Leppard record all their stuff. So it will be out next year but it’s trying to fit it in between Quireboys and Leppard stuff."

== Discography ==
=== Studio albums ===
- My ReGeneration (2010)
- The Further Adventures Of... (2014)
- This Is How We Roll (2019)

=== Live albums ===
- Live at Hammersmith Apollo (2011)
- The Further Live Adventures Of... (2017)
