= New York and Queens =

- The Drew Carey Show episode
- Episode no.: Season 2 Episode 24
- Directed by: Brian K. Roberts
- Written by: Christy Snell; Terry Mulroy
- Production code: 465924
- Original air date: May 14, 1997

Guest appearances
- Donald Trump as himself; Carol Channing as herself; Nicholas Turturro as the Detective; Luis Antonio Ramos as Clerk; Paul Cassell as Todd; Peter Iacangelo as the Ice Cream Vendor

Episode chronology
← Previous "Win a Date with Kate"	Next → "Drew vs. Billboard"

"New York and Queens" is the twenty-fourth episode and season finale of the second season of the American sitcom The Drew Carey Show, and the 46th overall. The episode centers on Drew (Drew Carey) and his friends taking a disastrous road trip to New York City. Upon returning to Cleveland, the group decide to attend a midnight screening of The Rocky Horror Picture Show, only to be confronted by rival fans of its replacement The Adventures of Priscilla, Queen of the Desert. A dance-off between the two sets of fans then ensues.

The episode was co-written by Christy Snell and Terry Mulroy, while Brian K. Roberts directed. It first aired on May 14, 1997, on ABC in the United States. "New York and Queens" features guest appearances from businessman Donald Trump and actors Carol Channing and Nicholas Turturro. The cast rehearsed the dance scenes and shot the episode at the Warner Brothers Studios in Burbank, California. They lip-synced to the tracks, both of which were later included on the show's official album.

"New York and Queens" was seen by an estimated 11.4 million viewers, finishing in 18th place in the ratings the week it aired. The episode received mixed to positive reviews from television critics. Some praised the guest appearances and believed the episode was funny, while others thought it was juvenile and the dance numbers were "overdone self-indulgence". "New York and Queens" earned three nominations at the 49th Primetime Creative Arts Emmy Awards for Outstanding Art Direction, Choreography and Costumes.

== Plot ==
At the Winfred-Lauder department store, Drew is speaking to Todd about his lateness, when their boss Mr. Wick gives Drew an award for working 3,000 days at the store without taking a day off. The award makes Drew feel like he has wasted his life and he convinces his friends Kate, Lewis and Oswald to take a trip to New York City in the Buzz Beer delivery truck, so they can watch a baseball game. Once they make it to the city, the gang become stuck in a large traffic jam. While waiting, they meet Donald Trump, who, upon learning they are visiting from Cleveland, gives them free tickets to his box at Yankee Stadium. The gang become annoyed when somebody repeatedly rams their truck from behind and Drew soon discovers that it is Carol Channing. Once the traffic clears, the gang realise the truck is out of fuel.

To make some quick money, Drew and Lewis sell two cases of beer to a local store clerk. An ice cream cart vendor begins hitting the truck, as he thinks the gang are trying to take over his territory, and Drew argues with him. A detective arrives on the scene and arrests the gang for selling alcohol without a license. After returning home to Cleveland, Drew convinces Kate, Lewis and Oswald to go watch a midnight screening of The Rocky Horror Picture Show. As they arrive at the theater, they are surprised to see that their film has been replaced with The Adventures of Priscilla, Queen of the Desert, which Drew's enemy Mimi Bobeck, Mr. Wick and other office workers have come to see. The gang argue with the Priscilla fans about which film is better and a dance-off ensues. The police break it up and arrest Drew and Mimi. Back at Drew's house, Kate questions why they keep getting sucked into big dance numbers and Drew gets up to sing and dance again.

== Production ==
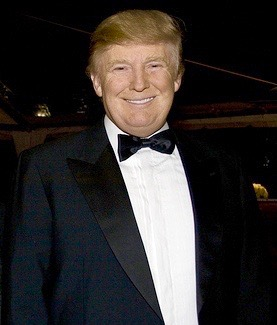
Donald Trump guest starred as himself in the episode.

"New York and Queens" was co-written by Christy Snell and Terry Mulroy, and directed by Brian K. Roberts. It was the second season-finale of The Drew Carey Show and aired on May 14, 1997. The episode sees Drew and his friends taking a road trip to New York City, where they receive a less than friendly welcome. Upon returning home to Cleveland, Drew convinces his friends to attend a midnight showing of The Rocky Horror Picture Show, but they find the movie theater is showing The Adventures of Priscilla, Queen of the Desert, which Drew's arch-enemy Mimi and her friends are there to see. After an argument about which film is better, a dance-off then ensues between the rival fans set to the "Time Warp" and "Shake Your Groove Thing".

"New York and Queens" was not the first episode of The Drew Carey Show to feature the cast taking part in a musical number. Previous dance routines had helped give the show a ratings boost. Carey stated that he would limit himself to one musical number in the third season, quipping "Too many of them is like too much chocolate." Executive producer and co-creator of The Drew Carey Show, Bruce Helford said that stunt programming became necessary to help promote the show. He explained "With fewer people watching the networks, on-air promotion doesn't work as well as it used to. So if you really want to draw people to your show, you've got to find a way to get yourself noticed in the media at large. And to do that, you need a big event."

The cast rehearsed the dance routines on a sound stage at the Warner Brothers Studios in Burbank, where the episode was also shot. During one rehearsal, Friends actor Matthew Perry came to watch and Carey invited him to join in. The cast lip-synced to the music. Both "Time Warp" and "Shake Your Groove Thing" were included on the show's official album Cleveland Rocks! Music from The Drew Carey Show, which was released in 1998. The episode also featured guest appearances from Carol Channing, businessman Donald Trump and NYPD Blue actor Nicholas Turturro.

== Reception ==
=== Ratings ===
In its original broadcast, "New York and Queens" finished 18th in ratings for the week of May 12–18, 1997, with a Nielsen rating of 11.7, equivalent to approximately 11.4 million viewing households. It was the fourth highest-rated show on ABC that week, following episodes of Home Improvement, 20/20 and Ellen.

=== Critical response ===
The episode received mixed to positive reviews from critics. The Daily News's Eric Mink praised "New York and Queens" for being "light-years better" than the second season finale of The Naked Truth, which aired on the same day. Mink thought the opening scene of the episode was "hilarious" and liked the guest appearances, saying "The show gets some surprisingly good comic mileage from guest appearances by Donald Trump, Nick Turturro (NYPD Blue) and especially Carol Channing, whose description of Carey's rear end is classic." Mink bemoaned the ending with the dance numbers, calling it "a big dud" and "overdone self-indulgence." Bill Ward from Star Tribune also enjoyed Trump, Turturro and Channing's appearances, calling them "interesting guest turns". Lon Grahnke, writing for the Chicago Sun-Times, gave the episode three stars and said "Known for its wild production numbers on ABC, The Drew Carey Show" swings into a funny, frenzied, cross-dressing dance-off during tonight's episode." James Joyce from The Newcastle Herald called the dance-off "weird". Another reporter chose "New York and Queens" as one of their "TV Highlights" for the week it aired in Australia.

John Martin from the Telegraph Herald stated "This show has a style all its own. There are times when the writing could be better; in some ways tonight's outing is an example – there's practically no plot. But Carey is unique among today's comedy stars. And man can he shake it." The Boston Globe's Michael Blowen thought the show did "light up the screen with the season finale", adding that the costumes were "bizarre". Ashley Collard from The Sydney Morning Herald disliked the episode, calling it "juvenile stuff". Collard thought the episode failed to develop after a promising opening. She added "What a load of piffle. As Bill Oddie once opined of Felicity Kendal, these characters are all 'too bloody nice'. Surely any non-teetotal Midwestern joe having a midlife crisis when trapped in traffic on the way to a sporting event in a truck full of beer would choose to open a bottle, and I can see far more opportunity for humour in that scenario. This is cerebral meringue that will decay your brain; watch it against advice."

The New York Times's Warren Berger included "New York and Queens" in his list of 10 Stunts To Remember in December 1997, commenting "Good ratings. And back last spring, big dance numbers still seemed like a novelty." Judy Berman from Flavorwire also included the episode in her list of "10 Notable Rocky Horror Tributes". In October 2010, Rich Keller of The Huffington Post asked readers who did the "Time Warp" dance number better; The Drew Carey Show or teen musical drama Glee. The Drew Carey Show received 339 votes (60.8%), compared to Glee's 219 (39.2%).

=== Accolades ===
At the 49th Primetime Creative Arts Emmy Awards, "New York and Queens" earned nominations for Outstanding Art Direction for a Single-Camera Series (John Shaffner, production designer; Joe Stewart, art director; Ed McDonald, set decorator), Outstanding Choreography (Keith Young, choreographer) and Outstanding Costumes for a Series (Julie Rhine, costume designer).
