= Ian Hunter (singer) =

British musician (born 1939)

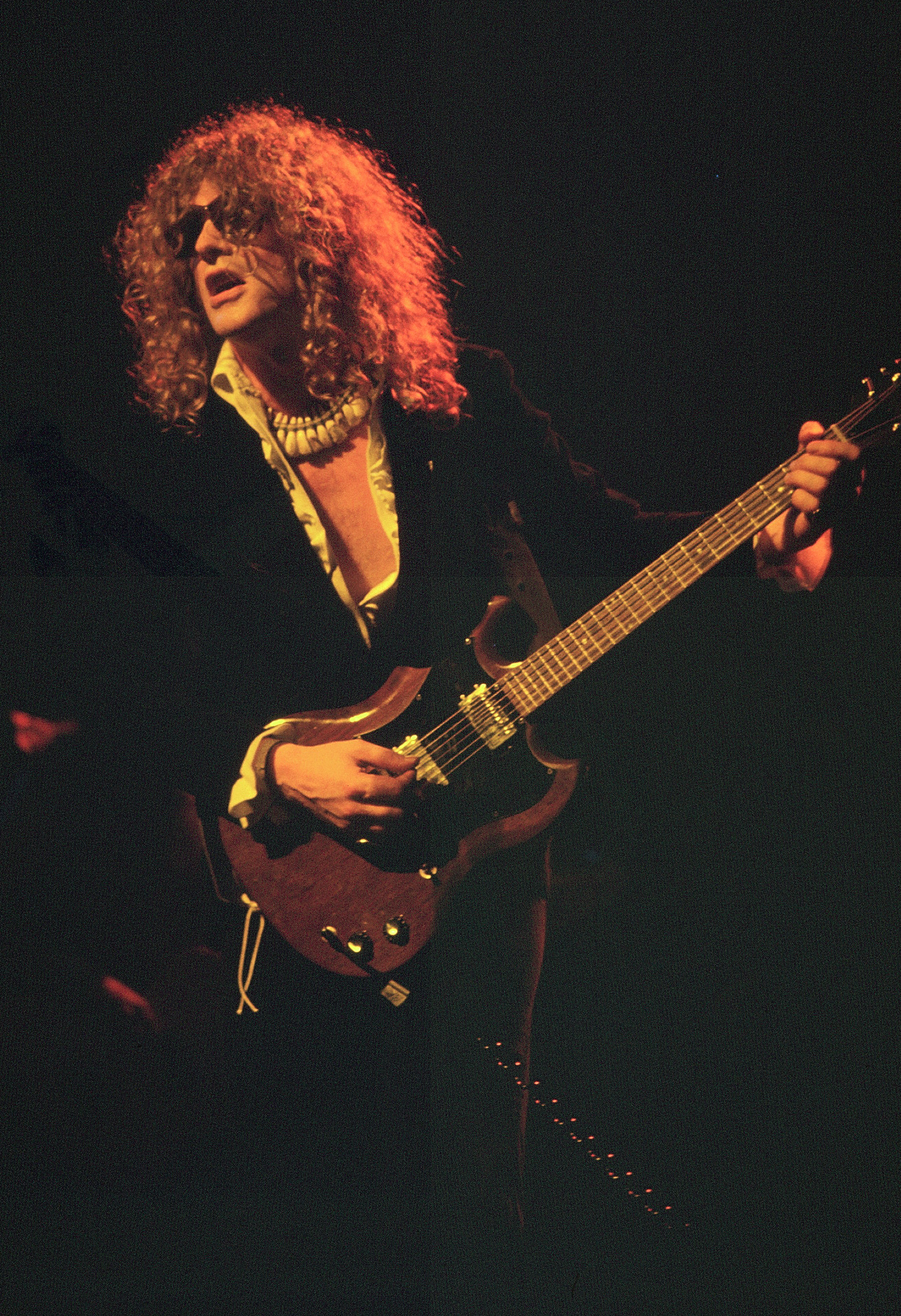
- Hunter performing in 1973

Background information
- Born: Ian Hunter Patterson; 3 June 1939 (age 87); Oswestry, Shropshire, England
- Education: The Priory Grammar School for Boys, Shrewsbury
- Genres: Hard rock; glam rock
- Occupations: Singer; songwriter; musician
- Instruments: Vocals; piano; guitar
- Years active: 1958–present
- Labels: Yep Roc; Proper Records; Jerkin' Crocus; Chrysalis; Island; CBS; Columbia
- Website: ianhunter.com

Ian Hunter Patterson (born 3 June 1939) (Note: Although official and other reliable sources give a birth year of 1939, as Hunter himself stated in an interview (given here as a reference), some sources give the year erroneously as 1946.) is an English singer, songwriter and musician. He is best known as the lead vocalist of the rock band Mott the Hoople, from its inception in 1969 to its dissolution in 1974, and at the time of its 2009, 2013, and 2019 reunions. Hunter was a musician and songwriter before joining Mott the Hoople, and continued in this vein after he left the band. He embarked on a solo career despite ill health and disillusionment with commercial success, and often collaborated with Mick Ronson.

Mott the Hoople achieved some commercial success, and attracted a small but devoted fan base. As a solo artist, Hunter charted with lesser-known but more wide-ranging works outside the rock mainstream. His best-known solo songs are "Once Bitten, Twice Shy", later covered by Great White, and "England Rocks", which was modified to "Cleveland Rocks" and then covered by the American rock band the Presidents of the United States of America, and became one of the theme songs used for the American TV series The Drew Carey Show.

== Early years ==
Ian Hunter Patterson was born on 3 June 1939 in Oswestry, Shropshire, England. Due to the onset of war, the family moved to Hamilton, South Lanarkshire, to live with the family of his Scottish father. Hunter was brought up there until the age of six and has stated that he considers himself a Scot, but also identifies as English. He received his secondary education in Shropshire at The Priory Grammar School for Boys, Shrewsbury.

Hunter's entry into the music business came after a chance encounter with Colin York and Colin Broom at a Butlin's holiday camp, where the trio won a talent competition performing "Blue Moon" on acoustic guitars. York and Broom were members of a Northampton-based band called the Apex Group, fronted by bass player and band leader Frank Short. Hunter soon left his home in Shrewsbury, transferred his apprenticeship from Sentinel/Rolls-Royce to British Timken in Northampton, and joined the Apex Group on rhythm guitar. Hunter recalls jumping around like a lunatic on stage: "Music affected me so much. The rest of them just stood there. It was funny, I had kids who came just to watch me do this, and I can't imagine what it looked like."

Hunter left the Apex Group in 1958, just before they recorded their first single "Yorkshire Relish" / "Caravan" for John Lever Records. Hunter played in a few local groups, but eventually his financial situation forced a change. "I wasn't making my hire-purchase payments, and 'little jobs' were getting done and people were getting smacked. I was never in the middle of it, but I was always somewhere in the area." He returned to Shrewsbury, ostensibly to become more responsible in his personal life, and settled down enough to have a steady girlfriend in Diane Coles. Outside of his day job, he and Tony Wardle formed a harmonica duo inspired by Morton Fraser's Harmonica Gang, a local variety act.

It was during this period – late 1963 or early 1964 – that the Apex recorded a second disc for John Lever records, released as the Apex Rhythm & Blues All Stars. The four-song EP included their own "Tall Girl", and covers of Chuck Berry's "Reeling and a-Rocking" and "Down the Road a Piece", and Jimmy Gilmer and the Fireballs' "Sugar Shack". Hunter probably does not appear on this record; the EP was recorded around the time Hunter left the group for the second time.

At Freddie Lee's suggestion, his backing band the Shriekers began taking jobs in the same German clubs where The Beatles had cut their teeth a few years earlier. In an interview taped in 2004, Hunter volunteers that Lee and their gigs in Hamburg were a major turning point, at which he first began to "think maybe I could do this instead of working in factories."

In 1966, Hunter moved to London, where he joined the Scenery with guitarist Miller Anderson, drummer Dave Dufort and keyboard player Dante Smith. There Hunter met Mick Ronson, then guitarist of bands the Voice and the Rats, at the Flamingo Club in London. According to Anderson, "Mick was coming down the stairs ... and we were going up and I said, `Mick, this is my friend, Ian [Hunter] Patterson.'" The Scenery, now with John Vernon Smith on drums, recorded tracks with Bill Farley at Regent Sound that were licensed for international release without their knowledge. Hunter and Anderson recall writing and recording "To Make a Man Cry," but not the B-side, "Thread of Time." John Vernon Smith appears on the picture sleeve, but Johnny Banks, of the Merseybeats, played on the record. Johnny Gustafson was also included in the session work. The songs were released on the Impact label, and it is unclear whether they originated from France or Belgium.

Hunter remained in the band after Anderson's early 1968 departure. Anderson and J.V. Smith were replaced by guitarist Chris Mayfield and drummer Pete Phillipps, and the group backed up Freddie Lee in At Last the 1958 Rock and Roll Show. They got a regular booking at The Angel in Edmonton, and drew interest from both Chrysalis Records and NEMS but were signed by neither. With Miller Anderson back in place of Mayfield, the group released a single on CBS called "I Can't Drive". As the short-lived rock and roll revival waned, At Last the 1958 Rock and Roll Show changed its name to Charlie Woolfe and released a final single, "Dance, Dance, Dance".

During these obscure early years for Hunter, Hereford band Shakedown Sound, with future Mott members (Mick Ralphs, Verden Allen, Pete Watts, and Dale Griffin) in their ranks, gigged in roughly the same circles but without any record company interest.

Hunter played with various other artists throughout the 1960s, including the Young Idea, Billy Fury, and David McWilliams. In late 1968, Mickie Most hired Hunter and Dufort to play in a band that was to be called the New Yardbirds, a name that Jimmy Page had been using for his post-Yardbirds group before discarding it in favour of Led Zeppelin. This led confused fans to think that Hunter had been a member of Led Zeppelin. Explained Hunter: "See: this is rubbish, but people read it and believe it." Hunter also worked as a journalist and staff songwriter for Francis, Day & Hunter Ltd., did road-digging for a local council, and reported for a local newspaper.

== Career ==
=== Mott the Hoople ===
By 1969, Hunter had two children, but was still hoping for a return to making music full-time. Meanwhile, guitarist Mick Ralphs joined organist Verden Allen in Jimmy Cliff's backing band, the Shakedown Sound. Eventually Ralphs, Allen, vocalist Stan Tippins, bassist Overend Watts, and drummer Dale Griffin united to become Silence, who auditioned for British impresario Guy Stevens. Silence renamed themselves after Willard Manus' 1966 novel, Mott the Hoople. The band lacked a credible singer with stage presence, and the seasoned Hunter, who had by this time taken to wearing his trademark sunglasses, auditioned for a laugh and was given the position. They were a critical success in the UK, where some of their most dedicated early fans included future members of the Clash. However, they could not sustain their commercial appeal, and their American tours were slow in building a following. Mott released several LPs and attracted enthusiastic live audiences, but experienced dismal sales despite the svengali-like leadership and promotion of Stevens. After a 1972 concert in a disused gas holder in Switzerland, the band announced their end.

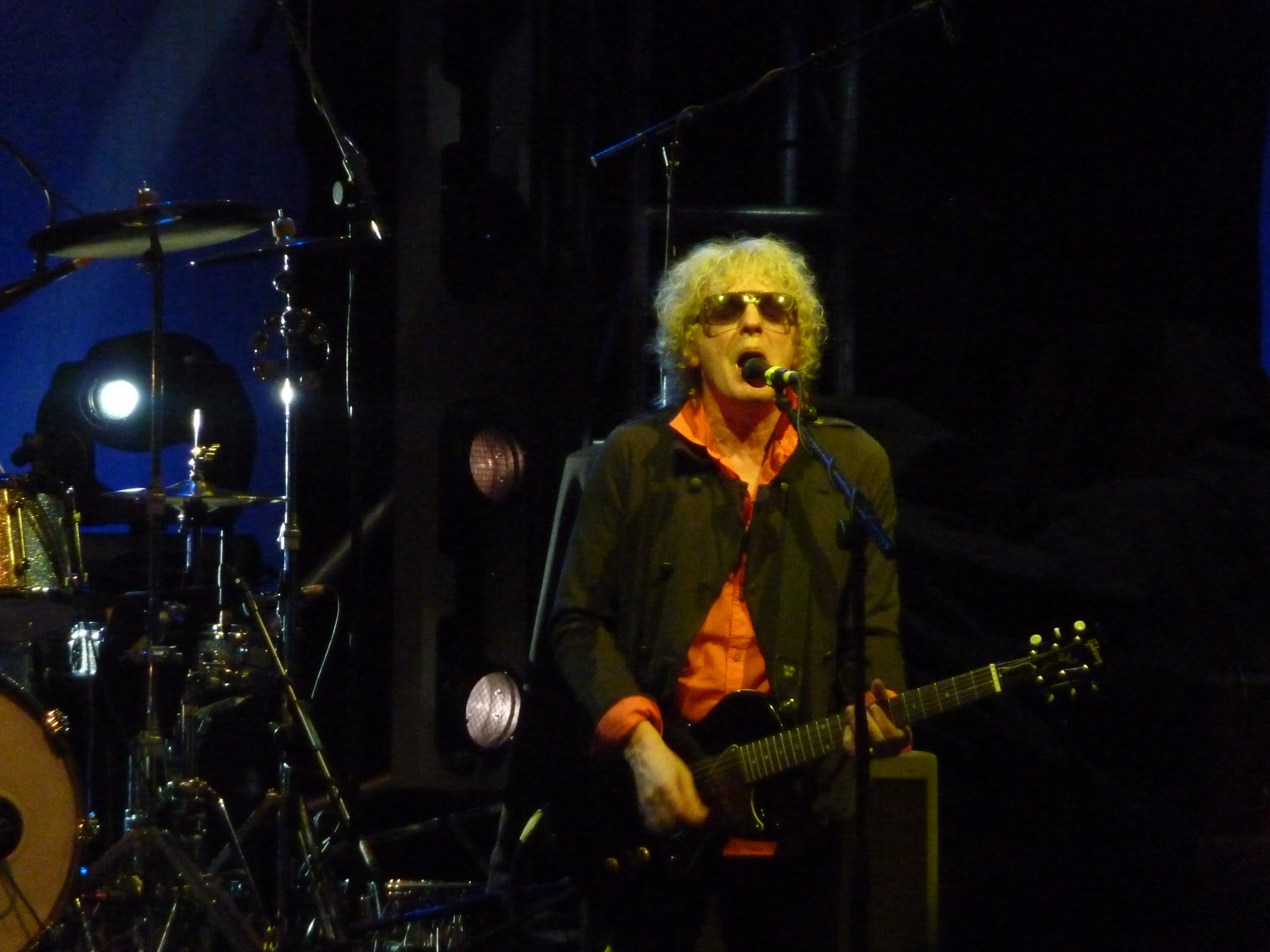
Hunter fronting Mott the Hoople at a reunion gig, Hammersmith Apollo, October 2009

David Bowie, a fan of the band, then offered them a song he had just written. As Hunter recalled in a 2004 DVD interview, "He offered us "Suffragette City", which I didn't think was good enough. And then he sat down on the floor, Regent Street it was, in a publisher's office, and plays "All the Young Dudes" on an acoustic guitar." It reached No. 3 in the UK Singles Chart, and revived the band, who were appreciative of Bowie's rescue. Guitarist Ralphs relates that Bowie taught Mott studio tricks, but one of the best-known sounds during the period was a 'hand-clap-in-the-toilet' routine that relied more on Hunter's vision than it did on Bowie's clearly more experienced studio abilities. Bowie guitarist Mick Ronson also significantly contributed to Mott's sound, a fact noticed by Hunter, who would later collaborate with Ronson a great deal.

The post-Bowie Mott the Hoople had notable commercial success with the albums All the Young Dudes (1972, produced by Bowie); Mott (1973) and The Hoople (1974). The band experienced financial success with songs such as "Roll Away the Stone", "Golden Age of Rock 'n' Roll", "Honaloochie Boogie", "All the Way From Memphis", "Saturday Gigs", and especially "All the Young Dudes". Hunter chronicled the highs and lows of touring in Diary of a Rock'n'Roll Star, his journal of a chaotic five-week American tour in November and December 1972. Ralphs left in 1973 to form Bad Company, and Hunter began to play guitar until Luther Grosvenor took over. Hunter at the same time was increasingly pressured to write hits for the band.

Grosvenor, aka Ariel Bender, was briefly replaced by Ronson, formerly the leading member of Bowie's backing band the Spiders from Mars, after the release of a live album following The Hoople. Hunter left the band in December 1974. The remaining members (Dale 'Buffin' Griffin, Pete 'Overend' Watts, and Morgan Fisher) carried on under the names Mott and the British Lions, which also included former members of Medicine Head.

On 16 January 2009, several sources, including Hunter's own website, announced that Mott the Hoople would reunite for two concerts at the Hammersmith Apollo in London, on 2 and 3 October 2009. These two dates sold out, and three additional dates were added. In the end, Mott the Hoople played two warm-up gigs in Monmouth, five nights at the Hammersmith Apollo, and made a final appearance at the Tartan Clefs Charity night at the Kelvin Hall that November. A further British tour in 2013, taking in Birmingham, Newcastle, Glasgow and Manchester (which was released on CD and DVD), culminated in a last night at The O2 arena on 18 November 2013.

=== 1970s ===
In March 1975, Hunter joined forces with Mick Ronson, his most frequent collaborator until Ronson's death in 1993. Hunter's first single from his eponymous solo album was the UK Top 40 hit "Once Bitten Twice Shy". Hunter and Ronson then parted professionally, reportedly due to Hunter's refusal to deal with Ronson's manager, Tony DeFries.

Hunter's second solo album, All American Alien Boy (1976), was a more soul-infused work which featured saxophonist David Sanborn and bassist Jaco Pastorius. Queen, once an opening act for Mott the Hoople, provided backing vocals on one track.

Hunter's next album, Overnight Angels (1977), was produced by Roy Thomas Baker and featured a heavier guitar sound courtesy of former Bowie sideman Earl Slick. Hunter's record label in America, Columbia Records, refused to release the album in the US due to issues concerning Hunter's management: "Overnight Angels was not released in the US because I fired my manager, Fred Heller, during the English promotional tour – just before it was to be released in America. Columbia said they didn't want to release it until I had new management and that dragged on until it became too late."

In late 1978, Hunter produced Generation X's second LP Valley of the Dolls (1979).

Ronson returned as producer and guitarist on Hunter's 1979 album, You're Never Alone with a Schizophrenic, which also featured John Cale and Roy Bittan, Garry Tallent and Max Weinberg from Bruce Springsteen's E Street Band. Two songs from ...Schizophrenic became successes for other artists: Barry Manilow's version of "Ships" became a top ten US hit in late 1979, and the Presidents of the United States of America's 1997 cover of "Cleveland Rocks" was used as one of the theme songs for The Drew Carey Show. "Cleveland Rocks" is arguably Hunter's most enduring solo song; a de facto anthem in Cleveland, Ohio, where it is sometimes used as a victory song for the city's sports teams. Hunter was given the key to the city by Cleveland mayor Dennis Kucinich on 19 June 1979. The same year, Hunter co-produced with Ronson, Ellen Foley's Night Out album, where he also contributed keyboards, guitar, and percussion.

=== 1980s ===
The best-selling status of ...Schizophrenic led Hunter's record label, Chrysalis Records, to commission the release of the double album Welcome to the Club (1980). Primarily a live album, it also featured some original studio material. Todd Rundgren played lead guitar on Hunter's eleven-show 1980 US tour but does not appear on the live album.

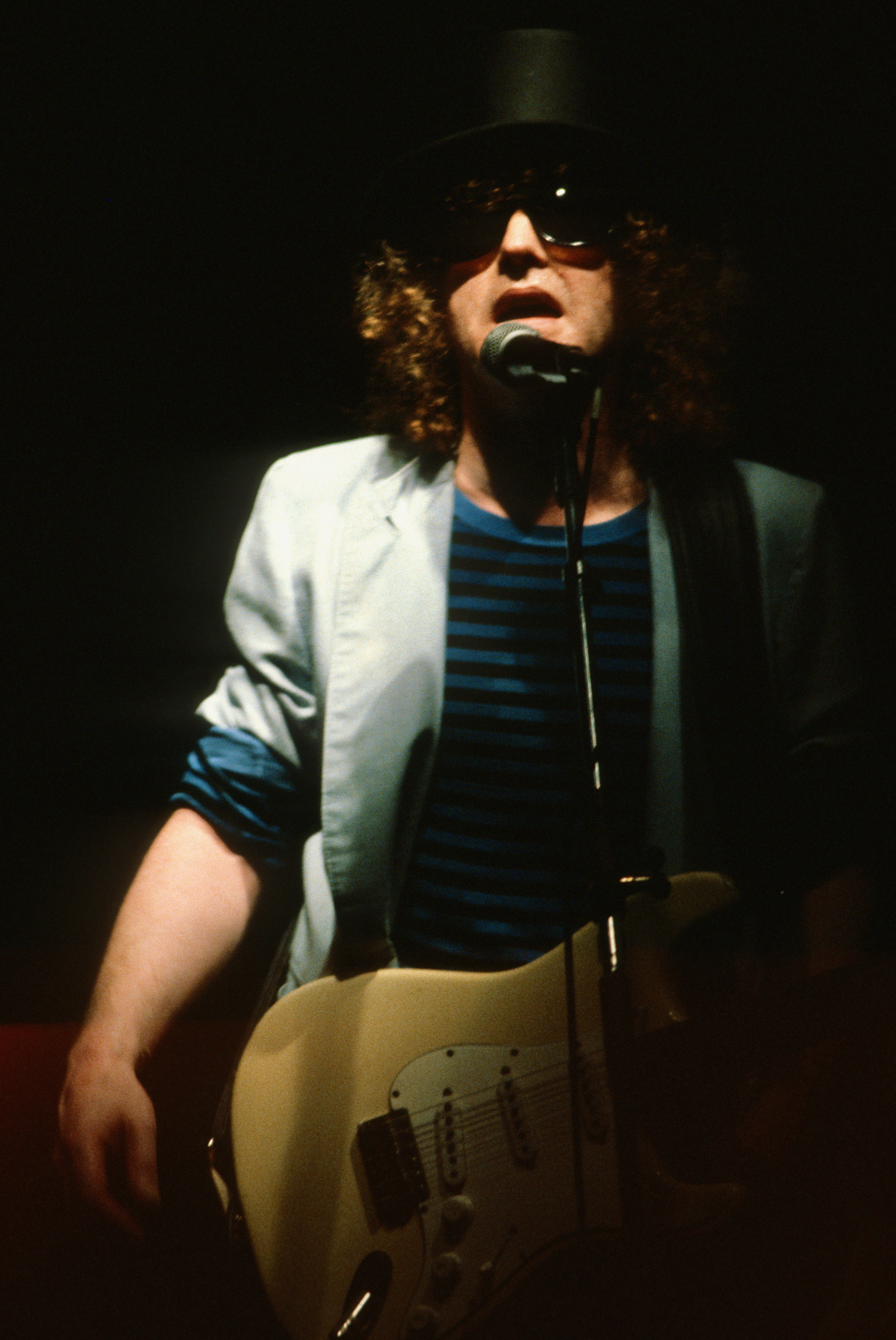
Ian Hunter performing at Club Foot, Austin, Texas, 1981

Hunter's first studio album of the 1980s was Short Back 'n' Sides (1981), produced in collaboration with Ronson and Clash guitarist Mick Jones. Ronson's input on Hunter's next album, All of the Good Ones Are Taken (1983), was restricted to playing guitar on a single track. The title track became a minor hit in the US, after MTV put the song's video into heavy rotation. In the same year, Ronson travelled to Canada to produce the Payolas' album Hammer on a Drum, to which Hunter contributed backing vocals.

=== 1990s ===
YUI Orta was released as a joint album by Hunter and Ronson in 1990, and the pair performed alongside David Bowie and Queen at The Freddie Mercury Tribute Concert in April 1992. Ronson died of liver cancer a year later, and Hunter gave his memorial speech. Hunter wrote and recorded "Michael Picasso", a tribute to Ronson that was included on Hunter's 1996 album The Artful Dodger, the follow-up to Dirty Laundry (1995). Hunter appeared on Ronson's posthumously-released solo album, Heaven and Hull (1994), and performed at the first Mick Ronson Memorial Concert in April 1994.

=== 2000s ===
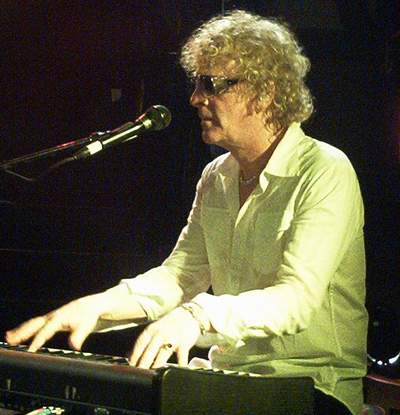
Hunter in 2004

In 2000, Hunter played a handful of live dates in the UK and the US to promote the release of Sony's 2-CD anthology, Once Bitten Twice Shy. For the UK dates, he used the same band as in 1999: Darrell Bath (guitar), Paul Cuddeford (guitar), Paul 'Trevor' Francis (bass), Ian Gibbons (keyboards), and Steve Holley (drums). For the lone US date, his band included Andy York (guitar), John Conte (bass), Tom Mandel (keyboards), and Steve Holley (drums).

In 2001, Hunter toured North America with Ringo Starr and his All-Starr Band as part of a line-up which included Ringo Starr, Sheila E., Greg Lake, Howard Jones, Roger Hodgson, and Mark Rivera. Hunter's studio album Rant, produced with guitarist Andy York, released the same year and was followed by two live albums: 2004's Strings Attached with a 20-piece orchestra, and 2005's The Truth, the Whole Truth and Nuthin' But the Truth with Mick Ralphs (and Brian May of Queen and Joe Elliott of Def Leppard on one song). Hunter won Classic Rock Magazine's Songwriter Award in October 2005. His studio album, Shrunken Heads, was accompanied by a three-song bonus CD, and was released in May 2007 by Jerkin' Crocus in Europe and Yep Roc Records in the US. Man Overboard, was released on 21 July 2009, by New West Records.

=== 2010s ===
Hunter's 20th solo studio album When I'm President was released on 3 September 2012, in the UK on Proper Records, and on the following day in the US on Slimstyle Records.

Hunter and his Rant band performed on 3 June 2015, at the City Winery in New York. A new live album, Ian Hunter & the Rant Band – Live in the UK 2010, was released on 20 October 2014, on Hunter's own label Rant Records. Hunter continues to tour across the UK, Europe and North America. In January 2015, he played three nights in Tokyo. Hunter's observations on his Tokyo trip were documented in an article titled 'Diary of a Rock 'N' Roll Star – Part 2' that appeared in the June 2015 issue of Mojo.

A new studio album, Fingers Crossed, was released worldwide on 16 September 2016, on Proper Records. The album featured the song "Dandy", which Hunter wrote about and dedicated to the late David Bowie. Hunter said: "It was drab in England in the early 70s and I think David was the probably the first technicolour artist, going to see him was like going to the movies. Then you came out and caught the last bus home."

Also in 2016, a career-retrospective 30 disc box set collection entitled 'Stranded In Reality' collected all of his album releases up to 2015, plus several discs of rarities and unreleased material, a DVD disc and a book, plus a signed lithograph and replica music paper.

On 29 March 2019, Hunter joined Def Leppard and other artists on stage during the band's Rock and Roll Hall of Fame performance. The group played "All the Young Dudes" to close the night.

Hunter & the Rant Band's four-night Gala 80th Birthday Celebration was held at the City Winery in New York City from 31 May to 3 June 2019. On 30 September 2019, Hunter's 2019 US tour was cancelled because he developed a severe case of tinnitus and his doctors advised him to stop performing until it subsided.

=== 2020s ===
Hunter has not toured since 2019, but has continued to record, and lately collaborate remotely with various artists. He released the studio album Defiance Part 1 in 2023. A follow-up, Defiance Part 2: Fiction, was released in April 2024.

== Discography ==
=== Solo albums ===
Year	Title	Peak chart positions								
Year	Title	UK	AUS	CA	FIN	GE	NO	NZ	SW	US
1975	Ian Hunter	21	36	83	—	—	—	—	—	50
1976	All American Alien Boy	29	63	—	28	—	—	—	41	177
1977	Overnight Angels	—	38	—	—	—	—	—	28	—
1979	You're Never Alone with a Schizophrenic	49	68	45	—	—	—	42	26	35
1980	Welcome to the Club (live)	61	—	30	—	48	11	—	28	69
1981	Short Back 'n' Sides	79	—	20	—	—	14	—	18	62
1983	All of the Good Ones Are Taken	—	—	98	—	—	11	—	27	125
1989	YUI Orta (with Mick Ronson)	72	—	—	—	—	—	—	—	—
1995	BBC Live in Concert	—	—	—	—	—	—	—	—	—
1995	Dirty Laundry	—	—	—	—	—	—	—	—	—
1996	The Artful Dodger	—	—	—	—	—	—	—	—	—
2000	Once Bitten Twice Shy (compilation)	—	—	—	—	—	—	—	—	—
2000	Missing in Action (live compilation)	—	—	—	—	—	—	—	—	—
2001	Rant	—	—	—	—	—	—	—	—	—
2004	Strings Attached (DVD and CD)	—	—	—	—	—	—	—	—	—
2004	Just Another Night (DVD, 2004, US release, 2005))	—	—	—	—	—	—	—	—	—
2005	The Truth, the Whole Truth, Nuthin' but the Truth (DVD and CD)	—	—	—	—	—	—	—	—	—
2007	Shrunken Heads	—	—	—	—	—	20	—	34	—
2009	Man Overboard	—	—	—	—	—	—	—	—	—
2012	When I'm President (with the Rant Band)	97	—	—	—	—	20	—	—	151
2014	Live in the UK 2010 (with the Rant Band)	—	—	—	—	—	—	—	—	—
2016	Fingers Crossed (with the Rant Band)	36	—	—	—	—	—	—	59	—
2016	Stranded In Reality (30 disc box set)	—	—	—	—	—	—	—	—	—
2023	Defiance Part 1	88	—	—	—	—	—	—	—	—
2024	Defiance Part 2: Fiction	—	—	—	—	—	—	—	—	—

=== Solo singles ===
Year	Single	Chart positions			
Year	Single	UK	AUS	US	US Main
1975	"Once Bitten, Twice Shy"	14	29	—	—
1976	"Who Do You Love"	—	83	—	—
1976	"All American Alien Boy"	—	—	—	—
1976	"You Nearly Did Me In"	—	—	—	—
1977	"England Rocks"	—	—	—	—
1979	"Just Another Night"	—	—	68	—
1979	"When the Daylight Comes"	—	—	108	—
1979	"Ships"	—	—	—	—
1980	"We Gotta Get Out of Here"	—	—	108	—
1981	"Central Park 'n' West"	—	—	—	—
1981	"I Need Your Love"	—	—	—	47
1983	"All of the Good Ones Are Taken"	—	—	—	25
1983	"That Girl Is Rock 'n' Roll"	—	—	—	—
1983	"Somethin's Goin' On"	—	—	—	—
1989	"American Music"	—	—	—	24
1989	"Women's Intuition"	—	—	—	—
2001	"Still Love Rock 'n' Roll"	—	—	—	—
2007	"When the World Was Round"	91	—	—	—
2012	"When I'm President"	—	—	—	—
2016	"Dandy"	—	—	—	—

=== Mott the Hoople albums ===
- Mott the Hoople (1969) – UK No. 66 / US No. 185
- Mad Shadows (1970) – UK No. 48
- Wildlife (1971) – UK No. 44
- Brain Capers (1971) – did not chart
- All the Young Dudes (1972) – UK No. 21 / US No. 89
- Mott (1973) – UK No. 7 / US No. 35
- The Hoople (1974) – UK No. 11 / US No. 28
- Rock and Roll Queen (1974) – US No. 112
- Live (1974) – UK No. 32 / US No. 23
- Greatest Hits (1976)
- Shades of Ian Hunter: The Ballad of Ian Hunter and Mott the Hoople (1979) 2-CD set – Mott on one disk, Hunter solo on the other
- Old Records Never Die: The Mott the Hoople/Ian Hunter Anthology (August 2008) 2-CD set – Mott on one disk, Hunter solo on the other

=== Mott the Hoople Billboard singles ===
- "The Golden Age of Rock 'n' Roll" – UK No. 16 / US No. 96
- "One of the Boys" – US No. 96
- "All the Young Dudes" – UK No. 3 / US No. 37
